= 1926–27 Queens Park Rangers F.C. season =

English football club season

Queens Park Rangers
1926–27 season
- Manager: Bob Hewison
- Stadium: Loftus Road
- Football League Third Division South: 14th
- FA Cup: Did not enter
- London Challenge Cup: 2nd Round
- Top goalscorer: League: George Goddard 23; All: George Goddard 23
- Highest home attendance: 14,730 (12 March 1927) Vs Millwall
- Lowest home attendance: 2,954 (13 November 1926) vs Norwich City
- Average home league attendance: 9,076
- Biggest win: 5–1 Vs Merthyr Town (23 April 1927)
- Biggest defeat: 2–6 Vs Bournemouth & Boscombe Athletic (2 October 1926) & Swindon Town (18 December 1926)
Home colours	Away colours	Third colours

The 1926–27 Queens Park Rangers season was the club's 36th season of existence and their 7th season in the Football League Third Division. QPR finished 14th in the league. During this campaign, QPR first wore the blue and white kit that has become a mainstay at the club.

== League standings ==
Pos	Team	Pld	W	D	L	GF	GA	GAv	Pts
12	Exeter City	42	15	10	17	76	73	1.041	40
13	Charlton Athletic	42	16	8	18	60	61	0.984	40
14	Queens Park Rangers	42	15	9	18	65	71	0.915	39
15	Coventry City	42	15	7	20	71	86	0.826	37
16	Norwich City	42	12	11	19	59	71	0.831	35

=== Results ===
QPR scores given first

Win Draw Loss

=== Third Division South ===
Date	Venue	Opponent	Result	Score F–A	Scorers	Attendance	League Position
28 August 1926	A	Crystal Palace	L	1–2	Varco	18,261	16
1 September 1926	A	Gillingham	D	2–2	Lofthouse, Wilcox	6,208	15
4 September 1926	H	Coventry City	D	1–1	Lofthouse	13,699	14
11 September 1926	A	Brentford	L	2–4	Paterson, Goddard	17,380	18
18 September 1926	A	Charlton Athletic	L	0–2		9,189	21
20 September 1926	A	Aberdare Athletic	W	2–0	Goddard 2	1,864	18
25 September 1926	H	Bristol City	L	1–2	Middleton (pen)	11,921	20
30 September 1926	H	Aberdare Athletic	W	3–0	Brophy (og), Lofthouse, Goddard	5,890	14
2 October 1926	A	Bournemouth & Boscombe Athletic	L	2–6	Young, J. (pen), Goddard	6,342	17
9 October 1926	H	Plymouth Argyle	W	4–2	Goddard, Lofthouse 2, Middleton	12,699	16
16 October 1926	H	Bristol Rovers	D	2–2	Burgess, Goddard	11,225	16
23 October 1926	A	Millwall	L	1–2	Middleton	14,803	17
30 October 1926	H	Northampton Town	W	4–2	Lofthouse 2, McAllister, Goddard	10,058	14
6 November 1926	A	Brighton & Hove Albion	L	1–4	Goddard	10,875	16
13 November 1926	H	Norwich City	W	4–0	Goddard 2, Lofthouse, Varco	2,954	14
20 November 1926	A	Luton Town	L	0–2		5,075	14
4 December 1926	A	Merthyr Town	L	0–4		2,330	15
11 December 1926	H	Exeter City		PP			
11 December 1926	A	Plymouth Argyle	L	0–2		10,947	17
18 December 1926	A	Swindon Town	L	2–6	Goddard 2	6,706	17
25 December 1926	H	Watford	L	2–4	Young, J. (pen), Mustard	11,833	19
27 December 1926	A	Watford	W	2–1	Charlesworth, Lofthouse	13,004	17
1 January 1927	H	Gillingham	D	1–1	Goddard	7,714	18
8 January 1927	H	Southend United	W	3–2	Middleton, Goddard, Charlesworth	6,726	16
15 January 1927	H	Crystal Palace	L	0–2		11,506	18
22 January 1927	A	Coventry City	L	0–1		8,187	18
29 January 1927	H	Brentford		pp			
5 February 1927	H	Charlton Athletic	W	2–1	Goddard 2	8,744	18
12 February 1927	A	Bristol City	L	0–1		12,029	18
19 February 1927	H	Bournemouth & Boscombe Athletic	D	1–1	Lofthouse	6,678	18
24 February 1927	H	Exeter City	D	1–1	Lofthouse	2,283	18
5 March 1927	A	Bristol Rovers	L	1–4	Wilcox	4,222	19
12 March 1927	H	Millwall	D	1–1	Goddard	14,730	19
19 March 1927	A	Northampton Town	L	0–1		5,369	21
26 March 1927	H	Brighton & Hove Albion	D	2–2	Mustard, Lofthouse	8,401	21
2 April 1927	A	Norwich City	W	1–0	Lofthouse	10,973	20
9 April 1927	H	Luton Town	W	1–0	Goddard	4,484	19
15 April 1927	A	Newport County	W	2–0	Goddard, Varco	5,938	15
16 April 1927	A	Southend United	W	3–0	Charlesworth, Swan, Goddard	7,813	15
18 April 1927	H	Newport County	W	2–0	Goddard, Young, J. (pen)	9,057	15
23 April 1927	H	Merthyr Town	W	5–1	Young, J. 2 (2 pens), Varco, Paterson, Goddard	8,406	14
30 April 1927	A	Exeter City	W	2–0	Lofthouse, Paterson	5,952	14
5 May 1927	H	Brentford	D	1–1	Hawley	11,355	13
7 May 1927	H	Swindon Town	L	0–1		10,158	14

=== F A Cup ===
Round	Date	Venue	Opponent	Result	Score F–A	Scorers	Attendance
Did not Enter – Administrative error							

=== London Professional Charity Fund ===
Date	Venue	Opponent	Result	Score F–A	Scorers	Attendance
LPCF	1 November 1925	Brentford	W	5–3	Goddard 4, Burgess	1,000

=== London Challenge Cup ===
Round	Date	Venue	Opponent	Result	Score F–A	Scorers	Attendance
LCC 1	27 September 1925	A	Barnet	W	2–1	Lofthouse (pen), Wilcox	2,000
LCC 2	18 October 1925	H	Crystal P	L	0–1		1,000

=== Friendlies ===
21 August 1926	Possibles v Probables (H)	H
26 November 1926	Plymouth Argyle	h

== Squad ==
Position	Nationality	Name	Third Division South		Total	
Position	Nationality	Name	Apps	Goals	Apps	Goals
GK	ENG	Joey Cunningham	19		19	
GK	ENG	George Hebden	23		23	
GK	ENG	Joe Woodward				
DF	ENG	Jimmy Armstrong				
DF	ENG	Tom Nixon				
DF	ENG	Bill Pierce	19		19	
DF	ENG	Sid Sweetman	18		18	
DF	ENG	John Young	32	5	32	5
DF	ENG	Norman Crompton				
DF	ENG	Harry Hooper	16		16	
DF	ENG	Alf Bowers	1		1	
DF	ENG	Cecil Gough	19		19	
DF	ENG	Jack Middleton	28	4	28	4
MF	ENG	Billy Coward				
MF	SCO	Andy Neil				
MF	SCO	Jock McNab				
MF	ENG	Cyril Foster				
MF	ENG	Jimmy Eggleton	12		12	
MF	ENG	Ollie Thompson				
MF	SCO	Jock Collier	20		20	
MF	ENG	Bill Turner				
MF	ENG	Fred Hawley	22	1	22	1
MF	SCO	Mike Gilhooley				
MF	SCO	John Duthie				
MF	ENG	Eddie Beats				
MF	SCO	Billy McAllister		1		1
MF	ENG	Tommy Cable	5		5	
MF	ENG	Harry Salt	6		6	
MF	ENG	Albert Waterall	2		2	
MF	ENG	John Hamilton	10		10	
MF	ENG	Bill Drew	1		1	
MF	ENG	George Charlesworth	26	3	26	3
FW	ENG	Thomas Kellard				
FW	ENG	George Goddard	38	23	38	23
FW	ENG	George Rounce				
FW	ENG	Ernie Whatmore				
FW	ENG	Jackie Burns				
FW	ENG	Steve Smith				
FW		Jack Johnson				
FW	ENG	Hugh Vallance				
FW	ENG	Lew Price				
FW	ENG	Jack Swan	14	1	14	1
FW	ENG	Jimmy Lofthouse	42	14	42	14
FW	ENG	Jack Mustard	14	2	14	2
FW	SCO	Jock Paterson	14	3	14	3
FW	ENG	Joe Roberts				
FW	ENG	Jimmy Stephenson				
FW	ENG	Percy Varco	16	4	16	4
FW	ENG	Dick Burgess	14	1	14	1
FW	ENG	Joe Wilcox	9	2	9	2

== Transfers in ==
Name	from	Date	Fee
Miller, Rev	Chesham U	14 July 1926	
Thompson, Edward *		26 July 1926	
Northcote, Stanley *		22 July 1926	
Nichols, Stan *	Bostall Heath	26 July 1926	
Robinson, Jimmy *	Nunhead	30 July 1926	
Beckworth, Arthur *	Guildford U	4 August 1926	
Margetts, William *	Leytonstone	5 August 1926	
Bowers, Alf	Bristol R	9 August 1926	
Bill Drew	Barnet	11 August 1926	
Hooper, Harry	Leicester	17 August 1926	
Waterall, Albert	Stockport	13 September 1926	
Bush, Arthur *		7 October 1926	
Eggleton, Jimmy	Lincoln City	22 October 1926	£500
Young, Harry *	Southall	Oct 1926	
McAllister, Billy	Middlesbrough	21 October 1926	£250
Rounce, George *	Uxbridge Town	8 October 1926	
Wodehouse, George *	Leytonstone	8 October 1926	
Young, Harry *	Southall	Oct 1926	
Jack Mustard	Crawcrook Albion	13 October 1926	
Adams, Samuel *	Clapton	7 January 1927	
Jack Swan	Watford	9 February 1927	£300
Burr, John *		16 March 1927	
Rogers, Bert *	Southall	25 March 1927	
Tom Nixon	Crawcrook Albion	6 April 1927	
Mike Gilhooley	Bradford C	26 May 1927	
Andy Neil	Brighton	10 May 1927	Free
Jack Burns	Crypto	14 May 1927	
Joe Roberts	Watford	18 May 1927	Free
Jack Johnson	Swindon	26 May 1927	

Transfers out

Name	from	Date	Fee	Date	To	Fee
Field, Bill	Oxford City	22 November 1922		cs 26	Hinckley U	
Barr, Billy *	London Caledonians	10 September 1925		cs 26	London Caledonians	
Avey, Victor *		19 November 1924		cs 26	Metropolitan Police	
Richmond, Hugh	Coventry	8 May 1925		26 July	Blyth Spartans	Free
John, Reg	Crystal P	28 August 1920		26 July	Charlton	
Pigg, Bill	Ashington	31 July 1924		26 July	Carlisle	
Johnson, Harry	Southampton	14 February 1924		26 July	Cradley Heath	
Brown, Charlie	Southampton	25 May 1924		26 July	Poole	
Plunkett, Adam	Bury	1 July 1925		26 Aug	Guildford U	
Ford, Ewart	Hinckley U	6 June 1924		26 Aug	Hinckley U	£50
Symes, Ernie	Aberdare Athletic	20 May 1924		26 Sep	Margate	
Waterall, Albert	Stockport	13 September 1926		26 Oct	Clapton Orient	
Northcote, Stanley *		22 July 1926		26 Nov		
Wodehouse, George *	Leytonstone	8 October 1926		26 Nov	Leytonstone	
Cable, Tommy *	Leyton	13 November 1925		27 Jan	Leyton	
Adams, Samuel *	Clapton	7 January 1927		27 Apr	Kettering Town	
John Hamilton	Blackpool	11 June 1926		27 Apr	Sutton Town	
Toseland, Ernie *	Higham Town	28 May 1925		27 May	Coventry	
George Hebden	Leicester	5 May 1925		27 May	Gillingham	
Harry Hooper,	Leicester	17 August 1926		27 May		
Beckworth, Arthur *	Guildford U	4 August 1926		27 Mar	Guildford U	
Cecil Gough	Clapton Orient	14 June 1926		27 June	Torquay	
Miller, Rev	Chesham U	14 July 1926		cs 27		
Miller, Ted *	Clapton	10 September 1925		cs 27		
Birnie, David *	Acton	28 August 1925		cs 27	Summerstown	
Alf Bowers	Bristol R	9 August 1926		cs 27		
Burr, John *		16 March 1927		cs 27	Leyton	
Bush, Arthur *		7 October 1926		cs 27		
Chick, Albert *		19 February 1926		cs 27		
Robinson, Jimmy *	Nunhead	30 July 1926		cs 27		
Rogers, Bert *	Southall	25 March 1927		cs 27	Southall	
Rounce, George *	Uxbridge Town	8 October 1926		cs 27	Tilbury	
Harry Salt	Peterborough & Fletton U	10 May 1926		cs 27	Grays Thurrock U	
Surridge, Edward *	Chalfont St.Giles	2 December 1925		cs 27	Uxbridge Town	
Thompson, Edward *		26 July 1926		cs 27		
