= 1927–28 Queens Park Rangers F.C. season =

English football club season

Queens Park Rangers
1927–28 season
- Manager: Bob Hewison
- Stadium: Loftus Road
- Football League Third Division South: 10th
- FA Cup: 1st round
- London Challenge Cup: 2nd Round
- Top goalscorer: League: George Goddard 25; All: George Goddard 25
- Highest home attendance: 18,829 (10/9/1927) vs Brentford
- Lowest home attendance: 4,691 (3/5/1928) vs Norwich City
- Average home league attendance: 10,407
- Biggest win: 6–1 (6/4/1928) Vs Newport County
- Biggest defeat: 0–7 (7/4/1928) Vs Southend United
| Home colours | Away colours |

The 1927–28 Queens Park Rangers season was the club's 37th season of existence and their 8th season in the Football League Third Division. QPR finished 10th in the league, and were eliminated in the first round of the 1927–28 FA Cup.

== League standings ==
| Pos | Team | Pld | W | D | L | GF | GA | GAv | Pts |
|---|---|---|---|---|---|---|---|---|---|
| 8 | Exeter City | 42 | 17 | 12 | 13 | 70 | 60 | 1.167 | 46 |
| 9 | Newport County | 42 | 18 | 9 | 15 | 81 | 84 | 0.964 | 45 |
| 10 | Queens Park Rangers | 42 | 17 | 9 | 16 | 72 | 71 | 1.014 | 43 |
| 11 | Charlton Athletic | 42 | 15 | 13 | 14 | 60 | 70 | 0.857 | 43 |
| 12 | Brentford | 42 | 16 | 8 | 18 | 76 | 74 | 1.027 | 40 |

=== Results ===
QPR scores given first

Win Draw Loss

=== Third Division South ===
| Date | Venue | Opponent | Result | Score F–A | Scorers | Attendance | League Position |
|---|---|---|---|---|---|---|---|
| 27 August 1927 | H | Newport County | W | 4–2 | Goddard 2 (1 pen), Lofthouse, Swan | 15,489 | 7 |
| 1 September 1927 | H | Gillingham | D | 3–3 | Goddard 2, Lofthouse | 9,241 | 4 |
| 3 September 1927 | A | Swindon Town | W | 2–0 | Swan, Johnson | 9,659 | 2 |
| 7 September 1927 | A | Gillingham | W | 2–1 | Johnson, Neil | 5,499 | 2 |
| 10 September 1927 | H | Brentford | L | 2–3 | Lofthouse 2 | 18,829 | 3 |
| 17 September 1927 | H | Watford | W | 2–1 | Swan, Goddard | 13,950 | 2 |
| 21 September 1927 | A | Bournemouth & Boscombe Athletic | W | 2–1 | Lofthouse, Goddard | 4,440 | 1 |
| 24 September 1927 | A | Charlton Athletic | L | 0–1 | | 12,823 | 1 |
| 1 October 1927 | H | Bristol Rovers | W | 4–2 | Goddard 3, Collier | 8,448 | 1 |
| 8 October 1927 | A | Plymouth Argyle | L | 0–3 | | 12,343 | 3 |
| 15 October 1927 | H | Merthyr Town | D | 0–0 | | 11,406 | 4 |
| 22 October 1927 | A | Crystal Palace | D | 1–1 | Lofthouse | 7,115 | 6 |
| 29 October 1927 | H | Millwall | L | 0–1 | | 16,960 | 9 |
| 5 November 1927 | A | Luton Town | W | 1–0 | Goddard | 7,695 | 6 |
| 12 November 1927 | H | Exeter City | L | 0–1 | | 8,291 | 7 |
| 19 November 1927 | A | Torquay United | L | 0–1 | | 2,235 | 9 |
| 3 December 1927 | A | Northampton Town | L | 0–1 | | 9,737 | 11 |
| 10 December 1927 | H | Norwich City | | pp | | | |
| 17 December 1927 | A | Brighton & Hove Albion | W | 3–1 | Goddard 2, Lofthouse | 5,835 | 8 |
| 24 December 1927 | H | Bournemouth & Boscombe Athletic | W | 2–0 | Goddard, Mustard | 6,260 | 7 |
| 26 December 1927 | H | Coventry City | | PP | | | |
| 27 December 1927 | A | Coventry City | D | 0–0 | | 8,975 | 7 |
| 31 December 1927 | A | Newport County | | pp | | | |
| 7 January 1928 | H | Swindon Town | L | 0–1 | | 9,981 | 10 |
| 14 January 1928 | H | Southend United | W | 3–2 | Burns, Mustard, Young, J. (pen) | 7,294 | 8 |
| 21 January 1928 | A | Brentford | W | 3–0 | Goddard 2, Burns | 10,430 | 7 |
| 28 January 1928 | A | Watford | D | 3–3 | Lofthouse 2, Goddard | 5,597 | 6 |
| 4 February 1928 | H | Charlton Athletic | D | 3–3 | Goddard 2, Burns | 10,830 | 7 |
| 11 February 1928 | A | Bristol Rovers | W | 4–0 | Johnson, Lofthouse 2, Goddard | 6,862 | 6 |
| 18 February 1928 | H | Plymouth Argyle | L | 0–1 | | 17,377 | 7 |
| 25 February 1928 | A | Merthyr Town | W | 4–0 | Goddard 3, Rounce | 2,869 | 6 |
| 3 March 1928 | H | Crystal Palace | W | 2–0 | Swan, Goddard | 16,468 | 5 |
| 10 March 1928 | A | Millwall | L | 1–6 | Beats | 18,689 | 6 |
| 17 March 1928 | H | Luton Town | W | 3–2 | Johnson, Burns, Lofthouse | 11,217 | 6 |
| 24 March 1928 | A | Exeter City | L | 0–4 | | 5,657 | 9 |
| 31 March 1928 | H | Torquay United | L | 2–3 | Coward, Rounce | 5,839 | 10 |
| 6 April 1928 | A | Newport County | W | 6–1 | Goddard 2, Coward, Rounce, Young, J. (pen), Burns | 5,918 | 8 |
| 7 April 1928 | A | Southend United | L | 0–7 | | 8,126 | 9 |
| 9 April 1928 | H | Walsall | D | 1–1 | Young, J. (pen) | 8,082 | 10 |
| 10 April 1928 | A | Walsall | D | 2–2 | Lofthouse, Rounce | 6,419 | 10 |
| 14 April 1928 | H | Northampton Town | L | 0–4 | | 8,399 | 10 |
| 21 April 1928 | A | Norwich City | L | 1–3 | Johnson | 4,867 | 10 |
| 26 April 1928 | H | Coventry City | L | 1–5 | Rounce | 4,095 | 10 |
| 28 April 1928 | H | Brighton & Hove Albion | W | 5–0 | Johnson 2, Rounce, Lofthouse, Young, J. (pen) | 5,394 | 10 |
| 3 May 1928 | H | Norwich City | D | 0–0 | 4,691 | 4,691 | 10 |

=== F A Cup ===
| Round | Date | Venue | Opponent | Result | Score F–A | Scorers | Attendance |
|---|---|---|---|---|---|---|---|
| FA Cup 1 | 26 November 1927 | A | Aldershot (Southern League) | Abandoned fog (47 minutes) | 1 – 0* | Mustard | 10,000 |
| FA Cup 1 | 30 November 1927 | A | Aldershot (Southern League) | L | 1–2 | Johnson | 4,000 |

=== London Professional Charity Fund ===
| Date | Venue | Opponent | Result | Score F–A | Scorers | Attendance |
|---|---|---|---|---|---|---|
| 7 November 1927 | A | Brentford | L | 0–2 | | |

=== Peterborough Infirmary Charity Cup ===
| Date | Venue | Opponent | Result | Score F–A | Scorers | Attendance |
|---|---|---|---|---|---|---|
| 7 May 1928 | A | Peterborough & Fletton U | W | 3–1 | Rounce 2, Lofthouse | |

=== London Challenge Cup ===
| Round | Date | Venue | Opponent | Result | Score F–A | Scorers | Attendance |
|---|---|---|---|---|---|---|---|
| LCC 1 | 17 October 1927 | H | West Ham | W | 4–1 | Goddard 2, Mustard, Turner | |
| LCC 2 | 31 October 1927 | H | Charlton | D | 2–2 | Johnson, Goddard | |
| LCC 2 Rep | 14 November 1927 | A | Charlton | L | 2–4 | Neil, Johnson | |

=== Friendlies ===
| 20 August 1927 | Blues v Hoops | H | |
| 12 September 1927 | Huddersfield Town | H | James Birch Testimonial |
| 10 December 1927 | Corinthians | H | |

== Squad ==
| Position | Nationality | Name | Third Division South | | FA Cup | | Total | |
| Position | Nationality | Name | Apps | Goals | Apps | Goals | Apps | Goals |
|---|---|---|---|---|---|---|---|---|
| GK | ENG | Joey Cunningham | 36 | | 1 | | 37 | |
| GK | ENG | Joe Woodward | 6 | | | | 6 | |
| DF | ENG | Jimmy Armstrong | | | | | | |
| DF | ENG | Tom Nixon | | | | | | |
| DF | ENG | Bill Pierce | 38 | | | | 38 | |
| DF | ENG | Sid Sweetman | 16 | | 1 | | 17 | |
| DF | ENG | John Young | 30 | 4 | 1 | | 31 | 4 |
| DF | ENG | Norman Crompton | 1 | | | | 1 | |
| MF | ENG | Billy Coward | 7 | 2 | | | 7 | 2 |
| MF | ENG | Bert Rogers | | | | | | |
| MF | SCO | Andy Neil | 41 | 1 | 1 | | 42 | 1 |
| MF | SCO | Jock McNab | | | | | | |
| MF | ENG | Cyril Foster | | | | | | |
| MF | ENG | Jimmy Eggleton | 26 | | 1 | | 27 | |
| MF | ENG | Ollie Thompson | | | | | | |
| MF | SCO | Jock Collier | 16 | 1 | 1 | | 17 | 1 |
| MF | ENG | Bill Turner | 38 | | 1 | | 39 | |
| MF | ENG | Fred Hawley | 7 | | | | 7 | |
| MF | SCO | Mike Gilhooley | 9 | | | | 9 | |
| MF | SCO | John Duthie | 11 | | | | 11 | |
| MF | ENG | Eddie Beats | 1 | 1 | | | 1 | 1 |
| FW | ENG | Thomas Kellard | 1 | | | | 1 | |
| FW | ENG | George Goddard | 33 | 25 | 1 | | 34 | 25 |
| FW | ENG | George Rounce | 13 | 6 | | | 13 | 6 |
| FW | ENG | Ernie Whatmore | | | | | | |
| FW | ENG | Jackie Burns | 16 | 5 | | | 16 | 5 |
| FW | ENG | Steve Smith | | | | | | |
| FW | | Jack Johnson | 17 | 7 | 1 | 1 | 18 | 8 |
| FW | ENG | Hugh Vallance | | | | | | |
| FW | ENG | Lew Price | | | | | | |
| FW | ENG | Jack Swan | 14 | 4 | | | 14 | 4 |
| FW | ENG | Jimmy Lofthouse | 38 | 14 | 1 | | 39 | 14 |
| FW | ENG | Jack Mustard | 23 | 2 | 1 | | 24 | 2 |
| FW | SCO | Jock Paterson | 2 | | | | 2 | |
| FW | ENG | Joe Roberts | 4 | | | | 4 | |
| FW | ENG | Jimmy Stephenson | 18 | | | | 18 | |

== Transfers in ==
| Name | from | Date | Fee |
|---|---|---|---|
| Bill Turner | Bury | 2 July 1927 | |
| Jimmy Stephenson | Watford | 12 July 1927 | Free |
| Eddie Beats | Aston Villa | 29 July 1927 | |
| Knott, Percy | Stoke | 12 September 1927 | Free |
| John Duthie | Fraserburgh | 12 September 1927 | Free |
| Mizen, John * | Swanley | 28 September 1927 | |
| Brown, Thomas | | 4 November 1927 | |
| Carr, Jimmy | Southall | 5 November 1927 | |
| Billy Coward | Windsor & Eton | 28 January 1928 | |
| Joe Woodward | Clapton Orient | 24 February 1928 | |
| Ellis, Harold * | Swanley | 4 February 1928 | |
| Wilkins, Albert * | Redhill | 6 February 1928 | |
| George Rounce | Tilbury | 7 February 1928 | |
| Arrowsmith, John | Bilston U | 27 March 1928 | |
| Harrison, Gerard * | Atherstone Town | 28 March 1928 | |
| Norman Crompton | Oldham | 2 May 1928 | |
| Kellard, Tom | Oldham | 2 May 1928 | Free |
| Jimmy Armstrong | Clapton Orient | 10 May 1928 | |
| Steve Smith | Clapton Orient | 10 May 1928 | |
| Ollie Thompson | Chesterfield | 10 May 1928 | |
| Hugh Vallance | Aston Villa | 14 May 1928 | |
| Price, Lew | Notts County | 21 May 1928 | Free |
| Ernie Whatmore | Bristol Rovers | 9 June 1928 | |
| Jock McNab | Liverpool | 14 June 1928 | |
| Cyril Foster | Watford | 30 June 1928 | |
| McNab, Jock | Liverpool | 14 June 1928 | |
| Foster, Cyril | Watford | 30 June 1928 | |
| Rounce, Albert * | Tilbury | 29 June 1928 | |

== Transfers out ==
| Name | from | Date | Fee | Date | To | Fee |
|---|---|---|---|---|---|---|
| Miller, Rev | Chesham U | 14 July 1926 | | cs 27 | | |
| Miller, Ted * | Clapton | 10 September 1925 | | cs 27 | | |
| Birnie, David * | Acton | 28 August 1925 | | cs 27 | Summerstown | |
| Bowers, Alf | Bristol R | 9 August 1926 | | cs 27 | | |
| Burr, John * | | 16 March 1927 | | cs 27 | Leyton | |
| Bush, Arthur * | | 7 October 1926 | | cs 27 | | |
| Chick, Albert * | | 19 February 1926 | | cs 27 | | |
| Robinson, Jimmy * | Nunhead | 30 July 1926 | | cs 27 | | |
| Rogers, Bert * | Southall | 25 March 1927 | | cs 27 | Southall | |
| Rounce, George * | Uxbridge Town | 8 October 1926 | | cs 27 | Tilbury | |
| Salt, Harry | Peterborough & Fletton U | 10 May 1926 | | cs 27 | Grays Thurrock U | |
| Surridge, Edward * | Chalfont St.Giles | 2 December 1925 | | cs 27 | Uxbridge Town | |
| Thompson, Edward * | | 26 July 1926 | | cs 27 | | |
| Middleton, Jack | Leicester | 5 May 1925 | | 27 July | Aldershot | |
| Charlesworth, George * | Bristol R | 26 May 1926 | | 27 July | Kettering Town | |
| Nichols, Stan * | Bostall Heath | 26 July 1926 | | 27 July | Retired (to play cricket) | |
| Young, Bill | Whitburn | 11 February 1925 | | 27 July | Kettering Town | |
| Varco, Percy | Aston Villa | 12 June 1926 | £800 | 27 July | Norwich | |
| Wilcox, Joe | Bristol R | 10 May 1926 | Free | 27 Aug | Gillingham | |
| Burgess, Dan (Dick) | Aberdare Athletic | 17 June 1925 | | 27 Aug | Sittingbourne | Free |
| Birch, Jimmy | Aston Villa | 2 May 1912 | £150 | 27 Oct | Folkestone | Free |
| Margetts, William * | Leytonstone | 5 August 1926 | | 27 Oct | Leyton | |
| McAllister, Billy | Middlesbrough | 21 October 1926 | £250 | 27 Nov | Raith Rovers | |
| Hawley, Fred | Brighton | 10 May 1926 | | 28 Jan | Loughborough | |
| Knott, Percy | Stoke | 12 September 1927 | Free | 28 Feb | Potteries El.Traction | Free |
| Turner, Bill | Bury | 2 July 1927 | | 28 May | Park Royal | |
| Carr, Jimmy | Southall | 5 November 1927 | | 28 May | Retired | |
