= 1931–32 Queens Park Rangers F.C. season =

English football club season

Queens Park Rangers
1931–32 season
- Chairman: Charles W Fielding
- Manager: John Bowman, Archie Mitchell (from 11 November 1931)
- Stadium: White City Stadium
- Football League Third Division South: 13th
- FA Cup: 4th Round
- Top goalscorer: League: George Goddard 17; All: George Goddard 19
- Highest home attendance: 41,097 (9-Jan-32) Vs Leeds United
- Lowest home attendance: 3,881 (Thu 10 March 1932) Vs Gillingham
- Average home league attendance: 13,303
- Biggest win: 7–0 (Thu 10 March 1932) Vs Gillingham
- Biggest defeat: 1–6 (Sat 2 April 1932) Vs Northampton Town
Home colours	Away colours

The 1931–32 Queens Park Rangers season was the club's 41st season of existence and their 12th season in the Football League Third Division. QPR finished 13th in the league, and were eliminated in the fourth round of the FA Cup. QPR set an attendance record during the campaign, selling 41,097 tickets to a match with Leeds United F.C.. The club moved from Loftus Road to the White City Stadium during the season.

== League standings ==
Pos	Team	Pld	W	D	L	GF	GA	GAv	Pts
11	Watford	42	19	8	15	81	79	1.025	46
12	Coventry City	42	18	8	16	108	97	1.113	44
13	Queens Park Rangers	42	15	12	15	79	73	1.082	42
14	Northampton Town	42	16	7	19	69	69	1.000	39
15	Bournemouth & Boscombe Athletic	42	13	12	17	70	78	0.897	38

=== Results ===
QPR scores given first

Win Draw Loss

=== Third Division South ===
Date	Venue	Opponent	Result	Score F–A	Scorers	Attendance	League Position
Sat 29 August 1931	A	Brentford	L	0–1		20,739	21
Mon 31 August 1931	A	Bristol Rovers	D	1–1	Haley	9,213	15
Sat 5 September 1931	H	Bournemouth and Boscombe Athletic	L	0–3		18,938	22
Thu 10 September 1931	H	Swindon Town	L	1–2	Lewis, J.	7,646	21
Sat 12 September 1931	A	Crystal Palace	D	1–1	Goddard	11,000	22
Wed 16 September 1931	A	Swindon Town	W	2–1	Goddard, Cribb	5,065	20
Sat 19 September 1931	H	Watford	D	4–4	Goddard 4	16,497	17
Sat 26 September 1931	A	Mansfield Town	D	2–2	England (og), Lewis, J.	4,107	18
Sat 3 October 1931	H	Brighton and Hove Albion	D	1–1	Goddard	13,813	18
Sat 10 October 1931	A	Norwich City	L	1–2	Lewis, J.	13,165	20
Sat 17 October 1931	A	Exeter City	L	2–6	Coward, Lewis, J.	6,152	20
Sat 24 October 1931	H	Coventry City	D	1–1	Wilson	12,590	18
Sat 31 October 1931	A	Gillingham	L	0–1		5,457	21
Sat 7 November 1931	H	Luton Town	W	3–1	Cribb 2, Goddard	10,993	18
Sat 14 November 1931	A	Cardiff City	W	4–0	Goddard, Roberts (og), Cribb 2	3,491	13
Sat 21 November 1931	H	Northampton Town	W	3–2	Cribb 2 (1 pen), Coward	12,117	13
Sat 5 December 1931	H	Southend United	W	2–1	Robinson (og), Goddard	17,898	13
Sat 19 December 1931	H	Thames	W	6–0	Goddard 3, Tutt 2, Wilson (pen)	7,397	12
Fri 25 December 1931	A	Torquay United	W	3–2	Cribb, Collins 2	4,999	11
Sat 26 December 1931	H	Torquay United	W	3–1	Wilson, Cribb, Goddard	24,133	10
Mon 28 December 1931	A	Fulham	W	3–1	Goddard 2, Cribb	22,236	9
Sat 2 January 1932	H	Brentford	L	1–2	Cribb (pen)	33,553	9
9 January 1932	A	Reading		pp			
Wed 13 January 1932	A	Reading	L	2–3	Blackman 2	5,038	11
Sat 16 January 1932	A	Bournemouth and Boscombe Athletic	D	2–2	Armstrong, Coward	5,641	11
23 January 1932	H	Crystal Palace		pp			
Thu 28 January 1932	H	Crystal Palace	D	2–2	Blackman, Rounce	8,369	10
Sat 30 January 1932	A	Watford	D	2–2	Howe, Blackman	12,286	10
Sat 6 February 1932	H	Mansfield Town	D	1–1	Blackman	12,079	11
Sat 13 February 1932	A	Brighton and Hove Albion	L	0–1		7,033	11
Sat 20 February 1932	H	Norwich City	D	2–2	Blackman, Cribb (pen)	9,632	12
Sat 27 February 1932	H	Exeter City	W	1–0	Blackman	14,418	11
Sat 5 March 1932	A	Coventry City	L	0–1		12,815	12
Thu 10 March 1932	H	Gillingham	W	7–0	Wiles, H. 4, Coward, Haley 2	3,881	10
Sat 19 March 1932	A	Luton Town	L	1–4	Wiles, H.	5,768	12
Fri 25 March 1932	A	Leyton Orient	L	0–3		9,040	12
Sat 26 March 1932	H	Cardiff City	L	2–3	Rounce, Haley	8,324	13
Mon 28 March 1932	H	Leyton Orient	W	3–2	Wiles, H., Coward, Tutt	11,533	13
Sat 2 April 1932	A	Northampton Town	L	1–6	Wiles, H.	6,444	13
Sat 9 April 1932	H	Reading	W	2–0	Wiles, H. 2	6,755	13
Sat 16 April 1932	A	Southend United	D	0–0		5,689	13
Sat 23 April 1932	H	Fulham	W	3–1	Wiles, H. 2, Haley	21,572	13
Sat 30 April 1932	A	Thames	L	2–3	Rounce 2	1,143	13
Sat 7 May 1932	H	Bristol Rovers	W	2–1	Goddard, Whatmore	7,186	13

=== F A Cup ===
Round	Date	Venue	Opponent	Result	Score F–A	Scorers	Attendance
FA Cup 1	28-Nov-31	A	Barnet (Athenian League)	W	7–3	Goddard 2, Coward 2, Cribb 3	6,853
FA Cup 2	12-Dec-31	A	Scunthorpe United (Midland League)	W	4–1	Rounce 3, Cribb	7,943
FA Cup 3	9-Jan-32	H	Leeds United (Division 2)	W	3–1	Rounce, Cribb 2	41,097
FA Cup 4	23-Jan-32	A	Huddersfield Town (First Division)	L	0–5		31,394

=== London Challenge Cup ===
Round	Date	Venue	Opponent	Result	Score F–A	Scorers	Attendance
LCC 1	12 October 1931	A	Clapton Orient	W	5–0	Collins 4, Howe	
LCC 2	26 October 1931	A	Millwall	L	3–4	Wiles H 2, Stephenson	

Friendlies

15 August 1931	Whites v Hoops (H)		
22 August 1931	Whites v Hoops (H)		
12 November 1931	London University	h	Friendly

== Squad ==
Position	Nationality	Name	Third Division South		FA Cup		Total	
Position	Nationality	Name	Apps	Goals	Apps	Goals	Apps	Goals
GK	ENG	Thomas Pickett	34		4		38	
GK	ENG	Joey Cunningham	8				8	
DF	ENG	Leslie Adlam	28		4		32	
DF	ENG	Jimmy Armstrong	40	1	4		44	1
DF	ENG	Ernie Hall	36		4		42	
DF	ENG	Tom Nixon	22				22	
DF	ENG	Ted Goodier	28		4		32	
DF	ENG	George Wiles	1				1	
DF	ENG	Bernie Harris	15		4		19	
DF	ENG	Bob Pollard	10				10	
DF	ENG	Alf Vango	10				10	
DF	ENG	Norman Smith	2				2	
MF	ENG	Jim Lewis	11	4			11	4
MF	ENG	Billy Coward	26	5	4	2	30	7
MF	ENG	Harry Wiles	11	11			11	11
MF	ENG	Arthur Sales	7				7	
FW	ENG	Bill Haley	17	5			17	5
FW	ENG	Jack Blackman	10	7	2		12	7
FW	ENG	George Goddard	25	17	2	2	27	19
FW	ENG	George Rounce	31	4	4	4	35	8
FW	ENG	James Collins	11	2			11	2
FW	ENG	Harold Howe	3	1			3	1
FW	ENG	Ernie Whatmore	11	1	1		12	1
FW	SCO	Andy Wilson	20	3	3		23	3
FW	ENG	Walter Tutt	6	3			6	3
FW	ENG	Stan Cribb	28	12	4	6	32	18
FW	SCO	Tommy Wyper	11				11	

== Transfers in ==
Name	from	Date	Fee
Ted Goodier	Oldham Athletic	1931	
Walter Tutt	Cantebury-Waverley	1931	
William Morton	Craghead U	13 July 1931	
Jack Blackman	Weston U	28 August 1931	
Andy Wilson	Chelsea	7 October 1931	
William Wheeler		14 November 1931	
Allen, Joe	Tottenham	April 1932	
Don Ashman	Middlesbrough	9 May 1932	£500
Walter Barrrie	West Ham United	13 May 1932	
Robert Wilkinson	Dipton U	26 May 1932	
Jobson, Jack	Stockport	24 June 1932	

== Transfers out ==
Name	from	Date	Fee	Date	To	Fee
Bill Sheppard	Watford	11 June 1930	Free	31 July	Coventry	
Bill Pierce	Bedlington United	8 July 1923		31 Aug	Carlisle	
Sid Embleton	Walthamstow Avenue	3 July 1930		31 Aug	Dagenham Town	
Len Featherby	Reading	16 May 1931		31 Dec	Mansfield	
Andy Wilson	Chelsea	1931		1932	Sporting Club Nîmois	
Thomas Pickett	Kentish Town	14 June 1926		1932	Bristol City	
Tommy Wyper	Charlton	13 June 1931		Feb 32	Chester	
Joey Cunningham	Newport County	28 June 1929		May 1932	Walsall	
Wilson, Andy	Chelsea	7 October 1931	£1,000	May 32	Nimes (Fra)	
Bill Haley	Fulham	23 May 1931		cs 32	Dartford	
Alf Vango	Walthamstow Avenue	14 January 1931		June 32	Clapton Orient	
