= 1930–31 Queens Park Rangers F.C. season =

English football club season

Queens Park Rangers
1930–31 season
- Chairman: Charles W Fielding
- Manager: Bob Hewison, resigns 26 Mar; John Bowman appointed 26 March 1931
- Stadium: Loftus Road
- Football League Third Division South: 8th
- FA Cup: Round 3
- Top goalscorer: League: George Goddard 23; All: George Goddard 27
- Highest home attendance: 14,501 25 December 1930 vs Notts County
- Lowest home attendance: 6,193 2 May 1931 vs Bournemouth & Boscombe Athletic
- Average home league attendance: 8,795
- Biggest win: 7–1 vs Newport County 6 December 1930
- Biggest defeat: 0–6 vs Northampton Town 28 February 1931
Home colours	Away colours

The 1930–31 Queens Park Rangers season was the club's 40th season of existence and their 11th season in the Football League Third Division. QPR finished 8th in the league, and were eliminated in the third round of the FA Cup.

== League standings ==
Pos	Team	Pld	W	D	L	GF	GA	GAv	Pts
6	Northampton Town	42	18	12	12	77	59	1.305	48
7	Luton Town	42	19	8	15	76	51	1.490	46
8	Queens Park Rangers	42	20	3	19	82	75	1.093	43
9	Fulham	42	18	7	17	77	75	1.027	43
10	Bournemouth & Boscombe Athletic	42	15	13	14	72	73	0.986	43

=== Results ===
QPR scores given first

Win Draw Loss

=== Third Division South ===
Date	Venue	Opponent	Result	Score F–A	Scorers	Attendance	League Position
30 August 1930	H	Thames AFC	W	3–0	Hoten 2, Goddard	13,103	3
3 September 1930	A	Bournemouth & Boscombe Athletic	L	0–2		6,665	6
6 September 1930	A	Norwich City	D	1–1	Goddard	12,472	7
11 September 1930	H	Watford	L	2–3	Daniels, Goddard	8,114	16
13 September 1930	H	Brighton & Hove Albion	W	4–1	Coward, Burns, Rounce 2	6,582	7
17 September 1930	A	Watford	W	4–0	Wiles, H., Daniels, Coward, Rounce	6,606	4
20 September 1930	H	Walsall	W	3–0	Ferguson, Wiles, H., Burns	9,214	3
27 September 1930	A	Coventry City	L	0–2		12,529	6
4 October 1930	H	Fulham	L	0–2		14,280	9
11 October 1930	A	Swindon Town	L	1–4	Coward	6,151	15
18 October 1930	A	Torquay United	L	2–6	Burns, Wiles, H.	5,123	16
25 October 1930	H	Northampton Town	L	0–2		8,362	17
1 November 1930	A	Brentford	L	3–5	Sheppard, Nixon (pen), Coward	10,857	17
8 November 1930	H	Crystal Palace	W	4–0	Rounce 3 (1 pen), Coward	12,040	17
15 November 1930	A	Southend United	L	0–2		5,060	18
22 November 1930	H	Luton Town	W	3–1	Burns, Rounce, Sheppard	6,388	18
6 December 1930	H	Newport County	W	7–1	Rounce, Burns 2, Armstrong, Goddard 3	6,566	17
13 December 1930	A	Gillingham		PP			
17 December 1930	A	Gillingham	D	2–2	Goddard, Howe	2,204	14
20 December 1930	H	Exeter City	W	7–2	Goddard 4, Rounce 2, Coward	7,333	12
25 December 1930	H	Notts County	W	4–1	Burns 3, Goddard	14,501	9
26 December 1930	A	Notts County	L	0–2		13,696	11
27 December 1930	A	Thames AFC	L	0–1		3,899	12
3 January 1931	H	Norwich City	W	3–1	Goddard 2, Rounce	6,553	11
10 January 1931	A	Bristol Rovers		pp			
14 January 1931	A	Bristol Rovers	L	0–3		3,669	12
17 January 1931	A	Brighton & Hove Albion	D	1–1	Rounce	10,532	16
24 January 1931	A	Walsall	W	2–0	John (og), Hoten	4,573	11
31 January 1931	H	Coventry City	W	2–0	Howe, Rounce	7,180	11
7 February 1931	A	Fulham	W	2–0	Goddard, Coward	18,955	9
14 February 1931	H	Swindon Town	L	1–2	Daniels	7,914	12
21 February 1931	H	Torquay United	L	1–2	Burns	9,830	13
28 February 1931	A	Northampton Town	L	0–6		5,198	13
7 March 1931	H	Brentford	W	3–1	Howe, Goddard 2	10,331	13
14 March 1931	A	Crystal Palace	L	0–4		14,316	14
21 March 1931	H	Southend United	L	0–2		7,114	14
28 March 1931	A	Luton Town	L	1–5	Sheppard	6,035	15
3 April 1931	H	Clapton Orient	W	4–2	Whatmore, Sheppard, Goddard 2 (1 pen)	7,374	14
4 April 1931	H	Bristol Rovers	W	2–0	Rounce, Goddard	8,628	13
6 April 1931	A	Clapton Orient	W	3–2	Wiles, H., Goddard, Rounce	5,804	13
11 April 1931	A	Newport County	W	3–2	Goddard 2, Sheppard	2,899	11
18 April 1931	H	Gillingham	W	1–0	Wiles, H.	6,890	11
25 April 1931	A	Exeter City	L	0–2		3,280	12
2 May 1931	H	Bournemouth & Boscombe Athletic	W	3–0	Howe, Lewis, Rounce	6,193	8

=== F A Cup ===
Round	Date	Venue	Opponent	Result	Score F–A	Scorers	Attendance
FA Cup 1	29 November 1930	H	Thames (Third Division South)	W	5–0	Burns 2, Goddard 2 (1 pen), Rounce	9,000
FA Cup 2	13 December 1930	A	Crewe Alexandra (Third Division North)	W	4–2	Goddard 2, Howe, Rounce	8,200
FA Cup 3	10 January 1931	A	Bristol Rovers (Third Division South)	L	1–3	Coward	24,000

=== London Professional Charity Fund ===
Round	Date	Venue	Opponent	Result	Score F–A	Scorers	Attendance
	20 October 1930	H	Chelsea	W	3–0	Wiles H. 2, Sheppard	

=== London Challenge Cup ===
Round	Date	Venue	Opponent	Result	Score F–A	Scorers	Attendance
LCC 1	16 October 1930	A	Ilford	L	0–1		

=== Friendlies ===
16 August 1930	H	Hoops v Blues (H)
23 August 1930	H	Hoops v Blues (H)
10 February 1931	H	London University (H)
15 April 1931	A	Wycombe Wanderers

== Squad ==
Position	Nationality	Name	Third Division South		FA Cup		Total	
Position	Nationality	Name	Apps	Goals	Apps	Goals	Apps	Goals
GK	ENG	Thomas Pickett	11		1		12	
GK	ENG	Joey Cunningham	31		2		33	
DF	ENG	Jimmy Armstrong	30	1	2		32	1
DF	ENG	Tom Nixon	11	1			11	1
DF	ENG	George Wiles	13				13	
DF	ENG	Bernie Harris	28		3		31	
DF	ENG	Bob Pollard	28		3		31	
DF	ENG	Alf Vango	2				2	
DF	ENG	Norman Smith	24		1		25	
DF	ENG	Bill Pierce	4				4	
MF	ENG	Billy Coward	29	7	3	1	32	8
MF	ENG	Harry Wiles	11	5			11	5
MF	ENG	Arthur Sales	28		3		31	
MF	ENG	Jim Lewis	1	1			1	1
MF	ENG	Bert Stephenson	2				2	
MF	ENG	Sid Embleton	3				3	
FW	ENG	George Goddard	28	23	3	4	31	27
FW	ENG	George Rounce	35	16	3	2	38	18
FW	ENG	Harold Howe	18	4	3	1	21	5
FW	ENG	Ernie Whatmore	31	1	3		34	2
FW	ENG	Walter Tutt	1				1	
FW	SCO	Chris Ferguson	15	1			15	1
FW	ENG	Ralph Hoten	8	3			8	3
FW	ENG	Jackie Burns	33	10	3	2	36	12
FW	ENG	Albert Legge	9				9	
FW	ENG	Arthur Daniels	14	3			14	3
FW	ENG	Bill Sheppard	14	5			14	5

== Transfers in ==
Name	from	Date	Fee
Sid Embleton	Walthamstow Avenue	3 July 1930	
Smith, Norman	Sheffield W	15 August 1930	£300
Curwen, Billy	Luton	Sep 1930	
Kendrick, Horace *	Leamington Town	3 September 1930	
Eggleton, Albert *	Canterbury Waverley	8 September 1930	
Tutt, Wally	Canterbury Waverley	8 September 1930	
Brunning, Arthur *		11 September 1930	
Morton, William	Blyth Spartans	17 November 1930	
Ferrari, Fred	Mansfield	Jan1931	
Alf Vango	Walthamstow Avenue	14 January 1931	
Len Featherby	Reading	16 May 1931	
Bill Haley	Fulham	23 May 1931	
Stan Cribb	West Ham	8 June 1931	
Tommy Wyper	Charlton	13 June 1931	
Fred Marlow		24 June 1931	

== Transfers out ==
Name	from	Date	Fee	Date	To	Fee
Potter, Victor *	Ilford	4 September 1928		1930		
Nickless, Fred *	Maidenhead United	16 January 1929		1930	Windsor & Eton	
Anglish, Albert *	Southall	28 June 1929		1930	Southall	
Moffat, Harold	Walsall	7 May 1929		cs 1930	Workington	
Hebden, George	Gillingham	23 November 1929		cs 1930	Retired	
Young, Bert	Newport	28 June 1929		July 1930	Bristol R	
Kendrick, Horace *	Leamington Town	3 September 1930		Oct 1930	Leamington Town	
Curwen, Billy	Luton	Sep 1930		Oct 1930	Thames	
Morton, William	Blyth Spartans	17 November 1930		Jan 1931	Craghead U	
Alf Vango	Walthamstow Avenue	14 January 1931		Feb 1931	Chelmsford	Loan
Jack Burns	Crypto	14 May 1927		May 1931	Brentford	
Arthur Daniels	Watford	5 June 1930	£100	May 1931		Free
Albert Legge	Charlton	24 May 1930		cs 1931	Wellington Town	
George Collins	Leyton	6 September 1928		cs 1931	Fulham	Free
