= 1928–29 Queens Park Rangers F.C. season =

English football club season

Queens Park Rangers
1928–29 season
- Chairman: Charles W Fielding
- Manager: Bob Hewison
- Stadium: Loftus Road
- Football League Third Division South: 6th
- FA Cup: 1st Round
- London Challenge Cup: 2nd Round
- Top goalscorer: League: George Goddard 37; All: George Goddard 38
- Highest home attendance: 21,916 (20 April 1929) Vs Northampton Town
- Lowest home attendance: 8,201 (15 December 1928) Vs Coventry City
- Average home league attendance: 13,487
- Biggest win: 8–0 Vs Merthyr Town (9 March 1929)
- Biggest defeat: 0–5 Vs Fulham (26 January 1929)
Home colours	Away colours

The 1928–29 Queens Park Rangers season was the club's 38th season of existence and their 9th season in the Football League Third Division. QPR finished 6th in the league, and were eliminated in the first round of the 1928–29 FA Cup. QPR lead the league until matchday 40, before a run of poor results left them further down the table. Former Chairman J H Fielding passed in early August 1928

== League standings ==
Pos	Team	Pld	W	D	L	GF	GA	GAv	Pts
4	Plymouth Argyle	42	20	12	10	83	51	1.627	52
5	Fulham	42	21	10	11	101	71	1.423	52
6	Queens Park Rangers	42	19	14	9	82	61	1.344	52
7	Luton Town	42	19	11	12	89	73	1.219	49
8	Watford	42	19	10	13	79	74	1.068	48

=== Results ===
QPR scores given first

Win Draw Loss

=== Third Division South ===
Date	Venue	Opponent	Result	Score F–A	Scorers	Attendance	League Position
25 August 1928	A	Torquay United	W	4–3	Goddard 3, Burns	7,357	8
30 August 1928	H	Newport County	D	0–0		9,920	7
1 September 1928	H	Gillingham	W	1–0	Coward	12,969	2
6 September 1928	A	Newport County	D	0–0		5,293	2
8 September 1928	A	Plymouth Argyle	W	2–1	Goddard 2	10,303	2
15 September 1928	H	Fulham	W	2–1	Young (pen), Goddard	21,805	3
22 September 1928	A	Brentford	D	1–1	Smith	20,783	3
29 September 1928	A	Bristol Rovers	D	1–1	Goddard	8,928	2
6 October 1928	H	Watford	W	3–2	Goddard, McNab, Coward	18,263	2
13 October 1928	A	Walsall	L	1–3	Rounce	7,441	3
20 October 1928	H	Bournemouth & Boscombe Athletic	D	0–0		11,815	3
27 October 1928	A	Merthyr Town	W	2–1	Rounce (pen), Goddard	2,446	3
3 November 1928	H	Southend United	W	3–1	Burns, Rounce, Goddard	12,701	3
10 November 1928	A	Exeter City	D	1–1	Burns	4,483	3
17 November 1928	H	Brighton & Hove Albion	W	3–2	Goddard, Young (pen), Rounce	11,065	3
1 December 1928	H	Charlton Athletic	D	2–2	Goddard 2	10,491	3
8 December 1928	A	Northampton Town	L	2–4	Goddard 2	10,124	4
15 December 1928	H	Coventry City	W	3–1	Rogers 2, Goddard	8,201	2
22 December 1928	A	Luton Town	L	2–3	Goddard 2	9,112	5
25 December 1928	H	Swindon Town	W	4–2	Rogers, Burns, Goddard, Kellard	14,962	3
26 December 1928	A	Swindon Town	L	1–2	Dickenson (og)	9,392	5
29 December 1928	H	Torquay United	W	5–1	Goddard 3, Burns, Coward	11,471	3
5 January 1929	A	Gillingham	D	0–0		4,493	2
12 January 1929	A	Norwich City		PP			
19 January 1929	H	Plymouth Argyle	W	2–0	Burns, McNab	17,913	2
26 January 1929	A	Fulham	L	0–5		26,743	3
2 February 1929	H	Brentford	D	2–2	Coward, Herod (og)	10,590	3
9 February 1929	H	Bristol Rovers	L	0–3		10,736	5
16 February 1929	A	Watford	L	1–4	Rogers	7,185	5
23 February 1929	H	Walsall	D	2–2	Goddard, Young (pen)	8,762	5
2 March 1929	A	Bournemouth & Boscombe Athletic	W	3–2	Hayward (og), Rounce, Goddard	5,045	5
9 March 1929	H	Merthyr Town	W	8–0	Goddard 4, Rounce, Burns 3	11,611	5
16 March 1929	A	Southend United	W	3–0	Burns 2, Goddard	6,259	4
23 March 1929	H	Exeter City	W	1–0	Goddard	12,294	3
29 March 1929	A	Crystal Palace	W	4–1	Goddard 3, Coward	33,160	1
30 March 1929	A	Brighton & Hove Albion	L	1–2	Pierce	9,413	3
1 April 1929	H	Crystal Palace	D	1–1	Goddard	19,341	3
6 April 1929	H	Norwich City	W	3–0	Coward 2, Rounce	12,961	2
13 April 1929	A	Charlton Athletic	D	2–2	Rounce, Coward	17,258	2
20 April 1929	H	Northampton Town	W	4–1	Rounce, Goddard, Burns, Whatmore	21,916	1
22 April 1929	A	Norwich City	L	1–3	Goddard	7,670	2
27 April 1929	A	Coventry City	D	0–0		11,698	3
4 May 1929	H	Luton Town	D	1–1	Goddard	13,449	6

=== FA Cup ===
Round	Date	Venue	Opponent	Result	Score F–A	Scorers	Attendance
FA Cup 1	24 November 1928	A	Guildford City (Southern League)	L	2–4	Goddard, Burns	8,000

=== London Professional Charity Fund ===
Date	Venue	Opponent	Result	Score F–A	Scorers	Attendance
12 November 1928	H	Brentford	L	0–1		2,000

=== London Challenge Cup ===
Round	Date	Venue	Opponent	Result	Score F–A	Scorers	Attendance
LCC 1	15 October 1928	H	Arsenal	W	5–1	Rounce, Coward, Vallance 3	2,000
LCC 2	29 October 1928	H	Tottenham	D	1–1	Rounce	
LCC Re	5 November 1928	A	Tottenham	L	1–3	Rounce	3,371

=== Friendlies ===
11 August 1928	Trial Match (H)	H	PP
14 August 1928	Trial Match (H)	H	
18 August 1928	Trial Match (H)	H	

== Squad ==
Position	Nationality	Name	Third Division South		FA Cup		Total	
Position	Nationality	Name	Apps	Goals	Apps	Goals	Apps	Goals
GK	ENG	Joey Cunningham	38				38	
GK	ENG	Joe Woodward	4		1		5	
DF	ENG	Jimmy Armstrong	1				1	
DF	ENG	Tom Nixon	5				5	
DF	ENG	George Wiles						
DF	ENG	Bernie Harris						
DF	ENG	Bill Pierce	12	1			12	1
DF	ENG	Bill Cockburn	35		1		36	
DF	ENG	Sid Sweetman	42		1		43	
DF	ENG	John Young	28	3	1		29	3
MF	ENG	Billy Coward	39	8	1		40	8
MF	ENG	Harry Wiles						
MF	ENG	Bert Rogers	11	4			11	4
MF	ENG	Jack Yates						
MF	SCO	Andy Neil	29		1		30	
MF	SCO	Jock McNab	32	2	1		33	2
MF	ENG	Cyril Foster	3				3	
MF	ENG	Charles Evans						
MF	ENG	Jimmy Eggleton	4				4	
MF	ENG	Ollie Thompson	18				18	
FW	ENG	George Goddard	42	37	1	1	43	38
FW	ENG	George Rounce	28	9	1		29	9
FW	ENG	Ernie Whatmore	21	1			21	1
FW	ENG	Jackie Burns	37	12	1	1	38	13
FW	ENG	Harold Moffat						
FW	ENG	Steve Smith	24	1	1		25	1
FW	ENG	Bert Young						
FW	ENG	Thomas Kellard	4	1			4	1
FW		Jack Johnson	1				1	
FW	ENG	Hugh Vallance	1				1	
FW	ENG	Lew Price	3				3	

== Transfers in ==
Name	from	Date	Fee
Dempsey, Bill	Brentford	July1928	
Hart, Harry	Folkestone	14 July 1928	
Bill Cockburn	Liverpool	4 August 1928	
Victor Potter	Ilford	4 September 1928	
George Collins	Leyton	6 September 1928	
Charles Evans	Leagrave & District	10 October 1928	
Dudley Lewis	Bath City	15 October 1928	
Bert Rogers	Southall	2 November 1928	
Liddle, Fred	Crawcrook Albion	7 December 1928	
Fred Nickless	Maidenhead United	16 January 1929	
James Snow	Maidenhead United	16 January 1929	
Bert Stephenson	Walthamstow Avenue	14 March 1929	
George Wiles	Sittingbourne	30 April 1929	
Joe Groome	Watford	4 May 1929	Free
Jack Yates	Aston Villa	7 May 1929	
Harold Moffat	Walsall	7 May 1929	
Harry Wiles	Sittingbourne	9 May 1929	
Tommy Gretton	Wolverhampton	23 May 1929	
Bernie Harris	Luton	22 June 1929	
Thomas Pickett	Kentish Town	28 June 1929	
Bert Young	Newport	28 June 1929	
Joey Cunningham	Newport County	28 June 1929	
Albert Anglish	Southall	28 June 1929	

== Transfers out ==
Name	from	Date	Fee	Date	To	Fee
Brown, Thomas		4 November 1927		cs 28		
Drew, Bill *	Barnet	11 August 1926		cs 28	Tufnell Park	
Paterson, John (Jock)	Mid-Rhondda U	11 January 1926	£750	28 July	Mansfield	
Collier, Jock	Hull	29 June 1926	Free	28 July	York (player-manager)	
Swan, John (Jack)	Watford	9 February 1927	£300	28 July	Thames	Free
Duthie, John	Fraserburgh	12 September 1927	Free	28 Aug	York	
Lofthouse, Jimmy	Bristol R	21 May 1926	Free	28 Aug	Aldershot	
Roberts, Joe	Watford	18 May 1927	Free	28 Aug	York	
Stephenson, Jimmy	Watford	12 July 1927	Free	28 Aug	Boston Town	Free
Beats, Eddie	Aston Villa	29 July 1927		28 Aug	Guildford City	
James Snow	Maidenhead United	16 January 1929		29	Maidenhead U	
Mike Gilhooley	Bradford C	26 May 1927		29 Feb	Troon Athletic	Free
Harold Ellis	Swanley	4 February 1928		29 Feb		Free
Arrowsmith, John	Bilston U	27 March 1928		29 Feb	Stafford Rangers	Free
Lew Price	Notts County	21 May 1928	Free	29 Feb	Grantham Town	Free
Hugh Vallance	Aston Villa	14 May 1928		29 May	Brighton	
Hart, Harry	Folkestone	14 July 1928		29 May	Retired	
Jack Johnson	Swindon	26 May 1927		29 May	Retired	
Sid Sweetman	Hampstead Town	8 December 1924		29 May	Millwall	£5,000
Steve Smith	Clapton Orient	10 May 1928		29 June	Mansfield	
Ollie Thompson	Chesterfield	10 May 1928		29 June	York	
Joe Woodward	Clapton Orient	24 February 1928		29 June	Merthyr Town	
Bill Dempsey	Brentford	July1928		29 June	Tunbridge Wells	
Fred Liddle	Crawcrook Albion	7 December 1928		29 June	Huddersfield	
