= 1929–30 Queens Park Rangers F.C. season =

English football club season

Queens Park Rangers
1929–30 season
- Chairman: Charles W Fielding
- Manager: Bob Hewison
- Stadium: Loftus Road
- Football League Third Division South: 3rd
- F A Cup: Round 3
- London Challenge Cup: Round 1
- Top goalscorer: League: George Goddard (37); All: George Goddard (39)
- Highest home attendance: 22,179 Vs Brentford (18 April 1930)
- Lowest home attendance: 2,360 Vs Torquay United (16 November 1929)
- Average home league attendance: 11,533
- Biggest win: 8–3 Vs Swindon Town (12 April 1930)
- Biggest defeat: 0–4 Vs Plymouth Argyle (5 April 1930), Walsall (9 September 1929)
Home colours	Away colours

The 1929–30 Queens Park Rangers season was the club's 39th season of existence and their 10th season in the Football League Third Division. QPR finished 3rd in the league, and were eliminated in the third round of the 1929–30 FA Cup.

== Season summary ==
Striker George Goddard's 37 goals won the golden boot in the league and also set a QPR and league record. During the campaign, the FA ordered the closure of Loftus Road for two weeks as a result of crowd trouble and had to play outside a six-mile radius. So on 1 March, the League Division 3 match against Coventry City was played at Highbury

== League standings ==
Pos	Team	Pld	W	D	L	GF	GA	GAv	Pts	Promotion or relegation
1	Plymouth Argyle (C, P)	42	30	8	4	98	38	2.579	68	Promotion to the Second Division
2	Brentford	42	28	5	9	94	44	2.136	61	
3	Queens Park Rangers	42	21	9	12	80	68	1.176	51	
4	Northampton Town	42	21	8	13	82	58	1.414	50	
5	Brighton & Hove Albion	42	21	8	13	87	63	1.381	50	

(C) Champions; (P) Promoted

=== Results ===
QPR scores given first

Win Draw Loss

=== Third Division South ===
Date	Venue	Opponent	Result	Score F–A	Scorers	Attendance	League Position
31 August 1929	A	Crystal Palace	D	1–1	Wiles, H.	20,268	14
5 September 1929	H	Walsall	D	2–2	Moffat, Goddard	8,539	12
7 September 1929	H	Gillingham	W	2–1	Goddard, Moffat	11,875	8
9 September 1929	A	Walsall	L	0–4		5,579	8
14 September 1929	A	Northampton Town	L	1–2	Rounce	12,876	13
16 September 1929	H	Fulham	D	0–0		12,491	12
21 September 1929	H	Exeter City	W	2–0	Young, B., Rounce	11,071	10
28 September 1929	A	Southend United	L	0–1		10,867	12
5 October 1929	H	Luton Town	W	1–0	Goddard	12,273	10
12 October 1929	A	Bournemouth & Boscombe Athletic	D	0–0		8,371	10
19 October 1929	H	Clapton Orient	D	1–1	Rounce	14,130	13
26 October 1929	A	Coventry City	W	3–2	Howe 2, Goddard	13,477	11
2 November 1929	H	Watford	D	0–0		12,774	11
9 November 1929	A	Newport County	W	5–4	Goddard, Wiles, H. 3, Rounce	3,527	9
16 November 1929	H	Torquay United	D	1–1	Fowler (og)	2,360	9
7 December 1929	A	Swindon Town	D	2–2	Coward, Howe	3,954	12
21 December 1929	A	Bristol Rovers	L	1–4	Goddard	6,539	13
25 December 1929	A	Norwich City	L	0–3		11,163	13
26 December 1929	H	Norwich City	W	3–2	Goddard 3	13,530	12
28 December 1929	H	Crystal Palace	W	4–1	Rounce 2 (1 pen), Burns, Goddard	12,709	10
4 January 1930	A	Gillingham	L	1–3	Goddard	5,961	11
18 January 1930	H	Northampton Town	L	0–2		11,696	11
25 January 1930	A	Exeter City	W	2–0	Moffat, Goddard	5,653	11
1 February 1930	H	Southend United	L	2–5	Rounce, Goddard	8,187	11
8 February 1930	A	Luton Town	L	1–2	Goddard	7,049	13
15 February 1930	H	Bournemouth & Boscombe Athletic	W	3–1	Coward, Goddard 2 (1 pen)	9,464	11
22 February 1930	A	Clapton Orient	W	4–2	Goddard 2, Rounce 2 (1 pen)	12,816	12
1 March 1930	Highbury	Coventry City	W	3–1	Armstrong, Howe 2	17,903	12
3 March 1930	A	Merthyr Town	W	4–1	Wiles, H., Goddard 3	963	10
8 March 1930	A	Watford	D	1–1	Brelsford (og)	11,577	11
13 March 1930	H	Plymouth Argyle	L	1–2	Goddard (pen)	8,758	11
15 March 1930	H	Newport County	W	4–1	Goddard 3, Wheeler (og)	7,926	10
22 March 1930	A	Torquay United	W	3–1	Armstrong, Burns, Rounce	4,335	8
27 March 1930	H	Brighton & Hove Albion	W	3–1	Goddard 2, Marsden (og)	6,578	5
29 March 1930	H	Merthyr Town	W	2–0	Goddard, Rounce	10,568	5
5 April 1930	A	Plymouth Argyle	L	0–4		18,897	5
12 April 1930	H	Swindon Town	W	8–3	Rounce 3, Coward, Goddard 4	7,534	5
18 April 1930	H	Brentford	W	2–1	Rounce, Goddard (pen)	22,179	5
19 April 1930	A	Brighton & Hove Albion	W	3–2	Goddard 3	6,411	4
21 April 1930	A	Brentford	L	0–3		18,549	4
26 April 1930	H	Bristol Rovers	W	2–1	Wiles, H., Armstrong	7,616	4
3 May 1930	A	Fulham	W	2–0	Rounce, Goddard	17,030	3

=== F A Cup ===
Round	Date	Venue	Opponent	Result	Score F–A	Scorers	Attendance
FACup 1	30 November 1929	A	Luton Town (Third Division South)	W	3–2	Goddard, Coward, Pierce (pen)	9,000
FACup 2	14 December 1929	H	Lincoln City (Third Division North)	W	2–1	Burns 2	13,097
FACup 3	11 January 1930	A	Charlton Athletic (Second Division)	D	1–1	Goddard	22,300
FACup 3 Rep	16 January 1930	H	Charlton Athletic (Second Division)	L	0–3		20,000

=== London Professional Charity Fund ===
Date	Venue	Opponent	Result	Score F–A	Scorers	Attendance
21 October 1929	A	Chelsea	W	3–2	Coward 2, Burns	4,000

=== London Challenge Cup ===
Round	Date	Venue	Opponent	Result	Score F–A	Scorers	Attendance
LCC1	14 October 1929	A	Millwall	L	3–4	Goddard 3	5,000

=== Friendlies ===
17 August 1929	Trial Match	H	
24 August 1929	Hoops v Blues	H	
30 April 1930	Watford	A	George Prior Testimonial

== Squad ==
Position	Nationality	Name	Third Division South		FA Cup		Total	
Position	Nationality	Name	Apps	Goals	Apps	Goals	Apps	Goals
GK	(England)	Thomas Pickett	1		1			
GK	(England)	Joey Cunningham	36		3			
GK	(England)	George Hebden	1					
GK	(England)	Tommy Gretton	4					
DF	(England)	Jimmy Armstrong	20	3				
DF	(England)	Tom Nixon	13					
DF	(England)	George Wiles	5					
DF	(England)	Bernie Harris	17					
DF	(England)	Bob Pollard	27		4			
DF	(England)	Bill Pierce	25		4	1		
DF	(England)	Bill Cockburn	22		4			
MF	(England)	Billy Coward	25	3	4	1		
MF	(England)	Harry Wiles	10	6				
MF	(England)	Bert Rogers	1					
MF	(England)	Jack Yates	10					
MF	(Scotland)	Andy Neil	36		4			
MF	(Scotland)	Jock McNab	22		4			
MF	(England)	Cyril Foster	2					
MF	(England)	Charles Evans	1					
FW	(England)	George Goddard	41	37	4	2		
FW	(England)	George Rounce	40	16	4			
FW	(England)	Harold Howe	28	5	3			
FW	(England)	Ernie Whatmore	15					
FW	(England)	Jackie Burns	31	2	4	2		
FW	(England)	Harold Moffat	15	3				
FW	(England)	Bert Young	14	1	1			

== Transfers in ==
Name	from	Date	Fee
Bob Pollard	Exeter City	23 August 1929	
Howe, Harold	Watford	6 September 1929	
Bazin, Sydney *	Walthamstow Avenue	20 September 1929	
Jim Lewis	Walthamstow Avenue	30 September 1929	
Spencer, Teddy *	Walthamstow Avenue	19 October 1929	
George Hebden,	Gillingham	23 November 1929	
Norman Smith	Sheffield Wednesday	1930	
Hall, Ernie	Bedworth Town	6 May 1930	
Ferguson, Chris	Chelsea	6 May 1930	Free
Trodd, Billy *	Leyton	8 May 1930	
Arthur Sales	Chelsea	9 May 1930	Free
Albert Legge	Charlton	24 May 1930	
Hoten, Ralph	Northampton	30 May 1930	
Arthur Daniels	Watford	7 June 1930	£100
Bill Sheppard	Watford	11 June 1930	
James Ward	Southall	28 June 1930	

== Transfers out ==
Name	from	Date	Fee	Date	To	Fee
Harrison, Gerard *	Atherstone Town	28 March 1928		cs 1929	Rugby Town	
Mizen, John *	Swanley	28 September 1927		cs 1929		
Hunt, Leslie *	Stonebridge	28 August 1925		cs 1929		
Young, Harry *	Southall	Oct 1926		cs 1929		
Wilkins, Albert *	Redhill	6 February 1928		cs 1929		
Rounce, Albert *	Tilbury	29 June 1928		cs 1929		
Young, Jack	West Ham	10 May 1926		Aug 1929	Accrington Stanley	
Crompton, Norman	Oldham	2 May 1928		Aug 1929	Dartford	
Kellard, Tom	Oldham	2 May 1928	Free	Aug 1929	Burton Town	
Mustard, Jack	Crawcrook Albion	13 October 1926		Sep 1929	South Shields	
Bazin, Sydney *	Walthamstow Avenue	20 September 1929		Nov 1929	Walthamstow Avenue	
Victor Potter	4 September 1928	Ilford		1930		
Fred Nickless	16 January 1929	Maidenhead United		1930	Windsor & Eton	
Albert Anglish	28 June 1929	Southall		1930	Southall	
Groome, Joe	Watford	4 May 1929	Free	Feb 1930	Dartford	Free
Tommy Gretton	23 May 1929	Wolverhampton		May 1930	Walsall	
Andy Neil	10 May 1927	Brighton	Free	May 1930	Retired	
Charles Evans	10 October 1928	Leagrave & District		May 1930	Watford	Free
Jock McNab	14 June 1928	Liverpool		May 1930	Retired	
Bert Rogers	2 November 1928	Southall		May 1930		
Cyril Foster	30 June 1928	Watford		May 1930	Scunthorpe	
Bill Cockburn,	4 August 1928	Liverpool		June 1930	Swindon	
