= 1925–26 Queens Park Rangers F.C. season =

English football club season

Queens Park Rangers
1925–26 season
- Manager: Bob Hewison
- Stadium: Loftus Road
- Football League Third Division South: 22nd
- FA Cup: 2nd round
- London Challenge Cup: 1st round
- Top goalscorer: League: Dick Burgess 8 All: Dick Burgess 9
- Highest home attendance: 13,085 vs Brentford (6 February 1926)
- Lowest home attendance: 3,377 vs Southend United (4 March 1926)
- Average home league attendance: 7,758
- Biggest win: 3 – 0 (28 December 1925) vs Millwall
- Biggest defeat: 0 – 5 (3 October 1925) vs Bristol Rovers
| Home colours | Away colours |

The 1925–26 Queens Park Rangers season was the club's 35th season of existence and their 6th season in the Football League Third Division. QPR finished 22nd in the league, and were eliminated in the second round of the 1925–26 FA Cup. Club record Goal scorer Jimmy Birch transferred to Brentford at the end of the season

== League standings ==
| Pos | Team | Pld | W | D | L | GF | GA | GAv | Pts | Promotion |
|---|---|---|---|---|---|---|---|---|---|---|
| 18 | Brentford | 42 | 16 | 6 | 20 | 69 | 94 | 0.734 | 38 | |
| 19 | Bristol Rovers | 42 | 15 | 6 | 21 | 66 | 69 | 0.957 | 36 | |
| 20 | Exeter City | 42 | 15 | 5 | 22 | 72 | 70 | 1.029 | 35 | |
| 21 | Charlton Athletic | 42 | 11 | 13 | 18 | 48 | 68 | 0.706 | 35 | Re-elected |
| 22 | Queens Park Rangers | 42 | 6 | 9 | 27 | 37 | 84 | 0.440 | 21 | Re-elected |

=== Results ===
QPR scores given first

Win Draw Loss

=== Third Division South ===
| Date | Venue | Opponent | Result | Score F–A | Scorers | Attendance | League Position |
|---|---|---|---|---|---|---|---|
| 29 August 1925 | A | Gillingham | L | 0–3 | | 7,612 | 22 |
| 3 September 1925 | H | Reading | L | 1–2 | Campbell | 9,313 | 21 |
| 5 September 1925 | H | Merthyr Town | D | 1–1 | Spottiswood | 8,284 | 19 |
| 9 September 1925 | A | Reading | L | 1–2 | Burgess | 8,754 | 19 |
| 12 September 1925 | A | Newport County | L | 1–4 | Burgess | 8,834 | 20 |
| 19 September 1925 | H | Luton Town | W | 1–0 | Johnson | 5, 196 | 20 |
| 23 September 1925 | A | Exeter City | L | 0–3 | | 5,034 | 20 |
| 26 September 1925 | A | Brentford | W | 2–1 | Johnson, Birch | 9,719 | 20 |
| 3 October 1925 | A | Bristol Rovers | L | 0–5 | | 7,110 | 21 |
| 8 October 1925 | H | Exeter City | D | 0–0 | | 4,154 | 21 |
| 10 October 1925 | H | Swindon Town | D | 1–1 | Middleton | 9,877 | 20 |
| 17 October 1925 | H | Watford | W | 2–0 | Whitehead, Middleton | 10,711 | 20 |
| 24 October 1925 | A | Brighton & Hove Albion | L | 1–2 | Middleton | 8,816 | 20 |
| 31 October 1925 | H | Bristol City | L | 0–2 | | 8,494 | 20 |
| 7 November 1925 | A | Crystal Palace | L | 0–1 | | 11,829 | 22 |
| 14 November 1925 | h | Millwall | | pp | | | |
| 21 November 1925 | A | Norwich City | D | 1–1 | Whitehead | 6,258 | 22 |
| 5 December 1925 | A | Plymouth Argyle | L | 1–3 | Whitehead | 11,287 | 22 |
| 12 December 1925 | h | Aberdare Athletic | | pp | | | |
| 19 December 1925 | A | Northampton Town | L | 2–3 | Spottiswood, Burgess | 5,495 | 22 |
| 25 December 1925 | H | Charlton Athletic | D | 2–2 | Brown, Burgess | 8,747 | 22 |
| 26 December 1925 | A | Charlton Athletic | D | 1–1 | Burgess | 11,745 | 22 |
| 28 December 1925 | H | Millwall | W | 3–0 | Whitehead, Cable 2 | 8,000 | 22 |
| 2 January 1926 | H | Gillingham | L | 0–1 | | 7,287 | 22 |
| 9 January 1926 | h | Southend United | | pp | | | |
| 16 January 1926 | A | Merthyr Town | L | 0–1 | | 4,378 | 22 |
| 23 January 1926 | H | Newport County | L | 0–2 | | 6,385 | 22 |
| 30 January 1926 | A | Luton Town | L | 0–4 | | 6,750 | 22 |
| 6 February 1926 | H | Brentford | D | 1–1 | Burgess | 13,085 | 22 |
| 13 February 1926 | H | Bristol Rovers | W | 2–1 | Brown, Ford (pen) | 6,975 | 22 |
| 20 February 1926 | A | Swindon Town | L | 0–2 | | 6,063 | 22 |
| 25 February 1926 | H | Aberdare Athletic | L | 1–3 | Burgess | 4,385 | 22 |
| 27 February 1926 | A | Watford | L | 1–3 | Young | 6,578 | 22 |
| 4 March 1926 | H | Southend United | D | 2–2 | Paterson, Young | 3,377 | 22 |
| 6 March 1926 | H | Brighton & Hove Albion | L | 0–2 | | 8,799 | 22 |
| 13 March 1926 | A | Bristol City | L | 1–3 | Paterson | 12,183 | 22 |
| 20 March 1926 | H | Crystal Palace | L | 1–3 | Burgess | 8,389 | 22 |
| 27 March 1926 | A | Millwall | L | 0–3 | | 12,862 | 22 |
| 2 April 1926 | H | Bournemouth & Boscombe Athletic | D | 2–2 | Whitehead, Paterson | 7,065 | 22 |
| 3 April 1926 | H | Norwich City | L | 0–1 | | 6,006 | 22 |
| 5 April 1926 | A | Bournemouth & Boscombe Athletic | L | 1–4 | Rowe | 5,576 | 22 |
| 10 April 1926 | A | Southend United | L | 1–2 | Middleton | 6,398 | 22 |
| 17 April 1926 | H | Plymouth Argyle | L | 0–4 | | 9,338 | 22 |
| 24 April 1926 | A | Aberdare Athletic | L | 0–1 | | 3,526 | 22 |
| 1 May 1926 | H | Northampton Town | W | 3–2 | Birch 2, Middleton | 4,586 | 22 |

=== F A Cup ===
| Round | Date | Venue | Opponent | Result | Score F–A | Scorers | Attendance |
|---|---|---|---|---|---|---|---|
| FACup 1 | 28 November 1925 | A | Northfleet U (Kent League Div 1) | D | 2–2 | Birch 2 | 5,165 |
| FAC 1 R | 3 December 1925 | H | Northfleet U (Kent League Div 1) | W | 2–0 | Burgess, Thompson | 6,000 |
| FACup 2 | 12 December 1925 | H | Charlton (Division 3 South) | D | 1–1 | Hirst | 11,000 |
| FACup 2 Rep | 17 December 1925 | A | Charlton (Division 3 South) | L | 0–1 | | 7,246 |

=== London Professional Charity Fund ===
| Date | Venue | Opponent | Result | Score F–A | Scorers | Attendance |
|---|---|---|---|---|---|---|
| 16 November 1925 | A | Tottenham | L | 0–1 | | 1,396 |

=== London Challenge Cup ===
| Round | Date | Venue | Opponent | Result | Score F–A | Scorers | Attendance |
|---|---|---|---|---|---|---|---|
| LCC 1 | 14 September 1925 | A | Clapton Orient | L | 1–2 | Harrold (og) | |

=== Friendlies ===
| 17 August 1925 | H | Stripes v Greens (H) | |
| 22 August 1925 | H | Possibles v Probables (H) | |
| 7 January 1926 | A | Fulham | Friendly |
| 9 January 1926 | H | Watford | Friendly |

== Squad ==
| Position | Nationality | Name | Third Division South | | FA Cup | | Total | |
| Position | Nationality | Name | Apps | Goals | Apps | Goals | Apps | Goals |
|---|---|---|---|---|---|---|---|---|
| GK | ENG | Joey Cunningham | | | | | | |
| GK | ENG | George Hebden | 36 | | 4 | | 40 | |
| GK | ENG | Bill Field | 4 | | | | 4 | |
| DF | ENG | Bill Pierce | 35 | | 4 | | 39 | |
| DF | ENG | Sid Sweetman | 16 | | | | 16 | |
| DF | ENG | John Young | | | | | | |
| DF | ENG | George Harris | 14 | | | | 14 | |
| DF | ENG | Cecil Gough | | | | | | |
| DF | ENG | Jack Middleton | 26 | 5 | | | 26 | 5 |
| DF | ENG | Ernie Symes | 18 | | 4 | | 22 | |
| DF | SCO | Adam Plunkett | 15 | | | | 15 | |
| DF | WAL | Reg John | 26 | | 4 | | 30 | |
| DF | ENG | John Thompson | 13 | | 3 | 1 | 16 | 1 |
| DF | ENG | Charlie Campbell | 4 | 1 | | | 4 | 1 |
| DF | ENG | Steve Munden | 1 | | | | 1 | |
| DF | SCO | Andy Kerr | 2 | | | | 2 | |
| MF | ENG | Joe Spottiswood | 22 | 2 | | | 22 | 2 |
| MF | ENG | Billy Barr | 2 | | | | 2 | |
| MF | SCO | Hugh Richmond | 10 | | | | 10 | |
| MF | ENG | George Charlesworth | | | | | | |
| MF | SCO | Jock Collier | | | | | | |
| MF | ENG | Fred Hawley | | | | | | |
| MF | ENG | Tommy Cable | 13 | 2 | | | 13 | 2 |
| MF | ENG | Harry Salt | | | | | | |
| MF | ENG | Bill Pigg | 19 | | 4 | | 23 | |
| MF | ENG | Harry Hirst | 26 | | 4 | 1 | 30 | 1 |
| MF | ENG | Charlie Brown | 27 | 2 | 1 | | 28 | 2 |
| MF | ENG | John Hamilton | | | | | | |
| MF | ENG | Bill Young | 7 | 2 | | | 7 | 2 |
| MF | ENG | Joe Edwards | 3 | | | | 3 | |
| FW | ENG | George Goddard | | | | | | |
| FW | ENG | Jimmy Lofthouse | | | | | | |
| FW | SCO | Jock Paterson | 19 | 3 | | | 19 | 3 |
| FW | ENG | Percy Varco | | | | | | |
| FW | ENG | Dick Burgess | 32 | 8 | 4 | 1 | 36 | 9 |
| FW | ENG | Joe Wilcox | | | | | | |
| FW | ENG | Sid Smith | 2 | | | | 2 | |
| FW | ENG | Jimmy Birch | 15 | 3 | 4 | 2 | 19 | 5 |
| FW | ENG | Harry Johnson | 9 | 2 | | | 9 | 2 |
| FW | ENG | Ewart Ford | 18 | 1 | 4 | | 22 | 1 |
| FW | ENG | Alf Rowe | 4 | 1 | | | 4 | 1 |
| FW | ENG | Bill Whitehead | 24 | 5 | 4 | | 28 | 5 |

== Transfers in ==
| Name | from | Date | Fee |
|---|---|---|---|
| Adam Plunkett | Bury | 1 July 1925 | |
| Joe Edwards | | 27 August 1925 | |
| Alf Rowe | Plymouth | 27 August 1925 | |
| Leslie Hunt | Stonebridge | 28 August 1925 | |
| David Birnie | Acton | 28 August 1925 | |
| Ted Miller | Clapton | 10 September 1925 | |
| Billy Barr | London Caledonians | 10 September 1925 | |
| Thomas Pierce | Ashington Y.M.C.A. | 14 September 1925 | |
| Herbert Etheridge | | 19 September 1925 | |
| Bill Whitehead | Swansea Town | 15 October 1925 | |
| Sid Smith | Guildford U | 24 October 1925 | |
| Harry Higginbotham | Reading | 25 October 1925 | |
| Tommy Cable | Leyton | 13 November 1925 | |
| Edward Surridge | Chalfont St.Giles | 2 December 1925 | |
| Jock Paterson | Mid-Rhondda U | 11 January 1926 | £750 |
| Albert Chick | | 19 February 1926 | |
| Steve Munden | Clapton | 24 February 1926 | |
| Andy Kerr | Reading | 16 March 1926 | |
| Fred Hawley | Brighton | 10 May 1926 | |
| Harry Salt | Peterborough & Fletton U | 10 May 1926 | |
| Joe Wilcox | Bristol R | 10 May 1926 | Free |
| Jack Young | West Ham | 10 May 1926 | |
| Jimmy Lofthouse | Bristol R | 21 May 1926 | Free |
| George Charlesworth | Bristol R | 26 May 1926 | |
| George Goddard | Redhill | 26 May 1926 | |
| John Hamilton | Blackpool | 11 June 1926 | |
| Percy Varco | Aston Villa | 12 June 1926 | £800 |
| Joey Cunningham | Newport | 14 June 1926 | |
| Cecil Gough | Clapton Orient | 14 June 1926 | |
| Jock Collier | Hull | 29 June 1926 | Free |

== Transfers out ==
| Name | from | Date | Fee | Date | To | Fee |
|---|---|---|---|---|---|---|
| Ben Marsden | Port Vale | 14 May 1920 | | 25 July | Reading | |
| John Lillie | Liverpool | 2 June 1924 | | 25 July | Clapton Orient | |
| Jimmy Moore | Halifax | 25 May 1924 | | 25 July | Crewe | |
| Harrison Fenwick | Shildon | 12 May 1924 | | 25 Aug | Shildon | |
| Bill Ogley | Newport | 18 July 1924 | | 25 Aug | Castleford Town | |
| Harry Brown | Shildon | 12 May 1924 | | 25 Aug | Shildon | |
| Robert Bolam | South Shields | 30 May 1924 | | 25 Sep | Lewin's Temperance | |
| Harry Higginbotham | Reading | 25 October 1925 | | 25 Dec | Pontypridd | |
| Thomas Pierce | Ashington Y.M.C.A. | 14 September 1925 | | 26 Mar | Ashington Y.M.C.A. | |
| Herbert Etheridge | | 19 September 1925 | | 26 Mar | Horsham | |
| Steve Munden | Clapton | 24 February 1926 | | 26 Mar | Clapton | |
| Sid Smith | Guildford U | 24 October 1925 | | 26 May | Guildford U | |
| George Harris | Notts County | 16 May 1924 | Free | 26 May | Fulham | |
| John Thompson | Yeovil & Petters U | 20 May 1924 | | 26 May | Grays Thurrock U | Free |
| Charlie Campbell | Pembroke Dock | 6 May 1925 | | 26 May | Reading | |
| Joe Spottiswood | Swansea Town | 14 June 1925 | £400 | 26 May | Retired | |
| Joe Edwards | | 27 August 1925 | | 26 May | Grays Thurrock U | |
| Alf Rowe | Plymouth | 27 August 1925 | | 26 May | | |
| Andy Kerr | Reading | 16 March 1926 | | 26 May | | |
| Jim Kipping | Wycombe Wanderers | 8 May 1925 | | 26 June | Wycombe Wanderers | Free |
| Harry Hirst | Preston | 4 May 1925 | Free | 26 June | Charlton | |
| Bill Whitehead | Swansea Town | 15 October 1925 | | 26 June | Preston | £350 |
| Bill Field | Oxford City | 22 November 1922 | | cs 26 | Hinckley U | |
| Billy Barr | London Caledonians | 10 September 1925 | | cs 26 | London Caledonians | |
| Victor Avey | | 19 November 1924 | | cs 26 | Metropolitan Police | |
