= List of Queens Park Rangers F.C. records and statistics =

This article lists records and statistics relating to the English football club Queens Park Rangers.

== Team records ==
- Record Football League win: 9–2 v Tranmere Rovers, Football League Division Three (3 December 1960)
- Record Winning margin: 8-0 v Merthyr Tydfil, Football League Division Three South (9 March 1929)

Queen's Park Rangers 10 -0 Verona stars . Pre season 2015

== Player Records ==
Record appearances: Tony Ingham (548, 1950–1963)

Record goalscorer: George Goddard (172, 1926–1934)

Most international caps whilst at QPR: Alan McDonald (52 for Northern Ireland)

Most consecutive games played: Mike Keen 263 between December 1963 and September 1968.

== Other club records ==
=== Most played Football League clubs ===
This table lists the teams that QPR has met on most occasions in the English Football League / Premier League, and is correct as at 20 March 2017.

| Rank | Team | Games |
|---|---|---|
| 1 | Norwich City | 115 |
| 2 | Watford | 108 |
| 3 | Coventry City | 104 |

== Transfers ==
=== Highest transfer fees paid ===
| | Name | From | Fee | Date |
|---|---|---|---|---|
| 1 | (Republic of the Congo) Christopher Samba | (Russia) Anzhi Makhachkala | £12.5M | 2013 |
| 2 | (England) Steven Caulker | (Wales) Cardiff City | £8.5M | 2014 |
| 3 | (Netherlands) Leroy Fer | (England) Norwich City | £8M | 2014 |
| 4 | (France) Loïc Rémy | (France) Marseille | £8M | 2013 |
| 5 | (Brazil) Sandro | (England) Tottenham Hotspur | £6M | 2014 |
| 6 | (England) Jordon Mutch | (Wales) Cardiff City | £6M | 2014 |
| 7 | (Scotland) Matt Phillips | (England) Blackpool | £5M | 2013 |
| 8 | (Cameroon) Stéphane Mbia | (France) Marseille | £5M | 2012 |
| 9 | (Canada) Junior Hoilett | (England) Blackburn Rovers | £4M | 2012 |
| 10 | (England) Bobby Zamora | (England) Fulham | £4M | 2012 |

=== Highest transfer fees received ===
| | Name | To | Fee | Date |
|---|---|---|---|---|
| 1 | (England) Eberechi Eze | (England) Crystal Palace | £19.5M | 2020 |
| 2 | (Republic of the Congo) Christopher Samba | (Russia) Anzhi Makhachkala | £12M | 2013 |
| 3 | (France) Loïc Rémy | (England) Chelsea | £10.5M | 2014 |
| 4 | (England) Raheem Sterling | (England) Liverpool | £10.4M | 2010 |
| 5 | (England) Les Ferdinand | (England) Newcastle United | £6.0M | 1995 |
| 6 | (England) Jordan Mutch | (England) Crystal Palace | £4.75M | 2015 |
| 7 | (England) Charlie Austin | (England) Southampton | £4M | 2016 |
| 8 | (England) Alex McCarthy | (England) Crystal Palace | £3.5M | 2015 |
| 9 | (England) Andy Sinton | (England) Sheffield Wednesday | £2.75M | 1993 |
| 10 | (England) Darren Peacock | (England) Newcastle United | £2.7M | 1994 |
