= Harry Pitts (footballer) =

English footballer

Personal information
- Full name: Harold Frederick Pitts
- Date of birth: 29 April 1915
- Place of birth: Leyton, England
- Date of death: 1998 (aged 82–83)
- Height: 5 ft 7 in (1.70 m)
- Position: Full-back

Senior career*
Years	Team	Apps	(Gls)
1931–1932	Fulham	0	(0)
- Woking
- Islington Corinthians
1935–1939	Fulham	10	(0)
1939–1946	Chelmsford City		
- * Club domestic league appearances and goals

Harold Frederick Pitts (29 April 1915 – 1998) was an English footballer who played as a full-back.

== Career ==
In 1931, Pitts joined Fulham. After failing to establish himself in the first team, Pitts joined Working. In 1935, following a spell at Islington Corinthians, Pitts re-signed for Fulham, making 10 Football League appearances for the club over the course of four years. In 1939, Pitts signed for Chelmsford City, remaining with the club until the 1945–46 season.
