= Neil Franklin (footballer, born 1969) =

English footballer and coach

Personal information
- Full name: Neil John Franklin
- Date of birth: 10 March 1969 (age 57)
- Place of birth: Lincoln, England
- Height: 6 ft 0 in (1.83 m)
- Position: Defender

Youth career
- 1985–1987: Lincoln City

Senior career*
Years	Team	Apps	(Gls)
1986–1988	Lincoln City	19	(0)
1988	Nyköpings BIS		
1988	Lincoln City	1	(0)
1988	Gainsborough Trinity		
- Nyköpings BIS
- Kalmar FF
- Hargs BK
- * Club domestic league appearances and goals

Neil John Franklin (born 10 March 1969) is an English football coach and former player who played for Lincoln City. He coaches Hargs BK ladies.

== Playing career ==
Franklin made his Football League debut for Lincoln City in the 1–1 home draw with Rochdale on 18 October 1986 whilst in the second year of his youth training scheme. He would go on to make 15 league appearances for the club as they became the first team to be automatically relegated to the Football Conference at the end of the season. He played a further four times for the club in the following season but left before the end of their Football Conference championship win to join the Swedish side Nyköpings BIS. He returned to England at the end of the Swedish season and rejoined Lincoln City where he made a single further league appearance as a substitute for Trevor Matthewson in the club's 4–1 victory at Burnley on 8 November 1988 before moving to Gainsborough Trinity. He returned to Sweden, spending eight seasons with Nyköpings BIS before moving to Kalmar FF. In October 2001, he announced his retirement from playing following a season with Hargs BK.

== Coaching career ==
Franklin moved into coaching, helping Ferdinand Sipöcz coach Nyköpings BIS's youth team before, in November 2002, following Sipöcz to Tystberga GIF with Franklin taking the role of assistant coach. He would spend two years there before returning to coach the U19 team at Nyköpings BIS alongside Jonathan Hansson. He later coached both the men's and ladies teams at Hargs BK before, in October 2016, being appointed coach of IFK Nyköping's ladies team. After just one season however, he returned to coach Harg BK's ladies in October 2017.
