= Arthur Sales =

Arthur Sales may refer to:

- Arthur Sales (footballer, born 2002), Brazilian footballer
- Arthur Sales (footballer, born 1900) (1900–1977), English footballer
