= Leonard Thompson (footballer) =

English footballer

Personal information
- Full name: Leonard Thompson
- Date of birth: 18 February 1901
- Place of birth: Sheffield, Yorkshire, England
- Date of death: 26 August 1968 (aged 67)
- Height: 5 ft 7 1/2 in (1.71 m)
- Position: Inside left

Youth career
- Shiregreen Primitive Methodists
- Hallam

Senior career*
Years	Team	Apps	(Gls)
1917–1918	Barnsley	2	(0)
1918–1922	Birmingham	3	(0)
1922–1927	Swansea Town	188	(89)
1927–1933	Arsenal	26	(6)
1933–1934	Crystal Palace	2	(0)
- Islington Corinthians
- * Club domestic league appearances and goals

Leonard Thompson (18 February 1901 – 26 August 1968) was an English professional footballer. He was born in Sheffield as the next to youngest child of Arthur William Thompson and Annie Willy. Too young to go to war, Thompson was encouraged to play for Sheffield school.

== Playing career ==
Thompson first joined Barnsley in 1917 as a 16-year-old amateur, he was on a trial and he managed to play in the afternoon match after the inside left was unable to; he scored a hat trick. He turned professional upon moving to Birmingham in 1918, a move he regretted later, as Manchester United and Liverpool were both looking to sign him. After this brief spell he moved to Swansea Town in 1922. In six seasons with Swansea he played nearly 200 league games scoring almost 100 goals as an inside forward, asgot part of the so-called "great little team" (being lower than average height), winning a Third Division South winners' medal in 1924–25, scoring the final goal to take them into the second division.

In Swansea's first season in the Second Division, his 19 goals helped Swansea finish in fifth place in the league. He also featured prominently in Swansea's 1925–26 FA Cup run in which they reached the semi-final, where they were beaten 3–0 by the eventual winners, Bolton Wanderers. During the cup run, Thompson scored four goals, including the opening goal against Arsenal in a 2–1 victory in round 6 (quarter finals).

The following season, Thompson was the club's leading goalscorer with 26 league and four cup goals, including a hat-trick on 8 January 1927 in a 4–1 FA Cup victory against Bury.

On 17 March 1928, he was signed by Arsenal for £4,000 but his career at Arsenal was plagued by a knee injury. He made his debut in a 2–0 defeat by Portsmouth on 28 March 1928 and at first shared the inside left position with Harold Peel, playing 17 times in 1928–29, scoring five goals as the side's penalty expert. With his injury restricting him, despite many operations, he only made nine more appearances in four seasons for Arsenal, and spent most of his time there regularly coaching the reserve team. Under him they were the London Combination Champions from 1928 to 1931, and they won the London FA Challenge Cup in 1930–1. After not making any appearances at all in 1932–33 he left Arsenal for Crystal Palace, having made 27 appearances and having scored six goals in total. He retired from professional football the following season.

After Thompson retired, he briefly reinstated as an amateur at Islington Corinthians then later coached Tottenham Hotspur's reserve team and had a spell as a scout with Arsenal. Between 1947 and 1956 he was Arsenal's so called 'man in black' who watched the team Arsenal was to play the next week. He featured in advertisements for Sandeman's Port but no one ever discovered his identity, even when the Daily Express got a picture of him. On 26 August 1968, Len Thompson died of a heart attack aged 67.

== Honours ==
Swansea Town

- Third Division South winners: 1926–27
