= Jumma Khan Jr. =

British Indian footballer

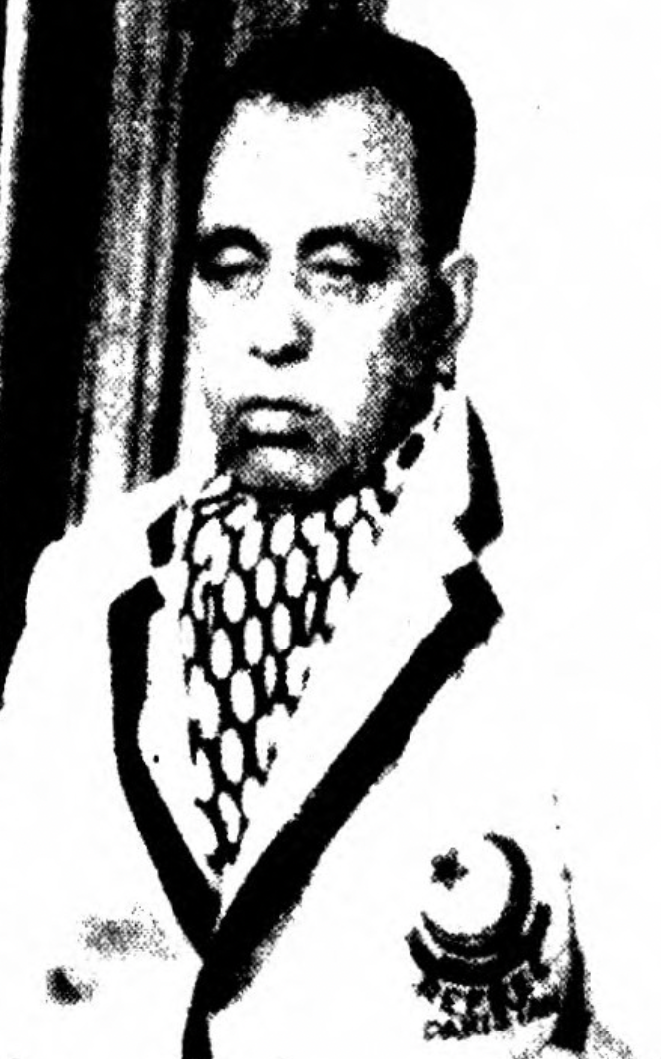
- Jumma Khan in the 1960s

Personal information
- Date of birth: 1911
- Place of birth: Quetta, British India
- Date of death: 12 April 1991 (aged 79–80)
- Place of death: Unknown
- Position: Defender

Senior career*
Years	Team	Apps	(Gls)
1927–1938	Muslim Club Quetta		
1939–1942	Mohammedan SC		

International career
1939	IFA XI		
- * Club domestic league appearances and goals

Jumma Khan Jr., also known by his nickname Friday, was a Pakistani footballer and later football referee, he played during the late 1930s and early 1940s. He was associated with Mohammedan Sporting.

== Club career ==
In 1927, Khan started playing for his local club Muslim Club of Quetta. He then joined Mohammedan SC in 1939, where he featured in prominent tournaments such as the Durand Cup and the IFA Shield.

In 1937, Khan was also selected to play for the N.W.I.F.A team to play against the visiting side Islington Corinthians.

In 1942, Khan toured and played his retirement match at Aligarh with Mohammedan SC, to play a match against the Aligarh University. Khan managed to impress the then vice-chancellor of Aligarh Muslim University, Ziauddin Ahmad.

== International career ==
In 1939, Khan alongside fellow player Fakhru Hassan were selected to represent an IFA XI, where the team played several exhibition matches.

== Refereeing career ==
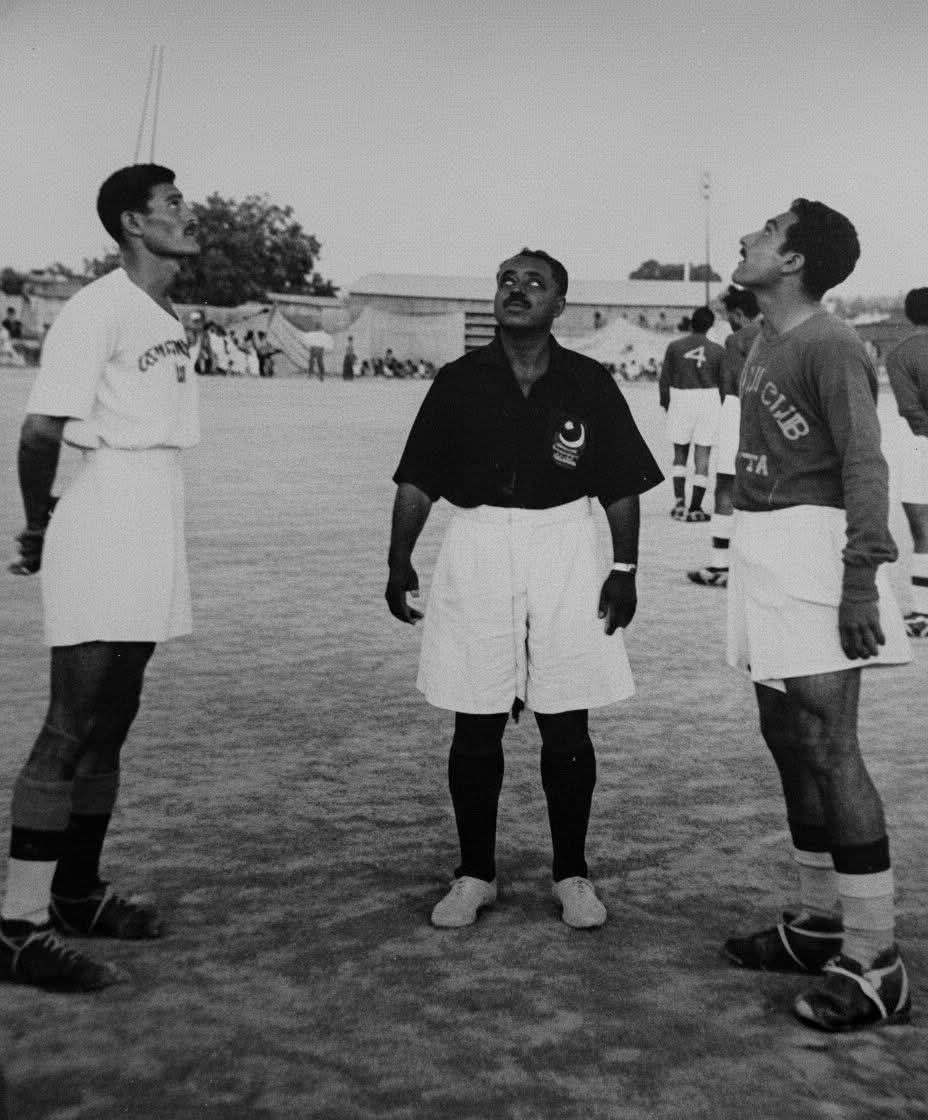
Khan (in the middle), performing a coin toss before officiating a match.

Following his retirement from active football, Jumma Khan Jr. became a football referee, officiating matches, including matches connected with the Pakistan Football Federation and supervised matches in Quetta.

== Personal life ==
Khan and his wife had 3 children, two sons and a daughter. He also owned a carpet business in Quetta, which was demolished during the 1935 Quetta earthquake. Due to his low income and revenue, Khan received financial aid from time to time by fellow government officers, Muhammad Musa, Khawaja Nazimuddin, and A. K. Fazlul Huq.

== Death ==
Khan died on 12 April 1991.
