= Noah Burton =

English footballer

Personal information
- Full name: Noah Burton
- Date of birth: 18 December 1896
- Place of birth: Old Basford, England
- Date of death: 1956 (aged 59–60)
- Position: Inside forward

Senior career*
Years	Team	Apps	(Gls)
1914–1915	Bulwell St Alban's		
1915	Ilkeston United		
1919–1921	Derby County	56	(16)
1921–1932	Nottingham Forest	296	(57)
1932	Nottingham East End		
Total		352	(73)
- * Club domestic league appearances and goals

Noah Burton (18 December 1896 – 1956) was an English footballer who played in the Football League for Derby County and Nottingham Forest.
