= Trevor Matthewson =

English footballer

Personal information
- Full name: Trevor Matthewson
- Date of birth: 12 February 1963 (age 63)
- Place of birth: Sheffield, England
- Height: 6 ft 4 in (1.93 m)
- Position: Centre half

Youth career
- 1979–1980: Sheffield Wednesday

Senior career*
Years	Team	Apps	(Gls)
1980–1983	Sheffield Wednesday	3	(0)
1983–1985	Newport County	75	(0)
1985–1987	Stockport County	80	(0)
1987–1989	Lincoln City	83	(8)
1989–1993	Birmingham City	168	(12)
1993–1994	Preston North End	12	(1)
1994–1996	Bury	34	(0)
1996–1997	Witton Albion		
1996–1998	Hereford United	62	(4)
1998	Ilkeston Town		
1999	Gresley Rovers	1	(0)
- * Club domestic league appearances and goals

Trevor Matthewson (born 12 February 1963) is an English former professional footballer who played as a centre half. He played more than 500 senior games, including over 200 for Birmingham City.

== Biography ==
Trevor Matthewson was born in Sheffield into a footballing family: both his grandfather (Tommy Matthewson for Sheffield Wednesday and South Shields) and uncle (Reg Matthewson) had played professionally. He began his football career as an apprentice with home-town club Sheffield Wednesday, but failed to make the grade. After two seasons as a professional he dropped down a division to join Newport County and two years later he dropped another division to Stockport County. After a further two years he left the Football League entirely and signed for Lincoln City in the Conference. As captain he led them to the Conference championship and promotion to the Football League in 1988.

A year later he moved to Birmingham City for a fee determined by tribunal of £45,000. In his first season, 1989–90, he became the first Birmingham player to appear in every match of a 46-game League season, a feat he repeated the following year. He made more than 200 appearances for Birmingham, played in the final of the Associate Members' Cup in 1991, and helped them gain promotion to the newly designated First Division the following season.

After leaving Birmingham he had spells at Preston North End, Bury, Hereford United, Ilkeston Town and Gresley Rovers. After retiring from football, Matthewson returned to his home town of Sheffield, running first a shop and then a market stall trading in fish and meat.

== Honours ==
Lincoln City

- Football Conference: 1987–88

Birmingham City

- Associate Members' Cup: 1990–91
- Football League Third Division promotion: 1991–92
