= Dick Burgess =

English footballer

Personal information
- Full name: Daniel Burgess
- Date of birth: 23 October 1896
- Place of birth: Goldenhill, England
- Date of death: 1983 (aged 86–87)
- Height: 5 ft 7 1/2 in (1.71 m)
- Position: Inside forward

Youth career
- Goldenhill Wanderers

Senior career*
Years	Team	Apps	(Gls)
1919–1920	Port Vale	0	(0)
1920–1922	Arsenal	13	(1)
1922–1923	West Ham United	2	(0)
1923–1925	Aberdare Athletic	77	(24)
1925–1927	Queens Park Rangers	46	(9)
1927–1928	Sittingbourne		
1928–1929	Dartford		
1929–19??	Sheppey United		
Total		138	(34)
- * Club domestic league appearances and goals

Daniel Burgess (23 October 1896 – 1983) was an English professional footballer who played as an inside forward.

== Career ==
Burgess played for local side Goldenhill Wanderers before joining Port Vale in December 1918 after leaving the army. He scored on his debut at inside-right in a 3–1 victory over Manchester United in a Football League Lancashire Section match at the Old Recreation Ground on 14 December 1918. He scored a total of four goals in seven games for the "Valeites" before moving on to Arsenal in February 1919. He spent three seasons at Highbury, scoring one goal from 13 First Division games. He spent the 1922–23 season with West Ham United but featured in just two Second Division matches. He finally found regular first-team football at Aberdare Athletic, scoring 24 goals in 77 Third Division South across the 1923–24 and 1924–25 campaigns. He returned to London to play for Queens Park Rangers, scoring 8 eight goals in 32 Third Division South fixtures across the 1925–26 campaign. However, he fell out of favour at Loftus Road during the 1926–27 season. He left the Football League, spending the remainder of the decade in non-League circles at Sittingbourne, Dartford and Sheppey United.

== Career statistics ==
Appearances and goals by club, season and competition
Club	Season	League			FA Cup		Total	
Club	Season	Division	Apps	Goals	Apps	Goals	Apps	Goals
Arsenal	1919–20	First Division	7	1	0	0	7	1
Arsenal	1920–21	First Division	4	0	0	0	4	0
Arsenal	1921–22	First Division	2	0	0	0	2	0
Arsenal	Total		13	1	0	0	13	1
West Ham United	1922–23	Second Division	2	0	0	0	2	0
Aberdare Athletic	1923–24	Third Division South	42	14	5	2	47	16
Aberdare Athletic	1924–25	Third Division South	35	10	1	0	36	10
Aberdare Athletic	Total		77	24	6	2	83	26
Queens Park Rangers	1925–26	Third Division South	32	8	4	0	36	8
Queens Park Rangers	1926–27	Third Division South	14	1	0	0	14	1
Queens Park Rangers	Total		46	9	4	0	50	9
Career total			138	34	10	2	148	36
