= Jack Curran (footballer) =

Irish footballer

Personal information
- Full name: John Joseph Curran
- Date of birth: 1898
- Place of birth: Belfast, Ireland
- Height: 5 ft 8 in (1.73 m)
- Position: Full back

Youth career
- Queens Park (Lurgan)

Senior career*
Years	Team	Apps	(Gls)
19??–1920	Lurgan Rangers		
1920–1922	Glenavon		
1922–1923	Pontypridd		
1923–1925	Glenavon		
1925–1930	Brighton & Hove Albion	180	(0)
1930–1932	Linfield		

International career
1922–1923	Ireland	5	(0)
- * Club domestic league appearances and goals

John Joseph Curran (1898 – after 1932) was an Irish professional footballer who made 180 Football League appearances playing as a full back for Brighton & Hove Albion. He won domestic and representative honours in both Ireland and Wales, and was capped five times for Ireland.

== Life and career ==
Curran was born in 1898 in Belfast. He joined Glenavon in 1920, helping the club reach two successive Irish Cup finals and runner-up spot in the 1920–21 Irish League. His performances were rewarded first with selection for the Irish League representative team to play the Football League XI in October 1921 and then with a first cap for Ireland, in a 1–1 draw at home to Wales in the 1921–22 British Home Championship. He spent the 1922–23 season with Pontypridd of the Southern League Welsh Section, during which he was capped twice more for his country and played twice for the Welsh League representative team. Returning to Glenavon, he made his last appearance for Ireland in a 2–1 defeat of England at Windsor Park in October 1923

Curran signed for Brighton & Hove Albion of the Football League Third Division South in 1925, where he established a full-back partnership with Jack Jenkins that lasted several years. In December 1930, Curran – who had been ever-present the previous season and had made nearly 200 senior appearances in total – and prolific goalscorer Hugh Vallance suddenly left the club after a "serious misdemeanour". Curran returned to Ireland and joined Linfield, with whom he won the 1930–31 Irish Cup and 1931–32 Irish League.
