= Percy Barratt =

English footballer

Personal information
- Full name: Percy Marriott Barratt
- Date of birth: 6 October 1898
- Place of birth: Annesley, England
- Date of death: 1974 (aged 75–76)
- Position: Full-back

Senior career*
Years	Team	Apps	(Gls)
1914–1915	Annesley St Alban's		
1919–1930	Nottingham Forest	217	(17)
1930	Grantham		
Total		217	(17)
- * Club domestic league appearances and goals

Percy Barratt (6 October 1898 – 1974) was an English footballer who played in the Football League for Nottingham Forest.
