= Peter Bell (footballer, born 1898) =

English footballer

Personal information
- Full name: Peter Bell
- Date of birth: 8 October 1898
- Place of birth: Felling, Tyne and Wear, England
- Date of death: 1965 (aged 66–67)
- Position: Winger

Senior career*
Years	Team	Apps	(Gls)
1913–1914	Willington Athletic		
1914–1915	Durham City		
1919	Willington Athletic		
1919–1922	Oldham Athletic	18	(2)
1922–1923	Darlington	16	(4)
1923–1926	Raith Rovers		
1926–1928	Manchester City	42	(7)
1928–1929	Falkirk		
1929–1930	Burton Town		
1930–1931	Darlington	11	(1)
Total		87	(14)
- * Club domestic league appearances and goals

Peter Bell (8 October 1898 – 1965) was an English footballer who played in the Football League for Darlington, Manchester City and Oldham Athletic.
