= Billy Corkindale =

English footballer (1901–1972)

Personal information
- Full name: William Joseph Corkindale
- Date of birth: 19 May 1901
- Place of birth: Langley Green, England
- Date of death: 1979 (aged 83–84)
- Position: Winger

Senior career*
Years	Team	Apps	(Gls)
1922–1923	Wellington Town		
1923–1926	Swansea Town	18	(2)
1926–1929	Clapton Orient	96	(17)
1929–1931	Millwall	40	(4)
1932–1933	Luton Town	1	(0)
1933	Shrewsbury Town		
Total		155	(23)
- * Club domestic league appearances and goals

William Joseph Corkindale (19 May 1901 – 1972) was an English footballer who played in the Football League for Clapton Orient, Luton Town, Millwall and Swansea Town.
