= Jimmy Curran (footballer) =

English footballer (1902–1979)

Personal information
- Full name: James Curran
- Date of birth: 2 August 1902
- Place of birth: Ryton-on-Tyne, England
- Date of death: 1979 (aged 83–84)
- Position: Winger

Senior career*
Years	Team	Apps	(Gls)
1919–1920	Crawcrook Albion		
1920–1921	Spen Black & White		
1921–1932	Barnsley	244	(71)
1932–1933	Southend United	2	(1)
Total		246	(72)
- * Club domestic league appearances and goals

James Curran (2 August 1902 – 1979) was an English footballer who played in the Football League for Barnsley and Southend United.
