= Andy Neil (footballer) =

Scottish footballer

Personal information
- Full name: Andrew Neil
- Date of birth: 18 November 1892
- Place of birth: Crosshouse, Scotland
- Date of death: 14 August 1941 (aged 48)
- Place of death: Kilmarnock, Scotland
- Height: 5 ft 8 in (1.73 m)
- Positions: Inside forward; wing half

Senior career*
Years	Team	Apps	(Gls)
19??–1912	Ardeer Thistle		
1912–1919	Kilmarnock	75	(32)
1912–1913	→ Galston (loan)		
1916	→ Galston (loan)		
1916–1917	→ Stevenston United (loan)		
1919–1920	Stevenston United		
1920–1924	Brighton & Hove Albion	129	(22)
1924–1926	Arsenal	54	(10)
1926–1927	Brighton & Hove Albion	38	(6)
1927–1930	Queens Park Rangers	106	(1)
- * Club domestic league appearances and goals

Andrew Neil (18 November 1892 – 14 August 1941) was a Scottish professional footballer who made 75 appearances in Division One for Kilmarnock and 327 appearances in the English Football League for Brighton & Hove Albion (two spells), Arsenal and Queens Park Rangers. He played as an inside forward or wing half.

== Life and career ==
Neil was born in Crosshouse, near Kilmarnock in Ayrshire. He joined Kilmarnock of Division One from junior club Ardeer Thistle, and made his debut on 12 April 1913 away to Motherwell. He played regularly in his second season, and in 1914–15, his 20 goals placed him sixth in the division's scoring charts.

Neil came south in 1920 to sign for Brighton & Hove Albion of the newly formed Football League Third Division. He was a regular at inside right, technically skilful and creative, and impressed to the extent that First Division club Arsenal paid a £3,000 fee – an Albion club record – for his services in March 1924. He was never a regular at Arsenal, but despite a lack of pace, was brought into the team at the insistence of captain Charlie Buchan to play a roving inside-forward role in front of a purely defensive centre half; the tactical change contributed to a runners-up finish in 1925–26. Although he had played 27 matches that season, Neil returned to Brighton in March 1926. He stayed until the 1927 close season, and then moved on to another third-tier club, Queens Park Rangers, where he played as a wing half until retiring in 1930 at the age of 37.

He then went back to Scotland and his original trade, as a baker. He died of a heart attack in Kilmarnock in 1941.

== Career statistics ==
Appearances and goals by club, season and competition
Club	Season	League			National Cup (Note: Includes Scottish Cup, FA Cup)		Total	
Club	Season	Division	Apps	Goals	Apps	Goals	Apps	Goals
Kilmarnock	1912–13	Division One	2	0	0	0	2	0
Kilmarnock	1913–14	Division One	32	12	2	1	34	13
Kilmarnock	1914–15	Division One	33	20	—		33	20
Kilmarnock	1915–16	Division One	5	0	—		5	0
Kilmarnock	1918–19	Division One	3	0	—		3	0
Kilmarnock	Total		75	32	2	1	77	33
Brighton & Hove Albion	1920–21	Third Division	18	2	3	0	21	2
Brighton & Hove Albion	1921–22	Third Division South	40	3	3	0	43	3
Brighton & Hove Albion	1922–23	Third Division South	42	10	5	1	47	11
Brighton & Hove Albion	1923–24	Third Division South	29	7	4	1	33	8
Brighton & Hove Albion	Total		129	22	15	2	144	24
Arsenal	1923–24	First Division	11	2	0	0	11	2
Arsenal	1924–25	First Division	16	2	0	0	16	2
Arsenal	1925–25	First Division	27	6	3	0	30	6
Arsenal	Total		54	10	3	0	57	10
Brighton & Hove Albion	1925–26	Third Division South	12	2	0	0	12	2
Brighton & Hove Albion	1926–27	Third Division South	26	4	3	0	29	4
Brighton & Hove Albion	Total		38	6	3	0	41	6
Queens Park Rangers	1927–28	Third Division South	41	1	1	0	42	1
Queens Park Rangers	1928–29	Third Division South	29	0	1	0	30	0
Queens Park Rangers	1929–30	Third Division South	36	0	4	0	40	0
Queens Park Rangers	Total		106	1	6	0	112	1
Career total			402	71	29	3	431	74
