= Tommy Wyper =

Scottish footballer

Personal information
- Full name: Henry Thomas Hartley Wyper
- Date of birth: 8 October 1900
- Place of birth: Calton, Glasgow, Scotland
- Date of death: 1974 (aged 73–74)
- Position: Winger

Senior career*
Years	Team	Apps	(Gls)
1920–1921	Glengarnock Vale		
1921–1922	Southport	7	(0)
1922	Motherwell		
1922–1923	Southport	2	(0)
1923	Burnley	0	(0)
1923–1924	Wallasey United		
1924–1925	Burscough Rangers		
1925–1927	Accrington Stanley	61	(14)
1927–1928	Hull City	40	(2)
1928	Arsenal	0	(0)
1928–1931	Charlton Athletic	82	(12)
1931–1932	Queens Park Rangers	11	(0)
1932–1933	Chester	24	(7)
1933	Bristol Rovers	11	(2)
1933–1934	Accrington Stanley	29	(7)
1934	Macclesfield		
1934–1935	Crewe Alexandra	0	(0)
1935	Rossendale United		
Total		267	(44)
- * Club domestic league appearances and goals

Henry Thomas Hartley Wyper (8 October 1900 – 1974) was a Scottish footballer who played in the Football League for Accrington Stanley, Bristol Rovers, Charlton Athletic, Chester, Hull City, Queens Park Rangers and Southport.
