= Tommy Matthewson =

English footballer

Personal information
- Full name: Thomas James Matthewson
- Date of birth: 9 May 1903
- Place of birth: Gateshead, England
- Date of death: 1979 (aged 83–84)
- Position: Winger

Senior career*
Years	Team	Apps	(Gls)
1919–1920	Gateshead Town		
1920–1921	Close Works		
1921–1922	Sheffield Wednesday	1	(0)
1923–1930	South Shields	221	(44)
1930–1933	North Shields		
1933–1934	Pelaw Athletic		
1934–1938	Dunston CWS		
1938	Daniel Doncaster & Sons		
Total		222	(44)
- * Club domestic league appearances and goals

Thomas James Matthewson (9 May 1903 – 1979) was an English footballer who played in the Football League for Sheffield Wednesday and South Shields.
