= Chris Ferguson (footballer) =

Scottish footballer (1907–1981)

Personal information
- Full name: Christopher Ferguson
- Date of birth: 16 July 1907
- Place of birth: Lesmahagow, Lanarkshire, Scotland
- Date of death: 11 June 1981 (aged 73)
- Position: Inside forward

Senior career*
Years	Team	Apps	(Gls)
1927–1930	Chelsea	1	(0)
1930–1931	Queens Park Rangers	15	(1)
1931–1932	Wrexham	18	(4)
- Guildford City
- * Club domestic league appearances and goals

Christopher Ferguson (16 July 1907 – 11 June 1981) was a Scottish professional footballer who played as an inside forward. He made appearances in the English Football League for Chelsea, Queens Park Rangers and Wrexham.
