= Billy McAllister =

Australian boxer

"Young" Billy McAllister
Personal information
- Nickname: Young
- Nationality: Australian
- Born: 12 February 1907 Melbourne, Australia
- Died: 30 April 1984 (aged 77)
- Weight: fly/bantam/featherweight

Boxing career
- Stance: Orthodox

Boxing record
- Total fights: 136
- Wins: 86 (KO 16)
- Losses: 38 (KO 13)
- Draws: 11
- No contests: 1

"Young" Billy McAllister (12 February 1907 – 30 April 1984) born in Melbourne, was an Australian professional fly/bantam/featherweight boxer of the 1920s and 1930s who won the Australian flyweight title, Australian bantamweight title, and British Empire bantamweight title, his professional fighting weight varied from 92 lb (42 kg; 6 st 8 lb), i.e. flyweight to 126 lb (57 kg; 9 st 0 lb), i.e. featherweight.
