= Jack Blackman (English footballer) =

English footballer

Personal information
- Full name: John James Blackman
- Date of birth: 25 November 1911
- Place of birth: Bermondsey, England
- Date of death: December 1987 (aged 76)
- Place of death: Croydon, England
- Height: 5 ft 9 in (1.75 m)
- Position: Forward

Youth career
- Weston United

Senior career*
Years	Team	Apps	(Gls)
1931–1935	Queens Park Rangers	108	(62)
1935–1946	Crystal Palace	99	(52)
1946–1947	Guildford City		
- * Club domestic league appearances and goals

John James Blackman (25 November 1911 – December 1987) was an English professional footballer who played in the Football League for Crystal Palace and Queens Park Rangers as a forward. He also played non-league football for Guildford City.

== Playing career ==
Blackman began his senior career at Queens Park Rangers and in October 1935, signed for Crystal Palace, then playing in the Football League Third Division South. He made a goal-scoring debut in November in a home 5–0 win against Millwall and went on to make 27 appearances that season scoring 19 times. Blackman made 29 appearances in each of the next two seasons scoring 12 and 16 goals respectively and 14 appearances (5 goals) in 1938–9. Regular league football was then suspended due to World War II but Blackman went on to play Wartime League football for Palace up until 1946. In May 1946, Blackman moved on to Guildford City and remained with the club for one season. After retiring from football, he served as a trainer and physiotherapist at Millwall in the 1960s.

== Personal life ==
Blackman died in 1987, aged 76.
