= Albert Legge =

English footballer (1903–1998)

Personal information
- Full name: Albert Edward Legge
- Date of birth: 8 February 1903
- Place of birth: Wednesfield, England
- Date of death: 1998 (aged 94–95)
- Position: Centre forward

Senior career*
Years	Team	Apps	(Gls)
1921–1923	Lewisham Athletic		
1923–1928	Wolverhampton Wanderers	53	(5)
1928–1929	Gillingham	31	(5)
1929–1930	Charlton Athletic	10	(2)
1930–1931	Queens Park Rangers	9	(0)
1931–1932	Wellington Town		
1932–1934	Cradley Heath		
1934	Hednesford Town		
Total		103	(12)
- * Club domestic league appearances and goals

Albert Edward Legge (8 February 1903 – 1998) was an English footballer who played in the Football League for Charlton Athletic, Gillingham, Queens Park Rangers and Wolverhampton Wanderers.
