= Tommy Cable =

English footballer and manager

Personal information
- Full name: Thomas Henry Cable
- Date of birth: 27 November 1900
- Place of birth: Barking, England
- Date of death: 1986 (aged 85–86)
- Position: Centre half

Senior career*
Years	Team	Apps	(Gls)
	Barking	?	(?)
	Leyton	?	(?)
1925–1926	Queens Park Rangers	18	(2)
	Middlesex Wanderers	?	(?)
	Leyton.	?	(?)
1928–1931	Tottenham Hotspur	42	(0)
1932	Southampton	0	(0)
1932	Kettering		

Managerial career
- 1950–51: Grays Athletic
- * Club domestic league appearances and goals

Thomas Henry Cable (27 November 1900 – 1986) was a professional footballer who played for Barking, Leyton, Queens Park Rangers, Middlesex Wanderers, Tottenham Hotspur and Kettering Town.

== Football career ==
Cable began his career at his local club Barking before joining Leyton. In 1925 he signed for Queens Park Rangers where he appeared in 18 matches, scoring twice. After playing for Middlesex Rangers the centre half re-joined Leyton. Cable was signed by Tottenham Hotspur in 1928 and went on to feature in 44 matches for the Lilywhites between 1928 and 1932. He joined Southampton in 1932 but did not make a first team appearance. Cable ended his playing career at Kettering Town.
