= Percy Varco =

English footballer

Personal information
- Date of birth: 17 April 1902
- Place of birth: Fowey, England
- Date of death: 29 January 1982 (aged 79)
- Position: Forward

Senior career*
| Years | Team | Apps | (Gls) |
- Fowey Town
| –1924 | Torquay United | | |
| 1924–1926 | Aston Villa | 10 | (2) |
| 1926–1927 | Queens Park Rangers | 16 | (4) |
| 1927–1929 | Norwich City | 65 | (47) |
| 1929–1932 | Exeter City | 81 | (41) |
| 1932 | Brighton & Hove Albion | 1 | (0) |
- St Austell
- St Blazey
- * Club domestic league appearances and goals

Percy Varco (17 April 1904 – 29 January 1982) was an English professional football centre-forward.

Varco was born in Fowey, Cornwall and played for his local side Fowey Town before moving to Southern League Torquay United. He left Plainmoor in 1924 to join Aston Villa for a fee of £200, scoring twice in 10 league games for the West Midlands side. He subsequently moved to Queens Park Rangers (4 goals in 16 league games), before joining Norwich City in 1927. He quickly became a hero at The Nest, scoring 32 times in his first season, including 10 goals in his first 7 league games. In 1929, after 37 goals in just 57 league games for Norwich (and 47 in 65 overall), he moved to Exeter City and continued to be a prolific goalscorer, netting 41 goals in 81 league games. He moved to Brighton and Hove Albion in 1932, but played just once for the Seagulls before returning to Cornwall where he played for non-league sides St Austell and St Blazey.

In later life he spent two spells as Mayor of Fowey. Varco was known as a "brilliant conversationalist".
