= Alf Vango =

English footballer

Personal information
- Full name: Alfred James Vango
- Date of birth: 23 December 1900
- Place of birth: Walthamstow, England
- Date of death: 24 November 1977

Senior career*
Years	Team	Apps	(Gls)
–1923	Gnome Athletic		
1923-1929	Gillingham	5	
1929-1931	Walthamstow		
1931	Queens Park Rangers	12	
1932	Clapton Orient		
- * Club domestic league appearances and goals

Alfred James Vango (23 December 1900 – 24 November 1977) was an English professional footballer of the 1920s. Born in Walthamstow, he joined Gillingham from Walthamstow-based Gnome Athletic in 1923 and went on to make five appearances for the club in The Football League. He left to return to his native area and joined Walthamstow Avenue in 1929.
