= Michael Gilhooley =

Scottish footballer

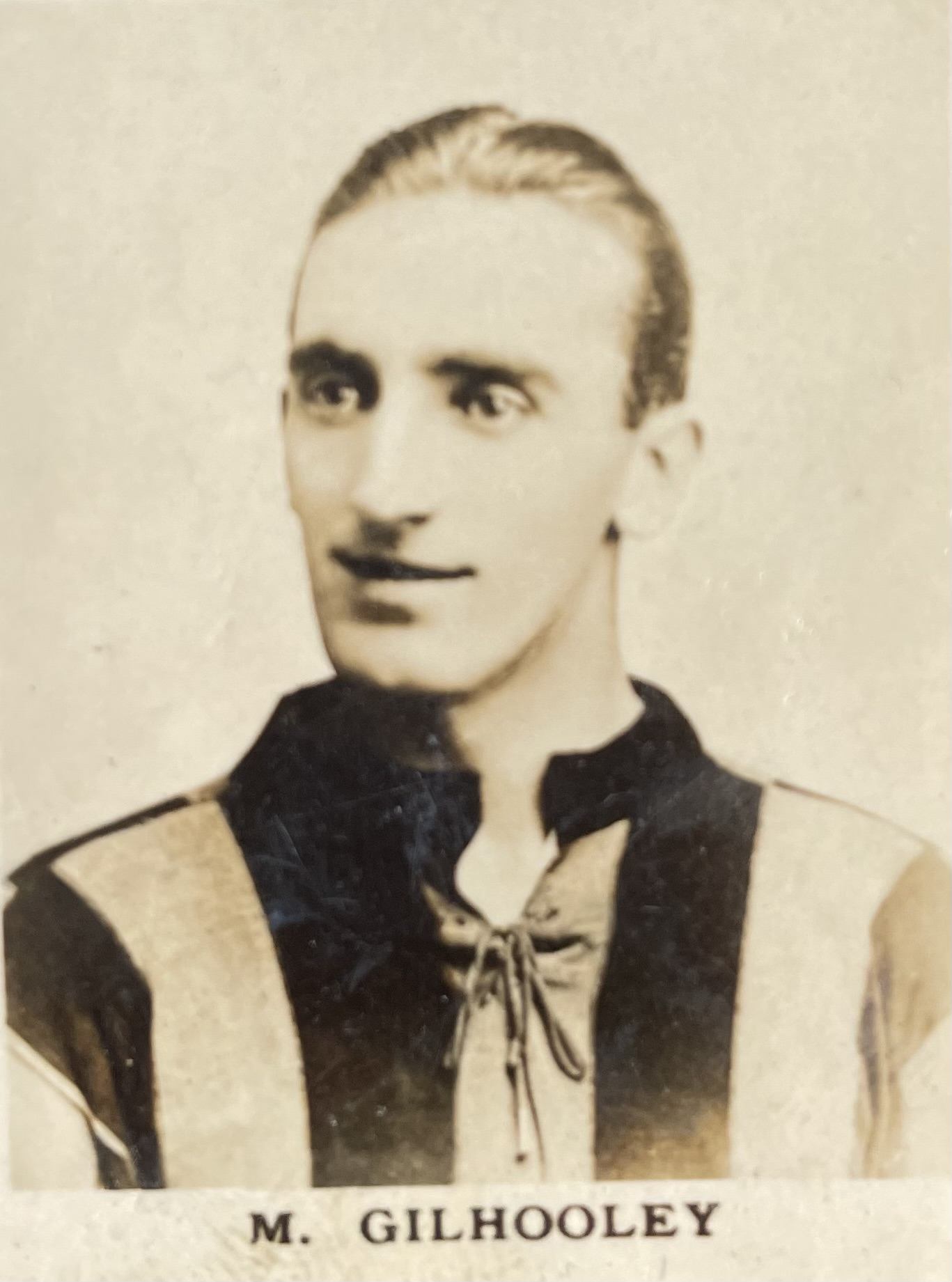

Personal information
- Date of birth: 26 November 1894
- Place of birth: Edinburgh, Scotland
- Date of death: 17 May 1969 (aged 74)
- Place of death: Troon, Scotland
- Position: Centre half

Youth career
- Glencraig Celtic

Senior career*
Years	Team	Apps	(Gls)
1913–1914	Celtic	0	(0)
1913–1914	→ Abercorn (loan)	9	(0)
1914–1918	Vale of Leven	15	(0)
1918–1920	Clydebank	57	(2)
1920–1922	Hull City	67	(0)
1922–1925	Sunderland	19	(0)
1925–1927	Bradford City	52	(0)
1927–1928	Queen's Park Rangers	9	(0)
- Troon Athletic
Total		228	(2)

International career
1922	Scotland	1	(0)
- * Club domestic league appearances and goals

Michael Gilhooley (26 November 1894 – 17 May 1969) was a Scottish professional footballer who played as a centre-half. He represented Scotland once at international level.

== Career ==
Born in Edinburgh but with much of his early life spent in Fife, Gilhooley played junior football for Glencraig Celtic, then played for Celtic, Abercorn, Vale of Leven, Clydebank, Hull City, Sunderland, Bradford City and Queens Park Rangers, before returning to junior football with Troon Athletic.

At Hull he made 67 league and 5 FA Cup appearances. At Sunderland he made 19 league appearances, having suffered a broken leg soon after joining the club.

He signed for Bradford City in May 1925, and left the club in May 1927. He made 52 appearances in the Football League for them, as well as 1 FA Cup appearance. He then moved to London with QPR, making 9 league appearances in his single season at Loftus Road.

Gilhooley earned one international cap for Scotland in 1922.
