= Islington Corinthians F.C. =

Islington Corinthians
- Founded: 1932
- Dissolved: c. 1940

The Islington Corinthians Football Club is a defunct English association football club.

== History ==
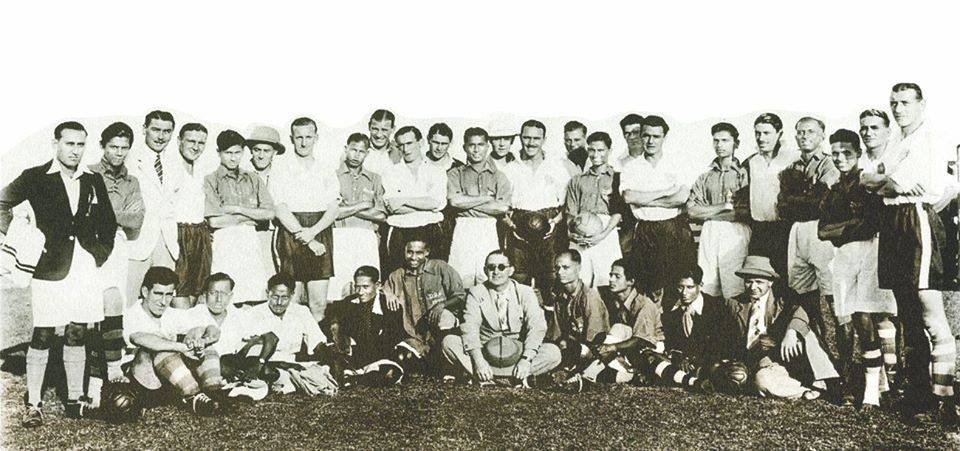
Islington Corinthians and Dhaka XI team photo in 1937

Islington Corinthians was founded in 1932 by Tom Smith, to raise money for local charities. The club was part of the London Professional Mid Week League, where they competed against the reserve teams of clubs such as Arsenal, Chelsea and Fulham.

In 1936 the Corinthians were selected to play against the Chinese Olympic team in a friendly at Highbury. This became the catalyst for a world tour. The tour spanned the 1937–38 football season, taking the club to the Netherlands, Switzerland, Egypt, India, Burma, Malaya, Singapore, Vietnam, the Philippines, China, Japan, Hawaii, the United States and Canada.

The club was attacked by the British Army in the Khyber Pass, accompanied the Hong Kong police on opium den raids and visited Hollywood film sets, meeting stars such as David Niven. The club played 95 games on their travels. However, the club did not survive World War II; disappearing after 1940 when plans for a South American tour were cancelled.

== Notable players ==
- L.T. Huddle (Casuals)
- Bernard Joy (Arsenal, Corinthians, Casuals)
- Harry Lowe (Tottenham)
- Sonny Avery (Leyton)
- Leonard Bradbury (Moor Green)
- Jack Braithwaite (Barnet)
- Alec Buchanan (Barnet)
- Pat Clark (Leyton, Sutton United)
- George Dance (Moor Green)
- Cyril Longman (Kingstonian)
- Richard Manning (Clacton Town)
- Albert (Eddie) Martin (Tunbridge Wells Rangers, FC Antibes)
- John Miller (Tufnell Park, Dulwich Hamlet, Margate)
- William Miller (Dulwich Hamlet)
- George Pearce (Hoxton Manor)
- Bert Read (Nunhead)
- Johnny Sherwood (Reading, Maidenhead United, Crystal Palace, Aldershot)
- Dick Tarrant (Sutton United)
- Bill Whittaker (Kingstonian)
- Ted Wingfield (Romford)
- J.K. Wright (Yorkshire Amateurs, Wimbledon, Dulwich Hamlet)

== Sources ==
- Rob Cavallini (2008). Around The World In 95 Games – The amazing story of Islington Corinthians 1937/38 world tour. ISBN 978-0-9550496-1-3.
- Islington Corinthians Article
- Green, Pete. "When Saturday Comes - Around The World In 95 Games". www.wsc.co.uk.
- Cooper, Ian. "Forget Arsenal, meet London's first globe-trotting football team". Islington Gazette.
- "Proud grandson tells of Reading FC 'hero' who survived the River Kwai death camp". Reading Chronicle. 2 June 2014.
- "ISLINGTON CORINTHIANS HERE SOON". eresources.nlb.gov.sg.
- WSF Press release
- "Islington Corinthians FC: The amateur football club that toured the world". The Daily Star. 16 July 2018.
