= John Paterson (footballer) =

Scottish footballer

Personal information
- Full name: John Paterson
- Date of birth: 14 December 1897
- Place of birth: Dundee, Scotland
- Date of death: 11 January 1973 (aged 75)
- Place of death: Dundee, Scotland
- Position: Forward

Youth career
- Dundee North End

Senior career*
Years	Team	Apps	(Gls)
1919–1920	Dundee	2	(0)
1920–1922	Leicester City	81	(34)
1922–1924	Sunderland	74	(37)
1924–1925	Preston North End	17	(0)
1925–1927	Queens Park Rangers	36	(6)
- Mid Rhondda
- Mansfield Town

International career
1920	Scotland	1	(0)
- * Club domestic league appearances and goals

John Paterson (born 14 December 1897 – 11 January 1973) was a Scottish footballer who played as a forward.

== Career ==
Born in Dundee, Paterson played club football for Dundee, Leicester City, Sunderland, Preston North End, Queens Park Rangers, Mid Rhondda and Mansfield Town, and made one appearance for Scotland in 1920. For Sunderland he scored 40 goals in 77 appearances in all competitions. Prior to his football career Paterson had been injured while serving with the Black Watch in World War I.
