= Bob Pollard (footballer) =

English footballer

Personal information
- Full name: Robert Pollard
- Date of birth: 25 August 1899
- Place of birth: Platt Bridge, England
- Height: 5 ft 6 in (1.68 m)
- Position: Full back

Senior career*
Years	Team	Apps	(Gls)
1916–1918	Platt Bridge United		
1918–1920	Park Lane		
1920–1929	Exeter City	246	(1)
1929–1932	Queens Park Rangers	56	(0)
1932–1933	Cardiff City	31	(0)
1933–?	Saint-Étienne		
- * Club domestic league appearances and goals

Robert Pollard (25 August 1899 – after 1933) was an English professional footballer who played as a full back. During his career, he made over 300 appearances in the Football League during spells with Exeter City, Queens Park Rangers and Cardiff City.

== Career ==
Born in Platt Bridge, Pollard began his career playing for local side Platt Bridge United before joining Lancashire Combination side Park Lane. In 1920, he joined Football League side Exeter City and made his professional debut in April 1921 against Luton Town. He went on to make over 250 appearances in all competitions for the club before moving to Queens Park Rangers in 1929.

He moved to Cardiff City in 1932 where he spent one season before joining French club Saint-Étienne.
