= Steve Smith (footballer, born 1896) =

English footballer

Personal information
- Full name: Stephen Charles Smith
- Date of birth: 27 March 1896
- Place of birth: Brereton, England
- Date of death: 1980 (aged 83–84)
- Position: Winger

Senior career*
Years	Team	Apps	(Gls)
1919–1922	West Ham United	27	(0)
1922–1925	Charlton Athletic	91	(9)
1925–1927	Southend United	79	(10)
1927–1928	Clapton Orient	6	(1)
1928–1929	Queens Park Rangers	24	(1)
1929	Mansfield Town		
Total		227	(21)
- * Club domestic league appearances and goals

Stephen Charles Smith (27 March 1896 – 1980) was an English footballer who played in the Football League for Charlton Athletic, Clapton Orient, Queens Park Rangers, Southend United and West Ham United.
