= Hugh Vallance =

English footballer

Personal information
- Full name: Hugh Baird Vallance
- Date of birth: 14 June 1905
- Place of birth: Wolverhampton, England
- Date of death: 19 June 1973 (aged 68)
- Place of death: Birmingham, England
- Position: Centre forward

Senior career*
Years	Team	Apps	(Gls)
- Kidderminster Harriers
1927–1928	Aston Villa	0	(0)
1928–1929	Queens Park Rangers	1	(0)
1929–1930	Brighton & Hove Albion	44	(32)
1930–1931	Worcester City	??	(11)
1931	Evesham Town		
1931	Tunbridge Wells Rangers		
1931–1932	Gillingham	13	(7)
- Kidderminster Harriers
- Nîmes Olympique
- FC Basel
- Brierley Hill Alliance
1934–1935	Gillingham	5	(3)
- Racing Club de Paris
- Cork City
- Evesham Town
- * Club domestic league appearances and goals

Hugh Baird Vallance (14 June 1905 – 19 June 1973) was an English professional association footballer who played as a centre-forward.

== Career ==
Vallance was born in Wolverhampton, England. After serving in the army as a guardsman, he began his football career with Kidderminster Harriers. He moved to Aston Villa in 1927, but left to join Queens Park Rangers without having broken into the first team. He made just one appearance for Rangers before moving to Brighton & Hove Albion in the spring of 1929. He was given his chance by Brighton manager Charlie Webb and soon established himself in the Brighton attack alongside Dan Kirkwood. In the 1929–30 season, Vallance scored four hat-tricks before the end of the year. By the end of the season, Vallance had scored 30 league goals in 37 games, while his strike partner Kirkwood had netted 38 in 40. The following season, Vallance scored twice in the first seven games before his Brighton contract was terminated for a "serious misdemeanour" at the same time as that of Ireland international Jack Curran.

He joined Worcester City and within six months went to Evesham Town and Tunbridge Wells Rangers before returning to the league with Gillingham. Despite 7 goals in 13 league games he was released and rejoined Kidderminster Harriers. His next move was to France and Nîmes Olympique, from where he moved to FC Basel. From Switzerland he moved to the less exotic Brierley Hill Alliance before returning to Gillingham. After 3 goals in 5 league games, Vallance moved to Racing Club de Paris and subsequently played for Cork City before ending his career with Evesham Town.

After leaving professional football Vallance served in the Royal Air Force. Vallance died in Birmingham in 1973.
