= Ollie Thompson =

English footballer

Personal information
- Full name: Oliver Thompson
- Date of birth: 11 May 1900
- Place of birth: Wheatley Hill, England
- Date of death: 1975 (aged 74–75)
- Height: 5 ft 8 1/2 in (1.74 m)
- Positions: Left half; right half

Senior career*
Years	Team	Apps	(Gls)
	Spennymoor United	?	(?)
1921–1922	Merthyr Town	0	(0)
1922–1928	Chesterfield	218	(3)
1928–1929	Queens Park Rangers	18	(0)
1929–1932	York City	121	(2)
1932–1933	Halifax Town	41	(1)
1933	Chesterfield	0	(0)
- * Club domestic league appearances and goals

Oliver Thompson (born 11 May 1900 in Wheatley Hill, County Durham, England, died 1975) was an English footballer.

During his career, he played for Spennymoor United, Merthyr Town, Chesterfield, Queens Park Rangers, York City and Halifax Town.

== Career ==
Thompson joined Merthyr Town from Spennymoor United in 1921. After having made no league appearances for the club, he joined Chesterfield in 1922. After making a total of 218 league appearances for Chesterfield, he joined Queens Park Rangers in 1928, who he made a total of 18 league appearances for. Thompson joined York City in June 1929 from Queens Park Rangers and was the team's captain for their first three seasons in the Football League. After making a total of 133 appearances, he joined Halifax Town in 1932. He made 41 league appearances for the club, and re-joined Chesterfield in 1933, but made no league appearances for them. However, he stayed at the club as a trainer until 1966.
