= George Hebden (footballer) =

English footballer

Personal information
- Full name: George Horace Robert Hebden
- Date of birth: 2 June 1900
- Place of birth: England
- Date of death: 18 August 1973 (aged 73)

Senior career*
Years	Team	Apps	(Gls)
–1925	Leicester City	101	(0)
1925–1927	Queens Park Rangers	59	(0)
1927–1929	Gillingham	70	(0)
- * Club domestic league appearances and goals

George Horace Robert Hebden (2 June 1900 – 18 August 1973) was an English professional footballer who played as a goalkeeper. He played for Leicester City, Queens Park Rangers and Gillingham between 1920 and 1930.
