= Jimmy Eggleton =

English footballer and manager

Personal information
- Full name: James Arthur Edward Eggleton
- Date of birth: 29 August 1897
- Place of birth: Heston, England
- Date of death: 13 January 1963 (aged 65)
- Place of death: Hillingdon, England
- Position: Centre half

Senior career*
Years	Team	Apps	(Gls)
–1921	Slough		
1921–1923	Charlton Athletic	26	(0)
1923–1926	Watford	48	(2)
1926	Lincoln City	0	(0)
1926–1930	Queens Park Rangers	42	(0)
1930	Canterbury Waverley		

Managerial career
- 1954: Queens Park Rangers (reserves)
- * Club domestic league appearances and goals

James Arthur Edward Eggleton (29 August 1897 – 13 January 1963) was an English professional footballer who played as a centre half. He is best remembered for his long association with Queens Park Rangers, whom he served as a player, trainer, reserve team manager and odd-job man manager for 37 years. Eggleton also played for Football League clubs Watford and Charlton Athletic.

== Personal life ==
Eggleton served as a gunner in the Royal Artillery during the First World War and was gassed during the course of his service.

== Career statistics ==
Appearances and goals by club, season and competition
Club	Season	League			FA Cup		Other		Total	
Club	Season	Division	Apps	Goals	Apps	Goals	Apps	Goals	Apps	Goals
Charlton Athletic	1921–22	Third Division South	2	0	0	0	—		2	0
Charlton Athletic	1922–23	Third Division South	15	0	0	0	—		15	0
Charlton Athletic	1923–24	Third Division South	9	0	0	0	—		9	0
Charlton Athletic	Total		26	0	0	0	—		26	0
Watford	1923–24	Third Division South	15	1	4	0	—		19	1
Watford	1924–25	Third Division South	20	1	0	0	—		20	1
Watford	1925–26	Third Division South	13	0	0	0	—		13	0
Watford	Total		48	2	4	0	—		52	2
Queens Park Rangers	1926–27	Third Division South	12	0	0	0	0	0	12	0
Queens Park Rangers	1927–28	Third Division South	26	0	1	0	2 (Note: 1 appearance in London Challenge Cup, 1 appearance in London Professional Charity Fund)	0	29	0
Queens Park Rangers	1928–29	Third Division South	4	0	0	0	0	0	4	0
Queens Park Rangers	Total		42	0	1	0	2	0	45	0
Career total			116	2	5	0	2	0	123	2
