= Arthur Sales (footballer, born 1900) =

English footballer

Personal information
- Full name: Arthur Alfred Sales
- Date of birth: 4 March 1900
- Place of birth: Lewes, England
- Date of death: 1977 (aged 76–77)
- Position: Half-back

Senior career*
Years	Team	Apps	(Gls)
1923–1924	Redhill		
1924–1928	Chelsea	7	(0)
1930–1932	Queens Park Rangers	35	(0)
1932–1933	Olympique Alès		
1933–1934	Bournemouth & Boscombe Athletic	0	(0)
Total		42	(0)
- * Club domestic league appearances and goals

Arthur Alfred Sales (4 March 1900 – 1977) was an English footballer who played in the Football League for Chelsea and Queens Park Rangers.
