= Ernie Whatmore =

English footballer

Personal information
- Date of birth: 25 April 1900
- Place of birth: Kidderminster, England
- Date of death: 31 July 1991 (aged 91)
- Place of death: Kidderminster, England
- Positions: Forward; wing half

Senior career*
| Years | Team | Apps | (Gls) |
| 1921–1922 | Stourbridge | | |
| 1922–1923 | Wolverhampton Wanderers (trial) | 2 | (0) |
| 1923 | Shrewsbury Town | 11 | |
| 1923–1928 | Bristol Rovers | 134 | (40) |
| 1928–1933 | Queens Park Rangers | 78 | (3) |
| 1933 | Shepherd's Bush | | |
| 1933–? | Stourbridge | | |
- * Club domestic league appearances and goals

Ernest L. Whatmore (25 April 1900 – 31 July 1991) was a professional footballer who played in The Football League for Wolverhampton Wanderers, Bristol Rovers and Queens Park Rangers during the interwar period.

Whatmore began his career with Stourbridge three years after the conclusion of the First World War. He played there for a year before joining Wolves on trial in 1922, but in spite of playing in two games for them in the Football League Second Division the club opted not to retain his services. He spent the remainder of the 1922–23 season with Shrewsbury Town, with whom he won both the Birmingham & District League and the Shropshire Senior Cup.

He returned to the Football League in the summer of 1923 when he joined Bristol Rovers, and went on to make 134 League appearances for them during a five-year stay. He moved to London in 1928 to join Queens Park Rangers, and after four and a half years with them he joined Shepherd's Bush in February 1933. In the summer of that year he returned to his first club, Stourbridge.

In his later years, Whatmore lived in a nursing home in his home town of Kidderminster, and he died on 31 July 1991 two weeks after breaking his hip in a fall.

== Sources ==
- Jay, Mike; Byrne, Stephen (1994). Pirates in Profile: A Who's Who of Bristol Rovers Players. Bristol: Potten, Baber & Murray. p. 287. ISBN 0-9524835-0-5.
- Joyce, Michael (2004). Football League Players' Records 1888 to 1939. Nottingham: SoccerData. p. 277. ISBN 1-899468-67-6.
