= George Goddard (footballer) =

English footballer

Personal information
- Date of birth: 20 December 1903
- Place of birth: Gomshall, England
- Date of death: April 1987
- Height: 1.88 m (6 ft 2 in)
- Position: Centre-forward

Senior career*
Years	Team	Apps	(Gls)
1923-1926	Redhill	?	(69)
1926-27	Queens Park Rangers	38	(23)
1927-28	Queens Park Rangers	34	(25)
1928-29	Queens Park Rangers	43	(38)
1929-30	Queens Park Rangers	45	(39)
1930-31	Queens Park Rangers	31	(27)
1931-32	Queens Park Rangers	27	(19)
1932-33	Queens Park Rangers	35	(14)
1933-34	Queens Park Rangers	7	(0)
1933-34	→ Brentford		
1933-34	→ Wolverhampton Wanderers,	16	(11)
1934-35	Wolverhampton Wanderers,	1	(0)
1934-35	→ Sunderland AFC	11	(4)
1935-36	Sunderland AFC	3	(2)
1935-36-37	→ Southend United FC	29	(18)
1937-38	Southend United FC	5	
- * Club domestic league appearances and goals

George Goddard (1903–1987) was a professional footballer who played as a centre forward in the 1920s and 1930s, notably with Queens Park Rangers F.C.. Goddard signed from Redhill in 1926 after being scouted by John Bowman, the former Rangers player and Norwich City manager. He scored 174 Football League goals (186 including cup goals) in 243 appearances for Queens Park Rangers, becoming the club's all time leading goalscorer. At Queens Park Rangers, Goddard netted an impressive 37 league goals in 41 league appearances during the 1929-30 campaign. Including 2 FA Cup goals he scored a total of 39 goals in only 45 games.

Goddard left Queens Park Rangers, in December 1933, being sold to Wolverhampton Wanderers for a transfer fee of £1,200 due to Queens Park Rangers poor financial state and needing to raise money due to their ill-fated spell at the White City Stadium.

Goddard also had spells at Sunderland and Southend United in the later stages of his career. Whilst with Southend he trained regularly with Brentford as he had business interests at Hampton Court.

Goddard married John Bowman's daughter in June 1931 in Harlesden.
