= 1925–26 Chelsea F.C. season =

English football club season

Chelsea
1925–26 season
- Chairman: Claude Kirby
- Manager: David Calderhead
- Stadium: Stamford Bridge
- Second Division: 3rd
- FA Cup: Fourth round
- Top goalscorer: League: Bob Turnbull (29); All: Bob Turnbull (30)
- Highest home attendance: 49,379 vs Fulham (26 September 1925)
- Lowest home attendance: 14,000 vs Clapton Orient (10 Feb 1926)
- Average home league attendance: 32,357
- Biggest win: 6–0 v Port Vale (5 September 1925)
- Biggest defeat: 0–4 v Portsmouth (1 May 1926)
Home colours	Away colours

The 1925–26 season was Chelsea Football Club's seventeenth competitive season.

== Players ==
Note: Flags indicate national team as defined under FIFA eligibility rules; some limited exceptions apply. Players may hold more than one non-FIFA nationality.

Pos.	Nation	Player
GK	ENG	Benjamin Baker
GK	ENG	Peter McKenna
DF	ENG	Harold Miller
DF	ENG	Harry Wilding
DF	SCO	George Rodgers
DF	ENG	Jack Harrow
DF	SCO	George Smith
DF	ENG	Fred Barrett
MF	ENG	Billy Brown

Pos.	Nation	Player
MF	SCO	John Priestley
FW	ENG	Jackie Crawford
FW	SCO	Willie Ferguson
FW	SCO	Bob McNeil
FW	ENG	George Stone
FW	ENG	Albert Thain
FW	SCO	Andrew Wilson
FW	SCO	Bob Turnbull

== Competitions ==
=== Overall record ===
Competition	First match	Last match	Starting round	Final position	Record							
Competition	First match	Last match	Starting round	Final position	Pld	W	D	L	GF	GA	GD	Win %
Second Division	29 August 1925	1 May 1926	Matchday 1	3rd	42	19	14	9	76	49	+27	45.24
FA Cup	9 January 1926	30 January 1926	Third round	Fourth round	2	1	0	1	3	3	+0	50.00
Total					44	20	14	10	79	52	+27	45.45

Source: Stamford-bridge.com

=== Second Division ===
==== League table ====
Pos	Team	Pld	W	D	L	GF	GA	GAv	Pts	Promotion or relegation
1	The Wednesday (C, P)	42	27	6	9	88	48	1.833	60	Promotion to the First Division
2	Derby County (P)	42	25	7	10	77	42	1.833	57	Promotion to the First Division
3	Chelsea	42	19	14	9	76	49	1.551	52	
4	Wolverhampton Wanderers	42	21	7	14	84	60	1.400	49	
5	Swansea Town	42	19	11	12	77	57	1.351	49	

(C) Champions; (P) Promoted

==== Results summary ====
Overall								Home						Away					
Pld	W	D	L	GF	GA	GAv	Pts	W	D	L	GF	GA	Pts	W	D	L	GF	GA	Pts
42	19	14	9	76	49	1.551	52	10	7	4	42	22	27	9	7	5	34	27	25

Source: Stamford-bridge.com

==== Matches ====
Win Draw Loss Fixtures

29 August 1925 1	Chelsea	2–0	Bradford City	Fulham
15:30 GMT	Thain 26'; Turnbull 80'	Report		Stadium: Stamford Bridge; Attendance: 31,443; Referee: Albert Caseley

31 August 1925 2	Nottingham Forest	1–5	Chelsea	West Bridgford
18:10 GMT	Harrow 76' (o.g.)	Report	Turnbull 7', 28'; Wilson 9', 24'; Stone 62'	Stadium: City Ground; Attendance: 9,981; Referee: Archie Caseley

5 September 1925 3	Port Vale	0–6	Chelsea	Hanley
15:15 GMT		Report	Crawford 23'; Thain 34'; Turnbull 35', 55'; Wilson 51'; Stone 61'	Stadium: Old Recreation Ground; Attendance: 12,801; Referee: Tom Bryan

7 September 1925 4	Chelsea	0–0	Nottingham Forest	Fulham
18:00 GMT		Report		Stadium: Stamford Bridge; Attendance: 22,352; Referee: Archie Caseley

12 September 1925 5	Chelsea	3–2	Barnsley	Fulham
15:30 GMT	Turnbull 38', 42', 54'	Report	Hine 62'; Halliwell 64'	Stadium: Stamford Bridge; Attendance: 35,161; Referee: Ernie Pinckston

19 September 1925 6	Clapton Orient	1–2	Chelsea	Clapton
15:30 GMT	Shea	Report	Turnbull 4', 47'	Stadium: Millfields Road; Attendance: 15,538; Referee: AJ Prince-Cox

26 September 1925 7	Chelsea	4–0	Fulham	Fulham
15:30 GMT	Ferguson 35'; Crawford 67'; Thain 75'; Wilson (pen.)	Report		Stadium: Stamford Bridge; Attendance: 49,379; Referee: W.E. Greenland

3 October 1925 8	Chelsea	4–0	Hull City	Fulham
15:15 GMT	Priestley 10'; Thain 17'; Turnbull 50'; Wilson (pen.)	Report		Stadium: Stamford Bridge; Attendance: 47,428; Referee: Harry Kingscott

10 October 1925 9	Darlington	1–1	Chelsea	Darlington
15:00 GMT	Brown 21'	Report	Turnbull 15'	Stadium: Feethams; Attendance: 16,897; Referee: R. Collinge

17 October 1925 10	South Shields	0–0	Chelsea	South Shields
15:15 GMT		Report		Stadium: Horsley Hill; Attendance: 11,805; Referee: Isaac Caswell

24 October 1925 11	Chelsea	5–0	Preston North End	Fulham
15:00 GMT	Thain 35', 58'; Turnbull (x2); Wilson	Report		Stadium: Stamford Bridge; Attendance: 40,539; Referee: Joseph Head

31 October 1925 12	Oldham Athletic	1–1	Chelsea	Oldham
15:00 GMT	Watson 42'	Report	Thain 70'	Stadium: Boundary Park; Attendance: 15,531; Referee: Herbert Mee

7 November 1925 13	Chelsea	3–2	Stockport County	Fulham
14:45 GMT	Turnbull 19', 54', 60'	Report	Mitchell 61'; Blood 64'	Stadium: Stamford Bridge; Attendance: 29,139; Referee: Lewis Vickery

14 November 1925 14	Wolverhampton Wanderers	0–0	Chelsea	Wolverhampton
14:45 GMT		Report		Stadium: Molineux Stadium; Attendance: 17,185; Referee: Henry Clayton

21 November 1925 15	Chelsea	1–3	Swansea Town	Fulham
14:30 GMT	Wilding 6'	Report	Thompson 20'; Fowler 22'; Hole 55'	Stadium: Stamford Bridge; Attendance: 43,827; Referee: Albert Caseley

28 November 1925 16	The Wednesday	4–1	Chelsea	Owlerton
14:30 GMT	Hill 18', 30', 46'; Trotter 72'	Report	Miller 80'	Stadium: Hillsborough Stadium; Attendance: 23,827; Referee: William Harper

5 December 1925 17	Chelsea	1–1	Stoke	Fulham
14:30 GMT	Thain 51'	Report	Davies 80'	Stadium: Stamford Bridge; Attendance: 23,382; Referee: David Asson

12 December 1925 18	Middlesbrough	1–2	Chelsea	Ayresome
14:15 GMT	Williams 65'	Report	Turnbull 70'; Barrett 87'	Stadium: Ayresome Park; Attendance: 14,395; Referee: William Forshaw

19 December 1925 19	Chelsea	0–0	Portsmouth	Fulham
14:30 GMT		Report		Stadium: Stamford Bridge; Attendance: 29,010; Referee: A. Richards

25 December 1925 20	Blackpool	0–0	Chelsea	Blackpool
11:00 GMT		Report		Stadium: Bloomfield Road; Attendance: 13,690; Referee: Ernie Pinckston

26 December 1925 21	Chelsea	2–3	Blackpool	Fulham
14:30 GMT	Thain 3'; Turnbull 30'	Report	Thorpe 32' (pen.); Meredith 44'; Fishwick 87'	Stadium: Stamford Bridge; Attendance: 49,707; Referee: Ernie Pinckston

28 December 1925 22	Derby County	4–2	Chelsea	Derby
14:15 GMT	Bedford 6', 61'; Storer 41'; Thoms 67'	Report	Thain 4'; Barrett 20'	Stadium: Baseball Ground; Attendance: 25,108; Referee: David Asson

2 January 1926 23	Bradford City	4–2	Chelsea	Bradford
14:15 GMT	McMillan 30'; Cheetham 36', 89'; Chalmers 60'	Report	Turnbull 46'; Priestley 56'	Stadium: Valley Parade; Attendance: 14,702; Referee: Albert Caseley

16 January 1926 24	Chelsea	3–1	Port Vale	Fulham
14:45 GMT	Thain 8'; Turnbull 46'; McNeil 68'	Report	Page	Stadium: Stamford Bridge; Attendance: 15,568; Referee: Tom Bryan

23 January 1926 25	Barnsley	2–3	Chelsea	Barnsley
14:45 GMT	Johnson 5'; Bedford 35'	Report	McNeil 17'; Crawford 47'; Thain 67'	Stadium: Oakwell; Attendance: 7,031; Referee: Ernie Pinckston

6 February 1926 26	Fulham	0–3	Chelsea	Fulham
15:15 GMT		Report	Priestley 3'; Thain 38'; Barrett 65' (pen.)	Stadium: Craven Cottage; Attendance: 42,611; Referee: W.E. Greenland

10 February 1926 27	Chelsea	1–3	Clapton Orient	Fulham
15:15 GMT	McNeil	Report	Cock 4'; McKay 49'; McLaughlan	Stadium: Stamford Bridge; Attendance: 14,000; Referee: AJ Prince-Cox

13 February 1926 28	Hull City	0–1	Chelsea	Hull
15:00 GMT		Report	Thain 25'	Stadium: Anlaby Road; Attendance: 9,464; Referee: Harry Kingscott

20 February 1926 29	Chelsea	5–2	Darlington	Fulham
15:30 GMT	Barrett 25', 75'; Wilding 46'; Wilson 51'; Priestley 67'	Report	Hooper 2'; McKenzie 6'	Stadium: Stamford Bridge; Attendance: 34,442; Referee: George Watson

27 February 1926 30	Chelsea	0–0	South Shields	Fulham
15:30 GMT		Report		Stadium: Stamford Bridge; Attendance: 38,242; Referee: Isaac Caswell

6 March 1926 31	Preston North End	3–1	Chelsea	Preston
15:00 GMT	James 55'; Jackson (x2)	Report	Miller 3'	Stadium: Deepdale; Attendance: 16,463; Referee: Ernie Westwood

13 March 1926 32	Chelsea	3–0	Oldham Athletic	Fulham
15:15 GMT	Turnbull 23', 58'; McNeil 43'	Report		Stadium: Stamford Bridge; Attendance: 28,889; Referee: A.H. Price

20 March 1926 33	Stockport County	0–0	Chelsea	Stockport
15:15 GMT		Report		Stadium: Edgeley Park; Attendance: 7,828; Referee: Lewis Vickery

27 March 1926 34	Chelsea	3–3	Wolverhampton Wanderers	Fulham
15:30 GMT	Turnbull 8', 20'; Brown 9'	Report	Scott 18', 58'; Phillipson	Stadium: Stamford Bridge; Attendance: 26,889; Referee: Henry Clayton

2 April 1926 35	Chelsea	0–0	Southampton	Fulham
15:00 GMT		Report		Stadium: Stamford Bridge; Attendance: 43,391; Referee: Edward Beards

3 April 1926 36	Swansea Town	0–0	Chelsea	Swansea
15:15 GMT		Report		Stadium: Vetch Field; Attendance: 20,993; Referee: C.F. Moon

5 April 1926 37	Southampton	0–1	Chelsea	Southampton
15:00 GMT		Report	Turnbull 30'	Stadium: The Dell; Attendance: 14,408; Referee: Edward Beards

10 April 1926 38	Chelsea	0–0	The Wednesday	Fulham
15:15 GMT		Report		Stadium: Stamford Bridge; Attendance: 41,817; Referee: William Harper

17 April 1926 39	Stoke	1–3	Chelsea	Stoke
15:15 GMT	Wilson 5'	Report	Turnbull 35', 80'; McNeil 65'	Stadium: Victoria Ground; Attendance: 10,268; Referee: David Asson

24 April 1926 40	Chelsea	0–1	Middlesbrough	Fulham
15:15 GMT		Report	McClelland 56'	Stadium: Stamford Bridge; Attendance: 25,552; Referee: William Forshaw

26 April 1926 41	Chelsea	2–1	Derby County	Fulham
18:00 GMT	Turnbull 25'; Thain 30'	Report	Bedford 20'	Stadium: Stamford Bridge; Attendance: 9,335; Referee: David Asson

1 May 1926 42	Portsmouth	4–0	Chelsea	Portsmouth
15:15 GMT	Mackie 10'; Goodwin 30', 85'; Cook 55'	Report		Stadium: Fratton Park; Attendance: 17,235; Referee: A. Timmins

=== FA Cup ===
Win Draw Loss Fixtures

9 January 1926 Third round	Plymouth Argyle	1–2	Chelsea	Plymouth
14:30 GMT	Cock 70'	Report	Turnbull 26'; McNeil 29'	Stadium: Home Park; Attendance: 31,025; Referee: Edwin Small

30 January 1926 Fourth round	Crystal Palace	2–1	Chelsea	Selhurst
14:45 GMT	Cherrett 32'; Hawkins 55'	Report	Thain 80'	Stadium: Selhurst Park; Attendance: 41,000; Referee: W.E. Greenland
