= 1919–20 Chelsea F.C. season =

English football club season

Chelsea
1919–20 season
- Chairman: Claude Kirby
- Manager: David Calderhead
- First Division: 3rd
- FA Cup: Semi-finals
- Top goalscorer: League: Jack Cock (21); All: Jack Cock (24)
- Highest home attendance: 70,000 vs Aston Villa (7 April 1920)
- Lowest home attendance: 12,000 vs Newcastle United (13 September 1919)
Home colours	Away colours

The 1919–1920 season Chelsea Football Club was 11th of competitive football. It was also the first full English football season since the end of World War I. It proved to be Chelsea's most successful season to that point, as they finished 3rd in the First Division and reached the FA Cup semi-finals.

== Table ==
Pos	Team	Pld	W	D	L	GF	GA	GAv	Pts	Relegation
1	West Bromwich Albion (C)	42	28	4	10	104	47	2.213	60	
2	Burnley	42	21	9	12	65	59	1.102	51	
3	Chelsea	42	22	5	15	56	51	1.098	49	
4	Liverpool	42	19	10	13	59	44	1.341	48	
5	Sunderland	42	22	4	16	72	59	1.220	48	
6	Bolton Wanderers	42	19	9	14	72	65	1.108	47	
7	Manchester City	42	18	9	15	71	62	1.145	45	
8	Newcastle United	42	17	9	16	44	39	1.128	43	
9	Aston Villa	42	18	6	18	75	73	1.027	42	
10	Arsenal	42	15	12	15	56	58	0.966	42	
11	Bradford (Park Avenue)	42	15	12	15	60	63	0.952	42	
12	Manchester United	42	13	14	15	54	50	1.080	40	
13	Middlesbrough	42	15	10	17	61	65	0.938	40	
14	Sheffield United	42	16	8	18	59	69	0.855	40	
15	Bradford City	42	14	11	17	54	63	0.857	39	
16	Everton	42	12	14	16	69	68	1.015	38	
17	Oldham Athletic	42	15	8	19	49	52	0.942	38	
18	Derby County	42	13	12	17	47	57	0.825	38	
19	Preston North End	42	14	10	18	57	73	0.781	38	
20	Blackburn Rovers	42	13	11	18	64	77	0.831	37	
21	Notts County (R)	42	12	12	18	56	74	0.757	36	Relegation to the Second Division
22	The Wednesday (R)	42	7	9	26	28	64	0.438	23	Relegation to the Second Division

Source: World Football
Rules for classification: 1) Points; 2) Goal average; 3) Goals scored
(C) Champions; (R) Relegated

== Results ==
=== First Division ===
Date	Opponent	Venue	Result	Attendance	Scorers
30 August 1919	Everton	A	3–2	35,000	Halse, Whittingham (pen), Wilding
1 September 1919	Sunderland	H	2–0	50,000	Wilding, Croal
6 September 1919	Everton	H	0–1	60,000	
10 September 1919	Sunderland	A	2–3	35,000	Brittan, Croal
13 September 1919	Newcastle United	H	0–0	12,000	
20 September 1919	Newcastle United	A	0–3	40,000	
27 September 1919	Burnley	H	0–1	38,000	
4 October 1919	Burnley	A	3–2	25,000	Croal, Abrams (2)
11 October 1919	Liverpool	H	1–0	35,000	Brittan
18 October 1919	Liverpool	A	1–0	25,000	Brittan
25 October 1919	Bradford Park Avenue	A	0–1	18,000	
1 November 1919	Bradford Park Avenue	H	4–0	36,000	Ford, Cock (2), Croal
8 November 1919	Preston North End	A	1–3	20,000	Cock
15 November 1919	Preston North End	H	4–0	34,000	Cock (3), McNeil
22 November 1919	Middlesbrough	A	0–0	20,000	
29 November 1919	Middlesbrough	H	3–1	50,000	Cock (2), Croal
6 December 1919	Arsenal	A	1–1	50,000	Cock
13 December 1919	Arsenal	H	3–1	60,000	Ford, Cock, McNeil
20 December 1919	Sheffield United	A	1–3	25,000	Halse
25 December 1919	Aston Villa	A	2–5	30,000	Dale, McNeil
26 December 1919	Oldham Athletic	H	1–0	40,000	Harrow
27 December 1919	Sheffield United	H	1–0	40,000	Cock
1 January 1920	Oldham Athletic	A	0–1	12,000	
3 January 1920	Manchester United	A	2–0	25,000	Cock (2)
17 January 1920	Manchester United	H	1–0	40,000	Cock
24 January 1920	Bradford City	A	1–3	18,000	Browning
4 February 1920	Bradford City	H	1–0	25,000	Logan
7 February 1920	Bolton Wanderers	A	2–1	20,000	Cock, Croal
14 February 1920	Bolton Wanderers	H	2–3	45,000	Cock (2)
28 February 1920	Blackburn Rovers	H	2–1	52,000	Sharp (2)
11 March 1920	Blackburn Rovers	A	1–3	12,000	Logan
13 March 1920	Notts County	A	1–0	15,000	Sharp
17 March 1920	Notts County	H	2–0	25,000	Wilding, Cock
20 March 1920	The Wednesday	H	1–1	47,000	Lee
2 April 1920	Aston Villa	H	2–1	70,000	Cock, Hardy (o.g.)
3 April 1920	Manchester City	H	1–0	40,000	Cock
6 April 1920	The Wednesday	A	2–0	15,000	Halse, Cock
10 April 1920	Manchester City	A	0–1	25,000	
17 April 1920	Derby County	H	0–0	40,000	
24 April 1920	Derby County	A	0–5	20,000	
26 April 1920	West Bromwich Albion	H	2–0	39,902	Harrow (pen), Ford
1 May 1920	West Bromwich Albion	A	0–4	35,668	

=== FA Cup ===
Date	Round	Opponent	Venue	Result	Attendance	Scorers
10 January 1920	1	Bolton Wanderers	A	1–0	35,298	Cock
31 January 1920	2	Swindon Town	H	4–0	67,054	Ford, Cock, McNeil (2)
21 February 1920	3	Leicester City	H	3–0	40,000	Ford, Cock, Browning
6 March 1920	4	Bradford Park Avenue	H	4–1	61,223	Logan, Wilding, Sharp (2)
21 March 1920	SF	Aston Villa	N	1–3	37,771	Croal
