= 1913 Scottish Cup final =

1913 Scottish Cup Final
- Event: 1912–13 Scottish Cup
Falkirk	Raith Rovers
2	0
- Date: 12 April 1913
- Venue: Celtic Park, Glasgow

The 1913 Scottish Cup Final was the 40th final of the Scottish Cup, Scottish football's most prestigious knockout association football competition. The match took place at Celtic Park on 12 April 1913 and was contested by Division One clubs Falkirk and Raith Rovers. It was both Falkirk's and Raith's début appearance in the Scottish Cup Final.

Both clubs entered the second round, receiving byes along with 28 of the 36 other clubs in the tournament. Neither club won all four of their ties at the first attempt, Falkirk requiring a replay to knock out fellow Division One club Morton in the second round. Falkirk went on to defeat Rangers, Dumbarton and Heart of Midlothian, all previous winners of the cup. Raith Rovers defeated non-league club Broxburn United before knocking out three Division One clubs, needing a replay to eliminate both Hibernian and the previous season's runners-up, Clyde, in the semi-finals.

Neither team had ever made an appearance in the final. The match remains Raith Rovers' only appearance in the Scottish Cup Final to date.

Falkirk won the match 2–0. They took the lead in the first half when Jimmy Robertson scored. Their lead was then extended in the second half to 2–0 with a goal from Tom Logan to conclude victory for Falkirk.

== Route to the final ==
Round	Opposition	Score
Second round	Morton	2–2
Second round replay	Morton	3–1
Third round	Rangers	3–1
Quarter-final	Dumbarton	1–0
Semi-final	Heart of Midlothian	1–0

=== Falkirk ===
Falkirk received a bye into the second round and faced Division One club Morton at Cappielow in Greenock, with the match ending in a 2–2 draw to force a replay. The replay, a week later, was played at Falkirk's home of Brockville Park with the home team producing a 3–1 victory to progress to the next round. The club's opponents in the third round were 10-time finalists of the tournament, Rangers. The tie was played at Rangers' home Ibrox Stadium and Falkirk scored three first-half goals in a shock 3–1 victory over the club. The quarter-finals saw Division Two club Dumbarton travel to Falkirk, with the home team producing a 1–0 victory to progress to the semi-finals for only the second time in its history. In the semi-final Falkirk faced Edinburgh club Heart of Midlothian at a neutral venue, travelling to Ibrox Park for a second time in the tournament. Falkirk won the match 1–0 and booked a place in its first ever Scottish Cup Final.

=== Raith Rovers ===
Round	Opposition	Score
Second round	Broxburn United	5–0
Third round	Hibernian	2–2
Third round replay	Hibernian	1–0
Quarter-final	St Mirren	2–1
Semi-final	Clyde	1–1
Semi-final replay	Clyde	1–0

Like their final opponents, Raith Rovers also received a bye into the second round, being drawn against non-league club Broxburn United away from home. The club produced an emphatic 5–0 victory to advance to the third round. Division One club Hibernian from Edinburgh was the opposition provided for the club in the next round, the two clubs playing out a 2–2 draw in Kirkcaldy. In the replay at Hibernian, Raith emerged on top with a narrow 1–0 victory. In the quarter-finals the club faced another Division One club, St Mirren. The match was played at home and the club won 2–1 to progress to the semi-finals. The runners-up of the previous season's competition, Clyde, played the club for a place in the final. The match ended in 1–1 draw at the neutral venue of Tynecastle Stadium in Edinburgh and forced a replay, Clyde's fifth of the tournament. Rovers managed to overcome their opponents with 1–0 victory a week later, to advance to their first ever Scottish Cup Final.

== Match details ==
Falkirk	Raith Rovers

12 April 1913
15:00

Falkirk	2–0	Raith Rovers
J Robertson; T Logan

Celtic Park, Glasgow
Attendance: 45,000

GK	(Scotland) Alex Stewart
RB	(Scotland) Robert Orrock
LB	(Scotland) John Donaldson
RH	(Scotland) Steve McDonald
CH	(Scotland) Tom Logan
LH	(Scotland) James McMillan
OR	(Scotland) Johnny McNaught
IR	(Scotland) Mick Gibbons
CF	(Scotland) Jimmy Robertson
IL	(Scotland) Jimmy Croal
OL	(Scotland) Robert Terris
Manager:
(Scotland) Willie Nicol

GK	(Scotland) Robert MacLeod
RB	(Scotland) William Morrison
LB	(Scotland) Arthur Cumming
RH	(Scotland) James Gibson
CH	(Scotland) Jimmy Logan
LH	(Scotland) Harry Anderson
OR	(Scotland) Thomas Cranston
IR	(Scotland) Harry Graham
CF	(England) Fred Martin
IL	(Scotland) Jimmy Gourlay
OL	(South Africa) Fred Gibson
Manager:
James Tod
