= Jimmy Robertson (footballer, born 1885) =

Scottish footballer

Jimmy Robertson MM
Personal information
- Full name: James Robertson
- Date of birth: 15 March 1885
- Place of birth: Alexandria, Scotland
- Date of death: 26 April 1968 (aged 83)
- Place of death: London, England
- Height: 5 ft 8 in (1.73 m)
- Position: Forward

Youth career
- Bonhill Union

Senior career*
Years	Team	Apps	(Gls)
1903–1905	Vale of Leven		
- Distillery
1905–1908	Blackburn Rovers	78	(22)
1908–1909	Brighton & Hove Albion	23	(5)
1909–1911	Vale of Leven	33	(21)
1911–1919	Falkirk	160	(75)
1915	→ Dunfermline Athletic (wartime)		
- → Armadale (wartime)
- → Vale of Leven (wartime)
19??–1921	Dumbarton Harp		
1921–1922	Dumbarton	30	(2)
- * Club domestic league appearances and goals

James Robertson MM (15 March 1885 – 26 April 1968) was a Scottish professional footballer who played as a forward in the Football League for Blackburn Rovers, in the Scottish League for Vale of Leven, Falkirk and Dumbarton, and in the English Southern League for Brighton & Hove Albion.

== Life and career ==
Robertson was born in Alexandria, Dunbartonshire, in 1885. He played juvenile football for the Bonhill Union club before signing for Vale of Leven in 1903. In the 1904–05 season, he scored in all but three of Vale's matches, and his goalscoring attracted attention from major clubs on both sides of the border, including Aston Villa and Rangers. In May 1905, he went to England to join Blackburn Rovers. The additional £50 payable should Robertson play for Rovers' first team was soon forthcoming, as he went on to score 22 goals from 78 Football League First Division matches over three seasons, before moving on to the English Southern League with Brighton & Hove Albion. After a single season in which both he and his team struggled for form, he was one of several players released and he returned to Vale of Leven, by then a member of the Scottish League.

He was appointed captain of Vale and returned to form, topping the Division Two scoring charts in 1909–10. In February 1911, he was transferred to Division One club Falkirk: Blackburn Rovers still held his league registration, and included it as a makeweight in their purchase of Jock Simpson. Vale of Leven had hoped that Falkirk would not want the player and would immediately transfer him back to them, but that did not happen. He went straight into Falkirk's team for the next match, against Clyde, and scored twice in a 4–1 win. Thus he began a lengthy stay, interrupted by the First World War, in which he scored 75 goals from 160 Division One matches and was Falkirk's top scorer for each of his first four full seasons.

In 1912–13, he played for the Home Scots against the Anglos in an international trial. The Glasgow Herald's reporter thought the "disappointing" match would be of little value to the selectors, in part because of a perceived lack of effort by some of the participants compared with that shown in a competitive fixture. Robertson hit the crossbar in the first half, the match finished goalless, and no call-up ensued. That same season, he helped Falkirk reach the Cup Final, in which they faced Raith Rovers at Celtic Park. Despite the Courier's view that Robertson was "the least noticeable" of Falkirk's forwards, as [James] Logan "saw to it that the bulky centre did not get off the leash", he was off it long enough to open the scoring after Jimmy Croal's shot was saved, and Tom Logan's second-half goal gave his team a 2–0 win and their first Scottish Cup.

During the war, Robertson served as a sergeant in the Highland Light Infantry, and was awarded the Croix de Guerre and the Military Medal. He was able to play wartime football, when his military duties allowed, and turned out for teams including Dunfermline Athletic, Armadale and Vale of Leven. He played for Vale after the war, as well as for Dumbarton Harp, and had one last season in Division One with Dumbarton.

Robertson died in London in 1968 at the age of 83.
