= John Brown (footballer, born 1887) =

Scottish footballer

Personal information
- Full name: John Brown
- Date of birth: 15 October 1887
- Place of birth: Clackmannan, Scotland
- Date of death: 6 December 1943 (aged 56)
- Place of death: Dundee, Scotland
- Position: Outside left

Youth career
- Tulliallan Juveniles

Senior career*
Years	Team	Apps	(Gls)
	Clackmannan	1905–1906	
1906–1907	Hearts of Beath		
1907–1908	Alloa Athletic		
1908–1911	Falkirk	51	(15)
1911–1913	Celtic	40	(7)
1912	→ Chelsea (loan)	0	(0)
1913–1915	Chelsea	16	(4)
1915–1916	Falkirk	25	(4)
- Raith Rovers
- Dunfermline Athletic
1920–1921	Clackmannan		
1921–1925	Lochgelly United	23	(4)

International career
1912	Scottish League XI	1	(0)

Managerial career
- 1921–1925: Lochgelly United
- * Club domestic league appearances and goals

John Brown (15 October 1887 – 6 December 1943) was a Scottish professional footballer who played as an outside-left.

== Club career ==
After a spell at Alloa Athletic where he played alongside elder brother William and both also worked in the local mines, Brown joined Falkirk in 1908. While his brother was killed in a mine shaft collapse in 1909, John escaped life in the pits, his career continued to progress and he signed for Celtic in 1911. His time in Glasgow started well, and after displacing veteran Davie Hamilton in the side, he was selected for the Scottish Football League XI for a game against The Football League XI, followed two months later by a Scottish Cup win, Clyde being defeated in the 1912 final.

He began to be overshadowed by John Browning at Celtic and was loaned to English side Chelsea in December 1912, the switch being made permanent two months later. However, after making 11 Football League appearances for the Blues (scoring three goals) in his first half-season in West London, Brown was a backup to Billy Bridgeman, then fellow Scot Bob McNeil, and played only five more matches at that level in the next two years – instead he was a regular in the reserves, with 51 games (seven goals) in two seasons.

With English football suspended due to the First World War, in 1915 Brown returned to Falkirk (also serving in the Black Watch during the conflict), and later appeared for hometown team Clackmannan and for various teams in Fife, latterly Lochgelly United where he also served as manager. He was also a coach at Dundee, working with former Celtic teammate Alec McNair. Away from football he operated a sweet shop in Glencraig and a fish-and-chip business in Broughty Ferry.
