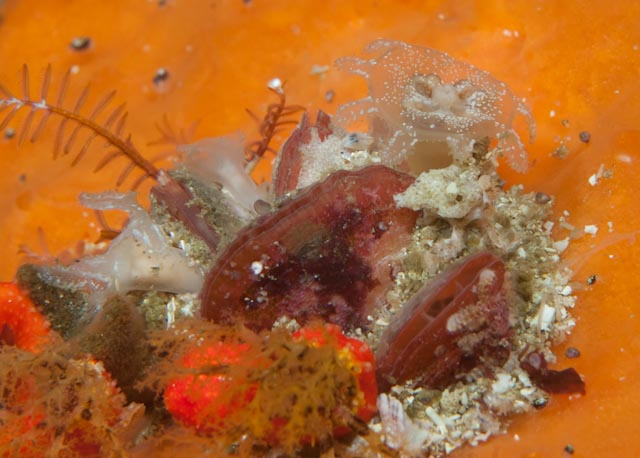
- Possible Lipkea stephensoni seen at Atlantis Reef, False Bay, Cape Town

Scientific classification
- Kingdom: Animalia
- Phylum: Cnidaria
- Class: Staurozoa
- Order: Stauromedusae
- Family: Lipkeidae
- Genus: Lipkea
- Species: L. stephensoni

Binomial name
- Lipkea stephensoni Carlgren, 1933

= Bell stalked jelly =

Species of jellyfish

The bell trumpet jelly (Lipkea stephensoni), is a species of stalked jellyfish in the family Lipkeidae.

== Description ==
This small stalked jellyfish grows up to 1 cm across and is pale and transparent. Four distinct opaque white lines run down the bell and into the mouth, which is surrounded by four horseshoe-shaped gonads. The bell has opaque white spots. Several lobes extend from the margin of the bell.

== Distribution ==
This stalked jellyfish has been found in Smitswinkel Bay off Cape Town in less than 10m of water.
