= 1912–13 Scottish Cup =

Tournament details
- Country: Scotland
- Teams: 34

Final positions
- Champions: Falkirk
- Runners-up: Raith Rovers

Tournament statistics
- Matches played: 45
- Goals scored: 107 (2.38 per match)

The 1912–13 Scottish Cup was the 40th staging of Scotland's most prestigious football knockout competition. The cup was won by Falkirk who defeated Raith Rovers in the final.

== Calendar ==
Round	First match date	Fixtures			Clubs
Round	First match date	Original	Replays	2nd replays	Clubs
First round	Saturday 25 January 1913	2	1	0	34 → 32
Second round	Saturday 8 February 1913	16	5	2	32 → 16
Third round	Saturday 22 February 1913	8	1	0	16 → 8
Quarter-finals	Saturday 8 March 1913	4	1	1	8 → 4
Semi-finals	Saturday 29 March 1913	2	1	0	4 → 2
Final	Sunday 12 April 1913	1	0	0	2 → 1

== First round ==
Home team	Score	Away team
Hamilton Academical	0 – 0	St Bernard's
Kilmarnock	3 – 0	Nithsdale Wanderers

=== Replays ===
Home team	Score	Away team
St Bernard's	0 – 3	Hamilton Academical

== Second round ==
Home team	Score	Away team
Aberdeen University	0 – 3	Peebles Rovers
Ayr United	0 – 2	Airdrieonians
Broxburn United	0 – 5	Raith Rovers
Celtic	4 – 0	Arbroath
Clyde	0 – 0	East Stirlingshire
Dumbarton	2 – 1	Aberdeen
Dundee	5 – 0	Thornhill
Hamilton Academical	1 – 1	Rangers
Heart of Midlothian	3 – 1	Dunfermline Athletic
Kilmarnock	5 – 1	Abercorn
Morton	2 – 2	Falkirk
Motherwell	1 – 1	Hibernian
Partick Thistle	4 – 1	Caledonian
Queen's Park	4 – 2	Dundee Hibernian
St Johnstone	3 – 0	East Fife
St Mirren	0 – 0	Third Lanark

=== Replays ===
Home team	Score	Away team
East Stirlingshire	1 – 1	Clyde
Falkirk	3 – 1	Morton
Hibernian	0 – 0	Motherwell
Rangers	2 – 0	Hamilton Academical
Third Lanark	0 – 2	St Mirren

=== Second replays ===
Played at Shawfield and Celtic Park respectively.

Home team	Score	Away team
Clyde	1 – 0	East Stirlingshire
Hibernian	2 – 1	Motherwell

== Third round ==
Home team	Score	Away team
Clyde	1 – 0	Queen's Park
Dumbarton	1 – 0	St Johnstone
Kilmarnock	0 – 2	Heart of Midlothian
Partick Thistle	0 – 1	Dundee
Celtic	3 – 0	Peebles Rovers
Raith Rovers	2 – 2	Hibernian
Rangers	1 – 3	Falkirk
St Mirren	1 – 0	Airdrieonians

=== Replay ===
Home team	Score	Away team
Hibernian	0 – 1	Raith Rovers

== Quarter-finals ==
Home team	Score	Away team
Celtic	0 – 1	Heart of Midlothian
Dundee	0 – 0	Clyde
Falkirk	1 – 0	Dumbarton
Raith Rovers	2 – 1	St Mirren

=== Replay ===
Home team	Score	Away team
Clyde	1 – 1	Dundee

=== Second replay ===
Played at Hampden Park.

Home team	Score	Away team
Clyde	2 – 1	Dundee

== Semi-finals ==
29 March 1913

Falkirk	1 – 0	Heart of Midlothian

Ibrox Park, Glasgow

29 March 1913

Raith Rovers	1 – 1	Clyde

Tynecastle, Edinburgh

=== Replay ===
5 April 1913

Raith Rovers	1 – 0	Clyde

Tynecastle, Edinburgh

== Final ==
12 April 1913

Falkirk	2 – 0	Raith Rovers
J Robertson; T Logan

Celtic Park, Glasgow
Attendance: 45,000

== See also ==
- 1912–13 in Scottish football
