= Fred Gibson (soccer, born 1888) =

South African soccer player

Personal information
- Full name: Frederick Thomas Bertrand Gibson
- Date of birth: 8 December 1888
- Place of birth: Pilgrim's Rest, South African Republic
- Date of death: 15 March 1952 (aged 63)
- Place of death: Nuneaton, England
- Height: 5 ft 6 in (1.68 m)
- Position: Outside left

Senior career*
Years	Team	Apps	(Gls)
1906–1907	Iona Star		
1907–1908	Bedworth Town		
1908–1909	Sunderland Royal Rovers		
1909–1910	Sunderland	2	(0)
1910–1911	Raith Rovers	25	(3)
1911–1912	Dunfermline Athletic		
1912–1917	Raith Rovers	138	(37)
1917–1919	Heart of Midlothian	29	(3)
1919–1922	Coventry City	54	(5)
1922–1923	Nuneaton Town		
1923–1924	Atherstone Town		
1924–192?	Collycroft United		
- * Club domestic league appearances and goals

Frederick Thomas Bertrand Gibson (8 December 1888 – 15 March 1952) was a South African professional footballer who played as an outside left for several clubs in Scotland and England including Sunderland, Raith Rovers (playing in the 1913 Scottish Cup Final), Heart of Midlothian and Coventry City.
