= Reef burials =

Burial process

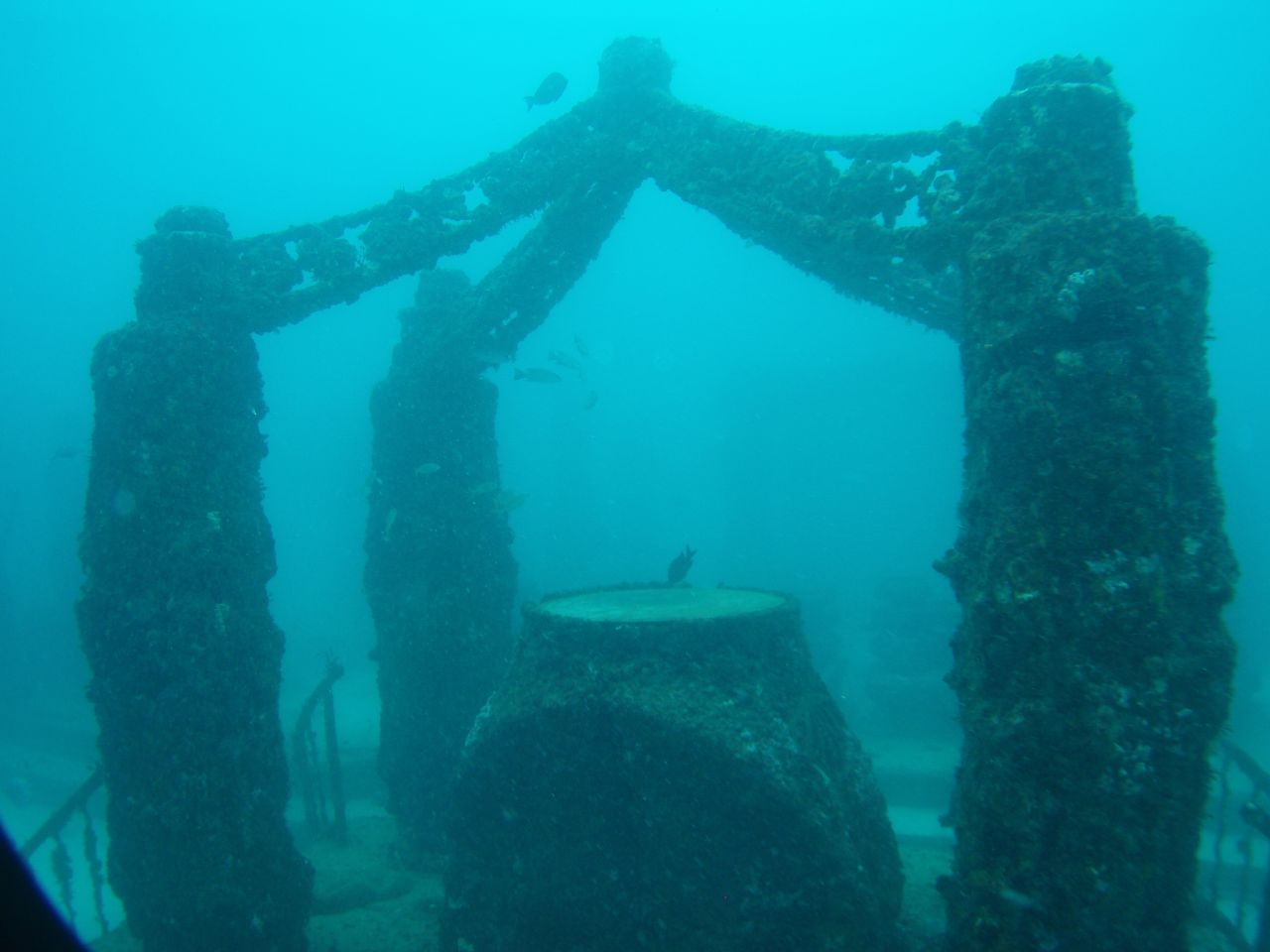
Neptune Memorial Reef

Reef burials are a type of green or natural burial considered by some to be an eco-friendly alternative to traditional burial. Cremation ash is mixed with concrete to form objects that are placed on the seafloor to encourage wildlife in areas where sea life has been diminished.

== Background ==
Reef burials are a new burial practice gaining a degree of popularity. Rather than being buried in the earth, a person's remains are cremated and the resulting ash is mixed with pH-balanced concrete to create structures which are placed on the seabed to help restore marine habitats similar to a coral reef. The concrete is mixed using fibreglass rather than metal, so that it does not rust and has the same pH balance as the sea. In areas where the seafloor or coral reefs have been destroyed the structures help to renew the sea-life by establishing new habitats for fish and crustaceans. The structures are expected to last for 500 years and are variously perforated domes called "reef balls", pyramids, or similar memorial-style shapes chosen to be appropriate to the location. Reef balls weigh between 800 and 4,000 pounds (360 and 1,810 kg) and their perforations ensure that storm pressure doesn't move them out of place on the sea floor.

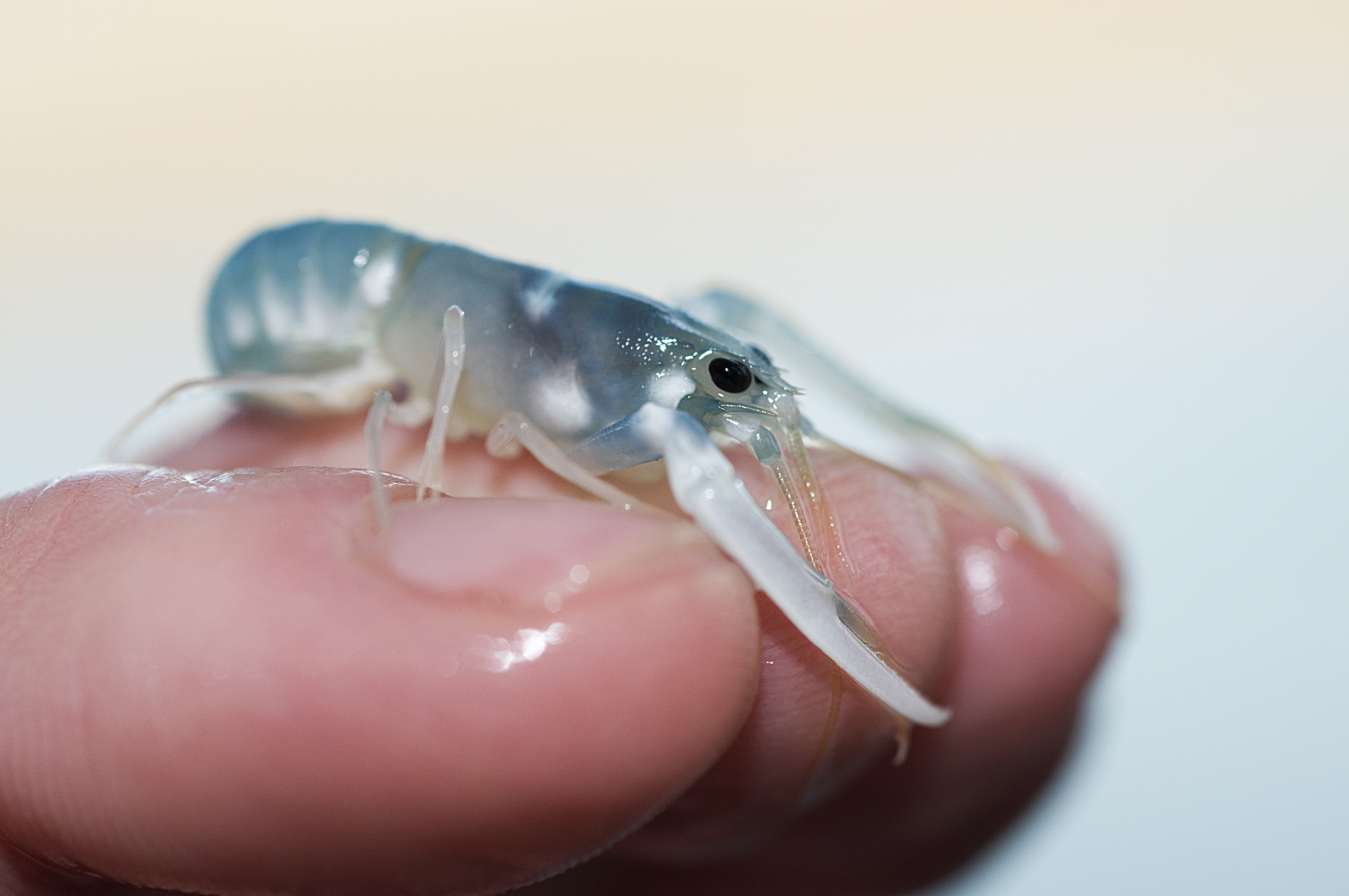
Young lobster

Reef burials are popular amongst divers and others who love the sea. Some people feel that such burials offer the deceased a second life as part of a living reef. Loved ones are given the GPS coordinates of the resting place so that they dive to visit the site of the remains. A memorial plaque is installed with the person's name, date of birth and death. Thousands of reef balls are put into oceans each year. Large reef memorials can accommodate multiple sets of remains, so that families can be included and placed together.

== Locations ==
In the United States there are more than thirty permitted locations for reef memorials, including off the coasts of Florida at Mexico Beach, Egg Harbor, near Atlantic City, New Jersey and Texas. In the UK, where the Crown Estate owns the UK seabed, a square-kilometre site off the coast of Weymouth and Portland has been designated for this use in the 'Wreck to Reef' area, with a particular focus on creating structures to shelter young lobsters until their shells grow. Artificial reef balls were first used at Jurien reef in Western Australia in 2015. In Bali, Resting Reef operates two memorial sites in areas severely affected by unsustainable fishing and coral mining. These reefs aim to restore marine ecosystems and create job opportunities for local residents.

In 2019, the first reef burials were placed in the water using a crane in the Venice lagoon in Italy.

Despite growing popularity, the process still involves both cremation and concrete, both of which carry an environmental cost. Cremation, depending on the age of the crematorium, releases around 540 pounds (240 kg) of CO_{2} and the concrete sector is responsible for 8 percent of global CO_{2} production.

== Sea rewilding ==
Depending on the locations, different varieties of coral can grow on the surface of the concrete, and algae, diatoms, eels, fish and invertebrates will come to live on the structure. Each one contributes to a unique ecosystem and provides a permanent environment for all marine life.

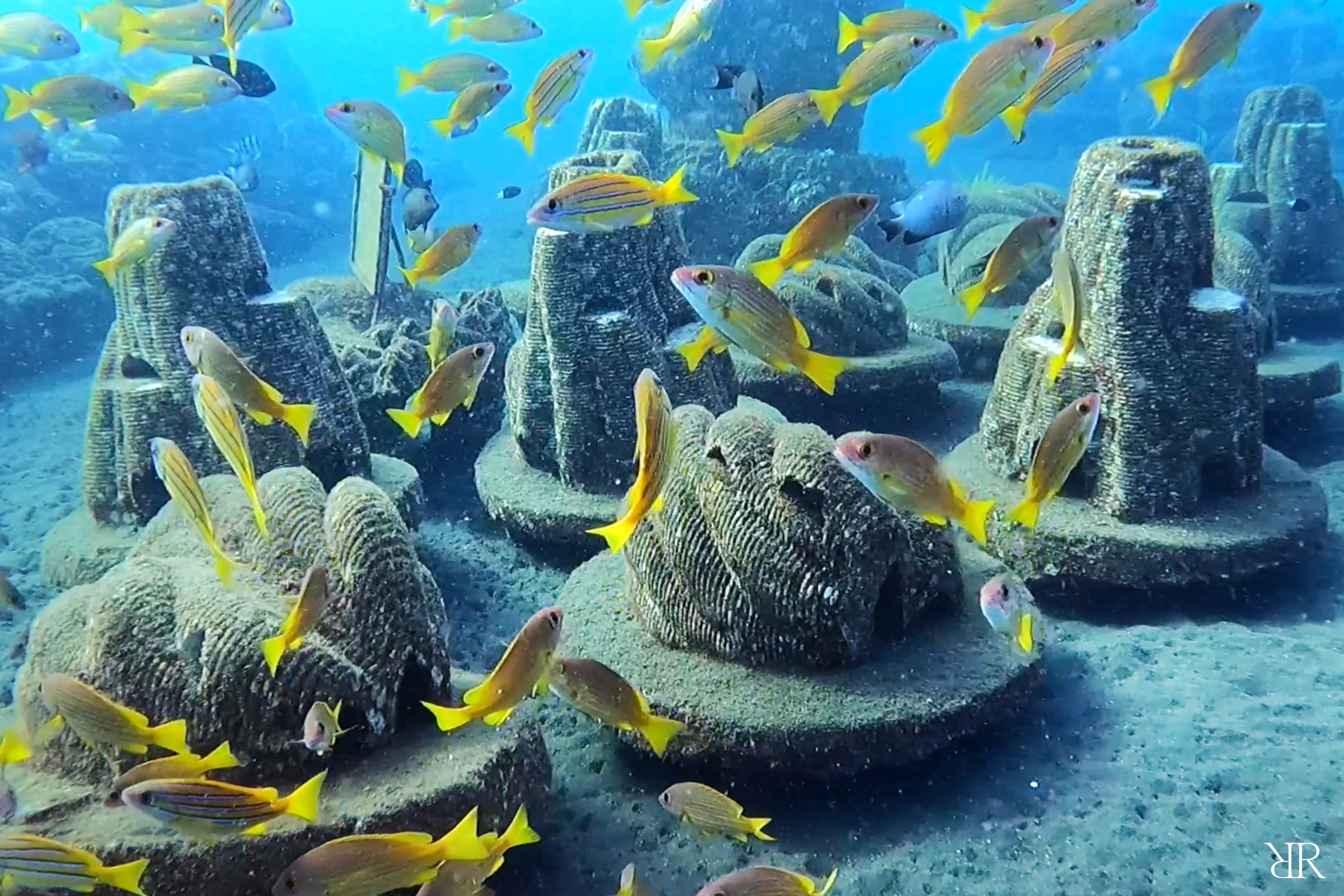
The habitat of the resting reef four months after deployment.

In the most established memorial reefs, such as Neptune Memorial Reef in Florida, a marine study survey estimated that the population numbers of wild sea life went from close to zero to thousands in the space of two years. The survey found spotted eagle rays, damsel fish and puffer fish. Since then the numbers have continued to grow; a survey in 2018 showed the reef supports more than 65 different fish, shrimp and lobster and 75 other species including sponges, and corals.

The Solace Reef in Weymouth Bay, England is seeded with baby lobsters.

== See also ==
- Reef Ball Foundation
- Neptune Memorial Reef
- Burial at sea
- Sea rewilding
