= Johnny McNaught =

Scottish footballer

Personal information
- Full name: John Arthur McNaught
- Date of birth: 1892
- Place of birth: Glasgow, Scotland
- Date of death: 1972
- Place of death: Kilmarnock, Scotland
- Height: 5 ft 7 in (1.70 m)
- Position: Outside right

Youth career
- St Clement's

Senior career*
Years	Team	Apps	(Gls)
–1911	Cambuslang Rangers		
1911–1916	Falkirk	130	(17)
1919	→ Vale of Leven (guest)		
1919	→ St Mirren (guest)	8	(0)
1919–1922	Kilmarnock	93	(6)
1922–1924	Johnstone	64	(9)
1924–1925	Clyde	9	(0)
1925	Johnstone	11	(4)
1925–1926	East Stirlingshire	12	(1)
- * Club domestic league appearances and goals

John Arthur McNaught (1892–1972) was a Scottish footballer who played as an outside right. His longest spells were at Falkirk and Kilmarnock; he won the Scottish Cup with both clubs, being one of few players to win that trophy with two different clubs not including Rangers or Celtic.

== Career ==
Born in Glasgow, McNaught began his career in the Junior grade. He represented Scotland at that level in 1911 while playing for Cambuslang Rangers, where he won the Glasgow Junior League and his teammates included future Liverpool goalkeeper Kenny Campbell.

In the summer of 1911 he signed for Falkirk as a replacement for Jock Simpson who had moved to Blackburn Rovers; at the time, the Brockville Park outfit were one of the top clubs in Scotland having finished runners-up in the Scottish Football League in 1909–10 and third in 1910–11. With the Bairns, McNaught lifted the Scottish Cup after a 2–0 win over Raith Rovers in the 1913 final at Celtic Park. It was the club's first major honour. Falkirk also won several minor regional trophies during the period but never finished higher than fifth until McNaught made his last appearance at the end of the 1915–16 season, with World War I well underway (the Cup was cancelled during the conflict, however the League continued). In 1919, while still registered with Falkirk, he spent short spells with Vale of Leven and St Mirren (playing no part in the Paisley club's run to the 1919 Victory Cup).

With the war at an end, McNaught signed for Kilmarnock, finding success in his first season with the Ayrshire side as they won the 1919–20 Scottish Cup, defeating Albion Rovers 3–2 at Hampden Park. Like Falkirk, it was Killie's maiden victory in the competition, at the 42nd attempt. However, their performances in the league were mediocre during his three campaigns at Rugby Park (8th, 11th and 17th).

Now in his 30s, in 1922 he moved to second tier Johnstone, spending two years there before one-year spells at the same level with Clyde and East Stirlingshire.

=== Other player ===
There was another Scottish player in the period named John McNaught who had the same position on the field, and had a spell at Queens Park Rangers between 1908 and 1911, playing in the 1908 FA Charity Shield replay; this is not the same man as described above.
