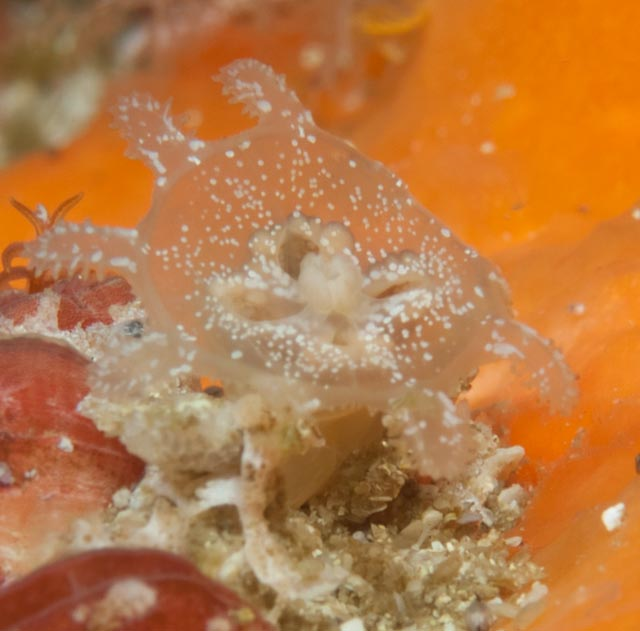
- A Lipkea specimen from South Africa

Scientific classification
- Kingdom: Animalia
- Phylum: Cnidaria
- Class: Staurozoa
- Order: Stauromedusae
- Suborder: Myostaurida
- Family: Lipkeidae; Vogt, 1887
- Genus: Lipkea; Vogt, 1886

Species
- See text

= Lipkea =

Genus of jellyfishes

Lipkea is a genus of stalked jellyfish. It is the only genus in the monotypic family Lipkeidae. Lipkea species lack tentacles at the end of their bell.

== Genera and Species ==
According to the World Register of Marine Species, there are only three described species in this family and genus:

- Lipkea ruspoliana Vogt, 1886
- Lipkea stephensoni Carlgren, 1933
- Lipkea sturdzi (Antipa, 1893)

== Distribution ==
According to the World Register of Marine Species L. stephensoni is the only species known from the waters off the coast of South Africa. The other Lipkea species (Lipkea ruspoliana and Lipkea sturdzi) are found in the mediterranean sea. It is likely that there are undescribed specimens of Lipkea. For instance the images in the gallery below show Lipkea with dense nematocyst clusters (white spots) distributed throughout the oral surface, which are not characteristic of previous descriptions for the three described Lipkea.

== Gallery ==
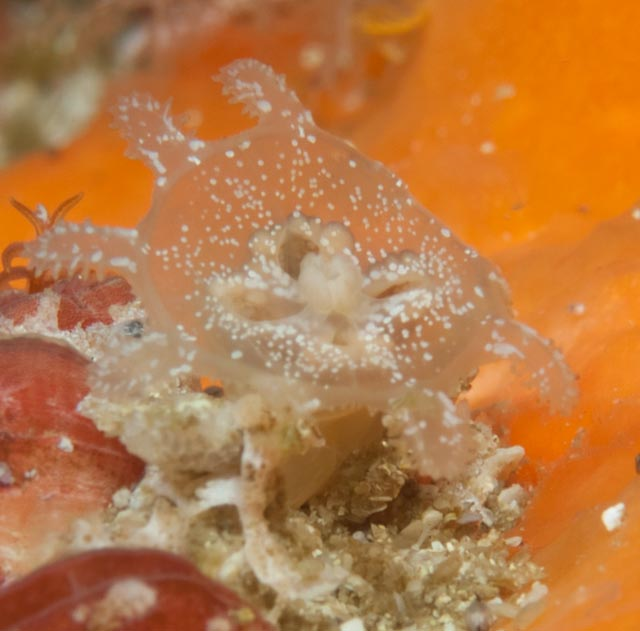
A Lipkea specimen with dense nematocyst clusters

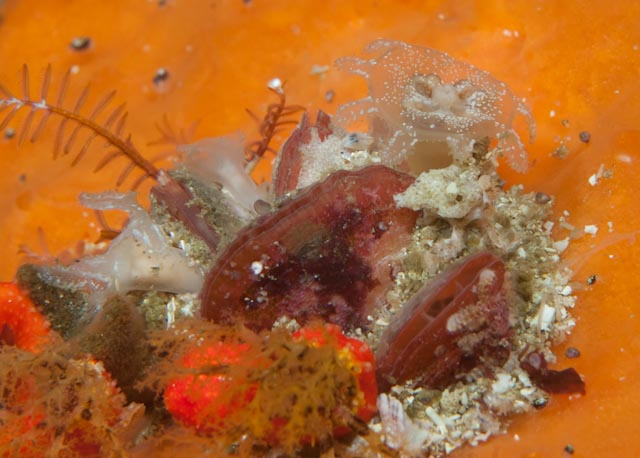
A cluster of Lipkea
