= Harry Anderson (Scottish footballer) =

Scottish footballer

Personal information
- Full name: Henry Alexander Anderson
- Date of birth: 17 July 1888
- Place of birth: Glasgow, Scotland
- Date of death: 8 November 1939 (aged 51)
- Place of death: Glasgow, Scotland
- Position: Left half

Senior career*
Years	Team	Apps	(Gls)
- Vale of Clyde
1909–1910	Third Lanark	0	(0)
1910–1912	Hibernian	43	(12)
1912–1920	Raith Rovers	140	(10)
1915–1916	→ Third Lanark (loan)	35	(2)
1919	→ St Mirren (loan)	5	(0)
1920–1921	St Mirren	27	(2)
1921–1922	Clydebank	29	(1)
Total		279	(27)

International career
1914	Scotland	1	(0)
- * Club domestic league appearances and goals

Henry Alexander Anderson (17 July 1888 –8 November 1939) was a Scottish footballer, perhaps best known for his time at Raith Rovers. He also played for the Scotland national team.

Born in Dennistoun, Anderson made his senior debut at Hibernian as an inside forward before joining Raith Rovers in the summer of 1912. He was part of the team that reached the Scottish Cup final in 1913, which Raith lost to Falkirk. Anderson earned a Scotland cap the following year in a goalless draw with Wales.

During World War I (in which he served in the Royal Field Artillery and was promoted to Corporal), he moved to St Mirren, initially on loan, and won a Victory Cup winner's medal with the Paisley club in 1919. He ended his career with Clydebank and retired in 1922.

His elder brother David was also a footballer whose clubs included Hibernian and Third Lanark; the siblings played together with both clubs (for two seasons with Hibs and in a handful of matches with Thirds in 1915).
