= Lipkea ruspoliana =

Scientific classification
- Kingdom: Animalia
- Phylum: Cnidaria
- Class: Staurozoa
- Order: Stauromedusae
- Family: Lipkeidae
- Genus: Lipkea
- Species: L. ruspoliana

Binomial name
- Lipkea ruspoliana Vogt, 1886

Species of jellyfish

Lipkea ruspoliana is a species of stalked jellyfish. Lipkea species lack tentacles at the end of their bell.
