= James Gibson (footballer, born 1889) =

Scottish footballer

Personal information
- Full name: James Burton Gibson
- Date of birth: 24 June 1889
- Place of birth: Kirkcaldy, Scotland
- Date of death: 5 September 1915 (aged 26)
- Place of death: HMHS Salta, off Gallipoli, Ottoman Turkey
- Height: 5 ft 10 in (1.78 m)
- Position: Half back

Senior career*
Years	Team	Apps	(Gls)
- St Andrews University
1912–1913	Raith Rovers	17	(2)
- * Club domestic league appearances and goals

James Burton Gibson (24 June 1889 – 5 September 1915) was a Scottish professional footballer who played in the Scottish League for Raith Rovers as a half back.

== Personal life ==
Gibson was educated at the University of St Andrews, where he played for the football team and graduated with an M.A. Prior to the First World War, he emigrated to New Zealand and became a teacher at Napier Boys' High School. On 18 January 1915, six months after the outbreak of the First World War, Gibson enlisted as a private in the Auckland Infantry Battalion of the New Zealand Expeditionary Force. On 4 September 1915, whilst fighting in the Gallipoli campaign, Gibson was wounded in the ribs and chest by shrapnel and was evacuated to the hospital ship HMHS Salta. He died of wounds the following day and was buried at sea on 6 September. He is commemorated on the Lone Pine Memorial and was posthumously awarded the 1914–15 Star, the British War Medal and the Victory Medal.
