= Robert Orrock =

Scottish footballer

Personal information
- Full name: Robert Abbie Orrock
- Date of birth: 25 May 1885
- Place of birth: Kinghorn, Scotland
- Date of death: 1969 (aged 83–84)
- Place of death: Coatbridge, Scotland
- Height: 5 ft 6 in (1.68 m)
- Position: Defender

Youth career
- Kinghorn Thistle

Senior career*
| Years | Team | Apps | (Gls) |
- Forth Rangers
| 1906–1908 | East Stirlingshire | 41 | (4) |
| 1908–1917 | Falkirk | 195 | (1) |
| 1917–1919 | St Mirren | 37 | (0) |
| 1919–1923 | Alloa Athletic | 65 | (0) |
| 1919–1920 | → East Stirlingshire (loan) | 0 | (0) |
| 1923–1925 | East Stirlingshire | 37 | (0) |
| Total | | 375 | (5) |

International career
| 1913 | Scotland | 1 | (0) |
- * Club domestic league appearances and goals

Robert Abbie Orrock (25 May 1885 – 1969) was a Scottish footballer who played as a defender.

== Career ==
Born in Kinghorn, Fife, Orrock played club football for East Stirlingshire (two spells), Falkirk, St Mirren and Alloa Athletic. He won the Scottish Cup with Falkirk in 1913 during a nine-year spell at the club, and made one appearance for Scotland in 1913; a decade later he was a guest member of Third Lanark'a squad which toured South America.
