= John Browning (footballer, born 1915) =

Scottish footballer

Personal information
- Date of birth: 27 January 1915
- Place of birth: Alexandria, Scotland
- Date of death: 14 August 1971 (aged 56)
- Place of death: Alexandria, Scotland
- Position: Left half

Senior career*
| Years | Team | Apps | (Gls) |
| 1931–1932 | Bridgeton Waverley | | |
| 1932–1934 | Dunoon Athletic | | |
| 1934–1939 | Liverpool | 19 | (0) |
| 1939–1945 | Gillingham | 0 | (0) |
| 1945–1947 | Cowdenbeath | 7 | (1) |

Managerial career
- 1947–19??: LVV Sparta
- * Club domestic league appearances and goals

John Browning (27 January 1915 – 14 August 1971) was a Scottish footballer who played as a wing half for Liverpool and Cowdenbeath. During his spell at Anfield, he was unable to displace the long-serving Jimmy McDougall from his preferred position, making only 19 appearances across five seasons. He moved to Gillingham, but before playing for them, his career was interrupted by the onset of World War II, during which he appeared for Dumbarton, Albion Rovers and Cowdenbeath, staying with the Fife club after the conflict ended.

His father, of the same name, was also a footballer, winning Scottish league titles with Celtic and also appearing for Dumbarton.
