= Stephen McDonald (footballer) =

Scottish footballer

Personal information
- Date of birth: 1884
- Place of birth: Dundee, Scotland
- Date of death: 1964 (aged 79–80)
- Place of death: Dundee, Scotland
- Height: 5 ft 11 in (1.80 m)
- Position: Right half

Senior career*
Years	Team	Apps	(Gls)
–	Dundee North End		
1906–1908	Dundee	13	(0)
1907	→ Brechin City (loan)		
1908–1909	Aston Villa	0	(0)
1909–1917	Falkirk	222	(6)
- * Club domestic league appearances and goals

Stephen McDonald (1884 – 1964) was a Scottish footballer who played as a right half, primarily for Falkirk with whom he won the Scottish Cup in 1913. Earlier in his career he had played for Dundee and been on the books at Aston Villa, but never made a first-team appearance for the Birmingham club.

The closest he came to any representative honours was an appearance in a Scottish Football League XI trial in 1910.
