= Alec Logan =

Scottish footballer (1882–1918)

Personal information
- Full name: Alexander Logan
- Date of birth: 1882
- Place of birth: Barrhead, Scotland
- Date of death: 10 October 1918 (aged 35–36)
- Place of death: Cambrai, France
- Position: Forward

Senior career*
Years	Team	Apps	(Gls)
–1902	Barrhead Fereneze		
1902–1906	Hibernian	2	(0)
1903	→ Airdrieonians (loan)		
1903–1905	→ Arthurlie (loan)	34	(18)
1906–1907	Falkirk	25	(14)
1907–1909	Aston Villa	24	(11)
1909–1910	Falkirk	45	(22)
1910–1912	Bristol City	37	(9)
1912–1913	Kilmarnock	23	(6)
1913–1914	Partick Thistle		

International career
1907–1910	Scottish League XI	2	(1)
- * Club domestic league appearances and goals

Alexander Logan (1882 – 10 October 1918) was a Scottish footballer, who played for clubs including Hibernian, Aston Villa, Falkirk (two spells), Bristol City, and Kilmarnock.

== Career ==
Born in Barrhead, Logan began his senior career with local club Barrhead Fereneze before signing for Hibernian, one of the leading clubs in Scotland, in 1902. He was a member of the squad which won the 1902–03 Scottish Division One championship title, although he only featured in two league matches and had been loaned to Airdrieonians in January 1903 until the end of the campaign; the Lanarkshire club won the lower division and gained promotion, but the extent of his involvement is uncertain.

He went out on loan again for the next two seasons to hometown club Arthurlie, also of the second tier. He remained with Hibernian for 1905–06 but did not appear in any competitive fixtures for the Leith side and moved on permanently to Falkirk in summer 1906. His form at the Brockville Park club took an immediate upturn (14 goals in 25 league matches) which was such that he came into contention for international selection, and after less than a full season with the Bairns before he was signed by top English club Aston Villa, where his younger brother James had already been playing in the defence for two years.

Logan was involved for two and a half seasons at Villa Park (the club finished runners-up in 1907–08) but despite a decent scoring record he was unable to secure a regular place in the team, and returned to Falkirk in the summer of 1909. Once again, he performed well for the club and in 1909–10 they missed out on the Scottish League title by two points (meanwhile in England his former club Aston Villa and brother James did win the championship).

Falkirk then signed another younger Logan brother, Tommy, although the siblings were teammates only for a matter of months before Alec's form again attracted the attention of English clubs, this time moving to Bristol City in December 1910. The club suffered relegation from the top tier at the end of his first season, and midway through the second he transferred back to Scotland with Kilmarnock. After a year in Ayrshire, he again moved on during the winter, this time to Partick Thistle.

=== International ===
Logan was never selected for the full Scotland team. He represented the Scottish Football League XI twice: a goalless draw against the English League at Ibrox Park in March 1907 (Note: Several sources attribute the 1907 Scottish League appearance to Alec Logan's brother Tommy, but this is extremely unlikely as he was a teenager with no top level experience at the time of the fixture in question; by contrast, Alec was an established forward at Falkirk and it can be assumed that he was the player involved, with records of 'Logan, Falkirk' being linked to Tommy in error after he became a prominent member of the same team within a few years.) and a 3–1 win over the Irish League, in which he scored, in October 1910 at Belfast. The call-ups came during each of his brief but effective spells at Falkirk.

== Wartime and death ==
The outbreak of World War I ended Logan's professional football career aged 32. His military service included time with the Queen's Own Cameron Highlanders for whose regimental football team he was selected in November 1914. He was serving with the 2nd Battalion Argyll and Sutherland Highlanders when he died of wounds at No. 30 Casualty Clearing Station on 10 October 1918 during the Second Battle of Cambrai.

== Honours ==
Aston Villa

- Football League First Division: Runner-up 1907–08

Falkirk

- Scottish Football League: Runner-up 1909–10
