= George Stone (footballer) =

English footballer (1894–1940)

Personal information
- Full name: John George Stone
- Date of birth: 27 July 1894
- Place of birth: Bovingdon, England
- Date of death: 1940 (aged 42–43)
- Position: Winger

Senior career*
Years	Team	Apps	(Gls)
1924–1925	Hemel Hempstead		
1925–1927	Chelsea	25	(2)
1927–1928	Watford	0	(0)
Total		25	(2)
- * Club domestic league appearances and goals

John George Stone (27 July 1894 – 1940) was an English footballer who played in the Football League for Chelsea.
