= Tommy Mitchell (footballer) =

English footballer

Personal information
- Full name: Thomas Mitchell
- Date of birth: 27 June 1905
- Place of birth: Trimdon Grange, England
- Date of death: 1970 (aged 64–65)
- Position: Winger

Senior career*
Years	Team	Apps	(Gls)
1921–1922	Trimdon Grange		
1922–1924	Hartlepools United	35	(1)
1924–1926	Stockport County	66	(13)
1926–1929	Blackburn Rovers	73	(27)
1929–1930	Lincoln City	3	(0)
1930	Horden Colliery Welfare		
Total		177	(41)
- * Club domestic league appearances and goals

Thomas Mitchell (27 June 1905 – 1970) was an English footballer who played in the Football League for Blackburn Rovers, Hartlepools United, Lincoln City and Stockport County.
