= Bob Turnbull =

Scottish footballer (1894–1946)

Personal information
- Full name: Robert Hamilton Turnbull
- Date of birth: 22 June 1894
- Place of birth: Dumbarton, Scotland
- Date of death: 1946 (aged 51–52)
- Height: 5 ft 8 in (1.73 m)
- Positions: Centre forward; left back

Senior career*
Years	Team	Apps	(Gls)
1921–1924	Arsenal	59	(26)
1924–1925	Charlton Athletic	6	(2)
1925–1928	Chelsea	80	(51)
1928–1929	Clapton Orient	39	(18)
1929–1930	Southend United	2	(0)
1930–1931	Chatham Town		
1931–1932	Crystal Palace	2	(0)
Total		188	(97)
- * Club domestic league appearances and goals

Robert Hamilton Turnbull (22 June 1894 – 1946) was a Scottish footballer.

Turnbull was originally a soldier, serving in the Royal Corps of Signals, and joined Arsenal in 1921 as an amateur. He was originally a left back and made his debut on 27 December 1921 against Cardiff City at Ninian Park; Arsenal lost 3–4 in a tightly fought game. Turnbull only played occasionally at this stage, making only five appearances in the 1921–22 season.

The following season he played a little more regularly, featuring in eight of the Gunners' first fifteen matches. At this point in time, mid-November, Arsenal were bottom of the table, having only won four matches. With Arsenal's regular centre forward Henry White out of form and no money available to buy a replacement, Arsenal manager Leslie Knighton switched Turnbull from defence to attack, and the gamble paid off; Turnbull scored 21 league goals that season, including two four-goal hauls against Bolton Wanderers and Blackpool. Turnbull's goals saved Arsenal from relegation and they eventually finished a comfortable 11th. An additional goal in the FA Cup against Liverpool brought Turnbull's total for the season to 22, which was then a top-flight record for an Arsenal player.

However, his blistering form could not last, and he only scored six goals in 1923–24. The arrival of Harry Woods forced Turnbull out of the side altogether and he was sold to Charlton Athletic in November 1924; in all he had scored 28 goals in 66 matches for Arsenal. After just three months at The Valley, he was sold on to Chelsea, where he rediscovered his form: in less than three seasons he scored 58 goals in 87 first-team games.

After leaving Chelsea in 1928 he had brief spells at Clapton Orient, Southend United and Crystal Palace. After retiring, he stayed on with Palace as a trainer, until his death in 1946 aged 52.
