= Harry Goodwin (footballer) =

Scottish footballer (1903–1989)

Personal information
- Full name: Henry Bird Goodwin
- Date of birth: 4 December 1903
- Place of birth: Glasgow, Scotland
- Date of death: 1989 (aged 85–86)
- Position: Winger

Senior career*
Years	Team	Apps	(Gls)
1923–1924	Glasgow Benburb		
1924	Shawfield		
1924–1925	Bo'ness		
1925–1927	Portsmouth	38	(10)
1927–1930	Reading	89	(13)
1930–1931	Dolphin		
1931–1932	Colwyn Bay		
1932–1933	Worcester City		
1934–1935	Glentoran		
Total		127	(23)
- * Club domestic league appearances and goals

Henry Bird Goodwin (4 December 1903 – 1989) was a Scottish footballer who played in the Football League for Portsmouth and Reading.
