= Tommy Logan =

Scottish footballer (1888–1962)

Personal information
- Full name: Thomas Logan
- Date of birth: 17 August 1888
- Place of birth: Barrhead, Scotland
- Date of death: 21 June 1962 (aged 73)
- Place of death: Lochranza, Scotland
- Height: 5 ft 11 in (1.80 m)
- Position: Centre half

Senior career*
Years	Team	Apps	(Gls)
1908–1910	Arthurlie	27	(7)
1910–1913	Falkirk	95	(29)
1913–1922	Chelsea	107	(7)
1916	→ Partick Thistle (guest)	1	(1)
1916	→ Dunfermline Athletic (guest)		
1917–1918	→ Falkirk (guest)	4	(0)
1922–1923	Arthurlie	0	(0)

International career
1913	Scotland	1	(0)
- * Club domestic league appearances and goals

Thomas Logan (17 August 1888 – 21 June 1962) was a Scottish footballer, who played for Falkirk and Chelsea.

== Career ==
Born in Barrhead, Logan began his senior career with local club Arthurlie of Scotland's second tier in 1908, moving to Falkirk, at that time one of the top teams in the country, in 1910, following a trial. During the initial months of his first season at Brockville Park (in which the club eventually finished in third place), his elder brother Alec was a teammate prior to a transfer to England; another older sibling James was also a professional footballer who played in England, becoming an opponent after he moved back home in 1912 to play with Rangers.

With the Bairns, Logan lifted the Scottish Cup after a 2–0 win over Raith Rovers in the 1913 final at Celtic Park, scoring the second goal; it was the club's first major honour, and he joined Chelsea within a few weeks. a year later he was joined at Stamford Bridge by another member of that Falkirk team, Jimmy Croal.

Logan was a member of the Chelsea side that reached the 1915 FA Cup Final. He was one of the few Chelsea players to get a positive mention in the Manchester Guardian report on the final for a few "dashing excursions" into the Sheffield half, he failed to score. By then, he was judged to be "an ideal centre half who showed judgement in his play", although in his early years he had been considered a forward and had a good scoring ratio for Falkirk. He was playing further back when capped by Scotland.

Logan's career was interrupted by World War I, during which he had loan spells back in Scotland (where the domestic league continued, unlike in England) with Partick Thistle, Dunfermline Athletic and back at Falkirk. His military service included the Argyll and Sutherland Highlanders whose regimental team he represented.

He was contracted to Chelsea until July 1922 (although his last appearance for the club was in November 1920) and made a total of 116 appearances scoring 8 goals in total. In his mid-30s, he returned to Arthurlie, then playing in the Western League – a wartime competition which continued for several years due to the slow reorganisation of lower league football in Scotland.

Logan represented Scotland once, appearing in a 1913 British Home Championship match against Ireland while with Falkirk. (Note: Tommy Logan is credited in several sources as having been selected for the Scottish League XI in 1907, but this is extremely unlikely as he was a teenager with no top level experience at the time of the fixture in question; by contrast, his older brother Alec Logan was an established forward at Falkirk and it can be assumed that Alec was the player involved, with records of 'Logan, Falkirk' being linked to Tommy after he became a prominent member of the same team within a few years.)

== Honours ==
Falkirk

- Scottish Cup: 1912–13

Chelsea

- FA Cup runner-up: 1914–15
