= Fred Bedford =

English footballer

Personal information
- Date of birth: 25 June 1902
- Place of birth: Blackburn, England
- Date of death: 18 January 1972 (aged 69)
- Place of death: Morecambe, England
- Position: Outside right

Senior career*
Years	Team	Apps	(Gls)
–1927	Lancaster Town		
1927–1928	Tranmere Rovers	3	(2)
1928	Morecambe		
1928–1929	Bradford City	9	(8)
1929–	Morecambe		
Total		12	(10)
- * Club domestic league appearances and goals

Fred Bedford (25 June 1902 – 18 January 1972) was an English professional footballer who played as an outside right for Lancaster Town, Tranmere Rovers and Morecambe. He also played for Bradford City, signing for them in October 1928 from Morecambe; he returned to Morecambe in August 1929. He scored 8 goals in 9 appearances in the Football League for Bradford City.
