= James McKay (footballer) =

English footballer (1901–1997)

Personal information
- Full name: James Alexander McKay
- Date of birth: 28 March 1901
- Place of birth: London, England
- Date of death: 1997 (aged 95–96)
- Position: Centre forward

Senior career*
Years	Team	Apps	(Gls)
1920–1921	Custom House		
1921–1922	Dartford		
1922–1924	Fulham	17	(5)
1924–1926	Clapton Orient	8	(3)
1926	Aldershot Town		
Total		25	(8)
- * Club domestic league appearances and goals

James Alexander McKay (28 March 1901 – 1997) was an English footballer who played in the Football League for Clapton Orient and Fulham.
