= Burial at sea =

Method of burial

Burial at sea aboard USS Ronald Reagan (30 September 2024) (14:14)
Video of a burial at sea for a naval officer aboard USS Ronald Reagan in September 2024

Burial at sea is the disposal of human remains in the ocean, normally from a ship, boat or aircraft. It is regularly performed by navies, and is done by private citizens in many countries. Burial-at-sea services are conducted at many different locations and with many different customs, either by ship or by aircraft. Usually, either the captain of the ship or aircraft or a religious representative (of the deceased's religion or the state religion) performs the ceremony.

The ceremony may include burial in a casket, burial sewn in sailcloth, burial in an urn, or scattering of the cremated remains from a ship. Burial at sea by aircraft is only done with cremated remains. Other types of burial at sea include the mixing of the ashes with concrete and dropping the concrete block to form an artificial reef such as the Atlantis Reef. Below is a list of religions that allow burial at sea, with some details of the burial.

== By religion ==
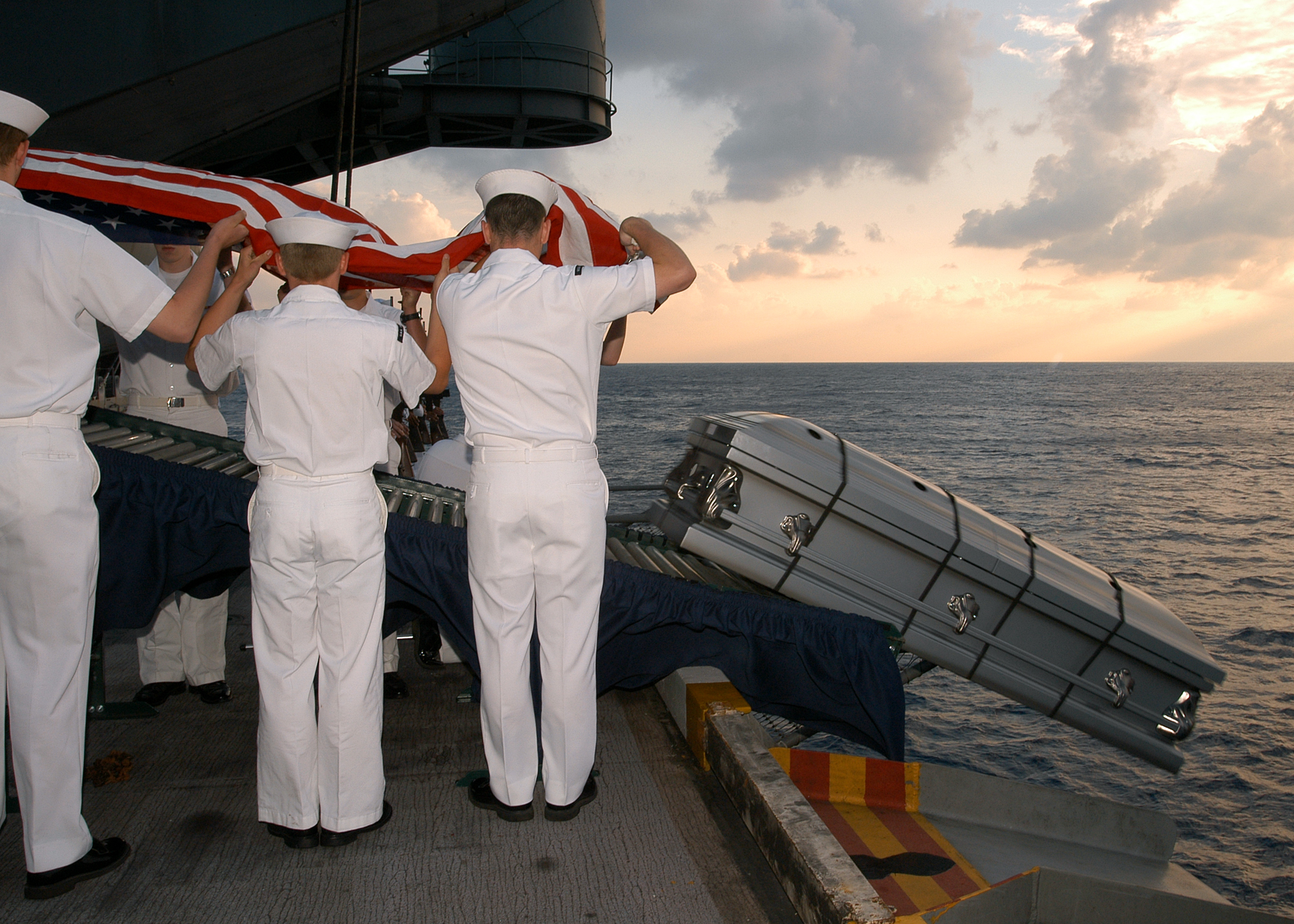
A burial at sea on USS Enterprise, May 19, 2004

=== Christianity ===
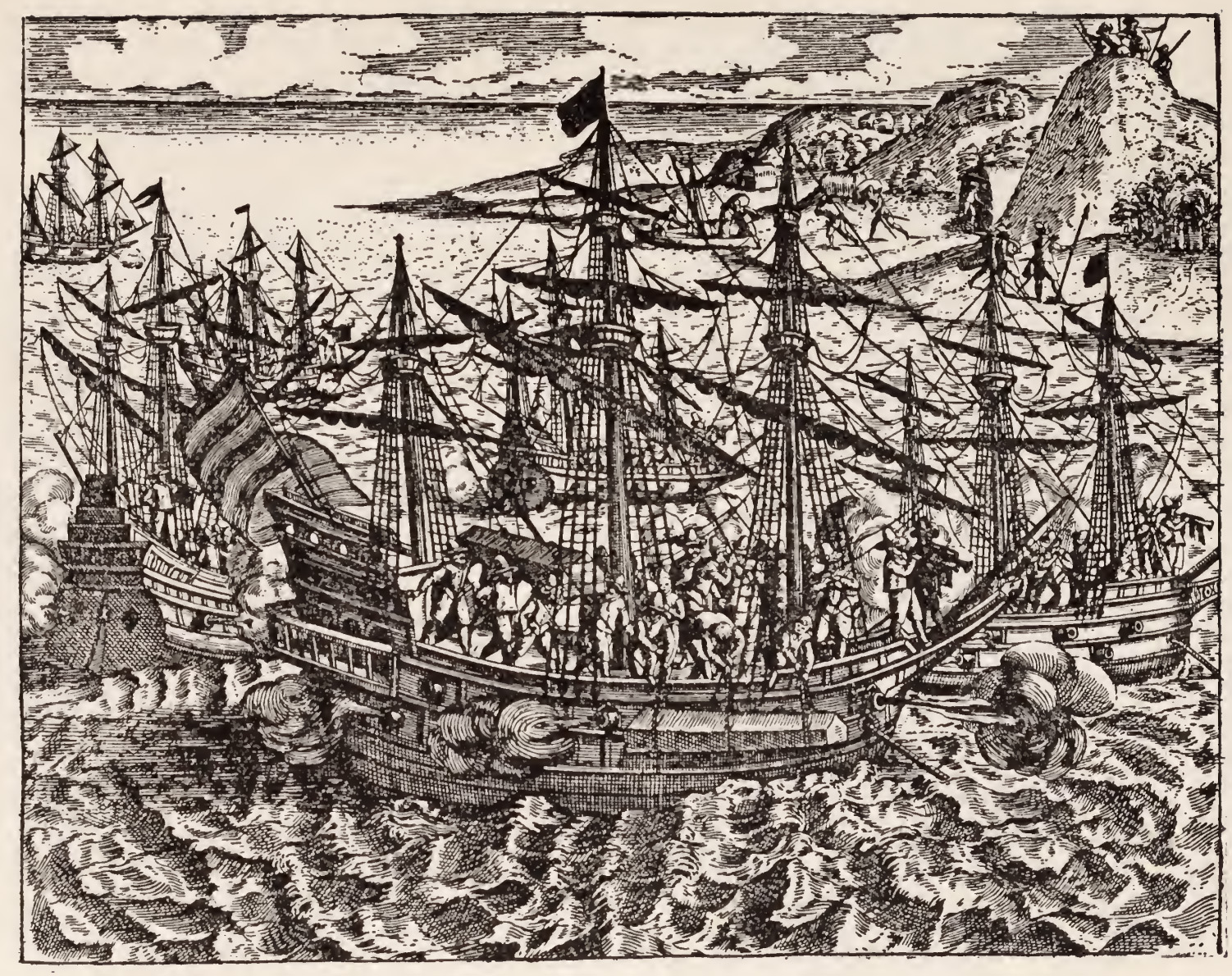
Dutch admiral Jacob Mahu being buried at sea in 1598

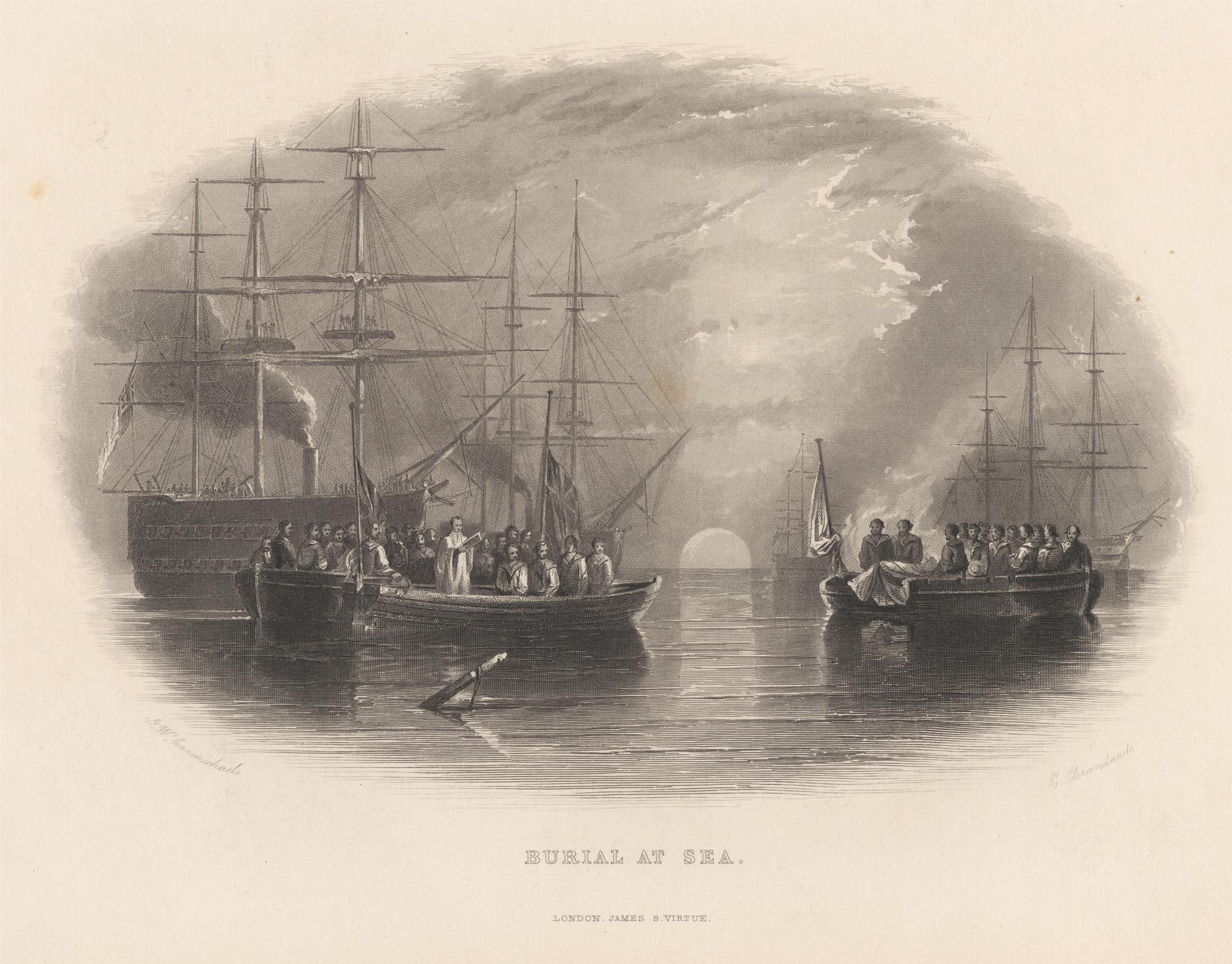
A British serviceman being buried at sea in the Baltic Sea during the Crimean War, 1857

In Christianity, the practice is accepted. It has specific liturgies for burial at sea.

==== Catholicism ====
Officially, the Roman Catholic Church prefers casket burials over cremations, but does allow for burials at sea of whole or cremated remains. The Church defines burial at sea as sinking remains in a worthy container to the sea bottom and final resting place. Burial at sea in a casket or in an urn is acceptable and not prohibited, but viewed as not preferable and should not be commonplace. Cremated remains are subject to the condition that the ashes are entombed in a mausoleum urn niche, columbarium, or buried on land or sea. Catholics believe it is not proper to scatter or pour the cremated remains over the sea, water, or on the land. According to the Roman Catholic Church this action does not give due respect to the remains of the deceased, nor does it allow for the closure, healing of family and friends, and prayers for the deceased. Likewise they see that the custom of housing the remains with family or friends and not placing the deceased in the ground does not offer loved ones a specific and sacred place to visit the deceased's remains. Visiting the deceased in a holy place provides believers with a space to offer prayers, commune with those who have gone before them in faith, and reminds them to await the resurrection of their own bodies. For burials at sea, the committal prayer number 406§4 is used in the funeral liturgy.

==== Orthodox Christianity ====
At Orthodox funerals, there is normally an open casket at the ceremony. At the grave site, there is a short prayer, after which attendants move to place flowers on the casket. A memorial service is typically held on the Sunday closest to the 40th day after death. Cremation is not approved, as bodies are sought to be preserved in burial as much as is feasible, for preparation of the general resurrection of the dead at the Second Advent.

==== Protestantism ====
The Anglican Communion allows for burial at sea. Historically, the body has to be sewn in canvas, and suitably weighted. Today, it is more common for the body to be placed in a body bag or, if coming from ashore, a coffin. The ship is then stopped and a short religious ceremony is performed. Typically, Protestant funeral rites usually include some form of Bible reading, prayers, a sermon and/or hymns. Exact practices vary by denomination. However, some Protestants do not pray for the dead at all as they state that God has already received the deceased.

At the burial of the dead at sea, the same office from the Book of Common Prayer as used for burial on land may be used; only instead of the words:

We therefore commit [his] body to the ground, earth to earth, ... in sure and certain hope of the resurrection of the body

the form of words used is:

We therefore commit [his] body to the deep, ... in sure and certain hope of the resurrection of the body, when the Sea shall give up her dead ...

Anglican, and other, chaplains of the Royal Navy also bury cremated remains of deceased naval personnel at sea. Scattering of cremated remains of those who have served in the Navy is allowed under the direction of the Chaplaincy services in three designated port areas and carries no charge.

Many Lutheran naval veterans and seamen prefer to be buried at sea. In those cases either the casket or urn is set to sea, or ashes scattered. The procedure is similar as that with the Anglican church. Some parishes have specific consecrated sea areas that are designated by a bishop as a sea area where ashes can be sprinkled.

=== Hinduism ===
In traditional Hindu funerary practice, bodies of water serve as the primary place of deposition for human remains, and their shores may also be the location for other parts of the funerary rituals, including the cremation. The deceased are traditionally cremated on a pyre accompanied by a variety of items, including flowers, herbs, oils and holy river water. The cremation serves as a final sacrifice of the body. The soul escapes the confines of the body when the heat of the fire makes the skull crack, and the body is then remade in the ancestral realm. After the fire has burned down, the ashes are collected, and immersed in a sacred river, ideally the Ganges. Death causes a ritual pollution among the attendants of the funeral, who wash themselves in the sacred river after the dispersion of the ashes.

=== Islam ===
The sacred texts of Islam prefer burial on land, "so deep that its smell does not come out and the beasts of prey do not dig it out". However, if a person dies at sea and it is not possible to bring the body back to land before decay, or if burial at land becomes impossible, burial at sea is allowed. A weight is tied to the feet of the body, and the body is lowered into the water. This would preferably occur in an area where the remains are not immediately eaten by scavengers.

In the Sunni Fiqh book Umdat al-Salik wa Uddat al-Nasik, the condition for sea burial is the following:

It is best to bury him (the deceased) in the cemetery ... If someone dies on a ship and it is impossible to bury him on land, the body is placed (O: tightly lashed) between two planks (O: to obviate bloating) and thrown into the sea (O: so that it reaches shore, even if the inhabitants are non-Muslims, since a Muslim might find the body and bury it facing the direction of prayer (qibla)).

=== Judaism ===
According to Jewish law, dead people must be quickly buried, and burial requires covering in earth. This law is derived from Devarim (Deuteronomy) 21:23 "Bury, you will bury him the same day; for the (unburied body) is a curse to God" the double command to bury causing a positive commandment to entomb in the earth and a negative commandment forbidding leaving an unburied body. The legal text Shulchan Aruch brings a case example explaining that even if a person is known to have drowned in a closed body of water such as a small pond where there can be certainty that the victim had not somehow survived, the family does not begin ritual mourning and remains in extended state of most intense mourning aninut until either the body is found or after an exhaustive search despairs of recovering and burying the body. This shows that the body is considered unburied when underwater; as shiva mourning normally only begins after burial. B'resheit (Genesis) 3:19 states "With the sweat of your face you shall eat bread, until you return to the ground, from (dust) you were taken and you are dust, and to dust you will return." From this it has been deduced by rabbis that the only proper treatment of a dead body is physically to cover it with earth once land is available for the crew to bury the body, rather than to leave the body at sea or some other fate such as cremation.

If for some reason a deceased body aboard a ship would cause an immediate life threat to those aboard the vessel, the commandment to protect innocent life (pikuach nefesh) overrides nearly all other commandments, including the command to bury the dead. Any appropriate actions to ensure the safety of surviving crew are required to be taken, which may include jettisoning a body at sea without burial. However, attempts would later be made to recover and bury when possible without life hazard.

An example of the desire to bury a body in the ground, even after it has been long dead at sea, is seen in the case of the Israeli submarine Dakar. The submarine was lost with no survivors in 1968, and its location was not discovered until 1999, when it was found to be lying broken at a depth of 3,000 meters. Search and recovery of any potentially existing remains at this very difficult-to-access depth has not shown results, despite requests from family and the Chief Rabbi of the Israel Defense Forces. In another case, when the skeletons of Holocaust victims were found in a river into which they had been dumped en masse, authorities claimed that many of these martyrs to the Jewish faith would hope to be brought ashore to rest in proper Jewish burials.

== By country ==
=== Australia ===
Burial at sea within Australian territorial waters, exclusive economic zone and continental shelf is covered by the Environment Protection (Sea Dumping) Act 1981 administered by the federal Department of the Environment. A permit is required for burial of bodies at sea. Permits are usually only granted in cases of a strong connection to the sea, such as long-serving navy personnel. The body must not be embalmed or placed in a casket; it may only be sewn into a shroud. The burial must be in water deeper than 2,000 metres (6,600 ft) and not interfere with shipping, fishing or undersea communications. Australian Defence Force vessels engaged in armed conflicts or emergency situations are exempt from these requirements.

No permit is required to scatter ashes at sea.

=== United Kingdom ===
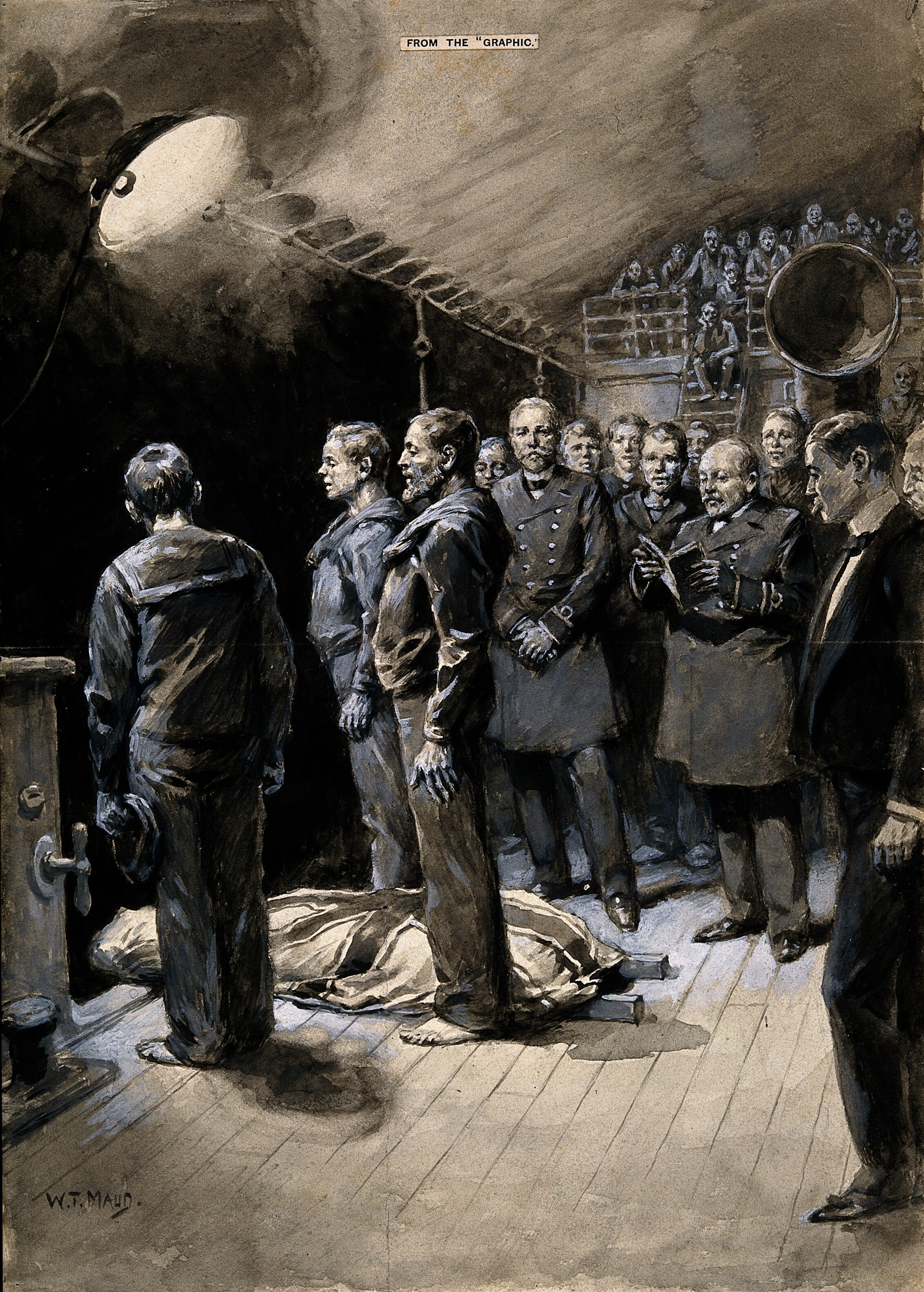
A burial at sea onboard a British ship during the Second Boer War, 1899

British burials at sea of the 18th and 19th centuries involved wrapping the deceased in sailcloth weighted with cannonballs.

In England, cremated remains may be scattered freely at sea but a burial must be made in a coffin meeting regulatory requirements and in one of three locations: off The Needles, Isle of Wight; between Hastings and Newhaven; and off Tynemouth, North Tyneside. Permission may be sought for another burial site. Some funeral directors will arrange the event, such as Britannia Shipping for Burial At Sea. Charity organisation the Maritime Volunteer Service also helps carry out burials at sea.

In Scotland, there are two designated sites for burial at sea. These are 210 miles (340 km) due west of Oban and 15 miles (24 km) west of John O'Groats.

=== United States ===
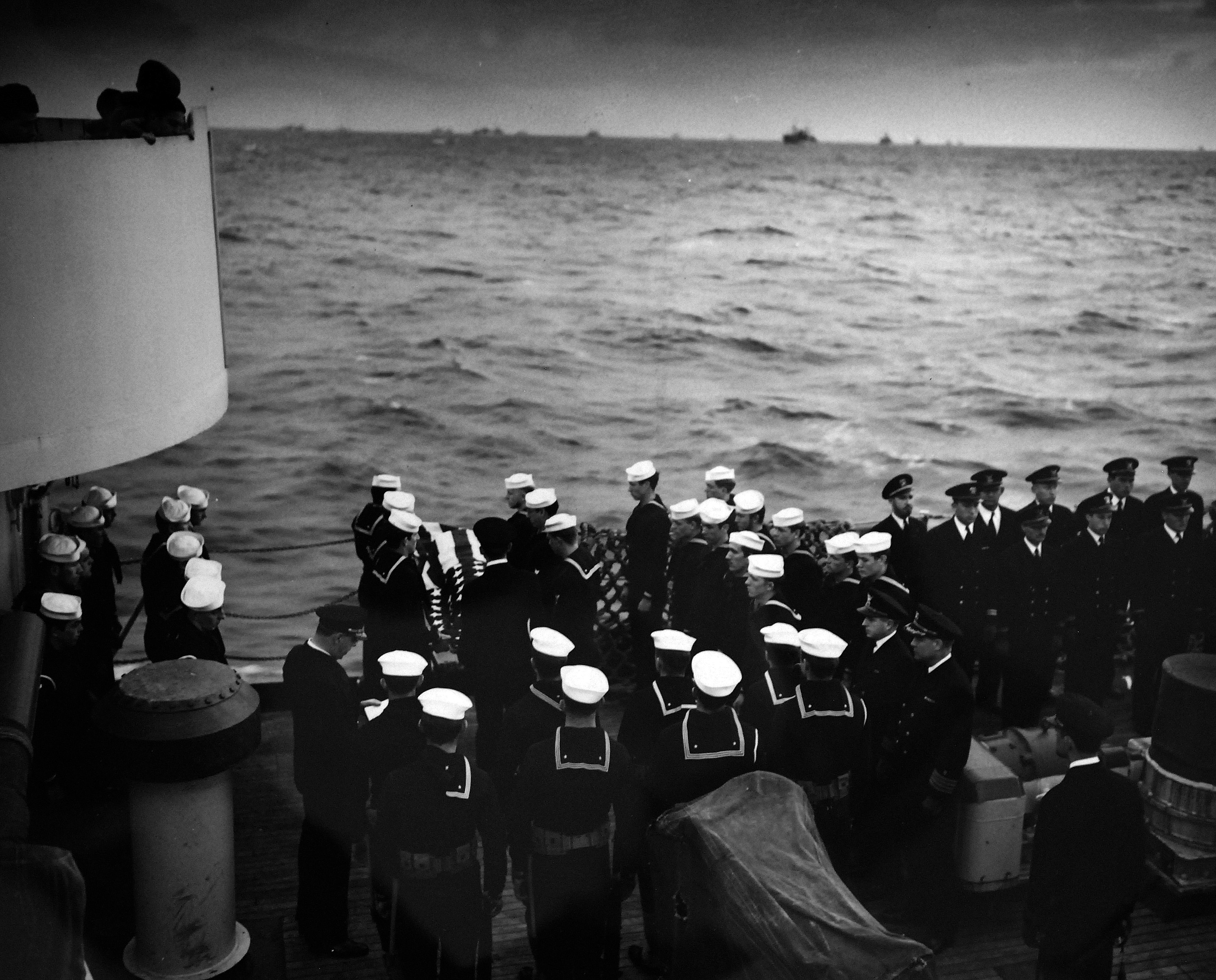
Burial ceremony aboard USCGC Spencer during World War II, 1943

A funeral director is not required for the burial of cremated remains at sea. However, full body burials require specific preparation to ensure the body or coffin sinks quickly, and in many states a licensed funeral director is required. The Environmental Protection Agency regulations for full body burials at sea in the United States require that the site of interment be 3 nautical miles (5.6 km; 3.5 mi) from land and at a depth of at least 600 feet (180 m). In certain areas, specifically east central Florida, the Dry Tortugas, Florida and west of Pensacola, Florida to the Mississippi River Delta, such at-sea burials are only authorized in ocean waters at least 1,800 feet (549 m) deep. In California, a whole body must be buried at least three miles off the coast. Off the eastern coast of the United States, the closest sufficient depths are off Long Island (75 miles/121 km), Ocracoke (20 miles/32 km), and Miami (5 miles/8.0 km). This may require travel in excess of 30 miles (48 km) for a suitable site.

Departing from the New England area requires a voyage of about 45 miles (72 km) to reach the required 600 ft ocean depth. Sufficient depth is within 10 miles (16 km) or less at many harbors along the U.S. west coast, including San Diego, Santa Barbara, Monterey, Fort Bragg, Eureka, and Crescent City, all in California. The United States Navy inters intact remains from Norfolk and San Diego only. The United States Navy requires a metal casket for intact remains, but full-body burial in a suitably weighted shroud is also legal.

The United States is similar to many countries which permit the spreading of cremation ashes within their exclusive economic zone. When spreading ashes from a ship which is registered in a different country, the regulations and reporting procedures for the ship's flag state need to be complied with once the vessel is in international waters, that is, outside 12 nautical miles (22 km). Ships follow the London Convention principles, as opposed to MARPOL regulations, as the ash is intentionally taken on board for discharge at sea, as opposed to ash generated on passage from the ship's incinerators. It should be further considered that on 1 January 2013, MARPOL Annex V came into force, which prevents discharge of a ship's incinerator ash.

==== United States Navy ====
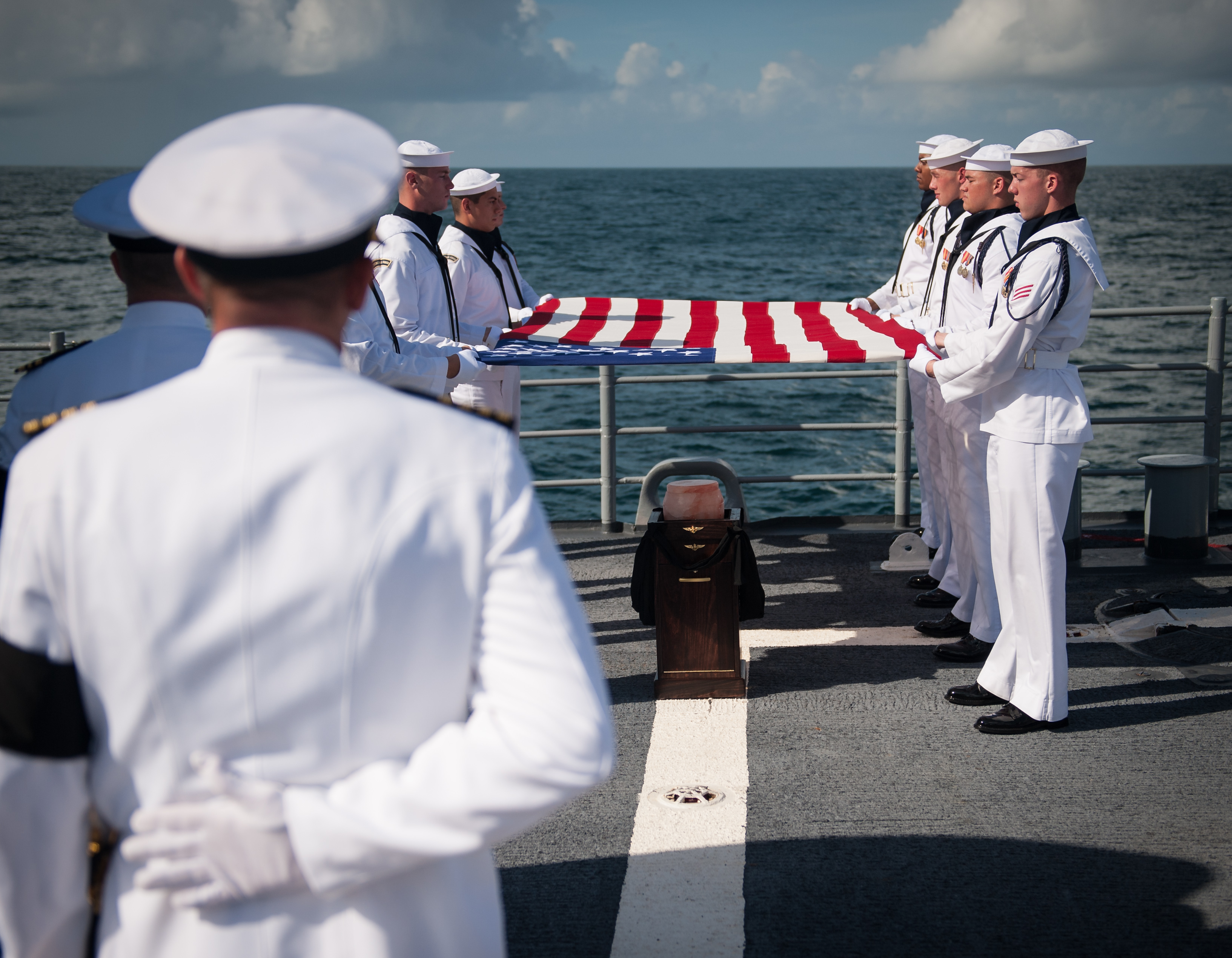
The burial at sea of astronaut Neil Armstrong on USS Philippine Sea in the Atlantic Ocean, September 14, 2012

The United States Navy has performed many burials at sea in its history, with wartime burials as recently as World War II, and peacetime burials still common. Enemy deaths received the same ceremony as Americans or allies. Most other armed forces also perform burials at sea, such as the British Royal Navy and the Royal Canadian Navy.

If the deceased died on land or has been returned to shore after death, the remains may be brought aboard either in a coffin or in an urn after cremation. The ceremony is performed while the ship is deployed, and consequently civilians are not allowed to be present. In the US, people eligible for a Navy burial at sea are:

- Active-duty members of the uniformed services
- Retirees and honorably discharged veterans
- Military Sealift Command US civilian marine personnel
- Dependents of active duty members, retirees, and veterans.

In preparation, the officer of the deck calls All hands bury the dead, and the ship is stopped (if possible). The ship's flags are lowered to half mast. The ship's crew, including a firing party, casket bearers and a bugler, are assembled on the deck. The crew stands at parade rest at the beginning of the ceremony. The coffin is covered with a flag, and is carried feet first on deck by the casket bearers. The casket is placed on a stand, with the feet overboard. In case of cremated remains, the urn is brought on deck and placed on a stand.

The ceremony is divided into a military portion and a religious portion. The religious part is specific to the religion of the deceased, and may be performed by a Navy chaplain, or by the commanding officer if no chaplain of the appropriate faith is available. A scripture is read and prayers are said.

After the religious ceremony, the firing party is ordered "Firing party, present arms". The casket bearers tilt the platform with the casket, so that the casket slides off the platform into the ocean. The flag which was draped over the casket is retained on board. For cremated remains, there is the option to bury the remains using the urn in a similar fashion to the procedure used for caskets. Alternatively, the urn can be opened, and the remains scattered in the wind. In this case, the wind direction has to be taken under consideration before burial to ensure a smooth procedure.

The firing party fires a three volley salute, the bugler plays "Taps", and flowers may also be dropped into the ocean. After the flag is folded, the ceremony ends. The relatives are informed of the time and location of the burial, and given photos and video recordings if available.

== Wartime burial at sea ==
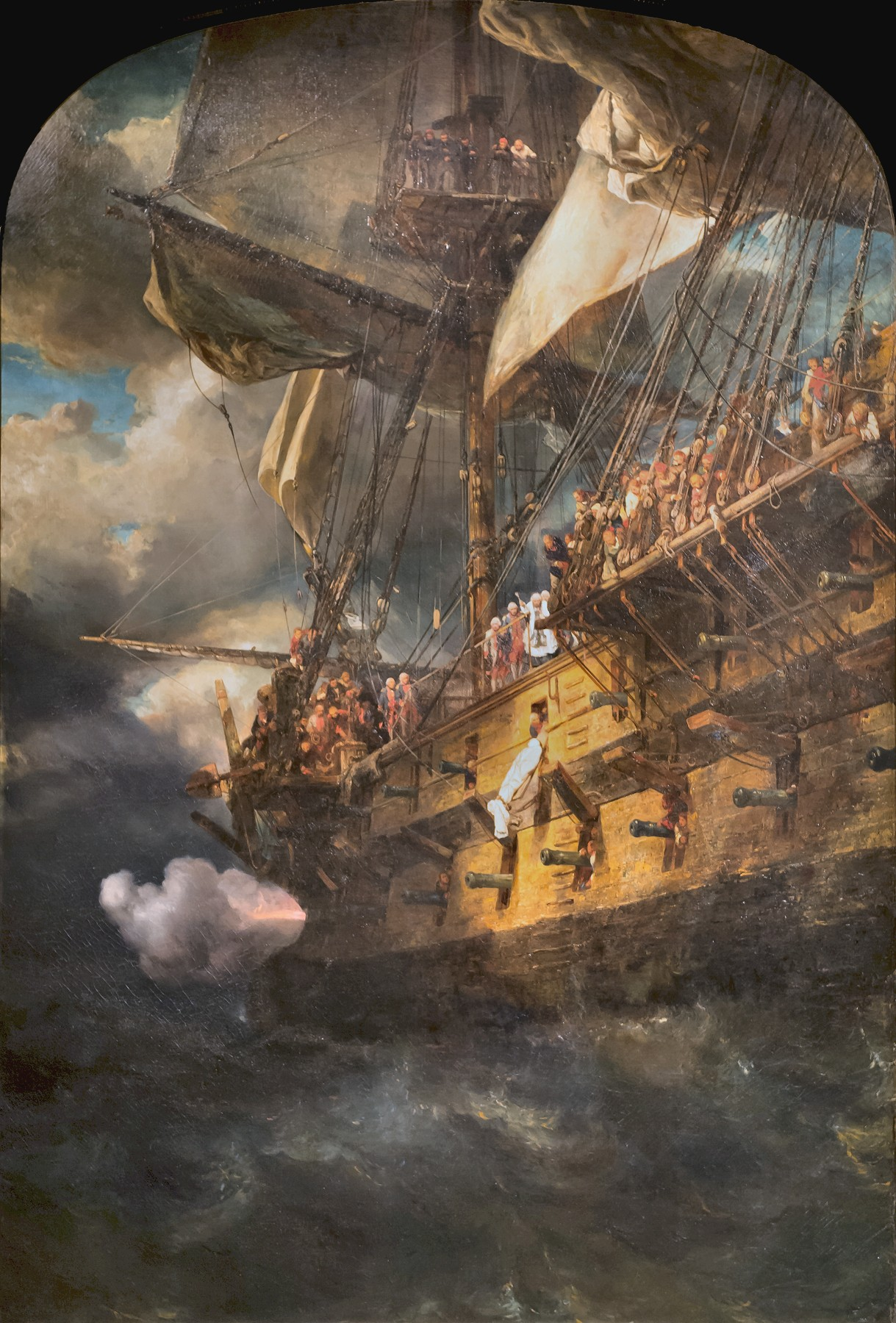
1836 Eugène Isabey painting of a late-18th century French Navy officer being buried at sea

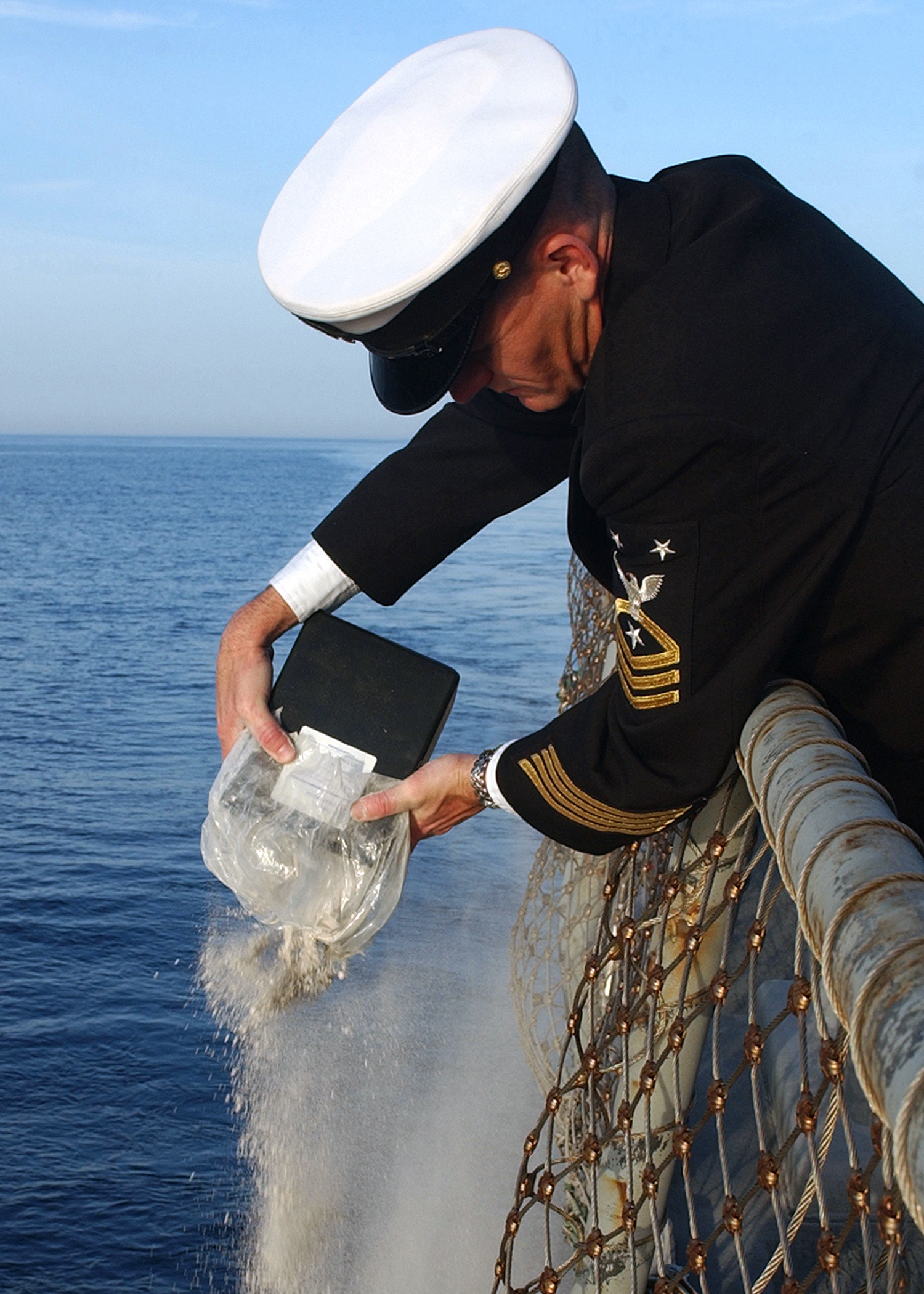
Cremated remains being released into the sea from USS Donald Cook, May 1, 2003

In wartime, attempts are made for burial at sea to follow the same procedure as for peacetime burial at sea, although a ship on a combat mission may not have all the necessary resources available. Nowadays, it is usually possible to airlift the remains back to shore, and prepare a burial ceremony on land. However, as recently as the Falklands War, deceased were buried at sea without returning to land. Due to the limited facilities of military ships, this procedure usually does not include a casket, but the body is sewn into a sailcloth with weights, usually rocks or cannonballs. Cremation is usually not possible on a ship. During the Pacific campaign there was at least one instance where a member of an aircrew was buried at sea in his damaged aircraft, which was ceremonially pushed overboard from an aircraft carrier.

== Memorial services at sea ==
If no remains of the deceased are available a memorial service may be held, and flowers may be dropped in the water, often over or near the location of the death.

== People buried at sea ==
A few notable burials at sea:

- Sir Francis Drake (1540–1596), body in lead coffin off the coast of Portobelo, Panama
- Christopher Newport (1561–1617), body buried in the Indian Ocean
- Edward Winslow (1595–1655), buried at sea near Jamaica on 8 May 1655
- Mariano Moreno (1778–1811), one of the leaders of the Argentine May Revolution; died on a schooner taking him to exile in Europe; his coffin was wrapped in a Union Jack.
- Friedrich Engels (1820–1895), cremated ashes were scattered off Beachy Head, near Eastbourne England.
- Numerous RMS Titanic victims (1912), picked up by rescue ships, whose remains were too damaged to preserve or for whom the rescuers lacked sufficient embalming materials, were buried at sea.
  - The ashes of Titanic's fourth officer, Joseph Boxhall, were scattered at sea following his death, aged 83, in 1967, at 41°46N 50°14W, the position he had calculated for the ship on the night of the sinking.
- Surya Sen (1894–1934), was given a burial at sea in the Bay of Bengal
- Dudley Pound (1877–1943), cremated ashes scattered
- Atholl MacGregor (1883–1945), Hong Kong's chief justice, died on hospital ship from Hong Kong for England
- H. G. Wells (1866–1946), cremated and ashes scattered in the sea off England
- Edwina Mountbatten, Countess Mountbatten of Burma (1901–1960), was buried at sea from HMS Wakeful off the coast of Portsmouth.
- Adolf Eichmann (1906–1962), following his execution in Israel, his body was cremated and his ashes scattered at sea over the Mediterranean, in international waters. This was done because Israel did not want such a person buried in its soil, and also did not want a grave elsewhere that might have become a place of pilgrimage for other Nazis.
- Andrew Cunningham, 1st Viscount Cunningham of Hyndhope (1883–1963), prominent admiral of the Royal Navy during World War II. Buried at sea near Portsmouth.
- Janis Joplin (1943–1970), cremated at Westwood Village Memorial Park Cemetery, and ashes scattered into the Pacific Ocean
- Maria Callas (1923–1977), cremated at the Père Lachaise Cemetery in Paris; ashes were interred there, stolen, recovered and finally scattered, according to her wish, into the Aegean Sea in Greece on June 3, 1979
- Richard Rodgers (1902–1979), cremated ashes scattered
- Sir Alfred Hitchcock (1899–1980), ashes were scattered into the Pacific Ocean
- Steve McQueen (1930–1980), cremated and ashes scattered in the Pacific Ocean
- Dennis Wilson (1944–1983), body buried in the Pacific Ocean off California with special intervention by President Reagan
- Peter Lawford (1923–1984), actor, cremated and ashes originally buried at Westwood Village Memorial Park Cemetery; they were later removed and scattered in the Pacific Ocean
- Rock Hudson (1925–1985), cremated ashes scattered
- Robert A. Heinlein (1907–1988), cremated, and ashes scattered in the Pacific Ocean
- John Carradine (1906–1988), full body burial into the Pacific Ocean near Santa Catalina Island (California) by his family
- Stan Getz (1927–1991), cremated, and ashes scattered in the Pacific Ocean off Malibu, California
- Vincent Price (1911–1993), ashes scattered off Point Dume in Malibu, California
- Gene Kelly (1912–1996), cremated, ashes scattered
- Robert Mitchum (1917–1997), cremated ashes scattered
- Deng Xiaoping (1904-1997), second paramount leader of China, cremated and ashes scattered.
- John F. Kennedy Jr (1960–1999), scattered into the Atlantic Ocean by the U.S. Navy off Martha's Vineyard
- DeForest Kelley (1920–1999), ashes scattered into the Pacific Ocean
- Doug Henning (1947–2000), cremated, and ashes scattered into the Pacific Ocean of Redondo Beach, California
- Werner Klemperer (1920–2000), cremated ashes scattered
- Sir Edmund Hillary (1919–2008), cremated, and ashes scattered in New Zealand's Hauraki Gulf
- Leyla Gencer (1928–2008), ashes scattered into the Bosphorus
- Tan Chor Jin (1966–2009), a convicted murderer who was executed for fatally shooting a nightclub owner.
- Osama bin Laden (1957–2011); one U.S. official stated that "finding a country willing to accept the remains of the world's most wanted terrorist would have been difficult". It was also done to prevent his burial place from becoming a "terrorist shrine".
- Dick Clark (1929–2012), cremated and ashes were scattered into the Pacific Ocean
- Neil Armstrong (1930–2012), cremated, ashes scattered into the Atlantic Ocean from the U.S. Navy cruiser Philippine Sea
- Robin Williams (1951–2014), cremated the day after his death, ashes scattered in San Francisco Bay
- Zhang Huaxiang (1987–2016), a Chinese nurse who was murdered in Singapore. Her body was cremated and her ashes were scattered at sea. Her killer, Boh Soon Ho, was found guilty of murder and sentenced to life imprisonment.
- Liu Xiaobo (1955–2017), 2010 Nobel Peace Prize laureate, ashes scattered into the ocean off north-eastern China.
- Abu Bakr al-Baghdadi (1971–2019), Caliph of the Islamic State of Iraq and the Levant. Remains were buried at sea after Abu Bakr detonated a suicide vest during a raid by US forces; as with bin Laden, the sea burial was carried out according to Islamic rites.
- Jiang Zemin (1926–2022), former President of China and general secretary of the Chinese Communist Party, cremated and ashes were scattered into Yangtze River Estuary.

== See also ==
- Military funeral
- Natural burial
- Viking funeral
- Reef burials
