= Tom Cranston =

Scottish footballer

Personal information
- Full name: Thomas Cranston
- Date of birth: 1891
- Place of birth: Ardrossan, Scotland
- Date of death: 13 January 1916 (aged 24–25)
- Place of death: Iraq
- Position: Outside right

Senior career*
Years	Team	Apps	(Gls)
–1912	Ardrossan Celtic		
1912–1914	Raith Rovers	56	(8)
1914	→ Third Lanark (loan)	7	(0)
1914–1915	Clyde	22	(5)
- * Club domestic league appearances and goals

Thomas Cranston (1891 – 13 January 1916) was a Scottish professional footballer who played in the Scottish League for Raith Rovers, Third Lanark and Clyde as an outside right.

== Personal life ==
After the outbreak of the First World War in August 1914, Cranston enlisted as a private in The Black Watch (Royal Highlanders). He was killed in action in Iraq on 13 January 1916, during the Mesopotamian campaign. He was buried in Amara War Cemetery.

== Honours ==
Clyde

- Glasgow Cup: 1914–15
