= Neptune Memorial Reef =

Man-made reef off the coast of Florida

Coordinates: 25°41.412′N 80°5.445′W

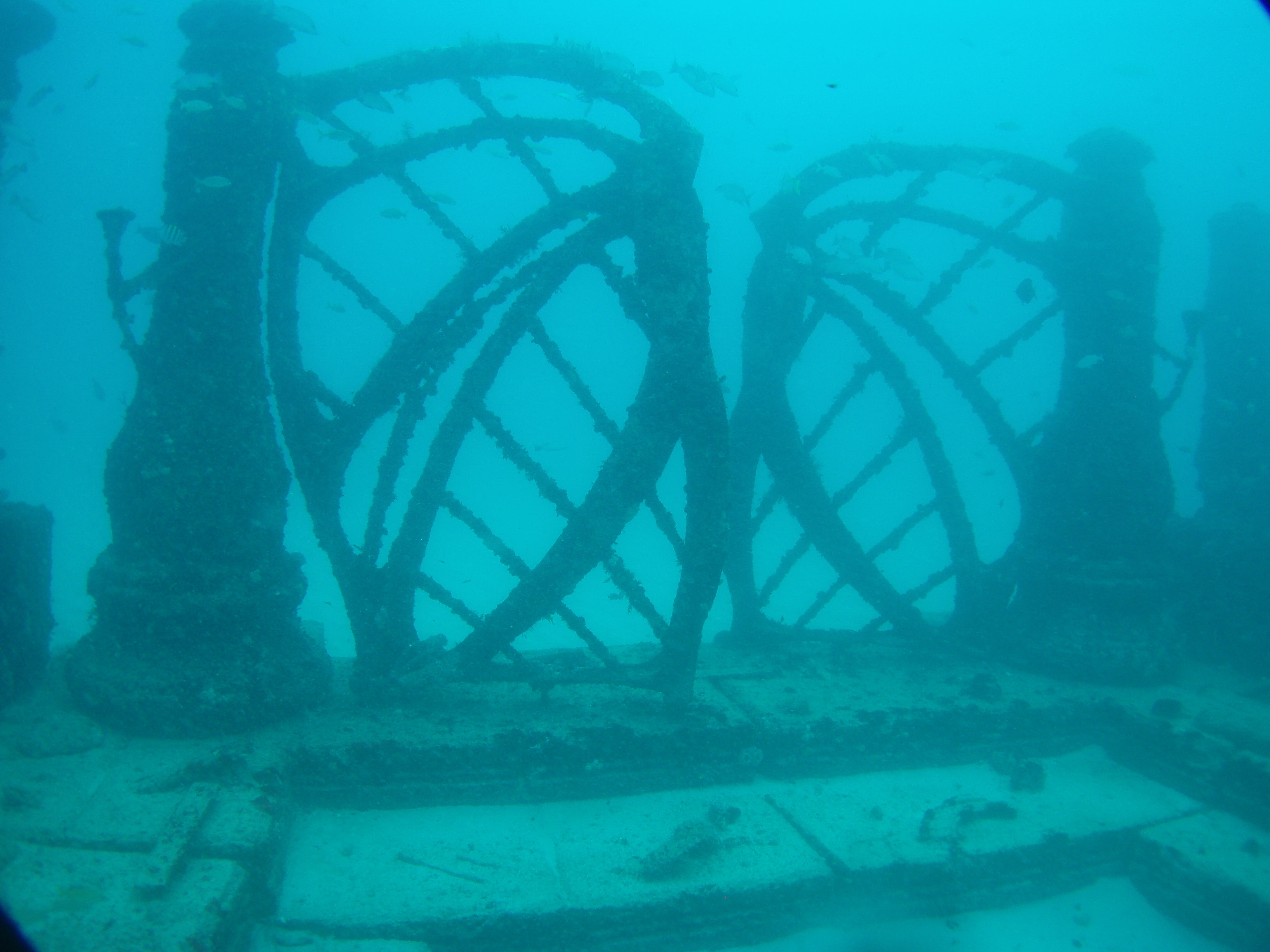
- The Neptune Memorial Reef's underwater gates.
- Interactive map of Neptune Memorial Reef

Details
- Location: 3.25 miles (5.23 km) off the coast of Key Biscayne, Florida
- Type: Burial-at-sea underwater columbarium
- Size: 16 acres (6.5 ha)

The Neptune Memorial Reef is an underwater columbarium in what was conceived by the creator as the world's largest artificial reef, covering over 600,000 square feet (56,000 m^{2}) of ocean floor at a depth of 40 feet (12 m). It was originally conceived by Gary Levine and designed by artist Kim Brandell and known as the Atlantis Reef Project or the Atlantis Reef. As of 2012, the Reef occupies a one-half-acre (0.20 ha) space, but a planned expansion 16 acres (6.5 ha) is underway. The city design involves underwater roads leading to a central feature with benches and statuary.

The place was chosen at 3.25 miles (5.2 km) off the coast of Key Biscayne, Florida. It is a type of burial at sea—Reef burials, and the first phase is estimated to be able to accommodate 850 remains, with an eventual goal of more than 125,000 remains. Though often referred to in news articles as an underwater mausoleum or underwater cemetery, the Neptune Society Memorial Reef meets the criteria for neither. Cremated remains are mixed with cement to form features of the Reef, and memorial plaques are added. The Reef is more correctly identified as a cremation memorial site or aquatic columbarium.

The man-made reef, located three miles (5 km) off the coast of Florida's Key Biscayne, opened in 2007 after a number of difficulties, including permits. After an extensive evaluation and permitting process, the Atlantis Reef Project has been permitted by the EPA, DERM, NOAA, Florida Fish and Wildlife, and the Army Corps of Engineers. One of the construction requirements was that the Memorial Reef be built to withstand the strongest storm in the last 100 years. During the permitting process, Hurricane Andrew, a category 5 hurricane, swept through, requiring a re-engineering of the Reef.

The reef stretches across 16 acres (65,000 m^{2}) of ocean floor designed as both a home for sea life and "a destination for divers". The Neptune Memorial Reef lies in a special management zone. Boaters and divers are welcome, but no fishing or lobster-taking is allowed. Now that reef-building coral have developed at the site, the Reef can be properly identified as a coral reef.

The Neptune Memorial Reef is actively working the site and expanded from less than an acre to its original permitted 16 acres.
