= Murdoch McKenzie (footballer) =

Scottish footballer

Personal information
- Full name: Murdoch McKenzie
- Date of birth: 29 November 1899 (Note: No birth date is listed in Joyce's Football League Players' Records or Tweddle's Definitive Darlington. In contemporary sources, the Derby Daily Telegraph of December 1925 describes him as "not so young as some of the Scots that have crossed the border this past six or seven months, for he is now almost 27 years of age", implying a birth year of 1899, whereas the Portsmouth Evening News of July 1926 has him "barely 24 years of age", implying 1902.)
- Place of birth: Ayr, Scotland
- Date of death: 26 March 1941 (aged 41)
- Place of death: Ayr, Scotland
- Height: 5 ft 10 1/2 in (1.79 m)
- Position: Inside left

Senior career*
Years	Team	Apps	(Gls)
1917–1925	Ayr United	132	(56)
1925–1926	Darlington	37	(17)
1926–1927	Portsmouth	4	(1)
1927–1928	Hamilton Academical	10	(1)
- * Club domestic league appearances and goals

Murdoch McKenzie (29 November 1899 – 26 March 1941) was a Scottish association footballer who scored 18 goals from 41 appearances in the Football League playing as an inside left or centre forward for Darlington and Portsmouth in the 1920s. He also played in the Scottish League for Ayr United and Hamilton Academical.

== Football career ==
McKenzie was born in Ayr. (Note: Birthplace stated as Benhar (West Lothian) in some sources.) He joined local Scottish League Division One club Ayr United from 1917 but only played once in his first three seasons before becoming a regular in the side from 1920, with his absence likely related to the First World War, in which he served in Constantinople. When Ayr were relegated in 1924–25, he chose to move to England; he had scored 17 of Ayr's 43 goals that season, and was described by the Derby Daily Telegraph as "quite the best player that club have sent to England since they allowed Johnny Crosbie to go to Birmingham".

He signed for Darlington in 1925 ahead of their first season in the Football League Second Division. He went straight into the starting eleven for the opening match, at home to Nottingham Forest, and played regularly throughout the season, appearing in 37 league matches out of a possible 42. He also scored regularly, contributing two goals to Darlington's 7–1 defeat of Portsmouth in October and another two in a 3–3 draw with Swansea Town in December. In mid-January, he was switched to centre forward ahead of Darlington's first ever league meeting with Derby County in an attempt to remedy the team's goal drought. He produced two goals in a 3–1 win, went on to lead the line brilliantly when scoring four in a 6–0 defeat of Clapton Orient in February, and attracted attention from First Division clubs. According to the Derby Daily Telegraph, he "has the build and weight for the position, and he adds to a nice turn of speed and dash a cleverness in ball distribution which enables him to keep both his wings going." He finished the season with 17 goals from his 39 appearances in all competitions.

His performances earned him a transfer to the ambitious Portsmouth club, where the local newspaper, the Evening News, suggested he was chosen because he played in "what is now known to be 'the Pompey style': constructive, unselfish, thoughtful, determined, and – when necessary – forceful", and "should do well in the more congenial surroundings at Fratton Park with real football, rather than the tearaway and haphazard conditions in vogue at Darlington". On the opening day of the season, "the best goal of the match came when McKenzie, obtaining twenty-five yards out, side-stepped an opponent, and shot, at a tremendous pace, into the corner of the net" to complete a 3–1 win against local rivals Southampton. He kept his place for the next three matches, defeats at Manchester City and Oldham Athletic and a home win against Fulham, but the previous season's incumbent, David Watson, returned to the inside-left position for the next match. McKenzie continued to play for Portsmouth's reserve team in the Southern League and London Combination, but those four matches were his last for the first team.

McKenzie returned to Scotland and joined Hamilton Academical; he played ten Division One matches in the first half of the 1927–28 season and scored once, a penalty in a 6–3 defeat of Dunfermline Athletic. Although still in his 20s, it appears he made no further appearances in senior football after this.

At the start of the Second World War he served with the Pioneer Corps and was promoted to corporal, but returned to his hometown suffering from tuberculosis and died there aged 41.
