= John Browning (footballer, born 1888) =

Scottish footballer

Personal information
- Full name: John Browning
- Date of birth: 29 November 1888
- Place of birth: Dumbarton, Scotland
- Date of death: 14 November 1964 (aged 75)
- Place of death: Alexandria, Scotland
- Position: Outside left

Senior career*
Years	Team	Apps	(Gls)
- Glasgow Perthshire
1908–1909	Dumbarton Harp		
1909–1911	Vale of Leven	30	(8)
1911–1919	Celtic	209	(64)
1911	→ Dumbarton Harp (loan)		
1912	→ Vale of Leven	8	(3)
1919–1920	Chelsea	5	(1)
1920	Vale of Leven		
1920–1922	Dumbarton	71	(5)
1922–1924	Vale of Leven	61	(13)
Total		384	(94)

International career
1914	Scotland	1	(0)
1914	Scottish League XI	2	(0)
- * Club domestic league appearances and goals

John Browning (29 November 1888 – 14 November 1964) was a Scottish footballer who played for Celtic, winning four league titles with the club. He is also remembered for his bribery charges in the early part of the 20th century.

== Career ==
=== Club ===
Browning played for local clubs Glasgow Perthshire, Bonhill Hibs, Vale of Leven, and Dumbarton Harp before arriving at Parkhead in 1911. He was loaned back to his two previous teams during his first year at the club.

He made his league debut for Celtic in a 1–0 victory over Third Lanark at Cathkin Park on 2 November 1912 and soon displaced John Brown as the regular starter on the wing. He played with a straightforward, forceful attacking flair which led to plenty of goals. In seven years with Celtic he managed to score a goal every three games, including 15 from 38 league matches during the 1914–15 season. He won four Scottish League titles in consecutive years, from 1914 to 1917 (the league continued during World War I).

He moved to Chelsea in June 1919 where he made just five league appearances, before signing for Vale of Leven in June 1920, and then Dumbarton in September 1920; in 1922 he went back to Vale of Leven again (the club now having re-joined the SFL) for two more years.

=== International ===
On 28 February 1914, Browning made his first and only appearance for Scotland, in a goalless draw against Wales at Celtic Park. He represented the Scottish League XI twice, again in 1914 and was also selected to play for the Glasgow FA against Sheffield in the same year.

== Personal life ==
In 1924, he and Archie Kyle, a former Rangers player, were found guilty of attempting to bribe Bo'ness player Peter Brown in a public house in Glasgow's Dundas Street: both men were sentenced to 60 days' hard labour.

Browning's son of the same name was also a footballer; in addition to playing for Liverpool he also appeared for Dumbarton.
