= Harry Scott (footballer, born 1897) =

Association football player

Personal information
- Full name: John Henry Scott
- Date of birth: 4 February 1897
- Place of birth: Langley Park, County Durham, England
- Date of death: 1970 (aged 72–73)
- Height: 6 ft 0 in (1.83 m)
- Position: Inside forward

Senior career*
Years	Team	Apps	(Gls)
1919–1920	Bank Head Albion		
1920–1921	Newburn Grange		
1921–1922	Bank Head Albion		
1922–1925	Sunderland	2	(0)
1925–1926	Wolverhampton Wanderers	35	(6)
1926–1928	Hull City	29	(8)
1928–1932	Bradford Park Avenue	69	(20)
1932–1933	Swansea Town	40	(7)
1933–1934	Watford	1	(0)
1934–1935	Nuneaton Town		
1935–193?	Vauxhall Motors (Luton)		
- * Club domestic league appearances and goals

John Henry Scott (4 February 1897 – 1970) was an English professional footballer who played as an inside forward for Sunderland.
