= Fred Barrett (footballer) =

English footballer (1893–1968)

Personal information
- Full name: Frederick Arthur Barrett
- Date of birth: 12 April 1893
- Place of birth: Woodford, London, England
- Date of death: 1968 (aged 74–75)
- Position: Full-back

Senior career*
Years	Team	Apps	(Gls)
1914–1915	Belfast Celtic		
1920–1927	Chelsea	64	(6)
1927–1928	Dundalk		
1928	Ards		
Total		64	(6)
- * Club domestic league appearances and goals

Frederick Arthur Barrett (12 April 1893 – 1968) was an English footballer who played in the Football League for Chelsea.
