= Jack Harrow =

English footballer

Personal information
- Full name: Jack Harry Harrow
- Date of birth: 18 October 1888
- Place of birth: Mitcham, England
- Date of death: 19 July 1958 (aged 69)
- Place of death: Croydon, England
- Height: 5 ft 8 in (1.73 m)
- Positions: Full back; right half

Youth career
- Mill Green Rovers

Senior career*
Years	Team	Apps	(Gls)
1908–1911	Croydon Common	32	(4)
1911–1926	Chelsea	305	(5)

International career
1914	Football League XI	1	(0)
1922–1923	England	2	(0)
- * Club domestic league appearances and goals

Jack Harry Harrow (8 October 1888 – 19 July 1958) was an English footballer who spent his entire professional career at Chelsea. He played mainly as a left-back. He was good at tackling and he also had an accurate shot.

Harrow signed for Chelsea for a fee of £50 from Croydon Common in 1911 and remained until 1926. He was club captain for much of that period, and led Chelsea to their first appearance in an FA Cup final in 1915, although they lost 3–0 on the day to Sheffield United in a match overshadowed by World War I. He was the first Chelsea player to make over 300 appearances, and ended his career with 333 in all competitions.

He played twice for the England national team, winning caps against Northern Ireland and Sweden in 1922 and 1923 respectively.

He died in 1958.

== Personal life ==
Harrow served as an Air Mechanic 2nd Class in the Royal Air Force during the First World War.

== Honours ==
Chelsea

- FA Cup runner-up: 1914–15
