= Jimmy Croal =

Scottish footballer (1885–1939)

Personal information
- Full name: James Anderson Croal
- Date of birth: 27 July 1885
- Place of birth: Hutchesontown, Scotland
- Date of death: 16 September 1939 (aged 54)
- Place of death: Yeovil, England
- Height: 1.75 m (5 ft 9 in)
- Position: Inside left

Youth career
- Falkirk Juniors

Senior career*
Years	Team	Apps	(Gls)
1905–1910	Rangers	3	(0)
1906–1907	→ Ayr Parkhouse (loan)	11	(0)
- → Alloa Athletic (loan)
- → Dunfermline Athletic (loan)
1910–1914	Falkirk	97	(31)
1914–1922	Chelsea	113	(22)
1919	→ Falkirk (guest)	10	(0)
- → Dunfermline Athletic (guest)
1921–1923	Fulham	36	(6)

International career
1913–1914	Scotland	3	(0)
1913–1914	Scottish League XI	3	(3)
- * Club domestic league appearances and goals

James Anderson Croal (27 July 1885 – 16 September 1939) was a Scottish footballer, who played for Falkirk, Rangers, Chelsea and Scotland. He was judged to be a clever inside left who when paired with Bob McNeil was very effective.

== Career ==
Croal was a lively inside left, who joined Rangers in 1905 from junior football. However, he failed to make the breakthrough to the first team and went out on loan to Ayr Parkhouse, Alloa Athletic and Dunfermline Athletic, before finally leaving Ibrox to sign for Falkirk for a £10 fee in November 1910. At Brockville, his career blossomed, and he won the Scottish Cup in 1913, as well as three international caps for Scotland and five appearances for the Scottish League XI. Croal transferred to Chelsea from Falkirk in April 1914. Chelsea paid £2,000 for him and he remained at Stamford Bridge until 1922. He was a member of the Chelsea side that reached the 1915 FA Cup Final. He made a total of 130 appearances for Chelsea, scoring a total of 26 goals. Croal then spent two-and-a-half seasons with Fulham before retiring.

== Personal life ==
Croal was a schoolmaster by profession. In the summer of 1916, two years since the outbreak of the First World War, he enlisted as a private in the King's Royal Rifle Corps. By March 1918 he had risen to the rank of corporal and finished the war as an acting sergeant.

== Honours ==
Falkirk

- Scottish Cup: 1912–13

Chelsea

- FA Cup runner-up: 1914–15
