= Bob McNeil (footballer) =

Scottish footballer

Personal information
- Full name: Robert McNeil
- Date of birth: 24 November 1890
- Place of birth: Springburn, Scotland
- Date of death: 21 February 1948 (aged 57)
- Place of death: Hamilton, Scotland
- Height: 5 ft 7 in (1.70 m)
- Position: Outside left

Senior career*
Years	Team	Apps	(Gls)
- Wishaw Palace Rangers
- Shettleston
1910–1914	Hamilton Academical	100	(14)
1914–1927	Chelsea	279	(27)
1915–1916	→ Motherwell (loan)	10	(3)
1916–1919	→ Hamilton Academical (loan)	87	(16)
1919	→ Motherwell (loan)	1	(1)
Total		477	(61)

International career
1912–1913	Scottish League XI	3	(0)
- * Club domestic league appearances and goals

Robert McNeil (24 November 1890 – 21 February 1948) was a Scottish footballer who played for Hamilton Academical and Chelsea. He was a neat outside left who dribbled well and had an accurate shot.

== Career ==
=== Club ===
Born in Springburn, Glasgow, McNeil spent part of his childhood in Wishaw, Lanarkshire. After spells in the Junior grade where his clubs included Shettleston, he joined Hamilton Academical in December 1910 and quickly established himself, playing in the 1911 Scottish Cup Final which Accies lost to Celtic after a replay.

McNeil transferred to Chelsea from Hamilton Academical in April 1914. He scored on his competitive debut, and was a member of the Blues side that reached the 1915 FA Cup Final. He made a total of 306 appearances for Chelsea and scored a total of 32 goals.

During World War I when the English Football League was suspended but the Scottish Football League continued, McNeil returned north for several guest spells, including nearly three full seasons with Hamilton, shorter spells with Motherwell and a single match for Celtic (in the 1918 Glasgow Cup final) before returning to Chelsea. He later worked as a trainer at Hamilton. Following his death from stomach cancer, he was buried at Cambusnethan Cemetery.

=== International ===
McNeil represented the Scottish Football League XI three times in his initial spell at Hamilton, and played for both sides in the Home Scots v Anglo-Scots trial matches, but never appeared for Scotland at full international level.

== Personal life ==
His son Willie McNeil also appeared for Hamilton Academical in the late 1930s, playing in the same position.

== Honours ==
Hamilton Academical

- Scottish Cup runner-up: 1910–11

Chelsea

- FA Cup runner-up: 1914–15
