= List of Chelsea F.C. players (1–24 appearances) =

Chelsea Football Club are an association football club based in Fulham, West London. Founded in 1905, they play in the Premier League. Below is a list of all the players who made fewer than 25 appearances for the club.

== Key ==
- Appearances as a substitute are included. This feature of the game was introduced in the Football League at the start of the 1965–66 season.

Positions key
Pre-1960s		1960s–	
GK	Goalkeeper		
FB	Full back	DF	Defender
HB	Half back	MF	Midfielder
FW	Forward		

Nationality
The nationality of a player is determined by the country which he has played for during their Chelsea career, or if said person has not played international football, their country of birth.
Position
Playing positions are listed according to the tactical formations that were employed at the time. Thus the change in the names of defensive and midfield positions reflects the tactical evolution that occurred from the 1960s onwards.
Club career
Club career is defined as the first and last calendar years in which the player signed for and left Chelsea.
Total appearances and Total goals
Total appearances and goals comprise those in the Football League, Premier League, FA Cup, Football League Cup, FA Charity / Community Shield, European Cup / UEFA Champions League, UEFA Cup / UEFA Europa League, UEFA Conference League, Inter-Cities Fairs Cup, European Cup Winners' Cup / UEFA Cup Winners' Cup, Full Members' Cup, UEFA Super Cup and FIFA Club World Cup. Matches in friendlies and wartime competitions are excluded.

== Players ==
- **Bold** indicates players currently playing for the club.
- † indicates players who are currently out on loan.
- Italic indicates players who are academy graduates.

As of 21 November 2026

List of Chelsea F.C. players with between 1 and 24 appearances
Player	Nationality	Pos	Club career	Starts	Subs	Total	Goals
Player	Nationality	Pos	Club career	Appearances			Goals
Joe Goodwin	England	FW	1905–1906	2	0	2	0
Charles Harris	England	FB	1905–1906	1	0	1	0
H Harris	England		1905–1906	1	0	1	0
Bob McEwan	Scotland	FB	1905–1906	20	0	20	0
Jimmy Miller	England		1905–1906	1	0	1	0
Francis O'Hara	Scotland	FW	1905–1906	3	0	3	3
Walter Toomer	England	HB	1905–1906	1	0	1	0
Frank Wolff	England	DF	1905–1906	1	0	1	0
Michael Byrne	England	GK	1905–1907	5	0	5	0
James Craigie	Scotland	HB	1905–1907	2	0	2	0
Charles Donaghy	Scotland	FW	1905–1907	3	0	3	1
Willie Porter	England	FW	1905–1907	3	0	3	0
James Watson	Scotland	FW	1906	14	0	14	0
Robert Bush	England	FW	1906–1907	4	0	4	0
James Frost	England	FW	1906–1907	23	0	23	4
Dave McCartney	Scotland	DF	1906–1907	3	0	3	0
Peter Proudfoot	Scotland	HB	1906–1907	12	0	12	0
Ben Whitehouse	England	FW	1906–1908	13	0	13	2
Ronald Brebner	England	GK	1906–19011; 1912–1913	19	0	19	0
Augustus Harding	England	FB	1906–1913	5	0	5	0
Frank Lyon	England	FB	1907–1908	6	0	6	0
George Kennedy	Scotland	HB	1908–1909	12	0	12	0
Edward Reilly	England	FW	1908–1909	1	0	1	0
Thomas Mair	England	FW	1908–1910	9	0	9	1
Nat Robinson	England	GK	1908–1910	3	0	3	0
Joe Bradshaw	England	FW	1909–1910	6	0	6	3
Arthur Holden	England	HB	1909–1910	20	0	20	1
Evan Jones	Wales	FW	1909–1910	21	0	21	4
James Saunders	England	GK	1909–1910	2	0	2	0
Ernest Williams	England	HB	1909–1910	8	0	8	1
Arthur Wileman	England	FW	1909–1911	14	0	14	5
Hugh Dolby	England	FW	1909–1912	2	0	2	0
George Horn	England	HB	1909–1913	2	0	2	0
Philip Smith	England	FW	1910	1	0	1	0
English McConnell	Ireland	MF	1910–1911	21	0	21	0
Kenneth Mackenzie	England		1910–1913	1	0	1	0
William Young Brown	Scotland	FW	1911–1913	10	0	10	2
Robert Buchanan	Scotland	FB	1911–1913	3	0	3	0
Tom Hewitt	Wales	FB	1911–1913	8	0	8	0
William Read	England	FW	1911–1913	4	0	4	0
Jack Harwood	England	FW	1912–1913	4	0	4	0
George Johnson	England	FB	1912–1913	6	0	6	0
Jimmy Turnbull	Scotland	FW	1912–1913	22	0	22	8
John Brown	Scotland	FW	1912–1915	16	0	16	4
William Steer	England	FW	1912–1918	4	0	4	1
Sandy MacFarlane	Scotland	FW	1913–1914	4	0	4	0
George Lake	England	HB	1913–1915	1	0	1	0
Edward Tye	England	FB	1913–1914	1	0	1	0
Andy Walker	England	DF	1913–1920	24	0	24	2
Harold Brittan	England	FW	1913–1920	24	0	24	7
Max Woosnam	England	FW	1914	3	0	3	0
John Browning	Scotland	HB	1919–1920	6	0	6	2
Joe Spottiswood	England	HB	1919–1920	1	0	1	0
James Gallon	England	FW	1919–1921	2	0	2	0
Joseph Langton	England	MF	1919–1922	3	0	3	0
Thomas Baxter	England	HB	1920	1	0	1	0
Joe Ward	Ireland	HB	1920–1922	16	0	16	0
Kenneth McKenzie	Scotland	DF	1920–1923	22	0	22	0
Ted Ferguson	England	FB	1920–1924	2	0	2	0
Bill Finlayson	Scotland	FW	1920–1924	5	0	5	1
John Lee	England	FW	1920–1924	7	0	7	1
James Ashford	England	HB	1920–1925	8	0	8	0
Wilson Marsh	England	GK	1921–1922	12	0	12	0
Stephen Smith	England	HB	1921–1923	23	0	23	1
Walter Bennett	England	FB	1922–1924	5	0	5	0
Billy Haywood	England	FW	1922–1924	22	0	22	2
Alfred Bower	England	FB	1923–1926	9	0	9	0
Bernard Duffy	Scotland	HB	1923–1927	3	0	3	0
Richard Jenkins	England	FW	1924–1925	4	0	4	0
William Morrison	Scotland	FW	1924–1926	1	0	1	0
Arthur Sales	England	HB	1924–1928	7	0	7	0
Billy Williams	England	FW	1927–1928	2	0	2	0
George Anderson	England	FW	1927–1929	9	0	9	0
Christopher Ferguson	Scotland	FW	1927–1930	1	0	1	0
Jack Meredith	England	MF	1928–1929	23	0	23	6
Frank Higgs	England	GK	1928–1930	2	0	2	0
John Carr	England	FB	1928–1931	1	0	1	0
Reg Weaver	England	HB	1929–1932	20	0	20	8
Robert Carter	England	HB	1929–1933	18	0	18	1
Alec Donald	England	FB	1930–1932	24	0	24	0
James Hope	Scotland	FW	1930–1932	1	0	1	0
Stan Macintosh	England	GK	1930–1936	1	0	1	0
Samuel Dudley	England	FW	1932–1934	1	0	1	0
Stan Prout	England	FW	1932–1934	17	0	17	3
James Copeland	England	FW	1932–1937	2	0	2	1
John Hutcheson	Scotland	HB	1934–1937	22	0	22	1
Ernest Reid	Wales	DF	1934–1939	1	0	1	0
Albert Tennant	England	DF	1934–1953	8	0	8	0
Jack Mayes	England	MF	1935–1939	13	0	13	0
David Alexander	Scotland	HB	1935–1945	1	0	1	0
Jack Sherborne	England	FW	1936–1945	5	0	5	0
Douglas Smale	England	HB	1936–1946	9	0	9	0
Sid Bidewell	England	FW	1937–1946	4	0	4	2
Alex White	Scotland	FB	1937–1948	18	0	18	0
Bobby Russell	Scotland	HB	1944–1948	4	0	4	0
Jimmy Bain	Scotland	HB	1946–1947	14	0	14	1
Murdoch Dickie	Scotland	HB	1946–1947	1	0	1	0
Johnny Paton	Scotland	FW	1946–1947	23	0	23	3
Fred Richardson	England	FW	1946–1947	2	0	2	0
Willi Steffen	Switzerland	FB	1946–1947	20	0	20	0
Alex Davidson	Scotland	FW	1946–1948	2	0	2	0
Ray Goddard	England	FB	1946–1948	15	0	15	1
Johnny Galloway	Scotland	FW	1946–1949	4	0	4	0
Joe Simner	England	FW	1947–1949	1	0	1	0
Bob Warren	England	DF	1948–1951	1	0	1	0
Thomas Jenkins	England	FW	1949–1951	5	0	5	0
Jimmy Leadbetter	Scotland	FW	1949–1952	3	0	3	0
Ernie Randall	England	FW	1950–1953	3	0	3	1
Wally Hinshelwood	England	FW	1951	14	0	14	1
Jack Allister	Scotland	FW	1951–1952	4	0	4	1
Harry Hughes	England	FW	1951–1952	1	0	1	0
Ralph Oelofse	South Africa	DF	1951–1953	8	0	8	0
Peter Tuck	England	FW	1951–1954	3	0	3	1
Andy Bowman	Scotland	FW	1951–1955	1	0	1	0
Bob Edwards	England	FW	1951–1955	13	0	13	2
Jimmy Smith	England	FW	1951–1955	23	0	23	3
Mike Collins	England	GK	1951–1957	1	0	1	0
Len Kell	England	FW	1952–1954	3	0	3	0
Miles Spector	England	FW	1952–1954	6	0	6	0
Paul Berry	England	FB	1953–1960	3	0	3	0
Ray Kitchener	England	FW	1954–1956	1	0	1	0
Seamus O'Connell	England	FW	1954–1956	17	0	17	12
Colin Court	Wales	HB	1954–1959	1	0	1	0
Cliff Huxford	England	HB	1955–1959	7	0	7	0
Bill Livingstone	Scotland	DF	1955–1959	22	0	22	0
John Compton	England	FB	1955–1960	12	0	12	0
Bobby Laverick	England	FW	1956–1958	7	0	7	0
Peter Corthine	England	FW	1957–1960	2	0	2	0
David Cliss	England	FW	1957–1962	24	0	24	1
Eric McMillan	England	MF	1958–1960	5	0	5	0
Pat Holton	England	DF	1959–1960	1	0	1	0
Gordon Bolland	England	FW	1960–1962	2	0	2	0
Tommy Docherty	Scotland	MF	1961–1962	4	0	4	0
Mike Pinner	England	GK	1961–1962	1	0	1	0
Dennis Butler	England	MF	1961–1963	18	0	18	0
Errol McNally	Northern Ireland	GK	1961–1963	9	0	9	0
Colin Shaw	England	FW	1961–1963	1	0	1	0
Tommy Harmer	England	FW	1962–1963	9	0	9	1
John O'Rourke	England	FW	1962–1963	1	0	1	0
Jimmy Mulholland	Scotland	FW	1962–1964	12	0	12	3
Dennis Sorrell	England	MF	1962–1964	4	0	4	1
Thomas Knox	Scotland	FW	1962–1965	21	0	21	0
Ian Watson	England	FB	1962–1965	9	0	9	1
John Dunn	England	GK	1962–1966	16	0	16	0
Derek Kevan	England	FW	1963	7	0	7	2
Dennis Brown	England	FW	1963–1964	13	0	13	2
Jim McCalliog	Scotland	MF	1963–1965	12	0	12	3
Billy Sinclair	Scotland	MF	1964–1966	1	0	1	0
Jim Barron	England	GK	1965–1966	1	0	1	0
Jimmy Smart	Scotland	FW	1965–1966	1	0	1	0
Tommy Robson	England	FW	1966	6	1	7	0
Alex Stepney	England	GK	1966	1	0	1	0
Kingsley Whiffen	Wales	GK	1966–1967	1	0	1	0
Roger Wosahlo	England	MF	1966–1967	0	1	1	0
Ian Hamilton	England	FW	1966–1968	3	2	5	2
Barry Lloyd	England	MF	1966–1968	8	2	10	0
Tommy Hughes	Scotland	GK	1966–1971	11	0	11	0
Geoff Butler	England	DF	1967	8	1	9	0
Colin Waldron	England	DF	1967	10	0	10	0
George Luke	England	MF	1967–1968	1	0	1	0
Paul McMillan	Scotland	FW	1967–1968	1	0	1	0
Stewart Houston	Scotland	DF	1967–1972	10	4	14	0
Derek Smethurst	South Africa	FW	1968–1971	18	1	19	5
Peter Feely	England	FW	1970–1973	4	1	5	2
Mike Brolly	England	FW	1971–1974	8	1	9	1
Steve Sherwood	England	GK	1971–1976	17	0	17	0
Tommy Ord	England	FW	1972–1973	3	0	3	1
Tony Potrac	England	FW	1972–1973	1	0	1	0
Brian Bason	England	FW	1972–1977	20	2	22	1
John Sissons	England	FW	1974–1975	12	1	13	0
Gary Johnson	England	FW	1977–1980	18	4	22	9
John Sitton	England	DF	1977–1980	12	2	14	0
Duncan McKenzie	England	FW	1978–1979	16	0	16	4
Lee Frost	England	FW	1978–1980	12	3	15	5
Bob Iles	England	GK	1978–1983	14	0	14	0
Jim Docherty	Scotland	FW	1979	2	1	3	0
Jimmy Clare	England	FW	1980–1981	0	1	1	0
Tim Elmes	England	FW	1980–1982	2	2	4	0
Colin Viljoen	England	MF	1980–1982	22	1	23	0
Mark Falco	England	FW	1982	3	0	3	0
Pop Robson	England	FW	1982–1983	12	5	17	5
Paul Williams	England	DF	1982–1983	1	0	1	0
Tony McAndrew	Scotland	DF	1982–1984	23	0	23	4
Dale Jasper	England	MF	1982–1985	13	2	15	0
Derek Johnstone	Scotland	FW	1983–1985	1	3	4	0
Duncan Shearer	Scotland	FW	1983–1986	2	0	2	1
Gordon Davies	Wales	FW	1984–1985	13	2	15	6
Terry Howard	England	DF	1984–1986	6	0	6	0
Les Fridge	Scotland	GK	1985–1987	1	0	1	0
Robert Isaac	England	FW	1985–1987	13	0	13	0
Mick Bodley	England	FW	1985–1989	8	0	8	1
Colin West	England	FW	1985–1990	8	8	16	4
John McNaught	Scotland	MF	1986–1987	12	1	13	2
John Millar	Scotland	MF	1986–1987	11	0	11	0
John Coady	Republic of Ireland	DF	1986–1988	10	9	19	3
Billy Dodds	Scotland	FW	1986–1989	0	5	5	0
Perry Digweed	England	GK	1987–1988	3	0	3	0
Dave Mitchell	Australia	FW	1989–1991	8	0	8	0
Clive Allen	England	FW	1991–1992	22	2	24	9
Joe Allon	England	FW	1991–1992	4	14	18	3
Ian Pearce	England	DF	1991–1993	0	5	5	0
Michael Gilkes	England	MF	1992	0	2	2	0
Anthony Barness	England	DF	1992–1996	16	3	19	0
Nick Colgan	England	GK	1992–1998	1	0	1	0
Steve Livingstone	England	FW	1993	0	1	1	0
Gerry Peyton	England	GK	1993	0	1	1	0
Andy Dow	Scotland	FW	1993–1996	17	1	18	0
Paul Hughes	England	MF	1994–2000	15	8	23	2
Graham Rix	England	DF	1995	1	3	4	0
Terry Phelan	Republic of Ireland	DF	1995–1997	21	3	24	0
Neil Clement	England	DF	1996–2000	1	3	4	0
Joe Sheerin	England	FW	1996–2000	0	1	1	0
Craig Forrest	Canada	GK	1997	2	1	3	0
Paul Parker	England	DF	1997	1	3	4	0
Nick Crittenden	England	MF	1997–2000	1	2	3	0
Steven Hampshire	Scotland	FW	1997–2000	0	1	1	0
Laurent Charvet	France	DF	1998	7	6	13	2
Brian Laudrup	Denmark	FW	1998	8	3	11	1
Pierluigi Casiraghi	Italy	FW	1998–2000	13	2	15	1
Luca Percassi	Italy	DF	1998–2000	0	2	2	0
Robert Wolleaston	England	MF	1998–2003	0	2	2	0
Emerson Thome	Brazil	DF	1999–2000	20	2	22	0
Rati Aleksidze	Georgia	FW	1999–2001	0	3	3	0
Jes Høgh	Denmark	DF	1999–2001	11	6	17	0
Gabriele Ambrosetti	Italy	FW	1999–2003	11	12	23	1
Leon Knight	England	FW	1999–2003	0	1	1	0
George Weah	Liberia	FW	2000	13	2	15	5
Christian Panucci	Italy	DF	2000–2001	9	1	10	1
Winston Bogarde	Netherlands	DF	2000–2004	4	8	12	0
Mark Bosnich	Australia	GK	2001–2003	7	0	7	0
Joel Kitamirike	England	DF	2001–2004	1	0	1	0
Joe Keenan	England	MF	2002–2006	0	3	3	0
Filipe Oliveira	Portugal	MF	2002–2006	0	8	8	0
Marco Ambrosio	Italy	GK	2003–2004	12	0	12	0
Neil Sullivan	Scotland	GK	2003–2004	7	1	8	0
Lenny Pidgeley	England	GK	2003–2006	1	1	2	0
Juan Sebastian Veron	Argentina	MF	2003–2007	11	3	14	1
Alexis Nicolas	Cyprus	MF	2004	2	1	3	0
Jiří Jarošík	Czech Republic	MF	2004–2006	6	14	20	0
Nuno Morais	Portugal	MF	2004–2007	1	8	9	0
Anthony Grant	England	MF	2004–2008	0	1	1	0
Steven Watt	Scotland	DF	2005–2006	1	1	2	0
Jimmy Smith	England	MF	2005–2009	0	1	1	0
Scott Sinclair	England	FW	2005–2010	6	8	14	1
Maniche	Portugal	MF	2006	5	6	11	0
Khalid Boulahrouz	Netherlands	DF	2006–2008	19	4	23	0
Miroslav Stoch	Slovakia	FW	2006–2010	0	5	5	0
Michael Mancienne	England	DF	2006–2011	3	3	6	0
Tal Ben Haim	Israel	DF	2007–2008	17	6	23	0
Ben Sahar	Israel	FW	2007–2009	0	5	5	0
Sam Hutchinson	England	DF	2007–2010; 2011–2014	2	4	6	0
Michael Woods	England	MF	2007–2011	0	2	2	0
Mineiro	Brazil	DF	2008–2009	1	1	2	0
Franco Di Santo	Argentina	FW	2008–2010	0	16	16	0
Ricardo Quaresma	Portugal	MF	2009	1	4	5	0
Fabio Borini	Italy	FW	2009–2011	1	7	8	0
Jacob Mellis	England	MF	2009–2012	0	1	1	0
Jeffrey Bruma	Netherlands	DF	2009–2013	3	7	10	0
Ross Turnbull	England	GK	2009–2013	16	3	19	0
Patrick van Aanholt	Netherlands	FW	2009–2014	3	5	8	1
Gaël Kakuta	France	FW	2009–2015	5	11	16	0
Yossi Benayoun	Israel	MF	2010–2013	7	17	24	1
Josh McEachran	England	MF	2010–2015	7	15	22	0
Tomáš Kalas	Czech Republic	DF	2010–2019	2	2	4	0
Kevin De Bruyne	Belgium	MF	2012–2014	5	4	9	0
Marko Marin	Germany	MF	2012–2016	5	11	16	1
Nathan Aké	Netherlands	DF	2012–2017	9	8	17	0
Nathaniel Chalobah	England	MF	2012–2017	5	10	15	0
Lucas Piazon	Brazil	FW	2012–2021	2	1	3	0
Mark Schwarzer	Australia	GK	2013–2015	11	1	12	0
Izzy Brown	England	FW	2013–2021	0	1	1	0
Marco van Ginkel	Netherlands	MF	2013–2021	2	2	4	0
Mohamed Salah	Egypt	FW	2014–2016	10	9	19	2
John Swift	England	MF	2014–2016	0	1	1	0
Dominic Solanke	England	FW	2014–2017	0	1	1	0
Bertrand Traoré	Burkina Faso	FW	2014–2017	4	12	16	4
Lewis Baker	England	MF	2014–2022	0	2	2	0
Papy Djilobodji	Senegal	DF	2015–2016	0	1	1	0
Radamel Falcao	Colombia	FW	2015–2016	2	10	12	1
Juan Cuadrado	Colombia	MF	2015–2017	4	11	15	0
Jérémie Boga	Ivory Coast	MF	2015–2018	1	0	1	0
Ola Aina	Nigeria	DF	2015–2019	2	4	6	0
Baba Rahman	Ghana	DF	2015–2023	19	4	23	0
Alexandre Pato	Brazil	FW	2016	1	1	2	1
Jake Clarke-Salter	England	DF	2016–2022	0	2	2	0
Matt Miazga	United States	DF	2016–2022	2	0	2	0
Charly Musonda	Belgium	FW	2016–2022	2	5	7	1
Danny Drinkwater	England	MF	2017–2022	12	11	23	1
Ethan Ampadu	Wales	DF	2017–2023	7	5	12	0
Dujon Sterling	England	DF	2017–2023	0	2	2	0
Kyle Scott	United States	MF	2018–2019	0	1	1	0
Gonzalo Higuaín	Argentina	FW	2019	15	3	18	5
Tariq Lamptey	England	DF	2019–2020	0	3	3	0
Marc Guéhi	England	DF	2019–2021	2	0	2	0
Billy Gilmour	Scotland	MF	2019–2022	14	8	22	0
Tino Anjorin	England	MF	2019–2024	1	4	5	0
Ian Maatsen	Netherlands	DF	2019–2024	3	13	16	0
Malang Sarr	France	DF	2020–2024	16	5	21	0
Saúl Ñíguez	Spain	MF	2021–2022	12	11	23	1
Xavier Simons	England	MF	2021–2023	1	0	1	0
Jude Soonsup-Bell	England	FW	2021–2023	1	0	1	0
Marcus Bettinelli	England	GK	2021–2025	1	0	1	0
Harvey Vale	England	MF	2021–2025	1	6	7	0
Pierre-Emerick Aubameyang	Gabon	FW	2022–2023	11	10	21	3
Denis Zakaria	Switzerland	MF	2022–2023	7	4	11	1
Mason Burstow	England	FW	2022–2024	1	2	3	0
Lewis Hall	England	MF	2022–2024	11	1	12	0
Omari Hutchinson	Jamaica	MF	2023–2024	0	2	2	0
Diego Moreira	Portugal	FW	2023–2024	1	0	1	0
Cesare Casadei	Italy	MF	2023–2025	4	13	17	0
Alfie Gilchrist	England	DF	2023–2025	5	12	17	1
Bashir Humphreys	England	DF	2023–2025	2	0	2	0
Alex Matos	England	FW	2023–2025	0	2	2	0
Lesley Ugochukwu	France	MF	2023–2025	6	9	15	0
David Datro Fofana	Ivory Coast	FW	2023–2026	1	3	4	0
Deivid Washington	Brazil	FW	2023–2026	0	3	3	0
Michael Golding	England	MF	2024	0	1	1	0
Renato Veiga	Portugal	DF	2024–2025	12	6	18	2
Ato Ampah	England	FW	2024–2026	0	1	1	0
Leo Castledine	England	MF	2024–2026	0	1	1	0
Samuel Rak-Sakyi	England	MF	2024–2026	1	3	4	0
Jimi Tauriainen	Finland	MF	2024–2026	0	2	2	0
**Aarón Anselmino**	Argentina	DF	2024–	0	1	1	0
**Kiano Dyer** †	England	MF	2024–	0	1	1	0
**Shim Mheuka** †	England	FW	2024–	1	8	9	0
**Harrison Murray-Campbell** †	England	DF	2024–	0	1	1	0
Mathis Amougou	France	DF	2025	0	2	2	0
Facundo Buonanotte	Argentina	MF	2025–2026	7	1	8	1
**Genesis Antwi** †	Sweden	DF	2025–	0	2	2	0
**Dário Essugo** †	Portugal	MF	2025–	0	8	8	0
**Mike Penders**	Belgium	GK	2026–	6	1	7	0
**Mamadou Sarr** †	Senegal	DF	2025–	4	3	7	0
**Reggie Walsh** †	England	MF	2025–	1	3	4	0
**Valentín Barco**	Argentina	MF	2026–	3	4	7	1
**Jesse Derry** †	England	FW	2026–	1	2	3	0
**Emmanuel Emegha**	Netherlands	FW	2026–	1	2	3	1
**Ryan Kavuma-McQueen** †	England	FW	2026–	0	1	1	0
**Pep Chavarría**	Spain	DF	2026–	6	5	11	0
**Jordan Henderson**	England	MF	2026–	6	1	7	2
**Maxence Lacroix**	France	DF	2026–	10	1	11	0
**Emiliano Martínez**	Argentina	MF	2026–	7	0	7	0
**Mahdi Nicoll-Jazuli**	England	MF	2026–	0	1	1	0
**Marco Palestra**	Italy	DF	2026–	2	4	6	0
**Geovany Quenda**	Portugal	FW	2026–	1	6	7	0
**Morgan Rogers**	England	MF	2026–	13	1	14	6
**Reggie Watson**	England	MF	2026–	1	0	1	0
**Danny Welbeck**	England	FW	2026–	4	8	12	3

== See also ==
- List of Chelsea F.C. players
- List of Chelsea F.C. players (25–99 appearances)
