= 1905–06 Chelsea F.C. season =

English football club season

Chelsea
1905–06 season
- Owner: Gus Mears
- Chairman: Claude Kirby
- Manager: Jacky Robertson
- Stadium: Stamford Bridge
- Second Division: 3rd
- FA Cup: Third Qualifying Round
- Top goalscorer: League: Frank Pearson (18); All: Frank Pearson (18)
- Highest home attendance: 67,000 vs Manchester United (13 April 1906)
- Lowest home attendance: 3,000 vs Lincoln City (17 February 1906)
- Average home league attendance: 13,849
- Biggest win: 7–0 v Burslem Port Vale (3 March 1906)
- Biggest defeat: 1–7 v Crystal Palace (18 November 1905)
Home colours	Away colours

The 1905–06 season was Chelsea Football Club's first competitive season and first year in existence. Newly elected to the Football League, Chelsea competed in the Second Division. Under the guidance of young player-manager Jacky Robertson, Chelsea finished third in the division earning 53 points (under the two points for a win system), missing out on promotion after a late run of bad form. The Pensioners also suffered from bad luck in the FA Cup, a scheduling conflict forcing them to play a mostly amateur reserve side against non-league Crystal Palace, losing 7–1 in the Third Qualifying Round.

== Formation and pre-season buildup ==
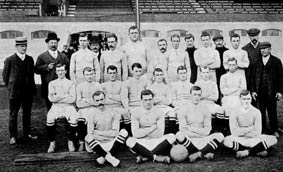
The first Chelsea team in September 1905.

Chelsea Football Club were founded on 10 March 1905 although the club's early existence was hindered with problems. Since there was already a team named Fulham F.C. in the Metropolitan Borough of Fulham, a name for the club had to be decided. After London F.C., Kensington F.C. and Stamford Bridge F.C. were rejected, the name of the adjacent borough, the Metropolitan Borough of Chelsea, was settled on.

Blue shirts were adopted for the team by the club's founder and first chairman, Gus Mears, along with white shorts and dark blue socks. Further problems arose when the team were denied entry to the Southern League following objections from Fulham and Tottenham Hotspur, so admission to the Football League was applied for. Their candidacy was endorsed at the Football League annual general meeting on 29 May 1905. Scottish international John Robertson was hired as the club's first player-manager, a half-back who would go on to score Chelsea's first competitive goal in a 1–0 win against Blackpool. After this, the club recruited many established players from other teams, including 22 stone goalkeeper William "Fatty" Foulke previously of Sheffield United, and forward Jimmy Windridge who came from Small Heath.

Chelsea were one of four new teams to join the Football League, the other three being Hull City, Leeds City and Clapton Orient.

== Month by month review ==
=== September ===
Chelsea's first ever league campaign began on 2 September with a trip to Cheshire to face Lancashire Combination champions Stockport County at Edgeley Park. The match was a tight affair against a side with previous experience in the second tier, with County having an Ashton Schofield penalty saved by Chelsea goalkeeper Bill Foulke only for George Dodd to put the ball in from the rebound with half an hour to play to give the hosts two points. For their following match on 9 September, The Pensioners once again travelled up north, this time to Lancashire to play Blackpool at Bloomfield Road, gaining their first two points of the season in another close encounter through a late winner from player-manager Jacky Roberston in the 80th minute, who gained the distinction of being Chelsea's first ever league goalscorer. Furthermore, Foulke kept his first clean sheet of the season, registering the club's first ever in the league. Two days later, Chelsea played their first ever home league match against newly elected Hull City, with the Blues romping to a 5–1 win. David Copeland grabbed a first half brace through goals in the 15th and 40th minutes, in the second half, Jimmy Windridge added a quick-fire double in the 55th and 58th minutes to give the Blues four, with the Tigers then gaining a consolation through Peter Howe before Windridge scored his third, registering Chelsea's first ever league hat-trick. Furthermore, Foulke kept up his heroics with a save from Hull's player-manager Ambrose Langley's penalty, his second in three matches.

On 16 September Chelsea made their way to the West Riding of Yorkshire where they drew 1–1 with Bradford City, who had only switched codes from rugby league two years prior. Played at Valley Parade in front of a large crowd of 17,000, the Blues fell behind to a Wally Smith goal after 62 minutes, but saved a point through a late equaliser from Bob McRoberts in the 85th minute. On 23 September, Chelsea earned their third win of the league campaign against 2-time FA Cup winners, recent Second Division champions and former First Division side West Bromwich Albion at Stamford Bridge, the 1–0 victory coming courtesy of another McRoberts goal in the 25th minute. Chelsea ended the month with another victory on 30 September, this time in Leicestershire at Filbert Street against Leicester Fosse. The winner coming via Jimmy Robertson in the 10th minute. Playing 6 games and winning 4 of them, Chelsea ended the month with 9 points and in 3rd place, showing very promising form and exhibiting clear potential to mount a strong promotion push in their début season.

=== October ===
On 7 October Chelsea began their first cup campaign with a 6-1 drubbing of the 1st Grenadier Guards' football team in an FA Cup First Qualifying Round match at Stamford Bridge, Francis O'Hara opened the scoring after 2 minutes, registering the club's first-ever cup goal, with Jimmy Robertson adding a second shortly after. O'Hara promptly got his second, giving the Blues a 3–0 lead after only 15 minutes. Martin Moran made it 4-0 before Pte. Stanley gave the soldiers a consolation in the 50th minute, however Jimmy Windridge later scored a brace give to Chelsea a wider winning margin. Chelsea maintained their strong league form in Northern Lincolnshire with a convincing 4–1 defeat of Lincoln City at Sincil Bank on 14 October, Windridge opened the scoring in the 30th minute, followed by a Frank Pearson goal two minutes later. McRoberts later added a third and Pearson added a fourth to complete a brace, with William Watson managing a consolation goal for the Imps in the 85th minute. However their seven match unbeaten run in all competitions came to an end on 21 October with the visit of Chesterfield Town to Stamford Bridge, the winner coming from Joe Ball in the 55th minute for a 1–0 win over the Blues.

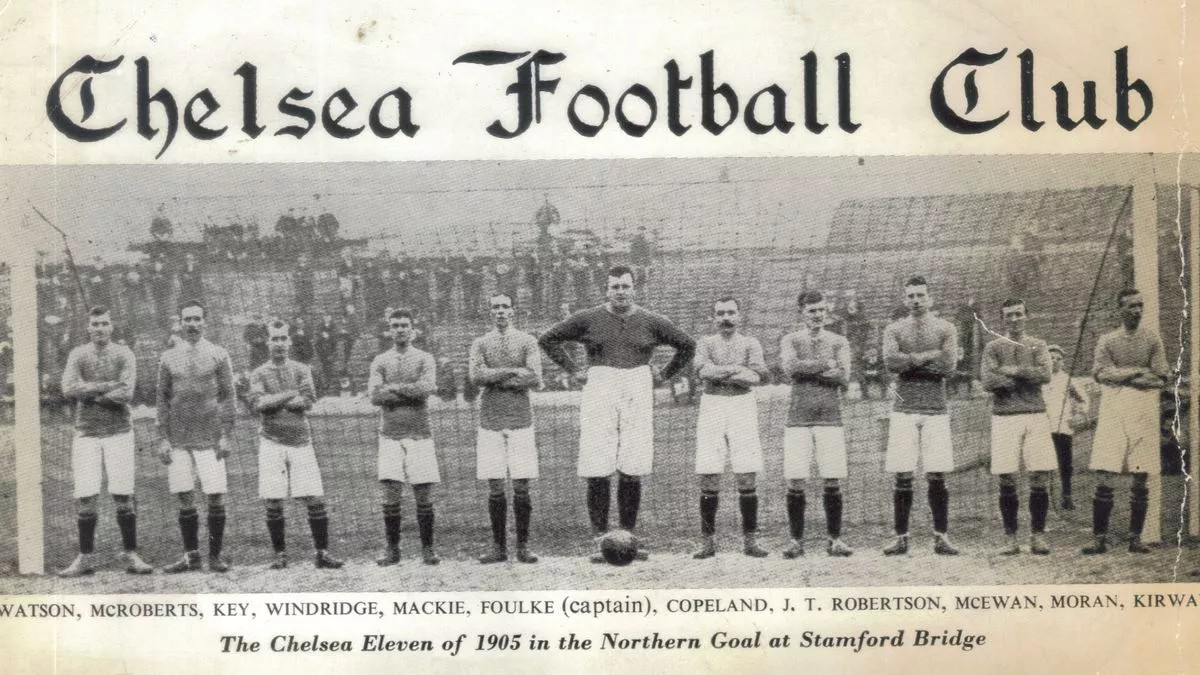

In the Second Qualifying Round of the FA Cup, the Blues travelled to the south of the capital to play fellow Londoners Southern United of the Southern League Division Two at Brown's Ground in Nunhead, Camberwell. The Pensioners won the derby 1-0 courtesy of a Tommy McDermott goal. Furthermore, defender Bob Mackie kept a clean sheet whilst deputising for Foulke, registering the club's first ever in the FA Cup Two days later, Chelsea suffered their second consecutive league defeat at the hands of Burslem Port Vale at the Athletic Ground in Staffordshire, the Valiants went two goals up via George Price and Harry Croxton in the 9th and 51st minutes respectively. The Blues later pulled a goal back through Pearson, however Robert Carter re-established Burslem's two goal advantage before Moran halved their lead once more with five minutes left, however Chelsea could not find an equaliser. Chelsea ended October having won two cup games and progressing to the Third Qualifying Round of the FA Cup, however a dip in league form saw them to drop to 6th place, denting their promotion hopes.

=== November ===
On 4 November Chelsea bounced back from those two league defeats by trouncing Barnsley 6–0 at Stamford Bridge. Pearson opened the scoring in the 25th minute, with Copeland and McDermott adding another two goals in quick succession in the 26th and 32nd minutes respectively, thus giving the Pensioners a 3–0 lead, with all three goals coming within a 7-minute period. Later on McRoberts scored a penalty 5 minutes from half-time to make it 4, Pearson got his second and Chelsea's fifth in the 75th minute, and McDermott also got a brace, adding a 6th in the 90th minute. On 11 November, the Blues travelled to Clapton, Hackney to face newly elected Londoners Clapton Orient at Millfields Road, once again Chelsea registered a comfortable victory, beating Orient 3–0, Pearson opened the scoring in the 43rd minute, with Copeland adding a second in the 60th minute and Pearson completing his brace in the 75th minute to wrap up the scoring, giving the Blues their first derby win in the league. Additionally, Foulke kept his 5th clean sheet of the league campaign, with Chelsea's newly assembled defence finding their feet.

Chelsea registered their third consecutive league win against former First Division side and Second Division champions several years prior, Burnley at Stamford Bridge on 18 November, the narrow 1–0 victory courtesy of a McRoberts goal in the 70th minute. However, due to a scheduling conflict, Chelsea crashed out of the FA Cup in the Third Qualifying Round after they were forced to play Southern League Division Two side Crystal Palace in another cup derby at the FA Cup Final venue, the Crystal Palace Park in Penge, Kent just outside of London on the same day as the league match with Burnley, with Jacky Robertson prioritising the league match, he fielded a mostly amateur reserve side in the cup, losing 7–1. Wilf Innerd opened the scoring for Palace, getting an early brace, followed by two goals from Mart Watkins, whose second was a penalty, to make it 4. Archie Needham and Dick Harker then added a 5th and 6th respectively, with Watkins completing his hat-trick to make it 7. Chelsea did at least manage a late consolation goal through O'Hara. To add to the Pensioners' humiliation, to this day, this defeat is the largest win a non-league side has ever registered against league opposition in the FA Cup. Chelsea wrapped up the month with a 0–0 draw against newly elected Leeds City at Elland Road on 25 November. Despite Chelsea's unfortunate FA Cup exit, the Blues went undefeated in the league in November, winning 3 and drawing 1 without conceding a goal, taking them back up to 3rd place and back into contention for promotion.

=== December ===
Chelsea kept up their good form with a 3–0 defeat of Burton United at Stamford Bridge on 2 December, Jimmy Robertson getting the first goal in the 20th minute with McDermott and Moran adding a second and third respectively. On 9 December, Chelsea narrowly defeated Grimsby Town 2–0 at Stamford Bridge, with two late goals coming from Tom McDermott and Jack Kirwan in the 80th and 85th minutes respectively, with Bob McRoberts also having a penalty saved. On 16 December, Chelsea won once again, this time at The Northolme beating Gainsborough Trinity 2–0, Jimmy Robertson scoring the first goal in the 20th minute with Hall later netting an own goal. Foulke once again kept a clean sheet, his 10th of the season after only 16 league games.

On 23 December, the Pensioners began a hectic festive period with 3 games in 4 days, the first 2 against promotion rivals. They drew 0–0 with Bristol City at Stamford Bridge, and two days later on Christmas Day, drew with Manchester United at Bank Street by the same scoreline. On Boxing Day, Chelsea travelled to North Road to play Glossop, winning 4–2. The scorers that day were McRoberts, who opened the scoring after 15 minutes for the Blues, with Kirwan following up to make it 2–0. However, Cuffe halved Chelsea's lead 5 minutes before half-time. Kirwan scored his second, completing a brace in the 65th minute to make it 3-1 before Cameron reduced their lead to one goal once more. Jacky Robertson finally sealed the win with the match's 6th goal to make it 4–2. Those two goals by Glossop were the first time the Pensioners conceded in 9 matches. Chelsea ended 1905 on a high with a 4–2 win at Stamford Bridge against Stockport County on 30 December, despite falling behind to a Pass goal after a quarter of an hour. Jimmy Robertson scored two goals in succession to give Chelsea the lead before Waters equalised 3 minutes after half-time. Despite this setback Robertson scored once more to complete his hat-trick with Pearson adding a 4th to complete the scoring. Thus Chelsea ended a second successive month undefeated in the league, their run now stretching to 11 matches. With 30 points and in 3rd place, Chelsea maintained a serious promotion push.

=== January ===
The Pensioners began 1906 just as they ended 1905, keeping up their 12-game unbeaten run in the league with a 6-0 hammering of Blackpool on 6 January at Stamford Bridge. Kirwan and Jimmy Robertson made the score 2-0 after goals in the 20th and 30th minutes respectively, Pearson and Moran netted the next 2 goals to give Chelsea 4, Jacky Robertson got the 5th after 55 minutes and Pearson wrapped up the scoring, completing a brace in the 67th minute. On 20 January Chelsea won their 4th consecutive league game, beating Bradford City 4–2. The Blues were 2-0 up at half-time courtesy of goals from Jimmy Robertson and McDermott in the 35th and 40th minutes respectively. In the second half goals from Copeland a minute after the restart and from Kirwan in the 65th minute saw Chelsea go 4-0 up. The Citizens however mounted a late, desperate comeback attempt with McMillan scoring their first and Clarke adding a second 2 minutes from time.

Chelsea played their first away match of the year at The Hawthorns against West Bromwich Albion being held 1-1, ending their 4-game winning streak. Pearson opened the scoring for the Blues and Manners later equalised for Albion. Chelsea ended January undefeated in the league for 3 consecutive months showing exceptional form. However Bristol City and Manchester United also kept up their very solid form, keeping Chelsea outside the automatic promotion places, but with 35 points and in 3rd place, Chelsea were well positioned to take the promotion race down to the wire.

=== February ===
Chelsea began the month with a 3–3 draw with Leicester Fosse at Stamford Bridge on 5 February. The Blues raced to a 2–0 lead within 10 minutes with goals by Windridge and Jimmy Robertson in the 2nd and 10th minutes respectively. Hodgkinson got one back for Leicester in the 25th minute before Pearson gave Chelsea a 3-1 half-time lead with a goal in the 42nd minute. In the second half, goals from Blessington and Hubbard saved a point for Leicester. On 10 February Chelsea's astonishing 15-match unbeaten run in the league was brought to a crashing halt at Anlaby Road as the Blues went 4-0 down to Hull City, all the more surprising as the Tigers were beaten 5-1 by Chelsea in September. The goalscorers for Hull were Rushton, who opened the scoring, followed by a brace from Joe Smith with the 4th scored by Gordon. Chelsea mounted a valiant comeback effort however, but it was to prove in vain as they could only manage three goals from Windridge, Jacky Robertson and Jimmy Robertson.

On 17 February Chelsea were back to winning ways for the visit of Lincoln City to Stamford Bridge, who were beaten 4–2. Pearson's goal in the 1st minute clearly emphasised Chelsea's intent to put the previous week's result behind them, however Martin equalised for Lincoln. Despite this setback, McDermott and George Key gave Chelsea a secure lead before McRoberts tucked away a penalty with 10 minutes to go to make it 4. Machin grabbed a second for the Imps, however it was too late to mount a comeback. On 24 February Chelsea travelled to the Recreation Ground to defeat Chesterfield Town 2–0. Kirwan and Pearson gave the Blues the win with goals in the 4th and 20th minutes respectively. The Blues finished the month still in third place, with their sights still set firmly on the promotion places.

=== March ===
Chelsea won their 3rd match in a row with a 7-0 thrashing of Burslem Port Vale at Stamford Bridge on 3 March. Jimmy Robertson opened the scoring and McRoberts added the second from the penalty spot after half an hour. Pearson and Jacky Robertson added another 2 to give the Pensioners 4 goals. Moran scored the fifth and Kirwan completed the scoring with a brace, his second coming 40 minutes from time. Furthermore, Bill Foulke astonishingly managed to keep a clean sheet despite the Blues conceding 2 penalties, by saving both of them. Chelsea maintained their winning ways with a narrow 2–1 win against Barnsley at Oakwell on 10 March. Pearson opened the scoring for the Blues with a goal in the 22nd minute, however Wall later equalised for the Reds before Windridge scored the winner for Chelsea in the 58th minute. This win allowed the Pensioners to overtake Manchester United into second place, who had 2 matches in hand however, putting Chelsea in the promotion places for the first time in the season. On 17 March Chelsea faced Clapton Orient at Stamford Bridge, getting an impressive 6–1 win despite going behind to a Leigh goal after 10 minutes. Windridge opened the scoring for Chelsea followed by goals from Charles Donaghy, Pearson and John Robertson, who scored from 12 yards to make it 4. James Robertson added a fifth before Windridge scored his second to round off the scoring, to secure the Blues' fifth consecutive victory.

However, Chelsea's purple patch came to an abrupt end with a disappointing 2–0 defeat to Burnley at Turf Moor on 24 March, with the Clarets securing the win through two first-half goals from Bell and R Smith in the 11th and 21st minutes respectively. Chelsea bounced back from that defeat with a 4–0 rout of Leeds City on 31 March at Stamford Bridge, with Pearson getting the opener after half an hour and McRoberts doubling the Blues' led through a penalty in the 40th minute, with McDermott later added a third and Windridge scoring the fourth with a quarter of an hour left to round off the scoring. Chelsea thus ended the month strongly with 4 wins, however their defeat at Burnley cost them dearly and they ended the month once again just outside the promotion places as Manchester United regained 2nd place after playing their outstanding fixtures. Chelsea could ill afford any more slip ups going into the final month of the season as the promotion race between the Blues, Bristol City and Manchester United began to reach its critical stage.

=== April ===
At the start of the month, Bristol City led the league with 55 points in 32 matches played, however Manchester United, who had a game in hand, and Chelsea were 6 and 7 points behind the Robins respectively. In 4th place were West Bromwich Albion on 46 points and 32 matches played, who also still had a very real chance of clinching second place. On 7 April Chelsea faced Burton United at Peel Croft and secured a very important 4–2 win. Windridge opened the scoring after 10 minutes and later added a second before Hunt halved the Pensioners' lead 3 minutes before half-time. James Robertson then added Chelsea's third to restore the two goal cushion before Burton once again halved their lead through a Bradshaw goal, however the victory was confirmed by Windridge's 3rd, completing his second hat-trick of the season. Elsewhere Bristol City drew with Burnley, thus giving Manchester United, who registered a victory over Clapton Orient, and Chelsea's title hopes a shot in the arm, West Bromwich Albion lost heavily to Hull City however, seriously denting their fragile promotion push. On 13 April Chelsea played promotion rivals Manchester United at Stamford Bridge in a make or break match for both sides. The contest finished in a hard-fought 1–1 draw attended by 67 000 spectators, with Peddie opening the scoring for United in the 67th minutes. McDermott equalised for Chelsea with 10 minutes to play, keeping the Pensioners' promotion hopes alive. However, Bristol City won their match against Gainsborough Trinity, taking advantage of the draw between their closest rivals to increase their lead at the top, whereas West Bromwich Albion suffered another heavy defeat, this time to Barnsley, all but ending their promotion hopes. The following day Chelsea travelled to Blundell Park to face Grimsby Town where they could only muster a disappointing 1–1 draw. The Mariners took the lead through Robinson 5 minutes before half-time, and Jacky Robertson rescued a point for Chelsea with a last-minute equaliser. Bristol City and Manchester United both won against Leeds City and Burnley respectively, with both sides edging away from Chelsea, who desperately needed to win their next match two days later. Furthermore, Bristol City's victory meant that Chelsea could mathematically no longer win the league.

For a third match in a row Chelsea failed to win, drawing 0–0 at home with Glossop, whereas Manchester United defeated Gainsborough Trinity to establish a 3-point lead over the Blues, putting their promotion hopes in serious jeopardy as they still had a game in hand over them. In the meantime, Bristol City recorded their third consecutive win against Grimsby Town. On 21 April Chelsea once again performed poorly, losing 3–1 at home to Gainsborough Trinity, despite going into the lead through Mackie after 10 minutes. The Trinity goals coming via Smith 2 minutes before half-time and Morley with half an hour left, who later added a third. To add insult to injury McRobert had a penalty saved by Bagshaw. This loss coupled with Manchester United's victory over Leeds City, clinched the promotion spot for Manchester United. Bristol City also won their match against Burton United to win the Second Division title. Thus Chelsea, who began April with a strong chance of promotion completely faded away, failing to win four matches in a row, condemning themselves to a 3rd-place finish, and another season in the second tier. In their final match of the season on 28 April, Chelsea travelled to Ashton Gate to face newly crowned champions Bristol City. In a close affair the champions came away with a 2–1 victory with goals from Gilligan in the 10th minutes and Burton in the 57th, with Chelsea grabbing a late goal 2 minutes from time through Pearson.

== Final league table ==
Pos	Team	Pld	W	D	L	GF	GA	GAv	Pts	Promotion
1	Bristol City (C, P)	38	30	6	2	83	28	2.964	66	Promotion to the First Division
2	Manchester United (P)	38	28	6	4	90	28	3.214	62	Promotion to the First Division
3	Chelsea	38	22	9	7	90	37	2.432	53	
4	West Bromwich Albion	38	22	8	8	79	36	2.194	52	
5	Hull City	38	19	6	13	67	54	1.241	44	

(C) Champions; (P) Promoted

== Results ==
=== Legend ===
Win	Draw	Loss

=== Football League Second Division ===
2 September 1905 1	Stockport County	1–0	Chelsea	Stockport
15:30 GMT	Dodd 60'			Stadium: Edgeley Park; Attendance: 7,000; Referee: D Hammond

9 September 1905 2	Blackpool	0–1	Chelsea	Blackpool
15:00 GMT			J.T. Robertson 80'	Stadium: Bloomfield Road; Attendance: 4,000; Referee: R Wild

11 September 1905 3	Chelsea	5–1	Hull City	Fulham, London
17:00 GMT	Copeland 15' 40'; Windridge 55' 58' 6th		Howe 5th	Stadium: Stamford Bridge; Attendance: 6,000; Referee: F Gardner

16 September 1905 4	Bradford City	1–1	Chelsea	Bradford
15:30 GMT	Smith 62'		McRoberts 85'	Stadium: Valley Parade; Attendance: 17,000; Referee: A Kingscott

23 September 1905 5	Chelsea	1–0	West Bromwich Albion	Fulham, London
15:15 GMT	McRoberts 25'			Stadium: Stamford Bridge; Attendance: 10,123; Referee: T.P. Campbell

30 September 1905 6	Leicester Fosse	0–1	Chelsea	Leicester
15:30 GMT			J. Robertson 10'	Stadium: Filbert Street; Attendance: 7,000; Referee: J.H. Strawson

14 October 1905 7	Lincoln City	1–4	Chelsea	Lincoln
15:00 GMT	Watson 85'		Windridge 30'; Pearson 32' 75'; McRoberts 3rd	Stadium: Sincil Bank; Attendance: 3,000; Referee: J.H. Smith

21 October 1905 8	Chelsea	0–1	Chesterfield Town	Fulham, London
15:00 GMT			Ball 55'	Stadium: Stamford Bridge; Attendance: 10,000; Referee: A.E. Farrant

30 October 1905 9	Burslem Port Vale	3–2	Chelsea	Cobridge
	Price 9'; Croxton 51'; Carter 78'		Windridge 3rd Moran 85'	Stadium: Athletic Ground; Attendance: 5,000; Referee: J.T. Howcroft

4 November 1905 10	Chelsea	6–0	Barnsley	Fulham, London
15:00 GMT	Pearson 25' 75'; Copeland 26'; McDermott 32' 90'; McRoberts 40' (pen.)			Stadium: Stamford Bridge; Attendance: 8,000; Referee: F Heath

11 November 1905 11	Clapton Orient	0–3	Chelsea	Clapton, London
15:00 GMT			Pearson 43' 75'; Copeland 60'	Stadium: Millfields Road; Attendance: 8,000; Referee: N Whittaker

18 November 1905 12	Chelsea	1–0	Burnley	Fulham, London
14:30 GMT	McRoberts 70'			Stadium: Stamford Bridge; Attendance: 8,000; Referee: J.B. Brodie

25 November 1905 13	Leeds City	0–0	Chelsea	Leeds
14:30 GMT				Stadium: Elland Road; Attendance: 20,000; Referee: T. Robertson

2 December 1905 14	Chelsea	3–0	Burton United	Fulham, London
14:30 GMT	J. Robertson 20'; McDermott 2nd Moran 40'			Stadium: Stamford Bridge; Attendance: 7,000; Referee: F. Heath

9 December 1905 15	Chelsea	2–0	Grimsby Town	Fulham, London
14:15 GMT	McDermott 80'; Kirwan 85'			Stadium: Stamford Bridge; Attendance: 7,000; Referee: A.E. Farrant

16 December 1905 16	Gainsborough Trinity	0–2	Chelsea	Gainsborough
			J. Robertson 20'; Hall o.g.' 2nd	Stadium: The Northolme; Attendance: 8,000; Referee: D Hammond

23 December 1905 17	Chelsea	0–0	Bristol City	Fulham, London
14:30 GMT				Stadium: Stamford Bridge; Attendance: 25,000; Referee: A Green

25 December 1905 18	Manchester United	0–0	Chelsea	Manchester
14:20 GMT				Stadium: Bank Street; Attendance: 35,000; Referee: T Kirkham

26 December 1905 19	Glossop	2–4	Chelsea	Glossop
14:30 GMT	Cuffe 40'; Cameron 5th		McRoberts 15'; Kirwan 2nd 65'; J.T. Roberston 6th	Stadium: North Road; Attendance: 6,000; Referee: T Armitt

30 December 1905 20	Chelsea	4–2	Stockport County	Fulham, London
14:15 GMT	J. Robertson 2nd 3rd 5th Pearson 6th		Pass 15'; Waters 47'	Stadium: Stamford Bridge; Attendance: 12,000; Referee: D Heywood

6 January 1906 21	Chelsea	6–0	Blackpool	Fulham, London
14:30 GMT	Kirwan 20'; J. Robertson 30'; Pearson 38' 67'; Moran 45'; J.T. Roberston 55'			Stadium: Stamford Bridge; Attendance: 6,000; Referee: A Green

=== FA Cup ===
Win Draw Loss

7 October 1905 1st Q. Round	Chelsea	6–1	1st Grenadier Guards	Fulham, London
15:30 GMT	O'Hara 2'; J. Robertson 7'; O'Hara 15'; Moran 40'; Windridge 6th 80'		Stanley 50'	Stadium: Stamford Bridge; Attendance: 5,000; Referee: R Beckley

28 October 1905 2nd Q. Round	Southern United	0–1	Chelsea	Nunhead, London
15:00 GMT			McDermott 30'	Stadium: Brown's Ground; Attendance: 7,000; Referee: C.C. Fallowfield

18 November 1905 3rd Q. Round	Crystal Palace	7–1	Chelsea	Penge, Kent
14:30 GMT	Innerd 1st Innerd 2nd Watkins 3rd pen' 4th 7th Needham 5th Harker 6th		O'Hara 8th	Stadium: Crystal Palace; Attendance: 3,000; Referee: G.W. Simmons

== First team squad ==
Squad No.	Name	Nationality	Position(s)	Date of birth	Age*
Goalkeepers
-	Micky Byrne	Ireland	GK	20 March 1880	25
-	Bill Foulke	(England)	GK	12 April 1874	31
-	Bob Whiting	(England)	GK	6 January 1884	20
Defenders
-	James Fletcher	(England)	DF	21 March 1886	19
-	Charles Harris	(England)	DF	1 December 1885	19
-	Bob Mackie	(Scotland)	DF	25 August 1879	26
-	Bob McEwan	(Scotland)	DF	1881	23-24
-	Tommy Miller	(Scotland)	DF	1883	21-22
Midfielders
-	Jim Craigie	(Scotland)	MF	1882	22-23
-	George Henderson	(Scotland)	MF	2 May 1880	25
-	George Key	(Scotland)	MF	11 February 1882	23
-	Bob McRoberts	(Scotland)	MF	29 June 1874	31
-	Peter Proudfoot	(Scotland)	MF	25 November 1882	22
-	Jacky Robertson	(Scotland)	MF	25 February 1877	28
-	James Watson	(Scotland)	MF	1883	21-22
-	Frank Wolff	(England)	MF	?	?
Forwards
-	David Copeland	(Scotland)	FW	2 April 1875	30
-	Charles Donaghy	(Scotland)	FW	1883	21-22
-	Joe Goodwin	(England)	FW	1883	21-22
-	Jack Kirwan	Ireland	FW	2 December 1872	32
-	Tommy McDermott	(Scotland)	FW	12 January 1878	27
-	Martin Moran	(Scotland)	FW	19 December 1879	25
-	Francis O'Hara	(Scotland)	FW	?	?
-	Frank Pearson	(England)	FW	18 May 1884	21
-	Willie Porter	(England)	FW	1884	20-21
-	Jimmy Robertson	(Scotland)	FW	1880	24-25
-	Walter Toomer	(England)	FW	9 February 1883	22
-	Jimmy Windridge	(England)	FW	21 October 1882	22

- On 1 September 1905

== Squad statistics ==
Pos.	Name	League		FA Cup		Total	
Pos.	Name	Apps	Goals	Apps	Goals	Apps	Goals
GK	Micky Byrne	3	0	1	0	4	0
GK	(England) Bill Foulke	34	0	1	0	35	0
GK	(England) Bob Whiting	1	0	0	0	1	0
DF	(England) James Fletcher	1	0	0	0	1	0
DF	(England) Charles Harris	1	0	1	0	2	0
DF	(Scotland) Bob Mackie	35	1	2	0	37	1
DF	(Scotland) Bob McEwan	19	0	1	0	20	0
DF	(Scotland) Tommy Miller	24	0	2	0	26	0
MF	(Scotland) Jim Craigie	0	0	2	0	2	0
MF	(Scotland) George Henderson	3	0	0	0	3	0
MF	(Scotland) George Key	33	1	2	0	35	1
MF	(Scotland) Bob McRoberts	34	9	1	0	35	9
MF	(Scotland) Peter Proudfoot	4	0	0	0	4	0
MF	(Scotland) Jacky Robertson	33	7	3	0	36	7
MF	(Scotland) James Watson	13	0	1	0	14	0
MF	(England) Frank Wolff	0	0	1	0	1	0
FW	(Scotland) David Copeland	20	5	0	0	20	5
FW	(Scotland) Charles Donaghy	1	1	1	0	2	1
FW	(England) Joe Goodwin	0	0	2	0	2	0
FW	Jack Kirwan	36	8	1	0	37	8
FW	(Scotland) Tommy McDermott	22	8	1	1	23	9
FW	(Scotland) Martin Moran	34	4	2	1	36	5
FW	(Scotland) Francis O'Hara	1	0	2	3	3	3
FW	(Scotland) Jimmy Robertson	16	13	2	1	18	14
FW	(England) Frank Pearson	29	18	1	0	30	18
FW	(England) Willie Porter	1	0	0	0	1	0
FW	(England) Walter Toomer	0	0	1	0	1	0
FW	(England) Jimmy Windridge	20	14	2	2	22	16
