= List of Chelsea F.C. players (25–99 appearances) =

Chelsea Football Club are an association football club based in Fulham, West London. Founded in 1905, they play in the Premier League. Below is a list of all the players who made between 25 and 99 appearances for the club.

== Key ==
- Appearances as a substitute are included. This feature of the game was introduced in the Football League at the start of the 1965–66 season.

Positions key
Pre-1960s		1960s–	
GK	Goalkeeper		
FB	Full back	DF	Defender
HB	Half back	MF	Midfielder
FW	Forward		

Nationality
The nationality of a player is determined by the country which he has played for during their Chelsea career, or if said person has not played international football, their country of birth.
Position
Playing positions are listed according to the tactical formations that were employed at the time. Thus the change in the names of defensive and midfield positions reflects the tactical evolution that occurred from the 1960s onwards.
Club career
Club career is defined as the first and last calendar years in which the player signed for and left Chelsea.
Total appearances and Total goals
Total appearances and goals comprise those in the Football League, Premier League, FA Cup, Football League Cup, FA Charity / Community Shield, European Cup / UEFA Champions League, UEFA Cup / UEFA Europa League, UEFA Conference League, Inter-Cities Fairs Cup, European Cup Winners' Cup / UEFA Cup Winners' Cup, Full Members' Cup, UEFA Super Cup and FIFA Club World Cup. Matches in friendlies and wartime competitions are excluded.

== Players ==
- **Bold** indicates players currently playing for the club.
- † indicates players who are currently out on loan.
- Italic indicates players who are academy graduates.

As of 21 November 2026

List of Chelsea F.C. players with between 25 and 99 appearances
Player	Nationality	Pos	Club career	Starts	Subs	Total	Goals
Player	Nationality	Pos	Club career	Appearances			Goals
David Copeland	Scotland	FW	1905–1906	26	0	26	9
Tommy McDermott	Scotland	FW	1905–1906	33	0	33	12
Frank Pearson	England	FW	1905–1906	30	0	30	18
John Tait Robertson	Scotland	HB	1905–1906	38	0	38	7
William Foulke	England	GK	1905–1907	35	0	35	0
Bob Mackie	Scotland	FB	1905–1907	48	0	48	1
Jimmy Robertson	Scotland	FW	1905–1907	32	0	32	22
Jack Kirwan	Ireland	FW	1905–1908	75	0	75	16
Martin Moran	Scotland	FW	1905–1908	65	0	65	7
George Key	Scotland	HB	1905–1909	56	0	56	2
Bob Whiting	England	GK	1906–1908	54	0	54	0
George Henderson	Scotland	MF	1906–1909	64	0	64	1
Joe Walton	England	FB	1906–1911	53	0	53	0
James Stark	Scotland	DF	1907–1908	32	0	32	2
Percy Humphreys	England	FW	1907–1909	46	0	46	13
Fred Rouse	England	FW	1907–1909	42	0	42	11
Billy Brawn	England	FW	1907–1911	99	0	99	11
Norrie Fairgray	Scotland	FW	1907–1914	84	0	84	5
Bill Cartwright	England	FB	1908–1912	46	0	46	0
Marshall McEwan	Scotland	FW	1910–1911	35	0	35	3
George Dodd	England	FW	1911–1913	31	0	31	8
David Calderhead Jr.	Scotland	HB	1911–1914	42	0	42	1
Bob Thomson	England	FW	1911–1922	95	0	95	30
Jimmy Sharp	Scotland	FB	1912–1915	63	0	63	0
George Hunter	England	HB	1913–1914	32	0	32	2
Owen Marshall	England	DF	1913–1921	36	0	36	0
Nils Middelboe	Denmark	HB	1913–1923	46	0	46	1
Laurence Abrams	England	HB	1914–1920	49	0	49	7
Colin Hampton	Scotland	GK	1914–1925	82	0	82	0
Bill Dickie	England	FW	1919–1921	40	0	40	0
George Dale	England	FW	1919–1922	52	0	52	1
Buchanan Sharp	Scotland	FW	1919–1923	72	0	72	23
Jimmy Ferris	Ireland	FW	1920–1922	39	0	39	9
John Bell	England	FW	1920–1923	44	0	44	10
Fred Linfoot	England	FW	1920–1923	41	0	41	1
David Cameron	Scotland	HB	1920–1926	81	0	81	2
Fred Barrett	England	FB	1920–1927	70	0	70	6
Frank Hoddinott	England	FW	1921–1923	32	0	32	4
Benjamin Howard Baker	England	GK	1921–1926	93	0	93	1
Jimmy Armstrong	England	FW	1922–1925	32	0	32	10
Jimmy Frew	Scotland	FB	1922–1926	43	0	43	0
Sid Castle	England	FW	1923–1924	33	0	33	2
William Whitton	England	FW	1923–1926	39	0	39	18
Seth Plum	England	HB	1924–1926	27	0	27	1
Billy Brown	England	FW	1924–1929	57	0	57	21
Peter McKenna	England	GK	1924–1931	66	0	66	0
George Stone	England	FW	1925–1927	25	0	25	2
Bob Turnbull	Scotland	FW	1925–1928	87	0	87	58
James Thompson	England	FW	1927–1928	42	0	42	32
George Biswell	England	HB	1928–1929	25	0	25	9
Sidney Elliot	England	FW	1928–1930	30	0	30	9
William Jackson	England	FW	1928–1931	26	0	26	6
Sam Irving	Ireland	FW	1928–1932	97	0	97	5
Alex Jackson	Scotland	FW	1930–1932	77	0	77	30
Alec Cheyne	Scotland	FW	1930–1932; 1934–1936	69	0	69	13
Johnnie Rankin	Scotland	FW	1930–1934	66	0	66	9
Wilf Chitty	England	FW	1930–1938	45	0	45	16
Peter O'Dowd	England	FB	1931–1935	86	0	86	0
Bob Griffiths	Scotland	DF	1931–1941	45	0	45	0
Bob McAuley	Scotland	FB	1932–1936	74	0	74	1
Tommy Priestley	Ireland	FW	1933–1934	27	0	27	2
Peter Buchanan	Scotland	FW	1933–1934; 1935–1946	40	0	40	6
Jack Horton	England	HB	1933–1937	66	0	66	15
Bob Gregg	England	FW	1933–1938	50	0	50	6
John Jackson	Scotland	GK	1933–1939	51	0	51	0
Bill Barraclough	England	HB	1934–1937	81	0	81	11
Joe Bambrick	Ireland	FW	1935–1938	66	0	66	38
Dick Foss	England	HB	1936–1948	48	0	48	3
Ned Barkas	England	FB	1937–1939	28	0	28	0
Alf Hanson	England	MF	1938–1939	43	0	43	9
Joe Payne	England	HB	1938–1945	47	0	47	22
Bob Salmond	Scotland	DF	1938–1945	29	0	29	0
Jack Smith	Wales	FB	1938–1945	49	0	49	0
Alex Machin	England	FW	1944–1948	61	0	61	9
Jimmy Bowie	England	FW	1944–1951	84	0	84	22
Tommy Lawton	England	FW	1945–1947	53	0	53	35
Bill Robertson	England	GK	1945–1948	43	0	43	0
Reg Williams	England	HB	1945–1951	74	0	74	17
Len Dolding	England	FW	1946–1948	27	0	27	2
James Macaulay	Scotland	FW	1946–1951	94	0	94	5
Fred Lewis	England	FB	1946–1953	26	0	26	0
John McInnes	Scotland	FW	1947–1950	37	0	37	7
Charlie Dyke	England	FW	1947–1951	25	0	25	2
Benny Jones	England	FW	1947–1953	62	0	62	13
Phil McKnight	Scotland	FW	1947–1954	33	0	33	1
Hugh Billington	England	FW	1948–1951	89	0	89	32
Peter Pickering	England	GK	1948–1951	35	0	35	0
Frank Mitchell	Australia	MF	1949–1952	85	0	85	1
Jack Saunders	England	DF	1949–1954	60	0	60	0
Bobby Smith	England	FW	1950–1955	86	0	86	30
Jimmy D'Arcy	Northern Ireland	FW	1951–1952	31	0	31	13
Sid Tickridge	England	FB	1951–1952	73	0	73	0
Alan Dicks	England	HB	1951–1958	38	0	38	1
Ron Greenwood	England	FB	1952–1955	66	0	66	0
Charlie Thomson	Scotland	GK	1952–1957	59	0	59	0
Jim Lewis	England	FW	1952–1958	95	0	95	40
Dick Whittaker	Republic of Ireland	DF	1952–1960	51	0	51	0
Stan Wicks	England	FB	1954–1957	81	0	81	1
Wally Bellett	England	FB	1954–1958	35	0	35	1
Len Casey	England	HB	1954–1958	37	0	37	0
Les Allen	England	FW	1954–1959	49	0	49	11
Brian Nicholas	Wales	MF	1955–1957	29	0	29	1
Ian MacFarlane	Scotland	FB	1956–1958	43	0	43	0
Tony Nicholas	England	FW	1956–1960	63	0	63	20
Derek Gibbs	England	FW	1957–1960	25	0	25	6
Micky Block	England	FW	1957–1962	40	0	40	6
Terry Bradbury	England	HB	1957–1962	29	0	29	1
Mike Harrison	England	FW	1957–1963	64	0	64	9
Sylvan Anderton	England	HB	1958–1961	82	0	82	2
Stan Crowther	England	HB	1958–1961	58	0	58	0
Johnny Brooks	England	FW	1959–1961	52	0	52	7
Charlie Livesey	England	FW	1959–1961	42	0	42	18
Bobby Evans	Scotland	MF	1960–1961	37	0	37	1
Andy Malcolm	England	MF	1961–1962	28	0	28	1
Graham Moore	Wales	MF	1961–1963	72	0	72	14
Frank Upton	England	DF	1961–1965	86	0	86	3
Allan Young	England	DF	1961–1968	26	0	26	1
Joe Fascione	Scotland	MF	1962–1969	27	7	34	1
Jim Thomson	Scotland	DF	1965–1968	40	7	47	1
Tony Hateley	England	FW	1966–1967	32	1	33	9
Joe Kirkup	England	DF	1966–1967	62	7	69	2
Alan Birchenall	England	FW	1967–1970	95	1	96	28
Paddy Mulligan	Republic of Ireland	DF	1969–1972	74	5	79	2
Keith Weller	England	MF	1970–1971	49	5	54	15
Teddy Maybank	England	FW	1974–1977	32	0	32	6
Steve Finnieston	Scotland	FW	1974–1978	86	4	90	37
John Sparrow	England	DF	1974–1981	68	6	74	2
Ray Lewington	England	MF	1975–1979	87	5	92	4
Trevor Aylott	England	MF	1976–1979	29	3	32	2
David Stride	England	DF	1978–1980	37	0	37	0
Micky Nutton	England	DF	1978–1983	81	2	83	0
Eamonn Bannon	Scotland	FW	1979	27	0	27	1
Kevin Hales	England	MF	1979–1983	25	2	27	2
Dennis Rofe	England	DF	1980–1982	61	2	63	0
Phil Driver	England	MF	1980–1983	25	21	46	4
Alan Mayes	England	FW	1980–1983	71	5	76	23
Steve Francis	England	GK	1981–1987	88	0	88	0
Joey Jones	Wales	DF	1982–1985	89	2	91	2
Keith Dublin	England	DF	1983–1987	66	2	68	0
Keith Jones	England	MF	1983–1987	57	12	69	10
Mickey Thomas	Wales	MF	1984–1985	53	1	54	11
Jerry Murphy	Republic of Ireland	MF	1985–1988	39	0	39	3
Tony Godden	England	GK	1986–1987	38	0	38	0
Roy Wegerle	South Africa	FW	1986–1988	18	10	28	4
Roger Freestone	Wales	GK	1987–1991	53	0	53	0
Graham Roberts	England	DF	1988–1990	83	0	83	22
Peter Nicholas	Wales	MF	1988–1991	92	1	93	2
Jason Cundy	England	DF	1988–1992	56	1	57	2
Alan Dickens	England	MF	1989–1993	46	9	55	4
Damian Matthew	England	MF	1989–1994	19	8	27	0
Darren Barnard	Wales	MF	1990–1995	20	13	33	2
Tom Boyd	Scotland	DF	1991–1992	31	1	32	0
Vinnie Jones	England	DF	1991–1992	52	0	52	7
Paul Elliott	England	DF	1991–1994	54	0	54	3
Mick Harford	England	FW	1992–1993	33	1	34	11
Tony Cascarino	Republic of Ireland	FW	1992–1994	39	6	45	8
Mal Donaghy	Northern Ireland	DF	1992–1994	72	6	78	3
Robert Fleck	Scotland	FW	1992–1995	43	5	48	4
David Hopkin	Scotland	MF	1992–1995	24	22	46	1
Neil Shipperley	England	FW	1992–1995	35	13	48	9
Glenn Hoddle	England	MF	1993–1995	22	17	39	1
Jakob Kjeldbjerg	Denmark	DF	1993–1997	65	1	66	2
Mark Stein	South Africa	FW	1993–1998	57	6	63	25
Paul Furlong	England	FW	1994–1996	59	26	85	17
Scott Minto	England	DF	1994–1997	70	2	72	5
David Rocastle	England	FW	1994–1998	37	3	40	2
Ruud Gullit	Netherlands	MF	1995–1998	50	14	64	7
Mark Nicholls	England	FW	1995–2001	16	36	52	3
Frode Grodås	Norway	GK	1996–1998	26	1	27	0
Gianluca Vialli	Italy	FW	1996–1999	69	19	88	40
Danny Granville	England	DF	1997–1998	19	7	26	1
Jon Harley	England	DF	1997–2001	30	12	42	2
Bernard Lambourde	France	DF	1997–2001	43	17	60	3
Bjarne Goldbaek	Denmark	MF	1998–2000	21	19	40	5
Mikael Forssell	Finland	MF	1998–2005	12	41	53	12
Didier Deschamps	France	MF	1999–2000	44	3	47	1
Chris Sutton	England	FW	1999–2000	27	12	39	3
Sam Dalla Bona	Italy	MF	1999–2002	51	22	73	6
Slaviša Jokanović	Croatia	MF	2000–2002	28	25	53	0
Mario Stanic	Croatia	FW	2000–2004	54	26	80	10
Emmanuel Petit	France	MF	2001–2004	71	5	76	3
Boudewijn Zenden	Netherlands	MF	2001–2004	30	29	59	4
Carlton Cole	England	FW	2001–2006	6	26	32	8
Quique de Lucas	Spain	FW	2002–2003	21	10	31	1
Robert Huth	Germany	DF	2002–2006	32	30	62	2
Adrian Mutu	Romania	FW	2003–2004	30	8	38	10
Alexey Smertin	Russia	MF	2003–2006	19	6	25	1
Glen Johnson	England	DF	2003–2007	61	11	72	4
Hernan Crespo	Argentina	FW	2003–2008	47	26	73	25
Mateja Kezman	Serbia	FW	2004–2005	14	27	41	7
Tiago Mendes	Portugal	MF	2004–2005	31	21	52	4
Scott Parker	England	MF	2004–2005	19	9	28	1
Asier Del Horno	Spain	DF	2005–2006	32	2	34	1
Lassana Diarra	France	DF	2005–2007	21	10	31	0
Andriy Shevchenko	Ukraine	FW	2006–2009	53	24	77	22
Hilário	Portugal	GK	2006–2014	35	4	39	0
Ryan Bertrand	England	DF	2006–2015	42	15	57	2
Steve Sidwell	England	MF	2007–2008	13	12	25	1
Claudio Pizarro	Peru	FW	2007–2009	10	22	32	2
Juliano Belletti	Brazil	DF	2007–2010	54	40	94	5
Deco	Portugal	MF	2008–2010	42	16	58	6
Yuri Zhirkov	Russia	DF	2009–2011	32	17	49	1
Daniel Sturridge	England	FW	2009–2013	49	47	96	24
Raul Meireles	Portugal	MF	2011–2012	38	10	48	6
Romelu Lukaku	Belgium	FW	2011–2014; 2021–2024	33	26	59	15
Oriol Romeu	Spain	MF	2011–2015	24	9	33	1
Demba Ba	Senegal	FW	2013–2014	23	28	51	14
Samuel Eto'o	Cameroon	FW	2013–2014	26	9	35	12
André Schürrle	Germany	FW	2013–2015	35	30	65	14
Filipe Luís	Brazil	DF	2014–2015	20	6	26	1
Loïc Rémy	France	FW	2014–2017	16	31	47	12
Asmir Begović	Bosnia and Herzegovina	GK	2015–2017	31	2	33	0
Kenedy	Brazil	MF	2015–2022	15	15	30	3
Tammy Abraham	England	FW	2016–2021	51	31	82	30
Fikayo Tomori	England	DF	2016–2021	23	4	27	2
Michy Batshuayi	Belgium	FW	2016–2022	23	54	77	25
Alvaro Morata	Spain	FW	2017–2020	48	24	72	24
Willy Caballero	Argentina	GK	2017–2021	38	0	38	0
Davide Zappacosta	Italy	DF	2017–2021	34	18	52	2
Tiémoué Bakayoko	France	DF	2017–2023	34	9	43	3
Emerson Palmieri	Italy	DF	2018–2022	54	17	71	2
Conor Gallagher	England	MF	2019–2024	67	28	95	10
Timo Werner	Germany	FW	2020–2022	68	21	89	23
Armando Broja	Albania	FW	2020–2025	11	27	38	3
**Levi Colwill**	England	DF	2021–	82	9	91	3
Kalidou Koulibaly	Senegal	DF	2022–2023	29	3	32	2
Carney Chukwuemeka	England	MF	2022–2025	5	27	32	2
Raheem Sterling	England	FW	2022–2026	62	19	81	19
**Wesley Fofana**	France	DF	2022–	70	11	81	2
João Félix	Portugal	FW	2023; 2024–2025	23	17	40	11
Noni Madueke	England	FW	2023–2025	60	32	92	20
Christopher Nkunku	France	MF	2023–2025	27	35	62	18
Đorđe Petrović	Serbia	GK	2023–2025	30	1	31	0
Nicolas Jackson	Senegal	FW	2023–2026	70	11	81	30
Andrey Santos	Brazil	MF	2023–2026	26	21	47	3
**Benoît Badiashile** †	France	DF	2023–	61	10	71	2
**Axel Disasi** †	France	DF	2023–	56	5	61	5
**Roméo Lavia**	Belgium	MF	2023–	33	21	54	1
**Mykhailo Mudryk** †	Ukraine	FW	2023–	40	33	73	10
Kiernan Dewsbury-Hall	England	MF	2024–2025	19	17	36	5
Jadon Sancho	England	FW	2024–2025	26	15	41	5
Tosin Adarabioyo	England	DF	2024–2026	50	20	70	7
Tyrique George	England	FW	2024–2026	15	22	37	6
Marc Guiu	Spain	FW	2024–2026	12	17	29	8
**Josh Acheampong**	England	DF	2024–	34	22	56	2
**Filip Jörgensen** †	Denmark	GK	2024–	34	2	36	0
Liam Delap	England	FW	2025–2026	20	27	47	3
**Estêvão**	Brazil	FW	2025–	24	23	47	8
**Alejandro Garnacho** †	Argentina	MF	2025–	22	21	43	8
**Jamie Gittens**	England	FW	2025–	13	16	29	1
**Jorrel Hato**	Netherlands	DF	2025–	31	12	43	2
**João Pedro**	Brazil	FW	2025–	50	10	60	28

== See also ==
- List of Chelsea F.C. players
- List of Chelsea F.C. players (1–24 appearances)
