= Chelsea F.C. Player of the Season =

Football award

Chelsea Player of the Season
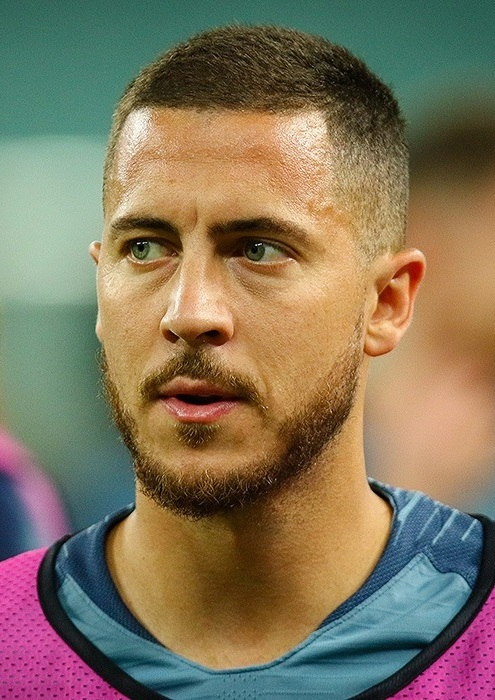
- Eden Hazard has won the award four times, the most of any player
- Sport: Association football
- Awarded for: Being the best performing Chelsea player in a year
- Presented by: Chelsea F.C.

History
- First award: 1967; 59 years ago
- Editions: 60 (as of 2026)
- First winner: (England) Peter Bonetti
- Most wins: (Belgium) Eden Hazard (4 times)
- Most recent: (Brazil) João Pedro (2026)

The Chelsea Player of the Season award is an official award given by Chelsea Football Club, to award the player who has most contributed to the success and achievements of the club's men's first team over the course of a season. The honor is currently awarded based on votes by Chelsea fans on the club's website.

The inaugural award was handed to Peter Bonetti in 1967, and it has been presented every season since. The award has been given to 44 different players over the course of 60 seasons, with 12 players being awarded on more than one occasion. Of these players, only Eden Hazard has won the award four times. The first player from outside the UK to win the award was Yugoslav international Petar Borota in 1981.

João Pedro is the most recent winner of the award.

== Chelsea Player of the Season ==
=== Award recipients ===
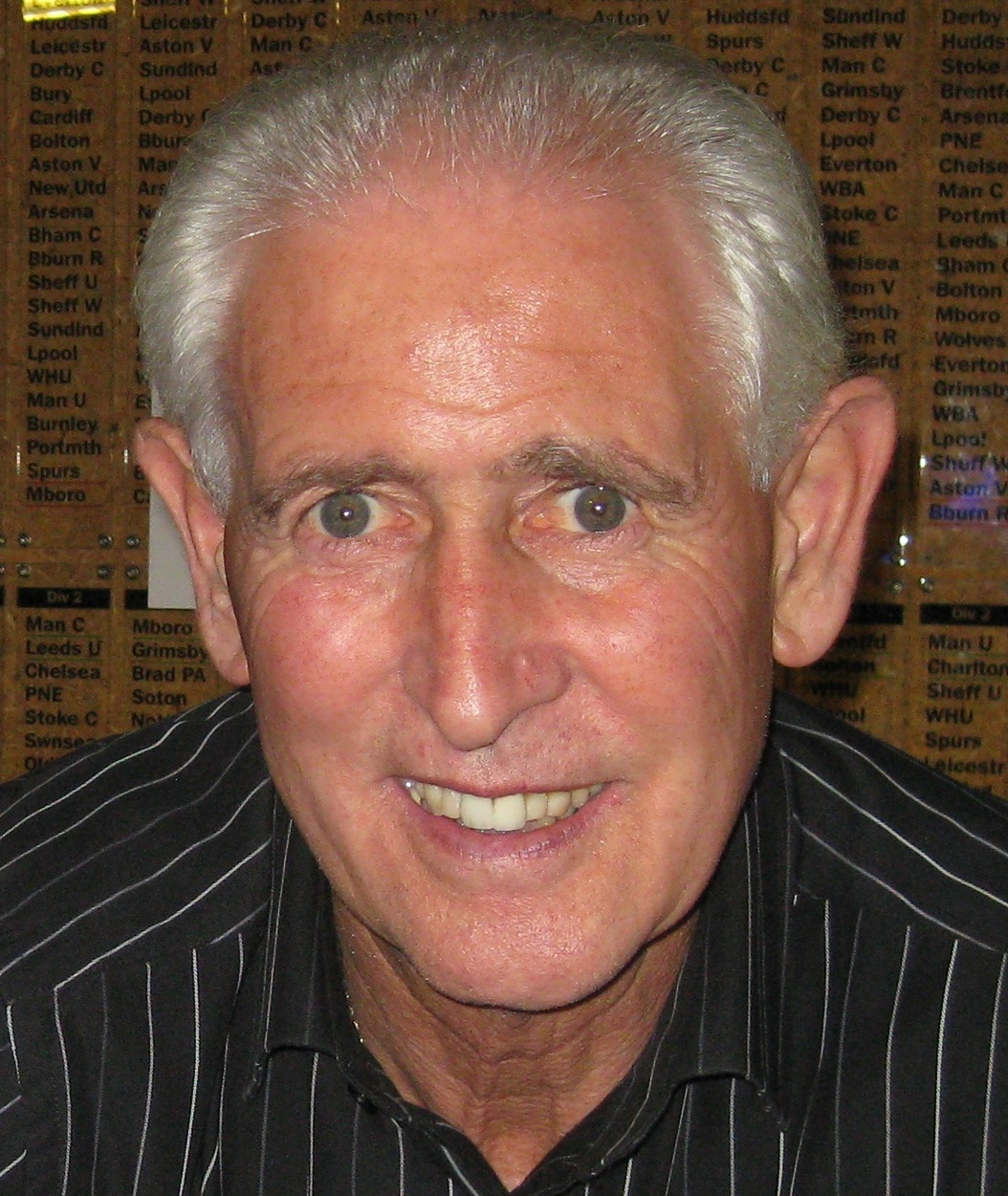
Peter Bonetti won the inaugural award in 1967.

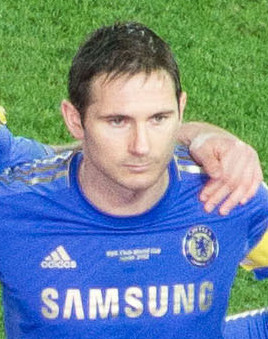
Frank Lampard has won the award three times.

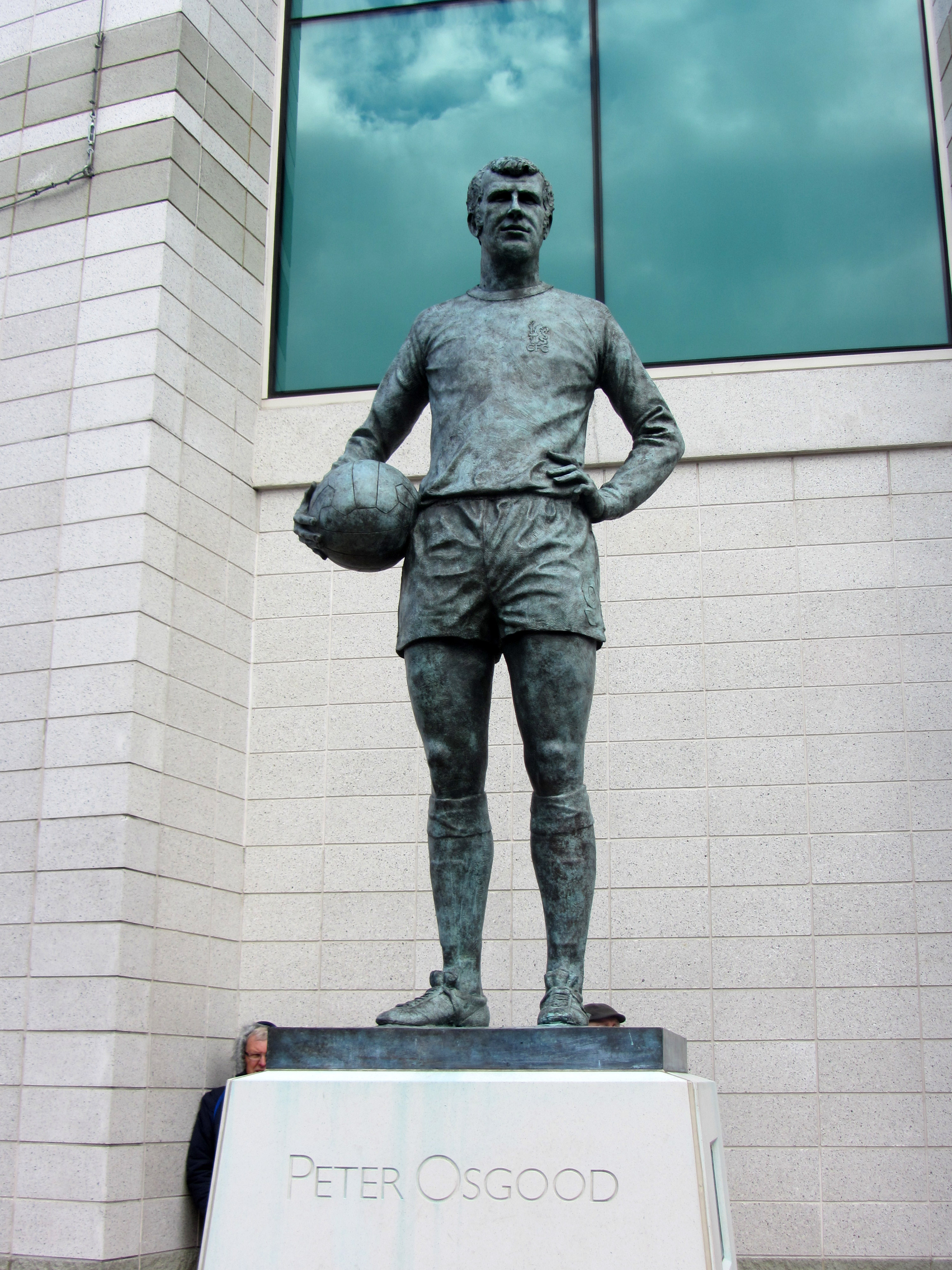
Statue of Peter Osgood outside Stamford Bridge, who won the award in 1973.

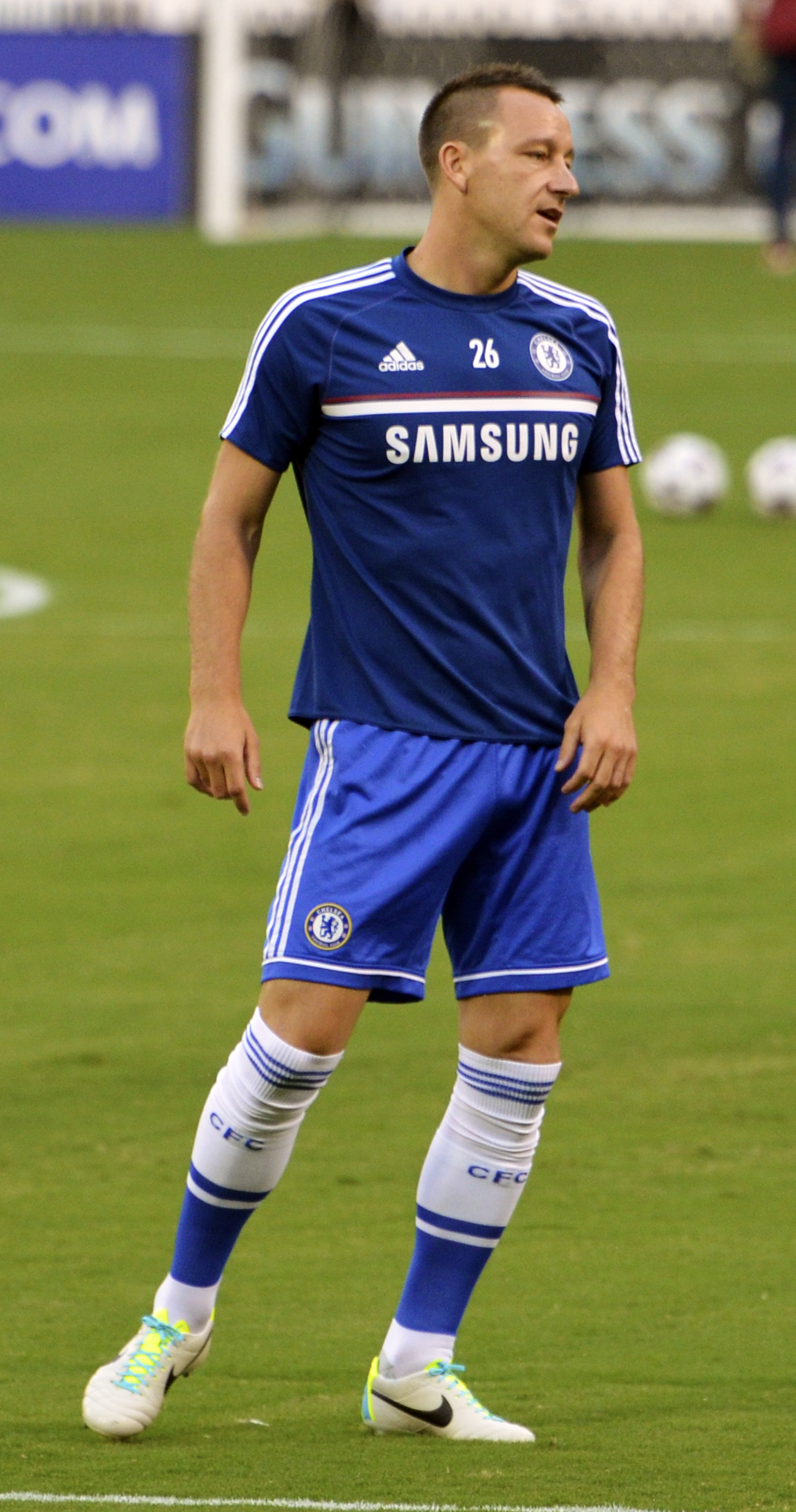
John Terry won the award in 2001 and 2006.

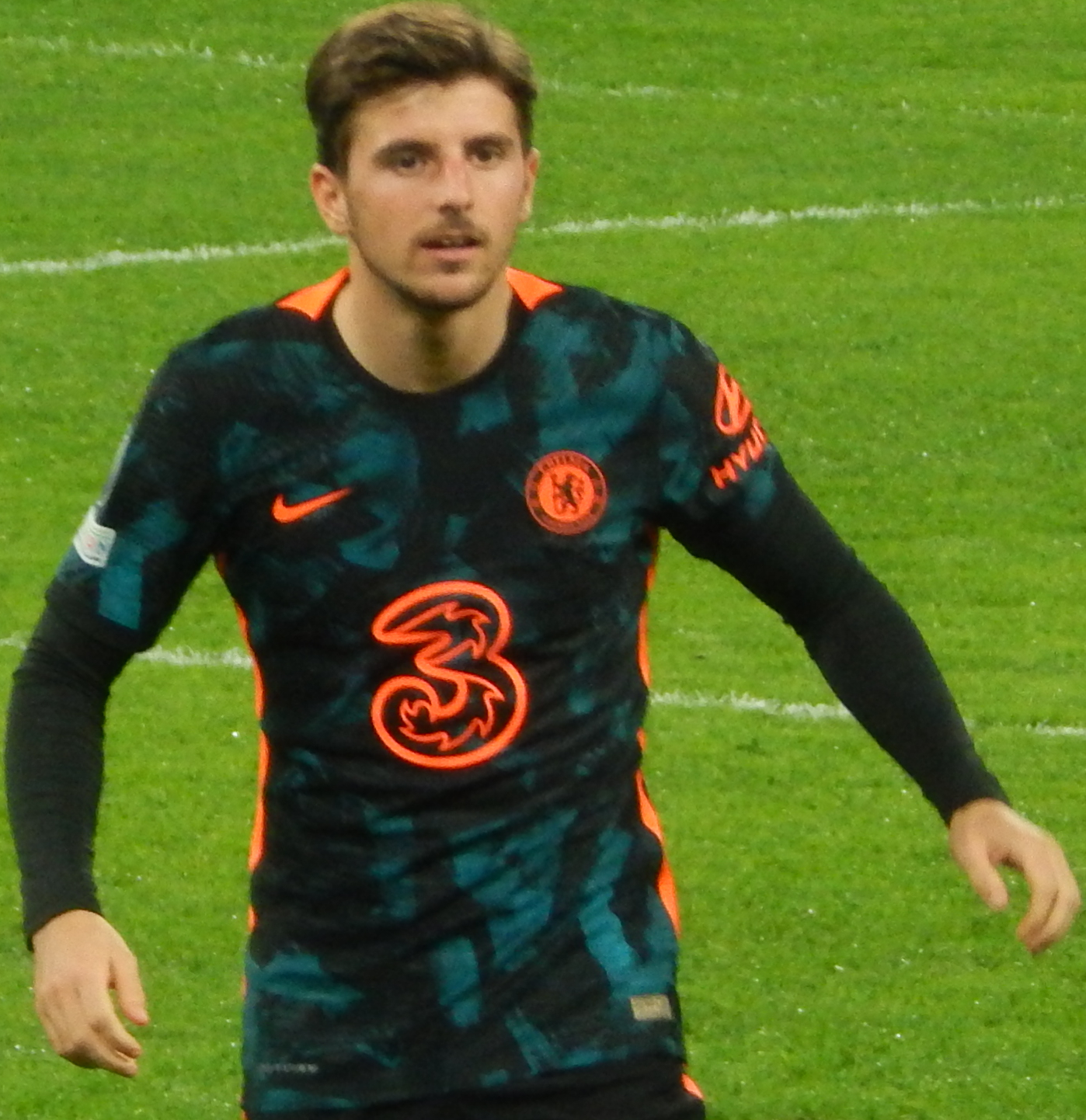
Mason Mount won the award in successive years, in 2021 and 2022.

Award recipients
| Year | Player | Nationality | Position | Ref. |
|---|---|---|---|---|
| 1967 | Peter Bonetti | England | Goalkeeper | |
| 1968 | Charlie Cooke | Scotland | Forward | |
| 1969 | David Webb | England | Defender | |
| 1970 | John Hollins | England | Midfielder | |
| 1971 | John Hollins (2) | England | Midfielder | |
| 1972 | David Webb (2) | England | Defender | |
| 1973 | Peter Osgood | England | Forward | |
| 1974 | Gary Locke | England | Defender | |
| 1975 | Charlie Cooke (2) | Scotland | Forward | |
| 1976 | Ray Wilkins | England | Midfielder | |
| 1977 | Ray Wilkins (2) | England | Midfielder | |
| 1978 | Micky Droy | England | Defender | |
| 1979 | Tommy Langley | England | Forward | |
| 1980 | Clive Walker | England | Forward | |
| 1981 | Petar Borota | Yugoslavia | Goalkeeper | |
| 1982 | Mike Fillery | England | Forward | |
| 1983 | Joey Jones | Wales | Defender | |
| 1984 | Pat Nevin | Scotland | Forward | |
| 1985 | David Speedie | Scotland | Forward | |
| 1986 | Eddie Niedzwiecki | Wales | Goalkeeper | |
| 1987 | Pat Nevin (2) | Scotland | Forward | |
| 1988 | Tony Dorigo | England | Defender | |
| 1989 | Graham Roberts | England | Defender | |
| 1990 | Ken Monkou | Netherlands | Defender | |
| 1991 | Andy Townsend | Ireland | Midfielder | |
| 1992 | Paul Elliott | England | Defender | |
| 1993 | Frank Sinclair | Jamaica | Defender | |
| 1994 | Steve Clarke | Scotland | Defender | |
| 1995 | Erland Johnsen | Norway | Defender | |
| 1996 | Ruud Gullit | Netherlands | Midfielder | |
| 1997 | Mark Hughes | Wales | Forward | |
| 1998 | Dennis Wise | England | Midfielder | |
| 1999 | Gianfranco Zola | Italy | Forward | |
| 2000 | Dennis Wise (2) | England | Midfielder | |
| 2001 | John Terry | England | Defender | |
| 2002 | Carlo Cudicini | Italy | Goalkeeper | |
| 2003 | Gianfranco Zola (2) | Italy | Forward | |
| 2004 | Frank Lampard | England | Midfielder | |
| 2005 | Frank Lampard (2) | England | Midfielder | |
| 2006 | John Terry (2) | England | Defender | |
| 2007 | Michael Essien | Ghana | Midfielder | |
| 2008 | Joe Cole | England | Midfielder | |
| 2009 | Frank Lampard (3) | England | Midfielder | |
| 2010 | Didier Drogba | Ivory Coast | Forward | |
| 2011 | Petr Čech | Czech Republic | Goalkeeper | |
| 2012 | Juan Mata | Spain | Midfielder | |
| 2013 | Juan Mata (2) | Spain | Midfielder | |
| 2014 | Eden Hazard | Belgium | Forward | |
| 2015 | Eden Hazard (2) | Belgium | Forward | |
| 2016 | Willian | Brazil | Forward | |
| 2017 | Eden Hazard (3) | Belgium | Forward | |
| 2018 | N'Golo Kanté | France | Midfielder | |
| 2019 | Eden Hazard (4) | Belgium | Forward | |
| 2020 | Mateo Kovačić | Croatia | Midfielder | |
| 2021 | Mason Mount | England | Midfielder | |
| 2022 | Mason Mount (2) | England | Midfielder | |
| 2023 | Thiago Silva | Brazil | Defender | |
| 2024 | Cole Palmer | England | Midfielder | |
| 2025 | Moisés Caicedo | Ecuador | Midfielder | |
| 2026 | João Pedro | Brazil | Forward | |

=== Multiple wins ===
Players with multiple wins
| Rank | Winner | Total wins | Years won |
|---|---|---|---|
| 1 | (Belgium) Eden Hazard | 4 | 2014, 2015, 2017, 2019 |
| 2 | (England) Frank Lampard | 3 | 2004, 2005, 2009 |
| 3 | (Scotland) Charlie Cooke | 2 | 1968, 1975 |
| 3 | (England) David Webb | 2 | 1969, 1972 |
| 3 | (England) John Hollins | 2 | 1970, 1971 |
| 3 | (England) Ray Wilkins | 2 | 1976, 1977 |
| 3 | (Scotland) Pat Nevin | 2 | 1984, 1987 |
| 3 | (England) Dennis Wise | 2 | 1998, 2000 |
| 3 | (Italy) Gianfranco Zola | 2 | 1999, 2003 |
| 3 | (England) John Terry | 2 | 2001, 2006 |
| 3 | (Spain) Juan Mata | 2 | 2012, 2013 |
| 3 | (England) Mason Mount | 2 | 2021, 2022 |

=== Wins by nationality ===
Wins by nationality
| Nationality | Number of wins |
|---|---|
| England | 27 |
| Scotland | 6 |
| Belgium | 4 |
| Brazil | 3 |
| Italy | 3 |
| Wales | 3 |
| Netherlands | 2 |
| Spain | 2 |
| Croatia | 1 |
| Czech Republic | 1 |
| Ecuador | 1 |
| France | 1 |
| Ghana | 1 |
| Republic of Ireland | 1 |
| Ivory Coast | 1 |
| Jamaica | 1 |
| Norway | 1 |
| Yugoslavia | 1 |

=== Wins by playing position ===
Wins by playing position
| Position | Number of wins |
|---|---|
| Goalkeeper | 5 |
| Defender | 15 |
| Midfielder | 21 |
| Forward | 19 |

== Annual awards ==
Key

- A number in brackets beside a player's name indicates the number of times they have received the award.

=== Players' Player of the Season ===
| Year | Winner | Ref. |
|---|---|---|
| 2006 | (France) Claude Makélélé | |
| 2007 | (Ivory Coast) Didier Drogba | |
| 2008 | (Portugal) Ricardo Carvalho | |
| 2009 | (England) Ashley Cole | |
| 2010 | (France) Florent Malouda | |
| 2011 | (England) Ashley Cole (2) | |
| 2012 | (Brazil) Ramires | |
| 2013 | (Spain) Juan Mata | |
| 2014 | (Spain) César Azpilicueta | |
| 2015 | (Belgium) Eden Hazard | |
| 2016 | (Brazil) Willian | |
| 2017 | (France) N'Golo Kanté | |
| 2018 | (Brazil) Willian (2) | |
| 2019 | (Belgium) Eden Hazard (2) | |
| 2020–2022 | Not awarded | |
| 2023 | (Brazil) Thiago Silva | |
| 2024 | (England) Cole Palmer | |
| 2025 | (Ecuador) Moisés Caicedo | |

=== Young Player of the Year ===
| Year | Winner | Ref. |
|---|---|---|
| 1983 | (England) Keith Dublin | |
| 1984 | (England) Robert Isaac | |
| 1985 | (England) Gareth Hall | |
| 1986 | (England) Mick Bodley | |
| 1987 | (England) Jason Cundy | |
| 1988 | (Scotland) Eddie Cunnington | |
| 1989–1990 | Not awarded | |
| 1991 | (England) Andy Myers | |
| 1992 | (England) Zeke Rowe | |
| 1993 | (England) Neil Shipperley | |
| 1994 | (England) Mark Nicholls | |
| 1995 | (Republic of Ireland) Chris McCann | |
| 1996 | (England) Jody Morris | |
| 1997 | (England) Nick Crittenden | |
| 1998 | (England) John Terry | |
| 1999 | (Italy) Samuele Dalla Bona | |
| 2000 | (England) Rhys Evans | |
| 2001 | (England) Leon Knight | |
| 2002 | (England) Carlton Cole | |
| 2003 | (Germany) Robert Huth | |
| 2004 | (Germany) Robert Huth (2) | |
| 2005 | (Germany) Robert Huth (3) | |
| 2006 | (France) Lassana Diarra | |
| 2007 | (Nigeria) Mikel John Obi | |
| 2008 | (England) The U18s youth team | |
| 2009 | (England) Michael Mancienne | |
| 2010 | (England) The U18s youth team (2) | |
| 2011 | (England) Josh McEachran | |
| 2012 | (Brazil) Lucas Piazon | |
| 2013 | (Netherlands) Nathan Aké | |
| 2014 | (England) Lewis Baker | |
| 2015 | (France) Kurt Zouma | |
| 2016 | (England) Ruben Loftus-Cheek | |
| 2017 | Not awarded | |
| 2018 | (Denmark) Andreas Christensen | |
| 2019 | (England) Callum Hudson-Odoi | |

=== Academy Player of the Season ===
| Year | Winner | Ref. |
|---|---|---|
| 2015 | (England) Dominic Solanke | |
| 2016 | (England) Fikayo Tomori | |
| 2017 | (England) Mason Mount | |
| 2018 | (England) Reece James | |
| 2019 | (England) Conor Gallagher | |
| 2020 | (Scotland) Billy Gilmour | |
| 2021 | (England) Tino Livramento | |
| 2022 | (England) Harvey Vale | |
| 2023 | (England) Lewis Hall | |
| 2024 | (England) Alfie Gilchrist | |
| 2025 | (England) Tyrique George | |

=== Goal of the Season ===
All results (home and away) list Chelsea's goal tally first.

| Year | Winner | Against | Score | Result | Stadium | Competition | Ref. |
|---|---|---|---|---|---|---|---|
| 2007 | (Ghana) Michael Essien | (England) Arsenal | 1–1 | 1–1 | Stamford Bridge | Premier League | |
| 2008 | (Brazil) Juliano Belletti | (England) Tottenham Hotspur | 1–0 | 2–0 | Stamford Bridge | Premier League | |
| 2009 | (Ghana) Michael Essien (2) | (Spain) Barcelona | 1–0 | 1–1 | Stamford Bridge | UEFA Champions League | |
| 2010 | (England) Ashley Cole | (England) Sunderland | 3–0 | 7–2 | Stamford Bridge | Premier League | |
| 2011 | (Brazil) Ramires | (England) Manchester City | 2–0 | 2–0 | Stamford Bridge | Premier League | |
| 2012 | (Brazil) Ramires (2) | (Spain) Barcelona | 1–2 | 2–2 | Camp Nou | UEFA Champions League | |
| 2013 | (Brazil) Oscar | (Italy) Juventus | 2–0 | 2–2 | Stamford Bridge | UEFA Champions League | |
| 2014 | (England) Lewis Baker | (England) Arsenal U21 | 1–1 | 2–1 | Emirates Stadium | Professional U21 Development League | |
| 2015 | (Brazil) Oscar (2) | (England) Queens Park Rangers | 1–0 | 2–1 | Stamford Bridge | Premier League | |
| 2016 | (Belgium) Eden Hazard | (England) Tottenham Hotspur | 2–2 | 2–2 | Stamford Bridge | Premier League | |
| 2017 | (Belgium) Eden Hazard (2) | (England) Arsenal | 2–0 | 3–1 | Stamford Bridge | Premier League | |
| 2018 | (Brazil) Willian | (England) Brighton & Hove Albion | 2–0 | 4–0 | Falmer Stadium | Premier League | |
| 2019 | (Belgium) Eden Hazard (3) | (England) Liverpool | 2–1 | 2–1 | Anfield | EFL Cup | |
| 2020 | (England) Fikayo Tomori | (England) Wolverhampton Wanderers | 1–0 | 5–2 | Molineux Stadium | Premier League | |
| 2021 | (France) Olivier Giroud | (Spain) Atlético Madrid | 1–0 | 1–0 | Arena Națională | UEFA Champions League | |
| 2022 | (Croatia) Mateo Kovačić | (England) Liverpool | 1–2 | 2–2 | Stamford Bridge | Premier League | |
| 2023 | (England) Conor Gallagher | (England) Crystal Palace | 2–1 | 2–1 | Selhurst Park | Premier League | |
| 2024 | (Ecuador) Moisés Caicedo | (England) Bournemouth | 1–0 | 2–1 | Stamford Bridge | Premier League | |
| 2025 | (Portugal) Pedro Neto | (England) Fulham | 2–1 | 2–1 | Craven Cottage | Premier League | |
| 2026 | (Brazil) João Pedro | (England) Nottingham Forest | 1–3 | 1–3 | Stamford Bridge | Premier League | |

== See also ==
- List of Chelsea F.C. players
- List of Chelsea F.C. players (25–99 appearances)
- List of Chelsea F.C. players (1–24 appearances)
