= Robert Warren =

Robert or Bob Warren may refer to:

== Arts and entertainment ==
- Robert Penn Warren (1905–1989), American poet, novelist, and literary critic
- Robert Warren (artist) (born 1949), American artist and art instructor
- Robert Warren (musician), Australian bass guitar player
- Baby Boy Warren (Robert Henry Warren, 1919–1977), American blues singer and guitarist

== Business and industry ==
- Sir Robert Warren, 1st Baronet (1723–1811), Anglo-Irish landowner and businessman
- Robert B. Warren (died 1950), American economist
- Robert J. Warren (1933–2022), American businessman, president emeritus of LECO Corporation

== Law and politics ==
- Robert Warren (Irish politician) (1817–1897), Irish politician
- Robert W. Warren (1925–1998), American politician and judge in Wisconsin
- Robert D. Warren Sr. (1928–2013), American politician and educator

== Sports ==
- Robert Warren (rugby union), Irish international rugby union player
- Bob Warren (footballer, born 1886) (1886–1963), English professional footballer
- Bob Warren (footballer, born 1927) (1927–2002), English professional footballer
- Bob Warren (basketball) (1946–2014), American basketball player

== Others ==
- Robert Warren (ornithologist) (1829–1915), Irish ornithologist
- Robert H. Warren (1917–2010), United States Air Force general

== See also ==
- Robert de Warren, British former ballet dancer, choreographer and artistic director
- Robert Warren Miller (born 1933), American-British entrepreneur and sailing champion
