= 1915–16 Chelsea F.C. season =

English football club season

Chelsea
1915–16 season
- Chairman: Claude Kirby
- Manager: David Calderhead
- Stadium: Stamford Bridge
- London Combination: 1st
- London Combination (sub): 1st
- Top goalscorer: League: All: Charles Buchan and Bob Thomson (38)
- Biggest win: 11–1 v Luton Town (11 March 1916)
- Biggest defeat: 2–4 v Crystal Palace (18 March 1916)
Home colours	Away colours

The 1915–16 season was Chelsea Football Club's tenth year in existence. Due to the ongoing First World War, the Football League and the FA Cup were suspended. Instead, the club participated in regional competitions. Results and statistics from these matches are not considered official. In wartime matches, the club often fielded guest players from other teams, including Charlie Buchan of Sunderland. Chelsea won both the London Combination and the subsidiary competition. The club scored 121 goals in 36 Combination matches; results during the season included a 9–0 win over Arsenal, an 8–1 win against Tottenham and an 11–1 win against Luton Town.

Chelsea striker Vivian Woodward, a member of the Football Battalion, was wounded in the thigh in early 1916, but recovered. Francis 'Frank' O'Hara, who played for Chelsea in their inaugural 1905–06 season, was killed in action on 12 July 1915.
