= Martin Moran =

Martin Moran may refer to:

- Martin Moran (actor) (born 1959), American actor and writer
- Martin Moran (climber) (1955–2019), British climber, mountain guide and author
- Martin Moran (footballer) (1879–1948), Scottish footballer
