= Robert Isaac =

Robert Isaac may refer to:

- Bobby Isaac (1932-1977), NASCAR driver
- Robert M. Isaac (1928–2008), Republican mayor
- Robert Isaac (footballer) (born 1965), former Chelsea footballer
