= John Hewie =

Scottish footballer

Personal information
- Full name: John Davison Hewie
- Date of birth: 13 December 1927
- Place of birth: Pretoria, South Africa
- Date of death: 11 May 2015 (aged 87)
- Place of death: Kirton, Lincolnshire, England
- Position: Left back

Senior career*
Years	Team	Apps	(Gls)
1946	ISCOR Pretoria		
1947–1949	Arcadia Shepherds		
1949–1966	Charlton Athletic	495	(37)
1960	→ Arcadia Shepherds (loan)		
1966–1967	Arcadia United	45	(9)
1967–1968	Bexley United		
1968–1971	Arcadia Shepherds		

International career
1953	Scotland B	1	(0)
1956	South Africa XI	1	(0)
1956–1960	Scotland	19	(2)
1958	SFA trial v SFL	1	(0)

Managerial career
- 1968: Bexley United
- 1968–1971: Arcadia
- * Club domestic league appearances and goals

John Davison Hewie (13 December 1927 – 11 May 2015) was a South African-born Scottish international footballer, who spent most of his career with Charlton Athletic.

== Playing career ==
Hewie was born in Pretoria, South Africa, to Scottish emigrant parents and lived there for the first 21 years of his life. He developed a keen interest in sport while at school, notably tennis and hockey. Football however was his primary pastime and he honed his skills first with his employer's works team then local sides Arcadia and Johannesburg.

In October 1949 the opportunity arose for Hewie to turn professional with English side Charlton Athletic, who had already imported several other South African-based players. He would spend the next 19 years in south-east London, making over 500 appearances for the Addicks and playing in almost every position, including four times as an emergency goalkeeper when regular custodian Mick Rose was injured.

=== International ===
In 1956 he made his debut for the Scottish national side, playing in a 1–1 draw against England at Hampden Park. His first appearance in a Scotland shirt occurred three years earlier when he was selected for a Scotland B game in Edinburgh on the recommendation of Charlton's Scottish club doctor; it was the first occasion Hewie had set foot in Scotland. After playing well for a British-based South Africa representative side in an unofficial match in Glasgow in early 1956, he again came into consideration for the Scottish squad, and soon made the first of a total of 19 full appearances, predominantly at fullback, during which he scored twice. He was selected in the squad for the 1958 FIFA World Cup and missed a penalty in the 2–1 defeat by France.

== Baseball ==
Whilst in England, Hewie played for Briggs Brigand with fellow South African and Chelsea player Ralph Oelofse, who both represented South Eastern Counties in 1953, with Hewie also featuring for South Eastern Counties in 1956 and 1957.

== Later life ==
Hewie briefly moved into a managerial role as his playing career ended, when he undertook the role of player-manager for non-league Kent side Bexley United. He returned to South Africa and first club Arcadia in 1968 and remained in the country of his birth until the early 1990s, at which point he returned to the United Kingdom. He lived in Spalding, Lincolnshire until his death in Kirton in May 2015.

== See also ==
- List of Scotland international footballers born outside Scotland
