= Ralph Oelofse =

South African soccer player

Personal information
- Full name: Roelof Johannes Gysbertus Oelofse
- Date of birth: 12 November 1926
- Place of birth: Lichtenburg, South Africa
- Date of death: 24 October 2001 (aged 74)
- Place of death: Cape Town, South Africa
- Height: 1.80 m (5 ft 11 in)
- Position: Defender

Senior career*
Years	Team	Apps	(Gls)
- Berea Park
1951–1953	Chelsea	8	(0)
1953–1955	Watford	15	(0)

International career
1955-1956	South Africa	8	(0)
- * Club domestic league appearances and goals

Roelof Johannes Gysbertus 'Ralph' Oelofse (12 November 1926 – 24 October 2001) was a South African footballer who played in England for Chelsea and Watford.

== Baseball ==
In South Africa, Oelofse played provincial baseball for Northern Transvaal in 1949 and 1950, before moving to England. Oelofe's brother Andries also played for Northern Transvaal and went on to play for South Africa.

Whilst in England, Oelofse played for Briggs Brigand with fellow South African and Charlton left-back John Hewie, who both represented South Eastern Counties in 1953.

=== Club ===
Club	Season	League			Cup		Other		Total	
Club	Season	Division	Apps	Goals	Apps	Goals	Apps	Goals	Apps	Goals
Chelsea	1951–52	First Division	3	0	0	0	0	0	3	0
Chelsea	1952–53	First Division	5	0	0	0	0	0	5	0
Career total			8	0	0	0	0	0	8	0
