= Jimmy Windridge =

England footballer

- Windridge in 1907

Personal information
- Full name: James Edwin Windridge
- Date of birth: 21 October 1882
- Place of birth: Birmingham, England
- Date of death: 23 September 1939 (aged 56)
- Place of death: Birmingham, England
- Height: 5 ft 7 1/2 in (1.71 m)
- Position: Inside forward

Youth career
- Small Heath Alma
- 1899–1901: Small Heath

Senior career*
Years	Team	Apps	(Gls)
1901–1905	Small Heath	26	(7)
1905–1911	Chelsea	143	(54)
1911–1914	Middlesbrough	68	(11)
1914–1916	Birmingham	29	(11)

International career
1908–1909	England	8	(7)
- * Club domestic league appearances and goals

James Edwin Windridge (21 October 1882 – 23 September 1939) was an English footballer who played as an inside forward. He made more than 250 appearances in the Football League for Small Heath/Birmingham, Chelsea and Middlesbrough, and played eight times for England.

== Football career ==
Born in Small Heath, Birmingham, Windridge began his senior football career with his local club, Small Heath (now known as Birmingham City), making his debut in 1903. In his first season the club were promoted to the First Division. He became one of the first players to join the newly formed Chelsea Football Club in 1905, arriving for the sum of £190 and with fellow Small Heath players, Jimmy Robertson and Bob McRoberts. His impact was immediate, scoring a hat-trick for the club on his home debut against Hull City in the first competitive football match ever played at Stamford Bridge.

Windridge scored 16 goals that season as Chelsea finished a respectable third in the Second Division, and hit 18 in the next, helping the club earn promotion to the First Division. Thereafter he was overshadowed by more high-profile forwards at the club, such as George Hilsdon and Vivian Woodward, and moved on to Middlesbrough in 1911. Returning to Birmingham in 1914, he equalled a club record by scoring five goals in a league match against Glossop in 1915.

He was also an England international, making his debut in 1908 against Ireland. He scored in six consecutive matches for his country, equalling a record set by Tinsley Lindley and never subsequently surpassed. The sequence included all four matches during England's first overseas tour, and Windridge ended his international career with an impressive seven goals from eight games.

== Outside football ==
Windridge also played cricket for Warwickshire, appearing in seven first-class matches from 1909 to 1913. He was the cousin of fellow England international Alex Leake.

He died in Small Heath at the age of 56.
