= Errol McNally =

Northern Irish footballer

Personal information
- Full name: Errol Alexander McNally
- Date of birth: 27 August 1943
- Place of birth: Lurgan, Northern Ireland
- Date of death: 15 May 2017 (aged 73)
- Position: Goalkeeper

Youth career
- Portadown

Senior career*
Years	Team	Apps	(Gls)
1958–1961	Portadown		
1961–1963	Chelsea	9	(0)
- Glenavon
Total		9+	(0+)
- * Club domestic league appearances and goals

Errol Alexander McNally (27 August 1943 – 15 May 2017) was a Northern Irish professional footballer who played as a goalkeeper.

== Club career ==
McNally moved to England to sign for Chelsea in December 1961 after impressing with his performances for Portadown. He made nine appearances before returning to Northern Ireland to sign for Glenavon.

== Death ==
McNally died on 15 May 2017 and was buried in Magheradroll Parish Church, Ballynahinch.
