= Bob Salmond =

Scottish footballer (1911–1998)

Personal information
- Full name: Robert Craig Salmond
- Date of birth: 22 September 1911
- Place of birth: Kilmarnock, Scotland
- Date of death: October 1998 (aged 87)
- Height: 1.83 m (6 ft 0 in)
- Position: Defender

Youth career
- Dundee North End

Senior career*
Years	Team	Apps	(Gls)
- Dundee North End
1931–1938	Portsmouth	135	(0)
1938–1945	Chelsea	24	(0)
- Banbury Spencer
- * Club domestic league appearances and goals

Robert Craig Salmond (22 September 1911 – October 1998) was a Scottish professional footballer who played as a defender.

== Club career ==
Salmond played for Portsmouth between 1931 and 1938, amassing 135 appearances. He joined Chelsea in 1938, and would go on to play 24 games in a career interrupted by the Second World War.
