= Paul Williams (footballer, born 1962) =

English footballer

Personal information
- Full name: Paul John Williams
- Date of birth: 16 November 1962 (age 63)
- Place of birth: Lambeth, England
- Position: Central defender

Senior career*
Years	Team	Apps	(Gls)
1982–1983	Chelsea	1	(0)
1982	→ Kuopion Elo (loan)	12	(3)
- Woking
- Leatherhead
- * Club domestic league appearances and goals

Paul John Williams (born 16 November 1962) is an English former professional footballer who played in the Football League as a defender.

== Sources ==
- Paul Williams, Neil Brown
