= Owen Marshall (footballer) =

English footballer

Owen Thomas Marshall (17 September 1892 – 18 May 1963) was an English professional footballer of the 1920s. Born in Nottingham, he joined Gillingham from Chelsea in 1921 and went on to make 39 appearances for the club in The Football League. He left to join Maidstone United in 1923.
