= William Watson (footballer, fl. 1903–1909) =

English footballer

Personal information
- Full name: William Watson
- Date of birth: Not known
- Date of death: Not known
- Position: Forward

Senior career*
| Years | Team | Apps | (Gls) |
| – | South Bank | | |
| 1903–1907 | Lincoln City | 120 | (28) |
| – | Newark | | |
| 1908–1909 | Lincoln City | | |
| – | Castleford Town | | |
- * Club domestic league appearances and goals

William Watson was a professional footballer who scored 28 goals from 120 appearances in the Football League playing as a forward for Lincoln City.

== Football career ==
Watson played for South Bank before moving into the Football League with Lincoln City. He made his debut on 5 September 1903 in a 2–1 win at home to Grimsby Town in the Second Division. He remained with the club until the 1906–07 season, in which he was the club's leading scorer with 11 goals from League and FA Cup games. He then dropped out of the League to play for Newark in the Midland League, before returning to Lincoln, newly relegated to the Midland League for the 1908–09 season, during which he scored 16 goals from 40 games in League and FA Cup. He finished his career at yet another Midland League club, Castleford Town.
