= Tommy Miller (footballer, born 1882) =

Scottish footballer (1882–1932)

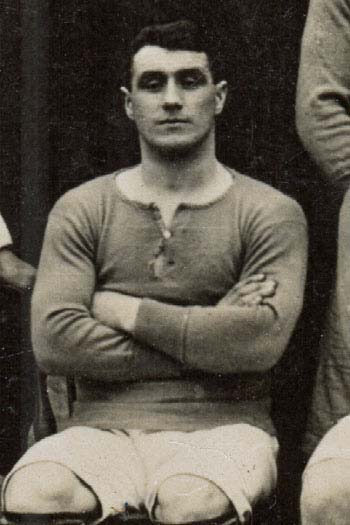

Personal information
- Full name: Thomas Miller
- Date of birth: 29 April 1882
- Place of birth: Edinburgh, Scotland
- Date of death: 1932
- Position: Left back

Senior career*
Years	Team	Apps	(Gls)
–	Edinburgh Myrtle		
1902–1905	Falkirk	65	(11)
1905–1909	Chelsea	112	(0)
1909–1912	Falkirk	22	(0)
1910–1911	→ Dundee Hibernian (loan)	15	(1)
1919–1920	St Bernard's		
1920–1921	Bathgate		
Total		214	(12)

International career
1910	Scottish League XI	1	(0)
- * Club domestic league appearances and goals

Thomas Currie Miller (29 April 1882 – 1932) was a Scottish footballer who played for Falkirk, Chelsea and Dundee Hibernian, mainly as a left back.

He was part of the Falkirk team which finished runners-up in the 1909–10 Scottish Division One, having returned to Scotland after being released by Chelsea, where he was recruited as one of the initial batch of players after the club was formed, and remained in West London for four seasons. He took part in the first Scottish Football League fixtures played by both Falkirk in 1902 and Dundee Hibernian (later Dundee United) in 1910, and the first English Football League match played by Chelsea in 1905. After World War I, aged in his late 30s, he made a comeback of sorts with St Bernard's and Bathgate.

Miller was selected once for the Scottish Football League XI in 1910.
