= Walter Bennett (footballer, born 1901) =

English footballer (1901–1988)

Personal information
- Full name: Walter Bennett
- Date of birth: 17 April 1901
- Place of birth: Sheffield, England
- Date of death: 1988 (aged 86–87)
- Position: Wing-half

Senior career*
Years	Team	Apps	(Gls)
1921–1922	Tinsley WMC		
1922–1924	Chelsea	5	(0)
1924–1925	Southend United	6	(0)
1925–1926	Doncaster Rovers	0	(0)
1926–1927	Portsmouth	0	(0)
1927–1928	Gainsborough Trinity		
1928–1930	Bristol City	20	(0)
1930	Ballymena		
Total		31	(0)
- * Club domestic league appearances and goals

Walter Bennett (17 April 1901 – 1988) was an English footballer who played in the Football League for Bristol City, Chelsea and Southend United.
