= Bob Warren (footballer, born 1886) =

English footballer

Personal information
- Full name: Robert Adolphus Warren
- Date of birth: 1886
- Place of birth: Newhall, Derbyshire, England
- Date of death: 1963 (aged 76–77)
- Position: Forward

Senior career*
Years	Team	Apps	(Gls)
1906–1907	Derby County	0	(0)
1907–1909	Burton United		
1909–1910	Grimsby Town	1	(0)
1910–1911	Shrewsbury Town		
1911–191?	Newhall Swifts		
- * Club domestic league appearances and goals

Robert Adolphus Warren (1886–1963) was an English professional footballer who played as a forward.
