= Charlie Dyke =

Welsh footballer

Personal information
- Date of birth: 23 September 1926
- Place of birth: Llanbradach, Wales
- Date of death: 4 January 2013 (aged 86)
- Place of death: Penarth, Vale of Glamorgan, Wales
- Position: Midfielder

Senior career*
Years	Team	Apps	(Gls)
- Troedyrhiw
1947–1951	Chelsea	24	(2)
1951–1956	Barry Town United		
- Haverfordwest County
- Worcester City
- Barry Town United
- * Club domestic league appearances and goals

Charles H. Dyke (23 September 1926 – 4 January 2013) was a Welsh professional footballer who played as a midfielder.

== Club career ==
After over five hundred appearances for Barry Town United, Dyke was inducted into the Barry Town Hall of Fame in 2012.

== Death ==
He died on 4 January 2013.
