= Miles Spector =

English footballer (1934–2023)

Personal information
- Full name: Miles David Spector
- Date of birth: 4 August 1934
- Place of birth: Hendon, England
- Date of death: 19 October 2023 (aged 89)
- Position: Centre forward

Senior career*
Years	Team	Apps	(Gls)
1952–1954	Chelsea	3	(0)
1954–1956	Hendon		
1956	Millwall	1	(0)
- * Club domestic league appearances and goals

Miles David Spector (4 August 1934 – 19 October 2023) was an English professional footballer who played for Chelsea, Hendon and Millwall as a centre forward. Spector died on 19 October 2023 at the age of 89.
