= 1915–16 in English football =

Football in England
- Season: 1915–16

The 1915–16 season was the first season of special wartime football in England during the First World War.

== Overview ==
Between 1915 and 1919 competitive football was suspended in England. Many footballers signed up to fight in the war and as a result many teams were depleted, and fielded guest players instead. The Football League and FA Cup were suspended and in their place regional league competitions were set up; appearances in these tournaments do not count in players' official records.

== Honours ==
There were four regional leagues. Each league was split into a principal tournament and a subsidiary tournament, except the South-West Combination. The Lancashire and Midland Sections were split into further regional divisions, while the London Combination remained a single league.

Competition	Principal Tournament winner	Subsidiary Tournament winner(s)
Football League (Lancashire Section)	Manchester City	Burnley (Northern Division); Manchester City (Southern Division)
Football League (Midland Section)	Nottingham Forest	Leeds City (Northern Division); Nottingham Forest (Southern Division); Grimsby Town (Midland Division)
London Combination	Chelsea	Chelsea
South-West Combination	Portsmouth	n/a

== See also ==
- England national football team results (unofficial matches)
