= Bob Warren (footballer, born 1927) =

English footballer (1927–2002)

Personal information
- Full name: Robert Edward Warren
- Date of birth: 8 January 1927
- Place of birth: Devonport, England
- Date of death: November 2002 (aged 75)
- Place of death: Plymouth, England
- Position: Defender

Senior career*
Years	Team	Apps	(Gls)
	Plymouth United	?	(?)
1946–1948	Plymouth Argyle	3	(0)
1948–1951	Chelsea	1	(0)
1951–1952	Torquay United	5	(1)
Total		9	(1)
- * Club domestic league appearances and goals

Robert Edward Warren (8 January 1927 – November 2002) was an English professional footballer who played in the Football League as a defender.
