= James Watson (footballer, born 1879) =

Scottish footballer

James "Dougal" Watson
Personal information
- Full name: James Watson
- Date of birth: 29 October 1879
- Place of birth: Inverness, Inverness-shire, Scotland
- Date of death: 9 June 1911 (aged 31)
- Place of death: Inverness, Inverness-shire, Scotland
- Positions: Left back; forward

Senior career*
Years	Team	Apps	(Gls)
-1903	Inverness Thistle		
1903–1904	Sunderland	5	(0)
1905	Portsmouth		
1906	Chelsea	13	(0)
Total		18	(0)
- * Club domestic league appearances and goals

James "Dougal" Watson (born 29 October 1879 in Inverness, Scotland; died of Pleurisy, 9 June 1911 at the Northern Infirmary in Inverness, Scotland) was a Scottish footballer who played for Inverness Thistle, Sunderland and Chelsea.
According to a notice in the Dundee Evening Post of 19 May 1903, Watson was signed to Sunderland on the 18th, following a season as Team Captain at Inverness Thistle. He made his Sunderland debut against Wolverhampton Wanderers on 24 October 1903 in a 2–1 defeat at The Molineux Stadium. He was at Sunderland during 1903 to 1904 and played in just five games, scoring no goals.
On the 8th of May 1905, Tom Tiddler announced in the Athletic News that Watson was one at least four Sunderland players going South for the next season, with a move to the 'new' Chelsea club. He made his Chelsea debut against Blackpool on 9 September 1905 in a 0-1 win. He was at Chelsea during 1905 to 1906 and - according to the History of Chelsea F.C. website http://www.stamford-bridge.com - played in 13 competitive first team games, scoring no goals.
By the time of his death, in June 1911, he had returned to Inverness, and was employed as a Journeyman Plumber.
