= Peter Proudfoot =

Scottish footballer and manager

Personal information
- Date of birth: 28 October 1879
- Place of birth: Innerleithen, Scotland
- Date of death: 4 March 1941 (aged 61)
- Place of death: Wishaw, Scotland
- Position: Half back

Senior career*
Years	Team	Apps	(Gls)
–	Wishaw		
–	Wishaw United		
1900–1903	Lincoln City	79	(20)
1903	St Mirren	2	(0)
1904	Albion Rovers	2	(0)
1904–1905	Millwall		
1905–1906	Clapton Orient	26	(0)
1906–1907	Chelsea	12	(0)
1907–1908	Manchester United	0	(0)
1908–1913	Stockport County	45	(1)
1910	→ Morton (loan)	1	(0)

Managerial career
- 1922–1929: Clapton Orient
- 1930–1931: Clapton Orient
- 1935–1939: Clapton Orient
- * Club domestic league appearances and goals

Peter Proudfoot (28 October 1879 – 4 March 1941) was a Scottish footballer who scored 21 goals in 162 appearances in the Football League playing for Lincoln City, Clapton Orient, Chelsea and Stockport County. He played at inside right, centre half or right half. He also played in the Southern League for Millwall and briefly for Scottish Football League clubs St Mirren, Albion Rovers and Morton. When he signed for Millwall in 1904, the Daily Express described him as "a big strapping fellow with a fine knowledge of the game". He was the first player to be transferred directly from Chelsea to Manchester United.

Proudfoot was manager of Clapton Orient in three spells covering much of the 1920s and 1930s. In 1928, the Football Association suspended him from football for six months for financial irregularities.

== Personal life ==
Proudfoot served in the Lanarkshire Yeomanry and Royal Scots Fusiliers and as a lieutenant in the Labour Corps during the First World War. He was mentioned in despatches on 16 January 1918.
