= Walter Toomer =

English footballer

Personal information
- Full name: Walter Edward Toomer
- Date of birth: 9 February 1883
- Place of birth: Southampton, England
- Date of death: 28 December 1962 (aged 79)
- Place of death: Southampton, England
- Positions: Right-half; outside right

Senior career*
Years	Team	Apps	(Gls)
	Fulham	0	(0)
1905–1906	Chelsea	0	(0)
1906–1914	Southampton	10	(0)
- * Club domestic league appearances and goals

Walter Edward Toomer (9 February 1883 – 28 December 1962) was an English amateur footballer who played at either right-half or at outside-right for Southampton in the Southern League in the period prior to World War I. By profession he was a schoolteacher before running the family sports outfitters business in Southampton, and later becoming a director of Southampton Football Club.

== Early life and education ==
Toomer was born in Southampton, the son of a cricket bat maker and was educated at St John's College, Battersea. He remained in London where he studied to become a teacher, and was on the books of Fulham and Chelsea without making any first-team appearances for Fulham and only playing in one FA Cup tie for Chelsea.

== Football career ==
In 1906, he took up a teaching appointment in his home town where he also helped his father run the family sports outfitters business based in London Road. At the same time, he was signed by Southampton Football Club as an amateur player and spent most of his time with the club in the reserves, becoming the reserve-team captain.

His first-team debut came on 5 January 1907, when he played at outside-right in a 1–1 draw at Norwich City, with Bert Hoskins moving to inside-right in the absence of Frank Jefferis. Although he "performed competently" whenever he was called into the first team, his appearances over the next eight years were rather spasmodic, with two in 1906–07, one in 1908–09, two in 1909–10, three in 1910–11 and two in 1912–13, a total of ten appearances of which three came as a forward and seven as a half-back.

Toomer remained with the "Saints" until 1914, when he enlisted in the Royal Artillery.

== Later career ==
During the First World War, he served with the Royal Artillery in France. After the war, he returned to Southampton to take over his father's business and abandoned his teaching and football careers. The sportswear business continued to operate from premises at the corner of London Road and Waterloo Terrace until the 1990s and the family company was dissolved in April 1996. An advertising slogan for the business was still visible on their former premises until 2011, but has now been overpainted.

In May 1950, Toomer was appointed a director of Southampton Football Club, continuing as such until his death.
