= Michael Byrne (footballer, born 1880) =

English footballer

Personal information
- Full name: Michael Patrick Byrne
- Date of birth: 20 March 1880
- Place of birth: Bristol, England
- Date of death: 1931 (aged 50–51)
- Height: 5 ft 10 in (1.78 m)
- Position: Goalkeeper

Senior career*
Years	Team	Apps	(Gls)
1902–1903	Bristol Rovers		
1903–1905	Southampton	5	(0)
1905–1907	Chelsea	4	(0)
1907–1908	Glossop	11	(0)
- * Club domestic league appearances and goals

Michael Patrick Byrne (20 March 1880 – 1931) was an English footballer who played as a goalkeeper for various clubs in the 1900s.

== Football career ==
Byrne was born in Bristol and after serving in the Grenadier Guards and the Gloucestershire Regiment, joined Bristol Rovers of the Southern League in 1902. The following season, he moved to join the Southern League champions, Southampton as cover for George Clawley. He made his debut in a 2–0 victory over Swindon Town on 23 January 1904, and followed this with a clean sheet in the next match before Clawley's return. He made three further appearances (all victories, with two further clean sheets) before a move to Chelsea in August 1905, for their inaugural season in the Football League.

At Chelsea, he was at first the understudy to William "Fatty" Foulke, making four appearances in the 1905–06 season. Following Foulke's departure at the end of the season, Bob Whiting was promoted to the first-choice 'keeper, helping Chelsea gain promotion to the First Division at the end of the season, in which Byrne made a single appearance.

Byrne then moved on to join Glossop, where he made 11 Second Division appearances before retiring in 1908.

== Later career ==
Byrne later returned to Bristol to settle and took up employment with the Imperial Tobacco Company. He served as a private in the Royal Defence Corps during the First World War.
