= Willie Porter (English footballer) =

English footballer

Personal information
- Full name: William Alfred Porter
- Date of birth: 1884
- Place of birth: London, England
- Position: Forward

Senior career*
| Years | Team | Apps | (Gls) |
- London Caledonians
| 1902–1904 | Fulham | | |
| 1904–1905 | London Caledonians | | |
| 1905–1907 | Chelsea | 3 | (0) |
- Luton Town
- London Caledonians
- Ilford
- * Club domestic league appearances and goals

William Alfred Porter (born 1884) was an English footballer who played in the Football League for Chelsea.
