= Jimmy Robertson (footballer, born 1880) =

Scottish footballer

Personal information
- Full name: James Robertson
- Date of birth: 1880
- Place of birth: Glasgow, Scotland
- Position: Inside right

Youth career
- Glasgow United

Senior career*
Years	Team	Apps	(Gls)
1901–1903	Crewe Alexandra		
1903–1905	Small Heath	6	(2)
1905–1907	Chelsea	29	(21)
1907–1909	Glossop	70	(28)
–	Leyton		
–	Partick Thistle		
–	Ayr United		
1912	Barrow		
1912–1913	Leeds City	27	(7)
1913–1915	Gateshead Town		
- * Club domestic league appearances and goals

James Robertson (1880 – after 1915) was a Scottish professional footballer who played as an inside right.

Born in Glasgow, Robertson moved to England to join Crewe Alexandra, who were then playing in the Birmingham & District League, where he made his name as a goal-poacher. He signed for Small Heath, newly promoted to the Football League First Division, in 1903 for a fee of £25, but failed to adapt to League football. Two years later, along with fellow Small Heath players Jimmy Windridge and Bob McRoberts, he moved to Chelsea, where he scored 22 goals in the club's first couple of seasons in the English Football League, as well as one in the FA Cup. Spells followed with Leyton, Partick Thistle, Ayr United, Barrow, Leeds City and Gateshead Town, before he retired in 1915.
