= George Henderson (footballer, born 1880) =

Scottish footballer

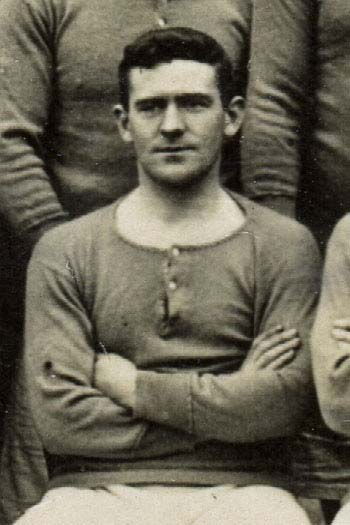

Personal information
- Full name: George Hunter Henderson
- Date of birth: 2 May 1880
- Place of birth: Ladhope, Scotland
- Date of death: 27 January 1930 (aged 49)
- Place of death: Selkirk, Scotland
- Position: Right half

Senior career*
Years	Team	Apps	(Gls)
1900–1902	Queen's Park	0	(0)
1902	Dundee	15	(0)
1902–1905	Rangers	34	(0)
1905–1906	Middlesbrough		
1906–1909	Chelsea	62	(1)
1909–1910	Glossop		

International career
1904	Scotland	1	(0)
- * Club domestic league appearances and goals

George Hunter Henderson (2 May 1880 – 27 January 1930) was a Scottish footballer who played as a right half for Rangers, Middlesbrough, Chelsea among others. He won the Scottish Cup with Rangers in 1903.

Henderson played once for Scotland, against Ireland on 26 March 1904.
