= Bob Mackie (footballer) =

Scottish footballer (1879–1943)

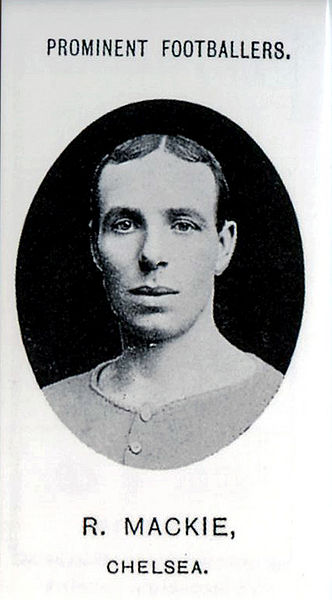

Personal information
- Full name: Robert Mackie
- Date of birth: 25 August 1879
- Place of birth: Dalry, Ayrshire, Scotland
- Date of death: 13 August 1961 (aged 81)
- Place of death: Airdrie, Lanarkshire, Scotland
- Height: 5 ft 10 in (1.78 m)
- Position: Full back

Senior career*
Years	Team	Apps	(Gls)
- Bannockburn
- Cowie Wanderers
1903–1905	Heart of Midlothian	17	(1)
1903–1904	→ Stenhousemuir (loan)		
1905–1907	Chelsea	44	(1)
1907–1909	Leicester Fosse	33	(0)
- Darlington
1910–1916	Airdrieonians	191	(2)
1916–1918	Third Lanark	47	(0)
- * Club domestic league appearances and goals

Robert Mackie (25 August 1879 – 13 August 1961) was a Scottish professional footballer who played in the Scottish League for Airdrieonians, Third Lanark and Heart of Midlothian as a full back. He also played in the Football League for Chelsea and Leicester Fosse.

== Career ==
Hearts

Mackie began his career in the lower reaches of Scottish football with Bannockburn and Cowie Wanderers before drawing the attention of top-division side Heart of Midlothian in 1903. He was shortly after loaned out to junior side Stenhousemuir, where he spent the 1903-04 campaign.

The following season he forced his way into Hearts' first team and was a regular starter throughout the side's 1904-05 Scottish Division One campaign, which it finished in 7th place.

Chelsea

Mackie joined the newly-formed Chelsea on 23 May 1905 from Hearts after a two-year spell with the Edinburgh club.

Mackie was an ever-present in his first season with Chelsea, playing more games than any other squad member as the team narrowly missed out on promotion to the First Division after a dramatic late-season collapse.

Most notably however, the Scottish full-back filled in as goalkeeper for Chelsea's FA Cup second qualifying round win over Southern United, in which he impressively registered a clean sheet.

Described as being one the "fastest men in Scotland" prior to joining Chelsea - Mackie appears to have suffered bad luck with injuries during his time in London.

In his second season with Chelsea he lost his starting berth and would only play 5 matches (3 in the league) as the club won promotion to the First Division.

The following year, Mackie regained his first team role in the early weeks of the season, but left for Second Division Leicester Fosse in November 1907. He played 6 league matches as Chelsea went on to register a creditable 13th-place finish in their first-ever top flight campaign.

Leicester Fosse

For the second season in succession, Mackie would enjoy promotion from the English second tier, playing 18 matches as Leicester finished in 2nd place.

On his return to top flight football, Mackie would suffer a disastrous season as Leicester finished rock bottom of the league and promptly returned to the Second Division. He played 18 matches overall across league and cup.

Airdrie and later career

After a short spell at Darlington in the North Eastern League, Mackie returned to the Scottish top tier to join Airdrie.

In his six seasons with the club, all in the Scottish Division One, Mackie was one of the first names on the team sheet - turning out for the Lanarkshire side over 200 times in league and cup.

Despite not winning any senior trophies with Airdrie, he did help guide them to a 3rd place finish in 1913, and a 6th place finish the following season.

He would enjoy a further two seasons of top flight football with Third Lanark, finishing 5th in 1917.

Mackie died aged 81 in Airdrie, Lanarkshire, in 1961. He was cremated at the Daldowie Crematorium near Glasgow.

== Honours ==
Heart of Midlothian

- Rosebery Charity Cup: 1903–04

Airdrie

- Lanarkshire Cup: 1910–11, 1912–13, 1913–14, 1914–15

== Career statistics ==
Appearances and goals by club, season and competition
Club	Season	League			National Cup		Other		Total	
Club	Season	Division	Apps	Goals	Apps	Goals	Apps	Goals	Apps	Goals
Heart of Midlothian	1903–04	Scottish Division One	0	0	0	0	2 (Note: Appearances in Rosebery Charity Cup)	0	2	0
Heart of Midlothian	1904–05	Scottish Division One	17	1	2	0	3 (Note: 2 appearances in East Of Scotland Shield, 1 appearance in East of Scotland Cup)	0	22	1
Heart of Midlothian	Total		17	1	2	0	5	0	24	1
Chelsea	1905–06	Second Division	35	1	2	0	—		37	1
Chelsea	1906–07	Second Division	3	0	2	0	—		5	0
Chelsea	1907–08	First Division	6	0	0	0	—		6	0
Chelsea	Total		44	1	3	0	—		47	1
Leicester Fosse	1907–08	Second Division	18	0	0	0	—		18	0
Leicester Fosse	1908–09	First Division	15	0	3	0	—		18	0
Leicester Fosse	Total		33	0	3	0	—		36	0
Airdrieonians	1910–11	Scottish Division One	22	0	2	0	—		24	0
Airdrieonians	1911–12	Scottish Division One	32	2	3	0	—		35	2
Airdrieonians	1912–13	Scottish Division One	34	0	2	0	—		36	0
Airdrieonians	1913–14	Scottish Division One	31	0	3	0	—		34	0
Airdrieonians	1914–15	Scottish Division One	34	0	—		—		34	0
Airdrieonians	1915–16	Scottish Division One	38	0	—		—		38	0
Airdrieonians	Total		191	2	10	0	—		201	2
Third Lanark	1916–17	Scottish Division One	32	0	—		—		32	0
Third Lanark	1917–18	Scottish Division One	15	0	—		—		15	0
Third Lanark	Total		47	0	—		—		47	0
Career total			332	4	18	0	5	0	355	4
