= Martin Moran (footballer) =

Scottish footballer

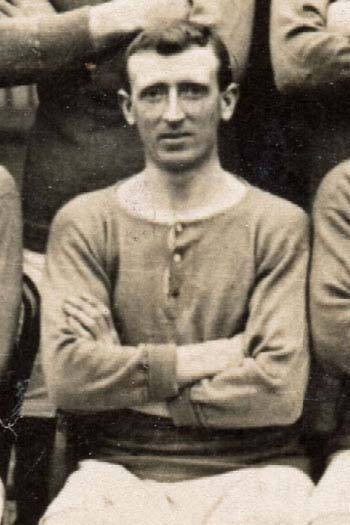

Personal information
- Full name: Martin Moran McInally
- Date of birth: 8 December 1873
- Place of birth: Blantyre, Scotland
- Date of death: 26 January 1967 (aged 93)
- Place of death: Montreal, Canada
- Height: 5 ft 5 in (1.65 m)
- Position: Outside right

Senior career*
| Years | Team | Apps | (Gls) |
| – | Benburb | | |
| 1898 | Celtic | 1 | (0) |
| 1898–1899 | Clyde | 10 | (1) |
| 1899–1900 | Sheffield United | 7 | (0) |
| 1900–1902 | Middlesbrough | 36 | (5) |
| 1902–1904 | Millwall Athletic | 86 | (13) |
| 1904–1905 | Heart of Midlothian | 24 | (1) |
| 1905–1908 | Chelsea | 63 | (6) |
| 1908–1909 | Celtic | 2 | (0) |
| 1909–1910 | Hamilton Academical | 20 | (1) |
| 1910–1911 | Albion Rovers | 3 | (0) |
| Total | | 252 | (27) |
- * Club domestic league appearances and goals

Martin Moran (8 December 1873 – 26 January 1967) was a Scottish footballer who played mainly as an outside right. His many clubs included Celtic (two spells), Clyde, Heart of Midlothian, Hamilton Academical and Albion Rovers in Scotland, and Sheffield United, Middlesbrough, Millwall Athletic and Chelsea in England. Small and slight in stature, he was known as "Mighty Midget".

His first spell at Celtic in 1898, included appearances in a two-legged friendly billed as the informal 'Championship for Great Britain' against Sheffield United (although the first match took place before either club was officially champion of their nation), prior to being moved on in October of that year along with several other fringe players in a cost-cutting measure.

After a good season with Clyde he moved to England with Sheffield United, where he was a back-up squad member as the Blades were runners-up in the 1899–1900 Football League, then played a minor role in Middlesbrough's promotion from the second tier in 1901–02. From 1902 to 1904 he appeared in 99 competitive matches (17 goals) for Millwall Athletic, reached the FA Cup semi-final in 1902–03 and won the London League and the Southern Professional Charity Cup in 1903–04. In his season with Hearts back in Scotland he won the minor Rosebery Charity Cup, and was involved in another English promotion with Chelsea in 1906–07, having been in their first-ever team the previous year. On returning to Celtic in 1908, a decade after his previous time in Glasgow (this time in the role of an experienced reserve), he was a Glasgow Merchants Charity Cup winner.

Moran played in the Home Scots v Anglo-Scots international trial match of 1905 while contracted to Hearts, but received no further representative honours.
