= Robert Isaac (footballer) =

English footballer

Personal information
- Full name: Robert Charles Isaac
- Date of birth: 30 November 1965 (age 60)
- Place of birth: Hackney, England
- Height: 5 ft 11 in (1.80 m)
- Position: Defender

Youth career
- 1982–1985: Chelsea

Senior career*
Years	Team	Apps	(Gls)
1985–1987	Chelsea	9	(0)
1987–1990	Brighton & Hove Albion	30	(0)
Total		39	(0)

International career
1985	England U19	4	(0)
- * Club domestic league appearances and goals

Robert Isaac (born 30 November 1965) is an English former footballer who played professionally for Chelsea and Brighton & Hove Albion as a defender.

== Career ==
Isaac joined Chelsea in 1982, and was named Young Player of the Year in 1984. He made his debut in a 3–1 win over Watford in 1985, a year after being stabbed by Millwall fans. He spent two years in the Chelsea first team, making thirteen appearances in all competitions for The Blues. He left for Brighton & Hove Albion in 1987, where he made 30 appearances before retiring in 1990. Since retiring, he has worked as a chauffeur for the Maktoums, the ruling family of Dubai.

== Stabbing at Millwall ==
Isaac and five friends were attending a League Cup game between Millwall and Chelsea at The Den on 9 October 1984, when they realised they were heading towards the home end. To avoid any incidents, they decided to cut through an alleyway, where they were confronted by a group of Millwall fans. According to Isaac, he and his friends were asked to name the Millwall reserve team goalkeeper, which they could not do, due to fear. He was then 'slashed across his back from his armpit to the base of his spine', before charging through the group and fleeing. He was found bleeding by council worker George Bennetts, before being rushed to the Lewisham Hospital, where he required 55 stitches. He reportedly only survived due to the thickness of the leather jacket he was wearing at the time.
