= 1927–28 Chelsea F.C. season =

English football club season

Chelsea
1927–28 season
- Chairman: Claude Kirby
- Manager: David Calderhead
- Stadium: Stamford Bridge
- Second Division: 3rd
- FA Cup: Third round
- Top goalscorer: League: Jimmy Thompson (25); All: Jimmy Thompson (25)
- Highest home attendance: 53,309 vs Oldham Athletic (6 April 1928)
- Lowest home attendance: 13,707 vs Barnsley (5 May 1928)
- Average home league attendance: 33,917
- Biggest win: 6–0 v South Shields (3 December 1927)
- Biggest defeat: 0–5 v Leeds United (10 December 1927)
Home colours	Away colours

The 1927–28 season was Chelsea Football Club's nineteenth competitive season and fourth consecutive season in the Second Division. The club finished 3rd in the league, narrowly missing out on promotion to the First Division.

== Players ==
Note: Flags indicate national team as defined under FIFA eligibility rules; some limited exceptions apply. Players may hold more than one non-FIFA nationality.

Pos.	Nation	Player
GK	ENG	Sam Millington
GK	ENG	Peter McKenna
DF	ENG	Leslie Odell
DF	ENG	Harold Miller
DF	SCO	George Rodgers
DF	ENG	Harry Wilding
DF	ENG	John Townrow
DF	SCO	Tommy Law
DF	SCO	George Smith
MF	IRL	Sam Irving
MF	SCO	John Priestley

Pos.	Nation	Player
FW	SCO	Bob Turnbull
FW	ENG	George Biswell
FW	SCO	George Anderson
FW	ENG	William Jackson
FW	ENG	James Thompson
FW	ENG	Albert Thain
FW	ENG	George Pearson
FW	SCO	Andrew Wilson
FW	ENG	Jackie Crawford
FW	SCO	Willie Ferguson

== Competitions ==
=== Overall record ===
Competition	First match	Last match	Starting round	Final position	Record							
Competition	First match	Last match	Starting round	Final position	Pld	W	D	L	GF	GA	GD	Win %
Second Division	27 August 1927	5 May 1928	Matchday 1	3rd	42	23	8	11	75	45	+30	54.76
FA Cup	14 January 1928		Third round	Third round	1	0	0	1	1	2	−1	0.00
Total					43	23	8	12	76	47	+29	53.49

Source: Stamford-bridge.com

=== Second Division ===
==== League table ====
Pos	Team	Pld	W	D	L	GF	GA	GAv	Pts	Promotion or relegation
1	Manchester City (C, P)	42	25	9	8	100	59	1.695	59	Promotion to the First Division
2	Leeds United (P)	42	25	7	10	98	49	2.000	57	Promotion to the First Division
3	Chelsea	42	23	8	11	75	45	1.667	54	
4	Preston North End	42	22	9	11	100	66	1.515	53	
5	Stoke City	42	22	8	12	78	59	1.322	52	

(C) Champions; (P) Promoted

==== Results summary ====
Overall								Home						Away					
Pld	W	D	L	GF	GA	GAv	Pts	W	D	L	GF	GA	Pts	W	D	L	GF	GA	Pts
42	23	8	11	75	45	1.667	54	15	2	4	46	15	32	8	6	7	29	30	22

Source: Stamford-bridge.com

==== Matches ====
Win Draw Loss Fixtures

27 August 1927 1	Reading	1–2	Chelsea	Reading
15:15 GMT	Davey 38'	Report	Thompson 22'; Crawford 27'	Stadium: Elm Park; Attendance: 24,529; Referee: Archie Caseley

3 September 1927 2	Chelsea	3–0	Blackpool	Fulham
15:30 GMT	Wilding 14'; Thompson 72', 88'	Report		Stadium: Stamford Bridge; Attendance: 36,529; Referee: Harry Kingscott

7 September 1927 3	Chelsea	5–0	Notts County	Fulham
18:00 GMT	Thompson (x2); Wilson 26'; Thain 58'; Wilding 63'	Report		Stadium: Stamford Bridge; Attendance: 18,416; Referee: George Nunnerley

10 September 1927 4	Fulham	1–1	Chelsea	Fulham
15:30 GMT	McKenna 81'	Report	Thain 13'	Stadium: Craven Cottage; Attendance: 39,860; Referee: F.W. Reeve

17 September 1927 5	Clapton Orient	2–1	Chelsea	Clapton
15:30 GMT	Whipp 30'; Kerr 85'	Report	Wilson 90'	Stadium: Millfields Road; Attendance: 34,838; Referee: Archie Caseley

24 September 1927 6	Chelsea	1–1	West Bromwich Albion	Fulham
15:30 GMT	Thompson 70'	Report	Carter 40'	Stadium: Stamford Bridge; Attendance: 44,724; Referee: William Russell

1 October 1927 7	Bristol City	1–1	Chelsea	Ashton Gate
15:15 GMT	Blakemore 40'	Report	Wilson 3'	Stadium: Ashton Gate Stadium; Attendance: 24,005; Referee: Thomas Greaves

6 October 1927 8	Notts County	0–1	Chelsea	Nottingham
15:15 GMT		Report	Wilson 7'	Stadium: Meadow Lane; Attendance: 9,127; Referee: George Nunnerley

8 October 1927 9	Chelsea	1–0	Stoke City	Fulham
15:30 GMT	Crawford 30' (pen.)	Report		Stadium: Stamford Bridge; Attendance: 41,472; Referee: Charles Lines

15 October 1927 10	Southampton	2–4	Chelsea	Southampton
15:15 GMT	Petrie 36', 90'	Report	Pearson (x2); Thain 60'; Thompson 75'	Stadium: The Dell; Attendance: 14,724; Referee: E.C. Sambrook

22 October 1927 11	Chelsea	2–0	Hull City	Fulham
15:00 GMT	Wilson 40'; Thompson 79'	Report		Stadium: Stamford Bridge; Attendance: 15,153; Referee: Tommy Crew

29 October 1927 12	Preston North End	0–3	Chelsea	Preston
15:00 GMT		Report	Pearson 20'; Thompson 35', 46'	Stadium: Deepdale; Attendance: 23,107; Referee: H.V. Stott

5 November 1927 13	Chelsea	4–0	Swansea Town	Fulham
14:45 GMT	Crawford 12', 17'; Thain 40'; Thompson 44'	Report		Stadium: Stamford Bridge; Attendance: 41,220; Referee: William Russell

12 November 1927 14	Manchester City	0–1	Chelsea	Moss Side
14:40 GMT		Report	Pearson 38'	Stadium: Maine Road; Attendance: 52,830; Referee: Edwin Small

19 November 1927 15	Chelsea	2–1	Nottingham Forest	Fulham
14:30 GMT	Thain 20'; Crawford 82'	Report	Gibson 47'	Stadium: Stamford Bridge; Attendance: 28,743; Referee: W.H. Burnell

26 November 1927 16	Port Vale	1–1	Chelsea	Hanley
14:35 GMT	Gillespie 35'	Report	Crawford 10'	Stadium: Old Recreation Ground; Attendance: 14,115; Referee: E.C. Sambrook

3 December 1927 17	Chelsea	6–0	South Shields	Fulham
14:30 GMT	Priestley 8'; Miller 26'; Thompson (x4)	Report		Stadium: Stamford Bridge; Attendance: 28,719; Referee: Percy Strouther

10 December 1927 18	Leeds United	5–0	Chelsea	Beeston
14:30 GMT	Jennings (x4); White 52'	Report		Stadium: Elland Road; Attendance: 22,059; Referee: Frank Burton

17 December 1927 19	Chelsea	2–0	Wolverhampton Wanderers	Fulham
14:30 GMT	Wilson 1'; Turnbull 88'	Report		Stadium: Stamford Bridge; Attendance: 24,340; Referee: C.F. Moon

24 December 1927 20	Barnsley	3–1	Chelsea	Barnsley
14:15 GMT	Tilson 7'; Proudfoot 27'; Curran (pen.)	Report	Priestley	Stadium: Oakwell; Attendance: 5,634; Referee: A.H. Price

26 December 1927 21	Grimsby Town	1–1	Chelsea	Cleethorpes
14:45 GMT	Coglin 38' (pen.)	Report	Turnbull 51'	Stadium: Blundell Park; Attendance: 18,630; Referee: John Rickwood

31 December 1927 22	Chelsea	0–0	Reading	Fulham
14:30 GMT		Report		Stadium: Stamford Bridge; Attendance: 26,525; Referee: Archie Caseley

7 January 1928 23	Blackpool	2–4	Chelsea	Blackpool
14:35 GMT	Browell 2'; Tremelling 39'	Report	Thompson 6'; Wilson 23'; Wilding; Ferguson	Stadium: Bloomfield Road; Attendance: 8,704; Referee: Harry Kingscott

21 January 1928 24	Chelsea	2–1	Fulham	Fulham
14:45 GMT	Wilson 4'; Thompson 45'	Report	Elliott 40'	Stadium: Stamford Bridge; Attendance: 42,297; Referee: F.W. Reeve

28 January 1928 25	Chelsea	1–0	Clapton Orient	Fulham
15:00 GMT	Wilding 36'	Report		Stadium: Stamford Bridge; Attendance: 17,875; Referee: Tom Botham

4 February 1928 26	West Bromwich Albion	3–0	Chelsea	West Bromwich
15:00 GMT	Short 58', 65'; Carter 86'	Report		Stadium: The Hawthorns; Attendance: 23,718; Referee: William Russell

11 February 1928 27	Chelsea	5–2	Bristol City	Fulham
15:15 GMT	Priestley 10', 19'; Thain 48'; Wilson 63'; Ferguson 72'	Report	Paul 30'; Cherrett 32'	Stadium: Stamford Bridge; Attendance: 31,949; Referee: Thomas Greaves

20 February 1928 28	Stoke City	1–0	Chelsea	Stoke
15:30 GMT	Bussey 67'	Report		Stadium: Victoria Ground; Attendance: 15,770; Referee: Charles Lines

25 February 1928 29	Chelsea	0–2	Southampton	Fulham
15:30 GMT		Report	Rawlings 11', 80'	Stadium: Stamford Bridge; Attendance: 46,567; Referee: E.C. Sambrook

3 March 1928 30	Hull City	0–2	Chelsea	Hull
15:00 GMT		Report	Thompson 4', 84'	Stadium: Anlaby Road; Attendance: 12,679; Referee: Tommy Crew

10 March 1928 31	Chelsea	2–1	Preston North End	Fulham
15:30 GMT	Law 20' (pen.); Thompson 35'	Report	James 10'	Stadium: Stamford Bridge; Attendance: 47,780; Referee: H.V. Stott

14 March 1928 32	Chelsea	4–0	Grimsby Town	Fulham
15:30 GMT	Thompson 10', 12', 37'; Thain 35'	Report		Stadium: Stamford Bridge; Attendance: 14,278; Referee: John Rickwood

17 March 1928 33	Swansea Town	0–0	Chelsea	Swansea
15:15 GMT		Report		Stadium: Vetch Field; Attendance: 15,563; Referee: William Russell

24 March 1928 34	Chelsea	0–1	Manchester City	Fulham
15:20 GMT		Report	Roberts 35'	Stadium: Stamford Bridge; Attendance: 51,813; Referee: Edwin Small

31 March 1928 35	Nottingham Forest	2–2	Chelsea	West Bridgford
15:15 GMT	Townsend 4'; Thompson 42' (pen.)	Report	Thompson 65'; Jackson 67'	Stadium: City Ground; Attendance: 10,989; Referee: W.H. Burnell

6 April 1928 36	Chelsea	2–1	Oldham Athletic	Fulham
15:15 GMT	Thain 20', 75'	Report	Pynegar 27' (pen.)	Stadium: Stamford Bridge; Attendance: 53,309; Referee: Tom Bryan

7 April 1928 37	Chelsea	1–0	Port Vale	Fulham
15:30 GMT	Crawford 12'	Report		Stadium: Stamford Bridge; Attendance: 39,278; Referee: E.C. Sambrook

9 April 1928 38	Oldham Athletic	2–1	Chelsea	Oldham
15:15 GMT	Watson 62'; Harris 85'	Report	Thain 28'	Stadium: Boundary Park; Attendance: 18,992; Referee: Tom Bryan

14 April 1928 39	South Shields	2–1	Chelsea	South Shields
15:15 GMT	Grenyer 40'; Matthewson 80'	Report	Irving 70'	Stadium: Horsley Hill; Attendance: 3,395; Referee: Percy Strouther

21 April 1928 40	Chelsea	2–3	Leeds United	Fulham
15:30 GMT	Rodgers 60'; Wilson 70'	Report	Keetley 15', 55'; White 40'	Stadium: Stamford Bridge; Attendance: 47,562; Referee: Frank Burton

28 April 1928 41	Wolverhampton Wanderers	1–2	Chelsea	Wolverhampton
15:15 GMT	Weaver 55'	Report	Jackson 17'; Wilson 25'	Stadium: Molineux Stadium; Attendance: 16,727; Referee: C.F. Moon

5 May 1928 42	Chelsea	1–2	Barnsley	Fulham
15:30 GMT	Biswell 67'	Report	Eaton (x2)	Stadium: Stamford Bridge; Attendance: 13,707; Referee: A.H. Price

=== FA Cup ===
Win Draw Loss Fixtures

14 January 1928 Third round	Wolverhampton Wanderers	2–1	Chelsea	Wolverhampton
14:30 GMT	Phillipson 7'; Baxter 73'	Report	Brown 21'	Stadium: Molineux Stadium; Attendance: 32,134; Referee: Tommy Crew
