= 1928–29 Chelsea F.C. season =

English football club season

Chelsea
1928–29 season
- Chairman: Claude Kirby
- Manager: David Calderhead
- Stadium: Stamford Bridge
- Second Division: 9th
- FA Cup: Fifth round
- Top goalscorer: League: George Biswell, Andrew Wilson (9); All: Jimmy Thompson, George Biswell, Andrew Wilson (9)
- Highest home attendance: 61,316 vs Everton (12 January 1929)
- Lowest home attendance: 7,086 vs West Bromwich Albion (17 April 1929)
- Average home league attendance: 28,475
- Biggest win: 4–0 v Swansea Town (25 August 1928)
- Biggest defeat: 1–4 v Tottenham Hotspur (20 April 1929)
Home colours	Away colours

The 1928–29 season was Chelsea Football Club's twentieth competitive season and fifth consecutive season in the Second Division. The club finished 9th in the league, narrowly missing out on promotion to the First Division.

== Players ==
Note: Flags indicate national team as defined under FIFA eligibility rules; some limited exceptions apply. Players may hold more than one non-FIFA nationality.

Pos.	Nation	Player
GK	ENG	Peter McKenna
GK	ENG	Sam Millington
DF	SCO	Tommy Law
DF	ENG	Leslie Odell
DF	SCO	George Rodgers
DF	SCO	George Smith
DF	ENG	John Townrow
MF	ENG	Sid Bishop
MF	IRL	Sam Irving
MF	ENG	Jack Meredith
MF	SCO	Willie Russell
FW	SCO	George Anderson

Pos.	Nation	Player
FW	ENG	George Biswell
FW	ENG	Jackie Crawford
FW	ENG	Sidney Elliott
FW	SCO	Willie Ferguson
FW	ENG	William Jackson
FW	ENG	Harold Miller
FW	ENG	George Pearson
FW	ENG	Albert Thain
FW	ENG	James Thompson
FW	ENG	Reginald Weaver
FW	SCO	Andrew Wilson

== Competitions ==
=== Overall record ===
Competition	First match	Last match	Starting round	Final position	Record							
Competition	First match	Last match	Starting round	Final position	Pld	W	D	L	GF	GA	GD	Win %
Second Division	25 August 1928	27 April 1929	Matchday 1	9th	42	17	10	15	64	65	−1	40.48
FA Cup	12 January 1929	20 February 1929	Third round	Fifth round	4	2	1	1	4	2	+2	50.00
Total					46	19	11	16	68	67	+1	41.30

Source: Stamford-bridge.com

=== Second Division ===
==== League table ====
Pos	Team	Pld	W	D	L	GF	GA	GAv	Pts
7	West Bromwich Albion	42	19	8	15	80	79	1.013	46
8	Blackpool	42	19	7	16	92	76	1.211	45
9	Chelsea	42	17	10	15	64	65	0.985	44
10	Tottenham Hotspur	42	17	9	16	75	81	0.926	43
11	Nottingham Forest	42	15	12	15	71	70	1.014	42

==== Results summary ====
Overall								Home						Away					
Pld	W	D	L	GF	GA	GAv	Pts	W	D	L	GF	GA	Pts	W	D	L	GF	GA	Pts
42	17	10	15	64	65	0.985	44	10	6	5	40	30	26	7	4	10	24	35	18

Source: Stamford-bridge.com

==== Matches ====
Win Draw Loss

25 August 1928 1	Chelsea	4–0	Swansea Town	Fulham
15:15 GMT	Elliott 23'; Crawford 72'; Pearson 78'; Biswell 87'	Report		Stadium: Stamford Bridge; Attendance: 47,264; Referee: Albert Caseley

27 August 1928 2	Bradford Park Avenue	1–2	Chelsea	Bradford
18:30 GMT	Quantrill 15' (pen.)	Report	Biswell 67'; Wilson 70'	Stadium: Park Avenue; Attendance: 20,801; Referee: Ernie Westwood

1 September 1928 3	Blackpool	0–1	Chelsea	Blackpool
15:15 GMT		Report	Wilson 4'	Stadium: Bloomfield Road; Attendance: 17,653; Referee: Tom Bryan

5 September 1928 4	Chelsea	3–1	Bradford Park Avenue	Fulham
18:00 GMT	Bishop 20'; Wilson 35'; Pearson 88'	Report	Robinson 49'	Stadium: Stamford Bridge; Attendance: 21,556; Referee: Ernie Westwood

8 September 1928 5	Chelsea	2–0	Middlesbrough	Fulham
15:15 GMT	Thain 15'; Pearson 80'	Report		Stadium: Stamford Bridge; Attendance: 48,775; Referee: William Bunnell

15 September 1928 6	Chelsea	1–0	Barnsley	Fulham
15:15 GMT	Wilson 27'	Report		Stadium: Stamford Bridge; Attendance: 34,793; Referee: G.S. Osell

22 September 1928 7	Bristol City	0–0	Chelsea	Ashton Gate
15:15 GMT		Report		Stadium: Ashton Gate Stadium; Attendance: 24,748; Referee: Tom Bryan

29 September 1928 8	Chelsea	3–0	Nottingham Forest	Fulham
15:15 GMT	Biswell 25', 75'; Jackson 90'	Report		Stadium: Stamford Bridge; Attendance: 38,139; Referee: William Harper

6 October 1928 9	West Bromwich Albion	3–0	Chelsea	West Bromwich
15:00 GMT	Bytheway 28'; Short 85'; Glidden 88'	Report		Stadium: The Hawthorns; Attendance: 28,969; Referee: R.O. Rees

13 October 1928 10	Chelsea	2–2	Clapton Orient	Fulham
15:15 GMT	Wilson 47', 67' (pen.)	Report	Turnbull 30'; Spence 80' (pen.)	Stadium: Stamford Bridge; Attendance: 39,890; Referee: F.W. Reeve

20 October 1928 11	Oldham Athletic	1–0	Chelsea	Oldham
15:00 GMT	Stanton 78'	Report		Stadium: Boundary Park; Attendance: 13,385; Referee: Thomas Greaves

27 October 1928 12	Chelsea	1–1	Southampton	Fulham
15:00 GMT	Meredith 4'	Report	Cribb 34' (pen.)	Stadium: Stamford Bridge; Attendance: 33,197; Referee: Gordon Franklin

3 November 1928 13	Wolverhampton Wanderers	1–1	Chelsea	Wolverhampton
15:00 GMT	Chadwick 69'	Report	Meredith 9'	Stadium: Molineux Stadium; Attendance: 22,178; Referee: J.V. Pennington

10 November 1928 14	Chelsea	2–1	Preston North End	Fulham
14:45 GMT	Meredith 8'; Wilson 23'	Report	Reid 80'	Stadium: Stamford Bridge; Attendance: 33,285; Referee: Ernie Pinckston

17 November 1928 15	Millwall	2–1	Chelsea	New Cross
14:30 GMT	Phillips 38'; Bryant 59'	Report	Meredith 30'	Stadium: The Den; Attendance: 37,774; Referee: W. Phipps

24 November 1928 16	Chelsea	3–3	Port Vale	Fulham
14:30 GMT	Biswell 16', 30'; Thain 18'	Report	Kirkham 15', 31'; Simms 86'	Stadium: Stamford Bridge; Attendance: 23,305; Referee: William Thomas

1 December 1928 17	Hull City	2–2	Chelsea	Hull
14:30 GMT	Walsh 21'; MacDonald 87' (pen.)	Report	Biswell 6'; Thain 30'	Stadium: Anlaby Road; Attendance: 16,925; Referee: F. Robinson

8 December 1928 18	Chelsea	1–1	Tottenham Hotspur	Fulham
14:30 GMT	Townrow 38'	Report	Armstrong 67'	Stadium: Stamford Bridge; Attendance: 45,840; Referee: E.C. Sambrook

15 December 1928 19	Reading	3–3	Chelsea	Reading
14:30 GMT	Meads 17'; Johnstone 57'; Goodwin	Report	Crawford 40'; Pearson 50'; Meredith 85'	Stadium: Elm Park; Attendance: 13,338; Referee: Stanley Rous

22 December 1928 20	Chelsea	1–1	Notts County	Fulham
14:30 GMT	Thain 1'	Report	Mills 61'	Stadium: Stamford Bridge; Attendance: 19,560; Referee: Albert Fogg

25 December 1928 21	Stoke City	0–1	Chelsea	Stoke
14:15 GMT		Report	Miller 5'	Stadium: Victoria Ground; Attendance: 21,862; Referee: Tom Botham

26 December 1928 22	Chelsea	3–1	Stoke City	Fulham
14:15 GMT	Thompson 44', 55', 76'	Report	Wilson 74'	Stadium: Stamford Bridge; Attendance: 15,251; Referee: Tom Botham

29 December 1928 23	Swansea Town	0–1	Chelsea	Swansea
14:30 GMT		Report	Thompson 12'	Stadium: Vetch Field; Attendance: 12,659; Referee: Albert Caseley

5 January 1929 24	Chelsea	2–3	Blackpool	Fulham
14:30 GMT	Pearson 64'; Irving 89'	Report	Neal 20'; Tremelling 42'; Hampson 44'	Stadium: Stamford Bridge; Attendance: 20,069; Referee: Tom Bryan

19 January 1929 25	Middlesbrough	4–5	Chelsea	Ayresome
14:45 GMT	Williams 10'; Pease 50' (pen.), 89'; Camsell 82'	Report	Law 30' (pen.); Miller 33'; Thompson 36', 42'; Thain 65'	Stadium: Ayresome Park; Attendance: 24,768; Referee: William Bunnell

30 January 1929 26	Barnsley	0–1	Chelsea	Barnsley
15:00 GMT		Report	Miller 33'	Stadium: Oakwell; Attendance: 7,886; Referee: G.S. Osell

2 February 1929 27	Chelsea	3–0	Bristol City	Fulham
15:00 GMT	Pearson 71'; Thompson 86', 90'	Report		Stadium: Stamford Bridge; Attendance: 19,768; Referee: Tom Bryan

9 February 1929 28	Nottingham Forest	3–0	Chelsea	West Bridgford
15:00 GMT	Stocks 13', 46'; Burton 51'	Report		Stadium: City Ground; Attendance: 10,829; Referee: William Harper

23 February 1929 29	Clapton Orient	1–0	Chelsea	Clapton
15:30 GMT	Whipp 67'	Report		Stadium: Millfields Road; Attendance: 18,844; Referee: F.W. Reeve

2 March 1929 30	Chelsea	2–3	Oldham Athletic	Fulham
15:15 GMT	Miller 21'; Odell 40' (pen.)	Report	Worrall 33'; Littlewood 67', 80'	Stadium: Stamford Bridge; Attendance: 29,538; Referee: Thomas Greaves

9 March 1929 31	Southampton	1–2	Chelsea	Southampton
15:15 GMT	Mackie 47'	Report	Pearson 54'; Biswell 78'	Stadium: The Dell; Attendance: 23,829; Referee: Ernie Pinckston

13 March 1929 32	Notts County	4–3	Chelsea	Nottingham
15:00 GMT	Fenner 9', 38'; Haden 27' (pen.); Andrews 40'	Report	Bishop 17'; Weaver 49', 86'	Stadium: Meadow Lane; Attendance: 11,235; Referee: Albert Fogg

16 March 1929 33	Chelsea	0–2	Wolverhampton Wanderers	Fulham
15:15 GMT		Report	Hartill 23', 37'	Stadium: Stamford Bridge; Attendance: 30,383; Referee: J.V. Pennington

23 March 1929 34	Preston North End	3–0	Chelsea	Preston
15:15 GMT	James 30'; Harrison 44'; Hair 62'	Report		Stadium: Deepdale; Attendance: 14,415; Referee: Ernie Pinckston

29 March 1929 35	Grimsby Town	1–0	Chelsea	Cleethorpes
14:30 GMT	Bestall	Report		Stadium: Blundell Park; Attendance: 23,644; Referee: Albert Caseley

30 March 1929 36	Chelsea	0–3	Millwall	Fulham
15:30 GMT		Report	Cock 75', 85'; Black 76'	Stadium: Stamford Bridge; Attendance: 42,637; Referee: William Russell

1 April 1929 37	Chelsea	3–2	Grimsby Town	Fulham
15:30 GMT	Weaver 14'; Jackson 27'; Townrow	Report	Coleman 15'; Wrack 55'	Stadium: Stamford Bridge; Attendance: 25,079; Referee: Albert Caseley

6 April 1929 38	Port Vale	1–0	Chelsea	Hanley
15:30 GMT	Pynegar 21'	Report		Stadium: Old Recreation Ground; Attendance: 11,701; Referee: William Thomas

13 April 1929 39	Chelsea	0–0	Hull City	Fulham
15:30 GMT		Report		Stadium: Stamford Bridge; Attendance: 9,654; Referee: F. Robinson

17 April 1929 40	Chelsea	2–5	West Bromwich Albion	Fulham
17:30 GMT	Elliott; Odell (pen.)	Report	Glidden 12', 67'; Evans 90'; Carr (o.g.); Carter	Stadium: Stamford Bridge; Attendance: 7,086; Referee: R.O. Rees

20 April 1929 41	Tottenham Hotspur	4–1	Chelsea	Tottenham
15:15 GMT	Harper 36', 40', 87'; O'Callaghan 61'	Report	Elliott 69'	Stadium: White Hart Lane; Attendance: 24,356; Referee: E.C. Sambrook

27 April 1929 42	Chelsea	2–1	Reading	Fulham
15:30 GMT	Weaver 2'; Wilson	Report	Oswald 69'	Stadium: Stamford Bridge; Attendance: 12,898; Referee: Stanley Rous

=== FA Cup ===
Win Draw Loss

12 January 1929 Third round	Chelsea	2–0	Everton	Fulham
14:30 GMT	Thompson 82'; Miller 88'	Report		Stadium: Stamford Bridge; Attendance: 61,316; Referee: Leslie Watson

26 January 1929 Fourth round	Chelsea	1–0	Birmingham	Fulham
14:45 GMT	Miller 8'	Report		Stadium: Stamford Bridge; Attendance: 56,953; Referee: Tommy Crew

16 February 1929 Fifth round	Chelsea	1–1	Portsmouth	Fulham
15:00 GMT	Law 5' (pen.)	Report	Weddle 41'	Stadium: Stamford Bridge; Attendance: 38,474; Referee: Albert Fogg

20 February 1929 Fifth round replay	Portsmouth	1–0	Chelsea	Portsmouth
15:00 GMT	Weddle 36'	Report		Stadium: Fratton Park; Attendance: 31,966; Referee: Albert Fogg
