= 1929–30 Chelsea F.C. season =

English football club season

Chelsea
1929–30 season
- Chairman: Claude Kirby
- Manager: David Calderhead
- Stadium: Stamford Bridge
- Second Division: 2nd
- FA Cup: Third round
- Top goalscorer: League: George Mills (14); All: George Mills (14)
- Highest home attendance: 53,819 vs Blackpool (26 December 1929)
- Lowest home attendance: 11,353 vs Barnsley (11 September 1929)
- Average home league attendance: 27,703
- Biggest win: 5–0 v Preston North End (21 December 1929)
- Biggest defeat: 2–4 v Southampton (21 September 1929)
Home colours	Away colours

The 1929–30 season was Chelsea Football Club's 21st competitive season and after 6th consecutive season in the Second Division. The club finished as runner-up in the Second Division, securing promotion to the First Division 1930-31.

== Players ==
Note: Flags indicate national team as defined under FIFA eligibility rules; some limited exceptions apply. Players may hold more than one non-FIFA nationality.

Pos.	Nation	Player
GK	ENG	Frank Higgs
GK	ENG	Peter McKenna
GK	ENG	Sam Millington
DF	SCO	Tommy Law
DF	ENG	Leslie Odell
DF	SCO	George Rodgers
DF	SCO	George Smith
DF	ENG	John Townrow
MF	ENG	Sid Bishop
MF	IRL	Sam Irving
MF	ENG	Jack Meredith
MF	SCO	Willie Russell

Pos.	Nation	Player
FW	ENG	George Biswell
FW	ENG	Jackie Crawford
FW	ENG	Sidney Elliott
FW	SCO	Willie Ferguson
FW	ENG	William Jackson
FW	ENG	Harold Miller
FW	ENG	George Mills
FW	ENG	George Pearson
FW	ENG	Albert Thain
FW	ENG	Reginald Weaver
FW	SCO	Andrew Wilson

== Table ==
Pos	Team	Pld	W	D	L	GF	GA	GAv	Pts	Relegation
1	Blackpool (C, P)	42	27	4	11	98	67	1.463	58	Promotion to the First Division
2	Chelsea (P)	42	22	11	9	74	46	1.609	55	Promotion to the First Division
3	Oldham Athletic	42	21	11	10	90	51	1.765	53	
4	Bradford (Park Avenue)	42	19	12	11	91	70	1.300	50	
5	Bury	42	22	5	15	78	67	1.164	49	

Rules for classification: 1) Points; 2) Goal average; 3) Goals scored
(C) Champions; (P) Promoted
