= List of Chelsea F.C. players =

Chelsea Football Club are an association football club based in Fulham, West London. Founded in 1905, they play in the Premier League. Below is a list of all the players who made at least 100 appearances for the club.

== Key ==
- Appearances as a substitute are included. This feature of the game was introduced in the Football League at the start of the 1965–66 season.

Positions key
Pre-1960s		1960s–	
GK	Goalkeeper		
FB	Full back	DF	Defender
HB	Half back	MF	Midfielder
FW	Forward		

Nationality
The nationality of a player is determined by the country which he has played for during their Chelsea career, or if said person has not played international football, their country of birth.
Position
Playing positions are listed according to the tactical formations that were employed at the time. Thus the change in the names of defensive and midfield positions reflects the tactical evolution that occurred from the 1960s onwards.
Club career
Club career is defined as the first and last calendar years in which the player signed for and left Chelsea.
Total appearances and Total goals
Total appearances and goals comprise those in the Football League, Premier League, FA Cup, Football League Cup, FA Charity / Community Shield, European Cup / UEFA Champions League, UEFA Cup / UEFA Europa League, UEFA Conference League, Inter-Cities Fairs Cup, European Cup Winners' Cup / UEFA Cup Winners' Cup, Full Members' Cup, UEFA Super Cup and FIFA Club World Cup. Matches in friendlies and wartime competitions are excluded.

== Players ==
- **Bold** indicates players currently playing for the club.
- † indicates players who are currently out on loan.
- Italic indicates players who are academy graduates.

As of 21 November 2026

List of Chelsea F.C. players with 100 or more appearances
Player	Nationality	Pos	Club career	Starts	Subs	Total	Goals
Player	Nationality	Pos	Club career	Appearances			Goals
Tommy Miller	Scotland	FB	1905–1909	120	0	120	0
Bob McRoberts	Scotland	FW	1905–1911	106	0	106	10
Jimmy Windridge	England	FW	1905–1911	152	0	152	58
Ted Birnie	England	FB	1906–1909	107	0	107	3
George Hilsdon	England	FW	1906–1912	164	0	164	108
Billy Bridgeman	England	FB	1906–1919	159	0	159	23
Jock Cameron	Scotland	HB	1907–1913	194	0	194	0
Jack Whitley	England	GK	1907–1914	138	0	138	0
Ben Warren	England	HB	1908–1911	101	0	101	4
Angus Douglas	Scotland	FW	1908–1913	103	0	103	10
Charlie Freeman	England	FW	1908–1921	104	0	104	22
Samuel Downing	England	HB	1909–1914	145	0	145	11
Vivian Woodward	England	FW	1909–1915	116	0	116	34
Fred Taylor	England	HB	1909–1917	171	0	171	4
Alec Ormiston	Scotland	HB	1909–1919	103	0	103	1
Walter Bettridge	England	HB	1909–1922	254	0	254	0
Bob Whittingham	England	FW	1910–1913; 1919	129	0	129	81
Jim Molyneux	England	GK	1910–1923	239	0	239	0
Jack Harrow	England	FB	1911–1926	334	0	334	5
Harry Ford	England	FW	1912–1924	248	0	248	47
Harold Halse	England	FB	1913–1921	111	0	111	24
Tommy Logan	Scotland	FB	1913–1922	116	0	116	8
Jimmy Croal	Scotland	FW	1914–1922	130	0	130	26
Bob McNeil	Scotland	FW	1914–1927	306	0	306	32
Jack Cock	England	FW	1919–1923	111	0	111	53
Harry Wilding	England	FB	1919–1928	265	0	265	26
Tommy Meehan	England	HB	1920–1924	133	0	133	4
John Priestley	Scotland	HB	1920–1928	204	0	204	19
George W. Smith	Scotland	FB	1921–1932	370	0	370	0
Albert Thain	England	FW	1922–1930	153	0	153	51
Willie Ferguson	Scotland	FW	1922–1933	294	0	294	11
Andrew Wilson	Scotland	FW	1923–1931	253	0	253	61
Jackie Crawford	England	FW	1923–1934	308	0	308	28
Harold Miller	England	FW	1923–1939	365	0	365	45
George Rodgers	Scotland	FB	1924–1931	122	0	122	2
Leslie Odell	England	FB	1924–1936	103	0	103	7
Tommy Law	Scotland	FB	1925–1939	318	0	318	19
Sam Millington	England	GK	1926–1933	245	0	245	0
George Pearson	England	FW	1926–1933	215	0	215	37
Jack Townrow	England	FB	1927–1932	140	0	140	3
Willie Russell	Scotland	HB	1927–1935	160	0	160	6
Sid Bishop	England	HB	1928–1933	109	0	109	6
George Mills	England	FW	1929–1943	239	0	239	125
Hughie Gallacher	Scotland	FW	1930–1934	144	0	144	81
George Barber	England	FB	1930–1941	294	0	294	1
Vic Woodley	England	GK	1931–1945	272	0	272	0
Eric Oakton	England	MF	1932–1937	112	0	112	30
Len Allum	England	FB	1932–1939	102	0	102	2
John O'Hare	Scotland	FB	1932–1941	108	0	108	0
Allan Craig	Scotland	FB	1933–1939	211	0	211	0
George Gibson	Scotland	FW	1933–1939	143	0	143	23
Billy Mitchell	Ireland	HB	1933–1940	118	0	118	3
Jimmy Argue	Scotland	FW	1933–1947	125	0	125	35
Dick Spence	England	FW	1934–1948	246	0	246	66
Harry Burgess	England	FW	1935–1942	155	0	155	37
Sam Weaver	England	HB	1936–1945	125	0	125	4
Len Goulden	England	FW	1945–1950	111	0	111	19
John Harris	Scotland	FB	1945–1956	364	0	364	14
Tommy Walker	Scotland	FW	1946–1948	105	0	105	24
Danny Winter	Wales	FB	1946–1951	155	0	155	0
Harry Medhurst	England	GK	1946–1952	157	0	157	0
Sydney Bathgate	Scotland	FB	1946–1953	147	0	147	0
Ken Armstrong	England	HB	1946–1957	402	0	402	30
William Dickson	Northern Ireland	HB	1947–1953	119	0	119	4
Bobby Campbell	Scotland	HB	1947–1954	213	0	213	40
Billy Hughes	England	FB	1948–1951	105	0	105	0
Billy Gray	England	FW	1948–1953	172	0	172	15
Roy Bentley	England	FW	1948–1956	367	0	367	150
Stan Willemse	England	FB	1949–1956	221	0	221	2
Eric Parsons	England	FW	1950–1956	177	0	177	42
Bill Robertson	Scotland	GK	1951–1960	215	0	215	0
Johnny McNichol	Scotland	FW	1952–1958	202	0	202	66
Les Stubbs	England	FW	1952–1958	123	0	123	35
Derek Saunders	England	HB	1953–1959	223	0	223	9
Ron Tindall	England	FW	1953–1961	174	0	174	69
Peter Sillett	England	FB	1953–1962	288	0	288	34
Frank Blunstone	England	FW	1953–1964	347	0	347	54
Peter Brabrook	England	FW	1954–1962	271	0	271	57
John Sillett	England	FB	1954–1962	102	0	102	1
Reg Matthews	England	GK	1956–1961	148	0	148	0
Mel Scott	England	DF	1956–1963	104	0	104	0
John Mortimore	England	HB	1956–1965	279	0	279	10
Jimmy Greaves	England	FW	1957–1961	169	0	169	132
Ken Shellito	England	FB	1959–1965	123	0	123	2
Barry Bridges	England	FW	1958–1966	203	2	205	93
Bobby Tambling	England	FW	1959–1970	366	4	370	202
Peter Bonetti	England	GK	1959–1975; 1976–1979	729	0	729	0
Allan Harris	England	DF	1960–1964; 1966–1967	98	4	102	1
Terry Venables	England	MF	1960–1966	237	0	237	31
Bert Murray	England	FW	1961–1966	179	4	183	44
Eddie McCreadie	Scotland	DF	1962–1973	405	5	410	5
Ron Harris	England	DF	1962–1980	784	11	795	14
Peter Houseman	England	MF	1963–1975	325	18	343	39
John Hollins	England	MF	1963–1975; 1983–1984	592	0	592	64
Marvin Hinton	England	DF	1963–1976	328	16	344	4
George Graham	Scotland	FW	1964–1966	102	0	102	46
John Boyle	Scotland	MF	1964–1973	253	13	266	12
Peter Osgood	England	FW	1964–1974; 1978–1979	376	4	380	150
Charlie Cooke	Scotland	FW	1966–1972; 1974–1978	360	13	373	30
Tommy Baldwin	England	MF	1966–1974	228	11	239	92
David Webb	England	DF	1968–1974	299	0	299	33
Ian Hutchinson	England	FW	1968–1976	137	7	144	58
Alan Hudson	England	MF	1969–1974; 1983–1984	188	1	189	14
John Dempsey	Republic of Ireland	DF	1969–1978	200	7	207	7
John Phillips	Wales	GK	1970–1980	149	0	149	0
Micky Droy	England	DF	1970–1985	302	11	313	19
Chris Garland	England	MF	1971–1974	111	3	114	31
Steve Kember	England	MF	1971–1975	144	6	150	15
Gary Stanley	England	MF	1971–1979	115	5	120	15
Gary Locke	England	DF	1971–1983	315	2	317	4
Bill Garner	England	FW	1972–1978	105	14	119	36
Ian Britton	Scotland	MF	1972–1982	279	10	289	34
Graham Wilkins	England	FB	1972–1982	148	1	149	1
Kenny Swain	England	MF/FW	1973–1978	127	5	132	29
Ray Wilkins	England	MF	1973–1979	193	5	198	33
Steve Wicks	England	DF	1974–1978; 1986–1988	163	1	164	9
David Hay	Scotland	MF	1974–1980	118	2	120	3
Tommy Langley	England	FW	1974–1980	139	13	152	43
Clive Walker	England	FW	1976–1984	191	33	224	65
Gary Chivers	England	DF	1978–1983	143	5	148	4
Mike Fillery	England	FW	1978–1983	176	5	181	41
John Bumstead	England	MF	1978–1991	379	30	409	44
Petar Borota	Yugoslavia	GK	1979–1982	114	0	114	0
Peter Rhoades-Brown	England	FW	1979–1984	97	12	109	5
Colin Pates	England	DF	1979–1988	345	1	346	10
Chris Hutchings	England	DF	1980–1983	97	4	101	3
Colin Lee	England	FW	1980–1987	200	23	223	41
Paul Canoville	England	FW	1981–1986	67	36	103	15
David Speedie	Scotland	FW	1982–1987	197	8	205	64
Nigel Spackman	England	MF	1983–1987; 1992–1996	254	13	267	14
Pat Nevin	Scotland	FW	1983–1988	237	5	242	45
Eddie Niedzwiecki	Wales	GK	1983–1988	175	0	175	0
Joe McLaughlin	Scotland	DF	1983–1989	268	0	268	7
Kerry Dixon	England	FW	1983–1992	413	7	420	193
Doug Rougvie	Scotland	DF	1984–1987	100	0	100	3
Darren Wood	England	FB	1984–1989	167	11	178	4
Micky Hazard	England	MF	1985–1990	94	9	103	12
Kevin McAllister	Scotland	FW	1985–1991	101	39	140	13
Gordon Durie	Scotland	FW	1986–1991	145	8	153	63
Gareth Hall	Wales	MF	1986–1996	148	23	171	5
Clive Wilson	England	DF	1987–1990	85	18	103	5
Tony Dorigo	England	DF	1987–1991	180	0	180	12
Kevin Wilson	Northern Ireland	FW	1987–1992	155	36	191	55
Graeme Le Saux	England	DF	1987–1993; 1997–2003	280	32	312	16
Steve Clarke	Scotland	DF	1987–1998	407	14	421	10
David Lee	England	DF	1988–1998	148	46	194	13
Kevin Hitchcock	England	GK	1988–2001	131	4	135	0
Ken Monkou	Netherlands	DF	1989–1992	117	2	119	2
Dave Beasant	England	GK	1989–1993	157	0	157	0
Graham Stuart	England	MF	1989–1993	89	21	110	18
Craig Burley	Scotland	MF	1989–1997	105	32	137	11
Erland Johnsen	Norway	DF	1989–1997	170	13	183	1
Andy Townsend	Republic of Ireland	MF	1990–1993	138	0	138	19
Frank Sinclair	Jamaica	DF	1990–1998	211	7	218	13
Eddie Newton	England	MF	1990–1999	181	33	214	10
Dennis Wise	England	MF	1990–2001	434	11	445	75
Andy Myers	England	DF	1991–1999	89	17	106	2
John Spencer	Scotland	FW	1992–1997	100	37	137	43
Dmitri Kharine	Russia	GK	1992–1999	146	0	146	0
Gavin Peacock	England	MF	1993–1996	119	15	134	27
Michael Duberry	England	DF	1993–1999	106	9	115	3
Mark Hughes	Wales	FW	1995–1998	109	14	123	39
Dan Petrescu	Romania	DF	1995–2000	186	22	208	24
Frank Leboeuf	France	DF	1996–2001	200	4	204	24
Roberto Di Matteo	Italy	MF	1996–2002	155	20	175	26
Jody Morris	England	MF	1996–2003	113	60	173	9
Gianfranco Zola	Italy	FW	1996–2003	260	52	312	80
Tore André Flo	Norway	FW	1997–2000	94	69	163	50
Gustavo Poyet	Uruguay	MF	1997–2001	110	35	145	49
Ed de Goey	Netherlands	GK	1997–2003	178	1	179	0
Celestine Babayaro	Nigeria	DF	1997–2005	177	20	197	8
Albert Ferrer	Spain	DF	1998–2003	105	8	113	1
Marcel Desailly	France	DF	1998–2004	219	3	222	7
John Terry	England	DF	1998–2017	686	31	717	67
Mario Melchiot	Netherlands	DF	1999–2004	149	16	165	5
Carlo Cudicini	Italy	GK	1999–2009	210	6	216	0
Jesper Grønkjær	Denmark	FW	2000–2004	77	42	119	11
Jimmy Floyd Hasselbaink	Netherlands	FW	2000–2004	156	21	177	87
Eiður Guðjohnsen	Iceland	FW	2000–2006	177	86	263	78
William Gallas	France	DF	2001–2006	213	12	225	14
Frank Lampard	England	MF	2001–2014	593	55	648	211
Damien Duff	Republic of Ireland	FW	2003–2006	95	30	125	19
Geremi	Cameroon	MF	2003–2007	74	35	109	4
Claude Makélélé	France	MF	2003–2008	201	16	217	2
Wayne Bridge	England	DF	2003–2009	124	18	142	4
Joe Cole	England	MF	2003–2010	189	93	282	39
Arjen Robben	Netherlands	FW	2004–2007	74	32	106	19
Ricardo Carvalho	Portugal	DF	2004–2010	203	7	210	11
Alex	Brazil	DF	2004–2012	115	19	134	10
Didier Drogba	Ivory Coast	FW	2004–2012; 2014–2015	288	93	381	164
Paulo Ferreira	Portugal	DF	2004–2013	167	50	217	2
Petr Čech	Czech Republic	GK	2004–2015	492	2	494	0
Shaun Wright-Phillips	England	FW	2005–2008	65	60	125	10
Michael Essien	Ghana	MF	2005–2014	223	33	256	25
Michael Ballack	Germany	MF	2006–2010	140	27	167	26
Salomon Kalou	Ivory Coast	FW	2006–2012	147	107	254	60
Ashley Cole	England	DF	2006–2014	325	13	338	7
John Obi Mikel	Nigeria	MF	2006–2017	282	90	372	6
Florent Malouda	France	FW	2007–2013	173	56	229	45
Nicolas Anelka	France	FW	2008–2012	145	39	184	59
José Bosingwa	Portugal	DF	2008–2012	111	15	126	3
Branislav Ivanović	Serbia	DF	2008–2017	352	25	377	34
Nemanja Matić	Serbia	MF	2009–2011; 2014–2017	134	20	154	7
Ramires	Brazil	MF	2010–2016	204	47	251	34
Juan Mata	Spain	MF	2011–2014	116	19	135	33
David Luiz	Brazil	DF	2011–2014; 2016–2019	232	16	248	18
Fernando Torres	Spain	FW	2011–2015	117	55	172	45
Thibaut Courtois	Belgium	GK	2011–2018	154	0	154	0
Oscar	Brazil	MF	2012–2017	147	56	203	38
Gary Cahill	England	DF	2012–2019	270	20	290	25
Eden Hazard	Belgium	FW	2012–2019	297	55	352	110
Victor Moses	Nigeria	DF	2012–2021	98	30	128	18
César Azpilicueta	Spain	DF	2012–2023	467	41	508	17
Willian	Brazil	FW	2013–2020	250	89	339	63
Diego Costa	Spain	FW	2014–2017	109	11	120	59
Cesc Fàbregas	Spain	MF	2014–2019	159	39	198	22
Kurt Zouma	France	DF	2014–2021	124	27	151	10
Andreas Christensen	Denmark	DF	2014–2022	146	15	161	2
Ruben Loftus-Cheek	England	MF	2014–2023	74	81	155	13
Pedro	Spain	FW	2015–2020	140	66	206	43
Marcos Alonso	Spain	DF	2016–2022	199	13	212	29
N'Golo Kanté	France	MF	2016–2023	232	37	269	13
Antonio Rüdiger	Germany	DF	2017–2022	195	8	203	12
Mason Mount	England	MF	2017–2023	158	37	195	33
Olivier Giroud	France	FW	2018–2021	60	59	119	39
Ross Barkley	England	MF	2018–2022	56	44	100	12
Callum Hudson-Odoi	England	FW	2018–2023	66	60	126	16
Jorginho	Italy	MF	2018–2023	187	26	213	29
Mateo Kovačić	Croatia	MF	2018–2023	164	57	221	6
Kepa Arrizabalaga	Spain	GK	2018–2025	160	3	163	0
Trevoh Chalobah	England	DF	2018–2026	121	30	151	8
**Reece James**	England	DF	2018–	174	61	235	16
Christian Pulisic	United States	FW	2019–2023	83	62	145	26
Édouard Mendy	Senegal	GK	2020–2023	104	1	105	0
Kai Havertz	Germany	FW	2020–2023	102	37	139	32
Thiago Silva	Brazil	DF	2020–2024	140	15	155	9
Hakim Ziyech	Morocco	FW	2020–2024	60	47	107	14
Ben Chilwell	England	DF	2020–2025	83	24	107	9
Marc Cucurella	Spain	DF	2022–2026	141	22	163	9
Enzo Fernández	Argentina	MF	2023–2026	152	18	170	31
**Moisés Caicedo**	Ecuador	MF	2023–	146	10	156	8
**Malo Gusto**	France	DF	2023–	99	46	145	3
**Cole Palmer**	England	MF	2023–	128	16	144	59
**Robert Sánchez** †	Spain	GK	2023–	111	1	112	0
**Pedro Neto**	Portugal	FW	2024–	92	25	117	23

== List of captains ==
Captain	Period	Apps	Goals	Honours											
Captain	Period	Apps	Goals	League	FAC.	LC.	CS.	UCL.	UEL.	UEC.	USC.	CWC.	FCWC.	FMC.	Total
(England) Roy Bentley	1953–1956	367	150	1954–55			1955								2
(England) Ken Armstrong	1956–1957	402	30												0
(England) Derek Saunders	1957–1959	223	9												0
(England) Frank Blunstone	1959–1964	347	54												0
(England) Terry Venables	1964–1966	237	31			1965									1
(England) Ron Harris	1966–1980	795	13		1970							1971			2
(England) Micky Droy	1980–1984	313	19												0
(England) Colin Pates	1984–1988	346	10	1983–84										1986	2
(England) Graham Roberts	1988–1990	83	22	1988–89											1
(Wales) Peter Nicholas	1990–1991	93	2											1990	1
(Republic of Ireland) Andy Townsend	1991–1993	138	19												0
(England) Dennis Wise	1993–2001	435	75		1997; 2000	1998	2000				1998	1998			6
(France) Marcel Desailly	2001–2004	222	7												0
(England) John Terry	2004–2017	717	67	2004–05; 2005–06; 2009–10; 2014–15; 2016–17	2007; 2009; 2010; 2012	2005; 2007; 2015	2005; 2009	2012	2013						16
(England) Gary Cahill	2017–2019	290	25		2018				2019						2
(Spain) César Azpilicueta	2019–2023	508	17					2021			2021		2022		3
(England) Reece James	2023–	235	16							2025			2025		2

Italic Indicates captains who won the League in the Second Division.

== See also ==
- List of Chelsea F.C. players (1–24 appearances)
- List of Chelsea F.C. players (25–99 appearances)
