= 1926–27 Chelsea F.C. season =

English football club season

Chelsea
1926–27 season
- Chairman: Claude Kirby
- Manager: David Calderhead
- Stadium: Stamford Bridge
- Second Division: 4th
- FA Cup: Quarter-finals
- Top goalscorer: League: Bob Turnbull (17); All: Bob Turnbull (23)
- Highest home attendance: 70,184 vs Cardiff City (29 January 1927)
- Lowest home attendance: 15,572 vs Notts County (6 September 1926)
- Average home league attendance: 29,861
- Biggest win: 7–2 v Accrington Stanley (8 January 1927)
- Biggest defeat: 0–5 v Notts County (13 September 1926)
Home colours	Away colours

The 1926–27 season was Chelsea Football Club's eighteenth competitive season.

== Players ==
Note: Flags indicate national team as defined under FIFA eligibility rules; some limited exceptions apply. Players may hold more than one non-FIFA nationality.

Pos.	Nation	Player
GK	ENG	Sam Millington
GK	ENG	Peter McKenna
DF	SCO	Tommy Law
DF	ENG	Harold Miller
DF	ENG	Harry Wilding
DF	SCO	George Rodgers
DF	SCO	George Smith
DF	ENG	John Townrow
DF	ENG	Fred Barrett
MF	ENG	Billy Brown

Pos.	Nation	Player
MF	SCO	John Priestley
FW	ENG	George Stone
FW	ENG	Jackie Crawford
FW	SCO	Willie Ferguson
FW	ENG	George Pearson
FW	SCO	Bob McNeil
FW	ENG	Albert Thain
FW	SCO	Andrew Wilson
FW	SCO	Bob Turnbull

== Competitions ==
=== Overall record ===
Competition	First match	Last match	Starting round	Final position	Record							
Competition	First match	Last match	Starting round	Final position	Pld	W	D	L	GF	GA	GD	Win %
Second Division	28 August 1926	7 May 1927	Matchday 1	4th	42	20	12	10	62	52	+10	47.62
FA Cup	8 January 1927	9 March 1927	Third round	Sixth round	5	3	1	1	15	6	+9	60.00
Total					47	23	13	11	77	58	+19	48.94

Source: Stamford-bridge.com

=== Second Division ===
==== League table ====
Pos	Team	Pld	W	D	L	GF	GA	GAv	Pts	Promotion or relegation
2	Portsmouth (P)	42	23	8	11	87	49	1.776	54	Promotion to the First Division
3	Manchester City	42	22	10	10	108	61	1.770	54	
4	Chelsea	42	20	12	10	62	52	1.192	52	
5	Nottingham Forest	42	18	14	10	80	55	1.455	50	
6	Preston North End	42	20	9	13	74	72	1.028	49	

(P) Promoted

==== Results summary ====
Overall								Home						Away					
Pld	W	D	L	GF	GA	GAv	Pts	W	D	L	GF	GA	Pts	W	D	L	GF	GA	Pts
42	20	12	10	62	52	1.192	52	13	7	1	40	17	33	7	5	9	22	35	19

Source: Stamford-bridge.com

==== Matches ====
Win Draw Loss Fixtures

28 August 1926 1	Chelsea	3–0	Middlesbrough	Fulham
15:30 GMT	McNeil 42'; Thain 70'; Miller 86'	Report		Stadium: Stamford Bridge; Attendance: 29,849; Referee: Archie Caseley

30 August 1926 2	Wolverhampton Wanderers	0–3	Chelsea	Wolverhampton
17:45 GMT		Report	Brown 12'; Miller 88'; Turnbull 89'	Stadium: Molineux Stadium; Attendance: 16,874; Referee: Percy Strouther

4 September 1926 3	Port Vale	0–0	Chelsea	Hanley
15:15 GMT		Report		Stadium: Old Recreation Ground; Attendance: 14,720; Referee: Tommy Crew

6 September 1926 4	Chelsea	2–0	Notts County	Fulham
18:00 GMT	Turnbull 33', 61'	Report		Stadium: Stamford Bridge; Attendance: 15,572; Referee: Harry Sykes

11 September 1926 5	Chelsea	2–3	Southampton	Fulham
15:30 GMT	Barrett 70'; Turnbull 84'	Report	Rawlings 1', 5', 32'	Stadium: Stamford Bridge; Attendance: 30,298; Referee: H.P. Hinderer

13 September 1926 6	Notts County	5–0	Chelsea	Nottingham
18:00 GMT	Barry 34'; Smith 37' (pen.); Harris 59'; Davis 70'; Mills 74'	Report		Stadium: Meadow Lane; Attendance: 9,094; Referee: Harry Sykes

18 September 1926 7	Bradford City	0–1	Chelsea	Bradford
15:00 GMT		Report	Thain 27'	Stadium: Valley Parade; Attendance: 16,350; Referee: Edwin Small

25 September 1926 8	Chelsea	2–2	Fulham	Fulham
15:30 GMT	Pearson 12'; Turnbull	Report	Tonner 30'; McNab (pen.)	Stadium: Stamford Bridge; Attendance: 46,084; Referee: J.C. O'Neill

2 October 1926 9	Chelsea	2–1	Preston North End	Fulham
15:30 GMT	Thain 24', 34'	Report	Roberts 2'	Stadium: Stamford Bridge; Attendance: 32,398; Referee: Archie Caseley

9 October 1926 10	South Shields	5–1	Chelsea	South Shields
15:00 GMT	Metcalf 1'; Oxberry 3'; Matthewson 9', 35'; Ridley 47' (pen.)	Report	Priestley 62'	Stadium: Horsley Hill; Attendance: 3,705; Referee: Albert Fogg

16 October 1926 11	Portsmouth	2–3	Chelsea	Portsmouth
15:00 GMT	Goodwin 30'; Moffatt 83'	Report	Turnbull 42', 44'; Miller 85'	Stadium: Fratton Park; Attendance: 17,689; Referee: C.F. Moon

23 October 1926 12	Chelsea	1–0	Oldham Athletic	Fulham
15:00 GMT	Turnbull 42'	Report		Stadium: Stamford Bridge; Attendance: 25,232; Referee: Noah Shuker

30 October 1926 13	Grimsby Town	0–0	Chelsea	Cleethorpes
15:00 GMT		Report		Stadium: Blundell Park; Attendance: 12,423; Referee: George Watson

6 November 1926 14	Chelsea	1–1	Blackpool	Fulham
14:45 GMT	Crawford 56'	Report	Binks 7'	Stadium: Stamford Bridge; Attendance: 25,366; Referee: Archie Caseley

13 November 1926 15	Reading	2–1	Chelsea	Reading
14:45 GMT	Robson 40'; Richardson 86'	Report	Thain 5'	Stadium: Elm Park; Attendance: 11,589; Referee: Harry Sykes

20 November 1926 16	Chelsea	2–2	Swansea Town	Fulham
14:30 GMT	Brown 35', 67'	Report	Thompson 37'; Fowler 63'	Stadium: Stamford Bridge; Attendance: 18,140; Referee: Edwin Small

27 November 1926 17	Nottingham Forest	4–1	Chelsea	West Bridgford
14:30 GMT	Barratt 50' (pen.); Jones 55'; Burton 70'; Stocks 80'	Report	Pearson 7'	Stadium: City Ground; Attendance: 12,841; Referee: Ernie Pinckston

4 December 1926 18	Chelsea	4–2	Barnsley	Fulham
14:30 GMT	Brown 20', 42', 49'; Thain 85'	Report	Ferguson 48' (o.g.); Fletcher 75'	Stadium: Stamford Bridge; Attendance: 21,904; Referee: Harry Sykes

11 December 1926 19	Manchester City	1–0	Chelsea	Moss Side
14:15 GMT	Bell 18'	Report		Stadium: Maine Road; Attendance: 26,868; Referee: R.O. Rees

18 December 1926 20	Chelsea	2–2	Darlington	Fulham
14:30 GMT	Crawford 10'; Priestley 78'	Report	Ruddy 30', 62'	Stadium: Stamford Bridge; Attendance: 19,953; Referee: Francis Couldrey

25 December 1926 21	Chelsea	1–0	Hull City	Fulham
11:30 GMT	Thain 40'	Report		Stadium: Stamford Bridge; Attendance: 34,306; Referee: Frank Warriss

27 December 1926 22	Hull City	0–1	Chelsea	Hull
14:15 GMT		Report	Brown 49'	Stadium: Anlaby Road; Attendance: 23,440; Referee: Frank Warriss

1 January 1927 23	Chelsea	2–1	Clapton Orient	Fulham
14:30 GMT	Priestley 40' (pen.), 65' (pen.)	Report	Broadbent 20'	Stadium: Stamford Bridge; Attendance: 28,279; Referee: William Thomas

15 January 1927 24	Middlesbrough	0–0	Chelsea	Ayresome
14:30 GMT		Report		Stadium: Ayresome Park; Attendance: 23,964; Referee: F. Robinson

5 February 1927 25	Chelsea	5–2	Bradford City	Fulham
15:15 GMT	Thain (x2); Pearson 52'; Priestley 56', 86'	Report	Batten 22'; Moore 28'	Stadium: Stamford Bridge; Attendance: 25,835; Referee: Edwin Small

12 February 1927 26	Fulham	1–2	Chelsea	Fulham
15:15 GMT	Pape 33'	Report	Wilson 46'; Turnbull 80'	Stadium: Craven Cottage; Attendance: 31,501; Referee: J.C. O'Neill

26 February 1927 27	Chelsea	4–1	South Shields	Fulham
15:30 GMT	Turnbull 47', 88'; Thain (x2)	Report	Smith 60'	Stadium: Stamford Bridge; Attendance: 31,191; Referee: Albert Fogg

12 March 1927 28	Oldham Athletic	1–2	Chelsea	Oldham
15:15 GMT	Hargreaves 17'	Report	Wilson 14' (pen.); Turnbull 33'	Stadium: Boundary Park; Attendance: 12,298; Referee: Noah Shuker

16 March 1927 29	Chelsea	2–0	Port Vale	Fulham
15:30 GMT	Thain 47'; Wilson 70'	Report		Stadium: Stamford Bridge; Attendance: 18,169; Referee: Tommy Crew

19 March 1927 30	Chelsea	2–0	Grimsby Town	Fulham
15:30 GMT	Turnbull 3', 90'	Report		Stadium: Stamford Bridge; Attendance: 35,239; Referee: George Watson

21 March 1927 31	Preston North End	0–2	Chelsea	Preston
15:00 GMT		Report	Ferguson 26'; Wilding 40'	Stadium: Deepdale; Attendance: 14,995; Referee: Archie Caseley

26 March 1927 32	Blackpool	3–1	Chelsea	Blackpool
15:15 GMT	Neal 49'; Tremelling 55', 84'	Report	Thain 70'	Stadium: Bloomfield Road; Attendance: 8,251; Referee: Archie Caseley

2 April 1927 33	Chelsea	0–0	Reading	Fulham
15:30 GMT		Report		Stadium: Stamford Bridge; Attendance: 35,424; Referee: Harry Sykes

4 April 1927 34	Southampton	1–1	Chelsea	Southampton
17:00 GMT	Rowley 4'	Report	Turnbull 55'	Stadium: The Dell; Attendance: 5,368; Referee: H.P. Hinderer

9 April 1927 35	Swansea Town	2–1	Chelsea	Swansea
15:15 GMT	Fowler 10'; Thompson 46'	Report	Crawford 30'	Stadium: Vetch Field; Attendance: 10,435; Referee: Edwin Small

16 April 1927 36	Chelsea	2–0	Nottingham Forest	Fulham
15:30 GMT	Turnbull 35', 43'	Report		Stadium: Stamford Bridge; Attendance: 44,855; Referee: Ernie Pinckston

18 April 1927 37	Chelsea	1–0	Wolverhampton Wanderers	Fulham
15:30 GMT	Ferguson 20'	Report		Stadium: Stamford Bridge; Attendance: 28,945; Referee: Albert Fogg

23 April 1927 38	Barnsley	3–0	Chelsea	Barnsley
15:15 GMT	Brook 7'; Curran 34'; Fletcher 78'	Report		Stadium: Oakwell; Attendance: 9,641; Referee: Harry Sykes

28 April 1927 39	Clapton Orient	3–0	Chelsea	Clapton
18:30 GMT	Dennison 6'; Cock 52'; Corkindale 80'	Report		Stadium: Millfields Road; Attendance: 25,329; Referee: William Thomas

30 April 1927 40	Chelsea	0–0	Manchester City	Fulham
15:15 GMT		Report		Stadium: Stamford Bridge; Attendance: 39,995; Referee: R.O. Rees

4 May 1927 41	Chelsea	0–0	Portsmouth	Fulham
18:00 GMT		Report		Stadium: Stamford Bridge; Attendance: 40,037; Referee: C.F. Moon

7 May 1927 42	Darlington	2–2	Chelsea	Darlington
15:00 GMT	Ruddy 3'; Crockford 75'	Report	Crawford 42'; Ferguson 90'	Stadium: Feethams; Attendance: 12,937; Referee: Francis Couldrey

=== FA Cup ===
Win Draw Loss Fixtures

8 January 1927 Third round	Chelsea	4–0	Luton Town	Fulham
14:30 GMT	Turnbull 34', 40'; Thain 44', 90'	Report		Stadium: Stamford Bridge; Attendance: 41,441; Referee: E.G. Goddard

29 January 1927 Fourth round	Chelsea	7–2	Accrington Stanley	Fulham
14:45 GMT	Thain (x2); Wilson 7', 10'; Turnbull (x3)	Report	Powell 27'; Wyper 32'	Stadium: Stamford Bridge; Attendance: 30,142; Referee: Ernie Pinckston

19 February 1927 Fifth round	Chelsea	2–1	Burnley	Fulham
15:00 GMT	Thain 38'; Wilding 49'	Report	Cross 60'	Stadium: Stamford Bridge; Attendance: 63,238; Referee: Tom Bryan

5 March 1927 Sixth round	Chelsea	0–0	Cardiff City	Fulham
15:00 GMT		Report		Stadium: Stamford Bridge; Attendance: 70,184; Referee: J.V. Pennington

9 March 1927 Sixth round replay	Cardiff City	3–2	Chelsea	Cardiff
15:00 GMT	Irving 10'; Davies 20'; Ferguson 70' (pen.)	Report	Priestley 43'; Turnbull 49'	Stadium: Ninian Park; Attendance: 47,353; Referee: J.V. Pennington
