= 1934–35 Queens Park Rangers F.C. season =

English football club season

Queens Park Rangers
1934–35 season
- Chairman: Charles W Fielding
- Manager: Mick O'Brien (until 9 April), Billy Birrell (15 April 1935)
- Stadium: Loftus Road
- Football League Third Division South: 13th
- Football League Third Division South Cup.: Round 3
- F A Cup: Round 2
- Top goalscorer: League: Jack Blackman 19; All: Jack Blackman 21
- Highest home attendance: 14,000 (8 December 1934) Vs Brighton and Hove Albion
- Lowest home attendance: 2,834 (16 February 1935) Vs Bristol Rovers
- Average home league attendance: 7,705
- Biggest win: 5–1 Vs Torquay United (19 April 1935)
- Biggest defeat: 0–7 Vs Torquay United (22 April 1935)
Home colours	Away colours

The 1934–35 Queens Park Rangers season was the club's 44th season of existence and their 15th season in the Football League Third Division. QPR finished 13th in the league, and were eliminated in the second round of the FA Cup.

== League standings ==
Pos	Team	Pld	W	D	L	GF	GA	GAv	Pts
11	Exeter City	42	16	9	17	70	75	0.933	41
12	Millwall	42	17	7	18	57	62	0.919	41
13	Queens Park Rangers	42	16	9	17	63	72	0.875	41
14	Clapton Orient	42	15	10	17	65	65	1.000	40
15	Bristol City	42	15	9	18	52	68	0.765	39

=== Results ===
QPR scores given first

Win Draw Loss

=== Third Division South ===
Date	Opponent	Venue	Result	Score F–A	Scorers	Attendance	Position
25 August 1934	Swindon Town	A	L	1–3	Reed	12,176	16
29 August 1934	Crystal Palace	H	D	3–3	Blackman, Blake, Crawford	9,415	16
1 September 1934	Aldershot	H	W	2–0	Reed 2	12,040	11
5 September 1934	Crystal Palace	A	W	3–2	Hammond. Blackman, Reed	15,843	6
8 September 1934	Cardiff City	A	L	1–2	OG	12,663	11
15 September 1934	Brighton and Hove Albion	H	W	2–1	Blackman, Abel	9,410	10
22 September 1934	Luton Town	A	D	1–1	Crawford	7,233	10
29 September 1934	Southend United	H	D	1–1	Abel	9,989	10
6 October 1934	Bristol Rovers	A	L	0–2		7,835	11
13 October 1934	Charlton Athletic	H	L	0–3		12,554	15
20 October 1934	Gillingham	A	D	0–0		5,898	14
27 October 1934	Reading	H	W	2–0	Dutton, Watson	8,433	12
3 November 1934	Millwall	A	L	0–2		12,001	16
10 November 1934	Coventry City	H	D	1–1	Crawford	7,442	16
17 November 1934	Watford	A	L	0–2		8,066	17
1 December 1934	Exeter City	A	L	0–3		4,359	17
8 December 1934	Bristol City	h		PP			
15 December 1934	Northampton Town	A	L	0–1		5,008	19
22 December 1934	Bournemouth and Boscombe Athletic	H	W	2–1	Blackman, Crawford	4,300	18
25 December 1934	Leyton Orient	H	W	6–3	Blackman 2, Emmerson, Devine, Crawford, Allen	9,244	17
26 December 1934	Leyton Orient	A	L	1–3	Crawford	11,446	18
29 December 1934	Swindon Town	H	D	1–1	Blake	6,150	18
1 January 1935	Bristol City	H	W	4–1	Blackman, Emmerson, Crawford, Allen	7,797	14
5 January 1935	Aldershot	A	L	0–1		3,625	17
12 January 1935	Newport County	H	W	4–1	Dutton, Blackman 2, Emmerson	4,511	12
19 January 1935	Cardiff City	H	D	2–2	Blackman, Dutton	5,548	13
26 January 1935	Brighton and Hove Albion	A	L	1–5	Allen	5,098	14
2 February 1935	Luton Town	H	W	3–0	Blackman 2, Crawford	6,201	12
9 February 1935	Southend United	A	L	0–2		5,681	13
16 February 1935	Bristol Rovers	H	W	2–0	Abel, Dutton	2,834	12
23 February 1935	Charlton Athletic	A	L	1–3	Allen	17,897	12
2 March 1935	Gillingham	H	W	2–0	Blackman, Farmer	8,157	10
9 March 1935	Reading	A	D	0–0		6,631	11
16 March 1935	Millwall	H	W	1–0	Farmer	8,279	10
23 March 1935	Coventry City	A	L	1–4	Blackman	8,096	13
30 March 1935	Watford	H	W	2–1	Blackman, Blake	6,732	11
6 April 1935	Newport County	A	L	1–2	Blackman	2,912	12
13 April 1935	Exeter City	H	D	1–1	Farmer	5,500	12
19 April 1935	Torquay United	H	W	5–1	Blackman 2, Blake, Dutton, Farmer	6,082	11
20 April 1935	Bristol City	A	L	1–5	OG	5,888	13
22 April 1935	Torquay United	A	L	0–7		3,445	13
27 April 1935	Northampton Town	H	W	3–2	Blackman, Farmer 2	3,603	12
4 May 1935	Bournemouth and Boscombe Athletic	A	W	2–0	Farmer, Dutton	4,970	13

=== F A Cup ===
Round	Date	Opponent	Venue	Result	Score F–A	Scorers	Attendance
1	24 November 1934	Walthamstow Avenue (Athenian League )	H	W	2–0	Emmerson, Devine	9,000
2	8 December 1934	Brighton and Hove Albion (Division 3 South)	H	L	1–2	Crawford	14,000

=== London Challenge Cup ===
Round	Date	Opponent	Venue	Result	Score F–A	Scorers	Attendance
1	8 October 1934	Millwall	A	L	0–2		

=== Division 3 South Cup ===
Round	Date	Opponent	Venue	Result	Score F–A	Scorers	Attendance
2	18 October 1934	Luton Town	H	W	2–1	Blackman, Crawford	
3	13 February 1935	Watford	A	D	1–1	Blackman	3,000
3 Replay	28 February 1935	Watford	H	D	1–1	Blake	
3 2nd Replay	14 March 1935	Watford	H	L	0–2*aet		

=== Friendlies ===
11 August 1934	Reds v Hoops (H)	H	
18 August 1934	Reds v Hoops (H)	H	
12 September 1934	Sutton United	A	Friendly
23 January 1935	Dutch XI	a	Friendly

== Squad ==
Position	Nationality	Name	Div 3 South Appearances	Div 3 South Goals	F A Cup Appearances	F A Cup Goals	Div 3 South Cup Appearances	Div 3 South Cup Goals	Total Appearances	Total Goals
GK	(England)	Bill Mason	32		2		4		38	
GK	(England)	Ernie Beecham	10						10	
DF	(England)	John Ridley	17		1		3		32	
DF	(England)	Don Ashman	21		1		3			
DF	(England)	Jimmy Allan	25	4	1		3		29	4
DF	(England)	Sidney Russell	21		1		1		23	
DF		Walter Barrie	25		2		1		28	
DF	(England)	Fred Bartlett	3		1				4	
DF	(England)	Ted Goodier	40		1		3		44	
DF		William Trodd	6				1		7	
MF	(Scotland)	Alec Farmer	26	7	1		4		31	7
MF		Joe Hammond	8	1	1				9	1
MF	(England)	Dicky March	24				4		28	
MF		Albert Blake	37	4	1		2	1	40	5
MF	(England)	Walter Langford	2		1				3	
MF	(England)	Jackie Crawford	26	8	2	1	3	1	31	10
MF	(England)	George Emmerson	15	3	1	1	1		17	4
FW	(England)	Samuel Abel	20	3	1		3		24	3
FW	(England)	Jack Blackman	38	19	1		4	2	43	21
FW	(England)	Gordon Reed	9	4					9	4
FW		Robert Connor	5				1		6	
FW	(Scotland)	Joe Devine	20	1	2	1	1		23	2
FW	(England)	Tommy Dutton	23	6	1		2		26	6
FW		George Watson	8	1					8	1
FW	(England)	Ernie Wright	1						1	

== Transfers in ==
Name	from	Date	Fee
Samuel Abel	Reading	1934	
John Ridley		1934	
Fred Bartlett		1934	
William Trodd		1934	
Jackie Crawford		1934	
Gordon Reed	Newport County	1934	
Ernie Wright	Sedgeley Park	1934	
Wright, Ernie	Sedgley Park	29 August 1934	
Hull, William *		1 October 1934	
Robert Connor	Crawcrook Albion	10 October 1934	
Rhodes, Harold *	Darwen	2 November 1934	
Miles, Alfie	Yeovil & Petters U	22 February 1935	
Cheetham, Tommy *	Royal Artillery	2 March 1935	
Allan, Jimmy *	Huddersfield	30 April 1935	
Jack Fletcher	Bournemouth	6 June 1935	
Harry Lowe	Watford	19 June 1935	Ted Goodier
Ernie Vincent	Manchester United	15 June 1935	
Davie Ovenstone	Raith Rovers	22 June 1935	Free

== Transfers out ==
Name	from	Date	Fee	Date	Club	Fee
George Clarke	Crystal Palace	July1933		cs 34	Folkestone	
Field, Bill *	Hereford U	4 October 1933		cs 34	Slough Town	
Rivers, Walter	Crystal P	22 May 1933		Aug 34	Gateshead	
Brown, Dick	Blyth Spartans	2 July 1932		Aug 34	Northampton	
Gofton, George	Newcastle	13 May 1932		Nov 34	Wallsend	
John Ridley	Reading	1934		1935	North Shields	
William Trodd		1934		1935		
Robert Connor	Crawcrook Albion	10 October 1934		1935	Yeovil & Petters U	
Joe Devine	Sunderland	1933		1935	Birmingham	
Devine, Joe	Sunderland	25 May 1933	£2,500	Jan 35	Birmingham	£2,000
McCarthy, Terry	Hanwell Town	9 September 1933		May 35	Swindon	
Ted Goodier	Oldham Athletic	13 November 1931	£750	June 35	Watford	Harry Lowe £1,250
George Emmerson	Cardiff City	12 June 1933	Ted Marcroft	June 35	Rochdale	
Gordon Reed	Newport County	26 May 1934		June 35	Darlington	
Wright, Ernie	Sedgley Park	29 August 1934		June 35	Crewe	
Tommy Dutton	Leicester City	11 May 1934		June 35	Doncaster Rovers	
