= Joseph Evans =

Joseph or Joe Evans may refer to:

- Joseph P. Evans (1835–1889), American politician in Virginia
- Joseph Evans (Australian politician) (1837–1904), English-born Australian politician
- Joseph Edward Evans (1855–1938), British schoolmaster and amateur astronomer
- Joe Evans (baseball) (1895–1951), American baseball player
- Joseph Evans (footballer) (1906–1971), English footballer
- Joe Evans (saxophonist) (1916–2014), American jazz alto saxophonist
- Joe Evans (footballer) (1920–2013), Australian rules footballer
- Joseph Evans (war correspondent), American war correspondent in World War II; see New York Herald Tribune
- Joseph Evans (tenor) (born 1945), American tenor and music educator
- Sev Statik (Joseph T. Evans, born 1971), American hip hop musician
- Joe Evans (American football) (born 1999), American football player
