= 1917–18 Manchester City F.C. season =

English football club season

Manchester City F.C.
1917–18 season
- Manager: Ernest Mangnall
- War League Principal Tournament Lancashire Section: 4th
- Subsidiary Tournament Lancashire Section Group B: 1st
- Top goalscorer: League: Lomas (22 goals); All: Lomas (22 goals)
- Highest home attendance: 20,000 vs Manchester United (29 September 1917); 20,000 vs Stoke (3 November 1917)
- Lowest home attendance: 8,000 vs Burnley (15 December 1917)

The 1917–18 season was Manchester City F.C.'s twenty-seventh season of league football.

Owing to the War, once again Manchester City played non-competitive war league football. In the principal tournament they contested the Lancashire Section, while in the four-team subsidiary tournament they contested the Group B of the Lancashire Section.

== War Leagues ==
=== Principal Tournament ===
==== Lancashire Section ====
| Pos | Team | Pld | W | D | L | GF | GA | GR | Pts |
|---|---|---|---|---|---|---|---|---|---|
| 2 | Liverpool | 30 | 21 | 6 | 3 | 101 | 26 | 3.885 | 48 |
| 3 | Everton | 30 | 19 | 6 | 5 | 92 | 36 | 2.556 | 44 |
| 4 | Manchester City | 30 | 15 | 8 | 7 | 57 | 28 | 2.036 | 38 |
| 5 | Stockport County | 30 | 17 | 3 | 10 | 59 | 32 | 1.844 | 37 |
| 6 | Rochdale | 30 | 14 | 9 | 7 | 78 | 51 | 1.529 | 37 |

Source: rsssf.com

===== Results summary =====
| Overall | | | | | | | | Home | | | | | | Away | | | | | |
| Pld | W | D | L | GF | GA | GD | Pts | W | D | L | GF | GA | GD | W | D | L | GF | GA | GD |
|---|---|---|---|---|---|---|---|---|---|---|---|---|---|---|---|---|---|---|---|
| 30 | 15 | 8 | 7 | 57 | 28 | +29 | 38 | 8 | 4 | 3 | 31 | 16 | +15 | 7 | 4 | 4 | 26 | 12 | +14 |

N.B. Points awarded for a win: 2

===== Reports =====
| Date | Opponents | H / A | Venue | Result F – A | Scorers | Attendance |
|---|---|---|---|---|---|---|
| 1 September 1917 | Stockport County | H | Hyde Road | 2 – 1 | Tyler, Thorpe | 12,000 |
| 8 September 1917 | Stockport County | A | Edgeley Park | 1 – 0 | ? (o.g.) | 7,000 |
| 15 September 1917 | Oldham Athletic | H | Hyde Road | 2 – 2 | Thorpe, Moses | 13,000 |
| 22 September 1917 | Oldham Athletic | A | Boundary Park | 0 – 0 | | 10,000 |
| 29 September 1917 | Manchester United | H | Hyde Road | 3 – 1 | Lomas (2), Jones | 20,000 |
| 6 October 1917 | Manchester United | A | Old Trafford | 1 – 1 | Lomas | 10,000 |
| 13 October 1917 | Bury | H | Hyde Road | 3 – 1 | Lomas (2), Watson | 9,000 |
| 20 October 1917 | Bury | A | Gigg Lane | 5 – 2 | Lomas (2), Meredith, Jones, Taylor | 8,000 |
| 27 October 1917 | Stoke | A | Victoria Ground | 3 – 4 | Lomas (2), Watson | 9,000 |
| 3 November 1917 | Stoke | H | Hyde Road | 1 – 0 | Lomas | 20,000 |
| 10 November 1917 | Liverpool | A | Anfield | 0 – 2 | | 18,000 |
| 17 November 1917 | Liverpool | H | Hyde Road | 1 – 1 | Thompson | 15,000 |
| 24 November 1917 | Southport Central | A | Unknown stadium | 0 – 0 | | 8,000 |
| 1 December 1917 | Southport Central | H | Hyde Road | 5 – 0 | Lomas (2), Tyler, Meredith, Wynn | 10,000 |
| 8 December 1917 | Burnley | A | Turf Moor | 4 – 0 | Lomas (3), Jones | 1,000 |
| 15 December 1917 | Burnley | H | Hyde Road | 4 – 1 | Tyler, Lomas, Jones, Watson | 8,000 |
| 22 December 1917 | Blackburn Rovers | H | Hyde Road | 1 – 0 | Cartwright | 12,000 |
| 29 December 1917 | Blackburn Rovers | A | Ewood Park | 4 – 0 | Meredith, Lomas, Cope, Cunningham | 3,000 |
| 5 January 1918 | Rochdale | H | Hyde Road | 1 – 1 | Tyler | 9,000 |
| 12 January 1918 | Rochdale | A | Spotland | 4 – 1 | Thompson (2), Barnes, Watson | 6,000 |
| 19 January 1918 | Everton | H | Hyde Road | 0 – 2 | | 13,000 |
| 26 January 1918 | Everton | A | Goodison Park | 0 – 0 | | 20,000 |
| 2 February 1918 | Port Vale | H | Hyde Road | 5 – 1 | Broad (2), Lomas (2), Thompson | 11,000 |
| 9 February 1918 | Port Vale | A | Recreation Ground | 2 – 0 | Lomas, Cunningham | 1,000 |
| 16 February 1918 | Bolton Wanderers | A | Burnden Park | 0 – 1 | | 12,000 |
| 23 February 1918 | Bolton Wanderers | H | Hyde Road | 0 – 1 | | 10,000 |
| 2 March 1918 | Preston North End | A | Deepdale | 2 – 0 | Lomas, Thompson | 9,000 |
| 9 March 1918 | Preston North End | H | Hyde Road | 1 – 2 | Lomas | 10,000 |
| 16 March 1918 | Blackpool | A | Bloomfield Road | 0 – 1 | | 9,000 |
| 23 March 1918 | Blackpool | H | Hyde Road | 2 – 2 | Royle, Thompson | 11,000 |

=== Subsidiary Tournament ===
==== Lancashire Section, Group B ====
| Pos | Team | Pld | W | D | L | GF | GA | GR | Pts |
|---|---|---|---|---|---|---|---|---|---|
| 1 | Manchester City | 6 | 4 | 1 | 1 | 11 | 4 | 2.750 | 9 |
| 2 | Manchester United | 6 | 3 | 1 | 2 | 6 | 7 | 0.857 | 7 |
| 3 | Port Vale | 6 | 2 | 2 | 2 | 10 | 5 | 2.000 | 6 |
| 4 | Stoke | 6 | 1 | 0 | 5 | 4 | 15 | 0.267 | 2 |

Source: rsssf.com

===== Results summary =====
| Overall | | | | | | | | Home | | | | | | Away | | | | | |
| Pld | W | D | L | GF | GA | GD | Pts | W | D | L | GF | GA | GD | W | D | L | GF | GA | GD |
|---|---|---|---|---|---|---|---|---|---|---|---|---|---|---|---|---|---|---|---|
| 6 | 4 | 1 | 1 | 11 | 4 | +7 | 9 | 3 | 0 | 0 | 6 | 0 | +6 | 1 | 1 | 1 | 5 | 4 | +1 |

N.B. Points awarded for a win: 2

===== Reports =====
| Date | Opponents | H / A | Venue | Result F – A | Scorers | Attendance |
|---|---|---|---|---|---|---|
| 29 March 1918 | Manchester United | H | Hyde Road | 3 – 0 | Fletcher, Royle, Mann | 10,000 |
| 30 March 1918 | Port Vale | A | Recreation Ground | 4 – 1 | Royle (2), Thompson, P. Fairclough | 8,000 |
| 1 April 1918 | Manchester United | A | Old Trafford | 0 – 2 | | 10,000 |
| 6 April 1918 | Port Vale | H | Hyde Road | 1 – 0 | Fletcher | 10,000 |
| 13 April 1918 | Stoke | A | Victoria Ground | 1 – 1 | Fletcher | 9,000 |
| 20 April 1918 | Stoke | H | Hyde Road | 2 – 0 | Woodcock, ? (o.g.) | 11,000 |

== Squad statistics ==
=== Squad ===
Appearances for competitive matches only

| Pos. | Name | Principal | | Subsidiary | | Total | |
| Pos. | Name | Apps | Goals | Apps | Goals | Apps | Goals |
|---|---|---|---|---|---|---|---|
| GK | (England) Jim Goodchild | 25 | 0 | 4 | 0 | 29 | 0 |
| GK | Percy Kite | 1 | 0 | 0 | 0 | 1 | 0 |
| GK | (England) Walter Smith | 4 | 0 | 2 | 0 | 6 | 0 |
| DF | (England) Eli Fletcher | 29 | 0 | 6 | 0 | 35 | 0 |
| DF | (England) Fred Parker | 16 | 0 | 2 | 0 | 18 | 0 |
| MF | (England) Sid Hoad | 3 | 1 | 3 | 0 | 0 | 1 |
| FW | (England) Horace Barnes | 18 | 16 | 0 | 0 | 18 | 16 |
| FW | (England) Ted Hanney | 1 | 0 | 0 | 0 | 1 | 0 |
| FW | (England) Gordon Hoare | 1 | 1 | 0 | 0 | 1 | 1 |
| FW | (Wales) Lot Jones | 8 | 0 | 1 | 0 | 9 | 0 |
| FW | (England) Billy Lomas | 0 | 0 | 5 | 0 | 5 | 0 |
| FW | (Wales) Billy Meredith | 27 | 2 | 6 | 0 | 33 | 2 |
| FW | (England) Harry Taylor | 1 | 0 | 0 | 0 | 1 | 0 |
| FW | (England) Harold Walden | 2 | 1 | 0 | 0 | 2 | 1 |
| FW | (Wales) George Wynn | 18 | 3 | 2 | 1 | 20 | 4 |
| -- | Armstrong | 0 | 0 | 4 | 0 | 4 | 0 |
| -- | Bill Bottomley | 23 | 0 | 1 | 0 | 24 | 0 |
| -- | Jack Brennan | 12 | 2 | 1 | 0 | 13 | 2 |
| -- | T. Broad | 2 | 0 | 0 | 0 | 2 | 0 |
| -- | Alf Capper | 1 | 5 | 0 | 0 | 1 | 5 |
| -- | Joe Cartwright | 23 | 2 | 4 | 0 | 27 | 2 |
| -- | J. Clegg | 0 | 0 | 2 | 0 | 2 | 0 |
| -- | Cruse | 1 | 0 | 0 | 0 | 1 | 0 |
| -- | Alfred Davies | 18 | 1 | 0 | 0 | 18 | 1 |
| -- | Peter Fairclough | 20 | 4 | 4 | 0 | 24 | 4 |
| DF | (England) Peter Gartland | 19 | 0 | 2 | 0 | 21 | 0 |
| -- | Robert Geddes | 1 | 0 | 0 | 0 | 1 | 0 |
| -- | Goddard | 3 | 3 | 0 | 0 | 3 | 3 |
| -- | R. Hargreaves | 0 | 0 | 1 | 0 | 1 | 0 |
| -- | M. Lee | 0 | 0 | 1 | 0 | 1 | 0 |
| -- | F. McIlvenney | 0 | 0 | 2 | 1 | 2 | 1 |
| -- | Malone | 0 | 0 | 1 | 0 | 1 | 0 |
| -- | Miller | 4 | 0 | 0 | 0 | 4 | 0 |
| -- | Nelson | 6 | 2 | 0 | 0 | 6 | 2 |
| -- | H. Newton | 0 | 0 | 4 | 1 | 4 | 1 |
| -- | William Newton | 5 | 1 | 2 | 0 | 7 | 1 |
| -- | Sid Scott | 8 | 0 | 1 | 0 | 9 | 0 |
| -- | Skeldon | 1 | 0 | 0 | 0 | 1 | 0 |
| -- | J.D. Tavo | 2 | 1 | 0 | 0 | 2 | 1 |
| -- | Herbert Tyler | 22 | 3 | 6 | 0 | 28 | 3 |
| -- | Woodhouse | 0 | 0 | 1 | 0 | 1 | 0 |
| -- | Jimmy Wray | 5 | 1 | 1 | 0 | 6 | 1 |

=== Scorers ===
==== All ====
| Scorer | Goals |
|---|---|
| (England) Billy Lomas | 22 |
| (England) Jimmy Thompson | 7 |
| (Wales) Lot Jones | 4 |
| Stanley Royle | 4 |
| Herbert Tyler | 4 |
| Watson | 4 |
| (England) Eli Fletcher | 3 |
| (Wales) Billy Meredith | 3 |
| (England) Tommy Broad | 2 |
| Charlie Cunningham | 2 |
| Thorpe | 2 |
| (England) Horace Barnes | 1 |
| Joe Cartwright | 1 |
| Cope | 1 |
| Peter Fairclough | 1 |
| (England) Frank Mann | 1 |
| Moses | 1 |
| (England) Harry Taylor | 1 |
| (England) Wilf Woodcock | 1 |
| (Wales) George Wynn | 1 |

==== Principal Tournament ====
| Scorer | Goals |
|---|---|
| (England) Billy Lomas | 22 |
| (England) Jimmy Thompson | 6 |
| (Wales) Lot Jones | 4 |
| Herbert Tyler | 4 |
| Watson | 4 |
| (Wales) Billy Meredith | 3 |
| (England) Tommy Broad | 2 |
| Charlie Cunningham | 2 |
| Thorpe | 2 |
| (England) Horace Barnes | 1 |
| Joe Cartwright | 1 |
| Cope | 1 |
| Moses | 1 |
| Stanley Royle | 1 |
| (England) Harry Taylor | 1 |
| (Wales) George Wynn | 1 |

==== Subsidiary Tournament ====
| Scorer | Goals |
|---|---|
| (England) Eli Fletcher | 3 |
| Stanley Royle | 3 |
| Peter Fairclough | 1 |
| (England) Frank Mann | 1 |
| (England) Jimmy Thompson | 1 |
| (England) Wilf Woodcock | 1 |

== See also ==
- Manchester City F.C. seasons
