= Proudfoot =

Proudfoot is a surname, and may refer to:

- Bill Proudfoot (1868–1931), Australian rules footballer
- Ben Proudfoot, Canadian filmmaker
- David Proudfoot (trade unionist) (1892–1958), Scottish trades unionist and communist
- James Proudfoot (1908–1971), Scottish-born British portrait and landscape painter.
- Jim Proudfoot (born 1972), English football commentator
- Jim Proudfoot (journalist) (1933–2001), Canadian sports journalist
- Jimmy Proudfoot (1906–1963), English footballer
- John Proudfoot (disambiguation), multiple people
- Kimo Proudfoot, American director of music videos
- Peter Proudfoot (1879–1941), a Scottish footballer
- Tony Proudfoot (1949–2010), Canadian football defensive back
- Wilfred Proudfoot (1921–2013), British Conservative Party politician and businessman
- Willis T. Proudfoot (1860–1928), also known as William T. Proudfoot, American architect
- William Proudfoot (1859–1922), Ontario politician and barrister

== See also ==
- Proudfoot Supermarkets in the Scarborough, North Yorkshire district.
