= Peter McKenna =

Peter McKenna may refer to:

- Peter McKenna (Australian footballer) (born 1946), Australian rules footballer
- Peter McKenna (English footballer) (1901–1964), English football goalkeeper
- Peter McKenna (rugby union) (born 1974), Irish rugby player
- Peter McKenna (writer), creator of Irish TV series Kin
