= Reginald Weaver (disambiguation) =

Reginald Weaver (1876–1945) was an Australian politician. It is also the name of:

- Reginald Weaver (footballer) (1905–1970), English footballer
- Reg Weaver (1939–2026), American labor leader
