= William Lomas =

William Lomas may refer to:

- Billy Lomas (1885-1976), English footballer
- Bill Lomas (1928-2007), English Grand Prix motorcycle road racer
