= John Meredith =

John or Jack Meredith may refer to:

- John A. Meredith (1814–1882), American politician and judge from Virginia
- John Meredith (rugby union) (1863–1920), Welsh international rugby union player
- John Meredith (general) (1864–1942), Australian Army brigadier-general in World War I
- John Nelson Meredith (1892–1971), British architect
- John Meredith (baseball), American baseball player
- Jack Meredith (footballer) (1899–1970), English footballer
- John Meredith (folklorist) (1920–2001), Australian folklorist
- John Meredith (artist) (1933–2000), Canadian painter
- John Meredith (footballer) (1940–2026), English professional footballer

== See also ==
- John Meredith Temple (1910–1994), British Conservative MP
- Jack Meredith (disambiguation)
