= Jack Meredith =

Jack Meredith may refer to:

- Jack Meredith (footballer) (1899–1970), British footballer
- Jack Meredith (athlete) (born 1992), British hurdler
- Jack R. Meredith (born 1939), American engineer and management consultant

== See also ==
- John Meredith (disambiguation)
