= Frederick Bartlett =

Frederic(k) Bartlett may refer to:

- Frederic Bartlett (1886–1969), British psychologist
- Frederic Clay Bartlett (1873–1953), American artist, associated with the Second Presbyterian Church (Chicago, Illinois)
- Frederick B. Bartlett (1882–1941), American bishop of Idaho
- Fred Bartlett (1913–1968), English footballer

== See also ==
- Frederick Bartlett Fancher (1852–1944), American politician
