= Jimmy Wilson (footballer, born 1924) =

English footballer

Personal information
- Full name: James Thompson Wilson
- Date of birth: 15 March 1924
- Place of birth: Middlesbrough, England
- Date of death: 16 January 1987 (aged 62)
- Place of death: Fulham, London, England
- Positions: Forward; wing half

Senior career*
Years	Team	Apps	(Gls)
1941–194x	Fulham	0	(0)
194x–1947	Gravesend & Northfleet		
1947–1950	Chelsea	0	(0)
1950	Leeds United	0	(0)
1950–1957	Watford	49	(12)
1957–1958	Southend United	0	(0)
- * Club domestic league appearances and goals

James Thompson Wilson (15 March 1924 – 16 January 1987), also known as Tug Wilson, was an English footballer. He was capable of playing as either a half back or a forward.

His father, Andy Wilson, played for Middlesbrough and Chelsea in the 1920s and 1930s, and was a Scottish international.

Although born in Middlesbrough, Wilson started his career in London, as an amateur at Fulham. He later played for Gravesend & Northfleet, Chelsea and Leeds United, before joining Watford in December 1950. Although largely a reserve at Vicarage Road, Wilson amassed 51 starts in all competitions over his seven years at the club, before joining Southend United for the 1957–58 season.

He died on 16 January 1987 in London, aged 62.
