= Owen Williams (footballer, born 1896) =

English footballer

Personal information
- Full name: Owen Williams
- Date of birth: 23 September 1896
- Place of birth: Ryhope, England
- Date of death: 9 December 1960 (aged 64)
- Height: 5 ft 8 in (1.73 m)
- Position: Outside left

Youth career
- Ryhope Colliery

Senior career*
Years	Team	Apps	(Gls)
1913–1914	Sunderland	0	(0)
1914	Manchester United	0	(0)
1914–1919	Easington Colliery Welfare		
1919–1924	Clapton Orient	162	(33)
1924–1930	Middlesbrough	184	(40)
1930–1931	Southend United	16	(4)
1931–????	Shildon		

International career
1922–1923	England	2	(0)
- * Club domestic league appearances and goals

Owen Williams (23 September 1896 – 9 December 1960) was an English football player most notable for his career with Clapton Orient and Middlesbrough. He also played twice for the England national football team.

== Playing career ==
Williams was once on the books of Sunderland, but he was allowed to leave the area and so he moved to Manchester United. He failed to settle at that club and so he returned to North East England, where he played non-league football for Easington Colliery Welfare.

At the end of World War I, an interest was shown in him by Clapton Orient, beginning a successful league career. Williams spent five years at Orient, making over 160 appearances. At Orient, he also earned two England international caps, in games against Northern Ireland and Wales. This made him the side's first international footballer and, along with John Townrow, shares the Orient record for most England national team appearances, both with just two.

In February 1924 he signed for Middlesbrough, making his debut three days later against West Bromwich Albion. At the end of that season, Middlesbrough were relegated, but Williams stayed. In Williams' first full season at Boro' he joint top scored with Ian Dickson with seven goals each.

Owen Williams became a member of the famous forward line that won the Second Division championship in 1926–27: Billy Birrell, Billy Pease, George Camsell, Jacky Carr and Williams.

At the end of the 1929–30 season, following another relegation and promotion, he was transfer listed and moved to Southend United for £250 in August.

After just over a year, and only four goals in sixteen appearances, he moved on again, this time to Shildon.
