= John O'Hare (footballer, born 1905) =

Scottish footballer

Personal information
- Date of birth: 26 May 1905
- Place of birth: Armadale, Scotland
- Date of death: 12 August 1970 (aged 65)
- Place of death: Edinburgh, Scotland
- Height: 1.73 m (5 ft 8 in)
- Position: Defender

Senior career*
Years	Team	Apps	(Gls)
- Shawfield
1932–1941	Chelsea	102	(0)
- * Club domestic league appearances and goals

John O'Hare (26 May 1905 – 12 August 1970) was a Scottish footballer who played as a defender.

== Club career ==
O'Hare played as a defender for Chelsea, amassing 102 league appearances.
