= John Proudfoot =

John Proudfoot may refer to:

- John Hugh Proudfoot (1912–1980), Canadian politician
- John Proudfoot (footballer) (1874–1934), Scottish footballer
