= Sydney Bathgate =

Scottish footballer

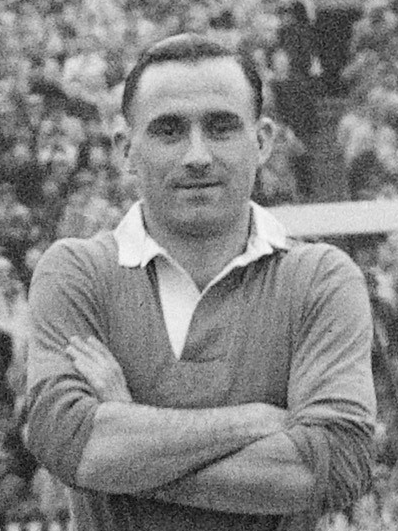

Personal information
- Date of birth: 20 December 1919
- Place of birth: Aberdeen, Scotland
- Date of death: 15 February 1963 (aged 43)
- Place of death: Aberdeen, Scotland
- Height: 1.73 m (5 ft 8 in)
- Position: Full-back

Senior career*
Years	Team	Apps	(Gls)
- Parkvale
1946–1953	Chelsea	135	(0)
1953–1954	Hamilton Academical		
- Keith
- * Club domestic league appearances and goals

Sydney Bathgate (20 December 1919 – 15 February 1963) was a Scottish footballer who played as a full-back.

== Club career ==
Bathgate played as a full-back for Chelsea, amassing 135 league appearances.
