= Johnny Paul =

Scottish footballer

Personal information
- Full name: John Campbell Paul
- Date of birth: 29 January 1899
- Place of birth: Glasgow, Scotland
- Date of death: 20 January 1981
- Place of death: Southville, Bristol, England
- Height: 5 ft 8 in (1.73 m)
- Position: Inside forward

Youth career
- Torpedo Athletic

Senior career*
Years	Team	Apps	(Gls)
1918–1922	Port Glasgow Athletic		
1922–1930	Bristol City	206	(49)
1930–19??	Taunton Town		
- * Club domestic league appearances and goals

Johnny Paul (29 January 1899 – 20 January 1981) was a Scottish footballer who played as an inside forward.

== Career ==
John Campbell "Johnny" Paul played locally for Torpedo Athletic. After four seasons with Port Glasgow Athletic, Alex Raisbeck signed Paul in August 1922 for Bristol City. Paul moved to Taunton Town in November 1930, but a serious knee injury ended his football career soon afterwards. Paul was a leading bowls player and landlord of the "Coopers Arms" in Ashton Gate and the "Angel Inn" in Taunton.

== Honours ==
with Bristol City

- Football League Third Division South winner: 1926–27
