= Cliff Stanton =

English footballer (1895–1979)

Personal information
- Full name: Clifford Stanton
- Date of birth: 12 August 1908
- Place of birth: Stockport, England
- Date of death: 1970 (aged 61–62)
- Position: Centre forward

Senior career*
Years	Team	Apps	(Gls)
1925–1926	Greek Street Baptists (Stockport)		
1926–1927	Altrincham	40	(49)
1927–1929	Oldham Athletic	13	(4)
1929–1930	Macclesfield	35	(23)
1930–1931	Oldham Athletic	5	(1)
Total		83	(77)
- * Club domestic league appearances and goals

Clifford Stanton (2 December 1895 – 1979) was an English footballer who played in the Football League for Oldham Athletic. He was a prolific goalscorer in the Cheshire County League with Altrincham and Macclesfield, scoring 72 goals in two seasons.
