= Joe Evans (footballer) =

Australian rules footballer

Personal information
- Full name: Walter Gerald Evans
- Born: 20 April 1920; West Melbourne, Victoria, Australia
- Died: 17 August 2013 (aged 93)
- Original team: Brunswick City
- Height: 177 cm (5 ft 10 in)
- Weight: 73 kg (161 lb)
- Position: Centre/ Half Forward

Playing career^{1}
Years	Club	Games (Goals)
1940–42	Essendon	21 (1)
- ^{1} Playing statistics correct to the end of 1942.

Walter Gerald "Joe" Evans (20 April 1920 – 17 August 2013) was an Australian rules footballer who played with Essendon in the Victorian Football League (VFL). A half forward from Brunswick City, Joe played 21 games between 1940 and 1942 before his football career was ended by a bad knee injury.
