= Bert Oswald =

Scottish footballer

Personal information
- Full name: Robert Raymond Broome Oswald
- Date of birth: 20 December 1904
- Place of birth: Bo'ness, Scotland
- Date of death: 1961 (aged 56)
- Place of death: Rochford, England
- Height: 5 ft 7 in (1.70 m)
- Position: Forward

Youth career
- Linlithgow Rose

Senior career*
Years	Team	Apps	(Gls)
1924–1926	Heart of Midlothian	1	(0)
1926–1928	Bo'ness		
1928–1930	Reading		
1930–1934	Sheffield United	106	(23)
1934–1938	Southend United		
- * Club domestic league appearances and goals

Robert Raymond Broome "Bert" Oswald (born 20 December 1904, died 1961) was a Scottish footballer who played as a forward.

== Career ==
Born in Bo'ness, Scotland Oswald played as a junior for Linlithgow Rose before being signed by Heart of Midlothian in November 1924. Oswald spent just over a year with Hearts but made only one league appearance before transferring to his home-town team Bo'ness in February 1926, with whom he won the Division Two title in 1927.

In June 1928, Oswald followed manager Angus Wylie to Reading, with the English side paying £400 for his services. Making his Football League debut against Middlesbrough on 25 August 1928, Oswald missed only two games over the next two seasons before being signed by Sheffield United who paid 'Boro £4,000 to take Oswald and Percy Thorpe to Bramall Lane. Oswald was primarily used on the left-wing and played three seasons for United but the club were relegated during the 1933–34 season.

Oswald moved to Southend United in May 1934 for £500 and remained with them until the outbreak of World War II, at which point he retired from playing.
