= Bobby Kerr (footballer, born 1901) =

Scottish footballer (1901–1972)

Personal information
- Full name: Robert Kerr
- Date of birth: 3 August 1901
- Place of birth: Larkhall, Scotland
- Date of death: 1972 (aged 70–71)
- Position: Centre forward

Senior career*
Years	Team	Apps	(Gls)
1919–1920	Netherton Recreation		
1920–1921	Wishaw YMCA		
1921–1922	Third Lanark		
1922–1923	Wishaw YMCA		
1923–1924	Middlesbrough	0	(0)
1924–1925	Heart of Midlothian		
1925–1927	Wolverhampton Wanderers	18	(7)
1927–1929	Clapton Orient	31	(9)
1930	Worcester City		
Total		49	(16)
- * Club domestic league appearances and goals

Robert Kerr (3 August 1901 – 1972) was a Scottish footballer who played in the Football League for Clapton Orient and Wolverhampton Wanderers.
