= Bill Thompson (footballer, born 1899) =

English football defender

Personal information
- Full name: William Potter Thompson
- Date of birth: 1899
- Place of birth: Derby, England
- Date of death: 1959 (aged 59–60)
- Place of death: Derby, England
- Height: 5 ft 9 in (1.75 m)
- Position: Full back

Senior career*
Years	Team	Apps	(Gls)
1922–1935	Nottingham Forest	365	(4)
- * Club domestic league appearances and goals

William Potter Thompson (1899 – October 1959) was an English footballer who played for Nottingham Forest.

Thompson was a full back and made his debut for Nottingham Forest on 26 August 1922 in the First Division match at the City Ground against Sunderland. His last appearance was on 6 April 1935 at home in a 2–2 draw against Manchester United. He captained Forest in the 1920s.

Thompson scored five goals for Nottingham Forest, all of which were penalties.

Thompson also toured South Africa and Netherlands with FA teams.

== Career statistics ==
Club	Season	League			FA Cup		Total	
Club	Season	Division	Apps	Goals	Apps	Goals	Apps	Goals
Nottingham Forest	1922–23	First Division	9	0	0	0	9	0
Nottingham Forest	1923–24	First Division	25	0	1	0	26	0
Nottingham Forest	1923–24	First Division	27	0	2	0	29	0
Nottingham Forest	1925–26	Second Division	37	0	6	0	43	0
Nottingham Forest	1926–27	Second Division	40	0	2	0	42	0
Nottingham Forest	1922–28	Second Division	33	3	5	1	38	4
Nottingham Forest	1928–29	Second Division	42	1	1	0	43	1
Nottingham Forest	1929–30	Second Division	40	0	6	0	46	0
Nottingham Forest	1930–31	Second Division	33	0	1	0	34	0
Nottingham Forest	1931–32	Second Division	22	0	0	0	22	0
Nottingham Forest	1932–33	Second Division	38	0	2	0	40	0
Nottingham Forest	1933–34	Second Division	17	0	0	0	17	0
Nottingham Forest	1934–35	Second Division	2	0	0	0	2	0
Career total			365	4	26	1	391	5
