= Sidney Gibson =

English footballer

Sid Gibson
Personal information
- Full name: Sidney George Gibson
- Date of birth: 20 May 1899
- Place of birth: Walgrave, England
- Date of death: 5 July 1938 (aged 39)
- Place of death: West Ham, England
- Height: 5 ft 8 in (1.73 m)
- Position: Outside right

Senior career*
Years	Team	Apps	(Gls)
- Kettering Town
1921–1928	Nottingham Forest	252	(?)
1928–1932	Sheffield United	106	(22)
Medal record
Nottingham Forest
Winner	Second Division	1922
- * Club domestic league appearances and goals

Sidney George Gibson (20 May 1899 – 5 July 1938) was an English footballer who played as an outside right. Born in Walgrave, Northamptonshire he played for Nottingham Forest and Sheffield United in the Football League before becoming a scout in later life.

== Career ==
=== Playing career ===
Gibson began his playing career with Kettering Town before signing for Nottingham Forest for £500 in October 1921. Making his Football League debut a few days later in an away-fixture at West Ham United, Gibson went on to become a regular in the Forest side for six seasons, making 252 league appearances and winning a Second Division championship medal in the 1921–22 season.

Gibson signed for Sheffield United shortly after the start of the 1928–29 season as a replacement for David Mercer. United paid £5,000 for Gibson, a record fee for both clubs at the time, but he failed to live up to expectations and it appeared he was past his prime. His inconsistency and lack of confidence led to criticism from the club's supporters during games, but despite this Gibson went on to make 118 appearances for the Blades, scoring 29 goals. A serious knee injury sustained in a game against Derby County in January 1932 was quickly followed by further knee problems and Gibson was forced to retire from playing at the age of 33.

=== Post-playing career ===
Gibson received £350 from the Football League as compensation for his retirement and was granted a benefit match against Sheffield Wednesday by United. Having retired from playing Gibson returned to football in January 1935 when he was appointed assistant manager and scout for Southend United. A spell as chief scout at West Ham United followed in 1937, where Gibson was still employed when he died in 1938.

== Personal life ==
Born in Walgrave, Northamptonshire, Gibson was regarded as an accomplished pianist and church organist.
