= Steve Coglin =

English footballer

Personal information
- Full name: Stephen Coglin
- Date of birth: 14 October 1899
- Place of birth: Wolverhampton, England
- Date of death: 1965 (aged 65–66)
- Height: 5 ft 9 in (1.75 m)
- Position: Inside forward

Senior career*
Years	Team	Apps	(Gls)
1919–1920	Moxley White Star		
1920–1921	Darlaston		
1921–1922	Lichfield City		
1922–1923	Wednesbury Old Athletic		
1923–1924	Willenhall		
1924–1927	Sunderland	20	(9)
1927–1931	Grimsby Town	118	(39)
1931–1932	Notts County	13	(3)
1932–1933	Worcester City		
1933–1934	Hereford United		
1934–1935	Cannock Town		
1935–1936	Bromsgrove Rovers		
1936–193?	Archdales		
- * Club domestic league appearances and goals

Stephen Coglin (14 October 1899 – 1965) was an English professional footballer who played as an inside forward.
