= Charlie Wrack =

English footballer

Personal information
- Full name: Charles Wrack
- Date of birth: 28 December 1899
- Place of birth: Boston, England
- Date of death: 13 April 1979 (aged 79)
- Position: Defender

Senior career*
Years	Team	Apps	(Gls)
1922–1923	Boston West End		
1923–1924	Boston Town		
1924–1925	Cleethorpes Town		
1925–1931	Grimsby Town	125	(2)
1931–1932	Hull City	3	(0)
1932–1933	Boston Town		
1933–193?	Louth Town		
- * Club domestic league appearances and goals

Charles Wrack (28 December 1899 – 13 April 1979) was an English professional footballer who played as a defender.
