= Alf Black =

English footballer (1902–1972)

Personal information
- Full name: Alfred George Black
- Date of birth: 15 March 1902
- Place of birth: Milton Regis, England
- Date of death: 1972 (aged 69–70)
- Position: Winger

Senior career*
Years	Team	Apps	(Gls)
1923–1924	Sittingbourne		
1924–1931	Millwall	110	(20)
1931–1932	Luton Town	1	(0)
1932	Folkestone		
Total		111	(20)
- * Club domestic league appearances and goals

Alfred George Black (15 March 1902 – 1972) was an English footballer who played in the Football League for Luton Town and Millwall.
