= Jimmy Proudfoot =

English footballer (1906–1963)

Personal information
- Full name: James Proudfoot
- Date of birth: 31 January 1906
- Place of birth: Usworth Colliery, England
- Date of death: 1963 (aged 56–57)
- Position: Inside forward

Senior career*
Years	Team	Apps	(Gls)
1923–1924	Fatfield Juniors		
1924–1925	Usworth Juniors		
1925–1926	Washington Colliery		
1926–1927	Usworth Colliery		
1927–1932	Barnsley	143	(28)
1932–1933	Notts County	10	(0)
1933	Southend United	10	(1)
1933	Yeovil & Petters United		
1934–1936	Southport	67	(1)
1936	Ashington		
1936	Murton Colliery Welfare		
1937	Blue Bus Company		
Total		230	(30)
- * Club domestic league appearances and goals

James Proudfoot (31 January 1906 – 1963) was an English footballer who played in the Football League for Barnsley, Notts County, Southend United and Southport.
