= Fred Bartlett =

English footballer (1913–1968)

Personal information
- Full name: Frederick Leslie Bartlett
- Date of birth: 5 March 1913
- Place of birth: Reading, England
- Date of death: 1968 (aged 54–55)
- Place of death: Henley-on-Thames, England
- Height: 6 ft 1/2 in (1.84 m)
- Position: Centre half

Senior career*
Years	Team	Apps	(Gls)
–1932	Maidenhead United		
1932–1937	Queens Park Rangers	48	(0)
1932–1933	→ Club Français (loan)	3	(0)
1937–1948	Leyton Orient	96	(0)
1948–1950	Gloucester City	69	
- * Club domestic league appearances and goals

Frederick Leslie Bartlett (5 March 1913 – 1968) was an English professional footballer who played in the Football League for Leyton Orient and Queens Park Rangers as a centre half. He made the most appearances of any player for Leyton Orient during the Second World War, with 215.

== Career statistics ==
Appearances and goals by club, season and competition
Club	Season	League			National cup		Other		Total	
Club	Season	Division	Apps	Goals	Apps	Goals	Apps	Goals	Apps	Goals
Queens Park Rangers	1932–33	Third Division South	0	0	0	0	1 (Note: Appearance in London Challenge Cup)	0	1	0
Queens Park Rangers	1933–34	Third Division South	0	0	0	0	1	0	1	0
Queens Park Rangers	1934–35	Third Division South	3	0	1	0	0	0	4	0
Queens Park Rangers	1935–36	Third Division South	38	0	1	0	1 (Note: Appearance in Third Division South Cup)	0	40	0
Queens Park Rangers	1936–37	Third Division South	7	0	0	0	0	0	7	0
Queens Park Rangers	Total		48	0	2	0	3	0	53	0
Club Français (loan)	1932–33	French Division 1 Group A	3	0	0	0	―		3	0
Career total			51	0	2	0	3	0	56	0
