= Joseph Evans (footballer) =

English footballer (1906–1981)

Personal information
- Full name: Joseph Thomas Evans
- Date of birth: 6 February 1906
- Place of birth: Darlaston, England
- Date of death: 1981 (aged 74–75)
- Position: Wing-half

Senior career*
Years	Team	Apps	(Gls)
1922–1925	Darlaston		
1925–1930	West Bromwich Albion	88	(8)
Total		88	(8)
- * Club domestic league appearances and goals

Joseph Thomas Evans (6 February 1906 – 1981) was an English footballer who played in the Football League for West Bromwich Albion.
