= Billy Lomas =

English footballer (1885–1976)

William Lomas (4 July 1885 – 1976) was an English footballer.

He played for Heywood United, Burnley, Bury, Manchester City, York City, Clapton Orient and Tranmere Rovers.

He was 5 ft 7 1/2 in (1.71 m) tall.
