= John Ridley (footballer, born 1898) =

English footballer

Personal information
- Full name: John George Ridley
- Date of birth: 19 January 1898
- Place of birth: Bardon Mill, England
- Date of death: 1977 (aged 78–79)
- Position: Right-back

Senior career*
Years	Team	Apps	(Gls)
1918–1919	Walker Celtic		
1919–1920	Mickley		
1920–1927	South Shields	182	(4)
1927–1933	Manchester City	175	(0)
1933–1934	Reading	28	(0)
1934–1935	Queens Park Rangers	17	(0)
1935–1938	North Shields		
1938–1939	Mickley		
Total		402	(4)
- * Club domestic league appearances and goals

John George Ridley (19 January 1898 – 1977), also known as Mick Ridley, was a footballer who played as a right full back for South Shields, Manchester City, Reading and Queens Park Rangers in the Football League.

== Career ==
=== Manchester City ===
Ridley joined Manchester City in September 1927, displacing Sam Cookson in the team. He made his debut in a 1–0 victory against South Shields. Ridley made 175 league appearances for Manchester City.
