= James Thompson (footballer) =

English footballer (1898–1984)

Personal information
- Full name: James William Thompson
- Date of birth: 19 April 1898
- Place of birth: Epsom, England
- Date of death: 1984 (aged 85–86)
- Height: 5 ft 11 in (1.80 m)
- Position: Forward

Senior career*
Years	Team	Apps	(Gls)
- Custom House
1921	Charlton Athletic	2	(0)
1921	Wimbledon	5	(7)
1921–1922	Millwall	7	(3)
1923	Coventry City	2	(0)
1924	Clapton Orient	1	(0)
1925–1927	Luton Town	72	(41)
1927–1928	Chelsea	37	(33)
1929	Norwich City	28	(17)
1929	Sunderland	0	(0)
1930	Fulham	4	(2)
1931	Hull City	1	(0)
1931	Tunbridge Wells Rangers		
1932	Tranmere Rovers	0	(0)
- Sittingbourne
- Peterborough United
- Linfield
1936	Aldershot	0	(0)
- FC Luzern
- * Club domestic league appearances and goals

James William Thompson (19 April 1898 – August 1984) was an English professional football player, manager and scout.

== Career ==
Thompson, a forward, began his career as an amateur with Charlton and Wimbledon before playing for Millwall, Coventry City, Clapton Orient, Luton Town, Chelsea, Norwich City, Sunderland, Fulham and Hull City. He then moved into Non-League football with Tunbridge Wells Rangers and Peterborough United, he then signed for Tranmere Rovers, Sittingbourne and Aldershot before retiring. He managed Dartford and later worked as a scout at Chelsea and Southampton and is credited with having discovered Jimmy Greaves.

In his career, he played 150 professional games, scoring 97 goals. 30 of those appearances and 17 of the goals were for Norwich.
