= Willie Russell (footballer, born 1903) =

Scottish footballer

Personal information
- Full name: William Russell
- Date of birth: 22 August 1908
- Place of birth: Hamilton, Scotland
- Date of death: 20 November 1953 (aged 50)
- Place of death: Hawarden, Wales
- Height: 5 ft 7 1/2 in (1.71 m)
- Position: Right half

Youth career
- Larkhall

Senior career*
Years	Team	Apps	(Gls)
1925–1927	Blantyre Victoria		
1927–1935	Chelsea	150	(6)
1935–1937	Heart of Midlothian	17	(0)
1937–1939	Rhyl Athletic (player-manager)		
- * Club domestic league appearances and goals

William Russell (22 August 1908 – 20 November 1953) was a Scottish footballer who played as a right half for Chelsea and Heart of Midlothian.

His son Billy was also a footballer.
