= Harry Wilding =

English footballer

Personal information
- Full name: Harry Thomas Oulton Wilding
- Date of birth: 27 June 1894
- Place of birth: Wolverhampton, England
- Date of death: 12 December 1958 (aged 64)
- Height: 6 ft 0 in (1.83 m)
- Position: Centre half

Senior career*
Years	Team	Apps	(Gls)
- Grenadier Guards
1919–1928	Chelsea	241	(22)
1928	Tottenham Hotspur	12	(1)
	Bristol Rovers	0	(0)
- * Club domestic league appearances and goals

Harry Thomas Oulton Wilding (27 June 1894 – 1958) was an English professional footballer who played for the Grenadier Guards, Chelsea, Tottenham Hotspur and Bristol Rovers.

== Football career ==
Wilding played football while serving with the Grenadier Guards. In 1919 he joined Chelsea where he played in a total of 265 matches and scored on 25 occasions in all competitions. The centre half signed for Tottenham Hotspur in 1928 and featured in 12 matches and scored one goal. After leaving White Hart Lane, Wilding joined Bristol Rovers where he ended his playing career.
