= Sidney Elliott =

English footballer

Personal information
- Date of birth: 14 January 1908
- Place of birth: Sunderland, England
- Date of death: September 1986 (aged 78)
- Position: Forward

Senior career*
Years	Team	Apps	(Gls)
- High Street Wesleyans
- Arcade Mission
- Margate
- Durham City
1927–1928	Fulham	42	(26)
1928–1930	Chelsea	30	(9)
- Bristol City
- Notts County
1934–1935	Bradford City	15	(7)
- Rochdale
- FG Minter Sports
Total		87+	(42+)
- * Club domestic league appearances and goals

Sidney D. Elliott (14 January 1908 – September 1986) was an English professional footballer who played as a forward.

== Career ==
Born in Sunderland, Elliott played for High Street Wesleyans, Arcade Mission, Margate, Durham City, Fulham, Chelsea, Bristol City, Notts County, Bradford City, Rochdale, and FG Minter Sports.

For Fulham he scored 26 goals in 42 league games and also made one FA Cup appearance. For Chelsea, he scored 9 goals in 30 league appearances. For Bradford City, he made 15 appearances in the Football League, scoring 7 goals.

== Sources ==
- Frost, Terry (1988). Bradford City A Complete Record 1903-1988. Breedon Books Sport. ISBN 0-907969-38-0.
