= George Biswell =

English footballer (1904–1981)

Personal information
- Full name: George William Biswell
- Date of birth: 1 September 1904
- Place of birth: Bushey, England
- Date of death: September 1981 (age 77)
- Place of death: Watford, England
- Positions: Inside forward; wing half

Senior career*
Years	Team	Apps	(Gls)
- St Albans City
- Watford
1925–1928	Charlton Athletic	101	(26)
1928–1929	Chelsea	25	(9)
1929–1934	Charlton Athletic		
- * Club domestic league appearances and goals

George William Biswell (1 September 1904 – September 1981) was an English professional footballer. He played for St Albans City and Watford before moving to Charlton Athletic, where he spent the majority of his career. He also played for Chelsea between his two spells with 'The Addicks'.

== Playing career ==
Biswell began his career as an amateur footballer at St Albans City and left after a short time to join Watford, before turning professional with Charlton Athletic. He stayed with the London club until January 1928, when he made the journey across the capital to sign for Chelsea.

=== Chelsea ===
Making his debut for the Blues in a 1–0 win against Clapton Orient, Biswell went on to play a further four games in his first season, scoring on 5 May 1928 when Barnsley overcame the Pensioners 2–1 at Stamford Bridge. The forward started the 1928–29 season brightly, netting two goals in as many games as the Blues beat Swansea Town and Bradford Park Avenue, respectively. Biswell then notched a brace in a 3–0 defeat of Nottingham Forest on 29 September 1928, not scoring again until almost two months later on 24 November 1928, when Chelsea drew 3–3 at home with Port Vale. He finished the season with 8 goals in 19 appearances across all competitions after scoring his final goal - and the winner - for the club against Southampton on 9 March 1929. He only appeared once for Chelsea in the 1929–30 season, in a 1–0 defeat at Cardiff City at the end of the year, before returning to Charlton Athletic.
