= Billy Jackson (footballer) =

English footballer

Personal information
- Full name: William Jackson
- Date of birth: 15 July 1902
- Place of birth: Farnworth, England
- Date of death: 1974 (aged 71–72)
- Place of death: Blackpool, England
- Height: 5 ft 8 in (1.73 m)
- Position: Winger

Senior career*
Years	Team	Apps	(Gls)
- Leyland
1922–1923	Altrincham		
1923–1924	Darwen		
1924–1925	Sunderland	0	(0)
1925–1927	Leeds United	38	(2)
1927–1928	West Ham United	2	(0)
1928–1931	Chelsea	26	(6)
1931	Leicester City	4	(0)
1931–1932	Ashford Town		
1932–1934	Bristol Rovers	37	(14)
1934–1935	Cardiff City	12	(0)
1935	Watford	4	(1)
1935–1936	Chorley		
1936	Netherfield		
- * Club domestic league appearances and goals

William Jackson (15 July 1902 – November 1974) was an English professional footballer who played as a winger.

== Career ==
Jackson started his career with non-league sides Leyland, Altrincham and Darwen before joining Football League club Sunderland. He was unable to break into the first team but eventually made his professional debut for Leeds United the following year. He began the 1925–26 season as first choice before losing his place to Tom Mitchell. After a season as cover, he moved to West Ham United but made only two appearances, both against Sheffield United, before leaving for Chelsea in February 1928.

He spent the longest period of his career with Chelsea, remaining with the club until December 1931, despite being largely used as a reserve player. He left Chelsea to join Leicester City but made just four appearances and was fined by the club after fighting with a reserve team player. He signed for Cardiff City in 1934 but after starting the season in the first team, he was displaced by Freddie Hill. He finished his professional career with a brief spell with Watford before playing non-league football with Chorley and Netherfield.
