= John Priestley (footballer) =

Scottish footballer

Personal information
- Full name: John Priestley
- Date of birth: 19 August 1900
- Place of birth: Johnstone, Scotland
- Date of death: January 1980 (aged 79)
- Place of death: Johnstone, Scotland
- Height: 5 ft 8 in (1.73 m)
- Position: Half back

Senior career*
Years	Team	Apps	(Gls)
1919–1920	Johnstone		
1920–1928	Chelsea	204	(19)
1928–1932	Grimsby Town	139	(7)
1932–1933	St Johnstone	24	(2)
1933–1934	Cowdenbeath	18	(1)
1936–1937	Keith		
- * Club domestic league appearances and goals

John Priestley (19 August 1900 – January 1980) was a Scottish professional footballer who played for Johnstone, Chelsea, Grimsby Town, St Johnstone and Cowdenbeath.

== Playing career ==
Born in Johnstone, Priestley started his career with hometown club Johnstone F.C. in Scotland before moving south of the border to join Chelsea in May 1920 at the age of nineteen.

Priestley didn't make his debut for the Blues until a year after he joined the club, playing in a 0–0 draw away at Blackburn Rovers on 2 May 1921. He wouldn't make another appearance for Chelsea until Boxing Day 1922 (missing the 1921–22 season completely) turning out for the Pensioners in a 4–0 win at Nottingham Forest. Priestley made a further 22 appearances during the season, scoring his first goal in a 3–0 win against Bolton Wanderers in front of a crowd of 20,000 at Stamford Bridge.

The 1923–24 season saw Priestley make 42 appearances for Chelsea, scoring twice in victories against Middlesbrough and Manchester City, though he was unable to help the club stave off relegation to Division Two.

In the following season, Priestley would again feature heavily for Chelsea as the side finished 5th in Division Two, missing out on promotion by 10 points. The 1925–26 campaign proved to be more fortuitous for the Scottish half back as he quadrupled his goal tally from the previous year, despite making only six more appearances in all competitions for Chelsea, helping them to a 3rd-place finish in the league come the end of the season.

Priestley bettered his scoring record the following season, having his most prolific year for the Blues with 7 goals in 44 appearances. He netted twice from the penalty spot in a 2–1 win over Clapton Orient on New Year's Day 1927 and scored twice again as Chelsea beat Bradford City a month later on 5 February.

Though he only made 18 appearances in his last season (1927–28) on the King's Road, Priestley still pitched in with four goals, netting his last double in a 5–2 win against Bristol City at Stamford Bridge. This would be Chelsea's only victory after January 1928 with Priestley in the team as the side finished 3rd in Division Two, missing out on promotion once again.

After eight years with the West London club, in 1928 he signed for Grimsby Town, who would go on to be promoted to Division One the following year. He later returned to Scotland, spending a season apiece with St Johnstone and Cowdenbeath. In his late 30s he turned out for Highland League club Keith.
