= Sam Millington =

English footballer (fl mid-1920s and 1930s)

Simeon "Sam" Millington
Personal information
- Position: Goalkeeper

Senior career*
Years	Team	Apps	(Gls)
1926–1933	Chelsea	245	(0)
Total		245	(0)
- * Club domestic league appearances and goals

Simeon "Sam" Millington was an English footballer who played as a goalkeeper during the mid-1920s and 1930s. Over a 6-year period, he had 245 appearances and recorded 78 clean sheets for Chelsea. He was known for wearing a wide-brimmed flat cap while playing in goal.

Millington joined Chelsea in January 1926 from non-league Wellington and was the club's first-choice goalkeeper for the next six seasons. In 1930, he helped them win promotion back to the First Division, keeping 14 clean sheets. He retired at the end of the 1932/33 season due to injury, making way for the up-and-coming Vic Woodley.

He also made a non-speaking cameo appearance in the 1930 film, The Great Game, one of the first films to be made about football. He appeared alongside ex-Chelsea star Jack Cock and teammates George Mills and Andy Wilson.
