= Leslie Odell =

English footballer (1903–1955)

Personal information
- Full name: Leslie Frank Odell
- Date of birth: 4 January 1903
- Place of birth: Sandy, England
- Date of death: 20 May 1955 (aged 52)
- Height: 1.83 m (6 ft 0 in)
- Position: Full-back

Senior career*
Years	Team	Apps	(Gls)
- Biggleswade Town
1923–1924	Luton Town		
1924–1936	Chelsea	101	(7)
- Bedford Town
- * Club domestic league appearances and goals

Leslie Frank Odell (4 January 1903 – 20 May 1955) was an English footballer who played as a full-back.

== Club career ==
Odell started his career with Luton Town before joining Chelsea in 1924. He made his debut in a 3–3 draw with Barnsley, and in doing so became the 150th player to represent the club. After eleven years with Chelsea, Odell returned to Bedfordshire to sign with non-league Bedford Town.
