= Jack Meredith (footballer) =

English footballer (1899–1970)

Personal information
- Full name: John Meredith
- Date of birth: 12 September 1899
- Place of birth: Grimsby, England
- Date of death: 1970 (aged 70–71)
- Position: Midfielder

Senior career*
Years	Team	Apps	(Gls)
- Scunthorpe & Lindsey United
1923–1928	Blackpool	190	(27)
1928–1929	Chelsea	23	(6)
1930	Reading	5	(0)
- * Club domestic league appearances and goals

John Meredith (12 September 1899 – 1970) was an English professional footballer. He spent five years at Blackpool in the 1920s, making almost 200 Football League appearances for the club.

== Blackpool ==
Meredith made his debut for Frank Buckley's Blackpool on 6 October 1923, in a league game at Sheffield Wednesday. He went on to appear in all but one of the remaining 33 league games of the 1923–24 season. He scored three goals during this time: the first in a 3–2 victory at Fulham on 1 December; the second in a 6–2 win at Port Vale on 15 March; and the third in the very next game, also against Vale, but this time at Bloomfield Road.

The following campaign, 1924–25, Meredith missed only one of Blackpool's 49 league and cup games. He scored seven goals in the league and three in the FA Cup.

In 1925–26, Meredith achieved his highest goals tally of his time with the Seasiders. He netted eight goals in his 39 league appearances, including the only goal of the game in a home victory over South Shields on 13 March.

Meredith was ever-present in Blackpool's 43 league and cup games of 1926–27. He also scored six goals in the former competition.

1927–28 was Meredith's final season with Blackpool. Under new manager, Sydney Beaumont, Meredith made 35 league appearances and scored three goals. His final appearance for the club occurred on 31 March, in a 4–0 defeat at Leeds United. He joined Chelsea on 25 May 1928 and went on to score six goals in 23 League games.
