= Reginald Weaver (footballer) =

English footballer

Personal information
- Full name: Reginald William Weaver
- Date of birth: 14 September 1905
- Place of birth: Radstock, England
- Date of death: 16 July 1970 (aged 64)
- Place of death: Gloucester, England
- Position: Outside right

Senior career*
Years	Team	Apps	(Gls)
- Llanhilleth United
- Newport County
- Wolverhampton Wanderers
1929–1932	Chelsea	20	(8)
1932–1933	Bradford City	8	(3)
1933–1934	Chesterfield	11	(2)
- Newport County
- Bath City
- Gloucester City
Total		39+	(13+)
- * Club domestic league appearances and goals

Reginald William Weaver (14 September 1905 – 16 July 1970) was an English professional footballer who played as an outside right.

== Career ==
Born in Radstock, Weaver spent his early career with Llanhilleth United, Newport County, Wolverhampton Wanderers and Chelsea. At Chelsea he scored 8 goals in 20 league appearances between 1929 and 1932. He signed for Bradford City from Chelsea in June 1932, and scored 3 goals in 8 league appearances for the club, scoring 1 goal, before moving to Chesterfield in March 1933. At Chesterfield he scored 2 goals in 11 games in the 1933–34 season before returning to Newport County. He later played for Bath City and Gloucester City. He died in Gloucester on 16 July 1970.

== Sources ==
- Frost, Terry (1988). Bradford City A Complete Record 1903-1988. Breedon Books Sport. ISBN 0-907969-38-0.
