= George Rodgers (footballer) =

Scottish footballer

Personal information
- Full name: George Hay Shanks Burton Rodgers
- Date of birth: 19 December 1899
- Place of birth: Kinning Park, Scotland
- Date of death: 26 August 1982 (aged 82)
- Place of death: Inverness, Scotland
- Position: Centre half

Senior career*
Years	Team	Apps	(Gls)
–	Kilsyth Rangers		
1924–1931	Chelsea	119	(2)
1931–1934	Clachnacuddin		

Managerial career
- –: Clachnacuddin
- * Club domestic league appearances and goals

George Hay Shanks Burton Rodgers (19 December 1899 – 26 August 1982) was a Scottish footballer who played as a centre half, mainly for Chelsea – he made 122 appearances in major competitions for the West London club over seven seasons, helping them to gain promotion from the Football League Second Division in the 1929–30 season.

Born in Kinning Park (then an independent burgh just outside Glasgow), he spent part of his childhood in Cambuslang and began his football career to the north of the city with Kilsyth Rangers. After his time in England, Rodgers settled in the Scottish Highlands – as well as being player-coach of the local football club Clachnacuddin he opened a newsagent business in Merkinch (Inverness), and over several decades was heavily involved in the running of Clach, with several generations of his descendants also having strong ties to the Highland League side.
