= George Pearson (footballer) =

English footballer

Personal information
- Date of birth: 21 September 1901
- Place of birth: West Stanley, England
- Date of death: 1963
- Position: Winger

Youth career
- West Stanley
- Annfield Plain
- 1924–1925: Bury
- 1925–1926: Chelsea

Senior career*
Years	Team	Apps	(Gls)
1926–1933	Chelsea	197	(33)
1933–1934	Luton Town	14	(1)
1934–1935	Walsall	12	(0)
Total		223	(34)
- * Club domestic league appearances and goals

George William M. Pearson (21 September 1901 – 1963) was an English footballer who played as a winger.

== Club career ==
Born in West Stanley, Pearson started as a coalminer before joining Bury in 1924. After failing to break into the first team, he left for Chelsea a year later. After seven years in Chelsea's first team, where he amassed over 200 appearances in all competitions, he moved to Luton Town in 1933. He made fourteen appearances in the league for Luton, scoring once.
