= Harold Miller (footballer) =

English footballer

Harold Sydney Miller (20 May 1902 – 24 October 1988) was an English footballer who played between the wars.

An inside-forward, Miller's first professional club were Charlton Athletic, whom he joined from amateurs St Albans City. Miller made 20 appearances for Charlton, scoring 11 times. He won a solitary cap for England, which came against Sweden on 24 May 1923. Miller scored in this match as England won 3–1. He moved to across London to Chelsea in June 1923 for a fee of £1,500. He remained there until 1939, making 365 appearances and scoring 44 goals.
