= Albert Thain =

English footballer

Personal information
- Full name: Albert Edward Thain
- Date of birth: 20 April 1900
- Place of birth: Southall, England
- Date of death: 27 November 1979 (aged 79)
- Position: Inside forward

Senior career*
Years	Team	Apps	(Gls)
1920–1921	Southall		
1921–1922	Metropolitan Railway		
1922–1930	Chelsea	144	(44)
1931–1932	Bournemouth & Boscombe Athletic	20	(6)
Total		164	(50)
- * Club domestic league appearances and goals

Albert Edward Thain (20 April 1900 – 27 November 1979) was an English footballer who played in the Football League for Bournemouth & Boscombe Athletic and Chelsea.
