= Tommy Law =

Scottish footballer

Personal information
- Full name: Thomas Law
- Date of birth: 1 April 1908
- Place of birth: Glasgow, Scotland
- Date of death: 17 February 1976 (aged 67)
- Place of death: Wandsworth, England
- Height: 5 ft 8 1/2 in (1.74 m)
- Position: Left back

Youth career
- Bridgeton Waverley
- Chelsea

Senior career*
Years	Team	Apps	(Gls)
1925–1939	Chelsea	292	(15)

International career
1928–1930	Scotland	2	(0)
- * Club domestic league appearances and goals

Thomas Law (1 April 1908 – 17 February 1976) was a Scottish footballer. Playing at full-back, he spent his entire professional career at Chelsea.

Born in Glasgow, he signed for David Calderhead's Chelsea from local junior club Bridgeton Waverley and made his English Football League debut in 1926 against Bradford City. He soon established himself as Chelsea's first choice full-back, a position he would hold for most of his time at Stamford Bridge and was one of the less glamorous, though more reliable, members of a star-studded Chelsea squad which included his Scottish teammates, Hughie Gallacher, Alex Jackson, Willie Ferguson and Andy Wilson. He made 318 appearances for Chelsea, scoring 19 goals, mainly from penalties.

Law won two caps for Scotland, both against England. He made his debut during Scotland's famous "Wembley Wizards" 5–1 win over England at Wembley in 1928. His final cap came in the same fixture two years later, though this time the Scots lost 2–5.
