= Peter McKenna (English footballer) =

English footballer (1901–1964)

Personal information
- Full name: Peter Joseph McKenna
- Date of birth: 8 December 1901
- Place of birth: Toxteth, England
- Date of death: 1964 (aged 62–63)
- Position: Goalkeeper

Senior career*
Years	Team	Apps	(Gls)
1923–1924	Bangor City		
1924–1931	Chelsea	62	(0)
1931–1932	Southend United	2	(0)
Total		64	(0)
- * Club domestic league appearances and goals

Peter Joseph McKenna (8 December 1901 – 1964) was an English footballer who played in the Football League for Chelsea and Southend United.
