= John Townrow =

English professional footballer

Personal information
- Full name: John Ernest Townrow
- Date of birth: 28 March 1901
- Place of birth: West Ham, London, England
- Date of death: 11 April 1969 (aged 68)
- Height: 5 ft 11 in (1.80 m)
- Position: Centre-half

Youth career
- Fairbairn House

Senior career*
Years	Team	Apps	(Gls)
1918–1927	Clapton Orient	253	(5)
1927–1932	Chelsea	130	(3)
1932–1933	Bristol Rovers	10	(0)

International career
1925–1926	England	2	(0)

Managerial career
- Harrogate Town
- * Club domestic league appearances and goals

John Ernest Townrow (28 March 1901 – 11 April 1969) was an English professional footballer who played as a centre-half for Clapton Orient, Chelsea and Bristol Rovers in the Football League and for the England national football team.

Townrow was born in West Ham, now part of London, and attended Pelly Memorial School in the borough. He won two caps for England's schoolboy team, one of which came against Wales in 1915.

He began his professional football career at the end of the First World War with Second Division club Clapton Orient. He remained with the club until 1927, and played 253 league games for them. In April 1925 he won the first of his two international caps for England, in a 2–0 defeat to Scotland at Hampden Park. Townrow is one of only two men capped by England at senior level while an Orient player, the other being Owen Williams.

He joined Second Division rivals Chelsea in 1927, and went on to play 140 games for the club in all competitions and contribute to their promotion to the First Division in the 1929–30 season. His playing career finished with one season at Bristol Rovers in the Third Division South, where he played alongside his younger brother Frank.

Townrow was manager of Harrogate Town for a spell in the 1960s.

== Honours ==
Chelsea

- Football League Second Division runners-up: 1929–30
