= Andrew Wilson (footballer, born 1896) =

Scottish footballer (1896–1973)

Andy Wilson
Personal information
- Full name: Andrew Nesbit Wilson
- Date of birth: 14 February 1896
- Place of birth: Newmains, Lanarkshire, Scotland
- Date of death: 15 October 1973 (aged 77)
- Place of death: Putney, London, England
- Height: 5 ft 8 1/2 in (1.74 m)
- Position: Centre forward

Senior career*
Years	Team	Apps	(Gls)
- Cambuslang Rangers
1914–1919	Middlesbrough	9	(5)
1917–1918	→ Hamilton Academical (guest)	4	(5)
1918	→ Leeds City (guest)		
1918–1919	→ Heart of Midlothian (guest)	33	(32)
1919–1921	Dunfermline Athletic		
1921–1923	Middlesbrough	77	(51)
1923–1931	Chelsea	238	(59)
1931–1932	Queens Park Rangers	20	(3)
1932–1934	Sporting Club Nîmois		

International career
1919	Scotland (wartime)	2	(4)
1920–1923	Scotland	12	(13)

Managerial career
- 1934–1937: Walsall
- 1946–1947: Gravesend & Northfleet
- * Club domestic league appearances and goals

Andrew Nesbit Wilson (14 February 1896 – 15 October 1973) was a Scottish footballer who played for Middlesbrough, Heart of Midlothian, Dunfermline Athletic, Chelsea, Queens Park Rangers, Sporting Club Nîmois and the Scotland national team.

== Playing career ==
=== Middlesbrough and military service ===
Wilson was born in Newmains, Lanarkshire. He joined Middlesbrough from junior side Cambuslang Rangers in 1914.

His early career was interrupted by the First World War during which his left hand and forearm were shattered by enemy fire at Arras. He wore a glove to mask the withered hand and forearm for the rest of his life.

=== Heart of Midlothian and Leeds City ===
Wilson debuted for Heart of Midlothian in January 1918, playing for them until the end of the following season. The Scottish League championship continued to be played during the conflict, and he scored 32 times in 33 official appearances. He also played a handful of league matches for Hamilton Academical.

He guested a couple of times for Leeds City in April 1918, scoring twice on his Peacocks debut at Bradford Park Avenue on 6 April.

=== Dunfermline Athletic and return to Middlesbrough ===
In 1919 Wilson joined Dunfermline Athletic when they were part of the rebel Central League, a body outside Scottish Football League jurisdiction. When this league was absorbed by the SFL in 1921, those players previously contracted to a Scottish or English league side were obliged to return to whichever side held their registration as part of the agreement.

Thus Wilson returned to Middlesbrough in time for the 1921–22 season. He ended that season as not just 'Boro's top scorer but also the League's, with 31 strikes.

=== Chelsea ===
In November 1923 Wilson joined David Calderhead's sizeable contingent of Scots at Chelsea mid-season for £6,000. He was replaced at Middlesbrough the following month with Ian Dickson from Aston Villa for £3,000. Wilson ended the 1923–24 season as both Middlesbrough and Chelsea's top scorer; both clubs were relegated from the top flight that season.

He made 253 appearances for Chelsea and scored 52 goals in the next eight years. In that time he lined up beside compatriots such as Willie Ferguson, Tommy Law, Hughie Gallacher, Alex Jackson and Alec Cheyne.

=== Queens Park Rangers, Nîmes ===
He joined Queens Park Rangers in 1931, scoring three times in 20 league games, then spent a two-season sojourn in France with Sporting Club Nîmes.

=== International ===
At Dunfermline and Middlesbrough, Wilson was capped 12 times by Scotland between 1920 and 1923; he averaged more than a goal per game with 13 goals. He scored another four in two unofficial wartime internationals.

Ten of his Scotland goals, across nine matches, helped the nation to win the British Home Championship three times in a row between 1920–21 and 1922–23.

== Managerial and coaching ==
In 1934 he became Walsall manager. He then accepted a series of coaching positions, including at Chelsea, Gravesend and Northfleet, where he was the club's first manager following their formation in 1946. He spent the 1946–47 season at Gravesend before departing.

== Personal life ==
Wilson was a keen lawn bowler and reached the final of the 1945 National Championship triples.

His younger son, Jimmy, survived a tour as a tail-gunner in the far east during World War II. Jimmy played for Watford after the war.

== International goals ==
Scores and results list Scotland's goal tally first, score column indicates score after each Wilson goal.

List of international goals scored by Andrew Wilson
No.	Date	Venue	Opponent	Score	Result	Competition
1	13 March 1920	Celtic Park, Glasgow, Scotland	Ireland	1–0	3–0	British Home Championship
2	10 April 1920	Hillsborough Stadium, Sheffield, England	England	2–2	4–5	British Home Championship
3	12 February 1921	Pittodrie Park, Aberdeen, Scotland	Wales	1–0	2–1	British Home Championship
4	12 February 1921	Pittodrie Park, Aberdeen, Scotland	Wales	2–1	2–1	British Home Championship
5	26 February 1921	Windsor Park, Belfast, Ireland	Ireland	1–0	2–0	British Home Championship
6	9 April 1921	Hampden Park, Glasgow, Scotland	England	1–0	3–0	British Home Championship
7	4 March 1922	Celtic Park, Glasgow, Scotland	Ireland	1–1	2–1	British Home Championship
8	4 March 1922	Celtic Park, Glasgow, Scotland	Ireland	2–1	2–1	British Home Championship
9	8 April 1922	Villa Park, Birmingham, England	England	1–0	1–0	British Home Championship
10	3 March 1923	Windsor Park, Belfast, Northern Ireland	Ireland	1–0	1–0	1923 British Home Championship
11	17 March 1923	Love Street, Paisley, Scotland	Wales	1–0	2–0	1923 British Home Championship
12	17 March 1923	Love Street, Paisley, Scotland	Wales	2–0	2–0	1923 British Home Championship
13	14 April 1923	Hampden Park, Glasgow, Scotland	England	2–2	2–2	1923 British Home Championship

== See also ==
- List of Scotland national football team captains
- List of Scotland wartime international footballers
- List of Scottish football families
