= Jackie Crawford =

English footballer (1896–1975)

Personal information
- Full name: John Forsyth Crawford
- Date of birth: 26 September 1896
- Place of birth: Jarrow, County Durham, England
- Date of death: 27 September 1975 (aged 79)
- Place of death: Epsom, Surrey, England
- Height: 5 ft 5 in (1.65 m)
- Position: Outside forward

Senior career*
Years	Team	Apps	(Gls)
- Palmers' Works F.C.
- Royal Navy
- Jarrow Town F.C.
1920–1923	Hull City		
1923–1934	Chelsea	308	(27)
1934–1937	Queens Park Rangers	59	(18)

International career
1931	England	1	(0)
- * Club domestic league appearances and goals

John Forsyth Crawford (26 September 1896 – 27 September 1975) was an English footballer who played as a winger throughout his career.

== Playing career ==
Born in Jarrow, Crawford started his professional career with Hull City, before signing for Chelsea for £3,000 in May 1923. He quickly became a regular in the side for the next five years, and after several near-misses, eventually helped them gain promotion back to the First Division in 1929-30. Thereafter, the ageing Crawford was overshadowed by new star signings like Hughie Gallacher and Alex Jackson, and joined Queens Park Rangers in 1934. He made 308 appearances for Chelsea, scoring 27 goals.

== International career ==
Crawford was capped once for England, playing the full 90 minutes in a 2–0 loss to Scotland at Hampden Park on 28 March 1931.
