= Jock Cameron (footballer) =

Scottish footballer and manager (1879–1950)

- Cameron in a Port Vale team photo.

Personal information
- Full name: John Bell Cameron
- Date of birth: 16 February 1879
- Place of birth: Kirkwood, Coatbridge, Scotland
- Date of death: 5 July 1950 (aged 71)
- Place of death: Blackburn, England
- Height: 5 ft 9 in (1.75 m)
- Position: Full back

Youth career
- Kirkwood Thistle

Senior career*
| Years | Team | Apps | (Gls) |
| 1900–1904 | St Mirren | | |
| 1904–1907 | Blackburn Rovers | 64 | (0) |
| 1907–1913 | Chelsea | 179 | (0) |
| 1913–1914 | Port Vale | 32 | (0) |
| Total | | 255 | (0) |

International career
| 1903–1904 | Scottish League XI | 3 | (0) |
| 1904–1909 | Scotland | 2 | (0) |

Managerial career
- 1918–1919: Port Vale
- * Club domestic league appearances and goals

John Bell Cameron (16 February 1879 – 5 July 1950) was a Scottish international football player and manager. He played for St Mirren before joining Blackburn Rovers in 1904. He spent three years at the club before signing for First Division rivals Chelsea. After they were relegated, he helped Chelsea to win promotion out of the Second Division in 1911–12. He signed with non-League Port Vale in 1913, departing the following year, only to return in 1916. He briefly served as the club's manager from August 1918 until his departure in January 1919.

He won two caps for Scotland in 1903 and 1904, and also represented a Scottish League XI three times.

== Club career ==
Cameron played for Kirkwood Thistle and St Mirren, before moving south to partner Bob Crompton at English First Division club Blackburn Rovers in April 1904. He replaced Jack Eastham as the club's regular left-back and played 64 league games for the club from 1904 to 1907. He was an ever-present in the 1904–05 season, before he was replaced at left-back by Arthur Cowell by the 1905–06 campaign. He then signed with Chelsea for a £900 fee in October 1907, who had won promotion out of the Second Division in 1907, and would be appointed as Chelsea's captain. After maintaining their top-flight status in 1907–08 and 1908–09, the "Pensioners" were relegated in 1909–10. Cameron stayed at the club as they missed out on promotion by one place and two points in 1910–11, before he helped Chelsea to promotion as Second Division runners-up in 1911–12; they finished level on points with champions Derby County, who had a superior goal average. He then helped the club to finish one place above the relegation zone in 1912–13. He played a total of 179 league and 15 cup appearances for Chelsea.

He joined Port Vale in the summer of 1913. It was a step down in footballing terms, as proved by the opponents of his 1 September debut – Blackburn Rovers Reserves; the game finished 3–3. He played 32 games in the Central League and helped the club qualify for the FA Cup first round. He departed at the end of the season. He returned in August 1916. He became the first-choice left-back once again in March 1917 and, in August 1918, was appointed both the club captain and team manager. He largely stopped playing to concentrate on management duties but was sacked in January 1919, at which point he retired.

== International career ==
Cameron earned his first cap on 26 March 1904, in a 1–1 draw with Ireland in the 1904 British Home Championship. His second cap came against England on 3 April 1909 in the 1909 British Home Championship, Scotland lost 2–0. While he was with St Mirren, Cameron represented the Scottish Football League XI three times.

== Career statistics ==
=== Club statistics ===
Appearances and goals by club, season and competition
| Club | Season | League | | | FA Cup | | Total | |
| Club | Season | Division | Apps | Goals | Apps | Goals | Apps | Goals |
|---|---|---|---|---|---|---|---|---|
| Blackburn Rovers | 1903–04 | First Division | 2 | 0 | 0 | 0 | 2 | 0 |
| Blackburn Rovers | 1904–05 | First Division | 34 | 0 | 1 | 0 | 35 | 0 |
| Blackburn Rovers | 1905–06 | First Division | 7 | 0 | 0 | 0 | 7 | 0 |
| Blackburn Rovers | 1906–07 | First Division | 19 | 0 | 2 | 0 | 21 | 0 |
| Blackburn Rovers | 1907–08 | First Division | 2 | 0 | 0 | 0 | 2 | 0 |
| Blackburn Rovers | Total | | 64 | 0 | 3 | 0 | 67 | 0 |
| Chelsea | 1907–08 | First Division | 32 | 0 | 2 | 0 | 34 | 0 |
| Chelsea | 1908–09 | First Division | 35 | 0 | 3 | 0 | 38 | 0 |
| Chelsea | 1909–10 | First Division | 26 | 0 | 0 | 0 | 26 | 0 |
| Chelsea | 1910–11 | Second Division | 34 | 0 | 6 | 0 | 40 | 0 |
| Chelsea | 1911–12 | Second Division | 36 | 0 | 2 | 0 | 38 | 0 |
| Chelsea | 1912–13 | Second Division | 16 | 0 | 2 | 0 | 18 | 0 |
| Chelsea | Total | | 179 | 0 | 15 | 0 | 194 | 0 |
| Port Vale | 1913–14 | Central League | 32 | 0 | 9 | 0 | 41 | 0 |
| Career total | | | 275 | 0 | 27 | 0 | 302 | 0 |

=== International statistics ===
Scotland national team
| Year | Apps | Goals |
|---|---|---|
| 1904 | 1 | 0 |
| 1909 | 1 | 0 |
| Total | 2 | 0 |

== Honours ==
Chelsea

- Football League Second Division second-place promotion: 1911–12
