= 1908–09 in Scottish football =

Football in Scotland
- Season: 1908–09

1908–09 in Scottish football

Division One champions
- Celtic

Division Two champions
- Abercorn

Scottish Cup winners
- Withheld

Junior Cup winners
- Kilwinning Rangers

Scotland national team
- 1909 BHC

The 1908–09 season was the 36th season of competitive football in Scotland and the 19th season of the Scottish Football League.

== League competitions ==
=== Scottish League Division One ===
Pos	Team	Pld	W	D	L	GF	GA	GD	Pts
1	Celtic (C)	34	23	5	6	71	24	+47	51
2	Dundee	34	22	6	6	70	32	+38	50
3	Clyde	34	21	6	7	61	37	+24	48
4	Rangers	34	19	7	8	91	38	+53	45
5	Airdrieonians	34	16	9	9	67	46	+21	41
6	Hibernian	34	16	7	11	40	32	+8	39
7	St Mirren	34	15	6	13	53	45	+8	36
8	Aberdeen	34	15	6	13	61	53	+8	36
9	Kilmarnock	34	13	7	14	47	61	−14	33
10	Falkirk	34	13	7	14	58	56	+2	33
11	Heart of Midlothian	34	12	8	14	54	49	+5	32
12	Third Lanark	34	11	10	13	56	49	+7	32
13	Motherwell	34	11	6	17	47	73	−26	28
14	Port Glasgow Athletic	34	10	8	16	39	52	−13	28
15	Queen's Park	34	6	13	15	42	65	−23	25
16	Hamilton Academical	34	6	12	16	42	72	−30	24
17	Morton	34	8	7	19	39	90	−51	23
18	Partick Thistle	34	2	4	28	38	102	−64	8

Source: "1908-1909 Division 1 - SPFL Archive". SPFL.
(C) Champions

Champions: Celtic

=== Scottish League Division Two ===
Pos	Team	Pld	W	D	L	GF	GA	GD	Pts
1	Abercorn (C)	22	13	5	4	39	17	+22	31
2	Raith Rovers	22	11	6	5	46	22	+24	28
2	Vale of Leven	22	12	4	6	38	25	+13	28
4	Dumbarton	22	10	5	7	34	34	0	25
5	Ayr	22	10	3	9	43	36	+7	23
5	Leith Athletic	22	10	3	9	37	33	+4	23
7	Ayr Parkhouse	22	8	5	9	29	31	−2	21
7	East Stirlingshire	22	9	3	10	27	33	−6	21
7	St Bernard's	22	9	3	10	34	37	−3	21
10	Albion Rovers	22	9	2	11	37	47	−10	20
11	Cowdenbeath	22	4	4	14	19	42	−23	12
12	Arthurlie	22	5	1	16	29	55	−26	11

Source: statto.com
Rules for classification: Teams finish equal if level on points. Points system: 2 points for a win, 1 point for a draw, 0 points for a loss
(C) Champions

== Other honours ==
=== Cup honours ===
==== National ====
Competition	Winner	Score	Runner-up
Scottish Cup	Cup withheld by SFA		
Scottish Qualifying Cup	Vale of Leven	5 – 2	Brechin City
Scottish Consolation Cup	Wishaw Thistle	2 – 1	Arbroath
Scottish Junior Cup	Kilwinning Rangers	1 – 0 (Note: Replay needed)	Strathclyde

==== County ====
Competition	Winner	Score	Runner-up
Aberdeenshire Cup	Aberdeen	4 – 0	Buckie Thistle
Ayrshire Cup	Hurlford	1 – 0	Ayr
Border Cup	Berwick Rangers	2 – 1	Selkirk
Dumbartonshire Cup	Renton	1 – 0	Dumbarton
East of Scotland Shield	Hibernian	2 – 0 (Note: Second replay needed.)	Hearts
Fife Cup	Raith Rovers	3 – 0	East Fife
Forfarshire Cup	Dundee	2 – 0	Brechin City
Glasgow Cup	Third Lanark	4 – 0	Celtic
Lanarkshire Cup	Airdrie	2 – 0	Hamilton
Linlithgowshire Cup	Bo'ness	2 – 1	Bathgate
North of Scotland Cup	Inverness Citadel	2 – 0	Clachnacuddin
Perthshire Cup	St Johnstone	5 – 2	Dunblane
Renfrewshire Cup	Port Glasgow Athletic	2 – 1 (Note: Play off needed)	Morton
Southern Counties Cup	Dalbeattie Star	2 – 1	Nithsdale Wanderers
Stirlingshire Cup	Alloa	2 – 1	Falkirk

=== Non-league honours ===
Highland League

Top Three
Pos	Team	Pld	W	D	L	GF	GA	GD	Pts
1	Inverness Citadel	12	7	3	2	20	9	+11	17
2	Clachnacuddin	12	7	2	3	25	17	+8	16
3	Forres Mechanics	12	5	3	4	20	19	+1	13

Source: SFHA

Other Senior Leagues

Division	Winner
Banffshire League	Buckie Thistle
Border Senior League	Berwick Rangers
Midland League	Falkirk 'A'
Northern League	Dundee 'A'
Perthshire League	Crieff Morrisonians
Scottish Combination	Galston
Scottish Union	Falkirk 'A'

== Edinburgh Exhibition ==
An invitational football tournament was held at the Exhibition Sports Grounds, Saughton, Edinburgh in August 1908, as part of the Scottish National Exhibition event being held there during that summer. There was a tournament for junior teams from the Lothians held in association with the exhibition.

Competition	Winner	Score	Runner-up
Edinburgh Exhibition Cup	Rangers	1 – 1 (Note: Won on a coin toss.)	Dundee
Ed. Junior Exhibition Cup	Newtongrange Star	2 – 0	Arniston Rangers

== Scotland national team ==
Date	Venue	Opponents	Score (Note: Scotland's score is shown first.)	Competition	Scotland scorer(s)
1 March 1909	Racecourse Ground, Wrexham (A)	Wales	2–3	BHC	Bobby Walker, Harry Paul
15 March 1909	Ibrox Park, Glasgow (H)	Ireland	5–0	BHC	Jimmy McMenemy (2), Sandy Thomson, Sandy MacFarlane, Harry Paul
3 April 1909	Crystal Palace, London (A)	England	0–2	BHC	

Key:

- (H) = Home match
- (A) = Away match
- BHC = British Home Championship

Team	Pld	W	D	L	GF	GA	GD	Pts
England (C)	3	3	0	0	8	0	+8	6
Wales	3	2	0	1	6	6	0	4
Scotland	3	1	0	2	7	5	+2	2
Ireland	3	0	0	3	2	12	−10	0

Rules for classification: 1) points. The points system worked as follows: 2 points for a win and 1 point for a draw.
(C) Champions

== Other national teams ==
=== Scottish League XI ===
Date	Venue	Opponents	Score (Note: Scottish League XI's score is shown first.)	Scotland scorer(s)
10 February 1909	Belfast (A)	(Northern Ireland) Irish League XI	2–1	Jimmy Quinn (2)
27 February 1909	Celtic Park, Glasgow (H)	(England) Football League XI	3–1	Jimmy Quinn (2), Harold Paul

== See also ==
- Edinburgh Exhibition Cup
- 1908–09 Aberdeen F.C. season
- 1908–09 Celtic F.C. season
- 1908–09 Dumbarton F.C. season
- 1908–09 Dundee F.C. season
- 1908–09 Heart of Midlothian F.C. season
- 1908–09 Hibernian F.C. season
- 1908–09 Rangers F.C. season
