= Walter Bettridge =

English footballer

Personal information
- Full name: Walter Bettridge
- Date of birth: 26 October 1886
- Place of birth: Oakthorpe, England
- Date of death: 23 December 1931 (aged 45)
- Place of death: Measham, England
- Height: 5 ft 8 in (1.73 m)
- Position: Right back

Senior career*
Years	Team	Apps	(Gls)
- Oakthorpe Albion
- Measham United
- Worksop Town
–1909	Burton United		
1909–1922	Chelsea	224	(0)
1922–1923	Gillingham	19	(0)
- Peterborough & Fletton United
- * Club domestic league appearances and goals

Walter Bettridge (26 October 1886 – 23 December 1931) was an English professional footballer who made over 220 appearances for Chelsea in the Football League. He was a "lightweight" right back who was "fearless in stopping forwards".

== Club career ==
A right back, Bettridge began his career with local non-League clubs Oakthorpe Albion, Measham United, Worksop Town and Burton United. He transferred to First Division club Chelsea in 1909 and was a part of the club's 1911–12 Second Division promotion-winning and 1915 FA Cup final-losing squads. Either side of the First World War, Bettridge made 255 appearances for the club. In June 1922, aged 36, he joined Gillingham of the Third Division South, where he spent one season, before finishing his career with Peterborough & Fletton United.

== Personal life ==
In January 1916, during the First World War, Bettridge enlisted in as an air mechanic in the Royal Flying Corps. He trained as a fitter and attained the rank of air mechanic 1st class. After serving in both the Royal Flying Corps and the Royal Air Force at the Royal Aircraft Factory, Bettridge was demobilized in 1919. He died in December 1931, aged 45.

== Career statistics ==
Appearances and goals by club, season and competition
Club	Season	League			National cup (Note: Includes FA Cup)		Total	
Club	Season	Division	Apps	Goals	Apps	Goals	Apps	Goals
Chelsea	1909–10	First Division	18	0	2	0	20	0
Chelsea	1910–11	Second Division	37	0	6	0	43	0
Chelsea	1911–12	Second Division	26	0	2	0	28	0
Chelsea	1912–13	First Division	33	0	1	0	34	0
Chelsea	1913–14	First Division	16	0	1	0	17	0
Chelsea	1914–15	First Division	25	0	8	0	33	0
Chelsea	1919–20	First Division	41	0	5	0	46	0
Chelsea	1920–21	First Division	28	0	6	0	34	0
Chelsea	Total		224	0	31	0	255	0
Gillingham	1922–23	Third Division South	19	0	0	0	19	0
Career total			243	0	31	0	274	0

== Honours ==
Chelsea

- Football League Second Division second-place promotion: 1911–12
- FA Cup runner-up: 1914–15
