= Vivian Woodward =

English footballer (1879-1954)

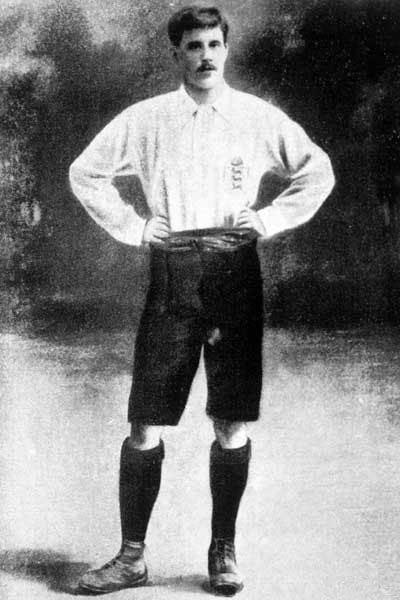
- Woodward while playing for England

Personal information
- Full name: Vivian John Woordward
- Date of birth: 3 June 1879
- Place of birth: Kennington, Surrey, England
- Date of death: 31 January 1954 (aged 74)
- Place of death: Ealing, England
- Height: 5 ft 10 1/2 in (1.79 m)
- Positions: Centre forward; inside forward

Youth career
- Ascham College

Senior career*
Years	Team	Apps	(Gls)
1895–1900	Clacton Town	25+	(46+)
1900–1901	Harwich & Parkeston		
1901	Chelmsford		
1901–1909	Tottenham Hotspur	146	(68 (Note: Fourteen appearances and seven goals in Western League, one appearance in London League))
1909	Chelmsford		
1909–1915	Chelsea	106	(30)
1919–1920	Clacton Town	6	(4)
Total		283	(148)

International career
1903–1911	England	23	(29)
1906–1914	England Amateurs	30	(46)
1908–1912	Great Britain	6	(5)
- Southern League XI
1908–1913	Football League XI	3	(3)
Medal record
Men's football
Representing Great Britain
Olympic Games
Gold medal – first place	1908 London	Team competition
Gold medal – first place	1912 Stockholm	Team competition
- * Club domestic league appearances and goals

Vivian John Woodward (3 June 1879 – 31 January 1954) was an English footballer who enjoyed the peak of his career from the turn of the 20th century to the outbreak of the First World War. He played for Tottenham Hotspur and Chelsea.

Internationally, Woodward captained Great Britain to gold medals at the 1908 Olympics in London and in Stockholm in 1912, and made a combined 59 international appearances for a combination of England, England Amateurs, and Great Britain. His combined record for England of 75 goals in 53 matches (1.42 goals a game) is still the highest international record of any player to have scored more than 50 goals for their country, whilst his record of 75 goals was the highest combined total of international goals scored by any English footballer until Harry Kane scored his 75th and 76th goals for England in October 2025. Woodward took part in ten British Home Championships, lifting the trophy eight times. In the 1903-04 Home Championship, Woodward was the top scorer with 4 goals, whilst in the 1908-09 tournament he was the joint top goalscorer with 3 goals. Woodward is the 5th highest all-time record goalscorer of the Home Championship with 14 goals in total.

He served in the British Army during the First World War, and as a result missed out on Chelsea's run to their first-ever FA Cup final in 1915. Woodward's injuries during the war caused his retirement from football. He then served on Chelsea's Board between 1922 and 1930 as a director of the club.

== Club career ==
Woodward began his career at Clacton Town. Following spells at Harwich & Parkeston and Chelmsford, he joined Tottenham Hotspur in March 1901, who in the same year would win the FA Cup. Woodward's debut for Tottenham occurred in the Southern League on 6 April 1901 in a home match against Bristol City which Spurs won 1–0. Due to work and cricket commitments, he did not begin to appear regularly for the team until the 1902–03 season. In nine seasons at White Hart Lane, he made 169 appearances and scored 73 goals. Tottenham was elected to the Second Division of the Football League for the 1908–09 season, and Woodward scored Spurs' first-ever goal in the Football League in September 1908 against Wolverhampton Wanderers that finished 3–0. He helped the team win promotion to the First Division that season.

Before the start of the 1909 season, Woodward decided to retire to concentrate on his architectural practice and cricket. He had a short spell back with Chelmsford, but was persuaded to join David Calderhead's Chelsea on 20 November 1909. He went on to play in a total of 116 games for them, scoring 34 goals. He was their leading scorer in the 1912–13 season with ten goals.

At the start of the First World War Woodward enlisted in the British Army and as a result did not play many matches during the 1914–15 season. He was given special leave to join Chelsea at Old Trafford for the FA Cup Final as Bob Thomson was injured, however Thomson recovered and Woodward refused to play, believing it was immoral to deny Thomson his chance to play in an FA Cup final as Woodward himself had not played in any of Chelsea's matches in their run to the final.

In January 1916, Woodward was injured in the right thigh by a German grenade. Following this injury he was unable to return to top-tier football, returning to his first club, Clacton Town, before retiring.

== International career ==
He made his England debut in 1903, scoring twice in a 4–0 win against Ireland. Between 1903 and 1911, he won 23 full caps and scored 29 goals, setting an English record that would last until the 1950s. He also played in three unofficial international matches against South Africa in 1910, scoring a further four goals. At the time, England only usually played three matches a season, for the British Home Championship, but two tours to central Europe in 1908 and 1909 netted Woodward 15 goals (over half his total). He held the overall England goalscoring record, either jointly or alone, for 47 years – longer than any other player until surpassed by Tom Finney in 1958. With his 28th and 29th goals, the last of his career, he overhauled Steve Bloomer against Wales in March 1911, and was not himself overtaken until Tom Finney scored his 30th (and last) goal in October 1958.

He also turned out 44 times for England Amateurs and scored 57 goals. England Amateurs played most of its internationals against the full representative sides of Europe, whose football was much less developed than that of the British at the time, and this huge gap between them often resulted in the Europeans getting trashed by the English, and Woodward would thus often score several goals per match. For instance, in one match against France in 1906, the Times and Sporting Life credit Woodward with eight goals in a 15–0 win, although FIFA's official record of the match credits him with only four goals. However, he did score six against Netherlands in 1909.

The Home Nations did not recognise its matches against England Amateurs, and thus, 12 goals in 14 of his appearances are considered unofficial, four against Ireland, six against Wales, and 2 goals in an unofficial match against Sweden on 12 June 1914 as this game was not regarded as a full international by the Swedish Football Association. However, the remaining 30 appearances for England amateurs and 46 goals (including 6 matches and 5 goals for Great Britain at the Olympics) were made in matches recognised as full internationals only by the opposition's Football Associations, though not by the FA, UEFA or FIFA, which means that Woodward scored a total of 75 goals in 53 matches that were considered official internationals by the opposing sides, which could make him the first footballer to score 50 international goals, ahead of Imre Schlosser, who achieved it on 3 June 1917. Woodward scored a combined total of 10 international hat-tricks for the England teams, 4 for the main side and 6 for the Amateurs, all of which in friendlies sept for the one he netted against Wales at the 1907–08 British Home Championship on 16 March 1908, which is also the only one he netted against a Home Nation. His hat-trick tally also includes a 6-goal haul in a 9–1 win over the Netherlands on 11 December 1909, and four 4-goal hauls, two for each of the England teams.

Woodward also represented the Football League XI and the Southern League XI. He also toured the United States with The Pilgrims in 1905.

His combined 75 goals for England at amateur and senior level remained a record for any of the British sides until 14 October 2025, when Harry Kane equalled and then surpassed it against in a FIFA World Cup qualifier against Latvia.

== Olympic career ==
Woodward captained Great Britain to gold medals at the 1908 Olympics in London and then in Stockholm in 1912, scoring three goals in 1908, including one in the final, and other two in 1912.

== Military career ==
He joined the 17th Battalion of the Middlesex Regiment. This was one of the pals battalions formed during the early stages of World War I. It was known as a "Football Battalion" and it included many members of Woodward's former team Tottenham Hotspur. He served on the Western Front and was wounded in 1916. He attained the rank of captain.

== Personal life ==
Woodward grew up and was educated in Clacton, Essex. It has been suggested that the town's team, Clacton Town, was formed by Woodward's headteacher specifically for him to have a team to play in.

Originally trained as an architect, following his retirement from football Woodward resumed the profession, as well as serving as a director at Chelsea. He also owned a farm near Clacton and a shop in nearby Frinton-on-Sea. In World War II Woodward served as an Air Raid Warden.

Woodward died in a nursing home in Ealing, London on 31 January 1954.

== Career statistics ==
=== Club ===
Appearances and goals by club, season, and competition. Only official games are included in this table.
Club	Season	League			FA Cup		Other		Total	
Club	Season	Division	Apps	Goals	Apps	Goals	Apps	Goals	Apps	Goals
Clacton Town	1895–96	Division 2	1	2	0	0	0	0	1	2
Clacton Town	1896–97	Division 2	7	13	0	0	0	0	7	13
Clacton Town	1897–98	Division 2	1	2	0	0	1 (Note: Appearance in Essex Junior Cup)	0	2	2
Clacton Town	1898–99	Division 2	8	18	0	0	1 (Note: Appearance in Essex Junior Cup)	0	9	18
Clacton Town	1899–1900	Division 2	4	4	0	0	1 (Note: Appearance in Essex Junior Cup)	0	5	4
Clacton Town	1900–01	Division 1	4	7	0	0	1 (Note: Appearance in Harwich Charity Cup)	0	5	7
Clacton Town	Total		25	46	0	0	4	0	29	46
Harwich	1900–01	Division 1	0	0	0	0	1 (Note: Appearance in FA Amateur Cup)	3	1	3
Tottenham Hotspur	1900–01	Southern League First Division	1	0	0	0	1 (Note: Appearances in Western League)	1	2	1
Tottenham Hotspur	1901–02	Southern League First Division	2	0	0	0	1	2	3	2
Tottenham Hotspur	1902–03	Southern League First Division	12	4	4	3	3	0	19	7
Tottenham Hotspur	1903–04	Southern League First Division	17	10	4	1	6 (Note: Five appearances and two goals in Western League, one appearance in London League)	2	27	13
Tottenham Hotspur	1904–05	Southern League First Division	20	7	4	0	3 (Note: Two appearances in Western League, one appearance and 5 goals in Southern Charity Cup)	5	27	12
Tottenham Hotspur	1905–06	Southern League First Division	12	5	3	1	1	2	16	8
Tottenham Hotspur	1906–07	Southern League First Division	20	7	3	0	0	0	23	7
Tottenham Hotspur	1907–08	Southern League First Division	20	10	1	0	1	0	22	10
Tottenham Hotspur	1908–09	Second Division	27	18	4	0	—		31	18
Tottenham Hotspur	Total		131	61	23	5	16	12	170	78
Chelsea	1909–10	First Division	13	5	2	0	—		15	5
Chelsea	1910–11	Second Division	19	6	3	3	—		22	9
Chelsea	1911–12	Second Division	14	2	0	0	—		14	2
Chelsea	1912–13	First Division	27	10	3	1	—		30	11
Chelsea	1913–14	First Division	27	4	2	0	—		29	4
Chelsea	1914–15	First Division	6	3	0	0	—		6	3
Chelsea	Total		106	30	10	4	—		116	34
Career total			262	137	33	9	21	15	316	161

=== International ===
Appearances and goals by national team and year
National team	Year	Apps	Goals
England	1903	3	4
England	1904	2	0
England	1905	3	2
England	1906	0	0
England	1907	1	0
England	1908	7	10
England	1909	5	11
England	1910	1	0
England	1911	1	2
Total		23	29

Scores and results of England listed first, score column indicates score after each Woodward goal.

List of international goals scored by Vivian Woodward
No.	Cap	Date	Venue	Opponent	Score	Result	Competition	Ref.
1	1	14 February 1903	Molineux Stadium, Wolverhampton, England	Ireland	1–0	4–0	1902–03 British Home Championship	
2	1	14 February 1903	Molineux Stadium, Wolverhampton, England	Ireland	2–0	4–0	1902–03 British Home Championship	
3	2	2 March 1903	Fratton Park, Portsmouth, England	Wales	2–1	2–1	1902–03 British Home Championship	
4	3	4 April 1903	Bramall Lane, Sheffield, England	Scotland	1–0	1–2	1902–03 British Home Championship	
5	7	27 March 1905	Anfield, Liverpool, England	Wales	1–0	3–1	1904–05 British Home Championship	
6	7	27 March 1905	Anfield, Liverpool, England	Wales	3–1	3–1	1904–05 British Home Championship	
7	10	15 February 1908	Solitude, Belfast, Northern Ireland	Ireland	2–1	3–1	1907–08 British Home Championship	
8	11	16 March 1908	Racecourse Ground, Wrexham, Wales	Wales	1–0	7–1	1907–08 British Home Championship	
9	11	16 March 1908	Racecourse Ground, Wrexham, Wales	Wales	6–0	7–1	1907–08 British Home Championship	
10	11	16 March 1908	Racecourse Ground, Wrexham, Wales	Wales	7–0	7–1	1907–08 British Home Championship	
11	13	6 June 1908	Cricketer Platz, Vienna, Austria	Austria	3–0	6–1	Friendly	
12	14	8 June 1908	Hohe Warte Stadium, Vienna, Austria	Austria	1–0	11–1	Friendly	
13	14	8 June 1908	Hohe Warte Stadium, Vienna, Austria	Austria	5–0	11–1	Friendly	
14	14	8 June 1908	Hohe Warte Stadium, Vienna, Austria	Austria	6–0	11–1	Friendly	
15	14	8 June 1908	Hohe Warte Stadium, Vienna, Austria	Austria	10–1	11–1	Friendly	
16	15	10 June 1908	Millenáris Sporttelep, Budapest, Hungary	Hungary	1–0	7–0	Friendly	
17	17	13 February 1909	Park Avenue, Bradford, England	Ireland	2–0	4–0	1908–09 British Home Championship	
18	17	13 February 1909	Park Avenue, Bradford, England	Ireland	3–0	4–0	1908–09 British Home Championship	
19	19	29 May 1909 (Note: Other sources credit England's fourth goal to an own goal from János Weinber, but the official report of the Games and contemporary newspaper reports agree Woodward scored the last goal.)	Millenáris Sporttelep, Budapest, Hungary	Hungary	2–0	4–2	Friendly	
20	19	29 May 1909	Millenáris Sporttelep, Budapest, Hungary	Hungary	4–2	4–2	Friendly	
21	20	31 May 1909	Millenáris Sporttelep, Budapest, Hungary	Hungary	2–0	8–2	Friendly	
22	20	31 May 1909	Millenáris Sporttelep, Budapest, Hungary	Hungary	4–0	8–2	Friendly	
23	20	31 May 1909	Millenáris Sporttelep, Budapest, Hungary	Hungary	6–1	8–2	Friendly	
24	20	31 May 1909	Millenáris Sporttelep, Budapest, Hungary	Hungary	7–1	8–2	Friendly	
25	21	1 June 1909	Hohe Warte Stadium, Vienna, Austria	Austria	1–0	7–1	Friendly	
26	21	1 June 1909	Hohe Warte Stadium, Vienna, Austria	Austria	3–0	7–1	Friendly	
27	21	1 June 1909	Hohe Warte Stadium, Vienna, Austria	Austria	6–1	7–1	Friendly	
28	23	13 March 1911	The Den, London, England	Wales	1–0	3–0	1910–11 British Home Championship	
29	23	13 March 1911	The Den, London, England	Wales	3–0	3–0	1910–11 British Home Championship	

=== England amateurs ===
Scores and results of England amateur is listed first and the score column indicates the score after each Woodward goal.

List of international goals scored by Vivian Woodward
No.	Cap	Date	Venue	Opponent	Score	Result	Competition	Ref
1	1	1 November 1906	Parc des Princes, Paris, France	France	3–0	15–0	Friendly	
2	1	1 November 1906	Parc des Princes, Paris, France	France	9–0	15–0	Friendly	
3	1	1 November 1906	Parc des Princes, Paris, France	France	10–0	15–0	Friendly	
4	1	1 November 1906	Parc des Princes, Paris, France	France	11–0	15–0	Friendly	
5	2	1 April 1907	De Diepput, Den Haag, The Hague, Netherlands	Netherlands	3-1	8–1	Friendly	
6	3	21 December 1907	Feethams, Darlington, England	Netherlands	1–0	12–2	Friendly	
7	3	21 December 1907	Feethams, Darlington, England	Netherlands	5–0	12–2	Friendly	
8	3	21 December 1907	Feethams, Darlington, England	Netherlands	9–1	12–2	Friendly	
9	4	23 March 1908	Park Royal Stadium, London, England	France	3–0	12–0	Friendly	
10	4	23 March 1908	Park Royal Stadium, London, England	France	8–0	12–0	Friendly	
11	4	23 March 1908	Park Royal Stadium, London, England	France	10–0	12–0	Friendly	
12	5	18 April 1908	Sukkelweg, Bruxelles, Belgium	Belgium	?	8–2	Friendly	
13	5	18 April 1908	Sukkelweg, Bruxelles, Belgium	Belgium	?	8–2	Friendly	
14	5	18 April 1908	Sukkelweg, Bruxelles, Belgium	Belgium	?	8–2	Friendly	
15	6	20 April 1908	Viktoria field, Berlin-Mariendorf, Germany	Germany	2-0	5–1	Friendly	
16	6	20 April 1908	Viktoria field, Berlin-Mariendorf, Germany	Germany	5–1	5–1	Friendly	
17	7	20 October 1908	White City, London, England	Sweden	?	12–1	1908 Summer Olympics First round	
18	7	20 October 1908	White City, London, England	Sweden	?	12–1	1908 Summer Olympics First round	
19	9	24 October 1908	White City, London, England	Denmark	2-0	2–0	1908 Summer Olympics Final	
20	10	17 April 1909	White Hart Lane, London, England	Belgium	?	11–2	Friendly	
21	10	17 April 1909	White Hart Lane, London, England	Belgium	?	11–2	Friendly	
22	11	20 May 1909	Landhof, Basel, Switzerland	Switzerland	?	9–0	Friendly	
23	11	20 May 1909	Landhof, Basel, Switzerland	Switzerland	?	9–0	Friendly	
24	11	20 May 1909	Landhof, Basel, Switzerland	Switzerland	?	9–0	Friendly	
25	11	20 May 1909	Landhof, Basel, Switzerland	Switzerland	?	9–0	Friendly	
26	12	22 May 1909	Stade de la F.G.S.P.F., Paris, France	France	1–0	11–0	Friendly	
27	13	6 November 1909	Anlaby Road, Hull, England	Sweden	6–0	7–0	Friendly	
28	14	11 December 1909	Stamford Bridge, Fullham, England	Netherlands	2-0	9–1	Friendly	
29	14	11 December 1909	Stamford Bridge, Fullham, England	Netherlands	3-0	9–1	Friendly	
30	14	11 December 1909	Stamford Bridge, Fullham, England	Netherlands	4-0	9–1	Friendly	
31	14	11 December 1909	Stamford Bridge, Fullham, England	Netherlands	5-0	9–1	Friendly	
32	14	11 December 1909	Stamford Bridge, Fullham, England	Netherlands	7-1	9–1	Friendly	
33	14	11 December 1909	Stamford Bridge, Fullham, England	Netherlands	8-1	9–1	Friendly	
34	15	4 March 1911	Crystal Palace Park, London, England	Belgium	4–0	4–0	Friendly	
35	17	25 May 1911	Spitalacker, Bern, Switzerland	Switzerland	1–0	4–1	Friendly	
36	19	16 March 1912	Anlaby Road, Hull, England	Netherlands	2-0	4–0	Friendly	
37	21	30 June 1912 (Note: The RSSSF credits Woodward with having scored two goals in this match; however, the official English report of the games agree he scored just one.)	Stockholms Olympiastadion, Stockholm, Sweden	Hungary	7–0	7–0	1912 Summer Olympics Quarter-finals	
38	22	2 July 1912	Stockholms Olympiastadion, Stockholm, Sweden	Finland	4–0	4–0	1912 Summer Olympics Semi-finals	
39	24	9 November 1912	County Ground, Swindon, England	Belgium	1-0	4–0	Friendly	
40	24	9 November 1912	County Ground, Swindon, England	Belgium	4-0	4–0	Friendly	
41	25	21 March 1913	Viktoria field, Berlin-Mariendorf, Germany	Germany	2–0	3–0	Friendly	
42	26	24 March 1913	HBS Craeyenhout, The Hague, Netherlands	Netherlands	1–1	1–2	Friendly	
43	27	15 November 1913	Anlaby Road, Hull, England	Netherlands	2–1	2–1	Friendly	
44	28	24 February 1914	Stade du Vivier d'Oie, Bruxelles, Belgium	Belgium	?	2–0	Friendly	
45	30	10 June 1914	Råsunda IP, Solna, Sweden	Sweden	2-0	5–1	Friendly	

=== England amateurs (non-official) ===
Scores and results of England amateur is listed first and the score column indicates the score after each Woodward goal.

No.	Date	Venue	Opponent	Score	Result	Competition	Ref
1	15 December 1906	Dalymount Park, Dublin, Ireland	Ireland	?	1–2	Friendly	
2	7 December 1907	White Hart Lane, London, England	Ireland	?	12–2	Friendly	
3	22 February 1908	Edgeley Park, Stockport, England	Wales	1–0	1–0	Friendly	
4	6 November 1909	Elland Road, Leeds, England	Ireland	?	4–4	Friendly	
5	19 February 1910	Leeds Road, Huddersfield, England	Wales	?	6–0	Friendly	
6	18 February 1911	Recreation Ground, Newtown	Wales	?	5–1	Friendly	
7	18 February 1911	Recreation Ground, Newtown	Wales	?	5–1	Friendly	
8	18 November 1911	Leeds Road, Huddersfield, England	Ireland	?	2–0	Friendly	
9	7 February 1914	Home Park, Plymouth, England	Wales	?	9–1	Friendly	
10	7 February 1914	Home Park, Plymouth, England	Wales	?	9–1	Friendly	
11	12 June 1914	Råsunda IP, Solna, Sweden	Sweden	?	5–0	Friendly	
12	12 June 1914	Råsunda IP, Solna, Sweden	Sweden	?	5–0	Friendly	

== See also ==
- List of men's footballers with 50 or more international goals

== Bibliography ==
- Jacobs, Norman (1 August 2005). Vivian Woodward: Football's Gentleman. NPI Media Group. ISBN 0-7524-3430-6.
- Soar, Phil (1995). Tottenham Hotspur The Official Illustrated History 1882–1995. Hamlyn. ISBN 0-600-58706-1.
- Goodwin, Bob (1992). The Spurs Alphabet. ACL & Polar Publishing (UK) Ltd. ISBN 0-9514862-8-4.
