= Matt Paterson (footballer, born 1888) =

Scottish footballer

Personal information
- Full name: Matthew Berry Paterson
- Date of birth: 19 March 1888
- Place of birth: Douglas, Scotland
- Date of death: 1974 (aged 85–86)
- Place of death: Edinburgh, Scotland
- Position: Centre-half

Senior career*
Years	Team	Apps	(Gls)
–1908	Bellshill Athletic		
1908–1923	Hibernian	413	(36)
1923–1924	St Bernard's	25	(0)
- * Club domestic league appearances and goals

Matthew Berry Paterson (19 March 1888 – 1974) was a Scottish professional footballer who played as a centre half, most notably for Hibernian. He made over 410 Scottish League appearances, played in the 1914 Scottish Cup Final, captained the club and was one of its longest-serving players.

== Personal life ==
Paterson served in the Royal Artillery during the First World War.

== Career statistics ==
Appearances and goals by club, season and competition
Club	Season	League			Scottish Cup		Total	
Club	Season	Division	Apps	Goals	Apps	Goals	Apps	Goals
Hibernian	1908–09	Scottish First Division	32	2	2	1	34	3
Hibernian	1909–10	Scottish First Division	29	3	7	0	36	3
Hibernian	1910–11	Scottish First Division	33	17	1	0	34	17
Hibernian	1911–12	Scottish First Division	28	2	3	0	31	2
Hibernian	1912–13	Scottish First Division	29	1	3	0	32	1
Hibernian	1913–14	Scottish First Division	31	2	7	1	38	3
Hibernian	1914–15	Scottish First Division	38	1	—		38	1
Hibernian	1915–16	Scottish First Division	38	0	—		38	0
Hibernian	1916–17	Scottish First Division	32	2	—		32	2
Hibernian	1917–18	Scottish First Division	23	0	—		23	0
Hibernian	1918–19	Scottish First Division	13	0	—		13	0
Hibernian	1919–20	Scottish First Division	27	1	3	0	30	1
Hibernian	1920–21	Scottish First Division	32	1	6	0	38	1
Hibernian	1921–22	Scottish First Division	23	3	0	0	23	3
Hibernian	1922–23	Scottish First Division	5	1	0	0	5	1
Hibernian	Total		413	36	32	2	445	38
St Bernard's	1923–24	Scottish Second Division	25	0	6	0	31	0
Career total			438	36	38	2	476	38

== Honours ==
Hibernian

- East of Scotland Shield: 1908–09, 1920–21
- Wilson Cup: 1908–09, 1912–13, 1915–16, 1916–17, 1920–21
- Rosebery Charity Cup: 1912–13, 1917–18
