= Bob Whittingham =

English footballer (1888–1926)

Personal information
- Full name: Robert Whittingham
- Date of birth: 1888
- Place of birth: Goldenhill, Staffordshire
- Date of death: 9 June 1926 (aged 37)
- Place of death: Goldenhill, Stoke-on-Trent, England
- Height: 5 ft 8 in (1.73 m)
- Position: Inside forward

Youth career
- Goldenhill Wanderers

Senior career*
Years	Team	Apps	(Gls)
1904	Stoke	0	(0)
- Crewe Alexandra
1907–1909	Blackpool	53	(28)
1909–1910	Bradford City	45	(31)
1910–1913	Chelsea	113	(70)
- South Shields
1919	Chelsea	6	(1)
1919–1920	Stoke	18	(8)
1921–1922	Macclesfield	10	(2)
- Scunthorpe & Lindsey United
1923	Wrexham	0	(0)
- Goldenhill Wanderers
Total		245+	(140+)

International career
- The Football League XI
- * Club domestic league appearances and goals

Robert Whittingham (1888 – 9 June 1926) was an English footballer who played as an inside-forward for various clubs, mainly before the First World War. He played in the Football League for Stoke, Blackpool, Bradford City, and Chelsea. He helped Chelsea to win promotion out of the Second Division in 1911–12. He was the younger brother of fellow footballer Sam Whittingham.

== Career ==
Whittingham started with amateur side Goldenhill Wanderers as an inside-forward before signing for Stoke (without making a first-team appearance) and later Crewe Alexandra.

He later moved on to Blackpool, where he stayed for just a year. He scored 28 goals in 53 league games, becoming the club's top goalscorer over two terms (he achieved the feat in the latter season despite his leaving Bloomfield Road midway through the campaign). In January 1909, he joined First Division side Bradford City and scored 11 goals in nine games to save the "Bantams" from relegation at the expense of Manchester City. He then equalled a then-club-record 21 league goals during the 1909–10 season. His performances at Valley Parade earned him a move to David Calderhead's relegation-threatened Chelsea in April 1910 – for a fee of £1,300.

Whittingham arrived too late to save the club from relegation into the Second Division. Still, he scored prolifically during the next two seasons, hitting 30 goals in his first full season with Chelsea. However, they narrowly missed out on promotion, finishing third. His 26 goals in 1911–12, almost half of the club's season total, played a big part in their winning promotion back to the First Division. He scored 12 goals in 1912–13 to become the club's top-scorer for a third consecutive season. He left Stamford Bridge in 1913 and had a stint with South Shields before the First World War broke out.

During the war he guested for Stoke, where he became a prolific scorer hitting 26 in 1915–16, 22 in 1916–17, 15 in 1917–18 and 23 in 1918–19. He also guested for Fulham and Port Vale. He made an appearance for the Football League XI in February 1919 against the Scottish League at St Andrew's, Birmingham, in the first representative match played after the First World War, and scored the second goal in a 3–1 win; according to the Daily Express reporter, "the pick" of the English XI were Whittingham, Billy Morgan, and Joe Clennell. He returned to Chelsea after the war, playing six more games in the 1919–20 season, finishing his time with the club with a record of 80 goals from 129 league and FA Cup games. He then moved to Stoke again for a £500 fee, where he scored eight goals in 18 Second Division games in another brief spell at the Victoria Ground. His goal tally included one against rivals Port Vale in a 3–0 win at the Old Recreation Ground. However, he struggled with an ankle injury, and ill health forced his retirement in April 1920. Stoke gave him a benefit match in October 1920.

Whittingham joined Cheshire County League side Macclesfield at the start of the 1921–22 season but struggled with his fitness and moved on to Scunthorpe United in February 1922. He later played for Wrexham before returning to Goldenhill Wanderers. Despite his prolific goalscoring record, Whittingham was never capped for England, though he did feature in a Victory international against Wales at the Victoria Ground on 18 October 1919.

== Style of play ==
Whittingham weighed in at 12 stone (170 lb; 76 kg) despite standing at just 5 ft 8 in (1.73 m) tall, making him a menace to opposing goalkeepers. He specialised in sending in powerful long-range efforts from outside the penalty area.

== Career statistics ==
Appearances and goals by club, season and competition
Club	Season	League			FA Cup		Total	
Club	Season	Division	Apps	Goals	Apps	Goals	Apps	Goals
Blackpool	1907–08	Second Division	31	15	0	0	31	15
Blackpool	1908–09	Second Division	22	13	0	0	22	13
Blackpool	Total		53	28	0	0	53	28
Bradford City	1908–09	First Division	17	10	2	0	19	10
Bradford City	1909–10	First Division	28	21	2	0	30	21
Bradford City	Total		45	31	4	0	49	31
Chelsea	1909–10	First Division	3	1	0	0	3	1
Chelsea	1910–11	Second Division	38	30	5	5	43	35
Chelsea	1911–12	Second Division	32	26	2	0	34	26
Chelsea	1912–13	First Division	20	7	3	5	23	12
Chelsea	1913–14	First Division	20	6	0	0	20	6
Chelsea	1919–20	First Division	6	1	0	0	6	1
Chelsea	Total		119	71	10	10	129	81
Stoke	1919–20	Second Division	18	8	0	0	18	8
Macclesfield	1921–22	Cheshire League	10	2	1	0	11	2
Wrexham	1922–23	Third Division North	0	0	0	0	0	0
Career total			245	140	15	10	260	150

== Honours ==
Chelsea

- Football League Second Division second-place promotion: 1911–12
