= 1908–09 British Home Championship =

Tournament details
- Host country: England, Ireland, Scotland and Wales
- Dates: 13 February – 3 April 1909
- Teams: 4

Final positions
- Champions: England (16th title)
- Runners-up: Wales

Tournament statistics
- Matches played: 6
- Goals scored: 23 (3.83 per match)
- Top scorer: 7 Players (2 goals)

The 1908–09 British Home Championship was an international football tournament between the British Home Nations. England dominated the competition with three wins over their opponents. When placed in the context of their overseas tours to Europe in 1908 and 1909, this made a run of ten victories for the English side led by prolific goalscorer Vivian Woodward. Wales, who were enjoying one of their most successful periods of international football, came second with two victories and Scotland finished third. Ireland finished last with no points and only two goals.

England and Ireland began the tournament with England starting well, scoring four without reply. Wales and Scotland began their competition in March, the Welsh winning a close game in Wrexham 3–2. Scotland's response was a 5–0 thumping of the Irish in a strong display of goalscoring ability. England reaffirmed their position as favourites with a 2–0 win over Wales before Wales too made a final push for the title, becoming the only team in this edition of the tournament to win a match away, beating Ireland 3–2 in Belfast. In the final game, England needed only a draw to win the championship undisputed. In the event they did better, scoring twice against Scotland without reply to take the title.

== Table ==
Team	Pld	W	D	L	GF	GA	GD	Pts
England (C)	3	3	0	0	8	0	+8	6
Wales	3	2	0	1	6	6	0	4
Scotland	3	1	0	2	7	5	+2	2
Ireland	3	0	0	3	2	12	−10	0

Rules for classification: 1) points. The points system worked as follows: 2 points for a win and 1 point for a draw.
(C) Champions

== Results ==
13 February 1909

England	4–0	Ireland
Woodward 60', 80'; Hilsdon 50', 87' (pen.)

Park Avenue, Bradford
Attendance: 28,000
Referee: James Stark (Scotland)

1 March 1909

Wales	3–2	Scotland
Davies 23', 39'; L. Jones 26'		Walker 70'; Paul 73'

Racecourse Ground, Wrexham
Attendance: 6,000
Referee: Thomas P. Campbell (England)

15 March 1909

Scotland	5–0	Ireland
McMenemy 15', 77'; MacFarlane 20'; Thomson 48'; Paul 84'

Ibrox Park, Glasgow
Attendance: 24,000
Referee: James Mason (England)

15 March 1909

England	2–0	Wales
Holley 15'; Freeman 42'

City Ground, Nottingham
Attendance: 11,500
Referee: David Philp (Scotland)

20 March 1909

Ireland	2–3	Wales
Lacey 30'; Hunter 75'		L. Jones 42'; Wynn 62'; Meredith 67'

Grosvenor Park, Belfast
Attendance: 8,000
Referee: James B. Stark (Scotland)

3 April 1909

England	2–0	Scotland
Wall 3', 10'

The Crystal Palace, London
Attendance: 23,667
Referee: James B. Stark (Scotland)

== Winning squad ==
- England

Name	Apps/Goals by opponent			Total	
Name	(Wales) WAL	(Ireland) IRE	(Scotland) SCO	Apps	Goals
Bob Crompton	1	1	1	3	0
Sam Hardy	1	1	1	3	0
Ben Warren	1	1	1	3	0
William Wedlock	1	1	1	3	0
Vivian Woodward	1	1/2		2	2
Bert Freeman	1/1		1	2	1
George Holley	1/1		1	2	1
Evelyn Lintott		1	1	2	0
Jesse Pennington	1		1	2	0
Fred Pentland	1		1	2	0
Arthur Bridgett	1	1		2	0
George Wall			1/2	1	2
George Hilsdon		1/2		1	2
Harold Fleming			1	1	0
Colin Veitch	1			1	0
Arthur Berry		1		1	0
Joe Cottle		1		1	0
James Windridge		1		1	0
