= John Gordon (Scottish footballer) =

Scottish footballer

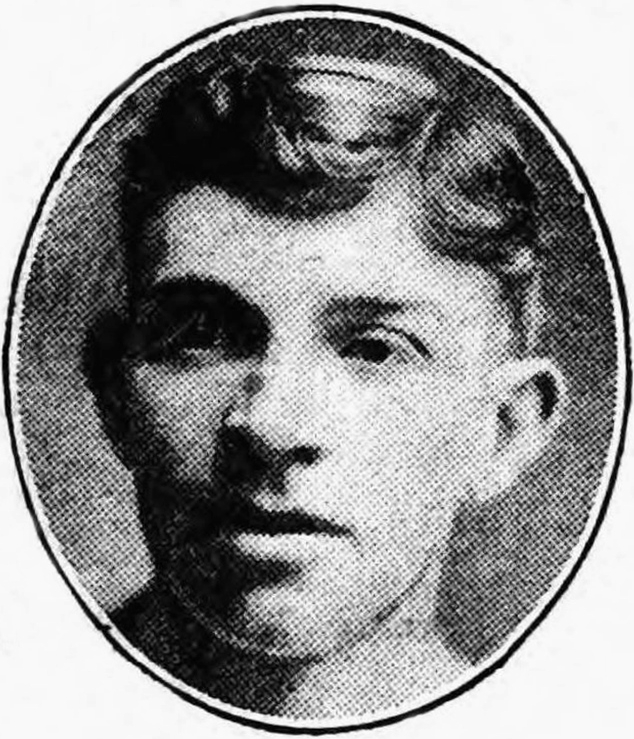
- Gordon while with Coventry City in 1910

Personal information
- Full name: John Gordon
- Date of birth: 12 January 1886
- Place of birth: Arbroath, Scotland
- Date of death: 1971 (aged 84–85)
- Place of death: Leith, Scotland
- Position: Centre half

Senior career*
Years	Team	Apps	(Gls)
1904–1906	Arbroath		
1906–1908	Hibernian	31	(0)
1908–1909	Brentford	3	(0)
1909–1910	Leith Athletic	22	(2)
1910–1911	Coventry City	11	(0)
1911–1912	Bathgate		
–1920	Bonnyrigg Rose Athletic		
1920–1922	Hibernian	5	(1)
1922	St Bernard's	7	(2)
1922–	Leeds United	0	(0)
–1924	Loanhead Mayflower		
1924	Forfar Athletic	6	(2)
- * Club domestic league appearances and goals

John Gordon (12 January 1886 – 1971) was a Scottish professional footballer who played in the Scottish League for Hibernian, Leith Athletic, St Bernard's and Forfar Athletic as a centre half. He also played in the Southern League for Brentford and Coventry City.

== Career statistics ==
Appearances and goals by club, season and competition
Club	Season	League			National Cup		Total	
Club	Season	Division	Apps	Goals	Apps	Goals	Apps	Goals
Hibernian	1906–07	Scottish League First Division	14	0	7	0	21	0
Hibernian	1907–08	Scottish League First Division	17	0	1	0	18	0
Hibernian	Total		31	0	8	0	39	0
Brentford	1908–09	Southern League First Division	3	0	0	0	3	0
Leith Athletic	1909–10	Scottish League Second Division	22	2	10	0	32	2
Coventry City	1910–11	Southern League First Division	11	0	0	0	11	0
Hibernian	1920–21	Scottish League First Division	4	1	0	0	4	1
Hibernian	1921–22	Scottish League First Division	1	0	0	0	1	0
Hibernian	Total		36	1	8	0	44	1
St Bernard's	1922–23	Scottish League Second Division	7	2	0	0	7	2
Forfar Athletic	1923–24	Scottish League Second Division	6	2	2	2	8	4
Career total			85	5	20	2	105	7
