= 1907–08 Chelsea F.C. season =

English football club season

Chelsea
1907–08 season
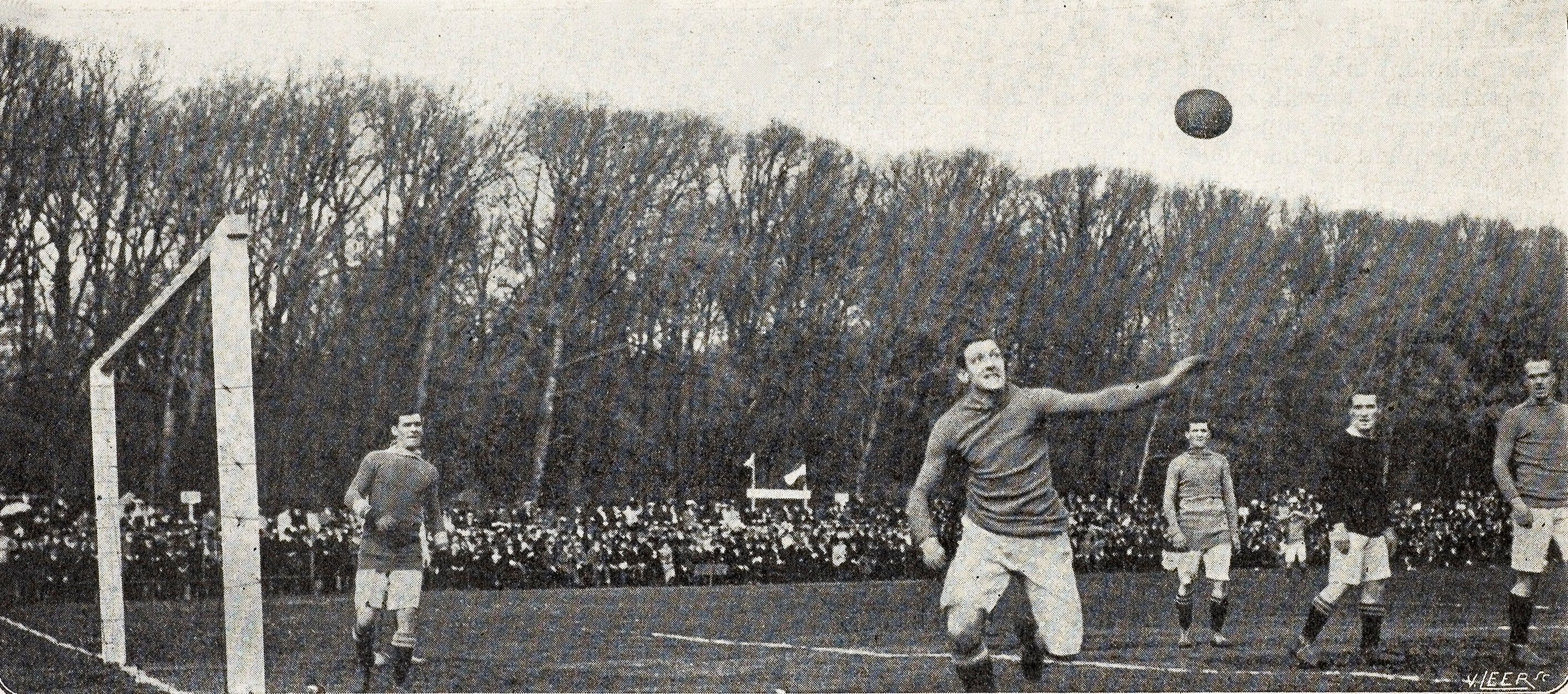
- Chelsea against Everton on 3 May 1908
- Owner: Gus Mears
- Chairman: Claude Kirby
- Manager: David Calderhead
- Stadium: Stamford Bridge
- First Division: 13th
- FA Cup: Second round
- Top goalscorer: League: George Hilsdon (24); All: George Hilsdon (30)
- Highest home attendance: 55,000 vs Woolwich Arsenal (9 November 1907)
- Lowest home attendance: 18,000 vs Blackburn Rovers (2 December 1907)
- Average home league attendance: 32,895
- Biggest win: 9–1 v Worksop Town (11 January 1908)
- Biggest defeat: 0–6 v Nottingham Forest (21 September 1907)
Home colours	Away colours

The 1907–08 season was Chelsea Football Club's third competitive season and third year in existence. The club played their first ever season in the top-flight, finishing 13th.

== Table ==
Pos	Team	Pld	W	D	L	GF	GA	GAv	Pts	Relegation
1	Manchester United (C)	38	23	6	9	81	48	1.688	52	
2	Aston Villa	38	17	9	12	77	59	1.305	43	
3	Manchester City	38	16	11	11	62	54	1.148	43	
4	Newcastle United	38	15	12	11	65	54	1.204	42	
5	The Wednesday	38	19	4	15	73	64	1.141	42	
6	Middlesbrough	38	17	7	14	54	45	1.200	41	
7	Bury	38	14	11	13	58	61	0.951	39	
8	Liverpool	38	16	6	16	68	61	1.115	38	
9	Nottingham Forest	38	13	11	14	59	62	0.952	37	
10	Bristol City	38	12	12	14	58	61	0.951	36	
11	Everton	38	15	6	17	58	64	0.906	36	
12	Preston North End	38	12	12	14	47	53	0.887	36	
13	Chelsea	38	14	8	16	53	62	0.855	36	
14	Blackburn Rovers	38	12	12	14	51	63	0.810	36	
15	Woolwich Arsenal	38	12	12	14	51	63	0.810	36	
16	Sunderland	38	16	3	19	78	75	1.040	35	
17	Sheffield United	38	12	11	15	52	58	0.897	35	
18	Notts County	38	13	8	17	39	51	0.765	34	
19	Bolton Wanderers (R)	38	14	5	19	52	58	0.897	33	Relegation to the Second Division
20	Birmingham (R)	38	9	12	17	40	60	0.667	30	Relegation to the Second Division

Source: World Football
Rules for classification: 1) Points; 2) Goal average; 3) Goals scored
(C) Champions; (R) Relegated
