= 1908–09 Dumbarton F.C. season =

Dumbarton
1908–1909 season
- Stadium: Boghead Park, Dumbarton
- Scottish League Division Two: 4th
- Top goalscorer: League: William Greer (11); All: Johnny Hill (15)
Home colours

The 1908–09 season was the 32nd Scottish football season in which Dumbarton competed at national level, entering the Scottish Football League and the Scottish Qualifying Cup. In addition Dumbarton played in the Dumbartonshire Cup.

== Story of the Season ==
=== August ===
As a season opener a charity match was played on 8 August with the ‘Probables’ taking on the ‘Impropables’. The result left the selection committee with a bit of a headache as the ‘Improbables’ won 4–0. However the team showed little change from the previous season, with the only departure being Bob McLean to Vale of Leven, while full back John O’Neill (ex Clydebank) and forward William Greer (ex Clyde) were signed up.

On 15 August Dumbarton travelled to Kirkcaldy to play last season's champions Raith Rovers in their first league fixture. The team lined up with two trialists as follows: Blair (goal); McCulloch and O’Neill (full backs); Taylor, Gordon and Kane (half backs) and Chalk (East Stirling), Greer, Maginnes (Morton), Teasdale and Hill (forwards). The home side began strongly and the Sons defence was tested on a number of occasions but half time was reached without a goal being scored. Raith's pressure told early in the second half with a goal but Hill came to Dumbarton's rescue in the dying minutes to score the equaliser.

The following week the opening league tie of the season at Boghead was played against East Stirling. Two changes were made to the team and in place of last week's trialists, Brander came in at centre forward as well as returnee George Galbraith on the right wing. The Sons were rarely troubled and were quickly two goals ahead followed by a third early in the second half. While the Shire scored a consolation, Hill scored the fourth for a comprehensive win.

An unchanged squad travelled to Edinburgh to play St Bernards on 29 August in the league. The game was an end to end encounter with each side notching a goal in the first half. After the interval however St Bernards moved up a gear and added two more goals to their total. Dumbarton came back with a second and could have equalised had Hill scored from the penalty spot. The Saints however made no mistake when they were awarded a penalty and the game finished 4–2.

=== September ===
On 5 September Dumbarton entertained Renton in the first round of the Qualifying Cup at Boghead. A couple of changes were made to the team with Charles O’Neill coming in at right half in place of Taylor and Nisbet replacing Gillespie on the right wing. In the game Dumbarton were never seriously challenged and won by 4–1. Renton were however handicapped by the loss of one of their forwards 15 minutes into the second half.

The following week it was back to league business and neighbours Vale of Leven were the visitors. The only change to the team was the return of Taylor in the half back line. Vale were as yet unbeaten this season but found the Sons in superb form with Greer scoring a brace and Hill the other in a 3–1 win.

Dumbarton had the fortune of another home tie in the Qualifying Cup second round on 19 September against Johnstone. The team showed a single change with Thomson coming in at centre half in place of Kane. In the first half the play was equal and only an own goal on the stroke of half time gave the Sons the lead. Johnstone were to lose a player to injury early in the second half and Dumbarton took advantage with Hill scoring a hat trick to make the final result 4–1.

On 26 September Dumbarton travelled to Coatbridge to play Albion Rovers in the league. The team was back to full strength as Kane returned in his usual place. The Sons continued their confident showings of late and with Greer notching another brace (his 10th in 7 games) the winning score of 4–2 did not flatter. The only negative note was that McCulloch together with one of the Rovers players were ordered off for an altercation.

So as September ended Dumbarton held 2nd place in the league with 7 points from the 5 games played so far, a point behind Vale of Leven but with a game in hand.

=== October ===
October opened with an away tie in the third round of the Qualifying Cup against Ayr Parkhouse. With Ritchie replacing the suspended McCulloch at right back in an otherwise unchanged side, Dumbarton entered the match as strong favourites to advance to the next round but it was the home side that came out strongly while at the same time snuffing out any attempts by the Sons forward line. A goal in each half gave Parkhouse a worthy 2–0 win, with Dumbarton's closest effort being a missed penalty late in the match.

On 10 October Dumbarton played Leith Athletic at Boghead in their first league encounter. William Monteith, signed from Beith, made his debut in goal, while Michael Cannon (ex East Stirling) trialled at outside right. Taylor was rested with Ritchie moving to the half back line and Thomson taking the right back spot. Dumbarton had the bulk of the play and should have had more to show than just a single goal at half time. The second half was a repeat but the Leith keeper was in unbeatable form and in the end the Sons were made to pay for their missed chances as Leith scored a late goal for a 1–1 draw.

The following week Arthurlie came to Boghead on league business. McCulloch returned from suspension and Charles O’Neill replaced Gordon. In addition new signing Robert Walker (ex Maryhill) was played on the right wing. On the day the new boy showed his worth by scoring the first goal with Greer scoring the other in a comfortable 2–0 win. This result saw Dumbarton take top spot in the league for the first time this season.

On 24 October the league match against Abercorn was played at Paisley. Blair returned in goal as did Gordon at right half. Throughout the game the play was closely contested and a penalty converted by Abercorn was the only goal separating the teams at half time. In the second half the play became rough, with Brander being ordered off but there was no more scoring. Subsequently, Brander was suspended for 2 months whilst the Dumbarton linesman at the game, Mr Forgie, was suspended for the rest of the season.

On the last day of the month Dumbarton were again on their travels, this time to play Ayr in the league. Monteith returned as keeper and Taylor came in for the suspended Ritchie. In addition James Walker (Clyde) took over Brander's place at inside right. The Sons started strongly but all their attacks were foiled by the Ayr defence. Then on the stroke of half time Ayr scored the first goal. A second minutes into the second half brought the contest to an end as three further goals contributed to a 5–0 rout.

The result saw Dumbarton drop to 4th in the league table with 10 points from the 9 games played – 3 points behind leaders Raith Rovers but with a game in hand.

=== November ===
On 7 November Albion Rovers visited Boghead to play their return league fixture. Gillespie took Walker's place in the front line, while McCulloch moved to right half in place of the injured Taylor, with Thomson taking the right back spot. In addition Fraser came back in as keeper. The Sons had got the better of the Rovers at Coatbridge in September and in the first half their play suggested that they were looking for a repeat. Unfortunately the opposing keeper was in superb form and against the run of play Albion scored just before the interval. This deflated the Sons and in the second half the Rovers scored another two before Teasdale scored a late consolation goal in a 3–1 defeat.

The following week saw the start of the county cup competition with a visit to Tontine Park to play Renton. The team showed a number of changes with McCulloch and Thomson switching positions, James Walker coming back in place of Gillespie and Hill rested with Taylor slotting in at inside left. The changes however did not have the desired effect as the Sons slumped to their fourth consecutive defeat by tamely losing 0–3.

Cowdenbeath were the opponents at Boghead in the league on 21 November. The defence reverted to that which started the season with Blair returning at keeper. In addition Ewart Kinnon (Mossfield Amateurs) was tried out at inside right. On a poor pitch the players struggled to show any skill but Dumbarton's defence was much improved while only bad luck stopped the Dumbarton front line scoring – the game ending 0–0. At the same time Manchester City were interested in signing Hill but baulked at the fee requested.

Another home game was played on 28 November, this time against St Bernards in the league. Thomson replaced McCulloch in the back line while Gordon came in at inside right. In an exciting game on a muddy pitch Taylor notched the all-important goal in a 1–0 victory to bring the winless run to an end.

So as November came to an end Dumbarton maintained 4th place with 13 points from 12 games, 3 points behind leaders Raith Rovers with a game less played.

=== December ===
Following a postponed match against Arthurlie, Dumbarton welcomed Abercorn to Boghead in the league on 12 December. Ritchie missed his train and so Gordon took his place at left half while James Walker stepped into the inside right spot. The game saw the Sons press for the mostpart but in the end had to settle for a Robert Walker goal to take both points. It was not however all good news as leading goalscorer William Greer was snapped up by Queens Park Rangers.

The following week Dumbarton travelled to Edinburgh to play Leith Athletic in the league. With the departure of Greer, Gordon took the centre forward spot and Ritchie returned in the half back line. Unfortunately it was an off day for the Sons forwards as Leith even had the luxury of missing a penalty for a 2–0 win.

On Boxing Day Dumbarton hosted league leaders Raith Rovers. Hill moved from the wing to play centre forward while Gordon took James Walker's place at inside right. In addition new signing William Blair (ex Renfrew Victoria) played on the left wing. Dumbarton dominated the first half of the game but failed to break down the Raith defence. This continued in the second half but it was Raith who scored with 15 minutes to play. However Hill with a brace spared the Sons blushes and snatched both points.

On New Year's Eve Dumbarton played Lennox Amateurs at Boghead in the second game of the county championship. The game went as expected with the Sons handing out a 5–1 thrashing.

1908 ended with Dumbarton improving their league placing to 3rd with 17 points from 15 games, 6 points behind Raith but with 2 games in hand.

=== January ===
On 2 January Dumbarton travelled to Cowdenbeath to play the return league fixture. The Sons played new signing John Lipton (ex Shettleston) at centre half. Despite playing the better it was Cowdenbeath who found their way to the goal and were two up by half time. However Dumbarton continued to pressure the Fifers defence and a penalty kick converted by Taylor brought them back into the game, Then in the last minute Robert Walker scored an equaliser for a vital point.

Two days later, Dumbarton made the short journey to play Dumbarton Harp in the county cup. O’Neill came in at right back and Brander returned from his long suspension at inside right. In a tight tussle Hill scored both goals in a 2–1 win.

On 9 January Ayr Parkhouse were the visitors on league business. Parkhouse got off to a good start and scored first but despite continuing to push forward Kane managed an equaliser for the Sons just before half time. In the second half however Dumbarton's form improved and goals from Brander and Hill put the tie beyond doubt. The Parkies managed a second goal but it was not enough and the Sons took the game 3–2 and the two points.

After a free week Dumbarton travelled to Arthurlie to play the return league fixture. New signing James White (ex Barrhead Auburn Victoria) was played at inside left. The game itself was a poor one from the Sons perspective as the forwards hardly tested the Arthurlie keeper, and in the end the home team won comfortably 2–0.

On 30 January Dumbarton played their return league fixture against Ayr at Boghead. McCulloch took injured Thomson's place in the back line while Nisbet replaced Brander at inside right. The Sons were ahead within six minutes from a Hill strike and that is how matters stood at half time. The second half began with Dumbarton putting on another two goals while Ayr replied with two of their own. Hill scored a fourth for the Sons and although Ayr scored a third the result at the end was a 4–3 victory for the home side.

So at the end of January Dumbarton still held 3rd place in the league with 22 points from 19 games – 4 points behind Abercorn.

=== February ===
On 6 February it was a county cup tie against Renton at Boghead. Taylor and Brander returned to the team. Most of the action in the game came in the first 15 minutes as first Teasdale opened for Dumbarton and almost immediately thereafter Renton equalised. The visitors had the better of the game for the time remaining but no further goals were scored – the result being a 1–1 draw.

A week later Dumbarton travelled to neighbours Vale of Leven in their return league fixture. McCulloch replaced Taylor at right back. In a tough game it was the Sons who had the better of things early on and Hill scored the opener. Despite a number of other chances the score remained unchanged. Vale tried hard for the equaliser but were handicapped by a sending off midway through the second half. In the end Dumbarton held out for a 1–0 win.

On 20 February Dumbarton travelled to Falkirk to play their penultimate league fixture against East Stirling. An unchanged side took the field and while neither side had any title aspirations a close game was played out. On the day the Sons had a disappointing day and although the only goal was scored in 6 minutes by the ‘Shire they had a number of opportunities to increase that.

=== March ===
After two free weeks Dumbarton returned to county cup competition with the return fixture against Dumbarton Harp at Boghead on 13 March. With Matt Teasdale having left to start work in China, his position was taken by the return of William Blair. The Harp were always second best during the game with Dumbarton scoring twice through Hill and Brander in the first half – and Taylor also missed a penalty kick. Hill completed his hat trick in the second half to finish the game 4–0 – though Harp were reduced to 9 men with a sending off and an injury.

A week later it was another county cup fixture, this time against Lennox at St James Park. Thomson was the only change to the team, taking McCulloch's place in the back line. With two goals in each half, Hill adding another two to his season's total, Dumbarton coasted to a 4–0 win.

The final league fixture of the season was played on 27 March against Ayr Parkhouse ay Ayr. The Sons reverted to the team that had turned out against Harp two weeks earlier. Brander opened the scoring for Dumbarton but the Parkies equalised before half time. The home side continued to press in the second half and in the absence of Blair who retired injured they went ahead. However the Sons got the leveller within 5 minutes and the game ended 2–2.

So as March ended, Dumbarton had finished their league campaign in 4th place with 25 points from 22 games played – although a number of teams could push them further down once they complete their respective programmes. Abercorn topped the table with 31 points from 22 games but similarly Vale of Leven could catch them being 5 points behind but with 4 games left to play.

=== April ===
On 3 April Dumbarton played the home leg of their county cup matches against Vale of Leven. Gillespie took William Blair's place in the forward line. In miserable conditions it was the Vale who started the stronger and opened the scoring after 30 minutes. Both teams had chances thereafter but Lipton scored just on full time to make the final score 1–1.

The following Saturday Dumbarton entertained Motherwell in a friendly. The Sons tried out a number of new boys and in the first half competed well with their First Division opponents. The visitors scored after 30 minutes but in the second half the stamina of the Motherwell men showed as they scored two further goals without reply.

A midweek game was played on 13 April against Vale of Leven at Millburn Park to complete the qualifying series of games for the county championship. John McNee (ex Shettleston), who had impressed in the Motherwell friendly and was signed up, took Gillespie's place at inside left. The match was a disappointment for the Sons who lost 3–0 for the second game running.

A further friendly match was played at Ochilview against Stenhousemuir on 17 April. Again some new faces were given try outs and while half time was reached goalless, in the second half Hill (2) and Brander scored the goals in a 3–0 win.

Dumbarton and Dumbarton Harp met at Boghead on 26 April in a play off to decide who would play against Renton in the final of the county cup. New signing William Gibson (ex Yoker Athletic) took his place at centre forward, and duly scored in a 2–1 win.

So on 29 April, for the fourth successive season Dumbarton played in the final of the Dumbartonshire Cup. Another new signing David Hynds (ex Shettleston) was played at right half. However, in a close contest it was Renton who would retain their grip on the trophy winning 1–0.

=== May ===
Dumbarton finished the season with 4th place in the league – the championship title being taken by Abercorn. On 31 May at the annual meeting of the Scottish League Dumbarton together with Raith Rovers applied for promotion to the First Division, but for the third year in succession, it was the bottom two First Division clubs – Morton and Partick Thistle – that maintained their' top flight' status in the relevant elections. A motion by Raith Rovers for automatic promotion attracted no support.

== Match results ==
=== Scottish League ===
15 August 1908 Scottish League	Raith Rovers	1–1	Dumbarton	Starks Park
	Axford		Hill	Attendance: 4,000; Referee: J Murray

22 August 1908 Scottish League	Dumbarton	4–1	E Stirling	Boghead Park
	Greer 10', 35', 55'; Hill 76'		Robertson 75'	Attendance: 3,000; Referee: H Lorimer

29 August 1908 Scottish League	St Bernard's	4–2	Dumbarton	Royal Gymnasium Ground
	Simpson, J Black (pen.)		Greer	Attendance: 1,500; Referee: D MacPherson

12 September 1908 Scottish League	Dumbarton	3–1	Vale of Leven	Boghead Park
	Greer 30'; Hill 75'		Kidd 89'	Attendance: 4,500; Referee: J Stark

26 September 1908 Scottish League	Albion Rovers	2–4	Dumbarton	Meadow Park, Coatbridge
	Farr 44', 50'		Hutcheson 30' (o.g.); Greer 35'; Teasdale	Referee: Mr Feggans

10 October 1908 Scottish League	Dumbarton	1–1	Leith Athletic	Boghead Park
	Greer 30'		Colombo	Attendance: 3,000; Referee: J Murray

17 October 1908 Scottish League	Dumbarton	2–0	Arthurlie	Boghead Park
	Walker; Greer			Attendance: 2,000; Referee: Mr Fegans

24 October 1908 Scottish League	Abercorn	1–0	Dumbarton	Old Ralston Park
	Crossan 20' (pen.)			Attendance: 3,000; Referee: Mr Rennie

31 October 1908 Scottish League	Ayr	5–0	Dumbarton	Somerset Park
	Mason 40'; McLean 47'; Anderson; Ward

7 November 1908 Scottish League	Dumbarton	1–3	Albion Rovers	Boghead Park
	Teasdale		Farr; Lindsay 70'	Referee: Mr Philip

21 November 1908 Scottish League	Dumbarton	0–0	Cowdenbeath	Boghead Park

28 November 1908 Scottish League	Dumbarton	1–0	St Bernard's	Boghead Park
	Taylor

12 December 1908 Scottish League	Dumbarton	1–0	Abercorn	Boghead Park
	Walker 30'			Attendance: 2,000; Referee: Mr McInnes

19 December 1908 Scottish League	Leith Athletic	2–0	Dumbarton	Old Logie Green
	Lindsay; Smail			Referee: J Montgomerie

26 December 1908 Scottish League	Dumbarton	2–1	Raith Rovers	Boghead Park
	Hill 90'		McAinsh	Attendance: 1,500; Referee: J Rennie

2 January 1909 Scottish League	Cowdenbeath	2–2	Dumbarton	North End Park, Cowdenbeath
	Goal		Taylor; Walker (pen.)

9 January 1909 Scottish League	Dumbarton	3–2	Ayr Parkhouse	Boghead Park
	Kane 45'; Hill 75'; Brander		Goodwin	Attendance: 2,000; Referee: W McInnes

23 January 1909 Scottish League	Arthurlie	2–0	Dumbarton	Dunterlie Park (1906–1919)
	Allan (pen.); Logan			Referee: Mr Edwards

30 January 1909 Scottish League	Dumbarton	4–3	Ayr	Boghead Park
	Hill; Teasdale		Muir

13 February 1909 Scottish League	Vale of Leven	0–1	Dumbarton	Millburn Park
			Hill	Referee: T Dougary

20 February 1909 Scottish League	E Stirling	1–0	Dumbarton	Merchiston Park
	Cram 6'			Attendance: 1,500; Referee: T McKnight

27 March 1909 Scottish League	Ayr Parkhouse	2–2	Dumbarton	Beresford Park
	Phillips		Brander; Nisbet	Attendance: 2,000

=== Scottish Qualifying Cup ===
5 September 1908 QualifyCup R1	Dumbarton	4–1	Renton	Boghead Park
	Hill; Greer; Brander		Smith	Attendance: 4,000

19 September 1908 QualifyCup R2	Dumbarton	4–1	Johnstone	Boghead Park
	Frame 45' (o.g.); Hill 65'		Frame	Attendance: 3,000; Referee: J Adams

3 October 1908 QualifyCup R3	Dumbarton	0–2	Ayr Parkhouse	Boghead Park
			Goodwin 40'; Phillips 68'	Attendance: 4,000; Referee: J Deans

=== Scottish Consolation Cup ===
ConsolCup R1	Dumbarton	scratched	Lennox

=== Dumbartonshire Cup ===
14 November 1908 League	Renton	3–0	Dumbarton	Tontine Park
	Smith 30'; Miller			Attendance: 2,000; Referee: T McKnight

31 December 1908 League	Dumbarton	5–1	Lennox	Boghead Park
	Goal		Goal	Attendance: 1,000

4 January 1909 League	Dumbarton Harp	1–2	Dumbarton	St James' Park, Dumbarton
	Goal		Hill	Attendance: 2,000

6 February 1909 League	Dumbarton	1–1	Renton	Boghead Park
	Teasdale 12'		Crawford 15'	Attendance: 2,000; Referee: R Kelso

13 March 1909 League	Dumbarton	4–0	Dumbarton Harp	Boghead Park
	Brander; Hill			Attendance: 2,000

20 March 1909 League	Lennox	0–4	Dumbarton	St James' Park, Dumbarton
			Walker 30'; Gordon; Hill	Attendance: 1,500

3 April 1909 League	Dumbarton	1–1	Vale of Leven	Boghead Park
	Lipton 89'		Gardner 30'

15 April 1909 League	Vale of Leven	3–0	Dumbarton	Millburn Park
	Robertson; Carr; McCallum			Attendance: 2,000

24 April 1909 PlayOff	Dumbarton	2–1	Dumbarton Harp	Boghead Park
	Gibson; Gordon		Goal

29 April 1909 Final	Dumbarton	0–1	Renton	Millburn Park
			Goal	Attendance: 3,000

==== Final league table ====
Pos	Team	Pld	W	D	L	GF	GA	GD	Pts
2	Raith Rovers	22	11	6	5	46	22	+24	28
2	Vale of Leven	22	12	4	6	38	25	+13	28
4	Dumbarton	22	10	5	7	34	34	0	25
5	Ayr	22	10	3	9	43	36	+7	23
5	Leith Athletic	22	10	3	9	37	33	+4	23

Source: statto.com
Rules for classification: Teams finish equal if level on points. Points system: 2 points for a win, 1 point for a draw, 0 points for a loss

=== Friendlies ===
10 April 1909 Friendly	Dumbarton	0–3	Motherwell	Boghead Park
			Hill 30'; Stewart; Johnstone	Attendance: 2,000; Referee: J Matthews

17 April 1909 Friendly	Dumbarton	3–0	Stenhousemuir	Boghead Park
	Hill; Brander			Attendance: 1,000; Referee: P Mitchell

== Player statistics ==
=== Squad ===
No.	Pos	Nat	Player	Total		Second Division		Qualifying Cup	
No.	Pos	Nat	Player	Apps	Goals	Apps	Goals	Apps	Goals
	GK	(Scotland) SCO	David Blair	21	0	18	0	3	0
	GK	(Scotland) SCO	Alexander Fraser	1	0	1	0	0	0
	GK	(Scotland) SCO	William Monteith	3	0	3	0	0	0
	DF	(Scotland) SCO	Alex McCulloch	16	0	14	0	2	0
	DF	(Scotland) SCO	John O'Neil	24	0	21	0	3	0
	DF	(Scotland) SCO	Robert Thomson	10	0	9	0	1	0
	MF	(Scotland) SCO	Bob Gordon	23	0	20	0	3	0
	MF	(Scotland) SCO	John Lipton	7	0	7	0	0	0
	MF	(Scotland) SCO	Charles O'Neill	2	0	1	0	1	0
	MF	(Scotland) SCO	George Ritchie	8	0	7	0	1	0
	FW	(Scotland) SCO	William Blair	8	0	8	0	0	0
	FW	(Scotland) SCO	John Brander	16	3	13	2	3	1
	FW	(Scotland) SCO	Michael Cannon	1	0	1	0	0	0
	FW	(Gibraltar) GIB	Charles Chalk	1	0	1	0	0	0
	FW	(Scotland) SCO	George Galbraith	2	0	2	0	0	0
	FW	(Scotland) SCO	James Gillespie	1	0	1	0	0	0
	FW	(Scotland) SCO	William Greer	16	12	13	11	3	1
	FW	(Scotland) SCO	Johnny Hill	25	15	22	10	3	5
	FW	(Scotland) SCO	Edward Kane	23	1	21	1	2	0
	FW	(Scotland) SCO	Ewart Kinnon	1	0	1	0	0	0
	FW	(Scotland) SCO	John Maginnes	1	0	1	0	0	0
	FW	(Scotland) SCO	Robert Nisbet	9	1	6	1	3	0
	FW	(Scotland) SCO	Peter Taylor	15	2	13	2	2	0
	FW	(Scotland) SCO	Matt Teadale	23	4	20	4	3	0
	FW	(Scotland) SCO	James Walker	3	0	3	0	0	0
	FW	(Scotland) SCO	Robert Walker	14	3	14	3	0	0
	FW	(Scotland) SCO	James White	1	0	1	0	0	0

=== Transfers ===
==== Players in ====
Player	From	Date
(Scotland) William Greer	(Scotland) Clyde	12 Jun 1908
(Scotland) John O'Neil	(Scotland) Clydebank Juniors	13 Jun 1908
(Gibraltar) Charles Chalk	(Scotland) East Stirling (trialist)	1 Jul 1908
(Scotland) John Maginnes	(Scotland) Morton (trialist)	10 Jul 1908
(Scotland) Michael Cannon	(Scotland) East Stirling (trialist)	8 Aug 1908
(Scotland) Robert Thomson	(Scotland) Hearts (loan)	8 Aug 1908
(Scotland) William Monteith	(Scotland) Beith	20 Aug 1908
(Scotland) James Gillespie	(Scotland) Trialist	Sep 1908
(Scotland) Ewart Kinnon	(Scotland) Mossent Amateurs (trialist)	12 Oct 1908
(Scotland) Robert Walker	(Scotland) Maryhill	13 Oct 1908
(Scotland) James Walker	(Scotland) Clyde	15 Oct 1908
(Scotland) William Blair	(Scotland) Renfrew Victoria	22 Dec 1908
(Scotland) James White	(Scotland) Barrhead Auburn Victoria	22 Dec 1908
(Scotland) John Lipton	(Scotland) Shettleston	26 Dec 1908
(Scotland) David Hynds	(Scotland) Shettleston	1 Apr 1909
(Scotland) John McNee	(Scotland) Yoker Athletic	14 Apr 1909
(Scotland) William Gibson	(Scotland) Yoker Athletic	Apr 1909

==== Players out ====
Player	To	Date
(Scotland) Bob McLean	(Scotland) Vale of Leven	8 Aug 1908
(Scotland) William Greer	(England) QPR	14 Dec 1908
(Scotland) Peter Taylor	(England) Barrow	19 March 1909
(Scotland) Matt Teasdale	(China) Emigrated	Apr 1909
(Scotland) Charles O'Neill	(Scotland) Dumbarton Harp	Jun 1908

In addition David Blair, George Gillespie, Alex McCulloch, Robert Nisbet, George Ritchie, James Stevenson, James Walker and Robert Walker all played their final 'first XI' games in Dumbarton colours.

== Reserve team ==
Dumbarton lost in the semi-final of the Scottish Second XI Cup to Falkirk.
