= Matthew Paterson =

Matthew Paterson may refer to:

- Matt Paterson (born 1989), Scottish footballer
- Matt Paterson (footballer born 1888), Scottish footballer
- Matthew C. Paterson (died 1846), American lawyer and politician from New York
