= 1908–09 Chelsea F.C. season =

English football club season

Chelsea
1908–09 season
- Owner: Gus Mears
- Chairman: Claude Kirby
- Manager: David Calderhead
- Stadium: Stamford Bridge
- First Division: 11th
- FA Cup: Second Round
- Top goalscorer: League: George Hilsdon (25); All: George Hilsdon (27)
- Highest home attendance: 55,000 vs Woolwich Arsenal (28 November 1908)
- Lowest home attendance: 10,000 vs Blackburn Rovers (27 February 1909)
- Average home league attendance: 30,632
- Biggest win: 4–1 v Bury (12 September 1908); 4–1 v Middlesbrough (1 January 1909)
- Biggest defeat: 0–6 v Preston North End (7 September 1908)
Home colours	Away colours

The 1908–09 season was Chelsea Football Club's fourth competitive season and fourth year in existence.

== Competitions ==
=== First Division ===
==== Table ====
Pos	Team	Pld	W	D	L	GF	GA	GAv	Pts
9	Middlesbrough	38	14	9	15	59	53	1.113	37
10	Preston North End	38	13	11	14	48	44	1.091	37
11	Chelsea	38	14	9	15	56	61	0.918	37
12	Sheffield United	38	14	9	15	51	59	0.864	37
13	Manchester United	38	15	7	16	58	68	0.853	37

Source: World Football
Rules for classification: 1) Points; 2) Goal average; 3) Goals scored

=== FA Cup ===
==== Results ====
16 January 1909 First round	Hull City	1–1	Chelsea	Hull, Yorkshire
				Stadium: Anlaby Road

5 February 1909 First round reply	Chelsea	1–0	Hull City	Fulham, London
				Stadium: Stamford Bridge

5 February 1909 Second round	Chelsea	0–1	Tottenham Hotspur	Fulham, London
			Humphreys	Stadium: Stamford Bridge; Attendance: 31,766
