= 1908–09 Heart of Midlothian F.C. season =

Heart of Midlothian
1908–09 season
- Manager: James McGhee
- Stadium: Tynecastle Park
- Scottish First Division: 11th
- Scottish Cup: 2nd Round

During the 1908–09 season Hearts competed in the Scottish First Division, the Scottish Cup and the East of Scotland Shield.

== Fixtures ==
=== Wilson Cup ===
1 January 1909 Wilson Cup	Hibernian	1–0	Hearts	Easter Road

=== North Eastern Cup ===
14 October 1908 North Eastern Cup 1st Round	Aberdeen	1–0	Hearts	Pittodrie Park

=== East of Scotland Cup ===
26 August 1908 East of Scotland Cup Final	St Bernard's	1–2	Hearts	Royal Gymnasium Ground

=== Rosebery Charity Cup ===
8 May 1909 Rosebery Charity Cup SF	Hibernian	2–1	Hearts	Easter Road

=== Scottish Cup ===
23 January 1909 Scottish Cup R1	Hearts	2–1	Kilmarnock	Tynecastle Park
				Attendance: 18,000

6 February 1909 Scottish Cup R2	Airdrieonians	2–0	Hearts	Broomfield Park
				Attendance: 12,000

=== Scottish First Division ===
15 August 1908 Scottish First Division	Dundee	2–1	Hearts	Dens Park
				Attendance: 12,000

22 August 1908 Scottish First Division	Hearts	1–1	Clyde	Tynecastle Park
				Attendance: 11,000

29 August 1908 Scottish First Division	St Mirren	2–0	Hearts	St Mirren Park, Love Street
				Attendance: 8,000

5 September 1908 Scottish First Division	Hearts	3–0	Queen's Park	Tynecastle Park
				Attendance: 8,500

12 September 1908 Scottish First Division	Motherwell	1–6	Hearts	Fir Park
				Attendance: 6,000

19 September 1908 Scottish First Division	Hearts	1–1	Hibernian	Tynecastle Park
				Attendance: 15,000

26 September 1908 Scottish First Division	Hearts	2–6	Airdrieonians	Tynecastle Park
				Attendance: 5,500

10 October 1908 Scottish First Division	Hearts	0–0	Kilmarnock	Tynecastle Park
				Attendance: 7,500

17 October 1908 Scottish First Division	Hearts	3–0	Port Glasgow Athletic	Tynecastle Park
				Attendance: 6,000

24 October 1908 Scottish First Division	Partick Thistle	3–2	Hearts	Shawfield Stadium
				Attendance: 2,000

31 October 1908 Scottish First Division	Hearts	1–1	Aberdeen	Tynecastle Park
				Attendance: 8,500

7 November 1908 Scottish First Division	Hibernian	0–1	Hearts	Easter Road
				Attendance: 10,000

14 November 1908 Scottish First Division	Hamilton Academical	1–1	Hearts	Douglas Park
				Attendance: 4,000

21 November 1908 Scottish First Division	Hearts	1–2	St Mirren	Tynecastle Park
				Attendance: 7,500

28 November 1908 Scottish First Division	Rangers	4–3	Hearts	Ibrox Park
				Attendance: 2,000

5 December 1908 Scottish First Division	Hearts	5–0	Morton	Tynecastle Park
				Attendance: 3,000

12 December 1908 Scottish First Division	Port Glasgow Athletic	1–0	Hearts	Clune Park
				Attendance: 2,000

19 December 1908 Scottish First Division	Third Lanark	1–3	Hearts	Cathkin Park
				Attendance: 2,000

26 December 1908 Scottish First Division	Hearts	1–0	Hamilton Academical	Tynecastle Park
				Attendance: 4,000

2 January 1909 Scottish First Division	Hearts	1–2	Third Lanark	Tynecastle Park
				Attendance: 10,000

9 January 1909 Scottish First Division	Celtic	1–1	Hearts	Celtic Park
				Attendance: 15,000

16 January 1909 Scottish First Division	Hearts	3–2	Motherwell	Tynecastle Park
				Attendance: 2,500

30 January 1909 Scottish First Division	Morton	4–1	Hearts	Cappielow Park
				Attendance: 2,000

13 February 1909 Scottish First Division	Aberdeen	1–0	Hearts	Pittodrie Park
				Attendance: 6,000

20 February 1909 Scottish First Division	Kilmarnock	2–5	Hearts	Rugby Park
				Attendance: 5,500

13 March 1909 Scottish First Division	Clyde	1–0	Hearts	Shawfield Stadium
				Attendance: 5,000

20 March 1909 Scottish First Division	Hearts	1–0	Dundee	Tynecastle Park
				Attendance: 12,500

27 March 1909 Scottish First Division	Queen's Park	2–2	Hearts	Hampden Park
				Attendance: 3,000

3 April 1909 Scottish First Division	Hearts	0–0	Rangers	Tynecastle Park
				Attendance: 11,500

10 April 1909 Scottish First Division	Airdrieonians	2–1	Hearts	Broomfield Park
				Attendance: 2,000

17 April 1909 Scottish First Division	Hearts	1–0	Falkirk	Tynecastle Park
				Attendance: 6,500

19 April 1909 Scottish First Division	Hearts	1–2	Celtic	Tynecastle Park
				Attendance: 12,000

24 April 1909 Scottish First Division	Falkirk	4–1	Hearts	Brockville Park
				Attendance: 6,000

28 April 1909 Scottish First Division	Hearts	1–0	Partick Thistle	Tynecastle Park
				Attendance: 1,000

== See also ==
- List of Heart of Midlothian F.C. seasons
