= 1908–09 Scottish Football League =

Scottish football season

Statistics of the Scottish Football League in season 1908–09.

== Scottish League Division One ==
Pos	Team	Pld	W	D	L	GF	GA	GD	Pts
1	Celtic (C)	34	23	5	6	71	24	+47	51
2	Dundee	34	22	6	6	70	32	+38	50
3	Clyde	34	21	6	7	61	37	+24	48
4	Rangers	34	19	7	8	91	38	+53	45
5	Airdrieonians	34	16	9	9	67	46	+21	41
6	Hibernian	34	16	7	11	40	32	+8	39
7	St Mirren	34	15	6	13	53	45	+8	36
8	Aberdeen	34	15	6	13	61	53	+8	36
9	Kilmarnock	34	13	7	14	47	61	−14	33
10	Falkirk	34	13	7	14	58	56	+2	33
11	Heart of Midlothian	34	12	8	14	54	49	+5	32
12	Third Lanark	34	11	10	13	56	49	+7	32
13	Motherwell	34	11	6	17	47	73	−26	28
14	Port Glasgow Athletic	34	10	8	16	39	52	−13	28
15	Queen's Park	34	6	13	15	42	65	−23	25
16	Hamilton Academical	34	6	12	16	42	72	−30	24
17	Morton	34	8	7	19	39	90	−51	23
18	Partick Thistle	34	2	4	28	38	102	−64	8

Source: "1908-1909 Division 1 - SPFL Archive". SPFL.
(C) Champions

== Scottish League Division Two ==
Pos	Team	Pld	W	D	L	GF	GA	GD	Pts
1	Abercorn (C)	22	13	5	4	39	17	+22	31
2	Raith Rovers	22	11	6	5	46	22	+24	28
2	Vale of Leven	22	12	4	6	38	25	+13	28
4	Dumbarton	22	10	5	7	34	34	0	25
5	Ayr	22	10	3	9	43	36	+7	23
5	Leith Athletic	22	10	3	9	37	33	+4	23
7	Ayr Parkhouse	22	8	5	9	29	31	−2	21
7	East Stirlingshire	22	9	3	10	27	33	−6	21
7	St Bernard's	22	9	3	10	34	37	−3	21
10	Albion Rovers	22	9	2	11	37	47	−10	20
11	Cowdenbeath	22	4	4	14	19	42	−23	12
12	Arthurlie	22	5	1	16	29	55	−26	11

Source: statto.com
Rules for classification: Teams finish equal if level on points. Points system: 2 points for a win, 1 point for a draw, 0 points for a loss
(C) Champions

== See also ==
- 1908–09 in Scottish football
