= 1908–09 Celtic F.C. season =

Celtic
1908–09 season
- Manager: Willie Maley
- Stadium: Celtic Park
- Scottish First Division: 1st
- Scottish Cup: Finalists

1908–09 was Celtic's 21st season of football, in which they competed in the Scottish First Division. They won the league for the fifth time in a row, which was a record at the time.

Celtic also reached the final of the Scottish Cup against fellow Glasgow team Rangers. After a 2–2 draw on 10 April, a replay on 17 April also ended in a draw, 1-1. Crowd disorder after it was announced that extra time was only provided in the event of a second replay caused serious damage at Hampden Park, as well as over 100 injured. Both clubs requested the SFA not schedule a second replay and subsequently, the trophy and medals were withheld, with no winner ever declared.

Celtic also reached the finals of both the Glasgow Cup and the Glasgow Merchants' Charity Cup, but lost both: the Glasgow Cup to Third Lanark 4–0 after two replays; and the Charity Cup to Rangers, 4–2.

== Competitions ==
=== Scottish First Division ===
==== League table ====
Pos	Team	Pld	W	D	L	GF	GA	GD	Pts
1	Celtic (C)	34	23	5	6	71	24	+47	51
2	Dundee	34	22	6	6	70	32	+38	50
3	Clyde	34	21	6	7	61	37	+24	48
4	Rangers	34	19	7	8	91	38	+53	45
5	Airdrieonians	34	16	9	9	67	46	+21	41

Source: "1908-1909 Division 1 - SPFL Archive". SPFL.
(C) Champions

==== Matches ====
15 August 1908 First Division	Morton	0–5	Celtic	Greenock
				Stadium: Cappielow Park; Attendance: 7,500

22 August 1908 First Division	Celtic	5–1	Kilmarnock	Glasgow
				Stadium: Celtic Park; Attendance: 11,000

29 August 1908 First Division	Dundee	2–1	Celtic	Dundee
				Stadium: Dens Park; Attendance: 22,000

5 September 1908 First Division	Celtic	0–1	St Mirren	Glasgow
				Stadium: Celtic Park; Attendance: 7,000

28 September 1908 First Division	Celtic	1–0	Third Lanark	Glasgow
				Stadium: Celtic Park; Attendance: 15,000

10 October 1908 First Division	Celtic	2–0	Dundee	Glasgow
				Stadium: Celtic Park; Attendance: 16,500

31 October 1908 First Division	Clyde	0–2	Celtic	Glasgow
				Stadium: Shawfield Stadium; Attendance: 18,000

7 November 1908 First Division	Celtic	3–0	Partick Thistle	Glasgow
				Stadium: Celtic Park; Attendance: 15,000

14 November 1908 First Division	Celtic	2–1	Port Glasgow Athletic	Glasgow
				Stadium: Celtic Park; Attendance: 3,000

21 November 1908 First Division	Airdrieonians	1–2	Celtic	Airdrie
				Stadium: Broomfield Park; Attendance: 11,000

28 November 1908 First Division	Celtic	4–0	Queen's Park	Glasgow
				Stadium: Celtic Park; Attendance: 16,000

5 December 1908 First Division	Motherwell	1–2	Celtic	Motherwell
				Stadium: Fir Park; Attendance: 11,000

12 December 1908 First Division	Celtic	2–0	Hibernian	Glasgow
				Stadium: Celtic Park; Attendance: 8,000

19 December 1908 First Division	Aberdeen	0–2	Celtic	Aberdeen
				Stadium: Pittodrie Park; Attendance: 10,000

26 December 1909 First Division	Celtic	0–1	Clyde	Glasgow
				Stadium: Celtic Park; Attendance: 12,000

1 January 1909 First Division	Rangers	1–3	Celtic	Glasgow
				Stadium: Ibrox Park; Attendance: 61,500

2 January 1909 First Division	Kilmarnock	3–1	Celtic	Kilmarnock
				Stadium: Rugby Park; Attendance: 13,000

9 January 1909 First Division	Celtic	1–1	Hearts	Glasgow
				Stadium: Celtic Park; Attendance: 15,000

30 January 1909 First Division	Celtic	2–0	Falkirk	Glasgow
				Stadium: Celtic Park; Attendance: 10,000

13 February 1909 First Division	Port Glasgow Athletic	1–4	Celtic	Port Glasgow
				Stadium: Clune Park; Attendance: 5,000

24 February 1909 First Division	Celtic	2–0	Aberdeen	Glasgow
				Stadium: Celtic Park; Attendance: 6,000

6 March 1909 First Division	Falkirk	1–1	Celtic	Falkirk
				Stadium: Brockville Park; Attendance: 8,000

13 March 1909 First Division	Celtic	2–3	Rangers	Glasgow
				Stadium: Celtic Park; Attendance: 28,000

29 March 1909 First Division	Partick Thistle	0–1	Celtic	Glasgow
				Stadium: Celtic Park; Attendance: 1,500

3 April 1909 First Division	St Mirren	0–1	Celtic	Paisley
				Stadium: St Mirren Park, Love Street; Attendance: 10,000

12 April 1909 First Division	Third Lanark	1–1	Celtic	Glasgow
				Stadium: Cathkin Park; Attendance: 14,000

19 April 1909 First Division	Hearts	1–2	Celtic	Edinburgh
				Stadium: Tynecastle Park; Attendance: 12,000

21 April 1910 First Division	Celtic	1–1	Hamilton Academical	Glasgow
				Stadium: Celtic Park; Attendance: 8,000

22 April 1909 First Division	Celtic	5–1	Morton	Glasgow
				Stadium: Celtic Park; Attendance: 8,000

24 April 1909 First Division	Celtic	0–0	Airdrieonians	Glasgow
				Stadium: Celtic Park; Attendance: 10,000

26 April 1909 First Division	Celtic	4–0	Motherwell	Glasgow
				Stadium: Celtic Park; Attendance: 10,000

28 April 1909 First Division	Queen's Park	0–5	Celtic	Glasgow
				Stadium: Hampden Park; Attendance: 6,000

29 April 1909 First Division	Hibernian	1–0	Celtic	Edinburgh
				Stadium: Easter Road; Attendance: 8,000

30 April 1909 First Division	Hamilton Academical	1–2	Celtic	Hamilton
				Stadium: Douglas Park; Attendance: 8,000

=== Scottish Cup ===
23 January 1909 First round	Leith Athletic	2–4	Celtic	Leith
				Stadium: Boghead Park; Attendance: 7,000

6 February 1909 Second round	Celtic	4–0	Port Glasgow Athletic	Glasgow
				Stadium: Celtic Park; Attendance: 7,000

20 February 1909 Third round	Celtic	3–1	Airdrieonians	Glasgow
				Stadium: Celtic Park; Attendance: 20,000

20 March 1909 Semi-final	Celtic	0–0	Clyde	Glasgow
				Stadium: Celtic Park; Attendance: 40,000

27 March 1909 Semi-final Replay	Celtic	2–0	Clyde	Glasgow
				Stadium: Celtic Park; Attendance: 35,000

10 April 1909 Final	Celtic	2–2	Rangers	Glasgow
				Stadium: Hampden Park; Attendance: 70,000

17 April 1909 Final Replay	Rangers	1–1	Celtic	Glasgow
				Stadium: Hampden Park; Attendance: 60,000
