= 1912–13 Chelsea F.C. season =

English football club season

Chelsea
1912–13 season
- Owner: Gus Mears
- Chairman: Claude Kirby
- Manager: David Calderhead
- Stadium: Stamford Bridge
- Second Division: 18th
- FA Cup: Second Round
- Top goalscorer: League: Vivian Woodward (10); All: Bob Whittingham (12)
- Highest home attendance: 65,000 vs Aston Villa (21 March 1913)
- Lowest home attendance: 14,569 vs Southend United (11 January 1913)
- Average home league attendance: 35,111
- Biggest win: 5–2 v Southend United (11 January 1913); 5–2 v Notts County (26th Apr 1913)
- Biggest defeat: 0–6 v The Wednesday (5 February 1913)
Home colours	Away colours

The 1912–13 season was Chelsea Football Club's eighth competitive season The club finished 18th in the First Division, narrowly avoiding relegation.

== Table ==
Pos	Team	Pld	W	D	L	GF	GA	GAv	Pts	Relegation
1	Sunderland (C)	38	25	4	9	86	43	2.000	54	
2	Aston Villa	38	19	12	7	86	52	1.654	50	
3	The Wednesday	38	21	7	10	75	55	1.364	49	
4	Manchester United	38	19	8	11	69	43	1.605	46	
5	Blackburn Rovers	38	16	13	9	79	43	1.837	45	
6	Manchester City	38	18	8	12	53	37	1.432	44	
7	Derby County	38	17	8	13	69	66	1.045	42	
8	Bolton Wanderers	38	16	10	12	62	63	0.984	42	
9	Oldham Athletic	38	14	14	10	50	55	0.909	42	
10	West Bromwich Albion	38	13	12	13	57	50	1.140	38	
11	Everton	38	15	7	16	48	54	0.889	37	
12	Liverpool	38	16	5	17	61	71	0.859	37	
13	Bradford City	38	12	11	15	50	60	0.833	35	
14	Newcastle United	38	13	8	17	47	47	1.000	34	
15	Sheffield United	38	14	6	18	56	70	0.800	34	
16	Middlesbrough	38	11	10	17	55	69	0.797	32	
17	Tottenham Hotspur	38	12	6	20	45	72	0.625	30	
18	Chelsea	38	11	6	21	51	73	0.699	28	
19	Notts County (R)	38	7	9	22	28	56	0.500	23	Relegation to the Second Division
20	Woolwich Arsenal (R)	38	3	12	23	26	74	0.351	18	Relegation to the Second Division

Source: World Football
Rules for classification: 1) Points; 2) Goal average; 3) Goals scored
(C) Champions; (R) Relegated
