= 1909–10 Bradford City A.F.C. season =

Bradford City A.F.C.
1909–10 season
- Manager: Peter O'Rourke
- Ground: Valley Parade
- First Division: 7th
- FA Cup: Second round

The 1909–10 Bradford City A.F.C. season was the seventh in the club's history.

The club finished 7th in Division One, and reached the 2nd round of the FA Cup.

== Sources ==
- Frost, Terry (1988). Bradford City A Complete Record 1903-1988. Breedon Books Sport. ISBN 0-907969-38-0.
