= 1908–09 Hibernian F.C. season =

Hibernian
1908–09 season
- Manager: Dan McMichael
- Scottish First Division: 6th
- Scottish Cup: 2nd Round
- Average home league attendance: 13,721 (down 618)

During the 1908–09 season Hibernian, a football club based in Edinburgh, finished sixth out of 18 clubs in the Scottish First Division.

== Scottish First Division ==
Match Day	Date	Opponent	H/A	Score	Hibernian Scorer(s)	Attendance
1	15 August	Airdrieonians	H	2–0		8,000
2	22 August	Hamilton Academical	A	1–1		5,000
3	29 August	Third Lanark	H	3–0		6,000
4	5 September	Falkirk	A	0–0		5,000
5	12 September	Clyde	H	1–1		7,000
6	19 September	Heart of Midlothian	A	1–1		15,000
7	26 September	Motherwell	A	0–3		6,000
8	10 October	Port Glasgow Athletic	A	2–1		2,000
9	17 October	Dundee	A	0–3		9,000
10	24 October	Morton	H	4–1		6,000
11	31 October	St Mirren	A	0–1		5,500
12	7 November	Heart of Midlothian	H	0–1		10,000
13	14 November	Aberdeen	H	2–1		6,000
14	21 November	Kilmarnock	A	1–0		3,500
15	28 November	Partick Thistle	H	1–1		2,000
16	5 December	Queen's Park	A	1–0		4,000
17	12 December	Celtic	A	0–2		8,000
18	19 December	Motherwell	H	3–0		4,000
19	2 January	Morton	A	0–1		2,000
20	9 January	Kilmarnock	H	2–1		5,500
21	30 January	Port Glasgow Athletic	H	1–1		4,000
22	13 February	Queen's Park	H	1–0		10,000
23	20 February	Dundee	H	0–1		10,000
24	6 March	Rangers	A	0–0		2,000
25	13 March	Falkirk	H	2–0		5,000
26	20 March	Airdrieonians	A	1–2		4,000
27	27 March	St Mirren	H	2–1		5,000
28	3 April	Aberdeen	A	0–4		4,000
29	10 April	Partick Thistle	A (Note: This game was played at Hibernian's Easter Road ground, despite Partick Thistle being the home team.)	5–1		2,000
30	17 April	Clyde	A	0–2		4,000
31	19 April	Rangers	H	1–0		6,000
32	24 April	Hamilton Academical	H	2–0		3,000
33	27 April	Third Lanark	A	0–1		12,000
34	29 April	Celtic	H	1–0		8,000

=== Final League table ===
P	Team	Pld	W	D	L	GF	GA	GD	Pts
5	Airdrieonians	34	16	9	9	67	46	21	41
6	Hibernian	34	16	7	11	40	32	8	39
7	St Mirren	34	15	6	13	53	45	8	36

=== Scottish Cup ===
Round	Date	Opponent	H/A	Score	Hibernian Scorer(s)	Attendance
R1	23 January	Ayr	H	2–0		2,000
R2	29 January	Clyde	A	0–1		12,000

== See also ==
- List of Hibernian F.C. seasons
