= 1922–23 Hibernian F.C. season =

Hibernian
1922–23 season
- Manager: Alex Maley
- Scottish First Division: 8th
- Scottish Cup: F
- Average home league attendance: 13,631 (up 2,012)

During the 1922–23 season Hibernian, a football club based in Edinburgh, finished eighth out of 20 clubs in the Scottish First Division.

== Scottish First Division ==
Match Day	Date	Opponent	H/A	Score	Hibernian Scorer(s)	Attendance
1	16 August	Falkirk	H	1–0		12,000
2	19 August	Partick Thistle	H	1–0		16,000
3	26 August	Third Lanark	A	1–0		7,000
4	2 September	Motherwell	H	2–1		16,000
5	9 September	Aberdeen	A	0–2		20,000
6	16 September	St Mirren	H	0–3		12,000
7	18 September	Celtic	H	1–0		15,000
8	23 September	Heart of Midlothian	A	2–2		31,500
9	30 September	Kilmarnock	H	1–1		18,000
10	7 October	Rangers	A	0–2		22,000
11	14 October	Airdrieonians	H	1–0		16,000
12	21 October	Raith Rovers	H	2–0		16,000
13	28 October	Alloa Athletic	A	1–2		8,000
14	4 November	Falkirk	A	0–5		10,000
15	11 November	Dundee	H	3–3		18,000
16	18 November	Clyde	A	0–0		6,000
17	25 November	Albion Rovers	H	3–0		12,000
18	2 December	Ayr United	A	1–1		5,000
19	9 December	Hamilton Academical	H	2–0		10,000
20	16 December	Motherwell	A	2–0		5,000
21	23 December	Morton	H	0–1		11,000
22	30 December	Kilmarnock	A	0–1		5,000
23	1 January	Heart of Midlothian	H	2–1		25,000
24	2 January	Dundee	A	0–1		10,000
25	6 January	St Mirren	A	1–2		8,000
26	20 January	Ayr United	H	3–0		10,000
27	31 January	Celtic	A	0–0		15,000
28	3 February	Third Lanark	H	2–0		10,000
29	14 February	Morton	A	0–1		4,000
30	17 February	Alloa Athletic	H	2–1		8,000
31	28 February	Hamilton Academical	A	1–2		4,000
32	3 March	Aberdeen	H	2–0		10,000
33	14 March	Albion Rovers	A	2–1		5,000
34	17 March	Clyde	H	1–2		8,000
35	24 March	Airdrieonians	A	1–2		5,000
36	2 April	Raith Rovers	A	2–2		4,000
37	7 April	Rangers	H	2–0		16,000
38	21 April	Partick Thistle	A	0–1		8,000

=== Final League table ===
P	Team	Pld	W	D	L	GF	GA	GD	Pts
7	Dundee	38	17	7	14	51	45	6	41
8	Hibernian	38	17	7	14	45	40	5	41
9	Raith Rovers	38	13	13	12	31	43	–12	39

=== Scottish Cup ===
Round	Date	Opponent	H/A	Score	Hibernian Scorer(s)	Attendance
R1	13 January	Clackmannan	H	4–0		9,000
R2	27 January	Peebles Rovers	H	0–0		14,000
R2 R	30 January	Peebles Rovers	H	3–0		8,000
R3	10 February	Queen's Park	H	2–0		21,000
R4	24 February	Aberdeen	H	2–0		28,000
SF	10 March	Third Lanark	N	1–0		39,000
F	31 March	Celtic	N	0–1		80,100

== See also ==
- List of Hibernian F.C. seasons
