= Harry Paul =

Scottish footballer

Personal information
- Full name: Harold McDonald Paul
- Date of birth: 31 August 1886
- Place of birth: Glasgow, Scotland
- Date of death: 18 April 1948 (aged 61)
- Position: Forward

Senior career*
Years	Team	Apps	(Gls)
1905–1914	Queen's Park	163	(31)

International career
1909	Scotland	3	(2)
1909	Scottish League XI	2	(1)
- * Club domestic league appearances and goals

Harold McDonald Paul (31 August 1886 – 18 April 1948) was a Scottish amateur footballer who played as a forward in the Scottish League for Queen's Park. He was capped by Scotland at international level.

== Personal life ==
Paul attended Crieff Academy and Glasgow University, studying veterinary surgery at the latter institution. He later became a member of the Royal College of Veterinary Surgeons. During the First World War, Paul served as an enlisted man in the Scottish Horse and then as an officer in the Royal Army Veterinary Corps. He returned to veterinary surgery after the war.

== Career statistics ==
Appearances and goals by club, season and competition
Club	Season	League			Scottish Cup		Other		Total	
Club	Season	Division	Apps	Goals	Apps	Goals	Apps	Goals	Apps	Goals
Queen's Park	1904–05	Scottish First Division	1	0	0	0	1 (Note: Appearance in Glasgow Merchants Charity Cup.)	0	2	0
Queen's Park	1905–06	Scottish First Division	23	5	2	0	0	0	25	5
Queen's Park	1906–07	Scottish First Division	16	4	5	1	1 (Note: Appearances in Glasgow Cup.)	0	22	5
Queen's Park	1907–08	Scottish First Division	23	4	5	3	2 (Note: 1 appearance in Glasgow Cup, 1 appearance in Glasgow Merchants Charity Cup.)	0	30	7
Queen's Park	1908–09	Scottish First Division	29	8	4	2	3 (Note: 2 appearances in Glasgow Cup, 1 appearance in Glasgow Merchants Charity Cup.)	0	36	10
Queen's Park	1909–10	Scottish First Division	12	4	6	1	3	0	21	5
Queen's Park	1910–11	Scottish First Division	10	0	0	0	1	0	11	0
Queen's Park	1911–12	Scottish First Division	13	0	1	0	0	0	14	0
Queen's Park	1912–13	Scottish First Division	15	2	2	1	1	0	18	3
Queen's Park	1913–14	Scottish First Division	22	4	5	1	1	0	28	5
Career total			163	31	30	9	13	0	206	40
