= Charles Chalk =

Gibraltarian footballer (1876–1945)

Personal information
- Full name: Charles Chalk
- Date of birth: 1876
- Place of birth: Gibraltar
- Date of death: 24 May 1945 (aged 68–69)
- Place of death: Lanark

Senior career*
| Years | Team | Apps | (Gls) |
| 1903–1904 | Rangers | | |
| 1904–1906 | Hamilton Academical | | |
| 1906–1908 | East Stirlingshire | | |
| 1908–1909 | Dumbarton | 1 | (0) |
| 1909–1910 | Partick Thistle | | |
- * Club domestic league appearances and goals

Charles Chalk (1876 – 24 May 1945) was a footballer, born in Gibraltar who played for Rangers, Hamilton, East Stirlingshire, Dumbarton and Partick Thistle.
