= Alexander Thomson (footballer) =

Scottish footballer (1877–1959)

Personal information
- Full name: Alexander Thomson
- Date of birth: 18 February 1877
- Place of birth: Airdrie, Scotland
- Date of death: 3 July 1959 (aged 82)
- Place of death: Shotts, Scotland
- Position: Inside forward

Youth career
- Coatbridge Caledonians

Senior career*
Years	Team	Apps	(Gls)
1899–1917	Airdrieonians	459	(144)

International career
1909	Scotland	1	(1)
- * Club domestic league appearances and goals

Alexander Thomson (18 February 1877 – 3 July 1959) was a Scottish footballer who played as an inside forward.

== Career ==
Born in Airdrie, Thomson played club football solely for hometown team Airdrieonians; he helped the Diamonds to achieve their first promotion to the top level as winners of the 1902–03 Scottish Division Two championship, and they would retain their place for the next three decades.

Thomson made one appearance for Scotland, scoring the third goal in a 5–0 win over Ireland in the 1909 British Home Championship having come in at centre forward, which was not his usual role, as a late replacement for Jimmy Quinn.

== See also ==
- List of one-club men in association football
- List of Scotland international footballers with one cap
