= Arthur Cowell =

English footballer (1886–1959)

Personal information
- Date of birth: 20 May 1886
- Place of birth: Blackburn, England
- Date of death: 12 February 1959 (aged 72)
- Height: 5 ft 7 in (1.70 m)
- Position: Left back

Youth career
- Blackburn St Peter's
- Nelson

Senior career*
Years	Team	Apps	(Gls)
1905–1920	Blackburn Rovers	280	(0)
1915–1916	→ Burnley (war guest)		

International career
1910	England	1	(0)
- * Club domestic league appearances and goals

Arthur Cowell (20 May 1886 – 12 February 1959) was an English international footballer who played as a left back.

== Career ==
Born in Blackburn, Cowell started his career in amateur football with Blackburn St Peter's and Nelson. He then played professionally for Blackburn Rovers, making 280 appearances in the Football League for the club between 1905 and 1920. He earned one cap for England in 1910. During the 1915–16 season, Cowell played as a guest in five wartime fixtures for Burnley.
