= Andy Hunter (footballer, born 1883) =

Irish association football player

Personal information
- Full name: Andrew Hunter
- Date of birth: 11 October 1883
- Place of birth: Belfast, Ireland
- Date of death: 23 August 1933
- Place of death: Belfast, Northern Ireland
- Position: Forward

Senior career*
Years	Team	Apps	(Gls)
- Woodvale
- Royal Army Medical Corps
- Linfield Swifts
1904–1907	Distillery		
1907–1908	Belfast Celtic F.C.		
1908–1909	Glentoran	3	
1909–1910	The Wednesday	14	(3)
1909	→ Distillery (loan)		
1910–1912	Glentoran		

International career
1905–1909	Ireland Amateurs	8	(1)
- * Club domestic league appearances and goals

Andy Hunter (11 October 1883 – 23 August 1933) was an Irish footballer who played as a forward

== Club career ==
Hunter joined Distillery in 1904 having played youth football for Woodvale and Linfield Swifts, as well as the Royal Army Medical Corps . Hunter was part of the side that won the Irish Cup in 1905 and the Irish League in 1905–06, before joining Belfast Celtic F.C. in May 1907. After one season with Celtic, Hunter joined Glentoran for a season, before signing for The Wednesday in March 1909. Hunter scored his first goal for the English side in the 2–1 victory over Liverpool on 10 April 1909.

Hunter returned for a loan spell at Distillery in the winter of 1909, returning to The Wednesday in the spring of 1910, where he scored two further goals in a 2–1 win against Blackburn Rovers. He would leave Wednesday in the summer of 1910, rejoining Glentoran where he won the County Antrim Shield and Belfast Charity Cup in 1911, before retiring in 1912.

Hunter scored 30 goals in 108 appearances for Distillery across his spells with the club and 25 goals in 63 appearances during both periods with Glentoran.

== International career ==
Hunter made his Ireland debut against Wales during the 1905-06 British Home Championship, and made 8 international appearances, his only goal coming in his final international against Wales in 1909.
