= 1910–11 Chelsea F.C. season =

English football club season

Chelsea
1910–11 season
- Owner: Gus Mears
- Chairman: Claude Kirby
- Manager: David Calderhead
- Stadium: Stamford Bridge
- Second Division: 3rd
- FA Cup: Semi-finals
- Top goalscorer: League: Bob Whittingham (30); All: Bob Whittingham (34)
- Highest home attendance: 77,952 vs Swindon Town (11 March 1911)
- Lowest home attendance: 12,600 vs West Bromwich Albion (29 March 1911)
- Average home league attendance: 24,611
- Biggest win: 7–0 v Lincoln City (29 October 1910)
- Biggest defeat: 0–3 v Newcastle United (25 March 1911)
| Home colours | Away colours |

The 1910–11 season was Chelsea Football Club's sixth competitive season and sixth year in existence. The club finished 3rd in the Second Division, narrowly missing out on promotion back to the First Division. They also reached an FA Cup semi-final for the first time, losing 3–0 to Newcastle United.

== Table ==
| Pos | Team | Pld | W | D | L | GF | GA | GAv | Pts | Promotion or relegation |
|---|---|---|---|---|---|---|---|---|---|---|
| 1 | West Bromwich Albion (C, P) | 38 | 22 | 9 | 7 | 67 | 41 | 1.634 | 53 | Promotion to the First Division |
| 2 | Bolton Wanderers (P) | 38 | 21 | 9 | 8 | 69 | 40 | 1.725 | 51 | Promotion to the First Division |
| 3 | Chelsea | 38 | 20 | 9 | 9 | 71 | 35 | 2.029 | 49 | |
| 4 | Clapton Orient | 38 | 19 | 7 | 12 | 44 | 35 | 1.257 | 45 | |
| 5 | Hull City | 38 | 14 | 16 | 8 | 55 | 39 | 1.410 | 44 | |

(C) Champions; (P) Promoted
