= 1907–08 in English football =

Football in England
- Season: 1907–08

The 1907–08 season was the 37th season of competitive football in England. Manchester United were Football League champions for the first time, while Bradford City won the Second Division and Wolverhampton Wanderers won the FA Cup. The Home Championship was shared between England and Scotland.

== FA Cup ==
Wolverhampton Wanderers won the FA Cup for the second time, beating Newcastle United 3–1 in the final.

== Football League ==
Fulham and Oldham Athletic replaced Burslem Port Vale and Burton United in the Football League.

=== First Division ===
Pos	Team	Pld	W	D	L	GF	GA	GAv	Pts	Relegation
1	Manchester United (C)	38	23	6	9	81	48	1.688	52	
2	Aston Villa	38	17	9	12	77	59	1.305	43	
3	Manchester City	38	16	11	11	62	54	1.148	43	
4	Newcastle United	38	15	12	11	65	54	1.204	42	
5	The Wednesday	38	19	4	15	73	64	1.141	42	
6	Middlesbrough	38	17	7	14	54	45	1.200	41	
7	Bury	38	14	11	13	58	61	0.951	39	
8	Liverpool	38	16	6	16	68	61	1.115	38	
9	Nottingham Forest	38	13	11	14	59	62	0.952	37	
10	Bristol City	38	12	12	14	58	61	0.951	36	
11	Everton	38	15	6	17	58	64	0.906	36	
12	Preston North End	38	12	12	14	47	53	0.887	36	
13	Chelsea	38	14	8	16	53	62	0.855	36	
14	Blackburn Rovers	38	12	12	14	51	63	0.810	36	
15	Woolwich Arsenal	38	12	12	14	51	63	0.810	36	
16	Sunderland	38	16	3	19	78	75	1.040	35	
17	Sheffield United	38	12	11	15	52	58	0.897	35	
18	Notts County	38	13	8	17	39	51	0.765	34	
19	Bolton Wanderers (R)	38	14	5	19	52	58	0.897	33	Relegation to the Second Division
20	Birmingham (R)	38	9	12	17	40	60	0.667	30	Relegation to the Second Division

Source: World Football
Rules for classification: 1) Points; 2) Goal average; 3) Goals scored
(C) Champions; (R) Relegated

=== Second Division ===
Pos	Team	Pld	W	D	L	GF	GA	GAv	Pts	Promotion or relegation
1	Bradford City (C, P)	38	24	6	8	90	42	2.143	54	Promotion to the First Division
2	Leicester Fosse (P)	38	21	10	7	72	47	1.532	52	Promotion to the First Division
3	Oldham Athletic	38	22	6	10	76	42	1.810	50	
4	Fulham	38	22	5	11	82	49	1.673	49	
5	West Bromwich Albion	38	19	9	10	61	39	1.564	47	
6	Derby County	38	21	4	13	77	45	1.711	46	
7	Burnley	38	20	6	12	67	50	1.340	46	
8	Hull City	38	21	4	13	73	62	1.177	46	
9	Wolverhampton Wanderers	38	15	7	16	50	45	1.111	37	
10	Stoke (R)	38	16	5	17	57	52	1.096	37	Resigned from the league
11	Gainsborough Trinity	38	14	7	17	47	71	0.662	35	
12	Leeds City	38	12	8	18	53	65	0.815	32	
13	Stockport County	38	12	8	18	48	67	0.716	32	
14	Clapton Orient	38	11	10	17	40	65	0.615	32	
15	Blackpool	38	11	9	18	51	58	0.879	31	
16	Barnsley	38	12	6	20	54	68	0.794	30	
17	Glossop	38	11	8	19	54	74	0.730	30	
18	Grimsby Town	38	11	8	19	43	71	0.606	30	Re-elected
19	Chesterfield Town	38	6	11	21	46	92	0.500	23	Re-elected
20	Lincoln City (R)	38	9	3	26	46	83	0.554	21	Failed re-election and demoted

(C) Champions; (P) Promoted; (R) Relegated

== National team ==
The England national football team were joint winners in the 1908 British Home Championship. England and Scotland shared the trophy, having each beaten Wales and Ireland in their opening matches before drawing 1–1 with each other in the final game.

England began the strongest side, although all four teams played well in their opening games, both Ireland and Wales running their opponents close. In the second matches however, England and Scotland's quality told, as England beat Wales 7–1 in Wrexham and Ireland succumbed 5–0 in Dublin.

England followed this tournament by becoming the first Home Nation to play a non-British nation with a tour of Central Europe, playing against Austria twice Hungary and Bohemia. In October the England amateur team followed this by winning gold in the football tournament at the 1908 Olympics, held in London.

=== Results ===
15 February 1908

Ireland	1–3	England
Denis Hannon	(Summary)	George Hilsdon 2, Vivian Woodward

Solitude Ground, Belfast
Attendance: 22,600
Referee: Thomas Robertson (Scotland)

16 March 1908

Wales	1–7	England
Billy Davies	(Summary)	Vivian Woodward 3, George Hilsdon 2, Jimmy Windridge, Billy Wedlock

Racecourse Ground, Wrexham
Attendance: 7,000
Referee: David Phillips (Scotland)

4 April 1908

Scotland	1–1	England
Andrew Wilson	(Summary)	Jimmy Windridge

Hampden Park, Glasgow
Attendance: 121,452
Referee: James Mason (England)

=== European tour ===
England undertook their first matches against opposition outside the Home Nations, with a summer tour of four games against Central European opposition.

==== Players ====
The players chosen for the tour were:

Name	Position	Club	Appearances	Goals
Horace Bailey	GK	Leicester Fosse	4	0
Frank Bradshaw	CF	Sheffield Wednesday	1	3
Arthur Bridgett	LW	Sunderland	4	2
Walter Corbett	CB	Birmingham City	3	0
Bob Crompton	RB	Blackburn Rovers	4	0
Robert Hawkes	LH	Luton Town	4	0
George Hilsdon	CF	Chelsea	3	8
Jesse Pennington	LB	West Bromwich Albion	1	0
Jock Rutherford	RW	Newcastle United	4	3
Ben Warren	RH	Derby County	4	1
Billy Wedlock	CH	Bristol City	4	0
Jimmy Windridge	FW	Chelsea	4	5
Vivian Woodward	FW	Tottenham Hotspur	4	6

Key

- GK — Goalkeeper
- RB — Right back
- LB — Left back
- CB — Centre back
- CH — Centre half
- LH — Left half
- RH — Right half
- RW — Right winger
- LW — Left winger
- FW — Forward
- CF — Centre forward

==== Match details ====
6 June 1908

Austria	1–6	England
Wilhelm Schmieger	(Summary)	George Hilsdon 2, Jimmy Windridge 2, Arthur Bridgett, Vivian Woodward

Cricketer Platz, Vienna
Attendance: 3,500
Referee: Christiaan J Groothoff (Netherlands)

8 June 1908

Austria	1–11	England
Friedrich Hirschl	(Summary)	Vivian Woodward 4, Frank Bradshaw 3, Arthur Bridgett, Ben Warren, Jock Rutherford, Jimmy Windridge

Hohe Warte Stadium, Vienna
Attendance: 5,000
Referee: Ede Herczog (Hungary)

10 June 1908

Hungary	0–7	England
	(Summary)	George Hilsdon 4, Jock Rutherford, Jimmy Windridge, Vivian Woodward

Millenáris Sporttelep, Budapest
Attendance: 6,500
Referee: Hugo Meisl (Austria)

13 June 1908

Bohemia	0–4	England
	(Summary)	George Hilsdon 2 (1P), Jock Rutherford, Jimmy Windridge

Letná stadium, Prague
Attendance: 12,000
Referee: John Lewis (England)
