= 1921–22 Hibernian F.C. season =

Hibernian
1921–22 season
- Manager: Alex Maley
- Scottish First Division: 7th
- Scottish Cup: R2
- Average home league attendance: 11,619 (up 1,096)

During the 1921–22 season Hibernian, a football club based in Edinburgh, finished seventh out of 22 clubs in the Scottish First Division.

== Scottish First Division ==
Match Day	Date	Opponent	H/A	Score	Hibernian Scorer(s)	Attendance
1	20 August	Celtic	A	1–3		25,000
2	27 August	St Mirren	H	1–1		12,000
3	31 August	Falkirk	A	1–3		6,000
4	3 September	Airdrieonians	A	1–2		7,000
5	7 September	Queen's Park	H	3–0		10,000
6	10 September	Heart of Midlothian	H	2–1		20,000
7	13 September	St Mirren	A	1–1		9,000
8	17 September	Motherwell	A	1–4		6,000
9	19 September	Celtic	H	2–1		16,000
10	24 September	Falkirk	H	1–1		12,000
11	1 October	Aberdeen	A	2–1		10,000
12	8 October	Morton	H	2–1		15,000
13	15 October	Clydebank	A	2–0		8,000
14	22 October	Partick Thistle	H	2–0		4,000
15	29 October	Kilmarnock	A	1–1		5,000
16	5 November	Clyde	H	2–1		12,000
17	12 November	Dundee	H	1–1		12,000
18	19 November	Hamilton Academical	A	2–1		8,000
19	26 November	Dumbarton	H	0–0		12,000
20	3 December	Third Lanark	A	1–2		5,000
21	10 December	Albion Rovers	H	0–1		12,000
22	17 December	Queen's Park	A	3–1		8,000
23	24 December	Rangers	H	0–0		15,000
24	31 December	Ayr United	H	1–1		10,000
25	2 January	Heart of Midlothian	A	2–0		30,500
26	3 January	Dundee	A	0–0		15,000
27	7 January	Motherwell	H	2–0		15,000
28	14 January	Clyde	A	0–2		8,000
29	21 January	Raith Rovers	A	0–0		7,000
30	4 February	Kilmarnock	H	3–0		8,000
31	18 February	Raith Rovers	H	2–1		15,000
32	22 February	Albion Rovers	A	1–2		10,000
33	1 March	Third Lanark	H	0–1		8,000
34	4 March	Dumbarton	A	1–1		4,000
35	15 March	Partick Thistle	A	0–2		6,000
36	18 March	Hamilton Academical	H	1–0		8,000
37	28 March	Rangers	A	0–2		13,000
38	5 April	Morton	A	2–2		3,000
39	8 April	Ayr United	A	2–2		3,000
40	15 April	Airdrieonians	H	0–0		8,000
41	22 April	Aberdeen	H	0–1		12,000
42	29 April	Clydebank	H	6–0		8,000

=== Final League table ===
P	Team	Pld	W	D	L	GF	GA	GD	Pts
6	Partick Thistle	42	20	8	14	57	53	4	48
7	Hibernian	42	16	14	12	55	44	11	46
8	St Mirren	42	17	12	13	71	61	10	46

=== Scottish Cup ===
Round	Date	Opponent	H/A	Score	Hibernian Scorer(s)	Attendance
R1	28 January	Armadale	H	3–0		15,000
R2	11 February	Motherwell	A	2–3		15,000

== See also ==
- List of Hibernian F.C. seasons
