= 1913–14 Chelsea F.C. season =

English football club season

Chelsea
1913–14 season
- Owner: Gus Mears
- Chairman: Claude Kirby
- Manager: David Calderhead
- Stadium: Stamford Bridge
- First Division: 8th
- FA Cup: Second Round
- Top goalscorer: League: Harold Halse (10); All: Harold Halse (10)
- Highest home attendance: 61,500 vs Tottenham Hotspur (6 September 1913)
- Lowest home attendance: 19,000 vs Sheffield United (14 March 1914)
- Average home league attendance: 36,974
- Biggest win: 3–0 v Liverpool (18 October 1913)
- Biggest defeat: 1–6 v Burnley (27 September 1913)
Home colours	Away colours

The 1913–14 season was Chelsea Football Club's ninth competitive season. The club finished 8th in the First Division, their highest league placing to that point.

== Table ==
Pos	Team	Pld	W	D	L	GF	GA	GAv	Pts	Relegation
1	Blackburn Rovers (C)	38	20	11	7	78	42	1.857	51	
2	Aston Villa	38	19	6	13	65	50	1.300	44	
3	Middlesbrough	38	19	5	14	77	60	1.283	43	
4	Oldham Athletic	38	17	9	12	55	45	1.222	43	
5	West Bromwich Albion	38	15	13	10	46	42	1.095	43	
6	Bolton Wanderers	38	16	10	12	65	52	1.250	42	
7	Sunderland	38	17	6	15	63	52	1.212	40	
8	Chelsea	38	16	7	15	46	55	0.836	39	
9	Bradford City	38	12	14	12	40	40	1.000	38	
10	Sheffield United	38	16	5	17	63	60	1.050	37	
11	Newcastle United	38	13	11	14	39	48	0.813	37	
12	Burnley	38	12	12	14	61	53	1.151	36	
13	Manchester City	38	14	8	16	51	53	0.962	36	
14	Manchester United	38	15	6	17	52	62	0.839	36	
15	Everton	38	12	11	15	46	55	0.836	35	
16	Liverpool	38	14	7	17	46	62	0.742	35	
17	Tottenham Hotspur	38	12	10	16	50	62	0.806	34	
18	The Wednesday	38	13	8	17	53	70	0.757	34	
19	Preston North End (R)	38	12	6	20	52	69	0.754	30	Relegation to the Second Division
20	Derby County (R)	38	8	11	19	55	71	0.775	27	Relegation to the Second Division

Source: World Football
Rules for classification: 1) Points; 2) Goal average; 3) Goals scored
(C) Champions; (R) Relegated
