= 1911–12 Chelsea F.C. season =

English football club season

Chelsea
1911–12 season
- Owner: Gus Mears
- Chairman: Claude Kirby
- Manager: David Calderhead
- Stadium: Stamford Bridge
- Second Division: 2nd
- FA Cup: Second Round
- Top goalscorer: League: Bob Whittingham (26); All: Bob Whittingham (26)
- Highest home attendance: 45,000 vs Clapton Orient (2 March 1912)
- Lowest home attendance: 5,000 vs Huddersfield Town (18 November 1911)
- Average home league attendance: 27,198
- Biggest win: 4–0 v Wolverhampton Wanderers (16 September 1911)
- Biggest defeat: 1–3 v Wolverhampton Wanderers (25 March 1911)
| Home colours | Away colours |

The 1911–12 season was Chelsea Football Club's seventh competitive season and seventh year in existence. The club finished 2nd in the Second Division and gained promotion back to the First Division.

== Table ==
| Pos | Team | Pld | W | D | L | GF | GA | GAv | Pts | Promotion or relegation |
|---|---|---|---|---|---|---|---|---|---|---|
| 1 | Derby County (C, P) | 38 | 23 | 8 | 7 | 74 | 28 | 2.643 | 54 | Promotion to the First Division |
| 2 | Chelsea (P) | 38 | 24 | 6 | 8 | 64 | 34 | 1.882 | 54 | Promotion to the First Division |
| 3 | Burnley | 38 | 22 | 8 | 8 | 77 | 41 | 1.878 | 52 | |
| 4 | Clapton Orient | 38 | 21 | 3 | 14 | 61 | 44 | 1.386 | 45 | |
| 5 | Wolverhampton Wanderers | 38 | 16 | 10 | 12 | 57 | 33 | 1.727 | 42 | |

(C) Champions; (P) Promoted
