= 1920–21 Hibernian F.C. season =

Hibernian
1920–21 season
- Manager: Davy Gordon
- Scottish Football League: 13th
- Scottish Cup: R2
- Average home league attendance: 10,523

During the 1920–21 season Hibernian, a football club based in Edinburgh, finished thirteenth out of 22 clubs in the Scottish Football League.

== Scottish Football League ==
Match Day	Date	Opponent	H/A	Score	Hibernian Scorer(s)	Attendance
1	16 August	Motherwell	A	2–4		10,000
2	21 August	St Mirren	H	1–0		10,000
3	25 August	Falkirk	H	0–0		6,000
4	28 August	Heart of Midlothian	A	1–5		27,500
5	1 September	Airdrieonians	H	0–2		8,000
6	4 September	Kilmarnock	H	0–0		10,000
7	11 September	Falkirk	A	3–0		9,000
8	18 September	Dumbarton	H	2–0		10,000
9	20 September	Celtic	H	0–3		20,000
10	25 September	Airdrieonians	A	1–5		6,000
11	27 September	Rangers	A	0–1		20,000
12	2 October	Third Lanark	H	2–1		10,000
13	9 October	Aberdeen	A	1–0		13,500
14	16 October	Motherwell	H	2–3		10,000
15	23 October	Partick Thistle	A	2–3		8,000
16	30 October	Raith Rovers	A	0–2		8,000
17	6 November	Albion Rovers	H	5–2		8,000
18	13 November	Ayr United	A	1–2		3,000
19	20 November	Dundee	H	2–0		12,000
20	27 November	Morton	A	1–1		5,000
21	4 December	Clydebank	H	1–1		8,000
22	11 December	Queen's Park	H	0–2		10,000
23	18 December	Hamilton Academical	A	1–1		4,000
24	25 December	Clydebank	A	2–2		5,000
25	1 January	Heart of Midlothian	H	3–0		26,000
26	3 January	Dundee	A	1–1		20,000
27	8 January	Clyde	A	0–2		3,000
28	15 January	Ayr United	H	3–2		12,000
29	29 January	Queen's Park	A	2–0		8,000
30	12 February	Albion Rovers	A	2–0		9,000
31	19 February	Third Lanark	A	2–0		8,000
32	23 February	Hamilton Academical	H	0–1		6,000
33	26 February	St Mirren	A	2–0		5,000
34	5 March	Aberdeen	H	2–3		6,000
35	12 March	Dumbarton	A	0–1		3,000
36	19 March	Clyde	H	0–1		8,000
37	26 March	Morton	H	4–0		8,000
38	2 April	Kilmarnock	A	3–1		8,000
39	9 April	Rangers	H	1–1		16,000
40	16 April	Raith Rovers	H	1–1		7,000
41	23 April	Celtic	A	0–3		20,000
42	27 April	Partick Thistle	H	2–0		10,000

=== Final League table ===
P	Team	Pld	W	D	L	GF	GA	GD	Pts
12	Aberdeen	42	14	14	14	53	54	–1	42
13	Hibernian	42	16	9	17	58	57	1	41
14	Hamilton Academical	42	14	12	16	44	57	–13	40

=== Scottish Cup ===
Round	Date	Opponent	H/A	Score	Hibernian Scorer(s)	Attendance
R1	22 January	Third Lanark	A	1–1		25,000
R1 R	26 January	Third Lanark	H	1–1		22,000
R1 2R	1 February	Third Lanark	N	1–0		32,000
R2	5 February	Partick Thistle	H	0–0		25,000
R2 R	8 February	Partick Thistle	A	0–0		25,000
R2 2R	15 February	Partick Thistle	N	0–1		18,000

== See also ==
- List of Hibernian F.C. seasons
