= George Hilsdon =

English footballer (1885–1941)

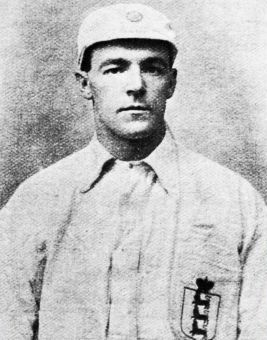
- 1906–1912 card

Personal information
- Full name: George Richard Hilsdon
- Date of birth: 10 August 1885
- Place of birth: Bromley-by-Bow, England
- Date of death: 10 September 1941 (aged 56)
- Place of death: Leicester, England
- Position: Striker

Senior career*
Years	Team	Apps	(Gls)
1904–1906	Bromley	16	(7)
1906–1912	Chelsea	150	(100)
1912–1915	West Ham United	69	(24)
Total		235	(131)

International career
1907–1909	England	8	(14)
- * Club domestic league appearances and goals

George Richard Hilsdon (10 August 1885 – 10 September 1941) was an English footballer who played as a striker. He began his career at West Ham United, making his debut in the 1903–04 season. His brother Jack Hilsdon also played for West Ham at this time. Hilsdon transferred to Chelsea in 1906, and was the first player to score 100 goals for the West London club, reaching a then-record 108 goals from 164 games by the time of his return to West Ham in 1912. His career was ended by the First World War, to which he was conscripted in 1914 and critically injured by a gas attack.

Hilsdon was nicknamed "Gatling Gun" because his shots "were simply unstoppable and which travel[ed] like shots from a gun".

== Club career ==
In 1906, Hilsdon was recommended to then-Chelsea manager John Robertson, who had been advised that Hilsdon would be available for transfer; so enthralled was Robertson with Hilsdon's ability that he promised to turn him into Chelsea's next centre forward. Hilsdon joined Chelsea later that year on £4 a week wages. He scored five goals on his debut in a 9–2 win over Glossop North End, and would later score six in an FA Cup tie with Worksop Town, a club record which remains unequalled. The club programme described him as "living proof that to become a first-class footballer it is not necessary to be born north of the Tweed".

Hilsdon scored 27 goals that season, which helped earn Chelsea promotion to the First Division in their second year of professional football. Within three years he had scored 76 goals in 99 appearances. His later days with Chelsea were hindered by problems with injuries and his personal life, including a battle with alcoholism, though he did score 19 goals in 1910–11. He became the first Chelsea player to score 100 goals, and ended his time there with 108 from 164 games. He is the club's 10th highest goal scorer of all time.

In 1912, Hilsdon returned to West Ham, and was top scorer for them in the 1912–13 season, scoring 17 goals in 36 games. He was known at this point as the "old international", even though he was still only 27 years of age. Hilsdon played for West Ham until 1915, and during his two spells there he recorded 92 Southern League appearances, and scored 35 goals. Hilsdon also played in four World War I games for the East London club. He is also credited with helping the development of young West Ham striker Syd Puddefoot.

== International career ==
Hilsdon received international recognition for England, often playing alongside his Chelsea teammate, Jimmy Windridge. Shortly after joining Chelsea he was selected to play for a Football League XI, for whom he hit a hat-trick in a 6–0 win over the Irish League on his debut. He made his England debut in February 1907, against Ireland. He scored four goals for England in a 7–0 win over Hungary and two apiece in wins over Ireland, Austria, Wales and Bohemia. In all, he scored 14 times in just eight international games for England, eight of his goals coming from games in England's first overseas tour in 1908.

== Military service and later life ==
During the First World War Hilsdon tried to avoid active service and was caught by the police hiding in a chicken run, and was called up. He fought on the Western Front where he was attacked by gas. This affected him greatly, and in the words of his son, he "copped the mustard gas at Arras".

The gas attack caused sufficient damage to Hilsdon to end his footballing career. After the War, he worked as a teaboy on building sites, ran a pub and organised raffles in East End pubs - which were always conveniently won by Hilsdon's wife.

He died in Leicester in 1941; only his son, daughter, son-in-law and grandson attended the funeral. In October 2015 Chelsea supporters raised funds for a headstone to mark his grave. A weather vane modelled on Hilsdon is still a feature of Stamford Bridge, Chelsea's home ground. It was said to cause great misfortune if removed, and when it had to be removed during renovation in the late 1970s, Chelsea suffered financial and footballing difficulties.
