= 1909–10 Chelsea F.C. season =

English football club season

Chelsea
1909–10 season
- Owner: Gus Mears
- Chairman: Claude Kirby
- Manager: David Calderhead
- Stadium: Stamford Bridge
- First Division: 19th
- FA Cup: Second round
- Top goalscorer: League: Jimmy Windridge (6); All: Jimmy Windridge (6)
- Highest home attendance: 70,000 vs Newcastle United (27th Dec 1909)
- Lowest home attendance: 12,000 vs Notts County (1 September 1909)
- Average home league attendance: 30,211
- Biggest win: 4–1 v Bristol City (4th Dec 1909); 4–1 v The Wednesday (9 Apr 1910)
- Biggest defeat: 1–5 v Liverpool (8 Jan 1910)
Home colours	Away colours

The 1909–10 season was Chelsea Football Club's fifth competitive season and fifth year in existence. They club finished 19th in the First Division and were relegated.

== Table ==
Pos	Team	Pld	W	D	L	GF	GA	GAv	Pts	Relegation
16	Bristol City	38	12	8	18	45	60	0.750	32	
17	Middlesbrough	38	11	9	18	56	73	0.767	31	
18	Woolwich Arsenal	38	11	9	18	37	67	0.552	31	
19	Chelsea (R)	38	11	7	20	47	70	0.671	29	Relegation to the Second Division
20	Bolton Wanderers (R)	38	9	6	23	44	71	0.620	24	Relegation to the Second Division

Source: World Football
Rules for classification: 1) Points; 2) Goal average; 3) Goals scored
(R) Relegated
