= 1908–09 Scottish Division One =

16th season of top-tier football league in Scotland

Scottish Division One
- Season: 1908–09
- Champions: Celtic

The 1908–09 Scottish Division One season was won by Celtic by one point over nearest rival Dundee.

The end of the season was complicated by a high number of fixtures which still had to be played before the end of April 1909 due to postponements caused by replays in the Glasgow Cup the previous autumn, a situation made worse by the Scottish Cup final which also had to be replayed. Celtic, who were involved in both those finals, had to play their last eight league matches over a twelve-day period, winning five of these and drawing two to pull ahead of Dundee, who only played once in the same period.

== League table ==
Pos	Team	Pld	W	D	L	GF	GA	GD	Pts
1	Celtic (C)	34	23	5	6	71	24	+47	51
2	Dundee	34	22	6	6	70	32	+38	50
3	Clyde	34	21	6	7	61	37	+24	48
4	Rangers	34	19	7	8	91	38	+53	45
5	Airdrieonians	34	16	9	9	67	46	+21	41
6	Hibernian	34	16	7	11	40	32	+8	39
7	St Mirren	34	15	6	13	53	45	+8	36
8	Aberdeen	34	15	6	13	61	53	+8	36
9	Kilmarnock	34	13	7	14	47	61	−14	33
10	Falkirk	34	13	7	14	58	56	+2	33
11	Heart of Midlothian	34	12	8	14	54	49	+5	32
12	Third Lanark	34	11	10	13	56	49	+7	32
13	Motherwell	34	11	6	17	47	73	−26	28
14	Port Glasgow Athletic	34	10	8	16	39	52	−13	28
15	Queen's Park	34	6	13	15	42	65	−23	25
16	Hamilton Academical	34	6	12	16	42	72	−30	24
17	Morton	34	8	7	19	39	90	−51	23
18	Partick Thistle	34	2	4	28	38	102	−64	8

Source: "1908-1909 Division 1 - SPFL Archive". SPFL.
(C) Champions

== Results ==
Home \ Away	ABE	AIR	CEL	CLY	DND	FAL	HAM	HOM	HIB	KIL	MOR	MOT	PAR	PGA	QPA	RAN	STM	THI
Aberdeen		2–0	0–2	2–4	1–1	3–1	4–2	1–0	4–0	2–0	2–0	1–3	3–2	3–1	1–1	0–2	4–2	6–1
Airdrieonians	4–2		1–2	1–2	2–5	1–1	0–1	2–1	2–1	1–1	4–1	3–0	4–0	1–1	3–3	4–3	3–2	2–2
Celtic	2–0	0–0		0–1	2–0	2–0	1–1	1–1	2–0	5–1	5–1	4–0	3–0	2–1	4–0	2–3	0–1	1–0
Clyde	2–1	0–0	0–2		0–2	6–3	1–0	1–0	2–0	5–2	4–1	1–1	2–0	3–2	1–0	0–1	2–1	2–0
Dundee	2–2	1–0	2–1	1–0		1–1	3–0	2–1	3–0	5–0	1–2	3–1	3–2	1–0	7–1	4–0	4–1	1–0
Falkirk	0–1	0–2	1–1	1–0	3–3		5–3	4–1	0–0	3–1	7–0	4–1	3–1	2–0	1–3	1–0	1–1	1–0
Hamilton Academical	1–2	2–2	1–2	1–3	0–1	3–4		1–1	1–1	0–0	3–1	2–0	4–2	1–1	1–1	0–7	1–0	1–1
Heart of Midlothian	1–1	2–6	1–2	1–1	1–0	1–0	1–0		1–1	0–0	5–0	3–2	1–0	3–0	3–0	0–0	1–2	1–2
Hibernian	2–1	2–0	1–0	1–1	0–1	2–0	2–0	0–1		2–1	4–1	3–0	1–1	1–1	1–0	1–0	2–1	3–0
Kilmarnock	3–2	0–1	3–1	2–1	2–0	3–1	3–1	2–5	0–1		2–1	4–1	1–0	1–0	1–1	0–5	1–1	4–2
Morton	2–3	3–1	0–5	2–4	0–0	1–1	3–3	4–1	1–0	1–1		1–1	1–0	1–2	0–2	1–7	2–0	1–1
Motherwell	3–2	2–4	1–2	0–1	1–4	3–1	2–2	1–6	3–0	2–1	2–1		3–3	1–0	3–3	2–5	1–0	1–0
Partick Thistle	0–1	0–6	0–1	2–3	1–1	1–2	2–4	3–2	1–5	1–4	5–1	2–0		1–3	1–2	0–6	2–3	1–7
Port Glasgow Athletic	1–1	0–1	1–4	0–1	2–3	2–1	0–0	1–0	1–2	2–0	0–2	0–0	2–2		2–1	2–0	3–0	1–1
Queen's Park	2–2	0–3	0–5	0–3	0–2	0–2	1–1	2–2	0–1	0–2	4–0	0–1	5–2	1–2		1–1	1–1	1–1
Rangers	3–1	2–0	1–3	2–2	2–0	4–1	4–0	4–3	0–0	1–1	8–0	3–1	2–0	7–0	2–3		1–1	2–2
St Mirren	1–0	1–1	0–1	4–1	1–2	2–1	5–0	2–0	1–0	3–0	1–2	3–1	4–2	4–1	1–1	1–3		1–0
Third Lanark	2–0	1–2	1–1	1–1	2–1	3–1	6–1	1–3	1–0	4–0	1–1	3–1	7–0	0–4	2–2	1–0	0–1	

Legend: Blue = home team win; Yellow = draw; Red = away team win.
