= Gus Mears =

English businessman and founder of Chelsea F.C. (1873-1912)

- Born: Henry Augustus Mears; 1873; London, United Kingdom
- Died: 4 February 1912 (aged 38–39); London, United Kingdom
- Occupation: Businessman
- Notable work: Founder of Chelsea
- Parent(s): Charlotte Mears (mother); Joseph Mears (father)
- Relatives: Brian Mears (great-nephew)

Henry Augustus Mears (1873 – 4 February 1912) was an English businessman, most notable for founding Chelsea Football Club.

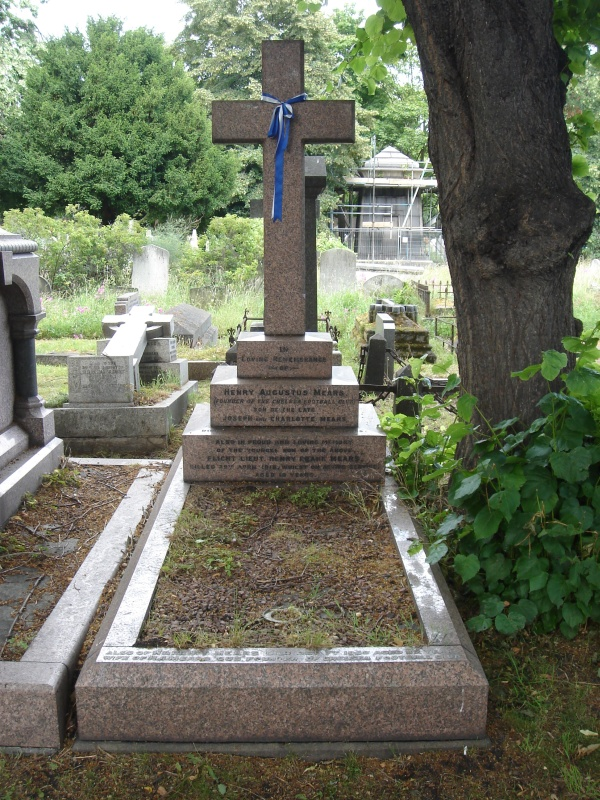
Funerary monument, Brompton Cemetery, London

He was born in 1873, the son of Joseph and Charlotte Mears.

In 1904, Mears and his brother Joseph purchased the Stamford Bridge Athletics Ground and later the nearby market garden with the intention of turning it into the country's finest football ground and staging high-profile matches there. He failed to persuade Fulham FC chairman Henry Norris to re-locate his club to the ground, and considered selling the land to the Great Western Railway Company, who wished to use it as a coal yard.

Mears was ultimately persuaded not to sell up, and instead decided to found his own team, Chelsea, in March, 1905. The story goes that he was on the verge of giving up on the football project when his Scotch Terrier bit his colleague Fred Parker, who still supported the idea. So impressed was Mears with his friend's reaction, he decided to take his advice.

Mears was on the club's first board of directors, but did not live to see the club achieve any success. His dream of making Stamford Bridge one of England's top stadiums was realised, however, as it staged the FA Cup Final from 1920-23. His descendants continued to own the club until 1982, when his great-nephew Brian sold it to Ken Bates.

== Death ==
Mears died in 1912, He is buried at Brompton Cemetery, next to Chelsea's stadium.
