= 1989–90 Chelsea F.C. season =

English football club season

Chelsea F.C.
1989–90 season
- Chairman: Ken Bates
- Manager: Bobby Campbell
- Stadium: Stamford Bridge
- First Division: 5th
- FA Cup: Fourth round
- League Cup: Second round
- Full Members Cup: Winners
- Top goalscorer: League: Kerry Dixon (20); All: Kerry Dixon (25)
Home colours	Away colours	Third colours

During the 1989–90 English football season, Chelsea F.C. competed in the Football League First Division.

The season was the club's 85th year in existence since their foundation in 1905. It was their 54th season within England's highest tier of football and their first season of their current top-flight spell following promotion at the end of the previous season.

== First Division ==
Home club	Score	Away club	Date	League position
Wimbledon	0–1	Chelsea	19 August 1989	8th
Chelsea	1–1	Queens Park Rangers	22 August 1989	6th
Chelsea	4–0	Sheffield Wednesday	26 August 1989	1st
Charlton Athletic	3–0	Chelsea	29 August 1989	5th
Chelsea	2–2	Nottingham Forest	9 September 1989	6th
Tottenham Hotspur	1–4	Chelsea	16 September 1989	4th
Chelsea	1–0	Coventry City	23 September 1989	2nd
Chelsea	0–0	Arsenal	30 September 1989	2nd
Norwich City	2–0	Chelsea	14 October 1989	5th
Derby County	0–1	Chelsea	21 October 1989	4th
Chelsea	1–1	Manchester City	28 October 1989	3rd
Chelsea	4–0	Millwall	4 November 1989	2nd
Everton	0–1	Chelsea	11 November 1989	1st
Chelsea	2–2	Southampton	18 November 1989	2nd
Manchester United	0–0	Chelsea	25 November 1989	4th

Pos	Team	Pld	W	D	L	GF	GA	GD	Pts
3	Tottenham Hotspur	38	19	6	13	59	47	+12	63
4	Arsenal	38	18	8	12	54	38	+16	62
5	Chelsea	38	16	12	10	58	50	+8	60
6	Everton	38	17	8	13	57	46	+11	59
7	Southampton	38	15	10	13	71	63	+8	55

Source: World Football
Rules for classification: 1) Points; 2) Goal difference; 3) Goals scored

== Squad ==
Note: Flags indicate national team as defined under FIFA eligibility rules; some limited exceptions apply. Players may hold more than one non-FIFA nationality.

Pos.	Nation	Player
GK	ENG	Dave Beasant
GK	ENG	Kevin Hitchcock
GK	WAL	Roger Freestone (out on loan from September)
DF	ENG	Tony Dorigo
DF	ENG	David Lee
DF	ENG	Graham Roberts
DF	WAL	Gareth Hall
DF	SCO	Steve Clarke
DF	NOR	Erland Johnsen
DF	SUR	Ken Monkou
MF	ENG	Graeme Le Saux
MF	ENG	John Bumstead

Pos.	Nation	Player
MF	ENG	Alan Dickens
MF	ENG	Micky Hazard
MF	ENG	Damian Matthew
MF	ENG	Graham Stuart
MF	ENG	Clive Wilson
MF	WAL	Peter Nicholas
MF	SCO	Craig Burley
MF	SCO	Kevin McAllister
FW	ENG	Kerry Dixon
FW	SCO	Gordon Durie
FW	NIR	Kevin Wilson

== Transfers ==
=== Out ===
- Joe McLaughlin - Charlton Athletic, £650,000
- Micky Hazard - Portsmouth
- Billy Dodds - Dundee
- Dave Mitchell - NEC Nijmegen

== Top scorers ==
- Kerry Dixon 20
- Kevin Wilson 14
- Gordon Durie 5
- Steve Clarke 3
- Tony Dorigo 3
- Graham Roberts 3
- John Bumstead 2
- Alan Dickens 1
- Gareth Hall 1
- Graeme Le Saux 1
- David Lee 1
- Kevin McAllister 1
- Ken Monkou 1
- Peter Nicholas 1
- Graham Stuart 1
