= 1991–92 Chelsea F.C. season =

English football club season

Chelsea
1991–92 season
- Chairman: Ken Bates
- Manager: Ian Porterfield
- Stadium: Stamford Bridge
- First Division: 14th
- FA Cup: Quarter finals
- League Cup: Second round
- Full Members Cup: Southern Area final
- Top goalscorer: Wise (14)
- Average home league attendance: 18,686
Home colours	Away colours	Third colours

The 1991–92 season saw Chelsea F.C. compete in the last season of the Football League First Division before its rebranding as the FA Premier League.

== Season summary ==
In the summer of 1991, Bobby Campbell was succeeded as team manager by first team coach Ian Porterfield. The 1991–92 season looked promising for Chelsea and were in 6th place at the beginning of February with a possible destination of European football but only three wins in their final 15 league games of the season saw Chelsea finish in 14th place.

== Final league table ==
Pos	Team	Pld	W	D	L	GF	GA	GD	Pts	Qualification or relegation
12	Everton	42	13	14	15	52	51	+1	53	Qualification for the FA Premier League
13	Wimbledon	42	13	14	15	53	53	0	53	Qualification for the FA Premier League
14	Chelsea	42	13	14	15	50	60	−10	53	Qualification for the FA Premier League
15	Tottenham Hotspur	42	15	7	20	58	63	−5	52	Qualification for the FA Premier League
16	Southampton	42	14	10	18	39	55	−16	52	Qualification for the FA Premier League

Source: World Football
Rules for classification: 1) Points; 2) Goal difference; 3) Goals scored

== Results ==
Chelsea's score comes first

=== Legend ===
Win	Draw	Loss

=== Football League First Division ===
Date	Opponent	Venue	Result	Attendance	Scorers
17 August 1991	Wimbledon	H	2–2	22,574	Elliott, Allon
21 August 1991	Oldham Athletic	A	0–3	14,997	
24 August 1991	Tottenham Hotspur	A	3–1	34,645	Dixon, Wilson, Townsend
28 August 1991	Notts County	H	2–2	15,847	Elliott, Allon
31 August 1991	Luton Town	H	4–1	17,457	Le Saux, Townsend, Dixon, Wise
3 September 1991	Sheffield United	A	1–0	17,400	Wise
7 September 1991	West Ham United	A	1–1	18,875	Dixon
14 September 1991	Leeds United	H	0–1	23,439	
18 September 1991	Aston Villa	H	2–0	17,182	Jones, Townsend
21 September 1991	Queens Park Rangers	A	2–2	19,579	Townsend, Wise
28 September 1991	Everton	H	2–2	19,038	Wilson, Wise
5 October 1991	Arsenal	A	2–3	42,074	Le Saux, Wise
19 October 1991	Liverpool	H	2–2	30,230	Jones, Myers
26 October 1991	Crystal Palace	A	0–0	21,841	
2 November 1991	Coventry City	A	1–0	11,343	Le Saux
16 November 1991	Norwich City	H	0–3	15,755	
23 November 1991	Southampton	A	0–1	14,933	
30 November 1991	Nottingham Forest	H	1–0	19,420	Dixon
7 December 1991	Sheffield Wednesday	A	0–3	27,383	
15 December 1991	Manchester United	H	1–3	23,120	Allen
21 December 1991	Oldham Athletic	H	4–2	13,136	Wise (pen), Allen (2), Elliott
26 December 1991	Notts County	A	0–2	11,933	
28 December 1991	Luton Town	A	0–2	10,738	
1 January 1992	Manchester City	H	1–1	18,196	Allen
11 January 1992	Tottenham Hotspur	H	2–0	28,628	Allen, Wise
18 January 1992	Wimbledon	A	2–1	8,413	Townsend, Allen
1 February 1992	Liverpool	A	2–1	38,681	Jones, Wise
8 February 1992	Crystal Palace	H	1–1	17,810	Cascarino
12 February 1992	Southampton	H	1–1	7,148	Townsend
22 February 1992	Nottingham Forest	A	1–1	24,095	Allen
26 February 1992	Manchester United	A	1–1	44,872	Donaghy (own goal)
29 February 1992	Sheffield Wednesday	H	0–3	17,538	
11 March 1992	Norwich City	A	1–0	13,430	Dixon
14 March 1992	Coventry City	H	0–1	10,962	
21 March 1992	Sheffield United	H	1–2	11,247	Cundy
28 March 1992	Manchester City	A	0–0	23,633	
4 April 1992	West Ham United	H	2–1	20,684	Wise, Cascarino
11 April 1992	Leeds United	A	0–3	31,363	
18 April 1992	Queens Park Rangers	H	2–1	18,952	Clarke, Wise (pen)
20 April 1992	Aston Villa	A	1–3	19,269	Sinclair
25 April 1992	Arsenal	H	1–1	26,003	Wise
2 May 1992	Everton	A	1–2	20,163	Newton

=== FA Cup ===
Round	Date	Opponent	Venue	Result	Attendance	Goalscorers
R3	4 January 1992	Hull City	A	2–0	13,580	Jones, Wise
R4	26 January 1992	Everton	H	1–0	21,152	Allen
R5	15 February 1992	Sheffield United	H	1–0	34,447	Stuart
QF	9 March 1992	Sunderland	H	1–1	33,948	Allen
QFR	18 March 1992	Sunderland	A	1–2	26,039	Wise

=== League Cup ===
Round	Date	Opponent	Venue	Result	Attendance	Goalscorers
R2 1st leg	25 September 1991	Tranmere Rovers	H	1–1	11,311	Townsend
R2 2nd leg	8 October 1991	Tranmere Rovers	A	1–3 (lost 2–4 on agg)	11,165	Wise

=== Full Members Cup ===
Round	Date	Opponent	Venue	Result	Attendance	Goalscorers
R2	23 October 1991	Swindon Town	H	1–0	5,784	Jones
R3	26 November 1991	Ipswich Town	H	2–2 (won 4–3 on pens)	6,325	Jones, Allon
Area SF	10 December 1991	Crystal Palace	A	1–0	8,416	Dixon
S Area F 1st leg	21 January 1992	Southampton	A	0–2	8,726	
S Area F 2nd leg	29 January 1992	Southampton	H	1–3 (lost 1–5 on agg)	9,781	Wise (pen) 37'

== Squad ==
Note: Flags indicate national team as defined under FIFA eligibility rules; some limited exceptions apply. Players may hold more than one non-FIFA nationality.

Pos.	Nation	Player
GK	ENG	Kevin Hitchcock
DF	SCO	Steve Clarke
DF	ENG	Paul Elliott
DF	NED	Ken Monkou
DF	ENG	Graeme Le Saux
MF	ENG	Dennis Wise
MF	IRL	Andy Townsend
MF	WAL	Vinnie Jones
FW	ENG	Kerry Dixon
FW	ENG	Kevin Wilson
FW	ENG	Clive Allen
DF	SCO	Tom Boyd
MF	ENG	Graham Stuart
GK	ENG	Dave Beasant
DF	ENG	Jason Cundy
DF	WAL	Gareth Hall

Pos.	Nation	Player
FW	IRL	Tony Cascarino
DF	ENG	Andy Myers
DF	JAM	Frank Sinclair
MF	ENG	Alan Dickens
MF	SCO	Craig Burley
DF	NOR	Erland Johnsen
MF	ENG	Damian Matthew
FW	ENG	Joe Allon
DF	WAL	Darren Barnard
DF	ENG	David Lee
GK	WAL	Roger Freestone
DF	ENG	Ian Pearce
MF	ENG	Eddie Newton
MF	ENG	Michael Gilkes
MF	ENG	Nigel Spackman

== Transfers ==
=== In ===
Date	Pos	Name	From	Fee
27 June 1991	DF	Tom Boyd	Motherwell	£800,000
14 August 1991	FW	Joe Allon	Hartlepool United	£250,000
30 August 1991	MF	Vinnie Jones	Sheffield United	£575,000
6 December 1991	FW	Clive Allen	Manchester City	£250,000

=== Out ===
Date	Pos	Name	To	Fee
6 June 1991	DF	Tony Dorigo	Leeds United	£1,300,000
13 August 1991	MF	Kevin McAllister	Falkirk	£225,000
16 August 1991	FW	Gordon Durie	Tottenham Hotspur	£2,200,000
5 September 1991	GK	Roger Freestone	Swansea City	£45,000
6 February 1992	DF	Tom Boyd	Celtic	£750,000
27 March 1992	FW	Clive Allen	West Ham United	£275,000
27 March 1992	FW	Kevin Wilson	Notts County	£225,000

Transfers in: ▼£1,875,000
Transfers out: ▲£5,020,000
Total spending: ▲£3,145,000
