= 1990–91 Chelsea F.C. season =

English football club season

Chelsea
1990–91 season
- Chairman: Ken Bates
- Manager: Bobby Campbell
- Stadium: Stamford Bridge
- First Division: 11th
- FA Cup: Third round
- League Cup: Semi-finals
- Full Members Cup: Quarter-finals (Southern Area)
- Player of the Year: Andy Townsend
- Top goalscorer: League: Gordon Durie (12 goals); All: Kerry Dixon; Durie (15 each)
- Highest home attendance: 34,178 vs Tottenham Hotspur (16 Jan 1991, League Cup)
- Lowest home attendance: 3,849 vs Luton Town (18 Feb 1991, Full Members Cup)
- Average home league attendance: 20,738
Home colours	Away colours	Third colours

During the 1990–91 English football season, Chelsea F.C. competed in the Football League First Division.

== Season summary ==
In the 1990–91 season, the league campaign was proven to be a disappointment despite recruiting the club's first million pound players, Dennis Wise and Andy Townsend, as Chelsea finished 11th in the First Division and were knocked out of both cups by lower league opposition. As a result, Campbell was relieved of his duties at the end of the season and was appointed personal assistant to chairman Ken Bates.

== Final league table ==
Pos	Team	Pld	W	D	L	GF	GA	GD	Pts	Qualification or relegation
9	Everton	38	13	12	13	50	46	+4	51	
10	Tottenham Hotspur	38	11	16	11	51	50	+1	49	Qualification for the Cup Winners' Cup qualifying round
11	Chelsea	38	13	10	15	58	69	−11	49	
12	Queens Park Rangers	38	12	10	16	44	53	−9	46	
13	Sheffield United	38	13	7	18	36	55	−19	46	

Source: World Football
Rules for classification: 1) Points; 2) Goal difference; 3) Goals scored

Results summary

Overall								Home						Away					
Pld	W	D	L	GF	GA	GD	Pts	W	D	L	GF	GA	GD	W	D	L	GF	GA	GD
38	13	10	15	58	69	−11	49	10	6	3	33	25	+8	3	4	12	25	44	−19

Source: Statto

Results by round

Round	1	2	3	4	5	6	7	8	9	10	11	12	13	14	15	16	17	18	19	20	21	22	23	24	25	26	27	28	29	30	31	32	33	34	35	36	37	38
Ground	H	A	A	H	A	H	H	A	H	A	H	H	A	A	H	H	A	H	A	A	H	H	A	H	A	H	A	H	A	H	H	A	H	A	A	A	H	A
Result	W	L	L	W	L	D	D	D	D	L	W	D	L	W	W	W	W	W	L	L	L	W	L	W	L	D	D	W	L	L	L	L	D	D	W	L	W	D
Position	7	8	13	9	13	12	13	13	14	15	11	11	14	11	9	9	7	6	7	8	8	7	9	9	9	9	9	8	8	9	9	10	10	11	9	10	10	10

Source: Statto.com
A = Away; H = Home; W = Win; D = Draw; L = Loss

== Results ==
Chelsea's score comes first

=== Legend ===
Win	Draw	Loss

=== Football League First Division ===
Date	Opponent	Venue	Result	Attendance	Scorers
25 August 1990	Derby County	H	2–1	25,835	Lee, Nicholas
28 August 1990	Crystal Palace	A	1–2	27,101	Dorigo
1 September 1990	Queens Park Rangers	A	0–1	19,813	
8 September 1990	Sunderland	H	3–2	19,424	Wise (pen), Dixon, Wilson
15 September 1990	Arsenal	A	1–4	41,516	Wilson
22 September 1990	Manchester City	H	1–1	20,924	Wilson
29 September 1990	Sheffield United	H	2–2	19,873	Wilson (2)
6 October 1990	Southampton	A	3–3	16,911	Clarke, Wise (pen), Wilson
20 October 1990	Nottingham Forest	H	0–0	22,403	
27 October 1990	Liverpool	A	0–2	38,463	
3 November 1990	Aston Villa	H	1–0	23,555	Le Saux
10 November 1990	Norwich City	H	1–1	16,925	Wise (pen)
17 November 1990	Wimbledon	A	1–2	10,773	Durie
25 November 1990	Manchester United	A	3–2	37,836	Pallister (own goal), Townsend, Wise (pen)
1 December 1990	Tottenham Hotspur	H	3–2	33,478	Bumstead, Dixon, Durie
8 December 1990	Crystal Palace	H	2–1	21,558	Stuart, Durie
15 December 1990	Derby County	A	6–4	15,057	Le Saux, Dixon (2), Durie (2), Wise
22 December 1990	Coventry City	H	2–1	16,317	Townsend, Wise
26 December 1990	Leeds United	A	1–4	30,893	Dixon
29 December 1990	Luton Town	A	0–2	11,050	
1 January 1991	Everton	H	1–2	18,351	Wilson
12 January 1991	Queens Park Rangers	H	2–0	19,255	Durie (2)
19 January 1991	Sunderland	A	0–1	20,038	
2 February 1991	Arsenal	H	2–1	29,094	Stuart, Dixon
9 February 1991	Manchester City	A	1–2	25,116	Wise
16 February 1991	Wimbledon	H	0–0	13,378	
2 March 1991	Tottenham Hotspur	A	1–1	26,168	Durie
9 March 1991	Manchester United	H	3–2	22,818	Dorigo, Monkou, Durie
16 March 1991	Sheffield United	A	0–1	20,581	
23 March 1991	Southampton	H	0–2	13,391	
30 March 1991	Leeds United	H	1–2	17,585	Le Saux
1 April 1991	Coventry City	A	0–1	14,272	
6 April 1991	Luton Town	H	3–3	12,603	Le Saux, Stuart, Wise
13 April 1991	Everton	A	2–2	19,526	Dixon (2)
17 April 1991	Norwich City	A	3–1	12,301	Durie (2), Wise
20 April 1991	Nottingham Forest	A	0–7	20,305	
4 May 1991	Liverpool	H	4–2	32,266	Dixon (2), Wise (pen), Durie
11 May 1991	Aston Villa	A	2–2	27,866	Cundy, Stuart

=== FA Cup ===
Round	Date	Opponent	Venue	Result	Attendance	Goalscorers
R3	5 January 1991	Oxford United	H	1–3	14,586	Dixon

=== League Cup ===
Round	Date	Opponent	Venue	Result	Attendance	Goalscorers
R2 1st Leg	26 September 1990	Walsall	A	5–0	5,666	Townsend (2), McAllister, Dixon, Wilson
R2 2nd Leg	10 October 1990	Walsall	H	4–1 (won 9–1 on agg)	10,037	Dixon (2), Durie, Le Saux
R3	31 October 1990	Portsmouth	H	0–0	16,699	
R3R	6 November 1990	Portsmouth	A	3–2	16,085	Lee, Wise (pen), Wilson
R4	28 November 1990	Oxford United	A	2–1	9,789	Durie (2)
QF	16 January 1991	Tottenham Hotspur	H	0–0	34,178	
QFR	23 January 1991	Tottenham Hotspur	A	3–0	33,861	Townsend, Dixon, Wise (pen)
SF 1st Leg	24 February 1991	Sheffield Wednesday	H	0–2	34,074	
SF 2nd Leg	27 February 1991	Sheffield Wednesday	A	1–3 (lost 1–5 on agg)	34,669	Stuart

=== Full Members Cup ===
Round	Date	Opponent	Venue	Result	Attendance	Goalscorers
SR2	12 December 1990	Swindon Town	H	1–0	5,888	Wise (pen)
SQF	18 February 1991	Luton Town	H	1–1 (lost 1–4 on pens)	3,849	Stuart

== Squad ==
Note: Flags indicate national team as defined under FIFA eligibility rules; some limited exceptions apply. Players may hold more than one non-FIFA nationality.

Pos.	Nation	Player
GK	ENG	Dave Beasant
GK	WAL	Roger Freestone
GK	ENG	Kevin Hitchcock
DF	WAL	Darren Barnard
DF	SCO	Steve Clarke
DF	ENG	Jason Cundy
DF	ENG	Tony Dorigo
DF	WAL	Gareth Hall
DF	NOR	Erland Johnsen
DF	ENG	David Lee
DF	NED	Ken Monkou
DF	ENG	Andy Myers
DF	ENG	Ian Pearce
DF	JAM	Frank Sinclair

Pos.	Nation	Player
MF	ENG	Graeme Le Saux
MF	ENG	John Bumstead
MF	SCO	Craig Burley
MF	ENG	Alan Dickens
MF	ENG	Damian Matthew
MF	SCO	Kevin McAllister
MF	ENG	Eddie Newton
MF	WAL	Peter Nicholas (captain)
MF	ENG	Graham Stuart
MF	IRL	Andy Townsend (vice-captain)
MF	ENG	Dennis Wise
FW	ENG	Kerry Dixon
FW	SCO	Gordon Durie
FW	AUS	Dave Mitchell
FW	NIR	Kevin Wilson

== Transfers ==
=== In ===
Date	Pos	Name	from	Fee
3 July 1990	MF	Dennis Wise	Wimbledon	£1,600,000
5 July 1990	MF	Andy Townsend	Norwich City	£1,200,000
25 July 1990	MF	Darren Barnard	Wokingham Town	£100,000

=== Out ===
Date	Pos	Name	To	Fee
4 July 1990	MF	Clive Wilson	Queens Park Rangers	£450,000
20 August 1990	FW	Nathan Blake	Cardiff City	Free transfer

Transfers in: ▼£2,900,000
Transfers out: ▲£450,000
Total spending: ▼£2,450,000
