= 1990 Full Members' Cup final =

Chelsea	Middlesbrough
1	0
- Date: 25 March 1990
- Venue: Wembley Stadium, London
- Referee: Roger Milford
- Attendance: 76,369

The 1990 Full Members' Cup final, also known by its sponsored name, the Zenith Data Systems Cup, was a football match which took place at Wembley Stadium on 25 March 1990. It was contested between First Division Chelsea and Second Division Middlesbrough. Chelsea's Tony Dorigo scored the only goal of the match with a long-range free kick.

== Match details ==
25 March 1990
15:00 BST

Chelsea	1–0	Middlesbrough
Dorigo 26'

Wembley Stadium, London
Attendance: 76,369
Referee: Roger Milford (Bristol)

Chelsea	Middlesbrough

CHELSEA:
GK	1	(England) Dave Beasant
RB	2	(Wales) Gareth Hall
LB	3	(England) Tony Dorigo
CM	4	(England) John Bumstead
CB	5	(Norway) Erland Johnsen
CB	6	(Netherlands) Ken Monkou
CM	7	(Scotland) Kevin McAllister
CM	8	(Wales) Peter Nicholas (c)
FW	9	(England) Kerry Dixon
FW	10	(Scotland) Gordon Durie
FW	11	(Northern Ireland) Kevin Wilson
Substitutes:
MF	12	(England) David Lee
MF	14	(England) Clive Wilson
Manager:
(England) Bobby Campbell

MIDDLESBROUGH:
GK	1	(England) Stephen Pears
RB	2	(England) Gary Parkinson
LB	3	(England) Colin Cooper
CB	4	(Republic of Ireland) Alan Kernaghan
CB	5	(England) Simon Coleman
RM	6	(England) Owen McGee
CF	7	(Republic of Ireland) Bernie Slaven
CM	8	(England) Mark Proctor (c)
CF	9	(England) Stuart Ripley
CM	10	(England) Mark Brennan
LM	11	(England) Peter Davenport
Substitutes:
CF	12	(England) Paul Kerr
MF	13	(England) Nicky Mohan
Manager:
(England) Colin Todd

MATCH RULES

- 90 minutes.
- 30 minutes of extra-time if necessary.
- Penalty shootout if scores still level.
- Two named substitutes.
- Maximum of two substitutions.
