= Jason Cundy =

English footballer (born 1969)

Personal information
- Full name: Jason Victor Cundy
- Date of birth: 12 November 1969 (age 56)
- Place of birth: Wandsworth, England
- Height: 6 ft 0 in (1.83 m)
- Position: Centre-back

Youth career
- 1981–1988: Chelsea

Senior career*
Years	Team	Apps	(Gls)
1988–1992	Chelsea	41	(2)
1992	→ Tottenham Hotspur (loan)	10	(0)
1992–1996	Tottenham Hotspur	18	(1)
1995	→ Crystal Palace (loan)	4	(0)
1996	→ Bristol City (loan)	6	(1)
1996	→ Ipswich Town (loan)	3	(1)
1996–1999	Ipswich Town	55	(4)
1999–2000	Portsmouth	9	(0)
Total		146	(9)

International career
1990–1991	England U21	3	(1)
- * Club domestic league appearances and goals

Jason Victor Cundy (born 12 November 1969) is an English former professional footballer and radio broadcaster for Talksport who currently co-hosts The Sports Bar with Jamie O'Hara.

As a player, he was a centre-back, who notably played in the Premier League for Chelsea and Tottenham Hotspur. He also played in the Football League for Crystal Palace, Bristol City, Ipswich Town and Portsmouth. He was capped three times by England U21, scoring once.

Since retirement he has worked as a broadcaster. He presents The Sports Bar on Talksport, Jason Cundy Kicks Off on London Live as well as commentating and presenting for Chelsea TV.

== Playing career ==
Cundy was born in the London Borough of Wandsworth on 12 November 1969 and attended Rutlish School in Merton Park between 1981 and 1986. He was a talented young footballer and was chosen to represent the London Borough of Merton Schools team. He was part of a talented age group that included Neil Sullivan and Graham Stuart, with the side reaching the final of the English Schools’ Trophy in 1985, losing 2-1 to Doncaster over two-legs.

Cundy joined his "boyhood" club Chelsea as an eleven year-old and progressed through the youth system, being awarded the club's Young Player of the Year in 1987. He signed his first professional contract a year later and made the first team matchday squad for the first time on 9 October 1988, remaining an unused substitute in the 1–1 draw with Swindon Town in Second Division.

Cundy is remembered for the "freak" goal that he scored against Ipswich Town in a Premiership match for Tottenham, in 1992–93. In an attempt to kick the ball 40 yards from goal, he slipped and managed a wind-assisted effort that ended up flying over 'keeper Craig Forrest and into the back of the net. The goal was captured live on Sky Sports and put Spurs 1–0 up, in a match that finished 1–1.

Cundy was forced to retire in 2000 due to a knee injury, and subsequently became a presenter on Talksport, regularly appearing with Ian Danter and Alvin Martin on Football First. He also occasionally co-hosted Evening Kick-Off, subbing in for any regular member, while appearing regularly as a presenter/pundit on Chelsea TV. He currently co-hosts The Sports Bar with Jamie O'Hara on weeknights. Cundy is popular for his signature catchphrase "Has anyone seen... [insert team and/or person]" followed by ducks quacking.

== Media career ==
Cundy presents The Sports Bar on Talksport and Jason Cundy Kicks Off on London Live as well as commentating and presenting for Chelsea TV. Cundy was also the co-founder of the classic section of the Sports Bar "Turnip of the Week".

On Saturday, 18 October 2008, Cundy went on holiday and was unavailable to appear on his TalkSport show, Talksport radio DJ Andy Goldstein erroneously reporting that he had died after falling off a boat and drowning. The report, which Goldstein later admitted was meant as a joke, resulted in several fans of Chelsea Football Club putting down flowers outside Stamford Bridge the following day.

== Personal life ==
In 1994 he married Lizzie Miller and they had a son.

In February 1997, just after his transfer to Ipswich Town, he was diagnosed with testicular cancer and had surgery the following day to remove a testicle. It had been announced that he was absent from the team due to a shin injury. Despite the cancer, in May 2000 he and Lizzie had a second son. He separated from Lizzie in 2010, and they divorced in December 2012.

In June 2015, Cundy married Hannah Pedley, and they had a son using sperm he had frozen when he was first diagnosed with testicular cancer 18 years earlier.

Cundy helped start the Cancer Campaign in Suffolk and raised thousands of pounds for cancer charities and awareness of the disease. Cundy has also spoken out in support of the charity Act Against Bullying.

== Career statistics ==
Source: Jason Cundy at the English National Football Archive (subscription required)

Appearances and goals by club, season and competition
Club	Season	League			FA Cup		League Cup		Other		Total	
Club	Season	Division	Apps	Goals	Apps	Goals	Apps	Goals	Apps	Goals	Apps	Goals
Chelsea	1988–89	Second Division	0	0	0	0	0	0	0	0	0	0
Chelsea	1989–90	First Division	0	0	0	0	0	0	0	0	0	0
Chelsea	1990–91	First Division	29	1	1	0	6	0	2 (Note: Appearances in Full Members' Cup)	0	38	1
Chelsea	1991–92	First Division	12	1	5	0	0	0	2	0	19	1
Chelsea	Total		41	2	6	0	6	0	4	0	57	2
Career total			41	2	6	0	6	0	4	0	57	2
