= 1992–93 Chelsea F.C. season =

English football club season

Chelsea F.C.
1992–93 season
- Chairman: Ken Bates
- Manager: Ian Porterfield (until 15 February); David Webb (from 15 February)
- Stadium: Stamford Bridge
- FA Premier League: 11th
- FA Cup: Third round
- League Cup: Quarter-finals
- Top goalscorer: League: Harford/Stuart (9); All: Harford (11)
- Average home league attendance: 18,787
Home colours	Away colours	Third colours

During the 1992–93 English football season, Chelsea F.C. competed in the inaugural season of the FA Premier League.

The season was the club's 88th year in existence since their foundation in 1905. It was their 58th season within England's highest tier of football and their fourth season of their current top-flight spell following promotion at the end of the 1988–89 season.

== Season summary ==
Chelsea started the season well and stood second after 19 games, but went into freefall after that, going 12 matches without a win, a run that pulled Chelsea down to 12th, replacing hopes of a title challenge with relegation fears. Manager Ian Porterfield paid for the team's poor form by becoming the first manager to be sacked in the new Premier League on 15 February. He was replaced by David Webb, the scorer of the Chelsea winner that won the 1970 FA Cup Final. Webb managed to steer Chelsea to safety, but his contract was not renewed by the board. Instead, they appointed former Tottenham legend Glenn Hoddle, who had just taken Swindon Town to their first ever top-flight campaign, as player-manager.

The club ended the season with 56 points, having won 14, drawn 14 and lost 14 matches. By finishing 11th of 22 clubs, it was Chelsea's first top-half finish since coming 5th in 1989–90. With 54 goals conceded, this was Chelsea's best defence in the top flight, a record broken next season as well.

Chelsea went out in the third round of the FA Cup this season, beaten 2–1 by Middlesbrough away at Ayresome Park.

== Kit ==
Chelsea retained the previous season's home kit, manufactured by Umbro and sponsored by Commodore. It featured a geometric pattern on the players' right shoulder, repeated on the left leg of the shorts, an Umbro trademark of the time also used by Everton and Manchester United's home shirts of the same time. For this season, Chelsea re-introduced white socks as first choice for the first time since 1984–85. White socks had been introduced by Tommy Docherty for Chelsea in 1965, to make Chelsea stand out among other clubs wearing blue shirts, white shorts and blue socks.

The away kit was based on football kits of the game's early days as part of a nostalgia craze following the 1990 World Cup. It was a white shirt with red pinstripes, red shorts and socks. Its laces were also worn on the Umbro home kits of Aston Villa and Sheffield United. The Chelsea lion badge was included in a blue shield; the kits for next season retained this style. The kit was the final one in which Chelsea wore a red garment, the colour having been a popular away kit throughout the 1970s and 1980s.

Chelsea wore a third kit of all-yellow with a blue collar and pattern on the front, also worn by Everton. The kit was from an Umbro range called Porto.

== Transfers ==
=== In ===
No.	Pos.	Player	From	Date	Fee
Summer
	DF	(Northern Ireland) Mal Donaghy	(England) Manchester United	1 July 1992	£100,800
	FW	(Scotland) John Spencer	(Scotland) Rangers	1 July 1992	free transfer
	GK	(Republic of Ireland) Nick Colgan	(Republic of Ireland) Drogheda United	1 July 1992	undisclosed
	FW	(Scotland) Robert Fleck	(England) Norwich City	1 July 1992	undisclosed

== Final league table ==
Pos	Team	Pld	W	D	L	GF	GA	GD	Pts	Qualification or relegation
9	Manchester City	42	15	12	15	56	51	+5	57	
10	Arsenal	42	15	11	16	40	38	+2	56	Qualification for the Cup Winners' Cup first round (Note: Arsenal qualified by winning the FA Cup and therefore did not take up their UEFA Cup spot for winning the League Cup, which reverted to the league.)
11	Chelsea	42	14	14	14	51	54	−3	56	
12	Wimbledon	42	14	12	16	56	55	+1	54	
13	Everton	42	15	8	19	53	55	−2	53	

Source: Premier League
Rules for classification: 1) points; 2) goal difference; 3) number of goals scored.

== Results ==
Chelsea's score comes first

=== Legend ===
Win	Draw	Loss

=== FA Premier League ===
Date	Opponent	Venue	Result	Attendance	Scorers
15 August 1992	Oldham Athletic	H	1–1	20,699	Harford
19 August 1992	Norwich City	A	1–2	15,164	Stuart
22 August 1992	Sheffield Wednesday	A	3–3	26,338	Jones, Stuart, Newton
26 August 1992	Blackburn Rovers	H	0–0	19,575	
29 August 1992	Queens Park Rangers	H	1–0	22,910	Harford
2 September 1992	Aston Villa	A	3–1	19,125	Fleck, Newton, Wise
5 September 1992	Liverpool	A	1–2	34,199	Harford
12 September 1992	Norwich City	H	2–3	16,880	Harford, Townsend
20 September 1992	Manchester City	A	1–0	22,420	Harford
26 September 1992	Nottingham Forest	H	0–0	19,760	
3 October 1992	Arsenal	A	1–2	27,780	Wise
17 October 1992	Ipswich Town	H	2–1	16,707	Hall, Harford
24 October 1992	Coventry City	A	2–1	15,626	Harford, Stuart
31 October 1992	Sheffield United	H	1–2	13,763	Townsend
7 November 1992	Crystal Palace	H	3–1	17,141	Shaw (own goal), Stuart, Harford
21 November 1992	Everton	A	1–0	17,418	Fleck
29 November 1992	Leeds United	H	1–0	24,345	Townsend
5 December 1992	Tottenham Hotspur	A	2–1	31,540	Newton (2)
11 December 1992	Middlesbrough	A	0–0	15,599	
19 December 1992	Manchester United	H	1–1	34,464	Lee
26 December 1992	Southampton	H	1–1	18,344	Newton
28 December 1992	Wimbledon	A	0–0	14,687	
9 January 1993	Manchester City	H	2–4	15,939	Stuart, Spencer
16 January 1993	Nottingham Forest	A	0–3	23,249	
27 January 1993	Queens Park Rangers	A	1–1	15,806	Spencer
30 January 1993	Sheffield Wednesday	H	0–2	16,261	
6 February 1993	Oldham Athletic	A	1–3	11,772	Harford
10 February 1993	Liverpool	H	0–0	20,981	
13 February 1993	Aston Villa	H	0–1	20,081	
21 February 1993	Blackburn Rovers	A	0–2	14,780	
1 March 1993	Arsenal	H	1–0	17,725	Stuart
10 March 1993	Everton	H	2–1	12,739	Stuart, Spencer
15 March 1993	Crystal Palace	A	1–1	12,610	Stuart
20 March 1993	Tottenham Hotspur	H	1–1	25,157	Cascarino
24 March 1993	Leeds United	A	1–1	28,135	Donaghy
3 April 1993	Middlesbrough	H	4–0	13,043	Donaghy, Spencer, Stuart, Barnard
6 April 1993	Ipswich Town	A	1–1	17,444	Spencer
10 April 1993	Southampton	A	0–1	15,135	
12 April 1993	Wimbledon	H	4–2	13,138	Wise (pen), Hall, Spencer, Shipperley
17 April 1993	Manchester United	A	0–3	40,139	
1 May 1993	Coventry City	H	2–1	14,186	Spencer, Cascarino
8 May 1993	Sheffield United	A	2–4	24,850	Lee, Townsend

=== FA Cup ===
Round	Date	Opponent	Venue	Result	Attendance	Goalscorers
R3	2 January 1993	Middlesbrough	A	1–2	16,776	Mohan (own goal)

=== League Cup ===
Round	Date	Opponent	Venue	Result	Attendance	Goalscorers
R2 First Leg	23 September 1992	Walsall	A	3–0	5,510	Wise 15', Newton 28', Townsend 78'
R2 Second Leg	7 October 1992	Walsall	H	1–0 (won 4–0 on agg)	7,646	Fleck (pen) 73'
R3	28 October 1992	Newcastle United	H	2–1	30,193	Sinclair 59', Harford 82'
R4	2 December 1992	Everton	A	2–2	14,457	Harford 28', Stuart 79'
R4R	16 December 1992	Everton	H	1–0	19,496	Townsend 19'
QF	6 January 1993	Crystal Palace	A	1–3	28,510	Townsend 18'

== First-team squad ==
Note: Flags indicate national team as defined under FIFA eligibility rules; some limited exceptions apply. Players may hold more than one non-FIFA nationality.

Pos.	Nation	Player
GK	ENG	Dave Beasant
GK	ENG	Alec Chamberlain (on loan from Luton Town)
GK	IRL	Nick Colgan
GK	ENG	Kevin Hitchcock
GK	RUS	Dmitri Kharine
GK	IRL	Gerry Peyton (on loan from Everton)
DF	ENG	Anthony Barness
DF	ENG	Paul Elliott
DF	ENG	David Lee
DF	ENG	Andy Myers
DF	ENG	Ian Pearce
DF	ENG	Frank Sinclair
DF	WAL	Darren Barnard
DF	WAL	Gareth Hall
DF	SCO	Steve Clarke
DF	NIR	Mal Donaghy

Pos.	Nation	Player
DF	NOR	Erland Johnsen
MF	SCO	Craig Burley
MF	SCO	David Hopkin
MF	ENG	Damian Matthew
MF	ENG	Eddie Newton
MF	ENG	Nigel Spackman
MF	ENG	Graham Stuart
MF	IRL	Andy Townsend
MF	ENG	Dennis Wise (captain)
FW	ENG	Mick Harford
FW	ENG	Steve Livingstone
FW	ENG	Neil Shipperley
FW	SCO	Robert Fleck
FW	SCO	John Spencer .
FW	IRL	Tony Cascarino

=== Left club during season ===
Note: Flags indicate national team as defined under FIFA eligibility rules; some limited exceptions apply. Players may hold more than one non-FIFA nationality.

Pos.	Nation	Player
DF	ENG	Graeme Le Saux (to Blackburn Rovers)
MF	ENG	Vinnie Jones (to Wimbledon)

Pos.	Nation	Player
FW	ENG	Joe Allon (to Brentford)
