= List of Chelsea F.C. records and statistics =

Chelsea Football Club are an English professional association football club based in Fulham, London. The club was established in 1905 and plays its home games at Stamford Bridge.

Domestically, Chelsea have won six top-flight titles, eight FA Cups and five League Cups. In international competitions, they have won two UEFA Champions League titles, two UEFA Europa Leagues, two UEFA Cup Winners' Cups, two UEFA Super Cups, one UEFA Conference League and two FIFA Club World Cups. They are the only club to have won four main UEFA club competitions, and the only London club to have won the UEFA Champions League and FIFA Club World Cup. The club's record appearance maker is Ron Harris, who made 795 appearances between 1961 and 1980. Frank Lampard is Chelsea's record goalscorer, scoring 211 goals in total.

== Honours ==
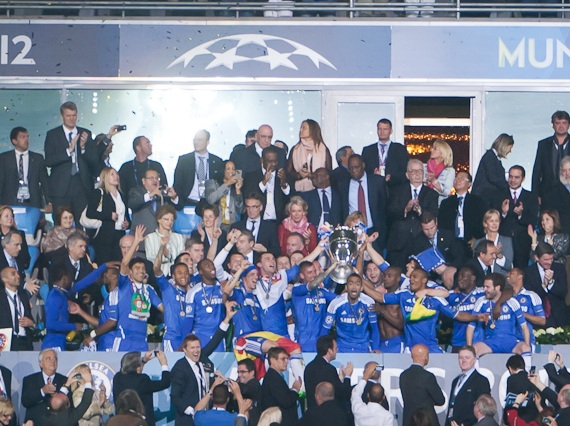
In 2012, Chelsea became the first London club to win the UEFA Champions League.

The first major trophy won by Chelsea came in 1955, when the team became national champions after winning the 1954–55 First Division title. In the 2009–10 season, Chelsea won their first and only double after winning both the Premier League and the FA Cup. Upon winning the 2024–25 UEFA Conference League, Chelsea became the first club in history to have won all five major UEFA club competitions (UEFA Champions League, UEFA Cup Winners' Cup, UEFA Europa League, UEFA Conference League, and UEFA Super Cup). Their most recent success came in July 2025, when they won their second FIFA Club World Cup title.

Chelsea F.C. honours
Honour	No.	Years
Football League First Division / Premier League	6	1954–55, 2004–05, 2005–06, 2009–10, 2014–15, 2016–17
Football League Second Division	2	1983–84, 1988–89
FA Cup	8	1970, 1997, 2000, 2007, 2009, 2010, 2012, 2018
League Cup	5	1965, 1998, 2005, 2007, 2015
FA Charity Shield / FA Community Shield	4	1955, 2000, 2005, 2009
Full Members' Cup	2	1986, 1990
UEFA Champions League	2	2012, 2021
UEFA Europa League	2	2013, 2019
UEFA Conference League	1	2025
European Cup Winners' Cup / UEFA Cup Winners' Cup	2	1971, 1998
UEFA Super Cup	2	1998, 2021
FIFA Club World Cup	2	2021, 2025

== Players ==
=== Appearances ===
- Most appearances in all competitions: 795, Ron Harris (1961–1980)
- Most league appearances: 655, Ron Harris (1961–1980)
- Most FA Cup appearances: 64, Ron Harris (1961–1980)
- Most League Cup appearances: 48, John Hollins (1963–1975 and 1983–1984) and Ron Harris (1961–1980)
- Most appearances in UEFA competitions: 124, John Terry (1998–2015)
- Most consecutive appearances: 167, John Hollins, 14 August 1971 – 25 September 1974
- Most consecutive league appearances: 164, Frank Lampard, 13 October 2001 – 26 December 2005
- Most appearances in a single season: 64, Juan Mata, Oscar and Fernando Torres, 2012–13
- Most international caps while a Chelsea player: Frank Lampard, 104 for England
- First Chelsea player to play for England: George Hilsdon, 16 February 1907
- First Chelsea player to play for England at a World Cup: Roy Bentley, 1950 World Cup, 25 June 1950
- First foreign (non-UK) player: Nils Middelboe (Denmark), 15 November 1913
- Youngest player: Ian Hamilton, 16 years and 138 days, v. Tottenham Hotspur, First Division, 18 March 1967
- Oldest player: Mark Schwarzer, 41 years and 218 days, v. Cardiff City, Premier League, 11 May 2014
- First substitute: John Boyle, who replaced George Graham v. Fulham, First Division, 28 August 1965
- Most different players used in a season: 39 (during the 2024–25 season)

==== Most appearances ====
Competitive matches only.

Rank	Player	Years	League	FA Cup	League Cup	Europe	Other^{1}	Total
1	(England) Ron Harris	1961–1980	655	64	48	27	1	795
2	(England) Peter Bonetti	1959–1975; 1975–1979	600	57	45	26	1	729
3	(England) John Terry	1998–2017	492	58	37	124	6	717
4	(England) Frank Lampard	2001–2014	429	58	34	117	10	648
5	(England) John Hollins	1963–1975; 1983–1984	465	51	48	27	1	592
6	(Spain) César Azpilicueta	2012–2023	349	39	31	80	9	508
7	(Czech Republic) Petr Čech	2004–2015	333	33	17	103	8	494
8	(England) Dennis Wise	1990–2001	332	38	30	38	7	445
9	(Scotland) Steve Clarke	1987–1998	330	36	26	12	17	421
10	(England) Kerry Dixon	1983–1992	335	20	41	0	24	420

^{1} ^{The "Other" column includes appearances in Charity/Community Shield, Football League play-offs, Full Members' Cup, UEFA Super Cup, and FIFA Club World Cup.}

=== Goalscorers ===
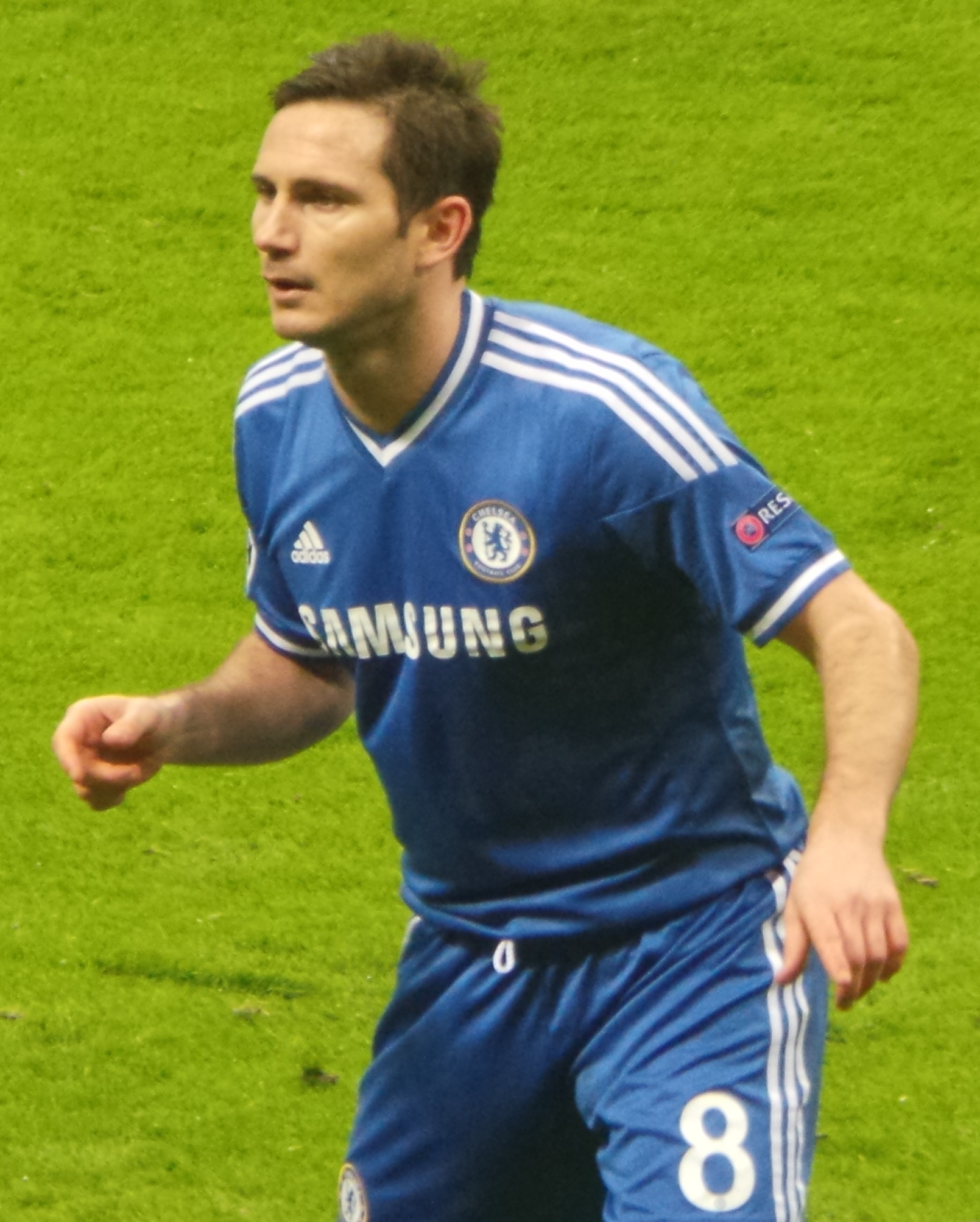
Frank Lampard is Chelsea's all-time top goalscorer

- Most goals in all competitions: 211, Frank Lampard (2001–2014)
- Most goals in a season: 43, Jimmy Greaves (First Division, 1960–61)
- Most goals in one match: 6, George Hilsdon v. Worksop Town, FA Cup, first round, 11 January 1908
- Most goals in one final: 3, David Speedie v. Manchester City, Full Members' Cup final, 23 March 1986
- Most league goals: 164, Bobby Tambling (1959–1970)
- Most league goals in a season: 41, Jimmy Greaves, (First Division, 1960–61)
- Most times top goalscorer: 8, Roy Bentley
- Most league goals in one match: 5, achieved by four players on six occasions:
  - George Hilsdon v. Glossop, Second Division, 1 September 1906
  - Jimmy Greaves v. Wolverhampton Wanderers, First Division, 30 August 1958
  - Jimmy Greaves v. Preston North End, First Division, 19 December 1959
  - Jimmy Greaves v. West Bromwich Albion, First Division, 3 December 1960
  - Bobby Tambling v. Aston Villa, First Division, 17 September 1966
  - Gordon Durie v. Walsall, Second Division, 4 February 1989
- Most Premier League/First Division goals: 147, Frank Lampard (2001–2014)
- Most Premier League goals in a season: 29, Didier Drogba (2009–10)
- Most Premier League goals in one match: 4, achieved by four players on six occasions:
  - Gianluca Vialli v. Barnsley, 24 August 1997
  - Jimmy Floyd Hasselbaink v. Coventry City, 21 October 2000
  - Frank Lampard v. Derby County, 12 March 2008
  - Frank Lampard v. Aston Villa, 27 March 2010
  - Cole Palmer v. Everton, 15 April 2024
  - Cole Palmer v. Brighton & Hove Albion, 28 September 2024
- Most FA Cup goals: 26, Frank Lampard (2001–2014)
- Most FA Cup goals in a season: 8, Peter Osgood, (1969–70)
- Most FA Cup goals in one match: 6, George Hilsdon v. Worksop Town, first round, 11 January 1908
- Most FA Cup Final goals: 4, Didier Drogba (2004–2012, 2014–15)
- Most League Cup goals: 25, Kerry Dixon (1983–1992)
- Most League Cup goals in a season: 8, Kerry Dixon, (1984–85)
- Most League Cup goals in one match: 4, Kerry Dixon v. Gillingham, first round (second leg), 13 September 1983
- Most League Cup Final goals: 4, Didier Drogba (2004–2012, 2014–15)
- Most Cup Final goals: 9, Didier Drogba (2004–2012, 2014–15)
- Most European goals: 36, Didier Drogba (2004–2012, 2014–15)
- Most European goals in a season: 11, Olivier Giroud (2018–19 UEFA Europa League)
- Most European goals in one match: 5, Peter Osgood v. Jeunesse Hautcharage, UEFA Cup Winners' Cup, first round (second leg), 29 September 1971
- Most hat-tricks: 13, Jimmy Greaves, (1957–1961)
- Most Premier League hat-tricks: 4, Cole Palmer (2023–present)
- Most international goals while a Chelsea player: Didier Drogba, 45 for Ivory Coast
- Oldest goalscorer: Thiago Silva, 39 years and 198 days, v. Sheffield United, Premier League, 7 April 2024
- Youngest goalscorer: Ian Hamilton, 16 years and 138 days, v. Tottenham Hotspur, First Division, 18 March 1967
- Fastest goal: 12 seconds, Keith Weller v. Middlesbrough, League Cup, 7 October 1970
- Most different goalscorers in a season: 21 (during the 2021–22 season)
- Quickest Premier League hat-trick: 9 minutes and 48 seconds, Cole Palmer v. Brighton & Hove Albion, 28 September 2024

==== Overall scorers ====
Competitive matches only. Appearances in parentheses.

Rank	Player	Years	League	FA Cup	League Cup	Europe	Other^{1}	Total
1	(England) Frank Lampard	2001–2014	147 (429)	26 (58)	12 (34)	25 (117)	1 (10)	211 (648)
2	(England) Bobby Tambling	1959–1970	164 (302)	25 (36)	10 (18)	3 (14)	0 (0)	202 (370)
3	(England) Kerry Dixon	1983–1992	147 (335)	8 (20)	25 (41)	0 (0)	13 (24)	193 (420)
4	(Ivory Coast) Didier Drogba	2004–2012; 2014–2015	104 (254)	12 (29)	10 (20)	36 (74)	2 (4)	164 (381)
5	(England) Roy Bentley	1948–1956	128 (324)	21 (42)	0 (0)	0 (0)	1 (1)	150 (367)
5	(England) Peter Osgood	1964–1974; 1978–1979	105 (289)	19 (34)	10 (30)	16 (26)	0 (1)	150 (380)
7	(England) Jimmy Greaves	1957–1961	124 (157)	3 (7)	2 (2)	3 (3)	0 (0)	132 (169)
8	(England) George Mills	1929–1943	118 (220)	7 (19)	0 (0)	0 (0)	0 (0)	125 (239)
9	(Belgium) Eden Hazard	2012–2019	85 (245)	5 (23)	8 (25)	11 (53)	1 (6)	110 (352)
10	(England) George Hilsdon	1906–1912	99 (150)	9 (14)	0 (0)	0 (0)	0 (0)	108 (164)

^{1} ^{The "Other" column includes goals in Charity/Community Shield, Football League play-offs, Full Members' Cup, UEFA Super Cup, and FIFA Club World Cup.}

=== Award winners ===
==== FIFPRO awards ====
The following players have won FIFPRO awards while playing for Chelsea:

FIFPRO Men's World 11

- (England) John Terry (5) – 2005, 2006, 2007, 2008, 2009
- (Belgium) Eden Hazard (2) – 2018, 2019
- (France) N'Golo Kanté (2) – 2018, 2021
- (France) Claude Makélélé – 2005
- (England) Frank Lampard – 2005
- (Ivory Coast) Didier Drogba – 2007
- (Brazil) David Luiz – 2014
- (Italy) Jorginho – 2021
- (England) Cole Palmer – 2025

==== FIFA awards ====
The following players have won FIFA awards while playing for Chelsea:

FIFA Men's World 11

- (England) Cole Palmer – 2025

The Best FIFA Men's Goalkeeper

- (Belgium) Thibaut Courtois – 2018
- (Senegal) Édouard Mendy – 2021

==== UEFA awards ====
The following players have won UEFA awards while playing for Chelsea:

UEFA Men's Player of the Year

- (Italy) Jorginho – 2021

UEFA Club Goalkeeper of the Year

- (Czech Republic) Petr Čech (3) – 2004–05, 2006–07, 2007–08

UEFA Champions League Goalkeeper of the Season

- (Senegal) Édouard Mendy – 2020–21

UEFA Club Defender of the Year

- (England) John Terry (3) – 2004–05, 2007–08, 2008–09

UEFA Club Midfielder of the Year

- (England) Frank Lampard – 2007–08

UEFA Champions League Midfielder of the Season

- (France) N'Golo Kanté – 2020–21

UEFA Team of the Year

- (England) John Terry (4) – 2005, 2007, 2008, 2009
- (Belgium) Eden Hazard (2) – 2017, 2018
- (Portugal) Ricardo Carvalho – 2004
- (Czech Republic) Petr Čech – 2005
- (Ivory Coast) Didier Drogba – 2007
- (England) Ashley Cole – 2010
- (France) N'Golo Kanté – 2018

==== IFFHS awards ====
The following players have won International Federation of Football History & Statistics awards while playing for Chelsea:

IFFHS World's Best Goalkeeper

- (Czech Republic) Petr Čech – 2005
- (Belgium) Thibaut Courtois – 2018

IFFHS World Team

- (Belgium) Thibaut Courtois – 2018
- (Belgium) Eden Hazard – 2018
- (Italy) Jorginho – 2021

==== PFA awards ====
The following players have won Professional Footballers' Association awards while playing for Chelsea:

PFA Players' Player of the Year

- (England) John Terry – 2004–05
- (Belgium) Eden Hazard – 2014–15
- (France) N'Golo Kanté – 2016–17

PFA Fans' Player of the Year

- (England) Frank Lampard – 2004–05
- (Belgium) Eden Hazard – 2018–19
- (England) Cole Palmer – 2023–24

PFA Young Player of the Year

- (England) Scott Parker – 2003–04
- (Belgium) Eden Hazard – 2013–14
- (England) Cole Palmer – 2023–24

PFA Team of the Year

- (England) John Terry (4) – 2003–04, 2004–05, 2005–06, 2014–15
- (Belgium) Eden Hazard (4) – 2012–13, 2013–14, 2014–15, 2016–17
- (England) Frank Lampard (3) – 2003–04, 2004–05, 2005–06
- (England) Gary Cahill (3) – 2013–14, 2014–15, 2016–17
- (Republic of Ireland) Andy Townsend (2) – 1990–91, 1991–92
- (France) William Gallas (2) – 2002–03, 2005–06
- (Czech Republic) Petr Čech (2) – 2004–05, 2013–14
- (Ivory Coast) Didier Drogba (2) – 2006–07, 2009–10
- (Serbia) Branislav Ivanović (2) – 2009–10, 2014–15
- (England) Kerry Dixon – 1984–85
- (Netherlands) Ruud Gullit – 1995–96
- (England) Graeme Le Saux – 1997–98
- (Netherlands) Arjen Robben – 2004–05
- (England) Joe Cole – 2005–06
- (France) Nicolas Anelka – 2008–09
- (England) Ashley Cole – 2010–11
- (Spain) Juan Mata – 2012–13
- (Spain) Diego Costa – 2014–15
- (Serbia) Nemanja Matić – 2014–15
- (France) N'Golo Kanté – 2016–17
- (Brazil) David Luiz – 2016–17
- (Spain) Marcos Alonso – 2017–18
- (Germany) Antonio Rüdiger – 2021–22

==== FWA awards ====
The following players have won the Football Writers' Association award while playing for Chelsea:

FWA Footballer of the Year

- (Italy) Gianfranco Zola – 1996–97
- (England) Frank Lampard – 2004–05
- (Belgium) Eden Hazard – 2014–15
- (France) N'Golo Kanté – 2016–17

FWA Tribute Award

- (England) Frank Lampard – 2009–10
- (Ivory Coast) Didier Drogba – 2014–15

==== Premier League awards ====
Premier League Player of the Season

- (England) Frank Lampard – 2004–05
- (Belgium) Eden Hazard – 2014–15
- (France) N'Golo Kanté – 2016–17

Premier League Young Player of the Season

- (England) Cole Palmer – 2023–24

Premier League Golden Boot

- (Ivory Coast) Didier Drogba (2) – 2006–07, 2009–10
- (Netherlands) Jimmy Floyd Hasselbaink – 2000–01
- (France) Nicolas Anelka – 2008–09

Premier League Golden Glove

- (Czech Republic) Petr Čech (3) – 2004–05, 2009–10, 2013–14
- (Belgium) Thibaut Courtois – 2016–17

Premier League Playmaker of the Season

- (Belgium) Eden Hazard – 2018–19

Premier League Game Changer of the Season

- (England) Cole Palmer – 2023–24

=== Transfers ===
Where the report mentions an initial fee potentially rising to a higher figure depending on contractual clauses being satisfied in the future, only the initial fee is listed in the tables.

==== Highest transfer fees paid ====
Rank	Player	From	Fee (£ million)	Year
1	(England) Morgan Rogers	(England) Aston Villa	£117	2026
2	(Argentina) Enzo Fernández	(Portugal) Benfica	£106.8	2023
3	(Ecuador) Moisés Caicedo	(England) Brighton & Hove Albion	£100 (Note: Initial £100 million plus £15 million in possible add-ons)	2023
4	(Belgium) Romelu Lukaku	(Italy) Inter Milan	£97.5	2021
5	(Spain) Kepa Arrizabalaga	(Spain) Athletic Bilbao	£71.6	2018
6	(France) Wesley Fofana	(England) Leicester City	£70	2022
7	(Germany) Kai Havertz	(Germany) Bayer Leverkusen	£62 (Note: Initial £62 million plus £8 million in possible add-ons)	2020
7	(Ukraine) Mykhailo Mudryk	(Ukraine) Shakhtar Donetsk	£62 (Note: Initial £62 million plus £27 million in possible add-ons)	2023
9	(Spain) Álvaro Morata	(Spain) Real Madrid	£58	2017
9	(United States) Christian Pulisic	(Germany) Borussia Dortmund	£58	2019

==== Highest transfer fees received ====
Rank	Player	To	Fee (£ million)	Year
1	(Argentina) Enzo Fernández	(England) Manchester City	£125	2026
2	(Belgium) Eden Hazard	(Spain) Real Madrid	£89 (Note: Initial £89 million plus £60 million in possible add-ons)	2019
3	(Germany) Kai Havertz	(England) Arsenal	£65	2023
4	(Brazil) Oscar	(China) Shanghai SIPG	£60	2017
5	(Spain) Álvaro Morata	(Spain) Atlético Madrid	£58	2019
6	(Spain) Diego Costa	(Spain) Atlético Madrid	£57	2017
7	(England) Mason Mount	(England) Manchester United	£55 (Note: Initial £55 million plus £5 million in possible add-ons)	2023
8	(Brazil) David Luiz	(France) Paris Saint-Germain	£50	2014
9	(England) Noni Madueke	(England) Arsenal	£48.5 (Note: Initial £48.5 million plus £3.5 million in possible add-ons)	2025
10	(Brazil) Andrey Santos	(England) Manchester United	£48 (Note: Initial £48 million plus £2 million in possible add-ons)	2026

== Managerial records ==
- First full-time manager: John Tait Robertson, from August 1905 to November 1906
- First foreign (non-UK) manager: Ruud Gullit (Netherlands), from 10 May 1996 to 12 February 1998
- Longest-serving manager: David Calderhead – 25 years, 280 days (1 August 1907 to 8 May 1933)
- Most successful manager: José Mourinho (won eight trophies in two spells as manager, 2004–2007 and 2013–2015)
- Highest winning percentage (minimum 10 games managed): Guus Hiddink (first spell), 74%
- Lowest winning percentage (minimum 10 games managed): Frank Lampard (second spell), 9%

=== Award winners ===
==== FIFA Awards ====
The following manager has won FIFA awards while managing Chelsea:

The Best FIFA Football Coach

- (Germany) Thomas Tuchel – 2021

==== UEFA awards ====
The following managers have won UEFA awards while managing Chelsea:

UEFA Manager of the Year

- (Germany) Thomas Tuchel – 2020–21

UEFA Team of the Year

- (Portugal) José Mourinho – 2004, 2005

==== International Federation of Football History & Statistics (IFFHS) awards ====
The following managers have won IFFHS awards while managing Chelsea:

IFFHS World's Best Club Coach

- (Portugal) José Mourinho – 2005
- (Germany) Thomas Tuchel – 2021

==== League Managers Association (LMA) awards ====
The following managers have won LMA awards while managing Chelsea:

LMA Manager of the Year

- (Italy) Antonio Conte – 2017

LMA Special Merit Award

- (Italy) Roberto Di Matteo – 2013

==== Premier League awards ====
The following managers have won Premier League awards while managing Chelsea:

Premier League Manager of the Season

- (Portugal) José Mourinho – 2004–05, 2005–06, 2014–15
- (Italy) Antonio Conte – 2016–17

== Club records ==
=== Attendances ===
- Highest home attendance (estimate): 100,000, against Dynamo Moscow, 13 November 1945
- Highest home attendance (official): 82,905, against Arsenal, First Division, 12 October 1935
- Highest home attendance (Second Division): 67,000, against Manchester United, 13 April 1906
- Highest home attendance (FA Cup): 77,952, against Swindon Town, 13 March 1911
- Highest home attendance (League Cup): 43,330, against Tottenham Hotspur, 22 December 1971
- Highest home attendance (Europe): 59,541, against Milan, 16 February 1966
- Highest season home aggregate: 1,014,352 (1954–55 season)
- Highest league home average: 48,302 (1954–55 season)
- Highest attendance for any match: 105,826, against Real Madrid, Michigan Stadium, United States, 30 July 2016
- Highest away attendance: 98,436, against Barcelona, UEFA Champions League Round of 16 second leg, 7 March 2006
- Lowest home attendance: 2,000, against Leeds United, Premier League, 5 December 2020
- Highest average attendance in English football: 1907–08, 1909–10, 1911–12, 1912–13, 1913–14, 1919–20, 1921–22, 1923–24, 1925–26, 1954–55

=== Firsts ===
- First match: Chelsea v. Stockport County, Second Division, 2 September 1905
- First win: Chelsea v. Liverpool, friendly match, 4 September 1905
- First competitive goalscorer: John Robertson, v. Blackpool, Second Division, 9 September 1905
- First FA Cup match: Chelsea v. First Grenadier Guards, first qualifying round, 7 October 1905
- First FA Cup match (proper): Chelsea v. Lincoln City, first round, 12 January 1907
- First League Cup match: Chelsea v. Millwall, first round, 10 October 1960
- First European match: Chelsea v. BK Frem, Inter-Cities Fairs Cup, 30 September 1958
- First Cup Winners' Cup match: Chelsea v. Aris, first round, 16 September 1970
- First UEFA Champions League match: Chelsea v. Skonto Riga, third qualifying round, 11 August 1999
- First UEFA Champions League match (proper): Chelsea v. Milan, first group stage, 15 September 1999
- First FA Cup winners at the new Wembley Stadium: Chelsea v. Manchester United, 2007 FA Cup final, 19 May 2007
- First domestic double: Chelsea v. Portsmouth, 2010 FA Cup final, 15 May 2010 (also winning the 2009–10 Premier League)
- The first team to score 100 Premier League goals in a season: 2009–10 Premier League season
- The first English team to qualify for the UEFA European Cup, winning the 1954–55 First Division (Chelsea were not allowed to participate by the Football Association)
- The first London based team to win the UEFA Champions League: 2011–12 season
- The first UEFA Champions League title holders to get knocked out in the group stage the following year: 2012–13 season
- The first English team to win all three major UEFA competitions
- The first UEFA Champions League title holders to win the UEFA Cup/UEFA Europa League the following year: 2012–13 season
- The first team in history of the European competitions to be holders of the UEFA Champions League and the UEFA Europa League at the same time (winning the 2013 UEFA Europa League final on 15 May 2013, and still being holders of the 2011–12 UEFA Champions League until 25 May 2013)
- The first team to go 18 successive UEFA Europa League matches without defeat since the competition was rebranded in 2009–10
- The first team in Premier League history to have two different hat-trick scorers in a single campaign aged 21 or under
- The first top-flight team in history to win 30 games in a 38-game season: 2016–17 Premier League season
- The first team to win 15 away matches in a Premier League season: 2004–05 season
- The first team to win 18 home matches in a Premier League season: 2004–05 season
- The first team to win against every other team at least once in a Premier League season: 2005–06 season
- The first London based team to win the FIFA Club World Cup: 2021
- The first team to lose seven consecutive major English domestic cup finals (from 2019 EFL Cup final to 2026 FA Cup final)

=== Results ===
==== Wins ====
- Record win: 13–0 v. Jeunesse Hautcharage, 1971–72 European Cup Winners' Cup, 29 September 1971
- Record league win: 8–0 v. Wigan Athletic, Premier League, 9 May 2010 and 8–0 v. Aston Villa, Premier League, 23 December 2012
- Record FA Cup win: 9–1 v. Worksop Town, first round, 11 January 1908
- Record League Cup win: 7–0 v. Doncaster Rovers, third round, 16 November 1960
- Record European win: 13–0 v. Jeunesse Hautcharage, 1971–72 European Cup Winners' Cup, 29 September 1971
- Record European win (away): 0–8 v. Jeunesse Hautcharage, 1971–72 European Cup Winners' Cup, 15 September 1971
- Record Champions League win (home): 6–0 v. Maribor on 21 October 2014 and v. Qarabağ on 12 September 2017
- Record Champions League win (away): 0–5 v. Galatasaray on 20 October 1999 and v. Schalke 04 on 25 November 2014
- Most consecutive league wins: 13, 1 October 2016 – 31 December 2016
- Longest sequence without a league win: 21, 3 November 1987 – 2 April 1988
- Most league wins in a season: 30 in 38 matches, Premier League, 2016–17
- Fewest league wins in a season: 5 in 42 matches, First Division, 1978–79
- Most consecutive league wins against the same opponent: 13, v. Crystal Palace, 10 March 2018 – 12 February 2024

==== Draws ====
- Highest scoring draw: 5–5
  - Bolton Wanderers v. Chelsea, 30 October 1937, First Division
  - Chelsea v. West Ham United, 17 December 1966, First Division
- Most league draws in a season: 18 in 42 matches, First Division, 1922–23
- Longest sequence of league draws: 6, 20 August 1969 – 13 September 1969

==== Unbeaten ====
- Longest sequence of unbeaten matches:
  - 23, 23 January 2007 – 13 April 2007
  - 23, 4 April 2009 – 23 September 2009
  - 23, 4 May 2014 – 6 December 2014
- Longest sequence of unbeaten league matches: 40, 23 October 2004 – 29 October 2005
- Longest sequence of unbeaten home matches in Premier League: 86, 20 March 2004 – 26 October 2008

==== Losses ====
- Record defeat: 1–8 v. Wolverhampton Wanderers, First Division, 26 September 1953
- Record Premier League defeat: 0–6 v. Manchester City, 10 February 2019
- Record FA Cup defeat:
  - 1–7 v. Crystal Palace, third qualifying round, 18 November 1905
  - 0–6 v. Sheffield Wednesday, second round replay, 5 February 1913
- Record League Cup defeat: 2–6 v. Stoke City, third round replay, 22 October 1974
- Record European defeat: 0–5 v. Barcelona, Inter-Cities Fairs Cup, semi-final replay, 25 May 1966
- Record Champions League defeat: 1–5 (after extra time) v. Barcelona, quarter-final second leg, 18 April 2000
- Longest sequence of league defeats: 7, 1 November 1952 – 20 December 1952
- Most league defeats in a season: 27 in 42 matches, First Division, 1978–79
- Fewest league defeats in a season: 1 in 38 matches, Premier League, 2004–05

=== Goals ===
- Most goals scored in one match: 13 v. Jeunesse Hautcharage, 1971–72 UEFA Cup Winners' Cup, 29 September 1971
- Most goals conceded in one match: 8 v. Wolverhampton Wanderers, First Division, 26 September 1953
- Most league goals scored in one season: 103 in 38 matches, Premier League, 2009–10
- Fewest league goals scored in one season: 31 in 42 matches, First Division, 1923–24
- Most league goals conceded in one season: 100 in 42 matches, First Division, 1960–61
- Fewest league goals conceded in one season: 15 in 38 matches, Premier League, 2004–05
- Fewest league goals conceded at home in one season: 6 in 19 matches, Premier League, 2004–05
- Fewest league goals conceded away in one season: 9 in 19 matches, Premier League, 2004–05
- Most goal scorers in a single game (league): 7 v. Aston Villa, Premier League, 23 December 2012

=== Points ===
- Most points earned in a season (3 for a win): 99 in 46 matches, Second Division, 1988–89
- Fewest points earned in a season (3 for a win): 42 in 40 matches, First Division, 1987–88
- Most points earned in a season (2 for a win): 57 in 38 matches, Second Division, 1906–07
- Fewest points earned in a season (2 for a win): 20 in 42 matches, First Division, 1978–79

=== Clean sheets ===
- Most clean sheets in one season: 34 in 59 matches, 2004–05
- Fewest clean sheets in one season: 2 in 47 matches, 1960–61
- Most league clean sheets in one season: 25 in 38 matches, Premier League, 2004–05
- Fewest league clean sheets in one season: 1 in 42 matches, First Division, 1960–61
- Longest run without a clean sheet: 31 games, November 1960 – August 1961
- Most consecutive league clean sheets during a season: 10, 18 December 2004 – 12 February 2005
- Most clean sheets by an individual goalkeeper: 228, Petr Čech (2004–2015)
- Most clean sheets by an individual goalkeeper in one season: 28, Petr Čech, 2004–05
- Most Premier League clean sheets by an individual goalkeeper in one season: 24, Petr Čech, 2004–05
- Most consecutive clean sheets by an individual goalkeeper: 9, William Foulke, 1905–06
- Most overall clean sheets in Premier League: 162, Petr Čech (2004–2015)

=== Penalties ===
- Most penalties saved in penalty shoot-outs: 7, Kepa Arrizabalaga
- Most penalties scored by a single player: 49, Frank Lampard

== National / European records ==
- Fewest goals conceded in a league season: 15 in 38 matches, Premier League, 2004–05 (English top flight record)
- Fewest goals conceded away in a league season: 9 in 18 matches, Premier League, 2004–05 (English top flight record)
- Most consecutive clean sheets at the start of a season: 6, 14 August 2005 – 17 September 2005 (English top flight record)
- Longest sequence of unbeaten home league matches: 86, 21 February 2004 – 26 October 2008 (English record)
- Most clean sheets in a season: 25, 2004–05 (Premier League record)
- Most goals scored at home in a league season: 68, 2009–10 (Premier League record)
- Most consecutive league away wins: 11, 5 April 2008 – 22 December 2008 (Premier League joint record)
- Most home wins in a league season: 18, 2005–06 (Premier League joint record)
- Fewest home draws in a league season: 0, 2016–17 (Premier League joint record)
- Most consecutive wins from start of a season: 9, 2005–06 (Premier League record)
- Most days spent in first place in a season: 274 days, 2014–15 (Premier League record)
- Highest aggregate scoreline in European competition: 21–0, v Jeunesse Hautcharage, 1971–72 European Cup Winners' Cup, 29 September 1971 (joint record)
- Fewest goals conceded in a Champions League group stage campaign: 1, 2005–06 (joint record)
- Most Champions League games played in the knockout phase by an English club (since the competition rebranded in 1992): 79 matches
- Most Champions League round of 16 appearances by an English club (since the competition rebranded in 1992): 18 appearances
- Most Champions League round of 16 aggregate wins by an English club (since the competition rebranded in 1992): 11 wins
- Most Champions League quarter-final aggregate wins by an English club (since the competition rebranded in 1992): 8 wins
- Most Champions League semi-finals appearances by an English club (since the competition rebranded in 1992): 8 appearances
- Most consecutive Europa League matches without defeat: 18 matches
- The only team to score at least 4 goals in a Europa League final (since the competition rebranded in 2009)
- Largest winning margin in a UEFA Conference League match: 8–0 v Noah, 7 November 2024
- Longest unbeaten run in the FA Cup: 29 matches (excluding penalty shoot-outs)
- The first team to compete in one of the major English domestic cup finals (League Cup/FA Cup) in six consecutive seasons: 2016–17 to 2021–22
- The only team to have won all four UEFA main club competitions; the UEFA Champions League, the UEFA Cup Winners' Cup, the UEFA Europa League, and the UEFA Conference League.

== See also ==
- Chelsea F.C. in international football
- List of Chelsea F.C. managers
