= Graeme Le Saux =

Jersey footballer (born 1968)

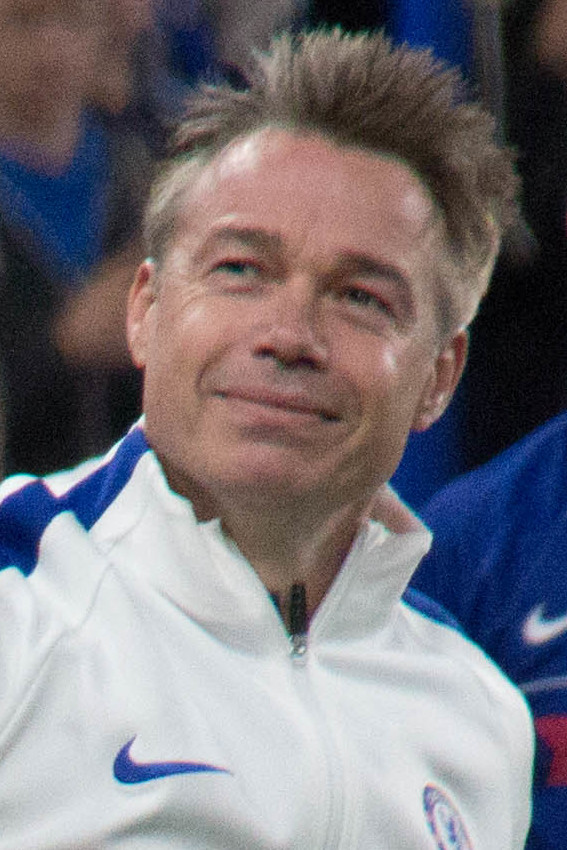
- Le Saux in 2018

Personal information
- Full name: Graeme Pierre Le Saux
- Date of birth: 17 October 1968 (age 58)
- Place of birth: St Helier, Jersey
- Height: 5 ft 10 in (1.78 m)
- Position: Left back

Youth career
- –1987: St. Paul's
- 1987–1989: Chelsea

Senior career*
Years	Team	Apps	(Gls)
1989–1993	Chelsea	90	(8)
1993–1997	Blackburn Rovers	129	(7)
1997–2003	Chelsea	140	(4)
2003–2005	Southampton	44	(1)
2012	Wembley	0	(0)
Total		403	(20)

International career
1990	England U21	4	(0)
1991–1992	England B	2	(0)
1994–2000	England	36	(1)
- * Club domestic league appearances and goals

Graeme Pierre Le Saux (/lə ˈsoʊ/ lə SOH; born 17 October 1968) is a television pundit and former professional footballer who played mostly as a left back. During his senior career, he played for Chelsea, Blackburn Rovers, and Southampton, and for the England national football team.

Le Saux started his career in his native Jersey before moving to England when he signed for Chelsea in 1987. He made his debut in 1989 and played initially as a left winger before transitioning to an attacking fullback role for the club. He left Chelsea in 1993 to join the newly promoted Blackburn side being built by wealthy benefactor Jack Walker and was a regular fixture in their 1994–95 Premier League winning side. In 1997, he became the most expensive defender in English footballing history when he returned to Chelsea for £5 million, staying there for six seasons before finishing his career with a move to Southampton in 2003. He announced his retirement from football upon Southampton's relegation from the Premier League in 2005.

In his club playing career, he scored 20 goals from 403 club appearances. He was twice named in the Professional Footballers' Association Team of the Year, in 1995 with Blackburn and in 1998 with Chelsea. As an England international, he made 36 senior appearances from 1994 until 2000, including starting all four England games at the 1998 FIFA World Cup in France, and scoring one international goal, against Brazil.

== Club career ==
=== Chelsea ===
Le Saux started his career at St. Paul's of Jersey before moving to Chelsea in December 1987 after being spotted playing in a local tournament by manager John Hollins. He made his debut for the club two years later against Portsmouth and had become a regular by the 1990–91 season. His first stint at Chelsea ended in controversy, though. Angry at continually being substituted, he snapped when he was subbed again during a match with Southampton and threw his shirt to the ground as he stormed past manager Ian Porterfield. He was sold to Blackburn Rovers in March 1993 for £700,000.

=== Blackburn Rovers ===
Le Saux arrived at Blackburn as part of wealthy benefactor Jack Walker and manager Kenny Dalglish's plan to establish the club as one of the country's top sides, and joined an impressive side containing the likes of Alan Shearer and Colin Hendry. Blackburn finished second in Le Saux's first full season, and were crowned Premier League champions a year later, with Le Saux a near ever-present. He missed the second half of the following season due to a broken ankle which also ruled him out of Euro 96, but was still caught up in controversy after fighting with teammate David Batty during a UEFA Champions League tie with Spartak Moscow.

=== Return to Chelsea ===
In August 1997, Le Saux became the most expensive defender in English football when he returned to Chelsea in a £5 million deal. Always a regular when available, Le Saux's second spell with Chelsea was often interrupted by injury or suspension. He remained there for six seasons, and was an important part of the side which won the League Cup and Cup Winners' Cup in 1998 and the FA Cup in 2000, though he missed the latter two of those finals through injury.

=== Southampton ===
He was swapped in a part-exchange deal with Southampton for Wayne Bridge in 2003. Le Saux played for another two seasons before announcing his retirement in May 2005 following Southampton's relegation from the Premiership. He scored two goals for Southampton, scoring once in the league against Norwich City and once in the League Cup against Bristol City.

=== Wembley ===
In June 2012, he was one of several former professional footballers who agreed to join Wembley to play in their FA Cup campaign for the new season. Le Saux and fellow former-internationals Ray Parlour, Martin Keown, Claudio Caniggia and Brian McBride, plus David Seaman (goalkeeping coach) and former England manager Terry Venables (technical advisor), came out of retirement to play for Wembley who were featured in a television documentary as they attempted to help the club play at Wembley Stadium. Wembley were knocked out in a replay by Uxbridge after initially setting up the tie by knocking Langford out in the previous round.

== International career ==
Le Saux was capped 36 times for England. He made his first appearance in a friendly win over Denmark and played at the 1998 World Cup, appearing in every game as England reached the second round. He missed both Euro 96 and Euro 2000 after picking up injuries in the lead up to both tournaments. Le Saux's only international goal came against Brazil on 11 June 1995 in the Umbro Cup, with a powerful shot from outside the penalty area. It came 18th in a poll of the greatest ever England goals and was one of Le Saux's favourite moments in his career.

== Playing style ==
Rudd Gullit, his manager at Chelsea during the 1997-98 season, wrote that Le Saux was a "left back who loved to send long passes to the left winger or to the striker", and praised him for his quality and adaptability.

== Personal life ==
Le Saux is of English descent through his mother, and has distant Breton descent on his father's side.

=== Homophobic abuse ===
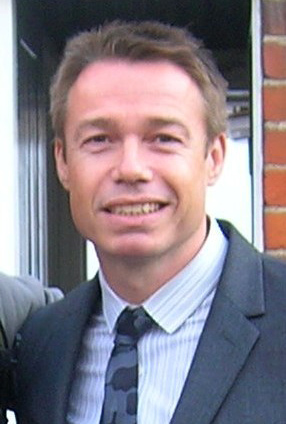
Le Saux in 2011

Le Saux is heterosexual, and he and his wife, Mariana, have two children. Despite this, rumours that he was homosexual circulated throughout his career after he said that he had spent a summer holiday with one of his Chelsea teammates, Ken Monkou. He attributed this to his lack of enthusiasm for the "typical" footballer's lifestyle, his university background, and the fact that he read a left-wing broadsheet newspaper, The Guardian.

This led to abuse from opposition fans and even players. He was involved in a running series of taunts with Liverpool striker Robbie Fowler while playing for Chelsea against Liverpool on 27 February 1999. During the game, Fowler repeatedly bent over and pointed his backside in Le Saux's direction. Le Saux delayed taking a free-kick to protest about Fowler's behaviour and was booked for time wasting. Fowler claimed in an autobiography that at one point during the match, Le Saux shouted "But I'm married!", which was followed up by Fowler's quip "So was Elton John, mate!" Le Saux himself said that this never happened, and that Fowler had used 'dramatic licence' to make himself look funny. The referee did not take any action against Fowler. Unseen by the match officials, Le Saux later struck Fowler on the edge of the Chelsea penalty area. Both were later charged with misconduct by the FA. In a later interview with The Times, Le Saux said, "More than anything in my career, that offended me. What [Fowler] did was wrong and he has never admitted that. He still talks as if it was a bit of a laugh".

Following Thomas Hitzlsperger's disclosure that he was gay in January 2014, Le Saux's article from 2007 resurfaced on social media, causing Fowler to state on Twitter that he had apologised to Le Saux.

In his 2007 autobiography, Le Saux also accused Chelsea's assistant manager Gwyn Williams of making homophobic comments towards him. "He would wander up to me before training and say: 'Come on, poof, get your boots on.'"

=== Education ===
Le Saux took an Environmental Studies degree at Kingston University before dropping out to concentrate on his football career. His interest in learning never left him, however, and as a player he was often derided for reading The Guardian and visiting museums in his spare time.

=== After football ===
Following his retirement he worked as a pundit for the BBC on both their Match of the Day 2 television highlights show, and for their BBC Radio 5 Live station. He works as a match analyst and commentator for the U.S.-based NBC Sports Network's television coverage of the Premier League.

In other television appearances, in 2007 Le Saux was a finalist on the game show Vernon Kay's Gameshow Marathon and in 2009 he competed in series 4 of the talent show Dancing on Ice, being voted off in the first round. Le Saux has reported and presented occasionally for BBC Two's business news programme Working Lunch, while in 2006, he joined ABN AMRO Bank's UK private banking team in the role of Ambassador for their Sports Desk. Le Saux is a trustee of the UK charity Fields in Trust

Le Saux published his autobiography Left Field: A Footballer Apart in September 2007.

He is a non-executive director of RCD Mallorca after the club were bought by American investor Robert Sarver and former NBA player Steve Nash in January 2016.

== Career statistics ==
=== Club ===
Appearances and goals by club, season and competition
Club	Season	League			FA Cup		League Cup		Europe		Other		Total	
Club	Season	Division	Apps	Goals	Apps	Goals	Apps	Goals	Apps	Goals	Apps	Goals	Apps	Goals
Chelsea	1988–89	Second Division	1	0	0	0	—		—		0	0	1	0
Chelsea	1989–90	First Division	7	1	3	0	0	0	—		2 (Note: Appearances in Full Members' Cup)	0	12	1
Chelsea	1990–91	First Division	28	4	1	0	7	1	—		2	0	38	5
Chelsea	1991–92	First Division	40	3	3	0	2	0	—		5	0	50	3
Chelsea	1992–93	Premier League	14	0	1	0	4	0	—		—		19	0
Chelsea	Total		90	8	8	0	13	1	—		9	0	120	9
Blackburn Rovers	1992–93	Premier League	9	0	—		—		—		—		9	0
Blackburn Rovers	1993–94	Premier League	41	2	4	0	4	0	—		—		49	2
Blackburn Rovers	1994–95	Premier League	39	3	2	0	4	0	2 (Note: Appearances in UEFA Cup)	0	1 (Note: Appearance in Charity Shield)	0	48	3
Blackburn Rovers	1995–96	Premier League	14	1	0	0	2	0	3 (Note: Appearances in UEFA Champions League)	0	1	0	20	1
Blackburn Rovers	1996–97	Premier League	26	1	2	0	0	0	—		—		28	1
Blackburn Rovers	Total		129	7	8	0	10	0	5	0	2	0	154	7
Chelsea	1997–98	Premier League	26	1	1	1	4	1	3 (Note: Appearances in UEFA Cup Winners' Cup)	0	—		34	3
Chelsea	1998–99	Premier League	31	0	6	0	0	0	8	0	1 (Note: Appearances in UEFA Super Cup)	0	46	0
Chelsea	1999–2000	Premier League	8	0	0	0	1	0	4	0	—		13	0
Chelsea	2000–01	Premier League	20	0	2	0	0	0	2	0	1	0	25	0
Chelsea	2001–02	Premier League	27	1	8	1	3	0	2	0	—		40	2
Chelsea	2002–03	Premier League	28	2	3	0	2	0	1	0	—		34	2
Chelsea	Total		140	4	20	2	10	1	20	0	2	0	192	7
Southampton	2003–04	Premier League	19	0	0	0	1	1	1	0	—		21	1
Southampton	2004–05	Premier League	25	1	1	0	0	0	—		—		26	1
Southampton	Total		44	1	1	0	1	1	1	0	—		47	2
Career total			403	20	37	2	34	3	26	0	13	0	513	25

=== International ===
Appearances and goals by national team and year
National team	Year	Apps	Goals
England	1994	6	0
England	1995	6	1
England	1997	9	0
England	1998	11	0
England	1999	3	0
England	2000	1	0
Total		36	1

Scores and results list England's goal tally first, score column indicates score after each Le Saux goal.

List of international goals scored by Graeme Le Saux
No.	Date	Venue	Cap	Opponent	Score	Result	Competition
1	11 June 1995	Wembley Stadium, London, England	10	Brazil	1–0	1–3	Umbro Cup

== Honours ==
Chelsea

- Football League Second Division: 1988–89
- FA Cup: 1999–2000
- Football League Cup: 1997–98
- FA Charity Shield: 2000
- UEFA Cup Winners' Cup: 1997–98
- UEFA Super Cup: 1998

Blackburn Rovers

- Premier League: 1994–95

Jersey

- Muratti Vase: 1987

England

- Tournoi de France: 1997

Individual

- PFA Team of the Year: 1994–95 Premier League, 1997–98 Premier League

== See also ==
- List of England international footballers born outside England
