= Johnson David Yeboah =

Ghanaian footballer (born 1995)

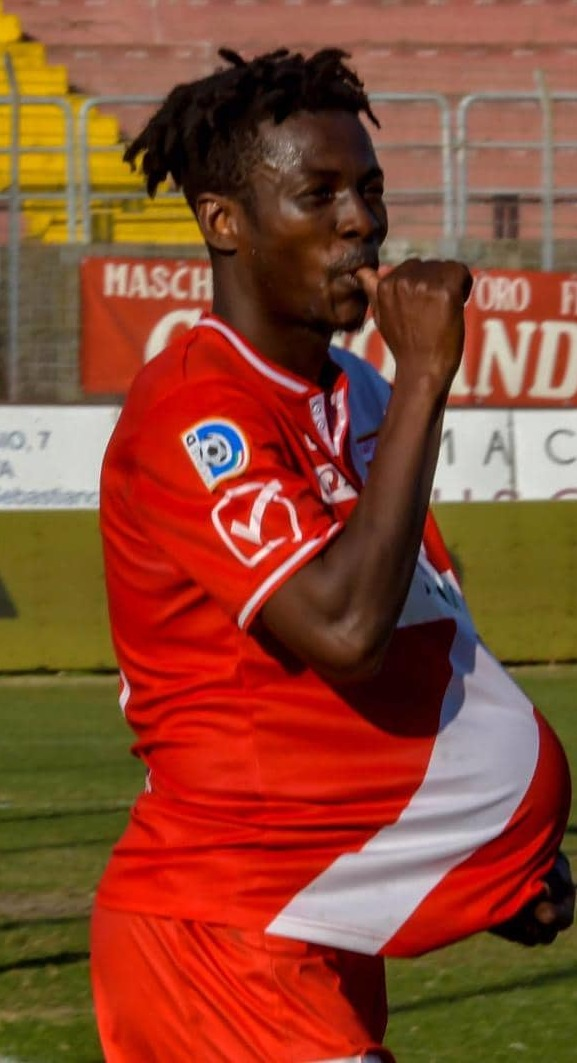

Personal information
- Date of birth: 4 June 1995 (age 31)
- Place of birth: Accra, Ghana
- Height: 1.81 m (5 ft 11 in)
- Position: Forward

Team information
- Current team: Polisportiva Santa Maria 1936

Senior career*
Years	Team	Apps	(Gls)
2013–2014	Savoia	15	(4)
2014–2015	Catanzaro	20	(6)
2015	Turris	18	(7)
2016	Taranto	17	(7)
2016	Gelbison	15	(7)
2017	Ercolanese	17	(8)
2017	Roccella	15	(7)
2017–2018	Messina	9	(5)
2018–2019	Mantova	25	(5)
2019	Chieri	10	(2)
2019	Fidelis Andria	3	(0)
2020	Aprilia	2	(1)
2020–2021	Hamrun Spartans		
2021–	Agropoli	4	(1)

International career
2012	Ghana U17	1	(0)
- * Club domestic league appearances and goals as of 12 January 2020

Johnson David Nana Yeboah (born 4 June 1995) is a Ghanaian professional footballer who plays as a forward for Italian Serie D club Polisportiva Santa Maria 1936 Castellabate.

He previously played for Roccella, Ercolanese, Gelbison Cilento, Taranto, Turris, US Catanzaro and Savoia.

== Biography ==
Born in Accra, Ghana, at 17 years old he was selected to attend a trial out in Italy at S.S. Juve Stabia through the special invitation of FIFA agent Oliver Arthur. in 2013.

== Club career ==
=== Savoia ===
After the trial period, he first featured in the youth ranks until eventually making an appearance with the senior team of Savoia club. The striker signed his first professional contract at Savoia club on a year-long deal in January 2014.

=== Catanzaro ===
On the 24th of August 2014, Johnson sign in Serie C for the US Catanzaro to end the 2014/2015 league campaign

=== Turris ===
Johnson agreed personal terms at Turris in the second half of 2014–15 season again on 31 August 2015

=== Taranto ===
In January 2015, Johnson signed at fellow Lega Pro side Taranto for half of the 2015/2016-seasons. During his spell there, the attacker played 25 league matches, scoring 9 goals.

=== Gelbison ===
On July 15, 2016, he left Taranto permanently to join newly promoted Serie D side Gelbison Cilento.

=== Ercolano ===
Yeboah moved at the end of 2016–2017 season. He joined ASD Roccella on a free transfer.

=== Roccella ===
In the 2017-18 summer Johnson join ASD Roccella after agreeing to a short deal.

=== Messina ===
On 7 December 2017 Yeboah was signed by Serie D club Messina. He was assigned number 9 shirt.

=== Mantova ===
On 20 July 2018, he signed with Serie D club Mantova.

=== Chieri ===
In July 2019, he signed with the Italian Serie D side Chieri.

=== Fidelis Andria ===
On 11 December 2019, he signed with the Italian Serie D side Fidelis Andria.

=== Aprilia ===
In January 2020, after six months as a free agent he signed with Serie D side Aprilia.

=== Hamrun Spartans ===
After just one month in February 2020 he joined Maltese side Hamrun.
