= Kerry Dixon =

English footballer (born 1961)

Personal information
- Full name: Kerry Michael Dixon
- Date of birth: 24 July 1961 (age 65)
- Place of birth: Luton, England
- Height: 6 ft 0 in (1.84 m)
- Position: Striker

Youth career
- Tottenham Hotspur

Senior career*
Years	Team	Apps	(Gls)
- Chesham United
1979–1980	Dunstable		
1980–1983	Reading	116	(51)
1983–1992	Chelsea	335	(193)
1992–1993	Southampton	9	(2)
1993–1995	Luton Town	75	(19)
1995–1996	Millwall	31	(9)
1996	Watford	11	(0)
1996–1997	Doncaster Rovers	16	(3)
1997	Basildon United		
Total		593	(231)

International career
1985	England U21	1	(1)
1985–1986	England	8	(4)

Managerial career
- 1996–1997: Doncaster Rovers (player-manager)
- 2003–2004: Hitchin Town
- 2005–2006: Dunstable Town (co-manager)
- * Club domestic league appearances and goals

Kerry Michael Dixon (born 24 July 1961) is an English retired professional footballer who played as a striker.

His club career was spent most notably at Chelsea, where he won the Second Division twice. His 193 goals for the club across all competitions made him their third-highest goalscorer of all time.

For three consecutive seasons (1982–83, 1983–84 and 1984–85), he was the top goalscorer in his teams' divisions, 3 (with Reading), 2 and 1 (with Chelsea) respectively.

Dixon scored four goals in eight international appearances for the England national football team, and represented the nation at the 1986 FIFA World Cup.

== Playing career ==
=== Early years ===
Dixon was born in Luton. A tall and athletic striker who had pace, an impressive heading ability and was effective with both feet, he started out as an apprentice with Tottenham Hotspur but was released by the club.

=== Reading ===
After spells with Chesham United and Dunstable, he got his first taste of League football with Reading, who signed him for £20,000 in 1980. He scored 51 league goals in 116 appearances for the then Third Division club, including four in a 7–5 defeat at Doncaster Rovers in September 1982. They finished the season relegated to the Fourth Division.

=== Chelsea ===
Following Reading's relegation, Dixon moved up to the Second Division to sign for Chelsea in August 1983. He was signed by manager John Neal. Chelsea chairman Ken Bates initially hesitated when faced with the £150,000 transfer fee plus an additional £25,000 if Dixon ever played for the England national side, but relented and the deal went ahead. Dixon arrived as part of Neal's radical re-building of the side, who had narrowly avoided relegation to the Third Division three months earlier, and was joined in the same summer by Pat Nevin, Nigel Spackman, Joe McLaughlin and Eddie Niedzwiecki, as Chelsea looked to push for promotion to the First Division, having been in the Second Division since 1979.

Dixon's impact at Chelsea was immediate; he scored two goals on his debut against Derby County and added 32 more through the season as the club romped to promotion as Second Division champions to reach the First Division after a five-year absence. Chelsea clinched promotion with a 5–0 win against Leeds United, in which Dixon scored a hat-trick. He struck up an impressive partnership with fiery Scottish striker David Speedie, despite initial personal problems between the two, and also linked up well with winger Nevin; between them the three players scored almost 200 goals over the next three years, as Chelsea not only won promotion but quickly re-established themselves as a First Division side. His impact on the First Division the following season was equally impressive, scoring with a memorable volley in the opening match against Arsenal at Highbury in a 1–1 draw. Dixon eventually finished up as joint top scorer (alongside Gary Lineker) with 24 league goals while Chelsea finished sixth in the final table. In the same season, he hit a further eight goals in the League Cup as Chelsea reached the semi-finals, where they surprisingly lost to Sunderland. In his first two seasons at Chelsea he scored a total of 70 goals in just 101 games.

Chelsea challenged for the title in the 1985–86 season but Dixon suffered torn stomach muscles during an FA Cup tie against Liverpool in January, which did much to damage their chances. They eventually finished sixth again, though he did score twice in a 2–1 win over Manchester United at Old Trafford. The injury also took away much of Dixon's pace and he was never quite the same player again.

During 1986, Dixon was frequently linked with a transfer to Manchester United, whose manager Ron Atkinson had long been monitoring his form, but Atkinson was sacked in November of that year and new manager Alex Ferguson did not follow up interest in Dixon, who would ultimately remain at Stamford Bridge for nearly six more years.

Chelsea struggled in the following two seasons after a series of clashes between key players and the management saw the successful mid 1980s side gradually broken up. Dixon himself was dropped from the side after losing form and was close to joining Chelsea's London rivals Arsenal, though the deal eventually collapsed after chairman Ken Bates intervened. Chelsea were relegated in 1988, an event which, ironically, rejuvenated his career with the club. He scored 25 league goals as Chelsea returned to the First Division as champions at the first attempt in 1988–89. A year later he scored a further 26, including a final day hat-trick against Millwall, to help Chelsea finish fifth, their highest league position since 1970. He spent two more seasons with the club and continued to score on a regular basis, although Chelsea failed to finish higher than mid table in 1991 or 1992. Dixon's final serious chance of a major trophy with Chelsea came in the 1990–91 season, when they went on a good run in the League Cup but lost to Sheffield Wednesday in the semi-finals. They did win the short-lived Full Members Cup twice (1986 and 1990) during Dixon's spell at the club, although Dixon was injured on the occasion of the first victory in this competition.

With 193 goals in total to his name, Dixon is Chelsea's third highest goal scorer of all time, behind only Bobby Tambling and Frank Lampard. He is also tenth in the club's all-time appearances list. His only honours with the club, however, were the two Second Division championship medals and the Full Members Cup. He also never got to represent the club in European competitions.

=== Southampton ===
After nine years at Stamford Bridge, Dixon left Chelsea in the summer of 1992 and joined Southampton in a £575,000 deal, where he briefly linked up with Speedie again, though not with the same success. During his time at Southampton, he only managed nine league appearances and two goals in the new FA Premier League.

=== Luton Town ===
After less than a year at The Dell, Dixon went on loan to Luton Town in February 1993, moving to Kenilworth Road on a free transfer when the move was made permanent in October that year. The highlight of his time at Luton was reaching the FA Cup semi-finals in 1994, where he faced his old side Chelsea and lost 2–0. He scored 20 goals in 88 appearances for Luton.

=== Millwall and Watford ===
In March 1995, Dixon joined Millwall, also in Division One, for a mere £5,000. After 31 appearances and nine goals, he was sold to Watford for £25,000 in January 1996. Dixon appeared in 11 matches for Watford, who along with Millwall were relegated from Division One that season.

=== Doncaster Rovers ===
The final league club he played for was Doncaster Rovers during the 1996–97 season. This came after he was appointed player-manager of the cash-strapped Division Three club. He appeared in 16 matches for the Rovers, scoring three times.

=== Basildon United ===
For a short period of the 1997–98 season Dixon played for Basildon United in the Essex Senior League but he picked up a hamstring injury stretching to score a goal against Great Wakering Rovers in what turned out to be his last game for the club.

== International career ==
His scoring feats earned him an England call-up; he made his debut against Mexico in 1985 during a friendly international tournament in Mexico City. Three days later Dixon scored twice and set up Bryan Robson for the other in England's 3–0 win over West Germany. He scored two more four days later against the USA in Los Angeles.

=== 1986 World Cup ===
After his injury in 1985, he was nevertheless selected for the England squad for the 1986 FIFA World Cup but the presence of Lineker and Peter Beardsley in the side limited him to a six-minute substitute appearance against Poland. He played only one more game for England after that, and finished his international career with eight caps and four goals.

== Managerial career ==
=== Doncaster Rovers ===
After his playing days were over, he became Doncaster's player-manager, but was sacked in August 1997.

=== Boreham Wood, Letchworth and Hitchin Town ===
Since then, Dixon has had stints coaching non-League sides Boreham Wood, Letchworth, and Hitchin Town.

== Personal life ==
Dixon does occasional work for Chelsea TV. He commentated on Chelsea matches with Gary Taphouse from 2002 to 2008 on both the club's own digital radio station, then on Smooth FM. He is also involved with matchday hospitality at the club. He was also joint manager at Dunstable alongside Paul Reeves and involved in community work in the area.

In June 2014, he was charged with a class-A drugs offence. The charge was subsequently dropped.

In June 2015, Dixon was found guilty of assault of a man in a pub in Dunstable. On 19 June 2015, he was jailed for nine months for the offence.

In October 2016, in an interview with the BBC, he spoke of his long term addiction to gambling and how he was working as a heating engineer's assistant.

His father Mike was also a footballer.

== Career statistics ==
Appearances and goals by club, season and competition
Club	Season	League			FA Cup		League Cup		Other		Total	
Club	Season	Division	Apps	Goals	Apps	Goals	Apps	Goals	Apps	Goals	Apps	Goals
Reading
Reading	1980–81	Third Division	39	13	1	0	4	0	—		44	13
Reading	1981–82	Third Division	42	12	1	0	1	0	3 (Note: Appearances in Group Cup)	0	47	12
Reading	1982–83	Third Division	35	26	1	0	1	0	4	6	41	32
Reading	Total		116	51	3	0	6	0	7	6	132	57
Chelsea
Chelsea	1983–84	Second Division	42	28	1	0	5	6	—		48	34
Chelsea	1984–85	First Division	41	24	2	4	10	8	—		53	36
Chelsea	1985–86	First Division	38	14	2	0	7	5	4 (Note: Appearances in Full Members' Cup)	4	51	23
Chelsea	1986–87	First Division	36	10	3	0	3	1	1	1	43	12
Chelsea	1987–88	First Division	33	11	2	1	2	0	6 (Note: Appearances in Full Members' Cup (2 appearances, 1 goal) and play-offs (4 appearances, 1 goal))	2	43	14
Chelsea	1988–89	Second Division	39	25	1	0	2	1	2	2	44	28
Chelsea	1989–90	First Division	38	20	3	2	2	0	6	3	49	25
Chelsea	1990–91	First Division	33	10	1	1	8	4	2	0	44	15
Chelsea	1991–92	First Division	35	5	5	0	2	0	3	1	45	6
Chelsea	Total		335	147	20	8	41	25	24	13	420	193
Southampton	1992–93	Premier League	9	2	1	0	2	0	—		12	2
Luton Town
Luton Town	1992–93	First Division	17	3	0	0	0	0	—		17	3
Luton Town	1993–94	First Division	29	9	6	0	0	0	2 (Note: Appearances in Anglo-Italian Cup)	1	37	10
Luton Town	1994–95	First Division	29	7	3	0	2	0	—		34	7
Luton Town	Total		75	19	9	0	2	0	2	1	88	20
Millwall
Millwall	1994–95	First Division	9	4	0	0	0	0	—		9	4
Millwall	1995–96	First Division	22	5	1	0	3	0	—		26	5
Millwall	Total		31	9	1	0	3	0	0	0	35	9
Watford	1995–96	First Division	11	0	0	0	0	0	—		11	0
Doncaster Rovers	1996–97	Third Division	16	3	1	0	2	0	1 (Note: Appearances in EFL Trophy)	0	20	3
Career total			593	231	35	8	56	25	34	20	718	284

== Honours ==
Chelsea

- Football League Second Division: 1988–89
- Full Members' Cup: 1989–90

== Bibliography ==
- Dixon, Kerry (1986). Kerry: The Autobiography. Macdonald. ISBN 9780356123554.
- Worrall, Mark; Barker, Kelvin; Johnstone, David (2009). Chelsea here Chelsea there : Gate 17 paperback. ISBN 978-0-9557459-3-5.
- Cheshire, Scott (1998). Chelsea: an Illustrated History. Breedon Books. ISBN 1-85983-143-5.
- Glanvill, Rick (2006). Chelsea FC: The Official Biography – The Definitive Story of the First 100 Years. Headline Book Publishing Ltd. ISBN 0-7553-1466-2.
