= Dave Beasant =

English footballer (born 1959)

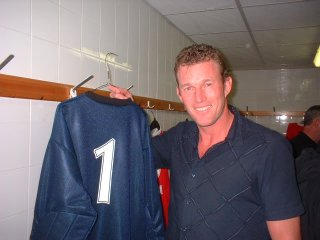
- Beasant in 2003

Personal information
- Full name: David John Beasant
- Date of birth: 20 March 1959 (age 67)
- Place of birth: Willesden, London, England
- Height: 6 ft 4 in (1.93 m)
- Position: Goalkeeper

Senior career*
Years	Team	Apps	(Gls)
1978–1979	Edgware Town		(0)
1979–1988	Wimbledon	340	(0)
1988–1989	Newcastle United	20	(0)
1989–1993	Chelsea	133	(0)
1992	→ Grimsby Town (loan)	6	(0)
1992	→ Wolverhampton Wanderers (loan)	4	(0)
1993–1997	Southampton	88	(0)
1997	→ Nottingham Forest (loan)	11	(0)
1997–2001	Nottingham Forest	128	(0)
2001–2002	Portsmouth	8	(0)
2001	Tottenham Hotspur	0	(0)
2002	Portsmouth	19	(0)
2002	Bradford City	0	(0)
2002	Wigan Athletic	0	(0)
2003	Brighton & Hove Albion	16	(0)
2003–2004	Fulham	0	(0)
2013	North Greenford United	1	(0)
2014–2015	Stevenage	0	(0)
Total		774	(0)

International career
1989–1991	England B	7	(0)
1989	England	2	(0)
- * Club domestic league appearances and goals

David John Beasant (/ˈbɛsənt/; born 20 March 1959) is an English football coach and former goalkeeper.

As a player, he was a goalkeeper, who notably played top-flight football for Wimbledon, Newcastle United, Chelsea, Southampton and Nottingham Forest. He also was on the books at Premier League teams Tottenham Hotspur, Wigan Athletic and Fulham, but failed to make an appearance for either. He spent the rest of his career in the Football League with Grimsby Town, Wolverhampton Wanderers, Portsmouth, Bradford City and Brighton & Hove Albion, as well as with non-league sides Edgware Town and North Greenford United. He played in Wimbledon's 1988 FA Cup victory, during which he became the first goalkeeper to save a penalty in an FA Cup final, and the first goalkeeper since 1875 to lift the cup as captain of the winning team. He made two appearances for the England national football team. On 10 May 2015, Beasant became the oldest individual to be selected in the squad for a match in Football League history while representing Stevenage, as a substitute against Southend United in the League Two play-off semi-final second leg, at the age of 56.

Since retiring, Beasant has worked as a goalkeeping coach for Fulham, Northern Ireland, the Glenn Hoddle Academy, Bristol Rovers, Stevenage and Reading.

== Football career ==
=== Wimbledon ===
Beasant entered the Football League in 1979 at the age of 20 when Wimbledon, newly promoted to the Third Division, signed him from his local non-league club Edgware Town. He made his debut for Wimbledon against Blackpool on 12 January 1980 and played once again that season, in which Wimbledon were relegated. He became a regular first team player the following campaign, when they were promoted, and he stayed loyal to the club even when they were relegated again in 1982. He was a key player in the side that then won the Fourth Division title in 1983, won promotion from the Third Division a year later, and completed a four-season rise to the First Division in 1986 in only their ninth season as a Football League team. After their promotion in 1986, Wimbledon rose to the top of the First Division in early September before finishing sixth at the end of the 1986–87 season.

He became the first goalkeeper to save a penalty in an FA Cup final when he blocked John Aldridge's spot-kick for Liverpool in 1988, and in doing so helped Wimbledon secure a 1–0 win. He was also the first goalkeeper to captain his team in an FA Cup final since Major William Merriman in 1875. His ability to kick the ball some considerable distance fitted in well with the "long ball" style of play Wimbledon were known for in the 1980s, nor was he afraid to move out of the area and upfield before kicking the ball, or to take free kicks.

=== Newcastle United ===
However, the 1988 FA Cup final was the last game that Beasant played for Wimbledon. A month later he was sold to Newcastle United for £850,000.

=== Chelsea ===
Beasant's spell on Tyneside was brief as the Magpies struggled and were finally relegated from the First Division in bottom place. Beasant had left in January 1989 to join Chelsea. He immediately became first choice keeper, replacing Roger Freestone. Between 1981 and 1990 (across most of his time with Wimbledon, the season at Newcastle and the start of his Chelsea spell) he made 394 consecutive league appearances, the second-highest sequence in English football history.

In September 1992, two mistakes in a match against Norwich City led to Chelsea manager Ian Porterfield telling the media that Beasant would never play for the club again, although in fact he returned to the side when Porterfield was sacked later that season.

During the 1993–94 season Beasant sustained an unusual injury when, while making a sandwich in his kitchen, he dropped a 2 kg glass bottle of salad cream on his foot, severing the tendon to his big toe. As a result, he missed eight weeks of the season.

Following the arrival of new manager, Glenn Hoddle, who opted for Dmitri Kharine as his first choice keeper with Kevin Hitchcock in reserve, Beasant was unable to get back into the Chelsea squad and looked for a new club.

=== Southampton ===
Beasant signed for Southampton in November 1993 for a fee of £300,000 to replace the recently departed Tim Flowers. Beasant made his debut in a 1–0 defeat at Everton on 4 December; despite a run of four defeats, his confidence gradually returned, and he soon became a favourite with The Dell crowd. With the departure of Ian Branfoot and his replacement as manager by Alan Ball, the "Saints" eventually climbed out of the relegation zone, finishing the 1993–94 season one point above relegated Sheffield United.

At the start of the 1994–95 season, he was replaced by Bruce Grobbelaar but was restored as first-choice keeper for the last month of the season. Following Alan Ball's move to Manchester City in the summer of 1995, new manager Dave Merrington preferred Beasant in goal. The team struggled throughout the season, and were never far from the relegation zone, but finished level on points but with a better goal difference than Ball's Manchester City who were relegated. Beasant himself finished the season by being voted the club's Player of the Season.

For the 1996–97 season, Graeme Souness was appointed manager; initially, Souness kept faith with Beasant but after a series of injuries (during which Saints took Chris Woods on loan), Souness signed Maik Taylor from Barnet in January. Beasant's final first-team game for Southampton was a 1–0 defeat against Liverpool on 29 December 1996. Following the arrival of Paul Jones in the summer of 1997, Beasant was now only third-choice 'keeper, and after a loan move to Nottingham Forest in August 1997, the transfer was made permanent in November. In his four years at The Dell, he made a total of 105 appearances in all competitions.

=== Later career ===
In November 1997, he signed for Nottingham Forest at 38 years old, after a short period on loan. He spent four years at the City Ground, during which time they were relegated from the Premier League one season after promotion. He went on to become Forest's oldest ever player at 42. He then signed for Portsmouth in August 2001 after their regular goalkeeper Aaron Flahavan was killed in a car crash.

In November 2001 Beasant terminated his contract at Portsmouth and signed for Tottenham Hotspur on a two-month contract.

He played his last competitive game in the 2002–03 season for Brighton & Hove Albion in Division One at the age of 43, although he did spend the 2003–04 season registered as a player with Fulham in the FA Premier League. By then he was the oldest player registered with any professional club in England. He came out of retirement on 17 August 2013 to play for Southern League Division One Central club North Greenford United in a 2–0 defeat against Chalfont St Peter.

Having joined Stevenage as the club's goalkeeping coach in the middle of 2014, Beasant was named as a substitute for an away match at Carlisle United on 11 October 2014, aged 55.

== International career ==
Beasant was selected to play two full international matches for England by manager Bobby Robson. The first of Beasant's two England caps came at Wembley Stadium on 15 November 1989 against Italy in a friendly match, where he replaced Peter Shilton as a half-time substitute and kept a clean sheet in a 0–0 draw. The following month on 13 December, also at Wembley, he made his second appearance in a friendly against Yugoslavia, again as a half-time substitute in a 2–1 win for England. He was a member of England's 1990 FIFA World Cup squad, having been called up after David Seaman had to withdraw through injury.

== Coaching career ==
By the time of his retirement, Beasant had been appointed as a goalkeeping coach at Fulham in addition to serving as goalkeeping coach for Northern Ireland under former Wimbledon teammate Lawrie Sanchez. Beasant resigned from the Northern Ireland post in 2007 after Sanchez was appointed Fulham manager only for the pair to both be sacked by the club in December 2007.

Beasant was a senior coach at the Glenn Hoddle Academy. He joined in 2008 and worked not only with the academy's goalkeepers, but also outfield players, especially defenders. In August 2012, Beasant was appointed part-time goalkeeper coach at Bristol Rovers. In July 2014, he became goalkeeping coach at Stevenage where he joined his son Sam Beasant. On 25 June 2015, he was appointed as goalkeeping coach at Reading. On 22 December 2018, Beasant was released after the club appointed Jose Gomes to replace Paul Clement as manager.

== Career statistics ==
Appearances and goals by club, season and competition
Club	Season	League			FA Cup		League Cup		Other		Total	
Club	Season	Division	Apps	Goals	Apps	Goals	Apps	Goals	Apps	Goals	Apps	Goals
Wimbledon
Wimbledon	1979–80	Third Division	2	0	0	0	0	0	—		2	0
Wimbledon	1980–81	Fourth Division	34	0	5	0	0	0	—		39	0
Wimbledon	1981–82	Third Division	46	0	2	0	2	0	5 (Note: Appearances in Group Cup)	0	55	0
Wimbledon	1982–83	Fourth Division	46	0	2	0	2	0	3	0	53	0
Wimbledon	1983–84	Third Division	46	0	2	0	6	0	1 (Note: Appearances in Associate Members' Cup)	0	55	0
Wimbledon	1984–85	Second Division	42	0	5	0	2	0	—		49	0
Wimbledon	1985–86	Second Division	42	0	1	0	3	0	—		46	0
Wimbledon	1986–87	First Division	42	0	4	0	2	0	1 (Note: Appearances in Full Members' Cup)	0	49	0
Wimbledon	1987–88	First Division	40	0	6	0	4	0	1	0	51	0
Wimbledon	Total		340	0	27	0	21	0	11	0	399	0
Newcastle United	1988–89	First Division	20	0	2	0	2	0	3 (Note: Appearances in Full Members' Cup (1 appearance) and Football League Centenary Trophy (2 appearances)	0	27	0
Chelsea
Chelsea	1988–89	Second Division	22	0	—		—		—		22	0
Chelsea	1989–90	First Division	38	0	3	0	2	0	6	0	49	0
Chelsea	1990–91	First Division	35	0	1	0	8	0	2	0	46	0
Chelsea	1991–92	First Division	21	0	1	0	1	0	—		23	0
Chelsea	1992–93	Premier League	17	0	—		0	0	—		17	0
Chelsea	Total		133	0	5	0	11	0	8	0	157	0
Grimsby Town (loan)	1992–93	First Division	6	0	—		0	0	—		6	0
Wolverhampton Wanderers (loan)	1992–93	First Division	4	0	1	0	0	0	—		5	0
Southampton
Southampton	1993–94	Premier League	25	0	2	0	0	0	—		27	0
Southampton	1994–95	Premier League	13	0	0	0	0	0	—		13	0
Southampton	1995–96	Premier League	36	0	6	0	4	0	—		46	0
Southampton	1996–97	Premier League	14	0	1	0	4	0	—		19	0
Southampton	Total		88	0	9	0	8	0	0	0	105	0
Nottingham Forest (loan)	1997–98	First Division	11	0	0	0	2	0	—		13	0
Nottingham Forest
Nottingham Forest	1997–98	First Division	30	0	1	0	0	0	—		31	0
Nottingham Forest	1998–99	Premier League	26	0	1	0	3	0	—		30	0
Nottingham Forest	1999–2000	First Division	27	0	3	0	2	0	—		32	0
Nottingham Forest	2000–01	First Division	45	0	1	0	2	0	—		48	0
Nottingham Forest	Total		128	0	6	0	7	0	0	0	141	0
Portsmouth	2001–02	First Division	8	0	0	0	1	0	—		9	0
Tottenham Hotspur	2001–02	Premier League	0	0	0	0	0	0	—		0	0
Portsmouth	2001–02	First Division	19	0	0	0	0	0	—		19	0
Bradford City	2002–03	First Division	0	0	0	0	0	0	—		0	0
Wigan Athletic	2002–03	Second Division	0	0	0	0	0	0	1 (Note: Appearances in EFL Trophy)	0	1	0
Brighton & Hove Albion	2002–03	First Division	16	0	0	0	0	0	—		16	0
Fulham	2003–04	Premier League	0	0	0	0	0	0	—		0	0
Nottingham Forest	2007–08	League One	0	0	0	0	0	0	—		0	0
North Greenford United	2013–14	Southern Division One Central	1	0	0	0	0	0	—		1	0
Stevenage	2014–15	League Two	0	0	0	0	0	0	—		0	0
Career total			774	0	50	0	52	0	23	0	899	0

== Honours ==
Wimbledon

- Football League Third Division runner-up: 1983–84
- Football League Fourth Division: 1982–83
- FA Cup: 1987–88
- Football League Group Cup runner-up: 1981–82

Chelsea

- Football League Second Division: 1988–89
- Full Members' Cup: 1989–90

Nottingham Forest

- Football League First Division: 1997–98
