= 1987–88 Chelsea F.C. season =

English football club season

Chelsea
1987–88 season
- Chairman: Ken Bates
- Manager: John Hollins; Bobby Campbell
- Stadium: Stamford Bridge
- First Division: 18th (relegated)
- FA Cup: Fourth round
- League Cup: Second round
- Full Members Cup: Third round
- Top goalscorer: League: Gordon Durie (12); All: Gordon Durie (20)
- Highest home attendance: 40,550 vs Middlesbrough (28 May 1988)
- Lowest home attendance: 8,501 vs Barnsley (18 November 1987)
- Average home league attendance: 20,407
- Biggest win: 4–1 v Blackburn Rovers (18 May 1988)
- Biggest defeat: 0–4 v Swindon Town (19 January 1988)
Home colours	Away colours

The 1987–88 season was Chelsea Football Club's seventy-fourth competitive season. The club suffered a difficult season, ultimately finishing 18th and being relegated after a 2-1 aggregate defeat in a two-legged playoff final to Second Division club Middlesbrough. The season represents the last time Chelsea have been relegated from the top flight of English football.

== Table ==
Pos	Team	Pld	W	D	L	GF	GA	GD	Pts	Qualification or relegation
16	West Ham United	40	9	15	16	40	52	−12	42	
17	Charlton Athletic	40	9	15	16	38	52	−14	42	
18	Chelsea (R)	40	9	15	16	50	68	−18	42	Qualified for Second Division play-offs
19	Portsmouth (R)	40	7	14	19	36	66	−30	35	Relegated to Second Division
20	Watford (R)	40	7	11	22	27	51	−24	32	Relegated to Second Division

Source: World Football
Rules for classification: 1) Points; 2) Goal difference; 3) Goals scored
(R) Relegated
