= ASD Roccella =

Italian football club

Roccella
- Full name: Associazione Sportiva Dilettantistica Roccella
- Founded: 1935
- Stadium: Stadio Ninetto Muscolo, Roccella Ionica, Italy
- Capacity: 1500
- Manager: Francesco Galati
- League: Promotion 2026-27
- 2025-26: First Category, Group C, 1st (promoted)

Associazione Sportiva Dilettantistica Roccella is an Italian association football club, based in Roccella Ionica, Calabria. They currently play in the Promotion, the 6th tier of Italian football, and 3rd tier of dilettants

== History ==
=== Foundation ===
The club was founded in 1935.

=== Serie D ===
In the season 2013–14 the team was promoted for the first time, from Eccellenza Calabria to Serie D, avoiding the relegation for 6 consecutive years and playing in this category for 7 till the season 2020-21 when the team was relegated again in Eccellenza Calabria

=== First Category ===
After years of relegations and battle for salvation, in the season 2025-26 the team won the First Category group C championship, gaining access to the 2026-27 Promotion championship
