= Graham Stuart (footballer) =

English footballer and sports commentator

Personal information
- Full name: Graham Charles Stuart
- Date of birth: 24 October 1970 (age 56)
- Place of birth: Tooting, England
- Height: 1.75 m (5 ft 9 in)
- Positions: Midfielder; forward

Youth career
- –1989: Chelsea

Senior career*
Years	Team	Apps	(Gls)
1989–1993	Chelsea	87	(14)
1993–1997	Everton	136	(22)
1997–1999	Sheffield United	53	(11)
1999–2005	Charlton Athletic	148	(21)
2005	Norwich City	8	(0)
Total		432	(68)

International career
1990–1991	England U21	5	(2)
- * Club domestic league appearances and goals

Graham Charles Stuart (born 24 October 1970) is an English former professional footballer and sports commentator.

As a player, he was an attacking midfielder and forward from 1989 until 2005. He spent the majority of his career in the Premier League, playing in the top tier of English football for Chelsea, Everton, Charlton Athletic and Norwich City. He also had a two-year spell with Sheffield United, and was capped 5 times, scoring twice for England U21.

== Playing career ==
Stuart had spells at Everton, Chelsea, Sheffield United and Charlton Athletic. At Chelsea he was part of a new young midfield, he played mainly wide right, with Graeme Le Saux on the left. His most notable moment for Chelsea came with a stunning solo goal against Sheffield Wednesday in the first month of the newly formed Premier League. Stuart spent the majority of his Everton career playing as a right midfielder, but did also spend time playing as a centre-forward (including the victories in the 1995 FA Cup semi-final and final). During his time he won the FA Cup in 1995, beating Manchester United 1–0 in the final at Wembley; his shot from inside the penalty area hit the bar, but Paul Rideout headed the ball into the empty net.

Nicknamed 'Diamond' during this time at Everton, Stuart's most famous moment in a blue shirt came on 7 May 1994. He scored two goals as Mike Walker's Everton defeated Wimbledon at Goodison Park on the final day of the season to escape relegation by the slimmest of margins. He scored the winning goal nine minutes from time, completing a comeback after the Blues had fallen 2–0 down in the game.

Stuart joined Norwich City in 2005. He played eight games for the club before being forced to retire due to injury.

== After football ==
Since his retirement from professional football in August 2005, at the age of 34, Stuart has done occasional television work for Sky Sports and worked at a financial management company which represents the interests of other sportspeople. He works as an Everton club ambassador and as a commentator for Everton.

== Career statistics ==
Source: Graham Stuart at the English National Football Archive (subscription required)

Appearances and goals by club, season and competition
Club	Season	League			FA Cup		League Cup		Other		Total	
Club	Season	Division	Apps	Goals	Apps	Goals	Apps	Goals	Apps	Goals	Apps	Goals
Chelsea	1989–90	First Division	2	1	0	0	0	0	0	0	2	1
Chelsea	1990–91	First Division	19	4	1	0	5	1	2 (Note: Appearances in Full Members' Cup)	1	27	6
Chelsea	1991–92	First Division	27	0	5	1	0	0	3	0	35	1
Chelsea	1992–93	Premier League	39	9	1	0	6	1	—		46	10
Chelsea	Total		87	14	7	1	11	2	5	1	110	18
Everton	1993–94	Premier League	30	3	2	0	2	0	—		34	3
Everton	1994–95	Premier League	28	3	5	2	2	1	—		35	6
Everton	1995–96	Premier League	29	9	4	3	1	1	3 (Note: Appearances in UEFA Cup Winners' Cup)	1	37	14
Everton	1996–97	Premier League	35	5	2	0	1	0	—		38	5
Everton	1997–98	Premier League	14	2	—		3	1	—		17	3
Everton	Total		136	22	13	5	9	3	3	1	161	31
Sheffield United	1997–98	First Division	28	5	6	0	—		1 (Note: Appearances in First Division play-offs)	0	35	5
Sheffield United	1998–99	First Division	25	6	5	1	4	0	—		34	7
Sheffield United	Total		53	11	11	1	4	0	1	0	69	12
Charlton Athletic	1998–99	Premier League	9	3	—		—		—		9	3
Charlton Athletic	1999–2000	First Division	37	7	3	0	2	0	—		42	7
Charlton Athletic	2000–01	Premier League	35	5	2	0	0	0	—		37	5
Charlton Athletic	2001–02	Premier League	31	3	2	2	2	0	—		35	5
Charlton Athletic	2002–03	Premier League	4	0	0	0	0	0	—		4	0
Charlton Athletic	2003–04	Premier League	28	3	1	0	2	0	—		31	3
Charlton Athletic	2004–05	Premier League	4	0	0	0	2	0	—		6	0
Charlton Athletic	Total		148	21	8	2	8	0	—		164	23
Norwich City	2004–05	Premier League	8	0	—		—		—		8	0
Career total			432	68	39	9	32	5	9	2	512	84

== Honours ==
Everton

- FA Cup: 1994–95

Charlton Athletic

- Football League First Division: 1999–2000
