= Erland Johnsen =

Norwegian footballer and manager (born 1967)

Personal information
- Full name: Erland Johnsen
- Date of birth: 5 April 1967 (age 59)
- Place of birth: Fredrikstad, Norway
- Height: 1.83 m (6 ft 0 in)
- Position: Centre back

Team information
- Current team: Sarpsborg 08 FF (Youth Director)

Youth career
- Eika Fotballklubb

Senior career*
Years	Team	Apps	(Gls)
1983–1988	Moss		
1988–1989	Bayern Munich	21	(0)
1989–1997	Chelsea	145	(1)
1997–1998	Rosenborg	12	(0)
1998–1999	Strømsgodset	11	(0)
Total		189	(1)

International career
1982–1983	Norway U16	3	(0)
1983–1984	Norway U19	11	(1)
1985–1987	Norway U21	16	(0)
1987–1995	Norway	24	(2)

Managerial career
- 1999–2002: Strømsgodset (assistant)
- 2002–2003: Moss
- 2003–2006: Follo
- 2006–2011: Lillestrøm (development coach)
- 2008: Lillestrøm (caretaker)
- 2012–2013: Strømmen
- 2014–2018: Norway U15 + U16 + U17
- 2019–: Sarpsborg 08 Youth
- * Club domestic league appearances and goals

Erland Johnsen (born 5 April 1967) is a Norwegian football manager and former professional footballer who is director of youth at Sarpsborg 08 FF.

As a player he was a centre back from 1983 until 1999, notably in the Premier League for Chelsea and in the Bundesliga for Bayern Munich. He also played for Moss, Rosenborg and Strømsgodset and earned 24 caps for Norway.

He moved into management in 1999 with Strømsgodset and later with Moss, Follo, Lillestrøm and Strømmen.

== Club career ==
His playing career began in Moss, and he later joined Bayern Munich as a professional. During his two seasons at the club he was involved in two championships in 1989 and 1990.

In December 1989, he transferred to English team Chelsea, where he played for eight seasons and was voted player of the year for the club in 1995. He scored his only goal for the club against Southampton in April 1994. Whilst at Chelsea he played in the 1994 FA Cup Final. Chelsea won the 1996–97 FA Cup; in the fifth round against Leicester City FC at Stamford Bridge, Johnsen went down in the penalty area in the final minutes of extra time and referee Mike Reed awarded a penalty to Chelsea. The penalty was converted by Frank Leboeuf and secured a 1–0 win for Chelsea. It was considered by The Guardian's Scott Murray as one of the six worst referee decisions ever. Johnsen was left out of the squad for the final but played in the semi-final against Wimbledon. Shortly after this he returned to his native Norway where he played for Rosenborg and finally Strømsgodset before retiring in June 1999.

== International career ==
Johnsen was a central defender who was capped 19 times for the Norwegian national team, participating in the 1994 World Cup. He also won five caps during Norway's unsuccessful qualification campaign for 1988 Olympics, although these are not recognized as full internationals by FIFA. He made 16 under-21 appearances for Norway. Perhaps the most famous moment in Johnsen's career came on 15 November 1989, during a match between Norway and Scotland, at Hampden Park, where he scored a goal from the middle of the pitch. The goal went around the world, even making CNN's "Play of the Day". It also caught the interest of Chelsea who purchased Johnsen later that same year. Legendary Scottish goalkeeper Jim Leighton said about the shot twenty years later: "I'm never allowed to forget about it in Scotland, it is the furthest I've ever lost a goal from." Johnsen reconstructed the goal together with Leighton in 2009 on the Norwegian sports entertainment show Golden Goal.

== Managerial career ==
Johnsen remained with Strømsgodset as an assistant coach for the next three years after he retired as a footballer. Later he had spells with Moss (2002–2003) and Follo (2003–2006). He also worked for Lillestrøm as a player developer.

After Tom Nordlie resigned on 29 May 2008, Johnsen stepped in as caretaker, together with former Chelsea teammate Frode Grodås.

In January 2012, he agreed to coach Strømmen.

Ahead of the 2019 season he became youth director of Sarpsborg 08 FF.

== Career statistics ==
=== Club ===
Appearances and goals by club, season and competition
Club	Season	League			Cup (Note: Includes appearances in Norwegian Cup, DFB-Pokal and FA Cup)		League Cup (Note: Includes Football League Cup)		Europe		Other (Note: Includes Tippeligaen play-offs, DFL-Supercup and Full Members' Cup)		Total	
Club	Season	Division	Apps	Goals	Apps	Goals	Apps	Goals	Apps	Goals	Apps	Goals	Apps	Goals
Moss	1983	1. Divisjon	0	0	0	0	—		—		—		0	0
Moss	1984	1. Divisjon	0	0	0	0	—		0	0	2	0	2	0
Moss	1985	1. Divisjon	22	1	2(?)	0(?)	—		—		1	0	25	1
Moss	1986	2. Divisjon	22(?)	1(?)	2(?)	1(?)	—		—		—		24	2
Moss	1987	1. Divisjon	22	0	3(?)	1	—		—		—		25	1
Moss	1988	1. Divisjon	11	0	3(?)	1	—		0	0	—		14	1
Moss	Total		77	2	10	3	0	0	0	0	3	0	90	5
Bayern Munich	1988–89	Bundesliga	13	0	1	0	—		5	1	—		19	1
Bayern Munich	1989–90	Bundesliga	8	0	0	0	—		2	0	0	0	10	0
Bayern Munich	Total		21	0	1	0	0	0	7	1	0	0	29	1
Chelsea	1989–90	First Division	18	0	3	0	0	0	—		4	0	25	0
Chelsea	1990–91	First Division	6	0	1	0	0	0	—		0	0	7	0
Chelsea	1991–92	First Division	7	0	0	0	0	0	—		0	0	7	0
Chelsea	1992–93	Premier League	13	0	0	0	0	0	—		—		13	0
Chelsea	1993–94	Premier League	28	1	8	0	1	0	—		—		37	1
Chelsea	1994–95	Premier League	33	0	2	0	3	0	8	0	—		46	0
Chelsea	1995–96	Premier League	22	0	2	0	2	0	—		—		26	0
Chelsea	1996–97	Premier League	18	0	3	0	1	0	—		—		22	0
Chelsea	Total		145	1	19	0	7	0	8	0	4	0	183	1
Rosenborg	1997	Tippeligaen	6	0	1	0	—		0	0	—		6	0
Rosenborg	1998	Tippeligaen	6	0	0	0	—		0	0	—		7	0
Rosenborg	Total		12	0	1	0	0	0	0	0	0	0	13	0
Strømsgodset	1998	Tippeligaen	7	0	0	0	—		3	0	—		10	0
Strømsgodset	1999	Tippeligaen	4	0	0	0	—		—		—		4	0
Strømsgodset	Total		11	0	0	0	0	0	3	0	0	0	14	0
Career total			266	3	31	3	7	0	18	1	7	0	329	7

=== International ===
Appearances and goals by national team and year
National team	Year	Apps	Goals
Norway	1987	4	0
Norway	1988	6	0
Norway	1989	4	1
Norway	1990	4	1
Norway	1991	0	0
Norway	1992	0	0
Norway	1993	0	0
Norway	1994	3	0
Norway	1995	3	0
Total		24	2

Scores and results list Norway's goal tally first, score column indicates score after each Johnsen goal.

List of international goals scored by Erland Johnsen
No.	Date	Venue	Opponent	Score	Result	Competition
1	15 November 1989	Hampden Park, Glasgow, Scotland	Scotland	1–1	1–1	1990 World Cup qualifier
2	27 March 1990	Windsor Park, Belfast, Northern Ireland	Northern Ireland	3–2	3–2	Friendly

== Honours ==
Moss

- Tippeligaen: 1987

Bayern Munich

- Bundesliga: 1988–89, 1989–90

Chelsea

- Full Members' Cup: 1989–90
- FA Cup runner-up: 1993–94

Rosenborg

- Tippeligaen: 1997, 1998

Individual

- Chelsea Player of the Year: 1995
