= 1988–89 Chelsea F.C. season =

English football club season

Chelsea
1988–89 season
- Chairman: Ken Bates
- Manager: Bobby Campbell
- Stadium: Stamford Bridge
- Second Division: 1st (promoted)
- FA Cup: Third round
- League Cup: Second round
- Full Members Cup: Third round
- Top goalscorer: League: Kerry Dixon (25); All: Kerry Dixon (28)
- Highest home attendance: 30,332 vs Leeds United (22 April 1989)
- Lowest home attendance: 5,341 vs Bradford City (30 November 1988)
- Average home league attendance: 15,957
- Biggest win: 7–0 v Walsall (4 February 1989)
- Biggest defeat: 1–4 (two matches)
Home colours	Away colours

The 1988–89 season was Chelsea Football Club's seventy-fifth competitive season. The club returned to the First Division at the first attempt by winning the Second Division championship. Due to crowd trouble following the Football League play-off match against Middlesbrough the previous season, the Stamford Bridge terraces were closed for the first six home games of the season. This is the most recent season to date that Chelsea have played outside of the First Division or later Premier League, as they have continuously been a top-flight club since.

== Table ==
Pos	Team	Pld	W	D	L	GF	GA	GD	Pts	Qualification or relegation
1	Chelsea (C, P)	46	29	12	5	96	50	+46	99	Promotion to the First Division
2	Manchester City (P)	46	23	13	10	77	53	+24	82	Promotion to the First Division
3	Crystal Palace (O, P)	46	23	12	11	71	49	+22	81	Qualification for the Second Division play-offs
4	Watford	46	22	12	12	74	48	+26	78	Qualification for the Second Division play-offs
5	Blackburn Rovers	46	22	11	13	74	59	+15	77	Qualification for the Second Division play-offs

Source: thestatcat.co.uk
Rules for classification: 1) Points; 2) Goal difference; 3) Goals scored
(C) Champions; (O) Play-off winners; (P) Promoted
