= Promotion =

Promotion may refer to:

== Marketing ==
- Promotion (marketing), one of the four marketing mix elements, comprising any type of marketing communication used to inform or persuade target audiences of the relative merits of a product, service, brand or issue
  - Advertising campaign, a promotional campaign
  - Film promotion
  - Promotional recording
  - Radio promotion

== Status or progress ==
- Promotion (chess), when a pawn reaches the eighth rank
- Promotion (Germany), the German term for the doctoral degree
- Promotion (rank), the advancement of an employee's rank or position in an organizational hierarchy system
- Promotion and relegation, in sports leagues, is a process where some teams are transferred between multiple divisions based on their performance for the completed season
- Social promotion, in education, is the practice of advancing a student to the next grade regardless of their completion of material from the preceding grade

== Arts, entertainment, and media ==
- Promotion (film), a 2013 Bengali film directed by Snehasish Chakraborty
- The Promotion (film), a 2008 film
- "The Promotion" (The Office), an episode of the American TV series The Office
- "The Promotion" (The Studio), an episode of the American TV series The Studio
- "The Promotion" (What We Do in the Shadows), an episode of the American TV series What We Do in the Shadows
- "Promotion" (song), 2024 song by ¥$ and Future from the album Vultures 2

== Other uses ==
- Professional wrestling promotion, a company or business that produces professional wrestling events
- ProMotion, a proprietary variable refresh rate technology by Apple
- Promotion or trump promotion; see glossary of contract bridge terms

== See also ==
- Demotion
- Promoter (entertainment)
