= Gareth Hall =

Welsh footballer

Personal information
- Full name: Gareth David Hall
- Date of birth: 20 March 1969 (age 57)
- Place of birth: Croydon, England
- Height: 5 ft 8 in (1.73 m)
- Position: Defender

Youth career
- Chelsea

Senior career*
| Years | Team | Apps | (Gls) |
| 1986–1996 | Chelsea | 138 | (4) |
| 1995 | → Sunderland (loan) | 1 | (0) |
| 1996–1998 | Sunderland | 47 | (0) |
| 1997 | → Brentford | 6 | (0) |
| 1998–2001 | Swindon Town | 87 | (3) |
| 2001–2006 | Havant & Waterlooville | | |
| Total | | 279+ | (7+) |

International career
| 1988–1992 | Wales | 9 | (0) |
- * Club domestic league appearances and goals

Gareth David Hall (born 20 March 1969) is a Welsh former international footballer of the 1980s and 1990s.

== Club career ==
=== Chelsea ===
Hall was born in Croydon. He started his career as an apprentice at Chelsea and made his first team debut on 5 May 1987 against Wimbledon, having featured in a reserve match earlier in the day. He made a total of 225 league appearances during his time at the club, although the number of matches he played was limited by the presence of Steve Clarke. Hall was a member of the Chelsea team that won the 1990 Full Members Cup at Wembley Stadium.

=== Sunderland ===
He moved to Sunderland in January 1996, having originally been on loan there. Hall went on to make 48 league appearances for the club.

=== Later career ===
Hall joined Swindon Town in May 1998 and played in most games during his first two seasons. Following the arrival of Colin Todd he was told he could leave on a free transfer, but continued training with the team and he ended up playing a few more matches for them, before leaving in May 2001 to join Havant & Waterlooville. In total he made 97 senior appearances for Swindon, scoring 3 goals.

== International career ==
He won 9 international caps for Wales, first being selected for the senior side on 23 March 1988, in a 2–1 friendly defeat to Yugoslavia. His last cap came on 29 April 1992 in a 1–1 friendly draw with Austria.

== Honours ==
Chelsea

- Football League Second Division: 1988–89
- Full Members' Cup: 1989–90

Sunderland

- Football League First Division: 1995–96
