= Ken Monkou =

Dutch footballer

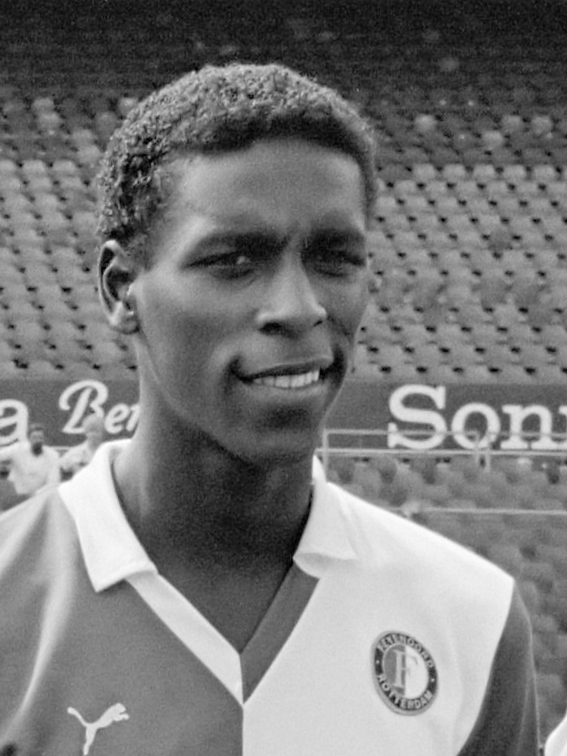
- Monkou with Feyenoord in 1985

Personal information
- Full name: Kenneth John Monkou
- Date of birth: 29 November 1964 (age 61)
- Place of birth: Nickerie, Suriname
- Height: 1.91 m (6 ft 3 in)
- Position: Centre-back

Senior career*
| Years | Team | Apps | (Gls) |
| 1985–1988 | Feyenoord | 43 | (2) |
| 1989–1992 | Chelsea | 94 | (2) |
| 1992–1999 | Southampton | 198 | (10) |
| 1999–2001 | Huddersfield Town | 21 | (1) |
| 2002–2003 | Chelsea | 0 | (0) |
| Total | | 356 | (15) |

International career
| 1988 | Netherlands (Olympic) | 1 | (0) |
- * Club domestic league appearances and goals

Kenneth John Monkou (born 29 November 1964) is a Dutch former professional footballer and pundit. Born in Suriname, he made an appearance for the Netherlands Olympic football team.

As a player, he was as a centre-back who notably played in the Premier League for both Chelsea and Southampton, where he played just under 300 league appearances for both. He had previously played in the Eredivise for Feyenoord and wound up his career in the Football League with Huddersfield Town.

Monkou is an ambassador for the Professional Footballers' Association and Show Racism the Red Card. He has also appeared as a pundit for Chelsea TV.

== Early life ==
Monkou was born in Nickerie in Suriname and was raised in the Netherlands. He became passionate about football as a child in The Hague, where he played at RK-VVP.

== Football career ==
Monkou's first major side was Feyenoord Rotterdam. He played in a reserve match against a side featuring Chelsea manager Bobby Campbell's son and moved to England in May 1989 to play for newly promoted Chelsea for £100,000. He was their first player from outside the Commonwealth of Nations since Petar Borota in 1982. He was voted club player of the year in his first season – the first black player to do so for Chelsea – as the team finished fifth in the First Division and won the Full Members Cup. He remained with Chelsea until 1992, when he was transferred to Southampton for £750,000 three months after signing a new five-year contract with Chelsea.

Southampton faced regular battles for Premier League survival, though the club was never relegated during Monkou's time there. In the 1993–94 season he scored a last minute winner in a 5–4 defeat of Norwich City from a Matt Le Tissier corner that helped the club stay in the Premier League.

He stayed on the South Coast until 1999, when he joined Huddersfield Town on a free transfer, scoring once against Yorkshire rivals Barnsley. However, disagreements with Huddersfield manager Steve Bruce ensured his time with the club was short-lived. Monkou made a return to Chelsea in 2003, playing for the reserve team, before finally retiring from the game.

== Personal life ==
Monkou's cousin Arsenio Halfhuid is also a footballer.

He ran a Dutch pancake house in the Dutch city of Delft and is actively involved in Dutch media and on Chelsea TV.

Monkou has also worked as a corporate hospitality host at Stamford Bridge, and is an ambassador for the Professional Footballers' Association and Show Racism the Red Card.

== Honours ==
Chelsea

- Full Members' Cup: 1989–90
