= Kevin Wilson (footballer, born 1961) =

Northern Irish footballer

Personal information
- Full name: Kevin James Wilson
- Date of birth: 18 April 1961 (age 65)
- Place of birth: Banbury, England
- Height: 5 ft 7 in (1.70 m)
- Position: Striker

Youth career
- Banbury United

Senior career*
Years	Team	Apps	(Gls)
1979–1985	Derby County	124	(30)
1985–1987	Ipswich Town	98	(34)
1987–1992	Chelsea	152	(42)
1992–1994	Notts County	69	(3)
1994	→ Bradford City (loan)	5	(0)
1994–1997	Walsall	125	(38)
1997–2001	Northampton Town	31	(2)
Total		604	(149)

International career
1987–1995	Northern Ireland	42	(6)

Managerial career
- 1999–2001: Northampton Town
- 2002–2003: Bedford Town
- 2003: Aylesbury United
- 2003–2005: Kettering Town
- 2005–2006: Kettering Town
- 2006–2007: Hucknall Town
- 2007–2008: Corby Town
- 2009–2010: Ilkeston Town
- 2010–2015: Ilkeston
- 2015–2016: Nuneaton Town
- 2024: Banbury United
- * Club domestic league appearances and goals

Kevin James Wilson (born 18 April 1961) is a former professional footballer who played as a striker. He was most recently manager of Banbury United. Born in England, he represented Northern Ireland internationally.

== Biography ==
Born in Banbury, Wilson started his career at Southern League club Banbury United, before signing for Derby County in 1979 for £20,000, which remains the record transfer fee received by Banbury. After Derby he played for Ipswich, Chelsea, Notts County, Bradford City, Walsall, and Northampton Town. At international level, Wilson played for Northern Ireland 42 times, scoring six goals. He is a former manager of Northampton Town, Bedford Town, Kettering Town and Hucknall Town. He was the manager of Corby Town until January 2008.

On 1 June 2009 he was appointed manager of Conference North side Ilkeston Town.

In May 2015 Wilson left Ilkeston to become manager of Nuneaton Town, following their relegation from the Conference Premier. In 2014–15 he had led Ilkeston to the Northern Premier League play-off final, where they lost to Curzon Ashton.

In January 2024, he was appointed as the manager of Banbury United.

== Honours ==
Chelsea

- Football League Second Division: 1988–89
- Full Members' Cup: 1989–90

Walsall

- Football League Third Division runner-up: 1994–95
