= David Lee (footballer, born 1969) =

English footballer (born 1969)

Personal information
- Full name: David John Lee
- Date of birth: 26 November 1969 (age 56)
- Place of birth: Kingswood, England
- Height: 6 ft 2 in (1.88 m)
- Position: Central defender

Youth career
- 1983–1988: Chelsea

Senior career*
Years	Team	Apps	(Gls)
1988–1998	Chelsea	151	(11)
1992	→ Reading (loan)	5	(5)
1992	→ Plymouth Argyle (loan)	9	(1)
1994	→ Portsmouth (loan)	5	(0)
1997	→ Sheffield United (loan)	5	(0)
1998–1999	Bristol Rovers	11	(1)
1999	Crystal Palace	0	(0)
1999–2000	Colchester United	0	(0)
2000	Exeter City	5	(0)
2000–2001	Parramatta Power	11	(2)
2001–2002	Havant & Waterlooville	0	(0)
2002	Forest Green Rovers	6	(1)
2002–2003	Weston-super-Mare	2	(1)
2003–2004	Mangotsfield United	14	(0)
Total		223	(22)

International career
1988-1992	England U21	10	(0)
- 2011: Northampton Town (assistant)
- * Club domestic league appearances and goals

David John Lee (born 26 November 1969) is an English football coach and former professional player.

Lee played as a defender from 1988 until 2004, notably played in the Premier League for Chelsea and in the Australian top flight for Parramatta Power. He also played in the Football League for Reading, Plymouth Argyle, Portsmouth, Sheffield United, Bristol Rovers, Crystal Palace, Colchester United and Exeter City. He then went on to play in Non-league for Havant & Waterlooville, Forest Green Rovers, Weston-super-Mare, Yate Town and Mangotsfield United. He was capped ten times by England U21.

After retiring became a scout for Bristol City and later assistant manager of Northampton Town where he briefly managed in a caretaker role.

== Playing career ==
Lee spent most of his career at Chelsea, whom he joined as a junior in 1983. He made his club debut on 1 October 1988 against Leicester City, scoring in a 2–1 win. In ten years with Chelsea, Lee made 196 appearances, but struggled to cement a regular place in the starting line-up. As a result, his time with Chelsea was punctuated by brief loan spells with Reading, Plymouth Argyle, Portsmouth and Sheffield United. He only made one league appearance in his final full season with Chelsea (1997/98), playing the full 90 minutes of a 3–1 defeat at Leeds United on 8 April 1998. This was his first league game since playing against Tottenham Hotspur on 26 October 1996. The Tottenham match was an emotional and incident packed game for Lee and his teammates. It was the first match since the death of Chelsea chairman Matthew Harding. Lee scored a penalty to put Chelsea in the lead, but was later stretchered off with a broken leg as a result of a challenge from Sol Campbell.

Seeking regular football, Lee joined Bristol Rovers on a free transfer in 1998 and later had spells at Crystal Palace, Exeter City, Parramatta Power, Havant & Waterlooville and Forest Green Rovers.

== Coaching career ==
Lee was chief scout with Bristol City from June 2010 until he resigned on 16 May 2011 citing a wish for a new challenge. In June 2011 Lee was appointed as assistant manager to Gary Johnson at Northampton Town. After Johnson left Northampton by mutual consent in November 2011, Lee was placed in temporary charge of the first team, assisted by player-coach Andy Holt. Lee lasted only one game in charge of Northampton; a 7–2 defeat to Shrewsbury Town, before being replaced on 22 November by Tim Flowers.

== Honours ==
Chelsea

- Football League Second Division: 1988–89
