= Bobby Campbell (English footballer) =

English footballer and manager

Personal information
- Full name: Robert George Campbell
- Date of birth: 23 April 1937
- Place of birth: Liverpool, England
- Date of death: 6 November 2015 (aged 78)
- Position: Wing half

Senior career*
Years	Team	Apps	(Gls)
1958–1961	Liverpool	24	(2)
1961	Wigan Athletic		
1961–1966	Portsmouth	64	(2)
1966–1967	Aldershot	5	(0)
Total		93	(4)

Managerial career
- 1976–1980: Fulham
- 1982–1984: Portsmouth
- 1985–1986: Al Qadsia Kuwait
- 1988–1991: Chelsea
- 1993–1994: Al-Arabi Kuwait
- * Club domestic league appearances and goals

Robert George Campbell (23 April 1937 – 6 November 2015) was an English professional football player and later manager.

== Playing career ==
Campbell began his career with then-Second Division side Liverpool in 1958, making his debut against Sheffield United on 15 September. He won England Youth international caps during his three year stint at Anfield. Campbell left Liverpool in the summer of 1961, joining non-league side Wigan Athletic, before returning to the Football League by joining Third Division side Portsmouth in November, who went on the win the league that season. During his first two seasons at Portsmouth, his playing time was limited due to injuries, and was mostly playing for the reserve side. Campbell became a regular in Portsmouth's squad in his third season, when he played 30 games and scored twice.

Campbell joined Fourth Division side Aldershot in 1966, and retired shortly after due to injuries.

== Coaching and managerial career ==
After injury ended his career in 1966, he turned his hand to coaching. He returned to Portsmouth as an assistant-coach in 1967. He moved on to Queens Park Rangers in 1971, serving as the assistant to Gordon Jago. He helped the club achieve promotion from the Second Division in the 1972–73 season, finishing second in the league.

He went on to work under Bertie Mee at Arsenal as first-team coach, after Steve Burtenshaw's resignation and subsequent departure to Sheffield Wednesday in the summer of 1973.

Campbell joined Alec Stock's coaching team at Fulham in the summer of 1976, and when Stock was fired in December, Campbell was appointed the club's manager. After a couple years of underachievement and a disastrous relegation to the Third Division in 1979–80, Campbell was finally sacked in October 1980 when the team made a poor start to the 1980–81 season.

He returned to Portsmouth in March 1982 as a manager, whom he led to the Third Division title in 1982–83 after spending big on players such as Alan Biley and Neil Webb. However, he was sacked in May 1984 after Portsmouth only narrowly avoided being immediately relegated back to the Third Division.

Campbell then returned to Arsenal as assistant manager, then Queens Park Rangers for a stint as reserve team manager. He also had a stint with Kuwait side Qadsia SC before taking up reserve team manager position at Chelsea in the summer of 1987.

Towards the end of the 1987–88 season, Campbell was appointed assistant to manager John Hollins, with the team in the midst of a relegation battle; one month later Hollins was sacked and Campbell appointed caretaker manager until the end of the season. Campbell was unable to turn around the club's fortunes in the eight games which remained that season, and they were relegated via the short-lived play-off system.

He made amends the following season, however, as his side romped to promotion as Second Division champions with a haul of 99 points. A year later, he led to Chelsea to a 5th-place finish in the First Division, their highest league placing since 1970. He was relieved of his managerial duties after an 11th-place finish and appointed personal assistant to Chelsea chairman Ken Bates in 1991.

Campbell went on to coach in Kuwait where he managed the two biggest clubs in the country: Al-Arabi SC and Qadsia SC.

== Retirement ==
After his time in Kuwait he retired to Florida but later moved close to Chelsea's ground; he was described as being a member of Roman Abramovich's "inner circle", advising him on footballing affairs, often sitting next to Abramovich on match days and keeping an eye on up-and-coming talent by attending the club's academy games at the Cobham Training Centre.

== Death ==
He died on 6 November 2015. He was survived by his wife, Sue, and by their daughter and three sons.

== Honours ==
Chelsea

- Full Members' Cup: 1989–90

Portsmouth

- Football League Third Division: 1982–83
