= List of Chelsea F.C. seasons =

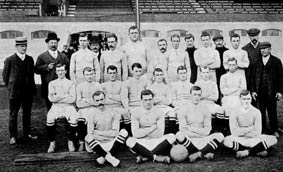
The first Chelsea team in September 1905

This is a list of all seasons played by Chelsea Football Club in English and European football, from their inaugural season in 1905–06 to their last completed season (2025–26). It details their record in every major competition entered, as well as the top goalscorers for each season. Top scorers in bold were also the top scorers in Chelsea's division that season.

Chelsea have won every major domestic and international honour, and have never been outside the top two divisions in English football. In total, the club have won six League Championships (the First Division and its successor, the Premier League), eight FA Cups, five League Cups, two UEFA Champions Leagues, two UEFA Europa Leagues, two UEFA Cup Winners' Cups, one UEFA Conference League, and two FIFA Club World Cups. In addition, Chelsea have also won various minor honours, including four FA Community/Charity Shields, two Full Members' Cups, and two UEFA Super Cups.

As of the end of the 2025–26 season, Chelsea have spent 91 seasons in the top division.

== Key ==
- Prem – Premier League
- Div 1 – Football League First Division
- Div 2 – Football League Second Division
- CS – FA Charity Shield / FA Community Shield
- UCL – European Cup / UEFA Champions League
- UEL – Inter-Cities Fairs Cup / UEFA Cup / UEFA Europa League
- UEC – UEFA Conference League
- CWC – European Cup Winners' Cup / UEFA Cup Winners' Cup
- USC – UEFA Super Cup
- FWC – FIFA Club World Cup
- FM – Full Members' Cup
- Pld – Matches played
- W – Matches won
- D – Matches drawn
- L – Matches lost
- GF – Goals for
- GA – Goals against
- Pts – Points
- Pos – Final position
- 1Q – First qualifying round
- 2Q – Second qualifying round
- 3Q – Third qualifying round
- PO – Play-off round
- R32 – Round of 32
- R16 – Round of 16
- R1 – Round 1
- R2 – Round 2
- R3 – Round 3
- R4 – Round 4
- R5 – Round 5
- R6 – Round 6
- QF – Quarter-finals
- SF – Semi-finals
- RU – Runners-up
- W – Winners
- w/d – Withdrew

Winners	Runners-up	Promoted ↑	Relegated ↓	Top scorer(s) in Chelsea's division

== Seasons ==
Results of league and cup competitions by season
Season	League									FA Cup	League Cup	Other competitions								Top goalscorer(s) (Note: Competitive matches only. Includes all goals scored in the Premier League, Football League, FA Cup, League Cup, Full Members' Cup, UEFA Champions League, UEFA Cup/Europa League, UEFA Conference League, UEFA Cup Winners' Cup, Inter-Cities Fairs Cup, UEFA Super Cup, FIFA Club World Cup, and Charity/Community Shield.)	
Season	Division	Pld	W	D	L	GF	GA	Pts	Pos	FA Cup	League Cup	CS	UCL	UEL	UEC	CWC	USC	FWC	FM	Player(s)	Goals
1905–06	Div 2	38	22	9	7	90	37	53	3rd	3Q										Frank Pearson Jimmy Windridge	18
1906–07	Div 2 ↑	38	26	5	7	80	34	57	2nd	R1										George Hilsdon	27
1907–08	Div 1	38	14	8	16	53	62	36	13th	R2										George Hilsdon	30
1908–09	Div 1	38	14	9	15	56	61	37	11th	R2										George Hilsdon	27
1909–10	Div 1 ↓	38	11	7	20	47	70	29	19th	R2										Jimmy Windridge	6
1910–11	Div 2	38	20	9	9	71	35	49	3rd	SF										Bob Whittingham	**34** (Note: 31 goals in the Second Division.)
1911–12	Div 2 ↑	38	24	6	8	64	34	54	2nd	R2										Bob Whittingham	26
1912–13	Div 1	38	11	6	21	51	73	28	18th	R2										Bob Whittingham	12
1913–14	Div 1	38	16	7	15	46	55	39	8th	R1										Harold Halse	10
1914–15	Div 1	38	8	13	17	51	65	29	19th (Note: Chelsea ended the 1914–15 season in a relegation position, but when the league was expanded after the First World War the club was invited to rejoin the First Division.)	RU										Bob Thomson	18
Competitive football was suspended during World War I. Chelsea played in the unofficial Football Combination until 1919.
1919–20	Div 1	42	22	5	15	56	51	49	3rd	SF										Jack Cock	24
1920–21	Div 1	42	13	13	16	48	58	38	18th	R4										Jack Cock	15
1921–22	Div 1	42	17	12	13	40	43	46	9th	R1										Jack Cock	13
1922–23	Div 1	42	9	18	15	45	53	36	19th	R2										Harry Ford Buchanan Sharp	10
1923–24	Div 1 ↓	42	9	14	19	31	53	32	21st	R1										Andy Wilson	6
1924–25	Div 2	42	16	15	11	51	37	47	5th	R1										William Whitton	16
1925–26	Div 2	42	19	14	9	76	49	52	3rd	R4										Bob Turnbull	30
1926–27	Div 2	42	20	12	10	62	52	52	4th	R6										Bob Turnbull	23
1927–28	Div 2	42	23	8	11	75	45	54	3rd	R3										James Thompson	25
1928–29	Div 2	42	17	10	15	64	65	44	9th	R5										George Biswell Jimmy Thompson Andy Wilson	9
1929–30	Div 2 ↑	42	22	11	9	74	46	55	2nd	R3										George Mills	14
1930–31	Div 1	42	15	10	17	64	67	40	12th	R6										Hughie Gallacher	14
1931–32	Div 1	42	16	8	18	69	73	40	12th	SF										Hughie Gallacher	30
1932–33	Div 1	42	14	7	21	63	73	35	18th	R3										Hughie Gallacher	19
1933–34	Div 1	42	14	8	20	67	69	36	19th	R5										Hughie Gallacher	16
1934–35	Div 1	42	16	9	17	73	82	41	12th	R3										Dick Spence	19
1935–36	Div 1	42	15	13	14	65	72	43	8th	R5										Joe Bambrick	19
1936–37	Div 1	42	14	13	15	52	55	41	13th	R4										George Mills	23
1937–38	Div 1	42	14	13	15	65	65	41	10th	R3										George Mills	13
1938–39	Div 1	42	12	9	21	64	80	33	20th	R6										Joe Payne	19
Competitive football was suspended during World War II. Chelsea played in the unofficial Wartime Leagues until 1945.
1945–46	The FA Cup was resumed in 1945–46 but the Football League did not resume for another season.									R5										Five players	1
1946–47	Div 1	42	16	7	19	69	84	39	15th	R4										Tommy Lawton	30
1947–48	Div 1	42	14	9	19	53	71	37	18th	R4										Ken Armstrong	13
1948–49	Div 1	42	12	14	16	69	68	38	13th	R5										Roy Bentley	22
1949–50	Div 1	42	12	16	14	58	65	40	13th	SF										Roy Bentley	22
1950–51	Div 1	42	12	8	22	53	65	32	20th	R5										Roy Bentley	11
1951–52	Div 1	42	14	8	20	52	72	36	19th	SF										Roy Bentley	17
1952–53	Div 1	42	12	11	19	56	66	35	19th	R5										Roy Bentley	17
1953–54	Div 1	42	16	12	14	74	68	44	8th	R3										Roy Bentley	21
1954–55	Div 1	42	20	12	10	81	57	52	**1st**	R5										Roy Bentley	21
1955–56	Div 1	42	14	11	17	64	77	39	16th	R5		**W**	w/d (Note: As English champions, Chelsea qualified for the inaugural European Champions' Cup, but withdrew under pressure from the Football League, whose chairman Alan Hardaker felt priority should be given to domestic competitions.)							Roy Bentley	16
1956–57	Div 1	42	13	13	16	73	73	39	13th	R4										Johnny McNichol	11
1957–58	Div 1	42	15	12	15	83	79	42	11th	R4										Jimmy Greaves	22
1958–59	Div 1	42	18	4	20	77	98	40	14th	R4				QF						Jimmy Greaves	**37** (Note: 33 goals in the First Division.)
1959–60	Div 1	42	14	9	19	76	91	37	18th	R4										Jimmy Greaves	30
1960–61	Div 1	42	15	7	20	98	100	37	12th	R3	R4									Jimmy Greaves	**43** (Note: 41 goals in the First Division.)
1961–62	Div 1 ↓	42	9	10	23	63	94	28	22nd	R3	w/d (Note: In the early years of the League Cup, some clubs opted not to participate. Chelsea withdrew from the competition in 1961–62, 1962–63 and 1965–66.)									Bobby Tambling	22
1962–63	Div 2 ↑	42	24	4	14	81	42	52	2nd	R5	w/d									Bobby Tambling	**37** (Note: 35 goals in the Second Division.)
1963–64	Div 1	42	20	10	12	72	56	50	5th	R4	R2									Bobby Tambling	19
1964–65	Div 1	42	24	8	10	89	54	56	3rd	SF	**W**									Barry Bridges	27
1965–66	Div 1	42	22	7	13	65	53	51	5th	SF	w/d			SF						George Graham Bobby Tambling	23
1966–67	Div 1	42	15	14	13	67	62	44	9th	RU	R3									Bobby Tambling	28
1967–68	Div 1	42	18	12	12	62	68	48	6th	R6	R2									Peter Osgood	17
1968–69	Div 1	42	20	10	12	73	53	50	5th	R6	R3			R2						Bobby Tambling	19
1969–70	Div 1	42	21	13	8	70	50	55	3rd	**W**	R4									Peter Osgood	31
1970–71	Div 1	42	18	15	9	52	42	51	6th	R4	R4	RU				**W**				Keith Weller	14
1971–72	Div 1	42	18	12	12	58	49	48	7th	R5	RU					R2				Peter Osgood	31
1972–73	Div 1	42	13	14	15	49	51	40	12th	R6	SF									Peter Osgood	17
1973–74	Div 1	42	12	13	17	56	60	37	17th	R3	R2									Tommy Baldwin	9
1974–75	Div 1 ↓	42	9	15	18	42	72	33	21st	R4	R3									Ian Hutchinson	9
1975–76	Div 2	42	12	16	14	53	54	40	11th	R5	R2									Ray Wilkins	12
1976–77	Div 2 ↑	42	21	13	8	73	53	55	2nd	R3	R4									Steve Finnieston	26
1977–78	Div 1	42	11	14	17	46	69	36	16th	R5	R2									Tommy Langley	13
1978–79	Div 1 ↓	42	5	10	27	44	92	20	22nd	R3	R2									Tommy Langley	16
1979–80	Div 2	42	23	7	12	66	52	53	4th	R3	R2									Mike Fillery Clive Walker	13
1980–81	Div 2	42	14	12	16	46	41	40	12th	R3	R2									Colin Lee	16
1981–82	Div 2	42	15	12	15	60	60	57	12th	R6	R3									Clive Walker	17
1982–83	Div 2	42	11	14	17	51	61	47	18th	R4	R3									Mike Fillery	12
1983–84	Div 2 ↑	42	25	13	4	90	40	88	**1st**	R3	R3									Kerry Dixon	**34** (Note: 28 goals in the Second Division.)
1984–85	Div 1	42	18	12	12	63	48	66	6th	R4	SF									Kerry Dixon	**36** (Note: 24 goals in the First Division; joint top scorer alongside Gary Lineker (Leicester City).)
1985–86	Div 1	42	20	11	11	57	56	71	6th	R4	R5								**W**	Kerry Dixon	23
1986–87	Div 1	42	13	13	16	53	64	52	14th	R4	R3								QF	Kerry Dixon	12
1987–88	Div 1 ↓	40	9	15	16	50	68	42	18th (Note: Chelsea were relegated after losing a two-legged play-off against Middlesbrough.)	R4	R2								R3	Gordon Durie	20
1988–89	Div 2 ↑	46	29	12	5	96	50	99	**1st**	R3	R2								R3	Kerry Dixon	28
1989–90	Div 1	38	16	12	10	58	50	60	5th	R4	R2								**W**	Kerry Dixon	25
1990–91	Div 1	38	13	10	15	58	69	49	11th	R3	SF								R3	Kerry Dixon Gordon Durie	15
1991–92	Div 1	42	13	14	15	50	60	53	14th	R6	R2								SF	Dennis Wise	14
1992–93	Prem	42	14	14	14	51	54	56	11th	R3	R5									Mick Harford	11
1993–94	Prem	42	13	12	17	49	53	51	14th	RU	R3									Gavin Peacock Mark Stein	14
1994–95	Prem	42	13	15	14	50	55	54	11th	R4	R3					SF				Paul Furlong John Spencer	13
1995–96	Prem	38	12	14	12	46	44	50	11th	SF	R2									John Spencer	14
1996–97	Prem	38	16	11	11	58	55	59	6th	**W**	R3									Mark Hughes	14
1997–98	Prem	38	20	3	15	71	43	63	4th	R3	**W**	RU				**W**				Gianluca Vialli	19
1998–99	Prem	38	20	15	3	57	30	75	3rd	R6	R5					SF	**W**			Gianfranco Zola	15
1999–2000	Prem	38	18	11	9	53	34	65	5th	**W**	R3		QF							Tore André Flo	19
2000–01	Prem	38	17	10	11	68	45	61	6th	R5	R3	**W**		R1						Jimmy Floyd Hasselbaink	**26** (Note: 23 goals in the Premier League.)
2001–02	Prem	38	17	13	8	66	38	64	6th	RU	SF			R2						Jimmy Floyd Hasselbaink	29
2002–03	Prem	38	19	10	9	68	38	67	4th	R6	R5			R1						Gianfranco Zola	16
2003–04	Prem	38	24	7	7	67	30	79	2nd	R5	R5		SF							Jimmy Floyd Hasselbaink	17
2004–05	Prem	38	29	8	1	72	15	95	**1st**	R5	**W**		SF							Frank Lampard	19
2005–06	Prem	38	29	4	5	72	22	91	**1st**	SF	R3	**W**	R16							Frank Lampard	20
2006–07	Prem	38	24	11	3	64	24	83	2nd	**W**	**W**	RU	SF							Didier Drogba	**33** (Note: 20 goals in the Premier League.)
2007–08	Prem	38	25	10	3	65	26	85	2nd	R6	RU	RU	RU							Frank Lampard	20
2008–09	Prem	38	25	8	5	68	24	83	3rd	**W**	R4		SF							Nicolas Anelka	**25** (Note: 19 goals in the Premier League.)
2009–10	Prem	38	27	5	6	103	32	86	**1st**	**W**	R5	**W**	R16							Didier Drogba	**37** (Note: 29 goals in the Premier League.)
2010–11	Prem	38	21	8	9	69	33	71	2nd	R4	R3	RU	QF							Nicolas Anelka	16
2011–12	Prem	38	18	10	10	65	46	64	6th	**W**	R5		**W**							Frank Lampard	16
2012–13	Prem	38	22	9	7	75	39	75	3rd	SF	SF	RU	GS	**W**			RU	RU		Fernando Torres	22
2013–14	Prem	38	25	7	6	71	27	82	3rd	R5	R5		SF				RU			Eden Hazard	17
2014–15	Prem	38	26	9	3	73	32	87	**1st**	R4	**W**		R16							Diego Costa	21
2015–16	Prem	38	12	14	12	59	53	50	10th	R6	R4	RU	R16							Diego Costa	16
2016–17	Prem	38	30	3	5	85	33	93	**1st**	RU	R4									Diego Costa	22
2017–18	Prem	38	21	7	10	62	38	70	5th	**W**	SF	RU	R16							Eden Hazard	17
2018–19	Prem	38	21	9	8	63	39	72	3rd	R5	RU	RU		**W**						Eden Hazard	21
2019–20	Prem	38	20	6	12	69	54	66	4th	RU	R4		R16				RU			Tammy Abraham	18
2020–21	Prem	38	19	10	9	58	36	67	4th	RU	R4		**W**							Tammy Abraham Timo Werner	12
2021–22	Prem	38	21	11	6	76	33	74	3rd	RU	RU		QF				**W**	**W**		Romelu Lukaku	15
2022–23	Prem	38	11	11	16	38	47	44	12th	R3	R3		QF							Kai Havertz Raheem Sterling	9
2023–24	Prem	38	18	9	11	77	63	63	6th	SF	RU									Cole Palmer	25
2024–25	Prem	38	20	9	9	64	43	69	4th	R4	R4				**W**			**W**		Cole Palmer	18
2025–26	Prem	38	14	10	14	58	52	52	10th	RU	SF		R16							João Pedro	20
