= 1917–18 Chelsea F.C. season =

English football club season

Chelsea
1917–18 season
- Chairman: Claude Kirby
- Manager: David Calderhead
- Stadium: Stamford Bridge
- London Combination: 1st
- War Fund Cup: Winners
- Top goalscorer: League: All: Bob Thomson (25)
- Biggest win: 7–0 v Fulham (30 March 1918)
- Biggest defeat: 1–4 v Arsenal (19 January 1918)
Home colours	Away colours

The 1917–18 season was Chelsea Football Club's twelfth year in existence. Due to the ongoing First World War, the Football League and the FA Cup were suspended so the club instead participated in the London Combination, an unofficial regional league mainly comprising teams from London. Results and statistics from these matches are not considered official. Chelsea won the London Combination for the second time in three years as well as the War Fund Cup.

Former Chelsea player George Kennedy, who was awarded both the Military Medal and Distinguished Conduct Medal for gallantry during the conflict, was wounded during the Third Battle of Ypres and subsequently died from his injuries on 16 November 1917. On 28 April 1918, Arthur Wileman, member of the Football Battalion, was killed along with two others during a reconnaissance patrol in the vicinity of the Elzenwalle Chateau, Ypres, West Flanders on 28 April 1918. His name is inscribed on the Tyne Cot Memorial to the Missing.
