= 1916–17 Chelsea F.C. season =

English football club season

Chelsea
1916–17 season
- Chairman: Claude Kirby
- Manager: David Calderhead
- Stadium: Stamford Bridge
- London Combination: 3rd
- Top goalscorer: League: All: Bob Thomson (27)
- Biggest win: 6–0 v Reading (14 October 1916)
- Biggest defeat: 1–4 v Luton Town (30 December 1916)
Home colours	Away colours

The 1916–17 season was Chelsea Football Club's eleventh year in existence. Due to the ongoing First World War, the Football League and the FA Cup were suspended so the club instead participated in the London Combination, an unofficial regional league mainly comprising teams from London. Results and statistics from these matches are not considered official. Chelsea finished 3rd in the league.

Bob Whiting, a goalkeeper who played for Chelsea from 1906 to 1908, was killed in action whilst assaulting a fortified German position at Oppy Wood during the Battle of Arras on 28 April 1917 and is commemorated on the Arras Memorial. In April 1917, former Chelsea striker George Hilsdon was wounded in a mustard gas attack at Arras, though he survived.
