= 1914–15 Chelsea F.C. season =

English football club season

Chelsea
1914–15 season
- Chairman: Claude Kirby
- Manager: David Calderhead
- Stadium: Stamford Bridge
- First Division: 19th
- FA Cup: Runners-up
- Top goalscorer: League: Bob Thomson (12); All: Bob Thomson (18)
- Highest home attendance: 58,760 vs Newcastle United (6 March 1915)
- Lowest home attendance: 14,000 vs Newcastle United (12 September 1914)
- Average home league attendance: 20,237
- Biggest win: 5–2 v Swindon Town (16 January 1915)
- Biggest defeat: 1–4 v Burnley (28 December 1914)
| Home colours | Away colours |

The 1914–15 season was Chelsea Football Club's tenth competitive season. It was also the final full season before competitive football was suspended until the end of World War I. The season was one of mixed fortunes for the club: they finished 19th in the First Division, but also reached the FA Cup final for the first time, where they lost to Sheffield United.

Having finished 19th, Chelsea would ordinarily have been relegated, but the First Division expanded to 22 teams when competitive football resumed in 1919, and the club were re-elected into the division. A factor in the decision was the exposure of a match-fixing scandal involving Manchester United and Liverpool players, who had colluded to ensure a 2–0 win for a United in an April 1915 fixture, a result which meant United avoided relegation at Chelsea's expense.

== Table ==
| Pos | Team | Pld | W | D | L | GF | GA | GAv | Pts | Relegation |
|---|---|---|---|---|---|---|---|---|---|---|
| 1 | Everton (C) | 38 | 19 | 8 | 11 | 76 | 47 | 1.617 | 46 | |
| 2 | Oldham Athletic | 38 | 17 | 11 | 10 | 70 | 56 | 1.250 | 45 | |
| 3 | Blackburn Rovers | 38 | 18 | 7 | 13 | 83 | 61 | 1.361 | 43 | |
| 4 | Burnley | 38 | 18 | 7 | 13 | 61 | 47 | 1.298 | 43 | |
| 5 | Manchester City | 38 | 15 | 13 | 10 | 49 | 39 | 1.256 | 43 | |
| 6 | Sheffield United | 38 | 15 | 13 | 10 | 49 | 41 | 1.195 | 43 | |
| 7 | The Wednesday | 38 | 15 | 13 | 10 | 61 | 54 | 1.130 | 43 | |
| 8 | Sunderland | 38 | 18 | 5 | 15 | 81 | 72 | 1.125 | 41 | |
| 9 | Bradford (Park Avenue) | 38 | 17 | 7 | 14 | 69 | 65 | 1.062 | 41 | |
| 10 | West Bromwich Albion | 38 | 15 | 10 | 13 | 49 | 43 | 1.140 | 40 | |
| 11 | Bradford City | 38 | 13 | 14 | 11 | 55 | 49 | 1.122 | 40 | |
| 12 | Middlesbrough | 38 | 13 | 12 | 13 | 62 | 74 | 0.838 | 38 | |
| 13 | Liverpool | 38 | 14 | 9 | 15 | 65 | 75 | 0.867 | 37 | |
| 14 | Aston Villa | 38 | 13 | 11 | 14 | 62 | 72 | 0.861 | 37 | |
| 15 | Newcastle United | 38 | 11 | 10 | 17 | 46 | 48 | 0.958 | 32 | |
| 16 | Notts County | 38 | 9 | 13 | 16 | 41 | 57 | 0.719 | 31 | |
| 17 | Bolton Wanderers | 38 | 11 | 8 | 19 | 68 | 84 | 0.810 | 30 | |
| 18 | Manchester United | 38 | 9 | 12 | 17 | 46 | 62 | 0.742 | 30 | |
| 19 | Chelsea | 38 | 8 | 13 | 17 | 51 | 65 | 0.785 | 29 | |
| 20 | Tottenham Hotspur (R) | 38 | 8 | 12 | 18 | 57 | 90 | 0.633 | 28 | Relegation to the Second Division |

Source: World Football
Rules for classification: 1) Points; 2) Goal average; 3) Goals scored
(C) Champions; (R) Relegated
