= Chelsea F.C.–Liverpool F.C. rivalry =

English football club rivalry

Chelsea v Liverpool
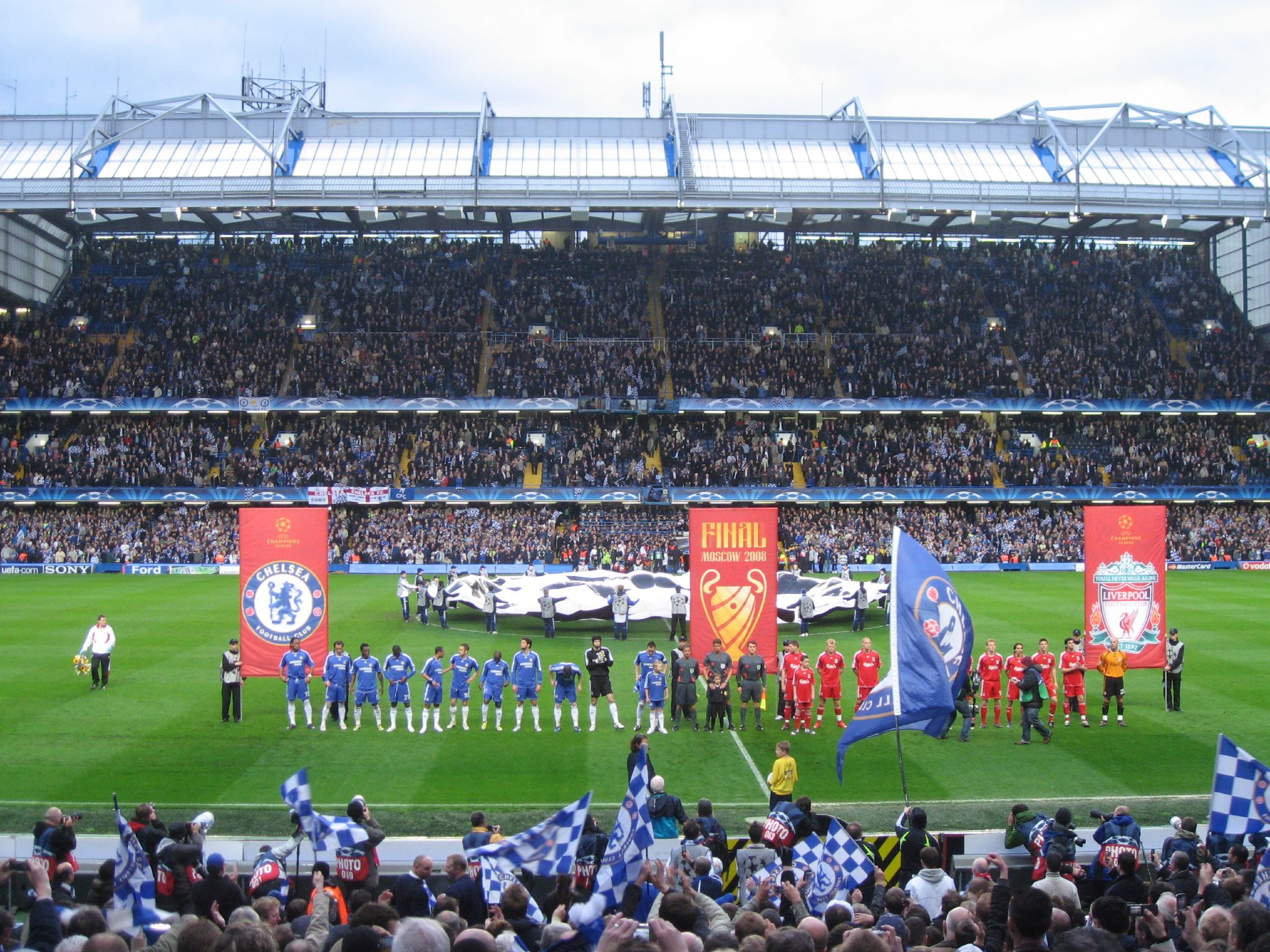
- Chelsea and Liverpool players walk out on to the field at Stamford Bridge ahead of their Champions League tie in April 2008.
- Location: London; Liverpool
- Teams: Chelsea; Liverpool
- First meeting: 25 December 1907; First Division; Liverpool 1–4 Chelsea
- Latest meeting: 28 October 2026; EFL Cup; Liverpool 1–1 (6–5 p) Chelsea
- Next meeting: 5 December 2026; Premier League; Chelsea v Liverpool
- Stadiums: Stamford Bridge (Chelsea); Anfield (Liverpool)

Statistics
- Total meetings: 202
- Most player appearances: Jamie Carragher (45)
- Top scorer: Ian Rush (10)
- All-time series: Chelsea: 67; Drawn: 51; Liverpool: 84
- Largest victory: Liverpool 6–0 Chelsea; First Division (20 April 1935)
- Largest goal scoring: Liverpool 7–4 Chelsea; First Division (7 September 1946)
- Longest win streak: 5 games Liverpool (1972–1974)
- Longest unbeaten streak: 11 games Liverpool (1985–1990)
- Current unbeaten streak: 4 matches Chelsea (2025–present)

The Chelsea F.C.–Liverpool F.C. rivalry is a rivalry between English professional football clubs Chelsea and Liverpool. Chelsea play their home games at Stamford Bridge, while Liverpool play their home games at Anfield.

Though both clubs have frequently competed in the same division for over a century, the modern rivalry between Chelsea and Liverpool began in the early 2000s, when the two clubs clashed repeatedly in cup competitions, particularly in the FA Cup, the League Cup, and the UEFA Champions League. The clubs have competed in seven major cup finals: the 2005 League Cup final, which Chelsea won 3–2 after extra time, the 2006 Community Shield, which Liverpool won 2–1, the 2012 FA Cup final, which Chelsea won 2–1, the 2019 UEFA Super Cup, which Liverpool won 5–4 on penalties, the 2022 EFL Cup and FA Cup finals, both of which saw Liverpool win on penalties after two goalless affairs, and the 2024 EFL Cup final, which Liverpool won 1–0 after extra time. The two clubs also met in five consecutive Champions League campaigns; in the group stage of the 2005–06 season, where both legs finished as goalless draws, in the quarter-finals of the 2008–09 season, which Chelsea won 7–5 on aggregate, and in the semi-finals of the 2004–05, 2006–07 and 2007–08 seasons, with Liverpool winning the former two and Chelsea winning the latter one.

Overall, Liverpool have won more of the meetings, defeating Chelsea 84 times to their 67 wins, and a further 51 games ended in draws, as of their latest clash in October 2026. Chelsea's record win over the Reds was a 6–1 win at Stamford Bridge in August 1937, whereas Liverpool's biggest win was a 6–0 home win in April 1935.

== Background ==
=== Chelsea ===
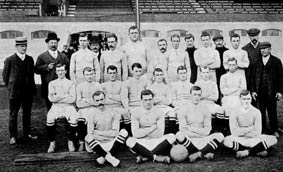
The first Chelsea team in September 1905

In 1904, Gus Mears acquired the Stamford Bridge athletics stadium in Fulham with the aim of turning it into a football ground. An offer to lease it to nearby Fulham F.C. was turned down, so Mears opted to found his own club to use the stadium. As there was already a team named Fulham in the borough, the name of the adjacent borough of Chelsea was chosen for the new club; names like Kensington FC, Stamford Bridge FC and London FC were also considered. Chelsea Football Club was founded on 10 March 1905 at The Rising Sun pub (now The Butcher's Hook), opposite the present-day main entrance to the ground on Fulham Road, and were elected to the Football League shortly afterwards.

Chelsea won promotion to the First Division in their second season, and yo-yoed between the First and Second Divisions in its early years. The team reached the 1915 FA Cup final, where they lost to Sheffield United at Old Trafford, and finished third in the First Division in 1920, the club's best league campaign to that point. Chelsea had a reputation for signing star players and attracted large crowds. The club had the highest average attendance in English football in ten separate seasons including 1907–08, 1909–10, 1911–12, 1912–13, 1913–14 and 1919–20. They were FA Cup semi-finalists in 1920 and 1932, and remained in the First Division throughout the 1930s, but success eluded the club in the inter-war years.

=== Liverpool ===
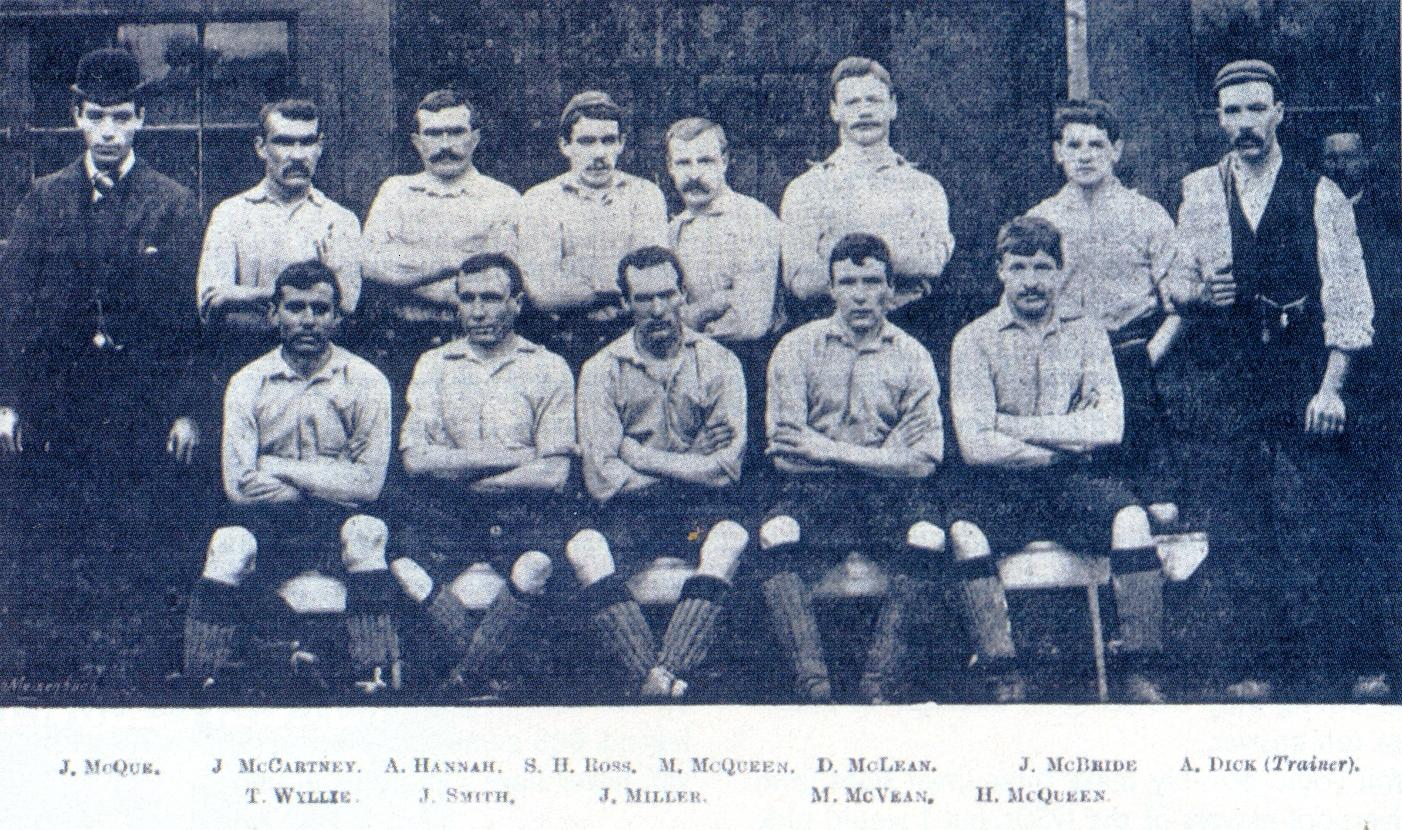
Liverpool's team during their first season, 1892–93

Liverpool Football Club was founded following a dispute between the Everton committee and John Houlding, club president and owner of the land at Anfield. After eight years at the stadium, Everton relocated to Goodison Park in 1892 and Houlding founded Liverpool F.C. to play at Anfield. Originally named "Everton F.C. and Athletic Grounds Ltd" (Everton Athletic for short), the club became Liverpool F.C. in March 1892 and gained official recognition three months later, after The Football Association refused to recognise the club as Everton.

Liverpool played their first match on 1 September 1892, a pre-season friendly match against Rotherham Town, which they won 7–1. The team Liverpool fielded against Rotherham was composed entirely of Scottish players—the players who came from Scotland to play in England in those days were known as the Scotch Professors. Manager John McKenna had recruited the players after a scouting trip to Scotland—so they became known as the "team of Macs". The team won the Lancashire League in its debut season and joined the Football League Second Division at the start of the 1893–94 season. After the club was promoted to the First Division in 1896, Tom Watson was appointed manager. He led Liverpool to its first league title in 1901, before winning it again in 1906.

== History ==
=== Competitive matches and Liverpool success (1907–2002) ===
Chelsea and Liverpool were not traditional rivals, meeting first for the first time on 25 December 1907 at Anfield in the Football League First Division, which ended in a 4–1 win for Chelsea. However, for the next 96 years, Chelsea would only manage one single league title, which came in 1955, whereas Liverpool (who were already two-time champions) would go on to win the First Division title sixteen more times, cementing the Reds' status as one of the biggest clubs in England and in Europe, along with major rivals Manchester United, whereas Chelsea were considered to be a mid-table club, and their rivalry with Liverpool was non-existent during the years leading up to the 21st century.

=== Abramovich takeover and rivalry beginnings (2003–04) ===
We were the new kids on the block who had a few quid and signed a load of players. José Mourinho puffed his chest out and then we kept playing each other. It was a clash of two ideals.

— Frank Lampard on Chelsea's sudden rise to success

The seeds of the Chelsea vs. Liverpool rivalry were beginning to be sowed in May 2003. The first major meeting that would spark this feud was on the final day of the 2002–03 Premier League season, where fourth-placed Chelsea were to play fifth-placed Liverpool at Stamford Bridge in a clash for UEFA Champions League football. Both teams were level on 64 points, with the Blues having a +8 superior goal difference. The three teams that were above them, Manchester United in 1st, Arsenal in 2nd and Newcastle United in 3rd had already accumulated enough points to qualify for next season's Champions League, and sixth-placed Blackburn Rovers were unable to qualify, meaning Liverpool had to defeat Chelsea otherwise they would miss out on Champions League football next season. A goal from Sami Hyypiä in the 11th minute put the Reds 1–0 up, but Chelsea equalised just two minutes later through Marcel Desailly. Fourteen minutes later, Chelsea found themselves ahead via a Jesper Grønkjær strike. Steven Gerrard was dismissed two minutes from full-time, as Chelsea won 2–1 and ensured their place in the Champions League next season, with Liverpool having to settle for UEFA Cup (now Europa League) football instead.

In July 2003, long-time chairman of Chelsea Ken Bates sold the club to Russian billionaire Roman Abramovich for £140,000,000. Chelsea spent £103,000,000 on transfers in the summer of 2003, which included the signings of Joe Cole from West Ham United and Hernán Crespo from Inter Milan. Unlike the previous years, Chelsea under Abramovich had now become serious title contenders, threatening the likes of Manchester United and Arsenal, who combined had won ten of the first eleven Premier League titles.

The first meeting between Chelsea and Liverpool after the Abramovich takeover was on the first matchday of the new campaign, at Anfield. Chelsea won 2–1, courtesy of goals from Juan Sebastián Verón and Jimmy Floyd Hasselbaink. Liverpool would get revenge in the reverse fixture at Stamford Bridge in January 2004, which saw Bruno Cheyrou condemn Chelsea to a 1–0 home defeat. However, despite the mass spend of Chelsea, they would still be unable to win the league, finishing as runners-up to the undefeated Arsenal. Meanwhile, Liverpool finished in fourth place, nineteen points behind Chelsea, but still qualifying for the Champions League.

=== Mourinho vs. Benítez (2004–07) ===
In the summer of 2004, Chelsea and Liverpool had respectively appointed managers José Mourinho and Rafael Benítez, which was the beginning of a vicious rivalry between the pair. In their first season as rivals, they clashed five times, including two Premier League victories for Mourinho, both of which finished 1–0 to Chelsea and both of those goals being scored by Joe Cole. In the year 2005 alone, Chelsea and Liverpool met seven times.

==== 2005 League Cup final ====
On 27 February 2005, Liverpool faced Chelsea in the final of the Football League Cup. This was Liverpool's tenth appearance in a Football League Cup final, having won seven of them (1981, 1982, 1983, 1984, 1995, 2001, 2003) and losing twice (1978, 1987). For Chelsea, this was their fourth appearance in the final, winning the cup final in 1965 and 1998, and losing in 1972. Liverpool had defeated Millwall, Middlesbrough, Tottenham Hotspur and Watford en route to the final, whereas Chelsea got past West Ham United, Newcastle United, West London rivals Fulham and Manchester United.

A crowd of 78,000 at the Millennium Stadium in Cardiff saw John Arne Riise score a volley inside the first minute to put Liverpool ahead. The score remained 1-0 to the Reds for 79 minutes, until Steven Gerrard headed into his own net from a Chelsea free kick to give the Blues a lifeline. José Mourinho was also made to watch from the stands after making a gesture to the Liverpool fans. The score was 1–1 at full-time, taking the game to extra-time. Goals from Didier Drogba and Mateja Kežman put Chelsea 3–1 up. A goal from Antonio Núñez a minute later reduced the deficit for Liverpool, but the Blues would triumph 3–2 and win the League Cup for the third time.

Following the match, Mourinho defended the gesture that saw him dismissed, claiming that it had been intended for the media and not Liverpool fans: "The signal of close your mouth was not for them but for the press, they speak too much and in my opinion they try to do everything to disturb Chelsea. Wait, don't speak too soon. We lost two matches and in my opinion you (the media) try to take confidence from us and put pressure on us." Mourinho was happy that Chelsea had won, but said the victory was not special: "It's just one more. I had a few before this, I'm very happy to win. It's important for the fans, for the club and especially for the players."

==== Luis García "ghost goal" ====
Just two months after the League Cup final, the two clubs met yet again in the semi-finals of the Champions League. The first leg at Stamford Bridge ended in a goalless stalemate, however, in the second leg at Anfield, Liverpool controversially won 1–0, thanks to a goal scored by Luis García, which despite Chelsea's attempts to clear the ball off the line, the goal was given. It was dubbed as a "ghost goal" by José Mourinho, which popularised the term for other future incidents. This would seal Liverpool's place in the Champions League final, where they would take on AC Milan, famously coming back from 3–0 down and winning the Champions League on penalties.

Prior to the match, Chelsea were in hot pursuit of Steven Gerrard. Liverpool had rejected a £32,000,000 bid from Chelsea, however, in a shocking turn of events, Gerrard had rejected a £100,000-a-week contract offer and had submitted a transfer request, just six weeks after inspiring the comeback to help Liverpool win their fifth Champions League. He eventually changed his mind, soon after signing a new four-year deal and later stating that he would rather win one Premier League title at Liverpool than multiple at Chelsea, as it would mean more to him. Chelsea's failed signing of Liverpool's elite poster boy resulted in yet more bad blood developing between the two sets of supporters.

As for the Premier League season, Chelsea were runaway winners, winning their first Premier League title (second overall), finishing twelve points clear of second-placed Arsenal. They amassed a then record-setting 95 points, also winning 29 games, a record Chelsea themselves broke in 2016-17 with 30 wins (both broken by Manchester City in 2017–18) and conceding 15 goals, a record that still stands to this day as the best defensive record in Premier League history. Liverpool, meanwhile, finished fifth (a regression from the previous season), behind their Merseyside derby rivals Everton, who finished fourth, and 37 points behind Chelsea. However, this also meant that despite being the winners of the 2004–05 Champions League, they were not guaranteed a place in next season's edition, as they had finished outside of the top four of the Premier League. On 10 June 2005, UEFA decided to grant Liverpool special dispensation to defend their title, however, they would have to enter in the first qualifying round, and were denied country protection, which meant they could face any English team at any stage of the competition.

Liverpool would go on to defeat The New Saints, FBK Kaunas and CSKA Sofia in the Champions League first, second and third qualifying rounds, respectively, to advance to the group stage, where they were drawn in Group G, along with Chelsea, Anderlecht, and Real Betis, although both of their matches against Chelsea were 0–0 draws. Liverpool would finish top of the group with 12 points, with Chelsea finishing second, just behind the Reds with 11. Mourinho's Chelsea would manage to get the better of Liverpool in their Premier League clashes, defeating them 4–1 away at Anfield in October 2005, which made them the first Premier League opposition team to score four goals at Anfield (Note: This feat was later replicated by Arsenal in 2009 and Manchester City in 2021.) and also beating them 2–0 at Stamford Bridge in February 2006. However, Benítez's Liverpool were victorious in their semi-final encounter in the FA Cup, winning 2–1, ending Chelsea's hopes for their first ever double and progressing to the FA Cup final, where Steven Gerrard would score an equaliser in added time to help Liverpool defeat West Ham United 3–1 on penalties, in what became known as The Gerrard Final. After the match, Mourinho refused to shake Benítez's hand and claimed that the best team had lost, pointing to his side's superior league position, stating: "Did the best team win? I don't think so. In a one-off game, maybe they will surprise me and they can do it. In the Premiership, the distance between the teams is 45 points over two seasons."

Chelsea would win the Premier League for a second consecutive season, finishing on 91 points, whereas Liverpool, who were also title contenders throughout the season as well, finished third on 82 points, a point behind second-placed Manchester United, and 9 points behind Chelsea.

==== 2006 Community Shield ====
As Chelsea and Liverpool were the respective winners of the 2005–06 Premier League and the 2005–06 FA Cup, this meant that they would be playing each other in the 2006 FA Community Shield on 13 August 2006, at the Millennium Stadium in Cardiff, the same venue that hosted the 2005 Football League Cup final a year and a half prior, which saw Chelsea beat Liverpool 3–2. Chelsea were also the defending champions, having beaten their London rivals Arsenal the previous year. The Blues were making their sixth appearance in the Community Shield, having previously won in 1955 and 2000, and losing in 1970 and 1997. Liverpool, on the other hand, were appearing for the 21st time, emerging outright victorious eight times (1966, 1976, 1979, 1980, 1982, 1988, 1989, 2001), sharing the shield six times (1964, 1965, 1974, 1977, 1986, 1990) and losing it six times (1922, 1971, 1983, 1984, 1992, 2002). In the match, John Arne Riise opened the scoring for Liverpool early in the first half, only for Chelsea's recently signed forward Andriy Shevchenko to equalise shortly before half-time. Both sides had chances to win the match in the second half, but a Peter Crouch goal late in the half ensured Liverpool won the match 2–1, and won their 15th Community Shield.

=== Repeated Champions League ties (2007–09) ===
The two teams were again drawn against each other in the Champions League, squaring off in the semi-finals of the competition. Chelsea would win the first leg at Stamford Bridge 1–0 courtesy of a goal from Joe Cole, but Liverpool won the second leg 1–0 as well at Anfield, with Daniel Agger ensuring the tie finished 1–1 on aggregate. The team that would progress was decided in a penalty shoot-out. Liverpool would win the penalty shoot-out 4–1, sending them to their second Champions League final in three years, which would be a rematch of the 2005 edition, which saw AC Milan get their revenge on Liverpool and defeat them 2–1.

I'll be honest. I couldn't stand Chelsea as a club. It surpassed Everton and Manchester United as our rivalry for a period.

— Jamie Carragher on the rivalry between the two clubs and his dislike for Chelsea

The following season saw José Mourinho depart Chelsea in September 2007 by mutual consent, and would replaced by Avram Grant, but they would still defeat Liverpool 2–0 in the quarter-finals of the League Cup, with goals from Frank Lampard and Andriy Shevchenko sending the Reds crashing out of the competition. Chelsea and Liverpool were drawn against each other yet again in the semi-finals of the Champions League. In the first leg at Anfield, a Dirk Kuyt goal two minutes before half-time put Liverpool ahead, and the scoreline would remain unchanged until the 95th minute, which saw John Arne Riise scored own goal to give Chelsea an advantage, with the match finishing 1–1 and the Blues heading into the second leg at Stamford Bridge with a crucial away goal. Chelsea would defeat Liverpool 3–2, with a brace from Didier Drogba and an emotional penalty from Frank Lampard seeing Chelsea finally get the better of Liverpool in the Champions League, and sending them to their first ever Champions League final, which they would go on to lose 6–5 on penalties to Manchester United.

==== Liverpool end Chelsea's home unbeaten run ====
2008–09 Premier League table before Chelsea vs. Liverpool
| Pos | Team | Pld | W | D | L | GF | GA | GD | Pts | Qualification |
|---|---|---|---|---|---|---|---|---|---|---|
| 1 | Chelsea | 8 | 6 | 2 | 0 | 19 | 3 | +16 | 20 | Qualification for the Champions League group stage |
| 2 | Liverpool | 8 | 6 | 2 | 0 | 13 | 6 | +7 | 20 | Qualification for the Champions League group stage |
| 3 | Hull City | 9 | 6 | 2 | 1 | 14 | 11 | +3 | 20 | Qualification for the Champions League group stage |
| 4 | Arsenal | 8 | 5 | 1 | 2 | 16 | 6 | +10 | 16 | Qualification for the Champions League play-off round |
| 5 | Manchester United | 8 | 4 | 3 | 1 | 13 | 5 | +8 | 15 | Qualification for the Europa League play-off round |

On 26 October 2008, Chelsea hosted Liverpool at Stamford Bridge in the ninth gameweek of the new Premier League campaign. At this point, Chelsea were top of the Premier League, and Liverpool were second, with both teams having 20 points and Chelsea having a +9 superior goal difference. Chelsea hadn't lost a home match in the Premier League in over four and a half years, last losing at Stamford Bridge to Arsenal in February 2004, and were looking to extend their lead at the top of the table and their home unbeaten run to 87 games. In surprising fashion, however, Liverpool would defeat Chelsea 1–0, with a 10th-minute strike from Xabi Alonso that deflected off Chelsea defender José Bosingwa sending the Reds to the top of the Premier League and ending the Blues' record-setting 86-game home unbeaten run, their first home league defeat in over four years, which is still the record for the most home games unbeaten in the Premier League. In the reverse fixture at Anfield in February 2009, Liverpool defeated Chelsea again, this time winning 2–0, with both goals coming from Fernando Torres late in the game. This was the first season in Premier League history that Liverpool had completed a Premier League double over Chelsea. They would also finish second, above Chelsea who finished third, making it the first Premier League season since 2001–02 where Liverpool finished above Chelsea in the Premier League table.

In the quarter finals of the Champions League, Liverpool and Chelsea were drawn against each other again, marking the fifth consecutive season in which they played together in the Champions League, the most in Champions League history. In the first leg at Anfield, Chelsea emphatically won 3–1, with two goals from defender Branislav Ivanović and a goal from Didier Drogba giving Chelsea an advantage in the second leg at Stamford Bridge, which saw both teams play out a thrilling 4–4 draw, with Chelsea winning 7–5 on aggregate and progressing to the semi-finals of the Champions League. From 2004 to 2009, Chelsea and Liverpool met a staggering 24 times.

=== Fernando Torres signs for Chelsea (2010–12) ===
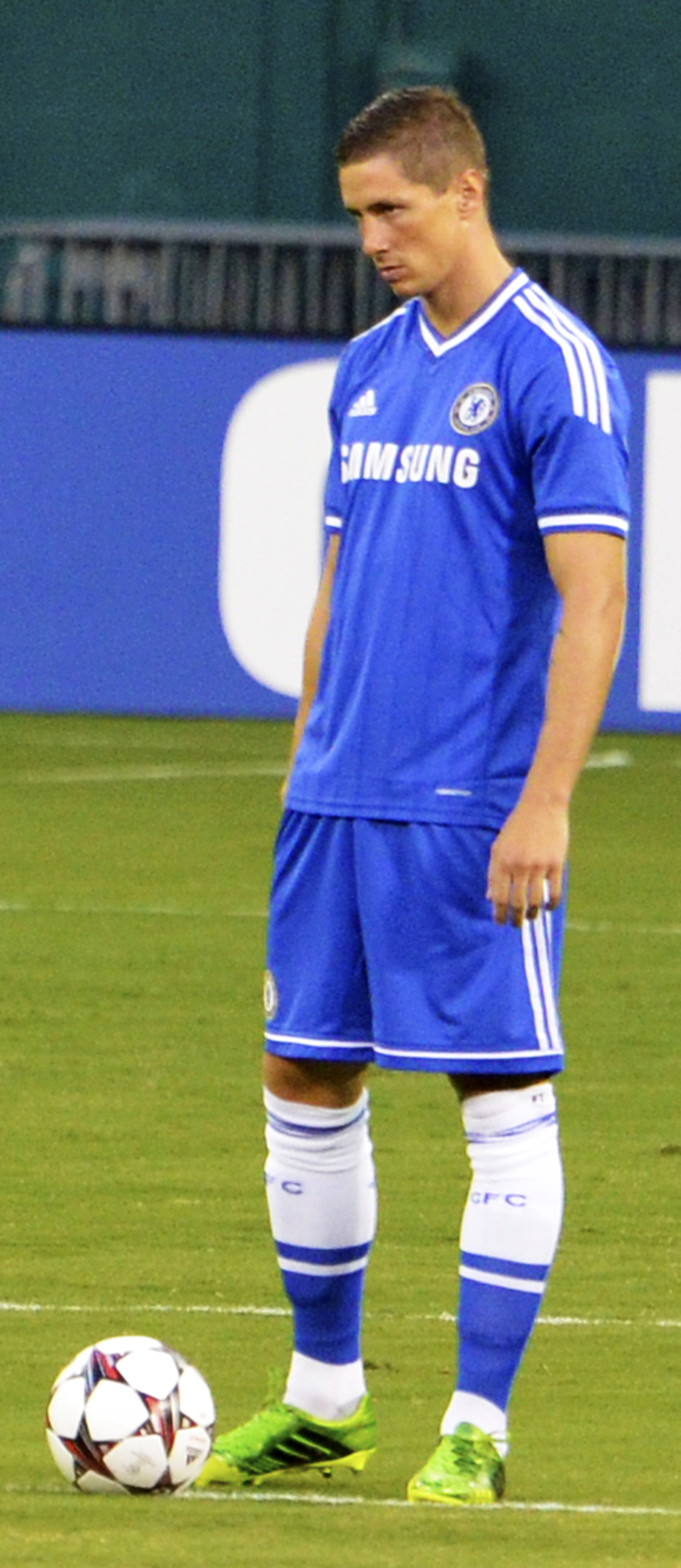
Fernando Torres playing for Chelsea in 2013. Chelsea signed Torres directly from Liverpool in January 2011.

After Rafael Benítez departed from Liverpool in June 2010, the club struggled greatly under new manager Roy Hodgson, which saw them win nine out of their first twenty matches in the Premier League and sitting 12th in the table, and one of the players who struggled was elite Spanish striker Fernando Torres. Despite Torres having a successful three and a half seasons at Liverpool, which saw him score 81 goals in nearly 150 appearances, he failed to win a single trophy at the club. Chelsea had previously expressed interest in signing Torres in 2008, but Torres responded by saying it would be "many years" before he left Liverpool. On 27 January 2011, Liverpool rejected a £40,000,000 bid from Chelsea for Torres, which was followed by Torres handing in a transfer request the next day, which was also rejected. Chelsea finally completed the signing of Torres on 31 January 2011, for £50,000,000, a then British transfer record and making Torres the sixth most expensive player in football history at the time, with the signing enraging Liverpool fans and boiling the blood in the rivalry even further.

Ironically, Torres made his Chelsea debut against Liverpool at Stamford Bridge on 6 February, where was he was greeted with flags and signs held up by Liverpool fans labelling him as a "traitor". Liverpool would go on to beat Chelsea 1–0, with a 69th-minute goal from Raul Meireles putting Fernando Torres' Chelsea debut in vain.

The next season's edition of the Premier League saw both Chelsea and Liverpool underperform, with both teams finishing outside of the top four, which in normal circumstances would have saw them both absent from Europe entirely next season, with Chelsea, who finished sixth, qualifying for the Champions League as the Champions League winners, which also put their fierce London rivals Tottenham Hotspur, who finished fourth, in the nightmare scenario of finishing in the top four and still not qualifying for the Champions League, who had to settle for Europa League football instead. Meanwhile, Liverpool, who finished 8th, qualified for the third qualifying round of the Europa League as the runners-up of the FA Cup. However, Liverpool still managed to do a Premier League double over Chelsea, defeating them both home and away, which included a 4–1 humiliation at Anfield in May 2012.

==== 2012 FA Cup final ====
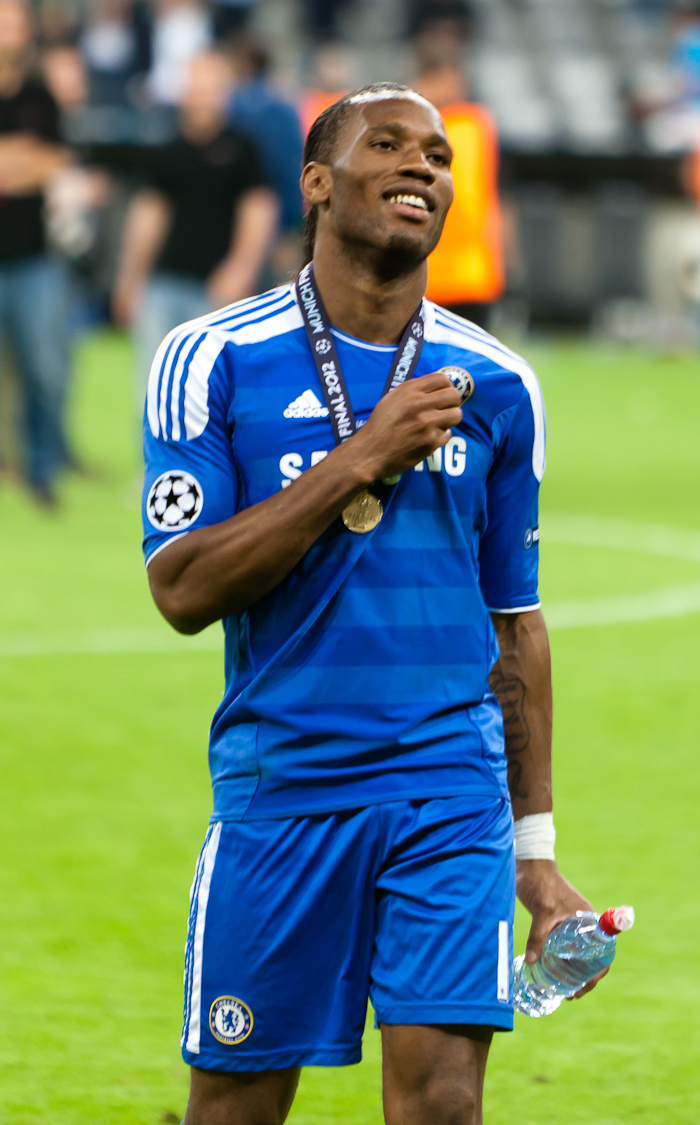
Chelsea striker Didier Drogba scored the winning goal in the final.

On 5 May 2012, Chelsea and Liverpool faced off in the final of the FA Cup for the very first time, at Wembley Stadium. Chelsea were looking to win their first trophy of the season, being managed by interim manager Roberto Di Matteo, who was prosperous about being appointed as Chelsea manager on a permanent basis. Meanwhile, Liverpool, who were being managed by club legend Kenny Dalglish, had already won the League Cup by beating Cardiff City on penalties in the final, also defeating Chelsea 2–0 in the fifth round en route to the final, and were aiming for a double. For Chelsea, this was their 11th appearance in a FA Cup final, having won on six occasions (1970, 1997, 2000, 2007, 2009, 2010) and lost on four occasions (1915, 1967, 1994, 2002). As for Liverpool, this was their 14th FA Cup final, winning the trophy seven times (1965, 1974, 1986, 1989, 1992, 2001, 2006) and being beaten six times (1914, 1950, 1971, 1977, 1988, 1996). On their way to the final, Chelsea defeated Portsmouth, West London rivals Queens Park Rangers, Birmingham City, Leicester City, and London rivals Tottenham Hotspur, whereas Liverpool defeated Oldham Athletic, rivals Manchester United, Brighton & Hove Albion, Stoke City, and Merseyside rivals Everton to earn their place in the final.

In the match, Ramires put Chelsea in front in the 11th minute after he dispossessed Liverpool midfielder Jay Spearing and beat Pepe Reina in the Liverpool area. Chelsea extended their lead in the 52nd minute when striker Didier Drogba scored. Liverpool substitute Andy Carroll scored in the 64th minute to reduce the deficit to one goal. Carroll thought he had scored a second in the 81st minute, but his header was saved on the line by Chelsea goalkeeper Petr Čech. Carroll ran off celebrating, thinking he had equalised and the ball had crossed the line, but referee Phil Dowd did not award a goal (unlike the Luis García "ghost goal" seven years prior), and Chelsea held on to win the match 2–1 and the FA Cup for the seventh time.

=== Title rivals (2013–15) ===
==== Luis Suárez biting incident ====
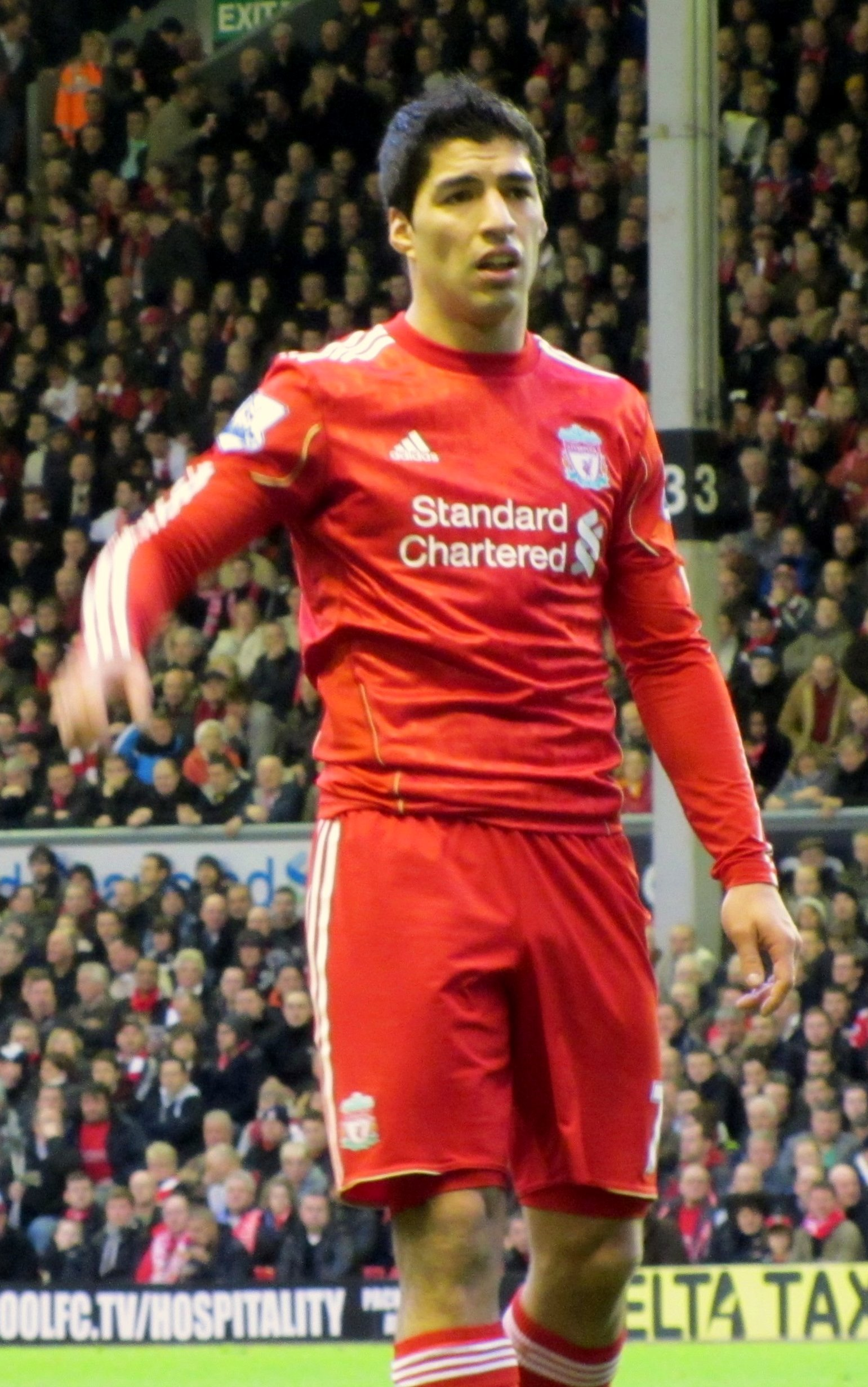
Luis Suárez has built a reputation over his career for controversially biting opponents

On 21 April 2013, during Liverpool's 2–2 draw with Chelsea in a Premier League match at Anfield, Liverpool striker Luis Suárez bit Chelsea defender Branislav Ivanović. This was not the first time that something like this had happened; it was the second time that Suárez had bitten an opponent. It was not noticed by the officials, and Suárez scored an equalizer in injury time. The bite prompted UK prime minister David Cameron to call on the FA to take a hard line with Suárez: the FA charged him with violent conduct and he was fined an undisclosed sum by his club. Contrary to claims from Suárez, Ivanović did not accept an apology. Suárez accepted the violent conduct charge but denied the FA's claim the standard punishment of three matches was clearly insufficient for his offence. A three-man independent panel appointed by the FA decided on a ten-game ban for Suárez, who did not appeal the ban; the panel criticized Suárez for not appreciating "the seriousness" of the incident when he argued against a long ban. The panel also wanted to send a "strong message that such deplorable behaviours do not have a place in football", while noting that "all players in the higher level of the game are seen as role models, have the duty to act professionally and responsibly, and set the highest example of good conduct to the rest of the game – especially to young players".

The 2013–14 Premier League season saw Chelsea, Liverpool, Arsenal and Manchester City battle it out in a four-way title race, which eventually boiled down to Chelsea, Liverpool, and City. Chelsea did the Premier League double over both Liverpool and Manchester City, but inconsistent form and losses against the low-block teams saw them fail to win the Premier League.

==== Steven Gerrard slip ====
2013–14 Premier League table before Liverpool vs. Chelsea
| Pos | Team | Pld | W | D | L | GF | GA | GD | Pts | Qualification |
|---|---|---|---|---|---|---|---|---|---|---|
| 1 | Liverpool (Q) | 35 | 25 | 5 | 5 | 96 | 44 | +52 | 80 | Qualification for the Champions League group stage |
| 2 | Chelsea (T) | 35 | 23 | 6 | 6 | 67 | 26 | +41 | 75 | Qualification for the Champions League group stage |
| 3 | Manchester City (T) | 34 | 23 | 5 | 6 | 91 | 35 | +56 | 74 | Qualification for the Champions League group stage |
| 4 | Arsenal | 35 | 21 | 7 | 7 | 62 | 41 | +21 | 70 | Qualification for the Champions League play-off round |
| 5 | Everton | 36 | 20 | 9 | 7 | 57 | 36 | +21 | 69 | Qualification for the Europa League group stage |

(Q) Qualified for the phase indicated; (T) Qualified, but not yet for the particular phase indicated

On 27 April 2014, Liverpool, now managed by Brendan Rodgers, welcomed Chelsea, now managed by a returning José Mourinho, to Anfield. At this point, the high-flying Reds were top of the Premier League on 80 points with just three games to go, five points clear of second-placed Chelsea and six of third-placed Manchester City (who had a game in hand). They had also scored nearly a century of Premier League goals, and were on course to win their first ever Premier League title, which would have happened if they were to win their last three games, which were Chelsea at home, Crystal Palace away, and Newcastle United at home. Additionally, a win against Chelsea would have seen the Blues be unable to catch Liverpool, as they would have been eight points behind them with two games left had they have won.

The match saw Steven Gerrard slip while receiving a pass in first half injury-time, which allowed Demba Ba to score for Chelsea and put them 1–0 up at Anfield. Liverpool ultimately were unable to equalise, as a goal from Willian in the dying moments of the game saw Chelsea run out 2–0 winners, with Liverpool only now being two points clear of their rivals from London and three points of clear of Manchester City, who had a game in hand and had +8 superior goal difference. Liverpool followed this up by throwing away a 3–0 lead at Crystal Palace and only managing to come out with a 3–3 draw, all but confirming Manchester City's Premier League victory.

The next season, Chelsea hosted Liverpool at Stamford Bridge on 10 May 2015, who at this point had been top of the Premier League for every single matchday. Liverpool provided a guard of honour for Chelsea before kick off. The match finished 1–1, with the goals coming from John Terry and Steven Gerrard. In the match, Gerrard, who had confirmed a few months prior that he would be departing from Liverpool at the end of the season, received a standing ovation from both the Liverpool and Chelsea fans as he was being substituted off. In a post-match interview, Gerrard had mixed feelings about being clapped off the pitch by Chelsea fans, stating:

"I was more happy with the ovation from the Liverpool fans. I think Chelsea fans have showed respect for a couple of seconds for me, but they've slaughtered me all game, so I'm not going to get drawn into wishing the Chelsea fans very well. It was nice of them to turn up for once today. But yeah, you know when you get a standing ovation at a stadium, it's nice, but what's important to me is the support from the Liverpool fans and they've been with me since day one."

=== Recent years (2016–present) ===
Since then, the rivalry has cooled down a little bit, though fans of both clubs still hold a dislike for each other. Liverpool, then under Jürgen Klopp, would beat Chelsea in four successive major finals during this period: the 2019 UEFA Super Cup, the 2022 EFL Cup final and the 2022 FA Cup final (all on penalties), as well as finally winning their first Premier League title in the 2019–20 season. The two clubs met again in the final of the 2024 EFL Cup, with Liverpool winning 1–0 in extra-time thanks to a header from Reds captain Virgil van Dijk. Chelsea also gave Liverpool a guard of honour when the latter won the 2019–20 and 2024–25 titles.

== Crossing the divide ==
=== Played for both teams ===
Below are the players who have played for both Chelsea and Liverpool.

==== Chelsea, then Liverpool ====
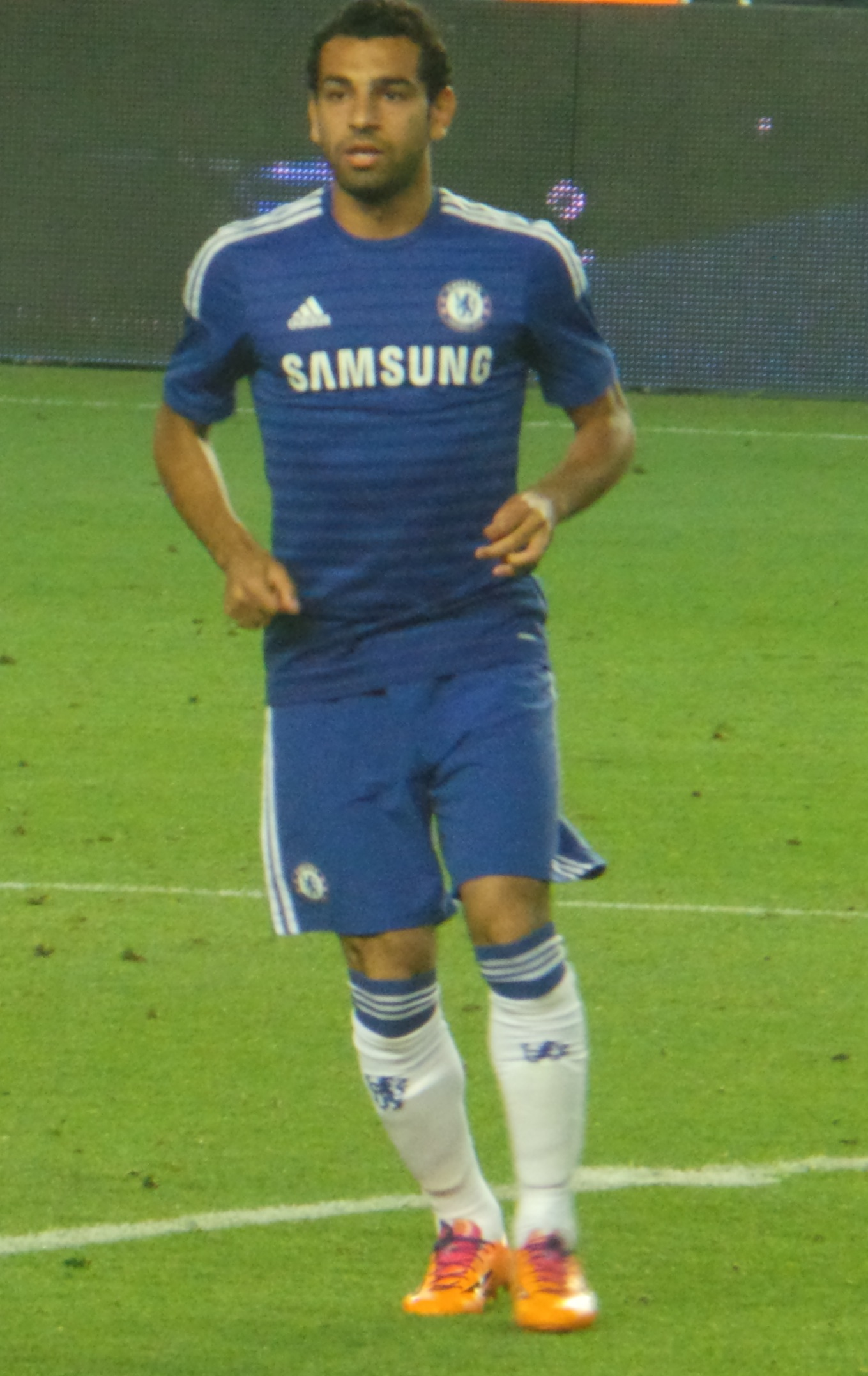
Mohamed Salah joined Chelsea in 2014, but was used sparingly, only making 19 appearances in total for the club.

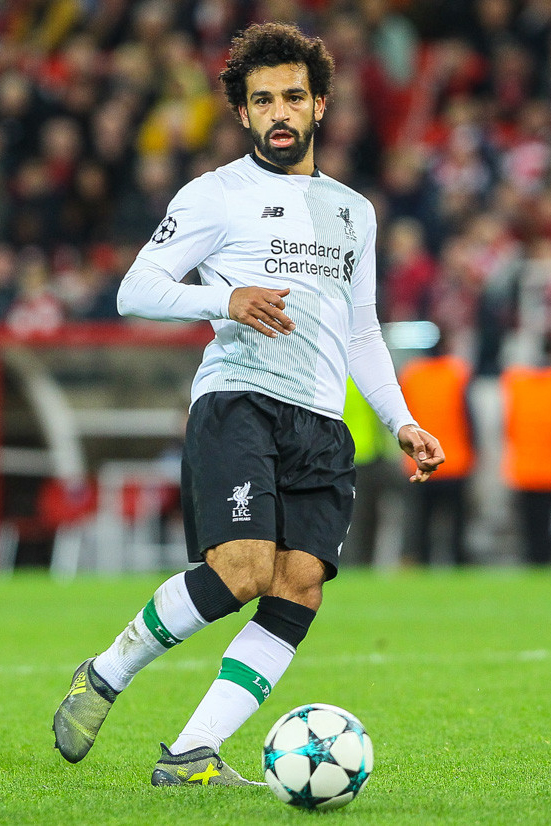
The Egyptian signed for Liverpool in 2017, scoring 44 goals in his debut season. With Liverpool, Salah won two Premier Leagues, the UEFA Champions League, and the FIFA Club World Cup.

| Player | Pos. | Chelsea career span | Liverpool career span |
|---|---|---|---|
| (England) Tony Hateley | FW | 1966–1967 | 1967–1968 |
| (England) Nigel Spackman | MF | 1983–1987; 1992–1996 | 1987–1989 |
| (Netherlands) Boudewijn Zenden | FW | 2001–2004 | 2005–2007 |
| (England) Glen Johnson | DF | 2003–2007 | 2009–2015 |
| (England) Joe Cole | FW | 2003–2010 | 2010–2013 |
| (Italy) Fabio Borini | FW | 2009–2011 | 2012–2015 |
| (England) Daniel Sturridge | FW | 2009–2013 | 2013–2019 |
| (Nigeria) Victor Moses | MF | 2012–2021 | 2013–2014 (loan) |
| (Egypt) Mohamed Salah | FW | 2014–2016 | 2017–2026 |
| (England) Dominic Solanke | FW | 2014–2017 | 2017–2019 |

==== Liverpool, then Chelsea ====
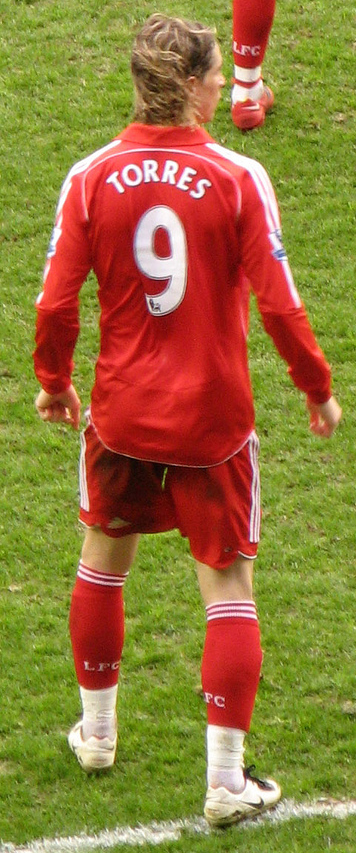
Fernando Torres arrived at Liverpool in 2007, becoming the fastest Liverpool player to score 50 Premier League goals.

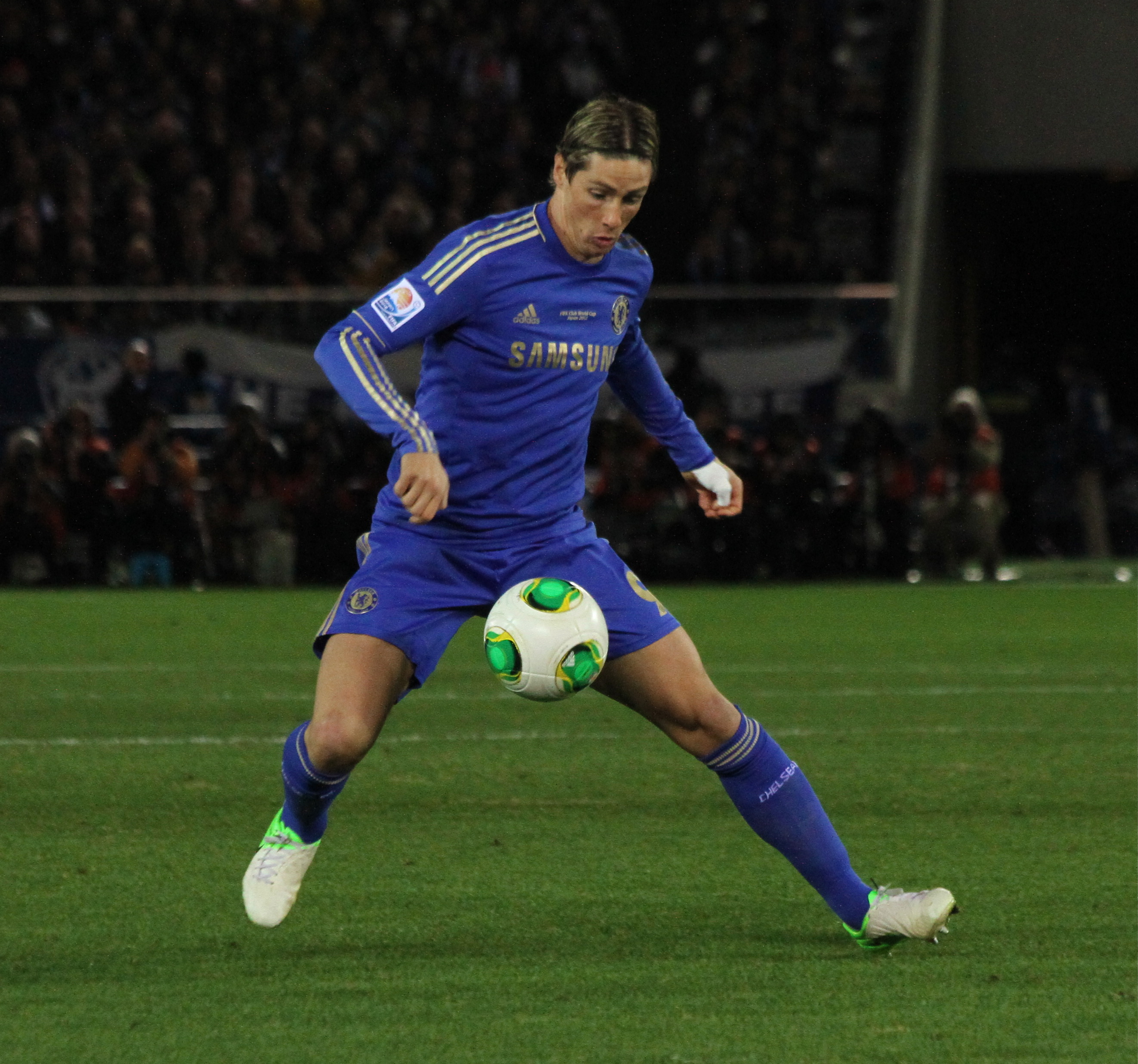
Torres left Liverpool in January 2011 to join Chelsea for a then British record transfer fee of £50,000,000. At Chelsea, Torres won the FA Cup, UEFA Champions League and UEFA Europa League, though his goalscoring rate and performances drastically declined.

| Player | Pos. | Liverpool career span | Chelsea career span |
|---|---|---|---|
| (England) Alf Hanson | FW | 1931–1938 | 1938–1946 |
| (Wales) Joey Jones | DF | 1975–1978 | 1982–1985 |
| (France) Nicolas Anelka | FW | 2001–2002 | 2008–2012 |
| (Israel) Yossi Benayoun | MF | 2007–2010 | 2010–2013 |
| (Spain) Fernando Torres | FW | 2007–2011 | 2011–2015 |
| (Portugal) Raul Meireles | MF | 2010–2011 | 2011–2012 |
| (England) Raheem Sterling | FW | 2012–2015 | 2022–2026 |
| (England) Jordan Henderson | MF | 2011–2023 | 2026–present |

=== Managing both teams ===
| Manager | Chelsea career span | Liverpool career span |
|---|---|---|
| (Spain) Rafael Benítez | 2012–2013 (interim) | 2004–2010 |

=== Playing for one, managing the other ===
| Name | Chelsea career span | Liverpool career span |
|---|---|---|
| (Spain) Xabi Alonso | 2026–present (manager) | 2004–2009 (player) |

== Honours ==
As of 13 July 2025

| National competitions | Chelsea | Liverpool |
|---|---|---|
| First Division / Premier League | 6 | 20 |
| FA Cup | 8 | 8 |
| League Cup | 5 | 10 |
| FA Community Shield | 4 | 16 |
| FL Super Cup | 0 | 1 |
| International competitions | Chelsea | Liverpool |
| UEFA Champions League | 2 | 6 |
| UEFA Europa League | 2 | 3 |
| UEFA Cup Winners' Cup | 2 | 0 |
| UEFA Conference League | 1 | 0 |
| UEFA Super Cup | 2 | 4 |
| FIFA Club World Cup | 2 | 1 |
| Total | 34 | 69 |

== Results and statistics ==
=== Premier League ===
==== Chelsea at home (Stamford Bridge) ====
| Season | Date | Score | Chelsea goalscorers | Liverpool goalscorers | Attendance |
|---|---|---|---|---|---|
| 1992–93 | 10 February 1993 | 0–0 | | | 20,981 |
| 1993–94 | 25 September 1993 | 1–0 | Shipperley 49' | | 31,271 |
| 1994–95 | 18 December 1994 | 0–0 | | | 27,050 |
| 1995–96 | 30 December 1995 | 2–2 | Spencer 9', 45' | McManaman 33', 76' | 31,137 |
| 1996-97 | 1 January 1997 | 1–0 | Di Matteo 43' | | 28,329 |
| 1997–98 | 25 April 1998 | 4–1 | Hughes 11', 78', Clarke 67', Flo 72' | Riedle 45' | 34,639 |
| 1998–99 | 27 February 1999 | 2–1 | Lebouef 7' (pen.), Goldbæk 38' | Owen 77' | 34,822 |
| 1999–2000 | 29 April 2000 | 2–0 | Weah 2', Di Matteo 14' | | 34,957 |
| 2000–01 | 1 October 2000 | 3–0 | Westerveld 10' (o.g.), Hasselbaink 11', Guðjohnsen 71' | | 34,966 |
| 2001–02 | 16 December 2001 | 4–0 | Le Saux 3', Hasselbaink 28', Dalla Bona 71', Guðjohnsen 90' | | 41,174 |
| 2002–03 | 11 May 2003 | 2–1 | Desailly 13', Grønkjær 27' | Hyypiä 11' | 41,911 |
| 2003–04 | 7 January 2004 | 0–1 | | Cheyrou 33' | 41,533 |
| 2004–05 | 3 October 2004 | 1–0 | J. Cole 64' | | 42,028 |
| 2005–06 | 5 February 2006 | 2–0 | Gallas 35', Crespo 68' | | 42,316 |
| 2006–07 | 17 September 2006 | 1–0 | Drogba 42' | | 41,882 |
| 2007–08 | 10 February 2008 | 0–0 | | | 41,788 |
| 2008–09 | 26 October 2008 | 0–1 | | Alonso 10' | 41,705 |
| 2009–10 | 4 October 2009 | 2–0 | Anelka 60', Malouda 90+1' | | 41,732 |
| 2010–11 | 6 February 2011 | 0–1 | | Meireles 69' | 41,829 |
| 2011–12 | 20 November 2011 | 1–2 | Sturridge 54' | Rodríguez 33', Johnson 87' | 41,820 |
| 2012–13 | 11 November 2012 | 1–1 | Terry 20' | Suárez 73' | 41,627 |
| 2013–14 | 29 December 2013 | 2–1 | Hazard 17', Eto'o 34' | Škrtel 4' | 41,614 |
| 2014–15 | 10 May 2015 | 1–1 | Terry 5' | Gerrard 44' | 41,547 |
| 2015–16 | 31 October 2015 | 1–3 | Ramires 4' | Coutinho 45+3', 74', Benteke 83' | 41,577 |
| 2016–17 | 16 September 2016 | 1–2 | Costa 61' | Lovren 17', Henderson 36' | 41,514 |
| 2017–18 | 6 May 2018 | 1–0 | Giroud 32' | | 41,314 |
| 2018–19 | 29 September 2018 | 1–1 | Hazard 25' | Sturridge 89' | 40,625 |
| 2019–20 | 22 September 2019 | 1–2 | Kanté 71' | Alexander-Arnold 14', Firmino 30' | 40,638 |
| 2020–21 | 20 September 2020 | 0–2 | | Mané 50', 54' | 0 (Note: Behind closed doors) |
| 2021–22 | 2 January 2022 | 2–2 | Kovačić 42', Pulisic 45+1' | Mané 9', Salah 26' | 40,072 |
| 2022–23 | 4 April 2023 | 0–0 | | | 40,093 |
| 2023–24 | 13 August 2023 | 1–1 | Disasi 37' | Díaz 18' | 40,096 |
| 2024–25 | 4 May 2025 | 3–1 | Fernández 3', Quansah 56' (o.g.), Palmer 90+6' (pen.) | Van Dijk 85' | 39,829 |
| 2025–26 | 4 October 2025 | 2–1 | Caicedo 14', Estêvão 90+5' | Gakpo 63' | 39,767 |
| 2026–27 | 5 December 2026 | – | | | |

==== Liverpool at home (Anfield) ====
| Season | Date | Score | Liverpool goalscorers | Chelsea goalscorers | Attendance |
|---|---|---|---|---|---|
| 1992–93 | 5 September 1992 | 2–1 | Saunders 27', Redknapp 89' | Harford 72' | 34,199 |
| 1993–94 | 19 March 1994 | 2–1 | Rush 8', Burley 19' (o.g.) | Burley 50' | 38,629 |
| 1994–95 | 9 November 1994 | 3–1 | Fowler 9', 10' Ruddock 25' | Spencer 3' | 32,855 |
| 1995–96 | 16 March 1996 | 2–0 | Wright 53', Fowler 62' | | 40,820 |
| 1996–97 | 21 September 1996 | 5–1 | Fowler 15', Berger 42', 50', Andy Myers 45' (o.g.), Barnes 57' | Lebouef 85' (pen.) | 40,739 |
| 1997–98 | 5 October 1997 | 4–2 | Berger 20', 35', 57', Fowler 64' | Zola 22', Poyet 85' (pen.) | 36,647 |
| 1998–99 | 4 October 1998 | 1–1 | Redknapp 83' | Casiraghi 10' | 44,404 |
| 1999–2000 | 16 October 1999 | 1–0 | Thompson 49' | | 44,826 |
| 2000–01 | 8 May 2001 | 2–2 | Owen 8', 60' | Hasselbaink 13', 67' | 43,588 |
| 2001–02 | 24 March 2002 | 1–0 | Šmicer 90' | | 44,203 |
| 2002–03 | 6 October 2002 | 1–0 | Owen 90' | | 43,856 |
| 2003–04 | 17 August 2003 | 1–2 | Owen 79' (pen.) | Verón 25', Hasselbaink 87' | 44,080 |
| 2004–05 | 1 January 2005 | 0–1 | | J. Cole 80' | 43,976 |
| 2005–06 | 2 October 2005 | 1–4 | Gerrard 36' | Lampard 27' (pen.), Duff 43', J. Cole 63', Geremi 82' | 45,022 |
| 2006–07 | 20 January 2007 | 2–0 | Kuyt 4', Pennant 18' | | 44,969 |
| 2007–08 | 19 August 2007 | 1–1 | Torres 15' | Lampard 62' (pen.) | 43,924 |
| 2008–09 | 1 February 2009 | 2–0 | Torres 89', 90+4' | | 44,174 |
| 2009–10 | 2 May 2010 | 0–2 | | Drogba 33', Lampard 54' | 44,375 |
| 2010–11 | 7 November 2010 | 2–0 | Torres 11', 44' | | 44,238 |
| 2011–12 | 8 May 2012 | 4–1 | Essien 19' (o.g.), Henderson 25', Agger 28', Shelvey 61' | Ramires 50' | 40,721 |
| 2012–13 | 21 April 2013 | 2–2 | Sturridge 52', Suárez 90+7' | Oscar 26', Hazard 57' (pen.) | 45,009 |
| 2013–14 | 27 April 2014 | 0–2 | | Ba 45+3', Willian 90+4' | 44,726 |
| 2014–15 | 8 November 2014 | 1–2 | Can 9' | Cahill 14', Costa 67' | 44,698 |
| 2015–16 | 11 May 2016 | 1–1 | Benteke 90+2' | Hazard 32' | 43,210 |
| 2016–17 | 31 January 2017 | 1–1 | Wijnaldum 57' | David Luiz 24' | 53,157 |
| 2017–18 | 25 November 2017 | 1–1 | Salah 65' | Willian 85' | 53,225 |
| 2018–19 | 14 April 2019 | 2–0 | Mané 51', Salah 53' | | 53,279 |
| 2019–20 | 22 July 2020 | 5–3 | Keïta 23', Alexander-Arnold 38', Wijnaldum 43', Firmino 54', Oxlade-Chamberlain 84' | Giroud 45+3', Abraham 61', Pulisic 73' | 0 |
| 2020–21 | 4 March 2021 | 0–1 | | Mount 42' | 0 |
| 2021–22 | 28 August 2021 | 1–1 | Salah 45+5' (pen.) | Havertz 22' | 53,100 |
| 2022–23 | 21 January 2023 | 0–0 | | | 53,126 |
| 2023–24 | 31 January 2024 | 4–1 | Jota 23', Bradley 39', Szoboszlai 65', Díaz 79' | Nkunku 71' | 57,524 |
| 2024–25 | 20 October 2024 | 2–1 | Salah 29' (pen.), Jones 51' | Jackson 48' | 60,277 |
| 2025–26 | 9 May 2026 | 1–1 | Gravenberch 6' | Fernández 35' | 60,429 |

=== Cup meetings ===
| Season | Date | Competition | Home | Score | Away | Home goalscorers | Away goalscorers | Venue | Attendance |
|---|---|---|---|---|---|---|---|---|---|
| 1931–32 | 27 February 1932 | FA Cup (sixth round) | Liverpool | 0–2 | Chelsea | | Gallacher 42', Pearson 89' | Anfield | 57,804 |
| 1961–62 | 6 January 1962 | FA Cup (third round) | Liverpool | 4–3 | Chelsea | St John 16', 41', Hunt 28', A'Court 44' | Tambling 18', 67', Bridges 76' | Anfield | 48,455 |
| 1964–65 | 27 March 1965 | FA Cup (semi-finals) | Liverpool | 2–0 | Chelsea | Thompson 63', Stevenson 79' (pen.) | | Villa Park | 67,686 |
| 1965–66 | 22 January 1966 | FA Cup (third round) | Liverpool | 1–2 | Chelsea | Hunt 2' | Osgood 7', Tambling 67' | Anfield | 54,097 |
| 1977–78 | 30 August 1977 | League Cup (second round) | Liverpool | 2–0 | Chelsea | Dalglish 25', Case 47' | | Anfield | 33,170 |
| 1977–78 | 7 January 1978 | FA Cup (third round) | Chelsea | 4–2 | Liverpool | Walker 15', 64' Finnieston 49', Langley 51' | Johnson 60', Dalglish 81' | Stamford Bridge | 45,449 |
| 1981–82 | 13 February 1982 | FA Cup (fifth round) | Chelsea | 2–0 | Liverpool | Rhoades-Brown 8', Lee 85' | | Stamford Bridge | 41,422 |
| 1985–86 | 26 January 1986 | FA Cup (fourth round) | Chelsea | 1–2 | Liverpool | Speedie 62' | Rush 45', Lawrenson | Stamford Bridge | 33,625 |
| 1996–97 | 26 January 1997 | FA Cup (fourth round) | Chelsea | 4–2 | Liverpool | Hughes 50', Zola 58', Gianluca Vialli 63', 76' | Fowler 10', Collymore 21' | Stamford Bridge | 27,950 |
| 2000–01 | 1 November 2000 | League Cup (third round) | Liverpool | 2–1 (Note: After extra time) | Chelsea | Murphy 50', Fowler 104' | Zola 29' | Anfield | 29,370 |
| 2004–05 | 27 February 2005 | League Cup (final) | Liverpool | 2–3 | Chelsea | Riise 1', Antonio Núñez 113' | Gerrard 79' (o.g.), Drogba 107', Kežman 112' | Millennium Stadium | 78,000 |
| 2004–05 | 27 April 2005 | UEFA Champions League (semi-finals) | Chelsea | 0–0 | Liverpool | | | Stamford Bridge | 40,497 |
| 2004–05 | 3 May 2005 | UEFA Champions League (semi-finals) | Liverpool | 1–0 (1–0 agg.) | Chelsea | García 4' | | Anfield | 42,529 |
| 2005–06 | 28 September 2005 | UEFA Champions League (group stage) | Liverpool | 0–0 | Chelsea | | | Anfield | 42,529 |
| 2005–06 | 6 December 2005 | UEFA Champions League (group stage) | Chelsea | 0–0 | Liverpool | | | Stamford Bridge | 41,600 |
| 2005–06 | 22 April 2006 | FA Cup (semi-finals) | Chelsea | 1–2 | Liverpool | Drogba 69' | Riise 20', García 52' | Old Trafford | 64,575 |
| 2006–07 | 13 August 2006 | FA Community Shield | Chelsea | 1–2 | Liverpool | Shevchenko 43' | Riise 9', Crouch 80' | Millennium Stadium | 56,275 |
| 2006–07 | 25 April 2007 | UEFA Champions League (semi-finals) | Chelsea | 1–0 | Liverpool | J. Cole 29' | | Stamford Bridge | 39,483 |
| 2006–07 | 1 May 2007 | UEFA Champions League (semi-finals) | Liverpool | 1–0 (Note: Liverpool won 4–1 on penalties after extra time) (1–1 agg.) | Chelsea | Agger 22' | | Anfield | 42,554 |
| 2007–08 | 19 December 2007 | League Cup (fifth round) | Chelsea | 2–0 | Liverpool | Lampard 58', Shevchenko 89' | | Stamford Bridge | 41,366 |
| 2007–08 | 22 April 2008 | UEFA Champions League (semi-finals) | Liverpool | 1–1 | Chelsea | Kuyt 43' | Riise 90+5' (o.g.) | Anfield | 42,180 |
| 2007–08 | 30 April 2008 | UEFA Champions League (semi-finals) | Chelsea | 3–2 (4–3 agg.) | Liverpool | Drogba 33', 105', Lampard 98' (pen.) | Torres 64', Babel 117' | Stamford Bridge | 38,900 |
| 2008–09 | 8 April 2009 | UEFA Champions League (quarter-finals) | Liverpool | 1–3 | Chelsea | Torres 6' | Ivanović 39', 62', Drogba 67' | Anfield | 42,543 |
| 2008–09 | 14 April 2009 | UEFA Champions League (quarter-finals) | Chelsea | 4–4 (7–5 agg.) | Liverpool | Drogba 51', Alex 57', Lampard 76', 89' | Aurélio 19', Alonso 28' (pen.), Lucas Leiva 81', Kuyt 83' | Stamford Bridge | 38,286 |
| 2011–12 | 29 November 2011 | League Cup (quarter-finals) | Chelsea | 0–2 | Liverpool | | Rodríguez 58', Kelly 63' | Stamford Bridge | 40,511 |
| 2011–12 | 5 May 2012 | FA Cup (final) | Chelsea | 2–1 | Liverpool | Ramires 11', Drogba 52' | Carroll 64' | Wembley Stadium | 89,102 |
| 2014–15 | 20 January 2015 | League Cup (semi-finals) | Liverpool | 1–1 | Chelsea | Sterling 59' | Hazard 18' (pen.) | Anfield | 44,573 |
| 2014–15 | 27 January 2015 | League Cup (semi-finals) | Chelsea | 1–0 (2–1 agg.) | Liverpool | Ivanović 94' | | Stamford Bridge | 40,659 |
| 2018–19 | 26 September 2018 | EFL Cup (third round) | Liverpool | 1–2 | Chelsea | Sturridge 58' | Emerson 79', Hazard 85' | Anfield | 45,503 |
| 2019–20 | 14 August 2019 | UEFA Super Cup | Liverpool | 2–2 (Note: Liverpool won 5–4 on penalties after extra time) | Chelsea | Mané 48', 95' | Giroud 36', Jorginho 101' (pen.) | Vodafone Park | 38,434 |
| 2019–20 | 3 March 2020 | FA Cup (fifth round) | Chelsea | 2–0 | Liverpool | Willian 13', Barkley 64' | | Stamford Bridge | 40,103 |
| 2021–22 | 27 February 2022 | EFL Cup (final) | Chelsea | 0–0 (Note: Liverpool won 11–10 on penalties after extra time) | Liverpool | | | Wembley Stadium | 85,512 |
| 2021–22 | 14 May 2022 | FA Cup (final) | Chelsea | 0–0 (Note: Liverpool won 6–5 on penalties after extra time) | Liverpool | | | Wembley Stadium | 84,897 |
| 2023–24 | 25 February 2024 | EFL Cup (final) | Chelsea | 0–1 | Liverpool | | Van Dijk 118' | Wembley Stadium | 88,868 |
| 2026–27 | 28 October 2026 | EFL Cup (fourth round) | Liverpool | 1–1 (Note: Liverpool won 6–5 on penalties) | Chelsea | Gakpo 43' (pen.) | Rogers 40' (pen.) | Anfield | 60,214 |

=== Statistics ===
==== Head-to-head record ====
As of 28 October 2026

| Competition | Matches | Chelsea wins | Draws | Liverpool wins |
|---|---|---|---|---|
| League | 167 | 53 | 41 | 73 |
| FA Cup | 12 | 7 | 1 | 4 |
| EFL Cup | 11 | 4 | 3 | 4 |
| UEFA Champions League | 10 | 3 | 5 | 2 |
| UEFA Super Cup | 1 | 0 | 1 | 0 |
| FA Community Shield | 1 | 0 | 0 | 1 |
| Total | 202 | 67 | 51 | 84 |

==== Top appearance makers (all competitions) ====
| Rank | Player | Club | Appearances |
|---|---|---|---|
| 1 | (England) Jamie Carragher | Liverpool | 45 |
| 2 | (England) Steven Gerrard | Liverpool | 40 |
| 3 | (England) Frank Lampard | Chelsea | 39 |
| 3 | (England) John Terry | Chelsea | 39 |
| 5 | (England) Ron Harris | Chelsea | 31 |
| 6 | (Czech Republic) Petr Čech | Chelsea | 30 |
| 7 | (England) Ian Callaghan | Liverpool | 28 |
| 7 | (Ivory Coast) Didier Drogba | Chelsea | 28 |
| 9 | (England) Jordan Henderson | Liverpool; Chelsea | 27 |
| 9 | (Spain) Pepe Reina | Liverpool | 27 |

==== Top scorers (all competitions) ====
| Rank | Player | Club(s) | Goals |
|---|---|---|---|
| 1 | (Wales) Ian Rush | Liverpool | 10 |
| 2 | (Ivory Coast) Didier Drogba | Chelsea | 9 |
| 2 | (England) Roger Hunt | Liverpool | 9 |
| 4 | (England) Bobby Tambling | Chelsea | 8 |
| 5 | (England) Robbie Fowler | Liverpool | 7 |
| 5 | (England) Frank Lampard | Chelsea | 7 |
| 5 | (Spain) Fernando Torres | Liverpool; Chelsea | 7 |
| 8 | (England) Kerry Dixon | Chelsea | 6 |
| 8 | (Scotland) Billy Liddell | Liverpool | 6 |
| 8 | (Senegal) Sadio Mane | Liverpool | 6 |
| 8 | (England) Dick Spence | Chelsea | 6 |

== Highest attendances ==
- Chelsea 2–1 Liverpool: 89,102 (5 May 2012), Wembley Stadium (neutral)
- Chelsea 0–1 Liverpool: 88,868 (25 February 2024), Wembley Stadium (neutral)
- Chelsea 0–0 Liverpool: 85,512 (27 February 2022), Wembley Stadium (neutral)
- Chelsea 0–0 Liverpool: 84,897 (14 May 2022), Wembley Stadium (neutral)
- Liverpool 2–3 Chelsea: 78,000 (27 February 2005), Millennium Stadium (neutral)
- Liverpool 2–0 Chelsea: 67,686 (27 March 1965), Villa Park (Aston Villa home)
- Chelsea 1–2 Liverpool: 64,575 (22 April 2006), Old Trafford (Manchester United home)
- Chelsea 4–0 Liverpool: 62,587 (16 April 1965), Stamford Bridge (Chelsea home)
- Liverpool 2–1 Chelsea: 60,277 (20 October 2024), Anfield (Liverpool home)
- Liverpool 2–2 Chelsea: 58,757 (27 December 1949), Anfield (Liverpool home)

== See also ==
- List of sports rivalries in the United Kingdom
