= Calderhead =

Calderhead is a Scottish surname. Notable people with the surname include:

- David Calderhead (1864–1938), Scottish footballer and manager
- David Calderhead Jr., Scottish footballer and manager, son of David
- Iris Calderhead (1889–1966), American suffragist and organizer
- William A. Calderhead (1844–1928), American politician from Kansas
