= 1922–23 Chelsea F.C. season =

English football club season

Chelsea
1922–23 season
- Chairman: Claude Kirby
- Manager: David Calderhead
- Stadium: Stamford Bridge
- First Division: 19th
- FA Cup: Second round
- Top goalscorer: League: Harry Ford / Buchanan Sharp (10); All: Harry Ford / Buchanan Sharp (10)
- Highest home attendance: 67,000 vs Southampton (3 February 1923)
- Lowest home attendance: 12,000 vs Blackburn Rovers (5 May 1923)
- Average home league attendance: 30,667
- Biggest win: 4–0 v Oldham Athletic (23 September 1922); 4–0 v Nottingham Forest (26th Dec 1922)
- Biggest defeat: 1–6 v Cardiff City (10 March 1923)
Home colours	Away colours

The 1922–23 season was Chelsea Football Club's fourteenth competitive season.

== Table ==
Pos	Team	Pld	W	D	L	GF	GA	GAv	Pts	Relegation
17	Birmingham	42	13	11	18	41	57	0.719	37	
18	Middlesbrough	42	13	10	19	57	63	0.905	36	
19	Chelsea	42	9	18	15	45	53	0.849	36	
20	Nottingham Forest	42	13	8	21	41	70	0.586	34	
21	Stoke (R)	42	10	10	22	47	67	0.701	30	Relegation to the Second Division

Source: World Football
Rules for classification: 1) Points; 2) Goal average; 3) Goals scored
(R) Relegated
