= 1933–34 Chelsea F.C. season =

English football club season

Chelsea
1933–34 season
- Chairman: Claude Kirby
- Manager: Leslie Knighton
- Stadium: Stamford Bridge
- First Division: 19th
- FA Cup: Fifth round
- Top goalscorer: League: George Mills (14); All: Hughie Gallacher (16)
- Highest home attendance: 67,454 vs Tottenham Hotspur (30 September 1933)
- Lowest home attendance: 12,800 vs Sunderland (26 December 1933)
- Average home league attendance: 29,774
- Biggest win: 5–0 v Sheffield United (20 January 1934)
- Biggest defeat: 1–6 v Huddersfield Town (4 September 1933)
| Home colours | Away colours |

The 1933–34 season was Chelsea Football Club's twenty-fifth competitive season. The club had a new manager for the first time since 1907, as long-serving David Calderhead left during the close-season, and was succeeded by Leslie Knighton.

== Football League First Division Table ==
| Pos | Team | Pld | W | D | L | GF | GA | GAv | Pts | Relegation |
|---|---|---|---|---|---|---|---|---|---|---|
| 17 | Leicester City | 42 | 14 | 11 | 17 | 59 | 74 | 0.797 | 39 | |
| 18 | Liverpool | 42 | 14 | 10 | 18 | 79 | 87 | 0.908 | 38 | |
| 19 | Chelsea | 42 | 14 | 8 | 20 | 67 | 69 | 0.971 | 36 | |
| 20 | Birmingham | 42 | 12 | 12 | 18 | 54 | 56 | 0.964 | 36 | |
| 21 | Newcastle United (R) | 42 | 10 | 14 | 18 | 68 | 77 | 0.883 | 34 | Relegation to the Second Division |

Source: World Football
Rules for classification: 1) Points; 2) Goal average; 3) Goals scored
(R) Relegated
