= 1932–33 Chelsea F.C. season =

English football club season

Chelsea
1932–33 season
- Chairman: Claude Kirby
- Manager: David Calderhead
- Stadium: Stamford Bridge
- First Division: 18th
- FA Cup: Third round
- Top goalscorer: League: Hughie Gallacher (19); All: Hughie Gallacher (19)
- Highest home attendance: 72,260 vs Arsenal (22 April 1933)
- Lowest home attendance: 12,968 vs Bolton Wanderers (25 February 1933)
- Average home league attendance: 31,485
- Biggest win: 6–0 v Leeds United (8 April 1933)
- Biggest defeat: 0–4 v Blackpool (29 October 1932)
Home colours	Away colours

The 1932–33 season was Chelsea Football Club's twenty-fourth competitive season. Chelsea finished 18th in the First Division and were knocked out in the third round of the FA Cup. David Calderhead, who had been Chelsea's secretary-manager for 26 years, retired at the end of the season.

== Table ==
Pos	Team	Pld	W	D	L	GF	GA	GAv	Pts
16	Manchester City	42	16	5	21	68	71	0.958	37
17	Middlesbrough	42	14	9	19	63	73	0.863	37
18	Chelsea	42	14	7	21	63	73	0.863	35
19	Leicester City	42	11	13	18	75	89	0.843	35
20	Wolverhampton Wanderers	42	13	9	20	80	96	0.833	35

Source: World Football
Rules for classification: 1) Points; 2) Goal average; 3) Goals scored
