= 1930–31 Chelsea F.C. season =

English football club season

Chelsea
1930–31 season
- Chairman: Claude Kirby
- Manager: David Calderhead
- Stadium: Stamford Bridge
- First Division: 12th
- FA Cup: Quarter-finals
- Top goalscorer: League: Hughie Gallacher (14); All: Hughie Gallacher (14)
- Highest home attendance: 74,667 vs Arsenal (29 November 1930)
- Lowest home attendance: 12,968 vs Birmingham (25 March 1931)
- Average home league attendance: 35,580
- Biggest win: 5–0 v Sunderland (13 December 1930); 5–0 v Grimsby Town (27 December 1930)
- Biggest defeat: 2–6 v Birmingham (25 October 1930); 2–6 v Derby County (6 December 1930)
Home colours	Away colours

The 1930–31 Chelsea F.C. season was the 22nd edition of Chelsea Football Club annual football competition. It was the club's first season return in the top-flight after a six-year hiatus.

== Table ==
Pos	Team	Pld	W	D	L	GF	GA	GAv	Pts
10	Blackburn Rovers	42	17	8	17	83	84	0.988	42
11	Sunderland	42	16	9	17	89	85	1.047	41
12	Chelsea	42	15	10	17	64	67	0.955	40
13	Grimsby Town	42	17	5	20	82	87	0.943	39
14	Bolton Wanderers	42	15	9	18	68	81	0.840	39

Source: World Football
Rules for classification: 1) Points; 2) Goal average; 3) Goals scored
