= 1931–32 Chelsea F.C. season =

English football club season

Chelsea
1931–32 season
- Chairman: Claude Kirby
- Manager: David Calderhead
- Stadium: Stamford Bridge
- First Division: 12th
- FA Cup: Semi-finals
- Top goalscorer: League: Hughie Gallacher (24); All: Hughie Gallacher (30)
- Highest home attendance: 64,427 vs Arsenal (21 November 1931)
- Lowest home attendance: 12,605 vs Newcastle United (14 April 1932)
- Average home league attendance: 32,230
- Biggest win: 4–0 v Middlesbrough (2 January 1932)
- Biggest defeat: 2–7 v Everton (14 November 1931)
Home colours	Away colours

The 1931–32 season was Chelsea Football Club's twenty-third competitive season. While the team's league form remained indifferent and they finished 12th for the second successive year, they did advance to the semi-finals of the FA Cup, where they lost to Newcastle United.

== Table ==
Pos	Team	Pld	W	D	L	GF	GA	GAv	Pts
10	Liverpool	42	19	6	17	81	93	0.871	44
11	Newcastle United	42	18	6	18	80	87	0.920	42
12	Chelsea	42	16	8	18	69	73	0.945	40
13	Sunderland	42	15	10	17	67	73	0.918	40
14	Manchester City	42	13	12	17	83	73	1.137	38

Source: World Football
Rules for classification: 1) Points; 2) Goal average; 3) Goals scored
