= 1924–25 Chelsea F.C. season =

English football club season

Chelsea
1924–25 season
- Chairman: Claude Kirby
- Manager: David Calderhead
- Stadium: Stamford Bridge
- Second Division: 5th
- FA Cup: First round
- Top goalscorer: League: William Whitton (16); All: William Whitton (16)
- Highest home attendance: 42,000 vs Crystal Palace (27 September 1924)
- Lowest home attendance: 20,000 vs Barnsley (25 April 1925)
- Average home league attendance: 30,738
- Biggest win: 5–0 v Oldham Athletic (6 September 1924)
- Biggest defeat: 0–4 v Leicester City (1 September 1924); 0–4 v Stockport County (21 February 1925)
Home colours	Away colours

The 1924–25 season was Chelsea Football Club's sixteenth competitive season.

== Table ==
Pos	Team	Pld	W	D	L	GF	GA	GAv	Pts
3	Derby County	42	22	11	9	71	36	1.972	55
4	Portsmouth	42	15	18	9	58	50	1.160	48
5	Chelsea	42	16	15	11	51	37	1.378	47
6	Wolverhampton Wanderers	42	20	6	16	55	51	1.078	46
7	Southampton	42	13	18	11	40	36	1.111	44
