= 1920–21 Chelsea F.C. season =

English football club season

Chelsea
1920–21 season
- Chairman: Claude Kirby
- Manager: David Calderhead
- Stadium: Stamford Bridge
- First Division: 18th
- FA Cup: Quarter-finals
- Top goalscorer: League: Jack Cock (12); All: Jack Cock (15)
- Highest home attendance: 76,000 vs Tottenham Hotspur (16 October 1920)
- Lowest home attendance: 20,000 vs Blackburn Rovers (7 May 1921)
- Average home league attendance: 40,238
- Biggest win: 5–1 v Aston Villa (29 March 1921)
- Biggest defeat: 0–5 v Tottenham Hotspur (9 October 1920)
Home colours	Away colours

The 1920–21 season was Chelsea Football Club's twelfth competitive season.

== Table ==
Pos	Team	Pld	W	D	L	GF	GA	GAv	Pts
16	Preston North End	42	15	9	18	61	65	0.938	39
17	Huddersfield Town	42	15	9	18	42	49	0.857	39
18	Chelsea	42	13	13	16	48	58	0.828	39
19	Oldham Athletic	42	9	15	18	49	86	0.570	33
20	Sheffield United	42	6	18	18	42	68	0.618	30

Source: World Football
Rules for classification: 1) Points; 2) Goal average; 3) Goals scored
