= 1979–80 Chelsea F.C. season =

English football club season

Chelsea
1979–80 season
- Chairman: Brian Mears
- Manager: Danny Blanchflower (until 11 September); Geoff Hurst
- Stadium: Stamford Bridge
- Second Division: 4th
- FA Cup: Third round
- League Cup: Second round
- Top goalscorer: League: Clive Walker (13); All: Clive Walker and Mike Fillery (13)
- Highest home attendance: 32,281 vs Newcastle United (12 January 1980)
- Lowest home attendance: 14,112 vs Plymouth Argyle (4 September 1979)
- Average home league attendance: 22,923
- Biggest win: 4–0 v Newcastle United (12 January 1980)
- Biggest defeat: 1–5 v Birmingham City (11 March 1980)
Home colours	Away colours

The 1979–80 season was Chelsea Football Club's sixty-sixth competitive season.

== Table ==
Pos	Team	Pld	W	D	L	GF	GA	GD	Pts	Qualification or relegation
2	Sunderland (P)	42	21	12	9	69	42	+27	54	Promotion to the First Division
3	Birmingham City (P)	42	21	11	10	58	38	+20	53	Promotion to the First Division
4	Chelsea	42	23	7	12	66	52	+14	53	
5	Queens Park Rangers	42	18	13	11	75	53	+22	49	
6	Luton Town	42	16	17	9	66	45	+21	49	

Rules for classification: 1) Points; 2) Goal difference; 3) Goals scored
(P) Promoted
