= 1921–22 Chelsea F.C. season =

English football club season

Chelsea
1921–22 season
- Chairman: Claude Kirby
- Manager: David Calderhead
- Stadium: Stamford Bridge
- First Division: 9th
- FA Cup: First round
- Top goalscorer: League: Jack Cock (13); All: Jack Cock (13)
- Highest home attendance: 67,000 vs Middlesbrough (27 Dec 1921)
- Lowest home attendance: 20,000 vs Blackburn Rovers (7 May 1921)
- Average home league attendance: 39,074
- Biggest win: 4–1 v Burnley (29th Oct 1921); 4–1 v Aston Villa (17 April 1922)
- Biggest defeat: 0–5 v Burnley (22 Oct 1921)
Home colours	Away colours

The 1921–22 season was Chelsea Football Club's thirteenth competitive season.

== Table ==
Pos	Team	Pld	W	D	L	GF	GA	GAv	Pts
7	Newcastle United	42	18	10	14	59	45	1.311	46
8	Middlesbrough	42	16	14	12	79	69	1.145	46
9	Chelsea	42	17	12	13	40	43	0.930	46
10	Manchester City	42	18	9	15	65	70	0.929	45
11	Sheffield United	42	15	10	17	59	54	1.093	40

Source: World Football
Rules for classification: 1) Points; 2) Goal average; 3) Goals scored
