= 1937–38 Chelsea F.C. season =

English football club season

Chelsea
1937–38 season
- Chairman: Lt. Col Charles Chrisp
- Manager: Leslie Knighton
- Stadium: Stamford Bridge
- First Division: 10th
- FA Cup: Third round
- Top goalscorer: League: George Mills (13); All: George Mills (13)
- Highest home attendance: 75,952 vs Arsenal (9 October 1937)
- Lowest home attendance: 15,617 vs Grimsby Town (15 September 1937)
- Average home league attendance: 33,975
- Biggest win: 6–1 v Liverpool (28 August 1937)
- Biggest defeat: 0–4 v West Bromwich Albion (4 September 1937); 0–4 v Derby County (11 December 1937)
Home colours	Away colours

The 1937–38 season was Chelsea Football Club's twenty-ninth competitive season. Chelsea began the season brightly, and topped the table after a 2–1 win over Brentford in October 1937, but won only two of their next 21 league matches and ultimately finished 10th.

== Table ==
Pos	Team	Pld	W	D	L	GF	GA	GAv	Pts
8	Sunderland	42	14	16	12	55	57	0.965	44
9	Leeds United	42	14	15	13	64	69	0.928	43
10	Chelsea	42	14	13	15	65	65	1.000	41
11	Liverpool	42	15	11	16	65	71	0.915	41
12	Blackpool	42	16	8	18	61	66	0.924	40

Source: World Football
Rules for classification: 1) Points; 2) Goal average; 3) Goals scored
