= 1982–83 Chelsea F.C. season =

English football club season

Chelsea
1982–83 season
- Chairman: Ken Bates
- Manager: John Neal
- Stadium: Stamford Bridge
- Second Division: 18th
- FA Cup: Fourth round
- League Cup: Third round
- Top goalscorer: League: Mike Fillery (9); All: Mike Fillery (12)
- Highest home attendance: 29,797 vs Fulham (28 December 1982)
- Lowest home attendance: 6,677 vs Carlisle United (12 March 1983)
- Average home league attendance: 12,728
- Biggest win: 6–0 v Cambridge United (15 January 1983)
- Biggest defeat: 2–5 v Charlton Athletic (5 March 1983)
Home colours	Away colours

The 1982–83 season was Chelsea Football Club's sixty-ninth competitive season. Struggling on and off the pitch, Chelsea narrowly escaped relegation to the Third Division and ultimately finished 18th, their lowest ever position in the Football League.

== Table ==
Pos	Team	Pld	W	D	L	GF	GA	GD	Pts	Relegation
16	Middlesbrough	42	11	15	16	46	67	−21	48	
17	Charlton Athletic	42	13	9	20	63	86	−23	48	
18	Chelsea	42	11	14	17	51	61	−10	47	
19	Grimsby Town	42	12	11	19	45	70	−25	47	
20	Rotherham United (R)	42	10	15	17	45	68	−23	45	Relegation to the Third Division

Rules for classification: 1) Points; 2) Goal difference; 3) Goals scored
(R) Relegated
