= 1936–37 Chelsea F.C. season =

English football club season

Chelsea
1936–37 season
- Chairman: Charles Pratt
- Manager: Leslie Knighton
- Stadium: Stamford Bridge
- First Division: 13th
- FA Cup: Fourth round
- Top goalscorer: League: George Mills (22); All: George Mills (23)
- Highest home attendance: 64,463 vs Charlton Athletic (26 March 1937)
- Lowest home attendance: 13,225 vs Manchester City (3 February 1937)
- Average home league attendance: 32,461
- Biggest win: 4–0 v Everton (28 November 1936); 4–0 v Leeds United (16 January 1937)
- Biggest defeat: 1–4 v Arsenal (19 December 1936); 1–4 v Portsmouth (6 February 1937)
Home colours	Away colours

The 1936–37 season was Chelsea Football Club's twenty-eighth competitive season. In May and June, Chelsea took part in the invitational Tournoi international de l'Exposition Universelle de Paris and reached the final, where they lost to Italian champions Bologna.

== Table ==
Pos	Team	Pld	W	D	L	GF	GA	GAv	Pts
11	Birmingham	42	13	15	14	64	60	1.067	41
12	Grimsby Town	42	17	7	18	86	81	1.062	41
13	Chelsea	42	14	13	15	52	55	0.945	41
14	Preston North End	42	14	13	15	56	67	0.836	41
15	Huddersfield Town	42	12	15	15	62	64	0.969	39

Source: World Football
Rules for classification: 1) Points; 2) Goal average; 3) Goals scored
