= 1935–36 Chelsea F.C. season =

English football club season

Chelsea
1935–36 season
- Chairman: Claude Kirby; Charles Pratt
- Manager: Leslie Knighton
- Stadium: Stamford Bridge
- First Division: 8th
- FA Cup: Fifth round
- Top goalscorer: League: Joe Bambrick (15); All: Joe Bambrick (19)
- Highest home attendance: 82,905 vs Arsenal (12 October 1935)
- Lowest home attendance: 13,225 vs West Bromwich Albion (11 March 1936)
- Average home league attendance: 34,977
- Biggest win: 5–1 v Blackburn Rovers (2 May 1936)
- Biggest defeat: 1–5 v Everton (19 October 1935)
Home colours	Away colours

The 1935–36 season was Chelsea Football Club's twenty-seventh competitive season. In October 1935, Claude Kirby died. He had been Chelsea chairman since the club's foundation in 1905 and was succeeded by Charles Pratt, Sr. Also in October, a crowd of 82,905 attended Chelsea's First Division match against Arsenal at Stamford Bridge, setting a club record which still stands.

== Table ==
Pos	Team	Pld	W	D	L	GF	GA	GAv	Pts
6	Arsenal	42	15	15	12	78	48	1.625	45
7	Preston North End	42	18	8	16	67	64	1.047	44
8	Chelsea	42	15	13	14	65	72	0.903	43
9	Manchester City	42	17	8	17	68	60	1.133	42
10	Portsmouth	42	17	8	17	54	67	0.806	42

Source: World Football
Rules for classification: 1) Points; 2) Goal average; 3) Goals scored
