= 1923–24 Chelsea F.C. season =

English football club season

Chelsea
1923–24 season
- Chairman: Claude Kirby
- Manager: David Calderhead
- Stadium: Stamford Bridge
- First Division: 21st
- FA Cup: Second round
- Top goalscorer: League: Andy Wilson (5); All: Andy Wilson (6)
- Highest home attendance: 50,000 vs West Ham United (20 October 1923)
- Lowest home attendance: 15,000 vs Notts County (9 February 1924)
- Average home league attendance: 32,048
- Biggest win: 4–1 v Sunderland (26 April 1924)
- Biggest defeat: 0–6 v Notts County (9 February 1924)
| Home colours | Away colours |

The 1923–24 season was Chelsea Football Club's fifteenth competitive season. The club finished 21st in the First Division and were relegated.

== Table ==
| Pos | Team | Pld | W | D | L | GF | GA | GAv | Pts | Relegation |
|---|---|---|---|---|---|---|---|---|---|---|
| 18 | Preston North End | 42 | 12 | 10 | 20 | 52 | 67 | 0.776 | 34 | |
| 19 | Arsenal | 42 | 12 | 9 | 21 | 40 | 63 | 0.635 | 33 | |
| 20 | Nottingham Forest | 42 | 10 | 12 | 20 | 42 | 64 | 0.656 | 32 | |
| 21 | Chelsea (R) | 42 | 9 | 14 | 19 | 31 | 53 | 0.585 | 32 | Relegation to the Second Division |
| 22 | Middlesbrough (R) | 42 | 7 | 8 | 27 | 37 | 60 | 0.617 | 22 | Relegation to the Second Division |

Source: World Football
Rules for classification: 1) Points; 2) Goal average; 3) Goals scored
(R) Relegated
