= 1906–07 Chelsea F.C. season =

English football club season

Chelsea
1906–07 season
- Owner: Gus Mears
- Chairman: Claude Kirby
- Manager: John Tait Robertson (until Nov 1906); William Lewis
- Stadium: Stamford Bridge
- Second Division: 2nd
- FA Cup: First Round
- Top goalscorer: League: George Hilsdon (27); All: George Hilsdon (27)
- Highest home attendance: 48,000 vs Hull City (29 Mar 1907)
- Lowest home attendance: 10,000 vs Bradford City (15 September 1906)
- Average home league attendance: 17,453
- Biggest win: 9–2 v Glossop North End (1 September 1906)
- Biggest defeat: 3–6 v Bradford City (19 March 1907)
Home colours	Away colours

The 1906–1907 season was Chelsea Football Club's second competitive season and second year in existence. The club finished as runners-up in the Second Division to secure promotion to the top-flight.

== Table ==
Pos	Team	Pld	W	D	L	GF	GA	GAv	Pts	Promotion or relegation
1	Nottingham Forest (C, P)	38	28	4	6	74	36	2.056	60	Promotion to the First Division
2	Chelsea (P)	38	26	5	7	80	34	2.353	57	Promotion to the First Division
3	Leicester Fosse	38	20	8	10	62	39	1.590	48	
4	West Bromwich Albion	38	21	5	12	83	45	1.844	47	
5	Bradford City	38	21	5	12	70	53	1.321	47	

(C) Champions; (P) Promoted
