= William Whitton =

English footballer (1899–1983)

William Whitton (9 July 1899 – 21 August 1983) was an English footballer who played for Chelsea and Tottenham Hotspur. A striker, Whitton played for Chelsea from 1923 to 1926. His best season at Chelsea was in the 1924–25 season, when he was the club's top scorer with 16 goals, which included a run of seven goals in two matches.
