= 1980–81 Chelsea F.C. season =

English football club season

Chelsea
1980–81 season
- Chairman: Brian Mears
- Manager: Geoff Hurst (until 30 April); Bobby Gould (caretaker)
- Stadium: Stamford Bridge
- Second Division: 12th
- FA Cup: Third round
- League Cup: Second round
- Top goalscorer: League: Colin Lee (15); All: Colin Lee (16)
- Highest home attendance: 32,669 vs West Ham United (6 September 1980)
- Lowest home attendance: 11,569 vs Cardiff City (4 April 1981)
- Average home league attendance: 17,897
- Biggest win: 6–0 v Newcastle United (25 October 1980)
- Biggest defeat: 0–4 v West Ham United (14 February 1981)
| Home colours | Away colours |

The 1980–81 season was Chelsea Football Club's sixty-seventh competitive season.

== Table ==
| Pos | Team | Pld | W | D | L | GF | GA | GD | Pts |
|---|---|---|---|---|---|---|---|---|---|
| 10 | Sheffield Wednesday | 42 | 17 | 8 | 17 | 53 | 51 | +2 | 42 |
| 11 | Newcastle United | 42 | 14 | 14 | 14 | 30 | 45 | −15 | 42 |
| 12 | Chelsea | 42 | 14 | 12 | 16 | 46 | 41 | +5 | 40 |
| 13 | Cambridge United | 42 | 17 | 6 | 19 | 53 | 65 | −12 | 40 |
| 14 | Shrewsbury Town | 42 | 11 | 17 | 14 | 46 | 47 | −1 | 39 |

Rules for classification: 1) Points; 2) Goal difference; 3) Goals scored
