= 1945–46 Chelsea F.C. season =

English football club season

Chelsea
1945–46 season
- Chairman: Joe Mears
- Manager: Billy Birrell
- Stadium: Stamford Bridge
- First Division: N/A
- FA Cup: Fifth round
- Top goalscorer: League: All: Five players (1)
- Highest home attendance: 69,987 vs West Ham United (26 January 1946)
- Lowest home attendance: 39,678 vs Leicester City (5 January 1946)
- Average home league attendance
| Home colours | Away colours |

The 1945–46 season was Chelsea Football Club's thirty-second competitive season. It saw the first competitive football in England since the end of the Second World War, the FA Cup; Chelsea reached the fifth round. The Football League did not resume until the following season, so Chelsea continued to play in the regional Football League South; Chelsea finished 10th in the 22-team league. In November, the club also played a high-profile friendly match against FC Dynamo Moscow of the Soviet Union.
