= David Calderhead Jr. =

Scottish footballer (1889–1965)

Personal information
- Date of birth: 25 October 1889
- Place of birth: Dumfries, Scotland
- Date of death: 15 January 1965 (aged 75)

Youth career
- –: Lincoln City
- 1907–1911: Chelsea

Senior career*
| Years | Team | Apps | (Gls) |
| 1911–1914 | Chelsea | 34 | (1) |
| – | Leicester Fosse | ? | (?) |

Managerial career
- 1921–1924: Lincoln City
- * Club domestic league appearances and goals

David Calderhead Jr. (25 October 1889 – 15 January 1965) was a Scottish professional football player and manager.

== Career ==
Calderhead played for Lincoln City, Chelsea and Leicester Fosse.

Calderhead later managed Lincoln City from April 1921 to May 1924.

== Personal life ==
His father was David Calderhead, who was also a football player and manager, notable for managing Chelsea for 26 years.
