= 1938–39 Chelsea F.C. season =

English football club season

Chelsea
1938–39 season
- Chairman: Lt. Col Charles Chrisp
- Manager: Leslie Knighton
- Stadium: Stamford Bridge
- First Division: 20th
- FA Cup: Quarter-finals
- Top goalscorer: League: Joe Payne (17); All: Joe Payne (19)
- Highest home attendance: 69,987 vs Fulham (21 January 1939)
- Lowest home attendance: 12,971 vs Blackpool (15 March 1939)
- Average home league attendance: 30,953
- Biggest win: 5–1 v Grimsby Town (11 March 1939)
- Biggest defeat: 1–6 v Stoke City (4 February 1939)
Home colours	Away colours

The 1938–39 season was Chelsea Football Club's thirtieth competitive season. It was the last completed season of competitive football in England before the outbreak of the Second World War. The club finished the season 20th in The First Division, one point above the relegation zone. They also reached the quarter-finals of the FA Cup, a run which ended with a 1–0 home loss to Grimsby Town.

== Table ==
Pos	Team	Pld	W	D	L	GF	GA	GAv	Pts	Relegation
1	Everton (C)	42	27	5	10	88	52	1.692	59	
2	Wolverhampton Wanderers	42	22	11	9	88	39	2.256	55	
3	Charlton Athletic	42	22	6	14	75	59	1.271	50	
4	Middlesbrough	42	20	9	13	93	74	1.257	49	
5	Arsenal	42	19	9	14	55	41	1.341	47	
6	Derby County	42	19	8	15	66	55	1.200	46	
7	Stoke City	42	17	12	13	71	68	1.044	46	
8	Bolton Wanderers	42	15	15	12	67	58	1.155	45	
9	Preston North End	42	16	12	14	63	59	1.068	44	
10	Grimsby Town	42	16	11	15	61	69	0.884	43	
11	Liverpool	42	14	14	14	62	63	0.984	42	
12	Aston Villa	42	16	9	17	71	60	1.183	41	
13	Leeds United	42	16	9	17	59	67	0.881	41	
14	Manchester United	42	11	16	15	57	65	0.877	38	
15	Blackpool	42	12	14	16	56	68	0.824	38	
16	Sunderland	42	13	12	17	54	67	0.806	38	
17	Portsmouth	42	12	13	17	47	70	0.671	37	
18	Brentford	42	14	8	20	53	74	0.716	36	
19	Huddersfield Town	42	12	11	19	58	64	0.906	35	
20	Chelsea	42	12	9	21	64	80	0.800	33	
21	Birmingham (R)	42	12	8	22	62	84	0.738	32	Relegation to the Second Division
22	Leicester City (R)	42	9	11	22	48	82	0.585	29	Relegation to the Second Division

Source: World Football
Rules for classification: 1) Points; 2) Goal average; 3) Goals scored
(C) Champions; (R) Relegated
