= 1981–82 Chelsea F.C. season =

English football club season

Chelsea
1981–82 season
- Chairman: Viscount Chelsea; Ken Bates
- Manager: John Neal
- Stadium: Stamford Bridge
- Second Division: 12th
- FA Cup: Quarter-finals
- League Cup: Third round
- Top goalscorer: League: Clive Walker (16); All: Clive Walker (17)
- Highest home attendance: 42,557 vs Tottenham Hotspur (6 March 1982)
- Lowest home attendance: 6,009 vs Orient (5 May 1982)
- Average home league attendance: 13,133
- Biggest win: 4–1 (two matches)
- Biggest defeat: 0–6 v Rotherham United (31 October 1981)
Home colours	Away colours

The 1981–82 season was Chelsea Football Club's sixty-eighth competitive season.

== Season summary ==
Chelsea began the season with a new manager, John Neal, Geoff Hurst having been sacked at the end of the previous season. Neal's arrival brought no immediate upturn in the club's fortunes, and they finished 12th in the Second Division for the second successive year. The highlight of the season was a run to the quarter-finals of the FA Cup (the club's first appearance in a cup quarter-final since 1973), which included a 2–0 win over reigning European champions Liverpool.

Off the pitch, the club was purchased by businessman Ken Bates for £1 in April 1982.

== Table ==
Pos	Team	Pld	W	D	L	GF	GA	GD	Pts
10	Blackburn Rovers	42	16	11	15	47	43	+4	59
11	Oldham Athletic	42	15	14	13	50	51	−1	59
12	Chelsea	42	15	12	15	60	60	0	57
13	Charlton Athletic	42	13	12	17	50	65	−15	51
14	Cambridge United	42	13	9	20	48	53	−5	48

Rules for classification: 1) Points; 2) Goal difference; 3) Goals scored
