= Harry Ford (footballer, born 1893) =

English footballer (1893–1963)

Personal information
- Full name: Henry Thomas Ford
- Date of birth: 6 February 1893
- Place of birth: Fulham, England
- Date of death: 1963 (aged 69–70)
- Height: 5 ft 7 1/2 in (1.71 m)
- Positions: Outside right; inside right

Senior career*
Years	Team	Apps	(Gls)
1910–1911	Fulham Amateurs		
1911–1912	Tunbridge Wells Rangers		
1912–1924	Chelsea	248	(46)
- * Club domestic league appearances and goals

Henry Thomas Ford (6 February 1893 – 1963) was an English professional footballer who made over 240 appearances in the Football League for Chelsea as an outside right.

== Career ==
An outside right, Ford began his career with non-League clubs Fulham Amateurs and Tunbridge Wells Rangers. He transferred to First Division club Chelsea in April 1912 for a fee of £50, plus a further £50 if he played 10 first team matches. Ford was a part of the Chelsea team which reached the 1915 FA Cup Final and he played his final match for the club in November 1923, by which time he had made 247 appearances and scored 46 goals.

== Personal life ==
In February 1916, 18 months after the outbreak of the First World War, Ford joined the Royal Flying Corps and trained as a rigger. He held the rank of air mechanic and was discharged in March 1919.

== Career statistics ==
Appearances and goals by club, season and competition
Club	Season	League			FA Cup		Total	
Club	Season	Division	Apps	Goals	Apps	Goals	Apps	Goals
Chelsea	1912–13	First Division	29	9	3	0	32	9
Chelsea	1913–14	First Division	37	9	2	0	39	9
Chelsea	1914–15	First Division	33	3	8	2	41	5
Chelsea	1919–20	First Division	30	3	5	2	35	5
Chelsea	1920–21	First Division	23	4	4	0	27	4
Chelsea	1921–22	First Division	29	3	1	1	30	4
Chelsea	1922–23	First Division	36	10	3	0	39	10
Chelsea	1923–24	First Division	4	0	0	0	4	0
Career total			221	41	26	5	247	46

== Honours ==
Chelsea

- FA Cup runner-up: 1914–15
