= Dick Spence =

English footballer

Personal information
- Full name: Richard Spence
- Date of birth: 18 July 1908
- Place of birth: Hoyland, England
- Date of death: 12 March 1983 (aged 74)
- Height: 5 ft 5 in (1.65 m)
- Position: Winger

Senior career*
Years	Team	Apps	(Gls)
1932–1935	Barnsley	64	(25)
1934–1948	Chelsea	221	(63)
Total		285	(88)

International career
1936	England	2	(0)
- * Club domestic league appearances and goals

Richard Spence (18 July 1908 – 12 March 1983) was an English footballer who played in the Football League for Barnsley and Chelsea.

== Career ==
Born and raised in Yorkshire, Spence began his professional club career with Barnsley, before joining Chelsea in October 1934 for £5000. Standing at only 5 ft 7 in (1.70 m) tall, he was a tricky and nimble winger who could play on either flank, and also chipped in with important goals. He scored 19 goals in his debut season for the club - no Chelsea winger has scored more in a season - and was one of the club's reliable players at a time when many of its more high-profile stars were unreliable. He played in 221 games for Chelsea, scoring 66 goals.

After serving in the Metropolitan Police during World War II, he resumed his playing career with Chelsea (making him one of only two players to play for Chelsea both before and after the War). He had the distinction of being Chelsea's oldest ever player, playing his final first-class match for the club against Bolton Wanderers in September 1947 at the age of 39 years, 57 days. Following that, he joined the Chelsea coaching staff, on which he remained for the next two decades, and was an important part in the new youth set-up at the club, helping to unearth such talents as Jimmy Greaves, Terry Venables and Bobby Tambling.

He was twice capped for England, against Austria and Belgium, both in 1936. The presence of Stanley Matthews in the side, along with other talented wingers, was a key factor in Spence not winning more England caps.

He died in March 1983, aged 74.
