= Mike Fillery =

English footballer

Personal information
- Full name: Michael Christopher Fillery
- Date of birth: 17 September 1960 (age 66)
- Place of birth: Mitcham, London, England
- Height: 5 ft 10 in (1.78 m)
- Position: Midfielder

Youth career
- –1978: Chelsea

Senior career*
Years	Team	Apps	(Gls)
1978–1983	Chelsea	181	(41)
1983–1987	Queens Park Rangers	97	(9)
1987–1990	Portsmouth	67	(6)
1990–1992	Oldham Athletic	2	(0)
1990	→ Millwall (loan)	1	(0)
1991	→ Torquay United (loan)	4	(0)
1992–199?	Crawley Town		

International career
1976	England Schoolboys	8	(6)
1978	England Youth	3	(0)
- * Club domestic league appearances and goals

Michael Christopher Fillery (born 17 September 1960 in Mitcham, Surrey, UK) is an English former professional footballer who played for Chelsea, Queens Park Rangers, Portsmouth, Oldham Athletic, Millwall and Torquay United as a midfielder during the 1970s, 1980s and 1990s. Fillery was Chelsea player of the year in 1982.

== Career ==
Mike Fillery signed professional forms for Chelsea in August 1978. This stylish midfielder played many fine games for Chelsea, though sometimes inconsistent, during a difficult and troubled period for Chelsea Football Club. Mike Fillery was Chelsea Player of the Year in 1982 and also won the Chelsea Official Supporter's Club award in the same year. He was transferred to Queens Park Rangers nearby in West London in August 1983 for £200,000.

Fillery was the last Chelsea youth team product to score 10 or more goals in back-to-back seasons until Tammy Abraham achieved the feat during the 2020–21 season.

== Honours ==
Individual

- Chelsea Player of the Year: 1981–82
