= George Mills (footballer) =

English footballer (1908–1970)

Personal information
- Full name: George Robert Mills
- Date of birth: 29 December 1908
- Place of birth: Deptford, England
- Date of death: 15 July 1970 (aged 61)
- Place of death: Torquay, England
- Height: 6 ft 0 in (1.83 m)
- Position: Striker

Youth career
- Bromley

Senior career*
Years	Team	Apps	(Gls)
1929–1943	Chelsea	220	(125)

International career
1937	England	3	(3)
- * Club domestic league appearances and goals

George Robert Mills (born 29 December 1908 in Deptford, died 15 July 1970) was an English footballer, principally for Chelsea.

He signed for Chelsea as an amateur in 1929 from Bromley and stayed at the club for the rest of his career. He was a prolific goal scorer in his time there, notching 125 goals in 239 games. Despite often being overlooked by more glamorous, but less reliable, forwards such as Hughie Gallacher and Joe Bambrick, he remained loyal to the club.

In his debut season, Mills scored 14 goals in 20 games for Chelsea, helping them achieve promotion to the First Division. His best season was in 1936–37, when he scored 22 goals in 32 appearances, which earned him an England call-up. He won three international caps for England and scored three goals, all of which came in a 5–1 win against Northern Ireland on 23 October 1937.

Mills was the first Chelsea player to score over 100 league goals, a feat only five others have since matched, and is the club's 8th highest goal scorer of all time. He is also the last Chelsea player to have scored a hat-trick against Liverpool, which came in a 6–1 win in August 1937. Upon retiring he became a coach at Chelsea.

He later worked in the City of London for a printing company. He died while on holiday in Torquay in 1970.
