= Clive Walker (footballer, born 1957) =

English footballer (born 1957)

Personal information
- Date of birth: 25 June 1957 (age 69)
- Place of birth: Oxford, England
- Height: 5 ft 8 in (1.73 m)
- Position: Winger

Youth career
- Chelsea

Senior career*
| Years | Team | Apps | (Gls) |
| 1976–1984 | Chelsea | 198 | (60) |
| 1979 | → Fort Lauderdale Strikers (loan) | 22 | (9) |
| 1984–1985 | Sunderland | 50 | (10) |
| 1985–1987 | Queens Park Rangers | 21 | (1) |
| 1987–1990 | Fulham | 109 | (29) |
| 1990–1993 | Brighton & Hove Albion | 106 | (8) |
| 1993–1997 | Woking | 203 | (91) |
| 1997–1999 | Cheltenham Town | 56 | (13) |
- Molesey
| Total | | 743 | (212) |

International career
| 1972 | England Schoolboys | 2 | (1) |

Managerial career
- Molesey
- * Club domestic league appearances and goals

Clive Walker (born 25 June 1957) is an English retired professional footballer who played as a winger. His playing career spanned some 1,000 league and cup games for Chelsea, Sunderland, Fulham and Brighton & Hove Albion before enjoying a renaissance in the Conference with Woking and Cheltenham Town.

== Playing career ==
=== Chelsea ===
Walker was born in Oxford, England. He was an old-fashioned winger with pace who used to terrorise full backs on a weekly basis. He began his career with Chelsea, playing in the same side as the likes of Ray Wilkins. He first broke into the Chelsea team during the 1977–78 season, but they were in the Second Division for most of his time there. He nonetheless played a big role in several key matches for the club in this period.

He put in Man of the Match performances against European champions Liverpool in the FA Cup in 1978 and 1982 as the Blues pulled off two famous upsets; he scored twice in a 4–2 win in 1978 and set up a late clincher for Colin Lee in a 2–0 win in 1982. With Chelsea facing relegation to the Third Division in 1982–83, and with it potential financial meltdown, Walker also scored a late winner against fellow strugglers Bolton Wanderers in the penultimate game of the season to ensure the club's survival. In 1979, Chelsea sent him on loan to the Fort Lauderdale Strikers of the North American Soccer League.

=== Sunderland ===
Walker left Chelsea at the end of the 1983–84 season following a contract dispute, and signed for Sunderland. He returned to haunt his old side the following season in the League Cup, when the teams were drawn together in the semi-finals. In the second leg at Stamford Bridge, Walker inspired Sunderland to a 3–2 win, giving them a 5–2 aggregate lead, which provoked a near-riot; at one point a Chelsea fan entered the pitch and chased Walker. In the final at Wembley, however, Sunderland lost 1–0 to Norwich City, with Walker missing a penalty when he hit his shot against the post.

== Coaching career ==
After retiring from professional football, Walker became player-manager of Molesey.

He currently works as an analyst for the radio station BBC London 94.9 and is a co-director of Sporting Experience with Jason Cundy.

He also makes appearances on Chelsea TV.

== Records ==
Walker currently holds the record for the oldest player to play for his last club, Cheltenham Town.

== Honours ==
Sunderland

- Football League Cup runner-up: 1984–85

Woking

- FA Trophy: 1993–94, 1994–95, 1996–97

Cheltenham Town

- Football Conference: 1998–99
- FA Trophy: 1997–98
