= Bob Thomson =

English footballer (1890–1971)

Personal information
- Full name: Robert Thomson
- Date of birth: 29 December 1890
- Place of birth: Croydon, England
- Date of death: 1971 (aged 80–81)
- Place of death: Croydon, England
- Height: 5 ft 6 in (1.68 m)
- Position: Centre forward

Senior career*
Years	Team	Apps	(Gls)
–1911	Croydon Common		
1911–1922	Chelsea	83	(23)
- * Club domestic league appearances and goals

Robert Thomson (29 December 1890 – 1971) was an English footballer who played during the early 20th century, mainly prior to World War I.

Playing as a forward, Thomson carved out a career in the game despite having only one eye, resulting from a childhood accident with a firework. When asked how he dealt with a ball coming to him on his blind side, Bob would answer: 'I just shut my other eye and play from memory.'

He started out with his local side Croydon Common before joining west Londoners Chelsea in September 1911. His most successful season with Chelsea came in 1914–15, when his six goals in eight FA Cup games helped his team reach the final, where they lost to Sheffield United.

When competitive football was abandoned in Britain in 1915, Thomson continued to turn out for Chelsea in unofficial wartime matches, scoring 100 goals in three seasons 1915–17. He played twice more for the club in FA cup when hostilities ended.

He made a total of 95 appearances and scored 30 goals.

He signed for Charlton Athletic in 1921.

== Honours ==
Chelsea

- FA Cup runner-up: 1914–15
