= David Calderhead =

Scottish footballer and manager

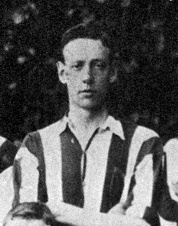
- Calderhead with Notts County in 1894

Personal information
- Full name: David Calderhead
- Date of birth: 19 June 1864
- Place of birth: Hurlford, Scotland
- Date of death: 9 January 1938 (aged 73)
- Place of death: London, England
- Position: Centre half

Youth career
- Wishaw Swifts
- Wishaw Thistle

Senior career*
Years	Team	Apps	(Gls)
1881–1889	Queen of the South Wanderers		
1889–1900	Notts County	278	(12)
1900–1901	Lincoln City	2	(0)

International career
1889	Scotland	1	(0)
1891	Football League XI	1	(0)

Managerial career
- 1900–1907: Lincoln City
- 1907–1933: Chelsea
- * Club domestic league appearances and goals

David Calderhead (19 June 1864 – 9 January 1938) was a Scottish football player and manager. Calderhead played for Queen of the South Wanderers, Notts County and Lincoln City. He won the FA Cup with Notts County in 1894 and was capped once for Scotland, in 1889. He then became a manager, working for Lincoln City (1900–1907) and Chelsea (1907–1933).

== Playing career ==
Calderhead was a centre half and played for various clubs, including Dumfries team Queen of the South Wanderers (not to be confused with Queen of the South, formed in 1919). He won one Scotland cap, in a 7–0 win against Ireland at the first Ibrox Park in the British Home Championship in March 1889; this attracted Notts County.

With Notts County he played in two FA Cup finals: the Blackburn Rovers side of Thomas Mitchell were 3–1 winners in 1891, but Calderhead got his hands on the trophy in 1894 after a 4–1 victory over Bolton Wanderers.

== Management career ==
He then moved into management, taking over at Lincoln City in 1900. In leading his side to a shock replayed win over Chelsea in the first round of 1906–07 FA Cup, he impressed the west London club's board enough for them to appoint him manager later that year. Norrie Fairgray made the same move in the same year to play for Calderhead at both clubs.

Calderhead was Chelsea's first full-time secretary-manager and spent almost 26 years at the club, making him the club's longest-serving manager. Chelsea were relegated in 1909–10 and promoted back to the First Division in 1911–12. Calderhead took Chelsea to their first FA Cup final, in 1915, but in a match overshadowed by the First World War they were beaten by Sheffield United 0–3 at Old Trafford. During the war, Chelsea won the unofficial London Combination twice, as well as the War Fund Cup.

The 1919–20 season was Chelsea's most successful under Calderhead, finishing 3rd in the First Division and reaching the FA Cup semi-finals, where they lost to Aston Villa. The club were relegated again in 1923–24 and, after a succession of near-misses, the side of Willie Ferguson, Tommy Law and Andy Wilson were promoted again in 1929–30. 1931–32 brought a further FA Cup semi final. Tommy Lang inspired Newcastle to a 2-goal lead and despite Gallacher pulling a goal back, Newcastle progressed to the final.

Calderhead was notoriously shy of the media, earning the nickname "The Sphinx of Stamford Bridge". Nevertheless, The Times described him as "one of the managers who started the fashion of paying huge transfer fees and was responsible for bringing many celebrated players to Stamford Bridge, including [Hughie] Gallacher and [Alex] Jackson." Gallacher, Jackson and Alec Cheyne were purchased for a combined £30,000 in the summer of 1930. In March 1910, in an (unsuccessful) bid to stave off relegation, Calderhead's Chelsea spent the then-considerable sum of £3000 on new players. Despite the big spending on glamorous players, the club failed to win a major trophy during Calderhead's tenure.

Calderhead holds the record at Chelsea for managing games – 966. He left the job in June 1933 to be replaced by Leslie Knighton. Calderhead died five years after leaving Chelsea in London at the age of 73.

His son, also called David, played for Chelsea while his father was manager and later took charge of Lincoln City.

== Managerial statistics ==
Managerial record by team and tenure
Team	From	To	Record				
Team	From	To	G	W	D	L	Win %
Lincoln City	1 August 1900	1 August 1907	256	89	53	114	34.77
Chelsea	1 August 1907	8 May 1933	966	385	239	342	39.86
Total			1,222	474	292	456	38.79

== Honours ==
=== Player ===
Notts County

- FA Cup
  - Winner: 1894
  - Runner-up: 1891

=== Manager ===
Chelsea

- FA Cup runner up : 1915
