= Claude Kirby =

English football executive

William Claude Kirby (7 February 1868 – 24 October 1935) was a British businessman, amateur sportsman and association football executive.

Kirby was the first chairman of Chelsea Football Club, assuming the position shortly after its foundation in March 1905. He kept the job until his death in 1935. He died from an aggressive form of cancer. He lived in Fulham at 22 Wardo Avenue.
