= Bartram =

Bartram is an English surname. Notable people with the surname include:

- Clint Bartram (born 1988), Australian footballer
- Ed Bartram (1938–2019), Canadian artist
- Graham Bartram (born 1963), British vexillologist
- James Bartram (1827–1905), English-born Australian pioneer
- Jimmy Bartram (1911–1987), English footballer
- John Bartram (politician) (c. 1650–1697) English-born politician
- John Bartram (1699–1777), American botanist
- John Bartram (athlete) (1925–2014), Australian athlete
- Kenny Bartram (born 1978), American motocross rider
- Per Bartram (1944–2025), Danish footballer
- Richard Bartram (1749–1826), English merchant in Rome
- Sam Bartram (1914–1981), English footballer
- Tracy Bartram (born 1959), Australian comedian
- Vince Bartram (born 1968), English footballer
- Walter Bartram (1893–1971), German politician
- William Bartram (Pennsylvania politician) (1674–1711) English-born politician
- William Bartram (North Carolina politician) (1711–1770) American scientist and politician
- William Bartram (1739–1823), American naturalist and writer

== See also ==
- Bartrim (disambiguation)
- Bertram (name)
