= History of Chelsea F.C. =

The History of Chelsea F.C. spans the period from 1905 to the present day:

- History of Chelsea F.C. (1905–1952)
- History of Chelsea F.C. (1952–1983)
- History of Chelsea F.C. (1983–2003)
- History of Chelsea F.C. (2003–2022)
- History of Chelsea F.C. (2022–present)

For a season-by-season account of Chelsea's history, see List of Chelsea F.C. seasons.

== See also ==
- Chelsea F.C. § History
