= Kersley =

Kersley may refer to:

== People ==
- George Kersley, Sr. (1817-1906), a Western Australian pioneer
- Jean-Kersley Gardenne, a retired Mauritian pole vaulter
- Kersley Appou, a football player
- Kersley Levrai, a football player
- Leo Kersley, a British dancer and teacher
- Tom Kersley, an English cricketer

== Fictional Characters ==
- Mr. Kersley, a minor character from the book Mona the Vampire

== Places ==
- Kearsley (archaically known as Kersley), a town in Greater Manchester, England
- Kersley, British Columbia, a small Canadian rural community
- Kersley Elementary School, an elementary school in British Columbia

== Other ==
- Clifton and Kersley Coal Company, a historic coal mining company
