= History of Chelsea F.C. (1905–1952) =

History of an English football club

This article documents the history of Chelsea Football Club, an English association football team based in Fulham, West London. For a general overview of the club, see Chelsea F.C.

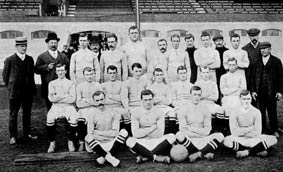
The first Chelsea team in September 1905

In 1904, Gus Mears acquired the Stamford Bridge athletics stadium in Fulham with the aim of turning it into a football ground. An offer to lease it to nearby Fulham F.C. was turned down, so Mears opted to found his own club to use the stadium. As there was already a team named Fulham in the borough, the name of the adjacent borough of Chelsea was chosen for the new club; names like Kensington FC, Stamford Bridge FC and London FC were also considered. Chelsea F.C. was founded on 10 March 1905 at The Rising Sun pub (now The Butcher's Hook), opposite the present-day main entrance to the ground on Fulham Road, and were elected to the Football League shortly afterwards.

Chelsea won promotion to the First Division in their second season, and yo-yoed between the First and Second Divisions in their early years. They reached the 1915 FA Cup Final, where they lost to Sheffield United at Old Trafford, and finished third in the First Division in 1920, the club's best league campaign to that point. Chelsea had a reputation for signing star players and attracted large crowds. The club had the highest average attendance in English football in ten separate seasons including 1907–08, 1909–10, 1911–12, 1912–13, 1913–14 and 1919–20. They were FA Cup semi-finalists in 1920 and 1932 and remained in the First Division throughout the 1930s, but success eluded the club in the inter-war years.

== Pre-1905 ==
In 1896, Henry Augustus "Gus" Mears, football enthusiast and businessman, along with his brother, Joseph Mears, purchased the Stamford Bridge Athletics Ground in Fulham, West London, with the intention of staging first-class football matches there. They had to wait until 1904 to buy the freehold, when the previous owner died. They failed to persuade Fulham Football Club to adopt the ground as their home after a dispute over the rent, so Mears considered selling to the Great Western Railway Company, who wanted to use the land as a coal-dumping yard. Mears' colleague Fred Parker was trying unsuccessfully to dissuade him. Parker later recounted what happened next:

Feeling sad that the old ground would be no more, I walked slowly by his [Mears'] side when his dog, coming up from behind unobserved, bit me so severely through my cycling stockings as to draw blood freely. On telling the owner "Your damned dog has bitten me, look!" and showing him the blood, instead of expressing concern he casually observed, "Scotch terrier; always bites before he speaks."

The utter absurdity of the remark struck me as so genuinely funny that although hopping about on one foot and feeling blood trickling down, I had to laugh heartily and tell him he was the "coolest fish" I'd ever met.

A minute later he surprised me by slapping me on the shoulder and saying, "You took that bite damned well, most men would have kicked up hell about it. Look here, I'll stand on you; never mind the others. Go to the chemists and get that bite seen to and meet me here at nine tomorrow morning and we'll get busy".

Thus on a whim, Mears changed his mind and decided to take Parker's advice to instead found his own football club to occupy Stamford Bridge.

== Early years (1905–15) ==
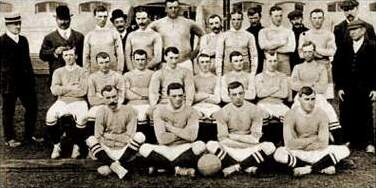
Chelsea's squad in 1905

Chelsea Football Club were founded on 10 March 1905. at The Rising Sun pub, (now The Butcher's Hook) opposite today's main entrance to the ground on the Fulham Road. Since there was already a team named Fulham in the borough, the name of the adjacent borough, the Metropolitan Borough of Chelsea, was settled on after London FC, Kensington FC and Stamford Bridge FC had been rejected. Blue shirts were adopted by Mears, after the racing colors of Lord Chelsea, along with white shorts and dark blue socks.

Chelsea initially considering joining the Southern League, but were rejected following objections from Fulham and Tottenham Hotspur, so they instead applied for admission to the Football League. Their candidacy was endorsed at the Football League AGM on 29 May 1905; a speech by Parker was particularly important, emphasising the new club's financial stability, its impressive new stadium and marquee players such as William "Fatty" Foulke, the 22 stone goalkeeper who had won a league title and two FA Cups with Sheffield United.

Twenty-eight-year-old Scottish international half-back John Robertson was hired as player-manager. The club began with established players recruited from other teams; along with Foulke, Chelsea signed forwards Jimmy Windridge and Bob McRoberts from Small Heath, and Frank Pearson from Manchester City. Chelsea's first league match took place away at Stockport County on 2 September 1905. They lost the game 1–0. Their first home match was against Liverpool in a friendly. They won 4–0. Robertson also scored Chelsea's first competitive goal, coming in a 1–0 win against Blackpool.

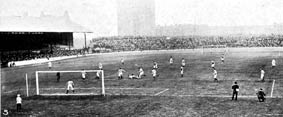
Chelsea beat West Brom at Stamford Bridge in September 1905.

Chelsea finished a respectable 3rd in the Second Division in their first season, but Robertson steadily saw his position undermined by board room interference. He lost the power to select the team in November 1905, and by January 1907 he had left for Glossop. Club secretary William Lewis took temporary charge and led the team to promotion at the end of the season, thanks largely to the goals of Windridge and George "Gatling Gun" Hilsdon. The latter was the first of many prolific strikers/forwards to play for Chelsea; he scored five goals on his debut and 27 in the promotion season en route to becoming the first player to score 100 goals for the club.

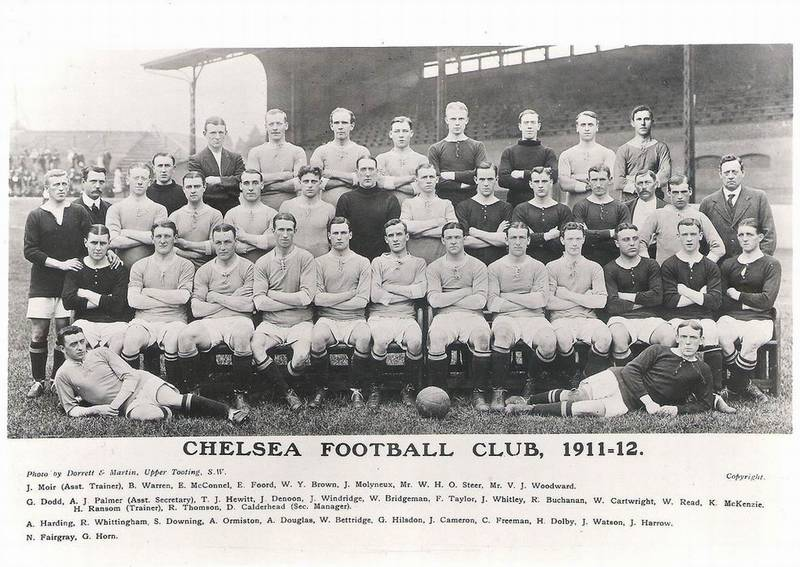
Chelsea's complete roster for the 1911–12 season

Lewis was succeeded by David Calderhead, who was to manage Chelsea for the next 26 years. The club's early seasons produced little success, and they yo-yoed between the First and Second divisions. They were relegated in 1909–10, promoted in 1911–12 and finished 19th in 1914–15, the final competitive season before football in England was suspended owing to World War I. The club would normally have been relegated, but when regular football resumed in 1919 the league was expanded to 22 teams and Chelsea were re-elected to the First Division.

In 1915, under the shadow of the First World War, Chelsea reached their first FA Cup final, the so-called "Khaki" cup final, owing to the large number of uniformed soldiers in attendance. The match against Sheffield United was played in a sombre atmosphere and staged at Old Trafford in Manchester to avoid disruption in London. Chelsea, minus their top amateur striker, Vivian Woodward, who had sportingly insisted that the team who reached the final ought to keep their places, were seemingly unnerved by the occasion and outplayed for much of the match. Goalkeeper Jim Molyneux's mistake allowed United to score before half-time, but the Blues held out until the final six minutes, when their opponents added two more to win 3–0.

In spite of their checkered fortunes, Chelsea became one of the best-supported teams in the country, with fans attracted by the team's reputation for playing entertaining attacking football and for signing star players, notably half-back Ben Warren and striker Bob Whittingham. The club had the highest average attendance in English football in 1907–08, 1909–10, 1911–12, 1912–13 and 1913–14. A crowd of 67,000 attended a league game against Manchester United on Good Friday 1906, a then-record for a football match in London. 55,000 attended the first-ever London derby in the top division, against Woolwich Arsenal, a record for a First Division match. 77,952 attended a fourth round FA Cup tie against Swindon on 13 April 1911.

== Between the wars ==
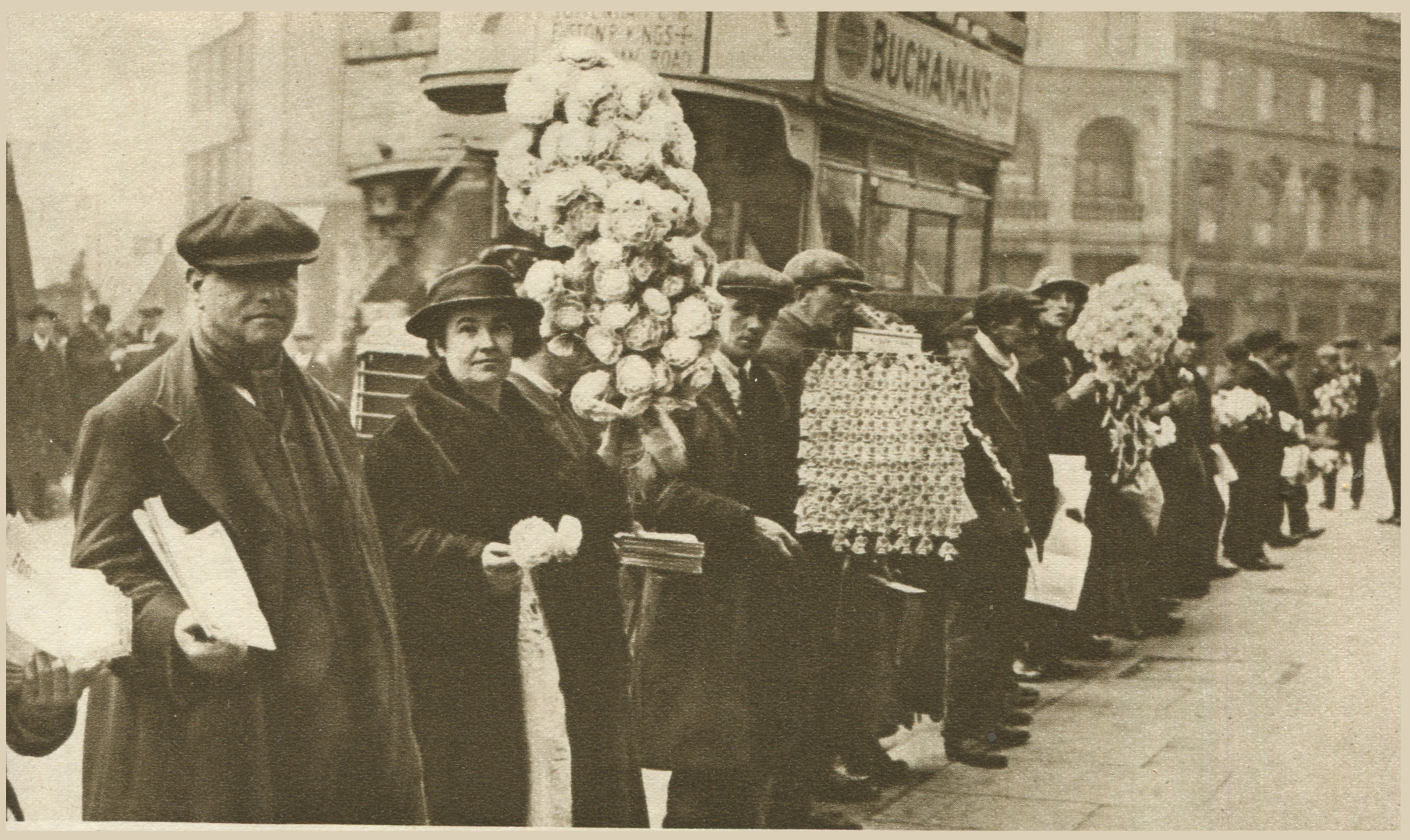
Hawkers selling rosettes and other favours in the Chelsea colours, Walham Green, c. 1927

1919–20, the first full season following the war, was Chelsea's most successful up to that point. Led by 24 goal striker Jack Cock, the club's latest glamour signing, they finished third in the league – then the highest league finish for a London club – and reached the FA Cup semi-finals, only to be denied by eventual winners Aston Villa, which saw them miss out on a chance to play in the final at Stamford Bridge. The club were relegated again in 1923–24 and in four of the next five seasons were to narrowly miss out on promotion, finishing fifth, third, fourth and third. With long serving mainstays including Willie Ferguson, Tommy Law and Andy Wilson, Chelsea finally reached the First Division again in 1929–30, where the club was to remain for the next 32 years.

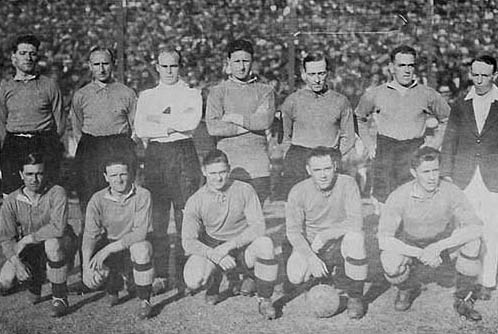
The Chelsea FC team that toured in Argentina in 1929

To capitalise on the 1930 promotion, the club spent £25,000 ($49,000) on three big-name players: Scots Hughie Gallacher, Alex Jackson and Alec Cheyne. Gallacher in particular was one of the biggest talents of his era, known for his goalscoring and for having captained Newcastle to a championship in 1926–27. He and Jackson had also been members of the Wembley Wizards team (as had Law), the Scotland team which beat England 5–1 at Wembley in 1928.

However, though the team occasionally clicked, such as in a 6–2 win over Manchester United and a 5–0 win over Sunderland, none of the trio had the desired impact. Gallacher was Chelsea's top scorer in each of his four seasons, scoring 81 goals in total, but his time in west London was hindered by his personal troubles and punctuated by long suspensions for indiscipline, including a two-month ban for swearing at a referee. Jackson and Cheyne struggled to settle at the club and were unable re-capture their previous achievements. The trio did not make 300 appearances between them and by 1936 all had left at a significant financial loss to the club. Their disappointment epitomised Chelsea's flaws throughout the decade, whereby performances and results rarely matched the calibre of players at the club. Money was spent, but some feel it was too often spent on inappropriate players, especially forwards, while the defence remained neglected.

The FA Cup was to be the closest the club came to silverware. In 1932, the team secured impressive wins over Liverpool and Sheffield Wednesday, and were drawn against Newcastle United in the semi-finals. Tommy Lang inspired Newcastle to a 2–0 lead, before Gallacher pulled one back for Chelsea. The Blues laid siege to the United goal in the second half, but were unable to make a breakthrough and the Geordies went on to lift the trophy.

Calderhead stepped down in 1933 and was replaced by Leslie Knighton, but the appointment saw little change in Chelsea's fortunes. At different times during the decade the club had on its books such players as Tommy Law, Sam Weaver, Sid Bishop, Harry Burgess, Dick Spence and Joe Bambrick, all established internationals, yet their highest league finish in the decade was eighth. Ironically, two of the club's most reliable players during the decade cost them nothing: goalkeeper Vic Woodley, who was to win 19 consecutive caps for England, and centre-forward George Mills, the first player to score 100 league goals for Chelsea. They avoided relegation by two points in 1932–33 and 1933–34, and by one point in 1938–39. Another promising cup run in 1939, which included wins over Arsenal and Sheffield Wednesday, petered out with a home loss to Grimsby Town in the quarter-finals.

The club continued to be one of the country's best-supported teams. The visit of Arsenal on 12 October 1935 attracted a crowd of 82,905 to Stamford Bridge, which remains a club record and the second highest ever attendance at an English league match. Ultimately, The massive amount of Chelsea fans could not celebrate a victory at Stamford Bridge as the match ended in a 1-1 draw. Joe Bambrick scored early on on the second half putting Chelsea up 1-0. Sadly Arsenals of almost 50,000 attended Gallacher and Jackson's home debuts. In 1939, with the club having come no closer to on-field success, Knighton stepped down. He was succeeded by Scotsman and former Queens Park Rangers manager, Billy Birrell.

In 1937, Chelsea competed in the "Arts et Techniques dans la Vie moderne" tournament in Paris against some of the biggest clubs of the time, Austria Wien, Bologna and Slavia Prague, thus becoming one of the first English clubs to participate in an international tournament. Chelsea reached the final of the tournament, where they lost to Italian champions Bologna.

During World War II, Chelsea club lost many star players.

== The war, Dynamo and the new youth system (1940–52) ==
Birrell was appointed Chelsea manager shortly before the outbreak of the Second World War. Three games into the 1939–40 season, first class football was abandoned in Britain for the duration of the conflict, meaning that all wartime results are only regarded as unofficial. Chelsea competed in a series of regional competitions and, like every other club, saw their squad severely depleted by the war effort (only two members of Chelsea's 1938–39 team ever played for them again). The club thus fielded a series of "guest" players, most notably Matt Busby, Walter Winterbottom and Eddie Hapgood. They also competed in the Football League War Cup, during which they made their Wembley debut, losing 1–3 to Charlton Athletic in the 1944 final, and beating Millwall 2–0 a year later in front of crowds of over 80,000. After the latter match, John Harris became the first Chelsea captain to lift a trophy at Wembley, receiving the cup from King George VI.

In October 1945, with the war having just ended, the English football authorities sought a way to celebrate the return of the peacetime game. As part of a goodwill gesture, it was announced that Dynamo Moscow, reigning champions of the Soviet Union, would tour the United Kingdom and play several home teams, including Chelsea. The match took place on 13 November at Stamford Bridge with Chelsea wearing an unfamiliar red strip due to a clash with Dynamo's blue kit. Before kick-off, the Dynamo players presented a bouquet of flowers to their opposite number. The Russian team surprised many observers with their talent and tenacity by fighting back from 0–2 and 2–3 down to earn a 3–3 draw. An estimated crowd of over 100,000 people attended the match, with thousands entering the ground illegally. This crowd is the highest ever recorded at Stamford Bridge. Spectators watched from numerous obscure places, including many on the dog track and on the top of stands.

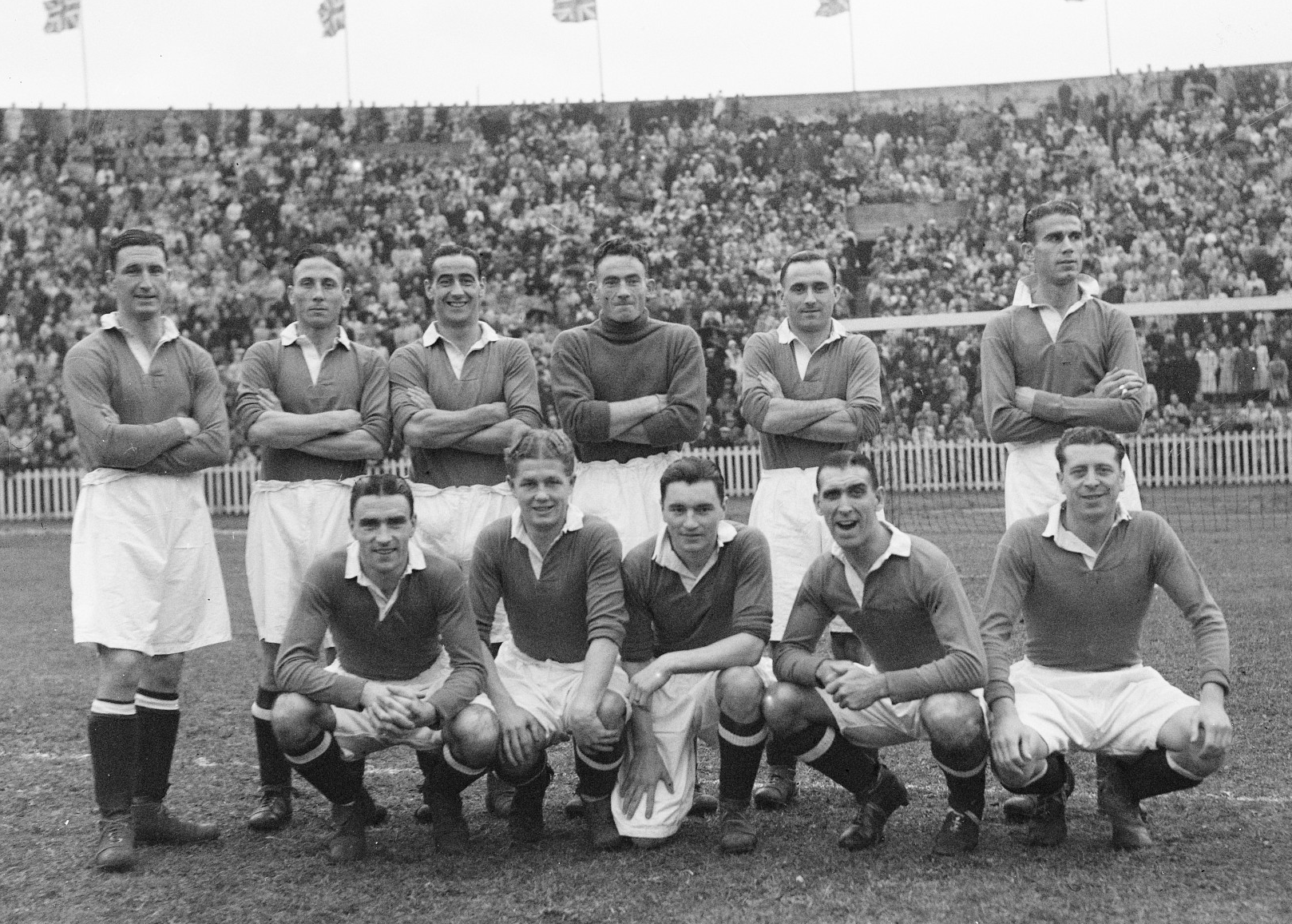
The Chelsea FC team in November 1947

Following the war, Chelsea again spent big, and again bought three big-name forwards, this time Tommy Lawton, Len Goulden and Tommy Walker, for around £22,000. The trio provided both goals and entertainment – Lawton set a new club record by scoring 26 goals in 34 league games in 1946–47 – but Chelsea finished 15th that season and never finished above 13th under Birrell. After a falling out with Birrell, Lawton was sold to Notts County for £20,000; his replacement was Roy Bentley, signed from Newcastle United for £11,500 in 1948.

1951 saw Chelsea enjoy another run in the FA Cup. After beating Manchester United 2–0 in a pulsating quarter-final, they were drawn to face London rivals Arsenal at White Hart Lane. Two goals from Bentley put Chelsea in control, but a freak goal from Arsenal (Chelsea's goalkeeper misjudged a corner and punched it into his own net) just before half-time turned the game. Arsenal equalised 15 minutes from full-time and then won the replay 1–0.

A year later, Chelsea seemed destined for relegation: with four games remaining, they were six points behind, at the bottom of the table, and without a win in fourteen matches. After unexpectedly winning the first three, Chelsea went into their final match needing to beat Bolton Wanderers and hoping for the right result between fellow relegation candidates Everton and Sheffield Wednesday. Chelsea won 4–0 and Wednesday beat Everton 6–0, thus ensuring Chelsea's survival on goal average by 0.044 of a goal. In 1952, Chelsea again faced Arsenal in the FA Cup semi-finals and after a 1–1 tie in the first match, lost the replay 3–0. Birrell resigned shortly afterwards.

Birrell's biggest contribution to Chelsea was off the field. In a bid to counter the spiraling cost of transfer fees in football, he oversaw the development of an extensive new youth and scouting programme, headed by ex-players Dickie Foss, Dick Spence and Jimmy Thompson, which would ultimately see the club produce its own players. The policy would provide the core of Chelsea's first team for the next three decades in particular, producing such players as Jimmy Greaves, Bobby Smith, Peter Osgood, Peter Bonetti, Ray Wilkins, Ron Harris, Bobby Tambling, Alan Hudson, Terry Venables and John Hollins.
