= Bartlam =

Bartlam is a surname. Notable people with the surname include:

- Dorothy Bartlam (1907–1991), English actress
- John Bartlam (1735–1781), British/American pottery manufacturer
- Lilly Bartlam (born 2006), Canadian child actress

== See also ==
- Bartram
