= George Smith (footballer, born 1915) =

English footballer, coach, and manager

Personal information
- Full name: George Caspar Smith
- Date of birth: 23 April 1915
- Place of birth: Bromley-by-Bow, England
- Date of death: 31 October 1983 (aged 68)
- Place of death: Bodmin, England
- Position: Centre half

Youth career
- 1937–1938: Bexleyheath & Welling

Senior career*
Years	Team	Apps	(Gls)
1938–1945	Charlton Athletic	1	(0)
1945–1947	Brentford	41	(1)
1947–1949	Queens Park Rangers	75	(1)
1949–1950	Ipswich Town	8	(0)
1950–1951	Chelmsford City		

International career
1945	England (Wartime)	1	(0)

Managerial career
- 1950–1951: Chelmsford City
- 1951–1952: Redhill
- 1952–1955: Eastbourne United
- 1956–1958: Sutton United
- 1958–1960: Crystal Palace
- 1961–1970: Portsmouth
- * Club domestic league appearances and goals

George Caspar Smith (23 April 1915 – 31 October 1983) was an English footballer, coach, and manager.

He appeared in one wartime international for England (against Wales in May 1945) for which caps were not awarded although the England teams then were probably stronger than some pre-war sides. He also played in armed services representative sides which were Great Britain elevens in all but name. According to George Allison, Arsenal's manager, wartime football was 'better in quality than pre-war League football'.

After retiring from playing, Smith had a successful career as both an F.A. coach and manager. His league win ratios at Crystal Palace and Portsmouth FC were 43% and 36% respectively.

== Early playing career ==
Smith's career began at Hackney Schools in east London where he had grown up. He joined the army as a young man and was stationed in Syria and Palestine in the mid-nineteen thirties. On returning to England, he was bought out of the army by Jimmy Seed and, in 1936–37, began to feature for Bexleyheath & Welling in the Kent League. After promotion with Charlton from the third to the second division in 1935, Seed had arranged that Bexleyheath & Welling would become the nursery club of Charlton Athletic and the amateur team was also referred to as 'Charlton A'.

=== Charlton Athletic ===
Under Seed's management, Charlton surprised the football world prior to World War II by achieving successive promotions and becoming one of the strongest teams in the English 1st Division. They were runners-up in 1936-7 and then finished fourth and third respectively before the war caused league football to be abandoned for six years. Smith signed professional papers on 5 August 1938 with a salary of £5 per week and a £10 signing-on payment. His contract was renewed in 1939 at £6 per week until May 1940 with the provision of '£1 extra per week when playing in the first team'. He made the first XI at the end of the 1938–9 season when his form attracted considerable attention. This was the final game of that season at home on 6 May to Preston North End; a game which Charlton won 3–1. The outbreak of the war meant that he only made 1 full league appearance before regular football fixtures were halted.

== War years ==
George Smith enlisted in the APTC on 3 November 1939; listing his professions as footballer and PT Instructor. He spent much of the early period of the Second World War as a PT instructor at Aldershot as well as on troop ships. During this period, he continued to represent Charlton Athletic as well as being a wartime playing guest for Tottenham Hotspur and Chelsea among others.

On 15 April 1944, he played in Charlton's 3–1 win against Chelsea in the Football League South War Cup Final in front of a crowd of 85,000 at Wembley. In that 1944 final, the players received National Savings Certificates instead of medals. US General Dwight D. Eisenhower was presented to the teams and afterwards was quoted as saying, "I started cheering for the Blues but after the Reds took the lead, well I had to cheer for them instead."

He was discharged from Victoria Barracks, Windsor, at the rank of sergeant major, with exemplary military conduct on 8 December 1945. His discharge papers read 'an excellent physical training instructor and an international footballer: an honest, sober and trustworthy man with a most cheerful disposition'.

=== Army & FA representative XIs ===
During the last years of the war he also played in several strong Army and FA representative sides alongside players such as Frank Swift and Matt Busby, both of whom were friends from their days at Aldershot Army camp. Although these matches were not recorded as official internationals, the players wore England shirts and received notification of their selection on English Football Association headed paper.

'In March 1945, an FA XI played two games in Belgium, against the national side and against the Diables Rouge, the Belgian parachute brigade. The full party was: Bert Williams (Walsall), Laurie Scott (Arsenal), Bert Sproston (Manchester City), George Hardwick (Middlesbrough), Matt Busby (Liverpool), George Smith and 'Sailor' Brown (Charlton Athletic), Stanley Matthews and Neil Franklin (Stoke City), Tommy Lawton and Joe Mercer (Everton), Stan Mortensen (Blackpool), Leslie Smith (Brentford) and Maurice Edelston (Reading). In Bruges, the FA team received a rapturous welcome from thousands of British troops – some of whom had torn down a wooden fence to gain admission – and went on to win 8–1.' Rippon, Anton (2005). Gas Masks for Goal Posts: Football in Britain During the Second World War. Sutton Publishing Ltd. ISBN 0-7509-4030-1.

=== Wartime International ===
George Smith made his one wartime international appearance against Wales at Ninian Park, Cardiff on 5 May 1945. England won 3–2 with a hat-trick by Raich Carter. He had also been reserve for England against Scotland at Hampden on 14 April after returning from the FA XI trip to Belgium.

== Later playing career ==
=== Brentford F.C. ===
After the war, in November 1945, he was placed on the Charlton transfer list, at his own request, and on 19th of that month, moved to Brentford for a £3,000 transfer fee. The reason was given as 'domestic' in some newspapers and as 'a disagreement on certain issues' by Jimmy Seed.

He made 41 league appearances for the Bees before moving to Queens Park Rangers in May 1947. The move was precipitated by Brentford's 'Put Football First' policy to ban any outside employment which cut across 9–12 morning training sessions. Brentford manager, Harry Curtis, stated that the 'usual team spirit was lacking' as players missed training and team talks. Smith worked as a physical education teacher at St. Joseph's College, Beulah Hill and was unwilling to meet the club's requirements. He was joined in this decision by other players including Scotland right-half, Archie Macaulay, and Len Townsend, the club's centre-forward and leading scorer who also left.

=== Queens Park Rangers ===
Brentford transferred Smith to QPR for a fee reputed to be a record for a third division club which according to press reports of the time 'the Rangers do not regret spending one penny of'. Smith described it as a 'good change for me. Brentford was not a happy club'. He captained Queens Park Rangers to a Division III South Champions medal in May 1948. QPR also reached the 6th round of F.A. Cup in his 'happiest season in football, not only because it was so successful but because of great team spirit shown by all the players of the club'. In total, he played 75 league games for them.

In August 1949, prior to Smith's departure from Loftus Road, the QPR boss, David Mangnall, wrote to Smith, 'you deserve most of the credit for our promotion, also for pulling us through last season, we noticed that you kept cool and calm about it all, and as a result our worry never entered the dressing room'.

== End of playing career & early coaching ==
On 26 September 1949, he joined Ipswich Town where he made 8 league appearances and became the club's assistant manager and coach until his resignation in January 1950. This signalled the start of his own managerial career. He moved to Chelmsford City in August 1950, then Redhill in July 1951, and Eastbourne United from 1952 to 1955. This was a successful period for the club as, under Smith's guidance, they were twice County League champions, and runners-up once between 1953 and 1956.

=== F.A. Youth coach ===
During this period he became the first paid F.A. Youth Squad manager of the England national team attending and participating in coaching sessions at Lilleshall.

From September 1955 until February 1956 he was coach at Sheffield United.

== Management ==
=== Sutton United ===
In 1956, Sutton United were looking for a new manager and long-serving club president (at that time, chairman), Andrew Letts recalls that Smith was recommended to the club by Tottenham manager, Arthur Rowe. He was appointed after interview on 26 May 1956 to take up duties on 1 July and steered the club through one of its happiest periods. In his second season of 1957–58, the club won both the Athenian league and the London Senior Cup; the former for the final time in the club's history and the latter for the first time.

Although committed to a 4-year contract, success brought an offer of professional management from Crystal Palace and Sutton agreed to let Smith go, eventually replacing him with Malcolm Allison. Andrew Letts wrote of George Smith in the Sutton United Football Club 1898–1973 – 75th Anniversary Souvenir Book:

'We had two very happy years, under inspired leadership, and had been left with a great example. I understand how the players felt for he lifted me, just as he lifted the game and them, to a different level, and I, like them shall always be grateful to him.'

=== Crystal Palace ===
In July 1958, he took over as manager of Crystal Palace in the newly formed fourth division. When he took the Crystal Palace job he said he would resign if he did not achieve promotion within two years. He did not and subsequently kept his word; resigning in April 1960. However, he left a team good enough to win promotion for his successor.

George Smith returned to Sheffield United as coach from April 1960 until April 1961.

=== Portsmouth FC ===
He then began his decade as Portsmouth FC manager from April 1961 until April 1970. When he joined them, Portsmouth was in the third division but he won promotion to the Second Division by winning the Third Division Championship in 1962.

Field-Marshal the Viscount Montgomery of Alamein, was the honorary chairman of Portsmouth FC having begun to support them during World War II due to the proximity of his headquarters. In private correspondence dated 25 April 1962, he wrote to Smith:

'I congratulate you very much on getting Portsmouth out of the Third Division – which was completely a wrong place for a famous team. While the players all did their stuff, the major credit goes to you.'

Throughout the sixties, on a limited budget, he kept Portsmouth on a sound financial footing in the second division. In 1970, he became Portsmouth FC general manager until his retirement from football in 1973.

== Retirement ==
He moved to Bodmin in Cornwall for the last years of his life and died in 1983.

== Bibliography ==
- Rippon, A (2005) Gas Masks for Goal Posts: Football in Britain During the Second World War ISBN 0-7509-4030-1
- Rollin, J (1985) Soccer At War 1939–45 ISBN 0-00-218023-5 Willow Books, Collins
- Sutton United Football Club 1898–1973 – 75th Anniversary Souvenir Book
- Charles Buchan's Football Monthly, February 1961 edition
- Seed, J (1958) The Jimmy Seed Story The Sportsman's Book Club, London
