= 1944 Football League War Cup South final =

1944 Football League War Cup South Final
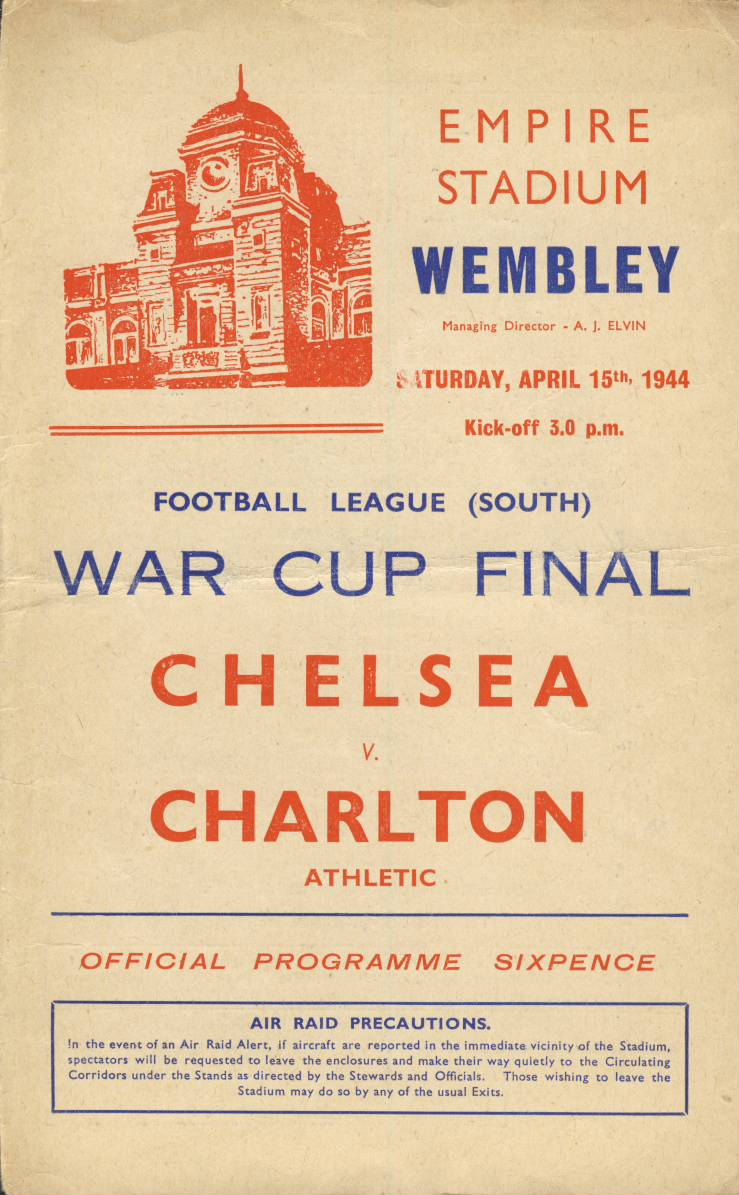
- Official programme
- Event: 1944 Football League War Cup
Chelsea	Charlton Athletic
1	3
- Date: 15 April 1944
- Venue: Wembley Stadium, London
- Attendance: 85,000

The 1944 Football League War Cup South Final was the final of the southern section of Football League War Cup, an unofficial cup competition held in England during the Second World War as a replacement for the suspended FA Cup. The match took place at Wembley Stadium on 15 April 1944 and was won by Charlton Athletic, who beat Chelsea 3–1. Charlton later contested a play-off against the winners of the equivalent North final, Aston Villa.

== Match summary ==
Chelsea took an early lead with a penalty from Joe Payne. Charlton equalised through Charlie Revell and took the lead on 36 minutes when a defensive mix-up enabled Don Welsh to score. Revell scored Charlton's third a minute later to put the game beyond Chelsea's reach. Dwight D. Eisenhower, Supreme Commander of the Allied forces, presented the cup to victorious captain Welsh. The match produced a record gate of £26,000, of which £12,000 was recouped by the Government in Entertainment Tax.

== Match details ==
15 April 1944

Chelsea	1–3	Charlton Athletic
Payne (pen.)		Revell; Welsh

Wembley Stadium, London
Attendance: 85,000

Chelsea
Charlton Athletic

1	(England) Vic Woodley
2	(England) George Hardwick
3	(England) Eric Westwood
4	(Scotland) William Russell
5	(Scotland) John Harris
6	(England) Dick Foss
7	(Wales) Llew Ashcroft
8	(Scotland) Jimmy Bowie
9	(England) Joe Payne
10	(Scotland) Willie Fagan
11	(England) Charlie Mitten
Manager:
(Scotland) Billy Birrell

1	(England) Sam Bartram
2	(England) John Shreeve
3	(England) Joe Jobling
4	(England) George Smith
5	(Scotland) Jackie Oakes
6	(England) Allenby Chilton
7	(England) George Robinson
8	(England) Sailor Brown
9	(England) Charlie Revell
10	(England) Don Welsh
11	(Scotland) Chris Duffy
Manager:
(England) Jimmy Seed
