= Bartrim =

Bartrim may refer to:

- Hidcote Bartrim, hamlet and former civil parish in Gloucestershire
- Wayne Bartrim (born 1971), Australian rugby league footballer

== See also ==
- Bartram, surname
- Bertram (disambiguation)
