= Richard Bartram =

Early 19th century English Consul of Civita Vecchia

Richard Bartram (1749–1826) was the English Consul of Civita Vecchia in the early 19th century and involved in the saving of the Jacobite Royal Papers.

== Early life ==
Bartram was born in Trimingham, Norfolk, in 1749 the only son of Captain Richard Bartram of Great Yarmouth Norfolk. His tombstone records:

HERE LIE THE REMAINS OF

RICHARD BARTRAM MERCHANT WHO DIED IN THE HOPE OF A BLESSED IMMORTALITY ON THE 24 OF FEBRUARY 1826 WAS IN HIS 76 YEAR HE THE ONLY SON OF CAPTAIN RICHARD BARTRAM OF GREAT YARMOUTH IN THE COUNTY OF NORFOLK BY WHOM HE WAS SETTLED EARLY IN LIFE AT CIVITA VECCHIA HAVING NO CHILDREN HIS NEPHEW CUBITT ENGALL BARTRAM BECAME THE OBJECT OF HIS CARE AND BOUNTY WHO CONSCIOUS OF THE RESPECT DUE TO HIS BENEVOLENT RELATION GRATEFULLY DEDICATES THIS MONUMENT

TO HIS MEMORY

Bartram however did have a sister and later his niece and nephew tried to challenge his will which left everything to his relative Cubbitt Engall Bartram. Bartram refers to Cubbitt Engall Bartram as his nephew but is actually more distantly related. Bartram is a first cousin of Cubbitt's grandfather William Bartram (born 1744).

There is interesting correspondence between the Reverend William Gunn of Smallburgh Norfolk and the Bartrams in Civita Vecchia. Cubitt first arrived in Civita Vecchia in 1820 to join his relative Richard Bartram and became his heir. The Norfolk Record Office archive on William Gunn states:

...Next there is a run of letters from Richard Bartram (c 1749-1826), a Norfolk man who had settled as a merchant at Civitavecchia. Gunn met him first during a flying visit to Rome in 1785, and then again in 1792-1793. Bartram was responsible for shipping to Gunn the many copies of works of art and books which he ordered during his visit, but the correspondence continued for the rest of Bartram's life. His letters contain an account of affairs in Italy during the occupation by the French, and its aftermath. Gunn helped him to select the Bartram cousin most suitable to become a merchant, and this young man, Cubitt Bartram, became his partner, and then his heir, and continued the correspondence from Civitavecchia into the 1830s...

Cubbitt Bartram was also joined by his brother John Bartram in Civita Vecchia in the business.

== Jacobite connections ==
Bartram was visited by his Jacobite relative Sir Robert Bartram (1761–1844) of Norfolk (a grandson of Sir James Alexander Wright Bt the Last Royal Governor of Georgia) in 1795. Robert Bartram was an uncle of Cubbitt Engall Bartram. Bartram introduced Robert to his future wife Anna Modin (Maiden/Maidman), an Italian Jew who was a granddaughter of Prince Henry Stuart and his Jewish mistress (before he entered the Church). Robert's sons Sir James Bartram of Metton and William John Bartram of Aylmerton were also Jacobites (connected with Sir Henry Drummond and Joseph Wolff) who also visited Richard Bartram and their cousins Cubbitt and John Bartram in Civita Vecchia.

== Royal adventure and imprisonment ==
In "Calendar of the Stuart papers belonging to His Majesty the King, preserved at Windsor Castle" it tells the story of how the Stuart papers were brought to Windsor Castle and the role that Bartram played in this adventure.

...The cases of papers purchased from Waters were in 1805, at Sir J. C. Hippisley's request, deposited by the Treasurer General of the English Benedictines in the custody of Mr. Richard Bartram, who was acting as English Consul at Civita Vecchia, to await an opportunity of transmitting them to England. Sir J. C. Hippisley had been authorized by the Prince of Wales to concert with Lord Nelson such measures as best promised to secure the papers, and after Lord Nelson's death Lord Collingwood wrote to Sir John, in Jan., 1806, that he would endeavour to carry out the plan which had been settled with him. He accordingly, early in July, 1806, sent a brig of war under Capt. Raitt to Civita Vecchia, but unfortunately, twelve days before, the French had unexpectedly occupied the town and the brig's boats were not allowed to land. Another attempt in September by Capt. Raitt to communicate with Mr. Bartram was also unsuccessful. Two days after the occupation of the town Mr. Bartram was arrested and thrown into a dungeon, with threats of being shot, if he did not disclose any property he might have or knew to be at Civita Vecchia belonging to England or to Englishmen. He had fortunately secreted the papers previously, and for several years preserved them safely, though with the greatest personal risk to himself. Mr. Paul Macpherson, the Principal of the Scots College at Rome, frequently communicated with Mr. Bartram with the view of removing the papers from Civita Vecchia, and they were ultimately delivered to the order of Sir J. C. Hippisley, brought to Mr. Bartam by Mr. Macpherson. (Foreign Office Papers, Italian States, No. 8.) A Mr. Bonelli, to whom Sir John had been authorized by the Prince of Wales to confide the commission for obtaining the papers, succeeded, with Mr. Macpherson's assistance, though with considerable risk, in shipping them to Leghorn, from which they were embarked in a Tunisian vessel to Tunis. They were forwarded from thence to Malta, and finally arrived in England in or about 1810, and were placed in the library of Carlton House..."

Bartram died in 1826 in Civita Vechhia leaving his business to his adopted heir and relative Cubbitt Engall Bartram (born 1798 Brumstead Norfolk) the son of James Wright Bartram and Elizabeth Engall of Brumstead Norfolk.
