= Sam Bartram =

English footballer (1914–1981)

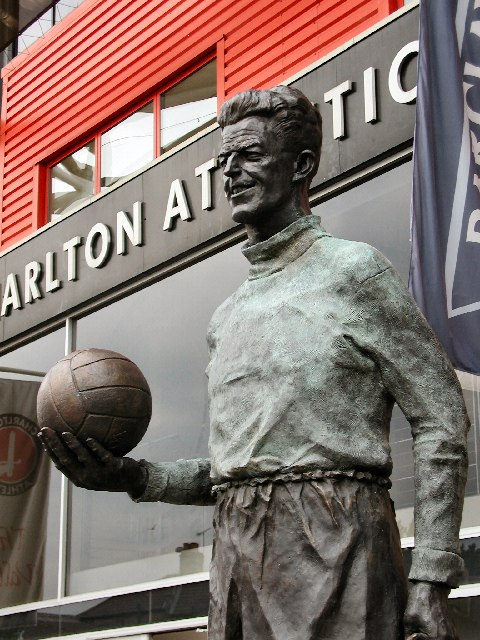
- Statue of Bartram, 2005

Personal information
- Full name: Samuel Bartram
- Date of birth: 22 January 1914
- Place of birth: Jarrow, County Durham, England
- Date of death: 17 July 1981 (aged 67)
- Place of death: Harpenden, Hertfordshire, England
- Height: 1.78 m (5 ft 10 in)
- Position: Goalkeeper

Senior career*
Years	Team	Apps	(Gls)
- Boldon Villa
1934–1956	Charlton Athletic	579	(0)

International career
	England (wartime)	3	(0)

Managerial career
- 1956–1960: York City
- 1960–1962: Luton Town
- * Club domestic league appearances and goals

Samuel Bartram (22 January 1914 – 17 July 1981) was an English professional footballer and manager. He played as a goalkeeper and holds the record for most appearances for Charlton Athletic, his only club at the professional level.

== Career ==
After school, Sam Bartram became a miner and played as either a centre-forward or wing-half in non-League football in the North-East of England. As a teenager, he had an unsuccessful trial with Reading. When his local village club, Boldon Villa, were without a goalkeeper for a cup final in 1934, Bartram took over in goal. A scout from Charlton Athletic, Anthony Seed, was watching the game, and Bartram played so well that Seed recommended him to his brother, Jimmy Seed, the Charlton Secretary Manager. Anthony Seed was Charlton's chief scout in the north east.

In his first three years with Charlton, the club rose from Division Three to runners-up in the top division. He played in goal for the Addicks for 22 years, ignoring unofficial guest appearances elsewhere during wartime, and was never dropped from the team until he retired in 1956. He is considered one of Charlton's greatest players, and their finest goalkeeper. He played in four finals at Wembley between 1943 and 1947 (the FA Cup Final in 1946 and 1947, and the Southern Football League War Cup in 1944 and 1945), winning the FA Cup in 1947. During the semi-final against Newcastle United at Elland Road on 29 March 1947, Bartram was suffering from food poisoning, so played with a hot poultice on his stomach.

During the Second World War, Bartram guested for York City, Liverpool and West Ham United. He also became a physical training instructor.

Although Bartram toured Australia with an England XI in 1951 and played for the England B team, he was burdened with the unwanted praise of 'the finest goalkeeper never to play for England', as the England national team had both Frank Swift and Ted Ditchburn jostling for the goalkeeper position.

On 6 March 1954, he set an English Football League record with 500 League appearances. He was runner-up in the 1954 Footballer of the Year vote at the age of 40.

Bartram is the oldest player to have played for Charlton, playing until he was 42, and in 1956, after a record 623 appearances, he left to manage York City. In 1960, he became manager of Luton Town, prior to a career as a football columnist for The People. He spent his final years in Harpenden.

=== Fog incident ===
Bartram was involved in a well reported incident on 25 December 1937 when thick fog closed in on a game he was playing against Chelsea at Stamford Bridge:

"Soon after the kick-off," he wrote in his autobiography, "[fog] began to thicken rapidly at the far end, travelling past Vic Woodley in the Chelsea goal and rolling steadily towards me. The referee stopped the game, and then, as visibility became clearer, restarted it. We were on top at this time, and I saw fewer and fewer figures as we attacked steadily."

The game went unusually silent but Sam remained at his post, peering into the thickening fog from the edge of the penalty area. And he wondered why the play was not coming his way.

"After a long time," he wrote, 'a figure loomed out of the curtain of fog in front of me. It was a policeman, and he gaped at me incredulously. "What on earth are you doing here?" he gasped. "The game was stopped a quarter of an hour ago. The field's completely empty'. And when I groped my way to the dressing-room, the rest of the Charlton team, already out of the bath and in their civvies, were convulsed with laughter."

== Legacy and personal life ==
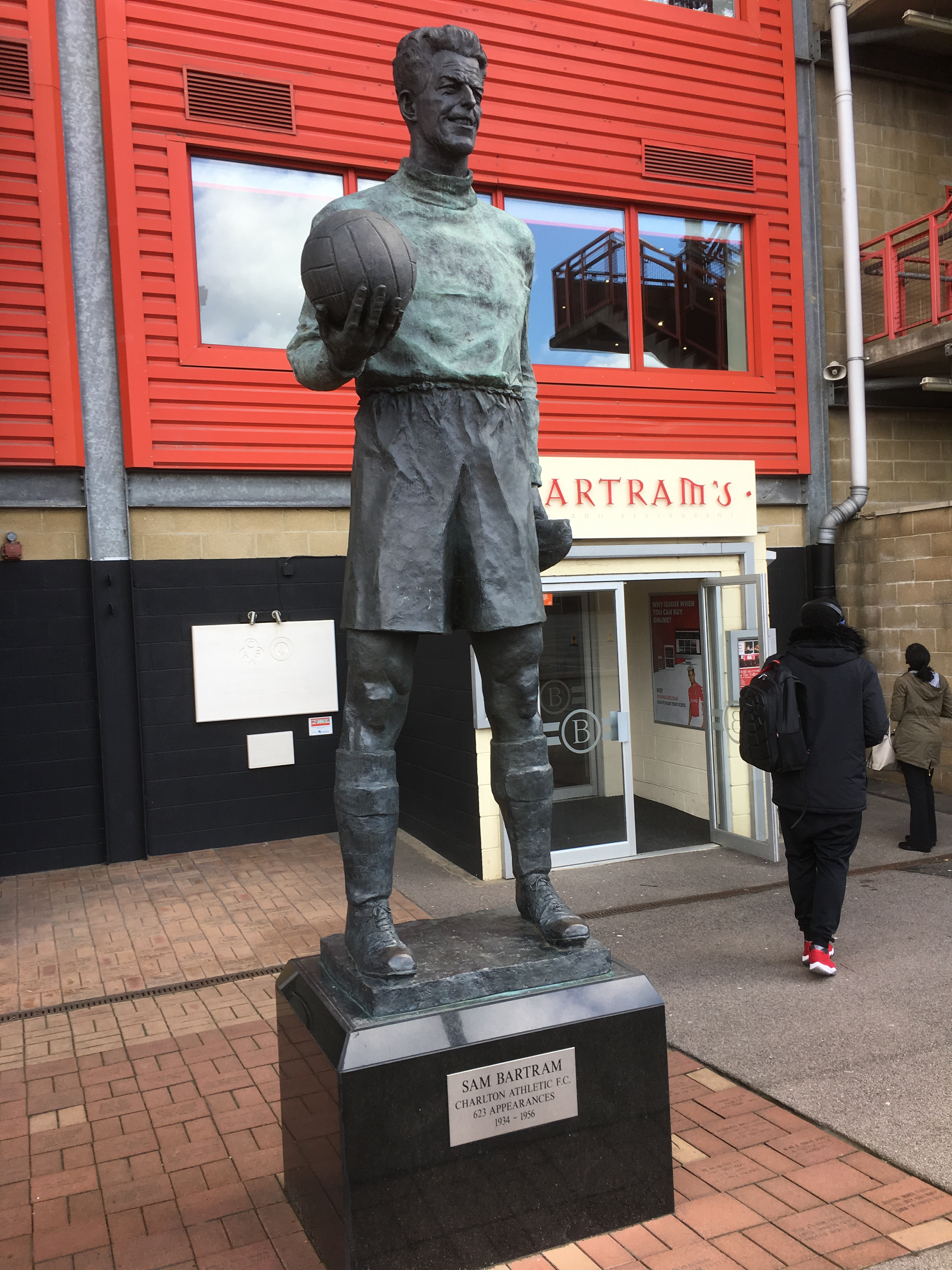
Statue of Bartram, 2009

In 1976 and 1977, an estate was built at the Jimmy Seed end of the ground, consisting of a block of flats and seven houses, named Sam Bartram Close.

In 2006, a nine-foot statue of Sam Bartram was erected outside Charlton's stadium, The Valley, to celebrate the club's centenary.

Fifty years after his retirement, Charlton named Bartram's bar and restaurant at The Valley in his honour.

He was the nephew of Jimmy Bartram, a forward who featured for Falkirk in Scotland. (Note: They were born three years apart which has led to them being described as brothers; Sam's father Samuel and Jimmy were both sons of Edwin and Elizabeth Bartram, with Jimmy the youngest in the family born 22 years after Samuel.)

== Managerial statistics ==
Team	From	To	Record				
Team	From	To	G	W	L	D	Win %
York City	1 March 1956	1 July 1960	211	85	70	56	40.28
Luton Town	1 July 1960	1 June 1962	95	35	42	18	36.84

== Honours ==
Charlton Athletic

- FA Cup: 1946–47; runner-up: 1945–46

== See also ==
- List of one-club men in association football
