= History of Chelsea F.C. (2003–2022) =

History of an English football club

This article documents the history of Chelsea Football Club, an English association football team based in Fulham, West London. For a general overview of the club, see Chelsea F.C.

In 2003, Chelsea were bought by Russian billionaire Roman Abramovich, ushering in an era of substantial success. José Mourinho led them to two league titles, an FA Cup and two League Cups in three seasons. The club added a further FA Cup in 2009, and then their first League and FA Cup "Double" in 2010. Under the stewardship of former player Roberto Di Matteo, the club won a seventh FA Cup in 2012, before winning their first UEFA Champions League title. Followed by their first UEFA Europa League victory a year after. Further Premier League victories followed in 2015 and 2017. They won their 8th FA Cup in 2018 and a second Europa League in 2019. This was followed by a second UEFA Champions League victory in 2021. In March 2022, Chelsea was seized from Abramovich after sanctions imposed by the British government. On 30 May 2022, the £4.25 billion Todd Boehly-led consortium announced completion of the ownership transfer of Chelsea, ending Abramovich's 19 year ownership of the club.

== 2003: start of Abramovich Era ==
With the club facing an apparent financial crisis, Bates unexpectedly sold Chelsea F.C. in June 2003 for £60 million. In so doing, he reportedly recognised a personal profit of £17 million on the club he had bought for £1 in 1982 (his stake had been diluted to just below 30% over the years). The club's new owner was Russian oligarch and billionaire Roman Abramovich, who also took on responsibility for the club's debt, in the region of £80 million, quickly paying some of it. He then went on a £100 million spending spree before the start of the season and landed players like Claude Makélélé, Geremi, Hernán Crespo, Wayne Bridge, Glen Johnson, Joe Cole and Damien Duff.

The spending saw a good return, with Chelsea finishing as Premier League runners-up (their best league finish for 49 years) and reaching the Champions League semi-finals after dramatically beating the Arsenal Invincibles in the quarter-finals. However, Chelsea lost the semi-final to Monaco; with manager Claudio Ranieri criticised for some tactical decisions such as switching central midfielder Scott Parker to right-back and right-back Glen Johnson to centre-back to accommodate more attackers in the team. Ranieri was eventually sacked and replaced by José Mourinho (who had lifted two Portuguese league titles, a Portuguese Cup, a Champions League title and a UEFA Cup with Porto) as the club's new manager.

== José Mourinho: double League Champions (2004–07) ==
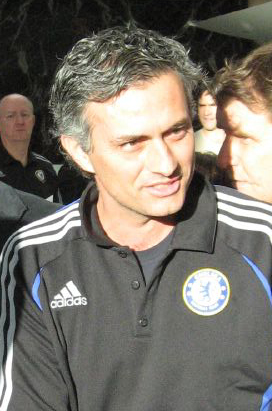
José Mourinho became Chelsea's most successful manager, leading the club to five major trophies in five seasons.

2004–05 was a successful season despite a slow start to the league season, trailing leaders Arsenal by five points. Chelsea's title campaign gradually picked up momentum, driven by the high-scoring Frank Lampard and the return from injury of talented young Dutch winger Arjen Robben. They topped the table after a win against Everton in November 2004 and never relinquished their lead, losing only one league game all season and winning a record 29, gaining a record 95 points in the process. A record-breaking defence, led by captain John Terry and his new partnership with Ricardo Carvalho, the versatile William Gallas, fullback Paulo Ferreira, midfield linchpin Claude Makélélé and goalkeeper Petr Čech, provided the backbone of the side, conceding just 15 goals all season and keeping 25 clean sheets while Čech went a Premier League-record 1,025 minutes without conceding a goal. Chelsea eventually secured the title with a 2–0 away win at Bolton thanks to two goals from Lampard, almost 50 years to the day since they had won their last league title. Winning the league completed a domestic double for the club, since Chelsea had already won the League Cup in February after a thrilling 3–2 win over Liverpool in the Final at the Millennium Stadium.

In the Champions League, Chelsea were drawn against Barcelona in the knockout round. In the first leg at the Camp Nou, Chelsea took a 1–0 lead but had Didier Drogba controversially sent-off in the second half with Chelsea still ahead, and the Catalans eventually won 2–1. Mourinho claimed that Barcelona manager Frank Rijkaard had spoken to referee Anders Frisk at half-time – a claim later proved correct – and that the result had been "adulterated". After receiving death threats from Chelsea fans, Frisk retired and Mourinho received a two-match touchline ban for bringing the game into disrepute. Chelsea won a pulsating return leg 4–2 at Stamford Bridge, with John Terry heading in a controversial winner to send them through. In the quarter-finals, a 4–2 home win over German champions Bayern Munich and a 3–2 loss in Germany were enough to ensure passage through to the semi-finals, where they faced Liverpool. Following a 0–0 draw at Stamford Bridge, Liverpool went 1–0 up at Anfield thanks to Luis García and Chelsea were unable to break down a resilient defence, thus missing out on the chance of a treble.

Chelsea's Centenary XI, selected by fans in 2005

A year later Chelsea retained their league title, signing Shaun Wright-Phillips in the summer for £21 million and setting more records in the process. Winning their first nine games, the side emphatically set the pace in the Premier League – including a 4–1 win over Liverpool at Anfield – and at one stage were 18 points ahead of nearest rivals Manchester United. Following a late-season blip, and with United on a run of nine consecutive wins, the points gap was closed to seven points as Chelsea went into a key match with West Ham. A goal down after ten minutes and a man down after 17 following Maniche's sending off, the side bounced back to win 4–1 and maintain the gap. The title was eventually secured with a 3–0 win over United at Stamford Bridge. They became the first London club to win back-to-back league titles since the 1930s, and only the fifth side to do so since the Second World War. They also set the record for the most clean sheets (six) from the start of the season and equalled the best home record for a top division team since Newcastle United in 1906–07 (18 wins and 1 draw from 19 games). In the cups, however, there was less success as they were knocked out of the Champions League by Barcelona and the FA Cup semi-final by Liverpool.

Despite the arrival of Ashley Cole, Michael Ballack and Andriy Shevchenko the 2006–07 season saw Chelsea relinquish the Premier League trophy to Manchester United after remaining second in the league for the majority of the season. The club were still in the running to achieve an unprecedented quadruple at the end of April, and played all but one of the maximum 63 possible games at the start of the season. They won the League Cup by beating Arsenal 2–1 in the last ever English cup Final at the Millennium Stadium, and beat United 1–0 in the first FA Cup Final at the new Wembley Stadium; Chelsea were also the last team to win it at the old Wembley. They reached the semi-finals of the Champions League, only to be knocked out again by Liverpool, this time in a penalty shoot-out.

== Post Mourinho Era (2007–09) ==
On 20 September 2007, Mourinho left Chelsea by "mutual consent" following an indifferent start to the season and after several months of well-documented friction between Mourinho and Abramovich. Shortly afterwards, Israeli Avram Grant, who had been appointed Chelsea's director of football on 8 July 2007, was announced as Mourinho's successor.

Despite the managerial upheaval and a high level of player absence (in all, members of the team were unavailable for selection 286 times in the 62 fixtures), Chelsea were on course to win three different competitions, a feat previously achieved by only two other English clubs, Liverpool in 1983–84 and Manchester United in 1998–99, but ultimately finished as runners-up in all three. Chelsea reached their third League Cup final in four years, but suffered a surprise 2–1 defeat to mid-table Tottenham at Wembley. Chelsea emerged as United's closest rivals in the title race; a 2–1 victory over United at Stamford Bridge in April left the teams level on points with four games remaining. The teams were still level on points going into the final game of the season, although United's superior goal difference meant Chelsea had to better their result; in the event, Chelsea drew 1–1 with Bolton Wanderers and United beat Wigan Athletic to take the title.

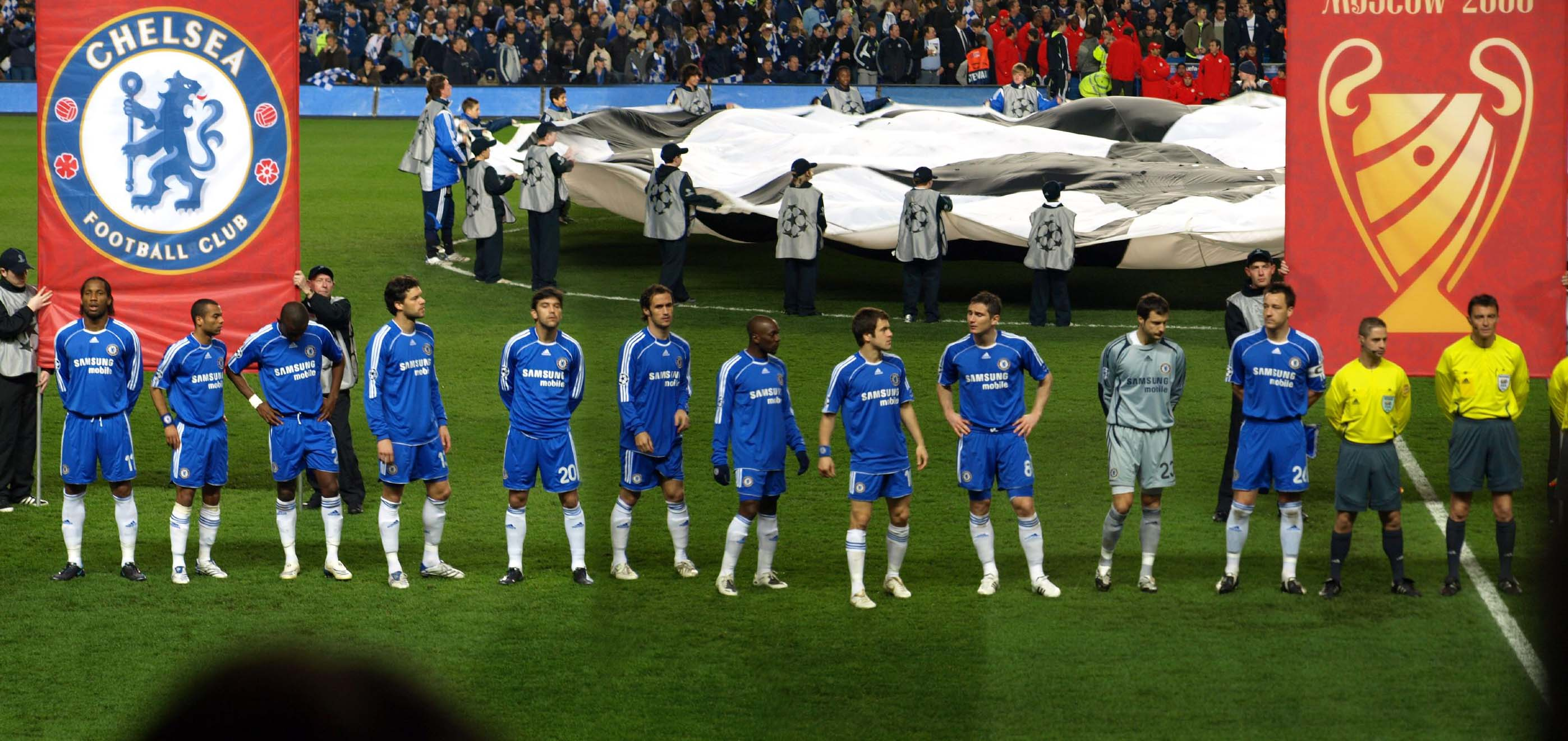
Champions League 2007–08

Grant also led Chelsea to their fourth Champions League semi-final in five years, and they were again drawn to face Liverpool, although this time it was Chelsea who prevailed, winning 4–3 on aggregate to reach the Final for the first time in their history. Their opponents in the Final were Manchester United, making it the first all-English final in the competition's history. In an even game, Lampard's first-half strike cancelled out Cristiano Ronaldo's opener, and the teams remained at 1–1 for the rest of the match, taking the final to a penalty shootout, where John Terry and Nicolas Anelka's misses from the spot gave United victory.

After the conclusion of the 2007–08 season, Chelsea became the highest ranked club under UEFA's five-year coefficient system used in the seeding of European club competitions in the following season, a sign of the consistency of the club's performance over the first five years of Roman Abramovich's ownership.

Grant was sacked as Chelsea manager three days later. Grant's replacement was Brazilian Luiz Felipe Scolari, who had guided Brazil to victory at the 2002 World Cup and Portugal to runners-up at UEFA Euro 2004. However, despite a bright start which saw Chelsea top the Premier League table early in the season, Scolari was sacked on 9 February 2009 due to "results and performances of the team... deteriorating at a key time in the season", and with the club lying fourth in the Premier League. Russia national team coach Guus Hiddink was appointed caretaker manager until the end of the season. Under Hiddink, performances and results improved; Chelsea lost just one more game all season, eventually finishing third in the league and reaching the FA Cup Final.

In the Champions League, a 7–5 aggregate win over Liverpool in the quarter-finals, including an epic 4–4 draw at Stamford Bridge, took Chelsea to another semi-final, against Barcelona. After drawing 0–0 in the first leg at the Camp Nou, Chelsea took an early lead in the second through Michael Essien, but in a controversial game in which Chelsea squandered numerous chances and had several penalty appeals turned down, a stoppage time equaliser from Andrés Iniesta sent Barcelona through on away goals. In the immediate aftermath, Drogba caused more controversy after swearing at referee Tom Henning Øvrebø. In consolation, goals from Drogba and Lampard gave Chelsea a 2–1 victory over Everton in the FA Cup Final at Wembley on 30 May, the club's second FA Cup triumph in three years.

== The Ancelotti era (2009–11) ==
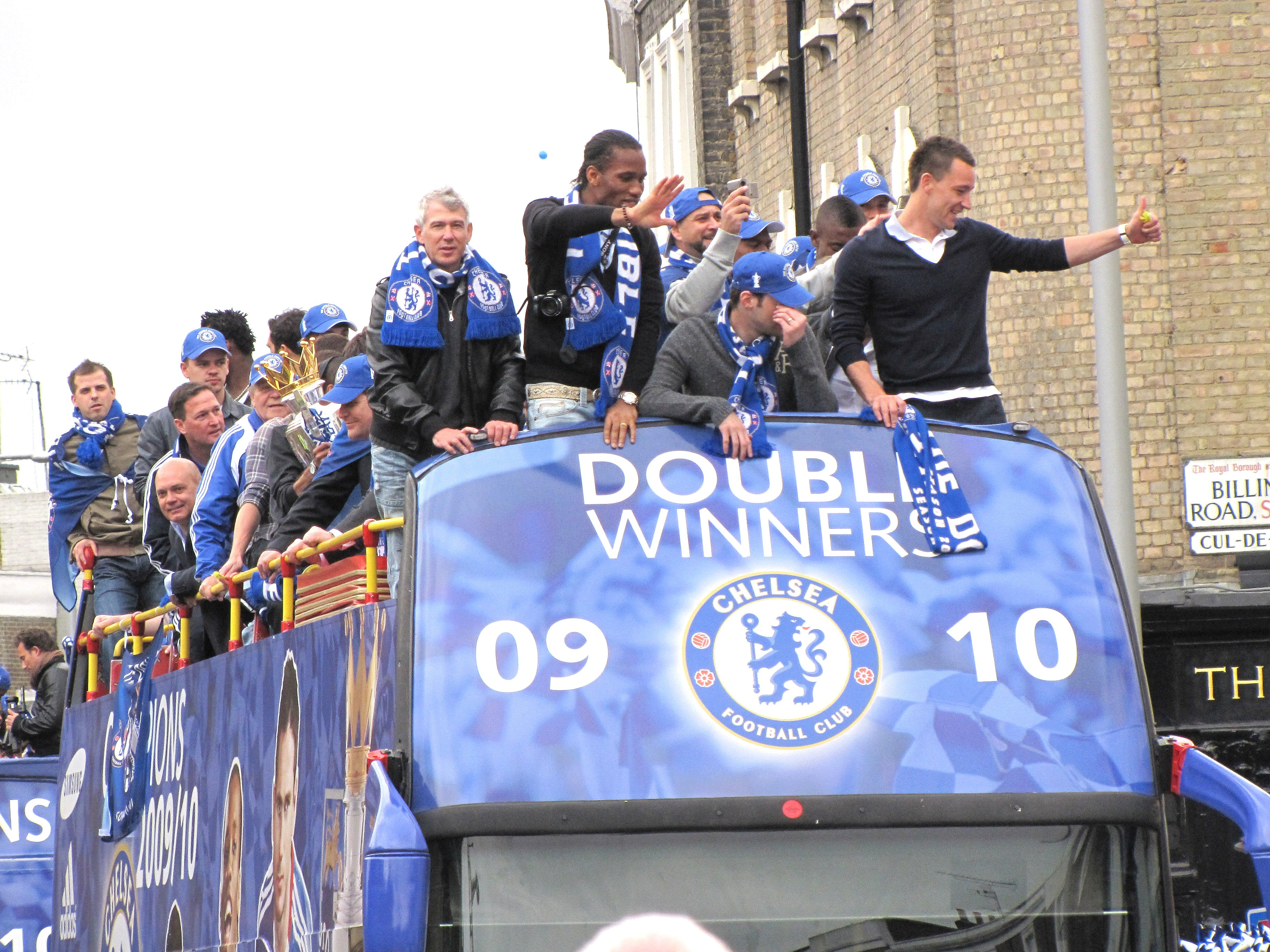
Chelsea FC parade through the streets of Fulham and Chelsea after winning their league and cup double, May 2010

Former Milan coach Carlo Ancelotti was confirmed as Hiddink's successor on 1 June 2009. He started his career by winning the World Football Challenge, played in the United States. In Ancelotti's first competitive match, Chelsea met Manchester United in the Community Shield. The game ended in a 2–2 draw, with Chelsea winning 4–1 on penalties to take the trophy, the club's first victory in a shoot-out since beating Ipswich Town in the League Cup in January 1998.

On 3 September 2009, in a rare but not unprecedented punishment, Chelsea were banned from registering any new players for the next two transfer windows, in January and Summer 2010, after FIFA's dispute resolution chamber (DRC) ruled that French winger Gaël Kakuta had breached his contract with French club Lens when he joined Chelsea in 2007, and that Chelsea had induced him to do so. The club were subsequently cleared by the Court of Arbitration for Sport (CAS) and the transfer ban was lifted.

At the end of a season in which Chelsea exchanged places at the top of the table with Manchester United several times, and were briefly leapfrogged by Arsenal, they sealed their third Premier League title in six seasons with an emphatic 8–0 home win over Wigan on the final day of the season. The win also took Chelsea's league goal tally for the season to 103, the highest since Tottenham Hotspur scored 111 in the 1962–63 season, and the first time in Premier League history that a club had scored 100 or more goals in a season. Drogba, Lampard, Anelka and Florent Malouda all scored double figures. A week later, Chelsea completed the first "league title and FA Cup double" in their history by beating Portsmouth 1–0 in the FA Cup Final, thanks to a Didier Drogba free kick, his seventh goal in six cup finals for Chelsea.

Chelsea began the 2010–11 season with a loss to Manchester United in the Community Shield. Chelsea's Premier League season started well with wins in their opening five League games, two by a 6–0 scoreline, although a dip in form saw them fighting to stay in the top four. On 31 January, Chelsea made headlines by signing a pair of stars in the final moments of the January transfer window, David Luiz for £21.3 m from Benfica and a British transfer record of £50 m for Liverpool's Fernando Torres. The two signings proved not to be enough to salvage something from Chelsea's season and they failed to win a trophy. As a result, Ancelotti was dismissed as manager shortly after Chelsea's 1–0 defeat to Everton on the final day of the season.

== André Villas-Boas: the project (2011–12) ==
On 22 June 2011, André Villas-Boas was appointed as the new Chelsea manager on a three-year contract, with immediate effect. On 14 August, Chelsea drew 0–0 their first match of the 2011–12 Premier League season away to Stoke City. Villas-Boas won his first match as Chelsea manager the following week after the Blues beat West Bromwich Albion 2–1. On 22 August, Chelsea and Valencia agreed a deal for Spanish international winger Juan Mata, who signed for £23.5 million. On transfer deadline day, Raul Meireles joined the Blues from Liverpool, while Gaël Kakuta joined Bolton on loan until 1 January 2012. On 18 September, Chelsea suffered their first defeat of the season, losing 3–1 to Manchester United at Old Trafford.

On 29 November 2011, Chelsea were knocked out of the League Cup at the quarter-final stage by Liverpool, who won 2–0 at Stamford Bridge. The loss was Chelsea's third in four games. Four days later, Villas-Boas confirmed the departures of Nicolas Anelka and Alex, both of whom had handed in their respective transfer requests to the club. The announcement was made after the away match against Newcastle which Chelsea won 3–0, putting them back into the Champions League qualification places. On 6 December, Chelsea won their final Champions League group game 3–0 against Valencia, securing progress to the knockout stages. Racing Genk's 1–1 draw against Bayer Leverkusen meant that Chelsea topped Group E. On 12 December, Chelsea inflicted league leaders Manchester City's first league defeat of the season, coming from behind in a fiery encounter with goals from Raul Meireles and a late penalty by Frank Lampard to turn the deficit into a victory. On 21 February 2012, Napoli beat Chelsea 3–1 in the first leg of their round of 16 tie.

== European Treble (2012–13) ==

2012 UEFA Champions League Final starting lineup

In March 2012, following a 1–0 defeat against West Brom, André Villas-Boas was sacked as Chelsea manager after nine months in charge; his win percentage was under 50%. At the time of his sacking, the team were fifth in the league and on the brink of Champions League elimination after a 3–1 away loss to Napoli. A club statement read that results had "not been good enough and were showing no signs of improving at a key time in the season". Italian first team assistant manager (and former Chelsea player) Roberto Di Matteo was appointed caretaker manager until the end of the season. On 14 March, Chelsea beat Napoli 4–1 in the second leg of their Champions League second round match, overturning a 3–1 deficit from the first leg. The good run of form under Di Matteo continued when Chelsea progressed to the semi-final of the FA Cup after beating Leicester City 5–2 at Stamford Bridge.

In April 2012, Chelsea progressed to the Champions League semi-finals for the sixth time in nine seasons, courtesy of a 3–1 aggregate win over Benfica. This set up a tie against holders Barcelona. On 15 April, Chelsea progressed to their third FA Cup Final in four seasons by thrashing rivals Tottenham 5–1 at Wembley; Didier Drogba scored first to extend his incredible record of scoring at every match he'd played there (seven at the time). Three days later, Chelsea faced Barcelona at Stamford Bridge as heavy underdogs. Despite Barcelona dominating possession and having the greater number of chances, Chelsea secured a hard-fought 1–0 win in the first leg. In the return leg a week later at the Camp Nou, Chelsea went 2–0 down and had captain John Terry sent off within the first 45 minutes. However, a goal on the stroke of half-time from Ramires put Chelsea into a leading position, one which they maintained thanks to a Lionel Messi penalty miss. In the dying moments, Fernando Torres scored to clinch a place in the Final, giving Chelsea a 3–2 aggregate win.

Despite their progress in the cups, Chelsea's Premier League form remained indifferent, with draws against Tottenham and Arsenal and a home loss to Newcastle effectively ended their chances of finishing in the top four of the League table. This meant that they would have to win the Champions League to secure qualification for the following season's competition. In the 2012 FA Cup Final, Chelsea faced Liverpool. Ramires put Chelsea ahead early in the match, and in the second half Didier Drogba doubled the lead. Despite Liverpool halving the deficit with an Andy Carroll strike, Chelsea held out to win their seventh FA Cup, largely thanks to heroics from goalkeeper Petr Čech, who pulled off an exceptional save to narrowly deny Andy Carroll an equaliser; this was Chelsea's fourth success in the competition in six seasons and the best record of any club in the competition since Wanderers won it five times in seven years in the nineteenth century.

In the UEFA Champions League Final, Chelsea's opponents were Bayern Munich. The match was held at the Allianz Arena, Bayern's home ground. Bayern took the lead after 83 minutes through Thomas Müller, but five minutes later Drogba headed in the equaliser – his ninth goal in nine cup finals for Chelsea – to take the game to extra time. Bayern were awarded a penalty, but Arjen Robben's strike was saved by Petr Čech. The game remained 1–1, meaning the match went to a penalty shootout. Bayern took a 3–1 lead after Juan Mata saw his penalty saved, but Bayern's Ivica Olić and Bastian Schweinsteiger's missed their spot-kicks, leaving Drogba to score the decisive spot-kick to clinch Chelsea's first Champions League title in their history. In 2013, the International Federation of Football History & Statistics (IFFHS) ranked Chelsea the number one team in the world, replacing Barcelona at the top of the world rankings.

Roberto Di Matteo was made permanent manager but was sacked in November 2012 and replaced with Rafael Benítez, an unpopular choice with many Chelsea fans owing to Benitez' association with Liverpool and comments he had previously made about the club, and he received a "fiercely hostile reception" as he was introduced at his first home game, a 0–0 draw with Manchester City on 25 November 2012. Benítez' tenure saw mixed results; Chelsea lost the Club World Cup Final to Corinthians and were beaten in the League Cup semi-finals by Swansea City. They finished third in the Premier League, ensuring Champions League qualification for 2013-14. They were eliminated in the 2012–13 UEFA Champions League group stage, becoming the first title holders to leave the competition at this stage, but then won the UEFA Europa League thanks to goals from Fernando Torres and Branislav Ivanović in the 2013 UEFA Europa League Final. In doing so, Chelsea became the first side in history to hold two major European titles simultaneously and the fourth club, and the only British club, to have won all three of UEFA's major club competitions until 2017, when Manchester United won their first UEFA Europa League trophy.

== Mourinho's second spell (2013–15) ==
On 3 June 2013, Chelsea announced the appointment of José Mourinho as manager for the second time on a four-year contract. Willian arrived soon after in August 2013 and Nemanja Matic was re-signed in the January transfer window. In Mourinho's first year back, the 2013–14, Chelsea did not win any silverware but finished 3rd with 82 points, four points behind champions Manchester City. They also reached the Champions League semi-finals, losing 3–1 on aggregate to Atlético Madrid. Another high point of the season was a 6–0 thrashing of Arsenal in March. Chelsea's biggest ever win against their North London rivals.

In the close season Chelsea signed midfielder Cesc Fàbregas from Barcelona, striker Diego Costa from Atlético Madrid, and Kurt Zouma from Saint-Étienne. Thibaut Courtois was also recalled from his loan at Atlético Madrid, and David Luiz was sold to Paris Saint-Germain for £50 million, a world record for a defender. Meanwhile, club favourites Ashley Cole, Frank Lampard and Juan Mata left with César Azpilicueta and Oscar being preferred by Mourinho. The following season, Chelsea won the Premier League title for the first time since 2009–10 after topping the table from the very start of the season. They did not lose a match until December and ultimately finished eight points clear of runners-up Manchester City. Club captain John Terry played every minute of all 38 games, equalling a record set by Gary Pallister. They also won their fifth League Cup, thanks to a 2–0 victory over Tottenham Hotspur at Wembley Stadium. However, they would be knocked in the FA Cup fourth round by League One side Bradford City after they led an unexpected comeback at Stamford Bridge to win the game 2–4, and give Chelsea their first loss at home during the entire season.

The 2015–16 season saw a poor run of form from the Premier League champions. On 17 December, Mourinho was sacked by the club after a defeat to eventual champions Leicester City which had left Chelsea one point ahead of the relegation zone after 16 games, the worst start to a season since 1978. Guus Hiddink was brought in for a second spell as caretaker manager. However, the team continued to struggle and finished tenth in the Premier League, their lowest league placing since 1995–96.

== Conte and Sarri: fifth Premier League and second Europa League title (2015–19) ==
After the sacking of Mourinho, Guus Hiddink was named caretaker manager for the remainder of the 2015–16 season. The team went unbeaten in Hiddink's first fifteen games in charge. In February 2016, Chelsea lost to Paris Saint-Germain in the first leg of the Champions League round of 16. Chelsea then lost the second leg of the round of 16, losing 2–1 at home thus being knocked out of the competition in March 2016. This was followed by an elimination from the FA Cup later that month after a 2–0 loss to Everton. However, Premier League form improved, with Chelsea rising from 16th, one point away from relegation in December 2015, to eleventh place by February 2016 after a fightback from going 1–0 down to win 2–1 at Southampton.

However, the team's form began to slip with a 1–1 home draw with Stoke City, and a 2–2 home draw against West Ham, resulting in Chelsea slipping down to tenth. In April 2016, Chelsea registered a 4–1 away win at Bournemouth, with Eden Hazard getting on the score sheet for the first time, and after going down 2–0 against rivals Tottenham, fought back to draw 2–2, Hazard again scoring to seal the Premier League for Leicester City. Chelsea drew 1–1 at Liverpool and played out a 1–1 home draw against Leicester City, with Claudio Ranieri, former Chelsea boss, being received a guard of honour.

Former Juventus and then-Italy national team head coach Antonio Conte was confirmed as new Chelsea manager in March 2016. He took charge for the 2016–17 season following Italy's participation at UEFA Euro 2016. Under Conte, the team performed well in the 2016–17 season, winning the Premier League and setting the record for most wins at the time with 30 of 38 total games in a season. N'Golo Kanté and Marcos Alonso were both signed in the summer whilst David Luiz and Victor Moses re-joined the club to play key roles.

In the subsequent season, Chelsea's form dipped again. In the UEFA Champions League, they finished second in their group after results, including draws at home to Roma and Atletico Madrid and a loss away to Roma. In the round of 16 Chelsea drew Barcelona; after a 1–1 result in the home leg Barcelona came back to win 3–0 at the Nou Camp and knocked Chelsea out of the competition. Fortunes in the EFL Cup were slightly better with the club making it to the semi-finals, but they were knocked out by Arsenal 2–1 on aggregate. The silver lining in the season was the FA Cup win in which a solitary goal from Eden Hazard sealed the Blues' victory over Manchester United at Wembley. However, the failure to qualify for the Champions League, along with manager Antonio Conte's issues of the pitch with striker Diego Costa meant that Antonio Conte was sacked before the start of the following Premier League season. He was promptly replaced by fellow Italian Maurizio Sarri for the following season.

Maurizio Sarri's first season started well with a 12 match unbeaten run in the Premier League, including 4–0 wins at home to Burnley and a 1–1 draw with eventual second-place finishers Liverpool. However, a dip in form around February meant that a title challenge was out of the question along with a defeat at home in the fifth round of the FA Cup to Manchester United. Despite calls for the club to sack the Italian around this time, Maurizio Sarri steered the club to third place in the league ahead of Tottenham Hotspur and Manchester United who had finished above them the previous season. This guaranteed Champions League qualification for the following season. Additionally, Chelsea made it to the Final of the EFL Cup, being beaten by the eventual league winners Manchester City on penalties. The club also made their way to the final of the Europa League, in which they beat Arsenal 4–1 on 29 May 2019 with goals from Hazard, Olivier Giroud and Pedro resulting in their first European trophy since 2013.

The club's appeal against a transfer ban levied by FIFA for breaching rules regarding the signing of foreign under-18 players was rejected on 8 May 2019. This meant that the club was to serve a punishment of a transfer ban for two windows. However, the club has stated that it will appeal to the Court of Arbitration for sport. Sarri subsequently departed ahead of the 2019–20 season to take charge of Juventus.

== Sexual abuse scandal ==
Off the pitch, on 29 November 2016, Chelsea became implicated in the UK football sexual abuse scandal after announcing it was investigating allegations of historical sexual abuse in the 1970s, including a secret payment to a former player who had accused the club's ex-chief scout Eddie Heath of child sexual abuse. On 2 December, the former player was named as Gary Johnson, who said he was paid £50,000 not to go public with allegations he was sexually abused by Heath. The following day, Chelsea apologised "profusely" to Johnson, who later demanded further financial compensation from the club. Also on 3 December, The Independent reported a Chelsea youth player's allegation that Dario Gradi, then Chelsea's assistant manager, visited the player's family's home to "smooth over" a complaint of sexual assault against Heath in 1974. Gradi was among the first to be targeted by a FA enquiry, and, in connection with these allegations, Gradi was suspended by the FA on 11 December 2016. Meanwhile, former Chelsea youth goalkeeper Derek Richardson also alleged abuse by Heath. In August 2019, Chelsea's board apologised "unreservedly" for allowing Heath, a "prolific and manipulative sexual abuser", to operate "unchallenged". The apology followed an inquiry led by barrister Charles Geekie QC, who was also critical of former assistant manager Gradi. He was accused of failing to tell senior club staff about a sexual conduct allegation concerning Heath made by the parent of a young player.

== Frank Lampard's return (2019–21) ==
Frank Lampard replaced Sarri after having managed Derby County assisted by former player and head of the academy Jody Morris. In Lampard's first season, the team finished 4th, also reaching the Final of the FA Cup, losing 2–1 to Arsenal. Ahead of the 2020-21 Premier League, Chelsea spent £200 million on players such as Kai Havertz, Hakim Ziyech, Timo Werner, Thiago Silva, Édouard Mendy, and Ben Chilwell.

In January 2020, Chelsea FC unveiled a mural by Solomon Souza on an outside wall of the West Stand at Stamford Bridge stadium. The mural is part of Chelsea's 'Say No to Antisemitism' campaign funded by club owner Roman Abramovich. Included on the mural are depictions of footballers Julius Hirsch and Árpád Weisz, who were killed at Auschwitz concentration camp, and Ron Jones, a British prisoner of war known as the 'Goalkeeper of Auschwitz'.

== Thomas Tuchel: second Champions League and first Club World Cup titles (2021–22) ==
In January 2021, Chelsea fired Frank Lampard after a run of poor form. Thomas Tuchel, the former manager of Paris Saint-Germain and Borussia Dortmund, was chosen as a replacement; Tuchel had led Paris Saint-Germain to their first Champions League Final the year before, where they lost to Bayern Munich.

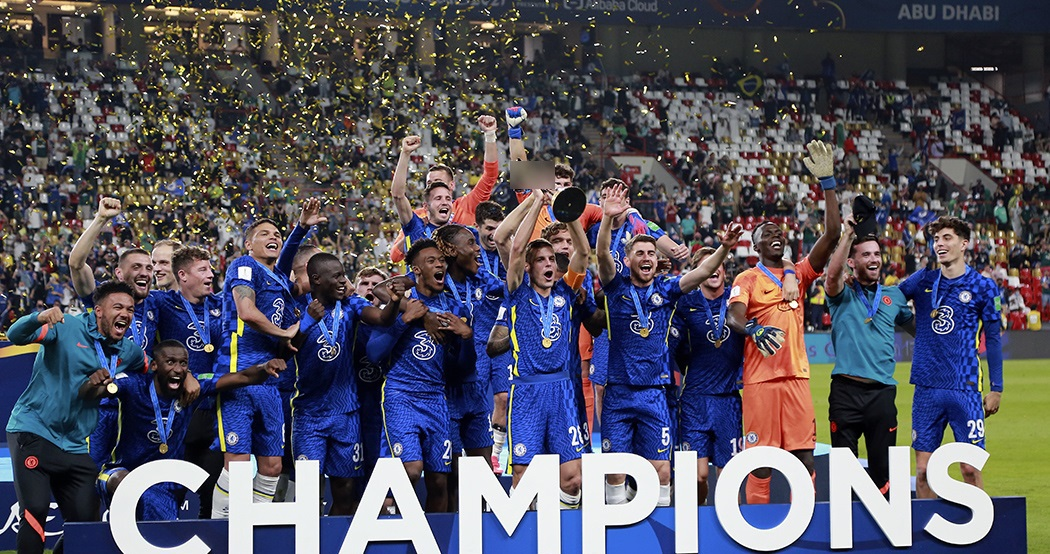
Players of Chelsea celebrating their first FIFA Club World Cup title after beating Brazilian Palmeiras in the final

Under Tuchel Chelsea went on a good run of form and were unbeaten in Tuchel's first 13 games at the club. Chelsea finished the season in the top four after being 9th in the table when Tuchel arrived. Chelsea also progressed to the FA Cup Final after knocking out Premier League leaders Manchester City, only to lose 1–0 to Leicester City in the Final. Chelsea progressed to the 2021 UEFA Champions League Final after beating Atletico Madrid, Porto, and Real Madrid in the round of 16, quarter-finals and semi-finals respectively. Chelsea won the Champions League for the second time after beating Manchester City 1–0 on May 29, 2021, at Estádio do Dragão in Porto, Portugal with Kai Havertz scoring the winner.

Chelsea started strongly in the 2021–22 season. After having won the Champions League, Tuchel guided the club to their second UEFA Super Cup, beating Villarreal 6–5 on penalties after a 1–1 draw. In August 2021, Chelsea broke their club record transfer fee by re-signing Romelu Lukaku for £97.5 million. The club topped the Premier League in December 2021. However, Chelsea's form declined, eventually finishing 3rd, nineteen points behind the leaders. Nonetheless, the club reached the League Cup Final where they lost to Liverpool on penalties after a goalless draw. The club also reached the FA Cup Final against Liverpool again. However, Chelsea lost on penalties again after a 0–0 draw; this was Chelsea's third consecutive FA Cup Final ending in defeat.

== Ownership crisis (2022) ==
=== Sanctions to Abramovich, restrictions and troubles in finding the new owner ===
"[Chelsea] have been a success machine for the last 10–20 years. That doesn't just come with money, we've seen at Manchester United and Arsenal where they've put billions into the team and not had the success that Chelsea have had. Chelsea can feel comfortable that they'll have rich owners, but will they have football smart owners? Because that's what Abramovich has been.

— Gary Neville on Abramovich's legacy.

Amidst financial sanctions leveled at Russian oligarchs by Western governments in response to the 2022 Russian invasion of Ukraine, Abramovich stated on 26 February that he would hand over the stewardship of Chelsea to the trustees of the Chelsea Foundation. The trustees did not immediately agree, due to legal concerns regarding the rules of the Charity Commission for England and Wales. A week later, Abramovich wrote-off the £1.5 billion the club owed him, and put the club up for sale, pledging to donate net proceeds from it to the victims of the war in Ukraine.

Following the sanctions placed on Roman Abramovich, British billionaire Jim Ratcliffe made a £4.25 billion bid to buy the club but this was rejected. Chelsea FC were eventually sold to US businessman Todd Boehly.

On 10 March 2022, the British government announced sanctions on Abramovich with Chelsea allowed to operate under a special licence until 31 May, while the Premier League disqualified Abramovich as a club director. In the following weeks, reports emerged of Abramovich's involvement in brokering a peace deal between Ukraine and Russia and securing safe evacuation corridors in besieged Ukrainian cities. An American government official revealed that the Ukrainian president, Volodymyr Zelenskyy had requested the US government to not levy sanctions at Abramovich given his importance in war relief efforts.
