= Tom Kersley =

English cricketer

Personal information
- Full name: Tom Kersley
- Born: 9 February 1879; Norbiton, Surrey, England
- Died: 4 December 1927 (aged 48); Folkestone, Kent, England
- Batting: Unknown
- Bowling: Unknown-arm fast-medium

Domestic team information
- Years: Team
- 1899: Surrey

Career statistics
Competition	First-class
Matches	3
Runs scored	23
Batting average	7.66
100s/50s	–/–
Top score	15*
Balls bowled	395
Wickets	7
Bowling average	20.71
5 wickets in innings	–
10 wickets in match	–
Best bowling	3/36
Catches/stumpings	1/–
- Source: Cricinfo, 20 January 2013

Tom Kersley (9 February 1879 – 4 December 1927) was an English cricketer. Kersley's batting style is unknown, though it is known he was a fast-medium bowler, but it is not known with which arm he bowled. He was born at Norbiton, Surrey.

Kersley made his first-class debut for Surrey against Nottinghamshire at Trent Bridge in the 1899 County Championship. He made two further first-class appearances for Surrey in 1899, against Cambridge University and Warwickshire. In his three matches, he took a total of 7 wickets at an average of 20.71, with best figures of 3/36. With the bat, he scored a total of 23 runs at a batting average of 7.66, with a highest score of 15 not out.

He died at Folkestone, Kent on 4 December 1927.
