= George Kersley Sr. =

George Kersley Sr. (1817-1906) was a pioneer of Western Australia in the Beverley and Dumbleyung districts.

== Early life ==
Kersley was born in Medstead, Hampshire in England on 19 January 1817 and was baptised on 17 February 1817 at St Andrew's Church. He was the son of George Kersley of Farringdon and Elizabeth Knight of Headley (daughter of Daniel Knight and Martha Upsdale). His mother Elizabeth Knight (born 1796 Headley) was a relative of the famous novelist Jane Austen whose brother Edward Austen Knight was adopted by the Knight family. Jane Austen would often visit his parents on her walks to Farringdon and Alton. His father George Kersley (born 1790 Farringdon) was the fourth son of John Kersley (b.1755) a gentleman of Farringdon, and Olive Lee Yalden. Kersley (b.1817) grew up at the Kersley Manor House in Farringdon (where his grandparents John (1755-1849) and Olive Kersley (née Yalden, 1757-1840) lived) and his father's farm in Medstead.

Kersley was the eldest of nine children.

- George Kersley b. 1817 d.1906 (went to Western Australia in 1841)m. (1851)Eliza Whittington
- Daniel Henry Kersley b.1818 d.1891 (stayed in England and was a farmer in Hartley Wintney)m.(1850) Mary Frost
- Richard Kersley b.1820 d.1888 (went to Western Australia in 1841)
- Martha Olive Kersley b.1822 d.1891 (went to Western Australia in 1869)m.(1856) Jesse Martin
- Elijah William Kersley b.1827 (went to live in New York America 1850)m. Deborah Whitford
- Elizabeth Kersley b.1831 d.1924 (stayed in England)m. Thomas Millard
- Mary Maria Kersley b.1832 d.1914 (stayed in England)m. William Mills
- Ellen Kersley b.1833 d. after 1891 (stayed in England) m. Arthur Moore
- John Anthony Kersley b.1837 (stayed in England and was a Miller in Surrey)m.(1860) Hannah Elizabeth Leech

== In Australia ==
Kersley arrived with his brother Richard Kersley (b.1820) to the Swan River Colony in Western Australia on the Ganges in 1841. By 1844 he was in partnership with James Bartram. Bartram and Kersley firstly leased Avon Dale from Mr Carey in 1844 (August 15) when Bartram was only 17 and Kersley was 27. One document about the Avon Dale research station states:

Nicholas Carey was from Frogmore, on the island of Guernsey. He had arrived in the Swan River Colony in 1830-1831 and was living at York by 1835. He was appointed a Justice of the Peace in 1837. Carey visited Britain between 1841 and 1843 and, in 1844, he leased Avondale to James Bartram and George Kersley for four years, for an annual rental of £35 and improvements. The improvements included a 'good and substantial dwelling house with a stone foundation and rammed earth walls' to the value of £100 sterling, a barn worth £50 and 50 acres (20 ha) of land cleared. The southwest portion of Location 14 was the site of soldiers barracks, a mud brick structure built in the 1830s and most likely used by the lessees of Avondale. In 1849, Carey returned to Britain after appointing Charles Wittenoom as his agent in the Colony. A letter written in December 1849, just before he left, mentions stables, as well as the barn, both of which were till under construction. In 1852, Bartram and Kersley renewed their lease of Avondale for another five years.The buildings they constructed were most likely those marked on a 1910 survey map of the property and situated some distance northwest of the current Homestead.

At this time Kersley was one of the leading settlers of the Beverley (near York) district.

In 1851 he married in Guildford Western Australia at the home of his bride Eliza Whittington (b. 4 July 1833 Upper Swan) the daughter of two of the earliest settlers to the Swan River colony Daniel Whittington and Jane Bishop (who arrived in January 1830 on the Wanstead). In the 1860s and 1870s Kersley and Henry Bartram (b.1849 Beverley), the eldest son of Kersley's partner James Bartram, would shepherd sheep to Lake Dumbleyung. In 1869 his sister Martha Olive Martin (née Kersley) and her husband Jesse Martin with their young family came from England and settled in Kelmscott (their homestead was in Kelmscott) and Gosnells (they owned the land in the hills that later became the area of Martin in the city of Gosnells). The Police Gazette of 4 February 1880 tells of the mysterious burning of 70 chains of fencing on the property Nookering owned by Kersley in the Beverley district.

== Pioneer of Dumbleyung ==
In 1875 Kersley took out the first pastoral leases in the Dumbleyung district. His wife Eliza died at Nookering on 1 March 1881. Kersley built himself a homestead at Nunegin in Dumbleyung and he built another homestead called "Wheatfield" for his daughter Elizabeth and her husband Henry Bartram who had been secretly engaged for 10 years but finally married in 1883. In 1886 Bartram and his family moved to the "Wheatfield" homestead on the edge of Lake Dumbleyung. Kersley and his son George Kersley Jr. were leading graziers or farmers of the Dumbleyung district. Kersley Jr. married Margaret, a daughter of the Catholic Cronin family from "Bunkin". Kersley died in Dumbleyung in 1906.

== Children ==
Kersley had three children with his wife Eliza Whittington.

- George James Kersley married (1896) Margaret Cronin
- Ellen Kersley married (1897) Henry (Harry) Luke McGee
- Elizabeth Kersley married (1883) Henry Bartram
