= Llew Ashcroft =

Welsh footballer

Personal information
- Full name: Llewellyn Lloyd Ashcroft
- Date of birth: 10 July 1921
- Place of birth: Flint, Wales
- Date of death: 13 June 2005 (aged 83)
- Place of death: Southport, England
- Position: Outside right

Senior career*
Years	Team	Apps	(Gls)
–1946	Flint Town		
1946–1947	Tranmere Rovers	20	(4)
Total		20	(4)
- * Club domestic league appearances and goals

Llewellyn Lloyd Ashcroft (10 July 1921 – 13 June 2005) was a Welsh footballer, who played as an outside right for Flint Town and Tranmere Rovers.
