= James Bartram =

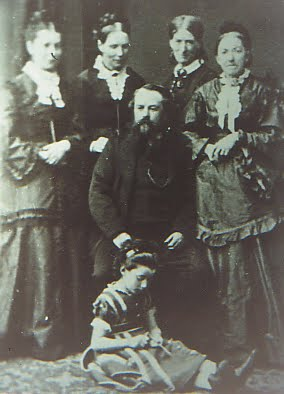
- James Bartram with his grandmother and relatives when visiting Norfolk in 1858
- Born: 1826 or 1827
- Died: 1905
- Occupation: Australian pioneer

James A Bartram (1826/27–1905) was a leading pioneer in the Western Australian town of Beverley.

== Early life ==
Bartram was born in the village of Aylmerton (in the parish of Erpingham) in Norfolk, England. He was the son of William John Bartram of Aylmerton and Ann Jane Strange. His mother Ann Strange (sister of Richard Strange) was a descendant of the Dukes of Atholl on the wrong side of the blanket. His mother died when he was young and his father died when he was 15. Bartram was one of seven children. His grandmother Lady Bartram was an Italian Jew who his grandfather met in Italy when he was visiting his Bartram relatives in Civita Vecchia. Their cousin Richard Bartram was the English Consul there.

== In Australia ==
In 1843 Bartram at the age of 16 went with his relative Thomas Carter to Western Australia. He firstly worked for Carter at his Merrow Farm Inn - the half way house between Guildford near Perth and York. He later became a leading farmer in Beverley as well as the Justice of the Peace and postman. He also assisted the presentation Catholic nuns in Beverley even though he wasn't a Catholic. He returned to visit England in 1858 and brought back farm equipment including the first wheat stripper in the Beverley district. Bartram also was the first miller in the district, and built the first police station in Beverley in 1861. Bartram may have brought his horse drawn mill from England.

This horse mill was built on "Avondale", 4 kilometres west of Beverley. The property was owned by Nicholas CAREY but leased to James BARTRAM by 1865. He advertised a horse mill for sale in July 1866. He had earlier in February advertised a portable steam mill with French Burr wheels and dresser. This included one pair of new, 91cm millstones. Became the "Avondale Research Station" in 1924. He had returned from England in 1858 with farm machinery which may have included the mill.

Bartram and George Kersley, Sr. firstly leased Avon Dale from Nicholas Carey in 1844 (August 15) when Bartram was only 17. Carey had first come to Perth in 1835 and he returned to visit England in 1841 where he may have met Bartram through Carter who was also visiting England at this time. Carey, Carter and Bartram all returned together on the Janet in 1843. One document about the Avon Dale research station states:

Nicholas Carey was from Frogmore, on the island of Guernsey. He had arrived in the Swan River Colony in 1830–1831 and was living at York by 1835. He was appointed a Justice of the Peace in 1837. Carey visited Britain between 1841 and 1843 and, in 1844, he leased Avondale to Bartram and George Kersley for four years, for an annual rental of £35 and improvements. The improvements included a 'good and substantial dwelling house with a stone foundation and rammed earth walls' to the value of £100 sterling, a barn worth £50 and 50 acres (20 ha) of land cleared. The southwest portion of Location 14 was the site of soldiers barracks, a mud brick structure built in the 1830s and most likely used by the lessees of Avondale. In 1849, Carey returned to Britain after appointing Charles Wittenoom as his agent in the Colony. A letter written in December 1849, just before he left, mentions stables, as well as the barn, both of which were still under construction. In 1852, Bartram and Kersley renewed their lease of Avondale for another five years. The buildings they constructed were most likely those marked on a 1910 survey map of the property and situated some distance northwest of the current Homestead.

Today this property is the Avondale Agricultural Research Station.

Bartram farmed at Avon Dale and Emerald Hills. He had a secret Jewish wedding ceremony in 1847 to Jane Ann Williams (born 1830) the daughter of Thomas Williams of Kilmagig Wicklow, Ireland and Eliza Leason (Pollard) of Safed, Palestine. They legally married in 1851 in a registry office. They had eight children - two sons and six daughters. His son Henry Bartram was a leading pioneer of the area around Lake Dumbleyung. His younger son John Robert Bartram remained in the Beverley district and farmed Emerald Hills and married his relative Julia Sophia Strange. Bartram went bankrupt at one stage. He died in Beverley in 1905 as a revered pioneer of the district.
