= Charlie Revell =

English footballer

Personal information
- Full name: Charles Joseph Revell
- Date of birth: 5 June 1919
- Place of birth: Belvedere, England
- Date of death: 11 December 1999 (aged 80)
- Position: Winger

Senior career*
Years	Team	Apps	(Gls)
1939–1951	Charlton Athletic	104	(15)
1944-1944	Wrexham	4	(0)
1951–1952	Derby County	22	(2)
? - ?	Eynesbury Rovers	?	(?)
Total		130	(17)
- * Club domestic league appearances and goals

Charles Revell (5 June 1919 – 1999) was an English footballer who played in the Football League for Charlton Athletic and Derby County. He also made wartime guest appearances for Blackpool, Bury, Birmingham City, Chelsea, Fulham, Wrexham and Tottenham Hotspur.
