= History of Chelsea F.C. (1983–2003) =

History of an English football club

This article documents the history of Chelsea Football Club, an English association football team based in Fulham, West London. For a general overview of the club, see Chelsea F.C.

The late 1970s through to the '80s was a turbulent period for Chelsea. An ambitious redevelopment of Stamford Bridge threatened the financial stability of the club, star players were sold and the team were relegated. Further problems were caused by a notorious hooligan element among the support, which was to plague the club throughout the decade. In 1982, Chelsea were, at the nadir of their fortunes, acquired by Ken Bates for the nominal sum of £1, although by now the Stamford Bridge freehold had been sold to property developers, meaning the club faced losing their home. On the pitch, the team had fared little better, coming close to relegation to the Third Division for the first time, but in 1983 manager John Neal put together an impressive new team for minimal outlay. Chelsea won the Second Division title in 1983–84 and established themselves in the top division with two top-six finishes, before being relegated again in 1988. The club bounced back immediately by winning the Second Division championship in 1988–89.

After a long-running legal battle, Bates reunited the stadium freehold with the club in 1992 by doing a deal with the banks of the property developers, who had been bankrupted by a market crash. Chelsea's form in the new Premier League was unconvincing, although they did reach the 1994 FA Cup Final. The appointment of Ruud Gullit as player-manager in 1996 began an upturn in the team's fortunes. He added several top international players to the side and led the club to their first major honour since 1971, the FA Cup. Gullit was replaced by Gianluca Vialli, whose reign saw Chelsea win the League Cup, the UEFA Cup Winners' Cup and the UEFA Super Cup in 1998, and the FA Cup in 2000. They also mounted a strong title challenge in 1998–99, finishing four points behind champions Manchester United, and made their first appearance in the UEFA Champions League. Vialli was sacked in favour of Claudio Ranieri, who guided Chelsea to the 2002 FA Cup Final and Champions League qualification in 2002–03.

== Revival (1983–89) ==
The summer of 1983 marked a turning point in Chelsea's history. Manager John Neal made a series of signings who were to be crucial in turning around the club's fortunes. In came striker Kerry Dixon from Reading, skillful winger Pat Nevin from Clyde, midfielder Nigel Spackman from AFC Bournemouth and goalkeeper Eddie Niedzwiecki from Wrexham in addition to John Hollins returning as player-coach, all for a combined total of less than £500,000. Dixon struck up a prolific strike partnership with fellow Neal signing David Speedie and both linked up well with Nevin, a combination that would produce almost 200 goals in three years.

The new-look Chelsea began the 1983–84 season with a 5–0 win against Derby County on the opening day and romped to promotion; among the highlights were a 5–3 win at Fulham and a 4–0 win over Kevin Keegan's Newcastle United. After a dip in form around Christmas, Neal signed winger Mickey Thomas and Chelsea did not lose another game that season. Dixon hit 36 goals in all competitions – a seasonal tally bettered only by Bobby Tambling and Jimmy Greaves – and promotion was sealed with another 5–0 win over old adversaries Leeds United. The team were crowned Second Division champions on the final day with a win away at Grimsby Town, with some 10,000 Chelsea fans making the trip to Lincolnshire.

Upon their return to the First Division, Chelsea were unlikely European contenders in 1984–85, eventually finishing sixth, although the events at Heysel that season rendered European qualification moot. They were also on course to reach their third League Cup final, drawing relegation candidates Sunderland in the semi-finals. Ex-Chelsea winger Clive Walker, however, inspired his team to a 3–2 win at Stamford Bridge to seal a 5–2 aggregate win for Sunderland, which was followed by a near-riot; the game continued with mounted police and supporters on the pitch, with the violence later spilling over onto the streets. Neal retired at the end of the season due to ill health, and was replaced by Hollins.

The 1984–85 season is also notable for the erection of an electric perimeter fence around the pitch at Stamford Bridge, the response of chairman Ken Bates to regular pitch invasions and fights during matches. The local council, however, refused permission for the electric supply to the fence to be switched on, and it was dismantled within months of being erected.

In Hollins' first season, Chelsea challenged for the title, topping the table in February, but long-term injuries to Dixon and Niedzwiecki, combined with a poor run of results, especially during the Easter period, during which the side conceded ten goals in two games, appeared to end their chances. A 2–1 win over Manchester United at Old Trafford and another by the same scoreline over West Ham at Upton Park – effectively denying the latter the title – left Chelsea three points behind leaders Liverpool with five games remaining. One point from the remaining fixtures, however, denied them the title and they finished sixth again. In the same season, the inaugural Full Members Cup was won with a 5–4 win over Manchester City at Wembley, thanks to a Speedie hat-trick and in spite of the opposition fighting back from 1–5 down.

Following this new beginning, the form of the side slumped again, finishing 14th in the next season. The spirit of the side began to disintegrate after Hollins and his assistant Ernie Walley fell out with several key players, notably Speedie and Spackman, who were subsequently sold. Hollins was sacked in March the following season with the side again in relegation trouble. Bobby Campbell took over in March but could not prevent Chelsea's relegation via the short-lived play-off system with a loss to Middlesbrough, a match which was again followed by crowd trouble and an attempted pitch invasion, resulting in a six-match closure of the terraces the following season. Nevertheless, the club bounced back immediately and emphatically, despite failing to win any of their opening six league games, and were promoted as Second Division champions with 99 points, 17 points clear of nearest rivals Manchester City. Importantly, Chelsea had managed to hang onto striker Kerry Dixon, who had a similarly prolific new partner up front in the shape of Gordon Durie, and Chelsea entered the 1990s as a First Division side.

== The 1990s: back on track ==
Chelsea had an impressive return to the First Division in 1989–90. Campbell guided a squad of mostly unremarkable players to a creditable fifth place in the final table. Although the ban on English clubs in European football was lifted that year, Chelsea missed out on a UEFA Cup place because the only English place in the competition that year went to league runners-up Aston Villa. In the same season, he led Chelsea to their second Full Members Cup success, with a 1–0 win over Middlesbrough in the final at Wembley. Despite recruiting the club's first million pound players, Dennis Wise and Andy Townsend, the next season proved a disappointment, as Chelsea finished 11th in the First Division and were knocked out of both cups by lower league opposition.

Campbell was promoted to general manager at the end of the season; he was succeeded as team manager by first team coach Ian Porterfield. Porterfield's tenure began brightly and the team were 6th in February, but a poor run of results in the final months of the season meant they finished a disappointing 14th. Meanwhile, a run to the FA Cup quarter-finals was ended by Second Division Sunderland after a replay. In the close season, Chelsea were one of the 22 First Division clubs to formally resign from the Football League and join the newly formed Premier League. Porterfield was sacked halfway through the 1992–93 season, with the team having not won a league match for two months. He was replaced on a caretaker basis by 1970 FA Cup winner, David Webb, who steered the club clear of relegation and eventually secured an 11th-place finish. Webb was replaced by 35-year-old former England midfielder Glenn Hoddle, who had just won promotion to the Premiership as player-manager of Swindon Town.

Hoddle's first season as manager saw Chelsea's league form dip slightly, and for a time they were threatened by relegation, with the goals of £1.5 million signing Mark Stein and form of £400,000 signing Dmitri Kharine playing an important part in survival. In the same season, Chelsea reached the FA Cup Final, where they faced Premiership champions Manchester United, a team Chelsea had beaten 1–0 in both league games that season. After going in 0–0 at half-time, United were awarded two second-half penalties by referee David Elleray in the space of five minutes, both of which were scored. With Chelsea having to attack, it left gaps in defence and United eventually won 4–0. This was nevertheless sufficient for Chelsea to compete in the 1994–95 Cup Winners' Cup, since United had already qualified for the Champions League. They reached the semi-finals of that competition, going out 3–2 on aggregate to eventual winners Real Zaragoza.

With Chelsea's future at Stamford Bridge now secure, Bates and millionaire director Matthew Harding were now making money available for the club to spend on players. In the summer of 1995, Chelsea recruited two world-famous players, Dutch legend Ruud Gullit, on a free transfer from Sampdoria, and Manchester United striker Mark Hughes (£1.5 million), both of whom would play a significant role in the club's future success. Hoddle also signed talented Romanian full-back Dan Petrescu for £2.3 million. Hoddle guided Chelsea to another 11th-place finish in 1995–96, and another FA Cup semi-final, and then resigned to become manager of the England national team.

== The Italian Renaissance: Gullit, Vialli and Zola (1996–2000) ==
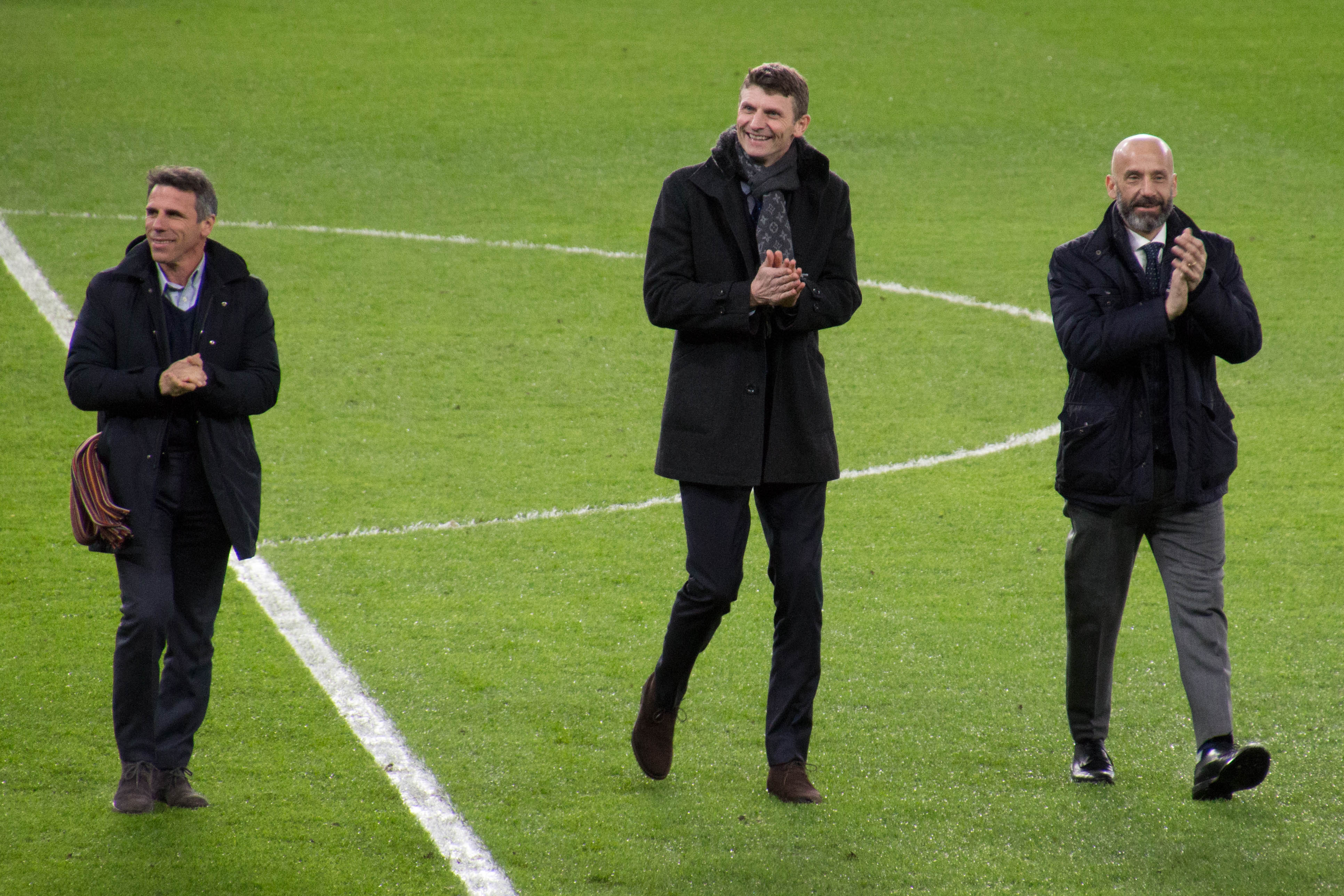
Gianfranco Zola, Tore André Flo and Gianluca Vialli at Stamford Bridge in 2018

Gullit was appointed player-manager for the 1996–97 season, and added several top-class players to the side, including European Cup-winning Juventus striker Gianluca Vialli, cultured French defender Frank Leboeuf and Italian internationals Gianfranco Zola (whose skill would make him a firm favourite with the crowd and see him become one of Chelsea's greatest ever players) and Roberto Di Matteo (the latter for a club record £4.9 million). They were later joined by the powerful and prolific Uruguayan midfielder Gus Poyet and Norwegian "super-sub" Tore André Flo. With such players, it was under Gullit and his successor that Chelsea emerged as one of England's top sides again and gained a reputation for playing a neat, entertaining and attractive passing game performed by technically gifted players, though the club's inconsistency against supposed "smaller" teams remained.

Gullit capped an impressive first season in management by leading Chelsea to their highest league placing since 1990 (sixth) and winning the FA Cup, ending the club's 26-year wait for a major trophy. The most memorable match of the run was a fourth round comeback against Liverpool, in which Chelsea, inspired by Hughes, overturned a 2–0 half-time deficit to win 4–2. The 2–0 victory over Middlesbrough in the final at Wembley got off to a frantic start with Di Matteo scoring after 43 seconds; Eddie Newton's late goal clinched it. The win was a happy end to a season which had looked to be dominated by sadness after the death in October of popular director and financial benefactor Matthew Harding in a helicopter crash following a League Cup match against Bolton Wanderers.

Gullit was suddenly sacked in February 1998, ostensibly after a contract dispute, with the team second in the Premiership, and in the semi-finals of two cup competitions. Another player-manager was appointed, the 33-year-old Vialli. Vialli began his management career in style by winning two trophies in two months. The League Cup was secured with another 2–0 win over Middlesbrough at Wembley (with Di Matteo again on the scoresheet). Chelsea reached the Cup Winners' Cup final following a dramatic semi-final win against Vicenza. Having lost the away leg 1–0 and then conceded an away goal in the second leg, Chelsea bounced back to win 3–1 on the night and go through, with Hughes again the catalyst. They won their second Cup Winners' Cup title with a 1–0 victory against VfB Stuttgart at the Råsunda Stadium in Stockholm; Zola, a second-half substitute, scored the winning goal just 17 seconds after coming on. Following that, Vialli led the club to a 1–0 win over European champions Real Madrid in the Super Cup at the Stade Louis II in Monaco.

During the 1998–99 Premiership campaign, Chelsea made their first sustained challenge for the title for years. Despite an opening day loss against Coventry City, the side were not beaten in the League again until January and topped the table at Christmas. Their title chances eventually disappeared after a home loss to West Ham and consecutive draws against Middlesbrough, Leicester City and Sheffield Wednesday in April, which saw the Blues finish third, four points behind winners Manchester United. A season which promised much ultimately ended trophyless, as Chelsea's defence of their Cup Winners' Cup title ending in a semi-final loss against Mallorca. They were also knocked out of both the other cups in the quarter-finals. Third place in the league was nevertheless high enough for a first-ever appearance in the Champions League.

2000 FA Cup Final starting lineup

Forty-four years after being denied entry to the inaugural championship, Chelsea made their debut in Europe's premier competition in August 1999 and they put in a series of impressive performances en route to a quarter-final tie against Barcelona. It included memorable draws at the San Siro and the Stadio Olimpico against Milan and Lazio respectively, as well as a thumping 5–0 win against Turkish side Galatasaray at the Ali Sami Yen Stadium. During the first leg of the quarter-final against Barcelona at Stamford Bridge, Chelsea took a 3–0 lead, only to concede a late Luís Figo away goal. Trailing 2–1 during the second leg at the Camp Nou, the team were just seven minutes away from the semi-finals, but conceded a third and were eventually beaten 5–1 after extra time, losing 6–4 on aggregate.

By now, Chelsea had a top-notch multi-national squad which included Zola, Di Matteo, Poyet but also Spanish full-back Albert Ferrer, Dutch goalkeeper Ed de Goey, and French World Cup-winning trio Frank Leboeuf, Marcel Desailly and Didier Deschamps. Under Vialli, Chelsea would become the first side in English football to field a starting 11 composed entirely of foreign players, highlighting the increasing internationalization of the game. The 1999–2000 season saw inconsistency return to Chelsea's league form as the side struggled to juggle Premier League and Champions League commitments, ultimately finishing a disappointing fifth. Vialli did lead the team to a second FA Cup win in four years that season – this time against Aston Villa, with Di Matteo again scoring the winner – in the last final to be played at Wembley before its redevelopment. The Charity Shield was added in August with a 2–0 win against Manchester United, to make Vialli Chelsea's then most successful manager.

== Early 2000s: Claudio Ranieri ==
Vialli spent almost £26 million on new players during the summer, including high-scoring Dutchman Jimmy Floyd Hasselbaink and talented Icelandic striker Eiður Guðjohnsen, but was dismissed in September 2000 after winning just one of the opening five matches and, once again, with rumours circulating that the manager had fallen out with important players. He was replaced by another Italian, Claudio Ranieri, who, in spite of his initial problems with the English language, guided them to another top six finish in his first season. Ranieri gradually re-built the side, reducing the average age of the squad by selling some older players, including Wise and Poyet, and replacing them with Carlo Cudicini, John Terry, William Gallas, Frank Lampard and Jesper Grønkjær.

Ranieri's second season saw some more progress, mainly in the cups, with Chelsea reaching the League Cup semi-finals and another FA Cup final, but was unable to prevent them from losing to double winners Arsenal in the latter. League form saw little improvement, though, and Chelsea again finished sixth. With rumours of the club's perilous financial state circulating, Ranieri was unable to sign any more players. As a result, expectations of Chelsea in the 2002–03 season were more limited. Chelsea nevertheless made an unexpected title challenge and, in perhaps one of the most significant matches in the club's history, defeated Liverpool 2–1 in the final game of the season to finish fourth and secure the final Champions League berth ahead of the Merseysiders.
