= Jimmy Bartram =

English footballer

Personal information
- Full name: James Leslie Bartram
- Date of birth: 8 March 1911
- Place of birth: South Shields, England
- Date of death: 1987 (aged 75–76)
- Place of death: Bristol, England
- Position: Centre forward

Senior career*
Years	Team	Apps	(Gls)
1932	Portsmouth	0	(0)
1932	North Shields		
1932–1935	Falkirk	68	(61)
1935	Northampton Town	12	(3)
1935–1936	Queen of the South	14	(7)
1936–?	South Shields		
1941–1942	Morton		
- * Club domestic league appearances and goals

James Leslie Bartram (8 March 1911 – 1987) was an English footballer who played as a centre forward for clubs including Portsmouth, North Shields, Falkirk, Northampton Town and Queen of the South plus a brief spell with Morton during World War II.

His time at Falkirk was prolific in terms of scoring, making good use of his strong physique (which combined with his surname gave rise to a nickname of "Battering-Ram") to claim 67 goals in 73 Scottish Football League and Scottish Cup matches, leading to a transfer to Northampton for a club record fee of £1,000 in June 1935; however, by December of the same year he had been moved on to Queen of the South, where he only played for the Dumfries club in the league until the end of that same season, though remained contracted to them until the outbreak of the war. He went back to North East of England and signed for South Shields in July 1936.

He was the uncle of Sam Bartram, the long-serving goalkeeper for Charlton Athletic. (Note: They were born three years apart which has led to them being described as brothers; Sam's father Samuel and Jimmy were both sons of Edwin and Elizabeth Bartram, with Jimmy the youngest in the family born 22 years after Samuel.)
