= History of Chelsea F.C. (2022–present) =

History of an English football club

This article documents the history of Chelsea Football Club, an English association football team based in Fulham, West London. For a general overview of the club, see Chelsea F.C.

== Start of Boehly's consortium era (2022–2026) ==
On 7 May 2022, Chelsea Football Club confirmed that terms have been agreed for a new ownership group, led by Todd Boehly, Clearlake Capital, Mark Walter and Hansjörg Wyss, to acquire the club. On 25 May 2022, the British government approved the £4.25 billion Todd Boehly-led consortium takeover of Chelsea. On 30 May 2022, the sale was completed, ending Abramovich's 19 year ownership of the club.

The consortium led by Todd Boehly, chairman and CEO of Eldridge Industries, and Clearlake Capital, announced completion of the ownership transfer of Chelsea on the 30 May 2022. The consortium included Hansjörg Wyss, founder of the Wyss Foundation, and Mark Walter, co-founder and CEO of Guggenheim Partners. Walter and Boehly are owners of the Los Angeles Dodgers, the Los Angeles Lakers, and the Los Angeles Sparks. The transaction received all necessary approvals from the governments of the United Kingdom and Portugal, the Premier League, and other authorities that were mentioned by the club in their statement.

The club then announced on the 20 June that Bruce Buck, who served as Chairman since 2003, would be stepping down from his role effective 30 June although he would continue to support the club as a Senior Advisor. This was followed by the club then announcing the departure of long-serving club director and de facto sporting director Marina Granovskaia on the 22 June 2022.

=== Thomas Tuchel ===
In the 2022 summer transfer window, Chelsea spent more money in a transfer window than any other club in Premier League history. The blues spent more than £250 million on players such as: Raheem Sterling, Marc Cucurella, Kalidou Koulibaly, Wesley Fofana and Pierre-Emerick Aubameyang. Following a Champions League defeat to Dinamo Zagreb, Todd Boehly decided to sack Thomas Tuchel early in the 2022–23 season. The BBC reported an uneasy relationship between Boehly and Tuchel regarding transfer decisions.

=== Graham Potter ===
In September 2022, Chelsea decided to appoint Brighton & Hove Albion manager Graham Potter. In the January transfer window, Chelsea broke the British transfer record by signing Enzo Fernández for £107 million. By spending over £300 million in the January window, they became the first club in history to outspend all four major leagues combined. Potter was later sacked in April 2023 with the club sitting at 11th place in the table. Throughout the season, Chelsea scored a record-low 38 goals across the entire season and finished up in the bottom half for the first time since 1995–96.

=== Frank Lampard ===
On 6 April 2023, Frank Lampard returned to Chelsea by being appointed as caretaker manager until the end of the 2022–23 season, following the dismissal of Graham Potter. Chelsea's form dropped after Lampard took over and produced a first bottom-half finish since 1996 and a record low tally of points and goals scored in the Premier League era. In terms of winning percentage, Lampard also had the worst record (9%) among every Chelsea manager who had led 3 or more matches, achieving just one win in his 11 matches in charge.

=== Mauricio Pochettino ===
On 29 May 2023, it was announced that Mauricio Pochettino would take over managerial duties starting from 1 July 2023, replacing interim Frank Lampard. Pochettino led Chelsea to a 6th-place finish after winning their final five games of the 2023–24 season, which earned the club a Conference League play-off round qualification. After clashing with the sporting directors Laurence Stewart and Paul Winstanley over strategy and management of the young squad, Pochettino agreed to leave the club at the end of the season.

=== Enzo Maresca ===
On 3 June 2024, Enzo Maresca was announced as Pochettino's replacement, with the Italian set to start his term as manager on 1 July 2024. Maresca signed a five-year deal with an option to extend for a further year. Maresca would be Chelsea's 5th manager under the new Todd Boehly regime in just two years. Chelsea had a relatively strong start to the 2024–25 season with 22 points in his first 12 matches in the Premier League. On 18 August 2024, his first game in charge ended in a 0–2 home defeat to the champions Manchester City. A week later, he achieved his first win as Chelsea manager in the Premier League by thrashing Wolverhampton Wanderers 6–2 thanks to a hat-trick from Noni Madueke and other goals scored by Cole Palmer, Nicolas Jackson and João Félix. Better results in following matches, with three consecutive wins over Bournemouth, West Ham and Brighton, led to the best start in a Premier League season by the club since 2021. Enzo Maresca was named Premier League Manager of the Month for September 2024 as a result.

Maresca led Chelsea to win the Conference League in a 4–1 victory over Real Betis in the 2024–25 season in Poland, as they became the first club to win all four main UEFA competitions, as well as all UEFA Men's competitions. On 13 July 2025, he also guided Chelsea to victory in the 2025 FIFA Club World Cup, the first edition of the expanded competition, when Chelsea secured the trophy with a 3–0 win over Champions League winners Paris Saint-Germain in the final.

On 1 January 2026, it was announced that Maresca was stepping down from his role as Chelsea manager by mutual consent, following tensions with the club's owners.

=== Liam Rosenior ===
On 6 January 2026, Liam Rosenior was appointed as the new Chelsea head coach on a six-and-a-half-year deal.

However, on 22 April 2026, Rosenior was sacked with the club 7th following five consecutive defeats in the league and hadn't scored in all of those defeats. The club announced assistant Calum McFarlane would take over until the end of the season.

=== Calum McFarlane ===
On 26 April 2026, Chelsea reached the final of the FA Cup in McFarlane's first game as interim head coach, beating Leeds United 1-0 with Enzo Fernández with the only goal. However, they were ultimately beaten 1-0 in the final against Manchester City.

On 24 May 2026, Chelsea lost 2-1 at home to Sunderland which meant they finished 10th and missed out on European football for the first time since the 2023–24 season.

=== Xabi Alonso ===
On 18 May 2026, Chelsea announced that Xabi Alonso would become manager on a four-year contract starting from 1 July 2026.

== Full control from Clearlake Capital (2026–) ==
On 16 September 2026, Chelsea announced that Clearlake Capital acquired the ownership interest of Todd Boehly. Hansjörg Wyss remained an important stakeholder and partner in the ownership group. As part of the transition, Clearlake also acquired Mark Walter’s ownership interest and therefore acquire full control of the Club. Todd Bohely stepped down as Chairman after his four-year tenure.
