= 1969–70 Chelsea F.C. season =

English football club season

Chelsea
1969-70 season
- Chairman: Brian Mears
- Manager: Dave Sexton
- First Division: 3rd
- FA Cup: Winners
- League Cup: Fourth round
- Top goalscorer: League: Peter Osgood (23); All: Peter Osgood (31)
- Highest home attendance: 61,479 vs Manchester United (21 March 1970)
- Lowest home attendance: 24,904 vs Burnley (17 September 1969)
Home colours	Away colours

The 1969-70 season was Chelsea Football Club's 56th of competitive football, and the club's 43rd in the English top flight.

The club began the season having not signed a single player. Defender Paddy Mulligan, who joined in October for £17,500, was the sole recruit during the campaign. Bobby Tambling spent his final season with the club. He moved to Crystal Palace on loan in January before leaving permanently in May. Tambling departed as Chelsea's all-time top goalscorer, a record he held until 2013 when his tally of 202 goals was surpassed by Frank Lampard.

The season proved to be a success, as the club won the FA Cup for the first time in their history with a hard-fought replayed win over Leeds United. The club also finished 3rd in the First Division, their highest placing since 1965. Chelsea were for a time in title contention, although an indifferent start and heavy defeats at the hands of rivals Leeds and Everton ultimately ended their chances.

Midfielders John Hollins and Peter Houseman did not miss a game. Hollins was also voted Chelsea's Player of the Year by the fans. Peter Osgood finished as top scorer, with 31 goals in all competitions, and became the last man to date to score in every round of the FA Cup. The average home attendance for the season was 40,342.

== Squad statistics ==
Pos.	Name	League		FA Cup		League Cup		Total	
Pos.	Name	Apps	Goals	Apps	Goals	Apps	Goals	Apps	Goals
GK	(England) Peter Bonetti	36	0	8	0	4	0	48	0
GK	(Scotland) Tommy Hughes	6	0	0	0	0	0	6	0
DF	(Republic of Ireland) John Dempsey	37	2	8	1	3	0	48	3
DF	(England) Ron Harris	30	0	8	0	3	0	41	0
DF	(England) Marvin Hinton	28	0	2(2)	0	4	0	34(2)	0
DF	(Scotland) Stewart Houston	6(3)	0	0	0	1	0	7(3)	0
DF	(Scotland) Eddie McCreadie	30(1)	0	8	0	2	0	40(1)	0
DF	(Republic of Ireland) Paddy Mulligan	8(2)	0	0	0	0	0	8(2)	0
DF	(England) David Webb	35	4	8	3	3	0	46	7
MF	(Scotland) John Boyle	7(1)	0	0	0	3	0	10(1)	0
MF	(Scotland) Charlie Cooke	35	4	6	0	3(1)	1	44(1)	5
MF	(England) Alan Hudson	29	3	6	0	2	0	37	3
MF	(England) John Hollins	42	6	8	1	4	0	54	7
MF	(England) Peter Houseman	42	3	8	6	4	0	54	9
MF/FW	(England) Tommy Baldwin	19(2)	5	5	1	1	0	25(2)	6
FW	(England) Alan Birchenall	15(1)	3	0	0	4	2	19(1)	5
FW	(England) Ian Hutchinson	27(1)	16	8	5	1	1	35(1)	22
FW	(England) Peter Osgood	38(2)	23	7	8	3	0	48(2)	31
FW	(England) Bobby Tambling	7(2)	0	0	0	0	0	7(2)	0

- Substitute appearances in parentheses. Substitute appearances included in totals

== Results ==
=== First Division ===
9 August 1969 1	Liverpool	4–1	Chelsea	Liverpool
	Lawler 27'; St John 48', 83'; Strong 60'		Hutchinson 47'	Stadium: Anfield; Attendance: 48,383

11 August 1969 2	West Ham United	2–0	Chelsea	London
	Peters 68'; Hurst 84'			Stadium: Upton Park; Attendance: 39,003

16 August 1969 3	Chelsea	1–0	Ipswich Town	London
	Hutchinson 74'			Stadium: Stamford Bridge; Attendance: 29,613

20 August 1969 4	Chelsea	0–0	West Ham United	London
				Stadium: Stamford Bridge; Attendance: 43,346

23 August 1969 5	Southampton	2–2	Chelsea	Southampton
	Paine 3'; Kemp 31'		Osgood 4', 76'	Stadium: The Dell; Attendance: 25,935

27 August 1969 6	Tottenham Hotspur	1–1	Chelsea	London
	Pearce 79'		Webb 46'	Stadium: White Hart Lane; Attendance: 47,395

30 August 1969 7	Chelsea	1–1	Crystal Palace	London
	Osgood 68'		Hoy 36'	Stadium: Stamford Bridge; Attendance: 41,908

6 September 1969 8	Manchester City	0–0	Chelsea	Manchester
				Stadium: Maine Road; Attendance: 35,995

13 September 1969 9	Chelsea	2–2	Wolverhampton Wanderers	London
	Dempsey 59'; Osgood 62'		Curran 83', 87'	Stadium: Stamford Bridge; Attendance: 38,599

17 September 1969 10	Chelsea	2–0	Burnley	London
	Birchenall 58'; Houseman 90'			Stadium: Stamford Bridge; Attendance: 24,904

20 September 1969 11	Leeds United	2–0	Chelsea	Leeds
	Giles 37' (pen.); Lorimer 78'			Stadium: Elland Road; Attendance: 33,130

27 September 1969 12	Chelsea	3–0	Arsenal	London
	Birchenall 10', 52'; Baldwin 85'			Stadium: Stamford Bridge; Attendance: 46,370

4 October 1969 13	Sunderland	0–0	Chelsea	Sunderland
				Stadium: Roker Park; Attendance: 24,216

11 October 1969 14	Chelsea	2–2	Derby County	London
	Houseman 57'; Hollins 82'		Hector 52'; O'Hare 71'	Stadium: Stamford Bridge; Attendance: 51,421

18 October 1969 15	Chelsea	2–0	West Bromwich Albion	London
	Osgood 40'; Cooke 45'			Stadium: Stamford Bridge; Attendance: 34,810

25 October 1969 16	Newcastle United	0–1	Chelsea	Newcastle-upon-Tyne
			Osgood 58'	Stadium: St James' Park; Attendance: 40,088

1 November 1969 17	Chelsea	1–0	Coventry City	London
	Cooke 47'			Stadium: Stamford Bridge; Attendance: 38,899

8 November 1969 18	Sheffield Wednesday	1–3	Chelsea	Sheffield
	Prendergast 90'		Hutchinson 40', 58'; Osgood 75'	Stadium: Hillsborough; Attendance: 18,044

15 November 1969 19	Chelsea	1–1	Everton	London
	Osgood 11'		Husband 6'	Stadium: Stamford Bridge; Attendance: 49,895

18 November 1969 20	Ipswich Town	1–4	Chelsea	Ipswich
	Viljoen 37'		Hutchinson 12'; Osgood 63', 84'; Hollins 90'	Stadium: Portman Road; Attendance: 20,935

22 November 1969 21	Nottingham Forest	1–1	Chelsea	Nottingham
	Newton 43'		Cooke 62'	Stadium: City Ground; Attendance: 23,808

6 December 1969 22	Manchester United	0–2	Chelsea	Manchester
			Hutchinson 12', 38'	Stadium: Old Trafford; Attendance: 49,344

13 December 1969 23	Wolverhampton Wanderers	3–0	Chelsea	Wolverhampton
	Wagstaffe 41'; Curran 43', 51'			Stadium: Molineux; Attendance: 26,775

20 December 1969 24	Chelsea	3–1	Manchester City	London
	Webb 26', 30'; Hutchinson 42'		Summerbee 88'	Stadium: Stamford Bridge; Attendance: 34,791

26 December 1969 25	Chelsea	3–1	Southampton	London
	Hutchinson 31', 61'; Hollins 68'		Channon 86'	Stadium: Stamford Bridge; Attendance: 41,489

27 December 1969 26	Crystal Palace	1–5	Chelsea	London
	Queen 17'		Osgood 36', 65', 78', 80'; Houseman 85'	Stadium: Selhurst Park; Attendance: 49,498

10 January 1970 27	Chelsea	2–5	Leeds United	London
	Hollins 36'; Osgood 41'		Clarke 16'; Cooper 47'; Giles 57' (pen.); Lorimer 60'; Jones 64'	Stadium: Stamford Bridge; Attendance: 57,221

17 January 1970 28	Arsenal	0–3	Chelsea	London
			Hollins 40'; Hutchinson 81'; Baldwin 89'	Stadium: Highbury; Attendance: 51,338

31 January 1970 29	Chelsea	3–1	Sunderland	London
	Osgood 19', 22', 78'		Baker 71'	Stadium: Stamford Bridge; Attendance: 38,775

11 February 1970 30	Derby County	2–2	Chelsea	Derby
	Durban 79'; Hector 83'		Osgood 43'; Baldwin 78'	Stadium: Baseball Ground; Attendance: 35,109

25 February 1970 31	Chelsea	0–0	Newcastle United	London
				Stadium: Stamford Bridge; Attendance: 35,341

28 February 1970 32	Coventry City	0–3	Chelsea	Coventry
			Baldwin 25'; Webb 53'; Hudson 82'	Stadium: Highfield Road; Attendance: 37,448

7 March 1970 33	Chelsea	1–1	Nottingham Forest	London
	Baldwin 8'		McCaffrey 84'	Stadium: Stamford Bridge; Attendance: 38,280

17 March 1970 34	Chelsea	1–0	Stoke City	London
	Cooke 89'			Stadium: Stamford Bridge; Attendance: 28,996

21 March 1970 35	Chelsea	2–1	Manchester United	London
	Hutchinson 14', 19'		Morgan 75'	Stadium: Stamford Bridge; Attendance: 61,479

25 March 1970 36	Chelsea	3–1	Sheffield Wednesday	London
	Hutchinson 8'; Osgood 21' (pen.); Hudson 57'		Sinclair 4'	Stadium: Stamford Bridge; Attendance: 29,590

28 March 1970 37	Everton	5–2	Chelsea	Liverpool
	Kendall 1'; Ball 4'; Royle 39', 47'; Whittle 59'		Dempsey 64'; Osgood 88'	Stadium: Goodison Park; Attendance: 57,828

30 March 1970 38	West Bromwich Albion	3–1	Chelsea	West Bromwich
	Brown 30', 68'; Astle 47'		Hutchinson 57'	Stadium: The Hawthorns; Attendance: 31,207

4 April 1970 39	Chelsea	1–0	Tottenham Hotspur	London
	Baldwin 4'			Stadium: Stamford Bridge; Attendance: 44,925

13 April 1970 40	Stoke City	1–2	Chelsea	Stoke-on-Trent
	Stevenson 53'		Hutchinson 13'; Skeels 39' (o.g.)	Stadium: Victoria Ground; Attendance: 22,707

14 April 1970 41	Burnley	3–1	Chelsea	Burnley
	Dobson 10'; Kindon 15', 57'		Hollins 16'	Stadium: Turf Moor; Attendance: 12,030

18 April 1970 42	Chelsea	2–1	Liverpool	London
	Osgood 21', 68' (pen.)		Graham 26'	Stadium: Stamford Bridge; Attendance: 36,521

==== League table ====
Pos	Team	Pld	W	D	L	GF	GA	GAv	Pts	Qualification or relegation
1	Everton (C)	42	29	8	5	72	34	2.118	66	Qualification for the European Cup first round
2	Leeds United	42	21	15	6	84	49	1.714	57	Qualification for the Inter-Cities Fairs Cup first round
3	Chelsea	42	21	13	8	70	50	1.400	55	Qualification for the Cup Winners' Cup first round (Note: Chelsea qualified for the Cup Winners' Cup first round as the 1969–70 FA Cup winners.)
4	Derby County	42	22	9	11	64	37	1.730	53	Qualification for the Watney Cup (Note: Derby County and Manchester United qualified for the Watney Cup as the two teams with the most goals that hadn't already qualified for a European competition.)
5	Liverpool	42	20	11	11	65	42	1.548	51	Qualification for the Inter-Cities Fairs Cup first round

Source: World Football
Rules for classification: 1) Points; 2) Goal average; 3) Goals scored
(C) Champions

=== League Cup ===
2 September 1969 2nd Round	Coventry City	0–1	Chelsea	Coventry
			Hutchinson 50'	Stadium: Highfield Road; Attendance: 24,790

24 September 1969 3rd Round	Leeds United	1–1	Chelsea	Leeds
	Madeley 90'		Birchenall 71'	Stadium: Elland Road; Attendance: 21,933

6 October 1969 3rd Round Replay	Chelsea	2–0	Leeds United	London
	Cooke 63'; Birchenall 78'			Stadium: Stamford Bridge; Attendance: 38,485

15 October 1969 4th Round	Carlisle United	1–0	Chelsea	Carlisle
	Hemstead 79'			Stadium: Brunton Park; Attendance: 18,513

=== FA Cup ===
3 January 1970 3rd Round	Chelsea	3–0	Birmingham City	London
	Osgood 42'; Hutchinson 78', 89'			Stadium: Stamford Bridge; Attendance: 45,088

24 January 1970 4th Round	Chelsea	2–2	Burnley	London
	Hollins 67'; Osgood 69'		Dobson 80', 88'	Stadium: Stamford Bridge; Attendance: 42,282

27 January 1970 4th Round Replay	Burnley	1–3 (a.e.t.)	Chelsea	Burnley
	Coates 35'		Houseman 72', 116'; Baldwin 92'	Stadium: Turf Moor; Attendance: 32,000

7 February 1970 5th Round	Crystal Palace	1–4	Chelsea	London
	Hoy 52'		Osgood 37'; Dempsey 64'; Houseman 73'; Hutchinson 86'	Stadium: Selhurst Park; Attendance: 48,479

21 February 1970 6th Round	Queens Park Rangers	2–4	Chelsea	London
	Venables 27' (pen.); Bridges 62'		Webb 7'; Osgood 8', 43', 58'	Stadium: Loftus Road; Attendance: 33,572

14 March 1970 Semi-Final	Chelsea	5–1	Watford	London
	Webb 3'; Osgood 58'; Houseman 73', 79'; Hutchinson 75'		Garbett 12'	Stadium: White Hart Lane; Attendance: 55,209

11 April 1970 Final	Chelsea	2–2 (a.e.t.)	Leeds United	London
	Houseman 41'; Hutchinson 86'		Charlton 21'; Jones 83'	Stadium: Wembley; Attendance: 100,000

29 April 1970 Final Replay	Chelsea	2–1 (a.e.t.)	Leeds United	Manchester
	Osgood 78'; Webb 104'		Jones 36'	Stadium: Old Trafford; Attendance: 62,078
