= 1970–71 Chelsea F.C. season =

English football club season

Chelsea
1970–71 season
- Chairman: Brian Mears
- Manager: Dave Sexton
- First Division: 6th
- FA Cup: Fourth round
- League Cup: Fourth round
- UEFA Cup Winners' Cup: Winners
- FA Charity Shield: Runners-up
- Top goalscorer: League: Keith Weller (13); All: Keith Weller (14)
- Highest home attendance: 61,277 vs Tottenham Hotspur (14 November 1970)
- Lowest home attendance: 14,356 vs Burnley (26 April 1971)
Home colours	Away colours

The 1970–71 season was Chelsea Football Club's 57th of competitive football, and their 44th in the English top flight.

== Squad statistics ==
Pos.	Name	League		FA Cup		League Cup		Cup Winners' Cup		Charity Shield		Total	
Pos.	Name	Apps	Goals	Apps	Goals	Apps	Goals	Apps	Goals	Apps	Goals	Apps	Goals
GK	(England) Peter Bonetti	28	0	3	0	4	0	6	0	1	0	42	0
GK	(Wales) John Phillips	14	0	0	0	0	0	4	0	0	0	18	0
DF	(Republic of Ireland) John Dempsey	31(2)	1	1(1)	0	2	0	7	1	0	0	41(3)	2
DF	(England) Micky Droy	4(1)	0	1	0	0	0	0	0	0	0	5(1)	0
DF	(England) Ron Harris	38	1	3	0	4	0	10	0	1	0	56	1
DF	(England) Marvin Hinton	20	1	3	0	2	0	3	1	1	0	29	2
DF	(Scotland) Stewart Houston	0	0	0	0	1(1)	0	0	0	0	0	1(1)	0
DF	(Scotland) Eddie McCreadie	14(1)	0	2	0	0	0	0	0	0	0	16	0
DF	(Republic of Ireland) Paddy Mulligan	17(1)	1	0	0	3	0	6(1)	0	1	0	27	1
DF	(England) David Webb	34	4	3	0	4	1	10	1	1	0	52	1
MF	(Scotland) John Boyle	20(1)	0	3	0	1	0	6(2)	0	0	0	30(3)	0
MF	(Scotland) Charlie Cooke	31(3)	1	3	0	3	0	8	0	0	0	45(3)	1
MF	(England) Alan Hudson	34(1)	3	0	0	1	0	9	0	1	0	45(1)	3
MF	(England) John Hollins	40	6	3	0	4	1	8	2	1	0	56	9
MF	(England) Peter Houseman	37(1)	4	3	1	4	0	9	1	1	0	54(1)	6
MF/FW	(England) Keith Weller	36(4)	13	3	0	3	1	8(1)	0	1	0	51(5)	14
MF/FW	(England) Tommy Baldwin	18	2	2	2	2	1	7(3)	2	0	0	29(3)	7
FW	(England) Peter Feely	2	1	0	0	0	0	0	0	0	0	2	1
FW	(England) Ian Hutchinson	20	3	1	0	3	1	3	3	1	1	28	8
FW	(England) Peter Osgood	27	5	3	1	3	2	8	4	1	0	42	12
FW	(South Africa) Derek Smethurst	12	3	0	0	0	0	3(1)	1	0	0	16(1)	4

- Substitute appearances in parentheses. Substitute appearances included in totals

== Results ==
=== First Division ===
Date	Opponent	Venue	Result	Attendance	Scorers
15 August 1970	Derby County	H	2–1	46,969	Hutchinson (2)
19 August 1970	Manchester United	A	0–0	50,979	
22 August 1970	West Ham United	A	2–0	39,240	Weller (2)
26 August 1970	Everton	H	2–2	48,195	Mulligan, Hollins
29 August 1970	Arsenal	H	2–1	53,722	Mulligan, Hollins
1 September 1970	Burnley	A	0–0	14,543	
5 September 1970	Leeds United	A	0–1	47,662	
12 September 1970	Wolverhampton Wanderers	H	2–2	34,889	Harris, Hutchinson
19 September 1970	Coventry City	A	1–0	29,328	Hollins
26 September 1970	Ipswich Town	H	2–1	38,541	Hudson, Osgood
3 October 1970	Liverpool	A	0–1	46,196	
10 October 1971	Manchester City	H	1–1	51,903	Weller
17 October 1970	Derby County	A	2–1	35,166	Weller (2)
24 October 1970	Blackpool	A	4–3	24,940	Webb, Weller (2), Hatton (o.g.)
31 October 1970	Southampton	H	2–2	44,843	Hollins, Webb
7 November 1970	Huddersfield Town	A	1–0	24,631	Baldwin
14 November 1970	Tottenham Hotspur	H	0–2	61,277	
21 November 1970	Stoke City	H	2–1	36,227	Osgood, Bernard (o.g.)
28 November 1970	West Bromwich Albion	A	2–2	29,374	Weller, Cooke
5 December 1970	Newcastle United	H	1–0	39,413	Weller
12 December 1970	Nottingham Forest	A	1–1	20,080	Weller
19 December 1970	West Ham United	H	2–1	42,075	Osgood (2)
9 January 1971	Manchester United	H	1–2	53,482	Hudson
13 January 1971	Crystal Palace	A	0–0	40,489	
16 January 1971	Everton	A	0–3	43,648	
30 January 1971	West Bromwich Albion	H	4–1	26,874	Hollins (2), Hutchinson, Smethurst
6 February 1971	Newcastle United	A	1–0	34,366	Hudson
13 February 1971	Wolverhampton Wanderers	A	0–1	34,110	
17 February 1971	Nottingham Forest	H	2–0	19,339	Hollins, O'Kane (o.g.)
20 February 1971	Stoke City	A	2–1	26,959	Smethurst, Hutchinson
27 February 1971	Southampton	A	0–0	29,937	
6 March 1971	Blackpool	H	2–0	26,530	Baldwin, Webb
13 March 1971	Tottenham Hotspur	A	1–2	49,292	Weller
20 March 1971	Huddersfield Town	H	0–0	28,207	
27 March 1971	Leeds United	H	3–1	58,452	Osgood, Houseman (2)
3 April 1971	Arsenal	A	0–2	62,087	
10 April 1971	Crystal Palace	H	1–1	38,953	Webb
12 April 1971	Liverpool	H	1–0	38,705	Lindsay (o.g.)
17 April 1971	Manchester City	A	1–1	26,120	Weller
24 April 1971	Coventry City	H	2–1	27,517	Smethurst, Feely
26 April 1971	Burnley	H	0–1	14,356	
1 May 1971	Ipswich Town	A	0–0	24,708	

Pos	Team	Pld	W	D	L	GF	GA	GAv	Pts	Qualification or relegation
4	Wolverhampton Wanderers	42	22	8	12	64	54	1.185	52	Qualification for the UEFA Cup first round
5	Liverpool	42	17	17	8	42	24	1.750	51	Qualification for the European Cup Winners' Cup first round (Note: Liverpool qualified for the European Cup Winners' Cup as FA Cup runners-up, as winners, Arsenal, qualified for the European Cup.)
6	Chelsea	42	18	15	9	52	42	1.238	51	Qualification for the European Cup Winners' Cup first round (Note: Chelsea qualified for the European Cup Winners' Cup as the 1970-71 European Cup Winners' Cup winners.)
7	Southampton	42	17	12	13	56	44	1.273	46	Qualification for the UEFA Cup first round
8	Manchester United	42	16	11	15	65	66	0.985	43	Qualification for the Watney Cup (Note: Manchester United and West Bromwich Albion qualified for the Watney Cup as the two teams with the most goals that hadn't already qualified for a European competition.)

Source: World Football
Rules for classification: 1) Points; 2) Goal average; 3) Goals scored

=== FA Charity Shield ===
Date	Round	Opponent	Venue	Result	Attendance	Scorers
8 August 1970	-	Everton	H	1–2	43,547	Hutchinson

=== League Cup ===
Date	Round	Opponent	Venue	Result	Attendance	Scorers
9 September 1970	R2	Sheffield Wednesday	A	1–1	15,869	Osgood
22 September 1970	R2 (R)	Sheffield Wednesday	H	2–1	26,646	Webb, Osgood (pen.)
7 October 1970	R3	Middlesbrough	H	3–2	28,597	Weller, Baldwin, Hutchinson
28 October 1970	R4	Manchester United	A	1–2	47,565	Hollins

=== UEFA Cup Winner's Cup ===
Date	Round	Opponent	Venue	Result	Attendance	Scorers
16 September 1970	R1	Aris Salonika	A	1–1	50,000	Hutchinson
30 September 1970	R1	Aris Salonika	H	5–1	40,425	Hollins (2), Hinton, Hutchinson (2)
21 October 1970	R2	CSKA Sofia	A	1–0	45,000	Baldwin
4 November 1970	R2	CSKA Sofia	H	1–0	41,613	Webb
10 March 1971	QF	Club Brugge	A	0–2	23,000	
24 March 1971	QF	Club Brugge	H	4–0 (a.e.t.)	45,558	Baldwin, Osgood (2), Houseman
14 April 1971	SF	Manchester City	H	1–0	45,595	Smethurst
28 April 1971	SF	Manchester City	A	1–0	43,663	Healey (o.g.)
19 May 1971	F	Real Madrid	N	1–1 (a.e.t.)	45,000	Osgood
21 May 1971	F	Real Madrid	N	2–1	24,000	Dempsey, Osgood

=== FA Cup ===
Date	Round	Opponent	Venue	Result	Attendance	Scorers
2 January 1971	R3	Crystal Palace	A	2–2	42,123	Baldwin, Osgood
6 January 1971	R3 (R)	Crystal Palace	H	2–0	55,074	Baldwin, Houseman
23 January 1971	R4	Manchester City	H	0–3	50,176	
