= 1968–69 Chelsea F.C. season =

English football club season

Chelsea
1968–69 season
- Chairman: Brian Mears
- Manager: Dave Sexton
- First Division: 5th
- FA Cup: Quarter-finals
- League Cup: Third round
- Inter-Cities Fairs Cup: Second round
- Top goalscorer: League: Bobby Tambling (18); All: Bobby Tambling (19)
- Highest home attendance: 60,436 vs Manchester United (15 March 1969)
- Lowest home attendance: 17,639 vs Coventry City (10 March 1969)
Home colours	Away colours

The 1968–69 season was Chelsea Football Club's 55th of competitive football, and their 42nd in the English top flight.

== Results ==
=== First Division ===
Date	Opponent	Venue	Result	Attendance	Scorers
14 August 1968	Nottingham Forest	H	1–1	36,515	Tambling
17 August 1968	West Bromwich Albion	H	3–1	33,766	Baldwin, Tambling (2)
21 August 1968	Newcastle United	A	2–3	39,048	Tambling, Birchenall
24 August 1968	Manchester United	A	4–0	55,114	Baldwin (2), Tambling, Birchenall
28 August 1968	Sheffield Wednesday	H	1–0	33,402	Tambling
31 August 1968	Tottenham Hotspur	H	2–2	48,412	Osgood (pen), Birchenall
7 September 1968	Everton	H	1–1	42,017	Osgood (pen)
10 September 1968	Coventry City	A	1–0	36,217	Osgood
14 September 1968	Queens Park Rangers	A	4–0	26,358	Baldwin (2), Osgood, Birchenall
21 September 1968	West Ham United	H	1–1	58,062	Tambling
28 September 1968	Burnley	A	1–2	14,762	Tambling
5 October 1968	Ipswich Town	H	3–1	31,625	Hollins, Birchenall, Baxter (o.g.)
9 October 1968	Sheffield Wednesday	A	1–1	30,445	Baldwin
12 October 1968	Wolverhampton Wanderers	A	1–1	27,810	Tambling
19 October 1968	Leicester City	H	3–0	33,462	Baldwin (3)
26 October 1968	Stoke City	A	0–2	16,799	
2 November 1968	Manchester City	H	2–0	40,700	Osgood, Baldwin
9 November 1968	Liverpool	A	1–2	47,248	Birchenall
16 November 1968	Southampton	H	2–3	31,325	Baldwin, Birchenall
23 November 1968	Arsenal	A	1–0	45,588	Houseman
30 November 1968	Leeds United	H	1–1	43,286	Osgood
7 December 1968	Sunderland	A	2–3	21,976	Birchenall, Baldwin
14 December 1968	Wolverhampton Wanderers	H	1–1	26,194	Osgood (pen)
21 December 1968	Leicester City	A	4–1	23,597	Osgood (2), Birchenall, Tambling
26 December 1968	Ipswich Town	A	3–1	24,083	Webb (3)
11 January 1969	Manchester City	A	1–4	35,605	Houseman
18 January 1969	Liverpool	H	1–2	52,295	Tambling
1 February 1969	Southampton	A	0–5	28,147	
15 February 1969	Leeds United	A	0–1	35,789	
22 February 1969	Sunderland	H	5–1	29,381	Birchenall, Tambling (4)
5 March 1969	Stoke City	H	1–0	19,856	Webb
8 March 1969	West Bromwich Albion	A	3–0	25,137	Boyle, Hutchinson, Houseman
10 March 1969	Coventry City	H	2–1	17,639	Tambling, Hutchinson
15 March 1969	Manchester United	H	3–2	60,436	Webb, Tambling, Hutchinson
22 March 1969	Tottenham Hotspur	A	0–1	47,349	
29 March 1969	Everton	A	2–1	42,190	Birchenall, Hutchinson
4 April 1969	Newcastle United	H	1–1	42,078	Hutchinson
5 April 1969	Burnley	H	2–3	30,266	Hollins, Tambling
8 April 1969	Nottingham Forest	A	2–1	30,413	Birchenall, Hutchinson
12 April 1969	West Ham United	A	0–0	32,332	
14 April 1969	Arsenal	H	2–1	37,890	Webb, Baldwin
19 April 1969	Queens Park Rangers	H	2–1	41,263	Baldwin (2)

Pos	Team	Pld	W	D	L	GF	GA	GAv	Pts	Qualification or relegation
3	Everton	42	21	15	6	77	36	2.139	57	
4	Arsenal	42	22	12	8	56	27	2.074	56	Qualification for the Inter-Cities Fairs Cup first round (Note: Everton were ineligible to participate in the Inter-Cities Fairs Cup as Liverpool had already qualified. Under the rules of the cup, only one team per city could participate. Arsenal took their place as the highest-ranked team that had not already qualified for a European competition.)
5	Chelsea	42	20	10	12	73	53	1.377	50	
6	Tottenham Hotspur	42	14	17	11	61	51	1.196	45	
7	Southampton	42	16	13	13	57	48	1.188	45	Qualification for the Inter-Cities Fairs Cup first round (Note: Chelsea and Tottenham Hotspur were ineligible to participate in the Inter-Cities Fairs Cup as Arsenal had already qualified. Under the rules of the cup, only one team per city could participate. Southampton took their place as the highest-ranked team that had not already qualified for a European competition.)

Source: World Football
Rules for classification: 1) Points; 2) Goal average; 3) Goals scored

=== FA Cup ===
Date	Round	Opponent	Venue	Result	Attendance	Scorers
4 January 1969	3	Carlisle United	H	2–0	37,322	Osgood, Tambling
25 January 1969	4	Preston North End	A	0–0	31,875	
3 February 1969	4 (R)	Preston North End	H	2–1	36,522	Webb, Cooke
12 February 1969	5	Stoke City	H	3–2	39,191	Osgood (2), Birchenall
1 March 1969	QF	West Bromwich Albion	H	1–2	52,285	Webb

=== League Cup ===
Date	Round	Opponent	Venue	Result	Attendance	Scorers
3 September 1968	2	Birmingham City	A	1–0	31,560	Foster (o.g.)
25 September 1968	3	Derby County	H	0–0	26,975	
2 October 1968	3 (R)	Derby County	A	1–3	34,463	Birchenall

=== Fairs Cup ===
Date	Round	Opponent	Venue	Result	Attendance	Scorers
18 September 1968	1	Greenock Morton	H	5–0	28,736	Hollins, Boyle, Cooke, Osgood, Birchenall
30 September 1968	1	Greenock Morton	A	4–3	8,000	Baldwin, Tambling, Birchenall, Houseman
23 October 1968	2	DWS	H	0–0	28,428	
30 October 1968	2	DWS	A	0–0	14,000	
30 October 1968		DWS	Chelsea lost on coin toss			
