= Chelsea F.C.–Leeds United F.C. rivalry =

Football rivalry

Chelsea v Leeds United
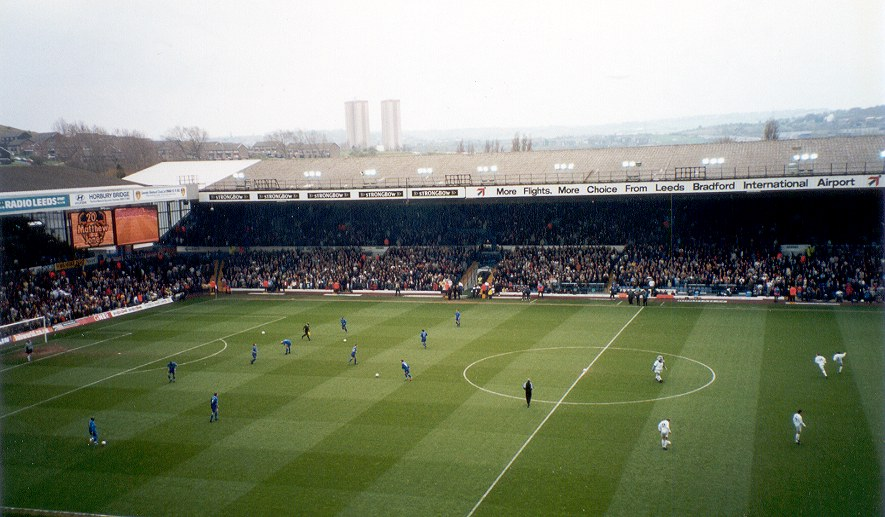
- Leeds United and Chelsea in action at Elland Road on 1 April 2000.
- Location: London and West Yorkshire
- Teams: Chelsea; Leeds United
- First meeting: 10 December 1927; Second Division; Leeds United 5–0 Chelsea
- Latest meeting: 21 November 2026; Premier League; Chelsea 1–4 Leeds United
- Next meeting: 25 January 2027; Premier League; Leeds United v Chelsea
- Stadiums: Stamford Bridge (Chelsea); Elland Road (Leeds United)

Statistics
- Total meetings: 114
- Most wins: Leeds United (42)
- All-time series: Chelsea: 41; Drawn: 31; Leeds United: 42
- Largest victory: Leeds United 7–0 Chelsea (7 October 1967)

The rivalry between Chelsea and Leeds United is a football rivalry between London-based club Chelsea and Yorkshire-based Leeds United. The rivalry first emerged in the 1960s after a series of fiercely contested and controversial matches, when the two clubs were frequently involved in the pursuit of domestic and European honours culminating in the 1970 FA Cup final, which is regarded as one of the most physical matches in English football history.

The perceived contrast between the clubs also fuelled the rivalry, summed up as "Yorkshire grit versus flash Cockney." The rivalry between the clubs often spilled out onto the terraces: at the height of British football hooliganism in the 1970s and 1980s, Chelsea's Headhunters and Leeds' Service Crew were among the most notorious football firms and had numerous violent encounters with each other. Hooliganism has been effectively curtailed since the 1990s and the rivalry has since declined.

In the Official Chelsea Biography, Leeds were cited as one of Chelsea's major rivalries. However, Leeds' relegation from the Premier League in 2004 had effectively ended the rivalry; the clubs only met once in sixteen years afterwards. The clubs met again in the 2020–21 Premier League season, as Leeds United was promoted after winning the EFL Championship in 2019–20. The first such meeting ended in a 3–1 Chelsea victory at Stamford Bridge on 5 December 2020, and evidence of the rivalry resurfaced. In the 2003 Football Fans Census, while Leeds fans named Chelsea as their second-biggest rivals, behind Manchester United, Chelsea fans consider Arsenal to be their main rivals, followed by a rivalry with Tottenham Hotspur and Manchester United.

== History ==
It always rears its ugly head, even when we're nowhere near them. As predictably as the late plod of Corporal Jones' foot, when Leeds fans gather in any stand, they will sing their song about their Cockney rivals. 'Fetch your father's gun and shoot the Chelsea scum'. Chelsea fans still sometimes reciprocate with an elegy to the hatred of Leeds over the tune of 'The Dambusters March'.

— Chelsea historian Rick Glanvill

=== Early years ===
Chelsea were founded in 1905, Leeds United in 1919. Both teams flitted between the First and Second Divisions in their early years, and neither won a major trophy prior to World War II. The clubs first met in a competitive match in the Second Division on 10 December 1927; Leeds won 5–0. Leeds also won 3–2 in the return fixture at Stamford Bridge that season to clinch promotion back to Division One. In 1952, they contested a gruelling fifth round FA Cup tie which took three matches to produce a winner, Chelsea eventually prevailed 5–1 in a second replay at Villa Park. An aggregate crowd of almost 150,000 watched the three matches and such was the fearsome tackling on display, Chelsea had to make seven changes to their line-up for a subsequent match.

=== 1960s ===
It was in the 1960s that a significant rivalry first emerged between the clubs. Under the management of Don Revie, Leeds became a force in English football for the first time, capped by winning the league title in 1969. Chelsea, too, had enjoyed a renaissance under Tommy Docherty and also challenged for honours in the 1960s. Over the next decade, they would meet in numerous important, and fiercely contested, matches. Chelsea goalkeeper Peter Bonetti opined that the rivalry between the teams emerged because "Leeds had a name, a reputation as being dirty... [and] We matched them in the physical side of things because we had our own players who were physical... We weren't unalike in the way we played." Tommy Baldwin said, "There were a lot of scores being settled from previous games whenever we played them. It always just seemed to go mad, with everyone kicking each other." Norman Hunter said that he and Chelsea striker Peter Osgood shared a "tremendous rivalry." It was often rumoured that Osgood was top of the list in Jack Charlton's infamous "black book" of players he intended to exact revenge on, although Charlton himself stated that it was actually another, unnamed, Chelsea player. Johnny Giles recalled the "special sort of animosity" between the teams and his "previous" with Eddie McCreadie.

The rivalry was also fuelled by the traditional North-South divide in England, and by the clubs having markedly different images and philosophies. Chelsea were associated with the fashionable King's Road and celebrities like Raquel Welch and Steve McQueen. Leeds were perceived as a cynical, albeit talented, side with a style which some observers regarded as "dirty." Damien Blake of When Saturday Comes wrote that "Chelsea were The Beatles (attractive, clean-cut, fashionable) to Leeds' Stones (surly, violent, sexy, going out with Marianne Faithfull)" According to John King, "Leeds were... portrayed as dour Yorkshiremen with a reputation for playing dirty... Chelsea, on the other hand, were the wide boys of London, dedicated followers of fashion. While Leeds were drinking tea and playing cards, Chelsea were out boozing and chasing girls [but] when it came to games between the two, however, war was declared."

In 1964–65, Chelsea and Leeds had a three way tussle for the league title with Manchester United and met in a league match at Stamford Bridge in September 1964. The Yorkshire Evening Post's reporter observed that "'Never mind the ball' seemed to be the order of the day as scything, irresponsible tackles ruffled tempers." Bobby Collins "viciously" retaliated against Ron Harris and a McCreadie tackle on Giles resulted in Giles leaving the field on a stretcher, reducing Leeds to ten men for the remainder of the match. In 1966, the teams met in an FA Cup fourth round tie, where a crowd of 57,000 saw Chelsea win 1–0 with a goal from Bobby Tambling, a game in which "the young Chelsea team withstood an almost continuous battering from Leeds."

The rivalry intensified when they met in the FA Cup again a year later, this time a semi-final at Villa Park, which Chelsea won 1–0. In a game with "frighteningly ruthless" tackling, Leeds goalkeeper Gary Sprake kicked Chelsea midfielder John Boyle in the face as they challenged for a high ball, a grudge which still remained when the teams met in the FA Cup final three years later. Further controversy came when Leeds had two late goals disallowed; a Terry Cooper strike was ruled out for offside, and a long range Peter Lorimer goal was disallowed because a free kick had been taken too quickly. Opinions on the offside decision were mixed, although Docherty conceded he would not have complained had the second goal been allowed to stand. Six months later, Leeds gained revenge by beating managerless Chelsea (Docherty had resigned the previous day) 7–0 at Elland Road, their biggest ever win in the fixture.

=== 1970s ===
The clubs met six times during the 1969–70 season. Leeds won both league games, 2–0 at Elland Road and 5–2 at Stamford Bridge. The match at Elland Road on 20 September 1969 continued in the same vein as previous encounters. A Yorkshire Post journalist lamented the many "late and early tackles" and condemned the teams for playing "venomously". During the match Allan Clarke, Jack Charlton, David Webb, Peter Houseman, Ron Harris and Alan Birchenall all suffered injuries that ruled them out of subsequent matches. Chelsea gained a measure of revenge by knocking Leeds out of the League Cup after a replay. The teams also met in the 1970 FA Cup final, the game which cemented the rivalry.

Chelsea and Leeds contested the FA Cup final at Wembley on 11 April 1970. Leeds were generally regarded as the better team on the day and led twice but a late Chelsea equaliser from Ian Hutchinson took the game to a replay, the first in an FA Cup final since 1912. The replay at Old Trafford attracted a UK television audience of 28 million, making it the sixth most-watched television broadcast in British history. It is regarded as one of the dirtiest football matches ever. Harris was detailed to mark Wembley Man of the Match Eddie Gray; a series of Harris fouls during the first half effectively immobilised the Scot. Elsewhere, Charlton kneed and headbutted Osgood, Hunter and Hutchinson traded punches, and Eddie McCreadie flattened Billy Bremner with a "kung fu" challenge. Bonetti was injured after being bundled into the net by Jones and limped through the rest of the match with a heavily bandaged knee.

Modern day referee David Elleray reviewed the match years later and concluded that he would have issued six red cards and twenty yellow cards. However, referee Eric Jennings booked only one player – Hutchinson – over the two games. Hugh McIlvanney wrote that "at times it appeared that Mr Jennings would give a free kick only on production of a death certificate". Mick Jones put Leeds ahead again, but Osgood equalised with 12 minutes remaining and Chelsea eventually prevailed 2–1 after extra time. Charlton was so angry at the loss that he left the pitch without collecting his runners-up medal. Charlton later said: "It wasn't the losing of the game, it was the losing of the game to Chelsea, because there were never two more competitive sides when we played each other over a period of four or five years." The match has been cited as one of the greatest FA Cup finals.

The animosity continued into the 1970s. Geoffrey Green of The Times reported that a hard-fought 0–0 draw at Stamford Bridge in December 1971 at times "more resembled some Mafia vendetta than football". A crowd of 51,000 (with a further 9,000 locked out) watched a 4–0 Chelsea win over Leeds in the opening match of the 1972–73 season. The match was "marred by a string of infringements"; Trevor Cherry, Chris Garland and Terry Yorath were all booked, and Leeds lost David Harvey and Mick Jones to injury. Crowd trouble and pitch invasions led Chelsea to erect wire fences around the terraces.

=== 1980–present ===
By the end of the 1970s both clubs were in decline, and spent many of the ensuing years in the Second Division. Chelsea were relegated in 1975 and again in 1979. Leeds were relegated in 1982, and did not regain their First Division status for eight years. No longer challenging for trophies (but frequently competing for promotion), the rivalry often continued off the pitch in the form of hooliganism. When the teams met in the Second Division in the 1982–83 season, their first match for four seasons, 153 Leeds and Chelsea hooligans were arrested after fighting broke out at Piccadilly Circus tube station on the London Underground, and another 60 were arrested at the match itself. In April 1984, when Chelsea beat Leeds 5–0 to clinch promotion to the First Division, Chelsea fans invaded the pitch several times, and Leeds fans smashed up the Stamford Bridge scoreboard. Clashes between rival fans resulted in 41 arrests. More recently, before a Chelsea-Leeds match in 2002, the Leeds manager David O'Leary urged fans to behave after recent crowd trouble at other matches although stricter policing and the introduction of CCTV in grounds and all-seater stadia in the 1990s reduced crowd trouble at matches.

Both clubs enjoyed another revival in the 1990s, which coincided with a series of "ill-tempered and highly-charged" clashes as "the mutual loathing that characterized these sides three decades ago...resurfaced." In an "X-rated" 0–0 draw in December 1997, eight players were booked and Leeds had two players – Gary Kelly and Alf-Inge Haaland – sent off. Martin Lipton called the match "a throwback to the worst excesses of the Revie era when the likes of Chopper Harris kicked lumps out of Johnny Giles and Co." Another 0–0 draw in October 1998 resulted in 12 yellow cards and a red card for Chelsea's Frank Leboeuf. In a 2–0 Leeds win at Stamford Bridge in December 1999, Leeds's Lee Bowyer was booked a minute into the game and Leboeuf was again sent off. A bad tempered League Cup fourth round match in November 2001 – their first cup clash since 1970 – saw Chelsea win 2–0, with Eiður Guðjohnsen scoring a goal while Stephen McPhail was on the ground injured. Graeme Le Saux was later stretchered off after being hit in the face by Alan Smith.

The clubs did not meet in the league after Leeds's relegation from the Premier League in the 2003–04 season until their promotion from the EFL Championship in the 2019–20. Their last meeting before this period took place on 15 May 2004, with Chelsea winning 1–0. The animosity between the clubs was still expressed in the hostility of Leeds fans to the club being taken over by former Chelsea owner and chairman Ken Bates, and to the appointment of former Chelsea captain Dennis Wise as manager in 2006, resulting in chants like "Get the Chelsea out of Leeds." Gus Poyet, another former Chelsea player who served as Wise's assistant at Leeds, later commented that "the fans didn't want us there because of the rivalry with Chelsea."

The clubs were drawn to play each other in the League Cup in December 2012 at Elland Road, which was the first competitive meeting between them in eight years. After a goal by Leeds striker Luciano Becchio which put the West Yorkshire side ahead in the first half, Chelsea responded by scoring five in the second half, to win 5–1. Due to police concerns over potential crowd trouble, Chelsea were allocated only 3000 tickets rather than the usual 5000. The match drew a gate of 33,816, Leeds's highest attendance for two years.

The clubs met again in the 2020–21 Premier League season following Leeds's promotion from the Championship. Their first match ended 3–1 to Chelsea, and the reverse fixture ended in a 0–0 draw at Elland Road.

The two teams' encounter in the 2022–23 Premier League ended in a 3–0 win to Leeds at Elland Road, their first win against Chelsea since 2002.

== Notable matches ==
- Leeds United 7–0 Chelsea (7 October 1967)

Six months after the heated FA Cup semi-final at Villa Park, Leeds notched their biggest ever win over Chelsea. Chelsea entered the match in turmoil, their manager Tommy Docherty having resigned the day before. Albert Johanneson opened the scoring after five minutes and Leeds were 3–0 up within 14 minutes thanks to further goals from Jimmy Greenhoff and Jack Charlton. Peter Lorimer put Leeds 4–0 ahead by half-time. After the break, Eddie Gray beat Bonetti from outside the area, Marvin Hinton scored an own goal and Leeds captain Billy Bremner capped his man of the match performance by scoring the seventh himself.

- Chelsea 5–0 Leeds United (28 April 1984)

In the Second Division, John Neal's high-flying Chelsea met mid-table Leeds, managed by Eddie Gray and fielding two survivors from the 1970 FA Cup Final, David Harvey and Peter Lorimer, knowing a win would secure promotion to the First Division for the first time since 1979. In Chelsea's first win over Leeds since 1972, winger Mickey Thomas put Chelsea ahead, Kerry Dixon scored a "perfect" hat-trick and Paul Canoville completed the win with a goal in stoppage time. At the end of the match Chelsea fans invaded the pitch, while Leeds fans trashed the scoreboard.

- Leeds United 1–5 Chelsea (19 December 2012)

Chelsea and Leeds' first game against each other in eight years was in League Cup quarter finals in the 2012–13 season. Chelsea were in the Premier League at this time and Leeds were in the Championship. Chelsea ran out winners after going behind to a Luciano Becchio goal eight minutes before half time, however Juan Mata's goal one minute after half time set Chelsea on their way to the last four. Branislav Ivanović, Victor Moses, Eden Hazard and Fernando Torres wrapped up victory for the Blues.

- Leeds United 3–0 Chelsea (21 August 2022)

Leeds’ first victory against Chelsea since their return to the Premier League in 2020 was a memorable one as they continued their fine unbeaten start to the season with a crushing victory at Elland Road. New summer signing Brenden Aaronson began the scoring as he capitalised on a mistake from Chelsea goalkeeper, Edouard Mendy. Soon after, Leeds went two in front after Spanish striker Rodrigo headed in a Jack Harrison free kick. The two players combined again in the second half with Rodrigo teeing up Harrison to smash home from close-range to make it 3–0. Chelsea’s summer signing Kalidou Koulibaly was sent off for a second bookable offence to complete Chelsea’s misery.

== Statistics ==
Chelsea's traditional kit of royal blue and white
Leeds' traditional all-white kit

=== Head-to-head summary ===
As of 21 November 2026

| Competition | Matches | Chelsea wins | Draws | Leeds United wins | Chelsea goals | Leeds United goals |
|---|---|---|---|---|---|---|
| League | 99 | 30 | 27 | 42 | 121 | 151 |
| FA Cup | 10 | 7 | 3 | 0 | 21 | 8 |
| League Cup | 5 | 4 | 1 | 0 | 16 | 5 |
| Total | 114 | 41 | 31 | 42 | 158 | 164 |

=== Scorelines ===
- Biggest wins:
  - Chelsea 7–1 Leeds United (16 March 1935)
  - Leeds United 7–0 Chelsea (7 October 1967)

== Head-to-head results ==
| Date | Home team | Score | Away team | Venue | Competition | H2H |
|---|---|---|---|---|---|---|
| 10 Dec 1927 | Leeds United | 5–0 | Chelsea | Elland Road | Second Division | +1 |
| 21 Apr 1928 | Chelsea | 2–3 | Leeds United | Stamford Bridge | Second Division | +2 |
| 22 Nov 1930 | Leeds United | 2–3 | Chelsea | Elland Road | First Division | +1 |
| 28 Mar 1931 | Chelsea | 1–0 | Leeds United | Stamford Bridge | First Division | 0 |
| 26 Nov 1932 | Leeds United | 2–0 | Chelsea | Elland Road | First Division | +1 |
| 8 Apr 1933 | Chelsea | 6–0 | Leeds United | Stamford Bridge | First Division | 0 |
| 23 Dec 1933 | Chelsea | 1–1 | Leeds United | Stamford Bridge | First Division | 0 |
| 5 May 1934 | Leeds United | 3–1 | Chelsea | Elland Road | First Division | +1 |
| 3 Nov 1934 | Leeds United | 5–2 | Chelsea | Elland Road | First Division | +2 |
| 16 Mar 1935 | Chelsea | 7–1 | Leeds United | Stamford Bridge | First Division | +1 |
| 14 Sep 1935 | Chelsea | 1–0 | Leeds United | Stamford Bridge | First Division | 0 |
| 18 Jan 1936 | Leeds United | 2–0 | Chelsea | Elland Road | First Division | +1 |
| 29 Aug 1936 | Leeds United | 2–3 | Chelsea | Elland Road | First Division | 0 |
| 26 Dec 1936 | Chelsea | 2–1 | Leeds United | Stamford Bridge | First Division | +1 |
| 16 Jan 1937 | Chelsea | 4–0 | Leeds United | Stamford Bridge | FA Cup | +2 |
| 1 Sep 1937 | Leeds United | 2–0 | Chelsea | Elland Road | First Division | +1 |
| 8 Sep 1937 | Chelsea | 4–1 | Leeds United | Stamford Bridge | First Division | +2 |
| 26 Dec 1938 | Leeds United | 1–1 | Chelsea | Elland Road | First Division | +2 |
| 27 Dec 1938 | Chelsea | 2–2 | Leeds United | Stamford Bridge | First Division | +2 |
| 14 Sep 1946 | Chelsea | 3–0 | Leeds United | Stamford Bridge | First Division | +3 |
| 18 Jan 1947 | Leeds United | 2–1 | Chelsea | Elland Road | First Division | +2 |
| 23 Feb 1952 | Leeds United | 1–1 | Chelsea | Elland Road | FA Cup | +2 |
| 27 Feb 1952 | Chelsea | 1–1 | Leeds United | Stamford Bridge | FA Cup | +2 |
| 3 Mar 1952 | Leeds United | 1–5 | Chelsea | Villa Park | FA Cup | +3 |
| 1 Sep 1956 | Leeds United | 0–0 | Chelsea | Elland Road | First Division | +3 |
| 29 Dec 1956 | Chelsea | 1–1 | Leeds United | Stamford Bridge | First Division | +3 |
| 7 Dec 1957 | Chelsea | 2–1 | Leeds United | Stamford Bridge | First Division | +4 |
| 19 Apr 1958 | Leeds United | 0–0 | Chelsea | Elland Road | First Division | +4 |
| 8 Nov 1958 | Chelsea | 2–0 | Leeds United | Stamford Bridge | First Division | +5 |
| 28 Mar 1959 | Leeds United | 4–0 | Chelsea | Elland Road | First Division | +4 |
| 12 Sep 1959 | Leeds United | 2–1 | Chelsea | Elland Road | First Division | +3 |
| 23 Jan 1960 | Chelsea | 1–3 | Leeds United | Stamford Bridge | First Division | +2 |
| 15 Sep 1962 | Leeds United | 2–0 | Chelsea | Elland Road | Second Division | +1 |
| 30 Apr 1963 | Chelsea | 2–2 | Leeds United | Stamford Bridge | Second Division | +1 |
| 19 Sep 1964 | Chelsea | 2–0 | Leeds United | Stamford Bridge | First Division | +2 |
| 23 Jan 1965 | Leeds United | 2–2 | Chelsea | Elland Road | First Division | +2 |
| 6 Nov 1965 | Chelsea | 1–0 | Leeds United | Stamford Bridge | First Division | +3 |
| 12 Feb 1966 | Chelsea | 1–0 | Leeds United | Stamford Bridge | FA Cup | +4 |
| 4 Apr 1966 | Leeds United | 2–0 | Chelsea | Elland Road | First Division | +3 |
| 1 Apr 1967 | Leeds United | 1–0 | Chelsea | Elland Road | First Division | +2 |
| 29 Apr 1967 | Chelsea | 1–0 | Leeds United | Villa Park | FA Cup | +3 |
| 6 May 1967 | Chelsea | 2–2 | Leeds United | Stamford Bridge | First Division | +3 |
| 7 Oct 1967 | Leeds United | 7–0 | Chelsea | Elland Road | First Division | +2 |
| 20 Mar 1968 | Chelsea | 0–0 | Leeds United | Stamford Bridge | First Division | +2 |
| 30 Nov 1968 | Chelsea | 1–1 | Leeds United | Stamford Bridge | First Division | +2 |
| 15 Feb 1969 | Leeds United | 1–0 | Chelsea | Elland Road | First Division | +1 |
| 20 Sep 1969 | Leeds United | 2–0 | Chelsea | Elland Road | First Division | 0 |
| 24 Sep 1969 | Leeds United | 1–1 | Chelsea | Elland Road | League Cup | 0 |
| 6 Oct 1969 | Chelsea | 2–0 | Leeds United | Stamford Bridge | League Cup | +1 |
| 10 Jan 1970 | Chelsea | 2–5 | Leeds United | Stamford Bridge | First Division | 0 |
| 11 Apr 1970 | Chelsea | 2–2 | Leeds United | Wembley Stadium | FA Cup | 0 |
| 29 Apr 1970 | Leeds United | 1–2 | Chelsea | Old Trafford | FA Cup | +1 |
| 5 Sep 1970 | Leeds United | 1–0 | Chelsea | Elland Road | First Division | 0 |
| 27 Mar 1971 | Chelsea | 3–1 | Leeds United | Stamford Bridge | First Division | +1 |
| 11 Dec 1971 | Chelsea | 0–0 | Leeds United | Stamford Bridge | First Division | +1 |
| 1 May 1972 | Leeds United | 2–0 | Chelsea | Elland Road | First Division | 0 |
| 12 Aug 1972 | Chelsea | 4–0 | Leeds United | Stamford Bridge | First Division | +1 |
| 17 Feb 1973 | Leeds United | 1–1 | Chelsea | Elland Road | First Division | +1 |
| 15 Dec 1973 | Chelsea | 1–2 | Leeds United | Stamford Bridge | First Division | 0 |
| 2 Feb 1974 | Leeds United | 1–1 | Chelsea | Elland Road | First Division | 0 |
| 30 Nov 1974 | Leeds United | 2–0 | Chelsea | Elland Road | First Division | +1 |
| 18 Jan 1975 | Chelsea | 0–2 | Leeds United | Stamford Bridge | First Division | +2 |
| 1 Oct 1977 | Chelsea | 1–2 | Leeds United | Stamford Bridge | First Division | +3 |
| 25 Feb 1978 | Leeds United | 2–0 | Chelsea | Elland Road | First Division | +4 |
| 2 Sep 1978 | Chelsea | 0–3 | Leeds United | Stamford Bridge | First Division | +5 |
| 22 Nov 1978 | Leeds United | 2–1 | Chelsea | Elland Road | First Division | +6 |
| 9 Oct 1982 | Chelsea | 0–0 | Leeds United | Stamford Bridge | Second Division | +6 |
| 19 Feb 1983 | Leeds United | 3–3 | Chelsea | Elland Road | Second Division | +6 |
| 26 Nov 1983 | Leeds United | 1–1 | Chelsea | Elland Road | Second Division | +6 |
| 24 Apr 1984 | Chelsea | 5–0 | Leeds United | Stamford Bridge | Second Division | +5 |
| 24 Sep 1988 | Leeds United | 0–2 | Chelsea | Elland Road | Second Division | +4 |
| 22 Apr 1989 | Chelsea | 1–0 | Leeds United | Stamford Bridge | Second Division | +3 |
| 26 Dec 1990 | Leeds United | 4–1 | Chelsea | Elland Road | First Division | +4 |
| 30 Mar 1991 | Chelsea | 1–2 | Leeds United | Stamford Bridge | First Division | +5 |
| 14 Sep 1991 | Chelsea | 0–1 | Leeds United | Stamford Bridge | First Division | +6 |
| 11 Apr 1992 | Leeds United | 3–0 | Chelsea | Elland Road | First Division | +7 |
| 29 Nov 1992 | Chelsea | 1–0 | Leeds United | Stamford Bridge | Premier League | +6 |
| 24 Mar 1993 | Leeds United | 1–1 | Chelsea | Elland Road | Premier League | +6 |
| 6 Nov 1993 | Leeds United | 4–1 | Chelsea | Elland Road | Premier League | +7 |
| 23 Apr 1994 | Chelsea | 1–1 | Leeds United | Stamford Bridge | Premier League | +7 |
| 27 Aug 1994 | Leeds United | 2–3 | Chelsea | Elland Road | Premier League | +6 |
| 11 Mar 1995 | Chelsea | 0–3 | Leeds United | Stamford Bridge | Premier League | +7 |
| 18 Nov 1995 | Leeds United | 1–0 | Chelsea | Elland Road | Premier League | +8 |
| 13 Apr 1996 | Chelsea | 4–1 | Leeds United | Stamford Bridge | Premier League | +7 |
| 1 Dec 1996 | Leeds United | 2–0 | Chelsea | Elland Road | Premier League | +8 |
| 3 May 1997 | Chelsea | 0–0 | Leeds United | Stamford Bridge | Premier League | +8 |
| 13 Dec 1997 | Chelsea | 0–0 | Leeds United | Stamford Bridge | Premier League | +8 |
| 8 Apr 1998 | Leeds United | 3–1 | Chelsea | Elland Road | Premier League | +9 |
| 25 Oct 1998 | Leeds United | 0–0 | Chelsea | Elland Road | Premier League | +9 |
| 5 May 1999 | Chelsea | 1–0 | Leeds United | Stamford Bridge | Premier League | +8 |
| 19 Dec 1999 | Chelsea | 0–2 | Leeds United | Stamford Bridge | Premier League | +9 |
| 1 Apr 2000 | Leeds United | 0–1 | Chelsea | Elland Road | Premier League | +8 |
| 12 Nov 2000 | Chelsea | 1–1 | Leeds United | Stamford Bridge | Premier League | +8 |
| 28 Apr 2001 | Leeds United | 2–0 | Chelsea | Elland Road | Premier League | +9 |
| 21 Oct 2001 | Leeds United | 0–0 | Chelsea | Elland Road | Premier League | +9 |
| 28 Nov 2001 | Leeds United | 0–2 | Chelsea | Elland Road | League Cup | +8 |
| 30 Jan 2002 | Chelsea | 2–0 | Leeds United | Stamford Bridge | Premier League | +7 |
| 28 Dec 2002 | Leeds United | 2–0 | Chelsea | Elland Road | Premier League | +8 |
| 28 Jan 2003 | Chelsea | 3–2 | Leeds United | Stamford Bridge | Premier League | +7 |
| 6 Dec 2003 | Leeds United | 1–1 | Chelsea | Elland Road | Premier League | +7 |
| 15 May 2004 | Chelsea | 1–0 | Leeds United | Stamford Bridge | Premier League | +6 |
| 19 Dec 2012 | Leeds United | 1–5 | Chelsea | Elland Road | League Cup | +5 |
| 5 Dec 2020 | Chelsea | 3–1 | Leeds United | Stamford Bridge | Premier League | +4 |
| 13 Mar 2021 | Leeds United | 0–0 | Chelsea | Elland Road | Premier League | +4 |
| 11 Dec 2021 | Chelsea | 3–2 | Leeds United | Stamford Bridge | Premier League | +3 |
| 11 May 2022 | Leeds United | 0–3 | Chelsea | Elland Road | Premier League | +2 |
| 21 Aug 2022 | Leeds United | 3–0 | Chelsea | Elland Road | Premier League | +3 |
| 4 Mar 2023 | Chelsea | 1–0 | Leeds United | Stamford Bridge | Premier League | +2 |
| 2 Feb 2024 | Chelsea | 3–2 | Leeds United | Stamford Bridge | FA Cup | +1 |
| 3 Dec 2025 | Leeds United | 3–1 | Chelsea | Elland Road | Premier League | +2 |
| 10 Feb 2026 | Chelsea | 2–2 | Leeds United | Stamford Bridge | Premier League | +2 |
| 26 Apr 2026 | Chelsea | 1–0 | Leeds United | Wembley | FA Cup | +1 |
| 9 Sep 2026 | Chelsea | 6–3 | Leeds United | Stamford Bridge | EFL Cup | 0 |
| 21 Nov 2026 | Chelsea | 1–4 | Leeds United | Stamford Bridge | Premier League | +1 |

== Honours ==
As of 13 July 2025

| Competition | Chelsea | Leeds United |
|---|---|---|
| First Division / Premier League | 6 | 3 |
| FA Cup | 8 | 1 |
| League Cup | 5 | 1 |
| UEFA Champions League | 2 | 0 |
| UEFA Cup Winners' Cup | 2 | 0 |
| UEFA Europa League | 2 | 0 |
| UEFA Conference League | 1 | 0 |
| Inter-Cities Fairs Cup | 0 | 2 |
| FA Charity / Community Shield | 4 | 2 |
| UEFA Super Cup | 2 | 0 |
| FIFA Club World Cup | 2 | 0 |
| Total | 34 | 9 |

== Player transfers ==
There have been few direct player transfers between Chelsea and Leeds United. The first came in 1991, when left-back Tony Dorigo moved from Chelsea to Leeds for £1.3 million. Chelsea have never bought a senior player from Leeds, although they did controversially sign Leeds youth players Tom Taiwo and Michael Woods in 2006. In 2018, Patrick Bamford moved to Leeds after one season in Middlesbrough, having never played for Chelsea's first team. That summer also saw three Chelsea players loaned out to Leeds: Jamal Blackman, Izzy Brown, and Lewis Baker. At the other hand, former Leeds keeper Robert Green, having been released by Huddersfield Town, moved to Chelsea as the third goalkeeper, behind newly-recruited Kepa Arrizabalaga and Willy Caballero.

Three former Chelsea players have managed Leeds; George Graham (1964–1966; 1996–1998), Terry Venables (1960–1966; 2002–2003) and Dennis Wise (1990–2001; 2006–2008).

| Player | Pos. | Chelsea career span | Leeds United career span |
|---|---|---|---|
| (England) Duncan McKenzie | FW | 1978–1979 | 1974–1976 |
| (Wales) Mickey Thomas | FW | 1984–1985 | 1989–1990 |
| (Wales) Vinnie Jones | MF | 1991–1992 | 1989–1990 |
| (Australia) Tony Dorigo | DF | 1987–1991 | 1991–1997 |
| (England) David Rocastle | MF | 1992–1993 | 1994–1998 |
| (Republic of Ireland) Terry Phelan | DF | 1995–1997 | 1985–1986 |
| (Scotland) David Hopkin | MF | 1992–1995 | 1997–2000 |
| (England) Danny Granville | DF | 1997–1998 | 1998–1999 |
| (England) Michael Duberry | DF | 1993–1999 | 1999–2005 |
| (Netherlands) Jimmy Floyd Hasselbaink | FW | 2000–2004 | 1997–1999 |
| (England) Jody Morris | MF | 1996–2003 | 2003–2004 |
| (England) Neil Sullivan | GK | 2003–2004 | 2004–2007 |
| (Norway) Tore André Flo | FW | 1997–2000 | 2007–2008 |
| (Finland) Mikael Forssell | FW | 1998–2005 | 2011–2012 |
| (England) Patrick Bamford | FW | 2012–2017 | 2018–2025 |
| (England) Jamal Blackman | GK | 2012–2021 | 2018 (loan) |
| (England) Izzy Brown | MF | 2013–2021 | 2018–2019 (loan) |
| (England) Lewis Baker | MF | 2014–2022 | 2018–2019 (loan) |
| (England) Robert Green | GK | 2016–2017 | 2018–2019 |
| (Wales) Ethan Ampadu | MF | 2017–2023 | 2023–present |
| (Argentina) Facundo Buonanotte | MF | 2025–2026 (loan) | 2026 (loan) |
