= 1971–72 Chelsea F.C. season =

English football club season

Chelsea
1971–72 season
- Chairman: Brian Mears
- Manager: Dave Sexton
- Stadium: Stamford Bridge
- First Division: 7th
- FA Cup: Fifth round
- League Cup: Runners-up
- Top goalscorer: League: Peter Osgood (18); All: Peter Osgood (31)
- Highest home attendance: 52,581 vs Tottenham Hotspur (27 November 1971)
- Lowest home attendance: 23,011 vs Plymouth Argyle (8 September 1971)
- Average home league attendance: 38,788
- Biggest win: 6–0 v Bolton Wanderers (8 November 1971)
- Biggest defeat: 0–4 v West Bromwich Albion (27 April 1972)
Home colours	Away colours

The 1971–72 season was Chelsea Football Club's fifty-eighth competitive season.

== League table ==
Pos	Team	Pld	W	D	L	GF	GA	GAv	Pts	Qualification or relegation
5	Arsenal	42	22	8	12	58	40	1.450	52	
6	Tottenham Hotspur	42	19	13	10	63	42	1.500	51	Qualification for the UEFA Cup first round (Note: Tottenham Hotspur qualified for the UEFA Cup as the 1971-72 UEFA Cup winners.)
7	Chelsea	42	18	12	12	58	49	1.184	48	
8	Manchester United	42	19	10	13	69	61	1.131	48	Declined place in Watney Cup
9	Wolverhampton Wanderers	42	18	11	13	65	57	1.140	47	Qualification for the Watney Cup (Note: Wolverhampton Wanderers and Sheffield United qualified for the Watney Cup as the two teams with the most goals that hadn't already qualified for a European competition. (Manchester United would have qualified, but declined their place in the competition.))

Source: World Football
Rules for classification: 1) Points; 2) Goal average; 3) Goals scored

== European Cup Winners' Cup ==
Win Draw Loss

=== First round ===
15 September 1971 First leg	Jeunesse Hautcharage (Luxembourg)	0–8	(England) Chelsea	Luxembourg City, Luxembourg
		Report	Osgood 2', 28', 42'; Houseman 9', 29'; Hollins 37'; Baldwin 74'; Webb 81'	Stadium: Stade Municipal; Attendance: 13,000; Referee: Ferdinand Biwersi (West Germany)

29 September 1971 Second leg	Chelsea (England)	13–0	(Luxembourg) Jeunesse Hautcharage	London, England
	Osgood 4', 6', 63', 81', 85'; Hudson 12'; Hollins 13' (pen.); Webb 22'; Harris 43'; Baldwin 61', 69', 90'; Houseman 78'	Report		Stadium: Stamford Bridge; Attendance: 27,621; Referee: Richard Navarra (Malta)

=== Second round ===
20 October 1971 First leg	Åtvidaberg (Sweden)	0–0	(England) Chelsea
		Report		Attendance: 10,212

3 November 1971 Second leg	Chelsea (England)	1–1	(Sweden) Åtvidaberg
		Report		Attendance: 28,071
