= Peter Feely =

English footballer

Personal information
- Full name: Peter John Feely
- Date of birth: 3 January 1950 (age 76)
- Place of birth: London, England
- Height: 6 ft 0 in (1.83 m)
- Position: Striker

Senior career*
Years	Team	Apps	(Gls)
1968–1970	Enfield		
1970–1973	Chelsea	5	(2)
1973–1974	Bournemouth	9	(2)
1974	Fulham	0	(0)
1974–1976	Gillingham	41	(22)
1976–1977	Sheffield Wednesday	19	(2)
1977	Stockport County (loan)	2	(0)
1977–1980	Slough Town	77	(26)
1980	Urban Services FC		
1980–1981	Caroline Hill		
- * Club domestic league appearances and goals

Peter John Feely (born 3 January 1950 in London) is an English former footballer who scored 28 goals from 76 appearances in the Football League.

A striker, Feely started out with non-league club Enfield, with whom he gained three England Amateur caps. He scored in the final as Enfield beat Dagenham to win the 1970 Amateur Cup, and three days later signed professional forms for Chelsea. He scored on his debut in a 2–1 win over Coventry City in April 1971. However, Feely was competing for a place in the starting line-up with players including Peter Osgood, Ian Hutchinson and Tommy Baldwin, and made five first team appearances in two and a half years. He was sold to Bournemouth in February 1973. He moved to Fulham in 1974, and then Gillingham, where he scored 22 goals in 41 league games. Feely later had spells with Sheffield Wednesday, Stockport County and Hong Kong First Division side, Urban Services. After injuries forced his retirement from football he became a Chartered Surveyor and built up an international real estate business in Hong Kong, before moving to Perth, Western Australia.
