= 1970 FA Cup final =

Football match in London, England

- Event: 1969–70 FA Cup
Chelsea	Leeds United
- Chelsea won after a replay

Final
Chelsea	Leeds United
2	2
- After extra time
- Date: 11 April 1970
- Venue: Wembley Stadium, London
- Referee: Eric Jennings (Stourbridge)
- Attendance: 100,000

Replay
Chelsea	Leeds United
2	1
- After extra time
- Date: 29 April 1970
- Venue: Old Trafford, Manchester
- Referee: Eric Jennings (Stourbridge)
- Attendance: 62,078

The 1970 FA Cup final was contested by Chelsea and Leeds United. The match took place on 11 April 1970 at Wembley Stadium and ended 2–2, making it the first FA Cup final to require a replay since 1912. The replay was staged at Old Trafford and played on 29 April; after four hours of fiercely contested football, Chelsea eventually won 2–1. To date, this is the last time both the final and replay were scheduled to be played in April; all subsequent FA Cup final ties have been scheduled to be played in May, with only the 2020 FA Cup final (played in August) and the 2023 FA Cup final (played in June) played later due to the COVID-19 pandemic and the 2022 FIFA World Cup respectively.

Leeds and Chelsea were two of England's top teams that season, having finished 2nd and 3rd respectively in the First Division. The match marked a clash of footballing contrasts: Chelsea were regarded as "flamboyant" southerners, whereas Leeds were seen as uncompromising northerners. Neither had won the FA Cup before, though both had recently been runners-up, Leeds in 1965 and Chelsea in 1967.

The replay was the only time between 1923 and 2000 that an FA Cup final was played at a stadium other than Wembley. The replay attracted a British television audience of more than 28 million, the second highest UK audience for a sports broadcast (behind the 1966 World Cup final), and the sixth highest audience for any UK broadcast. It has been ranked among the greatest ever FA Cup finals, and named as the "most brutal game" in the history of English football, due to the large number of fouls committed by both teams.

The match was the first FA Cup final to be reported on by a woman, as Mary Raine provided a match report for Radio 4's Six O'Clock News.

== Road to Wembley ==
Home teams listed first.

=== Chelsea ===
Round 3: Chelsea 3–0 Birmingham City

Round 4: Chelsea 2–2 Burnley

Replay: Burnley 1–3 Chelsea

Round 5: Crystal Palace 1–4 Chelsea

Round 6: Queens Park Rangers 2–4 Chelsea

Semi-final: Watford 1–5 Chelsea (at White Hart Lane, London)

=== Leeds United ===
Round 3: Leeds United 2–1 Swansea City

Round 4: Sutton United 0–6 Leeds United

Round 5: Leeds United 2–0 Mansfield Town

Round 6: Swindon Town 0–2 Leeds United

Semi-final: Manchester United 0–0 Leeds United (at Hillsborough Stadium, Sheffield)

Replay: Leeds United 0–0 Manchester United (at Villa Park, Birmingham)
Replay: Leeds United 1–0 Manchester United (at Burnden Park, Bolton)

== Match review ==
=== Before the game ===
The final at Wembley was scheduled for 11 April, around a month earlier than was typical for FA Cup finals, due to the FA's wish for the England national team, who were world champions and were defending their trophy in Mexico, to have time to acquaint themselves to the Mexican climate. The poor state of the pitch is sometimes erroneously explained by the Horse of the Year Show being held there a week before. The Horse of the Year Show was held at Wembley Arena. The International Horse Show was held at the stadium the previous July, but the pitch was relaid later in the year.

=== Wembley final ===
In a game where Leeds were generally seen to have had the best of the play – with winger Eddie Gray, named man of the match, in particular giving David Webb a torrid time – the Yorkshiremen took the lead after 20 minutes when Jack Charlton's downward header from a corner did not bounce in the muddy pitch, defending Chelsea player Eddie McCreadie mis-timed his attempted clearance and the ball rolled over the line. Towards the end of the first half, Chelsea's Peter Houseman drove a low shot from 20 yards (18 m), which rolled under goalkeeper Gary Sprake's body for the equaliser. Leeds appeared to have secured the game six minutes from full-time when an Allan Clarke header hit the post and Mick Jones reacted first to put the ball into the net, but two minutes later Ian Hutchinson headed in the equaliser from John Hollins' cross. There were no more goals scored during the 30-minute extra time and the two squads took a joint lap of honour.

The Wembley pitch, after the game, was in such appalling condition, as it was for much of the game itself, that the Football Association decided to stage the replay at Manchester's Old Trafford stadium.

=== Replay at Old Trafford ===
The replay at Old Trafford, watched by a television audience of 28 million, a record for an FA Cup final, became one of the most notorious clashes in English football for the harshness of play, which exceeded the previous game at Wembley. The referee in charge of both games, 47-year-old Eric Jennings from Stourbridge, in his last season as a Football League referee, allowed rough play by both sides throughout, playing the advantage to its full extent. He booked only one player, Ian Hutchinson of Chelsea, during the game.

Only one change was made in either line-up, with Leeds United replacing goalkeeper Gary Sprake with David Harvey.

Modern-day referee David Elleray reviewed the match in 1997, and concluded that in the modern era, the sides would have received six red cards and twenty yellow cards between them, while fellow referee Michael Oliver thought 11 reds could have been given. Tommy Baldwin and Terry Cooper, admittedly two of the quieter men in the two sides, were kicking lumps out of one another, as the battle began. Not long into the game, Chelsea's Ron "Chopper" Harris caught winger Eddie Gray with a kick to the back of the knee, an action which neutralised the Scottish winger for the rest of the game. Norman Hunter and Ian Hutchinson traded punches while Eddie McCreadie, in his own penalty area, made a flying kick to Billy Bremner's head and Johnny Giles also lunged at a Chelsea opponent. Charlton kneed and headbutted Peter Osgood while Chelsea's goalkeeper Peter Bonetti was injured after being bundled into the net by Leeds' Jones, who, minutes later, shot past the limping Bonetti for the opening goal.

Chelsea equalised twelve minutes before the end, after a flowing move, from which Osgood scored with a diving header from a Charlie Cooke cross. Jackie Charlton should have been marking Osgood but had 'lost' him while chasing Hutchinson to exact retribution for a deadleg administered in the Chelsea penalty area a minute or so earlier. In scoring, Osgood became the last player to date to have scored in every round of the FA Cup. With the game ending 1–1, the final once again went into extra time. One minute before the first period of extra time was to end, Chelsea's Hutchinson sent in a long throw-in that missed almost every player in the penalty area but came off Charlton's head towards the far post, before being put into the unguarded net by Webb to give Chelsea the lead for the first time in the two games. They kept the lead until the end, securing their first FA Cup win.

== Beyond the final ==
The two teams, at the time, were praised for their determination and for providing fans and audiences with two "splendid games", but there was also criticism among football professionals and media for the very physical play. In the modern era, however, the two games are often denoted as "epic" and "iconic".

The following season, neither 1970 finalist reach the last eight of the FA Cup. Chelsea were eliminated in the 4th round, losing 0–3 to Manchester City at home, while in the 5th round, Leeds were upset in a 2–3 away defeat by Fourth Division outsiders Colchester United. On the other hand, each team won a first European trophy. Chelsea's was the Cup Winners' Cup, with a 2–1 win in the final over Real Madrid of Spain, again after a replay, the first game having ended 1–1. Leeds beat Juventus of Italy on away goals in the two-legged final of the Fairs Cup, drawing 2–2 in Turin and then 1–1 at home.

On 28 February 2024 the two sides played each other in the 5th Round of the FA Cup at Stamford Bridge, with Chelsea winning 3-2 due to a late Connor Gallagher winner. On 26 April 2026 the two teams would face each other yet again in the FA Cup Semi-finals. Chelsea won 1-0 courtesy of an Enzo Fernández header. Ex-Chelsea midfielder Ethan Ampadu started both games for Leeds, wearing the captain's armband in the 2026 Semi-final.

== Match details ==
=== Wembley ===
11 April 1970
15:00 BST

Chelsea	2–2 (a.e.t.)	Leeds United
Houseman 41'; Hutchinson 86'	(Report)	Charlton 20'; Jones 84'

Wembley, London
Attendance: 100,000
Referee: Eric Jennings

Chelsea	Leeds United

GK	1	(England) Peter Bonetti
RB	2	(England) David Webb
LB	3	(Scotland) Eddie McCreadie
CM	4	(England) John Hollins
CB	5	(Republic of Ireland) John Dempsey
CB	6	(England) Ron Harris (c)	(substituted off) 90'
RM	7	(England) Tommy Baldwin
CM	8	(England) Peter Houseman
CF	9	(England) Peter Osgood
CF	10	(England) Ian Hutchinson
LM	11	(Scotland) Charlie Cooke
Substitutes:
DF	12	(England) Marvin Hinton	(substituted on) 90'
Manager:
(England) Dave Sexton

GK	1	(Wales) Gary Sprake
RB	2	(England) Paul Madeley
LB	3	(England) Terry Cooper
CM	4	(Scotland) Billy Bremner (c)
CB	5	(England) Jack Charlton
CB	6	(England) Norman Hunter
RM	7	(Scotland) Peter Lorimer
CF	8	(England) Allan Clarke
CF	9	(England) Mick Jones
CM	10	(Republic of Ireland) Johnny Giles
LM	11	(Scotland) Eddie Gray
Substitutes:
MF	12	(England) Mick Bates
Manager:
(England) Don Revie

Match rules
- 90 minutes.
- 30 minutes of extra-time if necessary.
- Replay if scores still level.
- One named substitute

=== Old Trafford ===
29 April 1970

Chelsea	2–1 (a.e.t.)	Leeds United
Osgood 78'; Webb 104'	(Report)	Jones 35'

Old Trafford, Manchester
Attendance: 62,078
Referee: Eric Jennings

Chelsea	Leeds United

GK	1	(England) Peter Bonetti
RB	2	(England) Ron Harris (c)
LB	3	(Scotland) Eddie McCreadie
CM	4	(England) John Hollins
CB	5	(Republic of Ireland) John Dempsey
CB	6	(England) David Webb
RM	7	(England) Tommy Baldwin
CM	8	(Scotland) Charlie Cooke
CF	9	(England) Peter Osgood	(substituted off) 112'
CF	10	(England) Ian Hutchinson
LM	11	(England) Peter Houseman
Substitutes:
DF	12	(England) Marvin Hinton	(substituted on) 112'
Manager:
(England) Dave Sexton

GK	1	(Scotland) David Harvey
RB	2	(England) Paul Madeley
LB	3	(England) Terry Cooper
CM	4	(Scotland) Billy Bremner (c)
CB	5	(England) Jack Charlton
CB	6	(England) Norman Hunter
RM	7	(Scotland) Peter Lorimer
CF	8	(England) Allan Clarke
CF	9	(England) Mick Jones
CM	10	(Republic of Ireland) Johnny Giles
LM	11	(Scotland) Eddie Gray
Substitutes:
MF	12	(England) Mick Bates
Manager:
(England) Don Revie

Match rules
- 90 minutes.
- 30 minutes of extra-time if necessary.
- Replay if scores still level.
- One named substitute
