= John Dempsey (footballer, born 1946) =

Irish footballer and manager (1946–2024)

Personal information
- Date of birth: 15 March 1946
- Place of birth: Hampstead, England
- Date of death: 5 November 2024 (aged 78)
- Position: Centre back

Senior career*
Years	Team	Apps	(Gls)
1964–1969	Fulham	149	(4)
1969–1978	Chelsea	166	(4)
1976	→ Serbian White Eagles		
1978–1980	Philadelphia Fury	81	(2)
1983–1984	Dundalk	10	(0)
Total		404	(10)

International career
1966–1972	Republic of Ireland	19	(1)

Managerial career
- 1976: Serbian White Eagles
- –1982: Maidenhead United
- 1983–1984: Dundalk
- Egham Town
- * Club domestic league appearances and goals

John Dempsey (15 March 1946 – 6 November 2024) was a professional footballer who played as a centre back. He played for Fulham and Chelsea in the 1960s and 1970s before moving to the United States to join Philadelphia Fury. He ended his career after a stint in Ireland with Dundalk. Born in England, he represented the Republic of Ireland national team at international level.

== Club career ==
Starting his career with Fulham, making his debut in 1963 and 149 appearances over six years, Dempsey was signed for West London rivals Chelsea by Dave Sexton in January 1969 for £70,000. He made his Chelsea debut against Southampton in February that year and established himself in the side for the remainder of the 1968–69 season.

Dempsey featured in the successful Chelsea side of the early 1970s, winning the FA Cup with the club in 1970, playing in both fiercely contested final matches against Leeds United as his side eventually ran out 2–1 winners. A year later, the Cup Winners' Cup was added with a win against Real Madrid in another replay in Athens, in which Dempsey scored the opening goal with a powerful volley following a corner (one of only five goals he scored for the club) as Chelsea won 2–1.

He had no further success with the club, but remained during the turbulent later 1970s, and eventually left in March 1978 with the club by then in Division Two, and moved to the Philadelphia Fury of the NASL, playing alongside fellow ex-Chelsea star Peter Osgood. In 1979, he was voted the NASL's defender of the year, beating out Franz Beckenbauer who finished second. In the summer of 1976 he played in the National Soccer League with the Serbian White Eagles where he served as a player-coach. His stint with the White Eagles was cut short after a dispute in pay and housing accommodations.

He was appointed player-manager of Dundalk in August 1983 making his League of Ireland debut on 9 October at Sligo Rovers but departed by mutual consent in March after a series of confrontations with referees.

He also had spells managing Maidenhead and Egham Town before retiring from the game in 1984.

== International career ==
Dempsey won a number of international caps for the Republic of Ireland (he qualified to play for Ireland through his parents). He was the first Irish international player ever to be sent off in a 1970 FIFA World Cup qualification game, being that against Hungary in the Népstadion.

== Later life and death ==
Dempsey was involved in local charity work and attended the tributes to Peter Osgood at Stamford Bridge following the latter's death.

He also worked with adults with autism and learning difficulties in a daycentre in Barnet.

John Dempsey suddenly died on 5 November 2024, at the age of 78.

== Honours ==
Chelsea

- FA Cup: 1969–70
- European Cup Winners' Cup: 1970–71
- Football League Cup runner-up: 1971–72

== See also ==
- List of Republic of Ireland international footballers born outside the Republic of Ireland
