= Geoffrey Green =

British football writer

Geoffrey Green OBE (12 May 1911 – 9 May 1990) was an English football writer. Green was educated at Shrewsbury School, where he played football. He started writing about football for The Times in the 1930s. He is considered to be the godfather of football reporting, although he remained anonymous in the paper until 23 January 1967. He also broadcast on football for BBC Radio.

Green was appointed Member of the Order of the British Empire (MBE) in the 1946 Birthday Honours, and promoted to Officer (OBE) in the 1976 New Year Honours.

== Match of the Century ==
Most noteworthy of his work was covering the "Match of the Century" on 25 November 1953, wherein Hungary defeated England by the 6–3 scoreline under the heading "A New Conception of Football". It was England's first defeat at Wembley, and the inventors of football were described by him as "strangers in a strange world."

The best goal of the game was scored by Ferenc Puskas; having received the ball from Czibor on the right near the six-yard box when the England captain Billy Wright went towards him for the tackle, Puskas drew the ball back as Wright charged past "like a fire engine going to the wrong fire" leaving the Hungarian captain free to score from his powerful left-foot.

Green retired from The Times in 1976 after nearly 40 years of distinguished service.

== Manchester United ==
Newspapers continued to be printed in Manchester until the late 1960s. During this period, the youth-focused approach introduced by Matt Busby at Manchester United attracted considerable public attention, particularly through the emergence of players such as Duncan Edwards, Bobby Charlton and George Best from the club's youth system. Sports journalist Geoffrey Green covered Manchester United extensively during this era and witnessed the careers of these players during their peak years.

Green reported on perhaps one of the greatest games ever played in the FA Cup where Manchester United beat Aston Villa 6–4 in a 3rd round match "They thought as one man and moved as one at top speed. Here was the sort of football one dreams about...."

Green devoted an entire chapter to Duncan Edwards in his book Soccer in The Fifties. Green wrote: "His talent, his energy, his unselfconscious fun and enjoyment of the chase, his ability to make everything seem possible, all this added up to a volcano of excitement that gripped the crowds and the game wherever he played."

== Books ==
1. The Official History of the FA Cup (1949)
2. History of The Football Association (1953)
3. Soccer in The Fifties
4. There's Only One United (1978)
5. Pardon me for living (autobiography)
