= John Hollins =

English footballer (1946–2023)

John Hollins MBE
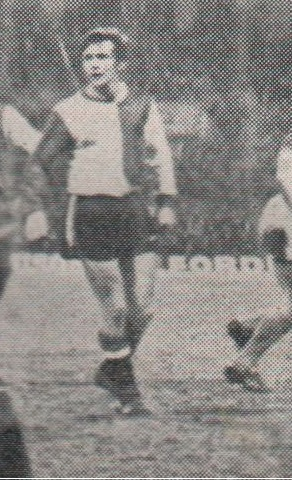
- Hollins playing for Queens Park Rangers in 1975

Personal information
- Full name: John William Hollins
- Date of birth: 16 July 1946
- Place of birth: Guildford, Surrey, England
- Date of death: 14 June 2023 (aged 76)
- Positions: Full-back; midfielder

Youth career
- 1961–1963: Chelsea

Senior career*
| Years | Team | Apps | (Gls) |
| 1963–1975 | Chelsea | 436 | (47) |
| 1975–1979 | Queens Park Rangers | 151 | (6) |
| 1979–1983 | Arsenal | 127 | (9) |
| 1983–1984 | Chelsea | 29 | (1) |
| 1989 | Cobh Ramblers | 1 | (0) |
| Total | | 744 | (63) |

International career
| 1978 | England B | 5 | (1) |
| 1967 | England | 1 | (0) |

Managerial career
- 1985–1988: Chelsea
- 1997: Queens Park Rangers (caretaker)
- 1998–2001: Swansea City
- 2001–2002: Rochdale
- 2003: Stockport County (caretaker)
- 2004: Stockport Tiger Star
- 2005–2006: Crawley Town
- 2008: Weymouth
- * Club domestic league appearances and goals

John William Hollins (16 July 1946 – 14 June 2023) was an English football player and manager. He initially played as a midfielder, before becoming an effective full-back later in his career. Hollins played in the Football League, predominantly for Chelsea, with whom he won the FA Cup, Football League Cup and UEFA Cup Winners' Cup. He made 592 appearances for Chelsea over two spells from 1963 to 1975 and from 1983 to 1984, making him one of six players to have made over 500 appearances for the club.

He subsequently played for Queens Park Rangers (1975–1979) and Arsenal (1979–1983). and made a total of 714 First Division appearances, an English top division record for an outfield player and second only to goalkeeper Peter Shilton. He moved into football management and took charge of Chelsea in 1985, winning the inaugural Full Members Cup in 1986, but was sacked in 1988. He later managed Swansea City, Rochdale and Crawley Town.

Overall, he made over 1,000 appearances in his career.

== Playing career ==
Born in Guildford, Surrey, Hollins was born into a footballing family – his father, grandfather and three brothers were all professional footballers as well. One of those siblings, Dave, played international football for Wales.

=== Chelsea ===
Hollins joined Chelsea as a youth player and made his debut for the Blues against Swindon Town in September 1963 aged only 17. A talented and hard-running midfielder, usually wearing the number 4 shirt, he was known for his dedicated attitude to the game and went on to become a regular and eventually club captain. Hollins played 592 games and scored 69 goals in his first spell at Chelsea, and was part of the successful Chelsea sides of the mid-1960s and early 1970s. After establishing himself in the Chelsea side in 1964, he rarely missed a game over the next decade, appearing in 400 out of a possible 420 league games, at one point making 167 consecutive appearances, a club record.

Hollins played in the first leg of the 3–2 aggregate victory over Leicester City in League Cup final in 1965 and the loss to Tottenham in the FA Cup final two years later. In 1970, he played a significant part in Chelsea's hard-fought FA Cup final win over Leeds United, supplying the cross for Ian Hutchinson's late headed equaliser at Wembley. Chelsea eventually won 2–1 in the replay at Old Trafford. They won the Cup Winners' Cup in Athens against Real Madrid a year later, again after a replay, but Hollins missed the second match due to an injury. He was Chelsea's player of the year two years running. While at Chelsea, he also won a solitary England cap, against Spain, on 24 May 1967.

Hollins had his most prolific goalscoring season for Chelsea in the 1971–72 season, finding the net 17 times. Chelsea also reached another League Cup final in 1972, losing to Stoke City, but declined thereafter, though Hollins remained until the side's relegation to the Second Division at the end of the 1974–75 season, when he was sold to nearby Queens Park Rangers.

=== Queens Park Rangers ===
In June 1975, Hollins signed for Queens Park Rangers for £80,000, reuniting with his former Chelsea manager Dave Sexton. He was with QPR for four seasons, playing 183 matches in total, In his first season with the club, QPR notably finished behind Liverpool by just a single point. Hollins, along with ex-Chelsea veteran David Webb and ex-Arsenal veteran Frank McLintock (captain of the Arsenal double winning team) had combined to so very nearly be First Division champions.

=== Arsenal ===
In the summer of 1979, the 33-year-old Hollins made a surprising move to Arsenal, initially as a cover player, but he ended up becoming a regular in the Arsenal side, although by now he played more often as a defender than in midfield. Hollins made his Arsenal debut versus Liverpool at the 1979 FA Charity Shield. He played 172 matches and scored 13 goals, and was part of the Arsenal side that lost the Cup Winners' Cup final in 1980, coming on as a substitute and then scoring in the penalty shoot-out. He did, however, miss out on a place in the squad for the same season's FA Cup final, which Arsenal also lost. In the second half of the 1981-82 campaign, Hollins began to fill in at right back after John Devine fell out of favour, and became a firm favourite with the crowd. At 36, he won the Arsenal Supporters Club player of the season award in 1982.

=== Return to Chelsea ===
Hollins returned to Chelsea on a free transfer in 1983, and helped the club gain promotion back to the First Division in 1983–84, playing a further 30 times. He retired at the end of that season, having played 939 first-class matches in total.

== Managerial career ==
=== Chelsea ===
Hollins was immediately appointed coach at Chelsea; a year later he became first-team manager following John Neal's retirement. Chelsea built up a strong title challenge in 1985–86 and went top in February, but they finished sixth after collecting a mere nine points from a possible 33 during their final 11 games.

Chelsea won the Full Members Cup in the same season, though, hanging on for a 5–4 win over Manchester City at Wembley Stadium, having almost let slip a 5–1 lead.

Hollins was sacked in March 1988 with the club in the midst of a four-month run without a league win which would see the season end in Chelsea being relegated in the first ever two-leg relegation/promotion play-offs against Middlesbrough.

=== Post-Chelsea ===
After leaving Chelsea in February 1989 he came out of retirement to sign for Irish club Cobh Ramblers. However, he only played one league game before returning to England.

Hollins then set up his own sports promotion and agency company, before being tempted back to join the coaching staff of his old club QPR in 1993, and stepped in as caretaker manager between Stewart Houston's dismissal and Ray Harford's appointment during the 1997–98 season. He later had spells as manager of Swansea City, Rochdale and as caretaker-manager of Stockport County. After which he managed Stockport County's Chinese affiliate club Stockport Tiger Star, before becoming a pundit for BBC Radio 5 Live.

Hollins was most successful in his managerial reign with Swansea City where he quickly established himself as a fan favourite and guided Swansea to the Division Three title in 1999–2000, but was sacked after they failed to sustain themselves back in Division Two. He steered Rochdale into the play-offs in 2001–02 but was notoriously sacked by fax that summer after prevaricating over a new contract.

Hollins spent a short time as the assistant manager at Raith Rovers in 2004, under Claude Anelka—the brother of Chelsea striker Nicolas Anelka. He resigned following disagreements over tactics and team selection with Anelka.

On 23 November 2005, Hollins was announced as manager of Conference National side Crawley Town after the departure of Francis Vines. He remained with the club during the financial crisis that saw them docked ten points for going into administration, but left the club on 30 October 2006 after Crawley had been beaten by Lewes in the final qualifying round for the FA Cup.

In 2007 when Kenny Jackett left Swansea City, Hollins re-applied to become the manager of Swansea City for the second time. He did not get the job as it went to Spaniard, Roberto Martínez.

In January 2008, Hollins took over as manager of Conference National side Weymouth. He was joined just days later by Alan Lewer who filled the role of Hollins' assistant for the second time as they were together at Crawley Town.

On 13 November 2008, Hollins was suspended from his duties by Weymouth, while the Football Conference launched an investigation into whether there had been a breach of contract. On 3 December 2008, Weymouth announced that Hollins had been sacked.

== Personal life and death ==
Hollins was appointed a Member of the Order of the British Empire (MBE) for services to football in the 1982 Birthday Honours. He also made an anti-smoking commercial for television in the same year as part of a Government campaign entitled Look After Yourself.

Hollins's son, Chris, was the main sports presenter on BBC Breakfast between 2005 and 2012 and he also has a daughter Elizabeth.

Hollins died from a heart condition on 14 June 2023, at the age of 76.

== Honours ==
=== Player ===
Chelsea

- Football League Second Division: 1983–84
- FA Cup: 1969–70; runner-up: 1966–67
- Football League Cup: 1964–65; runner-up: 1971–72
- European Cup Winners' Cup: 1970–71

Arsenal

- European Cup Winners' Cup runner-up: 1979–80

Individual

- Chelsea Player of the Year: 1969–70, 1970–71
- Arsenal Player of the Season: 1981−82

=== Managerial ===
Chelsea

- Full Members' Cup: 1985–86

Swansea City

- Football League Third Division: 1999–2000
