= Peter Houseman =

English footballer

Personal information
- Date of birth: 24 December 1945
- Place of birth: Battersea, London, England
- Date of death: 20 March 1977 (aged 31)
- Place of death: Oxford, England
- Height: 5 ft 8 in (1.73 m)
- Position: Winger

Youth career
- Chelsea

Senior career*
Years	Team	Apps	(Gls)
1963–1975	Chelsea	269	(20)
1975–1977	Oxford United	65	(2)
Total		334	(22)
- * Club domestic league appearances and goals

Peter Houseman (24 December 1945 – 20 March 1977) was an English footballer who played as a winger. He was best known for his part in Chelsea's FA Cup-winning side of 1970. He later signed for Oxford United. He was killed along with his wife and two friends in a car crash in 1977.

== Club career ==
=== Chelsea ===
Born in Battersea, Houseman signed professional terms with Chelsea in 1963, having played for the Chelsea Juniors. He made his debut for the club in the 1963–64 season in a 3–2 win over Sheffield United but made only sporadic appearances in his early years at Chelsea, with manager Tommy Docherty unconvinced by him. A section of the Chelsea crowd were also unconvinced by Houseman's performances, and sometimes singled him out for abuse. He featured in no more than twelve games per season in his first three years with Chelsea and missed out on the club's FA Cup final loss to Tottenham Hotspur in 1967.

However, an injury to John Boyle helped Houseman gradually establish himself as a regular in the side on the left wing. He was a skilful dribbler and renowned crosser of a ball, often acting as the team's "water-carrier" and providing service for the likes of Ian Hutchinson and Peter Osgood. He did not miss a match during the 1969–70 season. His most significant contribution to Chelsea came in their first ever FA Cup success in 1970, with Houseman scoring a total of 6 goals in that season's competition. His first 2 goals came when Chelsea faced Burnley in the fourth round; after a draw at Stamford Bridge, the side travelled to Burnley's home ground, Turf Moor, for the replay and, with eighteen minutes left, were trailing 1–0. Houseman picked up the ball in his own half and dribbled through the Burnley midfield, riding several challenges. He reached the opposition penalty area and smashed a shot into the top corner to equalise. In extra time, Houseman provided the cross for Tommy Baldwin to put Chelsea ahead, and then completed the comeback by scoring the third.

He scored again in the 4–1 away win at Crystal Palace in the fifth round, and then in the semi-final against Watford, with the Second Division side holding Chelsea at 1–1, Houseman again played a key part, crossing for Osgood to give Chelsea a 2–1 lead and then adding two more himself in an eventual 5–1 win, first rifling a low shot after dribbling past four Watford players, then side-footing the ball home after a neat one-two with Ian Hutchinson. Chelsea faced Leeds United in the final, and it was Houseman who scored Chelsea's first equaliser just before half time, his low shot from 25 yards benefiting from the poor pitch to elude Leeds goalkeeper Gary Sprake, though he spent much of the game trying to cover the team's over-stretched defence. The match ended 2–2 and Chelsea won the replay 2–1 at Old Trafford to take the cup for the first time in the club's history.

Chelsea won the Cup Winners' Cup a year later, with Houseman an ever-present, helping the side overturn a 0–2 quarter-final deficit to beat Bruges 4–2 on aggregate with the first goal and then playing in both finals against Real Madrid in Athens, with Chelsea winning 2–1 in the replay. Chelsea reached the League Cup final in 1972, though Houseman was denied a hat-trick of cup-winners medals as they unexpectedly lost to Stoke City at Wembley. The club declined as a force thereafter, but having won over the critics to become a key member of one of Chelsea's most glamorous and successful sides, he remained with the Blues until their relegation in 1975. Teammate John Hollins said of him, "Anybody you asked in that team who they wanted as a team-mate, it would be Peter Houseman without a shadow of a doubt".

=== Oxford United ===
He left the club in May 1975, to join Oxford United after playing almost 350 games for the Londoners, and scoring 39 goals. His time with Oxford was less successful, with the club being relegated from the Second Division in 1975–76. He made 72 appearances for the club and scored twice.

== Death ==
Houseman was killed along with his wife and two friends in a car crash on the A40 near Oxford in March 1977 whilst driving home from a fund-raising charity event. The accident occurred when a speeding driver, 22-year-old Bartholomew Smith, the son of Tory MP John Smith, veered into Houseman's vehicle, travelling in the opposite direction. Smith was subsequently tried and sentenced to a £4,000 fine plus having his driving licence revoked for ten years. An expert witness at the trial claimed that Smith had been driving at "maniacal" speed and was "considerably intoxicated", allegedly after a Bullingdon Club dinner. A testimonial match between the 1970 and 1977 Chelsea teams was arranged to raise money for the Housemans' orphaned children, with a crowd of almost 17,000 in attendance. The footballer was a hero in the village of Oakley in Hampshire, where he had set up and coached a youth football team. There is now a youth league named after him in the area. In 2018 Bartholomew Smith was awarded an OBE for services to charity.

The National Archives has a catalogue record: Bartholomew Evan Eric Smith: charged with death by dangerous driving. With photographs... The record was closed from general public view for 99 years.

Season	Club	Division	League		FA Cup		League Cup		Europe		Total	
Season	Club	Division	Apps	Goals	Apps	Goals	Apps	Goals	Apps	Goals	Apps	Goals
1963–64	Chelsea	First Division	4	1	0	0	0	0	0	0	4	1
1964–65	Chelsea	First Division	9	1	0	0	3	0	0	0	12	1
1965–66	Chelsea	First Division	10	0	0	0	0	0	2	0	12	0
1966–67	Chelsea	First Division	18	1	1	1	3	3	0	0	22	5
1967–68	Chelsea	First Division	20	3	2	0	1	0	0	0	23	3
1968–69	Chelsea	First Division	32	3	2	0	1	0	2	1	37	4
1969–70	Chelsea	First Division	42	3	8	6	4	0	0	0	54	9
1970–71	Chelsea	First Division	37	2	3	1	4	0	8	1	53	4
1971–72	Chelsea	First Division	27	2	3	1	7	1	3	3	40	7
1972–73	Chelsea	First Division	21	2	4	1	6	0	0	0	31	3
1973–74	Chelsea	First Division	25	2	1	0	0	0	0	0	26	2
1974–75	Chelsea	First Division	24	1	1	0	4	0	0	0	29	1
Chelsea total			269	20	25	10	33	4	15	5	343	39

Totals include 1 Charity Shield appearance in 1970–71.

== Honours ==
Chelsea

- FA Cup: 1969–70
- European Cup Winners' Cup: 1970–71
- Football League Cup runner-up: 1971–72
