= Ian Hutchinson (footballer, born 1948) =

English footballer

Personal information
- Date of birth: 4 August 1948
- Place of birth: Derby, England
- Date of death: 19 September 2002 (aged 54)
- Position: Striker

Youth career
- Burton Albion

Senior career*
Years	Team	Apps	(Gls)
1966–1968	Burton Albion	49	(19)
1968	Cambridge United		
1968–1976	Chelsea	119	(44)
- Cork United
1976-1979	Slinfold	45	(25)

International career
1970–1971	England U23	2	(0)
- * Club domestic league appearances and goals

Ian Hutchinson (4 August 1948 – 19 September 2002) was an English footballer who spent most of his career with Chelsea.

Hutchinson was born in Derby and started his career with non-league Burton Albion before signing for Cambridge United in February 1968. In July 1968 he joined Chelsea for £5000. Chelsea coach Ron Suart had journeyed to Cambridge to watch a goalkeeper, but instead recommended Hutchinson to manager Dave Sexton.

Hutchinson was a striker noted for his impressive heading ability and for taking long throw-ins. On his debut against Ipswich Town, he sent in a series of long throws which reached the opposite side of the penalty area, confusing both the opposing defenders and the crowd and one of which an Ipswich defender inadvertently put into his own net. At Chelsea he proved to be the perfect foil for the more technically gifted Peter Osgood after a sparkling debut partnership in which both players scored in a 3–1 win against Sheffield Wednesday. During the 1969-70 season they scored 53 goals between them. That season turned out to be Hutchinson's most successful, as he scored an impressive 16 goals in 26 league appearances.

Hutchinson is most notable for his part in Chelsea winning the FA Cup that same season. In the final against Leeds United, he was often in the thick of the action. In the first match at Wembley his headed flick-on teed up Peter Houseman for Chelsea's first equaliser and he was later floored by a challenge from Leeds' Norman Hunter. Leeds took the lead with six minutes to go, but two minutes later Hutchinson, still limping from Hunter's challenge, headed in John Hollins' cross to take the game to a replay. Two weeks later at Old Trafford, with the game tied at 1–1 going into extra time, Hutchinson launched one of his trademark long throw-ins into the Leeds penalty area and it was headed in by David Webb to win the cup for Chelsea.

Despite more impressive performances in the following years at Chelsea, the remainder of his career was blighted by injuries, including two broken legs, a broken arm, a broken toe and persistent knee trouble, which kept him out of the side's successful Cup Winners' Cup run the following year and limited him to just 4 appearances in the 1972-73 season. He retired in July 1976 aged 27, having been unable to conquer his injury woes. He made 144 appearances for Chelsea and scored 58 goals.

All that remained of his playing days was a brief stint with non-League Dartford FC, during which he often took to the field in immense pain. There followed a spell as Chelsea's commercial manager in the late 1970s and in more recent years Hutchinson worked in corporate hospitality for several clubs.

Following his professional retirement, Hutchinson joined Slinfold FC where he played under the village hero Ian Haines. Unfortunately, his injuries remained an issue and he changed position to centre back where he still managed to score 25 goals in 45 games.

He died in September 2002 after a long illness.

== Honours ==
Chelsea

- FA Cup: 1969–70
