= David Webb (footballer) =

English footballer and manager (born 1946)

Personal information
- Full name: David James Webb
- Date of birth: 9 April 1946 (age 80)
- Place of birth: Stratford, Essex, England
- Height: 5 ft 11 in (1.80 m)
- Position: Defender

Senior career*
Years	Team	Apps	(Gls)
1963–1966	Leyton Orient	62	(3)
1966–1968	Southampton	75	(2)
1968–1974	Chelsea	230	(21)
1974–1977	Queens Park Rangers	116	(7)
1977–1978	Leicester City	33	(0)
1978–1980	Derby County	26	(1)
1980–1984	AFC Bournemouth	11	(0)
1984	Torquay United	2	(1)
Total		555	(35)

Managerial career
- 1980–1982: AFC Bournemouth (player-manager)
- 1984–1985: Torquay United (player-manager)
- 1986–1987: Southend United
- 1988–1992: Southend United
- 1993: Chelsea
- 1993–1997: Brentford
- 2000: Yeovil Town
- 2000–2001: Southend United
- 2010: Southend United (assistant manager)
- * Club domestic league appearances and goals

David James Webb (born 9 April 1946) is an English former professional footballer who made 555 appearances in the Football League playing for Leyton Orient, Southampton, Chelsea, Queens Park Rangers, Leicester City, Derby County, AFC Bournemouth and Torquay United. He became a manager, taking charge of Bournemouth, Torquay United, Southend United, Chelsea, Brentford and Yeovil Town.

== Playing career ==
=== Leyton Orient and Southampton ===
David Webb was born in Stratford (then in Essex) and began his career as an amateur with West Ham United, but on failing to make the grade joined Leyton Orient in May 1963. His league debut came in the 1964–65 season, launching what would be a long career in league football. In March 1966, after 62 games (3 goals) for Orient, he moved to Southampton, with George O'Brien going in the opposite direction. He scored twice in 75 games for the Saints, including a goal on his debut to equalise in a vital 1–1 draw at promotion rivals Wolverhampton Wanderers, before joining Chelsea in February 1968.

=== Chelsea ===
It was with Chelsea that Webb really made his name in football, in particular for his role in Chelsea's win in the 1970 FA Cup final against Leeds United at Old Trafford. During the first game at Wembley, Webb, playing at right-back, had a nightmare and was tormented throughout the match by the nimble and tricky Leeds winger Eddie Gray as Chelsea were somewhat fortunate to emerge with a 2–2 draw. Manager Dave Sexton made a tactical switch for the replay, moving Webb to the centre to partner John Dempsey while the more uncompromising Ron Harris was detailed to mark Gray. Webb – and Chelsea overall – performed markedly better in the replay and it was he who proved the unlikely hero, heading in the winner from an Ian Hutchinson throw-in in extra time.

The following year Chelsea beat Real Madrid in another replay to win the European Cup Winners Cup. Although he spent much of his Chelsea career as a right back, he also played in central defence (his original position) and occasionally as a centre forward, once hitting a hat-trick against Ipswich Town in December 1968. He wore every shirt from 1 to 12 at Chelsea, except number 11. Ipswich were once again witness to his versatility when he played as a goalkeeper for an entire match, on 27 December 1971, keeping a clean sheet in the process, and then scored two goals in the return fixture as a centre forward in March 1972.

=== Queens Park Rangers ===
He finally left Chelsea in July 1974, having scored 21 times in 230 games, joining Queens Park Rangers for £120,000. In February 1975, Webb sensationally announced his retirement from the game after just a few months with his new club. However, just a week later, he asked to return to the club, having resolved a number of personal business issues, with assistance from close friend Terry Venables. Webb then concentrated on football, helping Rangers to the runners-up spot in the Football League in the 1975–76 season, their best ever league position. Seven goals in 116 games for Rangers were followed by a £50,000 move to Leicester City in September 1977.

=== Later career ===
He stayed just over a year at Filbert Street, playing 33 games for Leicester City before joining Derby County in December 1978. His Derby debut came on 23 December in a goalless draw at home to Aston Villa. He left the Baseball Ground in May 1980, after 26 games for the Rams (1 goal), joining AFC Bournemouth.

== Managerial career ==
=== AFC Bournemouth ===
He played only 11 times for Bournemouth, but in December 1980 was appointed manager, guiding them to promotion to the third division in 1982. He held the position until 10 February 1982, when he was sacked after a dispute with the chairman over new ownership of the club. His successor was Don Megson.

=== Torquay United ===
In February 1984, after a spell out of the game working as a self-employed salesman, he was appointed manager of Torquay United in succession to Bruce Rioch. At the end of the 1983–84 season, Torquay finished ninth in the Fourth Division and were looking to progress. The following season they finished bottom and Webb himself was forced out of retirement, scoring once in his two league appearances that season. On 21 August 1985, Webb became managing director at Torquay, appointing first John Sims and then Stuart Morgan to manage the team. Torquay finished bottom again the following season, but were re-elected to the Football League in the season before automatic relegation was introduced.

=== Southend United ===
Webb left Torquay to manage Southend United, another Fourth Division side, on 17 June 1986. He left in March 1987, just weeks before they won promotion to the Third Division. He was re-appointed in November 1988 but couldn't save the club from relegation back to the Fourth Division. He guided Southend to promotion from the old Fourth Division in 1990 and from the Third Division a year later, taking them into the Second Division for the first time in their history. They briefly topped the Second Division halfway through the season, emerging as surprise contenders for a unique third successive promotion and place in the new FA Premier League, but fell away to mid-table during the final stages of the season, with Webb then resigning as manager.

=== Chelsea ===
Webb returned to Chelsea as interim manager in February 1993 on a short-term contract to replace Ian Porterfield. The club was in freefall, without a league win in over two months, 12th in the Premier League after being in the top five earlier in the season. Under Webb, performances and results gradually improved and the team eventually finished a comfortable 11th in the Premiership. But the club's board did not offer him a permanent contract and appointed Glenn Hoddle instead.

=== Brentford ===
Webb returned to the game within days, taking the manager's job at Brentford, who had just been relegated to Division Two, in May 1993. After two play-off appearances had failed to get them back into Division One, Webb acquired an ownership stake in the club and resigned as manager in 1997. Webb sold the club to Ron Noades in June 1998, following protests from supporters about his running of the club, and their relegation to Division Three

=== Yeovil Town and back to Southend United ===
In March 2000 he took over as manager of Yeovil Town in the Conference, but resigned in September 2000 to take over at Southend United for the third time. He left Southend in October 2001, but returned again, as caretaker manager, in November 2003, in between Steve Wignall leaving and Steve Tilson taking over.

Webb bought Yeovil Town from Jon Goddard-Watts in December 2005, taking over the role of Chief Executive. He resigned from this position in February 2006 and has since sold his shares to chairman John Fry.

He was appointed assistant manager at Southend in March 2010 until the end of the 2009–10 season after taking over from Paul Brush.

== Personal life ==
Webb's son Daniel also became a professional footballer. He also has two adopted children.

== Honours ==
Chelsea

- FA Cup: 1969–70
- European Cup Winners' Cup: 1970–71
- Football League Cup runner-up: 1971–72
