= 1969–70 FA Cup =

Tournament details
- Country: England; Wales

Final positions
- Champions: Chelsea (1st title)
- Runners-up: Leeds United

Tournament statistics
- Top goal scorer: Peter Osgood (8)

The 1969–70 FA Cup was the 89th season of the world's oldest football cup competition, the Football Association Challenge Cup, commonly known as the FA Cup. First Division side Chelsea won the competition for the first time, first drawing with Leeds United 2–2 in the final at Wembley, before winning 2–1 in the replay at Old Trafford.

Matches were scheduled to be played at the stadium of the team named first on the date specified for each round, which was always a Saturday. Some matches, however, might be rescheduled for other days if there were clashes with games for other competitions or the weather was inclement. If scores were level after 90 minutes had been played, a replay would take place at the stadium of the second-named team later the same week. If the replayed match was drawn further replays would be held until a winner was determined. If scores were level after 90 minutes had been played in a replay, a 30-minute period of extra time would be played.

== Calendar ==
Round	Date
Preliminary round	Saturday 6 September 1969
First round qualifying	Saturday 20 September 1969
Second round qualifying	Saturday 4 October 1969
Third round qualifying	Saturday 18 October 1969
Fourth round qualifying	Saturday 1 November 1969
First round proper	Saturday 15 November 1969
Second round proper	Saturday 6 December 1969
Third round proper	Saturday 3 January 1970
Fourth round proper	Saturday 24 January 1970
Fifth round proper	Saturday 7 February 1970
Sixth round proper	Saturday 21 February 1970
Semi-finals	Saturday 14 March 1970
Final	Saturday 11 April 1970

== Qualifying rounds ==
Most participating clubs that were not members of the Football League competed in the qualifying rounds to secure one of 30 places available in the first round.

The winners from the fourth qualifying round were South Shields, Whitby Town, Spennymoor United, Mossley, Bangor City, Wigan Athletic, Macclesfield Town, Kirkby Town, Grantham, Telford United, Hereford United, Tamworth, Alfreton Town, Kettering Town, Chelmsford City, Oxford City, Brentwood Town, Hendon, Enfield, Hillingdon Borough, Margate, Barnet, Carshalton Athletic, Walton & Hersham, Dagenham, Wimbledon, Cheltenham Town, Weymouth, Yeovil Town and Falmouth Town.

Those appearing in the competition proper for the first time were Whitby Town, Kirkby Town, Alfreton Town and Carshalton Athletic. Of the others, Walton & Hersham had last featured at this stage in 1957–58, Hillingdon Borough (known at the time as Yiewsley) had last done so in 1956–57 and Mossley had last done so in 1949–50.

Between 20 September 1969 and 12 January 1970, Hillingdon Borough competed in eleven Cup fixtures while progressing from the first qualifying round to the third round proper. They defeated Tooting & Mitcham United (after a replay), Bromley, Tilbury, Dartford (after a second replay), Wimbledon and Luton Town before losing to Sutton United at Gander Green Lane after another replay.

== Results ==
=== First round proper ===
At this stage the 48 clubs from the Football League Third and Fourth Divisions joined the 30 non-league clubs who came through the qualifying rounds. The final two non-league sides in the main draw, North Shields and Sutton United were given byes to this stage as the champions and runners-up from the previous season's FA Amateur Cup.

Matches were scheduled to be played on Saturday, 15 November 1969. Thirteen matches were drawn, of which two went to second replays and one of these to a third.

Tie no	Home team	Score	Away team	Date
1	Darlington	0–0	Barnsley	15 November 1969
Replay	Barnsley	2–0	Darlington	18 November 1969
2	Hartlepool	3–0	North Shields	15 November 1969
3	Bournemouth & Boscombe Athletic	1–1	Luton Town	15 November 1969
Replay	Luton Town	3–1	Bournemouth & Boscombe Athletic	18 November 1969
4	Bury	2–2	Mansfield Town	15 November 1969
Replay	Mansfield Town	2–0	Bury	19 November 1969
5	Yeovil Town	2–3	Shrewsbury Town	15 November 1969
6	Walsall	0–0	Orient	15 November 1969
Replay	Orient	0–2	Walsall	17 November 1969
7	Notts County	0–3	Rotherham United	15 November 1969
8	Macclesfield Town	1–1	Scunthorpe United	15 November 1969
Replay	Scunthorpe United	4–2	Macclesfield Town	18 November 1969
9	Lincoln City	2–0	Southport	15 November 1969
10	Doncaster Rovers	1–1	Crewe Alexandra	15 November 1969
Replay	Crewe Alexandra	0–1	Doncaster Rovers	19 November 1969
11	Tranmere Rovers	3–0	Chesterfield	15 November 1969
12	Stockport County	1–1	Mossley	15 November 1969
Replay	Mossley	0–1	Stockport County	18 November 1969
13	Bangor City	6–0	Kirkby Town	15 November 1969
14	Brentford	0–0	Plymouth Argyle	15 November 1969
Replay	Plymouth Argyle	2–0	Brentford	19 November 1969
15	Northampton Town	0–0	Weymouth	15 November 1969
Replay	Weymouth	1–3	Northampton Town	19 November 1969
16	Brighton & Hove Albion	2–1	Enfield	15 November 1969
17	Bradford City	2–1	Grimsby Town	15 November 1969
18	Oldham Athletic	3–1	Grantham	15 November 1969
19	Spennymoor United	1–4	Wrexham	15 November 1969
20	Southend United	0–0	Gillingham	15 November 1969
Replay	Gillingham	2–1	Southend United	19 November 1969
21	Exeter City	2–0	Fulham	15 November 1969
22	Alfreton Town	1–1	Barrow	15 November 1969
Replay	Barrow	0–0	Alfreton Town	17 November 1969
Replay	Alfreton Town	2–2	Barrow	20 November 1969
Replay	Barrow	2–0	Alfreton Town	24 November 1969
23	Halifax Town	3–3	Chester	15 November 1969
Replay	Chester	1–0	Halifax Town	19 November 1969
24	Newport County	2–1	Colchester United	15 November 1969
25	Margate	2–7	Aldershot	15 November 1969
26	Cheltenham Town	0–2	Oxford City	15 November 1969
27	Workington	2–1	Rochdale	15 November 1969
28	York City	2–0	Whitby Town	15 November 1969
29	Kettering Town	0–2	Swansea Town	15 November 1969
30	Wigan Athletic	1–1	Port Vale	15 November 1969
Replay	Port Vale	2–2	Wigan Athletic	18 November 1969
Replay	Port Vale	1–0	Wigan Athletic	24 November 1969
31	Tamworth	2–1	Torquay United	15 November 1969
32	South Shields	2–1	Bradford Park Avenue	15 November 1969
33	Chelmsford City	1–2	Hereford United	15 November 1969
34	Walton & Hersham	0–1	Barnet	15 November 1969
35	Hendon	5–3	Carshalton Athletic	15 November 1969
36	Dagenham	0–1	Sutton United	15 November 1969
37	Falmouth Town	1–4	Peterborough United	15 November 1969
38	Hillingdon Borough	2–0	Wimbledon	15 November 1969
39	Brentwood Town	1–0	Reading	15 November 1969
40	Telford United	0–3	Bristol Rovers	15 November 1969

=== Second round proper ===
The matches were scheduled for Saturday, 6 December 1969. Seven matches were drawn, with replays taking place later the same week. Two games needed a second replay, and one of these a third.

Tie no	Home team	Score	Away team	Date
1	Chester	1–1	Doncaster Rovers	6 December 1969
Replay	Doncaster Rovers	0–2	Chester	9 December 1969
2	Hartlepool	0–1	Wrexham	6 December 1969
3	Barnet	0–2	Sutton United	6 December 1969
4	Gillingham	6–0	Tamworth	6 December 1969
5	Shrewsbury Town	1–2	Mansfield Town	6 December 1969
6	Stockport County	0–0	Scunthorpe United	6 December 1969
Replay	Scunthorpe United	4–0	Stockport County	9 December 1969
7	Oxford City	1–5	Swansea Town	6 December 1969
8	Bangor City	0–0	York City	6 December 1969
Replay	York City	2–0	Bangor City	9 December 1969
9	Barnsley	3–0	Barrow	6 December 1969
10	Northampton Town	1–1	Exeter City	6 December 1969
Replay	Exeter City	0–0	Northampton Town	9 December 1969
Replay	Northampton Town	2–1	Exeter City	15 December 1969
11	Brighton & Hove Albion	1–1	Walsall	6 December 1969
Replay	Walsall	1–1	Brighton & Hove Albion	9 December 1969
Replay	Brighton & Hove Albion	0–0	Walsall	15 December 1969
Replay	Brighton & Hove Albion	1–2	Walsall	17 December 1969
12	Bradford City	3–0	Lincoln City	6 December 1969
13	Port Vale	2–2	Tranmere Rovers	6 December 1969
Replay	Tranmere Rovers	3–1	Port Vale	8 December 1969
14	Newport County	2–1	Hereford United	6 December 1969
15	Rotherham United	3–0	Workington	6 December 1969
16	Aldershot	3–1	Bristol Rovers	6 December 1969
17	Peterborough United	2–0	Plymouth Argyle	6 December 1969
18	South Shields	0–0	Oldham Athletic	6 December 1969
Replay	Oldham Athletic	1–2	South Shields	9 December 1969
19	Hendon	0–2	Brentwood Town	6 December 1969
20	Hillingdon Borough	2–1	Luton Town	6 December 1969

=== Third round proper ===
The 44 First and Second Division clubs entered the competition at this stage. The matches were scheduled Saturday, 3 January 1970, but three were played at later dates. Nine matches were drawn and went to replays, with York City and Cardiff City requiring a second replay at Birmingham City's St Andrew's ground.

Tie no	Home team	Score	Away team	Date
1	Chester	2–1	Bristol City	3 January 1970
2	Burnley	3–0	Wolverhampton Wanderers	3 January 1970
3	Preston North End	1–1	Derby County	3 January 1970
Replay	Derby County	4–1	Preston North End	7 January 1970
4	Southampton	3–0	Newcastle United	3 January 1970
5	Gillingham	1–0	Newport County	3 January 1970
6	Leicester City	1–0	Sunderland	3 January 1970
7	Nottingham Forest	0–0	Carlisle United	3 January 1970
Replay	Carlisle United	2–1	Nottingham Forest	6 January 1970
8	Blackburn Rovers	0–4	Swindon Town	3 January 1970
9	Aston Villa	1–1	Charlton Athletic	3 January 1970
Replay	Charlton Athletic	1–0	Aston Villa	12 January 1970
10	Sheffield Wednesday	2–1	West Bromwich Albion	3 January 1970
11	Bolton Wanderers	1–2	Watford	3 January 1970
12	Middlesbrough	2–1	West Ham United	3 January 1970
13	Sheffield United	2–1	Everton	3 January 1970
14	Ipswich Town	0–1	Manchester United	3 January 1970
15	Queens Park Rangers	4–1	South Shields	3 January 1970
16	Coventry City	1–1	Liverpool	7 January 1970
Replay	Liverpool	3–0	Coventry City	12 January 1970
17	Portsmouth	1–2	Tranmere Rovers	3 January 1970
18	Norwich City	1–2	Wrexham	3 January 1970
19	Bradford City	2–2	Tottenham Hotspur	3 January 1970
Replay	Tottenham Hotspur	5–0	Bradford City	7 January 1970
20	Hull City	0–1	Manchester City	3 January 1970
21	Crystal Palace	2–0	Walsall	3 January 1970
22	Chelsea	3–0	Birmingham City	3 January 1970
23	Scunthorpe United	2–1	Millwall	3 January 1970
24	Huddersfield Town	1–1	Aldershot	3 January 1970
Replay	Aldershot	3–1	Huddersfield Town	12 January 1970
25	Mansfield Town	3–2	Barnsley	3 January 1970
26	Arsenal	1–1	Blackpool	3 January 1970
Replay	Blackpool	3–2	Arsenal	15 January 1970
27	Leeds United	2–1	Swansea Town	3 January 1970
28	York City	1–1	Cardiff City	3 January 1970
Replay	Cardiff City	1–1	York City	12 January 1970
Replay	Cardiff City	1–3	York City	15 January 1970
29	Rotherham United	0–1	Peterborough United	3 January 1970
30	Oxford United	0–0	Stoke City	3 January 1970
Replay	Stoke City	3–2	Oxford United	7 January 1970
31	Hillingdon Borough	0–0	Sutton United	6 January 1970
Replay	Sutton United	4–1	Hillingdon Borough	12 January 1970
32	Brentwood Town	0–1	Northampton Town	12 January 1970

=== Fourth round proper ===
The matches were scheduled for Saturday, 24 January 1970. Five matches were drawn, with the replays taking place three or four days later. Sutton United was the last non-league club left in the competition.

Tie no	Home team	Score	Away team	Date
1	Blackpool	0–2	Mansfield Town	24 January 1970
2	Liverpool	3–1	Wrexham	24 January 1970
3	Southampton	1–1	Leicester City	24 January 1970
Replay	Leicester City	4–2	Southampton	28 January 1970
4	Sutton United	0–6	Leeds United	24 January 1970
5	Watford	1–0	Stoke City	24 January 1970
6	Gillingham	5–1	Peterborough United	24 January 1970
7	Sheffield Wednesday	1–2	Scunthorpe United	24 January 1970
8	Middlesbrough	4–1	York City	24 January 1970
9	Derby County	3–0	Sheffield United	24 January 1970
10	Swindon Town	4–2	Chester	24 January 1970
11	Tranmere Rovers	0–0	Northampton Town	24 January 1970
Replay	Northampton Town	2–1	Tranmere Rovers	27 January 1970
12	Tottenham Hotspur	0–0	Crystal Palace	24 January 1970
Replay	Crystal Palace	1–0	Tottenham Hotspur	28 January 1970
13	Manchester United	3–0	Manchester City	24 January 1970
14	Carlisle United	2–2	Aldershot	24 January 1970
Replay	Aldershot	1–4	Carlisle United	28 January 1970
15	Chelsea	2–2	Burnley	24 January 1970
Replay	Burnley	1–3	Chelsea	27 January 1970
16	Charlton Athletic	2–3	Queens Park Rangers	24 January 1970

=== Fifth round proper ===
The matches were scheduled for Saturday, 7 February 1970, with one replay played four days later.

George Best famously scored 6 goals for Manchester United in their 8–2 win against Northampton Town at the County Ground.

Tie no	Home team	Score	Away team	Date
1	Liverpool	0–0	Leicester City	7 February 1970
Replay	Leicester City	0–2	Liverpool	11 February 1970
2	Watford	2–1	Gillingham	7 February 1970
3	Swindon Town	3–1	Scunthorpe United	7 February 1970
4	Queens Park Rangers	1–0	Derby County	7 February 1970
5	Northampton Town	2–8	Manchester United	7 February 1970
6	Carlisle United	1–2	Middlesbrough	7 February 1970
7	Crystal Palace	1–4	Chelsea	7 February 1970
8	Leeds United	2–0	Mansfield Town	7 February 1970

=== Sixth round proper ===
The four quarter-final ties were played on the 21 February 1970. There was one replay on the following Wednesday.

21 February 1970
15:00

Middlesbrough	1–1	Manchester United
Hickton 37'		Sartori 13'

Ayresome Park, Middlesbrough
Attendance: c 40,000
21 February 1970
15:00

Queens Park Rangers	2–4	Chelsea
Venables 27' (pen.); Bridges 90'		Webb 7'; Osgood 8', 44', 58'

Loftus Road, London
21 February 1970
15:00

Swindon Town	0–2	Leeds United
		Clarke 32', 34'

County Ground, Swindon
Attendance: 27,500
21 February 1970
15:00

Watford	1–0	Liverpool
Endean 63'	Report

Vicarage Road, Watford
Attendance: 34,047
Referee: D.W. Smith

Replay

25 February 1970
19:45

Manchester United	2–1	Middlesbrough
Charlton 26'; Morgan 78' (pen.)		Hickton 74'

Old Trafford, Manchester
Attendance: 63,418

=== Semi-finals ===
The semi-final matches were played on Saturday, 14 March 1970 with the Manchester United–Leeds United tie needing two replays to settle the contest over the following 12 days, with the tie needing 219 minutes to produce a goal. Manchester United were made to pay for missed chances in the first two games, including George Best falling over the ball in the first replay, as Leeds came through in the second replay with a Billy Bremner goal. Chelsea came through the other semi final to meet Leeds at Wembley.

14 March 1970
15:00

Manchester United	0–0	Leeds United
	Report

Hillsborough, Sheffield
Referee: Jack Taylor, Wolverhampton
14 March 1970
15:00

Chelsea	5–1	Watford
Webb 3'; Osgood 58'; Houseman 73', 79'; Hutchinson 75'	Report	Garbett 12'

White Hart Lane, London
Referee: Gordon Hill, Leicestershire

Replay

23 March 1970
19:45

Manchester United	0–0 (a.e.t.)	Leeds United
	Report

Villa Park, Birmingham
Attendance: 62,500
Referee: Jack Taylor, Wolverhampton

Second Replay

26 March 1970
19:45

Manchester United	0–1	Leeds United
	Report	Bremner 9'

Burnden Park, Bolton
Attendance: 56,000
Referee: Jack Taylor, Wolverhampton

=== Third place play-off ===
Between 1970 and 1974, a third place playoff between the two losing semi-finalists was held.

10 April 1970

Manchester United	2–0	Watford
Kidd

Highbury, London
Attendance: 15,105

=== Final ===
The 1970 FA Cup Final was contested by Leeds United and Chelsea at Wembley on the 11 April 1970. The match finished as a 2–2 draw after extra time and so went to a replay. The second final match took place at Old Trafford, Manchester on the 29 April 1970. This match finished 1–1 after 90 minutes, again requiring extra time to be played before Chelsea finished as the victors.

11 April 1970
15:00 BST

Chelsea	2–2 (a.e.t.)	Leeds United
Houseman 41'; Hutchinson 86'	Report	Charlton 20'; Jones 84'

Wembley Stadium, London
Attendance: 100,000
Referee: Eric Jennings

==== Replay ====
29 April 1970

Chelsea	2 – 1 (a.e.t.)	Leeds United
Osgood 78'; Webb 104'	Report	Jones 35'

Old Trafford, Manchester
Attendance: 62,078
Referee: Eric Jennings
