= Tommy Baldwin =

English footballer (1945–2024)

Personal information
- Full name: Thomas Baldwin
- Date of birth: 10 June 1945
- Place of birth: Gateshead, England
- Date of death: 22 January 2024 (aged 78)
- Height: 1.78 m (5 ft 10 in)
- Positions: Midfielder; forward

Youth career
- Wrekenton Juniors
- Arsenal

Senior career*
Years	Team	Apps	(Gls)
1962–1966	Arsenal	17	(7)
1966–1974	Chelsea	187	(73)
1974	→ Millwall (loan)	6	(1)
1974	→ Manchester United (loan)	2	(0)
- Gravesend & Northfleet
1975	Seattle Sounders	15	(5)
1977–1978	Brentford	4	(1)
Total		231	(88)

International career
1968	England U23	2	(0)
- * Club domestic league appearances and goals

Thomas Baldwin (10 June 1945 – 22 January 2024) was an English footballer who played as a midfielder or forward in The Football League for Arsenal, Chelsea, Millwall, Manchester United and Brentford. He was capped twice by England at under-23 level.

== Career ==
Baldwin was born in Gateshead and played for Wrekenton Juniors before joining Arsenal. He turned professional in 1962, and made his league debut in the 3–0 defeat of Birmingham City in April 1965. In September 1966, he scored Arsenal's first ever goal in the League Cup competition, shortly before transferring to Chelsea in part-exchange for George Graham in 1966. Playing in an attacking role, he scored 17 goals in his first season, including one on his debut against Manchester City, and played in the 1967 FA Cup Final as Chelsea lost 2–1 to Tottenham Hotspur at Wembley.

Baldwin scored 16 goals in each of the next two seasons, but those years finished trophy-less. In 1970, he played in the Cup Final against Leeds United, this time finishing on the winning side as Chelsea won 2–1 in a replay. The following year, Baldwin helped inspire the side to a 2–1 win over Real Madrid in the Cup Winners' Cup final replay in Athens, but after that his star began to fade. Injuries, loss of form and disagreements with manager Dave Sexton over his social activities combined to reduce his opportunities to play, and after spells on loan at Manchester United and Millwall, in non-league football with Gravesend & Northfleet, and on non-contract terms at Brentford, he joined the coaching staff at Brentford. He had made a total of 239 appearances for Chelsea, scoring 91 goals. In 1975, Baldwin played for the Seattle Sounders of the North American Soccer League. In 1976, the Sounders traded the rights to Baldwin to the Vancouver Whitecaps in exchange for Chris Bennett, but Baldwin did not sign with Vancouver.

== Nickname ==
It was thought that Baldwin was known as 'the sponge' for his ability, under pressure, to hold the ball and shield it skilfully from opponents while seeking an opening to set up an attack, but according to his interview on The Chelsea Special podcast, it was because of his ability to soak up alcohol while in the pub with his teammates.

== Death ==
Baldwin died on 22 January 2024 after a long battle with illness, at the age of 78.

== Honours ==
Chelsea

- FA Cup: 1969–70; runner-up: 1966–67
- Football League Cup runner-up: 1971–72
