= Dave Sexton =

English football manager (1930–2012)

Dave Sexton OBE
Personal information
- Full name: David James Sexton
- Date of birth: 6 April 1930
- Place of birth: Islington, London, England
- Date of death: 25 November 2012 (aged 82)
- Position: Inside forward

Senior career*
Years	Team	Apps	(Gls)
- Newmarket Town
1950–1951	Chelmsford City	4	(0)
1951–1952	Luton Town	9	(1)
1952–1955	West Ham United	74	(27)
1956–1957	Leyton Orient	24	(4)
1957–1958	Brighton & Hove Albion	49	(26)
1959	Crystal Palace	27	(11)
Total		187	(69)

Managerial career
- 1965: Leyton Orient
- 1967–1974: Chelsea
- 1974–1977: Queens Park Rangers
- 1977–1981: Manchester United
- 1977–1990: England U21
- 1981–1983: Coventry City
- 1994–1996: England U21
- * Club domestic league appearances and goals

David James Sexton OBE (6 April 1930 – 25 November 2012) was an English football manager and player. He was notable for managing Chelsea to their first European trophy.

== Playing career ==
Son of former professional boxer Archie Sexton, he started his professional career with Luton Town in 1951, following spells with non-league clubs Newmarket Town and Chelmsford City. Playing mainly at inside-forward, he would finish his career with time at West Ham United, Leyton Orient, Brighton and Hove Albion, and Crystal Palace. His biggest success came at Brighton, where he won the Third Division (South) Title in 1957–58.

== Coaching and managerial career ==
Sexton started off as a coach at Chelsea, before leaving to begin his managerial career at Leyton Orient in 1965. In January 1966 he was appointed as coach at Fulham, replacing Ron Burgess, where in five months he saved the club from certain relegation. He left at the end of the season, much to the club's disappointment and he was appointed by Arsenal manager Bertie Mee as the Gunners' first-team coach in August 1966, but a year later returned to Chelsea to become manager following the departure of Tommy Docherty. He led the club to FA Cup success in 1970 and the European Cup Winners' Cup a year later. Chelsea also reached the League Cup final in 1972, but lost to Stoke City. However, Sexton fell out with several players, including Peter Osgood and Alan Hudson, who were subsequently sold. This, combined with other problems at the club, ensured that Sexton did not come close to repeating his earlier success and early in the 1974–75 season – which ended in Chelsea's relegation – he was dismissed.

A few weeks later in October 1974 he was appointed manager of Queens Park Rangers as successor to Gordon Jago. With a team containing the likes of Stan Bowles and Gerry Francis, as well as players recruited from ex-club Chelsea, John Hollins and David Webb, Sexton took Rangers to within a point of the League title in 1975–76. The 3–2 defeat at Norwich City in their final away game of that season marked the end of a 14-match unbeaten run which had produced a spectacular 13 wins and one draw. They were top after playing their final home game versus Leeds United on 24 April 1976, but Liverpool's late 3–1 win over Wolverhampton Wanderers on 4 May 1976 denied them their first-ever league title. Still, second place was – and remains – their highest league finish. UEFA Cup qualification came as consolation.

Sexton took over at Manchester United – again succeeding Tommy Docherty – in the middle of 1977 but his reign was characterised by dour football and he was not popular with the fans. In appointing Sexton it appeared as if the United board had again opted for safety following the tumultuous tenure of Docherty (sacked for having an affair with the wife of the club's physiotherapist), whose four-and-a-half-year spell had overseen relegation from the First Division but an immediate comeback followed by high league finishes and completed with an FA Cup triumph in the season before Sexton's appointment.

The highlight was an FA Cup final appearance in 1979, losing 3–2 to Arsenal in a dramatic match, and finishing as league runners-up to Liverpool in 1979–80. His signings brought mixed success. Midfielder Ray Wilkins was bought from Chelsea in 1979 and soon established himself as one of Europe's finest midfielders, and striker Joe Jordan scored more than 50 goals in three years after arriving from Leeds United in 1978. On a less positive note, Sexton paid a club record £1.25 million for Nottingham Forest striker Garry Birtles in 1980, but a player who had been one of the country's finest goalscorers with his old club failed to find the net once in 25 league appearances during the 1980–81 season.

Sexton was dismissed on 30 April 1981, despite having won his final seven games in charge, as United had finished eighth in the league and Sexton had now been in charge of them for four seasons without winning a major trophy. The FA Cup final appearance two years earlier and the narrow second-place finish behind Liverpool a year earlier was of little consolation.

A few weeks after being dismissed, he was appointed as manager of Coventry City. In his first season, he managed a relatively average 14th-place finish (which was still a slight improvement on the previous year), and the club appeared to be making progress, with the side mounting a serious challenge for the UEFA Cup places halfway through the 1982–83 season. However, a disastrous end to the campaign saw them win just once in their last fifteen games, with the club only avoiding relegation in the penultimate game of the season, which led to Sexton's dismissal. This would prove to be his last role in club management.

Sexton also had a very successful period as coach of the England's Under-21 side, and won the UEFA Under 21s Championship twice, in 1982 and 1984. After that he went on to become the FA's first Technical Director at the FA's National School at Lilleshall in 1984. He also wrote a book on coaching a football team for coaches of all levels called "Tackle Soccer."

He later lived in Kenilworth, Warwickshire, where in 2008 he was commemorated with a new building in the town centre. He lived in Kenilworth after becoming Coventry City manager in 1981 and the building in his honour, Sexton House, is a refurbished building divided between shops and offices.

== Managerial statistics ==
Team	Nat	From	To	Record				
Team	Nat	From	To	G	W	D	L	Win %
Leyton Orient	(England)	January 1965	December 1965	37	7	20	10	18.92
Chelsea	(England)	October 1967	October 1974	333	140	93	100	42.04
Queens Park Rangers	(England)	October 1974	July 1977	130	57	41	32	43.85
Manchester United	(England)	July 1977	April 1981	201	81	56	64	40.30
England Under-21s	(England)	1977	1990	90	52	16	22	57.78
Coventry City	(England)	May 1981	May 1983	88	28	39	21	31.82
England Under-21s	(England)	1994	1996	27	17	8	2	62.96

== Honours ==
=== Player ===
Leyton Orient

- Football League Third Division South: 1954–55

Brighton & Hove Albion

- Football League Third Division South: 1957–58

=== Manager ===
Chelsea

- FA Cup: 1969–70
- European Cup Winners' Cup: 1970–71
- Football League Cup runner-up: 1971–72

Manchester United

- FA Charity Shield: 1977 (shared)
- FA Cup runner-up: 1978–79

England U21

- UEFA U21 Championship: 1982, 1984

=== Individual ===
- Officer of the Order of the British Empire (OBE), for services to football: 2005
