= Peter Bonetti =

English footballer (1941–2020)

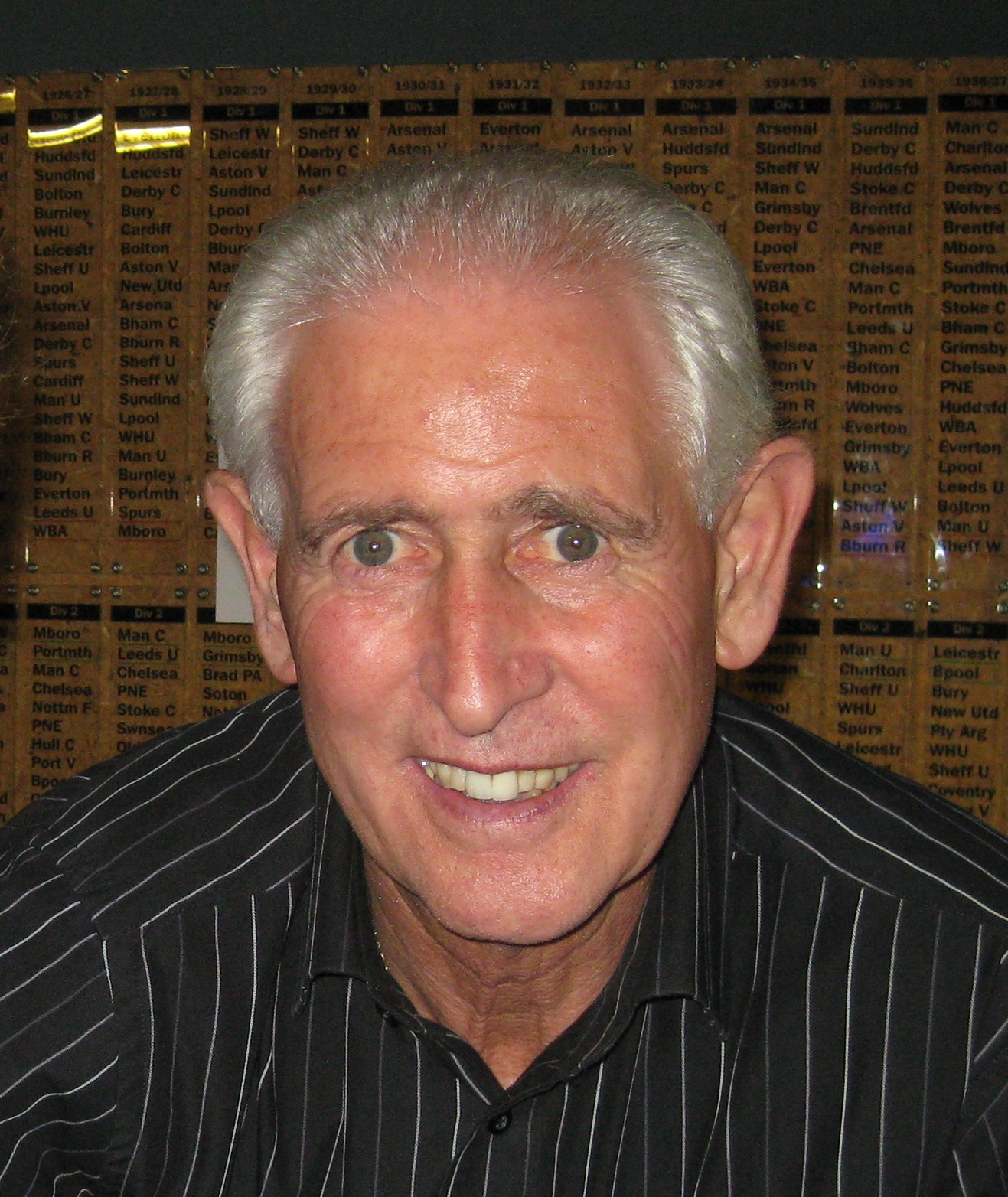
- Bonetti in 2009

Personal information
- Full name: Peter Philip Bonetti
- Date of birth: 27 September 1941
- Place of birth: Putney, England
- Date of death: 12 April 2020 (aged 78)
- Height: 5 ft 10 in (1.77 m)
- Position: Goalkeeper

Youth career
- Worthing
- Reading
- Chelsea

Senior career*
Years	Team	Apps	(Gls)
1959–1975	Chelsea	495	(0)
1975	St. Louis Stars	21	(0)
1975–1979	Chelsea	105	(0)
1979	Dundee United	5	(0)
1986	Woking	2	(0)
Total		628	(0)

International career
1966–1970	England	7	(0)
Medal record
Men's football
Representing England
FIFA World Cup
Winner	1966 England
- * Club domestic league appearances and goals

Peter Philip Bonetti (27 September 1941 – 12 April 2020) was an English professional footballer who played as a goalkeeper for Chelsea, the St. Louis Stars, Dundee United and England. He was known for his safe handling, lightning reflexes and his graceful style, for which he was given the nickname "The Cat". He was one of several goalkeepers (Gordon West of Everton was another) who specialised in a one-armed throw which could achieve a similar distance to a drop kick.

Bonetti played seven times for England, but mainly served the team as a back-up to Gordon Banks; he was part of the winning England squad for the 1966 FIFA World Cup, but did not play. He belatedly received a winners' medal in 2009, after the Football Association led a successful campaign for non-playing members of the squad to be recognised. After Banks fell ill before the 1970 FIFA World Cup quarter-final, Bonetti played as England lost 3–2 to West Germany.

== Early life ==
Bonetti was born in Putney, southwest London. His family moved to Worthing, Sussex in 1948. His parents ran a café on the seafront next to the Dome Cinema. They were Swiss-Italian emigrants from Ticino. Bonetti attended St Mary's Catholic Primary School, Worthing. He shone at an early age, playing for Worthing.

== Club career ==
=== Chelsea ===
Chelsea signed him from the Reading youth team after his mother had written to manager Ted Drake, requesting that he give her son a trial. Whilst a Chelsea junior, Bonetti made five appearances for Croydon Amateurs in the Surrey Senior League thanks to youth team coach Albert Tennant who was also coaching Croydon at that time. He made his first team debut in 1960, and a few weeks later helped the Chelsea youth team win the FA Youth Cup. From the 1960–61 season onward, he was Chelsea's first-choice goalkeeper, a position he held more-or-less constantly for the next nineteen years.

Chelsea were relegated in Bonetti's second full season, which saw the appointment of Tommy Docherty as manager. Bonetti emerged as a key figure in a talented young team which included Bobby Tambling, Terry Venables, John Hollins and Barry Bridges. The team went into the penultimate match of the season needing to beat promotion rivals Sunderland to have a chance of going up. Chelsea won 1–0, with Bonetti making a brilliant last minute save to deny George Mulhall and maintain his team's promotion chances; a 7–0 win over Portsmouth secured instant promotion back to the First Division.

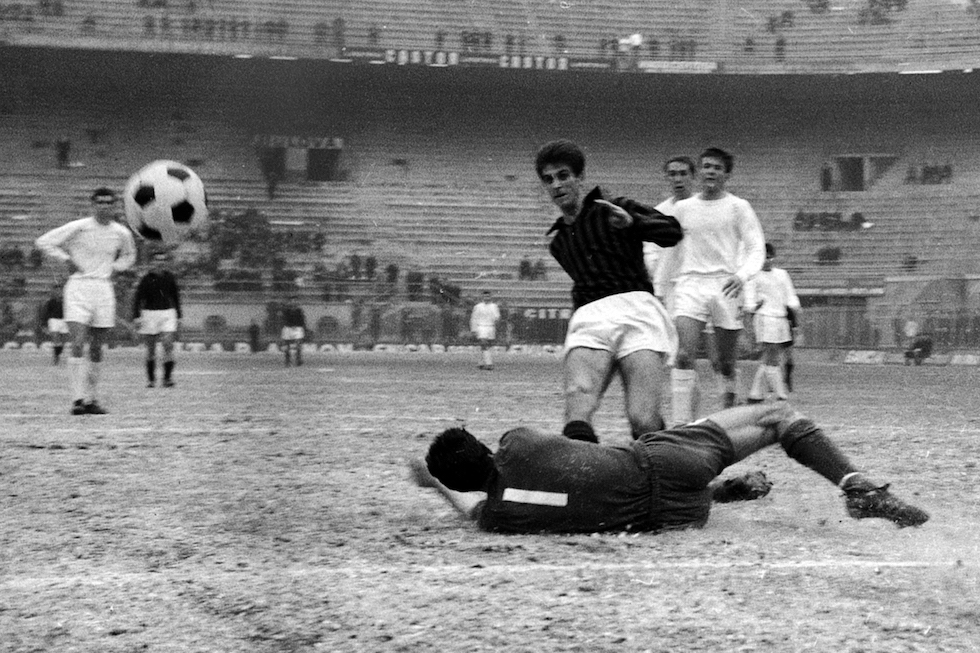
Bonetti (no. 1) playing for Chelsea in 1966

The new Chelsea team challenged for honours during the 1960s, with Bonetti a key figure throughout, although more often than not the team narrowly missed out. The club won the League Cup in 1965 with a 3–2 aggregate victory over Leicester City. Leicester put Chelsea under heavy pressure in the second leg at Filbert Street, but an inspired performance from Bonetti helped secure a 0–0 draw, and thus the trophy for his team. For most of that season Chelsea were on course to add both the league title and the FA Cup, but ultimately missed out. They were beaten by Liverpool in the FA Cup; meanwhile, their title challenge ended with a few matches left, following a bust-up between Docherty and several of his first-team players (though not Bonetti). The disunity behind the scenes meant that a much-weakened team was fielded in a key match against Burnley, in which Bonetti conceded six goals.

Bonetti played in every match of Chelsea's Inter-Cities Fairs Cup run the following season, putting in a series of impressive displays against the likes of Roma, A.C. Milan and Barcelona, though the team was eventually knocked out in the semi-final, as they were in the FA Cup for the second consecutive year. The signing of Alex Stepney at the end of that season briefly threatened his position as Chelsea's first-choice goalkeeper, and he considered putting in a transfer request, but Stepney ultimately made only one appearance for the club and was sold to Manchester United a few months later. Chelsea eventually reached an FA Cup final in 1967, where they faced Tottenham Hotspur, but the team got outplayed on the day and Bonetti could do little to stop Spurs winning 2–1.

That was the closest he came to winning another trophy with Chelsea until 1970, by which time Docherty had been succeeded by Dave Sexton. In 1970, Chelsea again reached the FA Cup final and this time faced reigning league champions Leeds United. Over the two fiercely contested matches, Bonetti had what was perhaps the finest moment of his playing career. Chelsea were outplayed for large spells in the first final at Wembley Stadium and he made a series of crucial saves to help them emerge with a 2–2 draw. Shortly into the replay at Old Trafford, his left knee was badly injured after a challenge from Leeds' Mick Jones. He returned to the field after treatment, but was effectively playing on one leg for the rest of the match and was powerless to stop Jones scoring the opener a few minutes later. In spite of the injury, and being targeted by the Leeds forwards, he made crucial saves throughout the match, denying both Peter Lorimer and Terry Cooper, and resisted more pressure from Leeds after Chelsea had taken the lead in extra time to help secure a 2–1 win. Such were Bonetti's performances that season, he was voted runner-up in the FWA Footballer of the Year awards.

A year later, the team added the European Cup Winners' Cup after another replayed win in the final, this time over Spanish giants Real Madrid in Athens. Chelsea took a 2–0 lead in the replay, but Real dominated for much of the second half, and it was another inspired performance from Bonetti that helped them hold on for a 2–1 win.

That was his last trophy with the club, although they narrowly missed out on more in the following years, losing in the 1972 League Cup final to Stoke City and in the semi-final of the same competition to Norwich City a year later. Financial and disciplinary problems within the club prevented them from building on their success.

=== St Louis Stars ===
Bonetti left on a free transfer in 1975, joining the St. Louis Stars of the North American Soccer League. That year, he made 21 appearances for the team and helped them top the Central Division that summer and reach the play-off semi-final.

=== Return to Chelsea ===
He then returned to Chelsea, where his experience proved invaluable in helping new manager Eddie McCreadie's young team gain promotion in 1976–77. Two years later, in May 1979, he played his final appearance for Chelsea, a 1–1 draw with Arsenal, having made a total of 729 appearances for the club in nineteen years – only Ron Harris has made more – and kept over 200 clean sheets. He conceded one goal or less in two-thirds of his appearances for Chelsea.

== International career ==
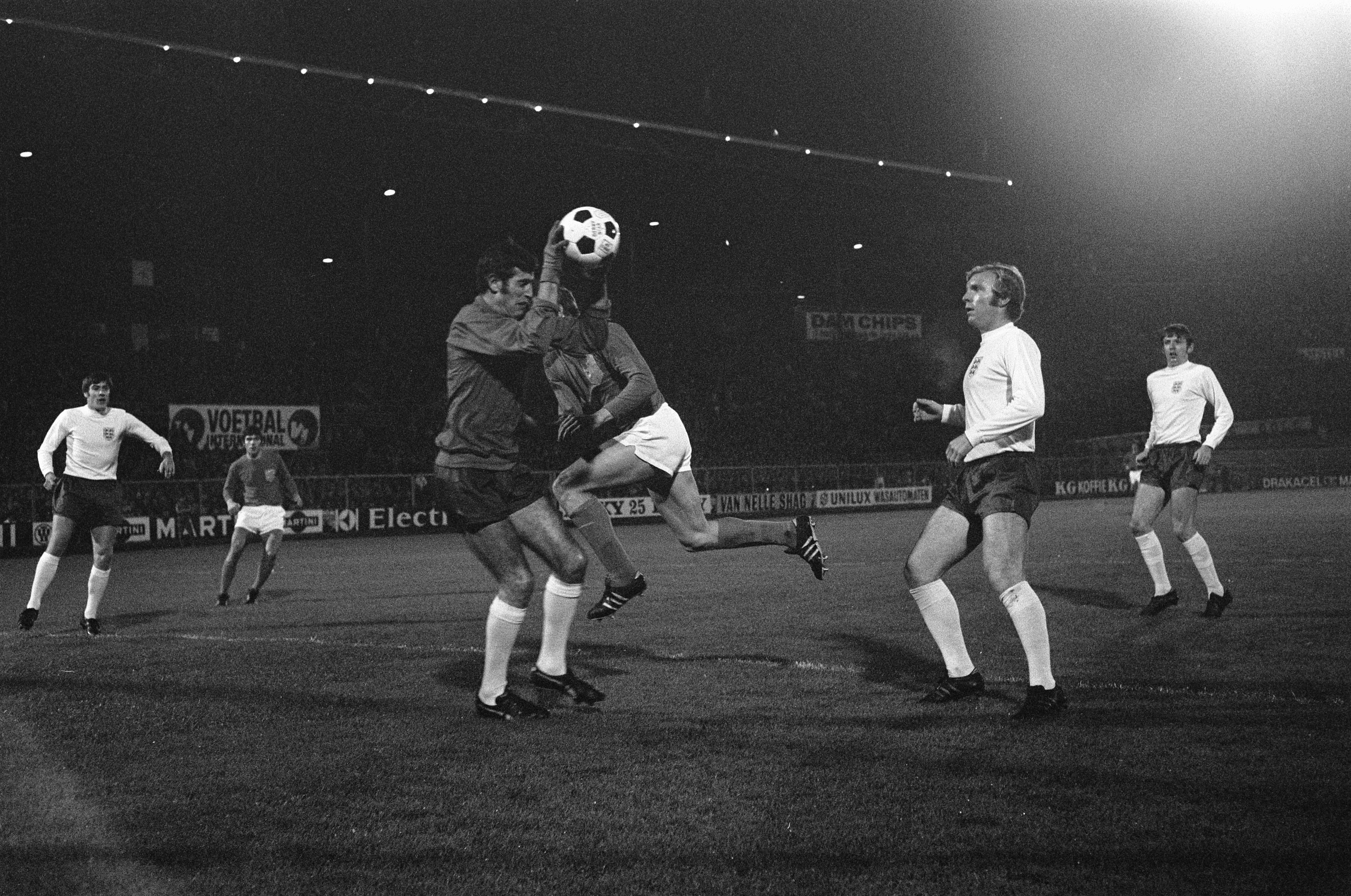
Bonetti (holding the ball) playing for England in 1969

Bonetti's England career is largely remembered for one match – the 1970 FIFA World Cup quarter-final against West Germany in Mexico. He was thrust into the starting line-up at only around an hour's notice, as a replacement for Banks who was suffering from severe food poisoning. England relinquished a 2–0 second-half lead and lost 3–2 after extra time. Bonetti received a large amount of blame from the public, as he was considered to have let in two easy goals in normal time, and never played for England again.

In the 1966 World Cup final, only the 11 players on the pitch at the end of the 4–2 win over West Germany received medals. Following a Football Association-led campaign to persuade FIFA to award medals to all winning squad members, Bonetti was presented with his medal by prime minister Gordon Brown at a ceremony at 10 Downing Street on 10 June 2009.

== Retirement ==
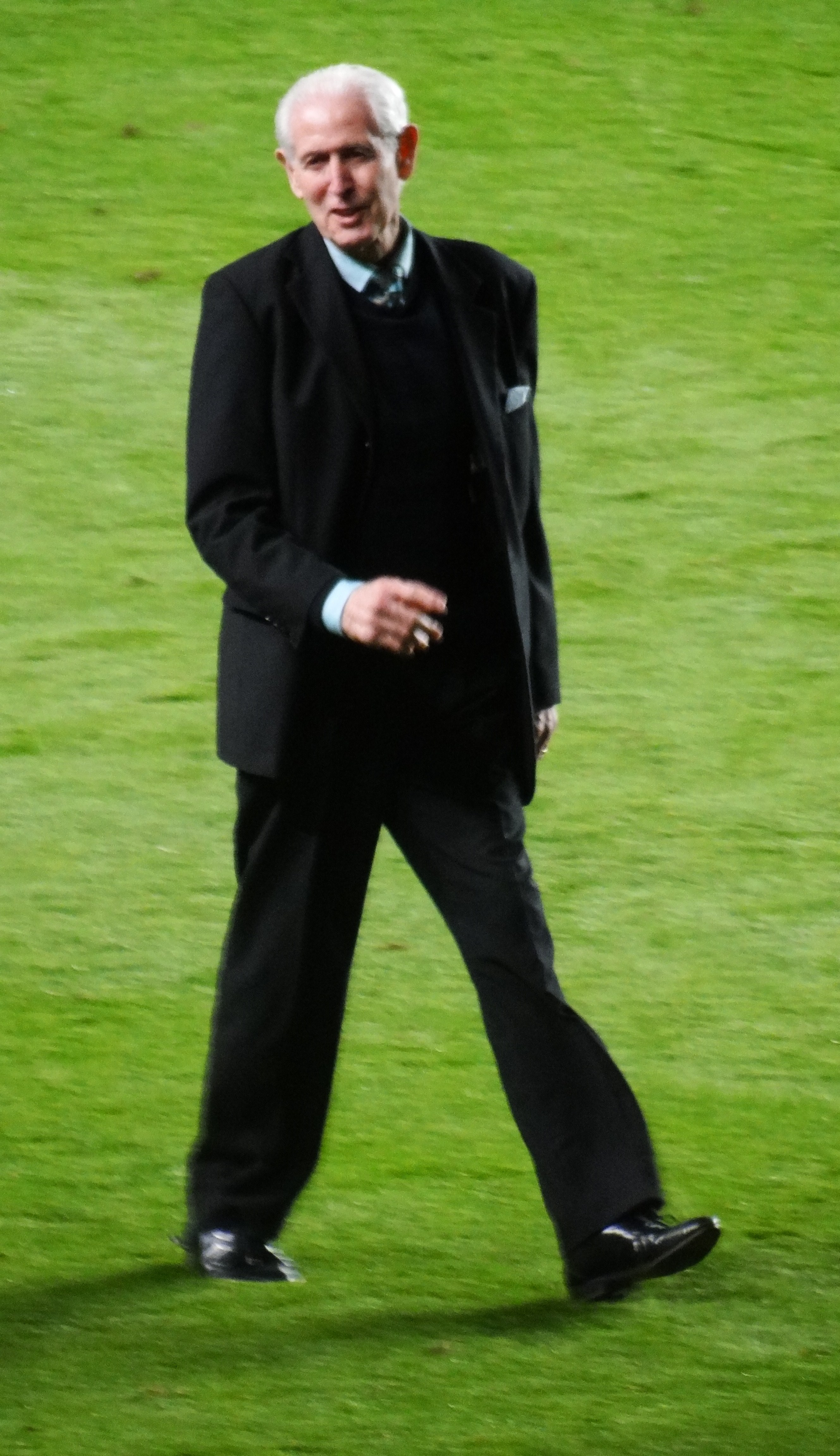
Bonetti in 2014

After leaving Chelsea, Bonetti moved to the Isle of Mull where he ran a guesthouse and became a postman. While living in Scotland, he briefly came out of retirement to make several appearances for Dundee United as understudy to Hamish McAlpine. Following his retirement from playing, Bonetti moved into coaching and had spells with Chelsea and the England national team, as well as working with Kevin Keegan at Newcastle United, Fulham and Manchester City.

During his time as a Chelsea coach, he was persuaded to play two matches for Isthmian League Division Two club Woking, including an FA Cup debut in a 1–0 win over Football Conference team Weymouth. At one time, he held the record for the most appearances for a single club by a goalkeeper, but was overtaken in the 1990s by Portsmouth's Alan Knight.

After 2005, Bonetti made several appearances for an Old England XI in various charity matches, notably against celebrity teams, usually coming on for the last 10 minutes of each match.

Bonetti died on 12 April 2020, aged 78, following a long illness. On 18 April 2022, his ashes were left behind the goal at the Shed End at Stamford Bridge.

== Career statistics ==
Appearances and goals by club, season and competition
Club	Season	League			National cup (Note: Includes FA Cup, U.S. Open Cup, Scottish Cup.)		League cup (Note: Includes League Cup, Scottish League Cup.)		Continental		Other		Total	
Club	Season	Division	Apps	Goals	Apps	Goals	Apps	Goals	Apps	Goals	Apps	Goals	Apps	Goals
Chelsea	1959–60	First Division	6	0	0	0	0	0	0	0	–		6	0
Chelsea	1960–61	First Division	36	0	1	0	3	0	0	0	–		40	0
Chelsea	1961–62	First Division	33	0	1	0	0	0	0	0	–		34	0
Chelsea	1962–63	Second Division	39	0	4	0	0	0	0	0	–		43	0
Chelsea	1963–64	First Division	35	0	0	0	1	0	0	0	–		36	0
Chelsea	1964–65	First Division	41	0	5	0	9	0	0	0	–		55	0
Chelsea	1965–66	First Division	38	0	6	0	0	0	12	0	–		56	0
Chelsea	1966–67	First Division	38	0	7	0	3	0	0	0	–		48	0
Chelsea	1967–68	First Division	40	0	5	0	1	0	0	0	–		46	0
Chelsea	1968–69	First Division	41	0	5	0	3	0	4	0	–		53	0
Chelsea	1969–70	First Division	36	0	8	0	4	0	0	0	–		48	0
Chelsea	1970–71	First Division	28	0	3	0	4	0	6	0	1 (Note: Appearance in Charity Shield)	0	42	0
Chelsea	1971–72	First Division	33	0	3	0	8	0	4	0	–		48	0
Chelsea	1972–73	First Division	23	0	0	0	5	0	0	0	–		28	0
Chelsea	1973–74	First Division	20	0	0	0	1	0	0	0	–		21	0
Chelsea	1974–75	First Division	8	0	0	0	0	0	0	0	–		8	0
Chelsea	Total		495	0	48	0	42	0	26	0	1	0	612	0
St. Louis Stars	1975	North American Soccer League	21	0							–			
Chelsea	1975–76	Second Division	27	0	4	0	0	0	0	0	–		31	0
Chelsea	1976–77	Second Division	31	0	0	0	2	0	0	0	–		33	0
Chelsea	1977–78	First Division	31	0	4	0	0	0	0	0	–		35	0
Chelsea	1978–79	First Division	16	0	1	0	1	0	0	0	–		18	0
Chelsea	Total		105	0	9	0	3	0	0	0	0	0	117	0
Dundee United	1979–80	Scottish Premier Division	5	0	0	0	2	0	0	0	–		7	0
Woking	1986–87	Isthmian League Second Division	2	0							–			
Career total			628	0							1	0		

== Honours ==
Chelsea Youth

- FA Youth Cup: 1959–60

Chelsea

- Football League Second Division promotion: 1962–63, 1976–77
- FA Cup: 1969–70; runner-up: 1966–67
- Football League Cup: 1964–65; runner-up: 1971–72
- European Cup Winners' Cup: 1970–71

St. Louis Stars

- North American Soccer League Central Division: 1975

England

- FIFA World Cup: 1966

Individual

- North American Soccer League All-Star First team: 1975
