= Ron Harris (English footballer) =

English footballer

Personal information
- Full name: Ronald Edward Harris
- Date of birth: 13 November 1944 (age 81)
- Place of birth: Hackney, London, England
- Height: 5 ft 8 in (1.73 m)
- Position: Defender

Youth career
- 1960–1962: Chelsea

Senior career*
Years	Team	Apps	(Gls)
1962–1980	Chelsea	655	(13)
1980–1983	Brentford	61	(0)
Total		716	(13)

International career
1966–1968	England U23	4	(0)

Managerial career
- 1984–1985: Aldershot
- * Club domestic league appearances and goals

Ronald Edward Harris (born 13 November 1944), known by the nickname "Chopper" for his tough style of defending, is an English former footballer who played for Chelsea in the 1960s, 1970s, and 1980s as a defender. Harris captained Chelsea to FA Cup and UEFA Cup Winners' Cup success, and made a club record 795 appearances. His brother Allan Harris was also a professional footballer and they were teammates at Chelsea in the mid-1960s.

== Chelsea ==
Harris was a member of the Chelsea side which won the FA Youth Cup in 1961 and made his senior club debut in February 1962 in a 1–0 win against Sheffield Wednesday. Within a year, he had established himself as a regular in the side, a position he would hold for the next eighteen years. He formed an important part of new Chelsea manager Tommy Docherty's youth-oriented re-building of the club after relegation from the First Division alongside the likes of Peter Bonetti, Peter Osgood and Bobby Tambling.

Upon the club's return to the top division, Harris solidified his reputation as an uncompromising – yet talented – defender with a series of strong (and sometimes notorious) performances. His first honours with Chelsea came with a League Cup win over Leicester City in 1965. In the same season, Chelsea were challenging for the league title for most of the year but ultimately finished third after winning just one of their final five matches. He became club captain the following year when Terry Venables left for Tottenham Hotspur and became the youngest ever captain to lead out a side in the 1967 FA Cup Final, although they lost 2–1 to Tottenham. Chelsea, led by Harris, reached another FA Cup final three years later, this time against Leeds United – a side then at their peak in English football. He won four caps for England U23 between 1966 and 1968.

That 1970 FA Cup Final is notorious for being one of the most physical of all time, it saw Harris come into his own in the role of both inspirational leader and uncompromising tackler. With Leeds having taken a 2–1 lead at Wembley with just six minutes remaining, it was his quick free kick which led to Ian Hutchinson's headed equaliser to take the game to a replay. During the replay at Old Trafford his late tackle on Leeds' playmaker Eddie Gray after just eight minutes (just one of many late tackles committed by both sides), left the latter a virtual passenger for the rest of the match: Chelsea eventually won 2–1 after extra-time.

The following season saw Harris lift Chelsea's first major European honour – the UEFA Cup Winners' Cup – in another replayed final against Real Madrid in Athens. Chelsea also reached a second League Cup final in 1972, but surprisingly lost to Stoke in what proved to be his last major final for the club.

== Moves ==
While many of Chelsea's star players departed during the 1970s (due to Peter Osgood and Alan Hudson falling out with manager Dave Sexton, and due to the financial crisis caused by the building of the new East Stand, and the financial impact of relegation), Harris remained ever-present in the side throughout a decade which saw them relegated twice and promoted once, although he was replaced as Club Captain by John Hollins at the tail end of the 1971/72 season. Harris was primarily a central defender in the mould of Bobby Moore and Norman Hunter but in later years he was often played out of position as circumstances dictated. After the retirement of Eddie McCreadie, he played at left back for a considerable time and was used as cover at right back when injuries left the financially struggling Chelsea short of cover.

In the closing stages of his career, he also played as a holding midfielder in a role similar to Claude Makélélé, even though the role never existed at that time, providing a screen for a defence that was often caught out by counter-attacks. Over an 18-year period Harris was rarely out of the first team. In 10 seasons he averaged 41 league games out of 42 and in 5 other seasons he averaged over 37 games. He finally left Chelsea in 1980 to become a player-coach at Brentford, having played a record 795 games for Chelsea. He later had a brief stint as player-manager of Aldershot.

== In retirement ==
Harris was a professional greyhound trainer for several years during the 1990s. He has also been an active part of the after dinner speaker circuit.

== Career statistics ==
Appearances and goals by club, season and competition
Club	Season	Division			FA Cup		League Cup		Europe		Other		Total	
Club	Season	Division	Apps	Goals	Apps	Goals	Apps	Goals	Apps	Goals	Apps	Goals	Apps	Goals
Chelsea	1961–62	First Division	3	0	0	0	0	0	—		—		3	0
Chelsea	1962–63	Second Division	7	0	0	0	0	0	—		—		7	0
Chelsea	1963–64	First Division	41	2	3	0	1	0	—		—		45	2
Chelsea	1964–65	First Division	42	2	5	0	6	0	—		—		53	2
Chelsea	1965–66	First Division	36	2	6	0	0	0	10 (Note: Appearances in Inter-Cities Fairs Cup)	0	—		52	2
Chelsea	1966–67	First Division	42	0	7	0	3	0	—		—		52	0
Chelsea	1967–68	First Division	40	0	5	0	1	0	—		—		46	0
Chelsea	1968–69	First Division	40	0	5	0	3	0	4	0	—		52	0
Chelsea	1969–70	First Division	30	0	8	0	3	0	—		—		41	0
Chelsea	1970–71	First Division	38	1	3	0	4	0	9 (Note: Appearances in UEFA Cup Winners' Cup)	0	1 (Note: Appearance in FA Charity Shield)	0	55	1
Chelsea	1971–72	First Division	41	0	3	0	9	0	4	1	—		57	1
Chelsea	1972–73	First Division	42	1	3	0	7	0	—		—		52	1
Chelsea	1973–74	First Division	36	2	2	0	1	0	—		—		39	2
Chelsea	1974–75	First Division	42	0	2	0	4	0	—		—		48	0
Chelsea	1975–76	Second Division	40	0	4	0	1	0	—		—		45	0
Chelsea	1976–77	Second Division	19	0	2	0	1	0	—		—		22	0
Chelsea	1977–78	First Division	37	1	4	0	1	0	—		—		42	1
Chelsea	1978–79	First Division	40	0	1	0	1	0	—		—		42	0
Chelsea	1979–80	Second Division	39	2	1	0	2	0	—		—		42	2
Chelsea	Total		655	13	64	0	48	0	27	1	1	0	795	14
Brentford	1980–81	Third Division	29	0	3	0	2	0	—		—		34	0
Brentford	1981–82	Third Division	20	0	1	0	2	0	—		—		23	0
Brentford	1982–83	Third Division	9	0	1	0	4	0	—		—		14	0
Brentford	1983–84	Third Division	3	0	—		2	0	—		—		5	0
Brentford	Total		61	0	5	0	10	0	—		0	0	76	0
Career total			716	13	69	0	58	0	27	1	1	0	871	14

== Honours ==
Chelsea Youth

- FA Youth Cup: 1960–61

Chelsea

- Football League Second Division runner-up: 1962–63, 1976–77
- FA Cup: 1969–70; runner-up: 1966–67
- Football League Cup: 1964–65; runner-up: 1971–72
- European Cup Winners' Cup: 1970–71

Records

- Chelsea Overall Appearances: 795
- Chelsea's Most League Appearances: 657
- Chelsea's Most FA Cup Appearances: 64
- Special Recognition Award: 2010–11
