= Miljan Miljanić =

Serbian footballer (1930–2012)

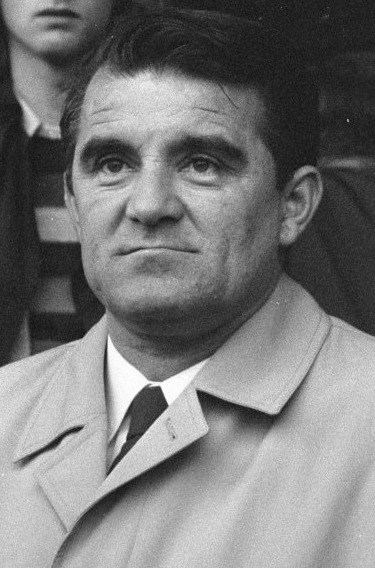
- Miljanić as Red Star Belgrade manager in 1971

Personal information
- Date of birth: 4 May 1930
- Place of birth: Bitola, Kingdom of Yugoslavia
- Date of death: 13 January 2012 (aged 81)
- Place of death: Belgrade, Serbia
- Position: Defender

Youth career
- 1946–1951: Red Star Belgrade

Senior career*
Years	Team	Apps	(Gls)
1951–1952	Red Star Belgrade	1	(0)

Managerial career
- 1965–1966: Yugoslavia
- 1966–1974: Red Star Belgrade
- 1973–1974: Yugoslavia
- 1974–1977: Real Madrid
- 1979–1982: Yugoslavia
- 1982–1983: Valencia
- 1983–1984: Qadsia
- 1984–1986: Al Ain
- 1992: Yugoslavia
Medal record
Men's Football
Representing Yugoslavia
Universiade
Gold medal – first place	1953 Dortmund	Team
- * Club domestic league appearances and goals

Miljan Miljanić (Serbian Cyrillic: Миљан Миљанић; 4 May 1930 – 13 January 2012) was a Yugoslav and Serbian football administrator, coach and player who played as a defender. He was the all-powerful President of the Football Association of Yugoslavia (FSJ) from 1981 to 2001.

Born in Bitola, Vardar Banovina, Kingdom of Yugoslavia, to a family originating from the Banjani clan in the Nikšić municipality in Montenegro, Miljanić spent the first years of his life in what would later become SR Macedonia within SFR Yugoslavia and eventually present day North Macedonia.

During his career, Miljanić coached Red Star Belgrade (won 13 trophies), Real Madrid (won back-to-back La Liga titles, including a League/Cup double in the 1974–75 season), Valencia CF (lasting three quarters of the 1982–83 season until he was dismissed with the team in 17th place in the league), and the Yugoslavia national team, of which he was a head coach in the 1974 and 1982 World Cups.

He also served as president of the Football Association of FR Yugoslavia (FSJ) from 1981 to 2001. After leaving the position in 2001, he was elected honorary president of the association.

In 2002, for his contributions to association football, Miljanić became the recipient of the FIFA Order of Merit — the highest honour awarded by FIFA.

== Early life ==
Miljanić was born in 1930 in Bitola, a town his geometer father Akim Miljanić had moved the family to two years earlier in 1928 after finding employment there. Previously, in 1922, Akim had arrived to Belgrade from Montenegro's Banjani region in order to study at the newly opened Geodesy School. The family also consisted of mother Zorka and sisters Mira and Nada.

In 1941, with Nazi Germany invading, conquering, and dismembering Kingdom of Yugoslavia into territories administered by newly established local collaborationist regimes or neighbouring Axis powers states, the Miljanićs were forced into fleeing Bitola by the occupying Bulgarian force that had been handed the territory of Vardar Banovina by the Nazis. The fleeing family first settled in the town of Jagodina followed by relocating to Kragujevac, a city reeling from the October 1941 massacre of more than 2,700 civilians committed by the Wehrmacht force.

In 1944, in Kragujevac, 14-year-old Miljanić reportedly joined the Yugoslav Partisans.

Following the end of World War II, the family moved to Belgrade in 1946.

== Coaching career ==
=== Yugoslavia national team ===
Miljanić had three stints as the head coach of the Yugoslavia national team, 1965–66, 1973–74 and 1979–82. He coached the national team at the 1974 FIFA World Cup and the 1982 FIFA World Cup.

By 1992, the team was coached by Bosnian Ivica Osim, during whose tenure Yugoslavia had qualified to UEFA Euro 1992. However, with his family under the siege of Sarajevo, Osim resigned on 23 May. To replace him, the Yugoslav federation called a duo of Miljanić and Ivan Čabrinović, a Serb married with a Muslim woman. One day later, it was announced the squad list. Under Miljanić and Čabrinović, Yugoslavia played just one unofficial friendly against the club Fiorentina, in Florence, for a minor attendance and under huge protests, on 28 May. It was known by that day the rumor that Yugoslavia would be banned of the tournament due to Yugoslav wars, to which Miljanić, disgusted with increasingly questions about his players origins rather than their efficiency, reacted with wet eyes: "are we not welcomed? What? They do not want us anymore?". On 31 May, with the squad already in Sweden, the ban was confirmed, just ten days before the opening match.

=== Real Madrid ===
Miljanić's arrival to Real during the summer 1974 transfer window came on the heels of a turbulent season that saw the famous club make a coaching change after almost 14 seasons of Miguel Muñoz at the helm. The longtime coach's mid-season replacement Luis Molowny didn't fare well, losing 5–0 at home in El Clásico to the Johan Cruijff-led Barcelona in February 1974 and further cementing the club's league table placing away from the European spots. Right away, the club's iconic president Santiago Bernabéu Yeste felt it was time for major changes, initiating yet another approach to the Red Star Belgrade head coach Miljanić who had simultaneously been heading the Yugoslavia national team head coaching commission while awaiting the 1974 FIFA World Cup in West Germany. The Serb had reportedly been on Real's radar for a few years already, consistently rejecting their prior overtures. This time, within weeks, by March 1974, Miljanić committed to a two-year contract with Real Madrid effective summer 1974 following the World Cup, an arrangement reportedly set to see him receive US$150,000 in salary compensation (US$900,000 in 2022) over the agreed period. Other coaches Bernabéu reportedly considered for the job at this time included Inter Milan's head coach Helenio Herrera. The news of Yugoslavia head coaching commission leader Miljanić's signature with Real only a few months before World Cup was not received particularly well at home with certain press outlets calling for his sacking from the national team coaching commission. He would be allowed to stay, however, and lead the national team in West Germany.

Molowny completed the ongoing league season as Real's head coach knowing he'll be gone at the end of it no matter the outcome. In the end, he led the team to the eight spot in the league while winning the Copa del Generalísimo emphatically 4–0 against biggest rivals FC Barcelona. Miljanić, for his part, led Yugoslavia at the 1974 FIFA World Cup, managing to make it out of the first round group before losing each of the three matches in the next round group.

On 5 July 1974, three days after ending his World Cup participation in West Germany with a loss against Sweden, Miljanić was presented as Real Madrid's new head coach. The Serb's only condition was reportedly that he be allowed to bring along compatriot Srećko "Felix" Radišić as fitness coach. Radišić thus became the first fitness coach in club's history. Others in Miljanić's coaching staff were the club-assigned goalkeeping coach Juan Santisteban and assistant coach Antonio Ruiz.

==== 1974–75 season: league-cup double ====
Incoming Miljanić initiated a number of innovative changes in the training methods at Real. Insisting on optimal physical and tactical preparation, he increased the number of daily training sessions from one to three—the first two (morning and noon) focusing on fitness and the late afternoon one with the ball—thus causing an outrage within the club initially. In addition to enhanced fitness training with fitness coach Radišić involving medicine balls, weights as well as speed and endurance tests, Miljanić further insisted on Real players not having more than two touches on the ball, having them perfect the long pass game with the entire team functioning as a precise mechanism. He also moved Pirri from his midfield role into the sweeper defensive role while the offensive movement usually converged with crosses for target forwards Santillana and new signing from Espanyol Roberto Martínez. Furthermore, at Miljanić's disposal were goalkeeper Miguel Ángel, defensive midfielder Vicente del Bosque, veteran right winger Amancio Amaro, West German midfielder Günter Netzer, newly signed defenceman from Bayern Paul Breitner, and young defender from the youth system José Antonio Camacho.

Despite facing fan criticism over unattractive play, Real won the league and cup double in his first season as coach.

In the Cup Winners' Cup, they got eliminated at the quarterfinal stage on penalties by Miljanić's former team Red Star Belgrade. The tie took place over two legs in March 1975, and Miljanić somewhat controversially decided not to travel to Belgrade for the return leg because he reportedly couldn't bear to lead the team against his former side, saying: "I can not betray my heart". Others speculated that contentious relations between SFR Yugoslavia and the Spanish State under the regime of Francisco Franco played a role in Miljanić's decision. Instead, the coach invited journalists to watch the game with him on television in Madrid. Going into the return leg Real had a 2–0 first leg lead, however, led by Antonio Ruiz who stepped in for Miljanić that night, los merenegues lost 2–0 in Belgrade and then got eliminated in the penalty shootout.

As his two-year contract at Real was set to expire, Miljanić began to be courted by Arsenal that was looking for a replacement for their manager Bertie Mee who had put the club on notice about resigning at the end of the current season. After visiting London on 20 April 1976 and receiving a reportedly lucrative offer to manage the club starting from the 1976–77 season, Miljanić decided not to sign with Arsenal and eventually re-signed with Real.

After ending the 1976–77 season without silverware, Miljanić started his fourth campaign as Real's coach in September 1977. However, after losing the opening match of the league season to Salamanca 2–1, Miljanić resigned his post.

Miljanić took a full year away from coaching after resigning from Real. Among the offers he considered during the period was Chelsea's whose chairman Brian Mears courted the Yugoslav heavily, even flying him in to spend two weeks with the club in mid October 1978 with a view of assessing the club's potential before deciding whether to stay at Stamford Bridge in some permanent capacity. The activities Miljanić partook in while in London and Stamford Bridge included watching Chelsea come back from 3–0 down to win 4–3 in the league versus Bolton Wanderers. Ultimately, not keen on fighting for survival in the English League Top Division, he opted not to join the club.

Within weeks of returning from London, Miljanić was appointed manager of Yugoslavia's national team.

== Personal life ==
Miljanić was married to Olivera "Vera" Reljić with whom he had two children: son Miloš Miljanić (former footballer and current manager of Alianza F.C. of El Salvador) and daughter Zorka.

He died on 13 January 2012, aged 81, in Belgrade, Serbia after suffering from Alzheimer's disease for several years. Mourning the loss of the club's former great, on 14 January, Real Madrid side coached by José Mourinho played their away league match at Real Mallorca with Madrid players wearing black armbands.

== Honours ==
=== Manager ===
Red Star Belgrade

- Yugoslav First League: 1967–68, 1968–69, 1969–70, 1972–73
- Yugoslav Cup: 1967–68, 1969–70, 1970–71
- Yugoslav Super Cup: 1969, 1971
- Yugoslav League Cup: 1972-73
- Yugoslav Summer Champions League: 1971, 1973
- Mitropa Cup: 1967–68

Real Madrid

- La Liga: 1974–75, 1975–76
- Copa del Generalísimo: 1974–75

=== Individual ===
- FIFA Order of Merit: 2002
- Don Balón Award: 1976
