= 1965–66 Chelsea F.C. season =

English football club season

Chelsea
1965–66 season
- Chairman: Joe Mears
- Manager: Tommy Docherty
- First Division: 5th
- FA Cup: Semi-finals
- Football League Cup: DNE
- Inter-Cities Fairs Cup: Semi-finals
- Top goalscorer: League: George Graham (17); All: George Graham, Bobby Tambling (23)
- Highest home attendance: 60,269 vs Manchester United (12 March 1966)
- Lowest home attendance: 10,024 vs Blackburn Rovers (4 May 1966)
Home colours	Away colours	Third colours

The 1965–66 season was Chelsea Football Club's 52nd of competitive football, and their 39th in the English top flight.

== Results ==
=== First Division ===
Date	Opponent	Venue	Result	Attendance	Scorers
21 August 1965	Burnley	H	1–1	34,067	Venables
25 August 1965	Stoke City	A	2–2	28,549	Venables (pen), Tambling
28 August 1965	Fulham	A	3–0	34,027	Murray, Graham, Bridges
1 September 1965	Stoke City	H	1–2	25,071	Hollins
4 September 1965	Arsenal	A	3–1	45,456	Graham, Bridges, Fascione
11 September 1965	Everton	H	3–1	29,816	Graham, Bridges, Venables
15 September 1965	Sheffield Wednesday	H	1–1	26,183	Venables
18 September 1965	Manchester United	A	1–4	37,917	Venables
25 September 1965	Newcastle United	H	1–1	30,856	Graham
2 October 1965	West Bromwich Albion	A	2–1	23,049	Graham, Bridges
9 October 1965	Blackpool	H	0–1	28,022	
16 October 1965	Blackburn Rovers	A	1–0	16,167	Graham
23 October 1965	Leicester City	H	0–2	30,400	
30 October 1965	Sheffield United	A	2–1	20,795	Graham, Osgood
6 November 1965	Leeds United	H	1–0	39,373	Hollins
13 November 1965	West Ham United	A	1–2	31,551	Tambling
27 November 1965	Aston Villa	A	4–2	16,355	Graham, Osgood, Tambling (2)
4 December 1965	Liverpool	H	0–1	36,839	
11 December 1965	Tottenham Hotspur	A	2–4	42,299	Bridges, Graham
27 December 1965	Northampton Town	A	3–2	23,325	Graham, Tambling (2)
28 December 1965	Northampton Town	H	1–0	17,635	Bridges
1 January 1966	Blackpool	A	2–1	14,065	Graham, Tambling
8 January 1966	Tottenham Hotspur	H	2–1	48,529	Graham, Osgood
29 January 1966	Burnley	A	2–1	23,825	Osgood (2)
5 February 1966	Fulham	H	2–1	34,247	Osgood, Tambling
19 February 1966	Arsenal	H	0–0	48,641	
22 February 1966	Sunderland	H	3–2	20,828	Bridges, Graham, Osgood
26 February 1966	Everton	A	1–2	51,298	Bridges
12 March 1966	Manchester United	H	2–0	60,269	Graham, Tambling
19 March 1966	Newcastle United	A	1–0	35,100	Venables
21 March 1966	Leicester City	A	1–1	25,363	Bridges
4 April 1966	Leeds United	A	0–2	37,786	
9 April 1966	West Ham United	H	6–2	35,958	Graham (2), Venables (pen), Tambling (2), R. Harris
11 April 1966	Nottingham Forest	H	1–0	39,380	Tambling
12 April 1966	Nottingham Forest	A	2–1	29,569	Tambling (2)
16 April 1966	Sunderland	A	0–2	32,880	
25 April 1966	West Bromwich Albion	H	2–3	22,804	Venables (pen), Tambling
30 April 1966	Liverpool	A	1–2	53,754	Murray
2 May 1966	Sheffield Wednesday	A	1–1	26,777	R. Harris
4 May 1966	Blackburn Rovers	H	1–0	10,024	Kirkup
7 May 1966	Sheffield United	H	2–0	23,072	Graham, Tambling
16 May 1966	Aston Villa	H	0–2	16,232	

Pos	Team	Pld	W	D	L	GF	GA	GAv	Pts	Qualification or relegation
3	Burnley	42	24	7	11	79	47	1.681	55	Qualification for the Inter-Cities Fairs Cup first round
4	Manchester United	42	18	15	9	84	59	1.424	51	
5	Chelsea	42	22	7	13	65	53	1.226	51	
6	West Bromwich Albion	42	19	12	11	91	69	1.319	50	Qualification for the Inter-Cities Fairs Cup second round
7	Leicester City	42	21	7	14	80	65	1.231	49	

Source: World Football
Rules for classification: 1) Points; 2) Goal average; 3) Goals scored

=== FA Cup ===
Date	Round	Opponent	Venue	Result	Attendance	Scorers
22 January 1965	3	Liverpool	A	2–1	54,097	Osgood, Tambling
12 February 1965	4	Leeds United	H	1–0	57,847	Tambling
5 March 1965	5	Shrewsbury Town	H	3–2	51,144	Bridges (2), Graham
26 March 1965	QF	Hull City	H	2–2	46,924	Graham, Tambling
31 March 1965	QF (R)	Hull City	A	3–1	45,328	Graham, Tambling (2)
23 April 1965	SF	Sheffield Wednesday	N	0–2	61,321	

=== Fairs Cup ===
Date	Round	Opponent	Venue	Result	Attendance	Scorers
22 September 1965	1	Roma	H	4–1	32,753	Graham, Venables (3)
6 October 1965	1	Roma	A	0–0	40,000	
7 November 1965	2	Wiener Sport-Club	A	0–1	4,000	
1 December 1965	2	Wiener Sport-Club	H	2–0	28,254	Murray, Osgood
9 February 1966	3	AC Milan	A	1–2	11,411	Graham
16 February 1966	3	AC Milan	H	2–1	59,541	Graham, Osgood
2 March 1966	3 (R)	AC Milan	A	1–1	30,620	Bridges
2 March 1966		AC Milan	Chelsea won on coin toss			
15 March 1966	QF	1860 München	A	2–2	11,000	Tambling (2)
29 March 1966	QF	1860 München	H	1–0	42,224	Osgood
27 April 1966	SF	Barcelona	A	0–2	70,000	
11 May 1966	SF	Barcelona	H	2–0	40,073	Reina (o.g.), Gallego (o.g.)
25 May 1966	SF (R)	Barcelona	A	0–5	40,000	
