= 1961–62 Chelsea F.C. season =

English football club season

Chelsea
1961–62 season
- Chairman: Joe Mears
- Manager: Ted Drake (until November); Tommy Docherty
- Stadium: Stamford Bridge
- First Division: 22nd
- FA Cup: Third round
- Top goalscorer: League: Bobby Tambling (20); All: Bobby Tambling (22)
- Highest home attendance: 42,248 vs Manchester United (30 August 1961)
- Lowest home attendance: 12,404 vs Bolton Wanderers (11 November 1961)
- Average home league attendance: 27,015
- Biggest win: 6–1 v Sheffield United (9 September 1961)
- Biggest defeat: 0–4 (three matches)
Home colours	Away colours

The 1961–62 season was Chelsea Football Club's forty-eighth competitive season. Following a poor start to the season, manager Ted Drake was dismissed in September 1961 and replaced by player-coach Tommy Docherty. Nevertheless, the club were relegated at the season of the season, ending a 32-year spell in the top-flight.

== Table ==
Pos	Team	Pld	W	D	L	GF	GA	GAv	Pts	Qualification or relegation
18	Wolverhampton Wanderers	42	13	10	19	73	86	0.849	36	
19	Nottingham Forest	42	13	10	19	63	79	0.797	36	
20	Fulham	42	13	7	22	66	74	0.892	33	
21	Cardiff City (R)	42	9	14	19	50	81	0.617	32	Relegation to the Second Division
22	Chelsea (R)	42	9	10	23	63	94	0.670	28	Relegation to the Second Division

Source: World Football
Rules for classification: 1) Points; 2) Goal average; 3) Goals scored
(R) Relegated
