= Ken Shellito =

English footballer (1940–2018)

Personal information
- Date of birth: 18 April 1940
- Place of birth: East Ham, London, England
- Date of death: 31 October 2018 (aged 78)
- Place of death: Inanam, Kota Kinabalu, Sabah, Malaysia
- Position: Full-back

Youth career
- 1957–1959: Chelsea

Senior career*
Years	Team	Apps	(Gls)
1959–1965	Chelsea	123	(2)

International career
1963	England	1	(0)

Managerial career
- 1977–1978: Chelsea
- 1985: Cambridge United
- 1994: Kuala Lumpur FA
- 1995: Perak FA
- 1998: Sabah FA
- * Club domestic league appearances and goals

Kenneth John Shellito (18 April 1940 – 31 October 2018) was an English football player and manager who played for Chelsea from 1959 to 1965, and subsequently managed the club from 1977 to 1978. He worked in a coaching role for the Asian Football Confederation, based in Kuala Lumpur, before spending his later life in Inanam of Sabah as a permanent resident.

== Professional career ==
=== Chelsea ===
Shellito spent his entire playing career at Chelsea, signing for the club from Chelsea Juniors at the age of 17 and making his professional debut two years later against Nottingham Forest. He featured in Tommy Docherty's re-built Chelsea side of the early 1960s as an attacking full-back, helping the club win promotion from the Second Division in 1962–63. However, as the side began to challenge for honours Shellito suffered a serious knee injury and despite several attempted comebacks, was forced to retire prematurely.

== International career ==
Shellito made one appearance for England, against Czechoslovakia in 1963.

== Managerial career ==
=== Chelsea ===
Upon his retirement, Shellito joined the Chelsea coaching staff and took charge of the club's youth academy in 1968. In the summer of 1977, he was appointed manager of Chelsea, succeeding his former partner at full-back, Eddie McCreadie. He managed to keep Chelsea in the First Division in 1977–78, but the highlight of his tenure was a shock 4–2 win over reigning European champions Liverpool in the FA Cup. He left the club less than a year later, with the side at the bottom of the First Division and facing relegation.

=== Cambridge United ===
He was later manager of Cambridge United, before becoming a coach in Malaysia.

== Personal life ==
Shellito was married to a Sabahan native, Jeany Dison. They had three children, two daughters and one son. One of the daughters & son is through his previous marriage in England.

== Illness and death ==
In late 2018, Shellito was hospitalised at the Queen Elizabeth Hospital, Kota Kinabalu due to lung infection and kidney complications. He was treated by Dr Suren and Dr Shadtha during the hospital stay. Later Shellito was discharged on 30 October to die at his home in Kampung Minintod, Inanam on 31 October.
