= Bobby Tambling =

English footballer (1941–2026)

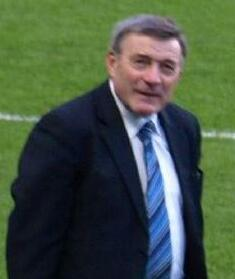
- Tambling in 2009

Personal information
- Full name: Robert Victor Tambling
- Date of birth: 18 September 1941
- Place of birth: Storrington, England
- Date of death: 3 June 2026 (aged 84)
- Place of death: Cork, Ireland
- Position: Striker

Youth career
- 1957–1959: Chelsea

Senior career*
Years	Team	Apps	(Gls)
1959–1970	Chelsea	302	(164)
1970–1973	Crystal Palace	68	(12)
1973–1977	Cork Celtic	82	(39)
1977–1978	Waterford	13	(8)
1978–1979	Shamrock Rovers	5	(0)
1978–1979	Cork Alberts	15	(2)
Total		479	(263)

International career
1962–1966	England	3	(1)
1977–1978	League of Ireland XI	2	(?)

Managerial career
- 1974–1977: Cork Celtic
- 1984: Cork City
- 1985–2012: Crosshaven
- * Club domestic league appearances and goals

Robert Victor Tambling (18 September 1941 – 3 June 2026) was an English professional footballer, who played as a forward, most notably for Chelsea, Crystal Palace and England. He was Chelsea's all-time top scorer for 47 years, with 202 goals in all competitions, until Frank Lampard surpassed this total on 11 May 2013. Tambling remains Chelsea's all-time top scorer in league competition with 164 goals. After enjoying a successful career in the Football League during the 1960s and early 1970s, Tambling moved to Ireland. He subsequently played for several clubs in the League of Ireland and also represented the League of Ireland XI. After retiring as a player he continued to live in Ireland, residing in Crosshaven, County Cork.

== Club career ==
=== Chelsea ===
A talented schoolboy footballer who played for England schoolboys, his signature as a professional player was sought out by several teams including Reading, Wolverhampton Wanderers and the club he supported as a boy, Blackpool. Having met scout Jimmy Thompson and manager Ted Drake Tambling joined Chelsea as a fifteen-year-old in 1957. He made his debut, aged seventeen in 1959 scoring in a 3–2 win against West Ham United. Two years later, following the transfer of Jimmy Greaves to AC Milan, he became Chelsea's main striker and was their leading goal scorer for five seasons in the 1960s. Forming a partnership with Barry Bridges, Tambling was made club captain in 1962 by manager Tommy Docherty after Chelsea's relegation to the Second Division. With Docherty adding new players Terry Venables and Peter Bonetti Chelsea made an immediate return to the top flight with Tambling as their top scorer as he was in their first season back in the top division.

In 1965, he was a member of the team which won the 1965 Football League Cup final. Played over two legs, Tambling scored the first goal in the first leg, a 3–2 defeat of Leicester City. Tambling was also a member of the Chelsea side which lost the 1967 FA Cup Final. Although he scored for Chelsea his 85th-minute goal was little more than a consolation as Tottenham Hotspur, with former Chelsea players Greaves and Venables, won 2–1. Tambling holds the record for the highest number of goals scored for Chelsea in a league game. He scored five goals in a 6–2 away win at Aston Villa on 17 September 1966 before being substituted by Allan Harris. His record 202 goals for Chelsea came in only 370 games. By the end of the decade Tambling had lost his place in the starting line-up to younger strikers like Peter Osgood and Ian Hutchinson. He played only seven games for Chelsea in the 1969–70 season and was not selected for the 1970 FA Cup final between Chelsea and Leeds United. At the end of the season he transferred to Crystal Palace.

In 2004, Tambling had a suite named after him at Stamford Bridge, in honour of his status at Chelsea. He was named in the club's greatest ever XI, selected to mark the club's centenary. Despite suffering from Martorell's ulcer, a leg condition which saw him admitted to hospital for four months in 2013, he was able to travel from his home in Ireland to be the special guest of Chelsea at their home game against Swansea City on 28 April 2013, where he made "an emotional half-time lap of honour" on a wheelchair.

=== Crystal Palace ===
Tambling played three games for Crystal Palace during a one-month loan in January 1970, without scoring, but then completed a £40,000 transfer in summer 1970 along with Alan Birchenall who was valued at £100,000. He was not selected for the 1970 FA Cup Final between Chelsea and Leeds United as a result of several injuries. The following two seasons saw him play 66 games scoring seventeen goals however seasons 1972–73 and 1973–74 saw only seven games and no goals. The highlight of his time with Palace was his two goals in the San Siro Stadium as Palace beat Inter Milan 2–1 in the 1971 Anglo-Italian Cup.

=== Ireland ===
In 1973 Tambling quit Crystal Palace and moved to Ireland. Tambling was a committed Jehovah's Witness and volunteered for evangelical duty in County Cork. He subsequently played for several clubs in the League of Ireland. On the advice of his former Chelsea teammate Paddy Mulligan, he first signed for Cork Celtic. In 1974, playing alongside Alfie Hale, Tambling scored seven goals as he helped Celtic win only their only league title. He also played and scored in the 1974–75 European Cup and between 1974 and 1977 also served Celtic as player manager. He spent the 1977–78 season at Waterford United, playing alongside Peter Thomas and Johnny Matthews, before switching to Shamrock Rovers for the 1978–79 season. He finished his playing career with Cork Alberts. Tambling also briefly served as manager of Cork City during the 1984–85 season. In more recent times Tambling continued to live in Crosshaven where he also managed the local Munster Senior League side.

== International career ==
=== England ===
Between 1962 and 1966 Tambling made three international appearances for England. He had previously represented England at Under 23 level. He made his full England debut on 21 November 1962 in a 4–0 win against Wales in the British Home Championship. On 27 February 1963, he scored his only international goal in a European Nations' Cup qualifier which England lost 5–2 to France at Parc de Princes. Tambling had to wait more than three years for his next game, on 4 May 1966, a 2–0 friendly win against Yugoslavia. It was his last international appearance for England. Tambling won all three of his England caps while a Chelsea player.

=== League of Ireland XI ===
Tambling also played for the League of Ireland XI on at least two occasions. On 21 September 1977 at Dalymount Park he featured against a Republic of Ireland team that included Johnny Giles, Liam Brady, Steve Heighway and Don Givens. The league selection lost 2–1. On 19 April 1978 Tambling also played against Argentina at the Estadio Alberto J. Armando, in a warm up game as part of their preparations for hosting the 1978 FIFA World Cup. His teammates included Johnny Giles, Ray Treacy, Eamonn Gregg and Synan Braddish. The starting eleven for Argentina included nine players who later played in the 1978 FIFA World Cup Final. Argentina won this game 3–1. On these two occasions Tambling was a Waterford United player.

== Death ==
Tambling died after a long illness at a care home in Montenotte, Cork, on 3 June 2026. He was 84.

== Career statistics ==
Appearances and goals by club, season and competition
Club	Season	League			FA Cup		League Cup		Europe		Total	
Club	Season	Division	Apps	Goals	Apps	Goals	Apps	Goals	Apps	Goals	Apps	Goals
Chelsea	1958–59	First Division	1	1	–		–		–		1	1
Chelsea	1959–60	First Division	4	1	–		–		–		4	1
Chelsea	1960–61	First Division	24	9	1	0	3	3	–		28	12
Chelsea	1961–62	First Division	34	20	1	2	–		–		35	22
Chelsea	1962–63	Second Division	40	35	4	2	–		–		44	37
Chelsea	1963–64	First Division	37	17	2	2	1	0	–		38	19
Chelsea	1964–65	First Division	33	15	5	4	7	6	–		45	25
Chelsea	1965–66	First Division	26	16	6	5	–		10 (Note: Appearances in Inter-Cities Fairs Cup)	2	42	23
Chelsea	1966–67	First Division	36	21	7	6	3	1	–		46	28
Chelsea	1967–68	First Division	24	12	5	3	1	0	–		30	15
Chelsea	1968–69	First Division	38	17	5	1	3	0	4	1	50	19
Chelsea	1969–70	First Division	7	0	–		–		–		7	0
Total			302	164	36	25	18	10	14	3	370	202

== Honours ==
Chelsea

- Football League Cup: 1964–65
- FA Cup runner-up: 1966–67

Cork Celtic

- League of Ireland: 1973–74
