= 1977–78 Chelsea F.C. season =

English football club season

Chelsea
1977–78 season
- Chairman: Brian Mears
- Manager: Ken Shellito
- Stadium: Stamford Bridge
- First Division: 16th
- FA Cup: Fifth round
- League Cup: Second round
- Top goalscorer: League: Tommy Langley (11); All: Tommy Langley (13)
- Highest home attendance: 44,093 vs West Ham United (27 December 1977)
- Lowest home attendance: 18,008 vs Birmingham City (24 August 1977)
- Average home league attendance: 28,322
- Biggest win: 6–2 v Burnley (31 January 1978)
- Biggest defeat: 0–6 v Everton (29 April 1978)
Home colours	Away colours

The 1977–78 season was Chelsea Football Club's sixty-fourth competitive season.

== Table ==
Pos	Team	Pld	W	D	L	GF	GA	GD	Pts	Qualification or relegation
14	Middlesbrough	42	12	15	15	42	54	−12	39	
15	Wolverhampton Wanderers	42	12	12	18	51	64	−13	36	
16	Chelsea	42	11	14	17	46	69	−23	36	
17	Bristol City	42	11	13	18	49	53	−4	35	
18	Ipswich Town	42	11	13	18	47	61	−14	35	Qualification for the European Cup Winners' Cup first round (Note: Ipswich Town qualified for the European Cup Winners' Cup as the 1977–78 FA Cup winners.)

Source: World Football
Rules for classification: 1) Points; 2) Goal difference; 3) Goals scored
