= 1975–76 Chelsea F.C. season =

English football club season

Chelsea
1975–76 season
- Chairman: Brian Mears
- Manager: Eddie McCreadie
- Stadium: Stamford Bridge
- Second Division: 11th
- FA Cup: Fifth round
- League Cup: Second round
- Top goalscorer: League: Ray Wilkins (11); All: Ray Wilkins (12)
- Highest home attendance: 54,407 vs Crystal Palace F.A.Cup (14 February 1976)
- Lowest home attendance: 10,254 vs Hull City (18 February 1976)
- Average home league attendance: 18,881
- Biggest win: 3–1 (four matches)
- Biggest defeat: 1–4 v Southampton (11 October 1975)
Home colours	Away colours

The 1975–76 season was Chelsea Football Club's sixty-second competitive season.

== Table ==
Pos	Team	Pld	W	D	L	GF	GA	GAv	Pts
9	Charlton Athletic	42	15	12	15	61	72	0.847	42
10	Blackpool	42	14	14	14	40	49	0.816	42
11	Chelsea	42	12	16	14	53	54	0.981	40
12	Fulham	42	13	14	15	45	47	0.957	40
13	Orient	42	13	14	15	37	39	0.949	40

Rules for classification: 1) Points; 2) Goal average; 3) Goals scored
