= 1976–77 Chelsea F.C. season =

English football club season

Chelsea
1976–77 season
- Chairman: Brian Mears
- Manager: Eddie McCreadie
- Stadium: Stamford Bridge
- Second Division: 2nd
- FA Cup: Third round
- League Cup: Fourth round
- Top goalscorer: League: Steve Finnieston (24); All: Steve Finnieston (26)
- Highest home attendance: 55,003 vs Fulham (27 December 1976)
- Lowest home attendance: 16,883 vs Sheffield United (1 September 1976)
- Average home league attendance: 30,552
- Biggest win: 5–1 v Hereford United (1 January 1977)
- Biggest defeat: 0–4 v (two matches)
Home colours	Away colours

The 1976–77 season was Chelsea Football Club's sixty-third competitive season.

== Table ==
Pos	Team	Pld	W	D	L	GF	GA	GD	Pts	Qualification or relegation
1	Wolverhampton Wanderers (C, P)	42	22	13	7	84	45	+39	57	Promotion to the First Division
2	Chelsea (P)	42	21	13	8	73	53	+20	55	Promotion to the First Division
3	Nottingham Forest (P)	42	21	10	11	77	43	+34	52	Promotion to the First Division
4	Bolton Wanderers	42	20	11	11	75	54	+21	51	
5	Blackpool	42	17	17	8	58	42	+16	51	

Rules for classification: 1) Points; 2) Goal difference; 3) Goals scored
(C) Champions; (P) Promoted
