= 1974–75 Chelsea F.C. season =

English football club season

Chelsea
1974–75 season
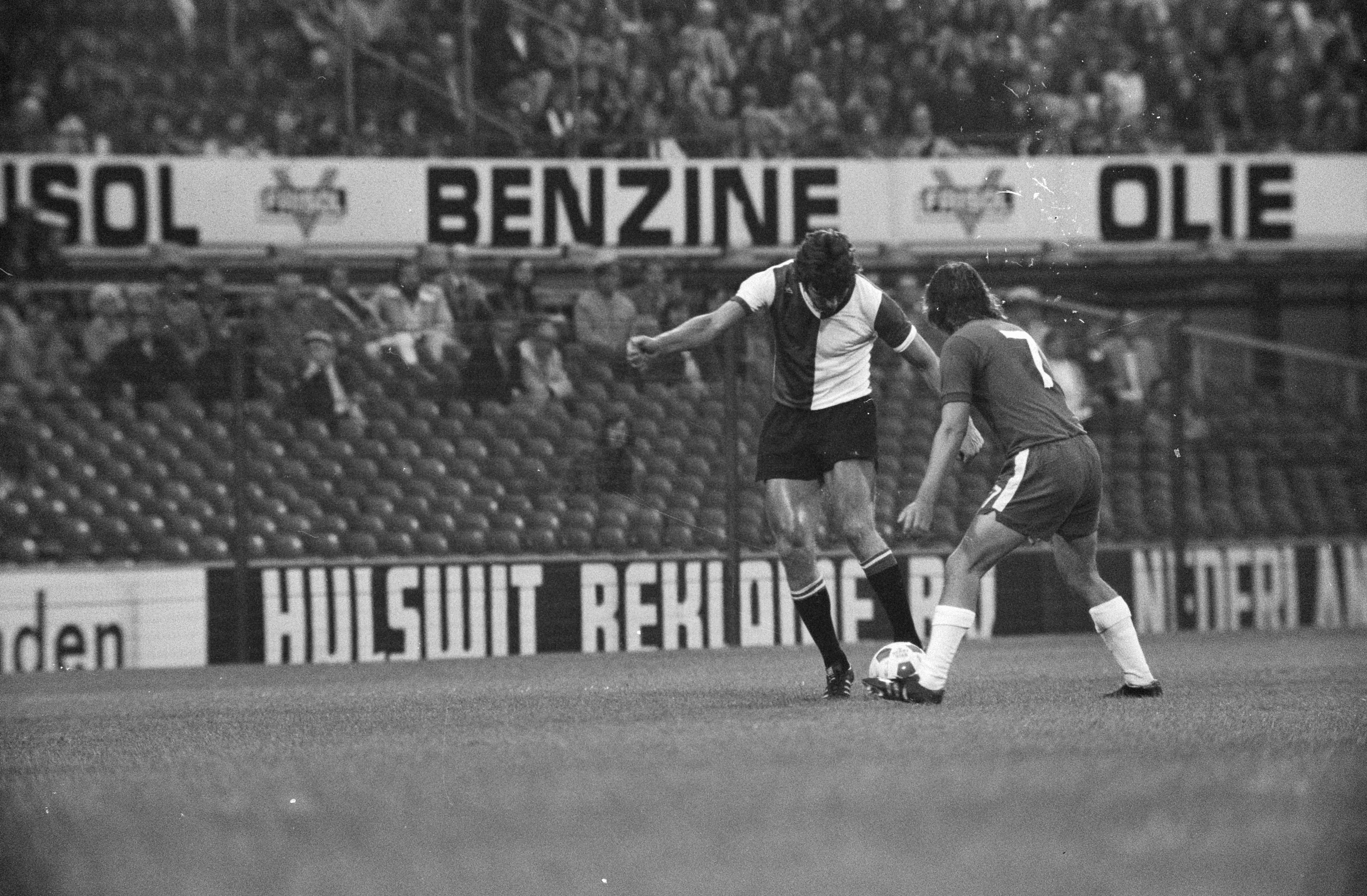
- Chelsea in a friendly match against Feyenoord Rotterdam
- Chairman: Brian Mears
- Manager: Dave Sexton (until October); Ron Suart (until April 1975); Eddie McCreadie
- Stadium: Stamford Bridge
- First Division: 21st
- FA Cup: Fourth round
- League Cup: Third round
- Top goalscorer: League: Ian Hutchinson (7); All: Ian Hutchinson (9)
- Highest home attendance: 39,461 vs Liverpool (31 August 1974)
- Lowest home attendance: 13,322 vs Newport County (11 September 1974)
- Average home league attendance: 27,380
- Biggest win: 4–2 v Newport County (11 September 1974)
- Biggest defeat: 1–7 v Wolverhampton Wanderers (15 March 1975)
Home colours	Away colours

The 1974–75 season was Chelsea Football Club's sixty-first competitive season. Following a poor start to the season, manager Dave Sexton was sacked in October 1974 and replaced by his assistant Ron Suart. Suart in turn was succeeded by former Chelsea left-back Eddie McCreadie in April 1975. The club were relegated at the end of the season, bringing to an end a 12-year spell in the top-flight.

== Table ==
Pos	Team	Pld	W	D	L	GF	GA	GAv	Pts	Qualification or relegation
18	Leicester City	42	12	12	18	46	60	0.767	36	
19	Tottenham Hotspur	42	13	8	21	52	63	0.825	34	
20	Luton Town (R)	42	11	11	20	47	65	0.723	33	Relegation to the Second Division
21	Chelsea (R)	42	9	15	18	42	72	0.583	33	Relegation to the Second Division
22	Carlisle United (R)	42	12	5	25	43	59	0.729	29	Relegation to the Second Division

Source: World Football
Rules for classification: 1) Points; 2) Goal average; 3) Goals scored
(R) Relegated
