= 1962–63 Chelsea F.C. season =

English football club season

Chelsea
1962–63 season
- Chairman: Joe Mears
- Manager: Tommy Docherty
- Stadium: Stamford Bridge
- Second Division: 2nd
- FA Cup: Fifth round
- Top goalscorer: League: Bobby Tambling (35); All: Bobby Tambling (37)
- Highest home attendance: 54,558 vs Portsmouth (21 May 1963)
- Lowest home attendance: 18,377 vs Scunthorpe United (22 August 1962)
- Average home league attendance: 29,376
- Biggest win: 7–0 v Portsmouth (21 May 1963)
- Biggest defeat: 1–4 v Norwich City (6 Apr 1963)
Home colours	Away colours

The 1962–63 season was Chelsea Football Club's forty-ninth competitive season. In a season heavily impacted by the "big freeze" of 1963, Chelsea were promoted back to the First Division as Second Division runners-up.

== Table ==
Pos	Team	Pld	W	D	L	GF	GA	GAv	Pts	Qualification or relegation
1	Stoke City (C, P)	42	20	13	9	73	50	1.460	53	Promotion to the First Division
2	Chelsea (P)	42	24	4	14	81	42	1.929	52	Promotion to the First Division
3	Sunderland	42	20	12	10	84	55	1.527	52	
4	Middlesbrough	42	20	9	13	86	85	1.012	49	
5	Leeds United	42	19	10	13	79	53	1.491	48	

Rules for classification: 1) Points; 2) Goal average; 3) Goals scored
(C) Champions; (P) Promoted
