= 1973–74 Chelsea F.C. season =

English football club season

Chelsea
1973–74 season
- Chairman: Brian Mears
- Manager: Dave Sexton
- Stadium: Stamford Bridge
- First Division: 17th
- FA Cup: Third round
- League Cup: Second round
- Top goalscorer: League: Tommy Baldwin (9); All: Tommy Baldwin (9)
- Highest home attendance: 40,768 vs Leeds United (15 December 1973)
- Lowest home attendance: 17,150 vs Stoke City (27 April 1974)
- Average home league attendance: 25,984
- Biggest win: 4–0 v Southampton (24 November 1973)
- Biggest defeat: 0–3 (two matches)
Home colours	Away colours

The 1973–74 season was Chelsea Football Club's sixtieth competitive season.

== Table ==
Pos	Team	Pld	W	D	L	GF	GA	GAv	Pts
15	Newcastle United	42	13	12	17	49	48	1.021	38
16	Coventry City	42	14	10	18	43	54	0.796	38
17	Chelsea	42	12	13	17	56	60	0.933	37
18	West Ham United	42	11	15	16	55	60	0.917	37
19	Birmingham City	42	12	13	17	52	64	0.813	37

Source: World Football
Rules for classification: 1) Points; 2) Goal average; 3) Goals scored
