= 1966–67 Chelsea F.C. season =

English football club season

Chelsea
1966–67 season
- Chairman: Charles Pratt, Jr.
- Manager: Tommy Docherty
- Stadium: Stamford Bridge
- First Division: 9th
- FA Cup: Runners-up
- League Cup: Third round
- Top goalscorer: League: Bobby Tambling (21); All: Bobby Tambling (28)
- Highest home attendance: 55,958 vs Manchester United (5 November 1966)
- Lowest home attendance: 14,262 vs Charlton Athletic (14 September 1966)
- Average home league attendance: 35,567
- Biggest win: 6–2 v Aston Villa (17 September 1966)
- Biggest defeat: 1–6 v Sheffield Wednesday (31 Dec 1966)
Home colours	Away colours

The 1966–67 season was Chelsea Football Club's fifty-third competitive season.

== Summary ==
Chelsea enjoyed a bright start to campaign and were unbeaten in their opening ten league matches. However, results dipped after striker Peter Osgood suffered a broken leg in a League Cup match against Blackpool in October. Osgood was replaced by Tony Hateley, the club's first £100,000 signing, but Hateley struggled for form and the club ultimately finished 9th in the First Division. They also reached the FA Cup Final for the first time since 1915, losing 2–1 to Tottenham Hotspur.

== Table ==
Pos	Team	Pld	W	D	L	GF	GA	GAv	Pts
7	Arsenal	42	16	14	12	58	47	1.234	46
8	Leicester City	42	18	8	16	78	71	1.099	44
9	Chelsea	42	15	14	13	67	62	1.081	44
10	Sheffield United	42	16	10	16	52	59	0.881	42
11	Sheffield Wednesday	42	14	13	15	56	47	1.191	41

Source: World Football
Rules for classification: 1) Points; 2) Goal average; 3) Goals scored
