= Barry Bridges =

English footballer (born 1941)

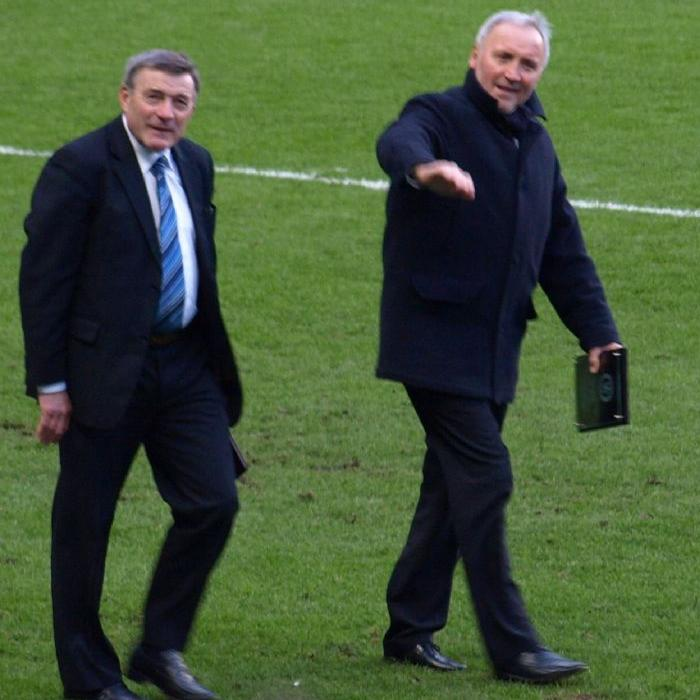
- Bridges (right) with Bobby Tambling

Personal information
- Full name: Barry John Bridges
- Date of birth: 29 April 1941 (age 85)
- Place of birth: Horsford, Norfolk, England
- Position: Forward

Youth career
- 1956–1958: Chelsea

Senior career*
Years	Team	Apps	(Gls)
1958–1966	Chelsea	176	(80)
1966–1968	Birmingham City	83	(36)
1968–1970	Queens Park Rangers	72	(31)
1970–1972	Millwall	77	(27)
1972–1974	Brighton & Hove Albion	66	(14)
1974–1975	Highlands Park		
1976–1978	St Patrick's Athletic		
1978	Sligo Rovers		
Total		474	(188)

International career
1965	England	4	(1)

Managerial career
- 1976–1978: St Patrick's Athletic
- 1978: Sligo Rovers
- 1979: King's Lynn
- Dereham Town
- Horsford United
- * Club domestic league appearances and goals

Barry John Bridges (born 29 April 1941) is an English former professional footballer who played as a forward in the Football League for Chelsea, Birmingham City, Queens Park Rangers, Millwall and Brighton & Hove Albion and was capped four times for England.

== Career ==
Bridges was signed by Chelsea in July 1956 having been spotted whilst playing for Norwich and Norfolk Boys. He turned professional in May 1958, made his debut for the club against West Ham United in February 1959, and scored in a 3–2 victory. He first established himself in the Chelsea side during the 1961–62 season, and though the club were relegated, he nevertheless proved himself a prolific goalscorer as he found the net 20 times that season.

A prolific and versatile forward who could play in the centre or on the wing, Bridges was an important part of manager Tommy Docherty's re-structured Chelsea attack, alongside Bobby Tambling and Terry Venables. He helped the club gain promotion back to the First Division at the first attempt, and then challenge for the major honours. His most successful season with the club was in 1964–65, in which he scored 27 goals in 42 matches, as Chelsea won the League Cup but faltered late-on in their championship and FA Cup challenges.

It was during that season that Bridges, along with several other players, was punished by Docherty for breaking a curfew, after which the manager's relationship with his players deteriorated. Following one more season with Chelsea, Bridges was sold to Second Division club Birmingham City in May 1966 for a club-record £55,000. He continued his impressive scoring record at St Andrew's, netting 47 times in just over 100 games, and helped the side reach the League Cup semi-finals in 1967 and the FA Cup semi-finals a year later. Following the latter defeat, he moved to Queens Park Rangers and then had spells at Millwall, Brighton & Hove Albion and Highlands Park in South Africa. He retired having scored over 200 career goals.

He won four caps for the England national team, all in 1965, and scored his only goal in a 1–1 draw with Yugoslavia. Bridges was in the preliminary squad of forty players selected by Alf Ramsey for the 1966 World Cup, but failed to make the final team.

He later moved into management, first in Ireland as player-manager of St Patrick's Athletic in May 1976 until he resigned in February 1978. While at Richmond Park he brought Gordon Banks into the team for one match.

He was also player-manager at Sligo Rovers. He then returned to his native Norfolk to manage Dereham Town, King's Lynn and Horsford United.

== Career statistics ==
Appearances and goals by club, season and competition
Club	Season	League		National cup		League cup		Europe		Total	
Club	Season	Apps	Goals	Apps	Goals	Apps	Goals	Apps	Goals	Apps	Goals
Chelsea	1958–59	2	1	0	0	0	0	0	0	2	1
Chelsea	1959–60	1	0	0	0	0	0	0	0	1	0
Chelsea	1960–61	2	1	0	0	0	0	0	0	2	1
Chelsea	1961–62	32	19	1	1	0	0	0	0	33	20
Chelsea	1962–63	36	15	2	2	0	0	0	0	38	17
Chelsea	1963–64	33	15	3	0	0	0	0	0	36	15
Chelsea	1964–65	41	20	5	4	5	3	0	0	51	27
Chelsea	1965–66	29	9	6	2	0	0	7	1	42	12
Career total		176	80	17	9	5	3	7	1	205	93

== Honours ==
Chelsea

- Football League Cup: 1964–65
