= 1963–64 Chelsea F.C. season =

English football club season

Chelsea
1963–64 season
- Chairman: Joe Mears
- Manager: Tommy Docherty
- Stadium: Stamford Bridge
- First Division: 5th
- FA Cup: Fourth round
- League Cup: Second round
- Top goalscorer: League: Bobby Tambling (17); All: Bobby Tambling (19)
- Highest home attendance: 70,123 vs Tottenham Hotspur (8 January 1964)
- Lowest home attendance: 19,434 vs West Bromwich Albion (21 March 1964)
- Average home league attendance: 31,303
- Biggest win: 5–1 v Blackpool (26 December 1963)
- Biggest defeat: 1–4 v Wolverhampton Wanderers (28 September 1963)
Home colours	Away colours

The 1963–64 season was Chelsea Football Club's fiftieth competitive season.

== Table ==
Pos	Team	Pld	W	D	L	GF	GA	GAv	Pts	Qualification or relegation
3	Everton	42	21	10	11	84	64	1.313	52	Qualification for the Inter-Cities Fairs Cup first round
4	Tottenham Hotspur	42	22	7	13	97	81	1.198	51	
5	Chelsea	42	20	10	12	72	56	1.286	50	
6	Sheffield Wednesday	42	19	11	12	84	67	1.254	49	
7	Blackburn Rovers	42	18	10	14	89	65	1.369	46	

Source: World Football
Rules for classification: 1) Points; 2) Goal average; 3) Goals scored
