= 1972–73 Chelsea F.C. season =

English football club season

Chelsea
1972–73 season
- Chairman: Brian Mears
- Manager: Dave Sexton
- Stadium: Stamford Bridge
- First Division: 12th
- FA Cup: Quarter-finals
- League Cup: Semi-finals
- Top goalscorer: League: Peter Osgood and Chris Garland (11); All: Peter Osgood (17)
- Highest home attendance: 51,102 vs Leeds United (12 August 1972)
- Lowest home attendance: 18,279 vs Coventry City (23 April 1973)
- Average home league attendance: 29,722
- Biggest win: 4–0 v Leeds United (12 August 1972)
- Biggest defeat: 0–3 v Ipswich Town (26 December 1972)
Home colours	Away colours

The 1972–73 season was Chelsea Football Club's fifty-ninth competitive season.

== Table ==
Pos	Team	Pld	W	D	L	GF	GA	GAv	Pts
10	Birmingham City	42	15	12	15	53	54	0.981	42
11	Manchester City	42	15	11	16	57	60	0.950	41
12	Chelsea	42	13	14	15	49	51	0.961	40
13	Southampton	42	11	18	13	47	52	0.904	40
14	Sheffield United	42	15	10	17	51	59	0.864	40

Source: World Football
Rules for classification: 1) Points; 2) Goal average; 3) Goals scored
