= Martorell's ulcer =

Leg ulcer associated with hypertension

- Other names: Necrotic angiodermatitis, hypertensive leg ulcer (HLU)
- Specialty: Dermatology
- Differential diagnosis: Cutaneous vasculitis, pyoderma gangrenosum, calciphylaxis

Martorell's ulcer, also known as hypertensive leg ulcer or necrotic angiodermatitis, is a painful ulceration of the lower leg associated with diastolic arterial hypertension. It was first identified by the Spanish cardiologist Fernando Martorell in 1945, who referred to the ulcers as 'hypertensive ischaemic ulcers'.

It is characterized by single or multiple small homogeneous, symmetrical lesions, most commonly located on the anterolateral aspect of the lower leg. The pain associated with these lesions is often disproportionate to their size.

The syndrome occurs predominantly in middle-aged women with poorly controlled hypertension in the form of skin ulcers on the anterolateral aspect of the lower legs. The lesions initially appear as small, painful blisters, which may or may not be associated with trauma. The pathophysiology of the Martorell ulcer is assumed to be related to hypertension-induced arteriole changes in the dermis. The pain is often disproportionate, and the symptoms are not relieved by rest or elevation.
