= 1978–79 Chelsea F.C. season =

English football club season

Chelsea
1978–79 season
- Chairman: Brian Mears
- Manager: Ken Shellito; Danny Blanchflower
- Stadium: Stamford Bridge
- First Division: 22nd
- FA Cup: Third round
- League Cup: Second round
- Top goalscorer: League: Tommy Langley (15); All: Tommy Langley (16)
- Highest home attendance: 41,594 vs Tottenham Hotspur (18 November 1978)
- Lowest home attendance: 10,682 vs Derby County (4 April 1979)
- Average home league attendance: 23,816
- Biggest win: 4–3 v Bolton Wanderers (14 October 1978)
- Biggest defeat: 0–6 v Nottingham Forest (28 March 1979)
Home colours	Away colours

The 1978–79 season was Chelsea Football Club's sixty-fifth competitive season.

== Table ==
Pos	Team	Pld	W	D	L	GF	GA	GD	Pts	Qualification or relegation
18	Wolverhampton Wanderers	42	13	8	21	44	68	−24	34	
19	Derby County	42	10	11	21	44	71	−27	31	
20	Queens Park Rangers (R)	42	6	13	23	45	73	−28	25	Relegation to the Second Division
21	Birmingham City (R)	42	6	10	26	37	64	−27	22	Relegation to the Second Division
22	Chelsea (R)	42	5	10	27	44	92	−48	20	Relegation to the Second Division

Source: World Football
Rules for classification: 1) Points; 2) Goal difference; 3) Goals scored
(R) Relegated
