= 1967–68 Chelsea F.C. season =

English football club season

Chelsea
1967–68 season
- Chairman: Charles Pratt, Jr.
- Manager: Tommy Docherty (until September); Dave Sexton
- Stadium: Stamford Bridge
- First Division: 6th
- FA Cup: Quarter-finals
- League Cup: Second round
- Top goalscorer: League: Peter Osgood (16); All: Peter Osgood (17)
- Highest home attendance: 57,987 vs Norwich City (17 February 1968)
- Lowest home attendance: 22,742 vs Sheffield United (6 September 1967)
- Average home league attendance: 35,979
- Biggest win: 4–1 v Leicester City (16 March 1968)
- Biggest defeat: 0–7 v Leeds United (7 October 1967)
Home colours	Away colours

The 1967–68 season was Chelsea Football Club's fifty-fourth competitive season. Manager Tommy Docherty was dismissed early in the season and succeeded by former Chelsea coach Dave Sexton. The club finished 6th in the First Division and reached the quarter-finals of the FA Cup.

== Table ==
Pos	Team	Pld	W	D	L	GF	GA	GAv	Pts	Qualification or relegation
4	Leeds United	42	22	9	11	71	41	1.732	53	Qualification for the Inter-Cities Fairs Cup first round
5	Everton	42	23	6	13	67	40	1.675	52	
6	Chelsea	42	18	12	12	62	68	0.912	48	Qualification for the Inter-Cities Fairs Cup first round (Note: Everton were ineligible to participate in the Inter-Cities Fairs Cup as Liverpool had already qualified. Under the rules of the cup, only one team per city could participate. Chelsea took their place as the highest-ranked team that had not already qualified for a European competition.)
7	Tottenham Hotspur	42	19	9	14	70	59	1.186	47	
8	West Bromwich Albion	42	17	12	13	75	62	1.210	46	Qualification for the European Cup Winners' Cup first round (Note: West Bromwich Albion qualified for the European Cup Winners' Cup as the 1967-68 FA Cup winners.)

Source: World Football
Rules for classification: 1) Points; 2) Goal average; 3) Goals scored
