= Eddie McCreadie =

Scottish football player and manager (1940–2026)

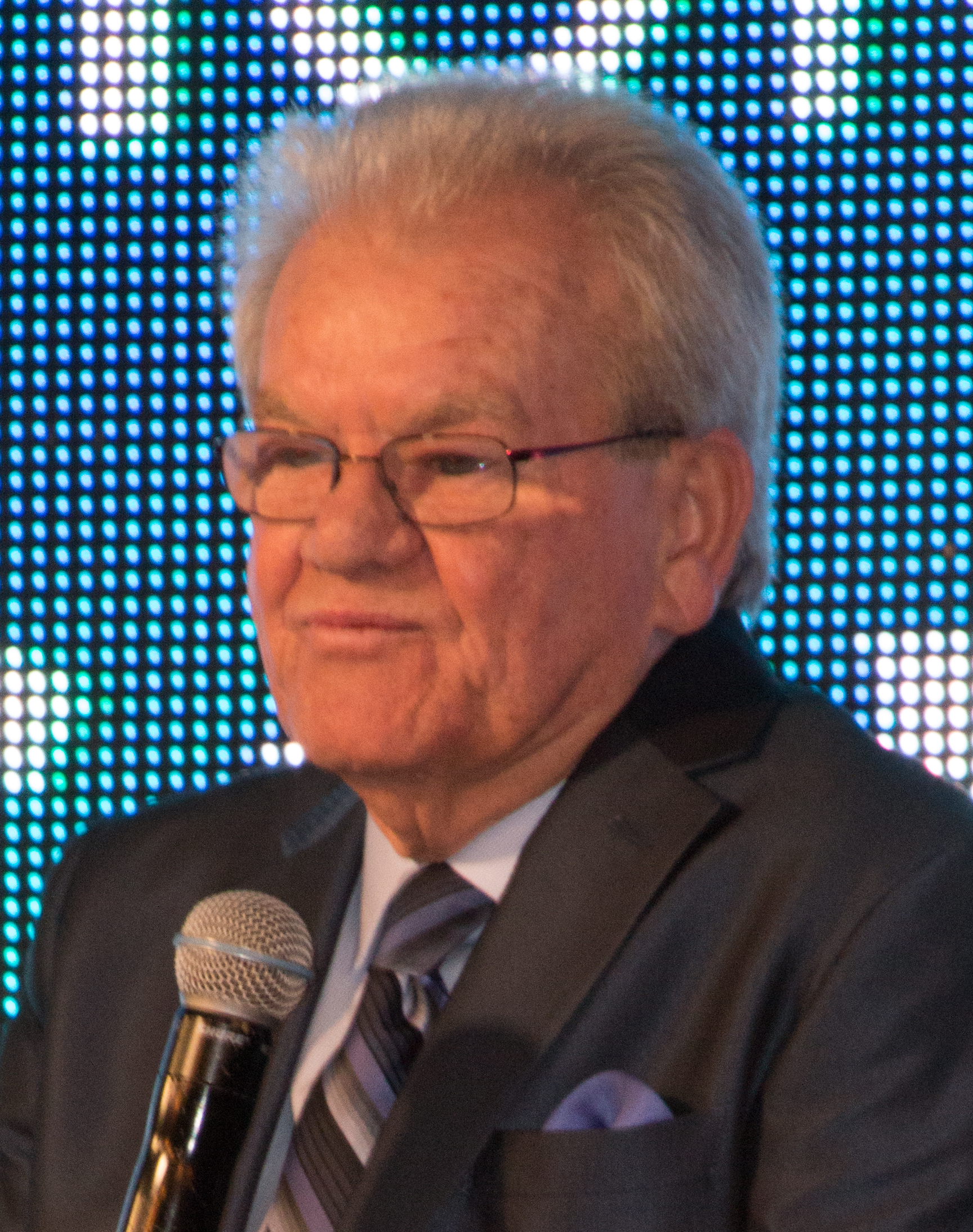
- McCreadie in 2017

Personal information
- Full name: Edward Graham McCreadie
- Date of birth: 15 April 1940
- Place of birth: Glasgow, Scotland
- Date of death: 12 January 2026 (aged 85)
- Place of death: Johnson City, Tennessee, U.S.
- Height: 1.78 m (5 ft 10 in)
- Position: Left-back

Senior career*
Years	Team	Apps	(Gls)
1959–1962	East Stirlingshire	29	(1)
1962–1973	Chelsea	331	(4)
1979	Memphis Rogues	1	(0)
Total		361	(5)

International career
1965–1969	Scotland	23	(0)

Managerial career
- 1975–1977: Chelsea
- 1978–1979: Memphis Rogues
- 1979–1982: Cleveland Force
- * Club domestic league appearances and goals

Edward Graham McCreadie (15 April 1940 – 12 January 2026) was a Scottish footballer who played at left-back, mainly for Chelsea. He later became a football manager.

== Playing career ==
McCreadie started his footballing career with amateur Scottish side Drumchapel before moving to Clydebank Juniors and then East Stirlingshire. He was signed by Chelsea in 1962 by manager Tommy Docherty for £5,000 to help the club's push for promotion from the Second Division. Docherty recounted that he discovered McCreadie by accident. He had attended an East Stirling match to watch another player named Gourlay, but "this left-back – I thought, "why the hell are you playing here?" He was great in the air, he was quick, his control was magic. I didn't know if he was a left-back or an outside left." As part of the deal Chelsea also agreed to play two friendly matches against East Stirlingshire. A match was played at Firs Park in 1963, but a return fixture was not scheduled. Over 50 years later, East Stirlingshire requested that Chelsea complete the agreement. Chelsea were promoted to the First Division later in 1962 and McCreadie became a fixture in the Chelsea defence for the next decade.

A talented and pacy attacking full-back with impressive timing, McCreadie was a regular starter in the Chelsea sides of the 1960s and 1970s alongside the likes of Bobby Tambling, Peter Osgood and Charlie Cooke. While he only scored five goals for the club throughout his career, McCreadie scored a memorable winner in the League Cup final of 1965 in which he dribbled 80 yards up the pitch before slotting the ball past Leicester City goalkeeper Gordon Banks to give his side a 3–2 first leg lead, which ultimately won the trophy for his club as the second leg at Filbert Street ended in a 0–0 draw.

After a string of high-league placings and near misses in the cups (including defeat in the 1967 FA Cup final) but no more silverware, McCreadie won the FA Cup with Chelsea in 1970, where a move involving him won the throw-in which created David Webb's winner in the replayed final against Leeds United at Old Trafford. The side won the Cup Winners' Cup the following season, but McCreadie missed the final in Athens through injury.

He was also a Scotland international, winning 23 caps between 1965 and 1969 after making his debut against England.

== Managerial career ==
Upon his retirement from playing in 1973, McCreadie joined the coaching staff at Chelsea having made 410 appearances for the club. In April 1975 he was appointed manager but by this stage the team was in decline with the club heavily in debt and he couldn't prevent relegation to the Second Division. Nevertheless, McCreadie re-built the side – taking the captaincy from John Hollins and giving it to 18-year-old Ray Wilkins in the process – and with no money to spend, put together a team of youth players and veterans from the club's heyday.

Chelsea were promoted back to the First Division in 1977. It was then that McCreadie lost his job in somewhat bizarre circumstances. Having won promotion, his request for a company car was rejected by chairman Brian Mears, so he resigned. Mears then relented and offered him the car but with his sense of pride he did not come back to the club as he had already made his mind up.

McCreadie left for the North American Soccer League in the late 1970s and was appointed manager of the Memphis Rogues, with whom he played one game in 1979, and later the indoor Cleveland Force before finally retiring from football in 1985. He lived in Tennessee in the United States.

== Death ==
McCreadie died on 12 January 2026, at the age of 85, in Johnson City, Tennessee, United States.

== Honours ==
Chelsea

- FA Cup: 1969–70; runner-up: 1966–67
- Football League Cup: 1964–65
