= 1959–60 Chelsea F.C. season =

English football club season

Chelsea
1959–60 season
- Chairman: Joe Mears
- Manager: Ted Drake
- Stadium: Stamford Bridge
- First Division: 18th place
- FA Cup: Fourth round
- Top goalscorer: League: Jimmy Greaves (29 goals); All: Jimmy Greaves (30 goals)
- Highest home attendance: 67,819 vs Tottenham Hotspur (15 April 1960)
- Lowest home attendance: 18,963 vs Leeds United (23 January 1960)
- Average home league attendance: 39,470
- Biggest win: 5–1 v Bradford Park Avenue (9 January 1960)
- Biggest defeat: 1–6 v Everton (12 March 1960)
Home colours	Away colours

The 1959–60 season was Chelsea Football Club's forty-sixth competitive season.

== Table ==
Pos	Team	Pld	W	D	L	GF	GA	GAv	Pts	Qualification or relegation
16	Manchester City	42	17	3	22	78	84	0.929	37	
17	Blackburn Rovers	42	16	5	21	60	70	0.857	37	
18	Chelsea	42	14	9	19	76	91	0.835	37	
19	Birmingham City	42	13	10	19	63	80	0.788	36	Qualification for the Inter-Cities Fairs Cup first round
20	Nottingham Forest	42	13	9	20	50	74	0.676	35	

Source: World Football
Rules for classification: 1) Points; 2) Goal average; 3) Goals scored
