= 1962–63 Football League =

64th season of the Football League

The Football League
- Season: 1962–63
- Champions: Everton
- New Club in League: Oxford United

The 1962–63 season was the 64th completed season of the English Football League.

== Final league tables ==
The tables below are reproduced here in the exact form that they can be found at The Rec.Sport.Soccer Statistics Foundation website and in Rothmans Book of Football League Records 1888–89 to 1978–79, with home and away statistics separated.

Beginning with the season 1894–95, clubs finishing level on points were separated according to goal average (goals scored divided by goals conceded), or more properly put, goal ratio. In a case where two or more teams had the same goal difference, this system favoured the team that had conceded, and therefore also scored, the fewest goals. The goal-average system was eventually scrapped beginning with the 1976–77 season.

Since the Fourth Division was established in the 1958–59 season, the bottom four teams of that division have been required to apply for re-election.

== First Division ==
First Division
- Season: 1962–63
- Champions: Everton; 6th English title
- Relegated: Manchester City; Leyton Orient
- European Cup: Everton
- Cup Winners' Cup: Tottenham Hotspur; Manchester United
- Inter-Cities Fairs Cup: Sheffield Wednesday; Arsenal
- Matches: 462
- Goals: 1,536 (3.32 per match)
- Top goalscorer: Jimmy Greaves (37 goals)
- Biggest home win: Wolverhampton Wanderers 8–1 Manchester City (18 August 1962); Tottenham Hotspur 9–2 Nottingham Forest (29 September 1962); Wolverhampton Wanderers 7–0 West Bromwich Albion (16 March 1963)
- Biggest away win: West Ham United 1–6 Tottenham Hotspur (25 August 1962); Manchester City 1–6 West Ham United (8 September 1962); Fulham 0–5 Wolverhampton Wanderers (8 December 1962)
- Highest scoring: Tottenham Hotspur 9–2 Nottingham Forest (29 September 1962)

Pos	Team	Pld	W	D	L	GF	GA	GAv	Pts	Qualification or relegation
1	Everton (C)	42	25	11	6	84	42	2.000	61	Qualification for the European Cup preliminary round
2	Tottenham Hotspur	42	23	9	10	111	62	1.790	55	Qualification for the European Cup Winners' Cup second round
3	Burnley	42	22	10	10	78	57	1.368	54	
4	Leicester City	42	20	12	10	79	53	1.491	52	
5	Wolverhampton Wanderers	42	20	10	12	93	65	1.431	50	
6	Sheffield Wednesday	42	19	10	13	77	63	1.222	48	Qualification for the Inter-Cities Fairs Cup first round
7	Arsenal	42	18	10	14	86	77	1.117	46	Qualification for the Inter-Cities Fairs Cup first round
8	Liverpool	42	17	10	15	71	59	1.203	44	
9	Nottingham Forest	42	17	10	15	67	69	0.971	44	
10	Sheffield United	42	16	12	14	58	60	0.967	44	
11	Blackburn Rovers	42	15	12	15	79	71	1.113	42	
12	West Ham United	42	14	12	16	73	69	1.058	40	
13	Blackpool	42	13	14	15	58	64	0.906	40	
14	West Bromwich Albion	42	16	7	19	71	79	0.899	39	
15	Aston Villa	42	15	8	19	62	68	0.912	38	
16	Fulham	42	14	10	18	50	71	0.704	38	
17	Ipswich Town	42	12	11	19	59	78	0.756	35	
18	Bolton Wanderers	42	15	5	22	55	75	0.733	35	
19	Manchester United	42	12	10	20	67	81	0.827	34	Qualification for the European Cup Winners' Cup first round
20	Birmingham City	42	10	13	19	63	90	0.700	33	
21	Manchester City (R)	42	10	11	21	58	102	0.569	31	Relegation to the Second Division
22	Leyton Orient (R)	42	6	9	27	37	81	0.457	21	Relegation to the Second Division

Source: World Football
Rules for classification: 1) Points; 2) Goal average; 3) Goals scored
(C) Champions; (R) Relegated

=== Results ===
Home \ Away	ARS	AST	BIR	BLB	BLP	BOL	BUR	EVE	FUL	IPS	LEI	LEY	LIV	MCI	MUN	NOT	SHU	SHW	TOT	WBA	WHU	WOL
Arsenal		1–2	2–0	3–1	2–0	3–2	2–3	4–3	3–0	3–1	1–1	2–0	2–2	2–3	1–3	0–0	1–0	1–2	2–3	3–2	1–1	5–4
Aston Villa	3–1		4–0	0–0	1–1	5–0	2–1	0–2	1–2	4–2	3–1	1–0	2–0	3–1	1–2	0–2	1–2	0–2	2–1	2–0	3–1	0–2
Birmingham	2–2	3–2		3–3	3–6	2–2	5–1	0–1	4–1	0–1	3–2	2–2	0–2	2–2	2–1	2–2	0–1	1–1	0–2	0–0	3–2	3–4
Blackburn Rovers	5–5	4–1	6–1		3–3	5–0	2–3	3–2	0–1	0–1	2–0	1–1	1–0	4–1	2–2	2–5	1–2	3–0	3–0	3–1	0–4	5–1
Blackpool	3–2	4–0	1–1	4–1		3–1	0–0	1–2	0–0	1–0	1–1	3–2	1–2	2–2	2–2	2–1	3–1	2–3	1–2	0–2	0–0	0–2
Bolton Wanderers	3–0	4–1	0–0	0–0	3–0		2–2	0–2	1–0	1–3	2–0	0–1	1–0	3–1	3–0	1–0	3–2	0–4	1–0	1–2	3–0	3–0
Burnley	2–1	3–1	3–1	1–0	2–0	2–1		1–3	4–0	3–1	1–1	2–0	1–3	0–0	0–1	0–0	5–1	4–0	2–1	2–1	1–1	2–0
Everton	1–1	1–1	2–2	0–0	5–0	1–0	3–1		4–1	3–1	3–2	3–0	2–2	2–1	3–1	2–0	3–0	4–1	1–0	4–2	1–1	0–0
Fulham	1–3	1–0	3–3	0–0	2–0	2–1	1–1	1–0		1–1	2–1	0–2	0–0	2–4	0–1	3–1	2–2	4–1	0–2	1–2	2–0	0–5
Ipswich Town	1–1	1–1	1–5	3–3	5–2	4–1	2–1	0–3	0–1		0–1	1–1	2–2	0–0	3–5	1–1	1–0	2–0	2–4	1–1	2–3	2–3
Leicester City	2–0	3–3	3–0	2–0	0–0	4–1	3–3	3–1	2–3	3–0		5–1	3–0	2–0	4–3	2–1	3–1	3–3	2–2	1–0	2–0	1–1
Leyton Orient	1–2	0–2	2–2	1–1	0–2	0–1	0–1	3–0	1–1	1–2	0–2		2–1	1–1	1–0	0–1	2–2	2–4	1–5	2–3	2–0	0–4
Liverpool	2–1	4–0	5–1	3–1	1–2	1–0	1–2	0–0	2–1	1–1	0–2	5–0		4–1	1–0	0–2	2–0	0–2	5–2	2–2	2–1	4–1
Manchester City	2–4	0–2	2–1	0–1	0–3	2–1	2–5	1–1	2–3	2–1	1–1	2–0	2–2		1–1	1–0	1–3	3–2	1–0	1–5	1–6	3–3
Manchester United	2–3	2–2	2–0	0–3	1–1	3–0	2–5	0–1	0–2	0–1	2–2	3–1	3–3	2–3		5–1	1–1	1–3	0–2	2–2	3–1	2–1
Nottingham Forest	3–0	3–1	0–2	2–0	2–0	1–0	2–1	3–4	3–1	2–1	0–2	1–1	3–1	1–1	3–2		2–1	0–3	1–1	2–2	3–4	2–0
Sheffield United	3–3	2–1	0–2	1–1	0–0	4–1	1–0	2–1	2–0	2–1	0–0	2–0	0–0	3–1	1–1	3–1		2–2	3–1	1–0	0–2	1–2
Sheffield Wednesday	2–3	0–0	5–0	4–0	0–0	1–1	0–1	2–2	1–0	0–3	0–3	3–1	0–2	4–1	1–0	2–2	3–1		3–1	3–1	1–3	3–1
Tottenham Hotspur	4–4	4–2	3–0	4–1	2–0	4–1	1–1	0–0	1–1	5–0	4–0	2–0	7–2	4–2	6–2	9–2	4–2	1–1		2–1	4–4	1–2
West Bromwich Albion	1–2	1–0	1–0	2–5	1–2	5–4	1–2	0–4	6–1	6–1	2–1	2–1	1–0	2–1	3–0	1–4	1–2	0–3	1–2		1–0	2–2
West Ham United	0–4	1–1	5–0	0–1	2–2	1–2	1–1	1–2	2–2	1–3	2–0	2–0	1–0	6–1	3–1	4–1	1–1	2–0	1–6	2–2		1–4
Wolverhampton Wanderers	1–0	3–1	0–2	4–2	2–0	4–0	7–2	0–2	2–1	0–0	1–3	2–1	3–2	8–1	2–3	1–1	0–0	2–2	2–2	7–0	0–0	

Updated to match(es) played on unknown. Source: Ian Laschke: Rothmans Book of Football League Records 1888–89 to 1978–79. Macdonald and Jane’s, London & Sydney, 1980.
Legend: Blue = home team win; Yellow = draw; Red = away team win.

=== Maps ===
Locations of the Football League First Division London teams 1962–1963
Locations of the Football League First Division 1962–1963 teams

== Second Division ==
Second Division
- Season: 1962–63
- Champions: Stoke City
- Promoted: Stoke City; Chelsea
- Relegated: Walsall; Luton Town
- Matches: 462
- Goals: 1,496 (3.24 per match)
- Top goalscorer: Bobby Tambling (35 goals)

Pos	Team	Pld	W	D	L	GF	GA	GAv	Pts	Qualification or relegation
1	Stoke City (C, P)	42	20	13	9	73	50	1.460	53	Promotion to the First Division
2	Chelsea (P)	42	24	4	14	81	42	1.929	52	Promotion to the First Division
3	Sunderland	42	20	12	10	84	55	1.527	52	
4	Middlesbrough	42	20	9	13	86	85	1.012	49	
5	Leeds United	42	19	10	13	79	53	1.491	48	
6	Huddersfield Town	42	17	14	11	63	50	1.260	48	
7	Newcastle United	42	18	11	13	79	59	1.339	47	
8	Bury	42	18	11	13	51	47	1.085	47	
9	Scunthorpe United	42	16	12	14	57	59	0.966	44	
10	Cardiff City	42	18	7	17	83	73	1.137	43	
11	Southampton	42	17	8	17	72	67	1.075	42	
12	Plymouth Argyle	42	15	12	15	76	73	1.041	42	
13	Norwich City	42	17	8	17	80	79	1.013	42	
14	Rotherham United	42	17	6	19	67	74	0.905	40	
15	Swansea Town	42	15	9	18	51	72	0.708	39	
16	Portsmouth	42	13	11	18	63	79	0.797	37	
17	Preston North End	42	13	11	18	59	74	0.797	37	
18	Derby County	42	12	12	18	61	72	0.847	36	
19	Grimsby Town	42	11	13	18	55	66	0.833	35	
20	Charlton Athletic	42	13	5	24	62	94	0.660	31	
21	Walsall (R)	42	11	9	22	53	89	0.596	31	Relegation to the Third Division
22	Luton Town (R)	42	11	7	24	61	84	0.726	29	Relegation to the Third Division

Rules for classification: 1) Points; 2) Goal average; 3) Goals scored
(C) Champions; (P) Promoted; (R) Relegated

=== Results ===
Home \ Away	BRY	CAR	CHA	CHE	DER	GRI	HUD	LEE	LUT	MID	NEW	NWC	PLY	POR	PNE	ROT	SCU	SOU	STK	SUN	SWA	WAL
Bury		1–0	3–1	2–0	3–3	2–0	1–1	3–1	1–0	1–0	0–0	0–3	1–2	2–0	0–0	0–5	0–2	1–1	2–1	3–0	2–0	0–0
Cardiff City	3–1		1–2	1–0	1–0	5–3	3–0	0–0	1–0	1–2	4–4	2–4	2–1	1–2	1–1	4–1	4–0	3–1	1–1	5–2	5–2	2–2
Charlton Athletic	0–0	2–4		1–4	0–0	0–3	1–0	1–2	2–0	3–4	1–2	0–2	6–3	2–0	2–1	2–3	1–0	2–1	0–3	2–2	2–2	3–2
Chelsea	2–0	6–0	5–0		3–1	2–1	1–2	2–2	3–1	3–2	4–2	2–0	1–1	7–0	2–0	3–0	3–0	2–0	0–1	1–0	2–2	0–1
Derby County	0–0	1–2	2–3	1–3		2–4	2–1	0–0	1–0	3–3	0–1	3–0	3–2	4–0	1–0	3–2	6–2	3–1	1–1	2–2	0–2	2–0
Grimsby Town	5–1	1–2	2–1	0–3	0–0		1–1	1–1	3–1	3–4	0–1	0–2	1–1	1–1	2–0	1–2	3–0	4–1	1–1	1–2	1–0	3–1
Huddersfield Town	0–1	1–0	2–0	1–0	3–3	0–0		1–1	2–0	0–0	2–1	0–0	4–2	1–3	1–0	1–0	2–0	2–3	3–3	0–3	4–1	4–0
Leeds United	1–2	3–0	4–1	2–0	3–1	3–0	0–1		3–0	2–3	1–0	3–0	6–1	3–3	4–1	3–4	1–0	1–1	3–1	1–0	5–0	3–0
Luton Town	2–1	2–3	4–1	0–2	1–2	2–2	3–2	2–2		4–3	2–3	4–2	3–0	3–3	0–2	2–3	1–0	3–2	0–0	0–3	3–1	4–3
Middlesbrough	0–0	3–2	2–1	1–0	5–1	0–1	0–5	2–1	0–2		4–2	6–2	3–0	4–2	2–0	2–1	4–3	1–2	2–2	3–3	2–2	2–3
Newcastle United	1–3	2–1	3–2	2–0	0–0	0–0	1–1	1–1	3–1	6–1		2–1	3–1	1–1	2–2	4–1	1–1	4–1	5–2	1–1	6–0	0–2
Norwich City	1–1	0–0	1–4	4–1	2–0	0–0	2–3	3–2	3–3	3–4	1–2		2–1	5–3	1–1	4–2	3–3	1–0	6–0	4–2	5–0	2–1
Plymouth Argyle	0–0	4–2	6–1	2–1	2–1	2–0	1–1	3–1	3–1	4–5	0–2	1–0		2–0	7–1	2–2	2–3	2–1	0–1	1–1	1–0	3–0
Portsmouth	2–1	2–0	3–3	0–2	1–0	2–1	1–1	3–0	3–1	1–1	3–1	0–2	1–2		1–2	1–2	1–2	1–1	0–3	3–1	0–0	4–1
Preston North End	0–2	2–6	4–1	1–3	1–0	0–0	2–0	4–1	3–1	0–1	2–1	2–2	0–0	4–2		2–2	3–1	1–0	1–1	1–1	6–3	4–2
Rotherham United	1–5	2–1	1–2	0–1	2–2	0–0	0–2	2–1	2–1	4–1	3–1	0–3	3–2	0–0	3–1		1–0	2–0	1–2	4–2	2–1	1–2
Scunthorpe United	1–0	2–2	2–0	3–0	2–1	1–1	2–2	0–2	2–0	1–1	2–1	3–1	2–2	1–2	4–1	1–0		2–1	0–0	1–1	1–0	2–0
Southampton	0–3	3–5	1–0	2–1	5–0	4–1	3–1	3–1	2–2	6–0	3–0	3–1	1–1	4–2	1–0	1–0	1–1		2–0	2–4	3–0	2–0
Stoke City	2–0	1–0	6–3	0–0	3–3	4–1	2–1	0–1	2–0	0–1	3–1	3–0	2–2	3–1	3–0	3–1	2–3	3–1		2–1	2–0	3–0
Sunderland	0–1	2–1	1–0	0–1	3–0	6–2	1–1	2–1	3–1	3–1	0–0	7–1	1–1	1–0	2–1	2–0	0–0	4–0	0–0		3–1	5–0
Swansea Town	3–0	2–1	2–1	2–0	2–0	1–0	1–2	0–2	1–0	1–1	1–0	2–0	2–1	0–0	1–1	2–2	1–0	1–1	2–1	3–4		3–0
Walsall	3–1	2–1	1–2	1–5	1–3	4–1	1–1	1–1	1–1	1–0	0–6	3–1	2–2	3–5	4–1	1–0	1–1	1–1	0–0	2–3	0–1	

Updated to match(es) played on unknown. Source: Ian Laschke: Rothmans Book of Football League Records 1888–89 to 1978–79. Macdonald and Jane’s, London & Sydney, 1980.
Legend: Blue = home team win; Yellow = draw; Red = away team win.

=== Maps ===
Locations of the Football League Second Division London teams 1962–1963
Locations of the Football League Second Division 1962–1963 teams

== Third Division ==
Football League Third Division
- Season: 1962–63
- Champions: Northampton Town (1st english third division title)
- Promoted: Swindon Town
- Relegated: Bradford Park Avenue, Brighton & Hove Albion, Carlisle United, Halifax Town
- Matches: 552
- Goals: 1,855 (3.36 per match)
- Top goalscorer: George Hudson (Peterborough United), 30

Pos	Team	Pld	W	D	L	GF	GA	GAv	Pts	Promotion or relegation
1	Northampton Town (C, P)	46	26	10	10	109	60	1.817	62	Promotion to the Second Division
2	Swindon Town (P)	46	22	14	10	87	56	1.554	58	Promotion to the Second Division
3	Port Vale	46	23	8	15	72	58	1.241	54	
4	Coventry City	46	18	17	11	83	69	1.203	53	
5	Bournemouth & Boscombe Athletic	46	18	16	12	63	46	1.370	52	
6	Peterborough United	46	20	11	15	93	75	1.240	51	
7	Notts County	46	19	13	14	73	74	0.986	51	
8	Southend United	46	19	12	15	75	77	0.974	50	
9	Wrexham	46	20	9	17	84	83	1.012	49	
10	Hull City	46	19	10	17	74	69	1.072	48	
11	Crystal Palace	46	17	13	16	68	58	1.172	47	
12	Colchester United	46	18	11	17	73	93	0.785	47	
13	Queens Park Rangers	46	17	11	18	85	76	1.118	45	
14	Bristol City	46	16	13	17	100	92	1.087	45	
15	Shrewsbury Town	46	16	12	18	83	81	1.025	44	
16	Millwall	46	15	13	18	82	87	0.943	43	
17	Watford	46	17	8	21	82	85	0.965	42	
18	Barnsley	46	15	11	20	63	74	0.851	41	
19	Bristol Rovers	46	15	11	20	70	88	0.795	41	
20	Reading	46	16	8	22	74	78	0.949	40	
21	Bradford (Park Avenue) (R)	46	14	12	20	79	97	0.814	40	Relegation to the Fourth Division
22	Brighton & Hove Albion (R)	46	12	12	22	58	84	0.690	36	Relegation to the Fourth Division
23	Carlisle United (R)	46	13	9	24	61	89	0.685	35	Relegation to the Fourth Division
24	Halifax Town (R)	46	9	12	25	64	106	0.604	30	Relegation to the Fourth Division

(C) Champions; (P) Promoted; (R) Relegated

=== Results ===
Home \ Away	BAR	B&BA	BPA	B&HA	BRI	BRR	CRL	COL	COV	CRY	HAL	HUL	MIL	NOR	NTC	PET	PTV	QPR	REA	SHR	STD	SWI	WAT	WRE
Barnsley		2–2	1–4	2–0	1–1	4–0	2–0	2–3	2–1	0–4	1–0	1–2	4–1	1–1	3–1	0–2	2–1	0–0	1–0	1–0	2–2	1–1	4–1	2–1
Bournemouth & Boscombe Athletic	1–1		2–2	1–0	1–1	1–1	5–1	1–1	1–1	3–0	1–1	3–0	1–1	3–0	3–1	3–3	2–0	2–1	1–0	0–0	0–0	0–0	1–0	3–1
Bradford Park Avenue	1–1	1–1		1–5	2–5	2–2	3–1	1–1	0–0	2–1	1–1	3–1	2–2	2–3	5–0	2–2	2–1	0–3	3–2	2–1	2–2	2–0	1–0	3–1
Brighton & Hove Albion	2–0	0–1	3–1		1–0	1–1	1–0	3–0	2–2	1–2	0–1	2–1	0–2	0–5	1–3	0–3	3–1	2–2	2–4	1–1	0–0	1–1	1–4	1–3
Bristol City	5–2	1–0	4–2	1–2		4–1	2–2	1–2	1–1	1–1	2–2	3–1	2–2	3–1	1–1	1–1	2–0	2–4	4–2	3–1	6–3	2–2	3–3	0–2
Bristol Rovers	3–2	1–2	3–3	4–1	1–2		1–1	2–0	2–2	2–0	5–2	2–5	2–0	2–2	1–1	3–1	1–1	0–0	1–0	2–0	1–2	2–0	3–1	1–1
Carlisle United	2–1	0–3	3–0	1–0	2–5	4–0		3–1	0–1	2–2	1–0	2–1	4–3	1–2	4–2	1–4	1–1	2–5	1–1	2–1	1–2	0–0	2–1	2–1
Colchester United	1–1	3–1	1–4	4–1	1–0	1–0	2–1		0–0	1–2	1–1	2–3	2–5	2–2	2–2	2–0	0–1	2–1	4–2	3–2	3–1	0–2	3–2	1–1
Coventry City	2–0	1–2	3–1	1–1	4–2	5–0	3–2	2–2		1–0	5–4	2–2	2–0	1–1	2–0	3–3	0–1	4–1	2–1	0–0	3–4	2–0	3–1	3–0
Crystal Palace	1–2	1–0	6–0	2–2	3–2	2–1	3–0	0–1	0–0		0–0	1–1	3–0	1–2	1–1	0–2	2–1	1–0	2–1	2–2	2–3	0–0	0–1	5–0
Halifax Town	2–0	3–1	4–4	2–1	2–5	2–3	2–4	1–2	2–4	2–2		0–2	3–0	1–3	2–1	2–0	0–4	1–4	1–2	2–2	0–1	4–3	1–3	2–0
Hull City	0–2	1–1	1–0	2–1	4–0	3–0	3–1	2–2	2–0	0–0	2–0		4–1	2–0	1–1	3–2	0–1	4–1	0–1	2–2	1–2	1–1	1–0	1–3
Millwall	4–1	1–0	3–1	2–2	4–2	2–1	2–0	2–1	3–3	1–1	1–1	5–1		1–3	0–2	0–1	0–0	0–0	4–1	1–2	3–1	3–4	6–0	2–4
Northampton Town	4–2	2–2	3–1	3–0	5–1	2–0	2–0	3–1	0–0	3–1	7–1	3–0	1–1		2–2	2–3	0–0	1–0	5–0	1–0	5–3	1–1	1–0	8–0
Notts County	2–0	2–0	3–2	0–1	3–2	1–3	1–0	6–0	1–1	0–2	5–0	1–1	3–3	2–1		2–0	1–0	3–2	1–0	1–5	2–1	2–0	1–3	3–2
Peterborough United	4–2	3–0	2–0	3–1	3–1	1–0	2–2	6–2	0–3	0–0	1–1	1–3	6–0	0–4	0–0		3–1	1–2	1–1	2–3	1–3	3–1	4–0	1–3
Port Vale	1–0	0–3	2–1	1–2	3–1	2–0	2–0	4–2	2–1	4–1	2–0	1–0	1–1	3–1	1–1	3–2		3–2	2–0	0–0	5–1	2–1	1–3	2–2
Queens Park Rangers	2–1	1–0	1–2	2–2	3–1	3–5	2–2	1–2	1–3	4–1	5–0	4–1	2–3	1–3	0–1	0–0	3–1		3–2	0–0	1–0	2–2	2–2	1–2
Reading	4–1	2–1	4–1	4–5	0–3	1–0	2–0	4–1	4–1	0–1	4–2	2–2	2–0	2–1	1–1	0–1	4–3	1–1		5–0	1–3	1–2	0–0	3–0
Shrewsbury Town	1–3	2–1	1–2	2–1	3–3	7–2	1–1	1–2	2–1	3–1	4–2	1–4	3–3	1–0	2–2	5–4	2–1	0–3	2–1		6–0	1–2	3–0	4–2
Southend	0–0	0–1	3–1	1–1	2–2	3–2	2–0	2–3	1–1	1–0	1–1	0–1	2–1	5–1	1–2	2–1	2–0	1–3	2–0	3–1		1–1	1–1	2–0
Swindon Town	2–1	2–1	2–1	5–1	3–2	3–0	2–0	6–1	4–1	1–0	1–1	2–0	1–0	2–3	3–1	2–3	2–3	5–0	1–1	1–0	4–1		3–1	3–0
Watford	0–0	0–1	3–2	2–0	1–4	0–1	5–1	1–1	6–1	1–4	2–1	4–2	0–2	4–2	4–0	2–3	1–2	2–5	4–0	4–3	3–1	3–3		3–1
Wrexham	2–1	1–0	3–1	0–0	2–1	5–2	2–1	4–1	5–1	3–4	3–1	2–0	5–1	1–4	5–1	4–4	0–1	3–1	1–1	2–0	1–1	0–0	0–0	

Updated to match(es) played on unknown. Source: Ian Laschke: Rothmans Book of Football League Records 1888–89 to 1978–79. Macdonald and Jane’s, London & Sydney, 1980.
Legend: Blue = home team win; Yellow = draw; Red = away team win.

=== Maps ===
Locations of the Football League Third Division London teams 1962–1963
Locations of the Football League Third Division teams 1962–1963

== Fourth Division ==
Football League Fourth Division
- Season: 1962–63
- Champions: Brentford (1st english fourth division title)
- Promoted: Crewe Alexandra, Mansfield Town, Oldham Athletic
- Failed re-election: none
- New club in the league: Oxford United
- Matches: 552
- Goals: 1,755 (3.18 per match)
- Top goalscorer: Ken Wagstaff (Mansfield Town), 34

Pos	Team	Pld	W	D	L	GF	GA	GAv	Pts	Promotion or relegation
1	Brentford (C, P)	46	27	8	11	98	64	1.531	62	Promotion to the Third Division
2	Oldham Athletic (P)	46	24	11	11	95	60	1.583	59	Promotion to the Third Division
3	Crewe Alexandra (P)	46	24	11	11	86	58	1.483	59	Promotion to the Third Division
4	Mansfield Town (P)	46	24	9	13	108	69	1.565	57	Promotion to the Third Division
5	Gillingham	46	22	13	11	71	49	1.449	57	
6	Torquay United	46	20	16	10	75	56	1.339	56	
7	Rochdale	46	20	11	15	67	59	1.136	51	
8	Tranmere Rovers	46	20	10	16	81	67	1.209	50	
9	Barrow	46	19	12	15	82	80	1.025	50	
10	Workington	46	17	13	16	76	68	1.118	47	
11	Aldershot	46	15	17	14	73	69	1.058	47	
12	Darlington	46	19	6	21	72	87	0.828	44	
13	Southport	46	15	14	17	72	106	0.679	44	
14	York City	46	16	11	19	67	62	1.081	43	
15	Chesterfield	46	13	16	17	70	64	1.094	42	
16	Doncaster Rovers	46	14	14	18	64	77	0.831	42	
17	Exeter City	46	16	10	20	57	77	0.740	42	
18	Oxford United	46	13	15	18	70	71	0.986	41	
19	Stockport County	46	15	11	20	56	70	0.800	41	
20	Newport County	46	14	11	21	76	90	0.844	39	
21	Chester	46	15	9	22	51	66	0.773	39	Re-elected
22	Lincoln City	46	13	9	24	68	89	0.764	35	Re-elected
23	Bradford City	46	11	10	25	64	93	0.688	32	Re-elected
24	Hartlepools United	46	7	11	28	56	104	0.538	25	Re-elected

Source: rsssf.com
(C) Champions; (P) Promoted

=== Results ===
Home \ Away	ALD	BRW	BRA	BRE	CHE	CHF	CRE	DAR	DON	EXE	GIL	HAR	LIN	MAN	NPC	OLD	OXF	ROC	SOU	STP	TOR	TRA	WRK	YOR
Aldershot		2–1	3–1	0–0	2–2	1–0	2–2	2–3	3–1	1–1	0–1	3–2	1–2	2–3	2–1	1–1	0–0	2–0	4–2	2–2	1–1	2–3	2–2	4–1
Barrow	1–1		1–1	1–1	4–3	2–0	2–3	4–1	4–0	0–2	1–1	2–0	2–1	3–2	3–0	3–2	3–2	1–1	6–2	1–0	0–0	1–1	5–1	2–1
Bradford City	0–2	3–0		2–1	2–0	1–1	1–0	3–0	2–3	2–3	1–1	1–1	2–2	1–3	3–4	1–3	1–4	1–2	0–2	3–2	2–1	2–1	2–2	1–2
Brentford	4–2	2–1	5–2		2–1	2–1	3–1	1–3	1–0	3–1	1–2	4–0	3–2	1–3	3–1	2–1	4–0	1–0	3–3	2–1	2–2	4–0	4–3	2–1
Chester	0–2	1–0	2–0	1–2		0–2	1–2	1–2	1–1	3–1	1–0	1–0	3–2	0–2	2–2	1–0	2–1	1–0	6–1	0–1	3–1	0–0	1–1	0–0
Chesterfield	3–1	1–1	0–1	1–1	1–1		1–2	6–1	3–1	1–1	0–2	2–2	2–2	4–4	1–2	0–0	1–0	1–3	6–0	1–2	2–0	4–0	1–1	1–1
Crewe Alexandra	2–1	2–1	5–0	3–0	3–0	2–0		2–1	3–0	1–0	2–2	4–1	1–1	3–0	4–1	2–3	3–2	1–2	2–2	1–2	1–1	2–0	0–1	1–0
Darlington	1–1	2–1	2–1	1–3	2–1	2–1	1–4		5–1	0–1	2–0	0–2	0–0	2–1	4–2	1–1	2–1	3–0	1–3	5–1	1–3	2–3	3–1	2–1
Doncaster Rovers	2–1	2–2	1–1	0–2	1–2	0–0	1–1	2–0		1–1	1–0	2–3	3–0	1–1	2–2	1–1	4–2	2–2	0–0	1–2	2–0	2–1	2–0	3–2
Exeter City	4–2	0–2	0–2	2–2	2–1	2–2	1–1	1–3	0–1		0–0	3–1	1–1	0–3	1–0	2–1	1–1	0–2	2–1	0–1	0–3	2–1	1–0	2–1
Gillingham	1–0	2–3	2–1	1–4	2–1	2–1	4–0	1–0	1–0	4–0		5–1	3–0	0–1	3–1	4–3	2–1	2–1	3–1	1–0	4–2	0–0	2–2	0–0
Hartlepool	1–2	1–1	2–2	2–1	0–3	1–1	1–5	0–2	1–1	0–2	1–1		3–0	3–4	2–3	0–1	1–2	4–0	4–0	3–0	0–3	0–2	2–2	1–1
Lincoln City	2–4	1–2	3–2	1–3	1–3	1–3	1–2	2–1	1–2	4–1	2–1	4–1		2–6	6–3	1–2	1–0	3–0	0–2	0–0	3–0	4–2	3–2	2–4
Mansfield Town	2–2	5–0	3–1	1–2	4–0	3–0	2–2	6–0	4–2	1–0	0–0	3–1	2–0		2–1	4–2	3–2	1–0	6–1	0–1	1–2	6–1	0–0	2–0
Newport County	2–2	6–0	2–0	1–4	0–1	2–3	5–1	2–2	2–4	4–0	2–0	2–1	2–1	1–1		0–0	1–0	1–1	1–0	3–1	1–0	1–2	2–2	1–3
Oldham Athletic	2–0	2–1	2–1	2–1	2–0	2–1	2–2	1–0	4–0	1–2	2–1	6–1	4–1	3–2	3–2		2–0	5–1	11–0	2–1	1–1	1–1	2–2	3–2
Oxford United	1–1	4–1	2–1	2–1	3–0	0–0	0–0	4–2	3–3	0–3	2–3	6–2	2–1	3–0	5–1	1–1		0–0	0–0	1–1	1–1	2–2	2–1	0–2
Rochdale	1–1	6–0	2–1	3–5	0–0	3–2	2–0	1–1	3–1	3–0	1–1	2–1	1–0	3–1	3–3	1–1	2–1		1–0	1–0	3–0	2–0	3–2	1–0
Southport	1–1	3–3	3–3	1–0	4–1	0–2	1–3	4–2	2–1	1–3	0–0	1–1	0–0	3–2	2–1	2–1	4–2	1–1		2–0	4–4	0–0	6–3	2–1
Stockport County	3–0	1–3	3–1	2–1	1–0	0–1	1–1	0–1	2–1	4–3	0–0	4–1	1–2	1–1	1–1	2–1	1–1	1–0	0–2		1–2	2–2	2–3	1–1
Torquay United	3–1	2–1	4–1	1–1	1–0	2–1	1–2	1–1	2–2	3–0	0–0	2–0	0–0	3–3	3–1	2–0	2–2	2–1	5–1	2–2		1–0	2–0	1–0
Tranmere	1–3	2–0	1–1	1–2	3–0	4–1	2–1	3–1	2–3	2–1	2–1	6–1	3–0	5–1	0–0	1–2	3–0	3–2	7–1	3–1	1–1		0–1	2–1
Workington	0–1	3–5	2–3	3–1	3–0	0–0	0–1	2–0	1–0	3–1	5–2	0–0	1–1	3–2	4–0	0–1	0–0	1–0	2–0	4–0	1–2	1–0		3–0
York City	0–0	1–1	3–0	1–1	0–0	3–4	2–0	5–1	1–0	3–3	0–3	2–0	3–1	2–1	2–0	5–2	1–2	1–0	1–1	3–1	1–0	1–2	1–2	

Updated to match(es) played on unknown. Source: Ian Laschke: Rothmans Book of Football League Records 1888–89 to 1978–79. Macdonald and Jane’s, London & Sydney, 1980.
Legend: Blue = home team win; Yellow = draw; Red = away team win.

=== Maps ===
Locations of the Football League Fourth Division London teams 1962–1963
Locations of the Football League Fourth Division teams 1962–1963

== Attendances ==
=== Division One ===
No.	Club	Average	±	Highest	Lowest
1	Tottenham Hotspur FC	45,576	-14.2%	59,371	32,509
2	Everton FC	41,432	-4.6%	54,369	30,391
3	Arsenal FC	34,447	0.4%	63,440	18,771
4	Manchester United	33,491	-11.6%	57,135	20,807
5	Aston Villa FC	32,056	-4.6%	49,892	22,174
6	Sheffield Wednesday FC	28,401	-2.8%	50,791	17,475
7	Burnley FC	27,125	13.8%	46,810	21,526
8	Chelsea FC	27,013	-10.4%	51,282	12,404
9	West Ham United FC	25,733	17.2%	36,274	18,213
10	Manchester City FC	25,626	-12.9%	49,959	15,971
11	Wolverhampton Wanderers FC	24,803	-19.7%	45,687	14,597
12	Fulham FC	24,401	6.0%	43,355	12,639
13	Birmingham City FC	23,537	-8.7%	43,489	17,214
14	Nottingham Forest FC	23,517	-4.7%	40,875	17,419
15	Ipswich Town FC	22,863	51.5%	30,649	16,587
16	Sheffield United FC	22,526	21.8%	38,497	16,838
17	West Bromwich Albion FC	21,006	-15.0%	39,071	13,894
18	Leicester City FC	19,469	-19.1%	29,396	14,093
19	Cardiff City FC	19,294	-17.5%	33,606	8,608
20	Blackpool FC	18,618	-0.5%	31,660	10,641
21	Bolton Wanderers FC	17,519	-19.2%	34,366	11,231
22	Blackburn Rovers FC	15,906	-17.8%	33,914	8,876

=== Division Two ===
No.	Club	Average	±	Highest	Lowest
1	Sunderland AFC	40,883	23.9%	62,420	29,976
2	Newcastle United FC	31,634	13.2%	62,321	13,552
3	Chelsea FC	29,376	8.7%	66,199	18,377
4	Stoke City FC	25,426	61.4%	42,394	11,593
5	Leeds United FC	20,213	48.5%	28,413	11,314
6	Norwich City FC	19,197	-5.2%	28,794	10,395
7	Middlesbrough FC	16,545	4.6%	43,509	7,626
8	Huddersfield Town AFC	16,174	22.4%	34,946	7,964
9	Portsmouth FC	16,043	-3.7%	32,412	7,773
10	Plymouth Argyle FC	15,930	13.9%	23,684	7,455
11	Cardiff City FC	15,567	-19.3%	27,569	8,389
12	Southampton FC	15,267	10.9%	25,463	8,728
13	Charlton Athletic FC	13,420	-5.6%	21,307	10,269
14	Derby County FC	12,092	-24.1%	24,408	8,673
15	Preston North End FC	11,694	-10.5%	14,697	7,652
16	Bury FC	11,270	7.2%	25,376	5,170
17	Grimsby Town FC	11,216	18.4%	16,533	7,188
18	Swansea City AFC	10,365	-14.9%	24,687	5,532
19	Rotherham United FC	10,190	6.7%	20,013	7,270
20	Walsall FC	9,824	-22.7%	16,761	5,451
21	Scunthorpe United FC	9,070	-7.7%	14,293	6,012
22	Luton Town FC	8,148	-22.6%	16,419	5,428

=== Division Three ===
No.	Club	Average	±	Highest	Lowest
1	Coventry City FC	17,098	66.7%	30,289	8,876
2	Crystal Palace FC	14,854	-15.0%	21,958	9,146
3	Swindon Town FC	13,673	41.0%	23,418	7,625
4	Northampton Town FC	13,424	23.2%	18,717	7,845
5	Millwall FC	13,225	12.4%	21,996	5,621
6	Peterborough United FC	12,016	-3.0%	17,518	8,890
7	Bristol City FC	11,121	-10.6%	22,739	6,244
8	Wrexham AFC	10,137	-11.8%	18,841	4,337
9	Queens Park Rangers FC	10,041	-9.7%	18,281	3,261
10	Southend United FC	9,978	26.0%	14,372	6,858
11	Brighton & Hove Albion FC	9,961	-24.6%	16,354	2,333
12	Bristol Rovers FC	9,831	-18.7%	20,664	5,894
13	AFC Bournemouth	9,763	-16.0%	15,001	5,797
14	Watford FC	9,756	-8.0%	19,015	3,688
15	Port Vale FC	8,130	-9.6%	12,469	4,673
16	Reading FC	8,077	-28.2%	16,126	5,265
17	Bradford Park Avenue AFC	7,409	-16.5%	9,808	3,806
18	Hull City AFC	7,350	6.7%	9,831	4,145
19	Barnsley FC	7,021	15.1%	9,645	3,807
20	Notts County FC	6,860	-17.9%	14,320	3,455
21	Shrewsbury Town FC	5,897	-10.5%	8,593	3,833
22	Carlisle United FC	5,699	-14.5%	12,221	2,519
23	Colchester United FC	5,309	-0.6%	7,181	2,896
24	Halifax Town AFC	3,561	-23.8%	7,353	1,202

=== Division Four ===
No.	Club	Average	±	Highest	Lowest
1	Oldham Athletic FC	14,269	26.0%	23,747	8,434
2	Brentford FC	11,418	34.6%	15,820	8,340
3	Mansfield Town FC	9,848	35.6%	16,679	6,038
4	Tranmere Rovers	7,614	-5.8%	11,928	3,182
5	Oxford United FC	7,502	-	11,314	4,239
6	Gillingham FC	7,015	24.0%	11,503	4,300
7	Chesterfield FC	6,573	55.1%	12,993	3,014
8	Crewe Alexandra FC	6,436	18.6%	9,807	4,437
9	Doncaster Rovers FC	6,303	41.0%	12,762	3,406
10	Aldershot Town FC	5,573	-9.3%	8,660	2,995
11	Chester City FC	5,542	-0.6%	9,614	2,935
12	Torquay United FC	4,887	-1.9%	6,539	2,736
13	Lincoln City FC	4,630	-21.1%	10,265	1,993
14	York City FC	4,575	-30.6%	7,904	2,511
15	Newport County AFC	4,541	-9.6%	10,488	2,242
16	Exeter City FC	4,414	1.6%	9,678	2,742
17	Darlington FC	4,160	-25.7%	8,160	2,101
18	Barrow AFC	4,083	-8.2%	6,569	2,493
19	Stockport County FC	4,061	-15.8%	10,617	1,966
20	Bradford City AFC	4,015	-35.7%	7,735	1,733
21	Hartlepool United FC	3,910	-9.5%	8,690	2,028
22	Southport FC	3,416	-19.3%	5,289	1,799
23	Rochdale AFC	3,306	-17.9%	12,125	1,403
24	Workington AFC	2,852	-15.9%	5,427	1,181

== See also ==
- 1962-63 in English football
