= Tommy Docherty =

Scottish association footballer and manager (1928–2020)

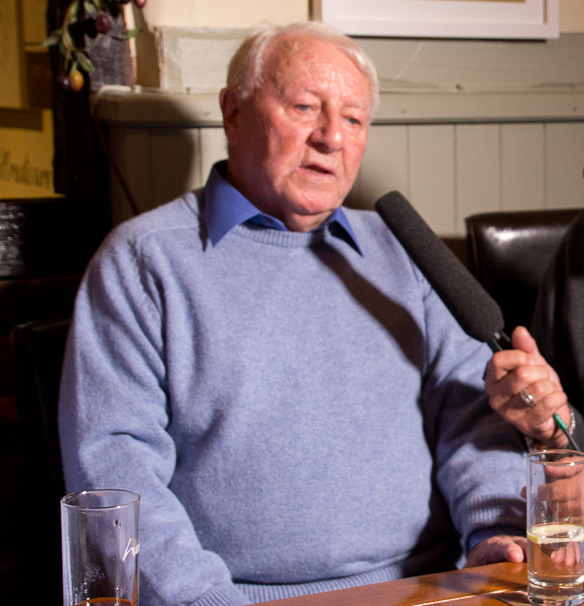
- Docherty in 2017

Personal information
- Full name: Thomas Henderson Docherty
- Date of birth: 24 April 1928
- Place of birth: Glasgow, Scotland
- Date of death: 31 December 2020 (aged 92)
- Place of death: Marple, England
- Position: Right half

Senior career*
Years	Team	Apps	(Gls)
- Shettleston
1947–1949	Celtic	9	(2)
1949–1958	Preston North End	324	(5)
1958–1961	Arsenal	83	(1)
1961–1962	Chelsea	4	(0)
Total		420	(8)

International career
1951–1959	Scotland	25	(1)
1952–1953	Scotland B	2	(0)
1955	Scotland A vs B trial	1	(0)
1958	SFA trial v SFL	1	(0)

Managerial career
- 1961–1967: Chelsea
- 1967–1968: Rotherham United
- 1968: Queens Park Rangers
- 1968–1970: Aston Villa
- 1970–1971: Porto
- 1971–1972: Scotland
- 1972–1977: Manchester United
- 1977–1979: Derby County
- 1979–1980: Queens Park Rangers
- 1981: Sydney Olympic
- 1981: Preston North End
- 1982–1983: South Melbourne
- 1983: Sydney Olympic
- 1984–1985: Wolverhampton Wanderers
- 1987–1988: Altrincham
- * Club domestic league appearances and goals

Thomas Henderson Docherty (24 April 1928 – 31 December 2020), commonly known as "The Doc", was a Scottish football player and manager. Docherty played for several clubs, most notably Preston North End, and represented Scotland 25 times between 1951 and 1959. He then managed a total of 13 clubs between 1961 and 1988, as well as the Scotland national team. Docherty was manager of Manchester United between 1972 and 1977, during which time the club was relegated to the Second Division but promoted back to the First Division as champion at the first attempt.

== Playing career ==
=== Club ===
Born in Shettleston Road in Glasgow's east end, Docherty began his playing career when he joined junior football club Shettleston. The turning point in his playing career came in 1946 when he was called up for national service in the Highland Light Infantry. While completing his national service, Docherty represented the British Army at football. On demobilisation, he was offered a contract with Celtic in 1947. Docherty later said that Jimmy Hogan, the club's coach, was his greatest influence.

In November 1949, after spending over two years with Celtic, he moved to England and joined Preston North End. With them he won the 1951 Second Division title and got to the 1954 FA Cup final. Altogether Docherty made close to 300 appearances for the club. He left Deepdale in August 1958 to join Arsenal for £28,000 (£570,000 today). With them he made 83 appearances, scoring once. He then went to play for Chelsea where he brought an end to his playing career in 1962.

=== International ===
At Preston, Docherty received the first of his 25 full Scotland international caps. His solitary goal came in a 7–2 defeat by England in 1955. He was part of the Scotland squads that played at the 1954 and 1958 FIFA World Cup finals which were held in Switzerland and Sweden, respectively.

== Managerial career ==
=== Chelsea ===
In February 1961, Docherty was offered the post of player-coach of Chelsea. Less than twelve months later, upon Ted Drake's departure and with the club facing relegation from the top flight, Docherty took over as manager. He was unable to keep the club in the First Division and the team was relegated at the end of the 1961–62 season.

During his first year in charge he sold many of the club's older players and brought in new ones such as Terry Venables, Bobby Tambling, Peter Bonetti and Barry Bridges. He also changed the club's home colours, switching from white shorts to blue shorts, the combination that remains. The team, nicknamed "Docherty's Diamonds", achieved promotion back to Division One in their first attempt and finished fifth the following year. In 1964–65, Chelsea won the League Cup in April with an aggregate win over Leicester City, but in the FA Cup were beaten 2–0 in the semi-final by eventual winners Liverpool. In that season the club finished third in the league which is the best performance since 1954–55, the season Chelsea won their first league title.

Docherty led Chelsea to the FA and the Inter-Cities Fairs Cup semi-finals a year later, before reaching the FA Cup final in 1967, which they lost to Tottenham Hotspur. He resigned in October 1967. The core of the team Docherty had put together, including Peter Osgood, Charlie Cooke, Ron Harris, Bonetti and John Hollins, went on to win the FA Cup and Cup Winners' Cup under Docherty's successor, Dave Sexton. A decade later Sexton succeeded Docherty as manager of Manchester United.

=== Rotherham, QPR, Aston Villa, Porto and Scotland ===
The month following his departure from Chelsea, Docherty became manager of Rotherham United. He said of his year there: "I promised I would take Rotherham out of the Second Division – and I took them into the Third. The old chairman said 'Doc, you're a man of your word!'"

He was then appointed manager at Queens Park Rangers, only to leave 29 days later after arguing with the club chairman over transfer policy. Docherty had wished to recruit Rotherham player, Brian Tiler, to his new team but chairman, John Gregory, baulked at Rotherham's £100,000 asking price prompting his manager to walk-out on Rangers.

Docherty then became new chairman, Doug Ellis's first appointment at Aston Villa in December 1968. Ellis managed to half the asking price and Tiler was installed as club captain in a team that had long since lost its way. Despite this, after 13 months, on 19 January 1970 with Aston Villa bottom of the Second Division, Docherty was sacked. Villa would go on to be relegated to the Third Division for the first and only time in the club's history in 1969–70.

From there he went to Porto, where he stayed for 16 months before resigning in May 1971, having failed to usurp Benfica and Sporting CP. On 2 July 1971, he was appointed by Hull City as assistant manager to Terry Neill, but on 12 September he left to become the caretaker manager of Scotland, with that position becoming permanent in November 1971. Scotland were on course to qualify for the 1974 World Cup under Docherty, having won both of their matches against Denmark in qualification Group 8. Docherty managed 12 Scotland games, the last of which was a 2–0 home win against the Danes in November 1972. He left the job a month later and was succeeded by Willie Ormond, who secured qualification for the World Cup by winning a home match against Czechoslovakia in September 1973.

=== Manchester United ===
In December 1972, Docherty attended a match that Manchester United lost 5-0 to Crystal Palace; in the Selhurst Park boardroom afterwards he was offered the Manchester United job by Matt Busby. His first game in charge of United was against Leeds United at Old Trafford. The game finished 1–1, with Ted MacDougall scoring one of his few goals for United. Although United were in serious trouble when he took them over, because of an ageing squad, he managed to keep them in the First Division in 1972–73. The 1973–74 season saw United continue to struggle and they were eventually relegated to the Second Division.

In the following season, United returned to the top flight as Second Division champions. In 1975–76 they finished in third place in the First Division and also reached the 1976 FA Cup final, but lost 1–0 to Southampton who were then in the Second Division. Docherty led United to the FA Cup final again in 1977, this time as underdogs, beating league and soon-to-be European champions Liverpool 2–1.

Shortly afterwards news that Docherty was having an extramarital affair with Mary Brown, the wife of a United physiotherapist, became public. He was sacked in a blaze of publicity in July 1977 and replaced at Old Trafford by Sexton, the same man who had followed him into the manager's office at Chelsea. The affair also resulted in the end of his marriage to Agnes, who had been his wife since December 1949. In 1988, Docherty married Mary, and the couple remained together until his death in 2020. After his sacking, Docherty had a frosty relationship with the club.

=== Later career ===
Docherty became manager at Derby County in September 1977, where he stayed for two seasons before resigning in May 1979. His next appointment was at Queens Park Rangers in May 1979. When he took over at Loftus Road, Rangers had been relegated to the Second Division (three years after almost winning the league title) and he had to lift the team's spirits to start the new season. QPR finished the season four points short of promotion to the First Division. In May 1980, Docherty was sacked by chairman Jim Gregory, then reinstated after just nine days away. In October 1980, he was sacked for the second time in five months.

This was followed by a short spell in Australia coaching Sydney Olympic in 1981. He returned to England in July that year to manage Preston North End, where he had spent nine years as a player. He left after a few months, returning to Australia to manage South Melbourne until the following year. He also managed Sydney Olympic again in 1983.

=== Wolverhampton Wanderers ===
Docherty returned to England once more with Wolverhampton Wanderers just after their relegation from the First Division in 1984. He was sacked just over a year later, however, when Wolves had suffered a second successive relegation, eventually going on to suffer a third relegation in a row the season after Docherty's departure.

Docherty's time at Wolves was to be a tough task. The club had been three-time champion of England in the 1950s and had also hosted Budapest Honvéd FC under the floodlights at the Molineux Stadium in 1954, pioneering the way for European club football. They had since gone on to be a finalist in the 1972 UEFA Cup and the winner of the 1980 League Cup, in the final of which Andy Gray scored the winning goal after setting a British transfer record when signing for the club.

The club Docherty was taking over as Manager was far away from the historic club Wolves had once been with the chairman in 1978 bankrupting the club with the rebuilding of the Molineux Street stand. A rescue package had to be brought in place during 1982, with the club just hours away from going out of business it was purchased by the Bhatti brothers, two Saudi Arabian businessmen with help from club legend Derek Dougan.

The brothers were property developers and wanted to develop the land around the stadium but when the council did not grant them permissions they sought to build a supermarket adjacent to the Molineux stadium. Relationship with the club soured and the club was receiving no investment and involvement from the brothers.

Following relegation from the top flight the previous season, several key players left the club, including goalscorers Mel Eaves and Wayne Clarke, as well as Tony Towner and second–highest club appearance holder Kenny Hibbitt.

"Tommy Docherty came in as manager and he knew I didn't want to be around to see the club in such dire straits", commented Hibbitt when interviewed on his thoughts on leaving Wolves.

Docherty also had problems leading into the season with first-choice goalkeeper John Burridge, who was making demands of the club. Instead of meeting these, Docherty promoted 17-year-old academy player Tim Flowers into goal, where he remained for the season; Burridge left the club.

The 1984-85 season began at home to Sheffield United in front 14,908 fans. After a good start to the season, later progress started to slowly disintegrated and the club found themselves bouncing around position 13th - 15th position in the table by November.

Wolves were misfiring but despite this, Docherty allowed defender Geoff Palmer, having played 394 times for the club, to move to Burnley. Palmer was a very experienced defender and with him leaving, this left a far less experienced team to that which had finished the previous season. Palmer left the club believing he had fallen out if favour with Docherty and cited that "the club just wasn't a nice place to be at the time, it wasn't being run properly, and was on its knees."

Shortly afterwards, Wolves endured a 21-match winless run in all competitions (19 of those in the Second Division). Pressure was mounting in January 1985 and former fan favourite and now Chairman Derek Dougan eventually resigned from his position on the board.

The season performances also saw the club beaten 5–1 on three occasions. Two were televised live on ITV and the other away at Brighton & Hove Albion on the day the club was officially relegated. Docherty's final game at home was against Huddersfield Town, where Wolves secured just their eighth victory of the season in front of only 4,422 fans. Wolves finished the season bottom of the table and Docherty left the club in July 1985.

When asked about his time at Wolves Docherty said: "I could hardly say 'no' when a club as famous as that came in for me... But it was a hopeless task really. There was no money. I wasn't sure I'd be able to work with Derek Dougan but I accepted the challenge anyway. As for the Bhattis, I only met them twice – once when they hired me and once when they fired me".

Docherty took up his final managerial position at Altrincham. He retired from management at the end of the 1987–88 season.

== Personal life ==
Docherty married his first wife, Agnes, in December 1949, after he left his native Scotland to sign for Preston North End. They were married for 27 years until Docherty announced his affair with Mary Brown in 1977. Docherty and Agnes had four children together: Mick (himself a former professional footballer and manager), Thomas Jr., Catherine and Peter. After marrying Mary Brown, he had two more children – daughters Grace and Lucy – who were born during the 1980s. Agnes died in September 2002 at the age of 73. In 2008, Tommy Docherty Jr. released a book, Married to a Man of Two Halves, which was based on memoirs and newspaper cuttings which he had discovered when clearing out his mother's house after her death.

Tommy Docherty died on 31 December 2020, aged 92, following a long illness.

== Honours ==
=== Player ===
Preston North End

- Football League Second Division: 1950–51
- FA Cup runner-up: 1953–54

=== Manager ===
Chelsea

- Football League Cup: 1964–65
- FA Cup runner-up: 1966–67

Manchester United

- Football League Second Division: 1974–75
- FA Cup: 1976–77; runner-up: 1975–76

Scotland

- British Home Championship: 1971–72 (shared)

=== Individual ===
- Scottish Football Hall of Fame: 2013

== See also ==
- List of Scotland national football team captains
- List of Scottish football families
