= Brian Mears =

English footballer

- Born: 25 April 1931; Richmond, United Kingdom
- Died: 29 July 2009 (aged 78)
- Education: Malvern College
- Occupation: Businessman
- Notable work: Chairman of Chelsea F.C.
- Children: 2

Joseph Brian Mears (25 April 1931 – 28 July 2009) was the chairman of Chelsea Football Club. He was the son of Joe Mears, also a chairman of Chelsea, and grandson of Joseph Mears, co-founder of the club. He was born in Richmond, Surrey, and educated at Malvern College. In 1950 he emigrated to Canada and began working life in a seed factory. He returned to the United Kingdom shortly afterwards and did his national service as a radio operator in the Royal Air Force.

Brian Mears took over as chairman following the death of Len Withey in 1969 and presided over the club's successful period in the early 1970s, when the FA Cup and Cup Winners' Cup were won in consecutive seasons. He remained in the position until 1981, when a boardroom coup d'etat led by Viscount Chelsea saw him removed with the club in a dire position both on and off the pitch, mainly a result of the disastrous attempt to redevelop Stamford Bridge during the 1970s. He sold the club to Ken Bates a year later for a nominal sum of £1. Mears came under fire when his shares in the Stamford Bridge freehold were later sold to property developers Marler Estates; he insisted that it was his wife who controlled the shares.

After leaving Chelsea, Mears relocated to the United States, where he was involved with several North American soccer teams and ran a car dealership in Long Beach, California. He wrote several books on Chelsea. Despite befriending Chelsea director Matthew Harding and chairman Bruce Buck in later years, he never set foot in Stamford Bridge again.

Mears married June Ware in 1955 and they had two children: a son, Christopher; and a daughter, Suzanne. Through Suzanne, Mears was the father-in-law to former footballer Steve Wicks and grandfather to Wicks' son Matt.

Mears died of heart failure on 28 July 2009.

Sporting positions
Preceded by Len Withey	Chelsea chairman 1969–1981	Succeeded by Viscount Chelsea
