= Pat Jennings =

Northern Irish footballer

Pat Jennings CBE
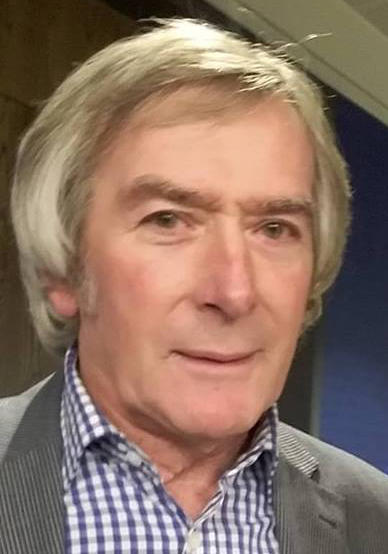
- Jennings in 2018

Personal information
- Full name: Patrick Anthony Jennings
- Date of birth: 12 June 1945 (age 81)
- Place of birth: Newry, Northern Ireland
- Height: 1.83 m (6 ft 0 in)
- Position: Goalkeeper

Youth career
- 1956: Shamrock Rovers (Newry)
- 1961–1963: Newry Town

Senior career*
Years	Team	Apps	(Gls)
1963–1964	Watford	48	(0)
1964–1977	Tottenham Hotspur	472	(0)
1977–1985	Arsenal	237	(0)
1985–1986	Tottenham Hotspur	0	(0)
1986	Everton	0	(0)
Total		757	(0)

International career
1964–1986	Northern Ireland	119	(0)
- * Club domestic league appearances and goals

Patrick Anthony Jennings (born 12 June 1945) is a Northern Irish former professional footballer who played as a goalkeeper. He is widely recognised as one of the greatest goalkeepers in the history of the sport and was nominated for the Ballon d'Or in 1973, 1975 and 1985.

He played 119 international matches for Northern Ireland in an international career which lasted for over 22 years. During his career, Jennings played for Newry Town, Watford and in the top division with Tottenham Hotspur and Arsenal, winning the FA Cup with both of the north London rivals. In total, Jennings made over 1,150 competitive appearances (the first Northern Irish to achieve the feat, since the time matches are recorded), and despite being a goalkeeper, he scored from play in the 1967 FA Charity Shield.

== Club career ==
=== Newry Town & Watford ===
After playing for a local under-18 side in Newry at the age of 11 (named Shamrock Rovers, not to be confused with the Dublin club of the same name), Jennings concentrated on Gaelic football until he was sixteen years old, when he made his football comeback with his hometown side Newry Town. After impressing with the team he moved to English Third Division side Watford in May 1963. Jennings again impressed in his first season in England, playing every league game for his club, and making two international appearances that season. He was signed by Tottenham Hotspur for £27,000 in June 1964.

=== Tottenham Hotspur ===
Jennings spent thirteen years at White Hart Lane, where he played in 472 league games for Spurs, and 591 in all competitions. He won the FA Cup in 1967, the League Cup in 1971 and 1973, and the UEFA Cup in it first season in 1972. He also scored once, in the 1967 FA Charity Shield, from his own area, kicking the ball from his hands and sending a large punt down the field that bounced over Manchester United goalkeeper Alex Stepney and into the net. In 1973 the Football Writers' Association named him as its footballer of the year. Three years later he won PFA's version of the award – he was the first goalkeeper to receive this accolade, and until 2025 remains only one of two, along with Peter Shilton.

=== Arsenal ===
On 6 August 1977, he was transferred to Tottenham's arch-rivals, Arsenal, with Tottenham, who had just been relegated, thinking he was nearing the end of his career. However, Jennings saw off rivals for the goalkeeper's jersey to play for Arsenal for another eight years. Whilst at Highbury, he helped Arsenal to four Cup finals in three successive years; the FA Cup final in 1978, 1979, and 1980, as well as the European Cup Winners Cup final that year. However, Arsenal only managed to win the second of these finals, a 3–2 victory against Manchester United. In total, Jennings made 327 appearances for Arsenal, 237 of them in the League, between 1977 and his eventual retirement from first-team club football in 1985. On 26 February 1983, he became the first player in English football to make 1,000 senior appearances, celebrating this milestone with a clean sheet in a goalless league draw for Arsenal at West Bromwich Albion. Jennings played his final game in the league for Arsenal against Sheffield Wednesday on 25 November 1984, and he was eventually replaced by John Lukic as the first choice keeper. A farewell match for Jennings was played against Tottenham Hotspur 8 May 1985 at Highbury.

=== Later career ===
After his retirement, Jennings returned to Tottenham Hotspur, playing mostly in their reserve side to maintain his match sharpness for Northern Ireland's 1986 World Cup campaign. His final appearance for Tottenham was in the Football League Super Cup against Liverpool in January 1986. He was also briefly on Everton's books, having been signed as goalkeeping cover for the 1986 FA Cup final against Liverpool after Neville Southall was injured playing for Wales.

== International career ==
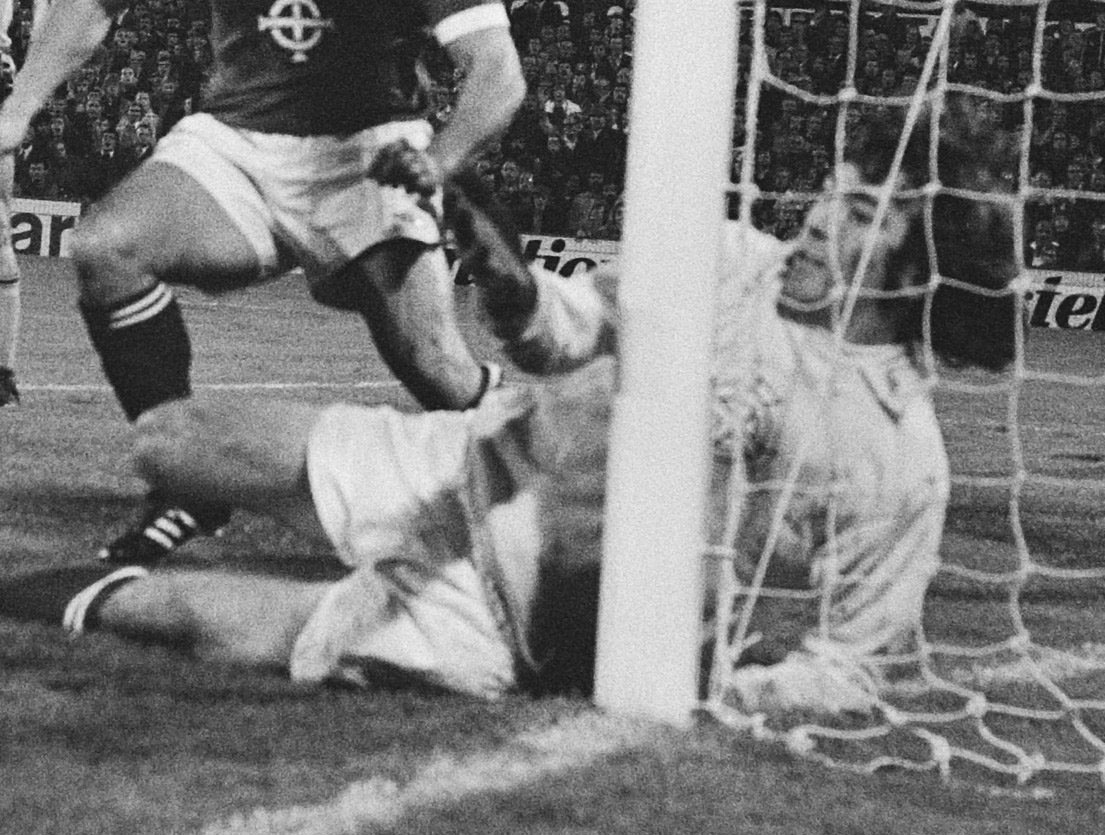
Jennings defending his goal against the Netherlands (1976)

On 15 April 1964, whilst playing for Watford, Jennings made his Northern Ireland debut in a British Home Championship match against Wales. Northern Ireland won the game 3–2, with George Best also making his international debut. Jennings made four appearances in Northern Ireland's best-ever performance at the 1982 World Cup, conceding only one goal in the three first group stage games — including a 1–0 victory with ten men against hosts Spain — before letting four past him against eventual group D winners France in the second group stage games.

Despite retiring from club football in 1985, Jennings played his final international game at the 1986 FIFA World Cup on his 41st birthday, making him the World Cup's oldest-ever participant until Roger Milla broke his record at 42 in 1994, who also had his record broken by Faryd Mondragón at 43 years in 2014 and Essam El Hadary at 45 years in 2018, the latter two goalkeepers, like Jennings. The match was Northern Ireland's final group game, a 3–0 defeat against Brazil. In total, Jennings participated in the qualifying stages of six World Cups between 1966 and 1986.

== Retirement ==
Following his retirement Jennings has worked as a goalkeeping coach. He has worked at Tottenham in this capacity since 1993. In 2003 Jennings was inducted into the English Football Hall of Fame in recognition of the skills he demonstrated in the English league. His son, also named Pat, is also a goalkeeper, having played for League of Ireland clubs University College Dublin, Derry City, Shamrock Rovers and NIFL Premiership club Glenavon.

Jennings and his family have lived for many years in Broxbourne, Hertfordshire, where his son attended The Broxbourne School along with the sons of fellow Spurs players Chris Hughton, Osvaldo Ardiles and Ray Clemence. He is still associated with Spurs and hosts Corporate Hospitality fans in the Pat Jennings Lounges at White Hart Lane and Windsor Park, Belfast.

== Personal life ==
Jennings married Eleanor Toner, a singer from Newry, in 1967. They have four children: Mairead, Siobhan, Ciara and Patrick Junior, a goalkeeper. Jennings is Catholic.

== Honours ==
Jennings was appointed Member of the Order of the British Empire (MBE) for services to association football in the 1976 Birthday Honours; he was promoted to Officer of the same Order (OBE) in the 1987 New Year Honours for services to football, particularly in Northern Ireland, and promoted further to Commander of the Order of the British Empire (CBE) in the 2023 New Year Honours for services to association football and charity. On 8 November 2023, Jennings unveiled a statue in his honour in Kildare Street, Newry.

Tottenham Hotspur

- FA Cup: 1966–67
- Football League Cup: 1970–71, 1972–73
- FA Charity Shield: 1967
- UEFA Cup: 1971–72

Arsenal

- FA Cup: 1978–79; runner-up: 1977–78, 1979–80

Northern Ireland

- British Home Championship: 1979–80, 1983–84

Individual

- Rothman's Golden Boots Awards: 1973, 1974
- FWA Footballer of the Year: 1972–73
- Ballon d'Or nominee: 1973, 1975, 1985
- PFA Players' Player of the Year: 1975–76
- PFA Team of the Year: 1973–74 First Division, 1975–76 First Division
- World XI: 1973
- FWA Tribute Award: 1986
- Football League 100 Legends: 1998
- English Football Hall of Fame: 2003

== See also ==
- List of men's footballers with 1,000 or more official appearances
- List of men's footballers with 100 or more international caps

World Cup records
Preceded by Dino Zoff; 40	Oldest Player; 41; 12 June 1986 – 28 June 1994	Succeeded by Roger Milla; 42
Preceded by Dino Zoff; 40	Oldest Goalkeeper; 41; 12 June 1986 – 24 June 2014	Succeeded by Faryd Mondragón; 43
