= Frank Saul =

Frank Saul may refer to:

- Frank Saul (basketball) (1924–2019), American National Basketball Association player
- Frank Saul (footballer) (born 1943), English former footballer
