= Allan Harris =

English footballer (1942–2017)

Personal information
- Date of birth: 28 December 1942
- Place of birth: London, England
- Date of death: 23 November 2017 (aged 74)
- Position: Defender

Youth career
- Chelsea

Senior career*
Years	Team	Apps	(Gls)
1960–1964	Chelsea	70	(0)
1964–1966	Coventry City	60	(0)
1966–1967	Chelsea	14	(0)
1967–1971	Queens Park Rangers	94	(0)
1971–1973	Plymouth Argyle	64	(0)
1973–1974	Cambridge United	6	(0)
1974–1975	Hayes	13	(0)
1976	St Patrick's Athletic	7	(0)
Total		328	(0)

Managerial career
- 1984–1986: Barcelona (assistant)
- 1993–1995: Al Ahly
- 1995: Karşıyaka
- 2000–2004: Malaysia
- * Club domestic league appearances and goals

Allan Harris (28 December 1942 – 23 November 2017) was an English football player and manager. He played for Chelsea, Coventry City and Queens Park Rangers as a defender. His brother Ron was also a professional footballer.

Harris was a full-back and began his career with Chelsea, for whom he played 70 league games in his first stint with the club. He joined Coventry in 1964, spending two years there, before briefly returning to Chelsea again, where he played in their 1967 FA Cup final loss to Tottenham Hotspur.

He moved to Queens Park Rangers as a replacement for Jim Langley in 1967, and made his debut in August that year against Portsmouth. Harris was a member of the 1967–68 side that won promotion to the First Division for the first time in the club's history.

He played 94 league games for QPR before transferring to Plymouth Argyle in 1971, and later played for Cambridge United. He then joined non-league Hayes as player-manager in 1974, remaining until his dismissal in March 1975. He signed for St Patrick's Athletic in February 1976, along with Terry Venables, and made his debut on 22 February that year.

After retiring from playing, Harris went on to be assistant manager to Venables at Crystal Palace, QPR (helping the team reach the FA Cup Final in 1982 and win promotion to the First Division in 1982–83), FC Barcelona (winning La Liga in 1984–85 and reaching the 1986 European Cup Final), and Tottenham Hotspur from 1987.

He also led Egyptian side Al Ahly to the African Cup as Champions from 1993 to 1995 and was the coach of the Malaysian national team from December 2000 to 2004.

Harris died on 23 November 2017 at the age of 74.

== Honours ==
Chelsea

- FA Cup runner-up: 1966–67
