= 1975 Ballon d'Or =

Annual association football award event in France

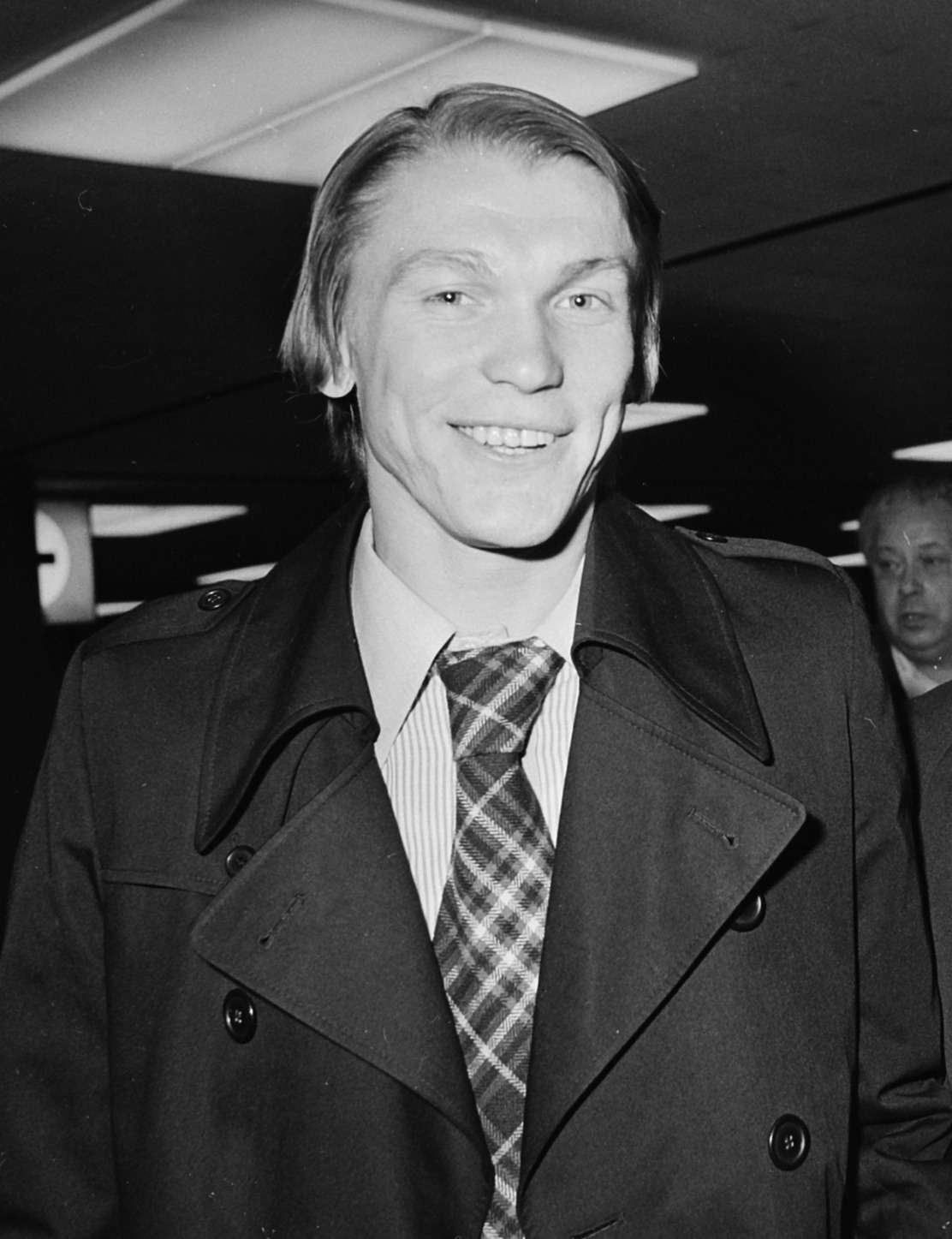
- 1975 Ballon d'Or winner, Oleg Blokhin in 1977
- Date: 30 December 1975
- Presented by: France Football

Highlights
- Won by: (Soviet Union) Oleg Blokhin (1st award)
- Website: ballondor.com

The 1975 Ballon d'Or, given to the best football player in Europe as judged by a panel of sports journalists from UEFA member countries, was awarded to the Soviet forward Oleg Blokhin on 30 December 1975. There were 26 voters, from Austria, Belgium, Bulgaria, Czechoslovakia, Denmark, East Germany, England, Finland, France, Greece, Hungary, Italy, Luxembourg, the Netherlands, Norway, Poland, Portugal, Republic of Ireland, Romania, Soviet Union, Spain, Sweden, Switzerland, Turkey, West Germany and Yugoslavia. Blokhin became the second Soviet (and the first Ukrainian) footballer who won the trophy after Lev Yashin (1963).

== Rankings ==
Rank	Name	Club(s)	Nationality	Points
1	Oleg Blokhin	(Soviet Union) Dynamo Kyiv	Soviet Union	122
2	Franz Beckenbauer	(West Germany) Bayern Munich	West Germany	42
3	Johan Cruyff	(Spain) Barcelona	Netherlands	27
4	Berti Vogts	(West Germany) Borussia Mönchengladbach	West Germany	25
5	Sepp Maier	(West Germany) Bayern Munich	West Germany	20
6	Ruud Geels	(Netherlands) Ajax	Netherlands	18
7	Jupp Heynckes	(West Germany) Borussia Mönchengladbach	West Germany	17
8	Paul Breitner	(Spain) Real Madrid	West Germany	14
9	Colin Todd	(England) Derby County	England	12
10	Dudu Georgescu	(Romania) Dinamo București	Romania	11
11	Peter Lorimer	(England) Leeds United	Scotland	9
11	Branko Oblak	(West Germany) Schalke 04	Yugoslavia	9
11	Pirri	(Spain) Real Madrid	Spain	9
14	Ralf Edström	(Netherlands) PSV Eindhoven	Sweden	6
14	Günter Netzer	(Spain) Real Madrid	West Germany	6
14	Dino Zoff	(Italy) Juventus	Italy	6
17	Hristo Bonev	(Bulgaria) Lokomotiv Plovdiv	Bulgaria	4
17	Josip Katalinski	(France) Nice	Yugoslavia	4
17	Grzegorz Lato	(Poland) Stal Mielec	Poland	4
17	Gerd Müller	(West Germany) Bayern Munich	West Germany	4
17	Ivo Viktor	(Czechoslovakia) Dukla Prague	Czechoslovakia	4
22	Ján Pivarník	(Czechoslovakia) Slovan Bratislava	Czechoslovakia	3
23	Leonid Buryak	(Soviet Union) Dynamo Kyiv	Soviet Union	2
23	Jürgen Croy	(East Germany) Sachsenring Zwickau	East Germany	2
23	Johan Neeskens	(Spain) Barcelona	Netherlands	2
23	Jean-Marc Guillou	(France) Nice	France	2
27	João Alves	(Portugal) Boavista	Portugal	1
27	Dragan Džajić	(France) Bastia	Yugoslavia	1
27	Giacinto Facchetti	(Italy) Internazionale	Italy	1
27	Don Givens	(England) Queens Park Rangers	Republic of Ireland	1
27	Pat Jennings	(England) Tottenham Hotspur	Northern Ireland	1
27	Allan Simonsen	(West Germany) Borussia Mönchengladbach	Denmark	1
