= 1978 Soviet Cup =

1978 Cup of USSR in Football
Кубок СССР

Tournament details
- Country: Soviet Union
- Dates: March 3 – August 12
- Teams: 48

Final positions
- Champions: Dinamo Kiev
- Runners-up: Shakhter Donetsk

The 1978 Soviet Cup was an association football cup competition of the Soviet Union. The winner of the competition, Dinamo Kiev qualified for the continental tournament.

== Participating teams ==
Enter in Second round	Enter in First round	
Vysshaya Liga 16/16 teams	Pervaya Liga 20/20 teams	Vtoraya Liga 12/139 teams
✓ Dinamo Kiev; ✓ Dinamo Tbilisi; ✓ Torpedo Moscow; ✓ Dinamo Moscow; ✓ Shakhter Donetsk; ✓ Lokomotiv Moscow; ✓ Chernomorets Odessa; ✓ Kairat Alma-Ata; ✓ Zaria Voroshilovgrad; ✓ Zenit Leningrad; ✓ Ararat Yerevan; ✓ Dnepr Dnepropetrovsk; ✓ Neftchi Baku; ✓ CSKA Moscow; ✓ Spartak Moscow; ✓ Pakhtakor Tashkent	✓ Karpaty Lvov; ✓ Krylya Sovetov Kuibyshev; ✓ Tavriya Simferopol; ✓ Dinamo Minsk; ✓ Pamir Dushanbe; ✓ Kuzbass Kemerovo; ✓ Terek Grozny; ✓ Shinnik Yaroslavl; ✓ Torpedo Kutaisi; ✓ SKA Rostov-na-Donu; ✓ Nistru Kishinev; ✓ Uralmash Sverdlovsk; ✓ Dinamo Leningrad; ✓ Spartak Ivano-Frankovsk; ✓ Spartak Ordzhonikidze; ✓ Metallurg Zaporozhye; ✓ Kolkhozchi Ashgabat; ✓ Kuban Krasnodar; ✓ Zhalgiris Vilnius; ✓ SKA Odessa	✓ Spartak Nalchik; ✓ Yangier; ✓ Kolos Nikopol; ✓ Shirak Leninakan; ✓ SKA Khabarovsk; ✓ Alga Frunze; ✓ SKA Kiev; ✓ Daugava Riga; ✓ Spartak Semipalatinsk; ✓ Spartak Ryazan; ✓ Fakel Voronezh; ✓ Iskra Smolensk

Source: []

== Competition schedule ==
=== First round ===
[Mar 3, 7] 
Žalgiris Vilnius          0-0  0-1  TEREK Grozny 
  [1. Att: 500 (in Sochi)] 
  [2. Anzor Chikhladze. Att: 800 (in Adler)] 
[Mar 4, 8] 
SKA Rostov-na-Donu        1-0  0-0  Spartak Nalchik 
  [1. Yuriy Bobkov 50. Att: 1,000 (in Sochi)] 
  [2. Att: 1,000 (in Adler)] 
[Mar 4, 11] 
Dinamo Minsk              0-1  1-2  SPARTAK Orjonikidze 
  [1. Gennadiy Kravchenko 49 pen. (in Sochi)] 
  [2. Viktor Yanushevskiy 76 – Nugzar Chitauri 40, Igor Zazroyev 56. Att: 500 (in Sukhumi)] 
KRYLYA SOVETOV Kuibyshev  1-0  0-0  Yangiyer 
  [1. Vladimir Kuznetsov. Att: 4,000 (in Samarkand)] 
  [2. Att: 7,500] 
Kuban Krasnodar           0-1  0-1  SHINNIK Yaroslavl 
  [1. Leonid Zyuzin. (in Adler)] 
  [2. Yuriy Panteleyev (in Sochi)] 
Kuzbass Kemerovo          0-0  0-1  SKA Odessa 
  [1. Att: 8,000 (in Sukhumi)] 
  [2. Vladimir Maly 25. Att: 14,000] 
Metallurg Zaporozhye      0-1  0-0  KOLOS Nikopol 
  [1. Viktor Bulba. Att: 7,000] 
  [2. Att: 10,000] 
SHIRAK Leninakan          1-0  2-2  Kolhozchi Ashkhabad 
  [1. Andranik Adamyan. Att: 15,000 (in Yerevan)] 
  [2. Andranik Adamyan, Albert Akimyan – Anatoliy Bogdanov, Viktor Grachov. Att: 3,000] 
SKA Khabarovsk            0-0  0-2  NISTRU Kishinev 
  [1. Att: 3,500 (in Drokia)] 
  [2. Valeriy Pavlov, Gennadiy Ryutin (S) og. Att: 5,500] 
SPARTAK Ivano-Frankovsk   4-1  1-1  Alga Frunze 
  [1. Nikolai Pristai, Yuriy Podpalyuk, Igor Dyriv, Yaroslav Kikot pen – Alexandr Kantsurov. Att: 9,000] 
  [2. Vladimir Mukomelov – Alexandr Kantsurov. Att: 10,000 (in Osh)] 
Tavria Simferopol         1-1  1-2  SKA Kiev              [aet] 
  [1. Yuriy Ajem 58 pen – Anatoliy Kudya 38. Att: 18,000] 
  [2. Andrei Cheremisin 27 – Viktor Nastashevskiy 43, Yuriy Smirnov 102. Att: 3,000 (in Uzhgorod)] 
Torpedo Kutaisi           2-0  0-2  URALMASH Sverdlovsk   [pen 3-5] 
  [1. Revaz Burkadze-2. Att: 15,000] 
  [2. Nikolai Aboburko, Vladimir Kalashnikov. Att: 500 (in Fergana)] 
[Mar 4, 14] 
Daugava Riga              1-3  1-1  PAMIR Dushanbe 
  [1. Yuriy Sidorenko – Valeriy Tursunov, Edgar Gess, Alexandr Tarbayev. Att: 2,500 (in Sevastopol)] 
  [2. Mikhail Smorodin – Valeriy Tursunov. Att: 6,000] 
[Mar 5, 11] 
Spartak Semipalatinsk     0-0  1-2  SPARTAK Ryazan 
  [1. Att: 50 (in Tashkent Region)] 
  [2. Andrei Pinchukov – Anatoliy Andreyev, Alexandr Korobkov. Att: 100 (in Tashkent Region)] 
[Mar 5, 12] 
FAKEL Voronezh            0-0  1-1  Iskra Smolensk 
  [1. Att: 1,500 (in Sochi)] 
  [2. Viktor Proskurin 85 – Vyacheslav Murashkintsev 37. Att: 3,000 (in Sevastopol)] 
[Mar 10, 14] 
Dinamo Leningrad          0-1  0-3  KARPATY Lvov 
  [1. Vladimir Danilyuk. Att: 2,000] 
  [2. Fyodor Chorba, Stepan Yurchishin, Vladimir Danilyuk. Att: 15,000]

=== Second round ===
[Mar 16, Apr 1] 
TORPEDO Moskva            0-0  1-0  UralMash Sverdlovsk 
  [1. (in Adler)] 
  [2. Vladimir Yurin 72. Att: 7,000 (in Fergana)] 
[Mar 18, 24] 
ARARAT Yerevan            5-0  0-1  Spartak Orjonikidze 
  [1. Robert Khalaijan 5, 41, Armen Azaryan 6, Andranik Khachatryan 55, Edik Arutyunyan 69] 
  [2. Givi Kerashvili 65. Att: 18,000] 
KAYRAT Alma-Ata           0-0  1-1  Fakel Voronezh 
  [1. Att: 15,000 (in Chimkent)] 
  [2. Alexandr A.Vasin 80 – Anatoliy Ionkin 26. Att: 1,000 (in Sochi)] 
Kolos Nikopol             1-1  1-2  DINAMO Tbilisi 
  [1. Pyotr Naida 36 pen – David Kipiani 32. Att: 20,000] 
  [2. Valentin Prilepskiy 47 – Alexandr Chivadze 64, 86] 
Krylya Sovetov Kuibyshev  1-2  0-2  SHAKHTYOR Donetsk 
  [1. Nikolai Pavlov 36 – Nikolai Latysh 70 pen, Vitaliy Starukhin 76. (in Sochi)] 
  [2. Vladimir Rogovskiy 14, Nikolai Latysh 49. Att: 15,000] 
LOKOMOTIV Moskva          3-0  1-0  Terek Grozny 
  [1. Valeriy Petrakov 36, Grigoriy Sapozhnikov 72, Vladimir Shevchuk 74. (in Sochi)] 
  [2. Valeriy Gazzayev 73] 
NEFTCHI Baku              1-0  1-0  Shinnik Yaroslavl 
  [1. Anatoliy Banishevskiy 73] 
  [2. Asif Aliyev 24. (in Adler)] 
ZARYA Voroshilovgrad      0-0  2-0  Shirak Leninakan 
  [2. Alexandr Polukarov 8, Yuriy Rabochiy 67. Att: 13,000] 
ZENIT Leningrad           1-1  1-0  Karpaty Lvov 
  [1. Vladimir Klementyev 16 – Grigoriy Batich 69. Att: 2,000] 
  [2. Andrei Redkous 57. Att: 32,000] 
[Mar 18, 25] 
CHERNOMORETS Odessa       2-0  0-2  SKA Rostov-na-Donu    [pen 4-3] 
  [1. Teimuraz Esebua 5, Vyacheslav Leshchuk 75] 
  [2. Valeriy Berezin 3, Vladimir Goncharov 44. Att: 8,000] 
Dnepr Dnepropetrovsk      1-1  1-2  SKA Odessa 
  [1. Nikolai Samoilenko 87 – Vladimir Maly 49] 
  [2. Vladimir Troshkin 80 – Igor Ivanenko 8, Leonid Maly 64 pen. Att: 18,000] 
Nistru Kishinev           0-1  0-2  SPARTAK Moskva 
  [1. Valeriy Gladilin 48. Att: 20,000] 
  [2. Vadim Pavlenko 28, Yuriy Gavrilov 29. Att: 3,000 (in Sochi)] 
[Mar 18, 26] 
CSKA Moskva               1-1  2-0  Spartak Ivano-Frankovsk 
  [1. Leonid Nikolayenko 54 – Igor Dyriv 58. (in Sukhumi)] 
  [2. Alexandr Pogorelov 11, Alexandr Kolpovskiy 72. Att: 11,000] 
[Mar 18, Apr 3] 
Pamir Dushanbe            0-2  0-0  DINAMO Moskva 
  [1. Andrei Yakubik 39, Alexandr Maksimenkov 68. Att: 15,000] 
  [2. Att: 15,000 (in Sochi)] 
[Mar 19, 24] 
Spartak Ryazan            0-3  1-3  DINAMO Kiev 
  [1. Oleg Blokhin 24, Vladimir Onishchenko 49, Leonid Buryak 57. Att: 2,500 (in Sochi)] 
  [2. Anatoliy Andreyev 30 – Alexandr Hapsalis 10, Yuriy Tsymbalyuk 34, Alexandr Boiko 89. Att: 5,000 (in Simferopol)] 
[Mar 27, 30] 
PAHTAKOR Tashkent         2-0  3-2  SKA Kiev      [both legs in Tashkent] 
  [1. Vladimir Fyodorov 27, Konstantin Bakanov 83. Att: 22,000] 
  [2. Viktor Churkin 22, Konstantin Bakanov 42, Vladimir Makarov 89 pen – Mikhail Palamarchuk 7, Vladimir Nastashevskiy 71. Att: 14,000]

=== Third round ===
[Apr 1, 16] 
Chernomorets Odessa       2-1  0-4  DINAMO Kiev 
  [1. Teimuraz Esebua 20, Vladimir Ploskina 65 – Viktor Kolotov 75. Att: 15,000] 
  [2. Leonid Buryak 4, 68 pen, Oleg Blokhin 42, Mikhail Fomenko 90. Att: 30,000] 
Kayrat Alma-Ata           1-1  0-0  ZENIT Leningrad 
  [1. Vladimir Nikitenko 71 – Anatoliy Davydov 33. Att: 19,000] 
  [2. Att: 2,000] 
NEFTCHI Baku              4-0  0-3  SKA Odessa 
  [1. Anatoliy Banishevskiy 70, 73, Nikolai Smolnikov 89, Elbrus Abbasov 90. Att: 15,000] 
  [2. Leonid Maly 35, Vladimir Maly 43, 57. Att: 14,000] 
SHAKHTYOR Donetsk         3-0  2-0  Ararat Yerevan 
  [1. Vitaliy Starukhin 8, Valeriy Yaremchenko 39, Vladimir Safonov 80. Att: 40,000] 
  [2. Mikhail Sokolovskiy 72, Yuriy Reznik 77. Att: 6,000] 
Spartak Moskva            0-0  0-1  LOKOMOTIV Moskva 
  [1. Att: 3,500 (in Sochi)] 
  [2. Valeriy Gazzayev 64. Att: 28,000] 
[Apr 2, 16] 
DINAMO Tbilisi            1-0  1-0  Pahtakor Tashkent 
  [1. Revaz Chelebadze 62. Att: 50,000] 
  [2. Ramaz Shengelia 24. Att: 20,000] 
[Apr 16, 19] 
DINAMO Moskva             2-1  1-1  CSKA Moskva    [both legs in Podolsk] 
  [1. Alexandr Makhovikov 2, Zurab Tsereteli 7 – Yuriy Chesnokov 62. Att: 18,000] 
  [2. Mikhail Gershkovich 7 – Yuriy Chesnokov 12 pen. Att: 20,000] 
[Apr 16, May 12] 
Zarya Voroshilovgrad      0-0  1-3  TORPEDO Moskva 
  [1. Att: 13,000] 
  [2. Anatoliy Olenev 51 – Yevgeniy Khrabrostin 17, Yuriy Vanyushkin 43 pen, Sergei Petrenko 57. Att: 6,000]

=== Quarterfinals ===
[Jun 6, 21] 
LOKOMOTIV Moskva        1-0  2-2  Dinamo Tbilisi 
  [1. Valeriy Gazzayev 45. Att: 7,000] 
  [2. Vladimir Shevchuk 74, Valeriy Gazzayev 84 – Vladimir Gutsayev 5, Vakhtang Koridze 72. Att: 25,000] 
[Jun 7, 21] 
DINAMO Kiev             3-2  0-0  Zenit Leningrad 
  [1. Alexandr Berezhnoi 10, Leonid Buryak 31, Vladimir Onishchenko 52 – Yuriy Timofeyev 67, 73. Att: 15,000] 
  [2. Att: 20,000] 
Dinamo Moskva           2-1  0-1  TORPEDO Moskva 
  [1. Oleg Dolmatov 7, Nikolai Kolesov 63 – Sergei Grishin 71. Att: 15,000] 
  [2. Yevgeniy Khrabrostin 27. Att: 10,000] 
SHAKHTYOR Donetsk       1-1  2-0  Neftchi Baku 
  [1. Vitaliy Starukhin 26 – Asif Aliyev 19. Att: 25,000] 
  [2. Vladimir Pyanykh 9, Yuriy Reznik 90. Att: 5,500]

=== Semifinals ===
[Jul 4, 18] 
Lokomotiv Moskva        0-2  0-1  SHAKHTYOR Donetsk 
  [1. Mikhail Sokolovskiy 74, Nikolai Latysh 75. Att: 7,000] 
  [2. Yuriy Dudinskiy 10. Att: 39,000] 
[Jul 5, 19] 
Torpedo Moskva          1-2  1-2  DINAMO Kiev 
  [1. Yevgeniy Khrabrostin 31 – Vladimir Bessonov 9, 52. Att: 22,000] 
  [2. Nikolai Vasilyev 4 – Alexandr Berezhnoi 15, Vladimir Onishchenko 66. Att: 10,000]

==== Final ====
12 August 1978

Dinamo Kiev	2 – 1 (a.e.t.)	Shakhter Donetsk
Blokhin 55', 92'	Report	Starukhin 15'

Torpedo Stadium, Moscow
Attendance: 22,000
Referee: Myroslav Stupar (Stanislav)
