= 1985 Ballon d'Or =

Annual association football award event in France

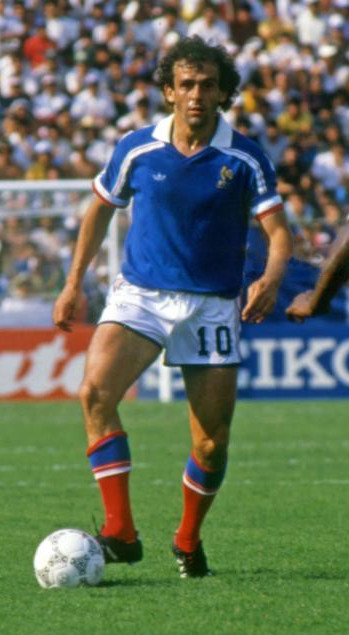
- 1985 Ballon d'Or winner, Michel Platini in 1986
- Date: 24 December 1985
- Presented by: France Football

Highlights
- Won by: (France) Michel Platini (3rd award)
- Website: ballondor.com

The 1985 Ballon d'Or, given to the best football player in Europe as judged by a panel of sports journalists from UEFA member countries, was awarded to Michel Platini on 24 December 1985.

== Rankings ==
| Rank | Name | Club(s) | Nationality | Points |
|---|---|---|---|---|
| 1 | Michel Platini | (Italy) Juventus | France | 127 |
| 2 | Preben Elkjær | (Italy) Hellas Verona | Denmark | 71 |
| 3 | Bernd Schuster | (Spain) Barcelona | West Germany | 46 |
| 4 | Michael Laudrup | (Italy) Juventus | Denmark | 14 |
| 5 | Karl-Heinz Rummenigge | (Italy) Internazionale | West Germany | 13 |
| 6 | Zbigniew Boniek | (Italy) Roma | Poland | 12 |
| 7 | Oleh Protasov | (Soviet Union) Dnepr Dnepropetrovsk | Soviet Union | 10 |
| 8 | Hans-Peter Briegel | (Italy) Hellas Verona | West Germany | 9 |
| 9 | Bryan Robson | (England) Manchester United | England | 8 |
| 9 | Rinat Dasayev | (Soviet Union) Spartak Moscow | Soviet Union | 8 |
| 11 | Rudi Völler | (West Germany) Werder Bremen | West Germany | 7 |
| 12 | Luis Fernández | (France) Paris Saint-Germain | France | 6 |
| 12 | Søren Lerby | (West Germany) Bayern Munich | Denmark | 6 |
| 14 | Rafael Gordillo | (Spain) Real Madrid | Spain | 5 |
| 14 | Ian Rush | (England) Liverpool | Wales | 5 |
| 16 | Emilio Butragueño | (Spain) Real Madrid | Spain | 4 |
| 16 | Fernando Gomes | (Portugal) Porto | Portugal | 4 |
| 18 | Harald Schumacher | (West Germany) 1. FC Köln | West Germany | 3 |
| 18 | John Sivebæk | (Denmark) Vejle | Denmark | 3 |
| 18 | Neville Southall | (England) Everton | Wales | 3 |
| 21 | Lajos Détári | (Hungary) Budapest Honvéd | Hungary | 2 |
| 21 | Alain Giresse | (France) Bordeaux | France | 2 |
| 21 | Vahid Halilhodžić | (France) Nantes | Yugoslavia | 2 |
| 21 | Tibor Nyilasi | Austria Wien | Hungary | 2 |
| 21 | Peter Reid | (England) Everton | England | 2 |
| 21 | Peter Shilton | (England) Southampton | England | 2 |
| 21 | Graeme Souness | (Italy) Sampdoria | Scotland | 2 |
| 21 | Pat Jennings | (England) Tottenham Hotspur | Northern Ireland | 2 |
| 29 | Steve Archibald | (Spain) Barcelona | Scotland | 1 |
| 29 | Jan Ceulemans | (Belgium) Club Brugge | Belgium | 1 |
| 29 | Anatoliy Demyanenko | (Soviet Union) Dinamo Kyiv | Soviet Union | 1 |
| 29 | Georgi Dimitrov | (Bulgaria) CSKA Sofia | Bulgaria | 1 |
| 29 | Gheorghe Hagi | (Romania) Sportul Studențesc | Romania | 1 |
| 29 | Mark Hateley | (Italy) Milan | England | 1 |
| 29 | Herbert Prohaska | Austria Wien | Austria | 1 |
| 29 | Gary Stevens | (England) Everton | England | 1 |
| 29 | Andreas Thom | (East Germany) Dynamo Berlin | East Germany | 1 |
| 29 | Ladislav Vízek | (Czech Republic) Dukla Prague | Czechoslovakia | 1 |
