= Kateryna Adamenko =

Ukrainian athlete and coach (1918–2012)

Kateryna Zakharivna Adamenko (7 November 1918 – 21 May 2012) was a Ukrainian athlete and coach, Honored Master of Sports of the USSR (1950), repeated champion of the USSR and Ukraine in the pentathlon, long jump, and running 80 and 100 meters with barriers. Mother of Ukrainian football player and football coach Oleg Blokhin.

== Early life and education ==
Kateryna Adamenko was born on 7 November 1918 in Nebrat village, Borodyanka district, Kyiv region. In 1932, Adamenko being a 14-year-old schoolgirl went to Kyiv to study as a seamstress at the Kyiv Factory School at the Gorky Garment Factory. This is where her sports career began. Adamenko participated in the citywide athletics cross on the route Bessarabka - "Red Stadium" (today - NSC "Olympic") and, unexpectedly for everyone, won the race, and was immediately invited to the Kyiv national athletics team.

== Career ==
Before World War II Adamenko got married and gave birth to a son, Mykola in 1939. Almost immediately, the Winter War began and Adamenko's husband was drafted into the army and sent to the Karelian Isthmus.

In 1940, Adamenko became a champion of the USSR. On Sunday, June 22, 1941, Katerina was supposed to participate in a sports parade at the opening of the renovated Red Stadium, which, after reconstruction, was named after Nikita Khrushchev but the celebration did not take place due to the outbreak of the war. At the beginning of the war, she and her son were evacuated to the Russian hinterland, where the funeral of Adamenko's first husband took place. In January 1944 Adamenko and her son Mykola returned to Kyiv.

Since 1944 she worked as a teacher, and later a senior lecturer at Kyiv University.

In 1950, Adamenko was awarded the title of Honored Master of Sports of the USSR. The same year she married for the second time to Interior Ministry officer Volodymyr Blokhin. In 1952 their son Oleg was born. Motherhood did not prevent Adamenko from joining the USSR Olympic team at the Summer Olympics in Helsinki.

From 1936 to 1952 Adamenko was a member of the national teams of the Ukrainian SSR and the USSR (pentathlon, long jump, running 80 and 100 meters with barriers), setting 87 records of the Ukrainian SSR.

In 1958, Adamenko graduated from the Kyiv Institute of Physical Culture. Since 1958 worked at the Department of Physical Education of the Kyiv Civil Engineering Institute for over 50 years.

Kateryna Adamenko died on 21 May 2012 from atherosclerosis at the age of 93 and was buried at Baikove Cemetery in Kyiv.
