= Oleg Blokhin =

Ukrainian footballer and manager

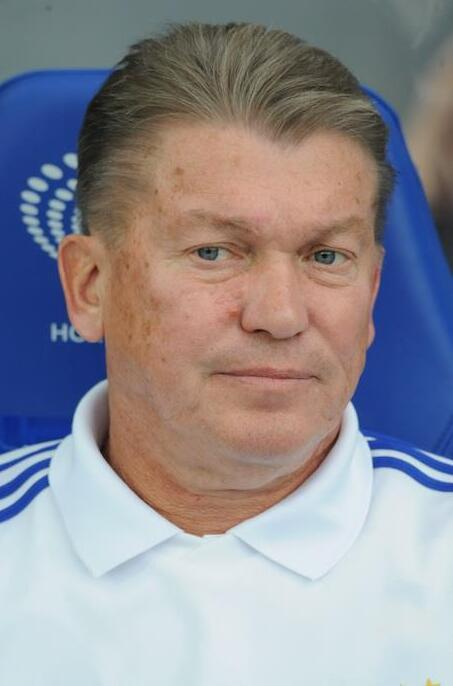
- Blokhin as manager of Dynamo Kyiv in 2014

Personal information
- Full name: Oleg Vladimirovich Blokhin / Oleh Volodymyrovych Blokhin
- Date of birth: 5 November 1952 (age 74)
- Place of birth: Kiev, Ukrainian SSR, Soviet Union (now Kyiv, Ukraine)
- Height: 1.80 m (5 ft 11 in)
- Position: Forward

Youth career
- 1962–1969: Dynamo Kyiv

Senior career*
Years	Team	Apps	(Gls)
1969–1988	Dynamo Kyiv	432	(211)
1988–1989	Vorwärts Steyr	41	(9)
1989–1990	Aris Limassol	22	(5)
Total		495	(225)

International career
1972–1988	Soviet Union	112	(42)

Managerial career
- 1990–1993: Olympiacos
- 1993–1994: PAOK
- 1994–1997: Ionikos
- 1998: PAOK
- 1998–1999: AEK Athens
- 2000–2002: Ionikos
- 2003–2007: Ukraine
- 2007–2008: Moscow
- 2011–2012: Ukraine
- 2012–2014: Dynamo Kyiv
Medal record
Men's football
Representing USSR
Olympic Games
Bronze medal – third place	1972 Munich	Team competition
Bronze medal – third place	1976 Montreal	Team competition
UEFA European U-23 Championships
Runner-up	1972 Europe
- * Club domestic league appearances and goals

Oleh Volodymyrovych Blokhin (Ukrainian: Олег Володимирович Блохін) or Oleg Vladimirovich Blokhin (Russian: Олег Владимирович Блохин; born 5 November 1952), is a Ukrainian former football player and manager. Regarded as one of the greatest footballers of his generation, Blokhin was a standout striker for Dynamo Kyiv and the Soviet Union.

He holds the all-time top goalscorer record for both Dynamo Kyiv (266 goals) and the Soviet Union national team (42 goals), as well as being the overall top goalscorer in the history of the Soviet Top League (211 goals). He is also the only player to have been capped over 100 times for the Soviet Union and holds Dynamo's appearance record with 582 appearances during his 18-year spell at the club. With Dynamo, Blokhin won eight Soviet league titles, five national cups and two European Cup Winners' Cups. He also competed for the Soviet Union at the 1972 and 1976 Olympic Games and 1982 and 1986 FIFA World Cups. During his playing career he won the Soviet Footballer of the Year award three times and the Ukrainian Footballer of the Year award nine times (both records). In 1975, he was named European Footballer of the Year, winning the Ballon d'Or, becoming the second Soviet and the first Ukrainian player to achieve such a feat.

As a coach, he has had two spells in charge of the Ukraine national team, managing the team at the 2006 FIFA World Cup and UEFA Euro 2012.

In 2011, Blokhin, together with Igor Belanov and Vitaliy Starukhin, were named as "the legends of Ukrainian football" at the Victory of Football awards.

== Early life ==
Blokhin was born in Kyiv, the capital of the Ukrainian SSR, in 1952. His mother Kateryna Adamenko was multiple champion of USSR in the pentathlon, sprint and long jump. He was born to a Russian father and Ukrainian mother. His father Vladimir Blokhin was a police officer, a World War II veteran, and a competitive sprinter. Owing to his parents, Blokhin quickly mastered sprint, and by the age of 16 ran 60 m in less than 7 seconds, and 100 m in 11.0 seconds.

== Playing career ==
Blokhin played for Dynamo Kyiv during the 1970s. He became the highest goalscorer in the Soviet League. Typically a forward or winger, Blokhin was noted for his pace.

Blokhin played during most of his career for Dynamo Kyiv, becoming the USSR national championship's all-time leader and goalscorer with 211 goals, as well as making more appearances than any other player with 432 appearances. He won the championship 8 times. He led Dynamo to the UEFA Cup Winners' Cup in 1975 and 1986, scoring a goal in each final. Blokhin is also the USSR national football team's most capped player with 112 caps, as well as their all-time leading goalscorer with 42 goals; he played in the 1982 and 1986 FIFA World Cups where he scored one goal in each. He was one of the first Soviet players to play abroad, signing for Austria's Vorwärts Steyr in 1988, he also played in Cyprus with Aris.

In 1979 Blokhin played a couple of games for Ukraine at the Spartakiad of the Peoples of the USSR.

== Managerial career ==
After retiring as a player, Blokhin coached Greek clubs Olympiacos (Under him they won the Greek Cup and the Greek Super Cup in 1992), PAOK, AEK Athens, and Ionikos.

He began serving as the head coach of the Ukraine national team in September 2003. Under his leadership, Ukraine qualified for a major tournament for the first time as an independent nation, reaching the 2006 FIFA World Cup in Germany. Ukraine reached the quarter-finals of the tournament, losing to eventual champions Italy. Following the side's failure to reach UEFA Euro 2008, Blokhin stepped down as coach on 6 December 2007.

On 14 December 2007, he was named head coach of FC Moscow. The club finished 9th (from 16) and after the season ended Blokhin was fired from the club. At the end of the season, Blokhin announced that if he knew how things would go in FC Moscow, he would have never signed there. This was because the club released many important players without Blokhin's permission yet still had many high expectations. Others said that the reason Blokhin failed in FC Moscow was that he and the press didn't have a friendly relationship, and because of that the press was constantly attacking Blokhin and that damaged his status among the players.

On 21 April 2011, Blokhin was again appointed head coach of the Ukraine national team. He led the team in UEFA Euro 2012 on home soil, beating Sweden but exiting at the group stage after defeats to France and England.

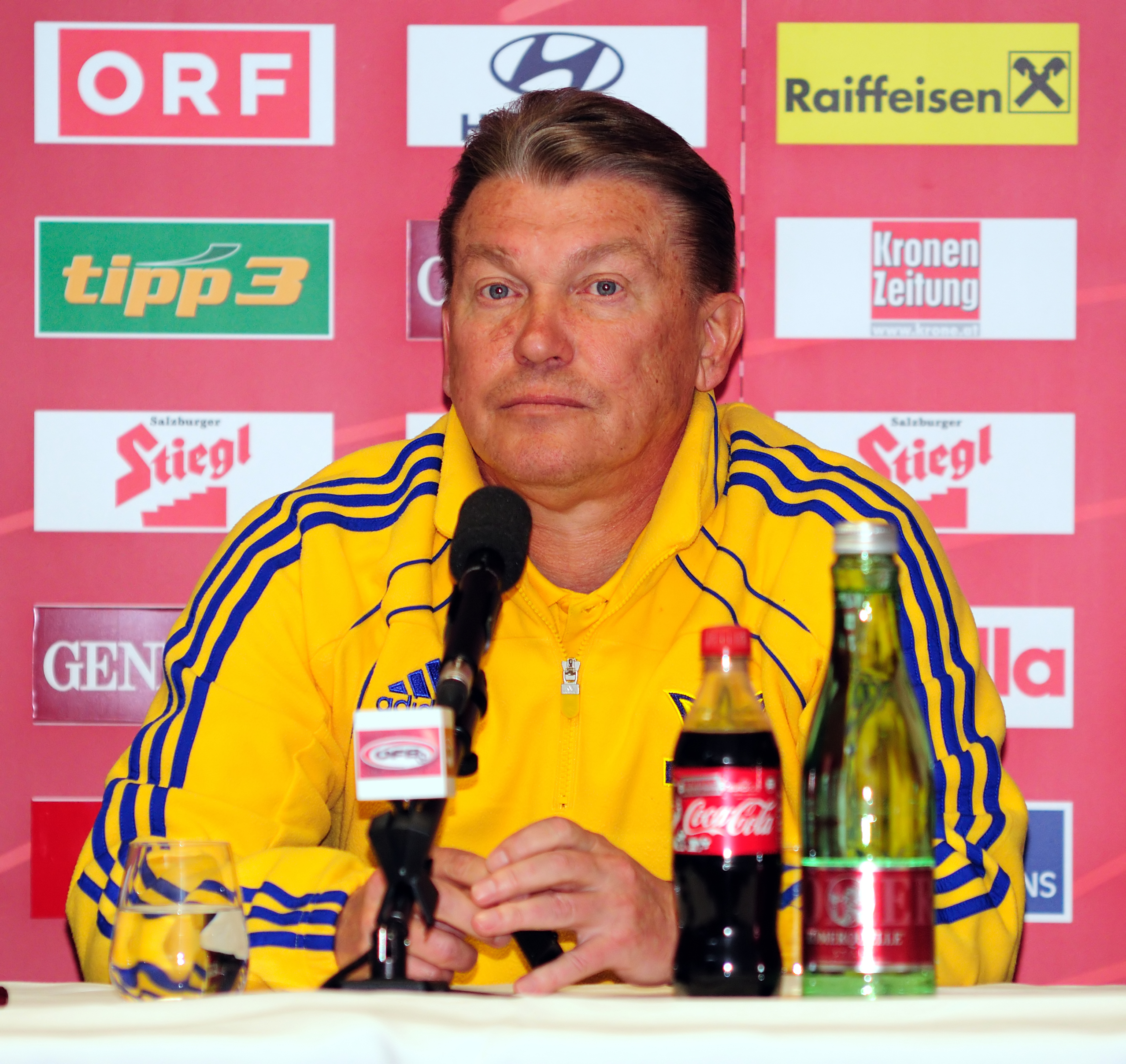
Blokhin in 2012

On 25 September 2012, Dynamo Kyiv signed Blokhin to lead the club for the next four years. His final matches in charge of Ukraine were World Cup qualifiers against Moldova and Montenegro in October 2012. Blokhin was dismissed as Dynamo's manager by the club's President Ihor Surkis on 17 April 2014 because of the "unsatisfactory results of the team". The day before, in a press conference after Dynamo had lost a match against Shakhtar Donetsk, Blokhin had already stated that he had decided to resign. Under his leadership Dynamo never qualified (a rare occasion for the club) for the UEFA Champions League and performed poorly in the UEFA Europa League. In his first year his team finished third in the Ukrainian Premier League and in his second year (when he was fired) Dynamo was seven points behind Ukrainian Premier League leaders Dnipro Dnipropetrovsk and Shakhtar Donetsk.

== Politics ==
In 1998 Blokhin was elected to Verkhovna Rada (Ukraine's parliament) for Hromada. He joined Hromada while still being a member of the Communist Party of Ukraine. In March 2002, Blokhin was elected to Verkhovna Rada for a second term. In October 2002, he joined the United Social Democratic Party of Ukraine.

== Family ==
Blokhin's father, Vladimir Blokhin, is a native of Moscow, a veteran of the World War II, survivor of the Leningrad blockade, and a former Soviet law enforcement agent (militsiya). He later worked as a sports functionary for the republican Dynamo Society, which is related to law enforcement and the state security forces. Blokhin's mother Kateryna Adamenko is from Nebrat village in Borodianka Raion, Kyiv Oblast. She originally worked at a Kyiv sewing factory, but eventually discovered hidden athletic talents and became the Soviet champion in track and field as well as pentathlon. After retiring from sports, she became a staff member at one of Kyiv's universities.

Blokhin was married to Irina Deriugina, a top coach and former world champion in rhythmic gymnastics, but the couple divorced in the early 1990s. Blokhin and Deriugina have a daughter, singer Iryna Blokhina, who wrote and performed the Euro 2012 anthem.

Blokhin and his second wife, Angela, have two daughters, Hanna (born 2001) and Katerina (born 2002).

== Career statistics ==
=== Club ===
Appearances and goals by club, season and competition
Club	Season	League		Cup		Europe		Super Cup		Total	
Club	Season	Apps	Goals	Apps	Goals	Apps	Goals	Apps	Goals	Apps	Goals
Dynamo Kyiv	1969	1	0	—		—		—		1	0
Dynamo Kyiv	1970	—		1	0	—		—		1	0
Dynamo Kyiv	1971	1	0	—		—		—		1	0
Dynamo Kyiv	1972	27	14	2	0	6	1	—		35	15
Dynamo Kyiv	1973	29	18	8	4	5	1	—		42	23
Dynamo Kyiv	1974	29	20	4	3	9	5	—		42	28
Dynamo Kyiv	1975	28	18	—		8	5	—		36	23
Dynamo Kyiv	1976	19	8	1	0	8	2	—		28	10
Dynamo Kyiv	1977	29	17	3	2	2	0	1	0	35	19
Dynamo Kyiv	1978	26	13	8	4	4	0	—		38	17
Dynamo Kyiv	1979	24	17	6	1	4	1	—		34	19
Dynamo Kyiv	1980	33	19	7	3	2	0	—		42	22
Dynamo Kyiv	1981	29	19	7	3	6	1	1	0	43	23
Dynamo Kyiv	1982	24	10	3	0	4	0	—		31	10
Dynamo Kyiv	1983	31	10	1	0	2	0	—		34	10
Dynamo Kyiv	1984	30	10	6	2	—		—		36	12
Dynamo Kyiv	1985	29	12	2	1	9	5	—		40	18
Dynamo Kyiv	1986	23	2	5	5	8	5	1	0	37	12
Dynamo Kyiv	1987	20	4	3	1	2	0	1	0	26	5
Dynamo Kyiv	Total	432	211	67	29	79	26	4	0	582	266
SK Vorwärts Steyr	1987–88	13	5	—		—		—		13	5
SK Vorwärts Steyr	1988–89	28	4	1	1	—		—		29	5
SK Vorwärts Steyr	Total	41	9	1	1	—		—		42	10
Aris Limassol	1989–90	22	5	6	2	—		—		28	7
Career total		495	225	74	32	79	26	4	0	652	283

- The statistics in USSR Cups and Europe is made under the scheme "autumn-spring" and enlisted in a year of start of tournaments

=== International ===
Appearances and goals by national team and year
National team	Year	Apps	Goals
Soviet Union	1972	9	8
Soviet Union	1973	10	1
Soviet Union	1974	3	0
Soviet Union	1975	7	2
Soviet Union	1976	12	4
Soviet Union	1977	10	4
Soviet Union	1978	10	6
Soviet Union	1979	5	1
Soviet Union	1980	2	1
Soviet Union	1981	6	5
Soviet Union	1982	9	2
Soviet Union	1983	9	5
Soviet Union	1984	3	1
Soviet Union	1985	4	0
Soviet Union	1986	11	2
Soviet Union	1987	1	0
Soviet Union	1988	1	0
Total		112	42

Scores and results list the Soviet Union's goal tally first, score column indicates score after each Blokhin goal.

List of international goals scored by Oleg Blokhin
No.	Date	Venue	Opponent	Score	Result	Competition
1	16 July 1972	Helsinki Olympic Stadium, Helsinki, Finland	Finland	1–0	1–1	Friendly
2	6 August 1972	Råsunda Stadion, Stockholm, Sweden	Sweden	4–3	4–4	Friendly
3	1972-09-01	Jahnstadion, Regensburg, West Germany	Mexico	1–0	4–1	1972 Olympics
4	1972-09-01	Jahnstadion, Regensburg, West Germany	Mexico	2–0	4–1	1972 Olympics
5	1972-09-01	Jahnstadion, Regensburg, West Germany	Mexico	3–0	4–1	1972 Olympics
6	5 September 1972	Rosenaustadion, Augsburg, West Germany	Poland	1–0	1–2	1972 Olympics
7	8 September 1972	Rosenaustadion, Augsburg, West Germany	Denmark	3–0	4–0	1972 Olympics
8	10 September 1972	Olympic Stadium, Munich, West Germany	East Germany	1–0	2–2	1972 Olympics
9	26 May 1973	Central Lenin Stadium, Moscow, Soviet Union	France	1–0	2–0	1972 FIFA World Cup qualification
10	2 April 1975	Kyiv Central Stadium, Kyiv, Soviet Union	Turkey	3–0	3–0	UEFA Euro 1976 qualification
11	18 May 1975	Kyiv Central Stadium, Kyiv, Soviet Union	Republic of Ireland	1–0	2–1	UEFA Euro 1976 qualification
12	10 March 1976	Všešportový areál, Košice, Czechoslovakia	Czechoslovakia	1–0	2–2	Friendly
13	24 March 1976	Vasil Levski National Stadium, Sofia, Bulgaria	Bulgaria	3–0	3–0	Friendly
14	22 May 1976	Kyiv Central Stadium, Kyiv	Czechoslovakia	2–2	2–2	UEFA Euro 1976 qualification
15	23 July 1976	Lansdowne Park, Ottawa, Canada	North Korea	3–0	3–0	1976 Olympics
16	1977-03-23	JNA Stadium, Belgrade, Yugoslavia	Yugoslavia	1–0	4–2	Friendly
17	1977-03-23	JNA Stadium, Belgrade, Yugoslavia	Yugoslavia	3–1	4–2	Friendly
18	1977-09-07	Central Stadium, Volgograd, Soviet Union	Poland	3–1	4–1	Friendly
19	1977-09-07	Central Stadium, Volgograd, Soviet Union	Poland	4–1	4–1	Friendly
20	26 February 1978	Stade El Harti, Marrakesh, Morocco	Morocco	1–1	3–2	Friendly
21	1978-04-05	Hrazdan Stadium, Yerevan, Soviet Union	Finland	4–0	10–2	Friendly
22	1978-04-05	Hrazdan Stadium, Yerevan, Soviet Union	Finland	6–0	10–2	Friendly
23	1978-04-05	Hrazdan Stadium, Yerevan, Soviet Union	Finland	9–1	10–2	Friendly
24	14 May 1978	Stadionul 23 August, Bucharest, Romania	Romania	1–0	1–0	Friendly
25	5 October 1978	Ankara 19 Mayıs Stadium, Ankara, Turkey	Turkey	2–0	2–0	Friendly
26	28 March 1979	Lokomotiv Stadium, Simferopol, Soviet Union	Bulgaria	1–0	3–1	Friendly
27	27 August 1980	Népstadion, Budapest, Hungary	Hungary	1–1	4–1	Friendly
28	23 September 1981	Central Lenin Stadium, Moscow	Turkey	3–0	4–0	1982 FIFA World Cup qualification
29	1981-10-07	İzmir Atatürk Stadium, İzmir, Turkey	Turkey	2–0	3–0	1982 World Cup qualification
30	1981-10-07	İzmir Atatürk Stadium, İzmir, Turkey	Turkey	3–0	3–0	1982 World Cup qualification
31	18 November 1981	Dinamo Stadium, Tbilisi, Soviet Union	Wales	2–0	3–0	1982 World Cup qualification
32	29 November 1981	Tehelné pole, Bratislava, Czechoslovakia	Czechoslovakia	1–0	1–1	1982 World Cup qualification
33	3 June 1982	Råsunda Stadion, Stockholm, Sweden	Sweden	1–0	1–1	Friendly
34	19 June 1982	Estadio La Rosaleda, Málaga, Spain	New Zealand	2–0	3–0	1982 FIFA World Cup
35	13 April 1983	Stade Olympique de la Pontaise, Lausanne, Switzerland	Switzerland	1–0	1–0	Friendly
36	17 May 1983	Praterstadion, Vienna, Austria	Austria	2–1	2–2	Friendly
37	1 June 1983	Helsinki Olympic Stadium, Helsinki, Finland	Finland	1–0	1–0	UEFA Euro 1984 qualification
38	26 July 1983	Zentralstadion, Leipzig, East Germany	East Germany	1–0	3–1	Friendly
39	9 October 1983	Central Lenin Stadium, Moscow, Soviet Union	Poland	2–0	2–0	UEFA Euro 1984 qualification
40	19 August 1984	Kirov Stadium, Leningrad, Soviet Union	Mexico	3–0	3–0	Friendly
41	9 June 1986	Estadio Sergio León Chavez, Irapuato, Mexico	Canada	1–0	2–0	1986 FIFA World Cup
42	29 October 1986	Lokomotiv Stadium, Simferopol, Soviet Union	Norway	3–0	3–0	UEFA Euro 1988 qualification

== Managerial statistics ==
As of 5 November 2020

Team	From	To	Record					Achievement
Team	From	To	G	W	D	L	Win %	Achievement
Olympiacos	06/1990	01/1993	96	56	27	13	58.33	League runner-up in 1991, 1992, Cup holder in 1992
PAOK	1993	1994	40	19	11	10	47.50	
Ionikos	12/1994	02/1997	82	29	18	35	35.37	
PAOK	1998	1998	5	1	2	2	20.00	
AEK Athens	11/1998	05/1999	24	16	4	4	66.67	
Ionikos	03/2000	01/2002	71	23	18	30	32.39	Cup finalist in 2000
Ukraine	01/2003	12/2007	44	21	12	11	47.73	Won qual.group for 2006, Reached 2006 World Cup quarter-finals
Moscow	12/2007	11/2008	36	13	12	11	36.11	
Ukraine	04/2011	2012	18	7	3	8	38.89	Eliminated at group stage of Euro 2012
Dynamo Kyiv	09/2012	03/2014	61	36	10	15	59.02	
Total	06/1990	03/2014	477	221	117	139	46.33	

== Honours ==
Dynamo Kyiv

- Soviet Top League (8): 1971, 1974, 1975, 1977, 1980, 1981, 1985, 1986
- Soviet Cup: 1974, 1978, 1982, 1984–85, 1986–87
- USSR Super Cup: 1981, 1986, 1987
- UEFA Cup Winners Cup: 1974–75, 1985–86
- UEFA Super Cup: 1975; Runner-up: 1986

Individual

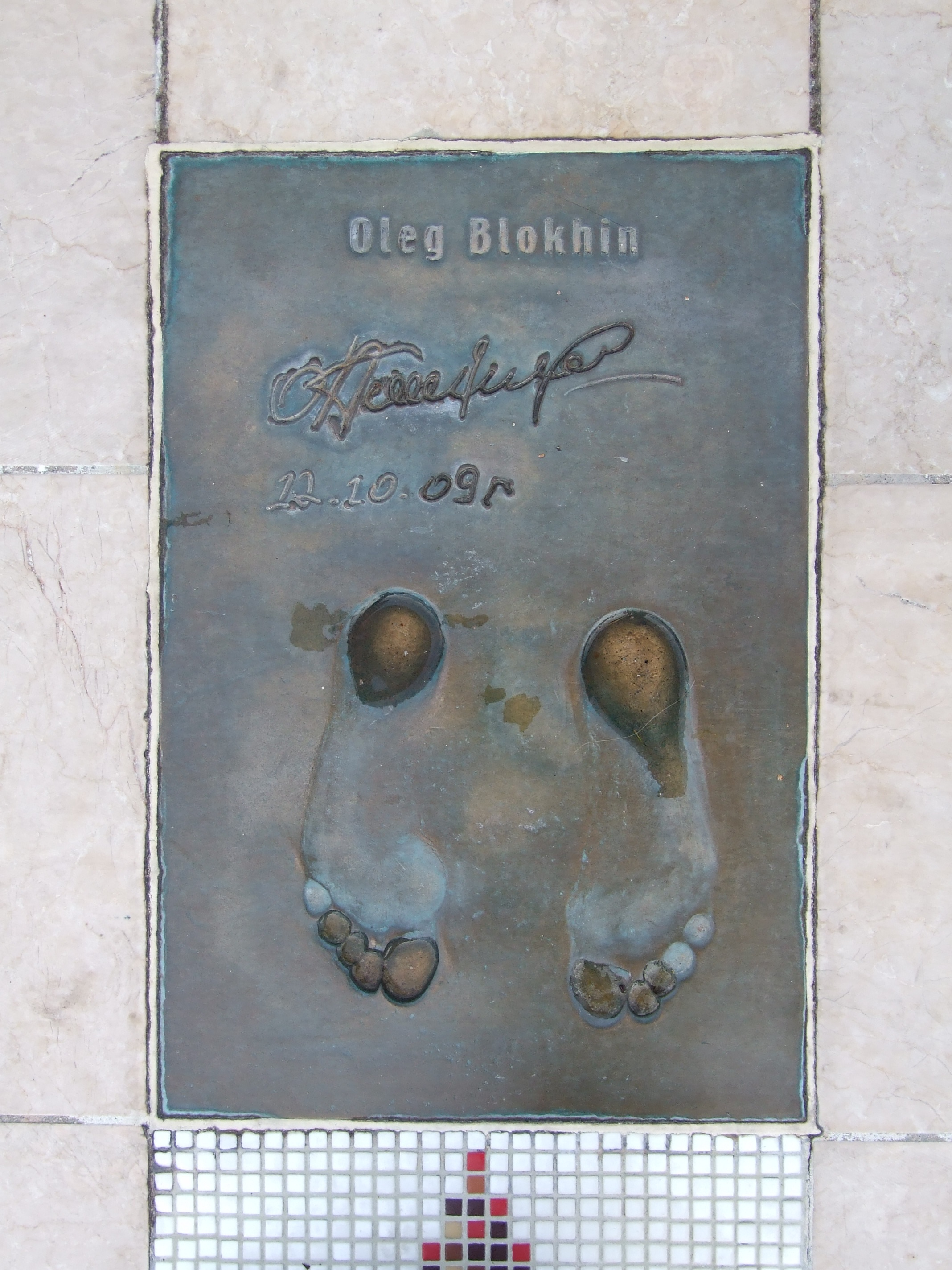
Blokhin's Golden Foot, awarded in 2009

- Merited Master of Sports (1975)
- Merited Coach of Ukraine (2005)
- Ballon d'Or: 1975
- Guerin Sportivo All-Star Team: 1981
- ADN Eastern European Footballer of the Season: 1975, 1977, 1981
- Sport Ideal European XI: 1975
- Eric Batty's World XI: 1976
- Golden Foot: 2009, as a legend
- Soviet Footballer of the Year: 1973, 1974, 1975
- Ukrainian Footballer of the Year (9): 1972, 1973, 1974, 1975, 1976, 1977, 1978, 1980, 1981
- Soviet Top League top scorer: 1972, 1973, 1974, 1975, 1977
- Soviet Top League All-Time Goals and Appearances Leader
- Soviet Cup All-Time Goals
- UEFA Cup Winners' Cup 1985–86 top scorer
- European Cup 1986–87 second place on top scorers list.
- USSR national football team All-Time Goals and Caps Leader
- Ukraine's Golden Player representative
- UEFA Jubilee Poll (2004): #80
- The best 33 football players of the Soviet Union (15): No. 1 (1972–1982, 1985, 1986), No. 2 (1983, 1984)
- Club Loyalty Award: 1986
- IFFHS Legends
- Placar's 100 Stars of the World Cup: #90
- Planète Foot's 50 Best Players of all Time
- Voetbal International's World Stars by Raf Willems

Ballon d'Or

- 1974 – 19th
- 1975 – 1st
- 1976 – 19th
- 1981 – 5th

== See also ==
- List of top international men's football goalscorers by country
- List of men's footballers with 100 or more international caps
- Oleh Blokhin club
