= 1973 Ballon d'Or =

Annual association football award event in France

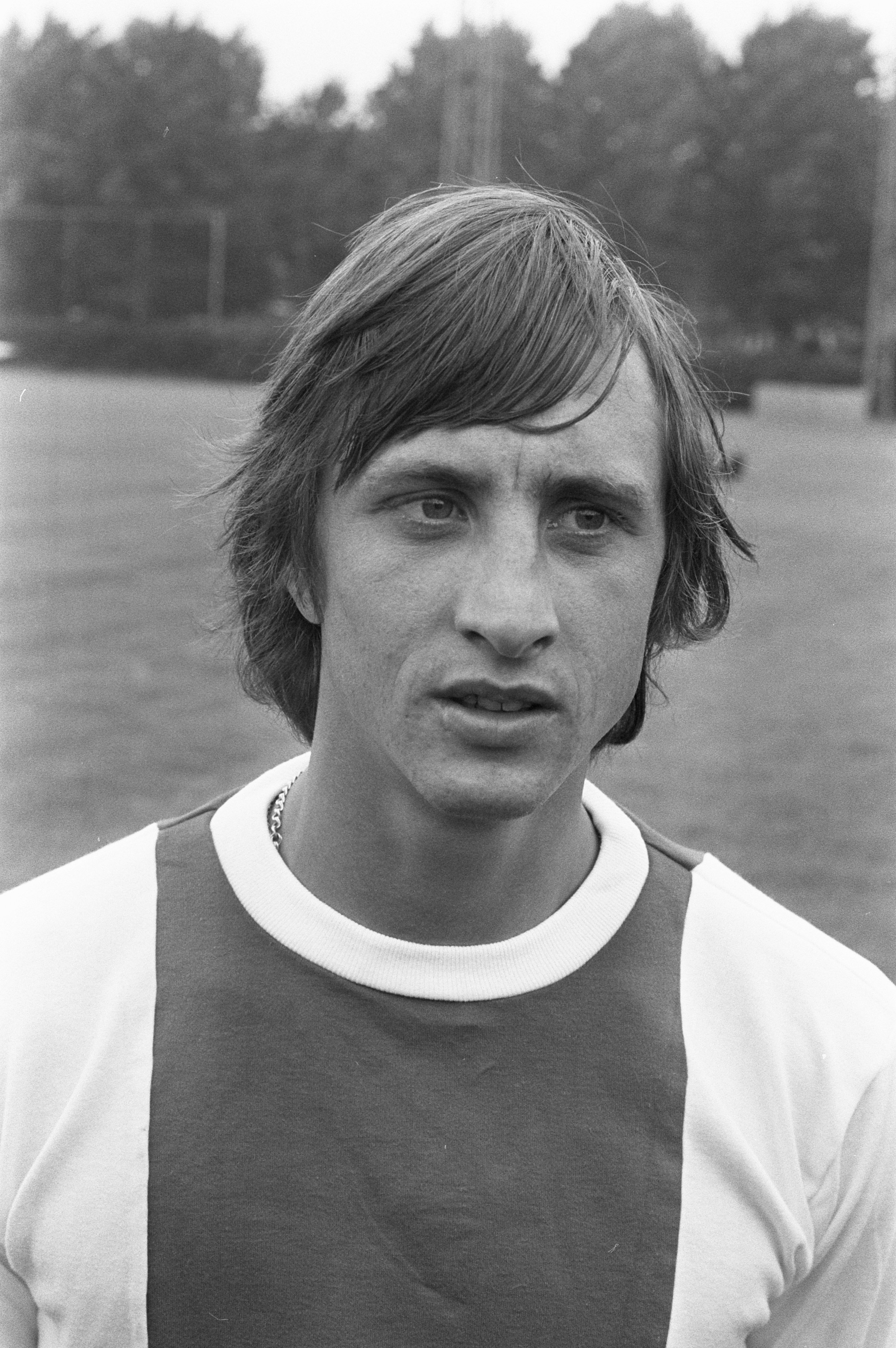
- 1973 Ballon d'Or winner, Johan Cruyff
- Date: 25 December 1973
- Presented by: France Football

Highlights
- Won by: (Netherlands) Johan Cruyff (2nd award)
- Website: ballondor.com

The 1973 Ballon d'Or, given to the best football player in Europe as judged by a panel of sports journalists from UEFA member countries on 25 December 1973. It was awarded to Dutch midfielder Johan Cruyff, for the second time.

== Rankings ==
| Rank | Player | Club(s) | Nationality | Points |
|---|---|---|---|---|
| 1 | Johan Cruyff | (Netherlands) Ajax (Spain) Barcelona | Netherlands | 96 |
| 2 | Dino Zoff | (Italy) Juventus | Italy | 47 |
| 3 | Gerd Müller | (West Germany) Bayern Munich | West Germany | 44 |
| 4 | Franz Beckenbauer | (West Germany) Bayern Munich | West Germany | 30 |
| 5 | Billy Bremner | (England) Leeds United | Scotland | 22 |
| 6 | Kazimierz Deyna | (Poland) Legia Warsaw | Poland | 16 |
| 7 | Eusébio | (Portugal) Benfica | Portugal | 14 |
| 8 | Gianni Rivera | (Italy) Milan | Italy | 12 |
| 9 | Ralf Edström | (Sweden) Åtvidabergs FF (Netherlands) PSV Eindhoven | Sweden | 11 |
| 9 | Günter Netzer | (West Germany) Borussia Mönchengladbach (Spain) Real Madrid | West Germany | 11 |
| 11 | Uli Hoeneß | (West Germany) Bayern Munich | West Germany | 8 |
| 12 | Hristo Bonev | (Bulgaria) Lokomotiv Plovdiv | Bulgaria | 7 |
| 12 | Giacinto Facchetti | (Italy) Internazionale | Italy | 7 |
| 14 | Juan Manuel Asensi | (Spain) Barcelona | Spain | 5 |
| 14 | Sandro Mazzola | (Italy) Internazionale | Italy | 5 |
| 14 | Jan Tomaszewski | (Poland) ŁKS Łódź | Poland | 5 |
| 17 | Włodzimierz Lubański | (Poland) Górnik Zabrze | Poland | 4 |
| 18 | Wolfgang Overath | (West Germany) 1. FC Köln | West Germany | 3 |
| 19 | Barry Hulshoff | (Netherlands) Ajax | Netherlands | 2 |
| 19 | Hans-Jürgen Kreische | (East Germany) Dynamo Dresden | East Germany | 2 |
| 19 | Bobby Moore | (England) West Ham United | England | 2 |
| 19 | Roland Sandberg | (Sweden) Åtvidabergs FF (West Germany) 1. FC Kaiserslautern | Sweden | 2 |
| 23 | Vladislav Bogićević | (Socialist Federal Republic of Yugoslavia) Red Star Belgrade | Yugoslavia | 1 |
| 23 | Dragan Džajić | (Socialist Federal Republic of Yugoslavia) Red Star Belgrade | Yugoslavia | 1 |
| 23 | Pat Jennings | (England) Tottenham Hotspur | Northern Ireland | 1 |
| 23 | Denis Law | (England) Manchester City | Scotland | 1 |
| 23 | Ivo Viktor | (Czechoslovakia) Dukla Prague | Czechoslovakia | 1 |

Source: France Football
