= 1967 FA Cup final =

- Event: 1966–67 FA Cup
| Tottenham Hotspur | Chelsea |
| 2 | 1 |
- Date: 20 May 1967
- Venue: Wembley Stadium, London
- Referee: Ken Dagnall (Bolton)
- Attendance: 100,000

The 1967 FA Cup final was the 86th final of the FA Cup. It took place on 20 May 1967 at Wembley Stadium and was contested between Tottenham Hotspur and Chelsea. It was the first FA Cup Final to be contested between two teams from London, and is thus often dubbed the "Cockney Cup Final".

Tottenham won the match 2–1, their fifth triumph and third of the decade. Jimmy Robertson and Frank Saul scored Tottenham's goals, before Bobby Tambling scored a consolation for Chelsea. The match referee was Ken Dagnall from Lancashire.

== Match details ==
=== Summary ===
Spurs took the lead in the 40th minute, Jimmy Robertson scoring with a low right-footed strike from the edge of the penalty area. Tottenham continued to control the match in the second period, and scored a second goal midway through the half. Robertson was again involved, helping on a long throw from Dave Mackay that Frank Saul turned into the net with his right foot to the goalkeeper's left. Bobby Tambling headed Chelsea's goal in the 85th minute after a cross from the right which was missed by Pat Jennings.

20 May 1967

| Tottenham Hotspur | 2–1 | Chelsea |
|---|---|---|
| Robertson 40'; Saul 67' | (Report) | Tambling 85' |

Wembley Stadium, London
Attendance: 100,000
Referee: Ken Dagnall

| Tottenham Hotspur | Chelsea |

| GK | 1 | (Northern Ireland) Pat Jennings |
| DF | 2 | (Republic of Ireland) Joe Kinnear |
| DF | 3 | (England) Cyril Knowles |
| MF | 4 | (England) Alan Mullery |
| DF | 5 | (Wales) Mike England |
| DF | 6 | (Scotland) Dave Mackay (c) |
| MF | 7 | (Scotland) Jimmy Robertson |
| FW | 8 | (England) Jimmy Greaves |
| FW | 9 | (Scotland) Alan Gilzean |
| MF | 10 | (England) Terry Venables |
| MF | 11 | (England) Frank Saul |
Substitutes:
| MF | 12 | (Wales) Cliff Jones |
Manager:
(England) Bill Nicholson

| GK | 1 | (England) Peter Bonetti |
| DF | 2 | (England) Allan Harris |
| DF | 3 | (Scotland) Eddie McCreadie |
| MF | 4 | (England) John Hollins |
| DF | 5 | (England) Marvin Hinton |
| DF | 6 | (England) Ron Harris (c) |
| MF | 7 | (Scotland) Charlie Cooke |
| MF | 8 | (England) Tommy Baldwin |
| FW | 9 | (England) Tony Hateley |
| FW | 10 | (England) Bobby Tambling |
| MF | 11 | (Scotland) John Boyle |
Substitutes:
| DF | 12 | (England) Joe Kirkup |
Manager:
(Scotland) Tommy Docherty

== See also ==
- Chelsea F.C.–Tottenham Hotspur F.C. rivalry
