= 1966–67 FA Cup =

Tournament details
- Country: England; Wales

Final positions
- Champions: Tottenham Hotspur (5th title)
- Runners-up: Chelsea

Tournament statistics
- Top goal scorer(s): Jimmy Greaves; Bobby Tambling (6)

The 1966–67 FA Cup was the 86th season of the world's oldest football cup competition, the Football Association Challenge Cup, commonly known as the FA Cup. Tottenham Hotspur won the competition for the fifth time, beating Chelsea 2–1 in the first all-London final. The game was played at Wembley.

Matches were scheduled to be played at the stadium of the team named first on the date specified for each round, which was always a Saturday. Some matches, however, might be rescheduled for other days if there were clashes with games for other competitions or the weather was inclement. If scores were level after 90 minutes had been played, a replay would take place at the stadium of the second-named team later the same week. If the replayed match was drawn further replays would be held until a winner was determined. If scores were level after 90 minutes had been played in a replay, a 30-minute period of extra time would be played.

== Calendar ==
Round	Date
First round qualifying	Saturday 3 September 1966
Second round qualifying	Saturday 17 September 1966
Third round qualifying	Saturday 1 October 1966
Fourth round qualifying	Saturday 15 October 1966
First round proper	Saturday 26 November 1966
Second round proper	Saturday 7 January 1967
Third round proper	Saturday 28 January 1967
Fourth round proper	Saturday 18 February 1967
Fifth round proper	Saturday 11 March 1967
Quarter-finals	Saturday 8 April 1967
Semi-finals	Saturday 29 April 1967
Final	Saturday 20 May 1967

== Qualifying rounds ==
Most participating clubs that were not members of the Football League competed in the qualifying rounds to secure one of 30 places available in the first round.

The winners from the fourth qualifying round were Blyth Spartans, South Shields, Bishop Auckland, Morecambe, Wigan Athletic, Bangor City, Witton Albion, Tamworth, Nuneaton Borough, Hereford United, Gainsborough Trinity, Lowestoft Town, Grantham, Cambridge City, St Neots Town, Bedford Town, Chelmsford City, Folkestone Town, Horsham, Ashford Town (Kent), Sutton United, Wimbledon, Chesham United, Oxford City, Wycombe Wanderers, Enfield, Welton Rovers, Poole Town, Bath City and Yeovil Town.

Tamworth and St Neots Town were appearing in the competition proper for the first time. Of the rest, Witton Albion had last featured at this stage in 1957–58, Nuneaton Borough in 1954-55, Cambridge City in 1948-49, Horsham in 1947-48, Lowestoft Town in 1938-39 and Oxford City in 1933-34. Chesham United was participating in the first round proper for the first time since predecessor club Chesham Town had featured at the same stage in the 1887-88 tournament.

== Results ==
=== First round proper ===
At this stage the 48 clubs from the Football League Third and Fourth Divisions joined the 30 non-league clubs who came through the qualifying rounds. The final two non-league sides in this round, Wealdstone and Hendon were given byes as the champions and runners-up from the previous season's FA Amateur Cup.

Matches were scheduled to be played on Saturday, 26 November 1966. Ten were drawn and went to replays two, three or four days later. Of these, four required second replays, and two third replays.

Tie no	Home team	Score	Away team	Date
1	Enfield	6–0	Chesham United	26 November 1966
2	Ashford Town (Kent)	4–1	Cambridge City	26 November 1966
3	Chester	2–5	Middlesbrough	26 November 1966
4	Darlington	0–0	Stockport County	26 November 1966
Replay	Stockport County	1–1	Darlington	29 November 1966
Replay	Darlington	4–2	Stockport County	5 December 1966
5	Horsham	0–3	Swindon Town	26 November 1966
6	Bournemouth & Boscombe Athletic	3–0	Welton Rovers	26 November 1966
7	Bath City	1–0	Sutton United	26 November 1966
8	Grantham	2–1	Wimbledon	26 November 1966
9	Rochdale	1–3	Barrow	26 November 1966
10	Watford	1–0	Southend United	26 November 1966
11	Yeovil Town	1–3	Oxford United	26 November 1966
12	Walsall	2–0	St Neots Town	26 November 1966
13	Folkestone Town	2–2	Swansea Town	26 November 1966
Replay	Swansea Town	7–2	Folkestone Town	29 November 1966
14	Gillingham	4–1	Tamworth	26 November 1966
15	Crewe Alexandra	1–1	Grimsby Town	26 November 1966
Replay	Grimsby Town	0–1	Crewe Alexandra	30 November 1966
16	Lincoln City	3–4	Scunthorpe United	26 November 1966
17	Gainsborough Trinity	0–1	Colchester United	26 November 1966
18	Shrewsbury Town	5–2	Hartlepools United	26 November 1966
19	Wrexham	3–2	Chesterfield	26 November 1966
20	Bishop Auckland	1–1	Blyth Spartans	26 November 1966
Replay	Blyth Spartans	0–0	Bishop Auckland	30 November 1966
Replay	Bishop Auckland	3–3	Blyth Spartans	5 December 1966
Replay	Blyth Spartans	1–4	Bishop Auckland	8 December 1966
21	Tranmere Rovers	1–1	Wigan Athletic	26 November 1966
Replay	Wigan Athletic	0–1	Tranmere Rovers	28 November 1966
22	Wycombe Wanderers	1–1	Bedford Town	26 November 1966
Replay	Bedford Town	3–3	Wycombe Wanderers	30 November 1966
Replay	Wycombe Wanderers	1–1	Bedford Town	5 December 1966
Replay	Bedford Town	3–2	Wycombe Wanderers	8 December 1966
23	Oxford City	2–2	Bristol Rovers	26 November 1966
Replay	Bristol Rovers	4–0	Oxford City	29 November 1966
24	Queens Park Rangers	3–2	Poole Town	26 November 1966
25	Barnsley	3–1	Southport	26 November 1966
26	Brentford	1–0	Chelmsford City	26 November 1966
27	Bradford City	1–2	Port Vale	26 November 1966
28	Oldham Athletic	3–1	Notts County	26 November 1966
29	Bradford Park Avenue	3–2	Witton Albion	26 November 1966
30	Exeter City	1–1	Luton Town	26 November 1966
Replay	Luton Town	2–0	Exeter City	1 December 1966
31	Mansfield Town	4–1	Bangor City	26 November 1966
32	Halifax Town	2–2	Doncaster Rovers	26 November 1966
Replay	Doncaster Rovers	1–3	Halifax Town	29 November 1966
33	Newport County	1–2	Brighton & Hove Albion	26 November 1966
34	Wealdstone	0–2	Nuneaton Borough	26 November 1966
35	York City	0–0	Morecambe	26 November 1966
Replay	Morecambe	1–1	York City	30 November 1966
Replay	York City	1–0	Morecambe	8 December 1966
36	Aldershot	2–1	Torquay United	26 November 1966
37	Peterborough United	4–1	Hereford United	26 November 1966
38	South Shields	1–4	Workington	26 November 1966
39	Hendon	1–3	Reading	26 November 1966
40	Orient	2–1	Lowestoft Town	26 November 1966

=== Second round proper ===
The matches were scheduled for Saturday, 7 January 1967. Five matches were drawn, with replays taking place later the same week. The Middlesbrough–York City match required a second game to settle the contest. This was the last time that the Second Round of the FA Cup was scheduled for January, rather than the typical December.

Tie no	Home team	Score	Away team	Date
1	Enfield	2–4	Watford	7 January 1967
2	Barrow	2–1	Tranmere Rovers	7 January 1967
3	Bath City	0–5	Brighton & Hove Albion	7 January 1967
4	Grantham	0–4	Oldham Athletic	7 January 1967
5	Walsall	3–1	Gillingham	7 January 1967
6	Crewe Alexandra	2–1	Darlington	7 January 1967
7	Middlesbrough	1–1	York City	7 January 1967
Replay	York City	0–0	Middlesbrough	11 January 1967
Replay	Middlesbrough	4–1	York City	16 January 1967
8	Swindon Town	5–0	Ashford Town (Kent)	10 January 1967
9	Shrewsbury Town	5–1	Wrexham	7 January 1967
10	Bishop Auckland	0–0	Halifax Town	7 January 1967
Replay	Halifax Town	7–0	Bishop Auckland	10 January 1967
11	Queens Park Rangers	2–0	Bournemouth & Boscombe Athletic	7 January 1967
12	Barnsley	1–1	Port Vale	7 January 1967
Replay	Port Vale	1–3	Barnsley	16 January 1967
13	Bristol Rovers	3–2	Luton Town	7 January 1967
14	Bradford Park Avenue	3–1	Workington	11 January 1967
15	Mansfield Town	2–1	Scunthorpe United	7 January 1967
16	Aldershot	1–0	Reading	16 January 1967
17	Colchester United	0–3	Peterborough United	7 January 1967
18	Nuneaton Borough	2–0	Swansea Town	7 January 1967
19	Oxford United	1–1	Bedford Town	11 January 1967
Replay	Bedford Town	1–0	Oxford United	16 January 1967
20	Orient	0–0	Brentford	7 January 1967
Replay	Brentford	3–1	Orient	10 January 1967

=== Third round proper ===
The 44 First and Second Division clubs entered the competition at this stage. The matches were scheduled for Saturday, 28 January 1967. Eleven matches were drawn and went to midweek replays, with Hull City and Portsmouth requiring a second replay at Highfield Road on the following Monday. Bedford Town and Nuneaton Borough were the last non-league clubs left in the competition.

Tie no	Home team	Score	Away team	Date
1	Barrow	2–2	Southampton	28 January 1967
Replay	Southampton	3–0	Barrow	1 February 1967
2	Burnley	0–0	Everton	28 January 1967
Replay	Everton	2–1	Burnley	31 January 1967
3	Bury	2–0	Walsall	28 January 1967
4	Preston North End	0–1	Aston Villa	28 January 1967
5	Watford	0–0	Liverpool	28 January 1967
Replay	Liverpool	3–1	Watford	1 February 1967
6	Nottingham Forest	2–1	Plymouth Argyle	28 January 1967
7	Blackburn Rovers	1–2	Carlisle United	28 January 1967
8	Sheffield Wednesday	3–0	Queens Park Rangers	28 January 1967
9	Bolton Wanderers	1–0	Crewe Alexandra	28 January 1967
10	Sunderland	5–2	Brentford	28 January 1967
11	Ipswich Town	4–1	Shrewsbury Town	28 January 1967
12	Manchester City	2–1	Leicester City	28 January 1967
13	Barnsley	1–1	Cardiff City	28 January 1967
Replay	Cardiff City	2–1	Barnsley	31 January 1967
14	Bristol Rovers	0–3	Arsenal	28 January 1967
15	Northampton Town	1–3	West Bromwich Albion	28 January 1967
16	Coventry City	3–4	Newcastle United	28 January 1967
17	West Ham United	3–3	Swindon Town	28 January 1967
Replay	Swindon Town	3–1	West Ham United	31 January 1967
18	Manchester United	2–0	Stoke City	28 January 1967
19	Norwich City	3–0	Derby County	28 January 1967
20	Millwall	0–0	Tottenham Hotspur	28 January 1967
Replay	Tottenham Hotspur	1–0	Millwall	1 February 1967
21	Hull City	1–1	Portsmouth	28 January 1967
Replay	Portsmouth	2–2	Hull City	1 February 1967
Replay	Hull City	1–3	Portsmouth	6 February 1967
22	Oldham Athletic	2–2	Wolverhampton Wanderers	28 January 1967
Replay	Wolverhampton Wanderers	4–1	Oldham Athletic	1 February 1967
23	Bradford Park Avenue	1–3	Fulham	28 January 1967
24	Huddersfield Town	1–2	Chelsea	28 January 1967
25	Bedford Town	2–6	Peterborough United	28 January 1967
26	Mansfield Town	2–0	Middlesbrough	28 January 1967
27	Halifax Town	1–1	Bristol City	28 January 1967
Replay	Bristol City	4–1	Halifax Town	31 January 1967
28	Charlton Athletic	0–1	Sheffield United	28 January 1967
29	Leeds United	3–0	Crystal Palace	28 January 1967
30	Aldershot	0–0	Brighton & Hove Albion	28 January 1967
Replay	Brighton & Hove Albion	3–1	Aldershot	1 February 1967
31	Birmingham City	2–1	Blackpool	28 January 1967
32	Nuneaton Borough	1–1	Rotherham United	28 January 1967
Replay	Rotherham United	1–0	Nuneaton Borough	31 January 1967

=== Fourth round proper ===
The matches were scheduled for Saturday, 18 February 1967. Six matches were drawn and went to replays. The replays were all played three or four days later, except for the Fulham–Sheffield United match which was settled on 1 March.

Tie no	Home team	Score	Away team	Date
1	Bristol City	1–0	Southampton	18 February 1967
2	Liverpool	1–0	Aston Villa	18 February 1967
3	Nottingham Forest	3–0	Newcastle United	18 February 1967
4	Sheffield Wednesday	4–0	Mansfield Town	18 February 1967
5	Bolton Wanderers	0–0	Arsenal	18 February 1967
Replay	Arsenal	3–0	Bolton Wanderers	22 February 1967
6	Wolverhampton Wanderers	1–1	Everton	18 February 1967
Replay	Everton	3–1	Wolverhampton Wanderers	21 February 1967
7	Sunderland	7–1	Peterborough United	18 February 1967
8	Swindon Town	2–1	Bury	18 February 1967
9	Ipswich Town	2–0	Carlisle United	18 February 1967
10	Tottenham Hotspur	3–1	Portsmouth	18 February 1967
11	Fulham	1–1	Sheffield United	18 February 1967
Replay	Sheffield United	3–1	Fulham	1 March 1967
12	Brighton & Hove Albion	1–1	Chelsea	18 February 1967
Replay	Chelsea	4–0	Brighton & Hove Albion	22 February 1967
13	Manchester United	1–2	Norwich City	18 February 1967
14	Cardiff City	1–1	Manchester City	18 February 1967
Replay	Manchester City	3–1	Cardiff City	22 February 1967
15	Leeds United	5–0	West Bromwich Albion	18 February 1967
16	Rotherham United	0–0	Birmingham City	18 February 1967
Replay	Birmingham City	2–1	Rotherham United	21 February 1967

=== Fifth round proper ===
The matches were scheduled for Saturday, 11 March 1967. Three games required replays three or four days later, and only one of these replays finished not in a draw. The second replays took place on 20 March.

Tie no	Home team	Score	Away team	Date
1	Nottingham Forest	0–0	Swindon Town	11 March 1967
Replay	Swindon Town	1–1	Nottingham Forest	14 March 1967
Replay	Nottingham Forest	3–0	Swindon Town	20 March 1967
2	Sunderland	1–1	Leeds United	11 March 1967
Replay	Leeds United	1–1	Sunderland	15 March 1967
Replay	Sunderland	1–2	Leeds United	20 March 1967
3	Everton	1–0	Liverpool	11 March 1967
4	Tottenham Hotspur	2–0	Bristol City	11 March 1967
5	Manchester City	1–1	Ipswich Town	11 March 1967
Replay	Ipswich Town	0–3	Manchester City	14 March 1967
6	Norwich City	1–3	Sheffield Wednesday	11 March 1967
7	Chelsea	2–0	Sheffield United	11 March 1967
8	Birmingham City	1–0	Arsenal	11 March 1967

=== Sixth round proper ===
The four quarter-final ties were scheduled to be played on 8 April 1967. The Tottenham–Birmingham City game was replayed four days later following a draw.

Tie no	Home team	Score	Away team	Date
1	Nottingham Forest	3–2	Everton	8 April 1967
2	Chelsea	1–0	Sheffield Wednesday	8 April 1967
3	Leeds United	1–0	Manchester City	8 April 1967
4	Birmingham City	0–0	Tottenham Hotspur	8 April 1967
Replay	Tottenham Hotspur	6–0	Birmingham City	12 April 1967

=== Semi-finals ===
The semi-final matches were played on Saturday, 29 April 1967 with no replays required. Spurs and Chelsea came through the semi-final round to meet at Wembley.

29 April 1967
15:00

Tottenham Hotspur	2–1	Nottingham Forest
Greaves 30'; Saul 70'	Report	Hennessey 75'

Hillsborough, Sheffield
Attendance: 55,000
Referee: Frank Cowen, Oldham
29 April 1967
15:00

Chelsea	1–0	Leeds United
Hateley 42'	Report

Villa Park, Birmingham
Attendance: 62,738
Referee: Ken Burns, Dudley

=== Final ===
The 1967 FA Cup Final was contested by Tottenham Hotspur and Chelsea at Wembley on Saturday 20 May 1967. The match was the first ever all-London final and finished 2–1 to Spurs.

20 May 1967

Tottenham Hotspur	2 – 1	Chelsea
Robertson 40'; Saul 67'		Tambling 85'

Wembley Stadium, London
Attendance: 100,000
Referee: Ken Dagnall

Tottenham Hotspur	Chelsea
