= Frank Saul (footballer) =

English footballer

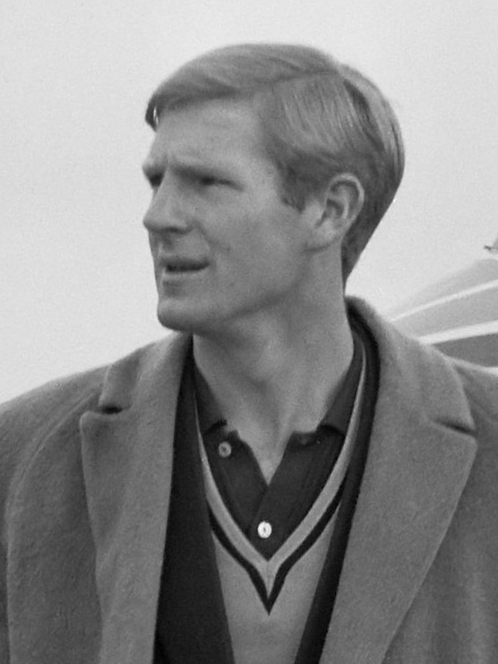

Personal information
- Full name: Frank Lander Saul
- Date of birth: 23 August 1943 (age 83)
- Place of birth: Canvey Island, Essex, England
- Height: 5 ft 10 in (1.78 m)
- Position: Forward

Youth career
- Canvey Island

Senior career*
Years	Team	Apps	(Gls)
1960–1968	Tottenham Hotspur	116	(37)
1968–1970	Southampton	50	(2)
1970–1972	Queens Park Rangers	43	(4)
1972–1976	Millwall	96	(4)
- Dagenham
Total		305	(47)
- * Club domestic league appearances and goals

Frank Lander Saul (born 23 August 1943) is an English former professional footballer who played most of his career as a forward for Tottenham Hotspur.

== Playing career ==
Having started as a youth with Canvey island, Saul signed for Spurs in 1960, and was one of 17 players used by the club in the Double winning side of 1960–61. He made his debut on 7 September 1960 in a 2–1 win away to Bolton Wanderers, at the age of 17 years and 15 days, making him at the time Spurs' youngest debutant. When he scored against Arsenal in a 3–2 away victory three days later, on 10 September 1960, Saul became Tottenham Hotspur’s youngest ever goal scorer at 17 years and 18 days, a title he would retain for more than 60 years until Alfie Devine scored an FA Cup goal on 10 January 2021. Saul is still (as at 2025) Spurs’ youngest scorer in a league game. When he played against Feyenoord in the European Cup in November 1961, he became Spurs' youngest player in that competition, a title he would hold until March 2020.

When Saul was sent off against Burnley at Turf Moor on 4 December 1965, he was the first Spurs' player to be sent off in a League match since October 1928.

Saul scored in the 1967 FA Cup Final win over Chelsea. In 1968, he was part of the swap with Southampton for Martin Chivers, where he was valued at £45,000 as makeweight in a deal worth a then British record £125,000. Saul joined Queens Park Rangers in 1970 and played 43 league games, scoring 4 goals, before moving to Millwall in 1972.

== Later life ==
After quitting football, Saul worked as a builder in Essex.

== Honours ==
Tottenham Hotspur

- Football League: 1960–61
- FA Cup: 1966–67
- FA Charity Shield: 1967 (shared)
