= Ken Dagnall =

English football referee (1921–1995)

- Full name: Kenneth Dagnall
- Born: 30 January 1921; Blackburn, England
- Died: 26 March 1995 (aged 74); Great Lever, Bolton, England
- Other occupation: Housing officer

Domestic
Years	League	Role
1955–1968	Football League	Referee

International
Years	League	Role
1962–1968	FIFA	Referee

Kenneth Dagnall (30 January 1921 – March 1995) was an English football referee, who officiated in the Football League and for FIFA, especially during the 1966 World Cup held in England. He was born in Blackburn and played as an amateur for Accrington Stanley. However it was as a referee that he was to make his name in football. Outside football he worked as housing officer in Bolton.

== Career ==
As a referee he worked his way through the Lancashire Combination to ultimately reach the Football League, initially as a linesman in 1954 and then promoted to the Referees List only one year later. During his time on the Football League List he was based in Bolton in Lancashire, latterly living in the Great Lever area of the town. He reached the international list by 1962. He took charge of two matches in the 1966 World Cup. The first was the 3–1 win by Hungary over Brazil in Group C at Goodison Park, Liverpool, on 15 July 1966. This was followed by the match for third place at Wembley on 28 July 1966, played between the losing semi-finalists, Portugal and the Soviet Union, and which the Portuguese won 2–1. It has been suggested that he would have instead refereed the World Cup Final of that year if England had been eliminated from the tournament.

Domestically, he was then selected to handle the 1967 FA Cup Final at Wembley on 20 May 1967, when Tottenham Hotspur beat Chelsea by 2 goals to 1. Shortly after his retirement in 1968 he suggested in the Bolton Evening News that a band of around fifteen referees should take charge of the most important matches, allowing them a greater number of games at the top level. This did not occur at the time but a similar system now operates in English professional football.

Preceded by Jack Taylor	FA Cup Final Referee; 1967	Succeeded by Leo Callaghan
