= Dino Zoff =

Italian footballer (born 1942)

Dino Zoff OMRI
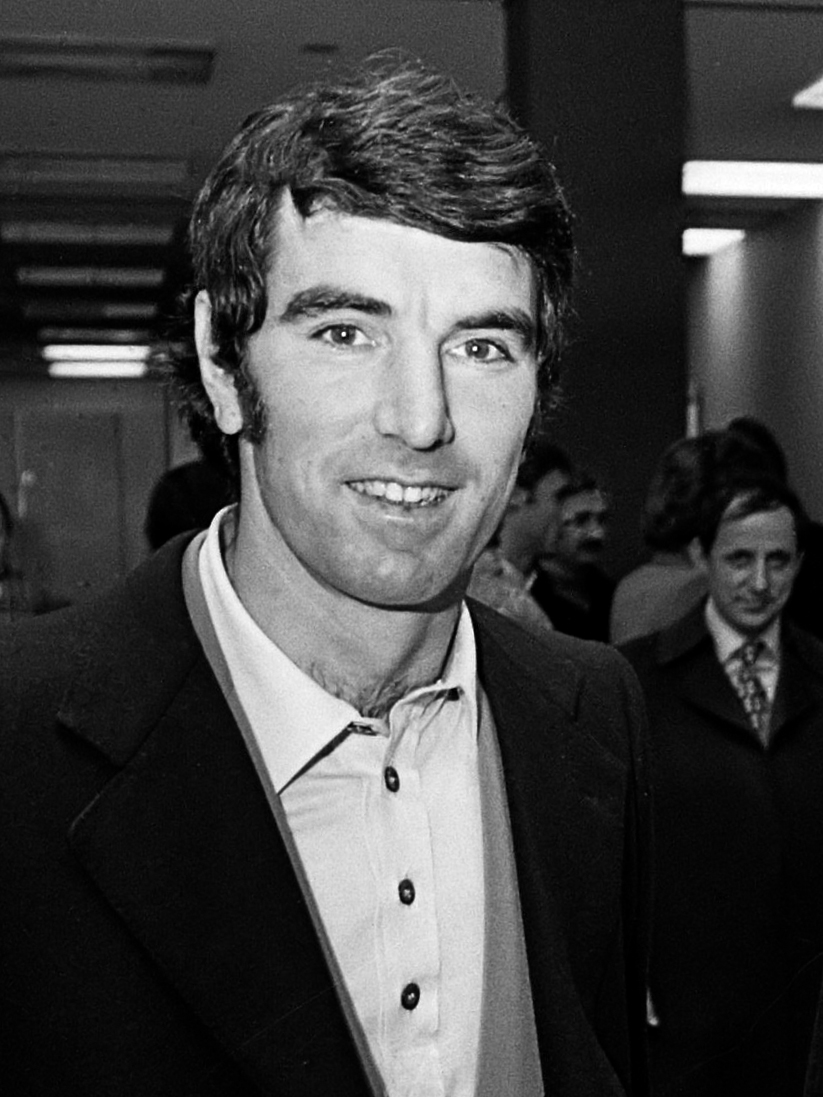
- Zoff in 1974

Personal information
- Full name: Dino Zoff
- Date of birth: 28 February 1942 (age 84)
- Place of birth: Mariano del Friuli, Italy
- Height: 1.82 m (6 ft 0 in)
- Position: Goalkeeper

Senior career*
Years	Team	Apps	(Gls)
1961–1963	Udinese	38	(0)
1963–1967	Mantova	131	(0)
1967–1972	Napoli	143	(0)
1972–1983	Juventus	330	(0)
Total		642	(0)

International career
1968–1983	Italy	112	(0)

Managerial career
- 1988–1990: Juventus
- 1990–1994: Lazio
- 1997: Lazio
- 1998–2000: Italy
- 2001: Lazio
- 2005: Fiorentina
Medal record
Men's football
Representing Italy (as player)
FIFA World Cup
Winner	1982 Spain
Runner-up	1970 Mexico
UEFA European Championship
Winner	1968 Italy
Mediterranean Games
Winner	1963 Naples
Men's football (as coach)
Runner-up	2000 Belgium-Netherlands
- * Club domestic league appearances and goals

Dino Zoff (Italian pronunciation: [ˈdiːno dˈdzɔf]; born 28 February 1942) is an Italian former professional footballer who played as a goalkeeper. Regarded as one of the greatest goalkeepers of all time, he is the oldest ever winner of the World Cup, which he lifted as captain of the Italy national team in the 1982 tournament, at the age of 40 years, 4 months and 13 days. He also won the award for best goalkeeper of the tournament and was elected to the team of the tournament for his performances, keeping two clean-sheets, an honour he also received after winning the 1968 European Championship on home soil. Zoff is the only Italian player to have won both the World Cup and the European Championship. He also achieved great club success with Juventus, winning six Serie A titles, two Coppa Italia titles, and a UEFA Cup, also reaching two European Champions' Cup finals in the 1972–73 and 1982–83 seasons, as well as finishing second in the 1973 Intercontinental Cup final.

Zoff was a goalkeeper of outstanding ability, and he has a place in the history of the sport among the very best in this role, named the third greatest goalkeeper of the 20th century by the IFFHS behind Lev Yashin and Gordon Banks. He holds the record for the longest playing time without allowing goals in international tournaments (1,142 minutes) set between 1972 and 1974. Haiti's Emmanuel Sanon ended the streak at the 1974 FIFA World Cup, in the Haiti–Italy group match. With 112 caps, he is the eighth most capped player for the Italy national team. In 2004, Pelé named Zoff as one of the 100 greatest living footballers. In the same year, Zoff placed fifth in the UEFA Golden Jubilee Poll, and was elected as Italy's golden player of the past 50 years. He also placed second in the 1973 Ballon d'Or, as he narrowly missed out on a treble with Juventus. In 1999, Zoff placed 47th in World Soccer magazine's 100 Greatest Players of the Twentieth Century.

After retiring as a footballer, Zoff went on to pursue a managerial career, coaching the Italy national team, with which he reached the Euro 2000 final, losing to France, and several Italian club teams, including his former club Juventus, with which he won an UEFA Cup and a Coppa Italia double during the 1989–90 season, trophies he had also won as a player. In September 2014, Zoff published his Italian autobiography Dura solo un attimo, la gloria.

== Early life ==
Dino Zoff was born in Mariano del Friuli, Friuli-Venezia Giulia, Italy into a farming family. Upon his father's suggestion, Zoff initially also pursued studies to be a mechanic in case his football career proved to be unsuccessful. As a young aspiring footballer, Zoff was also interested in other sports, and his two main role models were the cyclist Fausto Coppi, and the race walker Abdon Pamich.

== Club career ==
=== Udinese, Mantova and Napoli ===
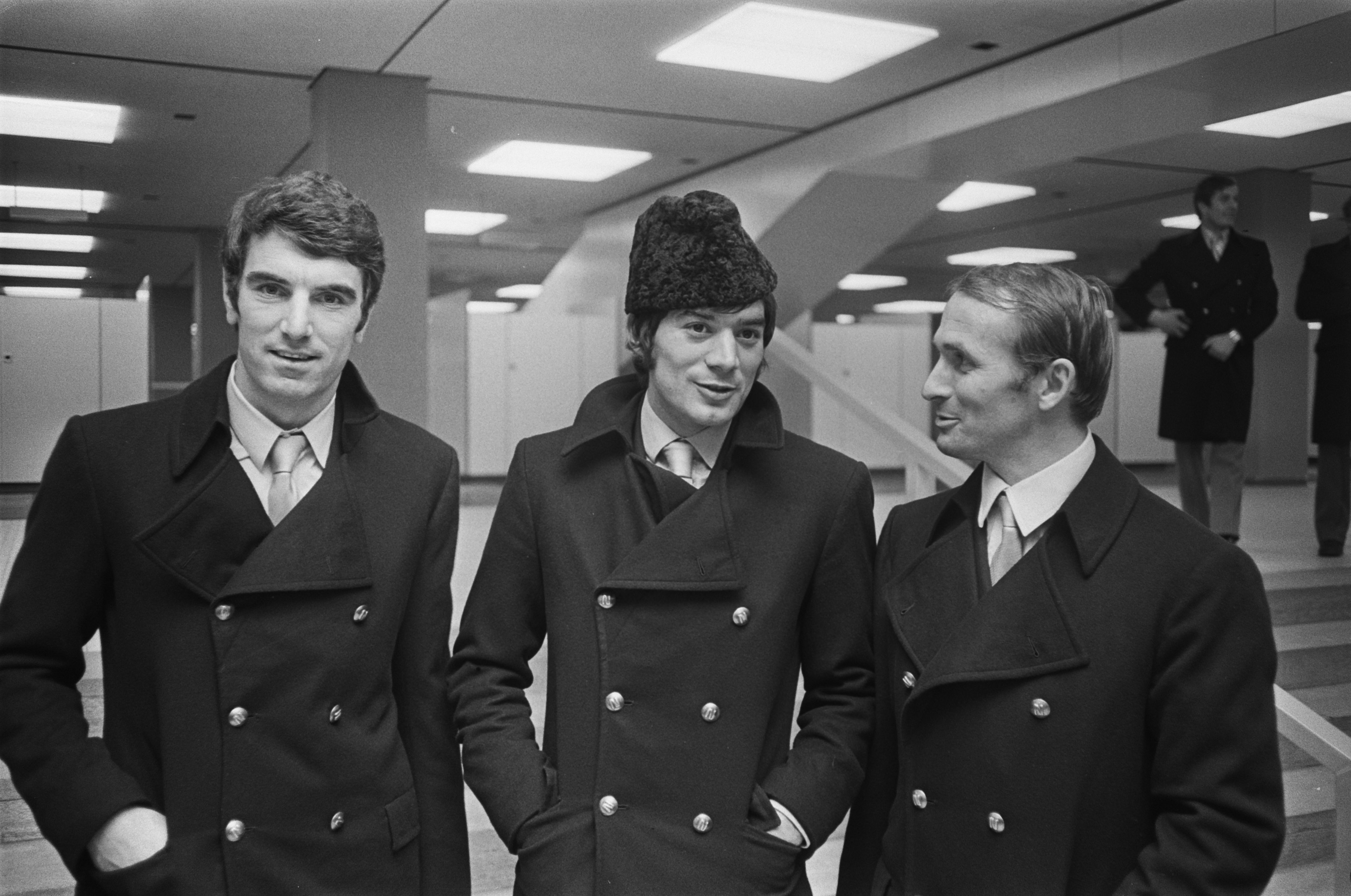
Zoff (left) with Napoli in January 1970, beside Antonio Juliano and Kurt Hamrin, at Schiphol for the match of Inter-Cities Fairs Cup versus Ajax Amsterdam.

Zoff's career got off to an inauspicious start, when at the age of fourteen he had trials with Inter Milan and Juventus, but was rejected due to a lack of height. Five years later, having grown by 33 centimetres (supposedly due to his grandmother Adelaide's recommended increased daily intake of eight eggs), he made his Serie A debut with Udinese on 24 September 1961, in a 5–2 defeat to Fiorentina, although Zoff was not criticised for any of the goals he conceded. Zoff made only four appearances in his first season for Udinese, as they were relegated to Serie B. He played the next season as the club's starting goalkeeper, helping the club to Serie A promotion, before moving to Mantova in 1963, where he spent four seasons, making 131 appearances.

His performances for Mantova in the top flight caught the attention of larger clubs, while Italy's national coach at the time, Edmondo Fabbri, even considered bringing him as a back-up for the 1966 FIFA World Cup, although he ultimately chose to bring Enrico Albertosi, Roberto Anzolin, and Pierluigi Pizzaballa instead. In 1967, Zoff was transferred to Napoli, in exchange for fellow goalkeeper Claudio Bandoni, and a transfer fee of 130 million Lire; he spent five seasons in Naples, making 143 Serie A appearances with the club. During this time, he began to achieve increasing recognition in Italy, also making his International debut with the Italy national side in 1968, and earning a place in Italy's squads at Euro 68 and the 1970 World Cup. He played in all 3 of Italy's matches in Euro 1968, saving two penalties in the penalty shoot-out in semi-final, and keeping a clean sheet in the replay of the final as Italy won the championship. He did not play in the 1970 world cup final when Italy lost 4-1 to Brazil, as Albertosi was preferred, keeping Zoff on the substitutes' bench.

=== Juventus ===
Following his achievements with the national side, and due to his performances during his time with Napoli, Zoff was signed by Juventus in 1972, at the age of 30, where he resumed his success. In eleven years with Juventus, Zoff won the Serie A championship six times, the Coppa Italia twice and the UEFA Cup once, also reaching two European Cup finals, another semi-final in 1978 (during which Zoff played a decisive role in the club's shoot-out victory over Ajax in the quarter-finals by saving two penalties), and the semi-finals of the European Cup Winners' Cup during the 1979–80 season. In 1973, he placed second in the Ballon d'Or, following his Serie A title victory, also narrowly missing out on an historical treble with Juventus, after reaching both the European Cup and the Coppa Italia finals that season, in which his club were defeated, however; Juventus also finished as runners-up in the 1973 Intercontinental Cup that year. In winning the 1977 UEFA Cup final against Athletic Bilbao, Zoff came out on top against his 'twin', the Basque goalkeeper José Ángel Iribar.

Overall, Zoff made 479 appearances for Juventus in all competitions, making 330 Serie A appearances with the club (all of which came consecutively, a club record), 74 in the Coppa Italia, 71 in European competitions, and 4 in other club competitions. He is currently Juventus's 6th record appearance holder in all competitions, their 7th all-time appearance holder in Serie A, their 3rd all-time appearance holder in the Coppa Italia, their 7th all-time appearance holder in UEFA club competitions, and their 9th all-time appearance holder in international club competitions.

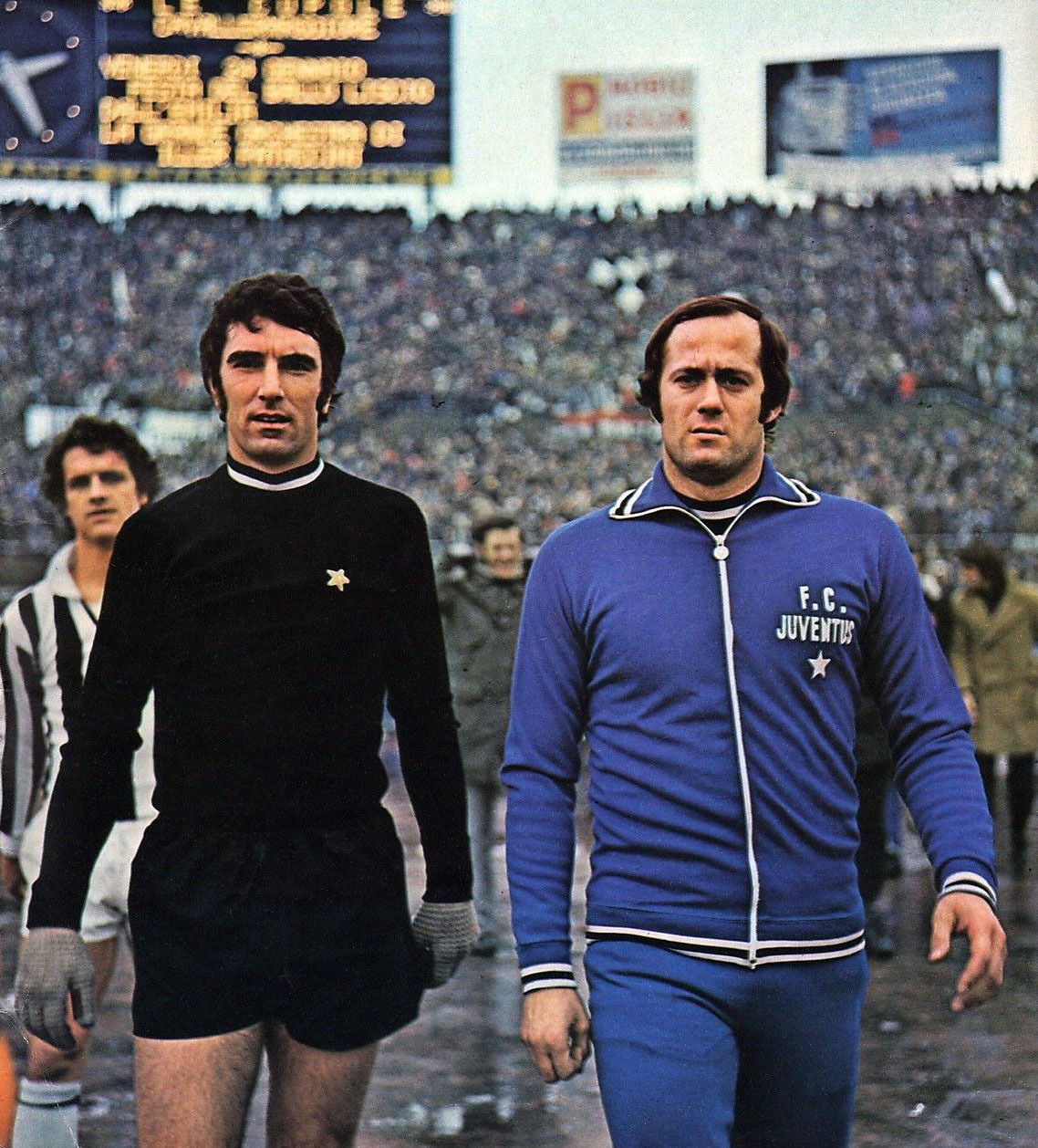
Zoff (left) with Juventus in 1975, beside his historical understudy Massimo Piloni; on background, teammate Fabio Capello.

Zoff won his final Serie A championship with Juventus during the 1981–82 Serie A season, also winning the 1982 FIFA World Cup with Italy that year, as his team's captain. During the following 1982–83 season, the final season of his career, Dino Zoff won the Coppa Italia with defending Serie A champions Juventus, and he reached his second European Cup final with the club in 1983; Juventus were defeated 1–0 by Hamburg in Athens on 25 May, after Zoff was beaten by Felix Magath's long-distance strike; this was the final club match of his career. His final league appearance came in a 4–2 home win over Genoa on 15 May 1983.

=== Club records ===
Upon retirement, Zoff held the records for the oldest Serie A player, at the age of 41, and the most Serie A appearances (570 matches) for more than 20 years, until the 2005–06 season, when the records were broken by Lazio goalkeeper Marco Ballotta, and AC Milan defender Paolo Maldini respectively. Behind only former AC Milan goalkeeper Sebastiano Rossi, who overtook him during the 1993–94 season, Zoff has conceded the fewest goals in a single Serie A season; behind only Gianluigi Buffon and Sebastiano Rossi, he has also gone the most time unbeaten in Serie A without conceding a goal, producing a 903-minute unbeaten streak during the 1972–73 season, a record that stood until Rossi overtook him in the 1993–94 season; (Note: Gianpiero Combi's Italian league record unbeaten streak of 934 consecutive minutes without conceding a goal was set during the 1925–26 Prima Divisione season, prior to the establishment of the Serie A in the 1929–30 season.) Buffon broke the record during the 2015–16 season. He also held the Serie A record for most consecutive clean sheets alongside Rossi (9), until Gianluigi Buffon overtook them both with his 10th consecutive clean sheet in 2016. With 570 Serie A appearances, Zoff is also the sixth highest appearance holder in Serie A of all time, and he is the fourth oldest player in Serie A to have ever played a match. He holds the record for most consecutive matches played in Serie A (332), a streak which went unbroken from 21 May 1972 (in a 0–0 home draw with Napoli against Bologna), until his final league appearance with Juventus in 1983. At 41 years and 86 days, Zoff is also the oldest player to have appeared in a European Cup or UEFA Champions League final.

== International career ==
Prior to representing the senior Italian side, Zoff had won a gold medal with the Italy under-23 side at the 1963 Mediterranean Football Games. On 20 April 1968, Zoff made his senior debut for Italy, playing in a 2–0 win against Bulgaria in the quarter finals of the 1968 European Championships, in Naples. Zoff ended up being promoted to starting goalkeeper over his perceived career rival Enrico Albertosi during the tournament, and Italy proceeded to win the European Championship on home soil, with Zoff taking home a winners' medal after only his fourth international appearance, keeping two clean sheets, and winning the award for the best goalkeeper of the tournament. Zoff was left out of the Italian starting eleven in the 1970 World Cup, and was Albertosi's deputy throughout the tournament, as Italy went on to reach the final of the World Cup, and were defeated 4–1 by Brazil. He returned to the starting line-up, however, ahead of Albertosi, in Italy's disappointing 1974 World Cup campaign, in which they were eliminated in the first round.

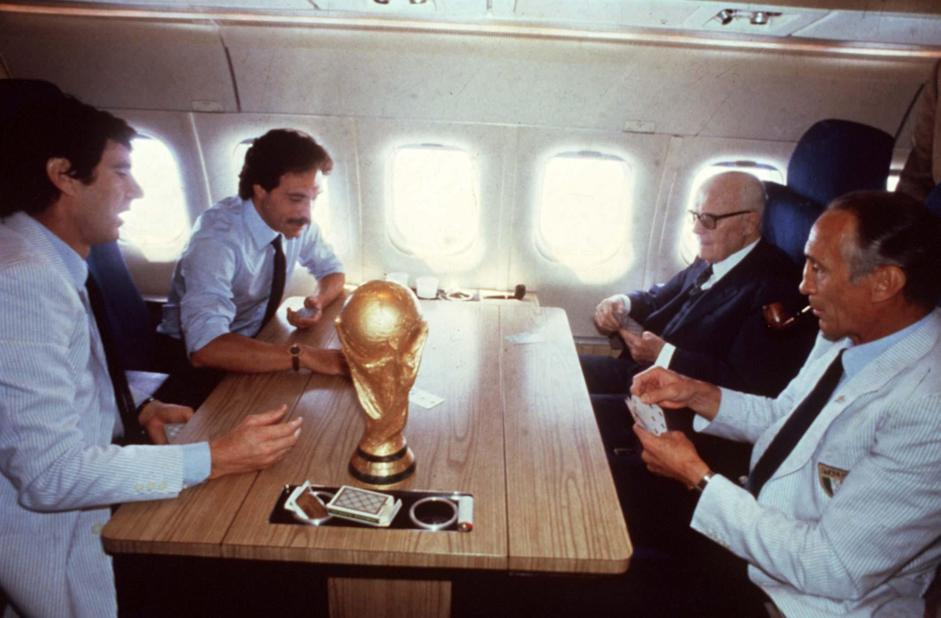
Franco Causio, the Italian president Sandro Pertini, Zoff (lower left) and the coach Enzo Bearzot on their return from Spain with the 1982 World Cup they just won.

From 1972 onwards, Zoff became Italy's undisputed number 1, and he participated in the 1978 World Cup with Italy, during which he managed a fourth-place finish, keeping 3 clean-sheets. Italy were eliminated in the semi-final, in a 2–1 loss to the Netherlands. After the match, Zoff was criticised for making a fairly uncommon error, as he was beaten by a strike from distance by Arie Haan. Zoff was also Italy's starting goalkeeper once again at the 1980 European Championships on home soil, however, helping his side to finish the tournament in fourth place once again. During the 1980 European Championship, Zoff kept three clean sheets, only conceding one goal in the bronze medal match, which Italy would lose on penalties; Zoff was elected as the goalkeeper of the tournament once again, an honour he had previously managed after winning the tournament in 1968. Throughout these two tournaments, Zoff established a record for most consecutive minutes unbeaten in a European Championship, which was later beaten by Iker Casillas in 2012. Zoff had also established the record for most minutes unbeaten European Championship qualifying, which was also beaten, by compatriot Buffon in 2011. He still holds the record, however, for most consecutive minutes without conceding a goal at the European Championships including qualifying, having kept eight consecutive cleans sheets between 1975 and 1980, while going unbeaten for 784 minutes. Alongside Casillas, Buffon, and Thomas Myhre, he is the goalkeeper with the fewest goals conceded in a single edition of the European Championships, having conceded only one goal in the 1968 European Championships; of these players, only Zoff and Casillas won the title while achieving this feat.

Zoff's greatest accomplishment, however, came in the 1982 World Cup in Spain, where he captained Italy to victory in the tournament at the age of 40, making him the oldest ever winner of the World Cup; throughout the tournament, he kept two clean sheets, and produced a crucial goal-line save in the final minutes of the last second-round group match against favourites Brazil on 5 July, which enabled the Italians to earn a 3–2 victory and advance to the semi-finals of the competition. On 11 July, at the age of 40 years and 133 days, he became the oldest player ever to feature in a World Cup final; following Italy's 3–1 victory over West Germany at the Santiago Bernabéu Stadium in Madrid, he followed in the footsteps of compatriot Gianpiero Combi (1934) as only the second goalkeeper to captain a World Cup-winning side (later Iker Casillas and Hugo Lloris repeated this feat for Spain and France in the 2010 and 2018 World Cups respectively). Due to his performances, he was voted as the Best Goalkeeper of the Tournament. Regarding Zoff's importance during Italy's victorious World Cup campaign, his manager Enzo Bearzot said of him:

He was a level-headed goalkeeper, capable of staying calm during the toughest and the most exhilarating moments. He always held back both out of modesty and respect for his opponents. At the end of the Brazil match, he came over to give me a kiss on the cheek, without saying a single word. For me, that fleeting moment was the most intense of the entire World Cup.

During the flight of return from Spain on a DC-9 airplane, Zoff, Sandro Pertini (the Italian President of Republic), Causio and Bearzot were immortalized in a photo, suddenly gone highly popular, while playing card at scopone scientifico, an Italian social and team sport. In the previous years, the same aircraft had been used by Pertini and Pope John Paul II for private and institutional flights. In April 2017, it was put down back in the Museum of Volandia, near Varese.

Zoff also holds the record for the longest stretch (1,142 minutes) without allowing any goals in international football, set between 1972 and 1974. That clean sheet stretch was ended by Haitian player Manno Sanon's beautiful goal during Italy's 3–1 win over Haiti in the first round of the 1974 World Cup. Zoff made his final appearance for Italy on 29 May 1983, in a 2–0 away loss to Sweden, in a Euro 1984 qualifying match. At the time of his retirement, Zoff's 112 caps were the most ever by a member of the Italy national team. He currently sits in sixth place in this category, as well as second among goalkeepers, with Gianluigi Buffon having surpassed the latter record.

== Style of play ==
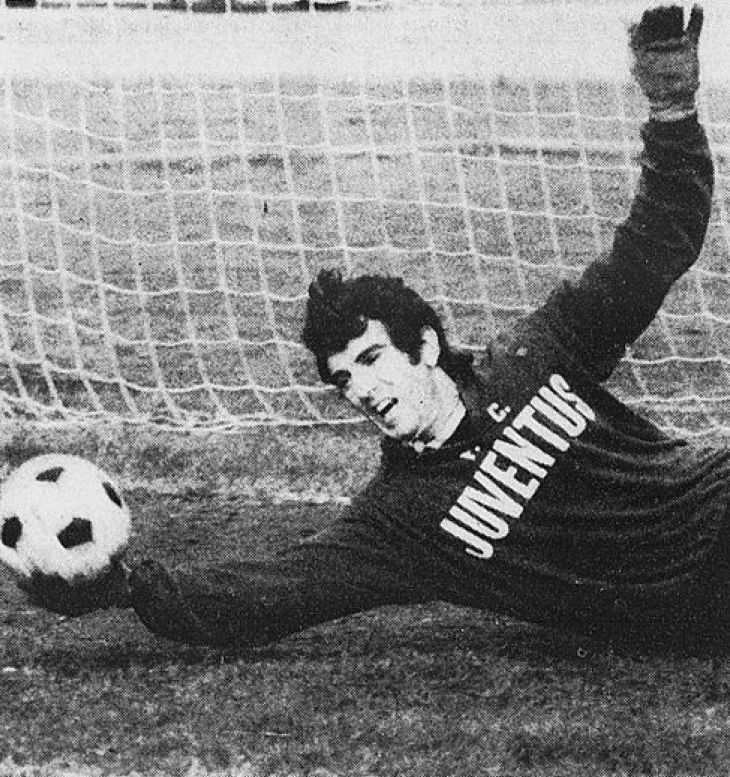
Zoff in training with Juventus, c. January 1973.

Zoff was a traditional, effective, and experienced goalkeeper, who usually favoured efficiency and caution over flamboyance and making saves, although he was also capable of producing spectacular dives and decisive saves when necessary due to his strength and athleticism. He was particularly regarded for his outstanding positioning and handling of the ball, in particular when coming out to collect crosses, as well as his concentration, consistency, calm mindset, and composure under pressure; he was also an elegant player, who possessed good reactions and excellent shot-stopping abilities. Zoff was also noted for his attention to detail during matches, as well as his ability to read the game, anticipate his opponents, communicate with his defenders, and organise his back-line, which also enabled him to start attacking plays quickly from the back after claiming the ball. Despite his serious and reserved character, Zoff also drew praise for his leadership skills, correct behaviour, and competitive spirit, which led him to serve as captain of his national side, and enabled him to inspire a sense of calmness and confidence in his teammates. On occasion, however, Zoff was accused by certain pundits of occasionally struggling when facing long-range shots, and for not always being particularly adept at stopping penalties. Known for his work-rate in training, dedication, and discipline as a footballer, in addition to his goalkeeping skills, Zoff also stood out for his stamina, longevity, and determination, which enabled him to avoid injuries and have an extensive and highly successful career; due to his constant desire to improve himself, he was able to maintain a consistent level of performance throughout his entire career, even with his advancing age towards the end of his career, into his late 30s and early 40s. (Note: See) Considered one of the greatest goalkeepers of all time, in 1999 he was elected in a poll by the IFFHS as the third best goalkeeper of the 20th Century – after Lev Yashin (1st) and Gordon Banks (2nd) – as well as Italy's best keeper of the century, and the second best European keeper of the century – behind only Yashin.

== Coaching career ==
After his retirement as a player, Zoff went into coaching, joining the technical staff at Juventus, initially as a goalkeeping coach, although this experience proved to be unsatisfactory for him. He subsequently coached the Italian Olympic side, his first experience as a coach, helping the team to qualify for the 1988 Summer Olympic Games in Seoul, before returning to Juventus in a coaching role; the Italian Olympic side eventually managed a fourth-place finish in the final tournament. Zoff served as Juventus's head coach from 1988 to 1990. In 1990, he was sacked, however, despite winning the UEFA Cup and the Coppa Italia during the 1989–90 season, while also helping the club to a third-place finish in the league. He then joined Lazio, where he became the coach in 1994, and later the club's sporting director, winning the Coppa Italia in 1998, and helping the club to an UEFA Cup final the same season, and was defeated by compatriots Inter.

In 1998, Zoff was appointed as the head coach of the Italy national team. Although Italy were still cautious and organised defensively, Zoff used a more open, fluid, and attacking style of play than that used by his more defensive Italian coaching predecessors Cesare Maldini and Arrigo Sacchi. Zoff helped the team to qualify for Euro 2000, and he introduced several younger players to the team, such as Francesco Totti, Gianluca Zambrotta, Stefano Fiore, Massimo Ambrosini, Christian Abbiati, Marco Delvecchio, and Vincenzo Montella. Although Italy were not top favourites because of a young squad, he coached a young Italy squad to a second-place finish in Euro 2000, suffering a 2–1 extra-time defeat at the hands of reigning World Cup Champions France in the final, due to a golden goal by David Trezeguet. En route to the final, a ten-man Italy had eliminated co-hosts the Netherlands in the semi-finals in a penalty shoot-out, after a 0–0 draw, following extra-time, with a tightly contested defensive display against a more offensive-minded Dutch side. In the final of the tournament, Italy had been 1–0 up for most of the second half, and were less than sixty seconds away from winning the tournament, before France forward Sylvain Wiltord scored in the fourth and final minute of stoppage time to equalise, and send the match into extra time. Despite reaching the final, Zoff resigned a few days later, following strong criticism from AC Milan president and politician Silvio Berlusconi. Zoff was voted the World Soccer Manager of the Year in 2000.

Zoff returned to defending Serie A, Coppa Italia, and Supercoppa Italiana champions Lazio as a manager for the next season, replacing Sven-Göran Eriksson in 2001, and finishing third in Serie A. The following season, he resigned on 20 September, after only the third match, due to a poor start to the 2001–02 season. In 2005, he was named the coach of Fiorentina as a replacement for Sergio Buso. Despite saving the team from relegation on the last day of the season, Zoff was let go. This would be the final club he coached.

== Style of management ==
As a manager, Zoff was known for his use of tactics based upon the zona mista system (or "Gioco all'Italiana"), which was a cross between the catenaccio man-marking and zonal marking systems. Although he was initially known for fielding a 4–4–2 formation, at Euro 2000, he used a 5–2–1–2 system with Italy. His teams often used a sweeper, who, in addition to his defensive duties and organisational responsibilities, was also required to start plays from the back. He preferred not to base his team's play on set plays and formations, as he believed that cultivating a good relationship with his players and fostering a winning team mentality were the keys to getting the best out of them, and that this would also allow their natural creativity to come through in matches.

== Personal life and health ==
Zoff is married to Annamaria Passerini; they have a son, Marco, born in 1967. Zoff is Roman Catholic.

On 28 November 2015, it was reported Zoff was hospitalised for three weeks with a viral neurological infection, which made it difficult for him to walk. On 23 December 2015, it was reported Zoff had been recovering well, however stating, "For the first time in my life, I was actually afraid... When I say scared, I wasn't afraid for myself, but for those around me. My wife, my son, my grandchildren. My tribe, basically. I would've really hurt them by leaving." He also revealed, "One night I saw two figures at the end of my bed. They had the faces of Gaetano Scirea [one of his former, deceased teammates] and Enzo Bearzot [one of his former, deceased coaches]. They were both smiling. I wasn't asleep, it wasn't a dream. I told them: 'Not yet, not now.' And I am still here."

== Career statistics ==
=== Club ===
Appearances and goals by club, season and competition
Club	Season	League			Coppa Italia		Europe		Other		Total		Ref.
Club	Season	Division	Apps	Goals	Apps	Goals	Apps	Goals	Apps	Goals	Apps	Goals	Ref.
Udinese	1961–62	Serie A	4	0	0	0	—		—		4	0	
Udinese	1962–63	Serie B	36	0	1	0	—		—		36	0	
Udinese	Total		40	0	1	0	—		—		41	0	–
Mantova	1963–64	Serie A	27	0	0	0	—		—		27	0	
Mantova	1964–65	Serie A	32	0	1	0	—		—		33	0	
Mantova	1965–66	Serie B	38	0	1	0	—		—		39	0	
Mantova	1966–67	Serie A	34	0	1	0	—		—		35	0	
Mantova	Total		131	0	3	0	—		—		134	0	–
Napoli	1967–68	Serie A	30	0	2	0	4	0	—		36	0	
Napoli	1968–69	Serie A	30	0	5	0	3	0	—		38	0	
Napoli	1969–70	Serie A	30	0	3	0	6	0	—		39	0	
Napoli	1970–71	Serie A	30	0	11	0	—		—		41	0	
Napoli	1971–72	Serie A	23	0	11	0	2	0	—		36	0	
Napoli	Total		143	0	32	0	15	0	—		190	0	–
Juventus	1972–73	Serie A	30	0	11	0	9	0	—		50	0	
Juventus	1973–74	Serie A	30	0	9	0	2	0	1	0	42	0	
Juventus	1974–75	Serie A	30	0	10	0	10	0	—		50	0	
Juventus	1975–76	Serie A	30	0	4	0	4	0	—		38	0	
Juventus	1976–77	Serie A	30	0	5	0	12	0	—		47	0	
Juventus	1977–78	Serie A	30	0	4	0	7	0	—		41	0	
Juventus	1978–79	Serie A	30	0	9	0	2	0	—		41	0	
Juventus	1979–80	Serie A	30	0	4	0	8	0	—		42	0	
Juventus	1980–81	Serie A	30	0	8	0	4	0	3	0	45	0	
Juventus	1981–82	Serie A	30	0	4	0	4	0	—		38	0	
Juventus	1982–83	Serie A	30	0	6	0	9	0	—		45	0	
Juventus	Total		330	0	74	0	71	0	4	0	479	0	–
Career total			644	0	110	0	86	0	4	0	844	0	–

=== International ===
Appearances and goals by national team and year
National team	Year	Apps	Goals
Italy	1968	5	0
Italy	1969	4	0
Italy	1970	2	0
Italy	1971	6	0
Italy	1972	5	0
Italy	1973	8	0
Italy	1974	8	0
Italy	1975	7	0
Italy	1976	10	0
Italy	1977	6	0
Italy	1978	12	0
Italy	1979	4	0
Italy	1980	12	0
Italy	1981	7	0
Italy	1982	13	0
Italy	1983	3	0
Total		112	0

=== Managerial ===
Updated 8 March 2023

Team	Nation	From	To	M	W	D	L	Win %
Juventus	Italy	1 July 1988	30 June 1990	104	53	34	17	50.96
Lazio	Italy	1 July 1990	30 June 1994	154	57	58	39	37.01
Lazio	Italy	28 January 1997	3 June 1997	16	9	5	2	56.25
Italy	Italy	31 July 1998	4 July 2000	22	10	7	5	45.45
Lazio	Italy	9 January 2001	30 September 2001	32	17	8	7	53.13
Fiorentina	Italy	25 January 2005	7 June 2005	20	5	7	8	25.00
Total				348	151	119	78	43.39

== Honours ==
=== Player ===
Juventus

- Serie A: 1972–73, 1974–75, 1976–77, 1977–78, 1980–81, 1981–82
- Coppa Italia: 1978–79, 1982–83
- UEFA Cup: 1976–77
- Intercontinental Cup: Runner-up: 1973
- European Cup: Runner-up: 1972–73, 1982–83

Italy

- FIFA World Cup: 1982, Runner-up: 1970
- UEFA European Championship: 1968

=== Manager ===
Juventus

- Coppa Italia: 1989–90
- UEFA Cup: 1989–90

Italy

- UEFA European Championship: Runner-up: 2000

=== Individual ===
Player

- UEFA European Championship Team of the Tournament: 1968, 1980
- Ballon d'Or: 1973 (2nd place)
- FIFA World Cup All-Star Team: 1982
- FIFA Order of Merit: 1984
- FIFA World Cup Best Goalkeeper: 1982
- FUWO European Team of the Season: 1968
- World XI: 1968, 1975
- Sport Ideal European XI: 1973, 1975
- IFFHS Italian Goalkeeper of the 20th Century: 1999
- IFFHS European Goalkeeper of the 20th Century (2nd): 1999
- IFFHS World Goalkeeper of the 20th Century (3rd): 1999
- World Soccer Magazine's 100 Greatest Players of the Twentieth Century: 1999
- November 2003: Italy's Golden Player – the best Italian player of the last 50 years, selected by the Italian Football Federation.
- UEFA Golden Jubilee Poll: #5
- FIFA 100
- Golden Foot "Football Legends" Award: 2004
- Inducted into the Italian Football Hall of Fame: 2012
- Inducted into the Walk of Fame of Italian sport: 2015
- IFFHS Legends
- Juventus FC Hall of Fame: 2025

Manager

- Seminatore d'oro: 1990
- World Soccer Manager of the Year: 2000

=== Orders ===
- 3rd Class / Commander: Commendatore Ordine al Merito della Repubblica Italiana: 1982
- 2nd Class / Grand Officer: Grande Ufficiale Ordine al Merito della Repubblica Italiana: 2000

=== Records ===
- FIFA World Cup: Oldest player to play in and win a final, at 40 years, 4 months and 13 days in 1982
- UEFA Champions League/European Cup: Oldest player to play in a final, at 41 years and 86 days in 1983
- Most consecutive appearances in Serie A with Juventus: 330 (1972–1983)
- Most consecutive appearances in Serie A: 332 (1972–1983)
- Longest period time without conceding a goal in international matches: 1142 minutes (1972–1974).
- Most consecutive minutes without conceding a goal at the European Championships including qualifying: 784 (1975–1980)
- Fewest goals conceded in a single edition of the European Championships: 1 (1968) (alongside Gianluigi Buffon, Iker Casillas, and Thomas Myhre)
- Fewest goals conceded in a single edition of the European Championships by a tournament-winning starting goalkeeper: 1 (1968) (alongside Iker Casillas)
- One of four goalkeepers to win the FIFA World Cup as captain: 1982 (alongside Gianpiero Combi, Iker Casillas, and Hugo Lloris)

== See also ==
- List of men's footballers with 100 or more international caps
