= List of Chelsea F.C. managers =

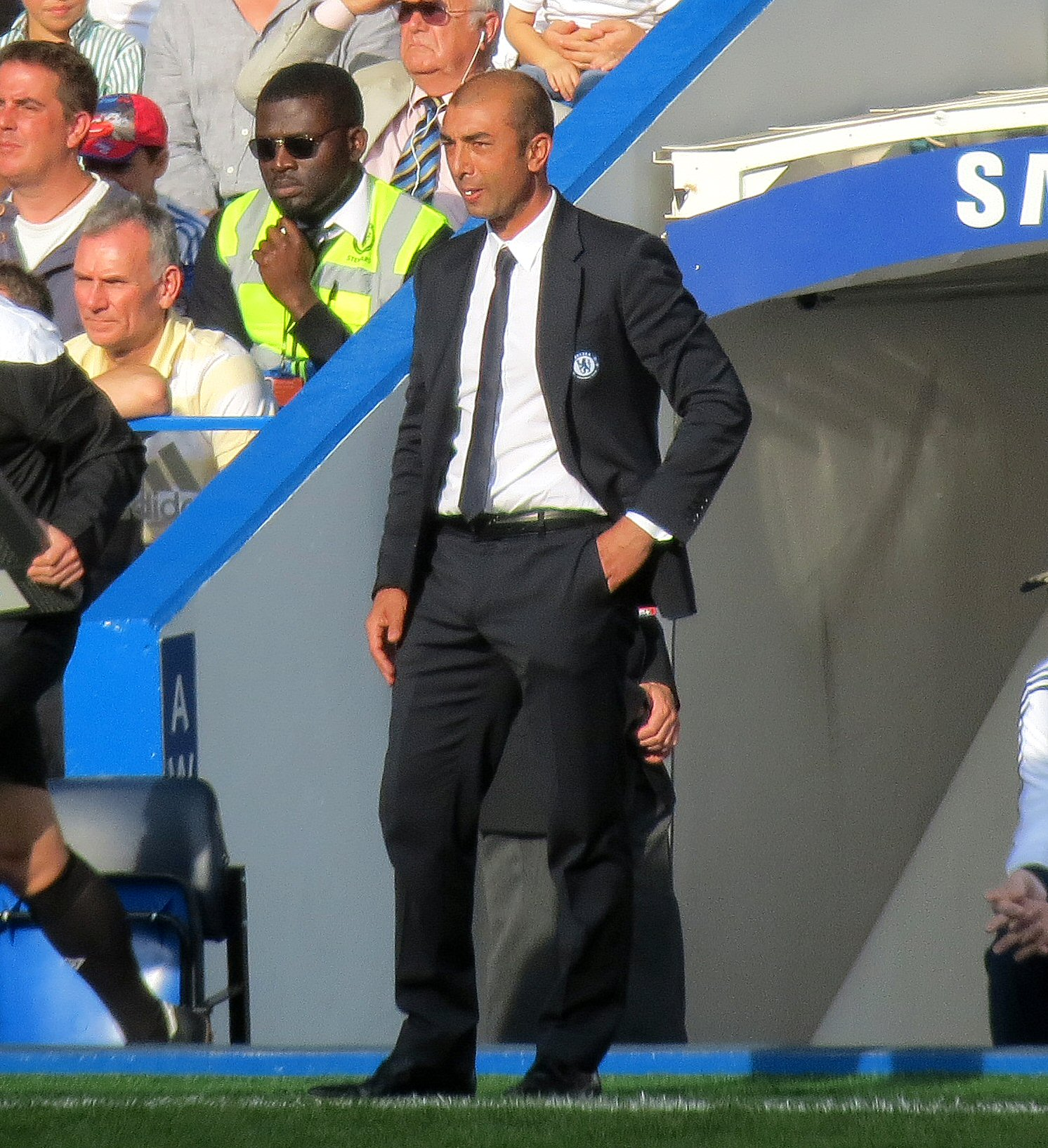
Roberto Di Matteo is the first manager to have won the UEFA Champions League for Chelsea.

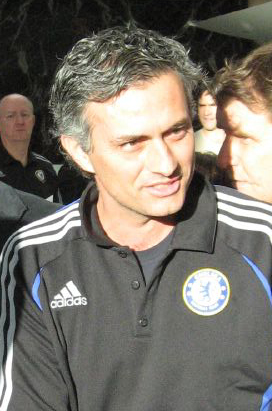
José Mourinho is one of the most successful managers in the club's history, with eight trophies won in two spells from 2004 to 2007 and from 2013 to 2015.

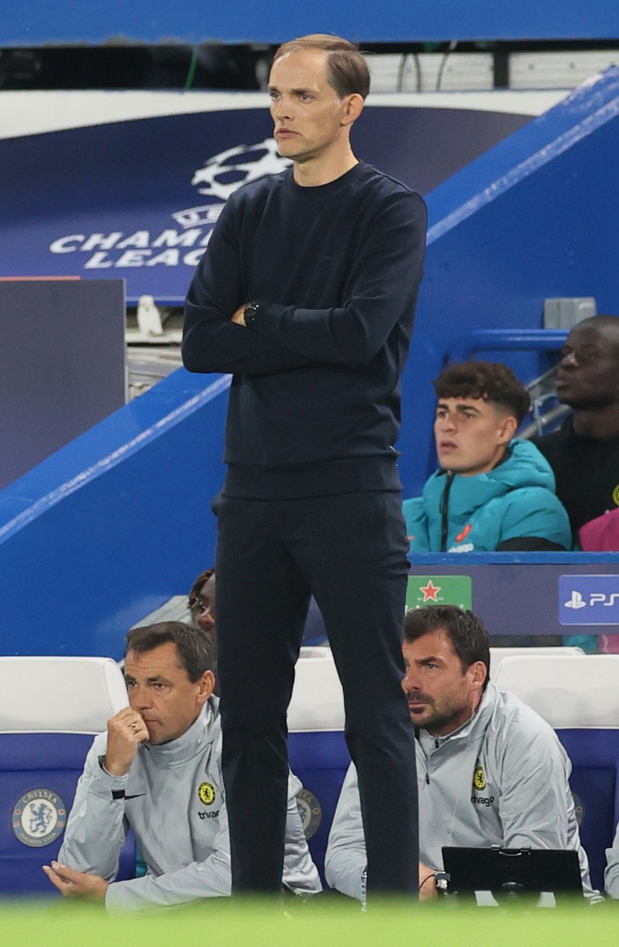
Thomas Tuchel led Chelsea to its first FIFA Club World Cup and is also the manager to have won the most international titles with the club.

Chelsea Football Club have had 34 permanent managers/head coaches (four of whom also served as player-manager), seven interim managers and seven caretakers. The first manager of the club was John Robertson, who was appointed player-manager in 1905. Ron Suart and Calum McFarlane have served as both caretaker and interim manager. José Mourinho has served two different spells as permanent manager, while Guus Hiddink has been interim manager twice. Roberto Di Matteo was initially appointed as interim manager, but was later given the job on a permanent basis, while Frank Lampard was a permanent manager, and later returned for a short spell as interim manager.

Chelsea's first ever manager was Scottish wing-half John Tait Robertson, who continued to play for the club until he resigned a year later. David Calderhead is Chelsea's longest-serving manager, holding the position from 1907 to 1933, spanning 966 matches. Chelsea's shortest reigning permanent manager is Liam Rosenior, who was in charge for 23 games. Statistically, Chelsea's least successful manager is Frank Lampard during his second stint.

The first manager under whom Chelsea won a major trophy was Ted Drake, who guided the club to the league championship in the 1954–55 season, while Dave Sexton managed the club to their first European honour, a UEFA Cup Winners' Cup triumph in 1971, and Gianluca Vialli guided Chelsea to win the 1998 UEFA Super Cup. Mourinho has won the most domestic titles, and total titles with the club (in fact, all titles won with Mourinho were domestic titles – eight in total); Vialli won the second most titles with five, whereas Carlo Ancelotti led Chelsea to their first league and FA Cup Double in 2010.

Di Matteo led Chelsea to their first UEFA Champions League title in 2012. A year later, Rafael Benítez led the club to the UEFA Europa League, and so Chelsea became the first club to hold two major European titles simultaneously and one of five clubs, and the first British club, to have won all three of UEFA's major club competitions. In February 2022, Thomas Tuchel led Chelsea to its first FIFA Club World Cup. He is also the coach to have won the most international titles with the club; all three of his titles were international.

In July 2025, Enzo Maresca guided Chelsea to victory in the 2025 FIFA Club World Cup, the first edition of the expanded competition, with a 3–0 win over the 2025 Champions League winners, Paris Saint-Germain, in the final.

== List of managers ==
Statistics correct as of 21 November 2026.

Key

- Includes competitive matches only.
- This table of all managers includes performance records and honours.
- M = matches managed; W = matches won; D = matches drawn; L = matches lost; GF = goals for; GA = goals against; GD = goal difference; Win% = percentage of total matches won.

Picture	Manager	Nationality	From	To	Days	M	W	D	L	GF	GA	GD	Win%	Honours	Notes	Ref.
	John Tait Robertson	Scotland	1 August 1905	27 November 1906	483	54	33	10	11	126	57	+69	61.11	–	(Note: Permanent manager.) (Note: Player-manager.)	
	William Lewis	England	27 November 1906	1 August 1907	247	27	17	5	5	54	25	+29	62.96	–	(Note: Interim manager.)	
	David Calderhead	Scotland	1 August 1907	8 May 1933	9,412	966	385	239	342	1,378	1,304	+74	39.86	–		
	Leslie Knighton	England	8 May 1933	19 April 1939	2,172	269	92	69	108	413	442	−29	34.20	–		
	Billy Birrell	Scotland	19 April 1939	31 May 1952	4,791	293	97	77	119	416	465	−49	33.11	–		
	Ted Drake	England	1 June 1952	30 September 1961	3,408	426	156	103	167	774	780	−6	36.62	1954–55 First Division; 1955 FA Charity Shield		
	Tommy Docherty	Scotland	1 October 1961	6 October 1967	2,196	303	142	65	96	527	424	+103	46.86	1965 Football League Cup		
	Ron Suart	England	6 October 1967	23 October 1967	17	2	0	1	1	1	8	−7	0.00	–	(Note: Caretaker manager.)	
	Dave Sexton	England	23 October 1967	3 October 1974	2,537	371	164	107	100	568	432	+136	44.20	1970 FA Cup; 1971 European Cup Winners' Cup		
	Ron Suart (2)	England	3 October 1974	16 April 1975	195	34	8	12	14	38	62	−24	23.53	–		
	Eddie McCreadie	Scotland	16 April 1975	1 July 1977	807	97	37	33	27	141	123	+18	38.14	–		
	Ken Shellito	England	7 July 1977	13 December 1978	524	66	15	19	32	77	115	−38	22.73	–		
	Danny Blanchflower	Northern Ireland	14 December 1978	11 September 1979	271	32	5	8	19	34	68	−34	15.63	–		
	Geoff Hurst	England	13 September 1979	23 April 1981	588	81	35	19	27	108	89	+19	43.21	–		
	Bobby Gould	England	23 April 1981	28 May 1981	35	2	0	0	2	0	5	−5	0.00	–		
	John Neal	England	28 May 1981	11 June 1985	1,475	203	84	61	58	326	253	+73	41.38	1983–84 Second Division	(Note: Win percentage includes one Football League Cup two-legged round won on penalties.)	
	John Hollins	England	11 June 1985	6 March 1988	999	145	56	38	51	199	217	−18	38.62	1986 Full Members' Cup	(Note: Win percentage includes one drawn Full Members' Cup match won on penalties.)	
	Bobby Campbell	England	6 March 1988	12 May 1991	1,162	165	77	47	41	287	233	+54	46.67	1988–89 Second Division; 1990 Full Members' Cup	(Note: Win percentage includes one drawn Full Members' Cup match lost on penalties.)	
	Ian Porterfield	Scotland	11 June 1991	15 February 1993	615	90	31	28	31	106	118	−12	34.44	–	(Note: Win percentage includes one drawn Full Members' Cup match won on penalties.)	
	David Webb	England	15 February 1993	11 May 1993	85	13	5	4	4	19	18	+1	38.46	–		
	Glenn Hoddle	England	4 June 1993	10 May 1996	1,071	157	53	54	50	192	183	+9	33.76	–	(Note: Win percentage includes: one drawn FA Cup match lost on penalties, and one drawn FA Cup match won on penalties.)	
	Ruud Gullit	Netherlands	10 May 1996	12 February 1998	643	83	41	18	24	158	109	+49	49.40	1997 FA Cup	(Note: Win percentage includes: one drawn FA Charity Shield match lost on penalties, and two drawn Football League Cup matches won on penalties.)	
	Gianluca Vialli	Italy	12 February 1998	12 September 2000	943	143	76	38	29	224	123	+101	53.15	1998 Football League Cup; 1998 UEFA Cup Winners' Cup; 1998 UEFA Super Cup; 2000 FA Cup; 2000 FA Charity Shield		
	Graham Rix	England	13 September 2000	17 September 2000	4	2	1	0	1	1	2	−1	50.00	–		
	Claudio Ranieri	Italy	18 September 2000	31 May 2004	1,351	199	107	46	46	358	197	+161	53.77	–		
	José Mourinho	Portugal	2 June 2004	20 September 2007	1,205	185	124	40	21	330	119	+211	67.03	2005 Football League Cup; 2004–05 Premier League; 2005 FA Community Shield; 2005–06 Premier League; 2007 Football League Cup; 2007 FA Cup	(Note: Win percentage includes: one drawn Football League Cup match lost on penalties, one UEFA Champions League two-legged round lost on penalties, and one drawn FA Community Shield match lost on penalties.)	
	Avram Grant	Israel	20 September 2007	24 May 2008	247	54	36	13	5	97	36	+61	66.67	–	(Note: Win percentage includes one drawn UEFA Champions League final lost on penalties.)	
	Luiz Felipe Scolari	Brazil	1 July 2008	9 February 2009	223	36	20	11	5	66	24	+42	55.56	–	(Note: Win percentage includes one drawn Football League Cup match lost on penalties.)	
	Ray Wilkins	England	9 February 2009	16 February 2009	7	1	1	0	0	3	1	+2	100.00	–		
	Guus Hiddink	Netherlands	16 February 2009	31 May 2009	104	22	16	5	1	41	19	+22	72.73	2009 FA Cup		
	Carlo Ancelotti	Italy	1 July 2009	22 May 2011	690	109	67	20	22	241	94	+147	61.47	2009 FA Community Shield; 2009–10 Premier League; 2010 FA Cup	(Note: Win percentage includes: one drawn FA Community Shield match won on penalties, one drawn Football League Cup match lost on penalties, and one drawn FA Cup match lost on penalties.)	
	André Villas-Boas	Portugal	22 June 2011	4 March 2012	256	40	19	11	10	69	43	+26	47.50	–	(Note: Win percentage includes one drawn Football League Cup match won on penalties.)	
	Roberto Di Matteo	Italy	4 March 2012	21 November 2012	262	42	24	9	9	91	56	+35	57.14	2012 FA Cup; 2012 UEFA Champions League	(Note: Win percentage includes one drawn UEFA Champions League final won on penalties.)	
	Rafael Benítez	Spain	21 November 2012	29 May 2013	189	48	28	10	10	99	49	+50	58.33	2013 UEFA Europa League		
	José Mourinho (2)	Portugal	3 June 2013	17 December 2015	927	136	80	29	27	245	121	+124	58.82	2015 Football League Cup; 2014–15 Premier League	(Note: Win percentage includes: one drawn UEFA Super Cup match lost on penalties, and one drawn Football League Cup match lost on penalties.)	
	Steve Holland	England	18 December 2015	20 December 2015	2	1	1	0	0	3	1	+2	100.00	–		
	Guus Hiddink (2)	Netherlands	20 December 2015	3 July 2016	196	27	10	11	6	52	34	+18	37.04	–		
	Antonio Conte	Italy	3 July 2016	13 July 2018	740	106	69	17	20	212	102	+110	65.09	2016–17 Premier League; 2018 FA Cup	(Note: Win percentage includes: one drawn FA Community Shield match lost on penalties, and one drawn FA Cup match won on penalties.)	
	Maurizio Sarri	Italy	14 July 2018	16 June 2019	337	63	39	13	11	112	58	+54	61.90	2019 UEFA Europa League	(Note: Win percentage includes: one EFL Cup two-legged round won on penalties, one drawn EFL Cup final lost on penalties, and one UEFA Europa League two-legged round won on penalties.)	
	Frank Lampard	England	4 July 2019	25 January 2021	571	84	44	17	23	163	106	+57	52.38	–	(Note: Win percentage includes: one drawn UEFA Super Cup match lost on penalties, and one drawn EFL Cup match lost on penalties.)	
	Thomas Tuchel	Germany	26 January 2021	7 September 2022	589	100	60	24	16	168	77	+91	60.00	2021 UEFA Champions League; 2021 UEFA Super Cup; 2021 FIFA Club World Cup	(Note: Win percentage includes: one drawn UEFA Super Cup match won on penalties, one drawn EFL Cup match won on penalties, one drawn EFL Cup final lost on penalties, and one drawn FA Cup final lost on penalties.)	
	Graham Potter	England	8 September 2022	2 April 2023	206	31	12	8	11	33	31	+2	38.71	–		
	Bruno Saltor	Spain	2 April 2023	6 April 2023	4	1	0	1	0	0	0	+0	0.00	–		
	Frank Lampard (2)	England	6 April 2023	30 June 2023	85	11	1	2	8	9	21	−12	9.09	–		
	Mauricio Pochettino	Argentina	1 July 2023	21 May 2024	325	51	26	11	14	103	74	+29	50.98	–	(Note: Win percentage includes one drawn EFL Cup match won on penalties.)	
	Enzo Maresca	Italy	1 July 2024	1 January 2026	549	92	55	16	21	191	98	+93	59.78	2025 UEFA Conference League; 2025 FIFA Club World Cup		
	Calum McFarlane	England	1 January 2026	8 January 2026	7	2	0	1	1	2	3	−1	0.00	–		
	Liam Rosenior	England	8 January 2026	22 April 2026	104	23	11	2	10	47	38	+9	47.83	–		
	Calum McFarlane (2)	England	22 April 2026	1 June 2026	40	6	2	1	3	6	8	−2	33.33	–		
	Xabi Alonso	Spain	1 July 2026	Present	143	14	7	2	5	29	24	+5	50.00	–		
Total			1 August 1905	Present	44,039	5,508	2,469	1,375	1,664	8,937	7,089	+1848	44.83	38 trophies	–	–
