= 1986 Full Members' Cup final =

- Event: 1985–86 Full Members' Cup
Chelsea	Manchester City
5	4
- Date: 23 March 1986
- Venue: Wembley Stadium, London
- Referee: Alan Saunders
- Attendance: 67,236

The 1986 Full Members' Cup final was a football match which took place at Wembley Stadium on 23 March 1986. It was the final of the inaugural Full Members' Cup, the competition created in the wake of the 1985 ban on English clubs from European competitions following the Heysel disaster. Contested between First Division sides Chelsea and Manchester City, the game produced nine goals, with Chelsea prevailing 5–4. Chelsea had led 5–1 courtesy of David Speedie's hat-trick and a brace by Colin Lee, but Manchester City scored three times in the last five minutes to give them a scare. Rougvie's own goal, the result of getting in front of City's Lillis, denied Lillis the consolation of having scored the fastest hat trick in Wembley history at that point. Both clubs had played First Division games the previous day; Chelsea a 1–0 victory over Southampton, Manchester City a 2–2 draw with local rivals Manchester United. Ten players from each side featured in both games over the weekend.

== Match details ==
23 March 1986
15:00 BST

Chelsea	5–4	Manchester City
Speedie 23', 51', 58'; Lee 36', 79'	Report	Kinsey 9'; Lillis 85', 89' (pen.); Rougvie 88' (o.g.)

Wembley Stadium, London
Attendance: 67,236
Referee: Alan Saunders (Newcastle)

Chelsea	Manchester City

CHELSEA:
GK	1	(England) Steve Francis
RB	2	(England) Darren Wood
LB	3	(Scotland) Doug Rougvie
CB	4	(England) Colin Pates (c)
CB	5	(Scotland) Joe McLaughlin
CM	6	(England) John Bumstead
RM	7	(Scotland) Pat Nevin
CM	8	(England) Nigel Spackman
CF	9	(England) Colin Lee
CF	10	(Scotland) David Speedie
LM	11	(Scotland) Kevin McAllister
Substitutes:
MF	12	(England) Micky Hazard
MF	13	(England) Keith Dublin
Manager:
(England) John Hollins

MANCHESTER CITY:
GK	1	(England) Eric Nixon
RB	2	(England) Nicky Reid	Substituted off
LB	3	(England) Paul Power (c)
CB	4	(England) Steve Redmond
CB	5	(Republic of Ireland) Mick McCarthy
RM	6	(Wales) David Phillips	Substituted off
CM	7	(England) Mark Lillis
CM	8	(England) Andy May
CF	9	(England) Steve Kinsey
CF	10	(Scotland) Neil McNab
LM	11	(England) Clive Wilson
Substitutes:
CF	12	(England) Paul Simpson	Substituted on
MF	13	(England) Graham Baker	Substituted on
Manager:
(Scotland) Billy McNeill

MATCH RULES

- 90 minutes.
- 30 minutes of extra-time if necessary.
- Penalty shootout if scores still level.
- Two named substitutes.
- Maximum of two substitutions.
