= 1985–86 Manchester City F.C. season =

English football club season

Manchester City
1985–86 season
- Manager: Billy McNeill
- Stadium: Maine Road
- First Division: 15th
- FA Cup: Third round
- Football League Cup: Third round
- Full Members' Cup: Runners-up
- Top goalscorer: League: Mark Lillis (11); All: Mark Lillis (15)
- Highest home attendance: 48,773 vs Manchester United; 17 September 1985
- Lowest home attendance: 9,799 vs Bury; 8 October 1985
- Average home league attendance: 24,229 (4th highest in league)
- Biggest win: 5–1 (13 Dec 1985 v Coventry City, PL Round 21)
- Biggest defeat: 4–0 (10 Feb 1986 at Everton, PL Round 38)

The 1985–86 season was Manchester City's 84th season of competitive football and 64th season in the top division of English football. In addition to the First Division, the club competed in the FA Cup, Football League Cup and Full Members' Cup.

== First Division ==
=== League table ===
Pos	Team	Pld	W	D	L	GF	GA	GD	Pts
13	Queens Park Rangers	42	15	7	20	53	64	−11	52
14	Southampton	42	12	10	20	51	62	−11	46
15	Manchester City	42	11	12	19	43	57	−14	45
16	Aston Villa	42	10	14	18	51	67	−16	44
17	Coventry City	42	11	10	21	48	71	−23	43

Source: World Football
Rules for classification: 1) Points; 2) Goal difference; 3) Goals scored

=== Results summary ===
Overall								Home						Away					
Pld	W	D	L	GF	GA	GD	Pts	W	D	L	GF	GA	GD	W	D	L	GF	GA	GD
42	11	12	19	43	57	−14	45	7	7	7	25	26	−1	4	5	12	18	31	−13

=== Results by matchday ===
Matchday	1	2	3	4	5	6	7	8	9	10	11	12	13	14	15	16	17	18	19	20	21	22	23	24	25	26	27	28	29	30	31	32	33	34	35	36	37	38	39	40	41	42
Ground	A	H	H	A	H	A	A	H	H	A	H	A	A	H	A	H	A	H	A	A	H	A	H	H	A	H	A	H	H	A	H	A	H	A	H	A	H	A	H	A	A	H
Result	D	D	L	W	W	L	L	L	D	L	L	L	D	D	L	D	W	W	L	D	W	L	W	D	W	W	W	W	W	L	L	L	L	D	D	L	L	D	L	L	L	D

A = Away; H = Home; W = Win; D = Draw; L = Loss

=== Matches ===
Date	Opponents	H / A	Venue	Result F–A	Scorers	Attendance
17 August 1985	Coventry City	A	Highfield Road	1–1	McIlroy	14,550
21 August 1985	Leicester City	H	Maine Road	1–1	Lillis (pen)	25,528
24 August 1985	Sheffield Wednesday	H	Maine Road	1–3	Simpson	26,934
26 August 1985	West Bromwich Albion	A	The Hawthorns	3–2	Lillis, Simpson, Wilson	12,122
31 August 1985	Tottenham Hotspur	H	Maine Road	2–1	Simpson, Miller (og)	27,789
3 September 1985	Birmingham City	A	St Andrews	0–1		11,706
7 September 1985	Southampton	A	The Dell	0–3		14,308
14 September 1985	Manchester United	H	Maine Road	0–3		48,733
21 September 1985	West Ham United	H	Maine Road	2–2	Lillis, Melrose	22,001
28 September 1985	Oxford United	A	Abbey Stadium	0–1		9,796
5 October 1985	Chelsea	H	Maine Road	0–1		20,104
12 October 1985	Watford	A	Vicarage Road	2–3	Lillis, McNab	15,418
19 October 1985	Queens Park Rangers	A	Loftus Road	0–0		13,471
26 October 1985	Everton	H	Maine Road	1–1	Simpson	28,801
2 November 1985	Arsenal	A	Highbury	0–1		22,264
9 November 1985	Ipswich Town	H	Maine Road	1–1	Lillis (pen)	20,853
16 November 1985	Nottingham Forest	A	City Ground	2–0		15,140
23 November 1985	Newcastle United	H	Maine Road	1–0	Lillis	25,179
30 November 1985	Luton Town	A	Kenilworth Road	1–2	Lillis (pen)	10,096
7 December 1985	Leicester City	A	Filbert Street	1–1	Davies	10,289
14 December 1985	Coventry City	H	Maine Road	5–1	Davies (2), Lillis, Simpson (2)	20,075
21 December 1985	Sheffield Wednesday	A	Hillsborough Stadium	2–3	Lillis, McNab	23,177
26 December 1985	Liverpool	H	Maine Road	1–0	Wilson	35,384
28 December 1985	Birmingham City	H	Maine Road	1–1	McNab	24,955
1 January 1986	Aston Villa	A	Villa Park	1–0	Lillis	14,215
11 January 1986	Southampton	H	Maine Road	1–0	Philips	21,674
18 January 1986	Tottenham Hotspur	A	White Hart Lane	2–0	Davies, Lillis	17,009
1 February 1986	West Bromwich Albion	H	Maine Road	2–1	Power, Davies	20,540
8 February 1986	Queens Park Rangers	H	Maine Road	2–0	Simpson, Davies	20,414
11 February 1986	Everton	A	Goodison Park	0–4		30,006
1 March 1986	Oxford United	H	Maine Road	0–3		20,009
8 March 1986	Chelsea	A	Stamford Bridge	0–1		17,573
15 March 1986	Watford	H	Maine Road	0–1		18,899
22 March 1986	Manchester United	A	Old Trafford	2–2	Wilson, Albiston (og)	51,274
29 March 1986	Aston Villa	H	Maine Road	0–0	McNab, Wilson	20,935
31 March 1986	Liverpool	A	Anfield	0–2		43,316
5 April 1986	Arsenal	A	Maine Road	0–1		19,590
12 April 1986	Ipswich Town	A	Portman Road	0–0		13,928
19 April 1986	Nottingham Forest	A	City Ground	1–3	Davies	19,715
26 April 1986	Newcastle United	A	St James Park	1–3	Davies	22,689
28 April 1986	West Ham United	A	Boleyn Ground	0–1	Stewart (pen)	21,753
3 May 1986	Luton Town	H	Maine Road	1–1	Davies	20,361

== FA Cup ==
3 January 1986 Third round	Walsall	1–3	Manchester City	Walsall
				Stadium: Fellows Park

24 January 1986 Fourth round	Manchester City	1–1	Watford	Manchester
				Stadium: Maine Road

2 February 1986 Fourth round	Watford	0–0 aet	Manchester City	Watford
				Stadium: Vicarage Road

5 February 1986 Fourth round	Manchester City	1–3	Watford	Manchester
				Stadium: Maine Road

== EFL Cup ==
24 September 1985 Second round	Bury	1–2	Manchester City	Bury
				Stadium: Gigg Lane

9 October 1985 Second round	Manchester City	2–1	Bury	Manchester
				Stadium: Maine Road

29 October 1985 Third round	Manchester City	1–2	Arsenal	Manchester
				Stadium: Maine Road

== Full Members' Cup ==
14 October 1985 First round, Northern section	Manchester City	6–1	Leeds United	Manchester
				Stadium: Maine Road

22 October 1985 First round, Northern section	Sheffield United	1–2	Manchester City	Sheffield
				Stadium: Bramall Lane

4 November 1985 Semi finals, Northern section	Manchester City	0–0 (pen)	Sunderland	Manchester
				Stadium: Maine Road

26 November 1985 Final, Northern section 1st Leg	Hull City	2–1	Manchester City	Hull
				Stadium: Boothferry Park

11 December 1985 Final, Northern section 2nd Leg	Manchester City	2–0	Hull City	Manchester
				Stadium: Maine Road

23 March 1986 Final	Chelsea	5–4	Manchester City	Manchester
				Stadium: Maine Road
