= Darren Wood =

English footballer

Personal information
- Date of birth: 9 June 1964 (age 62)
- Place of birth: Scarborough, England
- Height: 5 ft 10 in (1.78 m)
- Position: Full back

Youth career
- Middlesbrough

Senior career*
Years	Team	Apps	(Gls)
1981–1984	Middlesbrough	101	(6)
1984–1989	Chelsea	144	(3)
1989–1990	Sheffield Wednesday	11	(0)
- * Club domestic league appearances and goals

Darren Wood (born 9 June 1964) is an English former footballer, who played as a full back in the Football League between 1981 and 1990 for Middlesbrough, Chelsea and Sheffield Wednesday.

Born in Scarborough, Wood began his career with Middlesbrough, making 101 league appearances between 1981 and 1984. He became the focal point of a dispute which ended Malcolm Allison's managerial reign at Middlesbrough: with the club on the verge of liquidation, Allison threatened to resign if Wood were sold to Chelsea for £100,000, declaring that it was "better for the club to die than to linger on". Chairman Mike McCullagh accused Allison of no longer being reliable in trying to save the club and promptly sacked him, installing Jack Charlton as caretaker manager. In September 1984, Wood joined Chelsea for a fee reported as "around £50,000" and the return of former Middlesbrough captain Tony McAndrew to Ayresome Park. The Evening Gazette reported that Liverpool had offered £250,000 for Wood just six months earlier.

Wood eventually played in 178 matches in all competitions for the west London club. Being switched to midfield, where he was unpopular when keeping the stylish Micky Hazard out of the team. He was sold to Sheffield Wednesday in 1989, but made only a handful of appearances before retiring due to a back injury endured over a 2-year period.

Wood captained England Schoolboys at the age of 15. He followed in his father's footsteps who also captained England Schoolboys and they are the only father and son to have achieved this. After retiring as a player he went into the food retail business owning 12 delicatessens across Yorkshire. He settled in his wife's hometown of Leeds, in the village of Thorner, with their 2 children.

== Honours ==
Chelsea

- Football League Second Division: 1988–89
- Full Members' Cup: 1985–86
