= Carlo Ancelotti =

Italian football manager (born 1959)

Carlo Ancelotti Cavaliere OMRI, Ufficiale OSI
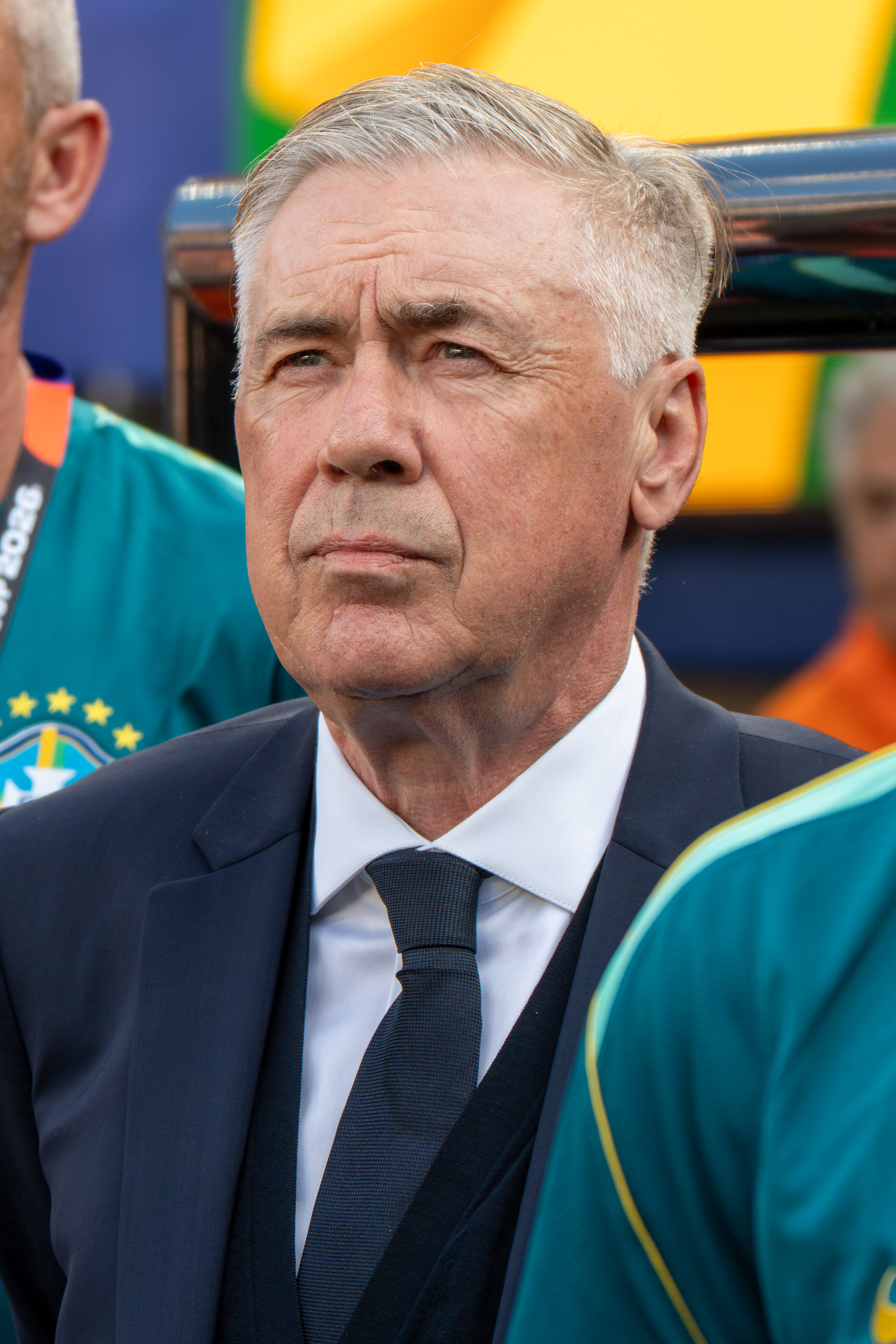
- Ancelotti with Brazil in 2026

Personal information
- Full name: Carlo Ancelotti
- Date of birth: 10 June 1959 (age 67)
- Place of birth: Reggiolo, Emilia-Romagna, Italy
- Height: 1.79 m (5 ft 10 in)
- Position: Midfielder

Team information
- Current team: Brazil (head coach)

Youth career
- 1973–1976: Reggiolo
- 1975–1976: Parma

Senior career*
Years	Team	Apps	(Gls)
1976–1979	Parma	55	(13)
1979–1987	Roma	171	(12)
1987–1992	AC Milan	112	(10)
Total		338	(35)

International career
1980	Italy U-21	3	(0)
1979–1989	Italy Olympic	11	(1)
1981–1991	Italy	26	(1)

Managerial career
- 1992–1995: Italy (assistant)
- 1995–1996: Reggiana
- 1996–1998: Parma
- 1999–2001: Juventus
- 2001–2009: AC Milan
- 2009–2011: Chelsea
- 2011–2013: Paris Saint-Germain
- 2013–2015: Real Madrid
- 2016–2017: Bayern Munich
- 2018–2019: Napoli
- 2019–2021: Everton
- 2021–2025: Real Madrid
- 2025–: Brazil
Medal record
Men's football (as player)
Representing Italy
FIFA World Cup
Third place	1990 Italy
Representing Italy (as assistant manager)
FIFA World Cup
Runner-up	1994
- * Club domestic league appearances and goals

Carlo Ancelotti (Italian pronunciation: [ˈkarlo antʃeˈlɔtti]; born 10 June 1959) is an Italian professional football manager and former player who is the head coach of the Brazil national team. Nicknamed Carletto in Italy and Don Carlo in Spain, he is regarded as one of the greatest football managers of all time.

Ancelotti has won the UEFA Champions League five times, a record for a manager, and is the only manager to take part in six Champions League finals. Ancelotti is also the only manager to win league titles in all of Europe's top five leagues. He has won the FIFA Club World Cup three times and has won the UEFA Super Cup five times, a record for a manager.

As a player, Ancelotti won two European Cups with AC Milan in 1989 and 1990, making him one of seven people to have won the European Cup/Champions League as both a player and a manager. He played as a midfielder and began his career with Italian club Parma, helping the club get promoted to Serie B in the 1978–79 season. He moved to Roma the following season, where he won a Serie A title and four Coppa Italia titles. He then played for the late 1980s Milan team and won multiple titles, including two Scudetti and two European Cups. At international level, he had 26 appearances and one goal for the Italy national team. He represented Italy at two FIFA World Cups and at the UEFA Euro 1988, finishing in third place at the 1990 World Cup and being a semi-finalist at the Euro tournament.

As a manager, Ancelotti worked for Reggiana, Parma, and Juventus between 1995 and 2001. He then joined Milan in 2001 and went on to win both the 2002–03 Champions League and 2002–03 Coppa Italia. The following season, he won the Scudetto with an Italian record of 82 points. In 2007, he won his second Champions League with Milan. Ancelotti was awarded the Serie A Coach of the Year twice. He resigned from Milan after the 2008–09 season and was the club's longest-serving manager.

In 2009, Ancelotti became the manager of Chelsea and won the domestic double of the Premier League and the FA Cup in his first season. In 2011, he became the manager of Paris Saint-Germain; the following season, he won their first Ligue 1 title in 19 years and was awarded joint Ligue 1 Manager of the Year. Following his success in France, Ancelotti became the manager of Real Madrid. In his first season, he led Real Madrid to their tenth Champions League title and a Copa del Rey title. Despite winning more trophies with the club and being awarded the Miguel Muñoz Trophy in 2014–15 for the best manager in La Liga, Ancelotti was dismissed from Real Madrid in May 2015. He became the manager of Bayern Munich in 2016 and won the Bundesliga title in his first season. Following stints at Napoli and Everton between 2018 and 2021, he returned to Real Madrid in the summer of 2021, where he won two La Liga–Champions League doubles in 2022 and 2024. In 2025, he was appointed as coach of a national team for the first time when he took on the position with Brazil.

== Club career ==
=== Parma ===
Ancelotti began his career in 1974 with Parma. He made his professional debut in Serie C during the 1976–77 season, at the age of 18. Under manager Cesare Maldini, he was often deployed as an attacking midfielder or as a second striker, due to his eye for goal. Ancelotti excelled in these roles and helped Parma to a second place in the Serie C1 girone A during the 1978–79 season, which qualified the team for the Serie B play-offs. In the decisive match in Vicenza, against Triestina, with the score tied at 1–1, he scored two goals, which gave Parma a 3–1 victory and sealed their place in Serie B the following season.

=== Roma ===
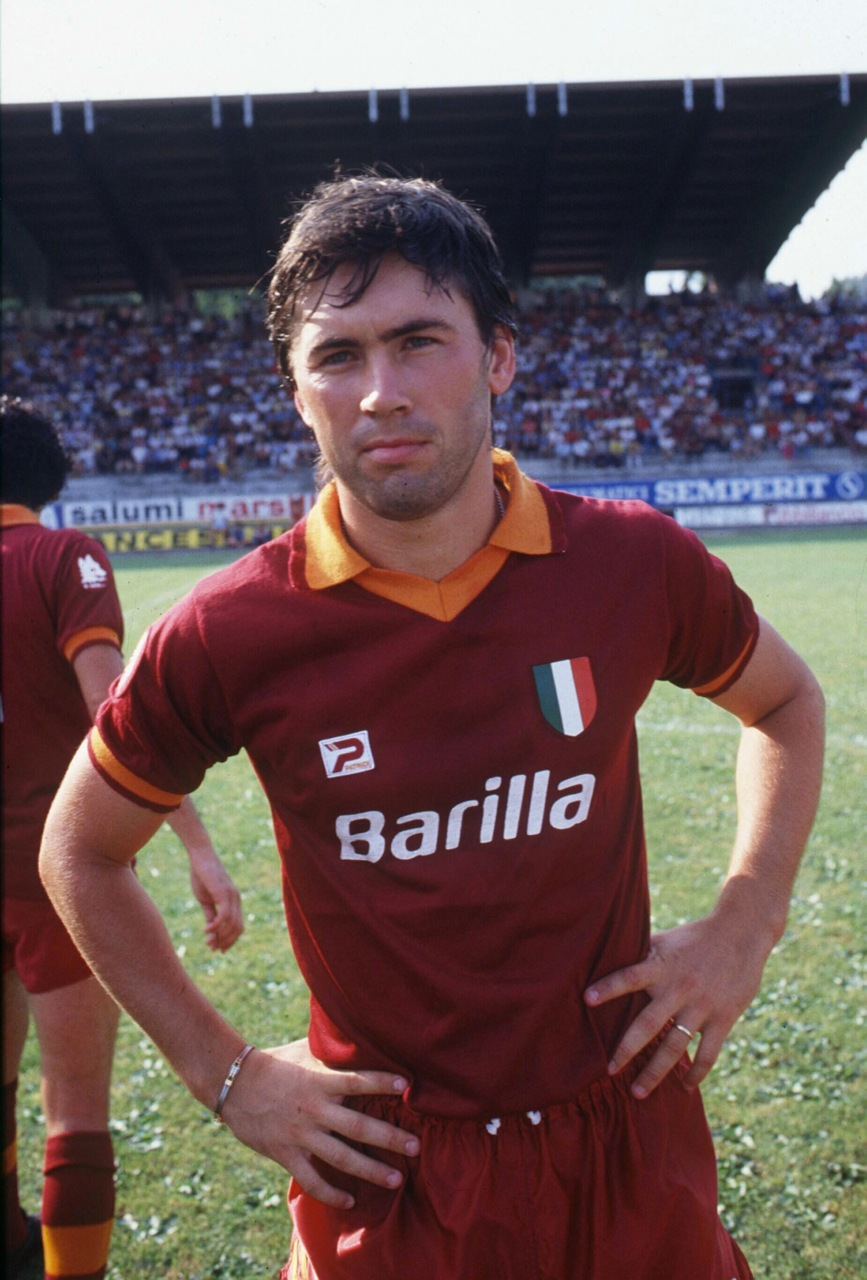
Ancelotti playing for Roma during the 1983–84 season

After attracting strong interest from Inter Milan, in mid-1979 Ancelotti transferred to Roma, and made his Serie A debut in a 0–0 draw against AC Milan on 16 September. Under manager Nils Liedholm, he was deployed as a winger or central midfielder and became one of the club's most important players, in a team which featured Brazilian midfielders Falcão and Toninho Cerezo, as well as Italian footballers Roberto Pruzzo, Bruno Conti, Agostino Di Bartolomei and Pietro Vierchowod, winning consecutive Coppa Italia titles in his first two seasons with the club. During his eight seasons in Rome, he won the Coppa Italia a total of four times (1980, 1981, 1984 and 1986). After struggling with knee injuries, and managing second and third-place league finishes in 1981 and 1982, Ancelotti helped lead the team to win the Italian championship in 1983, the club's second league title in their history.

In the following season, Ancelotti helped Roma to win another Coppa Italia title and reach the European Cup final in 1984, although he missed the final through injury, as Roma were defeated by Liverpool on penalties at the Stadio Olimpico in Rome. He was named the team's captain in 1985 under new club manager Sven-Göran Eriksson, and served as a mentor to the young midfielder Giuseppe Giannini, as Roma won the Coppa Italia, but once again narrowly missed out on the league title during the 1985–86 Serie A season, finishing in second place behind Juventus.

=== AC Milan ===
From 1987 until 1992, Ancelotti played for Milan, and was a key part of the squad that won the Serie A title in 1988, consecutive European Cups in 1989 and 1990, two European Super Cups, two Intercontinental Cups and a Supercoppa Italiana under manager Arrigo Sacchi. During this time, Milan, under the financial backing of club president Silvio Berlusconi, featured players such as Paolo Maldini, Franco Baresi, Mauro Tassotti and Alessandro Costacurta as defenders; Frank Rijkaard, Ruud Gullit and Roberto Donadoni as midfielders; and Marco van Basten upfront. One of Ancelotti's most memorable moments with Milan was when he received a pass from Ruud Gullit, dribbled around two Real Madrid players and scored a powerful long-range shot during the Rossoneri's 5–0 thrashing of Real Madrid in the 1989 European Cup semi-finals. He went on to play all 90 minutes in Milan's 4–0 win over Steaua București in the final.

The following season, Ancelotti suffered an injury to his left knee in the quarter-finals of the European Cup against KV Mechelen, which forced him to miss the semi-finals, although he was able to return in time to help Milan defend their title against Benfica in the final, held in Vienna. Following Sacchi's departure, he won a second Serie A title under his replacement Fabio Capello during the 1991–92 Serie A season, as Milan won the title undefeated, but persistent knee injuries and competition from youngster Demetrio Albertini limited his playing time, and eventually forced him into premature retirement at the end of the season, at the age of 33. He played the final match of his career with the club in a 4–0 home win over Hellas Verona on 17 May 1992, in which he came off the bench in the final 20 minutes of the game and scored two goals, and was given an ovation by the fans.

== International career ==
Under manager Enzo Bearzot, Ancelotti made his Italy national team debut and scored his first and only goal on 6 January 1981 in the 1980 World Champions' Gold Cup against the Netherlands, which ended in a 1–1 draw. He was very likely to be capped for the 1982 World Cup campaign, but a dramatic knee injury forced him away for several months, as Italy went on to win the tournament without him. He was a part of Italy's squad in the 1986 World Cup, but did not make a single appearance, as both he and Paolo Rossi struggled during the team's fitness tests, due to the altitude of the region, and were replaced in the starting line-up by Fernando De Napoli and Giuseppe Galderisi, respectively.

Under new Italy manager Azeglio Vicini, he was a key member of the Italy squad that reached the semi-finals of UEFA Euro 1988, and was also set to represent his nation at the Summer Olympics in Seoul that summer. An injury to the meniscus of his right knee, however, prevented him from taking part in the tournament, where Italy ultimately managed a fourth-place finish. Ancelotti later went on to play in the 1990 World Cup on home soil under Vicini at the age of 31, although another injury in the first group match against Austria once again limited his appearances in the competition to just three, and kept him on the sidelines until the third-place final against England, in which he returned to help Italy to a 2–1 win. Ancelotti made a total of 26 performances for the Italy national side, and announced his retirement from international football in 1991, making his final Italy appearance under Arrigo Sacchi.

== Style of play ==
Ancelotti was a midfielder known for his leadership and creativity; he was regarded as one of the best Italian midfielders of his generation. Although he lacked pace and physicality, he was a talented, hardworking, and tenacious player who had excellent technical ability, tactical intelligence, vision, and passing range; his most notable skill being his powerful and accurate shooting from outside the box. A versatile midfielder, he was capable playing several midfield positions. He often played as a deep-lying playmaker, as a central midfielder, or as a defensive midfielder, which allowed him to set the tempo of play after winning back the ball; he was also the mentor and predecessor of Demetrio Albertini and Andrea Pirlo when he was a playmaker at Milan. Despite his abilities, his playing time was cut short by several injuries, which forced him into retirement in 1992 at the age of 33.

== Managerial career ==
=== Reggiana ===
Ancelotti undertook his coaching studies at Coverciano, where he penned a research article entitled "Il Futuro del Calcio: Più Dinamicità" (English: "The Future of Football: More Dynamism"). After serving as an assistant manager with the Italy national team under his former Milan coach Arrigo Sacchi between 1992 and 1995, and reaching the 1994 World Cup final, Ancelotti began his managerial career with Serie B side Reggiana in 1995–96 season, where he immediately aided the team in achieving promotion to Serie A; he left after the 1995–96 Serie B season, finishing with a record of 17 wins, fourteen draws and ten losses in his only season with the club.

=== Parma ===
Ancelotti joined Parma the following season, a team which had recently enjoyed several years of domestic and European success under the previous manager Nevio Scala, and which contained several promising young players, including future Italy stars Gianluigi Buffon and Fabio Cannavaro. Ancelotti made his debut in the Coppa Italia in a 3–1 loss to Pescara. Ancelotti made several changes at the club, implementing a rigorous Sacchi-inspired 4–4–2 formation, and initially deploying creative forward Gianfranco Zola out of position on the left wing in order to accommodate Hristo Stoichkov up-front, although both players were later eventually sold by the club after lack of playing time, due to struggling to perform in this system. With the new attacking partnership of Enrico Chiesa and Hernán Crespo, Parma finished second in Serie A during the 1996–97 season under Ancelotti, which guaranteed them a place in the next edition of the UEFA Champions League.

The following season, the club had agreed to sign another Italian creative forward, Roberto Baggio, but Ancelotti impeded the transfer as he once again did not feel that a player like Baggio would fit into his tactical plans. Ancelotti later stated that he regretted this decision, stating that at the time he believed that the 4–4–2 was the ideal formation for success, and that offensive playmakers were not compatible with this system. After suffering a first round elimination in the 1997–98 Champions League, and a semi–final appearance in the Coppa Italia, Ancelotti was only able to guide Parma to a sixth-place finish in Serie A during the 1997–98 season, and was dismissed at the end of the season, despite qualifying the team for next season's UEFA Cup.

=== Juventus ===
In February 1999, Ancelotti was appointed manager of Juventus, where he both succeeded and preceded Marcello Lippi, who returned to the club when Ancelotti left. With Juventus, Ancelotti became less rigorous with the team's formation, abandoning his favoured 4–4–2 in order to accommodate French playmaker Zinedine Zidane in his preferred free role behind the forwards in the team's starting line-up. Juventus reached the semi-finals of the Champions League during the 1998–99 season, losing out to eventual champions Manchester United, but finished in seventh place in Serie A, failing to qualify for the Champions League the following season and also losing out to Udinese on aggregate in the UEFA Cup play-offs, meaning they qualified for the Intertoto Cup.

Ancelotti's first full season at Juventus began promisingly, as he immediately won the Intertoto Cup with the club by beating Rennes 4–2 on aggregate, although Juventus suffered a round of 16 elimination in the UEFA Cup, and lost the league title to Lazio by a single point on the final match-day of the season; this was after surrendering a five-point lead with three games remaining, which drew strong criticism from the board of directors.

The following season, Ancelotti went trophyless, suffering a first-round elimination in the Champions League, and finishing runner-up in Serie A yet again, to Roma, and he was dismissed by Juventus. Ancelotti's dismissal was announced by Juventus at half-time in the final league game of the season at home against Atalanta, on 17 June 2001, even though they were still within a chance of winning the title; Juventus won the match 2–1, although the result was not enough to prevent them from finishing behind Roma in the league. Ancelotti finished his tenure with Juventus with a record of 63 wins, 33 draws and 18 losses.

=== AC Milan ===
Ancelotti was appointed Milan manager on 5 November 2001, after Fatih Terim was dismissed due to poor results. He was inheriting another recently trophyless team in Milan, as the Rossoneri had floundered domestically and in Europe since their last Scudetto victory in 1999. In the 2001–02 season, Ancelotti led Milan to qualify for the Champions League once again, as the team managed a fourth-place finish in Serie A, and also reached semi-finals of the UEFA Cup, their best ever finish in the competition, losing out to Borussia Dortmund, and also suffered a semi-final elimination in the Coppa Italia to Juventus.

The following season, Ancelotti – who was heavily criticised by club owner Silvio Berlusconi due to his supposedly defensive tactics – was able to adopt a creative play in Milan while making several changes to the team's squad. He made Dida, still maligned for his 2000–01 Champions League howler against Leeds United, his new starting goalkeeper barely a month into the season, while converting budding attacking midfielder Andrea Pirlo to a defensive midfielder, playing him behind the number 10 (either Rui Costa or Rivaldo) in front of the team's back-line as a deep-lying playmaker in a 4–3–1–2 or 4–1–2–1–2 formation. At the same time, Filippo Inzaghi and Andriy Shevchenko proved to be dominant and dynamic strikers, who were prolific in front of goal.

Milan won the 2003 Champions League final, beating Juventus 3–2 on penalties at Old Trafford, and also won the 2003 Coppa Italia Final over Roma. The following season, with the addition of Brazilian attacking midfielder Kaká, and Ancelotti's formidable four-man back-line of Cafu, Costacurta, Alessandro Nesta and Maldini, Milan took home the UEFA Super Cup in 2003 over Porto, followed by the Scudetto in 2004 with an Italian record of 82 points from 34 games, while Shevchenko finished the season as the league's top-scorer. The Rossoneri, however, suffered penalty-shootout defeats to Juventus in the 2003 Supercoppa Italiana, and to Boca Juniors in the 2003 Intercontinental Cup. They were also knocked out by Deportivo de La Coruña in the 2003–04 UEFA Champions League.

Under Ancelotti's reign, Milan won the 2004 Supercoppa Italiana, and were also back-to-back Serie A runners-up to Juventus in 2004–05 and 2005–06 (both scudetti were later wiped from the record books of Juventus due to the club's involvement in the Calciopoli scandal). During the 2004–05 season, Ancelotti also led Milan to the 2005 Champions League final, where they lost out to Liverpool 2–3 on penalties after a 3–3 draw in normal time. In the Coppa Italia, the team was unable to get past the quarter finals. The following season, Milan once again faced disappointment as they lost out to Barcelona in the Champions League semi-finals, and only reached the quarterfinals of the Coppa Italia.

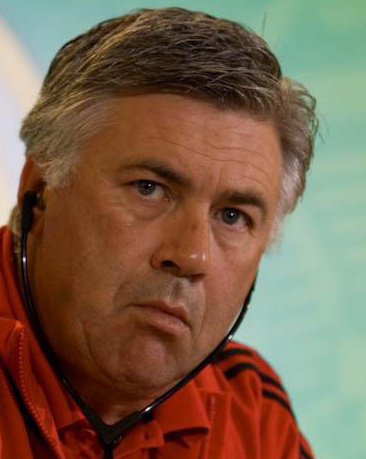
Ancelotti with AC Milan in 2007

After the departure of striker Andriy Shevchenko at the beginning of the 2006–07 season, Ancelotti was forced to redesign Milan's line-up once again, devising a 4–3–2–1 system that would later be known as his "Christmas Tree" formation. Milan's line-up used Inzaghi as a lone striker, supported by attacking midfielders Clarence Seedorf and Kaká, in front of a three-man midfield which featured Andrea Pirlo as a creative playmaker, supported by hard-working defensive midfielders Gennaro Gattuso and Massimo Ambrosini.

Milan received an eight-point deduction during the 2006–07 Serie A season for their role in the Calciopoli scandal, which virtually put the team out of the title race, and instead led Ancelotti to focus on winning the Champions League. On 23 May 2007, Milan avenged their defeat to Liverpool two years earlier with a 2–1 win at the Olympic Stadium in Athens in the 2007 Champions League final, leading to Ancelotti's second Champions League trophy as Milan coach and his fourth title overall, having also won it twice as a Milan player in 1989 and 1990. During the 2006–07 season, Milan also finished fourth in Serie A, and lost out to eventual champions Roma in the Coppa Italia semi-final. The next season, Ancelotti also won the 2007 UEFA Super Cup, as well as the club's first ever FIFA Club World Cup in 2007, becoming the first manager to do so with a European side. After finishing the league in fifth place, Milan missed out on Champions League qualification, and also suffered round of 16 eliminations in the Champions League and Coppa Italia (to Arsenal and Catania respectively).

In Ancelotti's final season at the club, Milan managed a third-place finish in Serie A behind Juventus and cross-city rivals Inter, sealing a place in the next season's Champions League, while they were eliminated in the round of 32 of the UEFA Cup, and the round of 16 of the Coppa Italia. After previously denying rumours that he would be leaving the club, on 31 May 2009 Ancelotti announced his resignation from Milan – less than an hour after their 2–0 victory over Fiorentina in the final match of the season. In total, Ancelotti led Milan for 423 games; only Nereo Rocco has been in charge of the club for more matches.

=== Chelsea ===
On 1 June 2009, Ancelotti succeeded interim manager Guus Hiddink when he was confirmed as the new Chelsea manager after agreeing to a three-year contract, and formally assumed his duties on July 1st. Ancelotti became the club's fourth permanent manager in 21 months, following José Mourinho, Avram Grant and Luiz Felipe Scolari. He was also the third Italian to manage Chelsea, after Gianluca Vialli and Claudio Ranieri.

On 9 August 2009, Ancelotti won his first trophy as Chelsea manager, the Community Shield, beating Manchester United on penalties, following a 2–2 draw. His first Premier League game in charge of the Blues ended in a 2–1 home victory over Hull City on 15 August. Chelsea lost their first match under Ancelotti at the DW Stadium away to Wigan Athletic on 26 September, losing 1–3. They were eliminated from the League Cup on 2 December, reaching the quarter-finals stage, after a penalty shootout defeat to Blackburn Rovers after a 3–3 draw at Ewood Park.

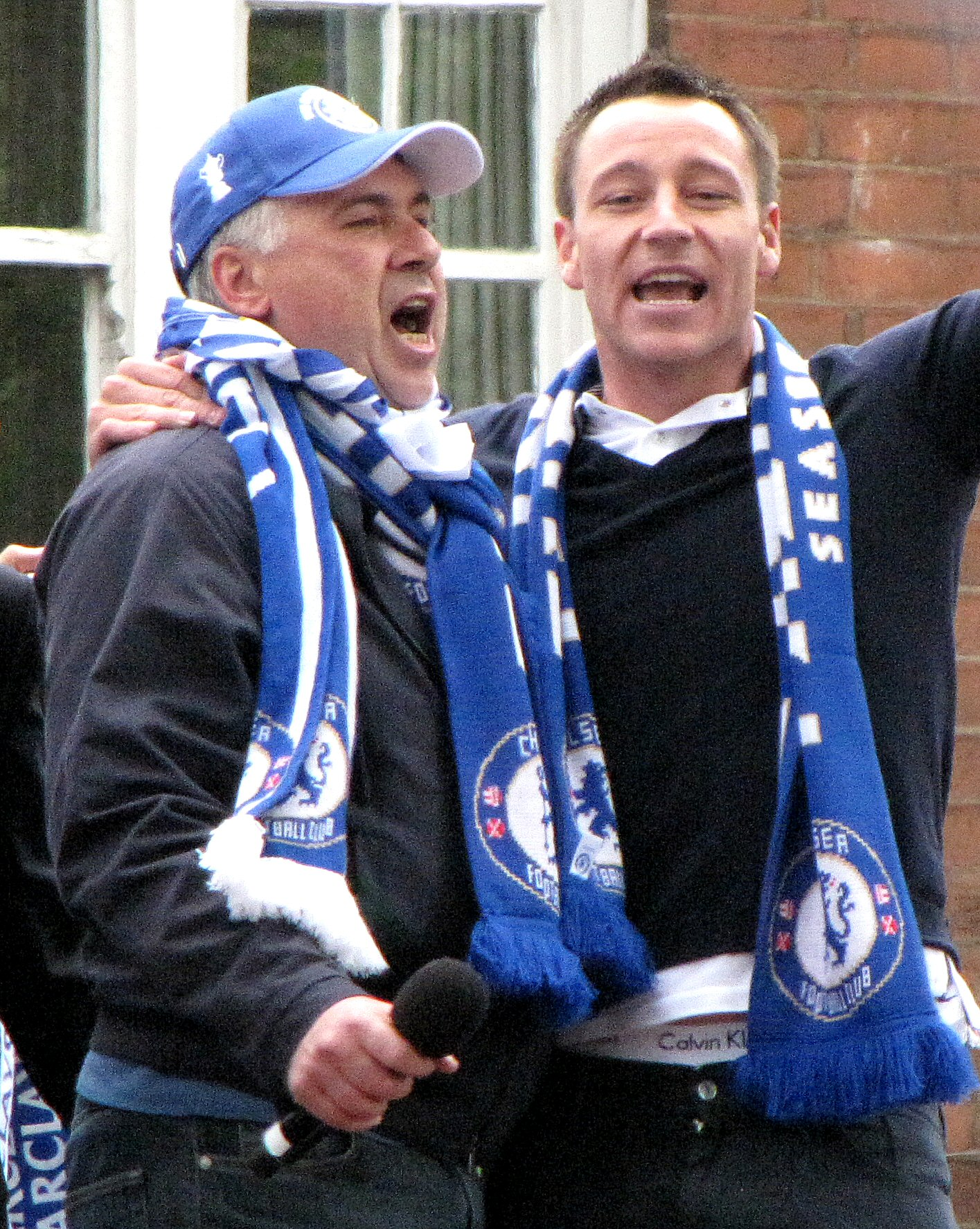
Ancelotti celebrates Chelsea's first League and Cup double with team captain John Terry in 2010

In the Champions League, Ancelotti returned to the San Siro for the first time since his departure from Milan, when his team faced Inter Milan, who was at the time coached by ex-Chelsea manager José Mourinho, at the Round of 16 stage. Ancelotti and Mourinho had a tense relationship from the previous season, as managers of Milan and Inter respectively. Chelsea were eliminated from the Champions League on 16 March 2010 after a 1–3 aggregate loss to Inter, having lost 1–2 away and 0–1 at Stamford Bridge.

On 9 May 2010, Ancelotti led Chelsea to the Premier League title, beating Manchester United by one point and setting scoring records. The team finished the campaign with 103 goals, becoming the first team in the Premier League to score more than 100 goals in a season, and the first in the English top flight since Tottenham Hotspur in the 1962–63 season. Chelsea secured the title with an 8–0 victory over Wigan at Stamford Bridge. Ancelotti also became the first Italian manager to win the Premier League and only the fifth manager overall in the League's 18 seasons. On 15 May 2010, Ancelotti led Chelsea to its first ever domestic double by defeating Portsmouth 1–0 in the FA Cup final at Wembley; this was Chelsea's third FA Cup in four years, equalling the record set by Arsenal between 2002 and 2005.

The following season, after having lost to Manchester United in the 2010 FA Community Shield in August, Ancelotti led Chelsea to the top of the table on the first weekend of the season thanks to a 6–0 rout of newly promoted West Bromwich Albion. Chelsea followed up this result with another 6–0 win, this time over Wigan, while Stoke City were beaten 2–0 in the next match. Chelsea had a good start to the season, winning their first five matches. Chelsea then lost 3–4 against Newcastle United on 23 September 2010 in the League Cup. They then went on to lose against Manchester City in the Premier League 0–1 after a cleverly taken strike by City captain Carlos Tevez. Chelsea made a good start in Europe by beating MŠK Žilina and Marseille 4–1 and 2–0, respectively, in the 2010–11 UEFA Champions League. Chelsea then defeated fourth-placed Arsenal 2–0 on 3 October 2010, courtesy of a goal from Didier Drogba and a free-kick by defender Alex.

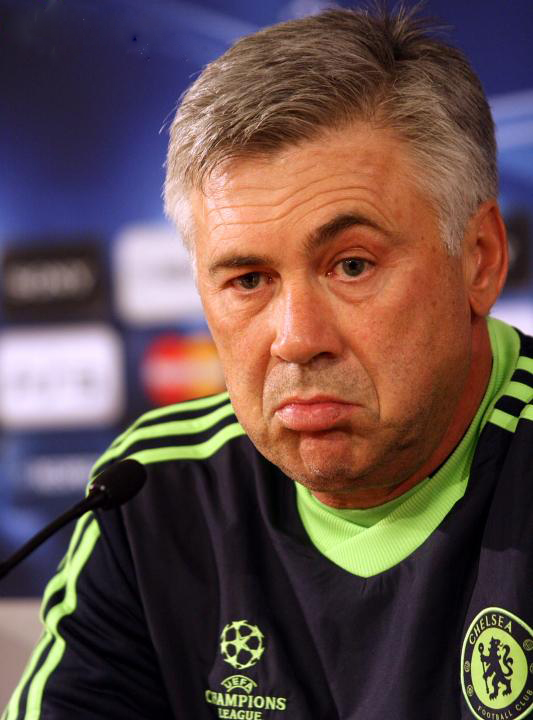
Ancelotti with Chelsea in October 2010

Chelsea's next defeat of the season came against Liverpool at Anfield on 7 November 2010, where they lost 0–2 with both goals coming from Fernando Torres. A week later, Chelsea suffered their second Premier League defeat in three matches with a remarkable 0–3 home defeat to Sunderland. In their following five league games, they lost two and drew three games, culminating in a 1–3 loss to Arsenal at the Emirates Stadium. On 5 January 2011, Chelsea suffered a shock 0–1 defeat at struggling Wolverhampton Wanderers, leaving them fifth in the league and in real danger of missing out on a Champions League place for the first time since 2002. This result led to Ancelotti ruling out Chelsea's chances of retaining the title, insisting that he did not fear that he would be dismissed. After this match, however, Chelsea's form began to improve. First with a 7–0 thrashing of Ipswich Town in the FA Cup at Stamford Bridge, and then a 2–0 victory over Blackburn, followed by emphatic away wins against Bolton Wanderers and Sunderland, putting them in fourth position in the league, though still ten points behind leaders Manchester United.

On 31 January 2011, Chelsea signed Liverpool striker Fernando Torres for a then-British record fee of £50 million, and Benfica defender David Luiz for £22 million. Chelsea lost 0–1 to Liverpool at Stamford Bridge but beat league leaders Manchester United on 1 March in a 2–1 comeback win that saw David Luiz net his first goal for Chelsea, which was followed by a 3–1 win away to Blackpool. Chelsea were later defeated by Manchester United at home and away (aggregate of 1–3) in the Champions League quarter-finals.

Following their defeat in the Champions League, Chelsea made a remarkable comeback in the league, defeating Wigan 1–0 at home, West Brom 3–1 away, Birmingham City 3–1, West Ham United 3–0 and Tottenham 2–1 at home. Chelsea, who at one point were fifth and 15 points behind leaders Manchester United, vaulted into the second position the league, just three points behind them with three games left of the season. On 8 May, Chelsea lost 1–2 against Manchester United at Old Trafford to stay second in the league, now six points behind the leaders with just two more games to play.

Ancelotti was dismissed less than two hours after a 0–1 away defeat against Everton on 22 May 2011, Chelsea's last Premier League match of the season. They had finished the 2010–11 Premier League in second place. He reportedly received a severance payment of £6 million from Chelsea. Ancelotti finished with a record of 67 wins, 20 draws and 22 losses in 109 matches. Ancelotti's win percentage at Chelsea was (as of May 2016) the third-highest in Premier League history, behind only José Mourinho and Alex Ferguson.

=== Paris Saint-Germain ===
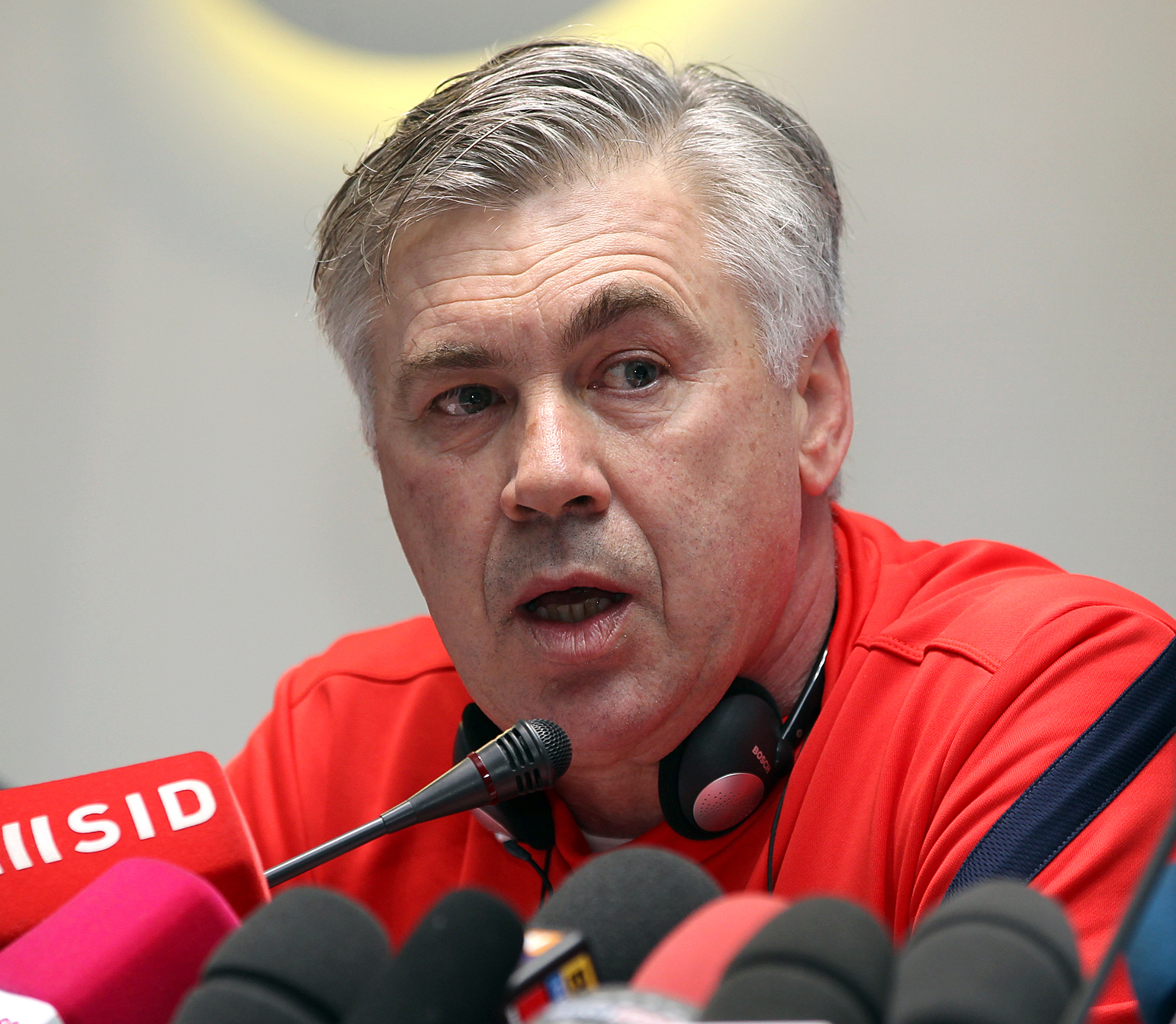
Ancelotti with Paris Saint-Germain in 2012

On 30 December 2011, with Paris Saint-Germain at the top of the Ligue 1 with three points down to Montpellier, Ancelotti was appointed as the new manager of the club on the same day as their previous manager, Antoine Kombouaré, was released from his contract. His debut was on 4 January 2012, in a 1–0 defeat to Milan in the United Arab Emirates, with a goal from his former player Alexandre Pato, in the Dubai Challenge Cup, a friendly tournament in which PSG finished as runner-up. On 21 March 2012, Ancelotti experienced his first competitive defeat in charge of PSG as the club fell to a 1–3 defeat at the hands of Lyon in a Coupe de France quarter-final match. Ten days later, PSG suffered their first Ligue 1 defeat under Ancelotti when they lost 1–2 away to Nancy. PSG ended up as runners-up in Ligue 1 in Ancelotti's first season in charge, three points behind winners Montpellier. He also took PSG to the Coupe de France quarter-finals. The club were eliminated from the Coupe de la Ligue and UEFA Europa League prior to Ancelotti's appointment.

During Ancelotti's first full season at the club, PSG entered the winter break at the top of the Ligue 1 table, ahead of Lyon and Marseille on goal difference. They clinched the Ligue 1 title on 12 May 2013, with two matches to spare. The club reached the quarter-finals of the Champions League, where they lost to Barcelona on the away goals rule (3–3 on aggregate), the quarter-finals of the Coupe de France and the quarter-finals of the Coupe de la Ligue. On 19 May 2013, Ancelotti asked to leave the club, in order to join Real Madrid.

=== Real Madrid ===
On 25 June 2013, Ancelotti became the manager of Real Madrid, replacing the departing José Mourinho, and signing a three-year contract. He was introduced at a press conference at the Santiago Bernabéu, where it was also announced that Zinedine Zidane and Paul Clement would be his assistant coaches. Shortly following his arrival, Real Madrid confirmed the signing of Isco for a fee of €24 million, which was followed by the signing of Asier Illarramendi for €32 million. Argentinean striker Gonzalo Higuaín left the club for €40 million to Napoli. This, along with the sale of Mesut Özil to Arsenal, paved the way for Gareth Bale's signing from Tottenham Hotspur for then-world record fee of £86 million (€105M). In Ancelotti's first league game in charge, on 18 August 2013, Real Madrid started the season by winning 2–1 at home against Real Betis. Ancelotti eventually deviated from the 4–2–3–1 formation that had been deployed by his predecessor José Mourinho, switching instead to a 4–3–3 formation to great effect, in which Argentine winger Ángel Di María particularly excelled as a left-sided central midfielder, and played a key role in the club's successes.

On 16 April 2014, Ancelotti won his first major trophy as Real Madrid manager after they defeated Barcelona 2–1 in the Copa del Rey final held at the Mestalla Stadium. On 29 April, Real Madrid defeated Bayern Munich in the semi-finals of the Champions League by an aggregate score of 5–0 (1–0 in Madrid and 0–4 in Munich), with Los Blancos reaching their first final since they last won the competition in 2002. Madrid finished third in the La Liga, accumulating 87 points in total (level with Barcelona, losing out on the second place on a tie-breaker, and three behind champions Atlético Madrid). On 24 May, Real Madrid won their tenth Champions League trophy, after defeating recently crowned rivals Atlético Madrid in the final 4–1 after extra time. Ancelotti became only the second manager after Liverpool's Bob Paisley to win the competition on three occasions, and the first man to win the Champions League/European Cup twice as a player and three times as a manager to this day.

On 12 August, Ancelotti started the new season by winning another European trophy, leading Real Madrid to a 2–0 victory over Sevilla in the 2014 UEFA Super Cup. In the last four months of 2014, his team set a Spanish record of 22 consecutive victories in all competitions that began on 16 September and culminated with Real Madrid's first FIFA Club World Cup title in December 2014, finishing the year with four trophies. On 1 December 2014, Ancelotti was nominated as one of the three finalists for the 2014 FIFA World Coach of the Year Award. On 19 January 2015, Ancelotti was inducted into the Italian Football Hall of Fame and on 20 January 2015, he won the IFFHS 2014 Award as The World's Best Club Coach. Real Madrid finished the 2014–15 season in second place with 92 points, two off treble-winning Barcelona, and scoring a record 118 goals in the process. They were eliminated in the round of 16 of the Copa del Rey by Atlético Madrid, whom they faced eight times throughout the season (including the UCL quarter-finals), and lost 3–2 on aggregate to Juventus in the Champions League semi-finals. On 25 May 2015, Real Madrid president Florentino Pérez announced that the club's board had taken "a very difficult decision" to relieve Ancelotti of his duties with immediate effect. Pérez stated that Ancelotti had won the hearts of both the board and fans, and would always have a place in the club's history because he was the coach that led them to the Décima. "However at this club the demands are huge and we need a new impulse in order to win trophies and be at our best," he added.

After leaving Madrid, Ancelotti held talks about a return to Milan, which he rejected, saying: "It was hard to say no to such a beloved club to me, but I need some rest. I wish them the best". He stated that he wanted to take a year off and undergo an operation for his spinal stenosis. He later relocated to Vancouver, Canada.

=== Bayern Munich ===
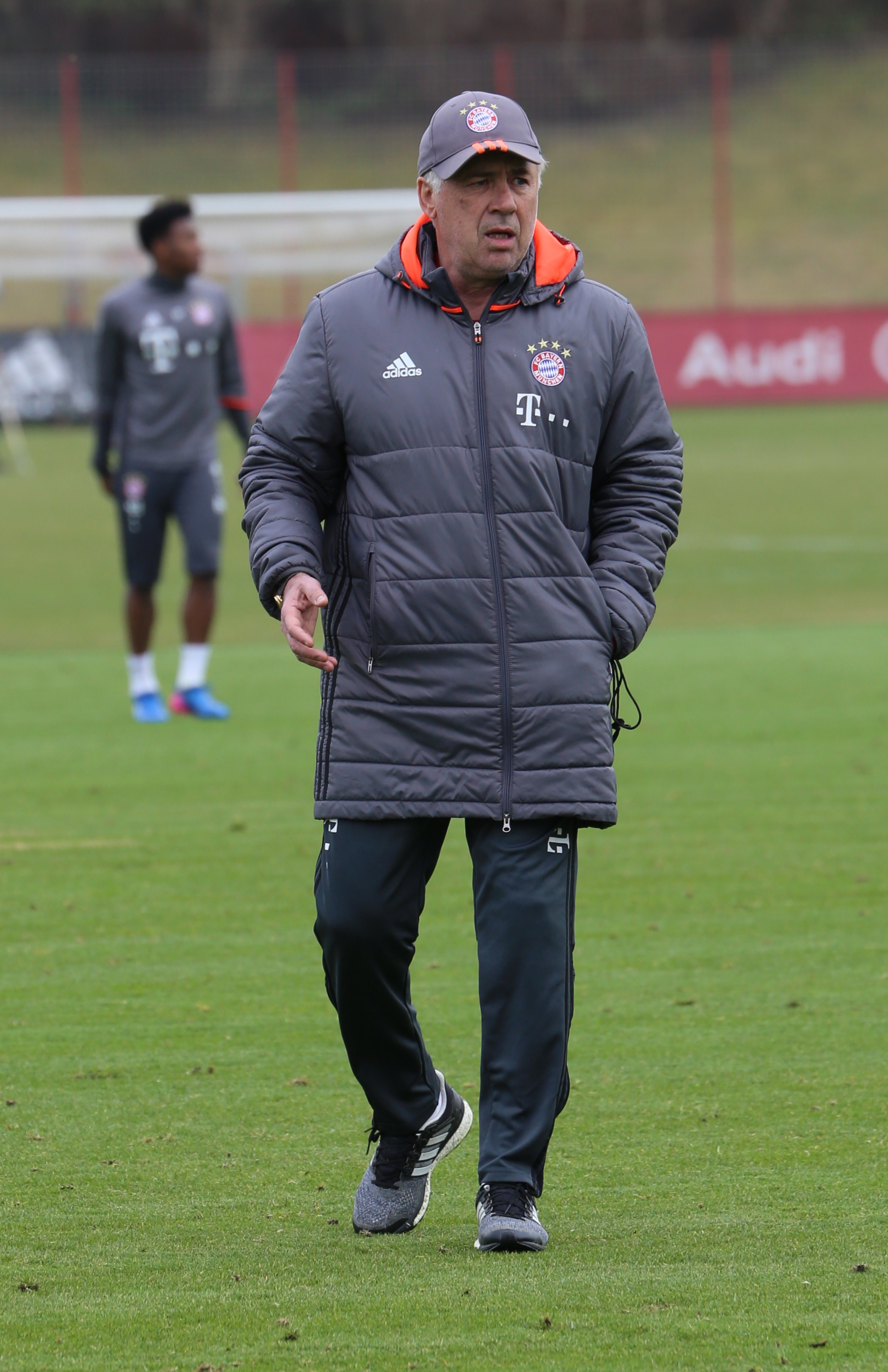
Ancelotti with Bayern Munich in 2017

On 20 December 2015, Bayern Munich CEO Karl-Heinz Rummenigge confirmed that Ancelotti would replace Pep Guardiola as manager for the 2016–17 season, signing a three-year contract. His contract started on 1 July 2016. His first training session was on 11 July 2016, and his first match was a pre-season win against SV Lippstadt. His first match at Allianz Arena was a 1–0 pre–season win over his predecessor Guardiola's Manchester City. Bayern participated in the International Champions Cup. In the first match, Bayern lost to Milan in a shootout. In the second match, Bayern defeated Inter Milan. In the final match, Bayern lost to Real Madrid.

On 14 August 2016, Bayern defeated Borussia Dortmund 2–0 in the 2016 DFL-Supercup. This was his first trophy as Bayern's manager. On 26 August 2016, in his Bundesliga debut, Bayern defeated Werder Bremen 6–0. In addition to defeating Borussia Dortmund, Carl Zeiss Jena and Werder Bremen, they defeated Schalke 04, Rostov, Ingolstadt 04, Hertha BSC and Hamburger SV to win his first eight matches as head coach, before losing to Atlético Madrid. They continued their winless streak against FC Köln and Eintracht Frankfurt, before beating PSV. After the win against Eindhoven, Bayern went on a three match winless streak. Bayern drew against 1899 Hoffenheim and lost against Borussia Dortmund and Rostov, before defeating Bayer Leverkusen. On 29 April, Ancelotti led Bayern to their fifth consecutive Bundesliga title and their 27th overall, following a 6–0 away win over VfL Wolfsburg. However, Bayern were eliminated in the Champions League in a quarter-final clash against Ancelotti's former team Real Madrid. They also lost 3–2 to Borussia Dortmund in the DFB-Pokal semi-finals.

On 5 August 2017, Ancelotti started the 2017–18 season with Bayern Munich by retaining the DFL-Supercup, beating out Borussia Dortmund 5–4 on penalties, following a 2–2 draw after 90 minutes; this was the sixth time that Bayern had managed to win the title. However, on 28 September 2017, Ancelotti was dismissed as manager of Bayern Munich, following a 3–0 away loss to Paris Saint-Germain in the club's second group match of the 2017–18 Champions League the night before. After the Paris Saint-Germain match, reports surfaced that Ancelotti had lost the dressing room. It was reported that five senior players wanted Ancelotti out as manager, which Bayern's president Uli Hoeneß later confirmed. Questions were also raised about Ancelotti's tactical setup and team selection against Paris Saint-Germain, when he left several key players on the bench, and one was left to watch the match from the stands.

=== Napoli ===
On 23 May 2018, Ancelotti was appointed as head coach of Napoli, signing a three-year contract, replacing Maurizio Sarri in the role. On 19 August, he made his return to the Serie A, winning his first match as manager with a 2–1 away victory over Lazio. Napoli suffered a first round elimination in the Champions League, the first time since 2000 that Ancelotti failed to advance from this stage of the competition. Napoli eventually finished the 2018–19 Serie A season in second place, twelve points behind champions Juventus, and reached the quarter-finals of the Europa League, losing out to Arsenal.

On 10 December 2019, Ancelotti was dismissed, despite a 4–0 home win against Genk in their final 2019–20 UEFA Champions League match of the group stage that ensured Napoli's advancement to the round of 16; the club were in joint–seventh place in Serie A, alongside Parma, at the time, and had not won a league game in seven matches. The decision came after a summit with Napoli president Aurelio De Laurentiis that had followed the match that was originally scheduled for 11 December.

=== Everton ===
On 21 December 2019, Ancelotti was appointed as manager of Everton on a four-and-a-half-year contract. His first match in charge was a 1–0 home victory over Burnley on 26 December. On 1 March 2020, Ancelotti was sent off after the full-time whistle, following an on-pitch conversation with referee Chris Kavanagh, who had ruled out a would-be late match-winning goal against Manchester United, due to an offside that was determined by VAR. He was charged with misconduct by the FA the following day. Ancelotti went on to record a total of eight wins, five draws and six losses in the league in his first season with the Blues, as Everton finished in 12th place.

During the close-season, Ancelotti signed his former players James Rodríguez and Allan, along with Ben Godfrey, Abdoulaye Doucouré, Niels Nkounkou and loanee Robin Olsen. Everton started the 2020–21 season with seven consecutive wins in all competitions, and Ancelotti was named September's Premier League Manager of the Month. After a drop in form, a resumption of good results saw Everton end 2020 in fourth place, but knocked out of the EFL Cup, losing 2–0 to Manchester United in the quarter-final. Results for the remainder of the season were mixed, and Everton finished the season in 10th place.

=== Return to Real Madrid ===
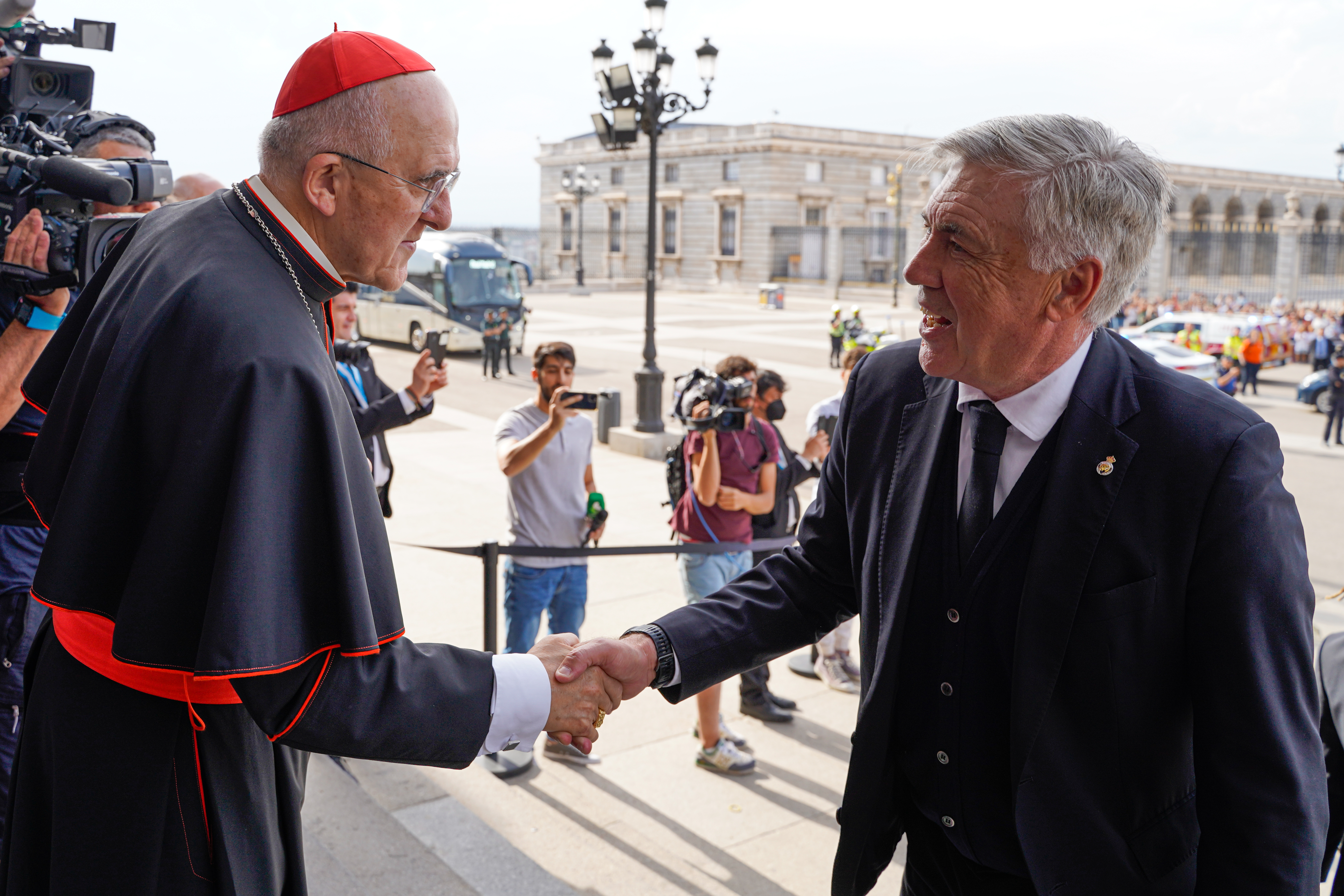
Carlo Ancelotti with Archbishop of Madrid Carlos Osoro Sierra during Real Madrid's 2022 Champions League celebration at the Virgin of Almudena

On 1 June 2021, Ancelotti resigned from his position at Everton to rejoin Real Madrid, following Zidane's resignation, signing a contract until 2024. On 19 September 2021, Ancelotti reached the milestone of 800 league matches with clubs from the top five European leagues. On the domestic front, he delivered two trophies out of a possible three, winning La Liga and the Supercopa de España. Thus, Ancelotti won all six available top trophies at Madrid, in addition to becoming the first manager to win all of Europe's top five leagues. Real Madrid's 5–4 aggregate win over defending champions Chelsea in the Champions League quarter-finals saw him become the first manager to reach the Champions League semi-finals in four different decades (the 1990s, 2000s, 2010s, and 2020s). In the Champions League final against Liverpool, Ancelotti's record fifth in the competition, a lone Vinícius goal sealed the 14th European Cup for Los Blancos, and Ancelotti's second in charge. Real also claimed their fourth ever European double. With this win, Ancelotti became the first manager in history to win four Champions League titles. Ancelotti placed second in the 2022 Best FIFA Men's Coach award, behind winner Lionel Scaloni.

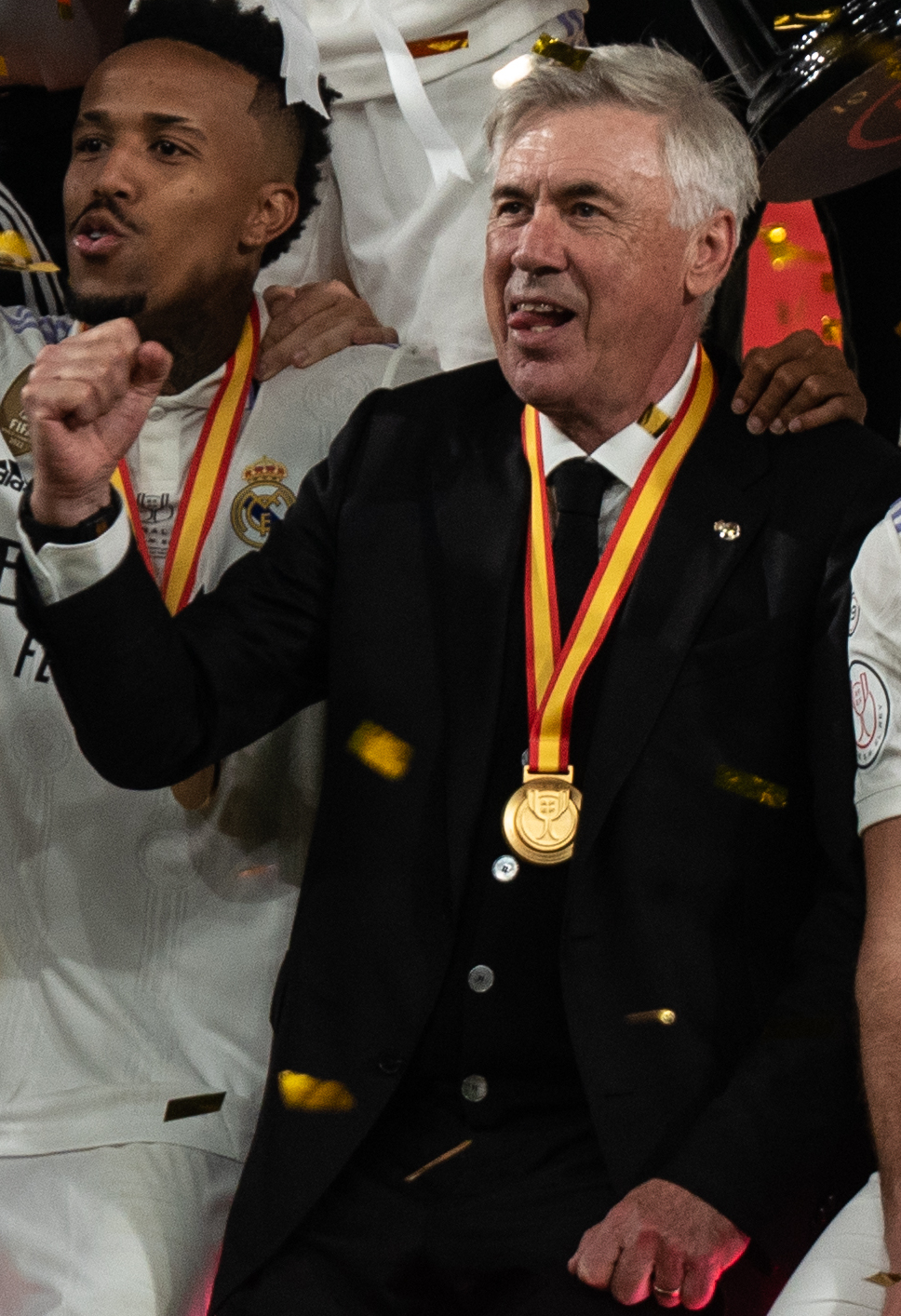
Ancelotti celebrating Real Madrid's 2023 Copa del Rey win

At the start of the 2022–23 season, Ancelotti guided his club to a UEFA Super Cup victory, his eighth trophy at Madrid. On 2 November 2022, he broke Ferguson's record for most victories in the Champions League, after a 5–1 win over Celtic in the first round, which was his 103rd victory in the competition; the result also allowed Real Madrid to top their group and advance to the round of 16. On 11 February 2023, Ancelotti guided them to a fifth FIFA Club World Cup trophy, as Real Madrid beat Al Hilal 5–3 in the final. Real Madrid finished the season second to Barcelona in La Liga, and were also defeated by eventual champions Manchester City in the Champions League semi-finals 5–1 on aggregate, but beat Osasuna 2–1 to win the 2022–23 Copa del Rey. In the second leg of the Champions League semi-finals, a 4–0 away defeat against Manchester City on 7 May, Ancelotti overtook Ferguson as the manager with the most appearances as a manager in the Champions League (191).

Managing to win all three opening matches of Madrid's 2023–24 league campaign, he was named La Liga's Coach of the Month in August. With his team's 2–1 victory over Real Sociedad on 17 September 2023, Ancelotti got his 173rd Madrid win, overtaking Zinedine Zidane to become the coach with the second most wins in the club's history. On 29 December, although he had previously been linked with the position of head coach for the Brazil national football team, Real Madrid announced that Ancelotti had agreed to a contract extension until 30 June 2026.

In the first leg of the 2023–24 UEFA Champions League quarter-finals – a 3–3 home draw against defending champions Manchester City on 9 April 2024, Ancelotti became the first manager to make 200 appearances in the competition. In the second leg on 17 April, Real Madrid overcame Manchester City 4–3 on penalties to advance to the semi-finals of the competition, following a 4–4 draw on aggregate; the result meant that Ancelotti equalled Pep Guardiola's record of reaching the Champions League semi-finals on ten different occasions as a manager. Following rivals Barcelona's 4–2 defeat to Girona on 4 May, Ancelotti's Real Madrid clinched the league title mathematically; Real Madrid had defeated Cadíz 3–0 the previous day. With his twelfth title for the club overall, he overtook Zidane as the manager with the second–most title victories with Real Madrid, behind only Miguel Muñoz (14). In the second leg of the Champions League semi-finals on 9 May, Real Madrid made a late comeback to achieve a 2–1 home win over Bayern Munich and advance to the 2024 UEFA Champions League final 4–3 on aggregate, against Borussia Dortmund at Wembley, Ancelotti's record sixth final in the competition. On 1 June, Real Madrid defeated Borussia Dortmund 2–0 to win their 15th Champions League's trophy, and Ancelotti's fifth title. Two months later, on 14 August, he achieved his record fifth UEFA Super Cup trophy with a 2–0 victory over Atalanta, becoming the joint most decorated coach in the club's history along with Miguel Muñoz with 14 titles. Later that year, on 18 December, he clinched his record-breaking 15th title with the club following a 3–0 victory over Pachuca in the FIFA Intercontinental Cup final.

In the 2024–25 season, Ancelotti led Real Madrid through a series of high-profile matches in both domestic and European competitions. In the quarter-finals, Real Madrid faced Arsenal. The first leg at the Emirates Stadium saw Arsenal secure a 3–0 victory, putting Madrid at a significant disadvantage. In the return leg at the Santiago Bernabéu, Arsenal won 2–1, resulting in a 5–1 aggregate defeat for Real Madrid and ending their Champions League campaign.

Domestically, Ancelotti's Real Madrid faced Barcelona in multiple competitions. In the Supercopa de España final on 12 January 2025, Barcelona defeated Real Madrid 5–2, with Raphinha scoring twice for the Catalan side. On 26 April 2025, the two teams met in the Copa del Rey final, where Barcelona emerged victorious with a 3–2 win after extra time, courtesy of a late goal by Jules Koundé. In La Liga, the El Clásico on 11 May 2025 ended in a 4–3 defeat for Real Madrid, despite a hat-trick from Kylian Mbappé, effectively ending their title hopes, with Barcelona going on to win the league on 15 May.

On 23 May 2025, Real Madrid officially announced that Ancelotti would leave the club at the end of the season. He was replaced by former player Xabi Alonso, whom he had managed at Madrid and Bayern Munich.

=== Brazil ===
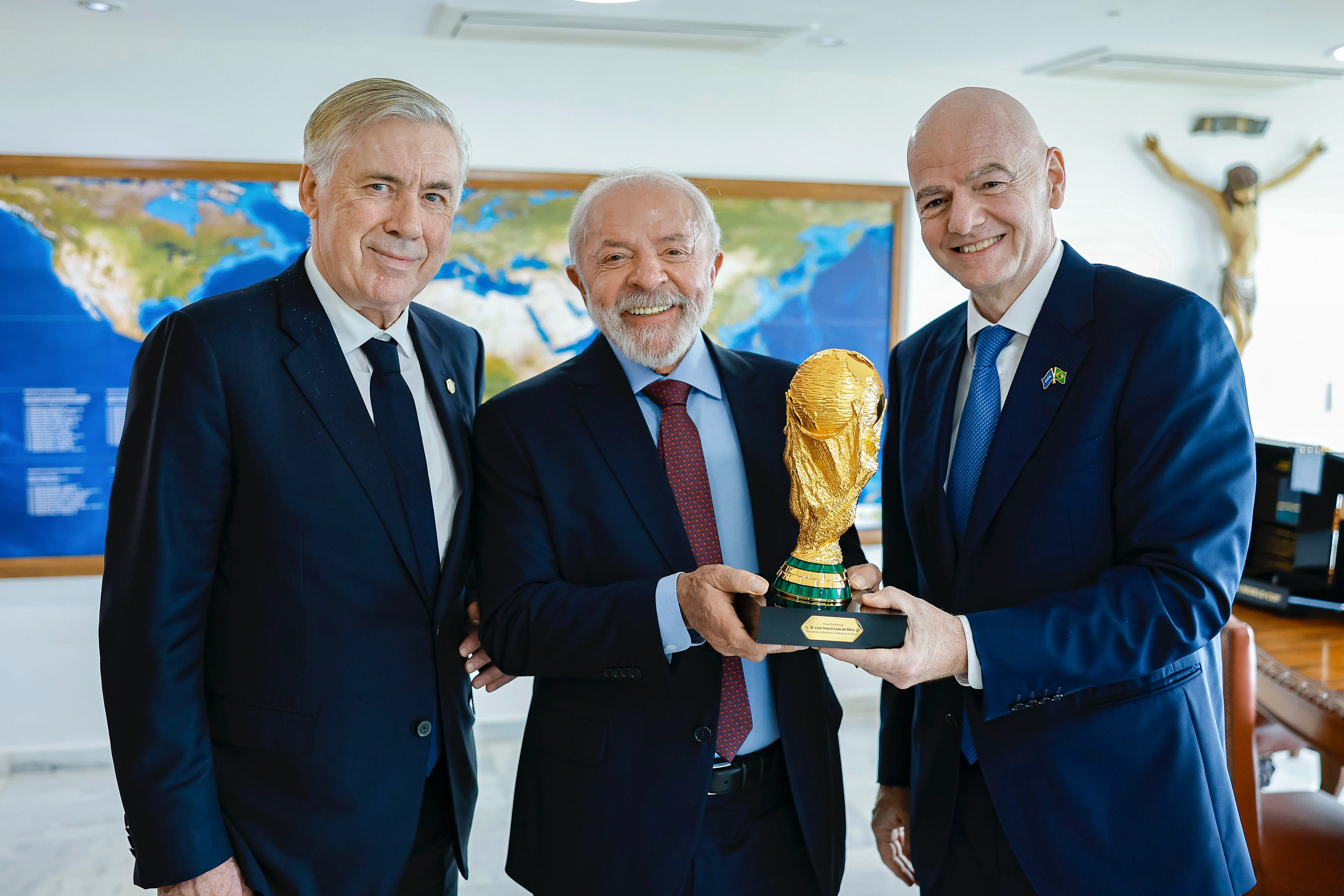
Ancelotti (left) alongside Brazilian President Lula (center) and FIFA President Gianni Infantino (right) in 2026.

On 12 May 2025, the Brazilian Football Confederation appointed Ancelotti as the new manager of the Brazil national team. He signed a one‑year deal worth €10 million, with a €5 million bonus if he wins the World Cup. Brazil is Ancelotti's first international experience as a full-time coach; he was an assistant to Italy coach Arrigo Sacchi at the 1994 World Cup. On 26 May, he made his first call-up by naming a 25-man squad for the 2026 FIFA World Cup qualification matches against Ecuador and Paraguay. He made his debut on 5 June, in a goalless draw against Ecuador, and his first win against Paraguay on 10 June which lead to their qualification spot for the 2026 FIFA World Cup.

On 14 May 2026, Ancelotti renewed his contract as Brazil coach for another four years through to the 2030 FIFA World Cup.

On 13 June, Brazil opened its World Cup campaign with a 1–1 draw against Morocco. The team followed up with decisive wins over Haiti and Scotland, advancing to the round of 32 as the top team in their group. There, they triumphed 2–1 over Japan, but were ultimately eliminated by Norway in the following round after a 2–1 defeat, the first time Brazil had failed to reach the quarter-finals since 1990. Following the match, Ancelotti's decision to have Bruno Guimarães take a penalty in the first half – from which he failed to score – over Vinícius was questioned in the media; Ancelotti clarified that the decision was based on a statistical analysis of the best penalty takers in the starting XI. Despite this poor showing, and criticism from former Brazilian international and 1994 World Cup-winner Romário, Carlo Ancelotti was backed by numerous other Brazilian legends, current players and pundits, as well as the CBF, to continue his work of rebuilding the side to prepare for the 2030 FIFA World Cup. On 14 November 2026, Ancelotti was sent off due to dissent after a late winner by Japan in an international friendly against Brazil. This was his first red card ever received in his international managerial career.

== Manager profile ==
=== Style of management ===
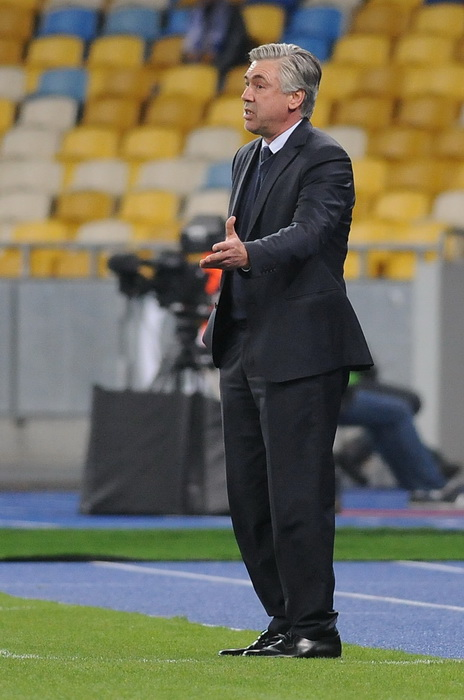
Ancelotti coaching his players from the technical area in 2012

Toward the beginning of his coaching career, and during his time with Parma, Ancelotti preferred to use a rigorous 4–4–2 formation, which made use of heavy pressing, and drew influence from that of his AC Milan and Italy coach Arrigo Sacchi, and which he believed to be the most successful system for his team; however, this system did not allow for more creative forwards, such as Gianfranco Zola, Hristo Stoichkov and Roberto Baggio, to play in their preferred positions, and ultimately led to Zola and Stoichkov's departure from the club, while Baggio's transfer to Parma in 1997 was impeded by Ancelotti. Ancelotti later stated that he regretted his intransigence, and when he joined Juventus, he abandoned his favoured 4–4–2 in favour of a 3–4–1–2 system, in order to accommodate Zinedine Zidane in his preferred advanced playmaking role behind the forwards.

"I said, 'No, you have to play striker.' Baggio went to another club. That year Baggio scored 25 [actually 22] goals – for Bologna! I lost 25 goals! Big mistake."

— Ancelotti talking to Simon Kuper of the Financial Times in 2014, recalling his regret in choosing the 4–4–2 system over signing Roberto Baggio in the lead-up to the 1997–98 season with Parma.

Despite Ancelotti's initial reputation as a tactically inflexible coach, with Milan, he later drew praise for his ability to find systems which would best suit his players, and which allowed several talented and creative players to co-exist; under Ancelotti's management, the club enjoyed one of the most fruitful spells in its history. Ancelotti's Milan sides almost always used a strong four-man back-line, a main striker and an attacking midfielder. In his first seasons with the club, although he was initially criticised by the club's president Silvio Berlusconi, due to his supposedly defensive tactics, Ancelotti was able to implement a more creative playing style based on possession when he adopted a 4–3–1–2, 4–1–2–1–2 or 4–4–2 diamond formation. While still preserving the team's strong defensive line, he converted attacking midfielder Andrea Pirlo to a deep-lying playmaker, which saw him play in a seemingly defensive midfield role in front of the back-line, and behind the team's advanced playmaker, either Rui Costa or Rivaldo, giving the Italian more time on the ball to orchestrate the team's attacking moves from deeper areas, or to create goalscoring opportunities for the team's prolific strikers with his accurate long passing ability; the team's two playmakers were supported defensively by box-to-box midfielders on either side of them in the midfield diamond. Due to competition from Alessandro Nesta, Paolo Maldini, Roque Júnior, Dario Šimić, and later Jaap Stam in defence, he also converted former centre-back Alessandro Costacurta to a defensive left-back, alternating him with Kakha Kaladze or Giuseppe Pancaro, while, due to the club's narrow midfield, the club's attacking right-back, Cafu, was given licence to attack and provide width to the team; due to Cafu's offensive capabilities, Ancelotti occasionally fielded a 4–4–1–1 or 3–4–1–2 formation, which saw Cafu used as an outright winger, along with Serginho or Marek Jankulovski on the left.

After the departure of one of the club's main strikers at the beginning of the 2006–07 season, Andriy Shevchenko, Ancelotti redesigned Milan's line-up, devising a 4–3–2–1 system, later known as his "Christmas Tree" formation. Milan's line-up used either Filippo Inzaghi or Alberto Gilardino as a lone striker, supported by two attacking midfielders, Clarence Seedorf and Kaká, in front of a three-man midfield which once again featured Andrea Pirlo as a deep-lying playmaker, supported by two hard-working defensive midfielders, such as Gennaro Gattuso, Massimo Ambrosini, or Cristian Brocchi.

Moving to Chelsea, in the 2009–10 season Ancelotti continued with the 4–4–2 diamond formation used previously at Milan, often with Michael Essien or Mikel John Obi in the defensive role, Michael Ballack or Frank Lampard as box-to-box midfielders and Deco in a creative role, with full-backs Ashley Cole and José Bosingwa pushing forward and providing width to the narrow midfield. Later in the season the Africa Cup of Nations left Chelsea without strikers Salomon Kalou or Didier Drogba, as well as midfielders Essien and Mikel, making it more difficult to employ a 4–4–2 formation, so Ancelotti switched to the 4–3–2–1 "Christmas Tree" formation he had also used at Milan, using Joe Cole and Florent Malouda to support lone striker Nicolas Anelka. He also used the 4–2–3–1 and 4–3–3 to be less predictable and better use creative players like Lampard and Malouda.

At Real Madrid, Ancelotti similarly drew praise for his versatility; he modified the team's 4–2–3–1 formation, which had been used under José Mourinho, to a 4–4–2 formation, before settling on a 4–3–3 formation, in which Argentine former winger Ángel Di María was converted to a left-sided central midfielder, while Cristiano Ronaldo was played in his preferred free role on the left wing rather than as a striker, as Ancelotti had initially intended. Di María particularly excelled in this new role and played a key role in the club's successes. Ancelotti later explained that his use of Ronaldo in a free role on the left flank was due to the fact that the winger's style of play was less suited to playing with his back to goal as a centre-forward; the wider role instead allowed him space to roam freely around the attack. Striker Karim Benzema was instead tasked with acting as a false 9 in the centre, while Gareth Bale played as an inverted winger on the opposite flank to Ronaldo. Although he initially sought to use an offensive, possession-based style, he instead adopted a quick counter-attacking style, as he noticed that his players were more suited to attacking in that manner.

In addition to Sacchi, Ancelotti has also cited his former Roma manager Nils Liedholm, and his youth coach Bruno Mora as major influences. The positive leadership style of his Roma manager Sven-Göran Eriksson also inspired Ancelotti's own coaching style. In addition to Ancelotti's tactical prowess and adaptability, he has also drawn praise for his kindness, good humour, and his calm, balanced approach as a manager, as well as his ability to motivate his players and cultivate a good relationship with them, and foster a united, winning team environment, although he has also been known to lose his temper at times. During Ancelotti's first season with Bayern Munich, Spanish midfielder Thiago praised Ancelotti for the freedom he gave the players to express themselves and for the confidence with which he instilled them; Ancelotti commented on the tactical changes he implemented at Bayern Munich, stating "[t]he main change is we press a bit more intermittently and we try to play more directly, more vertically", also adding that "if you're organised even an ordinary player can do very well because he'll have options and he'll know where they are and how to find them. But when you get to the final third, everything changes. That's where you need creativity and freedom because without it you only have sterile possession. Especially if your opponent's defence is organised and has been paying attention."

"The most important role is never that of the coach. I am very clear that there are two types of coaches: those who do nothing and those who do a lot of damage. I try to be in the first group. The game belongs to the players and you can tell them a certain strategy, convince them, but then the determining factor is their quality and commitment. A coach has to focus on making the group understand the importance of teamwork."

— Ancelotti highlighting the importance of player management skills over tactics as a coach ahead of Real Madrid's first leg match of the 2023–24 UEFA Champions League semi-finals against Bayern Munich.

During Ancelotti's second spell at Real Madrid, although he implemented a simple but effective counter-attacking style with the team, Ancelotti once again earned praise in the media for his balanced approach, and adaptability during the club's run to a Liga–Champions League double; his ability to develop a strong relationship with his players and his willingness to consult them on tactical decisions were singled out by several pundits in particular as reasons for the team's success and unity. Regarding this aspect of his coaching philosophy, he commented in 2022: "I think that the methodology of training in football has changed a lot in the last 20 years. So I've had to be ready to change my style and my idea of football, because the rules have changed. It's a completely different sport. But what hasn't changed is my relationship with the players. That's the same." In contrast to his first spell in the Spanish capital, Benzema was now given a free attacking role, becoming the focal point of the team's offensive line; this new role enabled the striker to be extremely prolific, which was a key component to the team's success.

In an episode of Universo Valdano in 2022, Ancelotti commented on his coaching style in the latter part of his career: "I am not an obsessive person. I like football a lot, it's a passion of mine, but I try to keep things as simple as possible. Football for me isn't complicated." He also said that he preferred to instruct his players on the defensive part of the game – as it requires more organisation – rather than the attacking aspect of the game, so as not to stifle their creativity going forward. He later also commented on his style in 2023 in comparison to other managers: "The mistakes that the new generation of coaches make is that they give too much information to the players about the game in possession. I'm old school and I think this takes a bit of creativity away. It's one thing to tell them the position without the ball, where you have to work hard and play as a team, but in possession, if they're comfortable when they come a bit wider, I'm not going to tell them to go inside. It's an individual interpretation of the game with the ball and I don't want to take away each player's creativity."

In an interview with The Times, in the lead-up to the 2024 Champions League final, Ancelotti commented on the limits of teams having "only one identity", also adding that his "style" was "not recognised" because he changed. He said that against Roberto De Zerbi's Shakhtar Donetsk, en route to the 2022 Champions League title, he instructed his players not to press them, so that they would not play through the team. He also referenced the low block that Real Madrid successfully employed against Manchester City in the knock-out stages as an example of his tactical pragmatism, as his sides normally play with a more offensive style. He elaborated that during the 2023–24 season he used a 4–3–1–2 without a genuine forward, in order to compensate for the departure of striker Benzema. Jude Bellingham served as a goalscoring attacking midfielder, with additional creative and defensive responsibilities, acting almost as a false 9 or second striker at times, and playing behind Vinícius Júnior and Rodrygo – normally wingers – upfront in free roles. Bellingham flourished in this position, with Ancelotti earning praise from Ben Grounds of Sky Sports for fielding him in this new role. While Vinícius and Rodrygo were still given the freedom to move out wide in attack, Ancelotti also focused on developing their ability to play more effectively in central areas. He also used a 4–4–2 formation at times throughout the season. Despite injuries to three of his team's key players – Thibaut Courtois, David Alaba and Éder Militão – Real Madrid won another Liga–Champions League double that season, with Ancelotti noting that "attitude and commitment" were "the key to overcoming all the problems" the club had faced.

=== Reception ===
Nicknamed Don Carlo by the Spanish media, and Re Carlo in the Italian press ("King Charles" in Italian), Ancelotti is regarded as one of the greatest and most successful managers of all time, and has drawn praise in the press for his longevity as well as his record-breaking achievements. Despite becoming the first manager to win the league title in the top five European football leagues, Ancelotti's domestic record, and his lack of numerous league titles in comparison to his record-breaking success in European club competitions, has occasionally been criticised in the media. In 2015, Miguel Delaney of ESPN concluded that Ancelotti's more relaxed management style is more suited to winning cup competitions that are "far more open to blind luck and all the one-off nuances", in contrast to autocratic managers like Pep Guardiola, Sir Alex Ferguson, and José Mourinho, who have amassed better domestic records and more league championships. Ancelotti himself has also referenced this discrepancy in the title of his autobiography, which translates to "I prefer Cups".

Ancelotti's 2024–25 season featured four consecutive defeats to Barcelona under Hansi Flick, across La Liga, the 2025 Supercopa de España final, and the 2025 Copa del Rey final. The matches exposed structural weaknesses in Ancelotti's typically balanced 4–3–3 system, particularly when facing high-intensity pressing and rapid wide transitions. Flick's Barcelona consistently targeted the space behind Madrid's advancing full-backs, using wide overloads and fast switches of play to isolate Real Madrid's defenders. Ancelotti's midfield trio often struggled to cope with the verticality of Barcelona's attacking patterns, particularly when pressed into transitional moments. Despite Kylian Mbappé's hat-trick in the final La Liga match, Madrid's defensive line was repeatedly caught high and exposed by diagonal runs from Lamine Yamal and Raphinha. The sequence of defeats sparked criticism of Ancelotti's reluctance to adapt tactically, with analysts noting his adherence to familiar patterns even as Barcelona's pressing traps and wide combinations consistently unbalanced his team. The four defeats were viewed as a rare blemish on Ancelotti's otherwise pragmatic and adaptive managerial reputation. During his time at Real Madrid, Ancelotti also dismissed criticism that he was an "old-school" manager, citing his longevity and success as evidence of his adaptability. He was widely praised in the media during his time at the club for his man-management skills.

During his time with the Brazilian national team, Ancelotti was criticised in the media for implementing an atypical, more defensive style, in contrast to Brazil's historic association with joga bonito.

== Personal life ==
Ancelotti has two children: a daughter, and a son, Davide, who was his assistant coach at Everton and Real Madrid. Davide previously also played in the Milan youth team and joined Borgomanero in June 2008. In 2008, Ancelotti confirmed in an interview that he had broken up with his wife of 25 years, Luisa Gibellini. He subsequently dated Romanian Marina Crețu. In 2011, it was announced he was dating Canadian businesswoman Mariann Barrena McClay. Ancelotti and Barrena McClay married in Vancouver in July 2014. Ancelotti identifies as Catholic.

In May 2009, Ancelotti's autobiography, Preferisco la Coppa ("I Prefer the Cup", with a word-play by Ancelotti on the Italian word "coppa" that stands both for "cup" and a type of cured cold pork meat cut, which is produced in Ancelotti's native region of Emilia-Romagna), was published, with all proceeds from sales of the book going to the Fondazione Stefano Borgonovo for the funding of research on amyotrophic lateral sclerosis. In his last season with Chelsea, Ancelotti travelled back to Italy on a regular basis to visit his 87-year-old father who was in poor health with diabetes and other issues. On the issue, he said: "I don't have a problem managing the team for this reason. It's difficult, emotionally, when it's your father... but this is life. I have to do my best to stay close to him, but this is the life." His father died on 29 September 2010, aged 87.

On 31 January 2019, Ancelotti became the grandfather of twins, born to his son Davide's wife Ana Galocha. In February 2021, Ancelotti's home in Crosby was burgled and a safe stolen by two male offenders wearing black clothing and balaclavas. The safe was later found dumped in a car park in nearby Thornton. It had been forced open and stripped of its contents. Ancelotti is among the 13 sports personalities mentioned in the Pandora Papers published by the International Consortium of Investigative Journalists (ICIJ). On 11 October 2023, he received an honorary doctorate from the University of Parma, following his research in "Sciences and Techniques of Preventive and Adapted Motor Activities".

On 2 April 2025, Ancelotti stood trial for alleged tax evasion where he testified in a Spanish court, insisting he believed his tax affairs were in order amid allegations that he failed to pay €1 million ($1.08 million) in taxes on image rights revenue. On 9 July, Ancelotti was sentenced to a year in prison and received a fine of €386,361.93. However, under Spanish law, as any sentence under two years for a non-violent crime rarely requires a defendant without previous convictions to be imprisoned, Ancelotti was spared incarceration.

== Career statistics ==
=== Club ===
Appearances and goals by club, season and competition
Club	Season	League			Coppa Italia		Europe		Other		Total	
Club	Season	Division	Apps	Goals	Apps	Goals	Apps	Goals	Apps	Goals	Apps	Goals
Parma	1976–77	Serie C	1	0	—		—		—		1	0
Parma	1977–78	Serie C	21	8	—		—		—		21	8
Parma	1978–79	Serie C1	33	5	—		—		—		33	5
Parma	Total		55	13	—		—		—		55	13
Roma	1979–80	Serie A	27	3	9	0	—		—		36	3
Roma	1980–81	Serie A	29	2	6	2	2 (Note: Appearances in European Cup Winners' Cup)	1	—		37	5
Roma	1981–82	Serie A	5	0	0	0	3	1	—		8	1
Roma	1982–83	Serie A	23	2	3	0	6 (Note: Appearances in UEFA Cup)	0	—		32	2
Roma	1983–84	Serie A	9	0	5	0	4 (Note: Appearances in European Cup)	0	—		18	0
Roma	1984–85	Serie A	22	3	2	0	3	0	—		27	3
Roma	1985–86	Serie A	29	0	4	0	—		—		33	0
Roma	1986–87	Serie A	27	2	7	1	2	0	—		36	3
Roma	Total		171	12	36	3	20	2	—		227	17
AC Milan	1987–88	Serie A	27	2	7	0	4	0	—		38	2
AC Milan	1988–89	Serie A	28	2	2	0	7	1	1 (Note: Appearance in Supercoppa Italiana)	0	38	3
AC Milan	1989–90	Serie A	24	3	4	0	6	0	1 (Note: Appearance in Intercontinental Cup)	0	35	3
AC Milan	1990–91	Serie A	21	1	4	0	4	0	2 (Note: Appearances in European Super Cup)	0	31	1
AC Milan	1991–92	Serie A	12	2	6	0	—		—		18	2
AC Milan	Total		112	10	23	0	21	1	4	0	160	11
Career total			338	35	59	3	41	3	4	0	442	41

=== International ===
Appearances and goals by national team and year
National team	Year	Apps	Goals
Italy	1981	4	1
Italy	1982	0	0
Italy	1983	4	0
Italy	1984	0	0
Italy	1985	0	0
Italy	1986	5	0
Italy	1987	3	0
Italy	1988	5	0
Italy	1989	0	0
Italy	1990	4	0
Italy	1991	1	0
Total		26	1

Italy score listed first, score column indicates score after each Ancelotti goal

List of international goals scored by Carlo Ancelotti
Goal	Date	Venue	Opponent	Score	Result	Competition
1	6 January 1981	Estadio Centenario, Montevideo, Uruguay	Netherlands	1–0	1–1	1980 World Champions' Gold Cup

== Managerial statistics ==
As of match played 17 November 2026

Managerial record by team and tenure
Team	From	To	Record								
Team	From	To	G	W	D	L	GF	GA	GD	Win %	Ref
Reggiana	1 July 1995	30 June 1996	41	17	14	10	45	36	+9	41.46	
Parma	1 July 1996	30 June 1998	87	42	27	18	124	85	+39	48.28	
Juventus	9 February 1999	17 June 2001	114	63	33	18	185	101	+84	55.26	
AC Milan	6 November 2001	31 May 2009	420	238	101	81	706	373	+333	56.67	
Chelsea	1 July 2009	22 May 2011	109	67	20	22	241	94	+147	61.47	
Paris Saint-Germain	30 December 2011	25 June 2013	77	49	19	9	153	64	+89	63.64	
Real Madrid	25 June 2013	25 May 2015	119	89	14	16	321	101	+220	74.79	
Bayern Munich	1 July 2016	28 September 2017	60	42	9	9	156	50	+106	70.00	
Napoli	23 May 2018	10 December 2019	73	38	19	16	127	73	+54	52.05	
Everton	21 December 2019	1 June 2021	67	31	14	22	93	88	+5	46.27	
Real Madrid	1 June 2021	24 May 2025	234	161	36	37	512	238	+274	68.80	
Brazil	26 May 2025	Present	22	13	4	5	54	21	+33	59.09	
Career Total			1,423	851	309	263	2,717	1,325	+1392	59.80	

== Honours ==
=== Player ===
Roma

- Serie A: 1982–83
- Coppa Italia: 1979–80, 1980–81, 1983–84, 1985–86

AC Milan

- Serie A: 1987–88, 1991–92
- Supercoppa Italiana: 1988
- European Cup: 1988–89, 1989–90
- European Super Cup: 1990
- Intercontinental Cup: 1989

Italy

- FIFA World Cup third place: 1990

Individual

- Serie A Team of The Year: 1983, 1986, 1988, 1990, 1991

=== Assistant manager ===
Italy

- FIFA World Cup runner-up: 1994

=== Manager ===
Juventus

- UEFA Intertoto Cup: 1999

AC Milan

- Serie A: 2003–04
- Coppa Italia: 2002–03
- Supercoppa Italiana: 2004
- UEFA Champions League: 2002–03, 2006–07; runner-up: 2004–05
- UEFA Super Cup: 2003, 2007
- FIFA Club World Cup: 2007

Chelsea

- Premier League: 2009–10
- FA Cup: 2009–10
- FA Community Shield: 2009

Paris Saint-Germain

- Ligue 1: 2012–13

Real Madrid

- La Liga: 2021–22, 2023–24
- Copa del Rey: 2013–14, 2022–23
- Supercopa de España: 2021–22, 2023–24
- UEFA Champions League: 2013–14, 2021–22, 2023–24
- UEFA Super Cup: 2014, 2022, 2024
- FIFA Club World Cup: 2014, 2022
- FIFA Intercontinental Cup: 2024

Bayern Munich

- Bundesliga: 2016–17
- DFL-Supercup: 2016, 2017

Individual

- The Best FIFA Football Coach: 2024
- Men's Johan Cruyff Trophy: 2024
- World Soccer World Manager of the Year: 2003, 2024
- Serie A Coach of the Year: 2001, 2004
- Panchina d'Oro: 2002–03, 2003–04
- Ligue 1 Coach of the Year: 2012–13 (joint)
- IFFHS World's Best Club Coach: 2007, 2014, 2022, 2024
- UEFA Coach of the Year: 2002–03
- UEFA Men's Coach of the Year: 2021–22
- Globe Soccer Awards Best Coach of the Year: 2014, 2022, 2024
- Onze d'Or Coach of the Year: 2021–22, 2022–23
- Premier League Manager of the Month: November 2009, August 2010, March 2011, April 2011, September 2020
- La Liga Manager of the Month: October 2014, April 2015, August 2023, April 2024
- Globe Soccer Awards Best Media Attraction in Football: 2014
- Enzo Bearzot Award: 2014
- FIFA World Coach of the Year runner-up: 2014
- Miguel Muñoz Trophy: 2021–22, 2014–15 (shared)
- Roma Hall of Fame: 2014
- Italian Football Hall of Fame: 2015
- AC Milan Hall of Fame
- Troféu Mesa Redonda Coach of the Year: 2025

=== Orders ===
- 5th Class / Knight: Cavaliere Ordine al Merito della Repubblica Italiana: 1991
- 4th Class / Ufficiale: Cavaliere dell'Ordine della Stella d'Italia: 2014

== See also ==
- List of European Cup and UEFA Champions League winning managers
- List of English football championship-winning managers
- List of football managers with the most matches
- List of FA Cup winning managers

== Bibliography ==
- Alessandro Alciato, Carlo Ancelotti, Preferisco la coppa. Vita, partite e miracoli di un normale fuoriclasse, Milan, Rizzoli, 2009, ISBN 88-17032-00-X (I Prefer the Cup. The Life, Games, and Miracles of an Ordinary Genius). (in Italian)
