= 1985–86 Full Members' Cup =

Tournament details
- Country: England
- Teams: 21

Final positions
- Champions: Chelsea (1st title)
- Runners-up: Manchester City
- Semifinalists: Hull City; Oxford United

Tournament statistics
- Matches played: 28
- Goals scored: 92 (3.29 per match)

The 1985-86 Full Members' Cup was the first edition of the tournament created to compensate for the ban on English clubs from European football following the Heysel Stadium disaster. It was won by Chelsea, who beat Manchester City 5–4 in the final at Wembley Stadium.

The tournament attracted just 21 entries from the 44 eligible clubs. Only five First Division clubs entered (Chelsea, Coventry City, Manchester City, Oxford United and West Bromwich Albion).

The second division teams that did not enter were Barnsley, Blackburn Rovers, Huddersfield Town, Norwich City, Oldham Athletic and Wimbledon.

== Southern section ==
=== First round ===
==== Group 1 ====
Pos	Team	Pld	W	D	L	GF	GA	GD	Pts	Qualification
1	Chelsea	2	2	0	0	6	1	+5	6	Advance to Semi-finals
2	Portsmouth	2	1	0	1	4	4	0	3	
3	Charlton Athletic	2	0	0	2	2	7	−5	0	

Source: FCHD

17 September 1985	Portsmouth (2)	4–1	Charlton Athletic (2)	Fratton Park
		Report

2 October 1985	Chelsea (1)	3–0	Portsmouth (2)	Stamford Bridge
		Report

23 October 1985	Charlton Athletic (2)	1–3	Chelsea (1)	Selhurst Park
		Report

==== Group 2 ====
Pos	Team	Pld	W	D	L	GF	GA	GD	Pts	Qualification
1	Oxford United	2	2	0	0	5	0	+5	6	Advance to Semi-finals
2	Fulham	2	0	1	1	0	2	−2	1	
3	Shrewsbury Town	2	0	1	1	0	3	−3	1	

Source: FCHD

18 September 1985	Oxford United (1)	3–0	Shrewsbury Town (2)	Manor Ground
		Report

15 October 1985	Shrewsbury Town (2)	0–0	Fulham (2)	Gay Meadow
		Report

22 October 1985	Fulham (2)	0–2	Oxford United (1)	Craven Cottage
		Report

==== Group 3 ====
Pos	Team	Pld	W	D	L	GF	GA	GD	Pts	Qualification
1	Stoke City	2	1	1	0	5	2	+3	4	Advance to Semi-finals
2	Millwall	2	0	2	0	3	3	0	2	
3	Coventry City	2	0	1	1	1	4	−3	1	

Source: FCHD

18 September 1985	Stoke City (2)	3–0	Coventry City (1)	Victoria Ground
		Report

2 October 1985	Millwall (2)	2–2	Stoke City (2)	The Old Den
	Fashanu; Lovell	Report	Bertschin pen.' Maskery

15 October 1985	Coventry City (1)	1–1	Millwall (2)	Highfield Road
		Report

==== Group 4 ====
Pos	Team	Pld	W	D	L	GF	GA	GD	Pts	Qualification
1	West Bromwich Albion	2	2	0	0	4	2	+2	6	Advance to Semi-finals
2	Brighton & Hove Albion	2	1	0	1	4	3	+1	3	
3	Crystal Palace	2	0	0	2	2	5	−3	0	

Source: FCHD

2 October 1985	Brighton & Hove Albion (2)	1–2	West Bromwich Albion (1)	Goldstone Ground
		Report

16 October 1985	Crystal Palace (2)	1–3	Brighton & Hove Albion (2)	Selhurst Park
		Report

23 October 1985	West Bromwich Albion (1)	2–1	Crystal Palace (2)	The Hawthorns
		Report

=== Semi-finals ===
6 November 1985	Stoke City (2)	0–1	Oxford United (1)	Victoria Ground
		Report

13 November 1985	West Bromwich Albion (1)	2–2 (a.e.t.) (4–5 p)	Chelsea (1)	The Hawthorns
		Report

=== Final ===
==== First leg ====
4 December 1985	Oxford United (1)	1–4	Chelsea (1)	Manor Ground
		Report

==== Second leg ====
17 December 1985	Chelsea (1)	0–1	Oxford United (1)	Stamford Bridge
		Report

Chelsea won 4–2 on aggregate.

== Northern section ==
=== First round ===
==== Group 1 ====
Pos	Team	Pld	W	D	L	GF	GA	GD	Pts	Qualification
1	Manchester City	2	2	0	0	8	2	+6	6	Advance to Semi-finals
2	Sheffield United	2	0	1	1	2	3	−1	1	
3	Leeds United	2	0	1	1	2	7	−5	1	

Source: FCHD

14 October 1985	Manchester City (1)	6–1	Leeds United (2)	Maine Road
		Report

16 October 1985	Leeds United (2)	1–1	Sheffield United (2)	Elland Road
		Report

22 October 1985	Sheffield United (2)	1–2	Manchester City (1)	Bramall Lane
		Report

==== Group 2 ====
Pos	Team	Pld	W	D	L	GF	GA	GD	Pts	Qualification
1	Middlesbrough	1	1	0	0	2	0	+2	3	Advance to Semi-finals
2	Carlisle United	1	0	0	1	0	2	−2	0	

Source: FCHD

8 October 1985	Middlesbrough (2)	2–0	Carlisle United (2)	Ayresome Park
		Report

==== Group 3 ====
Pos	Team	Pld	W	D	L	GF	GA	GD	Pts	Qualification
1	Sunderland	2	1	0	1	4	4	0	3	Advance to Semi-finals
2	Grimsby Town	2	1	0	1	4	4	0	3	

Source: FCHD

17 September 1985	Grimsby Town (2)	3–2	Sunderland (2)	Blundell Park
		Report

1 October 1985	Sunderland (2)	2–1 (a.e.t.) (3–2 p)	Grimsby Town (2)	Roker Park
		Report

Sunderland qualified on penalties after both teams tied on aggregate and points.

==== Group 4 ====
Pos	Team	Pld	W	D	L	GF	GA	GD	Pts	Qualification
1	Hull City	1	1	0	0	4	1	+3	3	Advance to Semi-finals
2	Bradford City	1	0	0	1	1	4	−3	0	

Source: FCHD

23 October 1985	Hull City (2)	4–1	Bradford City (2)	Boothferry Park
		Report

=== Semi-finals ===
4 November 1985	Manchester City (1)	0–0 (a.e.t.) (4–2 p)	Sunderland (2)	Maine Road
		Report

5 November 1985	Hull City (2)	3–1	Middlesbrough (2)	Boothferry Park
		Report

=== Final ===
==== First leg ====
26 November 1985	Hull City (2)	2–1	Manchester City (1)	Boothferry Park
		Report

==== Second leg ====
11 December 1985	Manchester City (1)	2–0	Hull City (2)	Maine Road
		Report

Manchester City won 3–2 on aggregate.

== Final ==
23 March 1986
15:00 BST

Chelsea	5–4	Manchester City
Speedie 23', 51', 58'; Lee 36', 79'		Kinsey 9'; Lillis 85', 89' (pen.); Rougvie 88' (o.g.)

Wembley Stadium, London
Attendance: 67,236
Referee: Alan Saunders (Newcastle)
