= 1997–98 Chelsea F.C. season =

English football club season

Chelsea F.C.
1997–98 season
- Chairman: Ken Bates
- Manager: Ruud Gullit (until 12 February); Gianluca Vialli (from 12 February)
- FA Premier League: 4th
- FA Cup: Third round
- League Cup: Winners
- FA Charity Shield: Runners-up
- UEFA Cup Winners' Cup: Winners
- Top goalscorer: League: Gianluca Vialli; Tore André Flo (11 each); All: Gianluca Vialli (19 goals)
- Highest home attendance: 34,845 (vs. Bolton Wanderers, 10 May)
- Lowest home attendance: 29,075 (vs. Blackpool, 19 Apr)
- Average home league attendance: 32,901
Home colours	Away colours

The 1997–98 season was Chelsea F.C.'s 84th competitive season, their 9th consecutive season in the English top flight and 92nd year as a club.

== Season summary ==
With conceding goals being a major issue last season, Chelsea signed Dutch international goalkeeper Ed de Goey, who proved to be a relative success. Chelsea's only other major signings were young Norwegian striker Tore Andre Flo and Uruguayan international midfielder Gustavo Poyet from Real Zaragoza, who added more goals from an otherwise very defensive midfield. Chelsea were well on course for a top-five finish and success in the UEFA Cup Winners' Cup and the League Cup when manager Ruud Gullit was sacked on 12 February following a dispute with chairman Ken Bates. His job went to 33-year-old striker Gianluca Vialli, who took on the role of player-manager and achieved instant success - within three months of his appointment, Vialli had guided the Blues to glory on the continent and at Wembley. This success gave Chelsea fans hope that the following season could spell the end of their title wait which began in 1955.

== Final league table ==
Pos	Team	Pld	W	D	L	GF	GA	GD	Pts	Qualification or relegation
2	Manchester United	38	23	8	7	73	26	+47	77	Qualification for the Champions League second qualifying round
3	Liverpool	38	18	11	9	68	42	+26	65	Qualification for the UEFA Cup first round
4	Chelsea	38	20	3	15	71	43	+28	63	Qualification for the Cup Winners' Cup first round (Note: Chelsea qualified for the Cup Winners' Cup as defending champions. As they were also the League Cup winners, the UEFA Cup berth vacated was awarded to Blackburn Rovers.)
5	Leeds United	38	17	8	13	57	46	+11	59	Qualification for the UEFA Cup first round (Note: Aston Villa was rewarded entry to the UEFA Cup through UEFA Fair Play ranking.)
6	Blackburn Rovers	38	16	10	12	57	52	+5	58	Qualification for the UEFA Cup first round

Source: Premier League
Rules for classification: 1) points; 2) goal difference; 3) number of goals scored.
Notes:

Results summary

Overall								Home						Away					
Pld	W	D	L	GF	GA	GD	Pts	W	D	L	GF	GA	GD	W	D	L	GF	GA	GD
38	20	3	15	71	43	+28	63	13	2	4	37	14	+23	7	1	11	34	29	+5

Source: 1997-98 FA Premier League table

Results by round

Round	1	2	3	4	5	6	7	8	9	10	11	12	13	14	15	16	17	18	19	20	21	22	23	24	25	26	27	28	29	30	31	32	33	34	35	36	37	38
Ground	A	A	A	H	A	H	A	H	A	H	A	A	H	A	H	H	A	H	A	H	A	H	A	H	A	A	H	H	H	A	A	A	H	H	H	H	A	H
Result	L	W	W	W	W	L	D	W	L	W	L	W	W	L	W	W	W	D	W	D	L	W	L	W	L	L	L	L	W	L	W	L	W	W	W	L	L	W
Position	14	11	6	4	3	5	5	4	5	4	4	4	4	4	3	2	2	3	3	3	3	2	3	2	2	4	5	5	4	4	4	5	4	4	3	3	4	4

Source: 11v11.com: 1997-98 Chelsea results
A = Away; H = Home; W = Win; D = Draw; L = Loss

== Results ==
=== FA Premier League ===
9 August 1997 1	Coventry City	3–2	Chelsea	Coventry, West Midlands
	Dublin 41', 42', 88'		Sinclair 39'; Flo 71'	Stadium: Highfield Road

24 August 1997 2	Barnsley	0–6	Chelsea	Barnsley, South Yorkshire
			Petrescu 25'; Poyet 38'; Vialli 44', 57', 65', 82'	Stadium: Oakwell

27 August 1997 3	Wimbledon	0–2	Chelsea	Croydon, London
			Di Matteo 60'; Petrescu 64'	Stadium: Selhurst Park

30 August 1997 4	Chelsea	4–2	Southampton	Fulham, London
	Petrescu 7'; Leboeuf 28'; Hughes 31'; Wise 34'		Davies 25'; Monkou 59'	Stadium: Stamford Bridge

13 September 1997 5	Crystal Palace	0–3	Chelsea	Croydon, London
			Hughes 20'; Leboeuf 26' (pen.); Le Saux 90'	Stadium: Selhurst Park

21 September 1997 6	Chelsea	2–3	Arsenal	Fulham, London
	Poyet 40'; Zola 60'		Bergkamp 45', 59'; Winterburn 89'	Stadium: Stamford Bridge

24 September 1997 7	Manchester United	2–2	Chelsea	Trafford, Greater Manchester
	Scholes 36'; Solskjær 86'		Berg 25' (o.g.); Hughes 68'	Stadium: Old Trafford

27 September 1997 8	Chelsea	1–0	Newcastle United	Fulham, London
	Poyet 75'			Stadium: Stamford Bridge

5 October 1997 9	Liverpool	4–2	Chelsea	Liverpool, Merseyside
	Berger 20', 35', 57'; Fowler 64'		Zola 22'; Poyet 85' (pen.)	Stadium: Anfield

18 October 1997 10	Chelsea	1–0	Leicester City	Fulham, London
	Leboeuf 88'			Stadium: Stamford Bridge

26 October 1997 11	Bolton Wanderers	1–0	Chelsea	Bolton, Greater Manchester
	Holdsworth 72'			Stadium: Reebok Stadium

1 November 1997 12	Aston Villa	0–2	Chelsea	Birmingham, West Midlands
			Hughes 38'; Flo 82'	Stadium: Villa Park

9 November 1997 13	Chelsea	2–1	West Ham United	Fulham, London
	Ferdinand 57' (o.g.); Zola 83'		Hartson 85' (pen.)	Stadium: Stamford Bridge

22 November 1997 14	Blackburn Rovers	1–0	Chelsea	Blackburn, Lancashire
	Croft 11'			Stadium: Ewood Park

26 November 1997 15	Chelsea	2–0	Everton	Fulham, London
	Wise 80' (pen.); Zola 90' (pen.)			Stadium: Stamford Bridge

29 November 1997 16	Chelsea	4–0	Derby County	Fulham, London
	Zola 12', 66', 77'; Hughes 35'			Stadium: Stamford Bridge

6 December 1997 17	Tottenham Hotspur	1–6	Chelsea	Haringey, London
	Vega 43'		Flo 40', 63', 90'; Di Matteo 48'; Petrescu 59'; Nicholls 78'	Stadium: White Hart Lane

13 December 1997 18	Chelsea	0–0	Leeds United	Fulham, London
				Stadium: Stamford Bridge

20 December 1997 19	Sheffield Wednesday	1–4	Chelsea	Sheffield, South Yorkshire
	Pembridge 71'		Petrescu 30'; Vialli 56'; Leboeuf 65' (pen.); Flo 84'	Stadium: Hillsborough

26 December 1997 20	Chelsea	1–1	Wimbledon	Fulham, London
	Vialli 8'		Mi. Hughes 28'	Stadium: Stamford Bridge

29 December 1997 21	Southampton	1–0	Chelsea	Southampton, Hampshire
	Davies 16'			Stadium: The Dell

10 January 1998 22	Chelsea	3–1	Coventry City	Fulham, London
	Nicholls 65', 70'; Di Matteo 78'		Telfer 30'	Stadium: Stamford Bridge

18 January 1998 23	Everton	3–1	Chelsea	Liverpool, Merseyside
	Speed 39'; Ferguson 62'; Duberry 83' (o.g.)	Report	Flo 37'	Stadium: Goodison Park

31 January 1998 24	Chelsea	2–0	Barnsley	Fulham, London
	Vialli 23'; Hughes 47'	Report		Stadium: Stamford Bridge

8 February 1998 25	Arsenal	2–0	Chelsea	Islington, London
	S. Hughes 4', 42'			Stadium: Highbury

21 February 1998 26	Leicester City	2–0	Chelsea	Leicester, Leicestershire
	Heskey 3', 89'			Stadium: Filbert Street

28 February 1998 27	Chelsea	0–1	Manchester United	Fulham, London
			P . Neville 31'	Stadium: Stamford Bridge

8 March 1998 28	Chelsea	0–1	Aston Villa	Fulham, London
			Joachim 51'	Stadium: Stamford Bridge

11 March 1998 29	Chelsea	6–2	Crystal Palace	Fulham, London
	Vialli 15', 44'; Zola 17'; Wise 84'; Flo 89', 90'		Hreiðarsson 7'; Bent 87'	Stadium: Stamford Bridge

14 March 1998 30	West Ham United	2–1	Chelsea	Newham, London
	T. Sinclair 69'; Unsworth 74'		Charvet 54'	Stadium: Boleyn Ground

5 April 1998 31	Derby County	0–1	Chelsea	Derby, Derbyshire
			Hughes 37'	Stadium: Pride Park Stadium

8 April 1998 32	Leeds United	3–1	Chelsea	Leeds, West Yorkshire
	Hasselbaink 7', 47'; Wetherall 22'		Charvet 11'	Stadium: Elland Road

11 April 1998 33	Chelsea	2–0	Tottenham Hotspur	Fulham, London
	Flo 75'; Vialli 88'			Stadium: Stamford Bridge

19 April 1998 34	Chelsea	1–0	Sheffield Wednesday	Fulham, London
	Leboeuf 23' (pen.)			Stadium: Stamford Bridge

25 April 1998 35	Chelsea	4–1	Liverpool	Fulham, London
	Hughes 11', 78'; Clarke 67'; Flo 72'		Riedle 45'	Stadium: Stamford Bridge

29 April 1998 36	Chelsea	0–1	Blackburn Rovers	Fulham, London
			Gallacher 48'	Stadium: Stamford Bridge

2 May 1998 37	Newcastle United	3–1	Chelsea	Newcastle-upon-Tyne, Tyneside
	Dabizas 39'; Lee 42'; Speed 59'		Di Matteo 77'	Stadium: St. James' Park

10 May 1998 38	Chelsea	2–0	Bolton Wanderers	Fulham, London
	Vialli 73'; Morris 90'			Stadium: Stamford Bridge

=== FA Cup ===
Date	Round	Opponent	Venue	Result	Attendance	Scorers
4 January 1998	3	Manchester United	H	3–5	34,792	Le Saux, Vialli (2)

=== League Cup ===
Date	Round	Opponent	Venue	Result	Attendance	Scorers
15 October 1997	3	Blackburn Rovers	H	1–1	18,671	Di Matteo
After extra time, Chelsea won on 4–1 on penalties
19 November 1997	4	Southampton	H	2–1	20,968	Morris, Flo
7 January 1998	QF	Ipswich Town	A	2–2	22,088	Le Saux, Flo
After extra time, Chelsea won on 4–1 on penalties
28 January 1998	SF	Arsenal	A	1–2	38,144	Hughes
18 February 1998	SF	Arsenal	H	3–1	34,330	Petrescu, Di Matteo, Hughes
29 March 1998	F	Middlesbrough	N	2–0	77,698	Sinclair, Di Matteo

=== UEFA Cup Winners' Cup ===
Date	Round	Opponent	Venue	Result	Attendance	Scorers
8 September 1997	1	(Slovakia) Slovan Bratislava	H	2–0	23,067	Danny Granville, Di Matteo
2 October 1997	1	(Slovakia) Slovan Bratislava	A	2–0	13,850	Di Matteo, Vialli
23 October 1997	2	(Norway) Tromsø	A	2–3	6,438	Vialli (2)
6 November 1997	2	(Norway) Tromsø	H	7–1	29,363	Leboeuf, Petrescu (2), Vialli (3), Zola
5 March 1998	QF	(Spain) Real Betis	A	2–1	31,000	Flo (2)
19 March 1998	QF	(Spain) Real Betis	H	3–1	32,300	Sinclair, Di Matteo, Zola
2 April 1998	SF	(Italy) Vicenza	A	0–1	19,319	
16 April 1998	SF	(Italy) Vicenza	H	3–1	33,810	Poyet, Zola, Hughes
13 May 1998	F	(Germany) VfB Stuttgart	N	1–0	30,216	Zola

== First team squad ==
Squad at end of season

Note: Flags indicate national team as defined under FIFA eligibility rules; some limited exceptions apply. Players may hold more than one non-FIFA nationality.

No.	Pos.	Nation	Player
1	GK	NED	Ed de Goey
2	DF	ROU	Dan Petrescu
3	DF	NGA	Celestine Babayaro
5	DF	FRA	Frank Leboeuf
6	DF	SCO	Steve Clarke
7	DF	FRA	Bernard Lambourde
8	MF	URU	Gus Poyet
9	FW	ITA	Gianluca Vialli
10	FW	WAL	Mark Hughes
11	MF	ENG	Dennis Wise (captain)
12	DF	ENG	Michael Duberry
13	GK	ENG	Kevin Hitchcock
14	DF	ENG	Graeme Le Saux
15	DF	ENG	David Lee
16	MF	ITA	Roberto Di Matteo
17	DF	ENG	Danny Granville

No.	Pos.	Nation	Player
18	DF	ENG	Andy Myers
19	FW	NOR	Tore André Flo
20	DF	JAM	Frank Sinclair (Note: Sinclair was born in Lambeth, England, but also qualified to represent Jamaica internationally.)
21	MF	ENG	Paul Hughes
22	FW	ENG	Mark Nicholls
23	GK	RUS	Dmitri Kharine
24	MF	ENG	Eddie Newton
25	FW	ITA	Gianfranco Zola
26	DF	FRA	Laurent Charvet (on loan from Cannes)
28	MF	ENG	Jody Morris
29	DF	ENG	Neil Clement
31	GK	IRL	Nick Colgan
32	MF	SCO	Steven Hampshire
33	FW	ENG	Joe Sheerin
34	MF	ENG	Nick Crittenden
35	DF	ENG	Jon Harley

=== Left club during season ===
Note: Flags indicate national team as defined under FIFA eligibility rules; some limited exceptions apply. Players may hold more than one non-FIFA nationality.

No.	Pos.	Nation	Player
30	GK	NOR	Frode Grodås (to Tottenham Hotspur)
4	MF	NED	Ruud Gullit (retired)

No.	Pos.	Nation	Player
—	MF	ENG	David Rocastle (on loan to Hull City)

=== Reserve squad ===
Note: Flags indicate national team as defined under FIFA eligibility rules; some limited exceptions apply. Players may hold more than one non-FIFA nationality.

No.	Pos.	Nation	Player
—	DF	ENG	Stephen Broad
—	DF	ENG	John Terry

No.	Pos.	Nation	Player
—	FW	RSA	Mark Stein

== Statistics ==
No.	Pos	Nat	Player	Total		FA Premier League		FA Cup		League Cup		UEFA Cup Winners' Cup	
No.	Pos	Nat	Player	Apps	Goals	Apps	Goals	Apps	Goals	Apps	Goals	Apps	Goals
1	GK	(Netherlands) NED	Ed de Goey	42	0	28	0	1	0	4	0	9	0
2	DF	(Romania) ROU	Dan Petrescu	42	8	31	5	1	0	3	1	7	2
3	DF	(Nigeria) NGA	Celestine Babayaro	13	0	8	0	0	0	1+1	0	3	0
4	MF	(Netherlands) NED	Ruud Gullit	10	0	0+6	0	0	0	3+1	0	0	0
5	DF	(France) FRA	Frank Leboeuf	46	6	32	5	1	0	4	0	9	1
6	DF	(Scotland) SCO	Steve Clarke	40	1	22+4	1	1	0	4+2	0	7	0
7	DF	(France) FRA	Bernard Lambourde	13	0	5+2	0	0	0	3	0	3	0
8	MF	(Uruguay) URU	Gus Poyet	18	5	11+3	4	0	0	0	0	4	1
9	FW	(Italy) ITA	Gianluca Vialli	33	19	14+7	11	0+1	2	2+1	0	8	6
10	FW	(Wales) WAL	Mark Hughes	39	12	25+4	9	1	0	3+3	2	3	1
11	MF	(England) ENG	Dennis Wise	39	3	26	3	0	0	4	0	9	0
12	DF	(England) ENG	Michael Duberry	33	0	23	0	1	0	3	0	6	0
13	GK	(England) ENG	Kevin Hitchcock	2	0	0	0	0	0	2	0	0	0
14	DF	(England) ENG	Graeme Le Saux	34	3	26	1	1	1	4	1	3	0
15	DF	(England) ENG	David Lee	3	0	1	0	0	0	0+2	0	0	0
16	MF	(Italy) ITA	Roberto Di Matteo	43	10	28+2	4	1	0	4	3	8	3
17	DF	(England) ENG	Danny Granville	20	1	9+4	0	0	0	3	0	4	1
18	DF	(England) ENG	Andy Myers	17	0	11+1	0	0+1	0	1	0	3	0
19	FW	(Norway) NOR	Tore André Flo	44	15	16+18	11	1	0	3+1	2	5	2
20	DF	(Jamaica) JAM	Frank Sinclair	32	2	20+2	1	0	0	4+1	1	5	0
21	MF	(England) ENG	Paul Hughes	11	0	5+4	0	0	0	1	0	1	0
22	FW	(England) ENG	Mark Nicholls	24	3	8+11	3	1	0	2	0	2	0
23	GK	(Russia) RUS	Dmitri Kharine	10	0	10	0	0	0	0	0	0	0
24	MF	(England) ENG	Eddie Newton	29	0	17+1	0	0	0	3+1	0	7	0
25	FW	(Italy) ITA	Gianfranco Zola	40	12	23+4	8	1	0	4	0	8	4
26	DF	(France) FRA	Laurent Charvet	13	2	7+4	2	0	0	1	0	1	0
28	MF	(England) ENG	Jody Morris	14	2	9+2	1	0	0	1	1	2	0
32	FW	(Scotland) SCO	Steven Hampshire	1	0	0	0	0	0	1	0	0	0
34	MF	(England) ENG	Nick Crittenden	3	0	0+2	0	0	0	1	0	0	0
35	DF	(England) ENG	Jon Harley	3	0	3	0	0	0	0	0	0	0

Statistics taken from. Squad details and shirt numbers from and .

== Transfers ==
=== In ===
- Laurent Charvet - Cannes, loan
- Ed de Goey - Feyenoord, £2,250,000, June 1997
- Gus Poyet - Real Zaragoza, free, June 1997
- Tore André Flo - Brann, £300,000, 1997
- Celestine Babayaro - Anderlecht, £2,250,000, 1997
- Bernard Lambourde - Bordeaux, 1997
- Graeme Le Saux - Blackburn Rovers, £5,000,000, August 1997

=== Out ===
- David Rocastle - Sabah, released, May 1998
