= 1998–99 Chelsea F.C. season =

English football club season

Chelsea
1998–99 season
- Chairman: Ken Bates
- Manager: Gianluca Vialli
- FA Premier League: 3rd
- FA Cup: Quarter-finals
- League Cup: Quarter-finals
- UEFA Super Cup: Winners
- UEFA Cup Winners' Cup: Semi-finals
- Top goalscorer: League: Gianfranco Zola (13); All: Gianfranco Zola (15)
- Highest home attendance: 35,016 (vs. Derby County, 16 May 1999)
- Lowest home attendance: 17,714 (vs. Helsingborgs IF, 17 September 1998)
- Average home league attendance: 34,754
| Home colours | Away colours | Third colours |

The 1998–99 season was Chelsea F.C.'s 85th competitive season, seventh consecutive season in the Premier League and 93rd year as a club.

== Season summary ==
After a solid fourth-place finish coupled with European and League Cup success the previous season, Chelsea really felt that they could challenge for the title this season. Chelsea made more big name signings, including French World Cup winning defender Marcel Desailly from A.C. Milan, Spanish international full-back Albert Ferrer from Barcelona and, in a club-record £5.4 million move, Italian international striker Pierluigi Casiraghi from Lazio. Casiraghi's season and career was cut short by a knee injury, but his compatriot Gianfranco Zola had arguably the best season of his career, leading Chelsea to a serious title challenge, scoring 15 goals in all competitions and setting up many other goals for his teammates.

Ultimately, the European Super Cup, won by beating Champions League winners Real Madrid, was the only trophy that Chelsea had to show for them. Their defence of the now-defunct Cup Winners' Cup ended in the semi-finals, while their title challenge was ended in early May when they couldn't get the better of Manchester United or Arsenal. Nonetheless, a final third-place finish booked them their first ever UEFA Champions League campaign and was another triumph for their young manager Gianluca Vialli, who, at 35, announced his retirement as a player to concentrate on his managerial duties.

== Final league table ==
| Pos | Team | Pld | W | D | L | GF | GA | GD | Pts | Qualification or relegation |
|---|---|---|---|---|---|---|---|---|---|---|
| 1 | Manchester United (C) | 38 | 22 | 13 | 3 | 80 | 37 | +43 | 79 | Qualification for the Champions League first group stage |
| 2 | Arsenal | 38 | 22 | 12 | 4 | 59 | 17 | +42 | 78 | Qualification for the Champions League first group stage |
| 3 | Chelsea | 38 | 20 | 15 | 3 | 57 | 30 | +27 | 75 | Qualification for the Champions League third qualifying round |
| 4 | Leeds United | 38 | 18 | 13 | 7 | 62 | 34 | +28 | 67 | Qualification for the UEFA Cup first round |
| 5 | West Ham United | 38 | 16 | 9 | 13 | 46 | 53 | −7 | 57 | Qualification for the Intertoto Cup third round |

Source: Premier League
Rules for classification: 1) points; 2) goal difference; 3) number of goals scored.
(C) Champions

Results summary

| Overall | | | | | | | | Home | | | | | | Away | | | | | |
| Pld | W | D | L | GF | GA | GD | Pts | W | D | L | GF | GA | GD | W | D | L | GF | GA | GD |
|---|---|---|---|---|---|---|---|---|---|---|---|---|---|---|---|---|---|---|---|
| 38 | 20 | 15 | 3 | 57 | 30 | +27 | 75 | 12 | 6 | 1 | 29 | 13 | +16 | 8 | 9 | 2 | 28 | 17 | +11 |

Source: 1998-99 FA Premier League table

Results by round

| Round | 1 | 2 | 3 | 4 | 5 | 6 | 7 | 8 | 9 | 10 | 11 | 12 | 13 | 14 | 15 | 16 | 17 | 18 | 19 | 20 | 21 | 22 | 23 | 24 | 25 | 26 | 27 | 28 | 29 | 30 | 31 | 32 | 33 | 34 | 35 | 36 | 37 | 38 |
|---|---|---|---|---|---|---|---|---|---|---|---|---|---|---|---|---|---|---|---|---|---|---|---|---|---|---|---|---|---|---|---|---|---|---|---|---|---|---|
| Ground | A | H | H | H | A | H | A | H | A | A | H | A | H | A | H | A | A | H | A | H | A | H | A | H | H | A | H | H | A | A | A | A | H | A | H | H | A | H |
| Result | L | D | D | W | W | W | D | W | D | D | W | W | D | D | W | D | D | W | W | D | W | W | L | W | D | W | W | L | W | W | W | D | D | D | W | W | D | W |
| Position | 18 | 17 | 18 | 15 | 11 | 7 | 6 | 4 | 6 | 5 | 4 | 4 | 4 | 6 | 3 | 3 | 3 | 1 | 1 | 2 | 1 | 1 | 2 | 2 | 2 | 2 | 2 | 3 | 3 | 3 | 3 | 3 | 2 | 3 | 3 | 3 | 3 | 3 |

Source: 11v11.com: 1998-99 Chelsea results
A = Away; H = Home; W = Win; D = Draw; L = Loss

== Squad ==
Note: Flags indicate national team as defined under FIFA eligibility rules; some limited exceptions apply. Players may hold more than one non-FIFA nationality.

| No. | Pos. | Nation | Player |
|---|---|---|---|
| 1 | GK | NED | Ed de Goey |
| 2 | DF | ROU | Dan Petrescu |
| 3 | DF | NGR | Celestine Babayaro |
| 5 | DF | FRA | Frank Leboeuf |
| 6 | DF | FRA | Marcel Desailly |
| 7 | MF | DEN | Bjarne Goldbæk |
| 8 | MF | URU | Gustavo Poyet |
| 9 | FW | ITA | Gianluca Vialli |
| 10 | FW | ITA | Pierluigi Casiraghi |
| 11 | MF | ENG | Dennis Wise (captain) |
| 12 | DF | ENG | Michael Duberry |
| 13 | GK | ENG | Kevin Hitchcock |
| 14 | DF | ENG | Graeme Le Saux |
| 15 | MF | ITA | Samuele Dalla Bona |
| 16 | MF | ITA | Roberto Di Matteo |
| 17 | DF | ESP | Albert Ferrer |

| No. | Pos. | Nation | Player |
|---|---|---|---|
| 18 | DF | ENG | Andy Myers |
| 19 | FW | NOR | Tore André Flo |
| 20 | DF | WAL | Danny Slatter |
| 21 | DF | FRA | Bernard Lambourde |
| 22 | FW | ENG | Mark Nicholls |
| 23 | GK | RUS | Dmitri Kharine |
| 24 | MF | ENG | Eddie Newton |
| 25 | FW | ITA | Gianfranco Zola |
| 26 | DF | ENG | John Terry |
| 27 | DF | ENG | Jon Harley |
| 28 | MF | ENG | Jody Morris |
| 29 | DF | ENG | Neil Clement |
| 30 | DF | ITA | Luca Percassi |
| 32 | FW | FIN | Mikael Forssell |
| 34 | MF | ENG | Nick Crittenden |

=== Left club during season ===
Note: Flags indicate national team as defined under FIFA eligibility rules; some limited exceptions apply. Players may hold more than one non-FIFA nationality.

| No. | Pos. | Nation | Player |
|---|---|---|---|
| 4 | DF | SCO | Steve Clarke (retired) |
| 7 | MF | DEN | Brian Laudrup (to Copenhagen) |

| No. | Pos. | Nation | Player |
|---|---|---|---|
| 15 | DF | ENG | David Lee (to Bristol Rovers) |
| 20 | DF | JAM | Frank Sinclair (to Leicester City) |

=== Reserve squad ===
Note: Flags indicate national team as defined under FIFA eligibility rules; some limited exceptions apply. Players may hold more than one non-FIFA nationality.

| No. | Pos. | Nation | Player |
|---|---|---|---|
| - | GK | ENG | Rhys Evans |
| - | DF | ENG | Darren Baxter |
| - | DF | ENG | Stephen Broad |
| - | MF | ITA | Samuele Dalla Bona |
| - | MF | ENG | Paul Hughes |
| - | MF | ENG | Courtney Pitt |

| No. | Pos. | Nation | Player |
|---|---|---|---|
| - | MF | ENG | Jay Richardson |
| - | FW | SCO | Steven Hampshire |
| - | FW | ENG | Sam Parkin |
| - | FW | ENG | Joe Sheerin |
| - | FW | ENG | Rob Wolleaston |

== Statistics ==
| No. | Pos | Nat | Player | Total | | FA Premier League | | Cup Winners Cup | | FA Cup | | Football League Cup | |
| No. | Pos | Nat | Player | Apps | Goals | Apps | Goals | Apps | Goals | Apps | Goals | Apps | Goals |
|---|---|---|---|---|---|---|---|---|---|---|---|---|---|
| 1 | GK | (Netherlands) NED | Ed de Goey | 48 | 0 | 35 | 0 | 7 | 0 | 6 | 0 | 0 | 0 |
| 2 | DF | (Romania) ROU | Dan Petrescu | 45 | 3 | 23+9 | 3 | 6 | 0 | 4 | 0 | 3 | 0 |
| 3 | DF | (Nigeria) NGR | Celestine Babayaro | 43 | 4 | 26+2 | 3 | 7 | 1 | 4+1 | 0 | 3 | 0 |
| 5 | DF | (France) FRA | Frank Leboeuf | 45 | 7 | 33 | 4 | 6 | 1 | 4 | 1 | 2 | 1 |
| 6 | DF | (France) FRA | Marcel Desailly | 44 | 1 | 30+1 | 0 | 7 | 1 | 6 | 0 | 0 | 0 |
| 7 | MF | (Denmark) DEN | Brian Laudrup | 10 | 1 | 5+2 | 0 | 3 | 1 | 0 | 0 | 0 | 0 |
| 7 | MF | (Denmark) DEN | Bjarne Goldbæk | 31 | 5 | 13+10 | 5 | 0 | 0 | 2+4 | 0 | 2 | 0 |
| 8 | MF | (Uruguay) URU | Gustavo Poyet | 37 | 13 | 21+7 | 11 | 6 | 0 | 0 | 0 | 3 | 2 |
| 9 | FW | (Italy) ITA | Gianluca Vialli | 20 | 10 | 9 | 1 | 5 | 1 | 3 | 2 | 3 | 6 |
| 10 | FW | (Italy) ITA | Pierluigi Casiraghi | 14 | 1 | 10 | 1 | 4 | 0 | 0 | 0 | 0 | 0 |
| 11 | MF | (England) ENG | Dennis Wise | 36 | 2 | 21+1 | 0 | 7 | 1 | 5 | 1 | 2 | 0 |
| 12 | DF | (England) ENG | Michael Duberry | 32 | 0 | 18+7 | 0 | 2 | 0 | 2 | 0 | 3 | 0 |
| 13 | GK | (England) ENG | Kevin Hitchcock | 3 | 0 | 2+1 | 0 | 0 | 0 | 0 | 0 | 0 | 0 |
| 14 | DF | (England) ENG | Graeme Le Saux | 45 | 0 | 30+1 | 0 | 8 | 0 | 6 | 0 | 0 | 0 |
| 15 | DF | (England) ENG | Andy Myers | 4 | 0 | 1 | 0 | 1 | 0 | 0+2 | 0 | 0 | 0 |
| 16 | MF | (Italy) ITA | Roberto Di Matteo | 45 | 3 | 26+4 | 2 | 7 | 0 | 4+2 | 1 | 1+1 | 0 |
| 17 | DF | (Spain) ESP | Albert Ferrer | 40 | 0 | 30 | 0 | 7 | 0 | 2 | 0 | 0+1 | 0 |
| 19 | FW | (Norway) NOR | Tore Andre Flo | 44 | 13 | 18+12 | 10 | 8 | 2 | 2+1 | 0 | 2+1 | 1 |
| 21 | DF | (France) FRA | Bernard Lambourde | 25 | 1 | 12+5 | 0 | 3 | 1 | 2 | 0 | 2+1 | 0 |
| 22 | FW | (England) ENG | Mark Nicholls | 16 | 0 | 0+9 | 0 | 2 | 0 | 0+3 | 0 | 2 | 0 |
| 23 | GK | (Russia) RUS | Dmitri Kharine | 5 | 0 | 1 | 0 | 1 | 0 | 0 | 0 | 3 | 0 |
| 24 | MF | (England) ENG | Eddie Newton | 9 | 0 | 1+6 | 0 | 1 | 0 | 0+1 | 0 | 0 | 0 |
| 25 | FW | (Italy) ITA | Gianfranco Zola | 48 | 15 | 35+2 | 13 | 5 | 1 | 6 | 1 | 0 | 0 |
| 26 | DF | (England) ENG | John Terry | 7 | 0 | 0+2 | 0 | 1 | 0 | 2+1 | 0 | 0+1 | 0 |
| 27 | DF | (England) ENG | Jon Harley | 1 | 0 | 0 | 0 | 0 | 0 | 0 | 0 | 0+1 | 0 |
| 28 | MF | (England) ENG | Jody Morris | 27 | 1 | 14+4 | 1 | 2 | 0 | 5 | 0 | 2 | 0 |
| 29 | DF | (England) ENG | Neil Clement | 2 | 0 | 0 | 0 | 0 | 0 | 0 | 0 | 0+2 | 0 |
| 30 | DF | (Italy) ITA | Luca Percassi | 1 | 0 | 0 | 0 | 0 | 0 | 0 | 0 | 0+1 | 0 |
| 32 | FW | (Finland) FIN | Mikael Forssell | 13 | 3 | 4+6 | 1 | 0 | 0 | 1+2 | 2 | 0 | 0 |

Statistics taken from. Squad details and shirt numbers from and .

== Results ==
=== Premier League ===
| 15 August 1998 1 | Coventry City | 2–1 | Chelsea | Coventry |
| | Huckerby 10'; Dublin 16' | | Poyet 37' | Stadium: Highfield Road |

| 22 August 1998 2 | Chelsea | 1–1 | Newcastle United | Fulham, London |
| | Babayaro 23' | | A. Andersson 43' | Stadium: Stamford Bridge |

| 9 September 1998 3 | Chelsea | 0–0 | Arsenal | Fulham, London |
| | | | | Stadium: Stamford Bridge |

| 12 September 1998 4 | Chelsea | 2–1 | Nottingham Forest | Fulham, London |
| | Zola 1'; Poyet 35' | | Darcheville 69' | Stadium: Stamford Bridge |

| 21 September 1998 5 | Blackburn Rovers | 3–4 | Chelsea | Blackburn, Lancashire |
| | Sutton 34', 79' (pen.); Pérez 57' (red card) 66' | Report | Zola 15'; Leboeuf 51' (pen.); Le Saux (red card) 66'; Flo 82', 86' | Stadium: Ewood Park; Referee: Peter Jones |

| 26 September 1998 6 | Chelsea | 2–0 | Middlesbrough | Fulham, London |
| | Pallister 46' (o.g.); Zola 81' | Report | | Stadium: Stamford Bridge; Referee: Mike Reed |

| 4 October 1998 7 | Liverpool | 1–1 | Chelsea | Liverpool, Merseyside |
| | Redknapp 83' | | Casiraghi 10' | Stadium: Anfield |

| 17 October 1998 8 | Chelsea | 2–1 | Charlton Athletic | Fulham, London |
| | Leboeuf 18' (pen.); Poyet 88' | | Youds 58' | Stadium: Stamford Bridge |

| 25 October 1998 9 | Leeds United | 0–0 | Chelsea | Leeds, West Yorkshire |
| | | | | Stadium: Elland Road |

| 8 November 1998 10 | West Ham United | 1–1 | Chelsea | Newham, London |
| | Ruddock 4' | | Babayaro 76' | Stadium: Boleyn Ground |

| 14 November 1998 11 | Chelsea | 3–0 | Wimbledon | Fulham, London |
| | Zola 32'; Poyet 55'; Petrescu 70' | | | Stadium: Stamford Bridge |

| 21 November 1998 12 | Leicester City | 2–4 | Chelsea | Leicester, Leicestershire |
| | Izzet 40'; Guppy 60' | | Zola 28', 90'; Poyet 39'; Flo 56' | Stadium: Filbert Street |

| 28 November 1998 13 | Chelsea | 1–1 | Sheffield Wednesday | Fulham, London |
| | Zola 27' | | Booth 67' | Stadium: Stamford Bridge |

| 5 December 1998 14 | Everton | 0–0 | Chelsea | Liverpool, Merseyside |
| | | | | Stadium: Goodison Park |

| 9 December 1998 15 | Chelsea | 2–1 | Aston Villa | Fulham, London |
| | Zola 30'; Flo 90' | | Hendrie 32' | Stadium: Stamford Bridge |

| 12 December 1998 16 | Derby County | 2–2 | Chelsea | Derby, Derbyshire |
| | Carbonari 26'; Sturridge 90' | | Flo 55'; Poyet 59' | Stadium: Pride Park Stadium |

| 16 December 1998 17 | Manchester United | 1–1 | Chelsea | Trafford, Greater Manchester |
| | A. Cole 45' | | Zola 83' | Stadium: Old Trafford |

| 19 December 1998 18 | Chelsea | 2–0 | Tottenham Hotspur | Fulham, London |
| | Poyet 80'; Flo 90' | | | Stadium: Stamford Bridge |

| 26 December 1998 19 | Southampton | 0–2 | Chelsea | Southampton, Hampshire |
| | | | Flo 20'; Poyet 48' | Stadium: The Dell |

| 29 December 1998 20 | Chelsea | 0–0 | Manchester United | Fulham, London |
| | | | | Stadium: Stamford Bridge |

| 9 January 1999 21 | Newcastle United | 0–1 | Chelsea | Newcastle-upon-Tyne |
| | | | Petrescu 39' | Stadium: St. James' Park |

| 16 January 1999 22 | Chelsea | 2–1 | Coventry City | Fulham, London |
| | Leboeuf 45'; Di Matteo 90' | | Huckerby 9' | Stadium: Stamford Bridge |

| 31 January 1999 23 | Arsenal | 1–0 | Chelsea | Islington, London |
| | Bergkamp 32' | | | Stadium: Highbury |

| 6 February 1999 24 | Chelsea | 1–0 | Southampton | Fulham, London |
| | Zola 11' | | | Stadium: Stamford Bridge |

| 17 February 1999 25 | Chelsea | 1–1 | Blackburn Rovers | Fulham, London |
| | Morris 44' | | Ward 84' | Stadium: Stamford Bridge |

| 20 February 1999 26 | Nottingham Forest | 1–3 | Chelsea | Nottingham |
| | van Hooijdonk 39' | | Forssell 6'; Goldbæk 25', 83' | Stadium: City Ground |

| 27 February 1999 27 | Chelsea | 2–1 | Liverpool | Fulham, London |
| | Leboeuf 7' (pen.); Goldbæk 38' | Report | Owen 77' | Stadium: Stamford Bridge; Referee: Paul Durkin |

| 13 March 1999 28 | Chelsea | 0–1 | West Ham United | Fulham, London |
| | | | Kitson 75' | Stadium: Stamford Bridge |

| 21 March 1999 29 | Aston Villa | 0–3 | Chelsea | Birmingham, West Midlands |
| | | | Flo 59', 89'; Goldbæk 86' | Stadium: Villa Park |

| 3 April 1999 30 | Charlton Athletic | 0–1 | Chelsea | Greenwich, London |
| | | | Di Matteo 11' | Stadium: The Valley |

| 11 April 1999 31 | Wimbledon | 1–2 | Chelsea | Croydon, London |
| | Gayle 90' | | Flo 24'; Poyet 53' | Stadium: Selhurst Park |

| 14 April 1999 32 | Middlesbrough | 0–0 | Chelsea | Middlesbrough, North Yorkshire |
| | | | | Stadium: Riverside Stadium |

| 18 April 1999 33 | Chelsea | 2–2 | Leicester City | Fulham, London |
| | Zola 30'; Elliott 69' (o.g.) | | Duberry 82' (o.g.); Guppy 88' | Stadium: Stamford Bridge |

| 25 April 1999 34 | Sheffield Wednesday | 0–0 | Chelsea | Sheffield |
| | | | | Stadium: Hillsborough |

| 1 May 1999 35 | Chelsea | 3–1 | Everton | Fulham, London |
| | Zola 25', 81'; Petrescu 60' | | Jeffers 69' | Stadium: Stamford Bridge |

| 5 May 1999 36 | Chelsea | 1–0 | Leeds United | Fulham, London |
| | Poyet 68' | | | Stadium: Stamford Bridge |

| 10 May 1999 37 | Tottenham Hotspur | 2–2 | Chelsea | Haringey, London |
| | Iversen 38'; Ginola 64' | | Poyet 4'; Goldbæk 73' | Stadium: White Hart Lane |

| 16 May 1999 38 | Chelsea | 2–1 | Derby County | Fulham, London |
| | Babayaro 40'; Vialli 68' | | Carbonari 88' | Stadium: Stamford Bridge |

==== Goalscorers ====
- (Italy) Gianfranco Zola 13
- (Uruguay) Gustavo Poyet 11
- (Norway) Tore Andre Flo 10
- (Denmark) Bjarne Goldbaek 5
- (France) Frank Leboeuf 4
- (Nigeria) Celestine Babayaro 3
- (Romania) Dan Petrescu 3
- (Italy) Roberto Di Matteo 2
- (Italy) Pierluigi Casiraghi 1
- (England) Jody Morris 1
- (Finland) Mikael Forssell 1
- (Italy) Gianluca Vialli 1

=== UEFA Super Cup ===
| Date | Opponent | Venue | Result | Attendance | Scorers |
|---|---|---|---|---|---|
| 28 August 1998 | (Spain) Real Madrid | N | 1–0 | 10,000 | Poyet |

==== Goalscorers ====
- (Uruguay) Gustavo Poyet 1

=== UEFA Cup Winners' Cup ===
| Date | Round | Opponent | Venue | Result | Attendance | Scorers |
|---|---|---|---|---|---|---|
| 17 September 1998 | R1 | (Sweden) Helsingborg | H | 1–0 | 17,714 | Leboeuf |
| 1 October 1998 | R1 | (Sweden) Helsingborg | A | 0–0 | 12,348 | |
| 22 October 1998 | R2 | (Denmark) Copenhagen | H | 1–1 | 21,207 | Desailly |
| 5 November 1998 | R2 | (Denmark) Copenhagen | A | 1–0 | 24,188 | Laudrup |
| 4 March 1999 | QF | (Norway) Vålerenga | H | 3–0 | 34,177 | Babayaro, Zola, Wise |
| 18 March 1999 | QF | (Norway) Vålerenga | A | 3–2 | 17,936 | Vialli, Lambourde, Flo |
| 8 April 1999 | SF | (Spain) Mallorca | H | 1–1 | 35,524 | Flo |
| 22 April 1999 | SF | (Spain) Mallorca | A | 0–1 | 18,848 | |

==== Goalscorers ====
- (Norway) Tore Andre Flo 2
- (France) Frank Leboeuf 1
- (France) Marcel Desailly 1
- (Denmark) Brian Laudrup 1
- (Nigeria) Celestine Babayaro 1
- (Italy) Gianfranco Zola 1
- (England) Dennis Wise 1
- (Italy) Gianluca Vialli 1
- (France) Bernard Lambourde 1

=== League Cup ===
| Date | Round | Opponent | Venue | Result | Attendance | Scorers |
|---|---|---|---|---|---|---|
| 28 October 1998 | R3 | Aston Villa | H | 4–1 | 26,790 | Vialli (3), Flo |
| 11 November 1998 | R4 | Arsenal | A | 5–0 | 37,562 | Leboeuf, Vialli (2), Poyet (2) |
| 1 December 1998 | QF | Wimbledon | A | 1–2 | 19,286 | Vialli |

==== Goalscorers ====
- (Italy) Gianluca Vialli 6
- (Uruguay) Gustavo Poyet 2
- (Norway) Tore Andre Flo 1
- (France) Frank Leboeuf 1

=== FA Cup ===
| Date | Round | Opponent | Venue | Result | Attendance | Scorers |
|---|---|---|---|---|---|---|
| 2 January 1999 | R3 | Oldham Athletic | A | 2–0 | 12,770 | Vialli (2) |
| 25 January 1999 | R4 | Oxford United | A | 1–1 | 9,059 | Leboeuf (pen.) |
| 3 February 1999 | R4 (R) | Oxford United | H | 4–2 | 32,106 | Wise, Zola, Forssell (2) |
| 13 February 1999 | R5 | Sheffield Wednesday | A | 1–0 | 29,410 | Di Matteo |
| 7 March 1999 | R6 | Manchester United | A | 0–0 | 54,587 | |
| 10 March 1999 | R6 (R) | Manchester United | H | 0–2 | 33,075 | |

==== Goalscorers ====
- (Italy) Gianluca Vialli 2
- (Finland) Mikael Forssell 2
- (France) Frank Leboeuf 1
- (England) Dennis Wise 1
- (Italy) Gianfranco Zola 1
- (Italy) Roberto Di Matteo 1
