= 1998 UEFA Cup Winners' Cup final =

- Match programme cover
- Event: 1997–98 UEFA Cup Winners' Cup
Chelsea	VfB Stuttgart
(England)	(Germany)
1	0
- Date: 13 May 1998
- Venue: Råsunda Stadium, Stockholm
- Man of the Match: Gianfranco Zola (Chelsea)
- Referee: Stefano Braschi (Italy)
- Attendance: 30,216

The 1998 UEFA Cup Winners' Cup final was a football match that took place on 13 May 1998 at Råsunda Stadium in Stockholm, Sweden to determine the winner of the 1997–98 UEFA Cup Winners' Cup. It was contested by Chelsea of England and VfB Stuttgart of Germany and was the 38th final of what was Europe's second largest football competition at the time.

Both clubs played a total of eight games in four stages to advance to the final. Chelsea had the upper hand in all but two of their encounters, defeating Tromsø IL with an accumulative score of 9–4 in a two-legged match and edging Vicenza by one goal. Stuttgart also enjoyed an advantage in all but two of their meetings, beating ÍBV 5–2 on aggregate and winning over Slavia Prague and Lokomotiv Moscow by two goals.

A crowd of 30,216 were in attendance to witness Chelsea win the match 1–0, with Gianfranco Zola scoring the winning goal in the second half, seconds after coming on as a substitute. As a result, the English club claimed a cup double, having previously won the League Cup earlier in the campaign. It was Chelsea's second conquest of the Cup Winners' Cup, adding to their 1971 victory. By winning the tournament, they also gained qualification for the 1998 UEFA Super Cup, which they eventually won.

== Route to the final ==
(England) Chelsea				Round	(Germany) VfB Stuttgart			
Opponent	Agg.	1st leg	2nd leg	Stages	Opponent	Agg.	1st leg	2nd leg
(Slovakia) Slovan Bratislava	4–0	2–0 (H)	2–0 (A)	First round	(Iceland) ÍBV	5–2	3–1 (A)	2–1 (H)
(Norway) Tromsø	9–4	2–3 (A)	7–1 (H)	Second round	(Belgium) Germinal Ekeren	6–4	4–0 (A)	2–4 (H)
(Spain) Real Betis	5–2	2–1 (A)	3–1 (H)	Quarter-finals	(Czech Republic) Slavia Prague	3–1	1–1 (A)	2–0 (H)
(Italy) Vicenza	3–2	0–1 (A)	3–1 (H)	Semi-finals	(Russia) Lokomotiv Moscow	3–1	2–1 (H)	1–0 (A)

=== Chelsea ===
Chelsea earned automatic qualification as the 1996–97 season winners of England's yearly competition, the FA Cup. In the first round of the event, they were drawn against Slovan Bratislava. Both matches resulted in 2–0 wins for the English outfit; the first leg took place at Stamford Bridge, and the second at Tehelné pole, as they won 4–0 in total.

Chelsea then faced Tromsø in the second round. They lost the first leg by 2–3 which took place at Alfheim Stadion, with Gianluca Vialli registering a brace. In the home leg, Chelsea beat Tromsø 7–1, during which Vialli scored a hat-trick; the other goals were scored by Dan Petrescu, who contributed with a double, Gianfranco Zola and Frank Leboeuf to ensure an amassed score of 9–4.

In the quarter-finals, Chelsea clashed with Real Betis. The opening game at Estadio Manuel Ruíz de Lopera was won with 2–1 after a Tore André Flo double, before a 3–1 win at home with goals signed by Frank Sinclair, Roberto Di Matteo and Zola were enough to hand Chelsea an overall 5–2 victory. Their opposition in the semi-finals was Italian side Vicenza. Chelsea lost the away fixture 0–1, at Stadio Romeo Menti. They ended the round with a 3–1 home victory, following goals by Gus Poyet, Zola and Mark Hughes to send them through to their second final.

=== VfB Stuttgart ===
VfB Stuttgart received a place in the tournament, following their celebrations in the 1996–97 campaign, of the German Cup, Germany's annual cup contest. Starting in the round of 32, the Germans were pitted against ÍBV. They rounded off the first tie, by completing a 3–1 win at Hásteinsvöllur, before a 2–1 victory at the Gottlieb-Daimler-Stadion was enough to see them through with 5–2.

As Stuttgart entered the second round, they were up against Germinal Ekeren. They won the first leg 4–0 at Veltwijckstadion with Fredi Bobic and Jonathan Akpoborie each scoring twice. In the return game, Stuttgart suffered a 2–4 loss, but regardless of this, goals from Frank Verlaat and Gerhard Poschner ensured they won the stage 6–4.

In the quarter-finals, Slavia Prague were Stuttgart's next opponents. The away leg at Stadion Evžena Rošického ended in a 1–1 draw following a Poschner goal. Back on German soil, Stuttgart won 2–0 after Krasimir Balakov scored two goals, giving them a 3–1 overall win. In the semi-finals, Stuttgart were drawn against Lokomotiv Moscow. The first home leg ended 2–1 to the German side, with Bobic finding the winning goal late; the first was netted by Akpoborie. At Lokomotiv Stadium, Bobic once again managed to score, during the first half, which proved to be decisive as Stuttgart won 1–0 and the concluding tie 3–1 to proceed to the final.

== Pre-match ==
=== Background ===
Both Chelsea and Stuttgart ended their seasons in fourth place of their respective leagues, the FA Premier League and the Bundesliga. Chelsea beat Bolton Wanderers 2–0 on the last matchday, while Stuttgart oversaw a 1–0 win over Werder Bremen. Both sides also progressed in their cup competitions – Chelsea lost against Manchester United with three to five in the 1997–98 FA Cup third round, but found success with a 2–0 victory over Middlesbrough in the 1998 Football League Cup final. Stuttgart saw themselves overrun 0–2 by Bayern Munich in the 1997 German League Cup final, only to succumb to Bayern again with a 0–3 deficit in the 1997–98 German Cup semi-final.

Chelsea and Stuttgart faced each other for the first time in European football. The English side were appearing in their second Cup Winners' Cup final, having won the tournament in 1971, while Stuttgart made their debut. Chelsea had met German clubs once, in the 1965–66 season of the Inter-Cities Fairs Cup against 1860 Munich – Chelsea advanced to the next round after managing a 2–2 stalemate at the Grünwalder Stadion, and a 1–0 home win.

Stuttgart had been pitted against English clubs on two meetings of the same competition, the former over Burnley in the following season. The Germans were knocked out in the opening stage, after being held 1–1, in the first game at Neckarstadion, before following up with a 0–2 loss at Turf Moor. The latter was opposite Leeds United, in the 1992–93 season of the UEFA Champions League; the club saw themselves be eliminated in the same fashion, as they won 3–0 at home, before losing the second leg 4–1. However, Leeds were awarded an automatic 3–0 win, after Stuttgart were found to have fielded an ineligible player. A play-off in Camp Nou was required to decide the round, which Stuttgart fell with 1–2.

=== Ticketing ===
Both teams were each given 12,000 tickets – the remaining 6,000 tickets were released, for purchase to the Swedish people. However, Stuttgart decided to send 11,000 of their 12,000 tickets back to UEFA, due to the German club's supporters finding it difficult to make their way to the country, as well as the absence of air flights available. Subsequently, none of the unsold tickets were granted for Chelsea and its followers; the consequences proved worse, when Stuttgart announced that they had issued tickets alone for those who had ordered the more higher-priced package. Thousands of these tickets made their way onto the black market and were snapped up by Chelsea fans. On the day of the match it was estimated that at least 25,000 of the 30,000 crowd were Chelsea fans. With most flying out from England, it also represented the largest airlift of people from the UK for a single event since World War II.

=== Venue ===
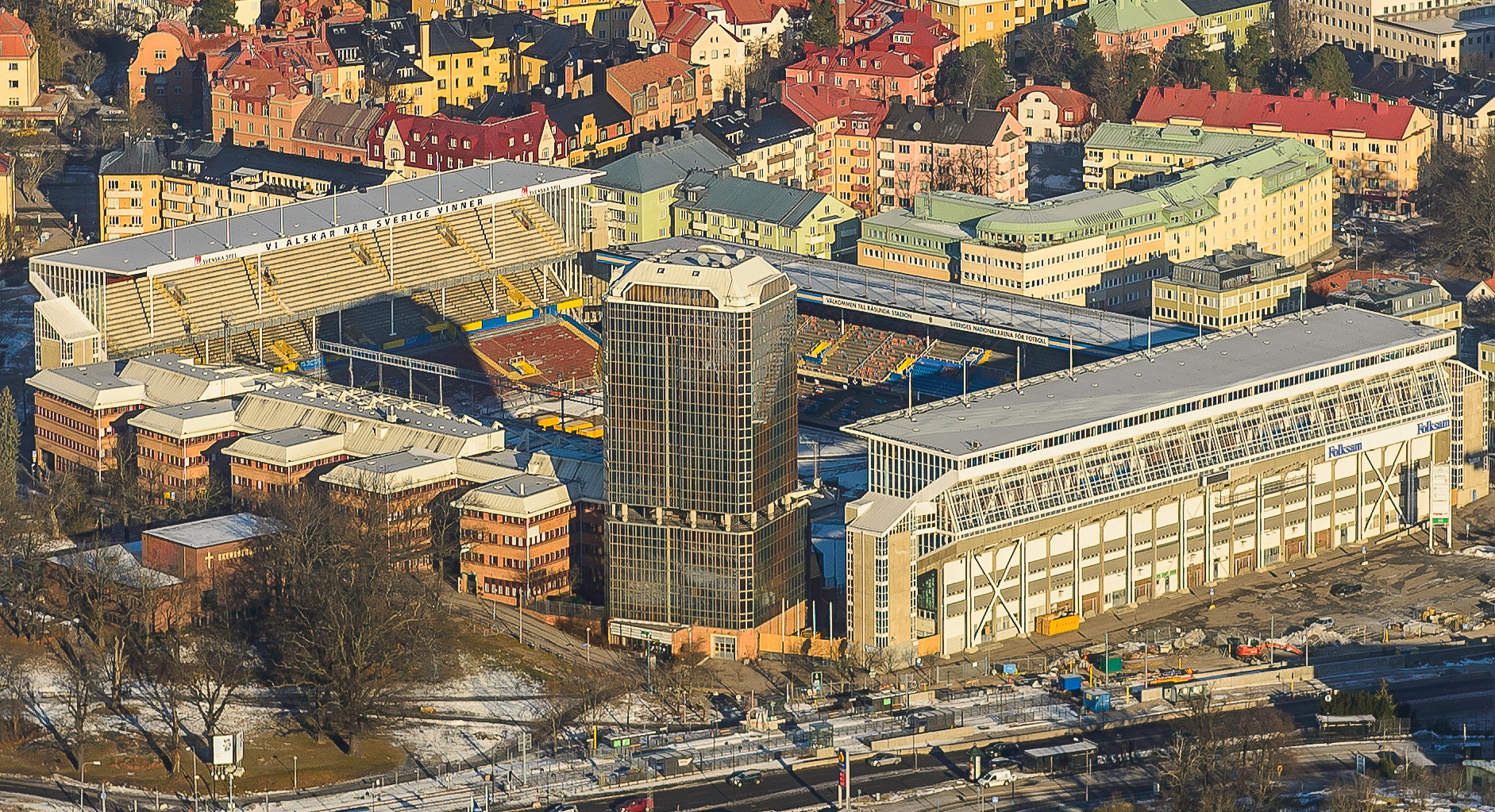
The 1998 final was held at Råsunda Stadium.

Råsunda Stadium was revealed as the official venue of the final in December 1997. Located in Solna, Stockholm, the stadium opened its doors to the public in 1937, and was used by the Sweden national team for their games in the 1958 FIFA World Cup, including the final, as well as most of their general ties. Råsunda also held four of the national team's fixtures, in the 1992 European Championship, and the 1995 FIFA Women's World Cup Final; it was also the home base of AIK's matches, until demolishment plans began in 2012. For the final, Råsunda had a capacity of generally 35,000.

=== Match ball ===
Adidas Tricolore was the match ball of the final. It was the sixteenth edition in the Adidas football series; the name "Tricolore" translates to "three-coloured" and contains a tricolour crest and a cockerel, along with French classic themes which were used as influences, for the ball's construction, to illustrate the nation's flag. The Tricolore became the first ball available in different colours and was later introduced at that year's World Cup. It was the last ball to carry the vintage Tango layout.

=== Match officials ===
Stefano Braschi from the Italian Football Federation, was appointed to officiate the final, making it his first time to decide a closing match in a European contest. He was recognised as a professional Serie A referee in 1992. The Italian took charge of his first European fixture in a 1996 UEFA Intertoto Cup group stage meeting between Lierse and Groningen. The same year, Braschi made FIFA's international referees list; he debuted in February 1997 in an Israel–Germany friendly. Before the final, he had been the match official in four Champions League and two UEFA Cup matches (including one qualifier), as well as four international friendlies. Braschi was accompanied by an all-Italian team, which was made up of assistant referees Gennaro Mazzei and Pietro Contente – the reserve referee was unveiled as Livio Bazzoli.

== Broadcasting ==
The final was screened in 144 countries worldwide, with over 250 million viewers expected to follow the game. In the United Kingdom, the event was covered by BBC One, after winning the television rights over Channel 5. In German television, ARD were committed to the final; viewer figures were reported to be an estimate 8.9 million. In Sweden, SVT1 and SVT2, the two channels of the television network Sveriges Television, jointly televised the match.

== Match ==
=== Team selection ===
Chelsea centre back Frank Sinclair and left backs Graeme Le Saux and Celestine Babayaro were all sidelined for the final due to injuries, causing player-manager Vialli to select Michael Duberry, and rookie third-choice left-back Danny Granville, who had recovered from an abscess pain. Central midfielder Poyet was also included in the starting line-up to join captain Dennis Wise, after returning from a damaged cruciate ligament. Together with forward and lead goalscorer Vialli, Flo began in the attack, instead of Zola, who was named as a substitute, despite making an improvement from his damaged groin, sustained in a league fixture against Liverpool in April.

Stuttgart suffered from no player injuries, but defenders Frank Verlaat and Martin Spanring's bans, prevented them from taking part in the game, leading to manager Joachim Löw to replace Verlaat, with midfielder Murat Yakin as libero, and Thomas Berthold taking over Spanring's role in the middle.

=== Summary ===
==== First half ====
Chelsea's goalscoring chance came in the fifth minute when Poyet found Di Matteo, who fumbled his opportunity as it went over the goal. Stuttgart almost took the lead through Bobic, who took advantage of Steve Clarke's poor clearance but Bobic's attempt went just past the right goalpost. The Germans continued to push forward, as Balakov had a chance on goal, after being found by Poschner, but his shot was kept out by Ed de Goey to mark the first save of the match. Chelsea held on however; a few minutes later, Poyet ran towards the ball to direct a powerful volley on goal following a weak clearing header from Berthold, but a well-placed Franz Wohlfahrt dived to read the attempt. Chelsea had another chance before half time, which saw Wise from a Di Matteo free kick launch another volley, with the successive effort going just off the target.

==== Second half ====
Prior to the first half, Chelsea continued to dominate possession and round-up more opportunities – the ball was given to Wise, after cooperation between Petrescu and Vialli, whose shot went just across the left goal. It did not take long, before Granville generated another endeavor for Chelsea to make Wohlfahrt throw himself to the right in order to prevent the shot. The club made its first substitute change in the 71st minute, which saw Flo being replaced by Zola. He made an effect immediately, picking up the ball after a well-timed pass by Wise, and finishing with a half volley in the penalty box, past Wohlfahrt, which found its way straight in the top right corner. As the match went on, Petrescu was sent off for an illegal tackle on Yakin. It did not affect Chelsea as Stuttgart failed to produce anything to turn the final in their favour. Stuttgart's situation proved worse when they were also reduced to ten men, as Poschner was dismissed after quarrels with referee Braschi.

=== Details ===
13 May 1998
20:45 CEST

Chelsea (England)	1–0	(Germany) VfB Stuttgart
Zola 71'	Report

Råsunda Stadium, Stockholm
Attendance: 30,216
Referee: Stefano Braschi (Italy)

Chelsea	VfB Stuttgart

5-3-2 formation
GK	1	(Netherlands) Ed de Goey
CB	6	(Scotland) Steve Clarke
CB	5	(France) Frank Leboeuf
CB	12	(England) Michael Duberry
LWB	17	(England) Danny Granville
RWB	2	(Romania) Dan Petrescu	(red card) 85'
CM	11	(England) Dennis Wise (c)	(yellow card) 25'
CM	8	(Uruguay) Gus Poyet		(substituted off) 81'
CM	16	(Italy) Roberto Di Matteo
CF	9	(Italy) Gianluca Vialli
CF	19	(Norway) Tore André Flo		(substituted off) 70'
Substitutes:
GK	13	(England) Kevin Hitchcock
DF	18	(England) Andy Myers
DF	26	(France) Laurent Charvet
MF	24	(England) Eddie Newton		(substituted on) 81'
MF	28	(England) Jody Morris
FW	10	(Wales) Mark Hughes
FW	25	(Italy) Gianfranco Zola		(substituted on) 70' (goal) 71'
Player-manager:
(Italy) Gianluca Vialli

GK	1	(Austria) Franz Wohlfahrt
SW	6	(Switzerland) Murat Yakin
CB	14	(Germany) Thomas Schneider		(substituted off) 55'
CB	4	(Germany) Thomas Berthold
RM	8	(Germany) Marco Haber		(substituted off) 75'
CM	20	(Croatia) Zvonimir Soldo
CM	23	(Germany) Gerhard Poschner	(red card) 90+2'
LM	7	(Germany) Matthias Hagner		(substituted off) 79'
AM	10	(Bulgaria) Krasimir Balakov
CF	19	(Nigeria) Jonathan Akpoborie	(yellow card) 33'
CF	11	(Germany) Fredi Bobic (c)
Substitutes:
GK	25	(Germany) Marc Ziegler
DF	21	(Germany) Jochen Endreß		(substituted on) 55'
DF	26	(North Macedonia) Mitko Stojkovski
MF	15	(Germany) Matthias Becker
MF	16	(Federal Republic of Yugoslavia) Kristijan Đorđević		(substituted on) 75'
MF	22	(Hungary) Krisztián Lisztes
FW	9	(Federal Republic of Yugoslavia) Sreto Ristić		(substituted on) 79'
Manager:
(Germany) Joachim Löw

Man of the Match:
(Italy) Gianfranco Zola (Chelsea)

Assistant referees:
Gennaro Mazzei (Italy)
Pietro Contente (Italy)
Reserve referee:
Livio Bazzoli (Italy)

Match rules

- 90 minutes.
- 30 minutes of golden goal extra time if necessary.
- Penalty shoot-out if scores still level.
- Seven named substitutes.
- Maximum of three substitutions.

=== Statistics ===
First half
	Chelsea	VfB Stuttgart
Goals scored	0	0
Total shots	7	4
Shots on target	1	1
Ball possession	47%	53%
Corner kicks	1	2
Fouls committed	9	11
Offsides	2	2
Yellow cards	1	1
Red cards	0	0

Second half
	Chelsea	VfB Stuttgart
Goals scored	1	0
Total shots	12	7
Shots on target	4	1
Ball possession	—N/a	—N/a
Corner kicks	4	5
Fouls committed	17	22
Offsides	2	5
Yellow cards	0	0
Red cards	1	1

Overall
	Chelsea	VfB Stuttgart
Goals scored	1	0
Total shots	19	11
Shots on target	5	2
Ball possession	48%	52%
Corner kicks	5	7
Fouls committed	26	33
Offsides	4	7
Yellow cards	1	1
Red cards	1	1

== Post-match ==
Following Chelsea's victory, player-manager Vialli was satisfied with his club's performance, commending the substitution of Zola by assistant manager Graham Rix: "He decided he had a feeling and he was right". Vialli also praised Zola, but felt that the honours had to be shared by all the players including Vialli himself, who took part in the match: "It was a great first touch – he put the ball in the net and we won the cup. But the credit has to be shared between all the chaps – and I am over the moon." The Italian further added that their goal now was to win the league championship: "The next step will be the Premier League, fingers crossed. I am still the player-manager and I have to be one next season. We are very happy to win, but we do not want to stop here. We want to keep improving and next season we will start trying to win the Premier League, which is our aim now."

Zola himself was happy with his achievements to the Chelsea side, but when asked if his substitution was all projected, he denied it, stating: "It wasn't planned. In the moment, I used my positive strength and I got a reward for the passion, the work not only I, but the masseur Mimmo Pezza did together in Rimini. The injury should take one month to heal, Mimmo Pezza helped me be fit in less than half that. I thank this man for a beautiful moment which will be in my heart for as long as I can remember." Their victory meant Aston Villa gained a place in the 1998–99 UEFA Cup.

Stuttgart manager Joachim Löw was disappointed with the defeat, but remained confident about his future at the team, as well as the season: "I'm calmly looking forward to the discussion. The club has to approach me. I have a contract until 1999. There must be some tough words. For me, the season has been positive". His word was also shared by Bobic who felt that his team were treated unfairly to the goal, also taking time to defend Löw: "We need to talk about mistakes and learn from them, it does not mean that it is necessary to change the manager". He added: "It is bitter to lose by such a goal". However, Verlaat dissented, and criticised Stuttgart's campaign: "The club has to make up its mind finally. We could have done better this season. We carelessly squandered about eight games". Yakin agreed and offered his own comments: "You have to talk about many things, you cannot work together in the way it was this year."

The two teams were drawn against each other again in two legs in the first knockout round of the 2003–04 UEFA Champions League knockout stage. The first match was held in Stuttgart on 25 February 2004 at Gottlieb-Daimler-Stadion, which Chelsea also won 1–0 after an own goal scored by Fernando Meira, while a scoreless draw played on 9 March 2004 in Stamford Bridge was enough for Chelsea to advance to the quarter-finals with a 1–0 aggregate win.

== See also ==
- 1998 UEFA Champions League Final
- 1998 UEFA Cup Final
- 1998 UEFA Super Cup
- Chelsea F.C. in international football competitions
