= Ed de Goey =

Dutch footballer (born 1966)

Personal information
- Date of birth: 20 December 1966 (age 59)
- Place of birth: Gouda, Netherlands
- Height: 1.98 m (6 ft 6 in)
- Position: Goalkeeper

Team information
- Current team: VOC Rotterdam (goalkeeper coach)

Youth career
- 1972–1981: Olympia
- 1981–1985: Sparta

Senior career*
Years	Team	Apps	(Gls)
1985–1990	Sparta	145	(0)
1990–1997	Feyenoord	235	(0)
1997–2003	Chelsea	123	(0)
2003–2006	Stoke City	56	(0)
Total		559	(0)

International career
1984–1985	Netherlands U19	5	(0)
1986–1989	Netherlands U21	16	(0)
1992–1998	Netherlands	31	(0)

Managerial career
- 2007–2008: QPR (goalkeeper coach)
- 2010–2014: RKC (goalkeeper coach)
- 2014–2015: DHC (goalkeeper coach)
- 2015–2018: ADO Den Haag (goalkeeper coach)
- 2018–: VOC (goalkeeper coach)
Medal record
Men's football
Representing Netherlands
UEFA European Championship
Bronze medal – third place	2000
- * Club domestic league appearances and goals

Ed de Goeij (born 20 December 1966), known as Ed de Goey, is a Dutch professional football coach and former player who played as a goalkeeper. He is currently the goalkeeping coach of Vierde Divisie club VOC Rotterdam.

In a 20-year playing career, de Goey played for Sparta Rotterdam, Feyenoord, Chelsea and Stoke City. He played 31 times for the Netherlands national team.

== Club career ==
De Goey started playing football at hometown amateur side Olympia before moving to professional club Sparta. He signed for Feyenoord in 1990 and stayed there for seven years. During his time in Rotterdam, he missed a total of just eight games and won one Eredivisie title (in 1993) and four KNVB Cups in 1991, 1992, 1994 and 1995. He was awarded the Dutch Golden Boot in 1994.

De Goey joined Chelsea in June 1997 from Feyenoord for £2,250,000. He was first choice goalkeeper for the first three years of his six years spell, and was a member of the sides that won the League Cup, the Cup Winners' Cup (both in 1998) and the FA Cup in 2000. In 1999–2000, he set club records for most appearances (59) and clean sheets (27) during a season, both since surpassed by Frank Lampard and Petr Čech respectively. De Goey later lost his place in the side to Italian Carlo Cudicini and made just 25 appearances in his final three seasons. He was released by Chelsea in May 2003.

He joined Stoke City in August 2003 and became the club's first choice goalkeeper for the 2003–04 season where he made 38 appearances. He faced competition with Steve Simonsen in 2004–05 and made 17 appearances before losing his place completely in 2005–06 and was released at the end of the season.

== International career ==
De Goey played 16 games for the Netherlands national under-21 football team and 5 for the U19s.

He also played 31 times for the senior Netherlands team, including every game for his country at the 1994 FIFA World Cup where the Netherlands reached the quarter-finals, losing to eventual winners Brazil.

== Coaching career ==
On 6 July 2007, De Goey joined Queens Park Rangers as a first team coach, but chairman Gianni Paladini terminated his contract before the end of the season. In July 2010, De Goey joined RKC Waalwijk as a goalkeeping coach, a position he held until 2014, when he parted ways with the club. A few weeks later, De Goey joined DHC Delft in the Dutch Sunday Hoofdklasse A League. In 2015 he was named goalkeeper coach at ADO Den Haag. As of 2018, De Goey is goalkeeping coach at Dutch fifth tier side VOC Rotterdam.

== Personal life ==
De Goey is married and has two sons. He lives in Bergschenhoek and manages his own football goalkeeping school.

== Career statistics ==
=== Club ===
Appearances and goals by club, season and competition
Club	Season	League			National cup		League cup		Other (Note: Includes FA Charity Shield, UEFA Champions League, UEFA Cup Winners' Cup, and UEFA Super Cup.)		Total	
Club	Season	Division	Apps	Goals	Apps	Goals	Apps	Goals	Apps	Goals	Apps	Goals
Sparta Rotterdam	1985–86	Eredivisie	12	0	—		—		—		12	0
Sparta Rotterdam	1986–87	Eredivisie	34	0	—		—		—		34	0
Sparta Rotterdam	1987–88	Eredivisie	34	0	—		—		—		34	0
Sparta Rotterdam	1988–89	Eredivisie	31	0	—		—		—		31	0
Sparta Rotterdam	1989–90	Eredivisie	34	0	—		—		—		34	0
Sparta Rotterdam	Total		145	0	—		—		—		145	0
Feyenoord	1990–91	Eredivisie	34	0	—		—		—		34	0
Feyenoord	1991–92	Eredivisie	34	0	—		—		—		34	0
Feyenoord	1992–93	Eredivisie	33	0	—		—		—		33	0
Feyenoord	1993–94	Eredivisie	34	0	—		—		—		34	0
Feyenoord	1994–95	Eredivisie	32	0	—		—		—		32	0
Feyenoord	1995–96	Eredivisie	34	0	—		—		—		34	0
Feyenoord	1996–97	Eredivisie	34	0	—		—		—		34	0
Feyenoord	Total		235	0	—		—		—		235	0
Chelsea	1997–98	Premier League	28	0	1	0	0	0	10	0	39	0
Chelsea	1998–99	Premier League	35	0	6	0	0	0	8	0	49	0
Chelsea	1999–2000	Premier League	37	0	6	0	0	0	16	0	59	0
Chelsea	2000–01	Premier League	15	0	0	0	1	0	1	0	17	0
Chelsea	2001–02	Premier League	6	0	0	0	0	0	2	0	8	0
Chelsea	2002–03	Premier League	2	0	1	0	0	0	0	0	3	0
Chelsea	Total		123	0	14	0	1	0	37	0	175	0
Stoke City	2003–04	First Division	37	0	0	0	1	0	—		38	0
Stoke City	2004–05	Championship	17	0	0	0	0	0	—		17	0
Stoke City	2005–06	Championship	2	0	1	0	0	0	—		3	0
Stoke City	Total		56	0	1	0	1	0	—		58	0
Career total			559	0	15	0	2	0	37	0	613	0

=== International ===
Appearances and goals by national team and year
National team	Year	Apps	Goals
Netherlands	1992	1	0
Netherlands	1993	7	0
Netherlands	1994	15	0
Netherlands	1995	4	0
Netherlands	1996	1	0
Netherlands	1997	1	0
Netherlands	1998	2	0
Total		31	0

== Honours ==
Feyenoord

- Eredivisie: 1992–93
- KNVB Cup: 1990–91, 1991–92, 1993–94, 1994–95
- Dutch Supercup: 1991

Chelsea

- FA Cup: 1999–2000
- Football League Cup: 1997–98
- FA Charity Shield: 2000
- UEFA Cup Winners' Cup: 1997–98
- UEFA Super Cup: 1998

Individual

- Dutch Goalkeeper of the Year: 1993
- Golden Shoe: 1994
