= List of Italy international footballers born outside Italy =

This is a list of Italy international footballers who were born outside Italy.

== List ==
| Player | Caps | Years active | Nation of birth | Source |
|---|---|---|---|---|
| Eugenio Mosso | 1 | 1914 | Argentina | |
| Emilio Badini | 2 | 1920 | Argentina | |
| Cesare Lovati | 6 | 1920–1921 | Argentina | |
| Félix Romano | 5 | 1921–1924 | Argentina | |
| Giovanni Moscardini | 9 | 1921–1925 | Scotland | |
| Julio Libonatti | 18 | 1926–1931 | Argentina | |
| Attila Sallustro | 2 | 1929–1932 | Paraguay | |
| Raimundo Orsi | 35 | 1929–1935 | Argentina | |
| Raffaele Sansone | 3 | 1932 | Uruguay | |
| Francisco Fedullo | 2 | 1932–1933 | Uruguay | |
| Anfilogino Guarisi | 6 | 1932–1934 | Brazil | |
| Luis Monti | 18 | 1932–1936 | Argentina | |
| Attilio Demaría | 13 | 1932–1940 | Argentina | |
| Enrique Guaita | 10 | 1934–1935 | Argentina | |
| Otávio Fantoni | 1 | 1934 | Brazil | |
| Roberto Porta | 1 | 1935 | Uruguay | |
| Alejandro Scopelli | 1 | 1935 | Argentina | |
| Ricardo Faccio | 5 | 1935–1936 | Uruguay | |
| Ernesto Mascheroni | 2 | 1935–1936 | Uruguay | |
| Michele Andreolo | 26 | 1936–1942 | Uruguay | |
| Ettore Puricelli | 1 | 1939 | Uruguay | |
| Rinaldo Martino | 1 | 1949 | Argentina | |
| Eduardo Ricagni | 3 | 1953–1955 | Argentina | |
| Juan Alberto Schiaffino | 4 | 1954–1958 | Uruguay | |
| Eddie Firmani | 3 | 1956–1958 | South Africa | |
| Miguel Montuori | 12 | 1956–1960 | Argentina | |
| Bruno Pesaola | 1 | 1957 | Argentina | |
| Alcides Ghiggia | 5 | 1957–1959 | Uruguay | |
| Dino da Costa | 1 | 1958 | Brazil | |
| Francisco Lojacono | 8 | 1959–1962 | Argentina | |
| Antonio Angelillo | 2 | 1960–1962 | Argentina | |
| Omar Sívori | 9 | 1961–1962 | Argentina | |
| José Altafini | 6 | 1961–1962 | Brazil | |
| Humberto Maschio | 4 | 1962 | Argentina | |
| Angelo Sormani | 7 | 1962–1963 | Brazil | |
| Giuseppe Wilson | 3 | 1974 | England | |
| Claudio Gentile | 71 | 1975–1984 | Libya | |
| Roberto Di Matteo | 34 | 1994–1998 | Switzerland | |
| Matteo Ferrari | 11 | 2002–2004 | Algeria | |
| Simone Perrotta | 48 | 2002–2009 | England | |
| Mauro Camoranesi | 55 | 2003–2010 | Argentina | |
| Giuseppe Rossi | 30 | 2008–2014 | United States | |
| Amauri | 1 | 2010 | Brazil | |
| Cristian Ledesma | 1 | 2010 | Argentina | |
| Dani Osvaldo | 14 | 2011–2014 | Argentina | |
| Thiago Motta | 30 | 2011–2016 | Brazil | |
| Ezequiel Schelotto | 1 | 2012 | Argentina | |
| Roberto Soriano | 9 | 2014–2020 | Germany | |
| Gabriel Paletta | 3 | 2014 | Argentina | |
| Éder | 26 | 2015–2017 | Brazil | |
| Nicola Sansone | 3 | 2015–present | Germany | |
| Franco Vázquez | 2 | 2015 | Argentina | |
| Jorginho | 54 | 2016–2024 | Brazil | |
| Emerson | 29 | 2018–present | Brazil | |
| Vincenzo Grifo | 9 | 2018–present | Germany | |
| Rafael Tolói | 14 | 2021–present | Brazil | |
| João Pedro | 1 | 2022–present | Brazil | |
| Luiz Felipe | 1 | 2022–present | Brazil | |
| Mateo Retegui | 8 | 2023–present | Argentina | |

== List by country of birth ==
| Country | Total |
|---|---|
| Argentina | 25 |
| Brazil | 13 |
| Uruguay | 9 |
| Germany | 3 |
| England | 2 |
| Algeria | 1 |
| Libya | 1 |
| Paraguay | 1 |
| Scotland | 1 |
| South Africa | 1 |
| Switzerland | 1 |
| United States | 1 |
