= Bernard Lambourde =

French footballer (born 1971)

Personal information
- Date of birth: 11 May 1971 (age 55)
- Place of birth: Pointe-à-Pitre, Guadeloupe, France
- Height: 1.87 m (6 ft 2 in)
- Position: Defender

Senior career*
Years	Team	Apps	(Gls)
1991–1996	Cannes	13	(1)
1994–1995	→ Angers (loan)	36	(1)
1996–1997	Bordeaux	28	(1)
1997–2001	Chelsea	40	(2)
2000	→ Portsmouth (loan)	6	(0)
2001–2003	Bastia	23	(1)
2003	Nancy	12	(1)
2003	Al Wahda		
Total		174	(7)
- * Club domestic league appearances and goals

Bernard Lambourde (born 11 May 1971) is a French former professional footballer who played as a defender.

== Career ==
Lambourde was born in Pointe-à-Pitre, Guadeloupe.

He joined Chelsea in 1997, and in his first season at the club he made seven league appearances. That season Chelsea also won the 1997–98 League Cup and the 1997–98 UEFA Cup Winners' Cup. Lambourde was not part of the squad for either final but contributed three appearances to each of the cup runs. During his spell in England at Chelsea, he is most remembered for scoring the winner in a 1–0 away victory over rivals Tottenham Hotspur in February 2000. He also scored twice more for Chelsea, against Middlesbrough in the league and Vålerenga in the Cup Winners' Cup. He was on the bench when Chelsea won both the 1998 UEFA Super Cup and the 2000 FA Charity Shield.

At the start of the 2000–01 season, Lambourde found himself out of favour at Chelsea. After failing to make an appearance that campaign, he joined Portsmouth on loan in September, playing six games. Upon his return to Chelsea he featured in just one game as a late substitute against Manchester United, this proving to be his last appearance for the club.
