= Eddie Newton =

English football player and manager (born 1971)

Personal information
- Full name: Edward John Ikem Newton
- Date of birth: 13 December 1971 (age 54)
- Place of birth: Hammersmith, England
- Height: 5 ft 11 in (1.80 m)
- Position: Defensive midfielder

Youth career
- 1985–1990: Chelsea

Senior career*
Years	Team	Apps	(Gls)
1990–1999	Chelsea	165	(8)
1992	→ Cardiff City (loan)	18	(4)
1999–2000	Birmingham City	4	(0)
2000	Oxford United	7	(0)
2000	Barnet	4	(0)
2000–2001	Hayes	6	(0)
Total		204	(12)

International career
1993	England U21	2	(0)

Managerial career
- 2008–2009: Milton Keynes Dons (assistant manager)
- 2009–2011: West Bromwich Albion (assistant manager)
- 2012: Chelsea (assistant manager)
- 2015–2016: Chelsea (assistant manager)
- 2019–2020: Chelsea (assistant manager)
- 2020: Trabzonspor (assistant manager)
- 2020: Trabzonspor
- * Club domestic league appearances and goals

Edward John Ikem Newton (born 13 December 1971) is an English football manager and former professional footballer.

As a player, he was a defensive midfielder from 1990 until 2001 notably for Chelsea where he scored in the 1997 FA Cup final. He also played in the Football League for Cardiff City, Birmingham City, Oxford United and Barnet and in the Conference National for Hayes. He also earned two caps for the England U21 side.

Having begun his coaching career on the staff of Milton Keynes Dons and West Bromwich Albion, he returned to Chelsea where he served as assistant manager to Roberto Di Matteo before the latter was replaced by Rafael Benítez. In December 2015 he was reappointed as assistant manager to interim manager Guus Hiddink. In 2020 he had a brief spell in charge of Turkish side Trabzonspor.

== Playing career ==
Newton was born in Hammersmith, London. After making his way through the Chelsea youth system he was loaned out to Cardiff City in January 1992, making his debut in a 4–0 win over Chesterfield. Cardiff fell three points short of a play-off place and Newton returned to Chelsea. He played for Chelsea in the 1994 FA Cup Final, but his foul on Denis Irwin in the second half saw him cautioned and led to Manchester United receiving a penalty which was scored by Eric Cantona. He then made a defensive error which allowed United's Mark Hughes to make it 3–0.

Chelsea went on to lose 4–0 but United had won the double to qualify for the European Cup, allowing Chelsea to play European football for the first time since the 1970s with a place in the UEFA Cup Winners' Cup. Newton was part of the team that reached the semi-finals of the 1994–95 competition and also the semi-finals of the 1995–96 FA Cup.

Newton scored Chelsea's second, clinching, goal in the 1997 FA Cup Final to seal a 2–0 win over Middlesbrough. He won the Cup Winners' Cup and League Cup with the club a year later, but was thereafter hampered in his quest for a starting place by injuries and manager Gianluca Vialli's signing of French World Cup-winning midfielder Didier Deschamps.

He joined Birmingham City in July 1999 on a free transfer before spending short spells at various lower-league clubs, including Oxford United and Barnet. He retired due to a knee injury.

== Management and coaching career ==
On 2 July 2008 Newton was appointed assistant manager to Roberto Di Matteo at Milton Keynes Dons. A year later, on 30 June 2009, Di Matteo was appointed head coach of West Bromwich Albion and it was reported that Newton would be joining him at the club as assistant head coach. When Di Matteo was relieved of his duties in January 2011, Newton also left the club.

On 5 March 2012 it was announced that Newton would be joining the back room staff at Chelsea, supporting Roberto Di Matteo. Di Matteo had just taken over as interim Head Coach at Chelsea following the departure of André Villas-Boas. In his short time as assistant manager at Chelsea he has won the UEFA Champions League and FA Cup. He currently helps to oversee the progress of Chelsea's loan players after having been assistant first team coach under Guus Hiddink in for the second half of the previous season. Following the departure of Hiddink, Newton returned to the loan technical coach role until 2019, when he became an assistant coach to the first team following the appointment of Frank Lampard as head coach.

He was appointed assistant manager at Trabzonspor in February 2020.

On 2 August 2020, Newton was appointed by Trabzonspor on a permanent basis, after a successful period as caretaker winning the Turkish Cup. On 31 October 2020, he was sacked as the club's manager after winning just one of his seven games in charge.

== Personal life ==
Born in England, Newton is of Nigerian and Jamaican descent.

On July 18th 2026, Cassius Newton, the 34 year old son of Eddie Newton, died during a hike in the mountainous region of Wadi Naqab, United Arab Emirates (UAE).

His friend, Arin Martinson, also died during the hike. Both lived in the resort of Ras Al Khaimah.

Essex Coroner Michelle Brown said both men died from severe rising body temperatures which led to organ failure.

== Managerial statistics ==
As of match played 30 October 2020

Managerial record by team and tenure
Team	Nat	From	To	Record								Ref
Team	Nat	From	To	G	W	D	L	GF	GA	GD	Win %	Ref
Trabzonspor	(Turkey)	20 July 2020	31 October 2020	9	3	2	4	13	15	−2	33.33	
Total				9	3	2	4	13	15	−2	33.33	—

== Honours ==
=== Player ===
Chelsea

- FA Cup: 1996–97; runner-up: 1993–94
- Football League Cup: 1997–98
- UEFA Cup Winners' Cup: 1997–98
- UEFA Super Cup: 1998

=== Assistant Manager ===
Chelsea

- FA Cup: 2011–12
- UEFA Champions League: 2011–12

=== Manager ===
Trabzonspor

- Turkish Cup: 2019–20
