= 1998 UEFA Super Cup =

- Match programme cover
| Real Madrid | Chelsea |
| (Spain) | (England) |
| 0 | 1 |
- Date: 28 August 1998
- Venue: Stade Louis II, Monaco
- Man of the Match: Gus Poyet (Chelsea)
- Referee: Marc Batta (France)
- Attendance: 11,589

The 1998 UEFA Super Cup was a football match that was played on 28 August 1998 at Stade Louis II, Monaco, contested between Champions League winners Real Madrid and Cup Winners' Cup holders Chelsea. Neither team had previously won the trophy. Chelsea won the match 1–0 with a late goal from Gus Poyet.

This was the first Super Cup to be played as a one-off match at a neutral venue. Previously it was played over two legs, although on some occasions, only one match was played, due to special circumstances.

== Venue ==
The Stade Louis II in Monaco was the venue for the UEFA Super Cup for the second time. It was built in 1985, and is also the home of AS Monaco, who play in the French league system. The 1986 European Super Cup match between Steaua București, then holders of the European Cup and Dynamo Kyiv, holders of the UEFA Cup Winners' Cup, took place at the same stadium, in one-leg format.

== Teams ==
| Team | Qualification | Previous participation |
|---|---|---|
| (Spain) Real Madrid | 1997–98 UEFA Champions League winners | None |
| (England) Chelsea | 1997–98 UEFA Cup Winners' Cup winners | None |

== Match ==
=== Summary ===
Chelsea's Gus Poyet scored the only goal of the game in the 83rd minute with a right-footed finish from the edge of the penalty area to the right corner of the net after a pass from the left by Gianfranco Zola.

=== Details ===
28 August 1998
20:45 CEST

| Real Madrid (Spain) | 0–1 | (England) Chelsea |
|---|---|---|
| | Report | Poyet 83' |

Stade Louis II, Monaco
Attendance: 11,589
Referee: Marc Batta (France)

| Real Madrid | Chelsea |

| GK | 1 | (Germany) Bodo Illgner |
| RB | 2 | (Italy) Christian Panucci |
| CB | 4 | (Spain) Fernando Hierro |
| CB | 5 | (Spain) Manolo Sanchís (c) |
| LB | 3 | (Brazil) Roberto Carlos |
| RM | 22 | (France) Christian Karembeu | (yellow card) 52' | (substituted off) 58' |
| CM | 10 | (Netherlands) Clarence Seedorf |
| CM | 6 | (Argentina) Fernando Redondo |
| LM | 11 | (Brazil) Sávio |
| CF | 8 | (Federal Republic of Yugoslavia) Predrag Mijatović | | (substituted off) 73' |
| CF | 7 | (Spain) Raúl |
Substitutes:
| GK | 13 | (Spain) Pedro Contreras |
| DF | 12 | (Spain) Iván Campo |
| DF | 19 | (Spain) Fernando Sanz |
| MF | 14 | (Spain) Guti |
| MF | 16 | (Spain) Jaime |
| MF | 17 | (Croatia) Robert Jarni | | (substituted on) 73' |
| FW | 15 | (Spain) Fernando Morientes | (yellow card) 86' | (substituted on) 58' |
Manager:
(Netherlands) Guus Hiddink

| GK | 1 | (Netherlands) Ed de Goey |
| RB | 17 | (Spain) Albert Ferrer | (yellow card) 7' |
| CB | 6 | (France) Marcel Desailly |
| CB | 5 | (France) Frank Leboeuf |
| LB | 14 | (England) Graeme Le Saux |
| RM | 12 | (England) Michael Duberry |
| CM | 11 | (England) Dennis Wise (c) |
| CM | 16 | (Italy) Roberto Di Matteo | | (substituted off) 63' |
| LM | 3 | (Nigeria) Celestine Babayaro | (yellow card) 32' |
| CF | 25 | (Italy) Gianfranco Zola | | (substituted off) 83' |
| CF | 10 | (Italy) Pierluigi Casiraghi | | (substituted off) 89' |
Substitutes:
| GK | 13 | (England) Kevin Hitchcock |
| DF | 21 | (France) Bernard Lambourde |
| MF | 7 | (Denmark) Brian Laudrup | | (substituted on) 83' |
| MF | 8 | (Uruguay) Gus Poyet | | (substituted on) 63' |
| MF | 24 | (England) Eddie Newton |
| MF | 28 | (England) Jody Morris |
| FW | 19 | (Norway) Tore André Flo | | (substituted on) 89' |
Manager:
(Italy) Gianluca Vialli

Man of the Match:
Gus Poyet (Chelsea)

Assistant referees:
Pierre Ufrasi (France)
Jacques Mas (France)
Fourth official:
Pascal Garibian (France)

Match rules

- 90 minutes
- 30 minutes of golden goal extra time if necessary
- Penalty shoot-out if scores still level
- Seven named substitutes, of which up to three may be used

== See also ==
- 1998–99 UEFA Champions League
- 1998–99 UEFA Cup Winners' Cup
- 1998–99 Chelsea F.C. season
- 1998–99 Real Madrid CF season
- 1971 European Cup Winners' Cup final – contested between same teams
- Chelsea F.C. in international football
- Real Madrid CF in international football
