= Laurent Charvet =

French footballer (born 1973)

Personal information
- Full name: Laurent Jean Charvet
- Date of birth: 8 May 1973 (age 53)
- Place of birth: Béziers, Hérault, France
- Height: 1.80 m (5 ft 11 in)
- Position: Right back

Youth career
- Cannes

Senior career*
Years	Team	Apps	(Gls)
1991–1998	Cannes	88	(18)
1998	→ Chelsea (loan)	11	(2)
1998–2000	Newcastle United	40	(1)
2000–2002	Manchester City	23	(1)
2003	Sochaux	0	(0)
2008–2009	RC Grasse	0	(0)
Total		162	(21)
- * Club domestic league appearances and goals

Laurent Jean Charvet (French: [loʁɑ̃ ʃaʁvɛ]; born 8 May 1973) is a French former footballer who played as a right back.

Charvet played for Cannes having come through their youth academy in 1991, he went on to play in the Premier League for Chelsea, Newcastle United, and Manchester City before finishing his career back in France with Sochaux and RC Grasse.

== Early life ==
Charvet was born in Béziers, Hérault.

== Club career ==
Charvet began his career at Cannes in 1994. Between then and 1997 he appeared 99 times for the club and scored 19 goals. (Note: Laurent Charvet – French league stats at LFP – also available in French (archived)) In the 1997–98 season he was loaned out to the English Premier League team Chelsea for whom he appeared 11 times, scoring two goals in defeats to West Ham and Leeds. He was an unused substitute in Chelsea's UEFA Cup Winners' Cup final win over VfB Stuttgart.

In 1998 he was sold to Newcastle United for £750,000. Between that time and the year 2000 he played 40 times for the team and scored 1 goal against Middlesbrough. Whilst at Newcastle he played in the 1999 FA Cup Final.

Charvet signed a four-year contract with Manchester City at the start of the 2000–01 season following a £1 million transfer from Newcastle, joining as a replacement for out of form Richard Edghill. He, however, was unable to be the right back many City fans had hoped for and lost his place in the team. The following season, Kevin Keegan replaced Joe Royle as manager and Charvet was given his chance again. But in the 3-5-2 formation that Keegan adopted, Shaun Wright-Phillips was preferred to the Frenchman in the right wing-back position as was Edghill. Charvet played for City 23 times, scoring once. He left the club by mutual consent in October 2002 having made just three appearances for the club under Keegan.

Having trained with Monaco for a while after leaving City, Charvet joined French side Sochaux in January 2003.

Following his retirement from professional football at the end of the 2002–03 season, Charvet joined French amateur side RC Grasse in 2008 at the age of 35.

== Honours ==
Newcastle United

- FA Cup runner-up: 1998–99
