= 1998 Football League Cup final =

- Match programme cover
- Event: 1997–98 Football League Cup
Chelsea	Middlesbrough
2	0
- After extra time
- Date: 29 March 1998
- Venue: Wembley Stadium, London
- Man of the Match: Dennis Wise (Chelsea)
- Referee: Peter Jones (Leicestershire)
- Attendance: 77,698

The 1998 Football League Cup final was a football match played between Chelsea and Middlesbrough on 29 March 1998 at Wembley Stadium. Chelsea, under new manager Gianluca Vialli, won with two extra time goals and won the UEFA Cup Winners' Cup later that season. Middlesbrough's second consecutive defeat in the final was followed by promotion back to the Premier League after just one season.

Both teams were restricted to shots from distance. This all changed in extra time when Chelsea took control. Frank Sinclair, a villain in the 1994 FA Cup final defeat when conceding a penalty and slipping to allow Mark Hughes to score, became the hero in this match. He started the move that ended with his header finding the corner of the Middlesbrough net to open the scoring. Chelsea's second goal came from Roberto Di Matteo. A corner played into the near post was not cleared by the Boro defence and Di Matteo was able to side foot the ball into the net on the half-volley. Di Matteo had come back to haunt Middlesbrough as he had scored the opening goal when the same sides met in the 1997 FA Cup final the previous season. Once again Chelsea had won 2–0.

== Road to Wembley ==
=== Chelsea ===
Round 3: Chelsea 1–1 Blackburn Rovers

(Chelsea won 4–1 on penalties)

Round 4: Chelsea 2–1 Southampton

Quarter-final: Ipswich Town 2–2 Chelsea

(Chelsea won 4–1 on penalties)

Semi-final, 1st leg: Arsenal 2–1 Chelsea

Semi-final, 2nd leg: Chelsea 3–1 Arsenal

=== Middlesbrough ===
Round 2, 1st leg: Middlesbrough 1–0 Barnet

Round 2, 2nd leg: Barnet 0–2 Middlesbrough

Round 3: Middlesbrough 2–0 Sunderland

Round 4: Middlesbrough 2–1 Bolton Wanderers a.e.t.

Quarter-final: Reading 0–1 Middlesbrough

Semi-final, 1st leg: Liverpool 2–1 Middlesbrough

Semi-final, 2nd leg: Middlesbrough 2–0 Liverpool

== Match facts ==
29 March 1998
15:00

Chelsea	2–0 (a.e.t.)	Middlesbrough
Sinclair 95'; Di Matteo 107'	Report

Wembley Stadium, London
Attendance: 77,698
Referee: Peter Jones (Leicestershire)

Chelsea	Middlesbrough

GK	1	(Netherlands) Ed de Goey
RWB	2	(Romania) Dan Petrescu		(substituted off) 75'
CB	5	(France) Frank Leboeuf	Yellow card
CB	12	(England) Michael Duberry
CB	20	(Jamaica) Frank Sinclair
LWB	14	(England) Graeme Le Saux	Yellow card
CM	16	(Italy) Roberto Di Matteo
CM	11	(England) Dennis Wise (c)	Yellow card
CM	24	(England) Eddie Newton
CF	25	(Italy) Gianfranco Zola
CF	10	(Wales) Mark Hughes	Yellow card	(substituted off) 83'
Substitutes:
GK	13	(England) Kevin Hitchcock
DF	6	(Scotland) Steve Clarke		(substituted on) 75'
FW	19	(Norway) Tore André Flo		(substituted on) 83'
Manager:
(Italy) Gianluca Vialli

GK	1	(Australia) Mark Schwarzer
RB	2	(Italy) Gianluca Festa
CB	4	(England) Steve Vickers
CB	5	(England) Nigel Pearson (c)
LB	3	(Slovakia) Vladimír Kinder
RM	10	(England) Paul Merson
CM	6	(England) Robbie Mustoe
CM	7	(England) Neil Maddison		(substituted off) 102'
LM	11	(Republic of Ireland) Andy Townsend	Yellow card
CF	8	(Colombia) Hamilton Ricard		(substituted off) 65'
CF	9	(Italy) Marco Branca
Substitutes:
DF	12	(Republic of Ireland) Curtis Fleming
FW	13	(Denmark) Mikkel Beck		(substituted on) 102'
MF	14	(England) Paul Gascoigne	Yellow card	(substituted on) 65'
Manager:
(England) Bryan Robson
