= Roberto Di Matteo =

Italian football player and manager (born 1970)

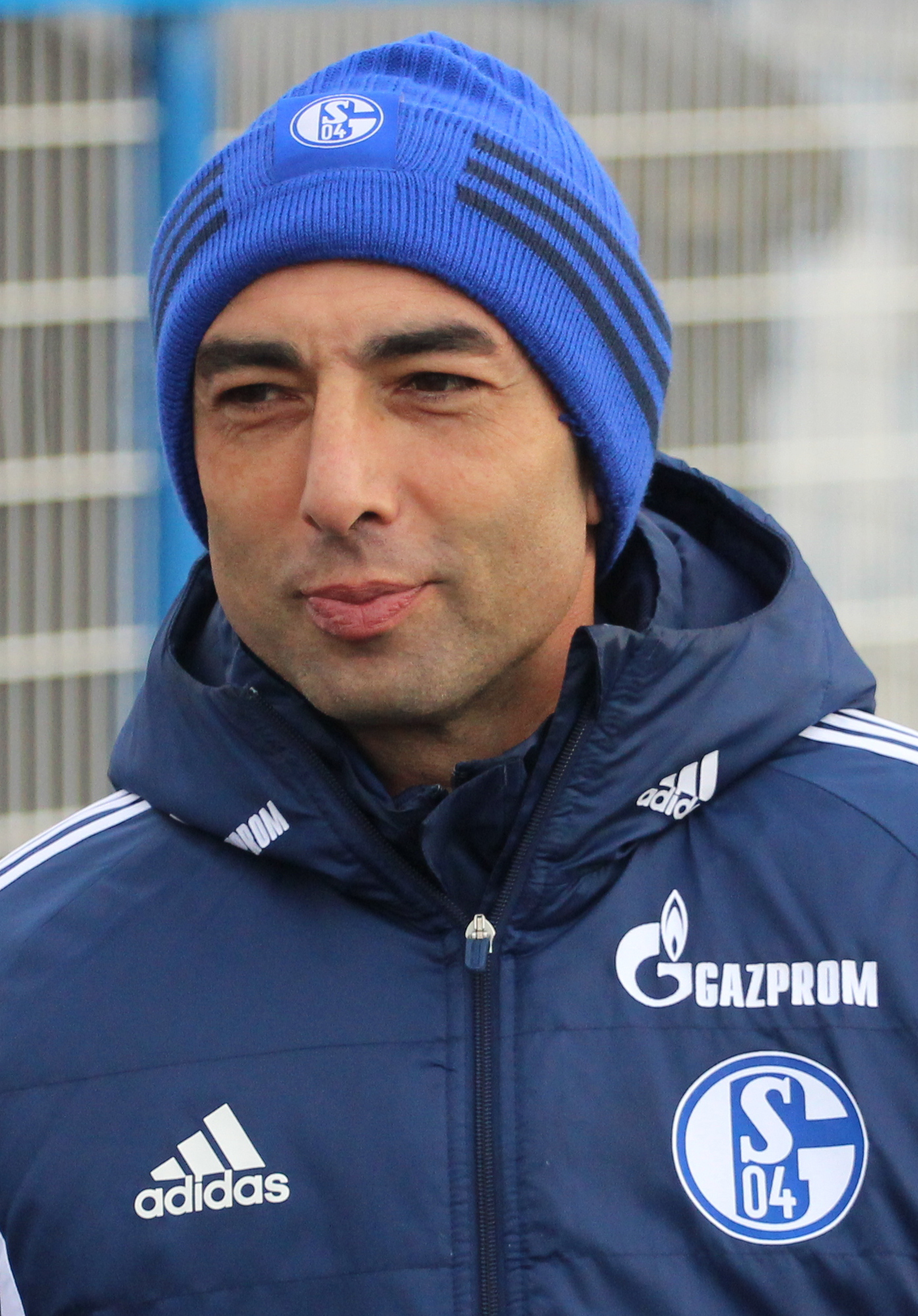
- Di Matteo in 2015

Personal information
- Full name: Roberto Di Matteo
- Date of birth: 29 May 1970 (age 56)
- Place of birth: Schaffhausen, Switzerland
- Height: 1.78 m (5 ft 10 in)
- Position: Midfielder

Senior career*
| Years | Team | Apps | (Gls) |
| 1988–1991 | Schaffhausen | 50 | (2) |
| 1991–1992 | Zürich | 34 | (6) |
| 1992–1993 | Aarau | 33 | (1) |
| 1993–1996 | Lazio | 87 | (7) |
| 1996–2002 | Chelsea | 119 | (15) |
| Total | | 323 | (31) |

International career
| 1994–1998 | Italy | 34 | (2) |

Managerial career
- 2008–2009: Milton Keynes Dons
- 2009–2011: West Bromwich Albion
- 2012: Chelsea
- 2014–2015: Schalke 04
- 2016: Aston Villa
- * Club domestic league appearances and goals

Roberto Di Matteo (Italian pronunciation: [roˈbɛrto di matˈtɛːo]; born 29 May 1970) is a professional football manager and former player.

A midfielder, he played for Swiss clubs Schaffhausen, Zürich and Aarau early in his career. After winning the league title with Aarau in 1992–93, he joined Serie A team Lazio where he played under managers Dino Zoff and Zdeněk Zeman. After three seasons at Lazio, he joined Chelsea in 1996 for a £4.9 million fee, a club record at the time. After six seasons there, he retired from professional football in February 2002 at the age of 31 following injury problems. Born in Switzerland to Italian parents, he chose to play for Italy, earning 34 caps and scoring two goals. He represented them at UEFA Euro 1996 and the 1998 FIFA World Cup.

Di Matteo began his managerial career with Milton Keynes Dons, whom he took to the League One playoffs in 2008–09 before leaving to return West Bromwich Albion to the Premier League. As caretaker manager of Chelsea, he steered the club to double title success, winning both the FA Cup and the club's first UEFA Champions League title in 2012, but was dismissed later that year. He coached Schalke 04 for seven months in 2014–15 and Aston Villa for four months in 2016.

== Club career ==
=== Early career ===
Born in Schaffhausen, Switzerland, to Italian parents from Abruzzo, Di Matteo began his career with Swiss club Schaffhausen, before joining Aarau in 1991. He won the Swiss Nationalliga A with Aarau in 1993.

=== Lazio ===
Di Matteo signed for Lazio in the summer of 1993 on a free transfer. He became a regular starting-11 member of the Lazio side in midfield under managers Dino Zoff and later Zdeněk Zeman, and he made his debut for the Italy national team during his three seasons with the Rome club. Under Zeman, he was frequently deployed in the central midfield role, in which he was required to aid the team defensively – thanks to his formation as a sweeper during his youth – as well as offensively and creatively. During his time at the club, he developed into one of the top two-way midfielders in Italy.

=== Chelsea ===
Di Matteo scored the winner against Middlesbrough on his home debut for Chelsea. His passing ability and accurate long-distance shooting saw him become one of the driving forces of Chelsea's resurgence in the late 1990s, along with several other Italian players. He contributed nine goals in his first season, including long-range efforts against both Tottenham Hotspur and Wimbledon. He helped the club finish sixth place in the league, their highest placing since 1989–90, and reach the 1997 FA Cup final at Wembley. Within 42 seconds of the kick-off of the final against Middlesbrough, Di Matteo scored the opening goal from 30 yards and Chelsea won 2–0. Di Matteo's goal was the fastest in a Wembley FA Cup final until the record was broken by Louis Saha for Everton in 2009.

The following season Di Matteo again proved his worth to the team, contributing ten goals and numerous assists, as Chelsea went on to claim the Football League Cup and the Cup Winners' Cup, their first European honour since 1971. In the League Cup final, again against Middlesbrough, Di Matteo scored the second goal in a 2–0 win. Di Matteo played in midfield next to Gus Poyet, Dennis Wise and Dan Petrescu in the 1998–99 season as Chelsea finished third. During the 1999–2000 season Di Matteo was sidelined by injury but returned late in the season to score a handful of crucial goals, including his third Cup-winning goal at Wembley, once again in the FA Cup. In a dour match, Di Matteo capitalised on an error by Aston Villa goalkeeper David James to score the winner in the 72nd minute, handing Chelsea their fourth major trophy in three years. This led Di Matteo to comment on the old Wembley Stadium saying "It's a shame they're tearing the old place down it has been a very lucky ground for me".

Early into the 2000–01 season, Di Matteo sustained a triple leg fracture in a UEFA Cup tie against Swiss side St. Gallen and did not play for the next eighteen months. He gave up on hopes of returning from this injury in February 2002 and retired at the age of 31. In his six years at Chelsea, Di Matteo made 175 appearances and scored 26 goals.

== International career ==
Di Matteo made his Italy debut under Arrigo Sacchi on 16 November 1994 in the Stadio La Favorita in Palermo. He came on as a 55th-minute substitute for Demetrio Albertini as Italy lost 2–1 to Croatia in qualification for UEFA Euro 1996. He made his first start in his second cap, a friendly 3–1 victory over Turkey on 21 December 1994 in the Stadio Adriatico in Pescara. Di Matteo played two of Italy's group matches in UEFA Euro 1996, against Russia and Germany. His first goal was scored on his 23rd cap, in qualification for the 1998 FIFA World Cup, on 30 April 1997 in a 3–0 win against Poland in Naples. Di Matteo only scored one more goal for Italy, in a friendly win over Slovakia on 28 January 1998. He was a member of Italy's FIFA World Cup team in 1998 and played two of their group games, against Chile and Cameroon. The match against Cameroon in Montpellier was his last game for Italy; in total he made 34 caps for Italy between 1994 and 1998, scoring 2 goals.

== Style of play ==
Under his Lazio managers Zeman and Dino Zoff, Di Matteo was frequently deployed in the central holding midfield role in the team's 4–3–3 formation, in which he was required to aid the team defensively, owing to his formation both as a sweeper and as a centre-back in a zonal defence during his youth in Switzerland. He was also important in helping his team offensively and creatively, functioning as a deep-lying playmaker for Lazio under Zeman, and helping to set the tempo of his team's play and create chances through his precise passing range, technique, control, finesse, composure, and vision; as such his role was often likened to that of a metodista ("centre-half," in Italian football jargon), due to his ability to dictate play in midfield as well as assist his team defensively.

During his stint in Rome, Di Matteo was regarded as one of the best two-way midfielders in Italy, and was also later considered to be one of the top midfielders in the Premier League during his time in England, becoming a key player for Chelsea in the late 1990s. Di Matteo was also capable of playing in a more offensive midfield roles, due to his ability to make forward surging runs, as well as his accurate long–range shot.

== Managerial career ==
=== Milton Keynes Dons ===
On 2 July 2008, Di Matteo succeeded former England midfielder Paul Ince as manager of Milton Keynes Dons on a one-year contract, after Ince took the manager's job at Premier League club Blackburn Rovers. A club statement by the Dons said that both Di Matteo and the club were "young, ambitious and hungry to succeed". On 26 November that year, Di Matteo took former Chelsea teammate and Norwegian international striker Tore André Flo out of retirement by signing him on a contract until the end of the season. In his only season at Stadium MK, Di Matteo led his team to third place in League One behind Leicester City and Peterborough United. They then lost a play-off semi-final on penalties to Scunthorpe United, with Flo missing the decisive penalty in sudden death.

=== West Bromwich Albion ===
Di Matteo was appointed manager of West Bromwich Albion on 30 June 2009, shortly after their relegation from the Premier League and the exit of former manager Tony Mowbray to Celtic. His selection was unanimous among the club's board. In his first season, the team finished second in the Championship, behind Newcastle United, and won automatic promotion to the Premier League on 10 April with three games remaining after defeating Doncaster Rovers 3–2.

On the opening day of the 2010–11 Premier League season on 14 August 2010, Di Matteo paid a return visit to Stamford Bridge as head coach of West Bromwich Albion. He was well received by the home fans, but saw his side lose 6–0 to Chelsea. Better results in following matches led to the best start in a Premier League season by the club, and Di Matteo was also named Premier League Manager of the Month for September 2010. During December 2010 and January 2011, the club had a period of poor form, winning only two of ten matches. After a 0–3 defeat to Manchester City on 5 February 2011, he was relieved of his duties with immediate effect, and first-team coach Michael Appleton was appointed caretaker manager. West Bromwich Albion finished the season in eleventh position.

=== Chelsea ===
==== 2011–12 season ====
Di Matteo was appointed assistant to André Villas-Boas, the new manager of Chelsea, on 29 June 2011. On 4 March 2012, following the dismissal of Villas-Boas, Di Matteo became caretaker manager of Chelsea until the end of the season. Shortly after his appointment, Di Matteo brought in former Chelsea teammate Eddie Newton to work as his assistant. Di Matteo started his stewardship of Chelsea in winning form, with victories over Birmingham City, in a fifth round FA Cup match; Stoke City in a Premier League fixture; and Napoli in the last 16 second leg match in the UEFA Champions League, winning 4–1 to overturn the deficit in the first leg which Villas-Boas' Chelsea had lost 3–1.

Di Matteo continued his form with Chelsea, by beating Tottenham Hotspur in the FA Cup semi-final 5–1 at Wembley and Benfica in the Champions League quarter-finals. On 24 April 2012, Di Matteo led Chelsea to a 3–2 aggregate win over holders Barcelona in the UEFA Champions League semi-final, winning 1–0 in the first leg at Stamford Bridge, and following this with a 2–2 draw in the second leg at the Camp Nou despite having captain John Terry sent off in the first half. On 5 May, Chelsea won 2–1 against Liverpool in the 2012 FA Cup final at Wembley Stadium, to win their first trophy in the 2011–12 season.

On 19 May 2012, Di Matteo guided Chelsea to victory in the 2012 UEFA Champions League final, defeating Bayern Munich at the Allianz Arena. The match had ended 1–1 after extra time with Chelsea coming out victorious in the penalty shootout. This was Chelsea's first Champions League title, and qualified them for the 2012–13 Champions League, in place of London rivals Tottenham Hotspur. With this win Chelsea also became the first London club to win the Champions League.

==== 2012–13 season ====
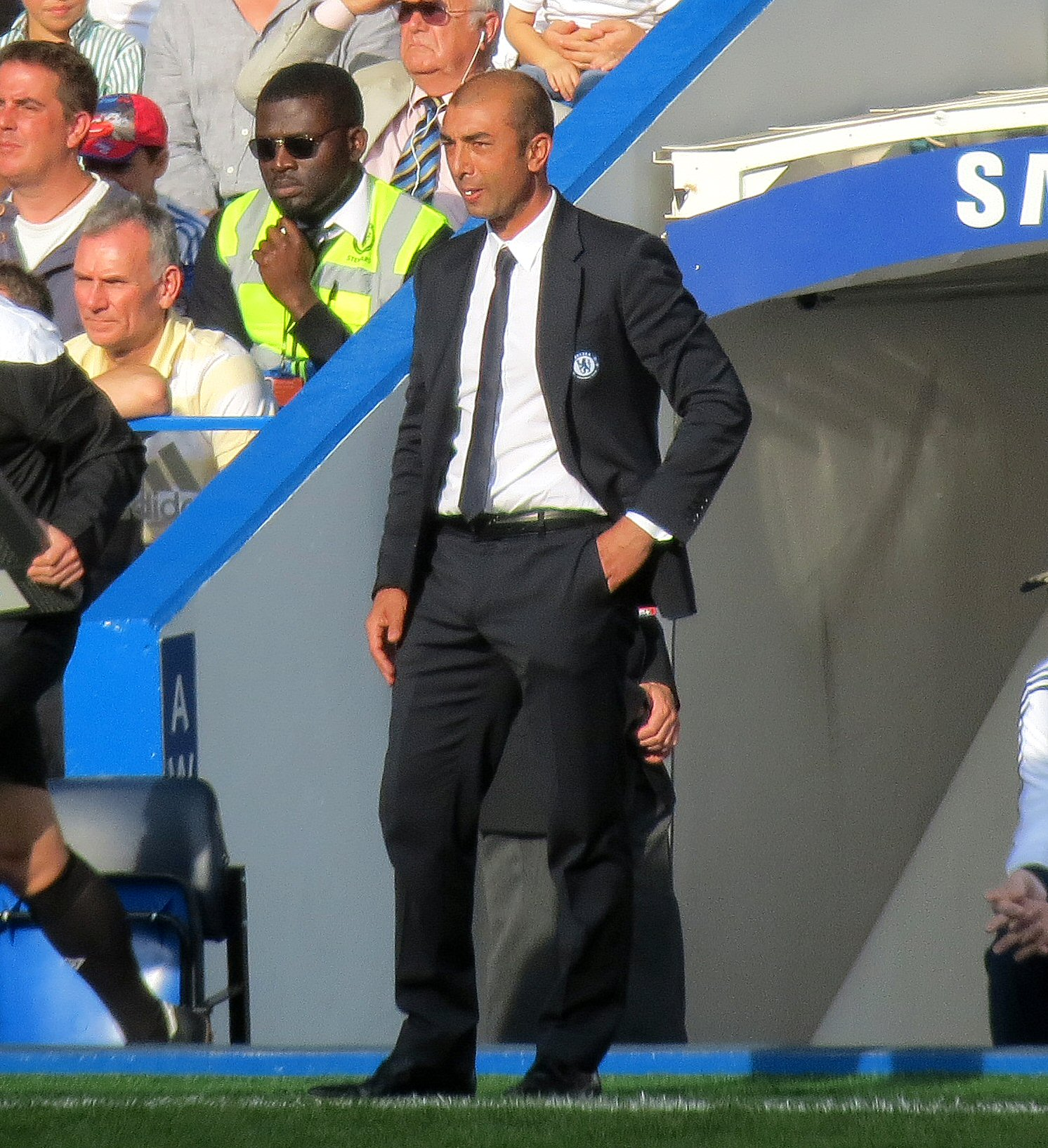
Di Matteo managing Chelsea in 2012

On 13 June 2012, Chelsea announced that Di Matteo had been appointed manager and first-team coach on a permanent basis signing a two-year contract with the club. Chief executive Ron Gourlay said: 'Although he (Di Matteo) has set the bar very high in the short time he has been in charge, we know that Roberto is the right man to lead Chelsea onto further success.' Gourlay added: 'We are already looking forward to the 2012–13 season which kicks off when Roberto, his staff and players return for pre-season.' Chelsea lost in the 2012 FA Community Shield to Manchester City 2–3. His team started the 2012–13 Premier League well, with victories against Wigan Athletic, Reading, and Newcastle United. They lost the 2012 UEFA Super Cup 4–1 to Atlético Madrid in Monaco on 1 September. The good early season form continued with four successive Premier League wins against Stoke City, Arsenal, Norwich City and Tottenham Hotspur.

In the 2012–13 UEFA Champions League, Chelsea drew 2–2 with Juventus and beat Danish club Nordsjælland 4–0 away. Their form declined after this, however, losing to Shakhtar Donetsk in the Champions League and to Manchester United at home in the Premier League. Chelsea's chances of advancing through their Champions League group were raised with a 3–2 home victory against leaders Shakhtar, but on 21 November 2012, Di Matteo was dismissed following their 3–0 away loss to Juventus in the Champions League, which all but eliminated them from the competition, then later continued with their poor form in the domestic league. Di Matteo had lasted just eight months as manager of Chelsea despite winning two major trophies, causing the decision to be controversial with many pundits and club fans. Later that day, Rafael Benítez was brought in as Chelsea's interim manager until the end of the season.

In November 2013, it was reported that Di Matteo was still being paid £130,000-a-week by Chelsea because the two parties had never agreed on a pay-off settlement and that he would continue to be paid in full until June 2014 unless he took another job before then.

=== Schalke 04 ===
On 7 October 2014, Di Matteo was hired as the successor to Jens Keller at Schalke 04. At that point, Schalke sat 11th in the Bundesliga and had already been eliminated from the DFB-Pokal. Di Matteo was the third Italian head coach in the history of the Bundesliga, preceded by Giovanni Trapattoni and Nevio Scala.

He won his first match 2–0 against Hertha Berlin on 18 October, with goals from Klaas-Jan Huntelaar and Julian Draxler. Schalke advanced from their Champions League group, with Max Meyer scoring the only goal in their final group match away to NK Maribor on 10 December. On 10 March 2015, Schalke defeated Real Madrid 4–3 in Madrid. However, Schalke lost 2–0 in the first leg on 18 February and 5–4 on aggregate. He resigned on 26 May 2015 after the team qualified for the UEFA Europa League by finishing sixth, following a run of two wins in ten matches which cost them a place in the Champions League.

=== Aston Villa ===
On 2 June 2016, Di Matteo was appointed the manager of newly relegated Championship club Aston Villa, working under the new chairman Tony Xia and Keith Wyness. Di Matteo's former Chelsea teammate Steve Clarke was appointed as his assistant on the same day. On 3 October 2016, Di Matteo was dismissed as manager after a string of poor results culminating in a 2–0 defeat at Preston North End.

=== Jeonbuk Hyundai Motors ===
On 4 January 2023, Di Matteo was appointed as a technical advisor to the South Korean club Jeonbuk Hyundai Motors.

== Personal life ==
Di Matteo is married to Zoe, with whom he has three children.

In 2005, he appeared on the MTV show Footballers' Cribs, where he spoke about his injury and subsequent physiotherapy.

Ruud Gullit, his manager at Chelsea, wrote that Di Matteo is a cosmopolitan who speaks Italian, German and English.

== Playing statistics ==
=== Club ===
Appearances and goals by club, season and competition
| Club | Season | League | | | National cup | | League cup | | Europe | | Other | | Total | |
| Club | Season | Division | Apps | Goals | Apps | Goals | Apps | Goals | Apps | Goals | Apps | Goals | Apps | Goals |
|---|---|---|---|---|---|---|---|---|---|---|---|---|---|---|
| Chelsea | 1996–97 | Premier League | 34 | 7 | 7 | 2 | 3 | 0 | 0 | 0 | — | | 44 | 9 |
| Chelsea | 1997–98 | Premier League | 30 | 4 | 1 | 0 | 4 | 3 | 8 (Note: Appearances in UEFA Cup Winners' Cup) | 3 | 1 (Note: Appearance in FA Charity Shield) | 0 | 44 | 10 |
| Chelsea | 1998–99 | Premier League | 30 | 2 | 6 | 1 | 2 | 0 | 7 | 0 | 1 (Note: Appearance in UEFA Super Cup) | 0 | 46 | 3 |
| Chelsea | 1999–2000 | Premier League | 18 | 2 | 3 | 2 | 1 | 0 | 9 (Note: Appearances in UEFA Champions League) | 0 | — | | 31 | 4 |
| Chelsea | 2000–01 | Premier League | 7 | 0 | 0 | 0 | 0 | 0 | 2 (Note: Appearances in UEFA Cup) | 0 | 1 | 0 | 10 | 0 |
| Chelsea | Total | | 119 | 15 | 17 | 5 | 10 | 3 | 26 | 3 | 3 | 0 | 175 | 26 |

=== International ===
Appearances and goals by national team and year
| National team | Year | Apps | Goals |
|---|---|---|---|
| Italy | 1994 | 2 | 0 |
| Italy | 1995 | 8 | 0 |
| Italy | 1996 | 8 | 0 |
| Italy | 1997 | 11 | 1 |
| Italy | 1998 | 5 | 1 |
| Total | | 34 | 2 |

Scores and results list Italy's goal tally first, score column indicates score after each Di Matteo goal.

List of international goals scored by Roberto Di Matteo
| No. | Date | Venue | Opponent | Score | Result | Competition |
|---|---|---|---|---|---|---|
| 1 | 30 April 1997 | Stadio San Paolo, Naples, Italy | Poland | 1–0 | 3–0 | 1998 FIFA World Cup qualifier |
| 2 | 28 January 1998 | Stadio Angelo Massimino, Catania, Italy | Slovakia | 3–0 | 3–0 | Friendly |

== Managerial statistics ==
As of 3 October 2016

Managerial record by team and tenure
| Team | From | To | Record | | | | | Ref |
| Team | From | To | P | W | D | L | Win % | Ref |
|---|---|---|---|---|---|---|---|---|
| Milton Keynes Dons | 2 July 2008 | 30 June 2009 | 52 | 27 | 11 | 14 | 51.92 | |
| West Bromwich Albion | 30 June 2009 | 6 February 2011 | 83 | 40 | 19 | 24 | 48.19 | |
| Chelsea | 4 March 2012 | 21 November 2012 | 42 | 24 | 9 | 9 | 57.14 | |
| Schalke 04 | 7 October 2014 | 26 May 2015 | 33 | 14 | 7 | 12 | 42.42 | |
| Aston Villa | 2 June 2016 | 3 October 2016 | 12 | 1 | 7 | 4 | 8.33 | |
| Total | | | 222 | 106 | 53 | 63 | 47.75 | — |

== Honours ==
=== Player ===
Aarau

- Nationalliga A: 1992–93

Chelsea

- FA Cup: 1996–97, 1999–2000
- Football League Cup: 1997–98
- FA Charity Shield: 2000
- UEFA Cup Winners' Cup: 1997–98
- UEFA Super Cup: 1998

=== Manager ===
West Bromwich Albion

- Football League Championship runner-up: 2009–10

Chelsea

- FA Cup: 2011–12
- UEFA Champions League: 2011–12

Individual

- Premier League Manager of the Month: September 2010
- Swiss Sports Awards Coach of the Year: 2012
- LMA FA Cup Manager of the Year: 2012
- League One Manager of the Month: November 2008

== See also ==
- List of Italy international footballers born outside Italy
- List of UEFA Champions League winning managers
- List of FA Cup winning managers
