= Stephen Broad =

English footballer

Personal information
- Date of birth: 10 June 1980 (age 46)
- Place of birth: Epsom, England
- Position: Defender

Youth career
- 1994–1999: Chelsea

Senior career*
Years	Team	Apps	(Gls)
1999–2001	Chelsea	0	(0)
1999–2000	→ Hayes (loan)	3	(0)
2001	→ Southend United (loan)	10	(0)
2001–2003	Southend United	47	(2)
2003–200?	Kingstonian		
2006	Corinthian-Casuals		
2006	Sutton United		
2006–200?	Kingstonian		
- * Club domestic league appearances and goals

Stephen Broad (born 10 June 1980) is an English footballer, who played as a defender in the Football League for Southend United. He has also played for non-League clubs, Hayes, Kingstonian, Corinthian-Casuals and Sutton United.

== Football career ==
As a youth, Broad played for Chelsea for five years rising through the youth ranks before captaining Chelsea's reserve side, which included John Terry. He joined Conference National side, Hayes on loan in 1999. He then joined Southend United on loan in 2001.

He made his debut for Southend United in Third Division, in the 1–1 away draw against Chesterfield on 31 March 2001. He joined Kingstonian in June 2003 alongside Mark Beard.

Broad rejoined Kingstonian in October 2006, after making a few appearances at Corinthian-Casuals and Sutton United during the 2006–07 season.

== After football ==
Broad decided to give up full-time football in 2003, and after working as a taxi driver in Essex now works supporting children with autism. In 2016, he appeared as a contestant on Countdown, he also appeared as a contestant on Ken Bruce's BBC Radio 2 segment PopMaster in 2022.
