= Jody Morris =

English football coach and former player

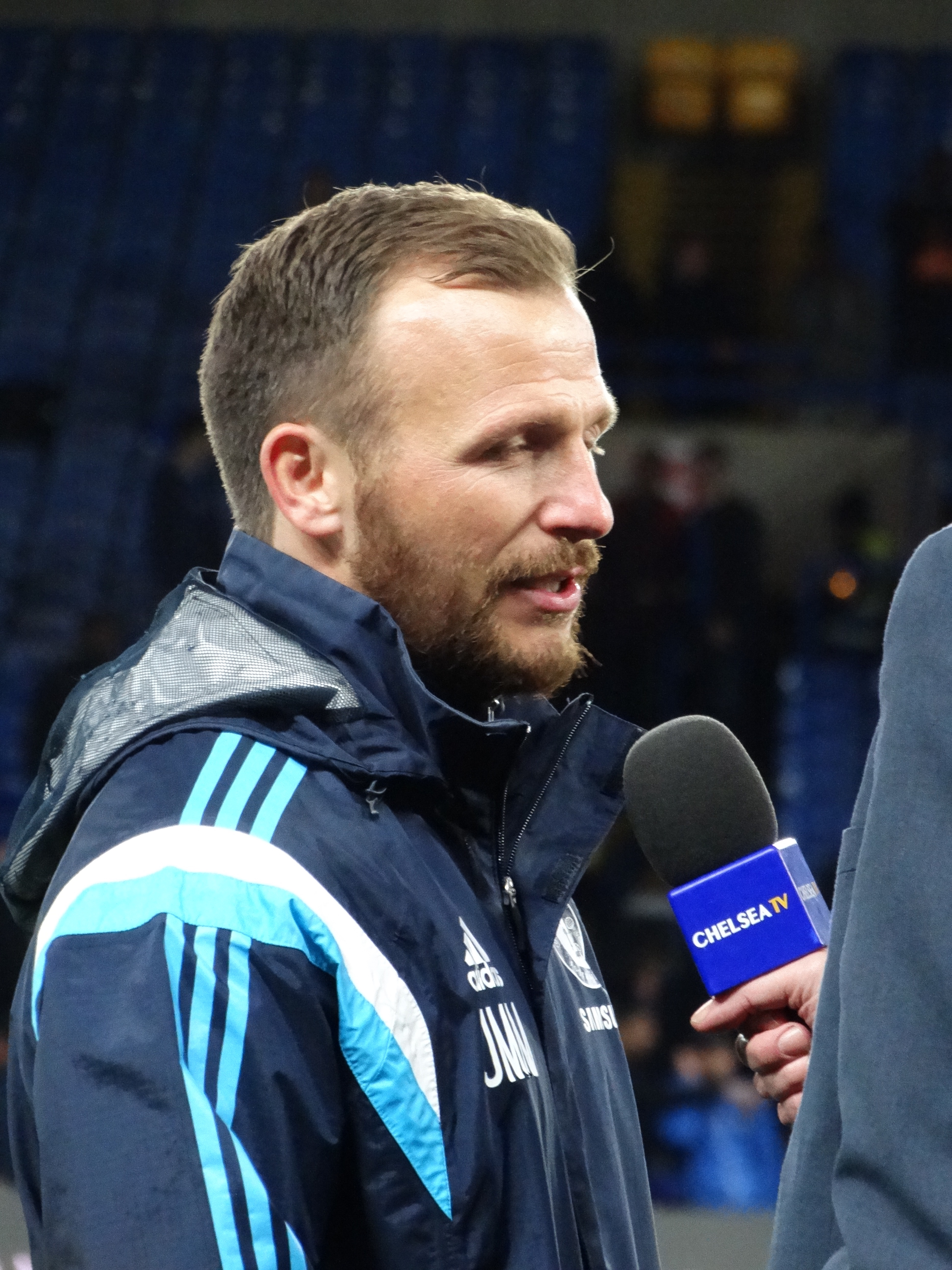
- Morris in 2015

Personal information
- Full name: Jody Steven Morris
- Date of birth: 22 December 1978 (age 47)
- Place of birth: Hammersmith, London, England
- Height: 5 ft 5 in (1.65 m)
- Position: Midfielder

Youth career
- 1993–1996: Chelsea

Senior career*
Years	Team	Apps	(Gls)
1996–2003	Chelsea	124	(5)
2003–2004	Leeds United	12	(0)
2004	Rotherham United	10	(1)
2004–2007	Millwall	65	(5)
2008–2012	St Johnstone	104	(4)
2012–2013	Bristol City	4	(0)
Total		319	(15)

International career
1994–1995	England U16	11	(0)
1997	England U20	4	(0)
1996–1999	England U21	7	(0)

Managerial career
- 2023: Swindon Town
- * Club domestic league appearances and goals

Jody Steven Morris (born 22 December 1978) is an English professional football coach and former player. He was most recently the head coach of EFL League Two club Swindon Town.

As a midfielder, Morris played for Chelsea, Leeds United, Rotherham United, Millwall, St Johnstone and Bristol City. He won several trophies at Chelsea, including the UEFA Super Cup in 1998 and FA Cup in 2000.

After retiring from playing, Morris became a youth coach at Chelsea's academy. He was then named assistant manager to Frank Lampard at Derby County in 2018 and Chelsea in 2019.

== Club career ==
=== Chelsea ===
Morris came through the youth ranks at Chelsea, alongside his close friend John Terry. He became the youngest player to ever play in the Premier League for Chelsea when he debuted at the age of 17 years and 43 days in the home game against Middlesbrough on 4 February 1996 and was named Chelsea's Young Player of the Year for 1996–97.

While at Chelsea, he made 124 league appearances and was a late substitute in the 2000 FA Cup final, receiving a winner's medal. In April 2000, Chelsea won 3–1 against Barcelona in the UEFA Champions League; Morris was later described by Xavi as one of his toughest opponents. Morris played 173 times for Chelsea across all competitions. He was also briefly made captain of the club by manager Gianluca Vialli.

However, when Claudio Ranieri took over from Vialli as Chelsea boss, Morris' first team opportunities diminished, and he was linked with a host of clubs including being reunited with his former England under-21 manager Peter Taylor at Leicester. Morris never regained his position as a first team regular at Chelsea, finding himself behind players, such as Roberto Di Matteo, Dennis Wise, Didier Deschamps and Emmanuel Petit. He was offered a new five-year contract with Chelsea in 2003, but chose to turn it down.

=== Leeds, Rotherham, and Millwall ===
Graeme Souness offered him the chance of regular first team football at Blackburn Rovers and they shook hands on a deal, but it fell through. He joined Leeds United instead, but made only 12 appearances for the club. After a short spell at Rotherham United, where he scored once against Stoke City, he joined Millwall in 2004.

Morris made 70 first-team appearances for Millwall, before fracturing his cheekbone, and then suffered cruciate knee ligament damage at Derby County on his comeback game, towards the end of the 2005–06 season. He signed a new one-year deal in June 2006, with the club having an additional one-year option. In June 2007, Morris was released by Millwall. Morris then had a brief trial period at Charlton Athletic, and trained with League Two side Brentford, in a bid to earn himself a contract at the West London club.

=== St Johnstone and Bristol City ===
Morris signed for Scottish side St Johnstone, then in the First Division, on a short-term deal at the end of February 2008, playing under Derek McInnes, his former teammate at Millwall during the 2006–07 season. He scored a goal on his debut against Dundee. He played in the club's Scottish Cup semi-final defeat to Rangers in April 2008 but was one of two Saints players to miss in the penalty shoot-out. After a successful five months at McDiarmid Park, Morris signed a two-year deal with the Perth side at the end of the season. He was part of the title-winning team that in May 2009 gained promotion to the Scottish Premier League after a seven-year absence. Morris signed a new contract with Saints in October 2009, while Derek McInnes praised his influence on the squad. After McInnes left St Johnstone to manage Bristol City in October 2011, Morris assisted caretaker manager Alec Cleland with the coaching of the squad.

Morris signed a one-year contract with Bristol City in June 2012, reuniting him with Derek McInnes. Morris had his contract terminated with Bristol City on 31 January 2013 having only made four league appearances for the club.

== Coaching career ==
=== Chelsea Academy ===
In the 2013–14 season Morris returned to Chelsea, initially to help coach the Under-21 squad. He was then an assistant coach of the Under-18 team, and moved to head coach of the team for the 2016–17 season. The team won the FA Youth Cup for the fifth successive time in 2018. At Chelsea, Morris coached possession-based attacking football, and used several formations including the 3–4–3, 3–5–2, 4–3–3 and 4–4–2. In his two seasons as head coach, Chelsea's Under-18s won 59 matches and lost 5 times. They won the treble in 2016–17 and the quadruple in 2017–18.

=== Derby County and Chelsea ===
In May 2018, Morris became assistant to former Chelsea teammate Frank Lampard at Derby County. Their first game in charge was a 2–1 win over Reading, thanks to a last-minute winner from Tom Lawrence. On 25 September, Derby knocked Premier League team Manchester United out of the EFL Cup at Old Trafford on penalties, following a 2–2 draw. At the end of the season, Derby qualified for the Championship play-offs after coming sixth in the league. In the semi-finals, they overturned a 1–0 loss at home to Leeds United in the first leg with a 4–2 win at Elland Road in the second that gave them a 4–3 aggregate win. This took them to the final against Aston Villa, which Derby lost 2–1.

Morris returned to Chelsea in July 2019 as part of the first-team coaching staff following the appointment of Lampard as head coach. They finished 4th in the Premier League and qualified for the UEFA Champions League. The following season, Morris left Chelsea in January 2021 after Lampard was sacked.

=== Swindon Town ===
On 31 January 2023, Morris was appointed manager of Swindon Town on a two-and-a-half-year contract. On 1 May 2023, it was announced that he had been sacked by Swindon Town after just four wins from 18.

== Managerial statistics ==
As of match played 29 April 2023

Managerial record by club and tenure
Team	From	To	Record				
Team	From	To	M	W	D	L	Win %
Swindon Town	31 January 2023	1 May 2023	18	4	4	10	22.22
Total			18	4	4	10	22.22

== Personal life ==
Morris grew up in Hammersmith, London, a mile-and-a-half away from Chelsea's Stamford Bridge. His skill as a footballer was evident at a young age, with fellow player Rio Ferdinand dubbing him "the best schoolboy footballer in London".

In September 2001, Morris, Chelsea teammates John Terry, Frank Lampard and Eiður Guðjohnsen, and Leicester City's Frank Sinclair, were drunk and unruly in a Heathrow Airport hotel containing many Americans left stranded by the September 11 attacks. The Chelsea quartet were each fined two weeks' wages, totalling around £100,000, which was donated to the 9/11 relief efforts.

In August 2002, Morris, along with fellow footballers John Terry and Des Byrne, was cleared of a charge of affray in relation to an incident at a nightclub. In 2006, Morris drove down a one-way street the wrong way while three times over the drink-drive limit. This resulted in a driving ban for four years, 80 hours of community service and a two-year suspended jail sentence.

== Honours ==
=== Player ===
Chelsea

- FA Cup: 1999–2000
- FA Charity Shield: 2000
- UEFA Cup Winners' Cup: 1997–98
- UEFA Super Cup: 1998

=== Manager ===
Chelsea U18

- FA Youth Cup: 2016–17, 2017–18
- Under-18 Premier League: 2016–17, 2017–18
- Under-18 Premier League Cup: 2017–18
- Premier League National: 2017–18
