= Kevin Hitchcock =

English footballer and coach

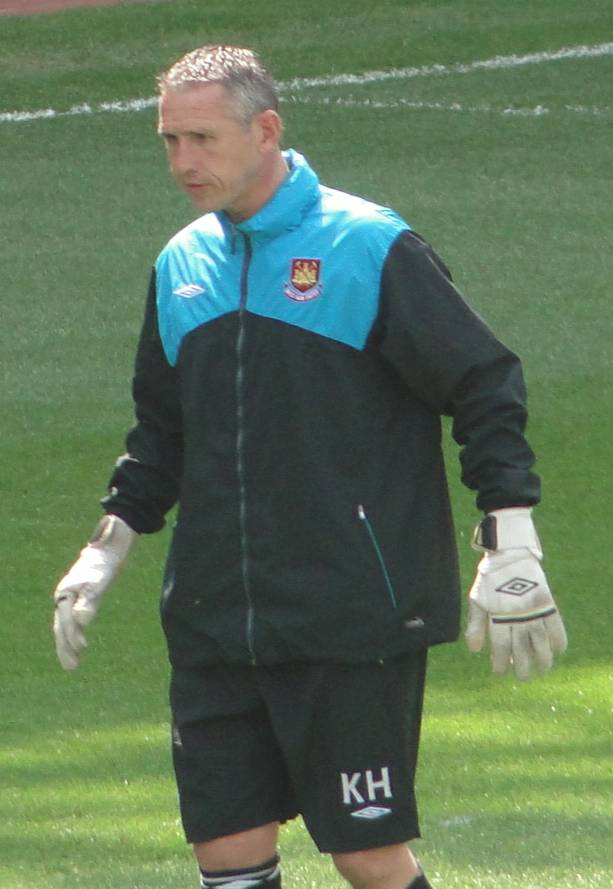
- Hitchcock at West Ham, April 2010

Personal information
- Date of birth: 5 October 1962 (age 64)
- Place of birth: Canning Town, England
- Height: 6 ft 1 in (1.85 m)
- Position: Goalkeeper

Team information
- Current team: New England Revolution (goalkeeping coach)

Senior career*
| Years | Team | Apps | (Gls) |
| –1983 | Barking | | |
| 1983–1984 | Nottingham Forest | 0 | (0) |
| 1984 | → Mansfield Town (loan) | 14 | (0) |
| 1984–1988 | Mansfield Town | 168 | (0) |
| 1988–2001 | Chelsea | 96 | (0) |
| 1990 | → Northampton Town (loan) | 17 | (0) |
| 1993 | → West Ham United (loan) | 0 | (0) |
| 2001–2004 | Watford | 0 | (0) |
| Total | | 295 | (0) |
- * Club domestic league appearances and goals

Kevin Hitchcock (born 5 October 1962) is an English football coach and former professional footballer who is goalkeeping coach of MLS side New England Revolution.

As a player, he was a goalkeeper who made nearly 300 league appearances, notably playing in the Premier League for Chelsea between 1988 and 2001. He also had spells in the top flight for Nottingham Forest, West Ham United and Watford that yielded no appearances. He played the rest of his career in the Football League for Mansfield Town and Northampton Town.

Since his retirement he was worked at numerous clubs as a goalkeeping coach, including Blackburn Rovers, Manchester City, West Ham United, Fulham, Queens Park Rangers, Birmingham City and Chennaiyin FC.

== Playing career ==
Hitchcock was born in Canning Town, London, and played non-league football for Barking, having been on Chelsea Youth books for 1978/9 but playing just 2 games plus 1 substitution appearance in their Junior League team, before being released at the end of the season. He joined Nottingham Forest in 1983 for a fee of £15,000. He spent time on loan to Mansfield Town in 1984, and joined the club for a fee of £140,000 at the end of the 1983–84 season without having played for Forest's first team. He stayed with Mansfield for four seasons, helping the club to promotion from the Fourth Division in 1986, and played a major part in their 1987 Football League Trophy victory against Bristol City, saving two penalties in the shootout.

Hitchcock joined Chelsea for £250,000 in March 1988, and made his debut on 26 March in a 1–0 defeat to Southampton. He remained at Chelsea until 2001 and made 96 league appearances, 4 of which were from the bench. His final appearance for Chelsea came against Tottenham in May 1999. Bad luck with injuries left him stuck behind numerous other goalkeepers in the pecking order which was one of the main reasons for him making so few appearances in all that time at the club. He left Chelsea in 2001 to take up the post of goalkeeping coach at Watford, who had just appointed Gianluca Vialli, late of Chelsea, as their new manager.

== Coaching career ==
He left Watford in 2004 to link up with former Chelsea teammate Mark Hughes as goalkeeping coach at Blackburn Rovers, following him to Manchester City in 2008. On 19 December 2009, he left the club alongside Mark Hughes

In March 2010, he was appointed goalkeeping coach at West Ham United, replacing Luděk Mikloško, but as of June 2010 he left the club along with Steve Clarke. In August 2010 he was appointed Fulham's primary goalkeeping coach and he left Fulham in June 2011 with the arrival of new Fulham manager Martin Jol, who appointed Hans Segers as his new goalkeeping coach. In January 2012 Hitchcock linked up, once again, with former Chelsea teammate Mark Hughes at Queens Park Rangers to take up the post of goalkeeping coach. He left the club in 2015 when a contract renewal was not offered.

In December 2016, Hitchcock was appointed goalkeeping coach at Birmingham City by new manager and former teammate Gianfranco Zola. He remained with the club under Zola's successors Harry Redknapp and Steve Cotterill, but left when Cotterill was sacked in March 2018 with the team in the relegation zone.

In July 2018, he was appointed as a goalkeeping coach at Indian Super League club Chennaiyin FC, working under John Gregory.

On 30 April 2019, Hitchcock moved to MLS to become the goalkeeping coach at New England Revolution.

== Personal life ==
Hitchcock's son, Tom, also played football professionally as a forward.

== Honours ==
Mansfield Town

- Associate Members' Cup: 1986–87

Chelsea

- FA Cup: 1996–97
- Football League Cup: 1997–98
- UEFA Cup Winners' Cup: 1997–98
- UEFA Super Cup: 1998

Individual

- PFA Team of the Year: 1987–88 Third Division
