= 1997–98 Football League Cup =

League Cup, Coca-Cola Cup

Tournament details
- Country: England; Wales
- Teams: 92

Final positions
- Champions: Chelsea (2nd title)
- Runners-up: Middlesbrough

Tournament statistics
- Top goal scorer(s): John Hartson; Joey Beauchamp (6 goals)

The 1997–98 Football League Cup (known as the Coca-Cola Cup for sponsorship reasons) was the 38th Football League Cup, a knockout competition for England's top 92 football clubs.

The competition began on 11 August 1997, and ended with the final on 29 March 1998, held at Wembley Stadium. The tournament was won by Chelsea, who beat Middlesbrough 2–0 in the final.

== First round ==
The 70 First, Second and Third Division clubs compete from the First Round. Each section is divided equally into a pot of seeded clubs and a pot of unseeded clubs. Clubs' rankings depend upon their finishing position in the 1996–97 season.

| Tie no | Home team^{1} | (1st Leg) (2nd Leg) Aggregate | Away team |
|---|---|---|---|
| 1 | Blackpool | (1-0) (0-1); 1-1 | Manchester City |
After extra time — Blackpool win 4–2 on penalties
| 2 | Bournemouth | (0-1) (1-1); 1-2 | Torquay United |
| 3 | Brentford | (1-1) (5-3); 6-4 | Shrewsbury Town |
| 4 | Brighton & Hove Albion | (1-1) (1-3); 2-4 | Leyton Orient |
| 5 | Bristol City | (0-0) (2-1); 2-1 | Bristol Rovers |
| 6 | Cambridge United | (1-1) (1-2); 2-3 | West Bromwich Albion |
| 7 | Cardiff City | (1-1) (1-3); 2-4 | Southend United |
| 8 | Charlton Athletic | (0-1) (1-3); 1-4 | Ipswich Town |
| 9 | Chester City | (1-2) (0-3); 1-5 | Carlisle United |
| 10 | Colchester United | (0-1) (1-1); 1-2 | Luton Town |
| 11 | Crewe Alexandra | (2-3) (3-3); 5-6 | Bury |
| 12 | Darlington | (1-1) (1-2); 2-3 | Notts County |
| 13 | Doncaster Rovers | (0-8) (1-2); 1-10 | Nottingham Forest |
| 14 | Gillingham | (0-1) (0-3); 0-4 | Birmingham City |
| 15 | Huddersfield Town | (2-1) (1-1); 3-2 | Bradford City |
| 16 | Lincoln City | (1-1) (1-2); 2-3 | Burnley |
| 17 | Macclesfield Town | (0-0) (1-2); 1-2 | Hull City |
| 18 | Mansfield Town | (4-2) (3-6); 7-8 | Stockport County |
| 19 | Northampton Town | (2-1) (1-2); 3-3 | Millwall |
After extra time — Millwall win 2–0 on penalties
| 20 | Norwich City | (2-1) (1-3); 3-4 | Barnet |
| 21 | Oldham Athletic | (1-0) (0-5); 1-5 | Grimsby Town |
| 22 | Oxford United | (2-0) (5-3); 7-3 | Plymouth Argyle |
| 23 | Peterborough United | (2-2) (2-1); 4-3 | Portsmouth |
| 24 | Port Vale | (1-2) (1-1); 2-3 | York City |
| 25 | QPR | (0-2) (2-1); 2-3 | Wolverhampton Wanderers |
| 26 | Reading | (2-0) (1-1); 3-1 | Swansea City |
| 27 | Rochdale | (1-3) (1-1); 2-4 | Stoke City |
| 28 | Rotherham United | (1-3) (0-2); 1-5 | Preston North End |
| 29 | Scarborough | (0-2) (1-2); 1-4 | Scunthorpe United |
| 30 | Swindon Town | (0-2) (1-1); 1-3 | Watford |
| 31 | Tranmere Rovers | (3-1) (1-2); 4-3 | Hartlepool United |
| 32 | Walsall | (2-0) (1-0); 3-0 | Exeter City |
| 33 | Wigan Athletic | (1-2) (0-1); 1-3 | Chesterfield |
| 34 | Wrexham | (1-1) (1-3); 2-4 | Sheffield United |
| 35 | Wycombe Wanderers | (1-2) (4-4); 5-6 | Fulham |

^{1} Team at home in the 1st leg is denoted as the home team

== Second round ==
The 35 winners from the First Round joined the 13 Premier League clubs not participating in European competition and Middlesbrough and Sunderland who were relegated from the Premier League last season. First leg matches were played on 16 and 17 September, second leg matches were played on 23 and 24 September with one match played on 29 September, seven on 30 September and five on 1 October.

| Tie no | Home team^{1} | (1st Leg) (2nd Leg) Aggregate | Away team |
|---|---|---|---|
| 1 | Birmingham City | (4-1) (1-2); 5-3 | Stockport County |
| 2 | Blackburn Rovers | (6-0) (0-1); 6-1 | Preston North End |
| 3 | Blackpool | (1-0) (1-3); 2-3 | Coventry City |
| 4 | Burnley | (0-4) (0-2); 0-6 | Stoke City |
| 5 | Chesterfield | (1-2) (1-4); 2-6 | Barnsley |
| 6 | Fulham | (0-1) (0-1); 0-2 | Wolverhampton Wanderers |
| 7 | Grimsby Town | (2-0) (2-3); 4-3 | Sheffield Wednesday |
| 8 | Huddersfield Town | (1-0) (0-3); 1-3 | West Ham United |
| 9 | Hull City | (1-0) (1-2); 2-2 | Crystal Palace |
After extra time — Hull City win on away goals
| 10 | Ipswich Town | (1-1) (3-0); 4-1 | Torquay United |
| 11 | Leeds United | (3-1) (1-2); 4-3 | Bristol City |
| 12 | Leyton Orient | (1-3) (4-4); 5-7 | Bolton Wanderers |
| 13 | Luton Town | (1-1) (2-4); 3-5 | West Bromwich Albion |
| 14 | Middlesbrough | (1-0) (2-0); 3-0 | Barnet |
| 15 | Nottingham Forest | (0-1) (2-2); 2-3 | Walsall |
| 16 | Notts County | (0-2) (1-0); 1-2 | Tranmere Rovers |
| 17 | Oxford United | (4-1) (2-1); 6-2 | York City |
| 18 | Reading | (0-0) (2-0); 2-0 | Peterborough United |
| 19 | Scunthorpe United | (0-1) (0-5); 0-6 | Everton |
| 20 | Southampton | (3-1) (2-0); 5-1 | Brentford |
| 21 | Southend United | (0-1) (0-5); 0-6 | Derby County |
| 22 | Sunderland | (2-1) (2-1); 4-2 | Bury |
| 23 | Tottenham Hotspur | (3-2) (2-0); 5-2 | Carlisle United |
| 24 | Watford | (1-1) (0-4); 1-5 | Sheffield United |
| 25 | Wimbledon | (5-1) (4-1); 9-2 | Millwall |

^{1} Team at home in the 1st leg is denoted as the home team

== Third round ==
The 25 winners from the Second Round joined the seven Premiership clubs participating in European competition in Round Three. Matches were played on 14 and 15 October.

| Tie no | Home team | Score | Away team | Date |
|---|---|---|---|---|
| 1 | Arsenal | 4–1 | Birmingham City | 14 October 1997 |
| 2 | Barnsley | 1–2 | Southampton | 14 October 1997 |
| 3 | Bolton Wanderers | 2–0 | Wimbledon | 14 October 1997 |
| 4 | Grimsby Town | 3–1 | Leicester City | 14 October 1997 |
| 5 | Ipswich Town | 2–0 | Manchester United | 14 October 1997 |
| 6 | Oxford United | 1–1 | Tranmere Rovers | 14 October 1997 |
After extra time — Oxford United win 6 – 5 on penalties
| 7 | Reading | 4–2 | Wolverhampton Wanderers | 14 October 1997 |
| 8 | Walsall | 2–1 | Sheffield United | 14 October 1997 |
| 9 | Chelsea | 1–1 | Blackburn Rovers | 15 October 1997 |
After extra time — Chelsea win 4 – 1 on penalties
| 10 | Coventry City | 4–1 | Everton | 15 October 1997 |
| 11 | Middlesbrough | 2–0 | Sunderland | 15 October 1997 |
| 12 | Newcastle United | 2–0 | Hull City | 15 October 1997 |
| 13 | Stoke City | 1–3 | Leeds United | 15 October 1997 |
| 14 | Tottenham Hotspur | 1–2 | Derby County | 15 October 1997 |
| 15 | West Bromwich Albion | 0–2 | Liverpool | 15 October 1997 |
| 16 | West Ham United | 3–0 | Aston Villa | 15 October 1997 |

== Fourth round ==
Matches were played on 18 and 19 November.

1997-11-18
19:45

| Arsenal | 1–0 (a.e.t.) | Coventry City |
|---|---|---|
| Bergkamp 99' |

Highbury, London
Attendance: 30,199
Referee: Gerald Ashby

1997-11-18
19:45

| Derby County | 0–1 | Newcastle United |
|---|---|---|
| | | Tomasson 72' |

Pride Park Stadium, Derby
Attendance: 27,364
Referee: Martin Bodenham

1997-11-18
19:45

| Leeds United | 2–3 | Reading |
|---|---|---|
| Wetherall 16'; Bowyer 54' | | Asaba 9'; Williams 66'; Morley 85' |

Elland Road, Leeds
Attendance: 15,069
Referee: Graham Barber

1997-11-18
19:45

| Liverpool | 3–0 | Grimsby Town |
|---|---|---|
| Owen 28', 45' (pen.), 57' |

Anfield, Liverpool
Attendance: 28,515
Referee: Roy Pearson

1997-11-18
19:45

| Middlesbrough | 2–1 (a.e.t.) | Bolton Wanderers |
|---|---|---|
| Summerbell 39'; Hignett 115' | | Thompson 33' |

Riverside Stadium, Middlesbrough
Attendance: 22,801
Referee: Stephen Lodge

1997-11-18
19:45

| Oxford United | 1–2 (a.e.t.) | Ipswich Town |
|---|---|---|
| Beauchamp 66' | | Dozzell 63'; Mowbray 93' |

Manor Ground, Oxford
Attendance: 5,723
Referee: Scott Mathieson

1997-11-19
19:45

| Chelsea | 2–1 (a.e.t.) | Southampton |
|---|---|---|
| Flo 61'; Morris 118' | | Davies 52' |

Stamford Bridge, London
Attendance: 20,968
Referee: David Elleray

1997-11-19
19:45

| West Ham United | 4–1 | Walsall |
|---|---|---|
| Lampard 15', 73', 74'; Hartson 16' | | Watson 45' |

Boleyn Ground, London
Attendance: 17,463
Referee: David Orr

== Quarter-finals ==
The four matches were played on 6 and 7 January.

1998-01-06
19:45

| Reading | 0 – 1 | Middlesbrough |
|---|---|---|
| | | Hignett 89' |

Elm Park, Reading
Attendance: 13,072
Referee: George Cain

1998-01-06
19:45

| West Ham United | 1 – 2 | Arsenal |
|---|---|---|
| Abou 75' | | Wright 25'; Overmars 52' |

Boleyn Ground, London
Attendance: 24,770
Referee: Graham Barber

1998-01-07
19:45

| Ipswich Town | 2 – 2 (a.e.t.) 1 – 4p | Chelsea |
|---|---|---|
| Taricco 45'; Mathie 62' | | Flo 32'; Le Saux 45' |

Portman Road, Ipswich
Attendance: 22,088
Referee: Paul Durkin

1998-01-07
19:45

| Newcastle United | 0 – 2 (a.e.t.) | Liverpool |
|---|---|---|
| | | Owen 95'; Fowler 103' |

St James' Park, Newcastle
Attendance: 33,207
Referee: Dermot Gallagher

== Semi-finals ==
The semi-final draw was made in January 1998 after the conclusion of the quarter finals. Unlike the other rounds, the semi-final ties were played over two legs, with each team playing one leg at home. The first leg matches were played on 27 and 28 January 1998, the second leg matches were played on 18 February 1998. Arsenal's hopes of a unique domestic treble were ended by London rivals Chelsea, while Liverpool suffered a surprise exit at the hands of Middlesbrough.

=== First leg ===
1998-01-27
19:45

| Liverpool | 2 – 1 | Middlesbrough |
|---|---|---|
| Redknapp 31'; Fowler 82' | | Merson 29' |

Anfield, Liverpool
Attendance: 33,438
Referee: Gary Willard

1998-01-28
19:45

| Arsenal | 2 – 1 | Chelsea |
|---|---|---|
| Overmars 23'; Hughes 47' | | Hughes 68' |

Highbury, London
Attendance: 38,114
Referee: Martin Bodenham

=== Second leg ===
1998-02-18
19:45

| Middlesbrough | 2 – 0 | Liverpool |
|---|---|---|
| Merson 2' (pen.); Branca 4' |

Riverside Stadium, Middlesbrough
Attendance: 29,828
Referee: Paul Durkin

Middlesbrough win 3-2 on aggregate

1998-02-18
19:45

| Chelsea | 3 – 1 | Arsenal |
|---|---|---|
| Hughes 10'; Di Matteo 51'; Petrescu 53' | | Bergkamp 82' (pen.) |

Stamford Bridge, London
Attendance: 34,330
Referee: Graham Poll

Chelsea win 4-3 on aggregate

== Final ==
The 1998 Coca-Cola Cup Final was played on 29 March 1998 and was contested between Chelsea and Middlesbrough at Wembley Stadium. Chelsea won the final 2–0 in extra time thanks to goals from Frank Sinclair and Roberto Di Matteo.

29 March 1998
15:00

| Chelsea | 2–0 (a.e.t.) | Middlesbrough |
|---|---|---|
| Sinclair 95'; Di Matteo 107' |

Wembley Stadium, London
Attendance: 77,698
Referee: Peter Jones
