= Terry Byrne =

English businessman (b.1966)

- Born: 4 June 1966 (age 60); London, England
- Occupation: Football manager
- Known for: David Beckham's personal manager 2003–2008

Terry Byrne (born 4 June 1966) is an English businessman and a director of various companies connected to football that are active in the United Kingdom and the United States. He is best known for his business relationship and close friendship with the footballer David Beckham, spending years as his personal manager and business adviser.

== Early life ==
Born in London to a father who ran a pub and a mother who worked as a hairdresser and did aromatherapy, Byrne was a dedicated Chelsea F.C. fan growing up, with dreams of becoming a professional footballer. However, he only played as far as youth football at the lower-league clubs Leyton Orient F.C. and Cambridge United F.C.

Following a period working as a cab driver in London, Byrne decided to try sports massage after seeing a 'help wanted' advertisement placed by Chelsea's team physiotherapist at one of the matches. Byrne was not hired, but went on to complete a one-year course at the London School of Sports Massage.

== Career in and around football ==
=== Chelsea FC backroom medical staff ===
In summer 1992, Byrne was hired as part-time sports masseur with Chelsea's backroom medical staff, helping out the team physiotherapist on match days. Ian Porterfield was the club's manager at the time. In February 1993, roughly six months into Byrne's time with the club, Porterfield was replaced by David Webb who was in turn dismissed in summer 1993 to make way for Glenn Hoddle.

Having previously played for AS Monaco where the practice of having several full-time masseurs was common, Hoddle wanted to implement the same at Chelsea. Byrne seemed the obvious choice for the role. However, wanting to cut costs, the club chairman Ken Bates would not pay two separate salaries for a kit manager and a sports masseur, so Byrne became both for a single annual salary of £12,000. Byrne thus became the first full-time masseur in English football. He held the two roles simultaneously under Hoddle for two years, before deciding to devote himself to physiotherapy by enrolling in the Football Association sponsored two-year course for sports injuries, while still working as a masseur at Chelsea where he eventually became the team's assistant physiotherapist.

In summer 1996, Hoddle was made the England national football team manager and left Chelsea. He took Byrne with him, giving him a position on England's medical staff, although Byrne also continued at Chelsea as the team's assistant physiotherapist in the 1996–97 Chelsea F.C. season under the new manager, Ruud Gullit. Byrne simultaneously performed both jobs over the next three years. He worked for England as one of the team masseurs, rejuvenating tired and injured players between matches. This is where his close friendship with the rising young star David Beckham began to develop.

Back at Chelsea, Gullit was sacked in February 1998, but Byrne continued under the next manager, Gianluca Vialli.

Byrne's relationship with Beckham intensified during the 1998 FIFA World Cup in France where the masseur became a close confidant to the twenty-three-year-old, helping him cope with the pressures of his first major international tournament. Byrne became the listening post through the player's World Cup ups and downs, such as not playing in the opening group match against Tunisia or his free-kick goal against Colombia. After Beckham was sent off in the second round against Argentina, Byrne alone accompanied Beckham back to the changing room, offering a shoulder to cry on as well as providing continuing support while the English public and the media criticised the player.

In 1999, Byrne's attempt to put the ball back into play during a Chelsea match against Coventry City led to a brawl with the Coventry manager, Gordon Strachan, and along with others he was later fined for misconduct.

In September 2000, early in the 2000–01 Premier League season, Vialli was sacked by Chelsea. Byrne continued the 2000–01 Chelsea season under the new manager, Claudio Ranieri. At the end of the season, Byrne left Chelsea after nine years with the club, following an offer from Vialli to be a part of his extensive management team at Watford.

=== Watford FC general manager and director of football ===
Byrne joined Watford F.C. in 2001, brought in by Vialli on a three-year contract. The club drew up an ambitious three-year plan of gaining promotion from the second-tier First Division and returning to the Premiership where it had played during the 1999–00 season. Several high-profile signings, such as 30-year-old Ramon Vega and 24-year-old Stephen Hughes, joined in summer 2001 as the wage bills soared, with even Vialli paid close to £1 million a year. Byrne's exact duties as general manager in Vialli's management team were very loosely defined as he became involved in various aspects of the club's backroom business.

By Christmas, it was obvious that Watford had no hope of promotion and, coupled with the spring 2002 collapse of ITV Digital, the DTT broadcaster that held The Football League's television rights, the entire Watford project turned into financial ruin overnight. After finishing the 2001–02 First Division season in 14th place, the club ended Vialli's contract two years early and made attempts to avoid administration.

Following Vialli's dismissal, the club's recently appointed chairman, Graham Simpson, promoted Byrne to the post of director of football – a newly created role responsible for player contracts, scouting and the academy. One of Byrne's first tasks was hiring the next club manager, a job that went to Vialli's assistant Ray Lewington. Watford spent most of the 2002–03 First Division season trying to come up with an acceptable financial model that would allow the club to survive now that TV money was no longer there as a revenue source. The cash-strapped club narrowly avoided administration in the 2002–03 season by instituting cost-cutting measures such as forcing players and staff to accept a 12% wage deferral and raising funds via a share issue.

On 31 October 2003, it was announced that Byrne had been appointed as Beckham's personal manager from December 2003.

=== Beckham's personal manager ===
Byrne stayed with Watford for two and a half years before becoming Beckham's personal manager and an executive of Beckham's company, Footwork Productions Limited. In actuality, Byrne had been involved with certain aspects of Beckham's business dealings long before he formally became the player's personal manager. For example, in 2002, on Beckham's behalf, Byrne met with Tim Leiweke, the chief executive of Anschutz Entertainment Group (AEG, the company that owns the Los Angeles Galaxy and at the time also owned four other MLS franchises) in London to discuss Beckham's interest in starting a soccer academy for boys and girls with branches in London and Los Angeles.

When Byrne formally came on board, Beckham was with Real Madrid, which meant the manager had to move to Spain. Only months earlier, Beckham had left his long-time representative agency SFX to join Simon Fuller's 19 Entertainment that already managed the career of his pop-star wife Victoria. For Byrne, this meant working closely with Fuller in many aspects of his new job.

In 2006, Byrne launched 1966 Entertainment Limited, a joint venture with Fuller, and in 2009 Byrne acquired 100% of the company. 1966 Entertainment represents the England football team players' interests in their commercial partnership with the Football Association.

Byrne negotiated Beckham's contract with the Los Angeles Galaxy and remains a close friend.

In July 2007, Beckham made the long-anticipated mid-season switch to Los Angeles with Byrne having played a key role in arranging the transfer six months earlier. Some aspects of Byrne's subsequent involvement with the LA Galaxy have been controversial. Through his long-standing relationship with AEG's Tim Leiweke, Byrne became a consultant on the club payroll, which created an obvious conflict of interest, with a player's personal manager also paid for consulting services to that player's club management. Additionally, Byrne's appointment was not revealed to the public or to the club's players. All of this allowed Beckham, Byrne and 19 Entertainment to run the club from behind the scenes. Byrne carried out moves such as requesting the captain's armband to be given to Beckham immediately on joining the team, which eventually created tension with the club's then captain, Landon Donovan. Byrne hired club personnel, ignoring Galaxy's general manager Alexei Lalas, such as bringing Ruud Gullit as head coach in November 2007.

In 2008, 1966 Entertainment launched the Team England footballers' charity which donates players' match fees to their charity partners. The idea arose from Byrne's discussions with the players' committee.

=== Co-founding Aura Entertainment ===
After ending his role as Beckham's personal manager, Byrne confirmed in January 2009 that he was in talks with the Leyton Orient chairman Barry Hearn regarding a possible takeover by the Byrne-headed consortium. However, this did not materialise.

In 2009, Byrne became a founding partner of Aura Entertainment along with Steve Clarke, David Piper and James Oxley. Aura Entertainment, along with David Gardiner and SEQ, created Arena 3000 (later renamed A:3K), of which Byrne is also a director.

A:3K's main activity is sports entertainment. Specifically, the company puts on entertainment events in indoor arenas during the summer off-season featuring well-known footballers. The shows combine elements of football with performing arts and technology. Byrne put together A:3K Football, a skills challenge event with a futuristic gladiator setting at The O2 arena in London on 17 July 2010 with David Villa, Cesc Fabregas, Cristiano Ronaldo, Didier Drogba, Steven Gerrard and Wayne Rooney. However, the event was postponed after Rooney and Gerrard, two of the most interesting names for the English crowd, withdrew, fearing a backlash for appearing at a highly paid event so soon after England's poor showing in the 2010 World Cup.

=== Reviving the New York Cosmos ===
In 2010, Byrne helped to revive the New York Cosmos, working with former Tottenham Hotspur vice-chairman Paul Kemsley. He and Kemsley sold their stake in the team the following year.

=== Pelé and Sport 10 ===
After the revived Cosmos hired former global superstar Pelé as brand ambassador, Byrna and Kemsley formed a management agency named Sport 10 to handle the former superstar's merchandising and promotional deals. Byrne kept his position at the agency after leaving the Cosmos.
