= 1994–95 Chelsea F.C. season =

English football club season

Chelsea F.C.
1994–95 season
- Chairman: Ken Bates
- Manager: Glenn Hoddle
- Stadium: Stamford Bridge
- FA Premier League: 11th
- FA Cup: Fourth round
- League Cup: Third round
- UEFA Cup Winners' Cup: Semi-finals
- Top goalscorer: League: John Spencer (11); All: John Spencer/Paul Furlong (13)
- Highest home attendance: 31,161 vs Manchester United (26 Dec 1994, Premier League)
- Lowest home attendance: 8,974 vs Bournemouth (21 Sep 1994, League Cup)
- Average home league attendance: 21,057
Home colours	Away colours

During the 1994–95 English football season, Chelsea competed in the Premier League.

== Season summary ==
It was another unsatisfying season for Chelsea, who failed to make much of an impact in the league but once again enjoyed a memorable cup run. They entered the Cup Winners' Cup after a 23-year exile from European competitions, and reached the semi-finals where they went out to a single Real Zaragoza goal, ending their hopes of an all-English final with Arsenal.

The summer of 1995 saw manager Glenn Hoddle bring in two of the most famous names in world football, Ruud Gullit and Mark Hughes. He also terminated the contract of misfit striker Robert Fleck as well as deciding to end his own playing career. The only other significant change to the squad was the sale of out-of-favour midfielder David Hopkin to Crystal Palace.

== Final league table ==
Pos	Team	Pld	W	D	L	GF	GA	GD	Pts	Qualification or relegation
9	Wimbledon	42	15	11	16	48	65	−17	56	Qualification for the Intertoto Cup group stage
10	Southampton	42	12	18	12	61	63	−2	54	
11	Chelsea	42	13	15	14	50	55	−5	54	
12	Arsenal	42	13	12	17	52	49	+3	51	
13	Sheffield Wednesday	42	13	12	17	49	57	−8	51	Qualification for the Intertoto Cup group stage

Source: Premier League
Rules for classification: 1) points; 2) goal difference; 3) number of goals scored.

Results summary

Overall								Home						Away					
Pld	W	D	L	GF	GA	GD	Pts	W	D	L	GF	GA	GD	W	D	L	GF	GA	GD
42	13	15	14	50	55	−5	54	7	7	7	25	22	+3	6	8	7	25	33	−8

Source: Statto

Results by round

Round	1	2	3	4	5	6	7	8	9	10	11	12	13	14	15	16	17	18	19	20	21	22	23	24	25	26	27	28	29	30	31	32	33	34	35	36	37	38	39	40	41	42
Ground	H	A	H	A	H	A	H	H	A	H	A	H	A	A	A	H	A	A	H	H	A	H	H	A	H	A	H	A	H	A	H	A	A	H	A	H	H	A	H	A	A	H
Result	W	W	W	L	L	W	L	W	L	W	D	D	L	W	D	L	W	L	D	L	L	D	D	D	L	D	D	W	D	W	L	L	L	D	D	L	W	D	W	D	D	W
Position	3	6	5	6	7	5	7	6	7	7	7	8	8	7	6	8	7	8	8	9	10	10	12	12	12	12	13	13	13	10	11	14	15	15	14	15	14	14	12	12	12	11

Source: Statto.com
A = Away; H = Home; W = Win; D = Draw; L = Loss

== Results ==
Chelsea's score comes first

=== Legend ===
Win	Draw	Loss

=== FA Premier League ===
Date	Opponent	Venue	Result	Attendance	Scorers
20 August 1994	Norwich City	H	2–0	23,098	Sinclair, Furlong
27 August 1994	Leeds United	A	3–2	32,212	Wise (pen), Spencer (2)
31 August 1994	Manchester City	H	3–0	21,740	Peacock, Wise, Vonk (own goal)
10 September 1994	Newcastle United	A	2–4	34,435	Peacock, Furlong
18 September 1994	Blackburn Rovers	H	1–2	17,513	Spencer
24 September 1994	Crystal Palace	A	1–0	16,030	Furlong
2 October 1994	West Ham United	H	1–2	18,696	Furlong
8 October 1994	Leicester City	H	4–0	18,397	Spencer (2), Peacock, Shipperley
15 October 1994	Arsenal	A	1–3	38,234	Wise
23 October 1994	Ipswich Town	H	2–0	15,068	Wise, Shipperley
29 October 1994	Sheffield Wednesday	A	1–1	25,450	Wise
6 November 1994	Coventry City	H	2–2	17,090	Spencer, Kjeldbjerg
9 November 1994	Liverpool	A	1–3	32,855	Spencer
19 November 1994	Nottingham Forest	A	1–0	22,092	Spencer
23 November 1994	Tottenham Hotspur	A	0–0	27,037	
26 November 1994	Everton	H	0–1	28,115	
3 December 1994	Southampton	A	1–0	14,404	Furlong
10 December 1994	Norwich City	A	0–3	18,246	
18 December 1994	Liverpool	H	0–0	27,050	
26 December 1994	Manchester United	H	2–3	31,161	Spencer (pen), Newton
28 December 1994	Aston Villa	A	0–3	32,901	
31 December 1994	Wimbledon	H	1–1	16,105	Furlong
14 January 1995	Sheffield Wednesday	H	1–1	17,285	Spencer
21 January 1995	Ipswich Town	A	2–2	17,296	Stein, Burley
25 January 1995	Nottingham Forest	H	0–2	17,890	
4 February 1995	Coventry City	A	2–2	13,429	Stein, Spencer (pen)
11 February 1995	Tottenham Hotspur	H	1–1	30,812	Wise
25 February 1995	West Ham United	A	2–1	21,500	Burley, Stein
5 March 1995	Crystal Palace	H	0–0	14,130	
8 March 1995	Manchester City	A	2–1	21,880	Stein (2)
11 March 1995	Leeds United	H	0–3	20,174	
18 March 1995	Blackburn Rovers	A	1–2	25,490	Stein
22 March 1995	Queens Park Rangers	A	0–1	15,103	
1 April 1995	Newcastle United	H	1–1	22,987	Peacock
10 April 1995	Wimbledon	A	1–1	7,022	Sinclair
12 April 1995	Southampton	H	0–2	16,738	
15 April 1995	Aston Villa	H	1–0	17,015	Stein
17 April 1995	Manchester United	A	0–0	43,728	
29 April 1995	Queens Park Rangers	H	1–0	21,704	Sinclair
3 May 1995	Everton	A	3–3	33,180	Furlong (2), Hopkin
6 May 1995	Leicester City	A	1–1	18,140	Furlong
14 May 1995	Arsenal	H	2–1	29,542	Furlong, Stein

=== FA Cup ===
==== Third round ====
7 January 1995	Chelsea	3–0	Charlton Athletic	Stamford Bridge, London
	Peacock 9'; Sinclair 41'; Spencer 89'			Attendance: 24,485; Referee: Terry Holbrook

==== Fourth round ====
28 January 1995	Millwall	0–0	Chelsea	The Den, London
				Attendance: 18,573; Referee: Roger Dilkes

8 February 1995	Chelsea	1–1 (a.e.t.) (4–5 p)	Millwall	Stamford Bridge, London
	Stein 71'		Savage 79'	Attendance: 25,515; Referee: Martin Bodenham
	Penalties
	Stein (penalty scored); Wise (penalty scored); Burley (penalty scored); Lee (penalty scored); Spencer (penalty missed)		(penalty scored) Savage; (penalty scored) van Blerk; (penalty scored) Stevens; (penalty scored) Roberts; (penalty scored) Rae

=== League Cup ===
==== Second round ====
21 September 1994	Chelsea	1–0	Bournemouth	Stamford Bridge, London
	Rocastle 26'			Attendance: 8,974; Referee: Paul Vanes

4 October 1994	Bournemouth	0–1	Chelsea	Dean Court, Dorset
			Peacock 63'	Attendance: 9,784; Referee: Paul Durkin

==== Third round ====
26 October 1994	West Ham United	1–0	Chelsea	Boleyn Ground, London
	Hutchison 2'			Attendance: 18,815; Referee: Keith Cooper

=== Cup Winners' Cup ===
==== First round ====
15 September 1994	Chelsea (England)	4–2	(Czech Republic) Viktoria Žižkov	Stamford Bridge, London
17:00	Furlong 3'; Sinclair 5'; Rocastle 54'; Wise 69'	Report	Majoroš 36', 42'	Attendance: 22,036; Referee: Christer Fällström (Sweden)

29 September 1994	Viktoria Žižkov (Czech Republic)	0–0	(England) Chelsea	[Jablonec]
15:00		Report		Attendance: 5,176; Referee: Gianni Beschin (Italy)

==== Second round ====
20 October 1994	Chelsea (England)	0–0	Austria Wien	Stamford Bridge, London
20:00		Report		Attendance: 22,560; Referee: Atanas Uzunov (Bulgaria)

3 November 1994	Austria Wien	1–1	(England) Chelsea	Ernst-Happel-Stadion, Vienna
19:35	Narbekovas 74'	Report	Spencer 41'	Attendance: 18,000; Referee: Frans van den Wijngaert (Belgium)

==== Quarter-finals ====
28 February 1995	Club Brugge (Belgium)	1–0	(England) Chelsea	Jan Breydel Stadium, Bruges
20:30	Verheyen 82'	Report		Attendance: 16,145; Referee: Serge Muhmenthaler (Switzerland)

16 March 1995	Chelsea (England)	2–0	(Belgium) Club Brugge	Stamford Bridge, London
20:05	Stein 16'; Furlong 37'	Report		Attendance: 28,661; Referee: Pierluigi Pairetto (Italy)

==== Semi-finals ====
6 April 1995	Real Zaragoza (Spain)	3–0	(England) Chelsea	La Romareda, Zaragoza
21:15	Pardeza 8'; Esnáider 26', 57'	Report		Attendance: 37,000; Referee: Leif Sundell (Sweden)

20 April 1995	Chelsea (England)	3–1	(Spain) Real Zaragoza	Stamford Bridge, London
20:00	Furlong 31'; Sinclair 62'; Stein 86'	Report	Aragón 55'	Attendance: 26,500; Referee: Jorge Monteiro Coroado (Portugal)

== Squad ==
Note: Flags indicate national team as defined under FIFA eligibility rules; some limited exceptions apply. Players may hold more than one non-FIFA nationality.

No.	Pos.	Nation	Player
1	GK	RUS	Dmitri Kharine
2	DF	SCO	Steve Clarke
3	DF	ENG	Scott Minto
4	DF	DEN	Jakob Kjeldbjerg
5	DF	NOR	Erland Johnsen
6	DF	ENG	Frank Sinclair
7	FW	SCO	John Spencer
8	FW	ENG	Paul Furlong
9	FW	RSA	Mark Stein
10	MF	ENG	Gavin Peacock
11	MF	ENG	Dennis Wise (captain)
12	MF	SCO	Craig Burley
13	GK	ENG	Kevin Hitchcock
14	DF	WAL	Darren Barnard
15	DF	ENG	Andy Myers

No.	Pos.	Nation	Player
16	MF	SCO	David Hopkin
17	MF	ENG	Nigel Spackman
18	MF	ENG	Eddie Newton
20	MF	ENG	Glenn Hoddle (player–manager)
21	MF	ENG	David Rocastle
22	DF	ENG	Anthony Barness
23	GK	IRL	Nick Colgan
24	FW	SCO	Robert Fleck
25	DF	ENG	David Lee
26	DF	SCO	Andy Dow
27	DF	WAL	Gareth Hall
28	DF	ENG	Michael Duberry
29	GK	ENG	Alan Judge
31	MF	ENG	Graham Rix

=== Left club during season ===
Note: Flags indicate national team as defined under FIFA eligibility rules; some limited exceptions apply. Players may hold more than one non-FIFA nationality.

No.	Pos.	Nation	Player
19	FW	ENG	Neil Shipperley (to Southampton)

=== Reserve squad ===
Note: Flags indicate national team as defined under FIFA eligibility rules; some limited exceptions apply. Players may hold more than one non-FIFA nationality.

No.	Pos.	Nation	Player
—	MF	ENG	Paul Hughes
—	MF	GEO	Thiago Naladze

No.	Pos.	Nation	Player
—	MF	TUR	Muzzy Izzet
—	FW	MSR	Junior Mendes

== Transfers ==
=== In ===
Date	Pos	Name	From	Fee
26 May 1994	FW	Paul Furlong	Watford	£2,300,000
28 May 1994	DF	Scott Minto	Charlton Athletic	£775,000
12 August 1994	MF	David Rocastle	Manchester City	£1,250,000

=== Out ===
Date	Pos	Name	To	Fee
6 January 1995	FW	Neil Shipperley	Southampton	£1,250,000

Transfers in: ▼£4,325,000
Transfers out: ▲£1,250,000
Total spending: ▼£3,075,000
