= Dennis Wise =

English football player and manager (born 1966)

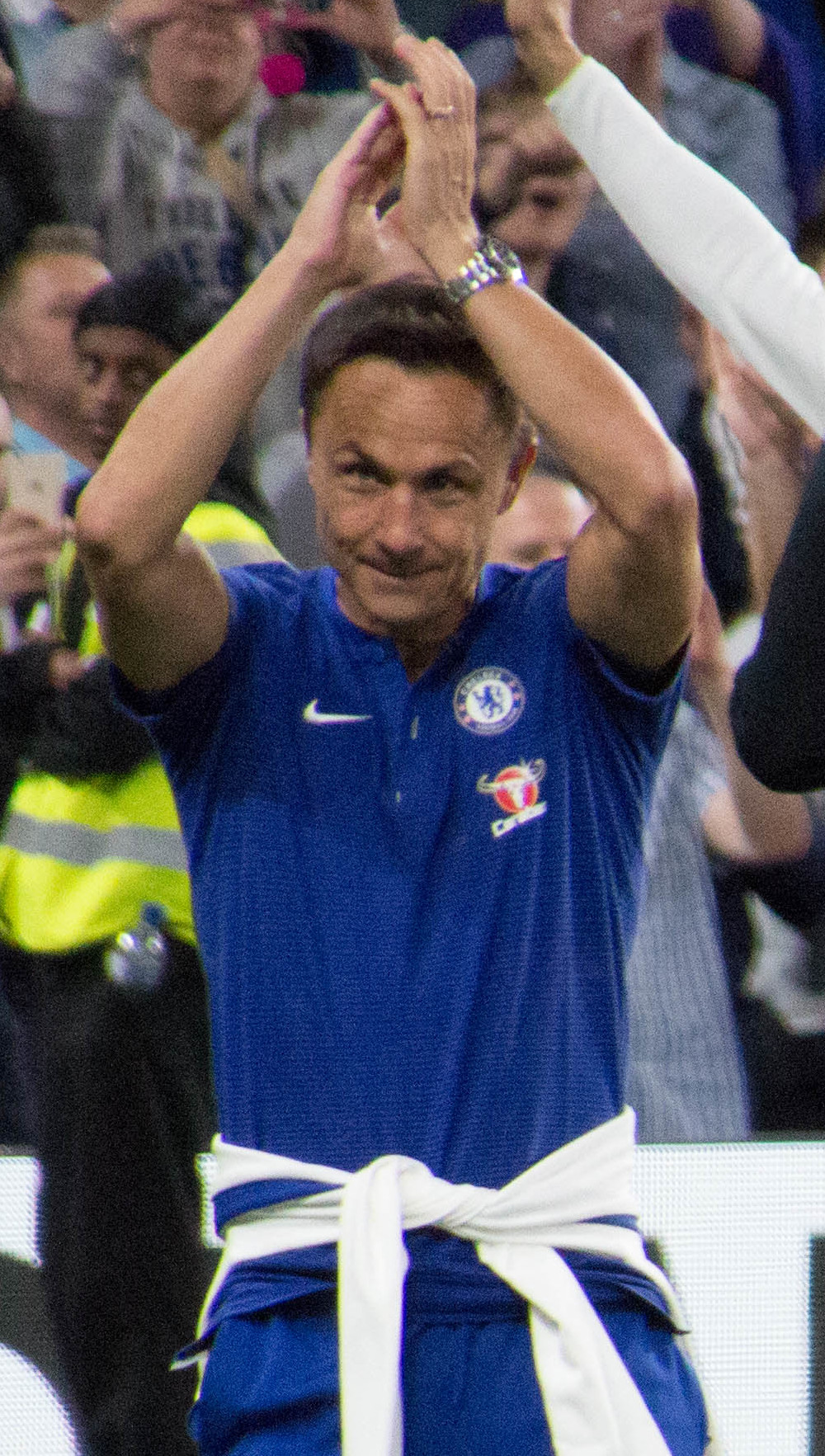
- Wise in 2018

Personal information
- Full name: Dennis Frank Wise
- Date of birth: 16 December 1966 (age 59)
- Place of birth: Kensington, England
- Height: 5 ft 6 in (1.68 m)
- Position: Midfielder

Youth career
- 1983–1985: Southampton

Senior career*
Years	Team	Apps	(Gls)
1985–1990	Wimbledon	135	(27)
1985	→ Grebbestads IF (loan)	10	(5)
1990–2001	Chelsea	332	(53)
2001–2002	Leicester City	17	(1)
2002–2005	Millwall	85	(7)
2005–2006	Southampton	11	(1)
2006	Coventry City	13	(6)
2006	Swindon Town	0	(0)
Total		593	(95)

International career
1988	England U21	1	(0)
1989–1990	England B	3	(1)
1991–2000	England	21	(1)

Managerial career
- 2003–2005: Millwall
- 2005: Southampton (caretaker)
- 2006: Swindon Town
- 2006–2008: Leeds United
- * Club domestic league appearances and goals

Dennis Frank Wise (born 16 December 1966) is an English former professional football player and manager who played as a central midfielder. He spent the majority of his career at Chelsea, from 1990 to 2001.

Beginning his career at Wimbledon, Wise came to prominence as a member of the "Crazy Gang", and in 1988, was part of the team that won the FA Cup in an upset victory over Liverpool. In 1990, he joined Chelsea, becoming captain three years later under the stewardship of Glenn Hoddle. During his time at Stamford Bridge, Wise won two FA Cups, a League Cup and a UEFA Cup Winners' Cup, and is the club's second most successful captain, behind John Terry. Wise was a popular figure amongst the Chelsea support, and was named the club's Player of the Year on two occasions. In June 2001, he was sold to Leicester City.

Internationally, Wise was in and out of the squad for the England national football team, with the majority of his appearances coming in 2000, when Kevin Keegan was manager. He was named in the UEFA Euro 2000 squad, playing in all three of England's group games. His only goal for the national side was on his debut on 1 May 1991, against Turkey.

Wise was player-manager of Millwall, taking them to the 2004 FA Cup Final and European football for the first time. He was briefly caretaker manager at Southampton in 2005. After two months in charge of Swindon Town, he was appointed at Championship side Leeds United in October 2006. After relegation to League One, he made a good start to the season before a surprise move in January 2008 to Newcastle United in an executive role for the academy, until April 2009. From 2021 to 2024, he was the sole administrator of Italian club Como 1907. He has also worked as a pundit for Sky Sports, and in 2017 he appeared on the seventeenth series of I'm a Celebrity...Get Me Out of Here!.

== Playing career ==
=== Wimbledon ===
Wise started his career as an apprentice with Southampton, but was left without a club after he fell out with manager Lawrie McMenemy. He moved to Wimbledon on 28 March 1985 at the age of 18 on a free transfer and made his debut under manager Dave Bassett. During the autumn of 1985, Wise was loaned to Swedish non-league club Grebbestads IF. He returned to Plough Lane following his loan spell and helped the club gain promotion to the Football League First Division in 1986. In his first season in the First Division, Wise scored four goals in 27 starts as the club defied the critics and finished the season in sixth place.

He was a member of the infamous Wimbledon "Crazy Gang" that reached the 1988 FA Cup Final. On 12 March 1988, he provided the free-kick from which Brian Gayle headed in the clinching goal against Watford to secure passage to the semi-finals of the FA Cup. In Wimbledon's semi-final match against Luton Town on 9 April, he scored the winner as they reached the final with a 2–1 victory. In the final on 14 May, he played an influential role in defeating heavy favourites Liverpool at Wembley, containing winger John Barnes and supplying the cross from a free kick from which Lawrie Sanchez headed home the winning goal. Wimbledon were unable to compete in the 1988–89 European Cup Winners' Cup, due to the ongoing ban on English teams from European competitions, following the actions of a group of Liverpool supporters in the 1985 European Cup Final Heysel disaster.

=== Chelsea ===
Wise signed for Chelsea on 3 July 1990 for a then-club record fee of £1.6 million. In his first season with the club, he scored 13 goals in 44 matches as Chelsea finished in 11th place. Wise's former Wimbledon teammate Vinnie Jones joined Chelsea prior to the 1991–92 season, and the intimidating presence of his fellow Londoner in the middle of the park seemed to help him rediscover his best form. Wise was Chelsea's top scorer for the season with 14 goals from midfield, with perhaps his best performance coming in a 2–1 victory away to Liverpool on 1 February 1992; Chelsea's first league win at Anfield since 1935.

Following the departure of captain Andy Townsend in 1993, and the arrival of Glenn Hoddle as manager, Wise's growing stature within the side was recognised, with Hoddle installing him as captain. Though league form was disappointing throughout the 1993–94 season, with the Blues finishing 14th, Wise led Chelsea to their first FA Cup Final in 24 years, though he couldn't prevent the Blues crashing to a 4–0 defeat to Manchester United.

In the second league match of the 1994–95 season, Wise scored his first goal, netting a penalty as the Blues came from 0–2 down to defeat Leeds United 3–2 on 27 August 1994. Wise's ill-discipline began to show at the beginning of the 1994–95 season, picking up a red card for swearing in a 2–4 loss to Newcastle United on 10 September. He scored his first goal in Europe five days later, capping off an impressive Chelsea performance as the Blues defeated Viktoria Žižkov 4–2 in the first round of the Cup Winners' Cup. Worse was to follow off the pitch as Wise was sentenced to a three-month prison term in March 1995 for assaulting a London taxi-driver and was ordered to pay £965 compensation to him for damage to the cab, £169 for damage to his spectacles and £100 for the shock and distress. The prison sentence was later overturned on appeal. Nonetheless he was briefly stripped of the Chelsea captaincy by Hoddle over the affair, and a long term thigh injury capped a miserable season for the midfielder.

Wise captained the Chelsea team that defeated Middlesbrough 2–0 in the 1997 FA Cup Final, only the club's second FA Cup triumph and Wise's first trophy as Chelsea captain. Chelsea's success would continue in the 1997–98 season as Wise first led Chelsea to victory in the League Cup, another 2–0 win against Middlesbrough, the midfielder's cross for Frank Sinclair's opener capping a superb display. Wise also made a decisive contribution in the Cup Winners' Cup final, a dinked pass over the Stuttgart defence setting up Gianfranco Zola to score the winner, moments after coming on as a substitute.

Wise then captained Chelsea to victory over Real Madrid in the 1998 UEFA Super Cup, a late Gus Poyet strike securing a 1–0 victory in Monaco. His disciplinary issues were so severe during the 1998–99 season, that Wise missed no fewer than 15 matches in all competitions. He received three red cards in addition to being charged with biting the arm of Real Mallorca defender Elena Marcelino in the second half of their Cup Winners' Cup semi-final first-leg 1–1 draw at Stamford Bridge, though he was later cleared by UEFA. In the Premier League, he led Chelsea to their highest ever final position at the time, third, thereby securing a place in the Champions League for the first time in the club's history, losing only three leagues games along the way, a feat bettered by only three English champions in the 20th century.

In Chelsea's first ever Champions League match, a third-qualifying round match against Latvian side Skonto FC, Wise captained the side to a 3–0 victory, and 0–0 draw in the second leg meant that Chelsea had qualified for the group stage of the Champions League at the first time of asking. On 20 October 1999, he came on as a second-half substitute and scored Chelsea's fourth goal as they defeated Galatasaray 5–0 in Istanbul in their fourth Champions League group match. He scored a memorable Champions League equaliser in the San Siro against A.C. Milan a week later to secure top spot in the group. In February 2000 his disciplinary problems resurfaced as he was charged with misconduct by the FA following an alleged confrontation with Kenny Cunningham in the tunnel after the 3–1 victory over former club Wimbledon at Stamford Bridge, and was later fined £7,500. Wise captained Chelsea to their second FA Cup win in three years, being awarded the Man of the Match honour as the Blues defeated Aston Villa 1–0 courtesy of a Roberto Di Matteo goal on 20 May 2000. Wise's last major trophy as captain of Chelsea would come in the 2000 FA Charity Shield on 13 August, as goals from Jimmy Floyd Hasselbaink and Mario Melchiot secured a 2–0 win over reigning league champions Manchester United.

With new manager Claudio Ranieri seeking to lower the average age of the Chelsea squad, he was sold to Leicester City on 25 June 2001 for £1.6 million. His time at Stamford Bridge would span 11 years, from 1990 to 2001 and when he finally left Chelsea, the combative midfielder finished with the fourth most appearances in the club's history, featuring 445 times and scoring 76 goals.

=== Leicester City ===
Wise's time at Leicester was less successful and marred by controversy. He made just 17 league appearances, scoring once against Liverpool, and was sent home from a pre-season tour of Finland and suspended by the club on 20 July 2002 after breaking the nose and jaw of teammate Callum Davidson in an argument.

Wise was sacked by the club for serious misconduct on 2 August, after which Leicester went into administration. Surprised by the dismissal, he contacted the Professional Footballers' Association and appealed against the decision. The Football League Disciplinary Commission later ruled that Wise had been harshly treated by Leicester and ordered that he be reinstated and given the maximum punishment of two weeks' wages (about £70,000). The tribunal's order led the club to launch an appeal against the decision, which they won on 18 September.

=== Millwall ===
Six days after his dismissal from Leicester, Wise signed for First Division club Millwall on 24 September 2002. Manager Mark McGhee said "He'll intimidate the opposition but, because of his reputation, it's got be controlled. I don't want him to miss half his games". He made his debut four days later in a 3–2 win at Coventry City, and was booked within two minutes for a foul on their player-manager Gary McAllister. On 26 October, he scored his first goal for the club, opening a 3–0 win over Derby County at The Den.

McGhee left in October 2003, and Wise succeeded him as player-manager for what was initially a four-game stint. On his debut in a 2–0 home win over Sheffield United on 18 October, David Livermore was sent off, so Wise brought himself on as a substitute. Within four minutes of coming on, he too was sent off for a foul on Chris Armstrong. Wise ruled out becoming the manager permanently, as he said he wanted to obtain his UEFA B coaching licence. However, having won two and drawn one of his four fixtures, he and experienced assistant Ray Wilkins were given contracts until June 2005. Millwall lost to Reading in their next game, and Wilkins said that Wise would need time to grow into the role, like Gianluca Vialli had done at Chelsea.

Millwall were the first team from outside the top flight to reach the FA Cup final since Sunderland in 1992 when Wise led them to their first ever FA Cup Final in 2004. They lost 3–0 to Manchester United. Despite losing, Millwall qualified for a place in the UEFA Cup for the first time in their history, as United had already qualified for the Champions League. They were knocked out in the first round by Hungarian champions Ferencváros. Despite having added a year to his contract in December 2004, he resigned at the end of the 2004–05 season, as new ownership entered the club.

=== Southampton ===
Wise returned to Southampton on a free transfer on 27 June 2005 and made 12 appearances for the club. With the resignation of Harry Redknapp, he was briefly joint-caretaker manager of the club with Dave Bassett, but left St Mary's on 26 December, when George Burley was appointed as the new manager. He scored once in the league for Southampton, in a 2–2 draw with Ipswich Town.

=== Coventry City ===
It was not long before Wise was playing again, as he signed a six-month deal with Coventry City on 19 January 2006. He joined up once again with Micky Adams, who had been his manager whilst he was at Leicester. He scored a goal in each of his first three games with the club, including an overhead kick from the edge of the penalty area against Hull City. On 9 May, out-of-contract Wise was offered a new one-year contract at the Ricoh Arena but decided it was time to retire from playing and go back into management. He finished his Coventry career having scored six goals in thirteen appearances.

== International career ==
Wise made his England debut on 1 May 1991 and scored the game's only goal as England defeated Turkey in a Euro 92 qualifying match at the İzmir Atatürk Stadium. Following a good season, Wise was expected to be included in the final squad for the 1996 European Championships held in England but just missed out on a place in Terry Venables' squad. Despite leading Chelsea to victories in the 1998 Football League Cup Final and the 1998 UEFA Cup Winners' Cup Final, Wise was passed over by former Chelsea manager Glenn Hoddle for a place in the England squad at the 1998 FIFA World Cup.

He earned a recall to the England team in 1999, after four years away from the national setup, playing in the match against Belgium. He followed this up with an impressive performance against Argentina on 23 February 2000, as the sides drew 0–0 at Wembley.

He featured in three of the four friendly matches for England in the build-up to the Euro 2000 tournament in the Netherlands and Belgium and was subsequently included in the final squad by manager Kevin Keegan. He came on as a second-half substitute for Steve McManaman in England's first match on 12 June 2000, his first competitive international in almost nine years, but England threw away a 2–0 lead and were defeated 2–3 by Portugal. He started England's next match against Germany and was praised for his part in the 1–0 win, England's first over Germany in a major tournament since the final of the 1966 World Cup. He started England's final group game against Romania as well, but was replaced by Nick Barmby at half-time as the Three Lions fell 2–3 to a late Ionel Ganea penalty kick and were eliminated.

Following Euro 2000, Wise played the full ninety minutes against winners France at the Stade de France in Paris on 2 September as the sides drew 1–1. His final cap for England came in a 0–0 World Cup qualifying match against Finland on 11 October 2000.

== Managerial career ==
=== Swindon Town ===
On 22 May 2006, Wise was appointed Swindon Town player-manager on a three-year contract, with ex-Chelsea teammate Gus Poyet as his assistant. He won six out of seven games and topped the League Two table with 18 points after a 2–0 away win against Chester City on 1 September. He was awarded the Manager of the Month award for August.

On 24 October, Wise left Swindon to join Leeds United, leaving the club third in the league, with thirty-one points from fifteen games.

=== Leeds United ===
On 20 September 2006, Wise was linked with the vacant Leeds United managerial post, following the sacking of Kevin Blackwell. On 21 October, Swindon gave Wise and Poyet, permission to speak to Leeds, following their request. However, talks broke down between the clubs when they were unable to agree a suitable financial package and on 23 October, Swindon withdrew permission for Leeds to talk with the pair; in a bid to keep hold of them, the club offered them both significantly improved terms. Later that day, Swindon confirmed that they had reached a suitable financial settlement package with Leeds for Wise and Poyet and that they looked set to join. Following the successful negotiation of acceptable compensation in line with the expectations of Swindon Town, on 24 October, Wise, Poyet and Andrew Beasley joined Leeds United as manager, assistant manager and goalkeeping coach respectively.

On the evening of his arrival, Wise watched from the stands at Elland Road as Leeds lost 3–1 in the League Cup against fellow Championship side Southend United. He received a standing ovation from fans and in a press conference unveiling him to the media, he said that he believed that it did not matter that he formerly played for Chelsea. In the interview he stated that he aimed to bring Leeds back into the Premiership. Wise took over with the club second from bottom of the Championship and in a difficult financial position.

Wise's first game in charge came four days later, against Southend at Elland Road again, in a 2–0 league win. However, they continued to struggle for the remainder of the season under Wise and relegation was confirmed on 4 May 2007 with only one game remaining, when the Football League gave the club a 10-point penalty for going into administration. Leeds finished bottom of the league and they were relegated to League One for the first time in their history. Nonetheless, chairman Ken Bates retained Wise for the 2007–08 season.

On 4 August, Leeds were granted their golden share, but they were given another penalty, this time 15 points, after administrators KPMG refused to resurrect the CVA for the 'old' Leeds United company. Despite this, they made an excellent start, winning their first 7 league games and Wise was named as manager of the month for both August and September. However, on 29 October 2007, Poyet left Leeds to become Juande Ramos's assistant at Tottenham Hotspur. Three days later, Wise's ex-manager at Wimbledon, Dave Bassett, became his number two. The partnership did not start well and Leeds finally lost their unbeaten record, losing 3–1 to Carlisle United at Brunton Park on 3 November.

Leeds briefly topped the table on 26 December 2007, after drawing 1–1 in an early kick-off against Hartlepool United at the Victoria Ground, and they went into 2008 third in the league. Wise left the club on 28 January 2008 in a surprise move to take up a role at Newcastle United, his last game in charge being a 1–1 draw against Luton Town at Kenilworth Road on 26 January.

== Executive roles ==
=== Newcastle United ===
On 29 January 2008, Newcastle United announced that Wise would be joining the club as Executive Director (Football), an advisor to the board on footballing matters, reporting directly to the club chairman Chris Mort. Although speculated to be in the role of Director of Football or General Manager, the job is thought to be more restricted, involving transfers, scouting and youth development, alongside simultaneous appointment of Tony Jimenez as Vice-President (Player Recruitment) and Jeff Vetere as Technical Co-ordinator, following the earlier shock return of first team manager Kevin Keegan. Keegan had previously expressed disquiet with the concept of a Director of Football, both in commenting about the previous Newcastle manager Sam Allardyce, and latterly the proposition of Newcastle owner Mike Ashley appointing one during his tenure at the club.

Wise's role, as stated by Ashley, was to be a '"football-related" executive director'. In a February 2008 interview, Mort revealed that Newcastle had "heard on the grapevine" that Wise was considering a "move upstairs". Wise was selected as his relative youth and being a "bundle of energy" suited the new role that would involve "travelling around Europe and further afield". Wise, with Vetere, was tasked with helping identify young players for approval by first team manager Kevin Keegan. Wise's role would also entail him helping develop the academy.

The departure of Keegan from the club, on 4 September, saw Wise, Jimenez (who left the club on 9 October) and club owner Ashley come under mounting pressure from the club's supporters to quit. Wise left Newcastle on 1 April 2009. Following the situation that led to his departure, Wise admitted that "it has all had a damaging effect on my career".

=== Como 1907 ===
On 9 May 2019, the Italian team Como 1907 entrusted him with the role of technical consultant on behalf of SENT Entertainment, the consortium that had taken over the club a few months earlier. In February 2021 he rose to the role of sole administrator, replacing Michael Gandler. Wise left the club in July 2024.

== Bibliography ==
Wise published his autobiography, Dennis Wise: The Autobiography, in 1999.

== Career statistics ==
=== Club ===
Appearances and goals by club, season and competition
Club	Season	League			FA Cup		League Cup		Europe		Other		Total	
Club	Season	Division	Apps	Goals	Apps	Goals	Apps	Goals	Apps	Goals	Apps	Goals	Apps	Goals
Wimbledon	1984–85	Second Division	1	0	0	0	0	0	—		—		1	0
Wimbledon	1985–86	Second Division	4	0	0	0	0	0	—		—		4	0
Wimbledon	1986–87	First Division	28	4	1	1	2	0	—		—		31	4
Wimbledon	1987–88	First Division	30	10	6	2	2	0	—		—		38	12
Wimbledon	1988–89	First Division	37	5	3	1	5	0	—		1 (Note: Appearance in FA Charity Shield)	0	46	6
Wimbledon	1989–90	First Division	35	8	1	0	5	0	—		—		41	8
Wimbledon	Total		135	27	11	4	14	0	—		1	0	161	31
Chelsea	1990–91	First Division	33	10	1	0	7	2	—		1 (Note: Appearances in Full Members' Cup)	1	42	12
Chelsea	1991–92	First Division	38	10	4	2	2	1	—		4	1	48	13
Chelsea	1992–93	Premier League	27	3	0	0	5	1	—		—		32	4
Chelsea	1993–94	Premier League	35	4	4	0	2	2	—		—		41	6
Chelsea	1994–95	Premier League	19	6	2	0	3	0	5 (Note: Appearances in UEFA Cup Winners' Cup)	1	—		29	7
Chelsea	1995–96	Premier League	35	7	7	1	2	0	—		—		44	8
Chelsea	1996–97	Premier League	31	3	7	3	2	0	—		—		40	6
Chelsea	1997–98	Premier League	26	3	0	0	4	0	9	0	1	0	40	3
Chelsea	1998–99	Premier League	22	0	5	1	2	0	8	1	1 (Note: Appearance in UEFA Super Cup)	0	38	2
Chelsea	1999–2000	Premier League	30	4	5	2	0	0	15 (Note: Appearances in UEFA Champions League)	4	—		50	9
Chelsea	2000–01	Premier League	36	3	3	0	1	0	1 (Note: Appearances in UEFA Cup)	0	1	0	42	3
Chelsea	Total		332	53	38	9	30	6	38	6	8	2	446	76
Leicester City	2001–02	Premier League	17	1	1	0	1	0	—		—		19	1
Millwall	2002–03	First Division	29	3	0	0	0	0	—		—		29	3
Millwall	2003–04	First Division	31	1	4	0	0	0	—		—		35	1
Millwall	2004–05	Championship	25	3	0	0	0	0	2	2	—		27	5
Millwall	Total		85	7	4	0	0	0	2	2	—		91	9
Southampton	2005–06	Championship	11	1	0	0	1	0	—		—		12	1
Coventry City	2005–06	Championship	13	6	0	0	0	0	—		—		13	6
Career total			593	95	59	11	46	6	40	8	9	0	747	120

=== International ===
Score and result list England's goal tally first, score column indicates score after Wise goal.

International goal scored by Dennis Wise
No.	Date	Venue	Opponent	Score	Result	Competition
1	1 May 1991	İzmir Atatürk Stadium, İzmir, Turkey	Turkey	1–0	1–0	UEFA Euro 1992 qualifying

== Managerial statistics ==
As of 28 January 2008

Team	Nat	From	To					
Team	Nat	From	To	P	W	D	L	Win %
Millwall	(England)	15 October 2003	9 May 2005	89	36	24	29	40.45
Swindon Town	(England)	22 May 2006	24 October 2006	17	9	5	3	52.94
Leeds United	(England)	24 October 2006	28 January 2008	69	30	12	27	43.48
Total				175	75	41	59	42.9

Include all League, Cup & European first team fixtures.

== Honours ==
=== Player ===
Wimbledon

- FA Cup: 1987–88

Chelsea

- FA Cup: 1996–97, 1999–2000; runner-up: 1993–94
- Football League Cup: 1997–98
- FA Charity Shield: 2000
- UEFA Cup Winners' Cup: 1997–98
- UEFA Super Cup: 1998

Millwall

- FA Cup runner-up: 2003–04 (as player-manager)

Individual

- Chelsea Player of the Year: 1997–98, 1999–2000
- Alan Hardaker Trophy: 1998

=== Manager ===
Individual

- Football League One Manager of the Month: August 2007, September 2007
- Football League Two Manager of the Month: August 2006

Sporting positions
Preceded by Andy Townsend	Chelsea F.C. captain 1993–2001	Succeeded by Marcel Desailly
