= 2004–05 Millwall F.C. season =

Millwall
2004–05 season
- Chairman: Theo Paphitis
- Manager: Dennis Wise (player-manager)
- Stadium: The Den
- Championship: 10th
- FA Cup: Third round
- League Cup: Third round
- UEFA Cup: First round
- Top goalscorer: League: Barry Hayles (12); All: Barry Hayles (12)
- Average home league attendance: 11,656

During the 2004–05 English football season, Millwall competed in the Football League Championship.

== Season summary ==
In the UEFA Cup, Millwall lost 4–2 on aggregate in the first round proper, to Hungarian Champions Ferencváros, with Wise scoring both Millwall goals. Millwall put up a brave fight in both games, but the Hungarian champions were too strong. Surprisingly, whilst Millwall were seeded, Ferencvaros were not. Millwall could have had an easier draw, against Chechnyan minnows Terek Grozny. If Millwall had beaten them, then they would have made it into the group stage of the competition, where they would have faced some of Europe's elite, including teams such as Lazio and Schalke.

In 2005, Theo Paphitis announced that he was stepping down as chairman of the club with Jeff Burnige to replace him from May 2005. At the end of the 2004–05 season, manager Dennis Wise announced that he was leaving as he was unable to form a working relationship with the new chairman.

== Final league table ==
| Pos | Team | Pld | W | D | L | GF | GA | GD | Pts |
|---|---|---|---|---|---|---|---|---|---|
| 8 | Sheffield United | 46 | 18 | 13 | 15 | 57 | 56 | +1 | 67 |
| 9 | Wolverhampton Wanderers | 46 | 15 | 21 | 10 | 72 | 59 | +13 | 66 |
| 10 | Millwall | 46 | 18 | 12 | 16 | 51 | 45 | +6 | 66 |
| 11 | Queens Park Rangers | 46 | 17 | 11 | 18 | 54 | 58 | −4 | 62 |
| 12 | Stoke City | 46 | 17 | 10 | 19 | 36 | 38 | −2 | 61 |

Updated to match(es) played on 9 December 2011. Source: Football League Tables
Rules for classification: 1) points; 2) goal difference; 3) number of goals scored.

== Results ==
Millwall's score comes first

=== Legend ===
| Win | Draw | Loss |

=== Football League Championship table ===
| Date | Opponent | Venue | Result | Attendance | Scorers |
|---|---|---|---|---|---|
| 7 August 2004 | Plymouth Argyle | A | 0–0 | 16,063 | |
| 10 August 2004 | Wigan Athletic | H | 0–2 | 10,660 | |
| 14 August 2004 | Leicester City | H | 2–0 | 11,754 | Morris, Dichio |
| 21 August 2004 | Coventry City | A | 1–0 | 13,910 | Dichio |
| 28 August 2004 | Reading | H | 1–0 | 12,098 | Dichio |
| 12 September 2004 | Ipswich Town | A | 0–2 | 21,246 | |
| 19 September 2004 | Watford | H | 0–2 | 10,865 | |
| 22 September 2004 | Derby County | H | 3–1 | 23,422 | Wise, Simpson, Ifill |
| 25 September 2004 | Rotherham United | A | 1–1 | 5,062 | Ifill |
| 3 October 2004 | Nottingham Forest | H | 1–0 | 11,233 | Livermore |
| 16 October 2004 | Sunderland | A | 0–1 | 23,839 | |
| 19 October 2004 | Gillingham | H | 2–1 | 10,722 | Hayles, Dunne |
| 23 October 2004 | Cardiff City | H | 2–2 | 10,476 | Tessem, Harris |
| 30 October 2004 | Stoke City | A | 0–1 | 14,125 | |
| 2 November 2004 | Queens Park Rangers | A | 1–1 | 16,685 | Hayles |
| 5 November 2004 | Sunderland | H | 2–0 | 10,513 | Wise (pen), Livermore |
| 13 November 2004 | Preston North End | A | 1–1 | 22,977 | Hayles |
| 21 November 2004 | West Ham United | H | 1–0 | 15,025 | Dichio |
| 27 November 2004 | Burnley | A | 0–1 | 11,471 | |
| 30 November 2004 | Crewe Alexandra | A | 1–2 | 5,409 | Ifill |
| 4 December 2004 | Sheffield United | H | 1–2 | 11,207 | Phillips |
| 7 December 2004 | Wolverhampton Wanderers | A | 2–1 | 24,748 | Dobie, Dichio |
| 11 December 2004 | Brighton & Hove Albion | H | 2–0 | 12,196 | Dobie, Ifill |
| 18 December 2004 | Leeds United | A | 1–1 | 26,265 | Morris (pen) |
| 26 December 2004 | Ipswich Town | H | 3–1 | 14,532 | Hayles, Dichio, Dobie |
| 28 December 2004 | Derby County | A | 3–0 | 27,725 | Hayles (3) |
| 1 January 2005 | Watford | A | 0–1 | 13,158 | |
| 3 January 2005 | Rotherham United | H | 1–2 | 11,725 | Dunne |
| 15 January 2005 | Nottingham Forest | A | 2–1 | 25,949 | Hayles, Dunne |
| 22 January 2005 | Wolverhampton Wanderers | H | 1–2 | 13,145 | Wise (pen) |
| 5 February 2005 | Queens Park Rangers | H | 0–0 | 15,603 | |
| 12 February 2005 | Gillingham | A | 0–0 | 9,127 | |
| 19 February 2005 | Stoke City | H | 0–1 | 11,036 | |
| 22 February 2005 | Cardiff City | A | 1–0 | 11,424 | Dichio (pen) |
| 26 February 2005 | Brighton & Hove Albion | A | 0–1 | 6,608 | |
| 6 March 2005 | Leeds United | H | 1–1 | 11,510 | Robinson |
| 12 March 2005 | Wigan Athletic | A | 0–2 | 18,647 | |
| 15 March 2005 | Coventry City | H | 1–1 | 8,835 | Morris (pen) |
| 20 March 2005 | Plymouth Argyle | H | 3–0 | 11,465 | Sweeney, Hayles, Dichio |
| 2 April 2005 | Leicester City | A | 1–3 | 22,338 | Dichio |
| 5 April 2005 | Reading | A | 1–2 | 14,379 | Dichio |
| 9 April 2005 | Crewe Alexandra | H | 4–3 | 10,767 | Hayles, Elliott, Morris, May (pen) |
| 16 April 2005 | West Ham United | A | 1–1 | 28,221 | Hayles |
| 24 April 2005 | Preston North End | H | 2–1 | 11,417 | Sweeney, Hayles |
| 30 April 2005 | Sheffield United | A | 1–0 | 19,797 | Morris |
| 8 May 2005 | Burnley | H | 0–0 | 12,171 | |

=== FA Cup ===
| Round | Date | Opponent | Venue | Result | Attendance | Goalscorers |
|---|---|---|---|---|---|---|
| R3 | 8 January 2005 | Wolverhampton Wanderers | A | 0–2 | 12,566 | |

=== League Cup ===
| Round | Date | Opponent | Venue | Result | Attendance | Goalscorers |
|---|---|---|---|---|---|---|
| R3 | 26 October 2004 | Liverpool | H | 0–3 | 17,655 | |

=== UEFA Cup ===
| Round | Date | Opponent | Venue | Result | Attendance | Goalscorers |
|---|---|---|---|---|---|---|
| R1 First Leg | 16 September 2004 | Ferencváros | H | 1–1 | 11,667 | Wise |
| R1 Second Leg | 30 September 2004 | Ferencváros | A | 1–3 | 15,229 | Wise |

== Players ==
=== First-team squad ===
Squad at end of season

Note: Flags indicate national team as defined under FIFA eligibility rules; some limited exceptions apply. Players may hold more than one non-FIFA nationality.

| No. | Pos. | Nation | Player |
|---|---|---|---|
| 1 | GK | IRL | Graham Stack (Note: Stack was born in Camden, England, but also qualified to represent the Republic of Ireland internationally and represented the Republic of Ireland at U-21 level.) (on loan from Arsenal) |
| 2 | DF | ENG | Matthew Lawrence |
| 5 | DF | CAN | Adrian Serioux |
| 6 | DF | NIR | Joe Dolan (Note: Dolan was born in Southwark, England, but also qualified to represent Northern Ireland internationally and represented Northern Ireland at U-18 and U-21 level.) |
| 7 | MF | BRB | Paul Ifill (Note: Ifill was born in Brighton, England, but also qualified to represent Barbados internationally through his parents and made his international debut for Barbados in June 2004.) |
| 8 | MF | ENG | David Livermore |
| 10 | FW | ENG | Danny Dichio |
| 12 | DF | ENG | Darren Ward |
| 13 | GK | ENG | Andy Marshall |
| 14 | MF | ENG | Curtis Weston |
| 15 | MF | CAN | Josh Simpson |
| 17 | DF | AUS | Kevin Muscat (Note: Muscat was born in Crawley, England, but was raised in Australia and represented Australia at U-20 and U-23 level before making his international debut for Australia in September 1994.) |
| 19 | MF | ENG | Dennis Wise (player-manager) |
| 20 | MF | ENG | Jody Morris |
| 21 | FW | JAM | Barry Hayles (Note: Hayles was born in Lambeth, England, but also qualified to represent Jamaica internationally and made his international debut for Jamaica in June 2001, having previously represented the Cayman Islands internationally despite being ineligible to do so.) |

| No. | Pos. | Nation | Player |
|---|---|---|---|
| 22 | FW | NIR | Kevin Braniff |
| 24 | MF | ENG | Andy Impey (on loan from Nottingham Forest) |
| 25 | MF | ENG | Marvin Elliott (Note: Elliott was born in Wandsworth, England, but also qualified to represent Jamaica internationally and made his international debut for Jamaica in October 2011.) |
| 26 | MF | SCO | Peter Sweeney |
| 27 | DF | IRL | Alan Dunne |
| 28 | DF | ENG | Mark Phillips |
| 29 | FW | BEL | Bob Peeters |
| 32 | FW | ENG | Ben May |
| 33 | FW | ENG | Joe Healy |
| 34 | DF | ENG | Paul Robinson |
| 35 | DF | ENG | Tony Craig |
| 37 | MF | IRL | Barry Cogan |
| 38 | MF | JAM | Trevor Robinson |
| 39 | FW | IRL | Mark Quigley |
| 41 | MF | ENG | Anton Robinson |

=== Left club during season ===
Note: Flags indicate national team as defined under FIFA eligibility rules; some limited exceptions apply. Players may hold more than one non-FIFA nationality.

| No. | Pos. | Nation | Player |
|---|---|---|---|
| 4 | FW | NOR | Jo Tessem (on loan from Southampton) |
| 9 | FW | ENG | Neil Harris (on loan from Nottingham Forest) |
| 11 | FW | ENG | Stefan Moore (on loan from Aston Villa) |
| 11 | FW | SCO | Scott Dobie (Note: Dobie was born in Workington, England, but also qualified to represent Scotland internationally and made his international debut for Scotland in May 2002.) (to Nottingham Forest) |

| No. | Pos. | Nation | Player |
|---|---|---|---|
| 23 | FW | ENG | Mark McCammon (Note: McCammon was born in Barnet, England, but also qualified to represent Barbados internationally and made his international debut for Barbados in 2006.) (to Brighton & Hove Albion) |
| 36 | DF | IRL | Tim Clancy (to Fisher Athletic) |
| 42 | DF | ENG | James Donovan (to Crawley Town) |

=== Reserve squad ===
Note: Flags indicate national team as defined under FIFA eligibility rules; some limited exceptions apply. Players may hold more than one non-FIFA nationality.

| No. | Pos. | Nation | Player |
|---|---|---|---|
| 30 | MF | ENG | Charley Hearn |
| 31 | GK | IRL | Terry Masterson |

| No. | Pos. | Nation | Player |
|---|---|---|---|
| 43 | MF | ENG | Will Hendry |
