= Michael Duberry =

English footballer

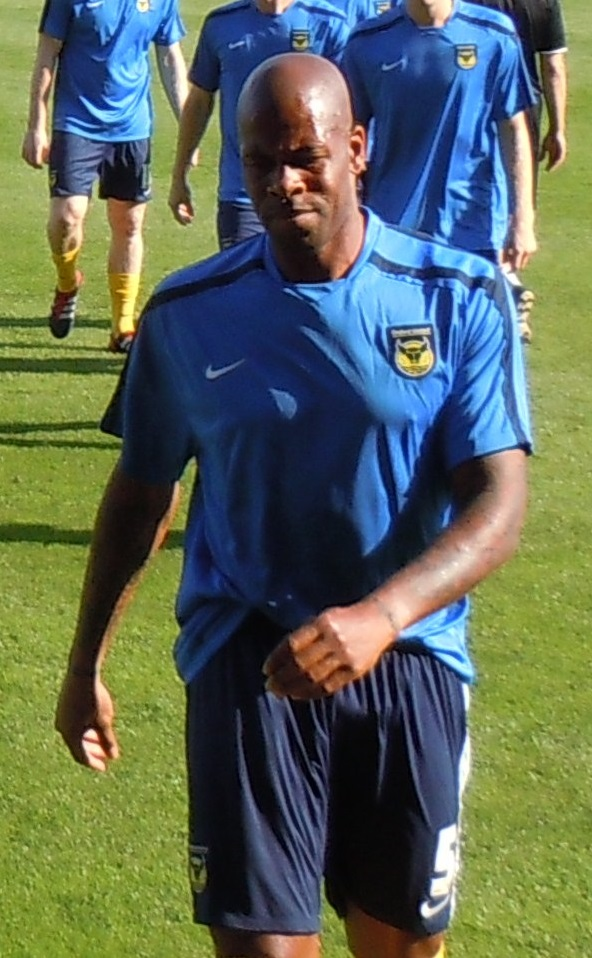
- Duberry in 2011

Personal information
- Full name: Michael Wayne Duberry
- Date of birth: 14 October 1975 (age 51)
- Place of birth: Enfield, England
- Height: 6 ft 1 in (1.85 m)
- Position: Centre-back

Youth career
- 1991–1993: Chelsea

Senior career*
Years	Team	Apps	(Gls)
1993–1999	Chelsea	87	(1)
1995	→ Bournemouth (loan)	7	(0)
1999–2005	Leeds United	57	(4)
2004–2005	→ Stoke City (loan)	15	(0)
2005–2007	Stoke City	80	(1)
2007–2009	Reading	48	(0)
2009–2010	Wycombe Wanderers	18	(0)
2010–2011	St Johnstone	50	(1)
2011–2013	Oxford United	47	(3)
2013	Hendon	4	(0)
Total		413	(10)

International career
1996–1997	England U21	5	(1)
- * Club domestic league appearances and goals

Michael Wayne Duberry (born 14 October 1975) is an English former professional footballer who played as a centre-back.

He started his career with Premier League side Chelsea, and also played in the top flight for Leeds United and Reading, and in the Scottish Premier League for St Johnstone. He also played in the Football League for Bournemouth, Stoke City, Wycombe Wanderers and Oxford United before finishing his career with non-League football club Hendon.

== Club career ==
=== Chelsea ===
Duberry attended Enfield Grammar School in his hometown of Enfield, London, and started his career at Chelsea where he was a trainee and made his debut during the 1993–94 season, before a brief loan period with Bournemouth. Duberry made a total of 115 appearances for Chelsea and scored 3 goals, including one in a 2–1 win over Manchester United at Old Trafford in November 1996. His two other Chelsea goals came in their 1995–96 FA Cup campaign, with goals against Grimsby Town and Wimbledon. He won the League Cup, the UEFA Cup Winners' Cup and the European Super Cup with Chelsea, all in 1998, but faced stiff competition for a place in the side from the likes of Marcel Desailly and Frank Leboeuf. Duberry picked up an Achilles tendon injury in January 1997 meaning he missed the rest of that season, including the 1997 FA Cup Final.

=== Leeds United ===
Seeking regular football, Duberry eventually requested a transfer and moved to Leeds United in June 1999 for £4.5 million. However, he again failed to break into the first team, as the likes of Jonathan Woodgate, Dominic Matteo, Lucas Radebe and Rio Ferdinand took Leeds to the Champions League semi-finals. He did play the full 90 minutes of their memorable 1–0 win over AC Milan at Elland Road during that campaign; however, this would prove to be his last appearance of that season in any competition. He was involved in a court case with Leeds teammates Jonathan Woodgate and Lee Bowyer. The first season in which he played regularly for Leeds was 2003–04, as by this time Lucas Radebe had become increasingly injury-prone and crippling debt had forced the sales of Ferdinand and Woodgate. However, Duberry failed to impress in a defence often made up of loan signings (such as Zoumana Camara and Didier Domi) and then youth-team players (such as Frazer Richardson and Matthew Kilgallon).

=== Stoke City ===
When Leeds were relegated to the Football League he stayed on for a season until Leeds manager Kevin Blackwell allowed him to move to Stoke City where he went on to become a first-team regular and club captain. All 80 of his appearances for the club were as a starter; not once did he feature on the bench. He scored once for Stoke, in a 2–0 win over Crewe Alexandra.

=== Reading ===
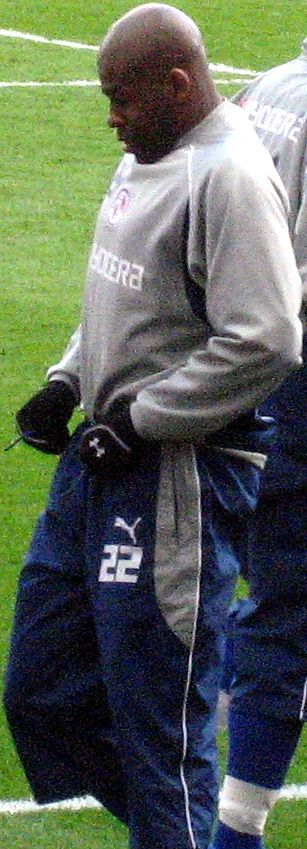
Duberry training with Reading in 2007

On 31 January 2007, Duberry signed for Reading, who invoked a clause in his contract that allowed him to leave Stoke for a Premier League club if a set fee was received, rumoured to be in the region of £800,000. He made his league debut for Reading on 24 February in a 2–1 defeat away to Middlesbrough.

=== Wycombe Wanderers ===
On 15 May 2009, Reading announced that they would not be renewing Duberry's contract, and on 10 July he signed a two-year contract with Wycombe Wanderers, being appointed club captain shortly afterwards. He was released from his contract on 1 February 2010 having seen his contract terminated by mutual consent, according to the official Wycombe Wanderers website.

=== St Johnstone ===
Four days later, Duberry signed for Scottish side St Johnstone. He made his Saints debut in a 1–0 Scottish Cup defeat to Dundee United. He scored his first goal for St Johnstone in a 2–2 draw with St Mirren on 17 April 2010. Duberry re-signed a further one-year deal with the club on 27 May.

=== Oxford United ===
Duberry joined Oxford United on 1 June 2011 on a two-year deal, to be closer to his family. He scored his first goal for the club, in a 2–1 victory over Port Vale, on 29 October. On 21 January 2012, Duberry scored two own goals followed by a last-minute equaliser as Oxford drew 2–2 with Hereford United. In August, 36-year-old Duberry underwent neck surgery in an attempt to prolong his career, and stated his hopes of a return to fitness within four months. He made two substitute appearances in December and returned to the starting line-up in a league fixture on 1 January 2013. During his second season at the club he became the oldest outfield player to appear in the Oxford first team, his final appearance at Accrington Stanley coming at the age of 37 years and 195 days. He was released by Oxford at the end of the 2012–13 season having made 50 appearances for the club in two seasons.

=== Hendon ===
Duberry announced that he had signed a week-to-week deal with non-League club Hendon on 9 August 2013. After just four games, and 16 days with the Greens, he was released, and announced his retirement from football on 2 October.

== International career ==
Duberry was eligible to play international football for England, through birth and Montserrat, as both his parents were born there. He stated that Ruel Fox had asked him earlier in his career if he wanted to play for the Montserrat national football team, but declined as he stated his dream was to play for England. Duberry was approached again, later in his career, whilst playing for St Johnstone. However, he declined again despite the team training in Enfield, close to where he grew up.

== Personal life ==
After retiring as a player, Duberry began Made Leaders, a mentoring, coaching and leadership business.

== Career statistics ==
Appearances and goals by club, season and competition
Club	Season	League			National cup (Note: Includes FA Cup, Scottish Cup)		League cup (Note: Includes League Cup, Scottish League Cup)		Europe		Other		Total	
Club	Season	Division	Apps	Goals	Apps	Goals	Apps	Goals	Apps	Goals	Apps	Goals	Apps	Goals
Chelsea	1993–94	Premier League	2	0	0	0	0	0	—		—		2	0
Chelsea	1994–95	Premier League	0	0	0	0	0	0	—		—		0	0
Chelsea	1995–96	Premier League	22	0	8	0	0	0	—		—		30	0
Chelsea	1996–97	Premier League	15	1	1	0	2	0	—		—		18	1
Chelsea	1997–98	Premier League	23	0	1	0	3	0	6 (Note: Appearances in UEFA Cup Winners' Cup)	0	—		33	0
Chelsea	1998–99	Premier League	25	0	2	0	3	0	2	0	1 (Note: Appearance in UEFA Super Cup)	0	33	0
Chelsea	Total		87	1	12	0	8	0	8	0	1	0	116	1
Bournemouth (loan)	1995–96	Second Division	7	0	0	0	0	0	—		—		7	0
Leeds United	1999–2000	Premier League	13	1	1	0	1	0	1 (Note: Appearance in UEFA Cup)	0	—		16	1
Leeds United	2000–01	Premier League	4	0	0	0	0	0	4 (Note: Appearances in UEFA Champions League)	0	—		8	0
Leeds United	2001–02	Premier League	3	0	1	0	2	0	1	0	—		7	0
Leeds United	2002–03	Premier League	14	0	2	0	2	0	1	0	—		19	0
Leeds United	2003–04	Premier League	19	3	1	0	0	0	0	0	—		20	3
Leeds United	2004–05	Championship	4	0	1	0	0	0	—		—		5	0
Leeds United	Total		57	4	6	0	5	0	7	0	—		75	4
Stoke City	2004–05	Championship	25	0	0	0	0	0	—		—		25	0
Stoke City	2005–06	Championship	41	1	3	0	1	0	—		—		45	1
Stoke City	2006–07	Championship	29	0	2	0	1	0	—		—		32	0
Stoke City	Total		95	1	5	0	2	0	—		—		102	1
Reading	2006–07	Premier League	8	0	0	0	0	0	—		—		8	0
Reading	2007–08	Premier League	13	0	1	0	2	0	—		—		16	0
Reading	2008–09	Championship	27	0	0	0	1	0	—		2 (Note: Appearances in Championship play-offs)	0	30	0
Reading	Total		48	0	1	0	3	0	—		2	0	54	0
Wycombe Wanderers	2009–10	League One	18	0	1	0	0	0	—		0	0	19	0
St Johnstone	2009–10	Scottish Premier League	17	1	1	0	0	0	—		—		18	1
St Johnstone	2010–11	Scottish Premier League	33	0	3	0	3	0	—		—		39	0
St Johnstone	Total		50	1	4	0	3	0	—		—		57	1
Oxford United	2011–12	League Two	36	3	0	0	1	0	—		0	0	37	3
Oxford United	2012–13	League Two	11	0	2	0	0	0	—		0	0	13	0
Oxford United	Total		47	3	2	0	1	0	—		0	0	50	3
Career total			409	10	31	0	22	0	15	0	3	0	480	10

== Honours ==
Chelsea

- Football League Cup: 1997–98
- UEFA Cup Winners' Cup: 1997–98
- UEFA Super Cup: 1998
