= Dmitri Kharine =

Russian footballer

Dmitri Kharin
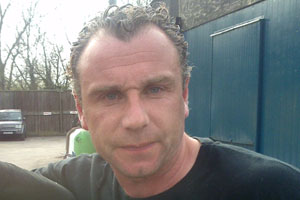
- Kharin in 2010 while goalkeeping coach for Luton Town

Personal information
- Full name: Dmitri Viktorovich Kharin
- Date of birth: 16 August 1968 (age 58)
- Place of birth: Moscow, Soviet Union
- Height: 1.88 m (6 ft 2 in)
- Position: Goalkeeper

Team information
- Current team: Hemel Hempstead (Goalkeeping Coach)

Youth career
- 1982: FShM Moscow

Senior career*
Years	Team	Apps	(Gls)
1982–1987	FC Torpedo Moscow	63	(0)
1988–1991	FC Dynamo Moscow	40	(0)
1991–1992	CSKA Moscow	34	(0)
1992–1999	Chelsea	118	(0)
1999–2002	Celtic	8	(0)
2002–2004	Hornchurch	23	(0)
Total		286	(0)

International career
1986–1988	Soviet Union (Olympic)	14	(0)
1988–1991	Soviet Union	6	(0)
1992	CIS	11	(0)
1992–1998	Russia	23	(0)
Medal record
Representing Soviet Union
Men's Football
Gold medal – first place	1988 Seoul	Team competition
- * Club domestic league appearances and goals

Dmitri Viktorovich Kharin (Russian: Дми́трий Ви́кторович Ха́рин; born 16 August 1968) is a Russian football coach and former professional footballer, who is goalkeeping coach of National League South side Hemel Hempstead Town.

As a player, he was a goalkeeper from 1982 until 2004, notably in the Premier League for Chelsea, after playing for Moscow clubs Torpedo, Dynamo and CSKA. He finished his professional career in the Scottish Premier League with Celtic, before returning to England to play for non-league Hornchurch. He earned international caps for the USSR, CIS and the Russian national football teams.

Kharin joined Luton Town in 2004 as goalkeeping coach, and remained with the club until 2013, later joining Stevenage and Hemel Hempstead Town in a similar capacity.

== Club career ==
=== Russian football ===
He played for Russian sides Torpedo Moscow, Dynamo Moscow and CSKA Moscow in the early part of his career, before moving to English FA Premier League club Chelsea in December 1992 for £400,000.

=== Chelsea ===
With Chelsea, Kharin impressed in their run to the 1994 FA Cup Final – though he conceded four goals in the final itself – and then the club's UEFA Cup Winners' Cup run a year later, where they reached the semi-finals in their first European campaign since the 1970s. His later years at the club were blighted by injury problems and the signing of Dutch goalkeeper Ed de Goey, which limited him to 20 appearances in his last three seasons. In total, he played in 146 games for Chelsea.

Kharin was not fit for inclusion in Chelsea's FA Cup Final triumph at the end of the 1996–97 season (Norwegian Frode Grodås played instead), and was not chosen in the squad for the Cup Winners' Cup and League Cup final victories a year later. When Gianluca Vialli became Chelsea manager he established de Goey as the club's first choice goalkeeper; Kharin was limited to five appearances that season, mainly in cup games. He remained at the club as a reserve goalkeeper for a further two seasons after this.

=== Celtic ===
Kharin signed for Scottish side Celtic in the summer of 1999 on a free transfer. He arrived at Celtic Park as the first signing of new management team John Barnes and Kenny Dalglish, but injury problems ensured that he played just 11 games for the club (8 in the league).

=== Hornchurch ===
He was released in the summer of 2002 and signed for non-League club Hornchurch, where he was sent off on his debut.

== International career ==
Kharin was also an international; as a result of the political turmoil in his home nation, he ended up playing for three different teams. He won six caps for the USSR, eleven for the CIS and then 23 for Russia. Aided in part by the short-lived nature of the CIS, he was their most-capped player. He represented the Soviet Union at the 1988 Summer Olympics, winning a gold medal in the football competition. He played for the CIS at the 1992 European Championships, performing well in the 0–0 draw with the Netherlands in Gothenburg; and for Russia at USA 94 and Euro 96, with his team going out in the group stages on each occasion. He won his last cap in September 1998 against Ukraine.

== Coaching career ==
Kharin joined Luton Town in 2004 as the club's goalkeeping coach. He remained with the club until 2013 when he was released from his contract. Kharin then joined fellow League Two side Stevenage until he left in 2015 shortly after Teddy Sheringham had left. Kharin is now the goalkeeping coach at Hemel Hempstead Town.

== Personal life ==
His younger brother Mikhail Kharin played football professionally as well. Mikhail's son Filipp Kharin is now also a professional goalkeeper.

== Career achievements ==
Dmitri Kharin achieved the following successes during his football career: 1985 U'16 European Champion, 1986 USSR Cup Winner, 1988 Olympic Champion, 1990 U'21 European Champion, 1991 USSR League Champion, 1992 Runner's Up Russian Cup & 1994 Runner's Up F.A. Cup.

== Career statistics ==
=== Club ===
As of end of 2001–02 season

Appearances and goals by club, season and competition
Club	Season	League			National Cup		League Cup		Continental		Other		Total	
Club	Season	Division	Apps	Goals	Apps	Goals	Apps	Goals	Apps	Goals	Apps	Goals	Apps	Goals
Torpedo Moscow	1984	Soviet Top League	1	0			—		—		—		1	0
Torpedo Moscow	1985	Soviet Top League	10	0			—		—		—		10	0
Torpedo Moscow	1986	Soviet Top League	25	0			—		—		—		25	0
Torpedo Moscow	1987	Soviet Top League	27	0			—		—		—		27	0
Torpedo Moscow	Total		63	0			-	-	-	-	-	-	40	0
Dynamo Moscow	1988	Soviet Top League	19	0			—		—		—		19	0
Dynamo Moscow	1989	Soviet Top League	20	0			—		—		—		20	0
Dynamo Moscow	1990	Soviet Top League	1	0			—		—		—		1	0
Dynamo Moscow	1991	Soviet Top League	0	0			—		0	0	—		0	0
Dynamo Moscow	Total		40	0			-	-	0	0	-	-	63	0
CSKA Moscow	1991	Soviet Top League	11	0			—		2	0	—		13	0
CSKA Moscow	1992	Russian Top League	23	0	1	0	—		5	0	—		29	0
CSKA Moscow	Total		34	0	1	0	-	-	7	0	-	-	42	0
Chelsea	1992–93	Premier League	5	0	0	0	0	0	—		—		5	0
Chelsea	1993–94	Premier League	40	0	8	0	3	0	—		—		51	0
Chelsea	1994–95	Premier League	31	0	3	0	3	0	4	0	—		41	0
Chelsea	1995–96	Premier League	26	0	1	0	2	0	—		—		29	0
Chelsea	1996–97	Premier League	5	0	0	0	0	0	—		—		5	0
Chelsea	1997–98	Premier League	10	0	0	0	0	0	0	0	—		10	0
Chelsea	1998–99	Premier League	1	0	0	0	3	0	1	0	—		5	0
Chelsea	Total		118	0	12	0	11	0	5	0	-	-	146	0
Celtic	1999–2000	Scottish Premier League	4	0	0	0	1	0	1	0	—		6	0
Celtic	2000–01	Scottish Premier League	1	0	0	0	0	0	0	0	—		1	0
Celtic	2001–02	Scottish Premier League	3	0	0	0	1	0	0	0	—		4	0
Celtic	Total		8	0	0	0	2	0	1	0	-	-	11	0
Hornchurch	2002–03	Isthmian League Division One North					—		—					0
Hornchurch	2003–04	Isthmian League Division One North					—		—					0
Hornchurch	Total						-	-	-	-				
Career total			263	0	13	0	13	0	13	0			302	0

=== International ===
Statistics accurate as of match played 5 September 1998

Soviet Union
Year	Apps	Goals
1988	3	0
1989	2	0
1990	0	0
1991	1	0
Total	6	0

CIS
Year	Apps	Goals
1992	9	0
Total	9	0

Russia
Year	Apps	Goals
1993	4	0
1994	6	0
1995	5	0
1996	6	0
1997	0	0
1998	2	0
Total	23	0

== Honours ==
Chelsea

- Football League Cup: 1997–98
- UEFA Cup Winners' Cup: 1997–98
- UEFA Super Cup: 1998
- FA Cup runner-up: 1993–94

Celtic

- Scottish Premier League: 2000–01, 2001–02
- Scottish Cup: 2000–01
- Scottish League Cup: 1999–00, 2000–01

Soviet Union

- Olympic Champion: 1988
