= Mikhail Kharin =

Russian footballer and coach

Personal information
- Full name: Mikhail Viktorovich Kharin
- Date of birth: 17 June 1976 (age 50)
- Place of birth: Moscow, Russian SFSR
- Height: 1.88 m (6 ft 2 in)
- Position: Goalkeeper

Senior career*
Years	Team	Apps	(Gls)
1992–1998	FC Torpedo-d Moscow	122	(0)
1996	FC Torpedo-Luzhniki Moscow	2	(0)
1998	FC Torpedo Vladimir	30	(0)
1999	FC Torpedo-2 Moscow	19	(0)

International career
1994–1998	Russia U-21	5	(0)
1995	Russia U-20	3	(0)

Managerial career
- 2004–2008: FC Moscow (academy)
- 2008–2013: FC Lokomotiv Moscow (academy)
- 2013: FC Lokomotiv-2 Moscow (gk. coach)
- 2014–2015: FC Torpedo Moscow (assistant)
- * Club domestic league appearances and goals

Mikhail Viktorovich Kharin (Russian: Михаил Викторович Харин; born 17 June 1976) is a Russian professional football coach and a former player.

== International career ==
Kharin represented Russia at the 1995 FIFA World Youth Championship and the 1998 UEFA European Under-21 Championship.

== Personal life ==
He is the younger brother of Dmitri Kharine and father of Filipp Kharin.
