= 1996–97 Chelsea F.C. season =

English football club season

Chelsea F.C.
1996–97 season
- Chairman: Ken Bates
- Manager: Ruud Gullit
- FA Premier League: 6th
- FA Cup: Winners
- League Cup: Third round
- Top goalscorer: League: Gianluca Vialli (9); All: Mark Hughes (14)
- Highest home attendance: 28,418 vs Everton (7 December 1996, FA Premier League)
- Lowest home attendance: 11,732 vs Blackpool (25 September 1996, League Cup)
- Average home league attendance: 27,001
Home colours	Away colours

During the 1996–97 English football season, Chelsea competed in the FA Premier League.

== Season summary ==
With Glenn Hoddle leaving to become England manager, Chelsea gave the managerial role to midfielder Ruud Gullit. Gullit would use his continental connections to bring in world-class international players such as France center-back Frank Leboeuf, and Italian superstars such as midfielder Roberto Di Matteo, Parma's playmaker Gianfranco Zola and the Champions League winning striker and Juventus captain Gianluca Vialli. Gullit had a dream start to his managerial career as Chelsea won the FA Cup with a 2–0 win over Middlesbrough, ending Chelsea's 26-year trophy drought and making him the first foreign manager and first black manager to win a major trophy with an English club.

Zola was voted FWA Footballer of the Year after a brilliant first season at Stamford Bridge in which he scored 12 goals and contributed many assists, while fellow countryman and record £4.5 million signing Roberto Di Matteo scored one of Chelsea's goals in the triumphant Wembley final.

The club suffered a tragedy in late October when director Matthew Harding was killed in a helicopter crash in Cheshire when returning home from the club's League Cup exit at Bolton.

== Final league table ==
Pos	Team	Pld	W	D	L	GF	GA	GD	Pts	Qualification or relegation
4	Liverpool	38	19	11	8	62	37	+25	68	Qualification for the UEFA Cup first round (Note: Aston Villa was rewarded entry to the UEFA Cup through UEFA Fair Play ranking.)
5	Aston Villa	38	17	10	11	47	34	+13	61	Qualification for the UEFA Cup first round
6	Chelsea	38	16	11	11	58	55	+3	59	Qualification for the Cup Winners' Cup first round (Note: Chelsea qualified for the Cup Winners' Cup as FA Cup winners.)
7	Sheffield Wednesday	38	14	15	9	50	51	−1	57	
8	Wimbledon	38	15	11	12	49	46	+3	56	

Source: Premier League
Rules for classification: 1) points; 2) goal difference; 3) number of goals scored.
Notes:

Results summary

Overall								Home						Away					
Pld	W	D	L	GF	GA	GD	Pts	W	D	L	GF	GA	GD	W	D	L	GF	GA	GD
38	16	11	11	58	55	+3	59	9	8	2	33	22	+11	7	3	9	25	33	−8

Source: Statto

Results by round

Round	1	2	3	4	5	6	7	8	9	10	11	12	13	14	15	16	17	18	19	20	21	22	23	24	25	26	27	28	29	30	31	32	33	34	35	36	37	38
Ground	A	H	H	A	A	H	A	H	A	H	H	A	A	H	A	H	A	H	A	H	H	A	H	A	H	A	H	A	H	H	A	H	A	A	H	A	H	A
Result	D	W	W	D	W	D	L	D	W	L	W	W	D	D	L	D	L	W	W	D	W	L	W	W	D	L	D	L	W	W	L	L	L	L	W	W	D	W
Position	11	8	2	3	2	3	7	6	6	6	6	5	5	5	7	7	7	8	7	7	7	7	6	5	6	7	8	8	7	5	6	6	7	8	7	7	6	6

Source: Statto.com
A = Away; H = Home; W = Win; D = Draw; L = Loss

== Results ==
=== Premier League ===
Date	Opponent	Venue	Result	Attendance	Scorers
18 August 1996	Southampton	A	0–0	15,186	
21 August 1996	Middlesbrough	H	1–0	28,272	Di Matteo
24 August 1996	Coventry City	H	2–0	25,024	Leboeuf, Vialli
4 September 1996	Arsenal	A	3–3	38,132	Leboeuf (pen.), Wise, Vialli
7 September 1996	Sheffield Wednesday	A	2–0	30,983	Burley, Myers
15 September 1996	Aston Villa	H	1–1	27,729	Leboeuf
21 September 1996	Liverpool	A	1–5	40,739	Leboeuf (pen.)
28 September 1996	Nottingham Forest	H	1–1	27,673	Vialli
12 October 1996	Leicester City	A	3–1	20,766	Di Matteo, M. Hughes, Vialli
19 October 1996	Wimbledon	H	2–4	28,020	Minto, Vialli (pen.)
26 October 1996	Tottenham Hotspur	H	3–1	28,373	David Lee (pen.), Gullit, Di Matteo
2 November 1996	Manchester United	A	2–1	55,198	Duberry, Vialli
16 November 1996	Blackburn Rovers	A	1–1	27,229	Petrescu
23 November 1996	Newcastle United	H	1–1	28,401	Vialli
1 December 1996	Leeds United	A	0–2	32,671	
7 December 1996	Everton	H	2–2	28,418	Zola, Vialli
15 December 1996	Sunderland	A	0–3	19,683	
21 December 1996	West Ham United	H	3–1	28,315	Zola, M. Hughes (2)
26 December 1996	Aston Villa	A	2–0	39,339	Zola (2)
28 December 1997	Sheffield Wednesday	H	2–2	27,467	Zola, M. Hughes
1 January 1997	Liverpool	H	1–0	28,329	Di Matteo
11 January 1997	Nottingham Forest	A	0–2	28,358	
18 January 1997	Derby County	H	3–1	28,293	Leboeuf (pen.), Wise, P. Hughes
1 February 1997	Tottenham Hotspur	A	2–1	33,027	Campbell (o.g.), Di Matteo
22 February 1997	Manchester United	H	1–1	28,336	Zola
1 March 1997	Derby County	A	2–3	18,039	Leboeuf, Minto
5 March 1997	Blackburn Rovers	H	1–1	25,784	Minto
12 March 1997	West Ham United	A	2–3	24,502	Vialli, M. Hughes
16 March 1997	Sunderland	H	6–2	24,027	Sinclair, Petrescu, Di Matteo, Zola, M. Hughes (2)
19 March 1997	Southampton	H	1–0	28,079	Zola
22 March 1997	Middlesbrough	A	0–1	29,811	
5 April 1997	Arsenal	H	0–3	28,182	
9 April 1997	Coventry City	A	1–3	19,917	P. Hughes
16 April 1997	Newcastle United	A	1–3	36,320	Burley
19 April 1997	Leicester City	H	2–1	27,723	Minto, M. Hughes
22 April 1997	Wimbledon	A	1–0	14,601	Petrescu
3 May 1997	Leeds United	H	0–0	26,277	
11 May 1997	Everton	A	2–1	38,321	Di Matteo, Wise

=== League Cup ===
Date	Round	Opponent	Venue	Result	Attendance	Scorers
18 September 1996	R2	Blackpool	A	4–1	9,666	Petrescu, Morris, Spencer, M. Hughes
25 September 1996	R2	Blackpool	H	1–3	11,732	Spencer
22 October 1996	R3	Bolton Wanderers	A	1–2	16,867	Minto

=== FA Cup ===
Date	Round	Opponent	Venue	Result	Attendance	Scorers
4 January 1997	R3	West Bromwich Albion	H	3–0	27,446	Wise, Zola, Burley
26 January 1997	R4	Liverpool	H	4–2	27,950	M. Hughes, Zola, Vialli (2)
16 February 1997	R5	Leicester City	A	2–2	19,125	Di Matteo, M. Hughes
26 February 1997	R5 (R)	Leicester City	H	1–0 (a.e.t.)	26,053	Leboeuf (pen.)
9 March 1997	QF	Portsmouth	A	4–1	15,701	Wise (2), Zola, M. Hughes
13 April 1997	SF	Wimbledon	N	3–0	32,674	M. Hughes (2), Zola
17 May 1997	F	Middlesbrough	N	2–0	79,160	Di Matteo, Newton

== First team squad ==
Squad at end of season

Note: Flags indicate national team as defined under FIFA eligibility rules; some limited exceptions apply. Players may hold more than one non-FIFA nationality.

No.	Pos.	Nation	Player
1	GK	RUS	Dmitri Kharine
2	DF	ROU	Dan Petrescu
4	MF	NED	Ruud Gullit
5	DF	FRA	Frank Leboeuf
6	DF	SCO	Steve Clarke
8	DF	ENG	Andy Myers
9	FW	ITA	Gianluca Vialli
10	FW	WAL	Mark Hughes
11	MF	ENG	Dennis Wise (captain)
12	DF	ENG	Michael Duberry
13	GK	ENG	Kevin Hitchcock
14	MF	SCO	Craig Burley
15	DF	ENG	David Lee
16	MF	ITA	Roberto Di Matteo

No.	Pos.	Nation	Player
17	DF	ENG	Scott Minto
18	DF	NOR	Erland Johnsen
19	DF	ENG	Paul Parker
20	DF	JAM	Frank Sinclair
21	MF	ENG	Jody Morris
22	FW	ENG	Mark Nicholls
23	GK	IRL	Nick Colgan
24	MF	ENG	Eddie Newton
25	FW	ITA	Gianfranco Zola
26	DF	ENG	Neil Clement
27	MF	ENG	Paul Hughes
28	DF	ENG	Danny Granville
29	FW	ENG	Joe Sheerin
30	GK	NOR	Frode Grodås

=== Left club during season ===
Note: Flags indicate national team as defined under FIFA eligibility rules; some limited exceptions apply. Players may hold more than one non-FIFA nationality.

No.	Pos.	Nation	Player
3	DF	IRL	Terry Phelan (to Everton)
7	FW	SCO	John Spencer (to Queen's Park Rangers)
—	MF	ENG	David Rocastle (on loan to Norwich City)

No.	Pos.	Nation	Player
19	MF	ENG	Gavin Peacock (to Queen's Park Rangers)
31	GK	CAN	Craig Forrest (on loan from Ipswich Town)

=== Reserve squad ===
Note: Flags indicate national team as defined under FIFA eligibility rules; some limited exceptions apply. Players may hold more than one non-FIFA nationality.

No.	Pos.	Nation	Player
—	DF	ENG	Jon Harley
—	DF	NZL	Chris Zoricich

No.	Pos.	Nation	Player
—	DF	ENG	Nick Crittenden
—	MF	ENG	David Rocastle

== Statistics ==
No.	Pos	Nat	Player	Total		FA Premier League		FA Cup		Football League Cup	
No.	Pos	Nat	Player	Apps	Goals	Apps	Goals	Apps	Goals	Apps	Goals
30	GK	(Norway) NOR	Frode Grodås	26	0	20+1	0	4	0	1	0
2	DF	(Romania) ROU	Dan Petrescu	41	4	34	3	5	0	2	1
5	DF	(France) FRA	Frank Leboeuf	34	7	26	6	6	1	2	0
6	DF	(Scotland) SCO	Steve Clarke	40	0	31	0	6	0	3	0
17	DF	(England) ENG	Scott Minto	32	5	24+1	4	5	0	2	1
16	MF	(Italy) ITA	Roberto Di Matteo	44	9	33+1	7	7	2	3	0
11	MF	(England) ENG	Dennis Wise	40	6	27+4	3	7	3	2	0
14	MF	(Scotland) SCO	Craig Burley	37	3	26+5	2	1+2	1	3	0
9	FW	(Italy) ITA	Gianluca Vialli	34	11	23+5	9	1+4	2	1	0
10	FW	(Wales) WAL	Mark Hughes	44	14	32+3	8	6+1	5	2	1
25	FW	(Italy) ITA	Gianfranco Zola	30	12	22+1	8	7	4	0	0
13	GK	(England) ENG	Kevin Hitchcock	16	0	10+2	0	2	0	2	0
20	DF	(England) ENG	Frank Sinclair	25	1	17+2	1	6	0	0	0
8	DF	(England) ENG	Andy Myers	18	1	15+3	1	0	0	0	0
18	DF	(Norway) NOR	Erland Johnsen	22	0	14+4	0	1+2	0	1	0
12	DF	(England) ENG	Michael Duberry	17	1	13+2	1	0	0	2	0
24	MF	(England) ENG	Eddie Newton	20	1	13+2	0	5	1	0	0
27	MF	(England) ENG	Paul Hughes	13	2	8+4	2	1	0	0	0
4	MF	(Netherlands) NED	Ruud Gullit	14	1	6+6	1	0+1	0	1	0
21	MF	(England) ENG	Jody Morris	14	1	6+6	0	0	0	2	1
1	GK	(Russia) RUS	Dmitri Kharine	5	0	5	0	0	0	0	0
22	FW	(England) ENG	Mark Nicholls	10	0	3+5	0	0	0	0+2	0
28	DF	(England) ENG	Danny Granville	5	0	3+2	0	0	0	0	0
3	DF	(Republic of Ireland) IRL	Terry Phelan	4	0	1+2	0	0	0	0+1	0
19	DF	(England) ENG	Paul Parker	4	0	1+3	0	0	0	0	0
15	DF	(England) ENG	David Lee	2	1	1	1	0	0	1	0
26	DF	(England) ENG	Neil Clement	1	0	1	0	0	0	0	0
29	GK	(Republic of Ireland) IRL	Nick Colgan	1	0	1	0	0	0	0	0
7	FW	(Scotland) SCO	John Spencer	7	2	0+4	0	0	0	3	2

Statistics taken from. Squad details and shirt numbers from and .

== Transfers ==
=== In ===
#	Pos	Player	From	Fee	Date
9	FW	(Italy) Gianluca Vialli	(Italy) Juventus	Free	24 May 1996
16	MF	(Italy) Roberto Di Matteo	(Italy) Lazio	£4,900,000	1 July 1996
5	DF	(France) Frank Leboeuf	(France) Strasbourg	£2,500,000	1 July 1996
30	GK	(Norway) Frode Grodås	(Norway) LSK	Free	1 November 1996
25	FW	(Italy) Gianfranco Zola	(Italy) Parma	£4,500,000	8 November 1996
28	DF	(England) Danny Granville	(England) Cambridge United	£300,000	20 March 1997
	DF	(Nigeria) Celestine Babayaro	(Belgium) Anderlecht	£2,250,000	21 April 1997

=== Out ===
#	Pos	Player	To	Fee	Date
	FW	(England) Zeke Rowe	(England) Peterborough United	Free	4 July 1996
	MF	(Turkey) Muzzy Izzet	(England) Leicester City	£650,000	8 July 1996
	MF	(England) Ritchie Hanlon	(England) Southend United	Free	10 July 1996
	FW	(England) Paul Furlong	(England) Birmingham City	£1,500,000	17 July 1996
	DF	(England) Anthony Barness	(England) Charlton Athletic	£165,000	1 August 1996
	MF	(Northern Ireland) Russell Kelly	(England) Darlington	Free	16 August 1996
	FW	(Scotland) John Spencer	(England) QPR	£2,500,000	21 November 1996
	MF	(England) Gavin Peacock	(England) QPR	£800,000	23 December 1996
	DF	(Republic of Ireland) Terry Phelan	(England) Everton	£850,000	30 December 1996

Transfers in: ▼£14,450,000
Transfers out: ▲£4,965,000
Total spending: ▼£9,485,000
