= 1995–96 Chelsea F.C. season =

English football club season

Chelsea
1995–96 season
- Chairman: Ken Bates
- Manager: Glenn Hoddle
- FA Premier League: 11th
- FA Cup: Semi-finals
- League Cup: Second round
- Top goalscorer: League: John Spencer (13); All: John Spencer (14)
- Highest home attendance: 31,137 (vs. Liverpool, 30 December)
- Lowest home attendance: 16,272 (vs. Stoke City, 4 October)
- Average home league attendance: 25,466
Home colours	Away colours

During the 1995–96 English football season, Chelsea competed in the Premier League.

== Season summary ==
The big news at Chelsea at the start of the 1995–96 season was the arrival of Manchester United striker Mark Hughes, one of the most accomplished strikers of the last decade in the English leagues, and the arrival of Dutch superstar Ruud Gullit.

Chelsea had a mid-table Premiership campaign in 1995–96, finishing 11th for the third time in four seasons, but once again they enjoyed a good cup run. This time they reached the FA Cup semi-finals, taking on Manchester United, who had beaten them in the final two years earlier. Chelsea took an early lead, but lost 2–1 and with it went their hopes of a foray into Europe. A few weeks later, Chelsea manager Glenn Hoddle's decision to quit for the England manager's job was understandable as it was a job he could not turn down. They responded by appointing Ruud Gullit as player-manager. Gullit wasted no time in preparing Chelsea for the following season, breaking the club record in a £4.9 million move for Italian midfielder Roberto Di Matteo from Lazio.

== Statistics ==
No.	Pos	Nat	Player	Total		Premier League		FA Cup		Football League Cup	
No.	Pos	Nat	Player	Apps	Goals	Apps	Goals	Apps	Goals	Apps	Goals
1	GK	(Russia) RUS	Dmitri Kharin	29	0	26	0	1	0	2	0
24	DF	(Romania) ROU	Dan Petrescu	31	3	22+2	2	7	1	0	0
20	DF	(England) ENG	David Lee	39	1	29+2	1	7	0	0+1	0
26	DF	(England) ENG	Michael Duberry	30	2	22	0	8	2	0	0
2	DF	(Scotland) SCO	Steve Clarke	31	0	21+1	0	6+2	0	1	0
15	DF	(England) ENG	Andy Myers	23	0	20	0	3	0	0	0
4	MF	(Netherlands) NED	Ruud Gullit	40	6	31	3	7	3	2	0
11	MF	(England) ENG	Dennis Wise	44	8	34+1	7	7	1	2	0
18	MF	(England) ENG	Eddie Newton	28	1	21+3	1	3	0	1	0
7	FW	(Scotland) SCO	John Spencer	37	14	23+5	13	8	1	1	0
8	FW	(Wales) WAL	Mark Hughes	39	12	31	8	6	4	2	0
13	GK	(England) ENG	Kevin Hitchcock	19	0	12	0	7	0	0	0
5	DF	(Norway) NOR	Erland Johnsen	26	0	18+4	0	1+1	0	2	0
10	FW	(England) ENG	Gavin Peacock	36	7	17+11	5	3+4	2	1	0
12	MF	(Scotland) SCO	Craig Burley	26	0	16+6	0	2	0	2	0
14	FW	(England) ENG	Paul Furlong	38	4	14+14	3	4+4	1	1+1	0
17	MF	(England) ENG	Nigel Spackman	20	0	13+3	0	0+3	0	1	0
6	DF	(England) ENG	Frank Sinclair	15	1	12+1	1	0	0	2	0
25	DF	(Republic of Ireland) IRL	Terry Phelan	20	0	12	0	8	0	0	0
3	DF	(England) ENG	Scott Minto	16	0	10	0	5	0	1	0
9	FW	(South Africa) RSA	Mark Stein	9	0	7+1	0	0	0	0+1	0
27	DF	(Wales) WAL	Gareth Hall	5	1	5	1	0	0	0	0
16	MF	(England) ENG	David Rocastle	1	0	1	0	0	0	0	0
28	DF	(Scotland) SCO	Andy Dow	1	0	1	0	0	0	0	0
23	MF	(England) ENG	Jody Morris	1	0	0+1	0	0	0	0	0

- Source: https://web.archive.org/web/20090520151010/http://www.soccerbase.com/squad_season.sd?teamid=536

Squad details and shirt numbers from .

== Results ==
=== Premier League ===
Date	Opponent	Venue	Result	Attendance	Scorers
19 August 1995	Everton	H	0–0	30,189	
23 August 1995	Nottingham Forest	A	0–0	27,007	
26 August 1995	Middlesbrough	A	0–2	28,286	
30 August 1995	Coventry City	H	2–2	24,398	Wise(pen.), M. Hughes
11 September 1995	West Ham United	A	3–1	19,228	Spencer (2), Wise
16 September 1995	Southampton	H	3–0	26,237	Sinclair, Gullit, M. Hughes
24 September 1995	Newcastle United	A	0–2	36,225	
30 September 1995	Arsenal	H	1–0	31,048	M. Hughes
14 October 1995	Aston Villa	A	1–0	34,922	Wise
21 October 1995	Manchester United	H	1–4	31,019	M. Hughes
28 October 1995	Blackburn Rovers	A	0–3	27,733	
4 November 1995	Sheffield Wednesday	H	0–0	23,216	
18 November 1995	Leeds United	A	0–1	36,209	
22 November 1995	Bolton Wanderers	H	3–2	17,495	David Lee, Hall, Newton
25 November 1995	Tottenham Hotspur	H	0–0	31,059	
2 December 1995	Manchester United	A	1–1	42,019	Wise
9 December 1995	Newcastle United	H	1–0	31,098	Petrescu
16 December 1995	Arsenal	A	1–1	38,295	Spencer
23 December 1995	Manchester City	A	1–0	28,668	Peacock
26 December 1995	Wimbledon	H	1–2	21,906	Petrescu
30 December 1995	Liverpool	H	2–2	31,137	Spencer (2)
2 January 1996	Queens Park Rangers	A	2–1	14,904	Brazier (O.G), Furlong
13 January 1996	Everton	A	1–1	34,968	Spencer
20 January 1996	Nottingham Forest	H	1–0	24,482	Spencer
4 February 1996	Middlesbrough	H	5–0	21,060	Peacock (3), Furlong, Spencer
10 February 1996	Coventry City	A	0–1	20,639	
17 February 1996	West Ham United	H	1–2	25,252	Peacock
24 February 1996	Southampton	A	3–2	15,226	Wise (2), Gullit
2 March 1996	Wimbledon	A	1–1	17,048	Furlong
12 March 1996	Manchester City	H	1–1	17,078	Gullit
16 March 1996	Liverpool	A	0–2	40,820	
23 March 1996	Queens Park Rangers	H	1–1	25,590	Spencer
6 April 1996	Aston Villa	H	1–2	23,530	Spencer
8 April 1996	Bolton Wanderers	A	1–2	18,021	Spencer
13 April 1996	Leeds United	H	4–1	22,131	M. Hughes (3), Spencer
17 April 1996	Sheffield Wednesday	A	0–0	25,094	
27 April 1996	Tottenham Hotspur	A	1–1	32,918	M. Hughes
5 May 1996	Blackburn Rovers	H	2–3	28,436	Wise, Spencer

Pos	Team	Pld	W	D	L	GF	GA	GD	Pts
9	Nottingham Forest	38	15	13	10	50	54	−4	58
10	West Ham United	38	14	9	15	43	52	−9	51
11	Chelsea	38	12	14	12	46	44	+2	50
12	Middlesbrough	38	11	10	17	35	50	−15	43
13	Leeds United	38	12	7	19	40	57	−17	43

Source: Premier League
Rules for classification: 1) points; 2) goal difference; 3) number of goals scored.

=== League Cup ===
Date	Round	Opponent	Venue	Result	Attendance	Scorers
20 September 1995	R2	Stoke City	A	0–0	15,574	
4 October 1995	R2	Stoke City	H	0–1	16,272	

=== FA Cup ===
Date	Round	Opponent	Venue	Result	Attendance	Scorers
7 January 1996	R3	Newcastle United	H	1–1	25,151	M. Hughes
17 January 1996	R3	Newcastle United	A	2–2	36,535	Gullit, Wise
Chelsea won 4–2 on penalties
29 January 1996	R4	Queens Park Rangers	A	2–1	18,542	Furlong, Peacock
21 February 1996	R5	Grimsby Town	A	0–0	9,648	
28 February 1996	R5	Grimsby Town	H	4–1	28,545	Duberry, M. Hughes, Peacock, Spencer
9 March 1996	R6	Wimbledon	H	2–2	30,805	Gullit, M. Hughes
20 March 1996	R6	Wimbledon	A	3–1	21,380	Duberry, M. Hughes, Petrescu
31 March 1996	SF	Manchester United	N	1–2	38,421	Gullit
