= 1993–94 Chelsea F.C. season =

English football club season

Chelsea
1993–94 season
- Chairman: Ken Bates
- Manager: Glenn Hoddle
- Stadium: Stamford Bridge
- FA Premier League: 14th
- FA Cup: Runners-up
- League Cup: Third round
- Top goalscorer: League: Stein (13); All: Stein/Peacock (14)
- Average home league attendance: 19,416
Home colours	Away colours	Third colours

During the 1993–94 English football season, Chelsea F.C. competed in the second season of the FA Premier League.

== Season summary ==
The appointment of Glenn Hoddle as Chelsea's new player-manager was awaited with much optimism for the new season, as previous managers had not been able to secure anything better than mid-table finishes in the three previous seasons. However, as the 1993–94 season lagged away, it looked as though Hoddle's appointment had done little to boost Chelsea's mediocre fortunes as they hovered around the middle of the Premier League. In the end, they finished 14th - three places lower than last season, but an appearance in the FA Cup final meant that they would be qualifying for the European Cup Winners' Cup whether they won or not, as their opponents Manchester United had already won the Premier League title and qualified for the European Cup.

As the players entered the dressing rooms for half-time at Wembley, the scoreline was 0–0, but Chelsea's dream was shattered in the second half as United scored four goals to win 4–0, but at least Chelsea would be playing in Europe next season for the first time in over 20 years. The wait for a major trophy, however, entered its 24th season.

Striker Mark Stein was added to the squad in mid-season, and quickly proved himself to be a competent Premier League goalscorer after impressing in the lower leagues. Pre-season signings Gavin Peacock was also impressive.

Hoddle bolstered his squad for 1994–95 by signing David Rocastle from Manchester City in a bid to strengthen the midfield following Andy Townsend's mid-season move to Aston Villa.

== Final league table ==
Pos	Team	Pld	W	D	L	GF	GA	GD	Pts	Qualification or relegation
12	Norwich City	42	12	17	13	65	61	+4	53	
13	West Ham United	42	13	13	16	47	58	−11	52	
14	Chelsea	42	13	12	17	49	53	−4	51	Qualification for the Cup Winners' Cup first round (Note: Chelsea qualified for the Cup Winners' Cup as FA Cup runners-up, as winners Manchester United qualified for the Champions League.)
15	Tottenham Hotspur	42	11	12	19	54	59	−5	45	
16	Manchester City	42	9	18	15	38	49	−11	45	

Source: Premier League
Rules for classification: 1) points; 2) goal difference; 3) number of goals scored.

== Results ==
Chelsea's score comes first

=== Legend ===
Win	Draw	Loss

=== FA Premier League ===
Date	Opponent	Venue	Result	Attendance	Scorers
14 August 1993	Blackburn Rovers	H	1–2	29,189	Peacock
17 August 1993	Wimbledon	A	1–1	11,083	Wise
21 August 1993	Ipswich Town	A	0–1	17,582	
25 August 1993	Queens Park Rangers	H	2–0	20,191	Peacock, Cascarino
28 August 1993	Sheffield Wednesday	H	1–1	16,652	Lee
1 September 1993	Tottenham Hotspur	A	1–1	27,567	Cascarino
11 September 1993	Manchester United	H	1–0	37,064	Peacock
18 September 1993	Coventry City	A	1–1	13,660	Peacock
25 September 1993	Liverpool	H	1–0	31,721	Shipperley
2 October 1993	West Ham United	A	0–1	18,917	
16 October 1993	Norwich City	H	1–2	16,923	Peacock
23 October 1993	Aston Villa	A	0–1	29,706	
30 October 1993	Oldham Athletic	H	0–1	15,372	
6 November 1993	Leeds United	A	1–4	35,022	Shipperley
20 November 1993	Arsenal	H	0–2	26,839	
22 November 1993	Manchester City	H	0–0	10,128	
27 November 1993	Sheffield United	A	0–1	16,119	
5 December 1993	Blackburn Rovers	A	0–2	15,736	
11 December 1993	Ipswich Town	H	1–1	12,508	Peacock
27 December 1993	Southampton	A	1–3	14,221	Stein
28 December 1993	Newcastle United	H	1–0	22,133	Stein
1 January 1994	Swindon Town	A	3–1	16,456	Shipperley, Wise, Stein
3 January 1994	Everton	H	4–2	18,338	Shipperley, Burley, Stein (2, 1 pen)
15 January 1994	Norwich City	A	1–1	19,472	Stein
22 January 1994	Aston Villa	H	1–1	18,341	Stein
5 February 1994	Everton	A	2–4	18,821	Stein (2)
12 February 1994	Oldham Athletic	A	1–2	12,022	Spencer
27 February 1994	Tottenham Hotspur	H	4–3	16,807	Spencer, Stein (2, 1 pen), Donaghy
5 March 1994	Manchester United	A	1–0	44,745	Peacock
16 March 1994	Wimbledon	H	2–0	11,903	Burley, Fashanu (own goal)
19 March 1994	Liverpool	A	1–2	38,629	Burley
26 March 1994	West Ham United	H	2–0	20,003	Barnard, Hoddle
30 March 1994	Sheffield Wednesday	A	1–3	20,433	Spencer
2 April 1994	Southampton	H	2–0	19,801	Johnsen, Spencer
4 April 1994	Newcastle United	A	0–0	32,216	
13 April 1994	Queens Park Rangers	A	1–1	15,735	Wise
16 April 1994	Arsenal	A	0–1	34,314	
23 April 1994	Leeds United	H	1–1	18,544	Spencer
27 April 1994	Swindon Town	H	2–0	11,180	Peacock, Wise (pen)
30 April 1994	Manchester City	A	2–2	33,594	Fleck, Cascarino
4 May 1994	Coventry City	H	1–2	8,923	Cascarino
7 May 1994	Sheffield United	H	3–2	21,782	Stein (2), Kjeldbjerg

=== FA Cup ===
Round	Date	Opponent	Venue	Result	Attendance	Goalscorers
R3	8 January 1994	Barnet	A	0–0^{4}	23,200	
R3R	19 January 1994	Barnet	H	4–0	16,209	Burley, Peacock, Shipperley, Stein
R4	29 January 1994	Sheffield Wednesday	H	1–1	26,094	Peacock
R4R	9 February 1994	Sheffield Wednesday	A	3–1	26,144	Spencer, Burley, Peacock
R5	19 February 1994	Oxford United	A	2–1	10,787	Spencer, Burley
QF	13 March 1994	Wolverhampton Wanderers	H	1–0	29,340	Peacock
SF	9 April 1994	Luton Town	N	2–0	59,989	Peacock (2)
F	14 May 1994	Manchester United	N	0–4	79,634	

^{4} Barnet's home tie against Chelsea was switched to Stamford Bridge under police advice and instruction from Barnet.

=== League Cup ===
Round	Date	Opponent	Venue	Result	Attendance	Goalscorers
R2 1st leg	22 September 1993	West Bromwich Albion	A	1–1	14,919	Shipperley
R2 2nd leg	6 October 1993	West Bromwich Albion	H	2–1 (won 3–2 on agg)	11,959	Wise (2)
R3	26 October 1993	Manchester City	A	0–1	16,713	

== First-team squad ==
Squad at end of season

Note: Flags indicate national team as defined under FIFA eligibility rules; some limited exceptions apply. Players may hold more than one non-FIFA nationality.

No.	Pos.	Nation	Player
1	GK	RUS	Dmitri Kharine
2	DF	WAL	Darren Barnard
3	DF	ENG	Andy Myers
4	DF	ENG	David Lee
5	DF	NOR	Erland Johnsen
6	DF	ENG	Frank Sinclair
7	FW	SCO	John Spencer
8	MF	ENG	Damian Matthew
9	FW	IRL	Tony Cascarino
10	MF	ENG	Gavin Peacock
11	MF	ENG	Dennis Wise (captain)
12	DF	SCO	Steve Clarke
13	GK	ENG	Kevin Hitchcock
14	DF	WAL	Gareth Hall
15	DF	NIR	Mal Donaghy
16	FW	SCO	Robert Fleck
17	MF	ENG	Nigel Spackman

No.	Pos.	Nation	Player
18	MF	ENG	Eddie Newton
19	FW	ENG	Neil Shipperley
20	MF	ENG	Glenn Hoddle (player–manager)
21	FW	RSA	Mark Stein
22	DF	ENG	Paul Elliott
24	MF	SCO	Craig Burley
26	DF	SCO	Andy Dow
27	MF	SCO	David Hopkin
28	DF	ENG	Michael Duberry
29	DF	ENG	Anthony Barness
30	GK	IRL	Nick Colgan
31	FW	ENG	Zeke Rowe
32	MF	ENG	Muzzy Izzet
33	DF	ENG	Terry Skiverton
34	DF	ENG	Craig Norman
35	DF	DEN	Jakob Kjeldbjerg

=== Left club during season ===
Note: Flags indicate national team as defined under FIFA eligibility rules; some limited exceptions apply. Players may hold more than one non-FIFA nationality.

No.	Pos.	Nation	Player
23	GK	ENG	Dave Beasant (to Southampton)
25	DF	ENG	Ian Pearce (to Blackburn Rovers)

No.	Pos.	Nation	Player
28	DF	ENG	Steve Livingstone (to Grimsby Town)
