= 1994 FA Cup final =

English association football match

- The match programme cover
- Event: 1993–94 FA Cup
Chelsea	Manchester United
0	4
- Date: 14 May 1994
- Venue: Wembley Stadium, London
- Referee: David Elleray (London)
- Attendance: 79,634
- Weather: Rain

The 1994 FA Cup final was an association football match that took place on 14 May 1994 at Wembley Stadium in London to determine the winner of the 1993–94 FA Cup. It was contested between Chelsea and Manchester United. Four goals in the second half from Eric Cantona (who scored twice), Mark Hughes and Brian McClair gave Manchester United their eighth FA Cup title.

It was the 49th FA Cup final to be held since the Second World War. Manchester United went into the final as Premier League champions, having won the title by eight points over Blackburn Rovers. They were bidding to become only the fourth team of the 20th century to complete "the Double" and the first in their own history. Chelsea, on the other hand, were playing in their first FA Cup final since 1970 and first major final since the 1972 Football League Cup final; they also finished 14th in the Premier League.

== Route to the final ==
Results of all 1993–94 FA Cup matches:

=== Chelsea ===
Round	Opposition	Score
3rd	Barnet (A)	0–0
3rd (r)	Barnet (H)	4–0
4th	Sheffield Wednesday (H)	1–1
4th (r)	Sheffield Wednesday (A)	3–1
5th	Oxford United (A)	2–1
QF	Wolverhampton Wanderers (H)	1–0
SF	Luton Town (N)	2–0
Key: (H) = Home venue; (A) = Away venue; (N) = Neutral venue; r = Replay.

Chelsea entered the competition in the third round as a Premier League side. Chelsea's cup run started with an away tie against Barnet which was played at Stamford Bridge instead of Underhill. The Second Division side held Chelsea to a 0–0 draw. The replay saw Chelsea prevail 4–0 thanks to goals by Craig Burley, Gavin Peacock, Neil Shipperley and Mark Stein. In the fourth round, Chelsea were drawn at home to Premier League side Sheffield Wednesday. A 1–1 draw at home thanks to a goal by Gavin Peacock set up a replay at Hillsborough. The replay was won 3–1 thanks to goals by John Spencer, Craig Burley and Gavin Peacock. In the fifth round, the Blues were drawn away to Oxford United of the First Division. Chelsea won 2–1 at Manor Ground with goals from John Spencer and Craig Burley, sending Chelsea into the quarter-finals of the competition. Oxford's Mike Ford also missed a late penalty as Chelsea hung on to progress to the next round. In the quarter-finals, Chelsea narrowly won 1–0 against First Division Wolverhampton Wanderers. The semi-final which was held at the Old Wembley was played against First Division Luton Town. Two goals by Gavin Peacock sealed Chelsea's place in the 1994 FA Cup Final. This would be Chelsea's first appearance in an FA Cup Final in 24 years.

=== Manchester United ===
Round	Opposition	Score
3rd	Sheffield United (A)	1–0
4th	Norwich City (A)	2–0
5th	Wimbledon (A)	3–0
QF	Charlton Athletic (H)	3–1
SF	Oldham Athletic (N)	1–1
SF (r)	Oldham Athletic (N)	4–1
Key: (H) = Home venue; (A) = Away venue; (N) = Neutral venue.

Also as a Premier League side, Manchester United entered the FA Cup in the third round of the competition. United started their run at Bramall Lane against Premier League Sheffield United. A second half goal by Mark Hughes sealed a 1–0 win. In the fourth round, United won 2–0 at Carrow Road with goals from Roy Keane and Eric Cantona either side of half time. In the fifth round, Manchester United were drawn at Premier League side Wimbledon. Three goals from Cantona, Paul Ince and Denis Irwin confirmed the Red Devils' place in the quarter-finals. Manchester United won 3–1 against First Division Charlton Athletic with a goal from Mark Hughes and a brace by Andrei Kanchelskis. In the semi-final at Wembley, United met relegation-threatened Oldham Athletic (a repeat of the 1990 FA Cup semi-final). After a goalless draw, the Latics took the lead in extra time thanks to Neil Pointon. A 119th minute goal by Mark Hughes forced a replay at Maine Road. In the replay, United won 4–1 thanks to goals by Irwin, Kanchelskis, Robson and Giggs. This set up a first FA Cup Final for Manchester United since the 1990 match against Crystal Palace.

== Match ==
=== Summary ===
==== First half ====
The match took place on a rainy May afternoon, and, in the first half, Chelsea were considered the better team. Gavin Peacock had the best chance of the opening 45 minutes when his half-volley hit the crossbar in the 25th minute.

==== Second half ====
In the second half, Manchester United took control of the match with three goals in the space of nine minutes, with the first two goals coming from the penalty spot. The first penalty came after a poor challenge by Eddie Newton on Denis Irwin with Eric Cantona scoring the subsequent penalty in the bottom right corner, sending Dmitri Kharine the wrong way. The second penalty was considered more controversial after Sinclair had barged Andrei Kanchelskis. Cantona stepped up to take the penalty, opting for the same corner as the first penalty and again sending the goalkeeper the wrong way. Mark Hughes wrapped up the match for the Red Devils with a low finish to the bottom left corner after a slip by Sinclair. A fourth goal was scored in the second minute of stoppage time when Mark Hughes played a through ball to Paul Ince to leave him one on one with the goalkeeper. After going around Kharine in the Chelsea goal, Ince squared the ball for Brian McClair to tap the ball into an empty net.

=== Details ===
14 May 1994
15:00 BST

Chelsea	0–4	Manchester United
	Report	Cantona 61' (pen.), 67' (pen.); Hughes 69'; McClair 90+3'

Wembley Stadium, London
Attendance: 79,634
Referee: David Elleray (Middlesex)

Chelsea	Manchester United

GK	1	(Russia) Dmitri Kharine
RB	12	(Scotland) Steve Clarke
CB	5	(Norway) Erland Johnsen	(yellow card) 2'
CB	35	(Denmark) Jakob Kjeldbjerg
LB	6	(England) Frank Sinclair
DM	18	(England) Eddie Newton
RM	24	(Scotland) Craig Burley		(substituted off) 68'
LM	11	(England) Dennis Wise (c)
AM	10	(England) Gavin Peacock
CF	7	(Scotland) John Spencer
CF	21	(England) Mark Stein	(yellow card) 66'	(substituted off) 79'
Substitutes:
GK	13	(England) Kevin Hitchcock
MF	20	(England) Glenn Hoddle		(substituted in) 68'
FW	9	(Republic of Ireland) Tony Cascarino		(substituted in) 79'
Player-Manager:
(England) Glenn Hoddle

GK	1	(Denmark) Peter Schmeichel
RB	2	(England) Paul Parker
CB	4	(England) Steve Bruce (c)	(yellow card) 19'
CB	6	(England) Gary Pallister
LB	3	(Republic of Ireland) Denis Irwin		(substituted off) 86'
RM	14	(Russia) Andrei Kanchelskis		(substituted off) 86'
CM	8	(England) Paul Ince
CM	16	(Republic of Ireland) Roy Keane
LM	11	(Wales) Ryan Giggs
CF	10	(Wales) Mark Hughes
CF	7	(France) Eric Cantona
Substitutes:
GK	25	(England) Gary Walsh
MF	5	(England) Lee Sharpe		(substituted in) 86'
MF	9	(Scotland) Brian McClair		(substituted in) 86'
Manager:
(Scotland) Alex Ferguson

- Linesmen:
  - Graham Barber (Surrey)
  - Paul Rejer (Staffordshire)
- Reserve official: Gerald Ashby (Worcestershire)

Match rules

- 90 minutes
- 30 minutes of extra-time if necessary
- Replay on 19 May 1994 if scores still level
- Three named substitutes, of which two may be used

== Post-match ==
By winning the final, Manchester United became only the fourth team in the 20th century to win both a League title and FA Cup in the same season. The victory sealed a joint record eighth FA Cup victory for Manchester United, pulling level with Tottenham Hotspur in the all-time rankings.

Referee David Elleray has since stated that he regrets giving the second penalty to Manchester United, stating "It was my big game and I made a disappointing decision." Elleray explained post-match that he had a better view of Sinclair's challenge than the linesman.

Chelsea, despite losing their first FA Cup Final since they won the trophy 24 years earlier, qualified for the 1994–95 UEFA Cup Winners' Cup as United had also won the Premier League title and would be competing in the UEFA Champions League. As a result of the League and cup victory for the Red Devils, Manchester United qualified for the 1994 FA Charity Shield. United faced the runners-up of the 1993–94 Premier League season Blackburn Rovers. Goals by Eric Cantona and Paul Ince saw United win the match 2–0.

== See also ==
- 1993–94 in English football
- FA Cup
- List of FA Cup Finals
- Come On You Reds (Manchester United song)
- No One Can Stop Us Now (Chelsea song)
