= Frank Sinclair =

Jamaican footballer (born 1971)

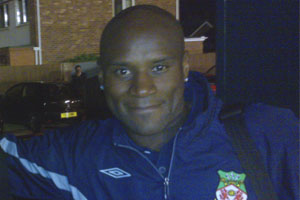
- Sinclair with Wrexham in 2009

Personal information
- Full name: Frank Mohammed Sinclair
- Date of birth: 3 December 1971 (age 54)
- Place of birth: Lambeth, London, England
- Height: 5 ft 10 in (1.78 m)
- Position: Defender

Youth career
- 1982–1990: Chelsea

Senior career*
Years	Team	Apps	(Gls)
1990–1998	Chelsea	169	(7)
1991–1992	→ West Bromwich Albion (loan)	6	(1)
1998–2004	Leicester City	164	(3)
2004–2007	Burnley	92	(1)
2007	→ Huddersfield Town (loan)	13	(0)
2007–2008	Huddersfield Town	29	(0)
2008–2009	Lincoln City	23	(0)
2009	→ Wycombe Wanderers (loan)	9	(0)
2009–2011	Wrexham	57	(0)
2011	Hendon	10	(0)
2012–2015	Colwyn Bay	66	(8)
2015	Brackley Town	13	(0)
Total		651	(20)

International career
1998–2003	Jamaica	28	(0)

Managerial career
- 2013–2015: Colwyn Bay
- 2015: Brackley Town (caretaker)
- 2015–2016: Hednesford Town
- * Club domestic league appearances and goals

Frank Mohammed Sinclair (born 3 December 1971) is a former professional football player and manager who is a coach in the Academy at Burnley.

He made 756 league and cup appearances in a 25-year playing career, scoring 27 goals. A defender, he began his career at Chelsea, turning professional in May 1990 and then making his debut in the Football League in April 1991. He played on loan at West Bromwich Albion between December 1991 and March 1992. He established himself in the first team at Chelsea during the 1992–93 Premier League campaign and went on to be named as the club's Player of the Year for 1993. He played on the losing side in the 1994 FA Cup final, before picking up a winners' medal after Chelsea beat Middlesbrough 2–0 in the 1997 final. Chelsea also won the League Cup by beating Middlesbrough 2–0 in the final the following year, and Sinclair scored the opening goal in extra time. Chelsea also won the UEFA Cup Winners' Cup in 1998, though Sinclair was ruled out of the final due to injury.

He was sold to Leicester City in August 1998 for a fee of £2 million. He won his second League Cup final in 2000, as Leicester defeated Tranmere Rovers 2–1. He spent a total of six seasons at Leicester, five of which were spent in the Premier League, the exception being the 2002–03 First Division promotion campaign. He joined Championship club Burnley on a free transfer in June 2004. He served as a club captain from January 2005 to the summer of 2006. He joined League One side Huddersfield Town on an emergency loan in February 2007, which became a permanent transfer in the summer. He dropped into League Two to join Lincoln City in July 2008, who loaned him out to Wycombe Wanderers in March 2009; he helped Wycombe to win promotion out of League Two at the end of the 2008–09 season. He then spent the next two seasons in the Conference with Wrexham before playing for Hendon in November 2011 and Colwyn Bay in January 2012.

Born in England, he represented the Jamaica national team at the 1998 CONCACAF Gold Cup. He played five games as the team finished in fourth place after losing to Brazil in the third-place play-off match. He also played all three of his country's games at the 1998 FIFA World Cup. He featured twice in the 2000 CONCACAF Gold Cup and ended his international career in October 2003 after 28 caps.

Sinclair was appointed as player-manager at Colwyn Bay in February 2013 and was named Conference North Manager of the Month in April and December 2013. He went on to serve Brackley Town as caretaker manager in October 2015 and served as Hednesford Town manager from December 2015 to April 2016. He later spent time as a coach at Stoke City, Radcliffe, Port Vale and Doncaster Rovers. He is the father of fellow professional footballer Tyrese Sinclair.

== Club career ==
=== Chelsea ===
Sinclair was born in the London Borough of Lambeth and grew up in Clapham. He attended Pimlico School in Westminster and was offered trials at Chelsea, Arsenal and Wimbledon whilst he represented the West London district team. He later joined Chelsea as an eleven-year-old, stating that supporting the club was a major influence in his decision making. He progressed through the youth age groups, going on to sign as an apprentice in April 1988, before turning professional in May 1990. In April 1991, after a run of four consecutive defeats, Chelsea manager Bobby Campbell decided to blood some youngsters at Luton Town. Sinclair was chosen out of position at left-back, but impressed on his debut as Chelsea fought back from 3–0 down to draw the match 3–3 despite having ten men for the whole of the second half. He kept his place in the side for the next three fixtures at left-back but was subbed off at half-time in a 7–0 away defeat to Nottingham Forest and then rested for the remainder of the 1990–91 season.

He made his first appearance of the 1991–92 campaign in Chelsea's first away game, a disappointing 3–0 defeat to Oldham Athletic at Boundary Park. After this performance he was dropped from the side and failed to make a matchday squad under manager Ian Porterfield. In December 1991, he was sent on a short loan spell at Third Division side West Bromwich Albion to gain some more experience. He impressed on his Albion debut, which came in a 1–1 draw away at Bradford City on 14 December. In only his second appearance for the club, he was sent off for violent conduct in the draw with Exeter City when he was involved in a clash of heads with referee Paul Alcock. Despite video evidence showing that the "butting" was accidental he was still found guilty by The Football Association and received a nine-match ban and a £600 fine. He remained at The Hawthorns and went on to make a total of six appearances for the "Baggies", scoring once before returning to Chelsea in March 1992. He made his comeback for Chelsea in a 1–0 victory over Norwich City in March and made a further six appearances that season, scoring his first Chelsea goal with a header in the 3–1 defeat to Aston Villa in April.

An ankle injury kept Sinclair out of the side at the beginning of the 1992–93 season. He returned to the first team in September in a televised match against Manchester City that Chelsea won 1–0. However, Sinclair's mentor, Paul Elliott, suffered a career-ending injury in the match. Despite this setback, Sinclair made thirty-nine appearances in all competitions, primarily at left-back, as Chelsea finished in mid-table. His impressive performances earned him the Chelsea Player of the Year award in 1993. Glenn Hoddle was appointed as manager for the 1993–94 season, replacing David Webb, and preferred using a sweeper system, which saw Sinclair convert into a central defender. He excelled in this position. However, the team's performances were poor, and the side was involved in a relegation battle for most of the campaign. Despite their poor league form Chelsea made it to the 1994 FA Cup final against Manchester United at Wembley Stadium, their first major cup final since 1972. Chelsea could not prevent United from claiming the league and cup double in a 4–0 defeat, with Sinclair conceding the penalty for a foul on Andrei Kanchelskis in the second-half, which was scored by Eric Cantona to make it 2–0. Despite the defeat Chelsea qualified for the next seasons UEFA Cup Winners' Cup as runners-up, their first European campaign in over twenty years.

Sinclair scored on the opening day of the 1994–95 season with a composed finish in a 2–0 win over Norwich City at Stamford Bridge. He scored four minutes into his debut in European football with a header in a 4–2 win over Czech side Viktoria Žižkov in the Cup Winners' Cup. He played in all but one of the European matches as Chelsea reached the semi-finals, where they were knocked out by Real Zaragoza 4–3 on aggregate. Chelsea again had a disappointing league campaign, finishing in 11th position. Still, Sinclair went on to have his best return for the "Blues" with 47 appearances in all competitions, also chipping in with further goals against Queens Park Rangers and Wimbledon. However, he featured just 15 times in the 1995–96 campaign.

He also found first-team appearances limited under player-manager Ruud Gullit during the 1996–97 season. However, he made six appearances in the FA Cup and was one of three centre-backs – the others being Frank Leboeuf and Steve Clarke – to start in the 1997 final as they beat Middlesbrough 2–0 to lift the trophy. The following season, Sinclair played in the 1997 FA Charity Shield as Chelsea lost on penalties to Manchester United after he missed the opening penalty. On 9 August, he hit the headlines after celebrating a goal against Coventry City by dropping his pants; he later explained he did this in tribute to his newborn daughter. He went on to score for Chelsea in the League Cup final, again over Middlesbrough, in a 2–0 win. His first-team chances were starting to become limited though, as new manager Gianluca Vialli built a new team, which consisted mostly of continental stars including centre-backs Frank Leboeuf and Marcel Desailly, whilst John Terry was coming through the youth team. He missed the UEFA Cup Winners' Cup final victory over VfB Stuttgart due to a calf injury, though did make five appearances in the competition. Due to the injuries and competition for places, the League Cup final against Middlesbrough proved to be his final appearance for the club.

=== Leicester City ===
Sinclair was sold to Leicester City in August 1998 for a fee of £2 million. During his time at Filbert Street Sinclair developed an unfortunate reputation for scoring own goals. This was caused initially by two own goals in consecutive weekends in 1999. The first was a great leap at Highbury to give Arsenal a 2–1 win. He managed to refrain from putting through his own net against Coventry City the following Wednesday, but then scored another at home to former club Chelsea, where he beat Tore André Flo to the ball to smash it into his own net and lose Leicester their one-goal lead. The importance of these goals was accentuated by the fact that both came in the last minute of the match. Both caused Leicester to drop points, although it wasn't enough to prevent him from remaining a first-team regular.

He scored two goals in 39 appearances throughout the 1998–99 season, helping Martin O'Neill's "Foxes" to a 10th-place finish. Six of his appearances came in the League Cup, though he was not in the matchday squad for the final, a 1–0 defeat to Tottenham Hotspur. He appeared 44 times in the 1999–2000 campaign, and this time, was part of the team that played in the League Cup final, and collected his second winner's medal in the competition as Leicester triumphed 2–1 over Tranmere Rovers thanks to a brace from centre-back partner Matt Elliott.

However, he was limited to 19 appearances by manager Peter Taylor during the 2000–01 season. He was then fined two weeks' wages by Leicester in September 2001 for his part in an incident at a Heathrow hotel. Sinclair, along with four Chelsea players, had gone on a five-hour drinking binge and had stripped off, swore and vomited in front of American tourists just hours after the September 11 attacks, which killed nearly 3,000 people in America. He did though go on to re-establish himself in the starting eleven under new manager Dave Bassett. On 2 March 2002, Sinclair scored the most bizarre of his own goals. After three minutes into a game at Middlesbrough, he coolly slotted the ball past keeper Ian Walker in a seemingly laid-back situation in what proved to be the game's only goal. He held the Premier League records for most own goals until his record was overtaken by Richard Dunne.

Leicester finished the 2001–02 season in last place and were relegated out of the Premier League. The Leicester City Supporters Club voted him as their Player of the Year. Leicester made an immediate return to the top-flight in 2002–03, crowning their maiden season at the Walkers Stadium with a second-place finish in the First Division, Sinclair featuring in 37 games. In March 2004, Sinclair and his Leicester City teammates, Paul Dickov and Keith Gillespie, were arrested in Spain over sexual assault charges while on a training holiday. The charges were later dropped after DNA evidence proved that none of the men had any sexual contact with the three women who had falsely accused them. Sinclair feared his reputation had been permanently damaged by the false allegations. Leicester released Sinclair following the club's relegation at the end of the 2003–04 season.

=== Burnley ===
In June 2004, Sinclair joined Championship side Burnley on a free transfer, signing a one-year contract. He made his debut for the club on 7 August in the opening match of the 2004–05 season against Sheffield United. He struck up an impressive partnership at the centre of the defence with fellow new recruit John McGreal at the start of the season, starting in most games. On 24 December, Sinclair signed a new two-year contract extension until June 2007, with "Clarets" manager Steve Cotterill stating that "he has been an integral part of our defence". In January 2005, he was appointed as captain following the departure of Robbie Blake to Birmingham City. On 5 February, he was sent off in the local derby defeat to Leeds United after receiving two bookings. His first goal for the club came from a header on 12 March, in a 2–1 win over Rotherham United at Turf Moor. Towards the end of the season he received plaudits for his impressive partnership with young loan signing Gary Cahill and made a total of 42 appearances in his first season with the club as the side finished in mid-table.

He remained a regular during the 2005–06 season, but more often than not, he was asked to play out at right-back rather than his preferred central position, even playing when not fully fit due to the side's injury problems. On 1 November, he was on the receiving end of alleged racism in a 2–1 win over Millwall, with opposing player Ben May being sent off in the tunnel at half-time for words said to Sinclair. However, both players later denied that the incident happened. He made a total of 40 appearances in all competitions as Burnley finished in 17th-place.

At the start of the 2006–07 season, with Sinclair's first-team place no longer assured, Steve Cotterill handed over the captaincy to new signing Wayne Thomas. He played invariably at the start of the season and usually played in the right-back position. On 18 November, he was sent off in the 3–0 away defeat to West Bromwich Albion for two bookings in his hundredth appearance for the club. Whilst suspended and injured he lost his place in the side and struggled to regain it. His final game for Burnley came on 23 January in a 1–0 home defeat to Stoke City. He made a total of 102 appearances for Burnley, scoring only once.

=== Huddersfield Town ===
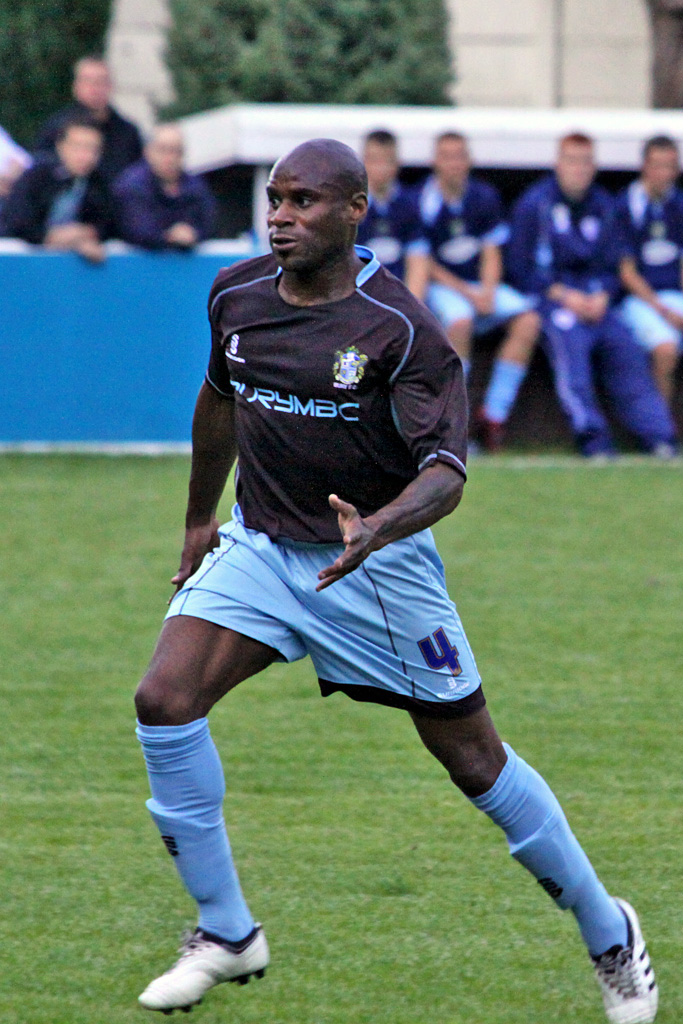
Sinclair on trial with Bury.

On 8 February 2007, Sinclair moved on an emergency loan deal to Huddersfield Town. On 24 March, he was sent off against Brighton & Hove Albion in a match which finished 0–0. Upon his return to Burnley, he was released on a free transfer and went on to sign a one-year contract at Huddersfield Town on 14 May. He cited manager Andy Ritchie as a reason for staying on: "he's been successful in League One before", he told the club's media team. On 6 October, he received his second red card of his short career at the Galpharm Stadium, in Town's 4–0 drubbing at Walsall. He received his third sending off during Town's 4–1 defeat at Southend United on 5 December. Huddersfield released Sinclair at the end of his contract in May 2008.

=== Lincoln City ===
Sinclair signed a one-year contract with League Two side Lincoln City on 1 July 2008, reuniting with manager Peter Jackson who originally brought him to Huddersfield Town. Jackson hailed Sinclair's "determination, his personality and his will to win", and said that both Wycombe Wanderers and Brighton & Hove Albion were interested in signing the player. On 26 March 2009, Sinclair made the surprise move to Wycombe Wanderers on loan from Lincoln City; former Leicester manager Peter Taylor was in charge at Adams Park. His presence helped the "Chairboys" to achieve promotion from League Two. He left Sincil Bank after being released in May 2009.

=== Non-league ===
Both Wycombe and Bury had expressed interest in signing Sinclair for the 2009–10 season, but he eventually signed a one-year deal with Conference Premier club Wrexham. On 9 March 2010, he was sent off after breaking the leg of Tom Kearney in a 1–1 draw with Altrincham, though said the challenge didn't warrant a red card. He was sent off again 21 days later, and also scored an own goal and gave away a penalty in a 2–2 draw at AFC Wimbledon. He played a major role for the "Red Dragons" in the 2010–11 season, he played in the play-off semi-final against Luton Town, where Wrexham lost 3–0 in the first leg and 2–1 in the second (5–1 on aggregate). He left the Racecourse Ground in July 2011 after failing to agree a new contract on reduced terms with manager Dean Saunders.

Sinclair signed for Hendon of the Isthmian League Premier Division on 11 November 2011, as a favour to Junior Lewis. On 6 January 2012, he joined up with Conference North side Colwyn Bay. He made his debut the next day and scored an injury-time winning goal as the "Seagulls" beat Altrincham 4–3. He was appointed player-manager at Llanelian Road on 11 February 2013.

== International career ==
Sinclair was eligible to represent England through birth and also qualified for Jamaica through his parents, who were born in the country. Following on from his impressive form for Chelsea in the 1994–95 season, he was called up by Terry Venables to the England squad for the Umbro Cup final match against Brazil in June 1995. However, he failed to make an appearance and this proved to be his only call-up to the side.

Despite wanting to represent England at international level, an opportunity to represent Jamaica arose early in November 1997 following their qualification to the 1998 FIFA World Cup. Manager René Simões had called up several English-born players such as Deon Burton, Robbie Earle, Paul Hall, and Fitzroy Simpson in the qualification matches and wanted Sinclair to join the group. Sinclair stated, "I was playing the best football of my career and was still not involved with England. Jamaica came up and I thought an opportunity like that might never happen again so I took it." He was called up to the squad for the 1998 CONCACAF Gold Cup held in February, making his debut in the opening group stage match against Brazil, which finished in a 0–0 draw at the Miami Orange Bowl. He played in the remaining two group stage games as Jamaica qualified for the knockout stage with wins over Guatemala and El Salvador. Jamaica were knocked out in the semi-finals due to a 1–0 golden goal defeat to Mexico, and finished in fourth place overall as they lost to Brazil in the third-place play-off match. Sinclair made five appearances in the tournament.

Sinclair was included in the Jamaica squad at the 1998 FIFA World Cup held in France, making history as they became the first English-speaking Caribbean country to qualify for a World Cup. He started in all three group matches against Croatia, Argentina and Japan. Jamaica lost the opening two games but claimed their first-ever point at a World Cup with the 2–1 victory over Japan in Lyon, but were still eliminated, finishing third in the group. Over the next couple of years, Sinclair represented the side in many friendly matches and was included in the squad for the 2000 CONCACAF Gold Cup. He played in the two group stage matches, a 1–0 defeat to Colombia and a 2–0 defeat to Honduras as Jamaica were knocked out at the first stage.

In July 2000, the newly appointed Jamaica technical director of football, Clóvis de Oliveira, decided to axe the five based British-based players, including Sinclair, from the upcoming 2002 FIFA World Cup qualifiers for "disciplinary reasons". However, Sinclair was later re-instated into the side and appeared in four qualifying matches in June and September 2001, but Jamaica failed to qualify for the World Cup after only winning two of their ten matches. It was two years before he made another appearance for the side and in August 2003 Sinclair stated that his appearance in the summer friendly against Nigeria would be "more than likely" his last appearance for Jamaica. He wanted to give the younger players a chance of breaking into the team and wished to focus on his club career with Leicester City, stating that the transatlantic travel could affect his form. In September 2003, he reversed his decision and was included in the squad for the friendly against Australia played at the Madejski Stadium in Reading, Berkshire. The friendly against Brazil in Leicester in October 2003 proved to be his final appearance for Jamaica, with Sinclair earning a total of twenty-eight caps.

== Managerial career ==
=== Colwyn Bay ===
After being appointed player-manager, Sinclair helped save Colwyn Bay from relegation and was named as Conference North Manager of the Month for April 2013 after overseeing six successive victories. He credited his success to new signings Shelton Payne and Jamie Ellison, as well as veteran midfielder Fraser McLachlan. He signed a new one-year contract in the summer. In July he convinced veteran striker Ade Akinbiyi to join the club. Sinclair was again named as Manager of the Month after winning all five matches in December 2013. He was named as the bookies favourite for the vacant Wrexham management post in February 2014. Sinclair led Colwyn Bay to a 12th-place finish in the 2013–14 season, the highest finish in the club's history. On 5 January 2015, he resigned as manager of Colwyn Bay, a day after a 5–0 defeat to Boston United which left the club 11 points outside the play-off places. He went on to work as a youth team coach at Oldham Athletic.

=== Brackley Town ===
He featured intermittently for struggling Conference North side Brackley Town in the 2014–15 season. After the resignation of Jon Brady, Sinclair was appointed as the club's caretaker manager on 8 September 2015, until Kevin Wilkin was appointed 12 days and three draws later.

=== Hednesford Town ===
On 15 December 2015, Sinclair was appointed manager of Conference North club Hednesford Town. On 2 March 2016, he resigned with the "Pitmen" bottom of the division having won only two of his 13 league matches in charge. However, he was reinstated just two days later after chairman Steve Price persuaded him to reconsider his resignation. Town lost just two of their first six games of his second spell in charge, but Sinclair left the club permanently on 15 April, just days after stating his intention to stay on at Keys Park for the following season.

=== Coaching spells ===
Sinclair began working as Stoke City's under-23 assistant manager in December 2016. He joined Radcliffe as assistant to manager Jon Macken in September 2017. He began coaching at Port Vale in March 2020, following an invite from assistant manager Dave Kevan. He was appointed as the club's head of coaching development five months later, saying that "I see a key part of my role as bridging the gap between the younger players and the first team". Interim manager Danny Pugh had to start self-isolation after testing positive for COVID-19 on 18 January 2021, leaving Sinclair, Billy Paynter and Anthony Griffith to take over first-team duties in his absence. The team lost both games in Pugh's absence, much to Sinclair's frustration. Sinclair left Vale Park at the end of the 2020–21 season. He joined Doncaster Rovers as an academy coach in October 2021. He became a professional development phase coach at Doncaster in January 2023. He left the club in July 2024. He joined the Academy at Burnley as a Youth Development Phase Coach in June 2025.

== Personal life ==
Sinclair has a son, Tyrese (born 2001). Tyrese previously played in the youth team of Blackburn Rovers but was released in 2017. Tyrese turned professional with Mansfield Town in July 2019.

In September 2005, Sinclair, then living in Lostock, Bolton was found guilty of drink driving at Bolton Magistrates' Court. He was banned from driving for three years and given a £2,000 fine.

== Career statistics ==
=== Club ===
Appearances and goals by club, season and competition
Club	Season	League			FA Cup		League Cup		Other		Total	
Club	Season	Division	Apps	Goals	Apps	Goals	Apps	Goals	Apps	Goals	Apps	Goals
Chelsea	1990–91	First Division	4	0	0	0	0	0	0	0	4	0
Chelsea	1991–92	First Division	8	1	1	0	0	0	0	0	9	1
Chelsea	1992–93	Premier League	32	0	1	0	6	1	—		39	1
Chelsea	1993–94	Premier League	35	0	7	0	3	0	—		45	0
Chelsea	1994–95	Premier League	35	3	3	1	2	0	7 (Note: Appearances in UEFA Cup Winners' Cup)	2	47	6
Chelsea	1995–96	Premier League	13	1	0	0	2	0	—		15	1
Chelsea	1996–97	Premier League	20	1	6	0	0	0	—		26	1
Chelsea	1997–98	Premier League	22	1	0	0	5	1	6 (Note: Five appearances and one goal in UEFA Cup Winners' Cup, one in FA Charity Shield)	1	33	3
Chelsea	Total		169	7	18	1	18	2	13	3	218	13
West Bromwich Albion (loan)	1991–92	Third Division	6	1	—		—		—		6	1
Leicester City	1998–99	Premier League	31	1	2	1	6	0	—		39	2
Leicester City	1999–2000	Premier League	34	0	3	0	7	0	—		44	0
Leicester City	2000–01	Premier League	17	0	1	0	1	0	0	0	19	0
Leicester City	2001–02	Premier League	35	0	1	0	2	0	—		38	0
Leicester City	2002–03	First Division	33	1	2	0	2	0	—		37	1
Leicester City	2003–04	Premier League	14	1	1	0	2	0	—		17	1
Leicester City	Total		164	3	10	1	20	0	0	0	194	4
Burnley	2004–05	Championship	36	1	4	0	2	0	—		42	1
Burnley	2005–06	Championship	37	0	1	0	2	0	—		40	0
Burnley	2006–07	Championship	19	0	0	0	1	0	—		20	0
Burnley	Total		92	1	5	0	5	0	—		102	1
Huddersfield Town (loan)	2006–07	League One	13	0	—		—		—		13	0
Huddersfield Town	2007–08	League One	29	0	5	0	1	0	0	0	35	0
Huddersfield Town	Total		42	0	5	0	1	0	0	0	48	0
Lincoln City	2008–09	League Two	23	0	0	0	0	0	1 (Note: Appearance in Football League Trophy)	0	24	0
Wycombe Wanderers (loan)	2008–09	League Two	9	0	—		—		—		9	0
Wrexham	2009–10	Conference Premier	18	0	2	0	—		0	0	20	0
Wrexham	2010–11	Conference Premier	39	0	1	0	—		3 (Note: Two appearances in Conference Premier play-offs, one in FA Trophy)	0	43	0
Wrexham	Total		57	0	3	0	—		3	0	63	0
Hendon	2011–12	IL Premier Division	10	0	—		—		—		10	0
Colwyn Bay	2011–12	Conference North	18	2	—		—		—		18	2
Colwyn Bay	2012–13	Conference North	34	4	1	0	—		0	0	35	4
Colwyn Bay	2013–14	Conference North	11	0	1	0	—		1 (Note: Appearance in FA Trophy)	0	13	0
Colwyn Bay	2014–15	Conference North	3	2	0	0	—		0	0	3	2
Colwyn Bay	Total		66	8	2	0	—		1	0	69	8
Brackley Town	2014–15	Conference North	12	0	—		—		—		12	0
Brackley Town	2015–16	Conference North	1	0	—		—		—		1	0
Brackley Town	Total		13	0	—		—		—		13	0
Career total			651	20	43	2	44	2	18	3	756	27

=== International ===
Appearances and goals by national team and year
National team	Year	Apps	Goals
Jamaica	1998	9	0
Jamaica	1999	5	0
Jamaica	2000	5	0
Jamaica	2001	6	0
Jamaica	2003	3	0
Total		28	0

=== Managerial ===
As of match played 23 January 2021

Managerial record by team and tenure
Team	From	To	Record					Ref.
Team	From	To	P	W	D	L	Win %	Ref.
Colwyn Bay	11 February 2013	5 January 2015	93	30	28	35	32.3	
Brackley Town (caretaker)	8 September 2015	20 September 2015	3	0	3	0	0.0	
Hednesford Town	15 December 2015	15 April 2016	20	3	6	11	15.0	
Total			116	33	37	46	28.4	

== Honours ==
=== As a player ===
Chelsea

- FA Cup: 1996–97; runner-up: 1993–94
- Football League Cup: 1997–98
- UEFA Cup Winners' Cup: 1997–98

Leicester City

- Football League Cup: 1999–2000; runner-up: 1998–99
- Football League First Division second-place promotion: 2002–03

Wycombe Wanderers

- Football League Two third-place promotion: 2008–09

Individual

- Chelsea Player of the Year: 1992–93

=== As a manager ===
Colwyn Bay

- Conference North Manager of the Month: April 2013, December 2013
