= Paul Hughes (footballer) =

English footballer and manager

Personal information
- Date of birth: 19 April 1976 (age 50)
- Place of birth: Hammersmith, London, England

Youth career
- Chelsea

Senior career*
| Years | Team | Apps | (Gls) |
| 1994–2000 | Chelsea | 22 | (2) |
| 1998–1999 | → Stockport County (loan) | 7 | (0) |
| 1999 | → Norwich City (loan) | 4 | (1) |
| 1990–2000 | → Crewe Alexandra (loan) | 0 | (0) |
| 2000–2001 | Southampton | 0 | (0) |
| 2001–2006 | Luton Town | 79 | (7) |
| Total | | 112 | (10) |

Managerial career
- 2012–2016: Kings Langley (joint manager)
- 2016–2017: Hayes & Yeading United (joint manager)
- 2017–2023: Hayes & Yeading United
- 2025: Wealdstone (interim)
- * Club domestic league appearances and goals

John Paul Hughes (born 19 April 1976 in Hammersmith) is an English football manager and retired footballer who played in midfield. He was most recently assistant and then interim manager of Wealdstone.

== Playing career ==
Hughes began his career with his local side, Chelsea, and started well, scoring on his debut against Derby County with an impressive solo effort which was featured on the BBC's goal of the month competition.

Thereafter, however, his career was stalled by injuries, successive managers' squad rotation policies and the signing of other midfielders like Roberto Di Matteo, Gustavo Poyet and Didier Deschamps. Chelsea won the 1996–97 FA Cup; Hughes was left out of the squad for the final but played in the previous rounds including an impressive performance in the 4–1 win over Portsmouth in the quarter-final. The following year Chelsea won the European Cup Winners Cup (1997–98) and although Hughes played in the earlier rounds of the competition he made the squad but did not make the bench for the final in Stockholm.

Over the next three years he featured in 24 more games for the club, and had successful loan spells with Stockport County, Crewe Alexandra and Norwich City (where he scored against Swindon Town). Hughes was recruited by Southampton, then managed by his old Chelsea manager Glenn Hoddle, on a free transfer in the summer of 2000, but due to a lengthy groin injury and subsequent change of manager, left a year later. Hughes' next club was Luton Town, where he remained until May 2006, making 88 appearances and scoring seven goals for the club helping them gain promotion from League 2 and become champions of League 1.

== Coaching and management career ==
In 2012, Hughes was appointed joint manager at Kings Langley alongside Ritchie Hanlon. The pair led Kings Langley to three consecutive promotions in 2014, 2015 and 2016. They finished second in Spartan South Midlands Division One in 2014, and then won the Spartan South Midlands Premier Division title in 2015. The third consecutive promotion saw Kings Langley FC become champions of the Southern Central Division and took the club to the Southern Premier Division for the first time in its history.

Hughes, alongside Hanlon, moved to Hayes & Yeading United in November 2016. Hughes became the sole manager following Hanlon's departure in 2017.

Hughes took Hayes & Yeading FC to a 3rd-place finish in the Isthmian League South Central Division in 2018 but lost 1–0 to Cambridge City in the playoffs. The following year saw his team break a number of club records to secure the Isthmian League South Central title in 2019. An impressive +93 goal difference and a remarkable 129 goals scored ensured Hayes & Yeading FC would play Step 3 football in the Southern Premier the following season.

The 2019–20 season saw Hayes & Yeading FC go on a superb FA Cup run by reaching the first round proper, only to lose 2–0 at home to Karl Robinson's League One Oxford United in a live BT televised game at the SKYEX Community Stadium.

The 2019–20 Southern Premier League season ended prematurely due to the COVID-19 pandemic with Hughes's team sitting in third place.

On 28 April 2023, Hughes retired as Hayes & Yeading manager.

On 10 May 2024, Hughes was appointed as assistant manager of National League club Wealdstone, as part of new manager Matt Taylor's coaching staff. Following a spell as caretaker manager following Taylor's departure, Hughes departed the club in January 2025 following the appointment of Neil Gibson.
