= 2001–02 Chelsea F.C. season =

English football club season

Chelsea
2001–02 season
- Chairman: Ken Bates
- Manager: Claudio Ranieri
- FA Premier League: 6th
- FA Cup: Runners-up
- League Cup: Semi-finals
- UEFA Cup: Second round
- Top goalscorer: League: Jimmy Floyd Hasselbaink (23); All: Jimmy Floyd Hasselbaink (29)
- Average home league attendance: League: 39,030
Home colours	Away colours	Third colours

The 2001–02 season was Chelsea's 88th competitive season, 10th consecutive season in the Premier League and 96th year as a club.

== Season summary ==
The 2001–02 campaign was the first full season under Italian manager Claudio Ranieri, who had replaced his compatriot Gianluca Vialli after five matches of the previous season. He made his first signing in the shape of French defender William Gallas for £6.2 million from Marseille, before signing Frank Lampard from West Ham United for £11 million on 14 June. Lampard went on to become Chelsea's highest goal scorer of all time. The signing of Lampard allowed Chelsea to part company with their captain Dennis Wise, who ended his successful 12-season spell at the club by joining Leicester City for £1.6 million. The third and final signing of the window was of French midfielder and 1998 FIFA World Cup winner Emmanuel Petit, who joined from Barcelona for £7.5 million on 26 June.

Chelsea players encountered controversy in the second round of the UEFA Cup, when they were due to face Hapoel Tel Aviv on 18 October 2001. Six Chelsea first-team players—Albert Ferrer, William Gallas, Emmanuel Petit, Graeme Le Saux, Eiður Guðjohnsen and captain Marcel Desailly—did not fly to Israel due to fears since the September 11 attacks in the previous month and recent Palestinian insurgency. Chelsea lost the match 2–0, with Desailly's replacement, the Ugandan teenager Joel Kitamirike, making mistakes in his only match for Chelsea. The six players returned for the second leg at Stamford Bridge, but a 1–1 draw saw Chelsea eliminated by an underdog for the second consecutive season.

The club came sixth in the Premier League, as they had done the previous season, and reached their third FA Cup final in six seasons. In the final against London rivals and Premier League champions Arsenal at the Millennium Stadium in Cardiff on 4 May 2002, Chelsea lost 2–0 with both goals in the last twenty minutes of the match. Chelsea were led out into the final by Roberto Di Matteo, who had announced his retirement earlier in the season due to a long-term absence with a leg fracture.

== First team squad ==
Squad at end of season

Note: Flags indicate national team as defined under FIFA eligibility rules; some limited exceptions apply. Players may hold more than one non-FIFA nationality.

No.	Pos.	Nation	Player
1	GK	NED	Ed de Goey
3	DF	NGR	Celestine Babayaro
6	DF	FRA	Marcel Desailly
8	MF	ENG	Frank Lampard
9	FW	NED	Jimmy Floyd Hasselbaink
10	MF	YUG	Slaviša Jokanović
11	MF	NED	Boudewijn Zenden
12	FW	CRO	Mario Stanić
13	DF	FRA	William Gallas
14	DF	ENG	Graeme Le Saux
15	DF	NED	Mario Melchiot
17	MF	FRA	Emmanuel Petit
18	MF	ESP	Albert Ferrer
20	MF	ENG	Jody Morris

No.	Pos.	Nation	Player
22	FW	ISL	Eiður Guðjohnsen
23	GK	ITA	Carlo Cudicini
24	MF	ITA	Samuele Dalla Bona
25	FW	ITA	Gianfranco Zola
26	DF	ENG	John Terry
28	FW	ENG	Leon Knight
29	DF	GER	Robert Huth
30	FW	DEN	Jesper Grønkjær
31	GK	AUS	Mark Bosnich
32	FW	FIN	Mikael Forssell
33	DF	ENG	Joel Kitamirike
36	MF	ENG	Joe Keenan
39	FW	ENG	Carlton Cole

=== Left club during season ===
Note: Flags indicate national team as defined under FIFA eligibility rules; some limited exceptions apply. Players may hold more than one non-FIFA nationality.

No.	Pos.	Nation	Player
16	MF	ITA	Roberto Di Matteo (retired)
18	MF	ITA	Gabriele Ambrosetti (on loan to Piacenza)

No.	Pos.	Nation	Player
34	DF	ENG	Jon Harley (to Fulham)

=== Reserve squad ===
Note: Flags indicate national team as defined under FIFA eligibility rules; some limited exceptions apply. Players may hold more than one non-FIFA nationality.

No.	Pos.	Nation	Player
7	DF	NED	Winston Bogarde
19	DF	ITA	Valerio Di Cesare
27	FW	GEO	Rati Aleksidze
34	DF	ENG	Pat Baldwin
35	GK	ENG	Rhys Evans
37	DF	WAL	Danny Slatter
38	DF	ENG	Scott Cousins
—	GK	ENG	Lenny Pidgeley

No.	Pos.	Nation	Player
—	DF	ENG	Sam Tillen
—	DF	SCO	Warren Cummings
—	DF	ENG	Danny Hollands
—	MF	ENG	Rob Wolleaston
—	MF	NED	Mbark Boussoufa
—	MF	SCO	Ryan Stevenson
—	FW	GER	Sebastian Kneißl

== Team kit ==
The team kit was produced by Umbro and the shirt sponsor was the airline Emirates and bore the "Fly Emirates" logo. Chelsea's home kit was all blue with a white trimmed collar. Their new away kit was all white with blue socks. The club's third kit for this season was orange with blue shorts and accents.

== Statistics ==
No.	Pos	Nat	Player	Total		Premier League		UEFA Cup		FA Cup		Football League Cup	
No.	Pos	Nat	Player	Apps	Goals	Apps	Goals	Apps	Goals	Apps	Goals	Apps	Goals
1	GK	(Netherlands) NED	Ed de Goeij	8	0	6	0	2	0	0	0	0	0
3	DF	(Nigeria) NGR	Celestine Babayaro	28	0	18	0	2	0	4	0	3+1	0
6	DF	(France) FRA	Marcel Desailly	37	1	24	1	2	0	8	0	3	0
8	MF	(England) ENG	Frank Lampard	53	7	34+3	5	4	1	7+1	1	4	0
9	FW	(Netherlands) NED	Jimmy Floyd Hasselbaink	48	29	35	23	2	0	7	3	4	3
10	MF	(Federal Republic of Yugoslavia) YUG	Slaviša Jokanović	31	0	12+8	0	3	0	1+4	0	2+1	0
11	MF	(Netherlands) NED	Boudewijn Zenden	32	3	13+9	3	3	0	0+3	0	2+2	0
12	FW	(Croatia) CRO	Mario Stanić	35	2	18+9	1	2	0	4	1	1+1	0
13	DF	(France) FRA	William Gallas	41	2	27+3	1	3	0	4	1	4	0
14	DF	(England) ENG	Graeme Le Saux	40	2	26+1	1	2	0	8	1	3	0
15	DF	(Netherlands) NED	Mario Melchiot	50	2	35+2	2	3	0	5+1	0	4	0
17	MF	(France) FRA	Emmanuel Petit	38	1	26+1	1	3	0	6	0	2	0
18	DF	(Spain) ESP	Albert Ferrer	10	0	2+2	0	0	0	3+1	0	2	0
20	MF	(England) ENG	Jody Morris	10	0	2+3	0	0+1	0	1+1	0	1+1	0
22	FW	(Iceland) ISL	Eiður Guðjohnsen	47	23	26+6	14	3	3	6+1	3	5	3
23	GK	(Italy) ITA	Carlo Cudicini	41	0	27+1	0	0	0	8	0	5	0
24	MF	(Italy) ITA	Samuele Dalla Bona	38	4	16+8	4	0+3	0	4+2	0	3+2	0
25	FW	(Italy) ITA	Gianfranco Zola	50	5	19+16	3	3+1	1	4+2	1	2+3	0
26	DF	(England) ENG	John Terry	43	4	32+1	1	2	1	3+2	2	3	0
28	FW	(England) ENG	Leon Knight	1	0	0	0	0+1	0	0	0	0	0
29	DF	(Germany) GER	Robert Huth	1	0	0+1	0	0	0	0	0	0	0
30	FW	(Denmark) DEN	Jesper Grønkjær	16	0	11+2	0	0	0	3	0	0	0
31	GK	(Australia) AUS	Mark Bosnich	7	0	5	0	2	0	0	0	0	0
32	FW	(Finland) FIN	Mikael Forssell	35	9	2+20	4	0+3	0	2+4	3	0+4	2
33	DF	(England) ENG	Joel Kitamirike	1	0	0	0	1	0	0	0	0	0
36	MF	(England) ENG	Joe Keenan	2	0	0+1	0	0	0	0+1	0	0	0
39	FW	(England) ENG	Carlton Cole	3	1	2+1	1	0	0	0	0	0	0

== Transfers ==
=== In ===
#	Pos	Player	From	Fee	Date
13	DF	(France) William Gallas	(France) Marseille	£6,200,000	18-05-2001
8	MF	(England) Frank Lampard	(England) West Ham United	£11,000,000	11-06-2001
17	MF	(France) Emmanuel Petit	(Spain) Barcelona	£7,500,000	26-06-2001
11	MF	(Netherlands) Boudewijn Zenden	(Spain) Barcelona	£7,500,000	02-08-2001

=== Out ===
#	Pos	Player	To	Fee	Date
8	MF	(Uruguay) Gustavo Poyet	(England) Tottenham Hotspur	£2,250,000	10-06-2001
11	MF	(England) Dennis Wise	(England) Leicester City	£2,000,000	25-06-2001
21	DF	(France) Bernard Lambourde	(France) Bastia	Free	29-06-2001
N/A	MF	(England) Jay Richardson	(England) Exeter City	Free	04-07-2001
5	DF	(France) Frank Leboeuf	(France) Marseille	£1,200,000	25-07-2001
34	DF	(England) Jon Harley	(England) Fulham	£3,500,000	08-08-2001

== Premier League ==
=== Classification ===
Pos	Team	Pld	W	D	L	GF	GA	GD	Pts	Qualification or relegation
4	Newcastle United	38	21	8	9	74	52	+22	71	Qualification for the Champions League third qualifying round
5	Leeds United	38	18	12	8	53	37	+16	66	Qualification for the UEFA Cup first round (Note: Since Arsenal qualified for the Champions League, their UEFA Cup place as FA Cup winners defaulted to Chelsea, the losing finalists.)
6	Chelsea	38	17	13	8	66	38	+28	64	Qualification for the UEFA Cup first round
7	West Ham United	38	15	8	15	48	57	−9	53	
8	Aston Villa	38	12	14	12	46	47	−1	50	Qualification for the Intertoto Cup third round

Source: Premier League
Rules for classification: 1) points; 2) goal difference; 3) number of goals scored.

=== Results summary ===
Overall								Home						Away					
Pld	W	D	L	GF	GA	GD	Pts	W	D	L	GF	GA	GD	W	D	L	GF	GA	GD
38	17	13	8	66	38	+28	64	11	4	4	43	21	+22	6	9	4	23	17	+6

=== Matches ===
19 August 2001 1	Chelsea	1–1	Newcastle United	Stamford Bridge, London
14:00	Zenden 8'	Report	Acuña 77'	Attendance: 40,124; Referee: Andy D'Urso

25 August 2001 2	Southampton	0–2	Chelsea	St Mary's Stadium, Southampton
15:00			Hasselbaink 33'; Stanić 90'	Attendance: 31,107; Referee: David Elleray

8 September 2001 3	Chelsea	1–1	Arsenal	Stamford Bridge, London
15:00	Hasselbaink 31' (pen.)	Report	Henry 17'	Attendance: 40,855; Referee: Mike Riley

16 September 2001 4	Tottenham Hotspur	2–3	Chelsea	White Hart Lane, London
15:00	Sheringham 66', 90'	Report	Hasselbaink 45', 81' (pen.); Desailly 90'	Attendance: 36,037; Referee: Steve Dunn

23 September 2001 5	Chelsea	2–2	Middlesbrough	Stamford Bridge, London
14:00	Hasselbaink 3', 37'	Report	Stockdale 61'; Bokšić 90' (pen.)	Attendance: 36,767; Referee: Rob Styles

30 September 2001 6	Fulham	1–1	Chelsea	Craven Cottage, London
12:00	Hayles 56'	Report	Hasselbaink 32'	Attendance: 21,159; Referee: Graham Poll

13 October 2001 7	Chelsea	2–0	Leicester City	Stamford Bridge, London
15:00	Hasselbaink 20' (pen.); Guðjohnsen 45'	Report		Attendance: 40,370; Referee: Jeff Winter

21 October 2001 8	Leeds United	0–0	Chelsea	Elland Road, Leeds
16:00		Report		Attendance: 40,171; Referee: Paul Durkin

24 October 2001 9	West Ham United	2–1	Chelsea	Upton Park, London
19:45	Carrick 5'; Kanouté 13'	Report	Hasselbaink 22'	Attendance: 26,520; Referee: Dermot Gallagher

28 October 2001 10	Derby County	1–1	Chelsea	Pride Park, Derby
16:00	Ravanelli 7'	Report	Hasselbaink 48'	Attendance: 28,910; Referee: Steve Bennett

4 November 2001 11	Chelsea	2–1	Ipswich Town	Stamford Bridge, London
14:00	Zola 36'; Dalla Bona 90+1'	Report	Stewart 63' (pen.)	Attendance: 40,497; Referee: Rob Styles

18 November 2001 12	Everton	0–0	Chelsea	Goodison Park, Liverpool
15:00		Report		Attendance: 30,555; Referee: Mark Halsey

24 November 2001 13	Chelsea	0–0	Blackburn Rovers	Stamford Bridge, London
15:00		Report		Attendance: 37,978; Referee: Graham Poll

1 December 2001 14	Manchester United	0–3	Chelsea	Old Trafford, Manchester
15:00		Report	Melchiot 6'; Hasselbaink 64'; Guðjohnsen 84'	Attendance: 67,544; Referee: Alan Wiley

5 December 2001 15	Chelsea	0–1	Charlton Athletic	Stamford Bridge, London
20:00		Report	Lisbie 90'	Attendance: 33,504; Referee: Dermot Gallagher

9 December 2001 16	Sunderland	0–0	Chelsea	Stadium of Light, Sunderland
15:00		Report		Attendance: 48,017; Referee: Neale Barry

16 December 2001 17	Chelsea	4–0	Liverpool	Stamford Bridge, London
16:00	Le Saux 3'; Hasselbaink 28'; Dalla Bona 71'; Guðjohnsen 90'	Report		Attendance: 41,174; Referee: Mark Halsey

23 December 2001 18	Chelsea	5–1	Bolton Wanderers	Stamford Bridge, London
13:30	Guðjohnsen 41'; Zenden 45'; Hasselbaink 46'; Hendry 76' (o.g.); Lampard 87'	Report	Nolan 3'	Attendance: 34,063; Referee: Uriah Rennie

26 December 2001 19	Arsenal	2–1	Chelsea	Arsenal Stadium, London
19:45	Campbell 49'; Wiltord 71'	Report	Lampard 31'	Attendance: 38,079; Referee: Graham Barber

29 December 2001 20	Newcastle United	1–2	Chelsea	St James' Park, Newcastle upon Tyne
15:00	Shearer 37'	Report	Guðjohnsen 35', 45'	Attendance: 52,123; Referee: Steve Bennett

1 January 2002 21	Chelsea	2–4	Southampton	Stamford Bridge, London
19:45	Guðjohnsen 20'; Hasselbaink 45'	Report	Beattie 7', 73'; Pahars 55'; Marsden 64'	Attendance: 35,156; Referee: Eddie Wolstenholme

12 January 2002 22	Bolton Wanderers	2–2	Chelsea	Reebok Stadium, Horwich
19:45	Ricketts 56'; Nolan 79'	Report	Guðjohnsen 53'; Forssell 65'	Attendance: 23,891; Referee: Jeff Winter

20 January 2002 23	Chelsea	5–1	West Ham United	Stamford Bridge, London
14:00	Hasselbaink 45', 60'; Guðjohnsen 51', 87'; Forssell 90'	Report	Defoe 88'	Attendance: 40,035; Referee: Andy D'Urso

30 January 2002 24	Chelsea	2–0	Leeds United	Stamford Bridge, London
19:45	Guðjohnsen 2'; Dalla Bona 31'	Report		Attendance: 40,614; Referee: Steve Bennett

2 February 2002 25	Leicester City	2–3	Chelsea	Filbert Street, Leicester
15:00	Scowcroft 24', 68'	Report	Hasselbaink 62', 90'; Zola 79'	Attendance: 19,950; Referee: Graham Barber

9 February 2002 26	Aston Villa	1–1	Chelsea	Villa Park, Birmingham
15:00	Merson 28'	Report	Lampard 66'	Attendance: 41,137; Referee: Paul Durkin

2 March 2002 27	Charlton Athletic	2–1	Chelsea	The Valley, London
15:00	Euell 72', 89'	Report	Lampard 23'	Attendance: 26,354; Referee: Graham Poll

6 March 2002 28	Chelsea	3–2	Fulham	Stamford Bridge, London
19:45	Melchiot 18'; Guðjohnsen 29'; Forssell 82'	Report	Saha 20' (pen.), 73'	Attendance: 39,744; Referee: Peter Jones

13 March 2002 29	Chelsea	4–0	Tottenham Hotspur	Stamford Bridge, London
15:00	Hasselbaink 24', 69', 81'; Lampard 90'	Report	Taricco (red card)	Attendance: 39,652; Referee: Alan Wiley

16 March 2002 30	Chelsea	4–0	Sunderland	Stamford Bridge, London
15:00	Gallas 24'; Guðjohnsen 73'; Forssell 84'; Dalla Bona 90'	Report		Attendance: 40,218; Referee: Barry Knight

24 March 2002 31	Liverpool	1–0	Chelsea	Anfield, Liverpool
14:00	Šmicer 90'	Report		Attendance: 44,203; Referee: Mike Halsey

30 March 2002 32	Chelsea	2–1	Derby County	Stamford Bridge, London
15:00	Terry 50'; Petit 86'	Report	Strupar 60'	Attendance: 37,849; Referee: Mike Dean

1 April 2002 33	Ipswich Town	0–0	Chelsea	Portman Road, Ipswich
20:00		Report		Attendance: 28,053; Referee: Eddie Wolstenholme

6 April 2002 34	Chelsea	3–0	Everton	Stamford Bridge, London
15:00	Hasselbaink 26', 44'; Zola 90'	Report		Attendance: 40,545; Referee: David Elleray

10 April 2002 35	Blackburn Rovers	0–0	Chelsea	Ewood Park, Blackburn
20:00		Report		Attendance: 25,441; Referee: Steve Dunn

20 April 2002 36	Chelsea	0–3	Manchester United	Stamford Bridge, London
15:00			Scholes 15' van Nistelrooy 61'; Solskjær 86'	Attendance: 41,725; Referee: Graham Barber

27 April 2002 37	Middlesbrough	0–2	Chelsea	Riverside Stadium, Middlesbrough
15:00		Report	Cole 38'; Zenden 43'	Attendance: 28,686; Referee: Barry Knight

11 May 2002 38	Chelsea	1–3	Aston Villa	Stamford Bridge, London
15:00	Guðjohnsen 70' (pen.)	Report	Crouch 21'; Vassell 63'; Dublin 88'	Attendance: 40,709; Referee: Steve Bennett

== UEFA Cup ==
=== First round ===
20 September 2001 1st leg	Chelsea (England)	3–0	(Bulgaria) Levski Sofia	Stamford Bridge, London
21:00	Guðjohnsen 45', 74'; Lampard 90'; Zenden (yellow card) 82'	Report		Attendance: 20,812; Referee: Helmut Fleischer (Germany)

27 September 2001 2nd leg	Levski Sofia (Bulgaria)	0–2	(England) Chelsea	Georgi Asparuhov Stadium, Sofia
19:30	Markov (yellow card) 12'; Topuzakov (yellow card) 30'	Report	Terry 33'; Guðjohnsen 45'	Attendance: 10,000; Referee: Martin Ingvarsson (Sweden)

=== Second round ===
18 October 2001 1st leg	Hapoel Tel Aviv (Israel)	2–0	(England) Chelsea	Bloomfield Stadium, Tel Aviv
19:15	Gershon 87' (pen.); Cleşcenco 90+4'	Report	Zenden (yellow card) 27'; Melchiot (red card) 53'	Attendance: 11,500; Referee: Dick van Egmond (Netherlands)

1 November 2001 2nd leg	Chelsea (England)	1–1	(Israel) Hapoel Tel Aviv	Stamford Bridge, London
21:00	Zola 64'; Terry (yellow card) 67'; Hasselbaink (yellow card) 89'	Report	Osterc 35'; Gershon (yellow card) 44'; Domb (yellow card) 58'; Antebi (yellow card) 62'; Elimelech (yellow card) 82'	Attendance: 28,433; Referee: Laurent Duhamel (France)

== FA Cup ==
5 January 2002 Third round	Norwich City	0–0	Chelsea	Carrow Road, Norwich
		Report		Attendance: 21,017; Referee: Peter Jones

16 January 2002 Replay	Chelsea	4–0	Norwich City	Stamford Bridge, London
	Stanic 11'; Lampard 56'; Zola 63'; Forssell 89'	Report		Attendance: 24,231; Referee: Peter Jones

26 January 2002 Fourth round	Chelsea	1–1	West Ham United	Stamford Bridge, London
15:00	Hasselbaink 20'	Report	Kanouté 84'	Attendance: 33,443; Referee: David Elleray

6 February 2002 Replay	West Ham United	2–3	Chelsea	Upton Park, London
	Defoe 37', 50'	Report	Hasselbaink 42'; Forssell 64'; Terry 90+2'	Attendance: 27,272; Referee: Graham Poll

17 February 2002 Fifth Round	Chelsea	3–1	Preston North End	Stamford Bridge, London
	Guðjohnsen 15'; Hasselbaink 26'; Forssell 90'	Report	Cresswell 9'	Attendance: 28,133; Referee: Rob Styles

10 March 2002 Quarter-final	Tottenham Hotspur	0–4	Chelsea	White Hart Lane, London
16:00		Report	Gallas 12'; Guðjohnsen 48', 66'; Le Saux 54'	Attendance: 32,896; Referee: Andy D'Urso

14 April 2002 Semi-final	Fulham	0–1	Chelsea	Villa Park, Birmingham
19:00		Report	Terry 40'	Attendance: 36,147; Referee: Graham Poll

4 May 2002 Final	Arsenal	2–0	Chelsea	Millennium Stadium, Cardiff
15:00	Parlour 70'; Ljungberg 80'	Report		Attendance: 73,963; Referee: Mike Riley

== League Cup ==
9 October 2001 Third round	Coventry City	0–2	Chelsea	Highfield Road, Coventry
		Report	Guðjohnsen 56'; Forssell 60'	Attendance: 12,582; Referee: Paul Durkin

28 November 2001 Fourth round	Leeds United	0–2	Chelsea	Elland Road, Leeds
		Report	Guðjohnsen 59', 80'	Attendance: 33,841; Referee: Jeff Winter

12 December 2001 Quarter-final	Chelsea	1–0	Newcastle United	Stamford Bridge, London
	Hasselbaink 90'	Report		Attendance: 27,613; Referee: David Elleray

9 January 2002 Semi-final 1st leg	Chelsea	2–1	Tottenham Hotspur	Stamford Bridge, London
	Hasselbaink 10', 76'	Report	Ferdinand 65'	Attendance: 37,264; Referee: Alan Wiley

23 January 2002 Semi-final 2nd leg	Tottenham Hotspur	5–1	Chelsea	White Hart Lane, London
	Iversen 2'; Sherwood 32'; Sheringham 50'; Davies 76'; Rebrov 87'	Report	Forssell 90'	Attendance: 36,100; Referee: Mark Halsey
