= 1999–2000 Chelsea F.C. season =

English football club season

Chelsea
1999–2000 season
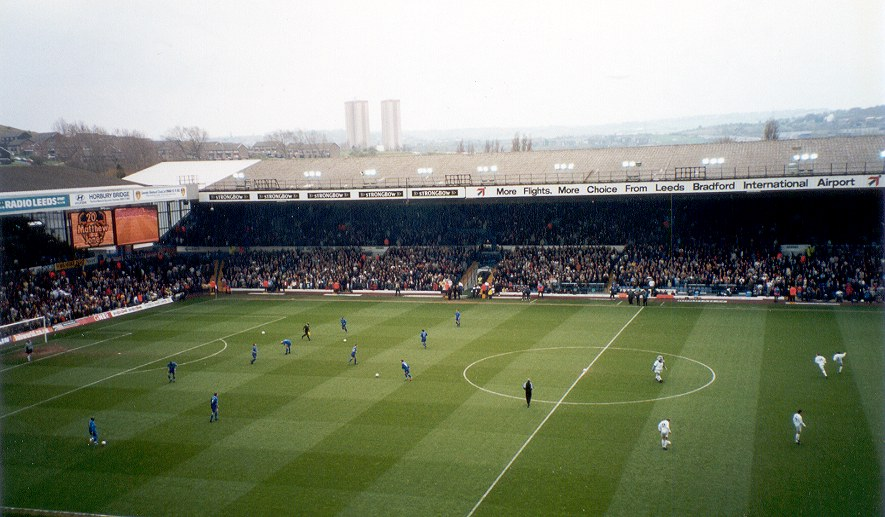
- Chelsea players before a match against Leeds United at Elland Road on 1 April 2000
- Chairman: Ken Bates
- Manager: Gianluca Vialli
- Premier League: 5th
- FA Cup: Winners
- League Cup: Third round
- UEFA Champions League: Quarter-finals
- Top goalscorer: League: Tore André Flo; Gus Poyet (10 each); All: Tore André Flo (19)
- Highest home attendance: 35,113 (vs. Everton, 11 May 2000)
- Lowest home attendance: 21,008 (vs. Huddersfield Town, 13 October 1999)
| Home colours | Away colours | Third colours |

The 1999–2000 season was Chelsea F.C.'s 86th competitive season, eighth consecutive season in the FA Premier League and 94th year as a club.

== Season summary ==
After a very good third-place finish last season, Chelsea qualified for the Champions League third qualifying round, and were expected to go one better and win the title. France captain Didier Deschamps was signed for £3 million from Juventus to add even more quality and experience to a Chelsea midfield that already boasted Dennis Wise, Roberto Di Matteo and Gustavo Poyet. Blackburn Rovers striker Chris Sutton was also signed for £10 million, but he proved to be a flop with only one league goal all season, which came in a 5-0 drubbing of Man Utd at Stamford Bridge. His strike partner, Gianfranco Zola, had a poor league season by his standard, scoring just four goals, but he made up for that by again setting up many more goals for the team. Chelsea opened the season with 4–0 win over newly promoted Sunderland with Gus Poyet scoring a stunning scissors kick goal. Zola, in contrast to his average league form, made Europe sit up and notice as he led Chelsea's Champions league debut appearance in the group stage. Chelsea were drawn against AC Milan, Hertha Berlin and Galatasary with their first game being against AC Milan at Stamford Bridge. Chelsea topped Group H with 11 points after some standout performances, particularly an impressive 5–0 win in Turkey and two creditable draws home and away with AC Milan.

Zola scored a spectacular free kick in a 3–1 win over F.C. Barcelona at Stamford Bridge, but Chelsea were eliminated in the second leg at the Nou Camp. On the Premier league front, Gianluca Vialli's side finished a solid fifth place in the final table but were too inconsistent to mount anything like a title challenge. Chelsea won their fourth cup in four seasons with a 2000 FA Cup Final win 1-0 over Aston Villa at Wembley, after David James dropped the ball from a Chelsea corner allowing Di Matteo to score. Chelsea had the last cup final triumph at the old Wembley stadium before it was rebuilt. Gus Poyet was key during Chelsea's FA cup run, scoring a hat trick against Hull at Boothferry Park in a 6–1 win and netting twice against Newcastle at Wembley.

On 26 December 1999, in their 1–2 away win over Southampton, Chelsea became the first team in the Football League history to field a starting eleven without an English player. The squad was made up of: Ed de Goey, Albert Ferrer, Franck Leboeuf, Emerson Thome, Celestine Babayaro, Deschamps, Dan Petrescu, Di Matteo, Poyet, Gabriele Ambrosetti and Tore André Flo.

== Final league table ==
| Pos | Team | Pld | W | D | L | GF | GA | GD | Pts | Qualification or relegation |
|---|---|---|---|---|---|---|---|---|---|---|
| 3 | Leeds United | 38 | 21 | 6 | 11 | 58 | 43 | +15 | 69 | Qualification for the Champions League third qualifying round |
| 4 | Liverpool | 38 | 19 | 10 | 9 | 51 | 30 | +21 | 67 | Qualification for the UEFA Cup first round (Note: Chelsea qualified for the UEFA Cup as FA Cup winners.) |
| 5 | Chelsea | 38 | 18 | 11 | 9 | 53 | 34 | +19 | 65 | Qualification for the UEFA Cup first round |
| 6 | Aston Villa | 38 | 15 | 13 | 10 | 46 | 35 | +11 | 58 | Qualification for the Intertoto Cup third round |
| 7 | Sunderland | 38 | 16 | 10 | 12 | 57 | 56 | +1 | 58 | |

Source: Premier League
Rules for classification: 1) points; 2) goal difference; 3) number of goals scored.
Notes:

Results summary

| Overall | | | | | | | | Home | | | | | | Away | | | | | |
| Pld | W | D | L | GF | GA | GD | Pts | W | D | L | GF | GA | GD | W | D | L | GF | GA | GD |
|---|---|---|---|---|---|---|---|---|---|---|---|---|---|---|---|---|---|---|---|
| 38 | 18 | 11 | 9 | 53 | 34 | +19 | 65 | 12 | 5 | 2 | 35 | 12 | +23 | 6 | 6 | 7 | 18 | 22 | −4 |

Source: 1999–2000 FA Premier League table

Results by round

| Round | 1 | 2 | 3 | 4 | 5 | 6 | 7 | 8 | 9 | 10 | 11 | 12 | 13 | 14 | 15 | 16 | 17 | 18 | 19 | 20 | 21 | 22 | 23 | 24 | 25 | 26 | 27 | 28 | 29 | 30 | 31 | 32 | 33 | 34 | 35 | 36 | 37 | 38 |
|---|---|---|---|---|---|---|---|---|---|---|---|---|---|---|---|---|---|---|---|---|---|---|---|---|---|---|---|---|---|---|---|---|---|---|---|---|---|---|
| Ground | H | A | H | A | H | A | A | H | A | H | A | H | A | H | A | H | A | H | A | A | H | H | A | A | H | H | A | H | A | H | A | H | A | H | A | H | A | H |
| Result | W | D | W | W | W | L | W | W | L | L | L | D | D | W | L | L | W | W | D | D | W | D | D | W | W | W | W | D | D | D | W | W | L | D | L | W | L | W |
| Position | 1 | 6 | 4 | 3 | 2 | 5 | 5 | 4 | 6 | 7 | 8 | 9 | 9 | 8 | 8 | 10 | 9 | 7 | 7 | 7 | 6 | 6 | 6 | 5 | 5 | 5 | 3 | 3 | 4 | 4 | 5 | 4 | 4 | 5 | 5 | 4 | 5 | 5 |

Source: 11v11.com: 1999–2000 Chelsea results
A = Away; H = Home; W = Win; D = Draw; L = Loss

== Results ==
=== FA Premier League ===
| 7 August 1999 1 | Chelsea | 4–0 | Sunderland | Fulham, London |
| | Poyet 20', 56'; Zola 32'; Flo 77' | Report | | Stadium: Stamford Bridge; Referee: Mike Riley |

| 15 August 1999 2 | Leicester City | 2–2 | Chelsea | Leicester, Leicestershire |
| | Heskey 10'; Izzet 90' (pen.) | Report | Wise 48'; F. Sinclair 90+3' (o.g.) | Stadium: Filbert Street; Referee: Stephen Lodge |

| 21 August 1999 3 | Chelsea | 1–0 | Aston Villa | Fulham, London |
| | Ehiogu 52' (o.g.) | Report | | Stadium: Stamford Bridge; Referee: Neale Barry |

| 28 August 1999 4 | Wimbledon | 0–1 | Chelsea | London |
| | | Report | Petrescu 78' | Stadium: Selhurst Park; Referee: Steve Dunn |

| 11 September 1999 5 | Chelsea | 1–0 | Newcastle United | Fulham, London |
| | Leboeuf 37' (pen.) | Report | | Stadium: Stamford Bridge; Referee: Graham Poll |

| 18 September 1999 6 | Watford | 1–0 | Chelsea | Watford, Hertfordshire |
| | Smart 57' | Report | | Stadium: Vicarage Road; Referee: Mike Reed |

| 25 September 1999 7 | Middlesbrough | 0–1 | Chelsea | Middlesbrough, North Yorkshire |
| | | Report | Lambourde 54' | Referee: Paul Alcock |

| 3 October 1999 8 | Chelsea | 5–0 | Manchester United | Fulham, London |
| | Poyet 1', 55'; Sutton 16'; Berg 58' (o.g.); Morris 82' | Report | | Stadium: Stamford Bridge; Referee: Dermot Gallagher |

| 16 October 1999 9 | Liverpool | 1–0 | Chelsea | Liverpool |
| | Thompson 47' | Report | Desailly (red card) 75'; Wise (red card) 88' | Stadium: Anfield; Referee: Mike Reed |

| 23 October 1999 10 | Chelsea | 2–3 | Arsenal | Fulham, London |
| | Flo 38'; Petrescu 52' | Report | Kanu 75', 83', 90' | Stadium: Stamford Bridge; Referee: Alan Wilkie |

| 30 October 1999 11 | Derby County | 3–1 | Chelsea | Derby, Derbyshire |
| | Burton 7'; Delap 80', 88' | [ Report] | Leboeuf 10' | Stadium: Pride Park Stadium |

| 7 November 1999 12 | Chelsea | 0–0 | West Ham United | Fulham, London |
| | | Report | | Stadium: Stamford Bridge; Referee: Mike Riley |

| 20 November 1999 13 | Everton | 1–1 | Chelsea | Liverpool |
| | K. Campbell 15' | Report | Flo 90' | Stadium: Goodison Park; Referee: Mark Halsey |

| 28 November 1999 14 | Chelsea | 1–0 | Bradford City | Fulham, London |
| | Flo 15' | Report | | Stadium: Stamford Bridge; Referee: Alan Wiley |

| 4 December 1999 15 | Sunderland | 4–1 | Chelsea | Sunderland |
| | Quinn 1', 38'; Phillips 23', 36' | Report | Poyet 81' | Stadium: Stadium of Light; Referee: Steve Dunn |

| 19 December 1999 16 | Chelsea | 0–2 | Leeds United | Fulham, London |
| | Leboeuf (red card) 76' | Report | McPhail 66', 87' | Stadium: Stamford Bridge; Referee: Jeff Winter |

| 26 December 1999 17 | Southampton | 1–2 | Chelsea | Southampton, Hampshire |
| | Davies 80' | Report | Flo 18', 43' | Stadium: The Dell; Referee: Paul Alcock |

| 29 December 1999 18 | Chelsea | 3–0 | Sheffield Wednesday | Fulham, London |
| | Wise 31'; Flo 35'; Morris 84' | Report | | Stadium: Stamford Bridge; Referee: Andy D'Urso |

| 4 January 2000 19 | Coventry City | 2–2 | Chelsea | Coventry, West Midlands |
| | Roussel 54'; Keane 82' | Report | Flo 55', 83' | Stadium: Highfield Road; Referee: Paul Durkin |

| 8 January 2000 20 | Bradford City | 1–1 | Chelsea | Bradford, West Yorkshire |
| | Mills 1' | Report | Petrescu 58' | Stadium: Valley Parade; Referee: Alan Wiley |

| 12 January 2000 21 | Chelsea | 1–0 | Tottenham Hotspur | Fulham, London |
| | Weah 86' | Report | | Stadium: Stamford Bridge; Referee: Neale Barry |

| 15 January 2000 22 | Chelsea | 1–1 | Leicester City | Fulham, London |
| | Wise 85' | Report | Taggart 41' | Stadium: Stamford Bridge; Referee: Graham Barber |

| 22 January 2000 23 | Aston Villa | 0–0 | Chelsea | Birmingham, West Midlands |
| | | Report | | Stadium: Villa Park; Referee: Alan Wilkie |

| 5 February 2000 24 | Tottenham Hotspur | 0–1 | Chelsea | Haringey, London |
| | | Report | Lambourde 52' | Stadium: White Hart Lane; Referee: Graham Poll |

| 12 February 2000 25 | Chelsea | 3–1 | Wimbledon | Fulham, London |
| | Poyet 79'; Weah 80'; Morris 90' | Report | Lund 73' | Stadium: Stamford Bridge; Referee: Peter Jones |

| 26 February 2000 26 | Chelsea | 2–1 | Watford | Fulham, London |
| | Desailly 2'; Harley 65' | Report | Smart 39' | Stadium: Stamford Bridge; Referee: Steve Dunn |

| 4 March 2000 27 | Newcastle United | 0–1 | Chelsea | Newcastle-upon-Tyne, Tyne and Wear |
| | | Report | Poyet 22' | Stadium: St. James' Park; Referee: Mike Riley |

| 11 March 2000 28 | Chelsea | 1–1 | Everton | Fulham, London |
| | Wise 29' | Report | Cadamarteri 69' | Stadium: Stamford Bridge; Referee: David Elleray |

| 18 March 2000 29 | West Ham United | 0–0 | Chelsea | Newham, London |
| | Stimac (red card) 71' | Report | | Stadium: Boleyn Ground; Referee: Steve Dunn |

| 25 March 2000 30 | Chelsea | 1–1 | Southampton | Fulham, London |
| | Richards 75' (o.g.) | Report | Tessem 69' | Stadium: Stamford Bridge; Referee: Dermot Gallagher |

| 1 April 2000 31 | Leeds United | 0–1 | Chelsea | Leeds, West Yorkshire |
| | | Report | Harley 62' | Stadium: Elland Road; Referee: Jeff Winter |

| 12 April 2000 32 | Chelsea | 2–1 | Coventry City | Fulham, London |
| | Hendry 53' (o.g.); Zola 56' | Report | McAllister 17' | Stadium: Stamford Bridge; Referee: Graham Poll |

| 15 April 2000 33 | Sheffield Wednesday | 1–0 | Chelsea | Sheffield |
| | Jonk 51' (pen.) | Report | | Stadium: Hillsborough Stadium |

| 22 April 2000 34 | Chelsea | 1–1 | Middlesbrough | Fulham, London |
| | Poyet 10' | Report | Ricard 37' | Stadium: Stamford Bridge; Referee: Uriah Rennie |

| 24 April 2000 35 | Manchester United | 3–2 | Chelsea | Trafford, Greater Manchester |
| | Yorke 10', 69'; Solskjær 40' | Report | Petrescu 22'; Zola 36' | Stadium: Old Trafford; Referee: Steve Dunn |

| 29 April 2000 36 | Chelsea | 2–0 | Liverpool | Fulham, London |
| | Weah 2'; Di Matteo 14' | Report | | Stadium: Stamford Bridge; Referee: Graham Barber |

| 6 May 2000 37 | Arsenal | 2–1 | Chelsea | Islington, London |
| | Henry 21', 48' | Report | Poyet 79' | Stadium: Highbury; Referee: Mike Reed |

| 14 May 2000 38 | Chelsea | 4–0 | Derby County | Fulham, London |
| | Zola 46'; Poyet 55'; Di Matteo 69'; Flo 90' | Report | | Stadium: Stamford Bridge; Referee: Jeff Winter |

=== UEFA Champions League ===
==== Third qualifying round ====
| 12 August 1999 1 | Chelsea (England) | 3–0 | (Latvia) Skonto Riga | London, England |
| | Babayaro 76'; Poyet 77'; Sutton 84' | Report | | Stadium: Stamford Bridge; Referee: (Switzerland) Urs Meier |

| 25 August 1999 2 | Skonto Riga (Latvia) | 0–0 | (England) Chelsea | Riga, Latvia |
| | | Report | | Referee: (France) Gilles Veissiere |

==== First group stage ====
| 15 September 1999 1 | Chelsea (England) | 0–0 | (Italy) Milan | London, England |
| | | Report | | Stadium: Stamford Bridge; Attendance: 33,873; Referee: (Sweden) Anders Frisk |

| 21 September 1999 2 | Hertha Berlin (Germany) | 2–1 | (England) Chelsea | Berlin, Germany |
| | Daei 3', 70' | Report | Leboeuf 86' (pen.) | Stadium: Olympiastadion; Attendance: 51,541; Referee: (Belgium) Michel Piraux |

| 29 September 1999 3 | Chelsea (England) | 1–0 | (Turkey) Galatasaray | London, England |
| | Petrescu 55' | Report | | Stadium: Stamford Bridge; Attendance: 33,426; Referee: (Netherlands) Dick Jol |

| 19 October 1999 4 | Galatasaray (Turkey) | 0–5 | (England) Chelsea | Istanbul, Turkey |
| | | | Flo 32', 49'; Zola 54'; Wise; Ambrosetti 87' | Stadium: Ali Sami Yen Stadium; Attendance: 20,600; Referee: (Portugal) Vítor Melo Pereira |

| 26 October 1999 5 | Milan (Italy) | 1–1 | (England) Chelsea | Milan, Italy |
| | Bierhoff 74' | Report | Wise 77' | Stadium: San Siro; Attendance: 74,855; Referee: (Russia) Nikolay Levnikov |

| 4 November 1999 6 | Chelsea (England) | 2–0 | (Germany) Hertha Berlin | London, England |
| | Deschamps 11'; Ferrer 44' | Report | | Stadium: Stamford Bridge; Attendance: 33,623; Referee: (Sweden) Karl-Erik Nilsson |

==== Second group stage ====
| 24 November 1999 1 | Chelsea (England) | 3–1 | (Netherlands) Feyenoord | London, England |
| | Babayaro 45'; Flo 67', 85' | Report | Cruz 90' | Stadium: Stamford Bridge; Attendance: 29,704; Referee: (Spain) Jose Garcia Aranda |

| 7 December 1999 2 | Lazio (Italy) | 0–0 | (England) Chelsea | Rome, Italy |
| | | Report | | Stadium: Stadio Olimpico; Attendance: 38,662; Referee: (Germany) Hellmut Krug |

| 29 February 2000 3 | Olympique de Marseille (France) | 1–0 | (England) Chelsea | Marseille, France |
| | Pires 16' | Report | | Stadium: Stade Vélodrome; Attendance: 24,700; Referee: (Norway) Rune Pedersen |

| 8 March 2000 4 | Chelsea (England) | 1–0 | (France) Olympique de Marseille | London, England |
| | Wise 27' | Report | | Stadium: Stamford Bridge; Attendance: 33,206; Referee: (Spain) Juan Fernandez Marin |

| 14 March 2000 5 | Feyenoord (Netherlands) | 1–3 | (England) Chelsea | Feyenoord, Netherlands |
| | Kalou 59' | Report | Zola 39'; Wise 64'; Flo 69' | Stadium: De Kuip; Attendance: 44,000; Referee: (Denmark) Knut-Erik Fisker |

| 22 March 2000 6 | Chelsea (England) | 1–2 | (Italy) Lazio | London, England |
| | Poyet 44' | Report | S. Inzaghi 54'; Mihajlović 66' | Stadium: Stamford Bridge; Attendance: 34,260; Referee: (Portugal) Vitor Manuel Melo Pereira |

==== Quarter-finals ====
| 5 April 2000 First leg | Chelsea (England) | 3–1 | (Spain) Barcelona | London, England |
| | Zola 30'; Flo 34', 38' | Report | Figo 64' | Stadium: Stamford Bridge; Attendance: 34,000; Referee: (Germany) Markus Merk |

| 18 April 2000 Second leg | Barcelona (Spain) | 5–1 (a.e.t.) | (England) Chelsea | Barcelona, Spain |
| | Rivaldo 24', 98' (pen.); Figo 45'; Dani 83'; Kluivert 104' | Report | Flo 60' | Stadium: Nou Camp; Attendance: 80,000; Referee: (Sweden) Anders Frisk |

=== Football League Cup ===
| Date | Round | Opponent | Venue | Result | Attendance | Scorers |
|---|---|---|---|---|---|---|
| 13 October 1999 | R3 | Huddersfield Town | H | 0–1 | 21,008 | |

=== FA Cup ===
| Date | Round | Opponent | Venue | Result | Attendance | Scorers |
|---|---|---|---|---|---|---|
| 11 December 1999 | R3 | Hull City | A | 6–1 | 10,279 | Poyet (3), Sutton, Di Matteo, Wise |
| 19 January 2000 | R4 | Nottingham Forest | H | 2–0 | 30,125 | Leboeuf, Wise |
| 30 January 2000 | R5 | Leicester City | H | 2–1 | 30,141 | Poyet, Weah |
| 20 February 2000 | QF | Gillingham | H | 5–0 | 34,205 | Flo, Terry, Weah, Zola (pen.), Morris |
| 9 April 2000 | SF | Newcastle United | N | 2–1 | 73,876 | Poyet (2) |
| 20 May 2000 | F | Aston Villa | N | 1–0 | 78,217 | Di Matteo |

== First team squad ==
Squad at end of season

Note: Flags indicate national team as defined under FIFA eligibility rules; some limited exceptions apply. Players may hold more than one non-FIFA nationality.

| No. | Pos. | Nation | Player |
|---|---|---|---|
| 1 | GK | NED | Ed de Goey |
| 2 | DF | ROU | Dan Petrescu |
| 3 | DF | NGR | Celestine Babayaro |
| 4 | DF | DEN | Jes Høgh |
| 5 | DF | FRA | Frank Leboeuf |
| 6 | DF | FRA | Marcel Desailly |
| 7 | MF | FRA | Didier Deschamps |
| 8 | MF | URU | Gus Poyet |
| 9 | FW | ENG | Chris Sutton |
| 11 | MF | ENG | Dennis Wise (captain) |
| 13 | GK | ENG | Kevin Hitchcock |
| 14 | DF | ENG | Graeme Le Saux |
| 15 | DF | NED | Mario Melchiot |
| 16 | MF | ITA | Roberto Di Matteo |
| 17 | DF | ESP | Albert Ferrer |
| 18 | MF | ITA | Gabriele Ambrosetti |

| No. | Pos. | Nation | Player |
|---|---|---|---|
| 19 | FW | NOR | Tore Andre Flo |
| 20 | MF | ENG | Jody Morris |
| 21 | DF | FRA | Bernard Lambourde |
| 22 | FW | ENG | Mark Nicholls |
| 24 | MF | ITA | Samuele Dalla Bona |
| 25 | FW | ITA | Gianfranco Zola |
| 26 | DF | ENG | John Terry |
| 28 | MF | ENG | Rob Wolleaston |
| 29 | DF | ENG | Neil Clement |
| 30 | DF | BRA | Emerson Thome |
| 31 | FW | LBR | George Weah (on loan from Milan) |
| 32 | FW | FIN | Mikael Forssell |
| 33 | DF | ITA | Luca Percassi |
| 34 | DF | ENG | Jon Harley |
| 36 | FW | ENG | Leon Knight |

=== Left club during season ===
Note: Flags indicate national team as defined under FIFA eligibility rules; some limited exceptions apply. Players may hold more than one non-FIFA nationality.

| No. | Pos. | Nation | Player |
|---|---|---|---|
| 12 | MF | DEN | Bjarne Goldbæk (to Fulham) |

== Statistics ==
| No. | Pos | Nat | Player | Total | | Premier League | | UEFA Champions League | | FA Cup | | League Cup | |
| No. | Pos | Nat | Player | Apps | Goals | Apps | Goals | Apps | Goals | Apps | Goals | Apps | Goals |
|---|---|---|---|---|---|---|---|---|---|---|---|---|---|
| 1 | GK | (Netherlands) NED | Ed de Goey | 59 | 0 | 37 | 0 | 16 | 0 | 6 | 0 | 0 | 0 |
| 2 | DF | (Romania) ROU | Dan Petrescu | 47 | 5 | 24+5 | 4 | 13+2 | 1 | 2+1 | 0 | 0 | 0 |
| 3 | DF | (Nigeria) NGR | Celestine Babayaro | 41 | 2 | 23+2 | 0 | 14+1 | 2 | 1 | 0 | 0 | 0 |
| 4 | DF | (Denmark) DEN | Jes Høgh | 17 | 0 | 6+3 | 0 | 2+3 | 0 | 2 | 0 | 1 | 0 |
| 5 | DF | (France) FRA | Frank Leboeuf | 46 | 4 | 28 | 2 | 13+1 | 1 | 4 | 1 | 0 | 0 |
| 6 | DF | (France) FRA | Marcel Desailly | 43 | 1 | 23 | 1 | 16 | 0 | 4 | 0 | 0 | 0 |
| 7 | MF | (France) FRA | Didier Deschamps | 47 | 1 | 24+3 | 0 | 14 | 1 | 6 | 0 | 0 | 0 |
| 8 | MF | (Uruguay) URU | Gus Poyet | 53 | 18 | 25+8 | 10 | 11+3 | 2 | 6 | 6 | 0 | 0 |
| 9 | FW | (England) ENG | Chris Sutton | 39 | 3 | 21+7 | 1 | 3+4 | 1 | 3+1 | 1 | 0 | 0 |
| 11 | MF | (England) ENG | Dennis Wise | 50 | 9 | 29+1 | 4 | 14+1 | 4 | 5 | 1 | 0 | 0 |
| 12 | MF | (Denmark) DEN | Bjarne Goldbæk | 9 | 0 | 2+4 | 0 | 1+1 | 0 | 0 | 0 | 1 | 0 |
| 14 | DF | (England) ENG | Graeme Le Saux | 13 | 0 | 6+2 | 0 | 3+1 | 0 | 0 | 0 | 1 | 0 |
| 15 | DF | (Netherlands) NED | Mario Melchiot | 6 | 0 | 4+1 | 0 | 0 | 0 | 1 | 0 | 0 | 0 |
| 16 | MF | (Italy) ITA | Roberto Di Matteo | 31 | 4 | 14+4 | 2 | 3+6 | 0 | 3 | 2 | 1 | 0 |
| 17 | DF | (Spain) ESP | Albert Ferrer | 41 | 1 | 24+1 | 0 | 14 | 1 | 2 | 0 | 0 | 0 |
| 18 | MF | (Italy) ITA | Gabriele Ambrosetti | 23 | 1 | 9+7 | 0 | 1+4 | 1 | 0+1 | 0 | 1 | 0 |
| 19 | FW | (Norway) NOR | Tore André Flo | 57 | 19 | 20+14 | 10 | 14+2 | 8 | 2+4 | 1 | 1 | 0 |
| 20 | MF | (England) ENG | Jody Morris | 46 | 4 | 19+11 | 3 | 6+5 | 0 | 1+3 | 1 | 1 | 0 |
| 21 | DF | (France) FRA | Bernard Lambourde | 21 | 2 | 12+3 | 2 | 0+2 | 0 | 3 | 0 | 1 | 0 |
| 22 | FW | (England) ENG | Mark Nicholls | 2 | 0 | 0 | 0 | 0+1 | 0 | 0 | 0 | 0+1 | 0 |
| 24 | MF | (Italy) ITA | Samuele Dalla Bona | 3 | 0 | 0+2 | 0 | 0+1 | 0 | 0 | 0 | 0 | 0 |
| 25 | FW | (Italy) ITA | Gianfranco Zola | 53 | 8 | 25+8 | 4 | 15 | 3 | 4+1 | 1 | 0 | 0 |
| 26 | DF | (England) ENG | John Terry | 9 | 1 | 2+2 | 0 | 0 | 0 | 2+2 | 1 | 1 | 0 |
| 28 | MF | (England) ENG | Rob Wolleaston | 2 | 0 | 0+1 | 0 | 0 | 0 | 0 | 0 | 0+1 | 0 |
| 29 | DF | (England) ENG | Neil Clement | 1 | 0 | 0 | 0 | 0 | 0 | 1 | 0 | 0 | 0 |
| 30 | DF | (Brazil) BRA | Emerson Thome | 21 | 0 | 18+2 | 0 | 1 | 0 | 0 | 0 | 0 | 0 |
| 31 | FW | (Liberia) LBR | George Weah | 15 | 5 | 9+2 | 3 | 0 | 0 | 4 | 2 | 0 | 0 |
| 32 | FW | (Finland) FIN | Mikael Forssell | 2 | 0 | 0 | 0 | 1 | 0 | 0 | 0 | 1 | 0 |
| 33 | DF | (Italy) ITA | Luca Percassi | 1 | 0 | 0 | 0 | 0 | 0 | 0+1 | 0 | 0 | 0 |
| 34 | DF | (England) ENG | Jon Harley | 26 | 2 | 13+4 | 2 | 1+3 | 0 | 5 | 0 | 0 | 0 |

Statistics taken from. Squad details and shirt numbers from and.

== Transfers ==
=== In ===
- (France) Didier Deschamps – (Italy) Juventus, 13 June, £3,000,000
- (Netherlands) Mario Melchiot – (Netherlands) Ajax, 14 June, free
- (England) Chris Sutton – (England) Blackburn Rovers, 5 July, £10,000,000
- (Denmark) Jes Høgh – (Turkey) Fenerbahçe, 8 July, £300,000
- (Italy) Gabriele Ambrosetti – (Italy) Vicenza, 13 August, £3,500,000
- (England) Stuart Reddington - (England) Lincoln United, 26 August, £75,000
- (Brazil) Emerson Thome – (England) Sheffield Wednesday, 23 December, £2,500,000
- (Liberia) George Weah – (Italy) Milan 11 January, Loan

=== Out ===
- (Denmark) Brian Laudrup - (Netherlands) Ajax, 14 June, £2,000,000
- (Russia) Dmitri Kharine – (Scotland) Celtic, 22 June, free
- (England) Eddie Newton – (England) Birmingham City, 2 July, free
- (England) Andy Myers – (England) Bradford City, 8 July, £800,000
- (England) Michael Duberry – (England) Leeds United, 9 July, £4,500,000
- (Scotland) Steve Hampshire - (Scotland) Dunfermline Athletic, 7 January, free
- (Denmark) Bjarne Goldbæk – (England) Fulham, 15 January, £650,000
- (England) Joe Sheerin - (England) AFC Bournemouth, 26 February, free
- (England) Paul Hughes - (England) Southampton, 23 March, free
