= Jay Richardson =

Jay Richardson may refer to:

- Jay Richardson (American football), American football linebacker
- Jay Richardson (footballer), English footballer
- Jay Richardson (politician), member of the Arkansas House of Representatives
- Julius N. Richardson, American judge and lawyer
- The Big Bopper, American musician and disc jockey
