= John Terry =

English footballer (born 1980)

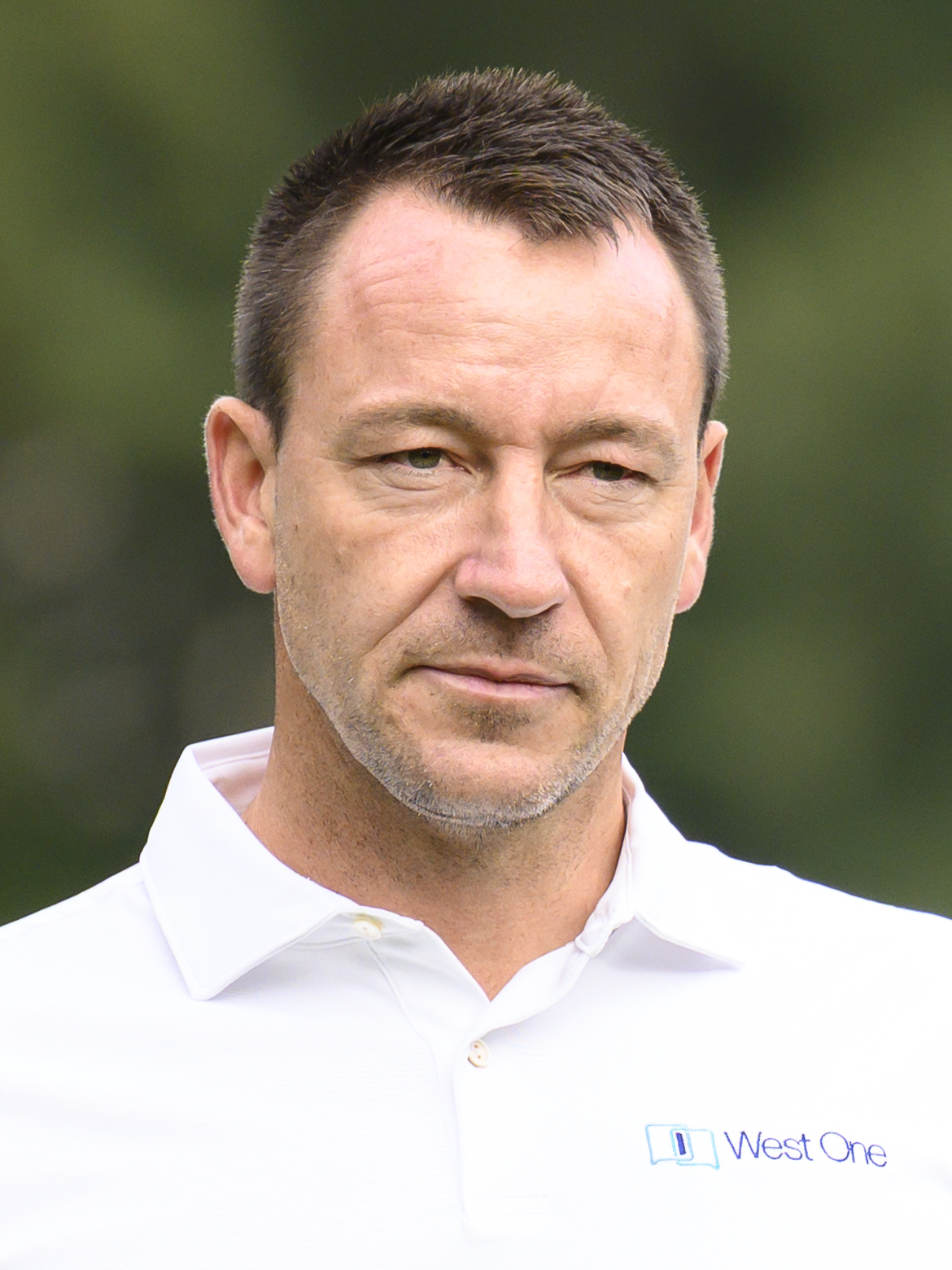
- Terry in 2023

Personal information
- Full name: John George Terry
- Date of birth: 7 December 1980 (age 45)
- Place of birth: Barking, Greater London, England
- Height: 6 ft 2 in (1.87 m)
- Position: Centre-back

Youth career
- 1991–1995: West Ham United
- 1995–1998: Chelsea

Senior career*
Years	Team	Apps	(Gls)
1998–2017	Chelsea	492	(41)
2000	→ Nottingham Forest (loan)	6	(0)
2017–2018	Aston Villa	32	(1)
Total		530	(42)

International career
2000–2002	England U21	9	(1)
2003–2012	England	78	(6)
- * Club domestic league appearances and goals

John George Terry (born 7 December 1980) is an English professional football coach and former player who played as a centre-back. He was previously captain of Chelsea, the England national team and Aston Villa. He is regarded as one of the greatest defenders of his generation, as well as one of the best English and Premier League defenders ever.

Terry was named UEFA Club Defender of the Year in 2005, 2008 and 2009, PFA Players' Player of the Year in 2005, and was included in the FIFPro World XI for five consecutive seasons, from 2005 to 2009. He was also named in the all-star squad for the 2006 FIFA World Cup, the only English player to make the team. In 2024, Terry was inducted into the Premier League Hall of Fame.

Terry is Chelsea’s most decorated captain in terms of trophies won. During his 19 years with the club, he led them to five Premier League titles, five FA Cups, three League Cups, one UEFA Europa League and one UEFA Champions League title. He is one of six players to have made over 500 appearances for Chelsea and is also the club's all-time highest scoring defender. In 2007, he became the first captain to lift the FA Cup at the new Wembley Stadium in Chelsea's 1–0 win over Manchester United, and also the first player to score an international goal there, scoring a header in England's 1–1 draw with Brazil. In his final season at Chelsea in 2017, he became the first ever player to captain a team to the Premier League title on five occasions.

Following his departure from Chelsea, Terry spent one season with Aston Villa in the Championship before retiring, ultimately losing the 2018 Championship play-off final. He returned to Aston Villa a few months later as assistant manager to Dean Smith. The side went on to win the 2019 Championship play-off final to be promoted back to the Premier League. Terry left the role in July 2021. When Smith joined Leicester City as manager in April 2023, he appointed Terry to his coaching staff once again.

== Early life ==
John George Terry was born on 7 December 1980 in Barking, Greater London. He attended Eastbury Comprehensive School and played for local Sunday league team Senrab.

== Club career ==
=== Chelsea ===
==== 1991–1998: Early years ====
As a boy, Terry was part of West Ham United's youth system, joining them as a midfielder in 1991. He moved to Chelsea at 14, playing for the club's youth and reserve teams. It was due to a shortage of central defenders that he was moved to centre-back, the position he played throughout his career. After finishing school, he joined the club on a YTS at age 16 and signed professional terms a year later.

==== 1998–2000: First appearances ====
Terry made his Chelsea debut on 28 October 1998 as a late substitute in a League Cup tie with Aston Villa; his first start came later that season in an FA Cup third-round match, a 2–0 win over Oldham Athletic.

==== 2000: Loan to Nottingham Forest ====
Terry spent a brief period on loan with Nottingham Forest in 2000 to build up his first-team experience and was the subject of interest from both Forest manager David Platt and Huddersfield Town manager Steve Bruce.

==== 2000–2002: First-team breakthrough ====
In 2002, Terry was involved in an altercation with a bouncer at a West London nightclub with Chelsea teammate Jody Morris and Wimbledon's Des Byrne, which led to him being charged with assault and affray. In August 2002, Terry was acquitted of the charges in court. During the affair, he was given a temporary ban from the English national team by The Football Association. Previously, along with Chelsea teammates Frank Lampard, Jody Morris, Eiður Guðjohnsen and former teammate Frank Sinclair, in September 2001 Terry was fined two weeks wages by Chelsea after drunkenly harassing grieving American tourists in the immediate aftermath of the September 11 attacks. During his early days at Chelsea, Terry shared a flat with Andrew Crofts.

Terry began to establish himself in the Chelsea first team from the 2000–01 season, making 23 starts and was voted the club's Player of the Year. He continued his progress during 2001–02, becoming a regular in the defence alongside club captain and France international Marcel Desailly. On 5 December 2001, he captained Chelsea for the first time, in a Premier League match against Charlton Athletic. Chelsea reached the FA Cup final, following wins against London rivals West Ham United and Tottenham Hotspur in the fourth and six rounds respectively, and Fulham in the semi-final – where Terry scored the only goal in a 1–0 victory. A virus denied Terry a place in the starting line-up for the final, although he came on as a second-half substitute while Chelsea lost 2–0 to Arsenal. In 2003–04 season, his performances led to him becoming vice-captain by manager Claudio Ranieri when Desailly was out of the team. He played well in the absence of the French international, forming a strong defensive partnership with William Gallas.

==== 2003–2008: Captaincy and successes ====
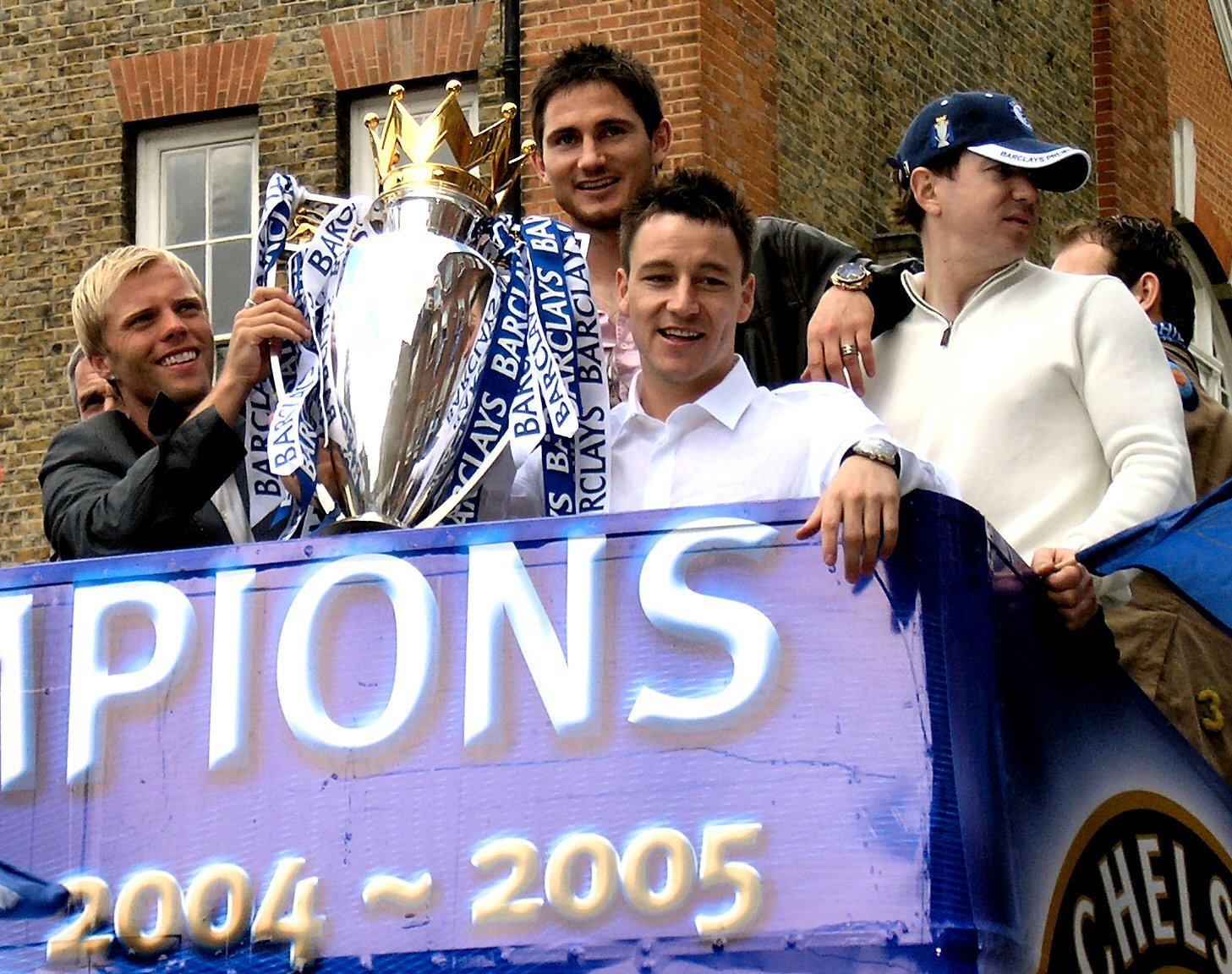
Terry (right of trophy) celebrating winning the 2004–05 Premier League with Chelsea

Following Desailly's departure, new Chelsea manager José Mourinho chose Terry as his club captain, a choice which was vindicated throughout the 2004–05 season as Chelsea won the Premier League title in record-breaking fashion with the best defensive record in Football League history with the most clean sheets and the most points accrued. He was voted Player of the Year by his fellow professionals in England and scored eight goals, including a late winner against Barcelona, in the UEFA Champions League. He was voted the best defender in the Champions League for the season. In September 2005, he was selected as a member of the World XI at the FIFPro awards. The team was chosen by a vote of professional footballers based in 40 countries.

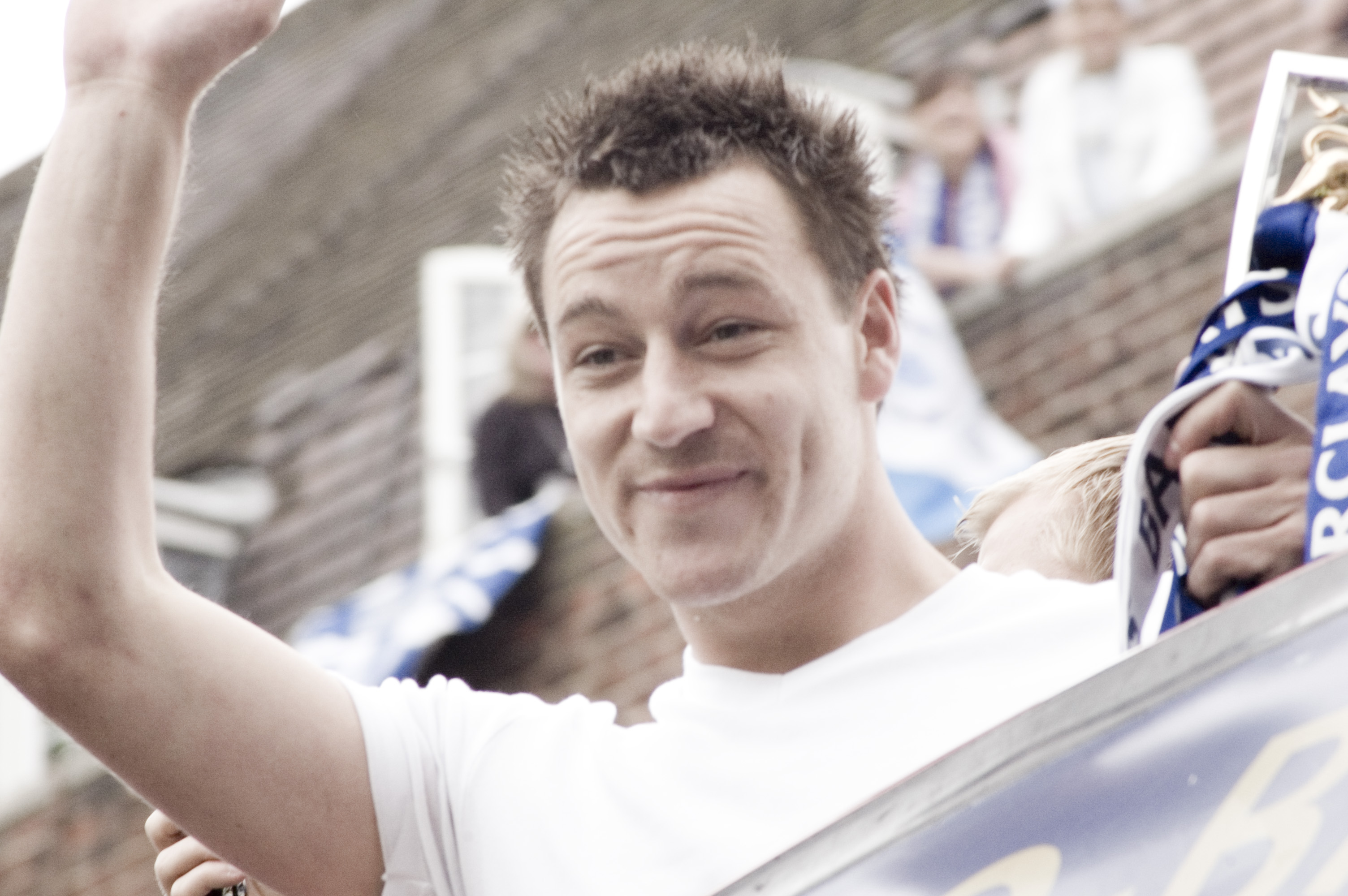
Terry celebrating after Chelsea won the 2005–06 Premier League

Chelsea defended their Premier League title in 2005–06, earning 91 points, and confirming the title with a 3–0 victory against Manchester United.

In a match on 14 October 2006 against Reading, Terry had to take over in goal for Chelsea in the final minutes of the match after goalkeepers Petr Čech and Carlo Cudicini were injured and Chelsea had no substitutes remaining. Chelsea maintained a clean sheet and secured a 1–0 victory. On 5 November 2006, playing against Tottenham Hotspur, Terry was sent off for the first time in his Chelsea career after receiving two yellow cards as the Blues lost at White Hart Lane for the first time since 1987. Terry was charged with misconduct by the FA for questioning the integrity of match referee Graham Poll after the match. On 10 January 2007, Terry was ordered to pay £10,000 for the inappropriate conduct after he changed his mind and pleaded guilty to the FA.

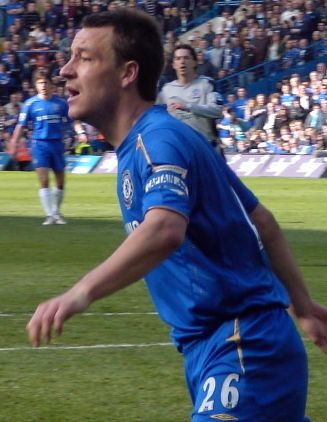
Terry playing for Chelsea in 2006

In the 2006–07 season, Terry missed matches for Chelsea due to a recurring back problem. On 26 December 2006, Mourinho stated that his captain might require surgery to fix the problem. In Terry's absence Chelsea drew 2–2 at home to both Reading and Fulham over Christmas, draws that were to prove crucial in the destiny of the Premier League title for that season. On 28 December, Chelsea released a press statement saying Terry had had back surgery: "The operation to remove a sequestrated lumbar intervertebral disc was successful." Although he was expected to return in the match against Wigan Athletic, which Chelsea won 3–2 thanks to a late goal from winger Arjen Robben, Terry was missing once again, due to the recurring back problem. He made his return in Chelsea's 1–0 victory over Charlton Athletic on 3 February 2007 coming on in the 88th minute for Claude Makelele. Terry played his first 90 minutes of football for nearly three months in Chelsea's 3–0 victory over Middlesbrough and received much applause from the Chelsea faithful. Didier Drogba scored two goals for Chelsea in that match, while the other goal came courtesy of an own goal from Abel Xavier of Middlesbrough.

Playing in the UEFA Champions League round of 16 away against Porto, he suffered another injury, this time to his ankle, and was set to miss the 2007 League Cup final against Arsenal, but managed to recover from the injury within days and played in the final. During the second half of the match, at an attacking corner, he threw himself at the ball with a diving header; Arsenal's Abou Diaby, in an attempt to clear the ball, kicked Terry in the face. Terry was unconscious for several minutes, at which point he nearly swallowed his tongue. He was carried off the field on a stretcher and immediately transferred to the University Hospital of Wales. Terry discharged himself the same day and returned to the Millennium Stadium to celebrate his team's 2–1 win. The only recollection he had of the second half is walking out onto the pitch and he did not remember the ten minutes he played prior to his injury. He went on to lead Chelsea to the semi-final of the UEFA Champions League, the third time in four years that Chelsea had made it to the final four of the competition. In May 2007, Terry captained Chelsea in the 2007 FA Cup final, in the first FA Cup final at the new Wembley Stadium.

Despite failing to agree terms to a new contract immediately following 2006–07, Terry stated on several occasions that he had no intention of leaving Chelsea. In late July, he signed a new five-year contract with a base salary of between £131,000 and £135,000 per week, making him the highest-paid player in the Premier League at the time.

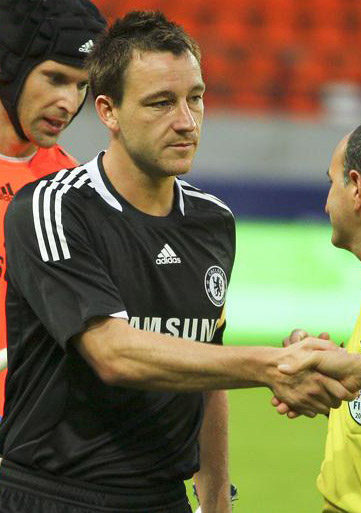
Terry playing for Chelsea in 2008

On 16 December 2007, whilst playing against Arsenal, while going to clear a ball Terry's foot was stepped on by Emmanuel Eboué and Terry had suffered 3 broken bones in his foot. He was expected to be out for at least three months but made a speedy recovery and managed to captain Chelsea to the 2008 League Cup final against Tottenham, which Chelsea lost 2–1. On 11 May 2008, whilst playing in the last league match of the season against Bolton, he collided with goalkeeper Petr Čech and suffered a partially dislocated elbow, which was eventually put back into place en route to the hospital. This injury did not prevent him playing in the 2008 UEFA Champions League final against Manchester United. The match went to penalties, and Terry missed a penalty which would have won Chelsea the match (and the Champions League). His standing leg slipped as he took his kick, and the ball missed the goal. Chelsea lost the shootout 6–5, which Terry reacted to by breaking down in tears. On 28 August 2008, Terry was awarded the Defender of The Year award from UEFA at the Champions League group stage draw in Monaco, together with Frank Lampard and Petr Čech, who received the award for their respective positions.

On 13 September 2008, Terry received the first straight red card of his career against Manchester City for rugby-tackling Jô. However, this was later rescinded on appeal. Despite being a defender, he occasionally scored important goals for Chelsea, such as in the Champions League Group A home match against Roma. However, Chelsea went on to lose the away leg 3–1.

==== 2008–2012: Double and Champions League ====
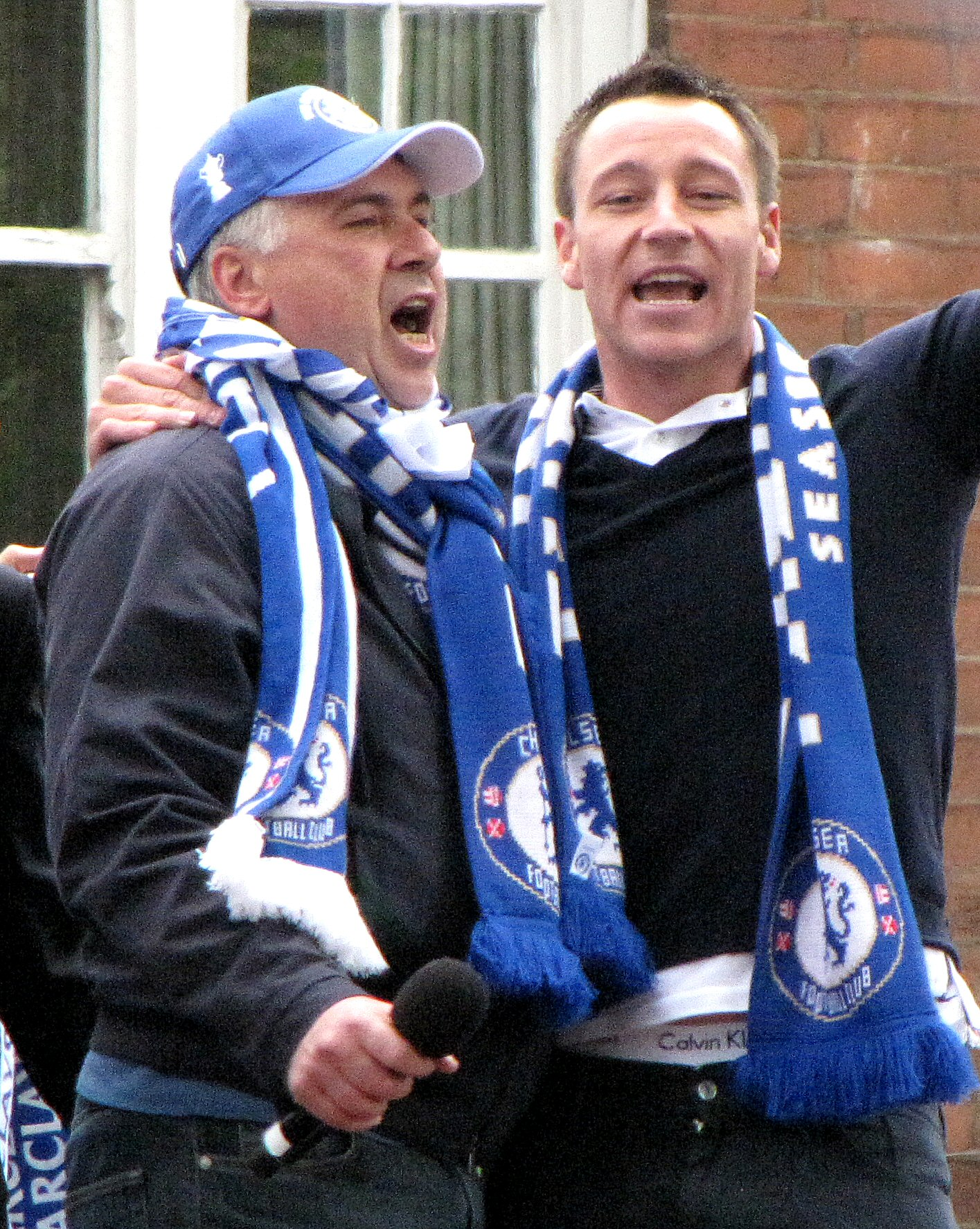
Terry (right) celebrating winning the double with Chelsea in 2010

In July 2009, Manchester City made a third bid for Terry, but Chelsea coach Carlo Ancelotti insisted Terry would remain at Chelsea. He made his debut for the new season against Premier League team Hull City, a match Chelsea won. On 8 November 2009, Terry scored the decisive goal in Chelsea's match against Manchester United at Stamford Bridge to preserve their perfect home record for the season.

On 9 May 2010, Terry captained Chelsea as they won their fourth Premier League title after an 8–0 win against Wigan Athletic at Stamford Bridge. A week later, on 15 May 2010, Terry captained Chelsea as he won his fourth FA Cup medal, defeating Portsmouth in the final by 1–0 at Wembley Stadium.

On 31 December 2011, in a home match against Aston Villa, Terry captained the Chelsea team for the 400th time of his career, a record for the club.

In 2011, Terry ranked third in pass accuracy among players who attempted over 1,000 passes, completing 91.6% of his attempts. Only Barcelona player Xavi (93.0%) and Swansea City player Leon Britton (93.3%) were better.

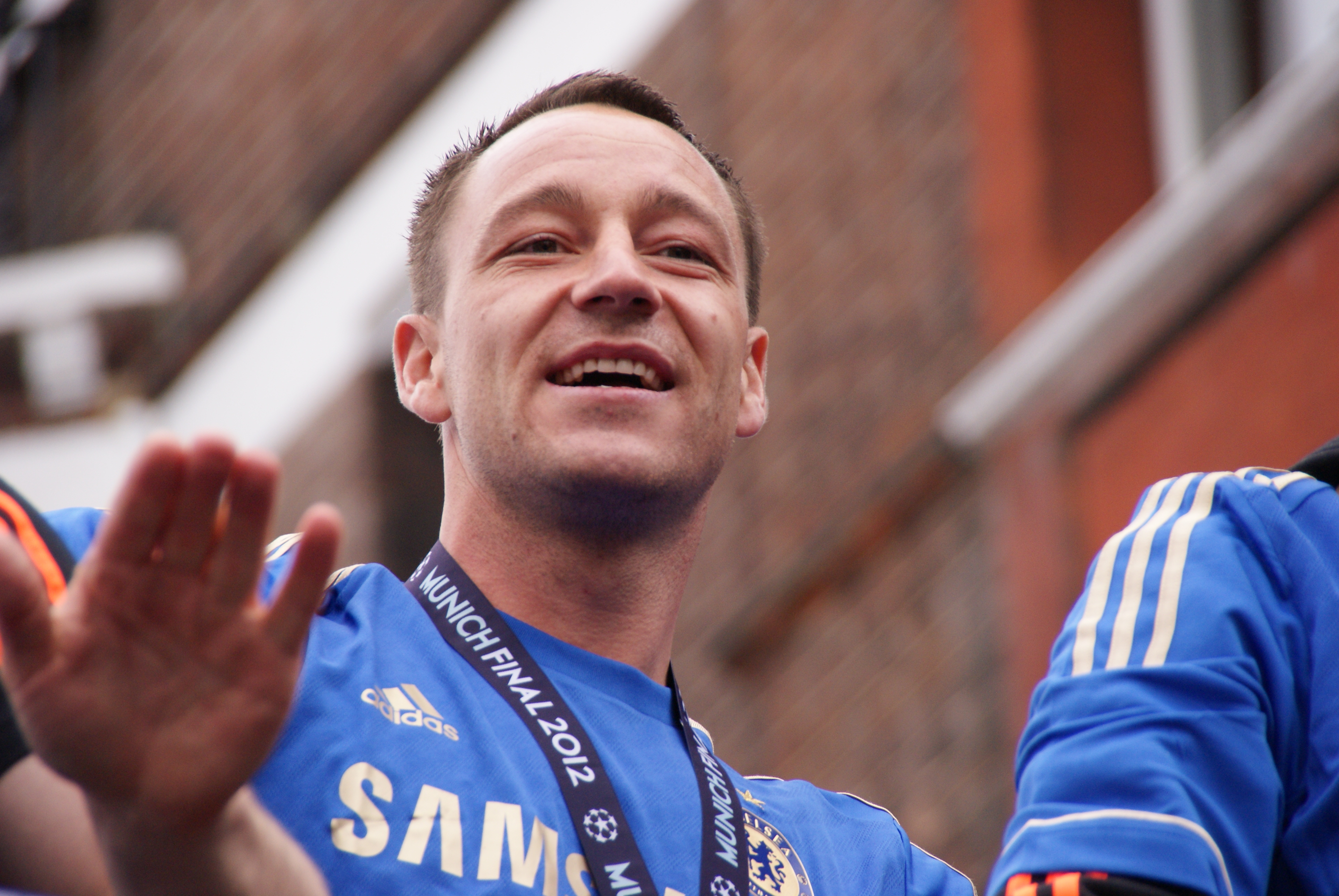
Terry celebrating Chelsea's 2011–12 UEFA Champions League triumph

On 24 April 2012, Terry was sent off for violent conduct after driving a knee into Barcelona's Alexis Sánchez in an off-the-ball incident in the 2011–12 UEFA Champions League semi-final at the Camp Nou. Chelsea's 3–2 aggregate victory over the holders qualified them for the final against Bayern Munich, for which Terry would be suspended. Terry later apologised for letting his teammates and Chelsea fans down. Terry scored his sixth league goal of the season, seventh in all competitions, in the final match of the season, a 2–1 victory over already-relegated Blackburn. The goal meant that it was Terry's most prolific season and he told the Chelsea website, "I am delighted with seven... It's always good to end a league season with a win."

Even though Terry was suspended for the Champions League final, along with teammates Ramires, Branislav Ivanović and Raul Meireles, he took part in celebrations at the final whistle after Chelsea triumphed 4–3 on penalty kicks, with striker Didier Drogba netting the decisive penalty.

==== 2012–2017: Later career ====
Queens Park Rangers defender Anton Ferdinand did not shake hands with Terry before the match against QPR. Terry was banned for four matches when he was found guilty of racially abusing Ferdinand.

On 11 November 2012, in his first match back from the four-match ban, Terry scored his 50th goal for Chelsea against Liverpool. He went off injured in the 39th minute of the same match and was suspected to have ligament damage on his right knee, but a scan the next day showed that there was "no significant damage". On 7 December 2012, new Chelsea manager Rafael Benítez confirmed Terry would not be back from injury in time to play in the 2012 FIFA Club World Cup. Terry's knee injury kept him out of action for 16 first-team matches in total, including the Club World Cup defeat. He made a 45-minute comeback for Chelsea's under-21 team on 10 January, before returning to the first team in a 2–2 draw away to Brentford in the FA Cup, that was his third match since he last played since November; 3 months prior.

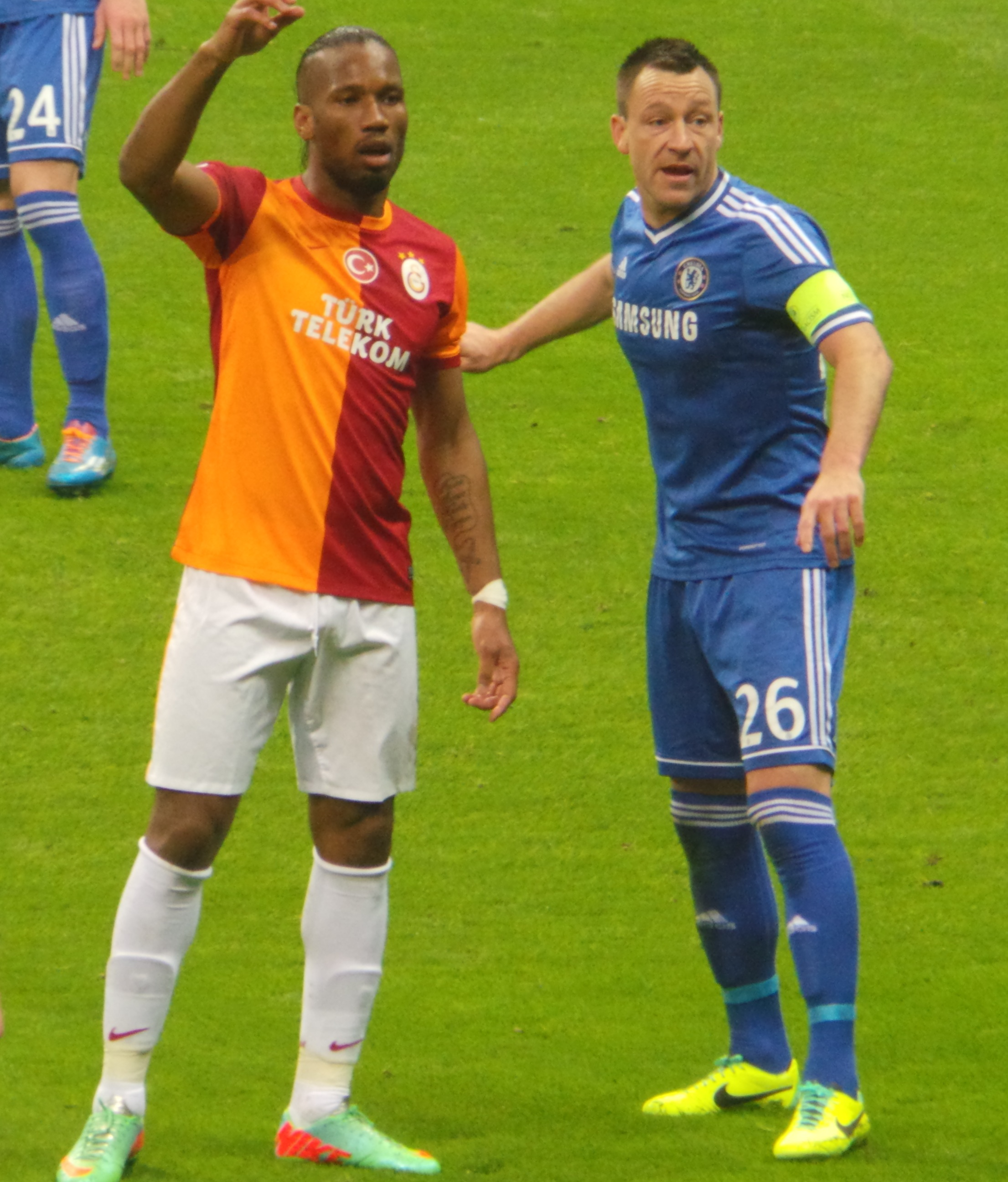
Terry (right) playing for Chelsea in 2014

On 17 April 2013, Terry scored twice in the derby match against Fulham that ended 3–0. On 13 May 2014, Terry signed a new one-year deal with the Blues.

On 18 October 2014, Terry captained Chelsea for the 500th time against Crystal Palace. In the next match, on 21 October, Terry scored in Chelsea's record Champions League win against Slovenian team Maribor. Later, he scored Chelsea's fastest-ever goal in the Champions League by heading in a goal after 90 seconds against Schalke 04.

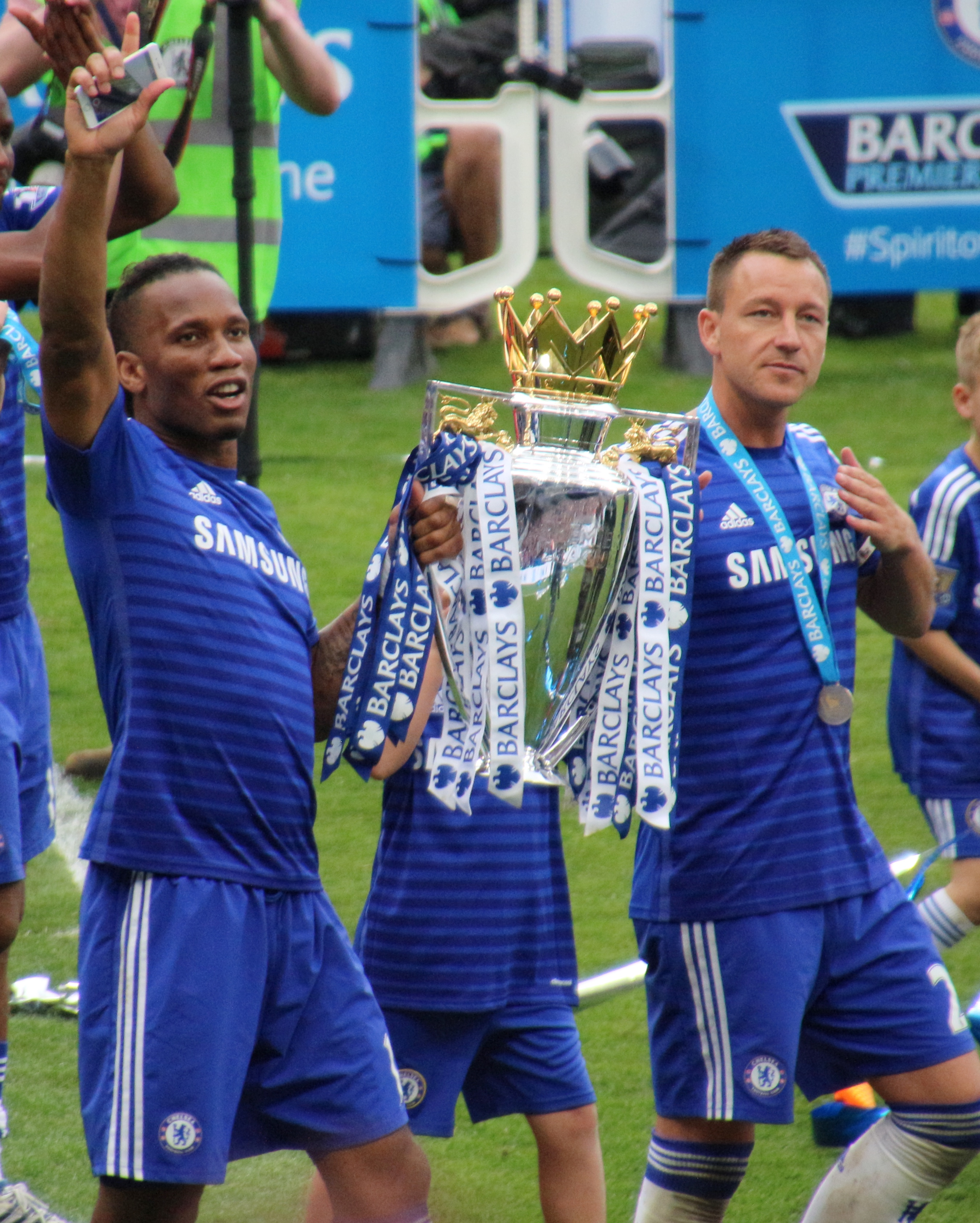
Terry (right) with the 2014–15 Premier League trophy

In the League Cup final on 1 March 2015, Terry opened the scoring and was named Man of the Match in Chelsea's 2–0 victory over Tottenham. On 26 March, Terry signed a one-year extension to his contract. On 26 April, Terry, along with five of his Chelsea teammates, was voted into the PFA Premier League Team of the Year. On 29 April, Terry became the joint highest-scoring defender in the Premier League with 38 goals, having scored the second goal in a 3–1 win over Leicester City. On 10 May, Terry surpassed David Unsworth as the highest-scoring defender in the Premier League after scoring his 39th in the opening five minutes against Liverpool, an eventual 1–1 draw.

On 23 August 2015, Terry received his first league red card for over five years, being dismissed for a foul on Salomón Rondón in a 3–2 win at West Bromwich Albion. On 15 January 2016, Terry scored an own goal in the 50th minute as well as his first goal of the season in the 98th minute, earning a 3–3 draw against Everton. On 1 February 2016, Terry announced that he would leave Chelsea in the summer of 2016, saying "It's not going to be a fairy-tale ending."

Although Terry announced in February that there were no talks held to discuss a new contract, on 18 May 2016, Terry signed a new one-year contract to remain at Chelsea until the end of the 2016–17 season. Ten days previously, Terry had been sent off in a 3–2 loss to Sunderland at the Stadium of Light in what was widely believed to have been his final appearance for the club.

During Antonio Conte's first press conference as the new Chelsea manager, Conte confirmed that Terry would remain the club captain. On 11 September 2016, during the closing minutes of the match against Swansea City, Terry suffered an ankle injury and required crutches to leave the pitch after the final whistle.

On 8 January 2017, making his first start for Chelsea since an EFL Cup defeat to West Ham United in October 2016, Terry was given a straight red card for a foul on Lee Angol as Chelsea beat Peterborough United 4–1 in the FA Cup third round. On 17 April, he announced that he would be leaving Chelsea at the end of the 2016–17 season. After Chelsea celebrated their Premier League victory, Terry played his 717th and final match for Chelsea on 21 May in a 5–1 home win over Sunderland, coming off in the 28th minute (the substitution board went up in the 26th minute, the same as that of his shirt number), and received a guard of honour from his teammates. In December 2019, Terry was voted in Chelsea's team of the decade as voted for by its fans.

=== Aston Villa ===
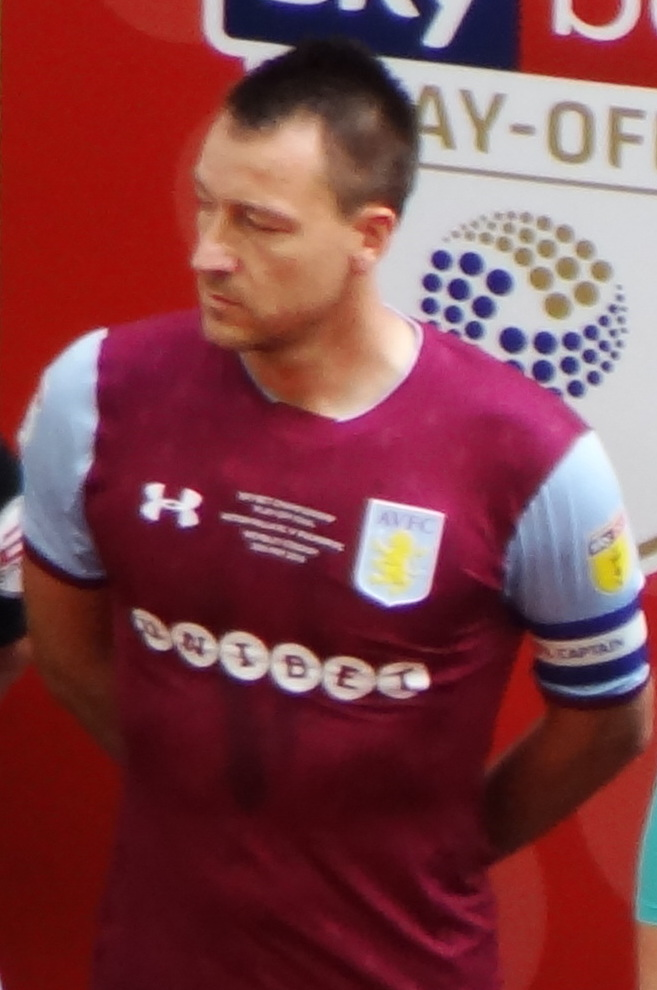
Terry lining up for Aston Villa in the 2018 Championship play-off final

On 3 July 2017, Terry signed a one-year contract with Championship club Aston Villa on a free transfer. He was appointed as the captain for the 2017–18 season. He made his debut for Aston Villa on 5 August 2017 in a 1–1 home draw with Hull City in the Championship. Terry scored his only goal for Aston Villa in a 2–1 victory over Fulham in the Championship on 21 October.

On 30 May 2018, Terry left Aston Villa after the club failed to gain promotion to the Premier League as they lost 1–0 against Fulham in the Championship play-off final.

In September 2018, Terry underwent a medical with Spartak Moscow, but declined their offer of a contract, citing family reasons. He announced his retirement from playing on 7 October.

== International career ==
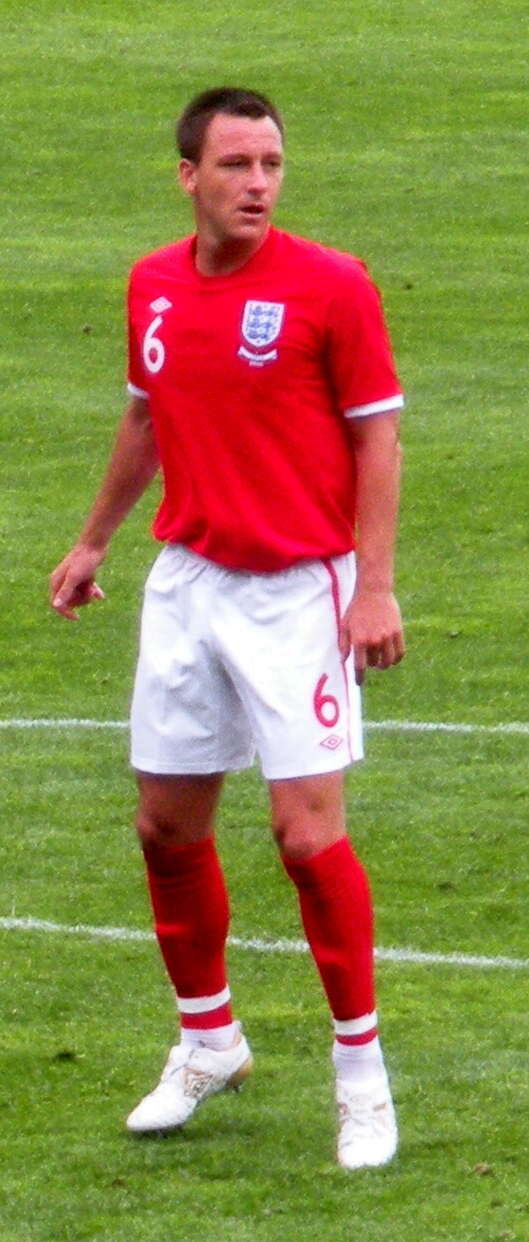
Terry playing for England in 2010

Terry made his England debut in June 2003 against Serbia and Montenegro, and started his first match for England on 20 August 2003 at Portman Road, Ipswich, in a friendly against Croatia. England won 3–1. His main central defensive partner had been Rio Ferdinand. He played for his country at Euro 2004, and England manager Sven-Göran Eriksson stated that Terry was the first-choice centre-back, ahead of Sol Campbell.

In 2005 during a FIFA World Cup qualifying match against Poland, Terry wore England's captain armband, replacing Michael Owen as captain after the latter was substituted.

He cemented his place in the England squad after being selected for the 2006 FIFA World Cup. In a warm-up match for that tournament against Hungary on 30 May 2006, Terry scored his first goal for England, the team's second in a 3–1 victory. Despite an injury scare in a friendly against Jamaica, he recovered to play in England's opening fixture against Paraguay, a 1–0 victory. In the next match against Trinidad and Tobago, Carlos Edwards beat England's Paul Robinson to a cross and as Stern John bundled a header towards the goal, Terry cleared the ball off the line with an overhead kick. In the quarter-final match against Portugal, Terry played the entire match, but England lost on penalties and he was left in tears with his fellow players. Six days later, he was the only English player to be named in the tournament's all-star squad.

On 10 August 2006, Steve McClaren named John Terry as the England captain, succeeding David Beckham. McClaren said, "Choosing a captain is one of the most important decisions a coach has to make. I'm certain I've got the right man in John Terry. I'm convinced he will prove to be one of the best captains England has ever had." Terry scored a goal on his debut as the England captain, in a friendly international against Greece. This was the first goal of the match and also the first goal during McClaren's reign as manager. However, with Terry as captain, England did not qualify for UEFA Euro 2008 – their first absence from a tournament finals since the 1994 FIFA World Cup. Midway through the qualification campaign, Terry had accepted that he would "bear full responsibility" should England fail to qualify.

On 1 June 2007, Terry became the first player in the senior England team to score an international goal at the new Wembley Stadium when he scored England's goal from a header in the box after a free kick cross by David Beckham in a 1–1 draw with Brazil. Almost a year later, he scored a similar headed goal once again from a free kick cross by David Beckham to put England 1–0 up against the United States on 28 May 2008.

Terry was confirmed as the England captain in August, and captained England in qualifying for the 2010 FIFA World Cup. During his first match after being reinstated as the permanent England captain, a friendly against Czech Republic, he was given a torrid time by Milan Baroš and was turned far too easily when Baros scored the first goal for his team. The match ended 2–2 with Joe Cole scoring a fortunate equaliser for England in the 92nd minute of the match. He scored his first competitive England goal against Ukraine on 1 April 2009, in the qualifiers for the World Cup, grabbing a late winner after earlier giving away a free kick which led to Andriy Shevchenko's equalising goal for Ukraine. England sealed their place in the final tournament in September 2009, following a 5–1 home win against Croatia.

On 5 February 2010, following allegations regarding Terry's private life, England manager Fabio Capello announced that Terry was removed as the captain of the England team. He was replaced by fellow defender Rio Ferdinand.

At the 2010 FIFA World Cup, England started with two draws against the United States and Algeria, which received heavy criticism from the English media.

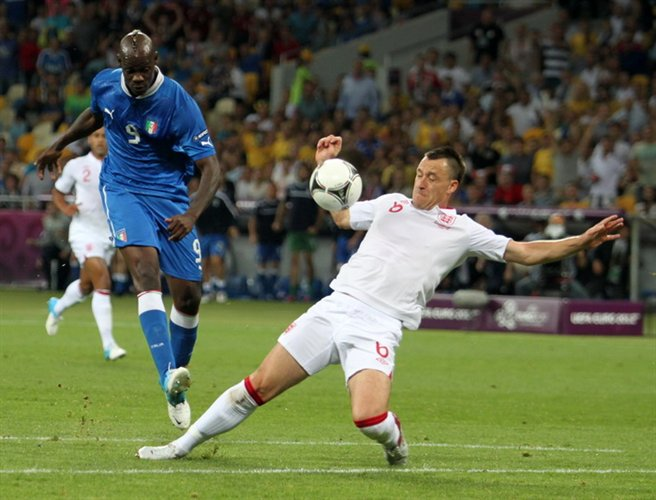
Terry (right) playing for England at UEFA Euro 2012

Two days after the Algeria match in a media interview, Terry hinted at dissatisfaction with Capello's team selection and stated that the players were bored with little to do in the evenings at their training base; he also said that a clear-the-air team meeting would take place that evening. The next day, Capello responded by saying that Terry had made "a very big mistake" in challenging his authority to the media.

On 19 March 2011, Capello reinstated Terry as England captain following a long-term injury to previous captain Rio Ferdinand. On 3 February 2012, with Terry due to stand trial due to allegations that Terry had racially abused QPR's Anton Ferdinand, the FA stripped Terry of the England captaincy for the second time. This led to Capello resigning.

Terry was named in new manager Roy Hodgson's squad for UEFA Euro 2012 while Rio Ferdinand was left out, leading to heavy speculation that this was to avoid potential conflict due to Terry's upcoming trial for racially abusing Ferdinand's brother Anton. Terry played 90 minutes in all four of England's matches at the Euros.

Terry announced on 23 September 2012 he had retired from international football.

== Style of play ==
Described by ESPN as a "commanding, no-nonsense style of player", Terry was recognized for his physicality and aggressive defending style, though some critics noted that he struggled against quicker forwards. He usually played as a centre-back, although he initially started out playing as a midfielder in his youth. A tall defender, he excelled in the air, which enabled him to defend crosses and high balls effectively, and also made him a goal threat for his team in the opposing penalty area, despite his defensive playing role. Although he was primarily known for his aggressive tackling, he was also an intelligent player, who was recognised by pundits for his positioning and anticipation, as well as his ability to read the game, which compensated for his lack of pace or athleticism, in particular in his later career; he also stood out for his leadership and bravery throughout his career, as well as his ability organise the back–line. Despite not being a particularly fast player, however, in particular over short distances, Samuel Eto'o once described Terry as being "surprisingly quick", while in his youth, a 2003 match report from an international friendly against Croatia described "speed and tackling ability" as his strengths, while instead citing his reading of the game and ability to defend set pieces in the air as areas in need of improvement. Regarded as one of the best defenders in the world at his peak, he is considered to be one of the greatest central defenders of his generation, as well as one of the best English and Premier League defenders ever.

Despite the praise he received in the media for his defensive skills, critical opinion on Terry's technical ability was frequently divided; throughout his career, he was often paired with an intelligent, more technical and more mobile ball–playing centre-back, such as Ricardo Carvalho at Chelsea or Rio Ferdinand with England, which complemented Terry's more physical playing style as a "stopper", and also provided cover for him, as his lack of pace saw him struggle at times in teams that played a high defensive line. While some pundits, such as Chris Wright of ESPN or Robin Bairner and Sulmaan Ahmad of Goal, have cited Terry's technique as a weakness, with Tom Sheen of The Independent also noting that his general reputation for lacking speed or elegance in possession and his reluctance to carry the ball out from the back saw him perceived as "a bit of a plodder when on the ball," others, such as Jamie Carragher and Jamie Redknapp, have instead argued that his ability on the ball and composure in possession was an underrated aspect of his game, which did not get as much attention as his tactical sense. During one of Terry's final matches for Chelsea, in a 2017 article for The Guardian, Barney Ronay noted that "Terry lined up at the heart of the central defensive three," and described him as: "A little heavier, clanking about like an eager old tin man, he still has an excellent touch although, had he played much deeper in the second half, he might have been best served bringing out a shovel and digging a trench in front of his own goal." In 2009, UEFA.com praised Terry for his ability to control the ball with his chest. Moreover, although Terry's passing was initially cited as being in need of improvement in his early career, his distribution throughout his career was also generally solid and reliable, which often saw him complete many passes throughout the course of a season with a high success rate, although he usually favoured making simpler short passes on the ground; Michael Cox described his distribution as "underrated" in 2015, however, while Redknapp and Carragher have both noted that Terry was also capable of playing long balls with either foot, despite being naturally right–footed, a trait which Sam Wallace and Tom Sheen of The Independent also noticed in 2011 and 2014 respectively, with the latter describing Terry as "an exceptionally two-footed footballer," who "will show off a range of passing with either foot." As Sheen notes, Terry's ability with either foot often allowed him to play as a left–sided centre-back in a four–man defensive line throughout his career. In 2011, Terry was the world's third best passer for players with over 1,000 passes, with a 91.6% pass accuracy rate. Only Barcelona player Xavi (93.0%) and Swansea City player Leon Britton (93.3%) were better. He also played in a three–man back–line on occasion, in particular in his later career under Chelsea manager Antonio Conte, although he struggled to adapt to this formation due to his lack of pace as a result of his advancing age. Terry has been involved in multiple incidents that received significant media attention, including legal disputes and on-pitch altercations.

== Coaching career ==
=== Aston Villa ===
On 10 October 2018, Terry was appointed assistant head coach of Aston Villa, with newly appointed Dean Smith as head coach. On 26 July 2021, Terry departed Aston Villa after three years at the club, in which they achieved promotion to, and consolidated their position in the Premier League. He described Dean Smith as a great influence on his coaching career. In December 2021, his return to Chelsea, commencing in January 2022 in a coaching consultancy role was announced.

=== Leicester City ===
Following the announcement of Dean Smith as the new Leicester City manager on 10 April 2023, Terry was appointed to his coaching staff once again.

=== Chelsea ===
In July 2023, Terry returned to Chelsea as the club's Academy coach.

== Sponsorship ==
On the UK version of Pro Evolution Soccer 6, Terry appears on the front cover with Brazil international Adriano.

== Family and personal life ==
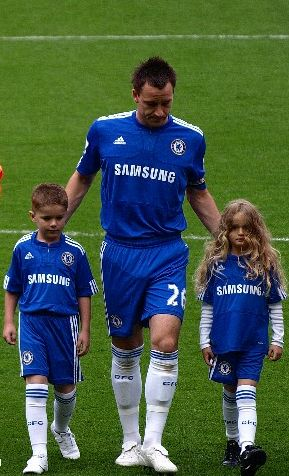
Terry with children mascots in 2009

Terry is married to his childhood sweetheart Toni (née Poole). On 18 May 2006, Terry and Toni had twins, a boy and a girl. They married at Blenheim Palace in June 2007.

Terry was a Manchester United supporter growing up. His older brother, Paul (born 1979), is a former professional footballer, having played for Dagenham & Redbridge and Yeovil Town. Terry's nephew, Frankie, is currently a professional footballer for Colchester United.

In 2016, Terry paid the £1,600 funeral costs for an eight-year-old Chelsea fan with leukaemia who died after an unsuccessful bone marrow transplantation.

Terry co-owns custom swimwear company Thomas Royall with fellow footballers Sam Saunders and Liam Ridgewell.

=== Legal issues ===
In September 2001, Terry and three teammates were fined two weeks' wages by Chelsea for an incident involving American tourists at a Heathrow airport bar in the aftermath of the September 11 attacks. In January 2002, Terry, Chelsea teammate Jody Morris and Des Byrne of Wimbledon were charged with assault and affray after a confrontation with a nightclub bouncer. Terry was banned from selection for the England team for the duration of the case, though he was ultimately cleared of all charges. In 2009, Terry was investigated by Chelsea and the FA for allegedly taking money from an undercover reporter for a private tour of Chelsea's training ground. The club responded that it was "confident that at no time did Terry ask for or accept money in relation to visits to the training ground."

==== Extramarital affair allegations ====
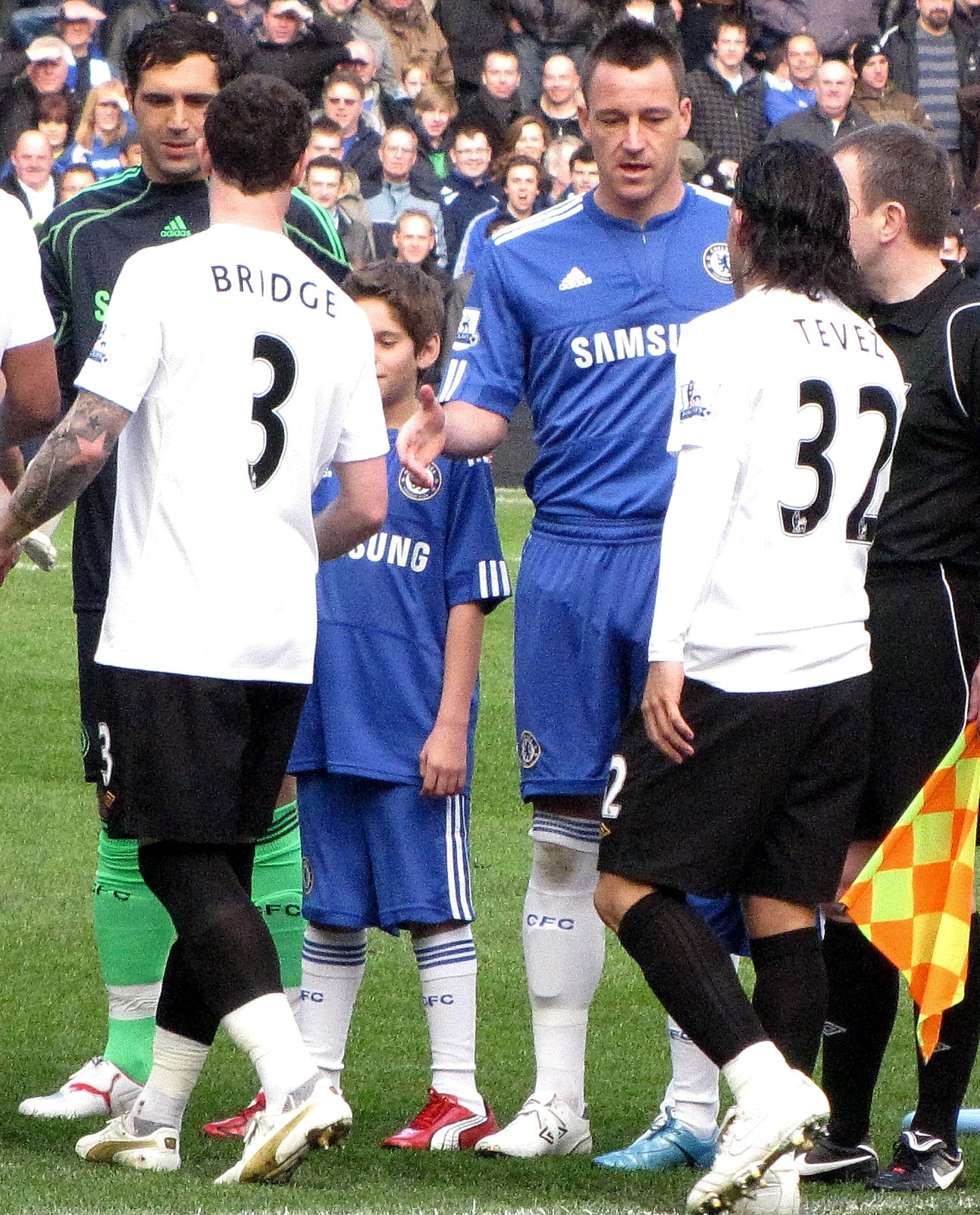
Wayne Bridge refuses to shake Terry's hand at the start of Manchester City's game against Chelsea on 27 February 2010.

In January 2010, a super-injunction was imposed by a High Court judge preventing the media from reporting allegations that Terry had had a four-month affair in late 2009 with Vanessa Perroncel, the former girlfriend of Wayne Bridge, his former Chelsea and England teammate. The injunction was lifted a week later, and the British media – especially the tabloid press – covered the rumours in great detail in the days following. The News of the World and the Mail on Sunday subsequently printed apologies to Perroncel for breaching her privacy and stated that the story was "untrue in any case". Perroncel maintains that the alleged affair never took place. The allegations led to then-England manager Fabio Capello removing Terry from the captaincy on 5 February 2010, replacing him with Rio Ferdinand. Terry was reinstated as captain the following year.

On 27 February 2010, Terry played against Bridge for the first time since the incident, where in a highly publicised incident prior to the match, Bridge refused to shake hands with Terry.

==== Racial abuse allegations ====
In November 2011, Terry was placed under police investigation following an allegation of racist abuse made at Anton Ferdinand during a match between Chelsea and Queens Park Rangers on 23 October 2011. Video footage circulated on the internet led to accusations that Terry called Ferdinand a "fucking black cunt." In response to the video footage, Terry claimed that he was actually asking Ferdinand, "Oi, Anton, do you think I called you a black cunt?" On 21 December 2011, he was charged with using racist language by the Crown Prosecution Service. In February 2012, the Football Association stripped Terry of his England captaincy for the second time, stating that Terry would not captain the national team until the racial abuse allegations against him were resolved. When the trial began in July 2012, Terry entered a not guilty plea and was acquitted of the charge on 13 July 2012.

On 27 July 2012, the FA charged Terry for using "abusive and/or insulting words and/or behaviour" which "included a reference to the ethnic origin and/or colour and/or race of Ferdinand." The FA had delayed the charge until after the conclusion of Terry's criminal trial. Terry denied the charge. On the eve of the FA's hearing, Terry announced his retirement from the national team, saying his position had become "untenable" due to the disciplinary charge. On 27 September 2012, the hearing concluded with Terry being found guilty; he was punished with a four-match ban and a £220,000 fine. In October 2012, Terry decided not to appeal against the verdict and his four-match ban and issued an apology for "the language [he] used in the game" and stated that it was "not acceptable on the football field or indeed in any walk of life."

==== India anti-smoking campaign image ====
In January 2012, an image resembling Terry appeared without authorization on cigarette packaging in India as part of a government anti-smoking campaign. The picture, which showed a blurred head-and-shoulder likeness above the words "Smoking Kills", was reported by The Indian Express to have been circulated by the Directorate of Visual Publicity. Terry’s management stated that no permission had been sought for the use of his image and announced that legal advice was being pursued. Officials in India gave conflicting explanations, with one suggesting it was an artistic creation and another acknowledging uncertainty as to how Terry’s likeness came to be used.

=== In popular culture ===
Terry has been represented in a meme which pictures him taking part in great moments in history and fiction, following his decision to come on to the pitch to lift the European Cup in full kit despite being suspended for the 2012 UEFA Champions League final; he repeated this when Chelsea won the 2013 UEFA Europa League final, in which he did not play due to injury. These included the fall of the Berlin Wall, the freeing of Nelson Mandela and the triumph of Rocky Balboa. Over the summer of 2012 this developed into his celebrating current sporting achievements such as 2012 Summer Olympics medal wins by Team GB.

=== Political views ===
Terry has expressed support on multiple occasions for the MP Rupert Lowe, of the far-right party Restore Britain, posting on social media in support of Lowe's call for a national ban on wearing of the burqa and the deportation of migrants who are unable to financially support themselves.

== Career statistics ==
=== Club ===
Appearances and goals by club, season and competition
Club	Season	League			FA Cup		League Cup		Europe		Other		Total	
Club	Season	Division	Apps	Goals	Apps	Goals	Apps	Goals	Apps	Goals	Apps	Goals	Apps	Goals
Chelsea	1998–99	Premier League	2	0	3	0	1	0	1 (Note: Appearance in UEFA Cup Winners' Cup)	0	—		7	0
Chelsea	1999–2000	Premier League	4	0	4	1	1	0	0	0	—		9	1
Chelsea	2000–01	Premier League	22	1	3	0	1	0	0	0	0	0	26	1
Chelsea	2001–02	Premier League	33	1	5	2	5	0	4 (Note: Appearance(s) in UEFA Cup)	1	—		47	4
Chelsea	2002–03	Premier League	20	3	5	2	3	0	1	1	—		29	6
Chelsea	2003–04	Premier League	33	2	3	1	2	0	13 (Note: Appearances in UEFA Champions League)	0	—		51	3
Chelsea	2004–05	Premier League	36	3	1	1	5	0	11	4	—		53	8
Chelsea	2005–06	Premier League	36	4	4	2	1	1	8	0	1 (Note: Appearance in FA Community Shield)	0	50	7
Chelsea	2006–07	Premier League	28	1	4	0	2	0	10	0	1	0	45	1
Chelsea	2007–08	Premier League	23	1	2	0	2	0	10	0	0	0	37	1
Chelsea	2008–09	Premier League	35	1	4	0	1	0	11	2	—		51	3
Chelsea	2009–10	Premier League	37	2	5	1	1	0	8	0	1	0	52	3
Chelsea	2010–11	Premier League	33	3	3	0	1	0	8	1	1	0	46	4
Chelsea	2011–12	Premier League	31	6	4	0	1	0	8	1	—		44	7
Chelsea	2012–13	Premier League	14	4	3	1	1	0	8 (Note: Two appearances in UEFA Champions League, six appearances and one goal in UEFA Europa League)	1	1	0	27	6
Chelsea	2013–14	Premier League	34	2	0	0	1	0	11	0	1 (Note: Appearance in UEFA Super Cup)	0	47	2
Chelsea	2014–15	Premier League	38	5	0	0	4	1	7	2	—		49	8
Chelsea	2015–16	Premier League	24	1	2	0	2	0	4	0	1	0	33	1
Chelsea	2016–17	Premier League	9	1	3	0	2	0	—		—		14	1
Chelsea	Total		492	41	58	11	37	2	123	13	7	0	717	67
Nottingham Forest (loan)	1999–2000	First Division	6	0	—		—		—		—		6	0
Aston Villa	2017–18	Championship	32	1	1	0	0	0	—		3 (Note: Appearances in Championship play-offs)	0	36	1
Career total			530	42	59	11	37	2	123	13	10	0	759	68

=== International ===
Appearances and goals by national team and year
National team	Year	Apps	Goals
England	2003	6	0
England	2004	9	0
England	2005	6	0
England	2006	14	2
England	2007	7	1
England	2008	6	2
England	2009	10	1
England	2010	7	0
England	2011	7	0
England	2012	6	0
Total		78	6

England score listed first, score column indicates score after each Terry goal

List of international goals scored by John Terry
No.	Date	Venue	Cap	Opponent	Score	Result	Competition	Ref.
1	30 May 2006	Old Trafford, Manchester, England	23	Hungary	2–0	3–1	Friendly	
2	16 August 2006	Old Trafford, Manchester, England	30	Greece	1–0	4–0	Friendly	
3	1 June 2007	Wembley Stadium, London, England	38	Brazil	1–0	1–1	Friendly	
4	28 May 2008	Wembley Stadium, London, England	44	United States	1–0	2–0	Friendly	
5	19 November 2008	Olympiastadion, Berlin, Germany	48	Germany	2–1	2–1	Friendly	
6	1 April 2009	Wembley Stadium, London, England	51	Ukraine	2–1	2–1	2010 FIFA World Cup qualification	

== Honours ==
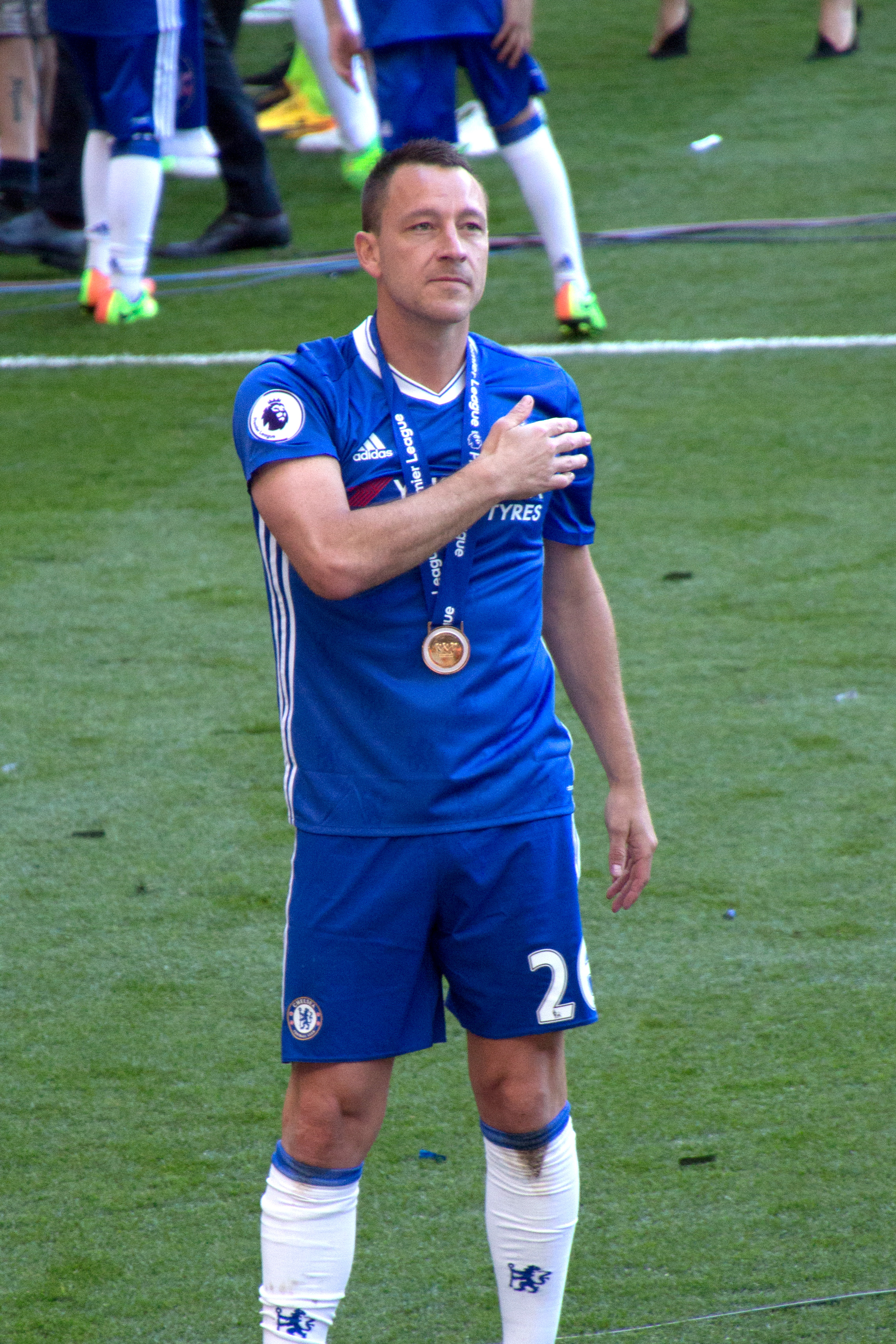
Terry after winning the 2016–17 Premier League with Chelsea

Chelsea

- Premier League: 2004–05, 2005–06, 2009–10, 2014–15, 2016–17
- FA Cup: 1999–2000, 2006–07, 2008–09, 2009–10, 2011–12; runner-up: 2001–02, 2016–17
- Football League Cup: 2004–05, 2006–07, 2014–15; runner-up: 2007–08
- FA Community Shield: 2005, 2009
- UEFA Champions League: 2011–12; runner-up: 2007–08
- UEFA Europa League: 2012–13

Individual

- Chelsea Player of the Year: 2000–01, 2005–06
- Premier League Player of the Month: January 2005
- Alan Hardaker Trophy: 2005, 2015
- PFA Players' Player of the Year: 2004–05
- PFA Team of the Year: 2003–04 Premier League, 2004–05 Premier League, 2005–06 Premier League, 2014–15 Premier League
- FIFA FIFPro World XI: 2004–05, 2005–06, 2006–07, 2007–08, 2008–09
- ESM Team of the Year: 2004–05, 2008–09, 2009–10
- UEFA Club Defender of the Year: 2005, 2008, 2009
- UEFA Team of the Year: 2005, 2007, 2008, 2009
- FIFA World Cup All-Star Team: 2006
- PFA Team of the Century (1997–2007): 2007
- Premier League Hall of Fame: 2024

== See also ==
- List of footballers with 100 or more UEFA Champions League appearances
