= Jay Richardson (footballer) =

English footballer (born 1979)

Personal information
- Full name: Jay Grant Richardson
- Date of birth: 14 November 1979 (age 46)
- Place of birth: Kenton, England
- Position: Midfielder

Senior career*
Years	Team	Apps	(Gls)
1998–2001	Chelsea	0	(0)
2001–2002	Exeter City	18	(0)
2002–2003	Enfield	?	(?)
2003–2004	Crawley Town	?	(?)
2004	Eastbourne Borough	7	(0)
2004–2005	Croydon Athletic	?	(?)
- * Club domestic league appearances and goals

Jay Grant Richardson (born 14 November 1979) is an English former professional footballer who played in the Football League as a midfielder.
