= Rob Wolleaston =

English footballer

Personal information
- Full name: Robert Ainsley Wolleaston
- Date of birth: 21 December 1979 (age 46)
- Place of birth: Perivale, London, England
- Position: Midfielder

Youth career
- Chelsea

Senior career*
Years	Team	Apps	(Gls)
1998–2003	Chelsea	1	(0)
2000	→ Bristol Rovers (loan)	4	(0)
2000	→ Nottingham Forest (loan)	0	(0)
2001	→ Portsmouth (loan)	6	(0)
2001	→ Northampton Town (loan)	7	(0)
2003–2004	Bradford City	14	(1)
2004–2005	Oxford United	20	(0)
2006–2008	Cambridge United	92	(9)
2008–2010	Rushden & Diamonds	57	(9)
2010	Farnborough	3	(0)
2010–2011	Weymouth	35	(6)
2011–2014	Harrow Borough	98	(5)
Total		337	(30)
- * Club domestic league appearances and goals

Robert Ainsley Wolleaston (born 21 December 1979) is an English retired footballer who last played for Harrow Borough. He is a midfielder.

Wolleaston started his career with Chelsea, but he only made two first-team appearances in five years, and instead had short loan spells with Bristol Rovers, Nottingham Forest, Portsmouth and Northampton Town. Following his release from Chelsea, he moved to Bradford City, but was released after one season, in which the club suffered relegation and administration. He spent more than a season with Oxford United but left following a series of injuries and instead dropped into non-league with Cambridge United, for whom he played 92 league games in three seasons, until he moved to Rushden & Diamonds in 2008. He played another 57 games at Rushden, and went on to have a short spell with Farnborough before moving to Weymouth.

== Career ==
=== Chelsea ===
Born in Perivale, London, Wolleaston started his career at Chelsea. He made his Chelsea debut in a League Cup tie against Huddersfield Town and played his second game in the Premier League as a late substitute against Sunderland, both in 1999. In March 2000, he was sent on loan to Bristol Rovers, playing four games, but failed to score or help Rovers to a victory.

In August 2000, he was due to go on loan to West Bromwich Albion but instead opted to join Nottingham Forest on a similar deal for one month. Forest had an option to extend the loan spell for the season, but Wolleaston never appeared for the club. Instead in March 2001, Wolleaston was given another loan spell, this time with First Division Portsmouth, for the rest of the 2000–01 season. He made his debut three days later when Portsmouth defeated Stockport County 2–1, when Wolleaston hit the crossbar and was later replaced by match winner Steve Lovell. Wolleaston played a total of six games for Portsmouth, once as substitute, but failed to score.

Wolleaston returned to Chelsea but again left on a loan deal ahead of the 2001–02 season, joining Second Division-side Northampton Town with fellow Chelsea youngster Sam Parkin. Wolleaston's debut for Northampton came on 18 August 2001 as they lost 2–0 to Stoke City, going on to make eight appearances in three months for the club, seven in the league, again without scoring a goal. He returned to Chelsea but never appeared in another first-team appearance in another two seasons.

=== Bradford City ===
Wolleaston played two reserve games for Bradford City at the end of the 2002–03 season, and in June 2003 signed a one-year deal with the First Division-side. He made his debut for Bradford in a League Cup tie with Darlington, which City lost 5–3 on penalties after the game had finished 0–0. His first league game came just over a week later as Bradford lost 1–0 to Gillingham. Bradford struggled for form and Wolleaston's first goal did not come until April when he gave the team hope in a crucial game against Derby County. However, Derby went on to win the game 3–2, which effectively ended City's hopes of avoiding relegation. City's relegation was followed by a fall into administration, and Wolleaston, along with Michael Branch and Mark Paston, was released from the club at the end of the season. He had played 15 games for Bradford, all but one of which was in the league, with his goal against Derby being the only time he scored.

=== Oxford United ===
He soon signed for League Two's Oxford United, who were managed by his former coach at Chelsea and Portsmouth, Graham Rix. Wolleaston made his debut for Oxford on the opening day of the 2004–05 as their new look side lost 1–0 to Boston United. He played 22 games during his first season with Oxford, with one each coming in the League Cup and Football League Trophy, and the remainder coming in the league, but he failed to score. However, his last game came in January against Bury, before he was first dropped and then suffered a series of injuries. He returned from injury in August 2005, ahead of the following season, but was immediately placed on the transfer list and never appeared for Oxford again.

=== Cambridge United ===
Wolleaston was released by Oxford in October 2005 and five months later joined Conference-side Cambridge United on a free transfer, initially on non-contract terms. He made his debut against Altrincham on 11 February 2006, in a 2–1 defeat, and a week later scored only the second goal of his first-team career as Cambridge reversed the scoreline against Southport. The following month he received the first red card of his career against Crawley Town. He helped Cambridge to a mid-table position during 13 games, and scored twice more, both in a 2–1 victory against Scarborough.

Manager Rob Newman rewarded Wolleaston's good form by offering him a new contract to stay with Cambridge for the 2006–07 season. Wolleaston scored only one goal during his second season, in 35 league games for Cambridge, as they finished in 18th place, just four points above the relegation zone.

He was rewarded with another one-year deal by new manager Jimmy Quinn, who called him "as good a midfielder as you'll see in this division." Wolleaston showed his best goal-scoring form during the 2007–08, recording five goals during the league campaign. His goals helped Cambridge to two five-goal defeats of first Farsley Celtic, then Droylsden. He played 44 league games during the season to help Cambridge both to the third round of the FA Cup, where they lost to Wolverhampton Wanderers, and the play-offs of the Conference National. The first leg of the semi-final against Burton Albion ended in a 2–2 draw, before Wolleaston scored twice in the second leg to help Cambridge to a 2–1 victory, and a 4–3 win on aggregate. Cambridge faced fellow league-side Exeter City in the final, but were unable to win promotion back into The Football League, falling to a 1–0 defeat at Wembley Stadium. Despite signing a contract with Cambridge in January 2008 keeping him at the club until 2010, Wolleaston signed for Conference rivals Rushden & Diamonds for an undisclosed fee on 2 June 2008, with Cambridge manager insisting finances would be tight following a series of departures. Wolleaston had played 92 league games for Cambridge, scoring nine goals.

=== Rushden & Diamonds ===
Wolleaston made his debut for Rushden in a 1–0 victory against newly promoted Eastbourne Borough on the opening day of the 2008–09 season. His first goal for his new club came in his ninth game, on 20 September 2008, to help Rushden defeat Burton 2–1. Wolleaston's second goal for Rushden was the sixth of a 9–0 victory against Weymouth, who had been forced to field a youth team because of the club's financial problems which lead to the first team going unpaid for two months. The scoreline was Rushden's record-breaking victory. Wolleaston spent much of his final season with Rushden on the sidelines with a knee and calf injuries.

=== Farnborough ===
Wolleaston moved onto Farnborough on a month-by-month contract, but left in September 2010.

=== Weymouth ===
Along with Courtney Pitt, Wolleaston signed for Southern League Premier Division side Weymouth in September 2010 on a non-contract basis. He made his debut against league leaders Cambridge City on 18 September, with his new side losing 3–0. Both he and Pitt were reported to have made "polished displays in midfield". Wolleaston was rewarded with a contract keeping him at Weymouth until May 2012. Wolleaston was released by Weymouth on 5 September 2011, joining Harrow Borough soon after. In total, Wolleaston played 27 times in the league for Weymouth, netting four goals.

=== Harrow Borough ===
Having joined Harrow Borough in September 2011, Wolleaston became an integral part of the side making over 100 appearances in all competitions (98 in the league up to the end of the 2013–14 season). Wolleaston left Harrow Borough in the summer of 2014.

== Personal life ==
Wolleaston has two sons and a daughter. Mason, Bay and Freya
