= Samuele Dalla Bona =

Italian former professional footballer

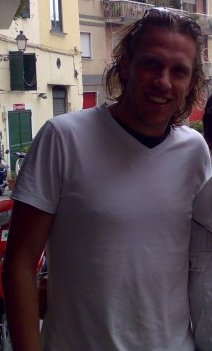

Personal information
- Date of birth: 6 February 1981 (age 45)
- Place of birth: San Donà di Piave, Italy
- Height: 1.85 m (6 ft 1 in)
- Position: Midfielder

Youth career
- 1996–1998: Atalanta
- 1998–1999: Chelsea

Senior career*
Years	Team	Apps	(Gls)
1999–2002	Chelsea	55	(6)
2002–2006	Milan	4	(0)
2003–2004	→ Bologna (loan)	19	(3)
2004–2005	→ Lecce (loan)	36	(6)
2005–2006	→ Sampdoria (loan)	29	(0)
2006–2011	Napoli	34	(3)
2009–2010	→ Iraklis (loan)	2	(0)
2010	→ Verona (loan)	2	(0)
2010–2011	→ Atalanta (loan)	0	(0)
2011–2012	Mantova	8	(0)
Total		189	(18)

International career
1996–1998	Italy U15	27	(9)
1999–2000	Italy U18	10	(2)
2002–2003	Italy U21	9	(0)
- * Club domestic league appearances and goals as of 30 May 2010

Samuele "Sam" Dalla Bona (born 6 February 1981) is an Italian former professional footballer who played as a midfielder.

== Career ==
=== Chelsea ===
By the time he was 17 years old, he was captain of the under 18 national side, and was signed by Premier League club Chelsea in October 1998. Dalla Bona's move to London saw the Italian Football Federation amend the legislation regarding the sale of their young players.

The young midfielder was brought into the youth and reserve team squads at Chelsea first, gaining a reputation for prolific goalscoring with 16 reserve team goals, winning the club golden boot in 1998–99. In the same season, he was voted Chelsea's young player of the year.

He made his senior team debut for the club against Feyenoord in the Champions League a year later in November 1999. The following season, 2000–01, Dalla Bona got an extended run in the side, making 32 appearances in that season and scoring 2 goals. He was boosted further by the departure of older midfielders Dennis Wise and Gus Poyet in 2001 and some impressive performances. In his final season at Chelsea, 2001–02, he contributed 4 more goals in the Premier League, including an injury time winner against Ipswich Town and the third in a 4-0 thrashing of Liverpool. He also played during some of the matches in Chelsea's 2001–02 FA Cup run; the team were eventual runners-up to Arsenal, though Dalla Bona did not play in the final.

However, Dalla Bona turned down a contract extension, citing his desire to return to Italy, and was placed on the transfer list. Consequently, Dalla Bona fell out of favour and was forced to train with the reserves by Chelsea manager Claudio Ranieri.

=== A.C. Milan ===
Dalla Bona had decided to move back to his home nation of Italy. Numerous clubs were interested in the player, including his home town club Venezia who had a £5 million offer accepted but Dalla Bona decided his future lay elsewhere and turned down the opportunity.

He moved to A.C. Milan for around £1 million in July 2002, having played 73 games for Chelsea in all competitions and scored six goals. Dalla Bona made his Serie A debut on 6 October 2002 as Milan defeated Torino 6–0. During his first season at Milan, he received Champions League and Coppa Italia winners medals along with the rest of the squad.

Facing competition from a star-studded Milan midfield containing the likes of Gennaro Gattuso, Clarence Seedorf and Andrea Pirlo, Dalla Bona's opportunities at the club were limited and he spent various seasons on loan at different clubs in Italy, the first of which was a year-long loan at Bologna. The following season he was loaned to Lecce having made just a handful of appearances for Milan, and in 2005 he was loaned to Sampdoria for a season.

=== Napoli ===
At the end of the championship he returned to Milan, but after a few weeks he signed for Napoli, then in the Italian Serie B league, on free transfer, despite still having a year left in his contract. Dalla Bona had a positive start at Napoli, with the club performing well in Serie B. His contributions to the team included a particularly stunning goal, a left footed volley from outside the box against Treviso. However, as Napoli made their return to Serie A, Dalla Bona was again regularly left out of the starting line, with Napoli signing new players.

On 4 February 2009, Dalla Bona announced that he had left Napoli and was hoping to train with West Ham United to secure a permanent contract under former Chelsea teammate Gianfranco Zola. Dalla Bona announced he had rejected an offer from Serie B side Triestina because of this. He ultimately failed to secure a contract with West Ham, and after another unsuccessful training spell with Fulham, he returned to Napoli.

On 7 August 2009, Iraklis signed Dalla Bona on loan from Napoli for a season. However, he failed to adjust in the team, mainly due to lack of fitness, and his loan was terminated in December 2009, after making just three appearances (all as a substitute) in competitive matches. On 1 February 2010, he was signed by third division side Verona.

On 31 August 2010, he was loaned to Atalanta. However, Dalla Bona failed again to adjust to the team, and by the end of the season managed just a single appearance, in the Coppa Italia.

=== Mantova ===
On 31 August 2011, the final day of the summer transfer window, Dalla Bona signed a one-year contract for Mantova

== Honours ==
A.C. Milan

- Coppa Italia: 2002–03
- UEFA Champions League: 2002–03
