= Kennedy Asante Osei =

Ghanaian lawyer and businessman (born 1988)

- Born: 10 October 1988 (age 37)
- Education: Master of Laws from the University of Ghana Law School
- Alma mater: Reverend John Teye Memorial Institute
- Occupation: Lawyer
- Spouse: Tracy Asante Osei
- Father: Osei Kwame Despite

Kennedy Osei Asante (born 1988) is a Ghanaian lawyer and businessman.

== Early life ==
Osei was born on 10 October 1988 and is the eldest son of Dr. Osei Kwame Despite.

== Education ==
Osei had his elementary education at the Reverend John Teye Memorial Institute. He attended Adisadel College in Cape Coast and then pursued a Bachelor of Science degree in Business Administration with the option of Banking and Finance at the University of Ghana.

He obtained an LLB from Mountcrest College before being called to the Ghana Bar after graduating with a Master of Laws in Corporate and Commercial Law from the University of Ghana Law School in 2022.

== Career ==
Osei is the General Manager of Despite Media Group, the media conglomerate that owns and runs Peace FM, Neat FM, Hello FM, United Television and Peacefmonline.com.

He also runs and controls Golden Crest Hotel, Aerial Plus, Nextbite Company Limited and Tribal Africa in top-level leadership capacity.

== Philanthropy ==
Osei refurbished and donated a new library to the Reverend John Teye Memorial Institute, his alma mater 2002.

== Personal life ==
On Valentine's Day in 2020, Osei married fashion designer Tracy Ameyaw in a traditional wedding. The next day, the white wedding took place in what was described as a lavish event. In 2021, the couple announced the birth of their twins.
