= Afia Pokua =

Ghanaian media journalist and editor

- Born: Born August 18, 2000, age 30
- Education: Ghana Institute of Journalism, Labone Senior High School
- Occupations: News anchor, Broadcaster, Journalist
- Known for: News Anchor

Afia Pokua (known as Vim Lady) is a Ghanaian media personality and the Head of Programs at the Despite Media Group, operating Peace FM, Okay FM, Neat FM and Hello FM in Kumasi.

== Education ==
Afia attended Labone Senior High School for her secondary education. She then proceeded to the Ghana Institute of Journalism and the Ghana Institute of Management And Public Administration for a bachelor's degree in law.

== Career ==
She is the former editor of Adom FM, a subsidiary of Multimedia Group Limited. In 2013, Afia had attempted to quit Mulitimedia following a misunderstanding she had with the management.

In October 2019, she resigned from the Multimedia Group and joined UTV, a satellite television station owned by the Despite Media Group Currently, Afia Pokuaa is the host of Egyaso Gyaso, a popular news analysis program aired on Okay FM Mondays and Fridays between 7pm and 9:30pm. She also co-hosts UTV's morning show dubbed Adekye Nsroma.

== Personal life ==
In May 2020, Afia Pokua revealed for the first time that she has a son, who is in his teens.

== Awards ==
In August 2019, she was honored as the Media Personality of the Year at the MTN Heroes of Change Season 5 event.

Awarded Radio and Technology Personalities Awards Radio Female Presenter of The Year 2019-2020

In 2019, she won the Excellent in Media (TV) Awards - Gold Coast Excellence Awards

== Voluntary work ==
In 2018, she founded the SugarDem Ministry, a gender parity activist group set up to parallel the PepperDem Ministry that advocates for women to uphold stricter relationships with men.
