= Labone (disambiguation) =

Labone is a district of Accra, Ghana.

It may also refer to:

== People ==
- Brian Labone (1940–2006), English footballer
- Jean Luc Labone, 2013 French bronze medalist in the Europe (dinghy)
- Vicky Labone, character played by Moira Lister in the British TV series Late Night Theatre
- Miss Labone, character played by Joan Glover in the 1997 film Lolita

== Other uses ==
- Labone Senior High School, a public school in Accra, Ghana
- LabOne, a corporation acquired in 2005 by Quest Diagnostics

== See also ==
- La Bonne, a 1986 Italian erotic film
