= Abigail Ashley =

Ghanaian television presenter and radio host

- Occupations: Television presenter, radio host, health advocate

Abigail Ashley is a Ghanaian television presenter, radio host, health advocate and the project leader for Behind My Smiles Foundation - a non-governmental organization (NGO) focusing on kidney health. She is also the author of the book "A Decade of My Life" Behind My Smiles.

== Education ==
Ashley attended the GH Fashion School in Accra.

== Career ==
Ashley is the presenter and host for "My Health, My Life" on United Television Ghana. She is also the host of Mo Ho Y3 on Okay FM.

=== Discography ===
- Aseda Ndwom featuring TMI

== Personal life ==
In August 2007, she was diagnosed and survived chronic kidney disease stage after being given 5 years to live. She underwent a surgery for a kidney transplant.

== Awards and nomination ==
In 2016, 2017 and 2018, she was awarded at the Health Legends' Awards

In 2017 she was nominated for "50 Young Most Influential people in Ghana".

In November 2019, she was honored at the 9th Edition of the 3G Awards in Bronx in New York in the USA. She was awarded for her contributions towards individuals and her campaigns on living healthy lives.

In 2020, she was honored with the Social Media Health Advocate of the Year award in recognition for using social media to promote health care and healthy lifestyle.

In July 2023, she won four awards at the GH Fashion School in Accra. The awards were Best Student in Fashion Business, Best Student in Machinery, Most Promising Fashion Student, and Best Student in Garment Construction.
