= Osei Kwame Despite =

Ghanaian media entrepreneur

Despite Kwame Osei
- Born: 2 February 1962 (age 64)
- Occupation: Businessman
- Known for: CEO of Despite Group of Companies
- Children: Kennedy Asante Osei

Mr. Osei Kwame Despite (born 2 February 1962) is a Ghanaian entrepreneur and a philanthropist with a foundation in music creation and knowledge of the broadcasting sector. Osei Kwame is the CEO of the Despite Firm Ltd, a trade company with subsidiaries in the media industry, including UTV, Peace FM, Okay FM, Neat FM and Hello FM in Kumasi. He was named Africa Entrepreneur of the Year at the African Achievers Awards in the United Kingdom in 2021. He was also honored with GH CAPTAIN's Award in 2019 for his contributions to the socio-economic development of the country.

== Early life ==
He was born in Wiamoase, in the Ashanti region. He began his career as a merchant in Dunkwa-On-Offin, Ghana's Central Region, selling music cassettes, feeding bottles, padlocks, and other items. After years of struggling to make ends meet in the countryside, he and his colleagues relocated to Lagos, Nigeria.

In 1983, he returned to Ghana with other Ghanaians who had fled Nigeria due to the country's political unrest. Back to his country, he only had a trident cassette player and a chain-saw machine. He started a timber contracting business with the chain-saw machine, but it was smashed by a falling tree on his first business trip. He eventually moved on to selling cassette tapes before diversifying his business.

== Career ==
To show his support for the local music industry and to prioritize Ghanaian culture, he moved into radio and founded the PeaceFM at Achimota Mile 7 Junction in 1999. The station's experiments with the Akan language paid off, as radio listeners looking for local programming abandoned stations broadcasting primarily in English on the 104.3 frequency. The radio industry flourished, culminating in the establishment of Hello FM in Kumasi and OkayFM in Accra, as well as peacefmonline.com.

=== List of Companies ===
Now, the Despite Group of Companies (DGC) has the following companies:

- U2 Company Limited (Iodated Salt Production)
- Okay FM
- Peace FM
- Neat FM
- Hello FM
- Despite Stores
- Best Point Savings and Loans (Finance)
- Farming and Building Construction businesses
- Neat Foods Company Limited (which produces and markets NEAT Fufu, NEAT Banku, NEAT Abenkwan, NEAT Hausa Koko, NEAT Dairy Products)
- United Television Company Limited
- Atona Foods LTD ( which produces THIS WAY chocolate drink which comes in different flavors, and the THIS WAY Motherlac children's cereal )
- Despite's Automobile Museum

== Personal life ==
Despite has a wife and nine children. Kennedy Osei Asante, his first son, is the General Manager of Despite Media. He is noted for collecting luxurious vehicles and has a great love for exotic cars. He purchased a $3,000,000 Bugatti Chiron in February 2022 to mark his 60th birthday, making him and Fkay one of just 5 individuals in Africa who own a Bugatti.

== Despite Automobile Museum ==
In 2025, he opened the Despite Automobile Museum in East Legon, Accra; the facility was commissioned by the Asantehene, Otumfuo Osei Tutu II, on 1 June 2025, and has been described by Ghanaian media as Ghana’s first “world-class” automobile museum, with reports highlighting a collection of more than 60 classic and luxury vehicles.
