= Boys Abre: The Preacher =

Boys Abre: The Preacher is a Ghanaian comic and drama TV series produced and directed by Abraham Kofi Davies. The series is aired on United Television Ghana (UTV).

== Cast ==
- Abraham Kofi Davies (Salinko)
- Justice Hymns (Mmebusem)
- Matilda Asare
- Ama Odumaa Odum (Safoa Hemaa)
- Koo Appiah
- Quappiah
- Wofa K
- Kompany
- Amankwah

== Awards ==
- The movie won the 2018-2019 Radio & TV Personality Awards (RTP) as local TV series of the year.
