= Fadda Dickson =

Ghanaian media executive

Fadda Dickson Narh (born Jan 1) is a Ghanaian media personality and executive. He is the General Manager for Despite Media Group, the media conglomerate that owns and operates Peace FM, Neat FM, Hello FM, Okay FM, United Television and Peacefmonline.com.

== Education ==
He has two honorary doctorate degrees; one from the Alfred Noble University In Ukraine. He also holds another honorary Doctor of Philosophy degree in Executive Leadership and Business Administration from the George Fox University In the United States of America.

== Career ==
He joined Despite Media as the Administration and Finance manager of Peace FM in 1999 and rose through the ranks to become the Managing Director of Despite Group.

After launching United Television in 2013, Fadda supervised its growth as an Executive Producer to become the most watched television station in Ghana in 2015 and 2017, according to a Geopoll survey.

== Awards ==
- In 2011, he was awarded the Excellence Award in Radio Management at the RTP Awards
- He won the Excellence in Radio Management award at the 2016 RTP Awards.
- He was inducted into the Hall of Fame at the 2nd annual Ghana Entertainment Awards Celebration in 2018.
- He won the special honorary award for the Excellence in Media Management at the Gold Coast Excellence Awards in 2019.
- He won the Superhero Award at the 2020 RTP Awards
- He won the Personality of the Year at the 2021 RTP Awards
- He won the Male Personality of the year at the Africa Business and Arts Awards in 2021

== Personal life ==
He is married to Kate Dickson Narh and has two children
