= Marcel Desailly =

French footballer (born 1968)

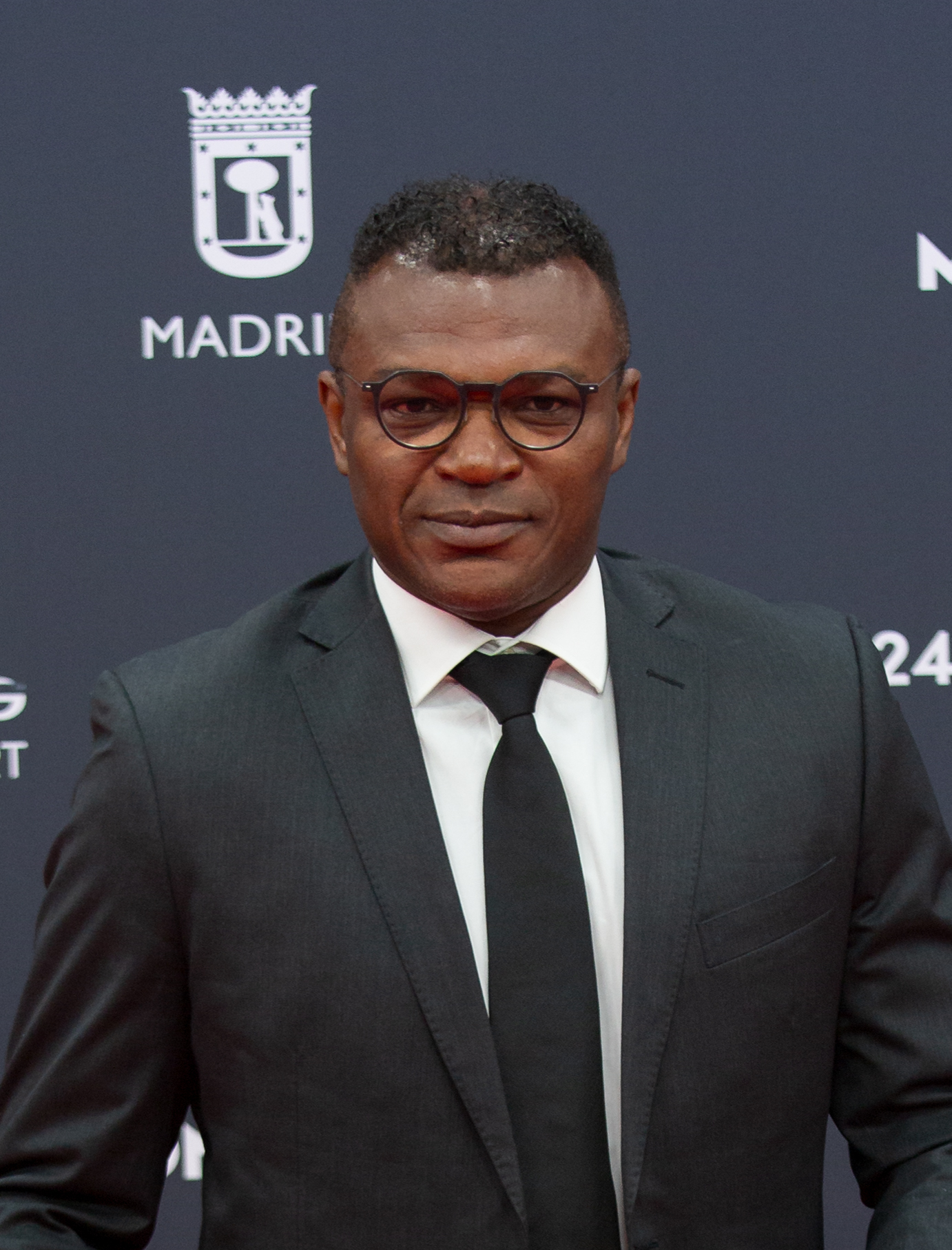
- Desailly at the 2024 Laureus World Sports Awards

Personal information
- Full name: Marcel David Desailly
- Date of birth: 7 September 1968 (age 58)
- Place of birth: Accra, Ghana
- Height: 1.85 m (6 ft 1 in)
- Positions: Centre-back; defensive midfielder

Youth career
- 1980–1986: Nantes

Senior career*
| Years | Team | Apps | (Gls) |
| 1986–1992 | Nantes | 162 | (5) |
| 1992–1993 | Marseille | 47 | (1) |
| 1993–1998 | AC Milan | 137 | (5) |
| 1998–2004 | Chelsea | 158 | (6) |
| 2004–2005 | Al-Gharafa | 28 | (6) |
| 2005–2006 | Qatar SC | 7 | (0) |
| Total | | 539 | (23) |

International career
| 1993–2004 | France | 116 | (3) |
Medal record
Men's football
Representing France
FIFA World Cup
| Winner | 1998 |
UEFA European Championship
| Winner | 2000 |
FIFA Confederations Cup
| Winner | 2001 |
| Winner | 2003 |
- * Club domestic league appearances and goals

Marcel David Desailly (French pronunciation: [maʁsɛl dəsaji]; born 7 September 1968) is a former professional footballer, who played as a centre-back or defensive midfielder. During a successful career at club level, lasting from 1986 to 2006, Desailly won several titles, including UEFA Champions League medals with both Marseille and AC Milan, and also played for Nantes and Chelsea, among other teams. At international level, he collected 116 caps between 1993 and 2004, scoring three goals, and was a member of the France international squads that won the 1998 World Cup and Euro 2000.

Desailly is regarded by many commentators as one of the leading players of his generation and among the most accomplished defenders in the history of the sport.

== Early life ==
Marcel David Desailly was born on 7 September 1968 in Accra, Ghana, to Elizabeth Addy. Elizabeth married Mr Abbey, an architect, and became pregnant with Desailly while Marcel Desailly Sr., a diplomat who would become Desailly's adoptive father, was away in France. He was adopted by Desailly Sr. soon after he was born and was named after his adoptive father, instead of Odenkey Abbey, the name preferred by his biological father. His mother married Desailly Sr., who adopted all of her children (the former professional footballer Seth Adonkor, seven years his elder, was a half-brother of his). The family relocated to France when Desailly was four years old.

== Club career ==
Following Adonkor's lead, Desailly began his career at Nantes. There, as part of the famed Nantes youth programme, he played alongside a young Didier Deschamps, who became his closest friend. Desailly turned professional in 1986, two years after his half-brother had died in a car accident. In 1992, he moved to Marseille, where he reunited with Deschamps, and won the UEFA Champions League the following year. In 1994, while playing for AC Milan, he again won the Cup (scoring in the final himself), becoming the first player to win the rebranded tournament with two different clubs, and also the first ever player to win the Cup with different clubs in consecutive seasons. During his time in Milan, he won two Italian league titles, in 1994 and 1996. Although he preferred to be deployed as a sweeper or centre-back, roles which he played during his time in France, he found much success playing as a defensive midfielder for Milan, alongside Demetrio Albertini, due to the presence of several other established centre-backs at the club, such as Franco Baresi, Alessandro Costacurta and Filippo Galli.

Desailly then moved to the English club Chelsea in 1998 for £4.6 million, where he captained the side and played sweeper and centre-back until the end of the 2003–04 season. It was at Chelsea that Desailly formed a formidable partnership with Frank Leboeuf. He picked up one major trophy in his six seasons at Stamford Bridge, being on the winning side in their FA Cup triumph over Aston Villa in 2000.

Desailly was snapped up by Qatari outfit Al-Gharafa in 2004. He was appointed as the club captain and under the French coach Bruno Metsu they won the Qatar League in 2005. He then joined Qatar S.C., leading them to second place in the league before retiring from professional football.

In 2014, Desailly had met the Football Association of Malaysia and said he was ready and willing to coach the Malaysia national team. He also pointed that it was up to the football association whether to hire him or not.

== International career ==
During an interview in Ghana, Desailly stated that he "did not have much choice about which country to play for," as he was "already established in the French national youth football team." This stance was restated in his autobiography, published in 2002. He made his international debut in 1993, but was not established as a first choice defender until 1996.

He was an important part of the French team which won the 1998 FIFA World Cup, albeit being sent off by referee Said Belqola in the final match, a 3–0 victory over defending champions Brazil, for a double booking, being the only player on the winning team to be dismissed in a World Cup final. Like other team members, he was appointed a Knight of the Legion of Honour in 1998.

Two years later, success continued as France won UEFA Euro 2000. After the tournament, Desailly was made captain of the national team, following the retirement of Didier Deschamps. In 2001, he led France to victory in the Confederations Cup.

In April 2003, Desailly surpassed the record for the number of appearances for the French team, a number which eventually reached 116 when he announced his retirement from international football following 2004 UEFA European Football Championship. However, that record was broken during the 2006 FIFA World Cup by Lilian Thuram.

== Style of play ==
Nicknamed "The Rock" due to his consistency, strength, and hard-tackling playing style, Desailly is considered one of the most accomplished players of his generation, and one of the finest defenders ever. He stood out for his charismatic leadership and ability to organise his team's back-line and break down opposition plays throughout his career. He excelled in the air and at anticipating his opponents, combining his aggression, stamina, and ability to read the game, with his physical, mental, and defensive skills. A notable confidence and good technique on the ball also allowed him to play in midfield throughout his career; after moving to Milan, although he initially started out playing as a centre-back or sweeper, and occasionally even as a full-back, he was later deployed as a defensive midfielder, a position in which he also excelled, successfully filling the void left by the departure of Frank Rijkaard due his ball-winning abilities and capacity to start attacking plays after winning back possession. In addition to his defensive skills, he was also capable of contributing to his team's offensive plays with goals by making attacking runs into the box. In 2004, he was named by Pelé in the FIFA 100 as one of the world's greatest living players.

== Legacy ==
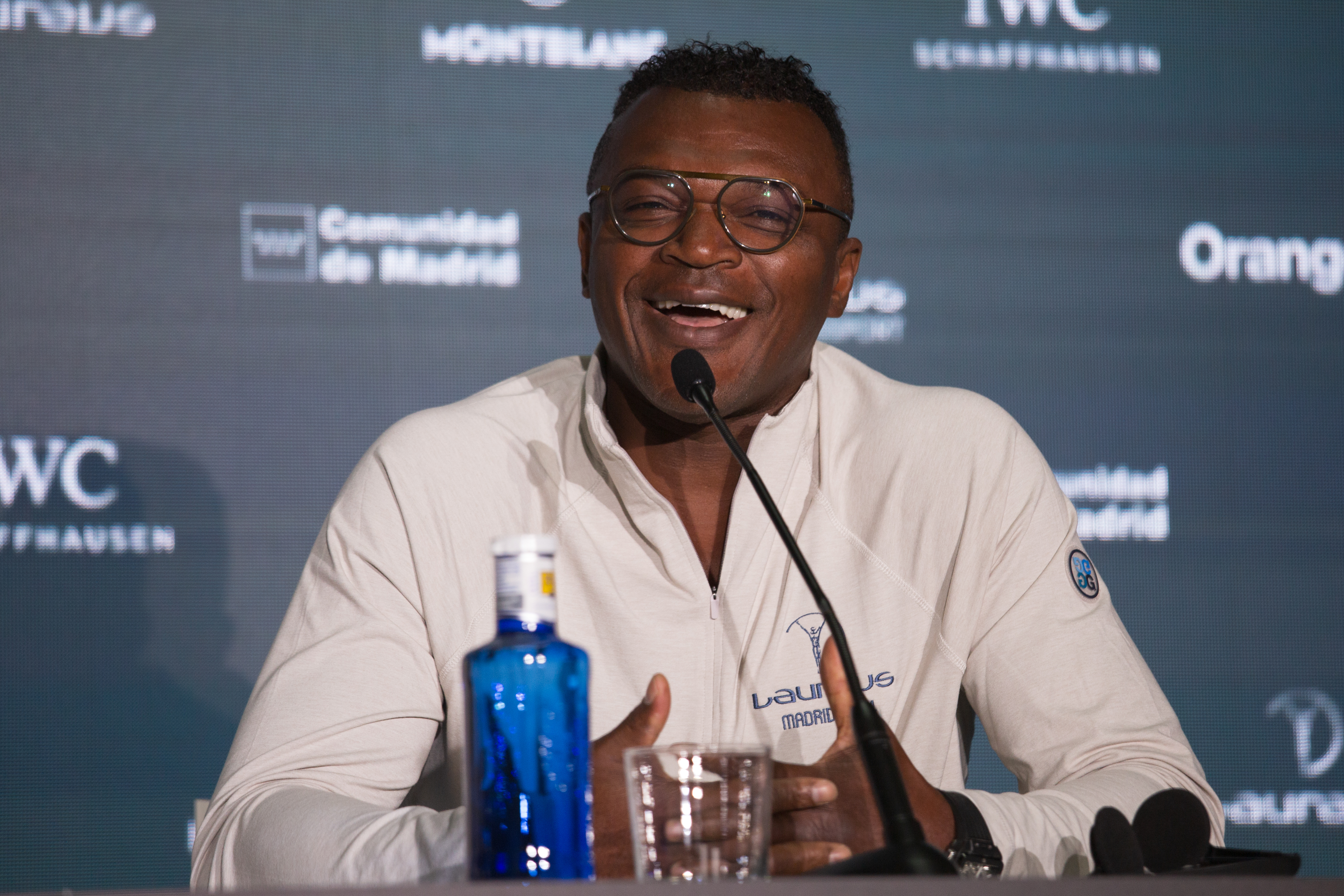
Desailly at a press conference during the celebration of the 2024 Laureus World Sports Awards

Desailly is currently residing in Ghana. He is currently a Laureus Academy member and OrphanAid Africa Lifetime ambassador to Ghana and France (since 2005). He was mentioned as a possible candidate for the coaching position of the Ghana national team. He has since pulled out of the race to coach the Ghana national team, although the option is likely to keep coming up. In June 2011, he opened a sports facility in Ghana called Lizzy Sports Complex, in memory of his late mother, geared to young players and children in particular. Many African national teams use the centre as a camp to prepare for international tournaments. Desailly sold his interest in the business to Osei Kwame Despite in October 2019.

== Post-playing career ==
Desailly's autobiography, Capitaine, was published in 2002.

=== Media work ===
Following retirement, Desailly became a pundit for BBC Sport predominantly giving his opinion from the touchline at both half time and full-time as opposed to residing in the studio with Alan Hansen, Alan Shearer and Martin O'Neill.

He worked for BBC Sport in the United Kingdom during the 2006 World Cup, as one of their Match of the Day analysts.

He also worked for BBC Sport at the 2008 Africa Cup of Nations and Euro 2008 and is a regular commentator for French television channel Canal Plus.

He also became a spokesperson for sports betting website Betclic.

In 2010, Desailly joined the ITV Sport team for their World Cup coverage from South Africa.

=== Charity work ===
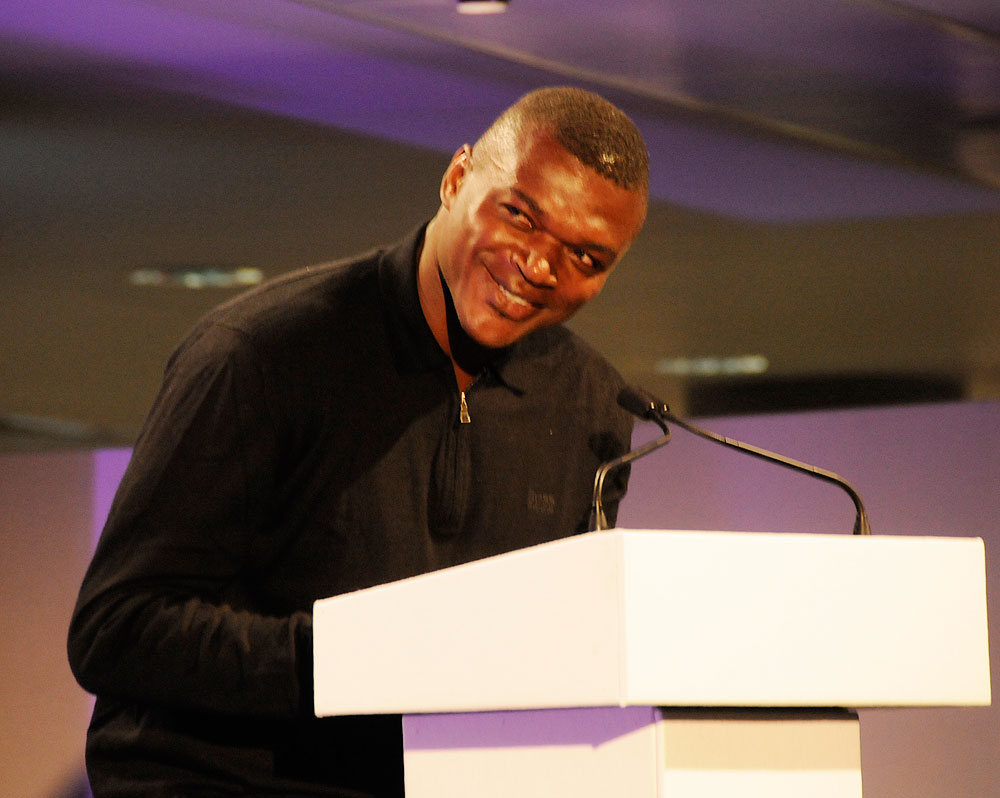
Desailly on stage at the launch of 1GOAL Education for All in 2009.

Desailly is a supporter of the 1GOAL Education for All campaign. He is also the UNICEF national Goodwill Ambassador for Ghana. He is the Lifetime Goodwill Ambassador for his personal Charity OrphanAid Africa, that helps abandoned children in Ghana. He is a member of the Laureus Sports for Good Foundation.

=== Licensed merchandise ===
A mobile video game entitled Marcel Desailly Pro Soccer, developed by Gameloft was released for mobile phones in 2003. In France Ubisoft released versions of the game for PlayStation and PlayStation 2. Desailly is an ICON in FIFA 21 Ultimate Team and FIFA 22 Ultimate Team with ratings of 87 (base), 88 (mid), 91 (prime), and 92 (Prime Icon Moments)in both games.

== Personal life ==
Desailly is married to Virginie Desailly, and as of October 1998 has three children. His nephew James Édouard Adams is a semi-professional footballer.

== Career statistics ==
=== Club ===
Appearances and goals by club, season and competition
| Club | Season | League | | | National cup | | League cup | | Continental | | Other | | Total | |
| Club | Season | Division | Apps | Goals | Apps | Goals | Apps | Goals | Apps | Goals | Apps | Goals | Apps | Goals |
|---|---|---|---|---|---|---|---|---|---|---|---|---|---|---|
| Nantes | 1986–87 | Division 1 | 13 | 0 | 1 | 0 | – | | 2 | 0 | – | | 16 | 0 |
| Nantes | 1987–88 | Division 1 | 11 | 0 | 1 | 0 | – | | – | | – | | 12 | 0 |
| Nantes | 1988–89 | Division 1 | 36 | 1 | 4 | 0 | – | | – | | – | | 40 | 1 |
| Nantes | 1989–90 | Division 1 | 36 | 1 | 3 | 0 | – | | – | | – | | 39 | 1 |
| Nantes | 1990–91 | Division 1 | 34 | 1 | 4 | 0 | – | | – | | – | | 38 | 1 |
| Nantes | 1991–92 | Division 1 | 32 | 2 | 1 | 0 | – | | – | | – | | 33 | 2 |
| Nantes | Total | | 162 | 5 | 14 | 0 | — | | 2 | 0 | — | | 178 | 5 |
| Marseille | 1992–93 | Division 1 | 31 | 1 | 3 | 0 | – | | 10 | 1 | – | | 44 | 2 |
| Marseille | 1993–94 | Division 1 | 16 | 0 | 0 | 0 | – | | – | | – | | 16 | 0 |
| Marseille | Total | | 47 | 1 | 3 | 0 | — | | 10 | 1 | — | | 60 | 2 |
| AC Milan | 1993–94 | Serie A | 21 | 1 | 1 | 0 | 0 | 0 | 6 | 2 | 3 | 0 | 31 | 3 |
| AC Milan | 1994–95 | Serie A | 22 | 1 | 1 | 0 | 0 | 0 | 10 | 0 | 3 | 0 | 36 | 1 |
| AC Milan | 1995–96 | Serie A | 32 | 2 | 1 | 0 | – | | 7 | 0 | – | | 40 | 2 |
| AC Milan | 1996–97 | Serie A | 29 | 1 | 3 | 0 | 1 | 0 | 5 | 0 | – | | 38 | 1 |
| AC Milan | 1997–98 | Serie A | 33 | 0 | 8 | 0 | – | | – | | – | | 41 | 0 |
| AC Milan | Total | | 137 | 5 | 14 | 0 | 1 | 0 | 28 | 2 | 6 | 0 | 186 | 7 |
| Chelsea | 1998–99 | Premier League | 31 | 0 | 6 | 0 | 0 | 0 | 7 | 1 | 1 | 0 | 45 | 1 |
| Chelsea | 1999–2000 | Premier League | 23 | 1 | 4 | 0 | 0 | 0 | 16 | 0 | – | | 43 | 1 |
| Chelsea | 2000–01 | Premier League | 34 | 2 | 2 | 0 | 1 | 0 | 1 | 0 | 1 | 0 | 39 | 2 |
| Chelsea | 2001–02 | Premier League | 24 | 1 | 8 | 0 | 3 | 0 | 2 | 0 | – | | 37 | 1 |
| Chelsea | 2002–03 | Premier League | 31 | 2 | 1 | 0 | 0 | 0 | 1 | 0 | – | | 33 | 2 |
| Chelsea | 2003–04 | Premier League | 15 | 0 | 1 | 0 | 1 | 0 | 8 | 0 | – | | 25 | 0 |
| Chelsea | Total | | 158 | 6 | 22 | 0 | 5 | 0 | 35 | 1 | 2 | 0 | 222 | 7 |
| Al-Gharafa | 2004–05 | Stars League | 28 | 6 | | | | | – | | – | | 28 | 6 |
| Qatar SC | 2005–06 | Stars League | 7 | 0 | | | | | – | | – | | 7 | 0 |
| Career total | | | 539 | 23 | 53 | 0 | 6 | 0 | 75 | 4 | 8 | 0 | 681 | 27 |

=== International ===
Appearances and goals by national team and year
| National team | Year | Apps | Goals |
|---|---|---|---|
| France | 1993 | 4 | 0 |
| France | 1994 | 7 | 0 |
| France | 1995 | 7 | 1 |
| France | 1996 | 12 | 0 |
| France | 1997 | 7 | 0 |
| France | 1998 | 13 | 1 |
| France | 1999 | 11 | 0 |
| France | 2000 | 16 | 0 |
| France | 2001 | 12 | 1 |
| France | 2002 | 13 | 0 |
| France | 2003 | 9 | 0 |
| France | 2004 | 5 | 0 |
| Total | | 116 | 3 |

Scores and results list France's goal tally first, score column indicates score after each Desailly goal

List of international goals scored by Marcel Desailly
| No. | Date | Venue | Opponent | Score | Result | Competition |
|---|---|---|---|---|---|---|
| 1 | 6 September 1995 | Stade de l'Abbé-Deschamps, Auxerre, France | Azerbaijan | 1–0 | 10–0 | UEFA Euro 1996 qualifying |
| 2 | 25 January 1998 | Stade Vélodrome, Marseille, France | Norway | 3–3 | 3–3 | Friendly |
| 3 | 7 June 2001 | Suwon World Cup Stadium, Suwon, South Korea | Brazil | 2–1 | 2–1 | 2001 FIFA Confederations Cup |

== Honours ==
Marseille

- UEFA Champions League: 1992–93

AC Milan

- Serie A: 1993–94, 1995–96
- Supercoppa Italiana: 1994
- UEFA Champions League: 1993–94
- European Super Cup: 1994

Chelsea

- FA Cup: 1999–2000
- FA Charity Shield: 2000
- UEFA Super Cup: 1998

Al-Gharafa

- Qatar Stars League: 2004–05

France

- FIFA World Cup: 1998
- UEFA European Championship: 2000
- FIFA Confederations Cup: 2001, 2003

Individual

- Onze de Onze: 1994, 1995, 1998, 1999, 2000, 2001
- Overseas Team of the Decade – Premier League 10 Seasons Awards (1992/93 – 2001/02)
- Overall Team of the Decade – Premier League 10 Seasons Awards (1992/93 – 2001/02)
- UEFA Euro 1996 Team of the Tournament
- World XI: 1996
- 1998 FIFA World Cup All-Star Team
- UEFA Euro 2000 Team of the Tournament
- FIFA 100: 2004
- Trophée d'honneur UNFP: 2005
- AC Milan Hall of Fame
- Golden Foot Legends Award: 2017

Orders

- Knight of the Legion of Honour: 1998

== See also ==
- List of footballers who won the UEFA Champions League with more than one club
- List of men's footballers with 100 or more international caps
