= Reverend John Teye Memorial Institute =

Location
- Ofankor; Ghana
- Coordinates: 05°40′11″N 00°16′14″W

Information
- Type: Private Christian School
- Motto: Diligence, Integrity and Selflessness
- Established: October 1973; 52 years ago
- Founder: Lawrence John Teye
- Principal: Lawrence John Teye Jr.
- Gender: Mixed
- Language: English
- Website: www.johnteye.edu.gh

The Reverend John Teye Memorial Institute is a private Christian school located at Ofankor in the Greater Accra Region of Ghana. The school is well known in Ghana for its scholarship and for the Reverend John Teye Memorial School Band which is invited often to perform at various occasions including national events.

== History ==
The school was started in October 1973 by Lawrence John Teye. John Teye used to be a teacher at the Accra Girls Senior High School in the 1960s. He started the John Teye Maths and Piano Club at his residence at Kotobabi, a suburb of Accra. It was originally run as an after school club. It became so popular that many other subjects were taught in addition to Music and Piano. The continuing growth and demand for tuition at the club led John Teye to set up the school.

== Academics ==
The school has four sections. They include the Lower Primary and Upper Primary which cater for Years 1 to 3 and Years 4 to 6 respectively. The Secondary section is also divided into the Junior High School and the Senior High Schools. The Senior High School offers four programmes leading to the West African Senior High School Certificate Examination.

== Music ==
The School Band, which is well known in Ghana after featuring often on national TV and at national events went on a European tour in 2002, visiting Germany, Denmark, Netherlands, Switzerland and the United Kingdom. They have also performed in some of Ghana's neighbouring countries, namely Togo and Côte d'Ivoire. The band has also been at the Harrogate International Youth Music Festival in 1993 and the Shrewsbury International Music Festival in 1996. They have also released albums including "He lives" and "Use Me In Thy Vineyard".

== Support ==
The school receives support from various sources. In 2002, a former student, Kennedy Asante Osei, a former student and General Manager at Despite Media Group helped refurbished the school library. The library is now called "Kennedy Asante Osei Study Center" in his honour.

== Notable alumni ==
- Guru (Ghanaian rapper)
- Sista Afia
- Kennedy Asante Osei

== See also ==
- List of senior secondary schools in Ghana
