= Despite Automobile Museum =

Automobile museum in Ghana

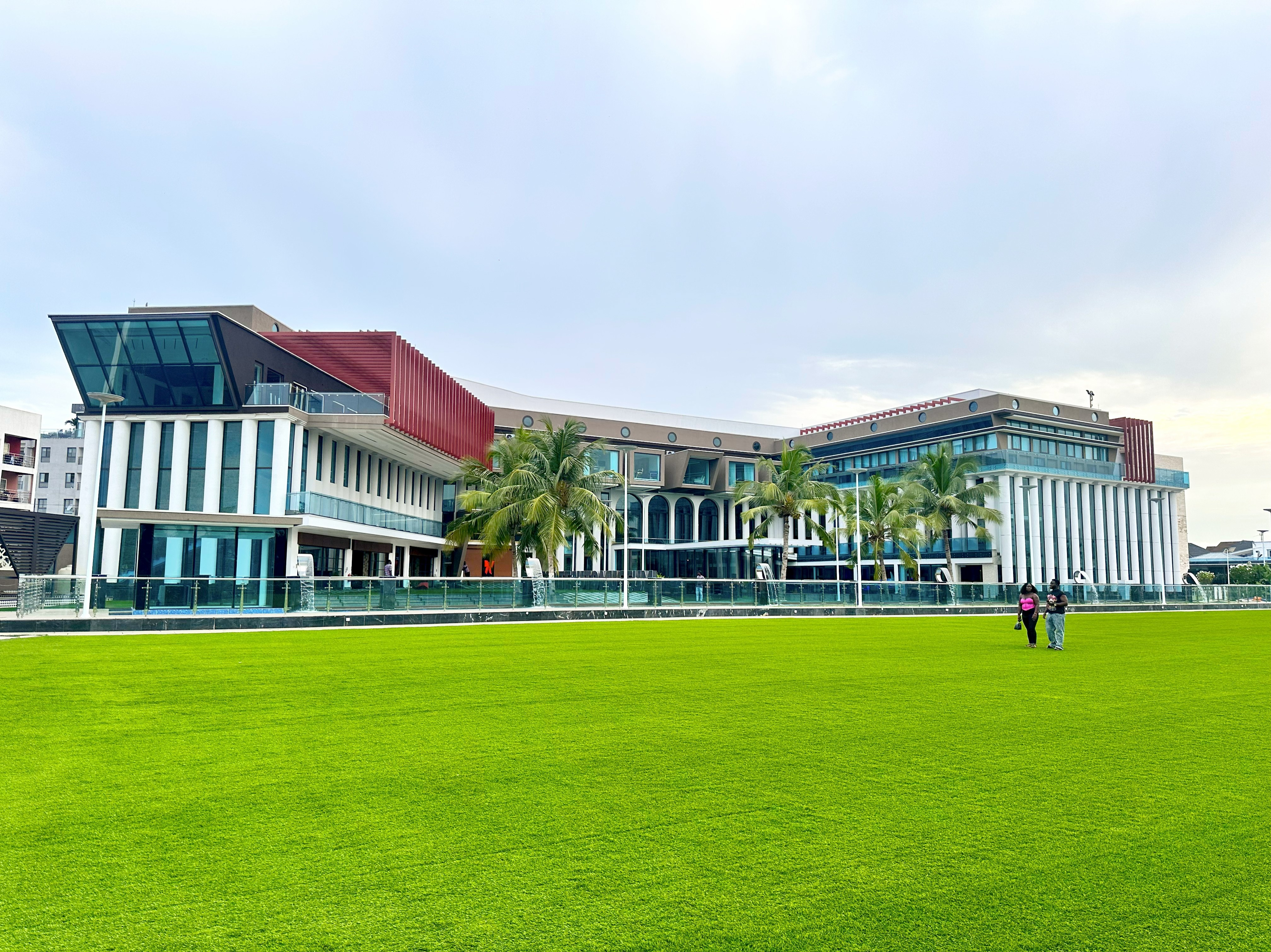
- Front view of the Despite Automobile Museum
- Established: June 1, 2025; 16 months ago
- Location: East Legon, Accra, Ghana
- Coordinates: 5.6436°N 0.1522°W
- Type: Automobile museum
- Collections: Classic cars, luxury cars, sports cars, motorcycles
- Collection size: over 80 cars
- Founder: Osei Kwame Despite
- Website: www.despiteautomuseum.com

Despite Automobile Museum (Despite Auto Museum) is a privately owned automobile museum in Accra, Ghana. It was established by Ghanaian entrepreneur Osei Kwame Despite from his private car collection. The museum exhibits more than 80 automobiles, including both modern and vintage models.

== History ==
The museum was commissioned on 1 June 2025 by Otumfuo Osei Tutu II, the Asantehene and opened to the public on 6th June 2025. The collection grew from the personal automobile collection of Ghanaian entrepreneur Osei Kwame Despite, who is known for his passion for cars.

== Location ==
The museum is located on Cotton Street in East Legon, Accra, Ghana, on the site formerly occupied by the Lizzy Sports Complex.

== Collection ==
The museum's collection includes classic, vintage, luxury and modern performance vehicles, as well as motorcycles including models produced by manufacturers such as Bugatti, Rolls-Royce, Bentley, Mercedes-Benz, Jaguar and Harley-Davidson including a Rolls-Royce Silver Wraith LWB, several Bentley models, Mercedes-Benz vehicles, Jaguars and Harley-Davidson motorcycles.

== See also ==
- Osei Kwame Despite
- List of museums in Ghana
- Automobile museum
