= Labone Senior High School =

Public high school in Greater Accra, Ghana

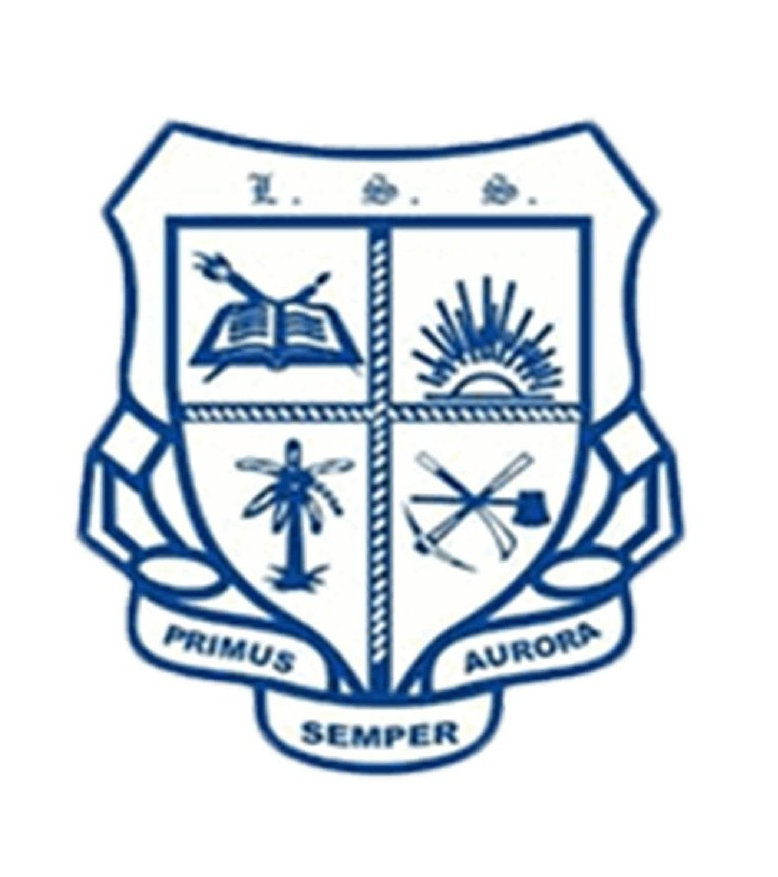
- Labone, Ghana; 5.564925°N 0.171051°W

Information
- Type: Public High School
- Motto: Latin: Primus Semper Aurora (Always First At Dawn)
- Established: 1949; 77 years ago
- School district: La Dade Kotopon Municipal Assembly
- Head of school: Ms Rejoice Akua Acolor
- Staff: 176 teachers
- Grades: Forms 1–3 (10th – 12th grades)
- Gender: Co-educational
- Campus type: Suburban
- Colors: Navy blue and White
- Slogan: Wuo Gbee La Gbee
- Nickname: Labonites
- Affiliation: Labone Old Students Association (LOSA) (Old Bones)
- Address: P. O. Box 079; Osu; Ghana
- Website: LABONE

Labone Senior High School (popularly known as L-A Bone) is a public senior high school located in Labone in the Greater Accra Region of Ghana. It is noted for its success in the National Science and Maths Quiz, athletics, music and cultural activities.

== History ==
In 1949, six leaders of Ghana saw the need to establish an educational institution for young people staying around Osu and La. A private school was established in the Ako Adjei Area.

At independence, the first president of Ghana, Kwame Nkrumah, realized that to accelerate the country's development, educational facilities must be widespread.

The Ghana Educational Trust was instituted and was charged with the construction of school buildings throughout the country, including Labone. The school was relocated to the present site.

In 2024, the school celebrated its 75th anniversary.

In 2025, a fire destroyed dormitories at the school.

== School heads ==
- S. Gyasi Nimako (1961)
- R. Lomo Jones.1961 (196)
- E. A Lamptey.1968 (1982)
- Bossman Owusu Ayim1982 (1990)
- D. H. K. Ofosu (1990)
- Peter Owusu Donkor (1990 - 1995)
- Cecilia Aggrey (Mensah (1995 - 2003)
- Joyce Ossei (Agyekum (2003 - 2013)
- Mary Amankwah (2013 - 2014)
- Kate Bannerman (2014 - 2017)
- Cynthia Obuo Nti (2017 - 2022)
- Rejoice Akua Akorlor (2022 -)

== Notable alumni ==
- Ursula Owusu, member of parliament and minister for communications
- Nii Okaidja Adamafio, member of parliament and interior minister
- Sherry Ayittey, former minister for fisheries and aquaculture
- Samuel Koku Anyidoho, former deputy general-secretary of the National Democratic Congress
- Augustine Tawiah, member of parliament for Bia West Constituency
- Togbe Afede XIV, agbogbomefia of the Asogli State, president of Asogli Traditional Area and former president of the National House of Chiefs
- Berifi Afari Apenteng, former director general of the Ghana Broadcasting Corporation
- Martha Ankomah, Ghanaian film actress and entrepreneur
- Hajia4Reall, Ghanaian socialite, model, musician, business woman
- Adjetey Anang, Ghanaian actor
- Afia Pokua, Ghanaian media personality
- Jemima Nartemle Nartey, vice-chair of the World Scout Committee
- Emmanuel Akwetey, Ghanaian political and governance analyst
- Pearl Amoah, Ghanaian model
- Emmanuel Wayo, hip-hop artist
