= Clarence Seedorf =

Dutch footballer (born 1976)

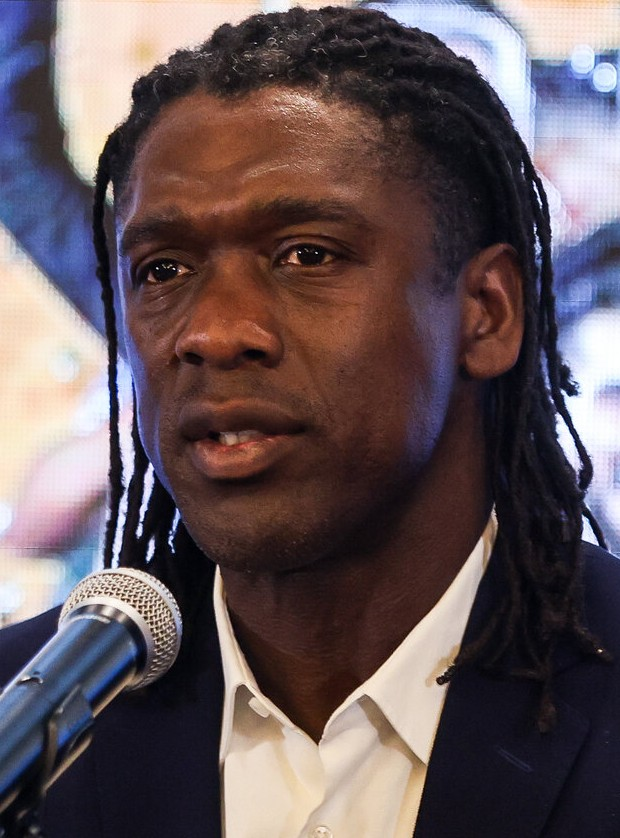
- Seedorf in 2025

Personal information
- Full name: Clarence Clyde Seedorf
- Date of birth: 1 April 1976 (age 50)
- Place of birth: Paramaribo, Suriname
- Height: 1.77 m (5 ft 10 in)
- Position: Midfielder

Team information
- Current team: Corinthians (head coach)

Youth career
- 1982–1983: VV AS' 80
- 1983–1986: Real Almere
- 1986–1992: Ajax

Senior career*
Years	Team	Apps	(Gls)
1992–1995	Ajax	65	(11)
1995–1996	Sampdoria	32	(3)
1996–2000	Real Madrid	121	(15)
2000–2002	Inter Milan	64	(8)
2002–2012	AC Milan	300	(47)
2012–2014	Botafogo	58	(16)
Total		654	(107)

International career
1990	Netherlands U15	1	(1)
1990–1992	Netherlands U17	12	(4)
1990–1992	Netherlands U16	7	(0)
1992–1994	Netherlands U19	21	(8)
1993–1994	Netherlands U18	2	(0)
1993	Netherlands U21	1	(0)
1994–2008	Netherlands	87	(11)

Managerial career
- 2014: AC Milan
- 2016: Shenzhen FC
- 2018: Deportivo La Coruña
- 2018–2019: Cameroon
- 2026–: Corinthians
- * Club domestic league appearances and goals

Clarence Clyde Seedorf (Dutch: [ˈklɛrən ˈseiːdɔr(ə)f]; born 1 April 1976) is a Dutch professional football manager and former professional footballer. He is currently working as the head coach of Campeonato Brasileiro Série A club Corinthians.

Widely regarded as one of the greatest midfielders of all time, Seedorf is one of the most successful players in UEFA Champions League history, as he is the only player to have won the UEFA Champions League with three clubs — once with Ajax in 1995, once with Real Madrid in 1998, and twice with AC Milan in 2003 and in 2007.

At international level, he represented the Netherlands on 87 occasions, and took part in three UEFA European Football Championships (1996, 2000, 2004) and the 1998 FIFA World Cup, reaching the semi-finals of the latter three tournaments.

Including youth internationals, he has made over 1,000 appearances in his career.

In 2004, he was chosen by Pelé as part of the FIFA 100. Seedorf is one of the most decorated Dutch players ever, and has won domestic and continental titles while playing.

== Early life ==
Born in Paramaribo, Suriname, Seedorf was raised in Almere, Flevoland, where he moved when he was two years old. He grew up in a footballing family, with both his younger brothers Jürgen and Chedric Seedorf, and his father, former player and talent agent Johann Seedorf.

== Club career ==
=== Early career ===
Seedorf began his career at the age of six in the youth ranks of his local amateur sides VV AS '80 and Real Almere, before being discovered and recruited to the ranks of nearby Dutch giants Ajax by Urgent Scoutingteam, the talent agency set up by Johan Cruyff, and which was responsible for recruiting the likes of Frank and Ronald de Boer, Edgar Davids, Rob Witschge and Patrick Kluivert to the club as well.

Following in their brother's footsteps, under the guidance of their father and talent agent, Seedorf's siblings, as well as cousin Stefano, would later also join the ranks of Ajax.

=== Ajax ===
A product of the famed Ajax Youth Academy, Seedorf started his career as a right midfielder for Ajax during the early 1990s. He made his professional debut on 29 November 1992 against Groningen at the age of 16 years and 242 days, making him the youngest-ever debutant for Ajax, at the time. He quickly established himself as the first choice on his position under manager Louis van Gaal, and in the 1993–94 season, his second with the club, he helped the Amsterdam-based side win the treble, securing the Eredivisie title, the KNVB Cup and the Dutch Super Cup in the same year. Among his teammates was Frank Rijkaard, the player he used to idolise in his younger days.

The following season, Seedorf helped his team secure consecutive Super Cup and Eredivisie titles, as well as their fourth European Cup trophy, winning the 1994–95 UEFA Champions League after defeating AC Milan in the final. He played a key role in the final before being replaced in the 53rd minute by striker Nwankwo Kanu. Patrick Kluivert scored a late goal to lift Ajax to a 1–0 victory over the Italian giants, whom Seedorf would later go on to represent for a decade. While at Ajax, he was part of a trio known as "De kabel", composed of Edgar Davids, Patrick Kluivert and himself. Later, Winston Bogarde and Michael Reiziger would be added to the group to make it a quintet; what had started as a friendship was then taken over during UEFA Euro 1996 to describe the group.

=== Sampdoria ===
Opting not to extend his contract with Ajax following their European success and the Bosman ruling, Seedorf signed a one-year contract with Italian Serie A side Sampdoria instead. While not able to obtain any silverware in his first season at his new club, Seedorf appeared in 32 matches, scoring three goals helping his side to an eighth-place finish in the league table, all the while maintaining the form he had demonstrated at Ajax in the past. Seedorf was then able to secure a transfer to Real Madrid, moving to Spain's La Liga by the end of the season.

=== Real Madrid ===
Seedorf moved to Real Madrid in 1996, where he was virtually ever present for Los Blancos in his first three seasons. In his first season, he helped the team regain the La Liga title, while in his second season, 1997–98, he played a major role in the team's Champions League success, as Madrid secured a 1–0 victory over Juventus in the final, earning his second Champions League title of his career. While playing for Real Madrid, Seedorf scored a notable long-range goal against Atlético Madrid in 1997. At the end of the 1998–99 season, Madrid and Juventus wanted to swap Seedorf for Zinedine Zidane, but the deal did not go through and the French playmaker waited two more years before joining Real Madrid. Starting from the summer of 1999, Seedorf's role at Real Madrid became less prominent during the tenure of Dutch manager Guus Hiddink at the club. He was eventually transferred back to Italy during the 1999–2000 season, this time to Inter Milan, for a fee of about 44 billion Italian lira (approximately €23 million).

=== Inter Milan ===
On 24 December 1999, Seedorf moved to Inter Milan in a $24.35 million deal after cementing his place in the Real Madrid midfield for over three years. Despite helping the team to the Coppa Italia final later that season – a 2–1 aggregate loss to Lazio where Seedorf scored Inter's only goal – Seedorf could not help bring any major silverware to the club. Nonetheless, he is remembered by many Inter fans for his two goals against Juventus in a 2–2 draw on 9 March 2002, both of which were superb long-range efforts.

=== AC Milan ===
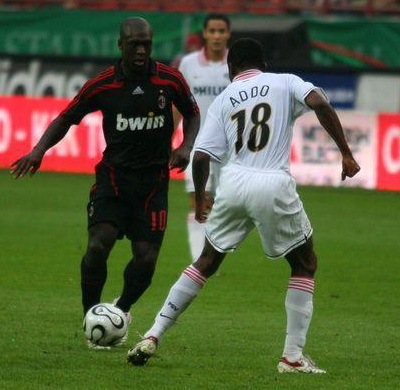
Clarence Seedorf in action for AC Milan against Eric Addo of PSV in a friendly game on 3 August 2007 at the Lokomotiv Stadium, Moscow.

After two years with Inter, Seedorf moved to their rivals AC Milan in 2002, in an exchange with Francesco Coco. Seedorf won the Coppa Italia with Milan in 2003, the first time they had won the competition in 26 years. In the same season, Seedorf gained his third Champions League medal, becoming the first player to win the Champions League with three clubs. The all-Italian final saw Milan beat Juventus on penalties after a 0–0 draw, despite Seedorf failing to convert his own penalty. During the game, he also had to switch roles three times; having started the first half on the left in midfield, in the second he was moved into the center, and eventually onto the right side. The following season, 2003–04, Seedorf played a role in the Milan side that won the Serie A title. It was Seedorf's fourth national league title of his career, following his two Dutch title wins with Ajax and his one Spanish win with Real Madrid.

Seedorf played a major role as Milan reached the Champions League final again in 2005, scoring the only goal of the game in their opening group match against Shakhtar Donetsk on 14 September 2004 and appearing in all 13 competition matches. He started the match against Liverpool in Istanbul in which Milan lost a 3–0 lead, eventually losing on penalties after a 3–3 draw; Seedorf did not take a penalty-kick. Milan also finished runners-up in the Serie A, seven points behind champions Juventus, although Juventus were stripped of the title and Milan docked points for match-fixing.

A match-fixing scandal tarnished Serie A and Milan were weakened by the scandal but were allowed to continue in Europe the following season, which led to their top players remaining with the club. In that season, 2005–06, he scored a goal after just 25 seconds in a 2–2 draw against Schalke.

Seedorf's role as foil to midfielder Kaká became increasingly impressive as the pair combined in style to score and supply the goals which drove Milan past Bayern Munich and Manchester United to another Champions League final, again against Liverpool. This time, however, they defeated them 2–1 in Athens, with Seedorf collecting his fourth Champions League medal. In that same year, Seedorf was a part of the Milan squad that won the 2007 FIFA Club World Cup, becoming the first European player to win the trophy with three clubs (Ajax in 1995 and Real Madrid in 1998). He ended up winning the Silver Ball for the competition for his performances, notably scoring the winner against Urawa Red Diamonds in the semi-final to send his club to the final.

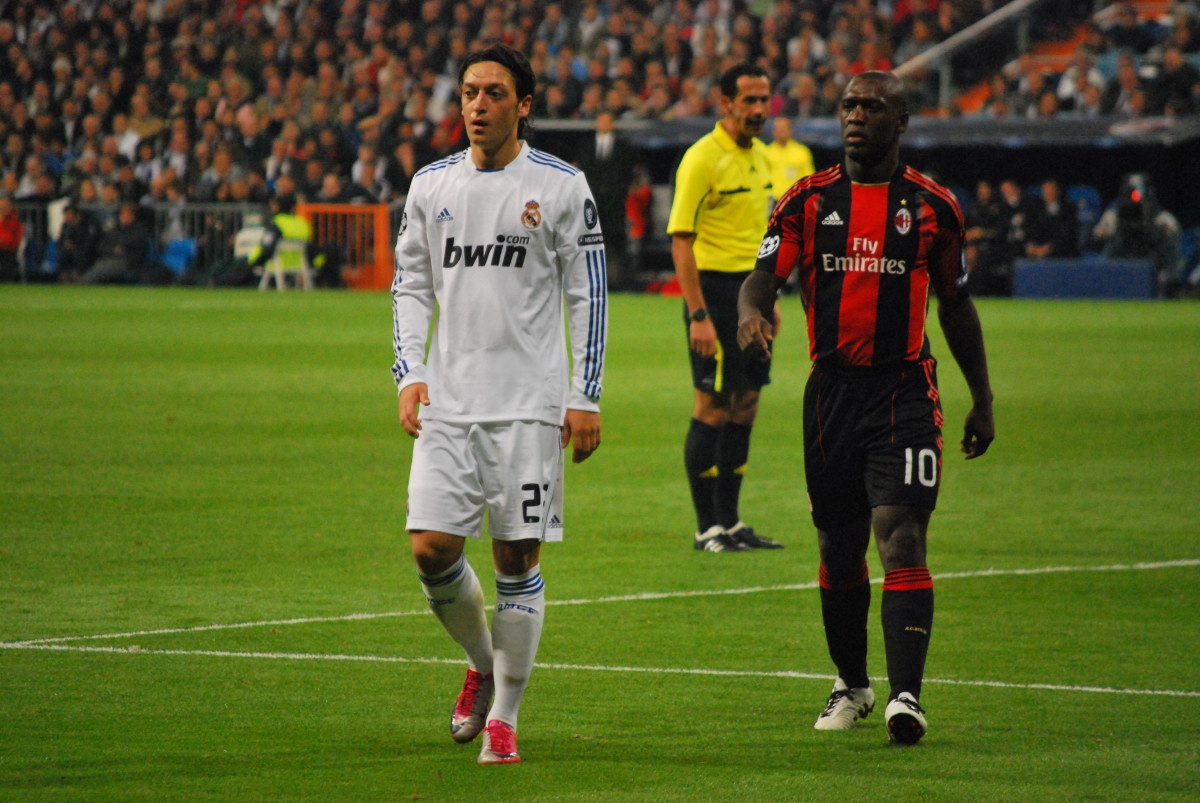
Seedorf playing against former club Real Madrid. On the left is Mesut Özil.

At the end of the 2006–07 season, Seedorf was voted best midfielder of the Champions League. He played his 100th game in the Champions League on 4 December against Celtic.

With Milan, Seedorf formed a formidable midfield partnership with Gennaro Gattuso and Andrea Pirlo, which began since the 2002–03 season. This midfield trio was still used in the starting line-up until the 2011–12 season (Pirlo left the Rossoneri in the summer of 2011), although their form had been declining. Under the guidance of coach Carlo Ancelotti, their role was to support an attacking midfielder, whether it be Rivaldo, Rui Costa, Kaká or Ronaldinho.

Seedorf became the foreigner with the most appearances for Milan following a game against his former club, Sampdoria, which he scored in. At 395 appearances, he passed Nils Liedholm for this historic milestone. During the Sampdoria game, he also became the ninth-highest scoring foreigner for Milan, with 58 goals. On 29 March 2010, Seedorf was the target of racist chants from Lazio fans in a 1–1 draw, which led to the Rome-based club being given a €15,000 fine by the Italian Football Federation (FIGC). This led the Italy's players' union want racism stamped out in Serie A.

Seedorf won his second Scudetto with Milan in the 2010–11 Serie A season, where he once again played a vital role. He scored four goals and made 36 appearances in the 2010–11 season. Seedorf added yet another medal to his trophy cabinet in the first official game of the 2011–12 season, where he played the full 90 minutes in a 2–1 comeback win over rivals Inter Milan in the Supercoppa Italiana. He scored the winning goal of Milan's first win of the 2011–12 Serie A campaign, a 1–0 defeat of Cesena on 24 September.

Seedorf was ranked seventh of the 20 best players of the Champions League, a list which was compiled in 2012 to commemorate the 20th anniversary of the competition. The ranking was done by Champions, the official magazine of UEFA. On 14 May, he said that he was playing his last match with Milan against Novara that day. He also confirmed that he would continue to play football for another club. On 21 June, Seedorf held a press conference announcing his departure from Milan, stating, "I am leaving after 10 wonderful years... I leave a family" after playing for the Rossoneri for a decade and winning two Champions League, two Scudettos and a Coppa Italia. Club CEO Adriano Galliani spoke of Seedorf following the player's departure in the highest regard, stating, "When Milan played well, which happened often, each and every time it occurred Seedorf played an amazing match. He is a world class player."

=== Botafogo ===
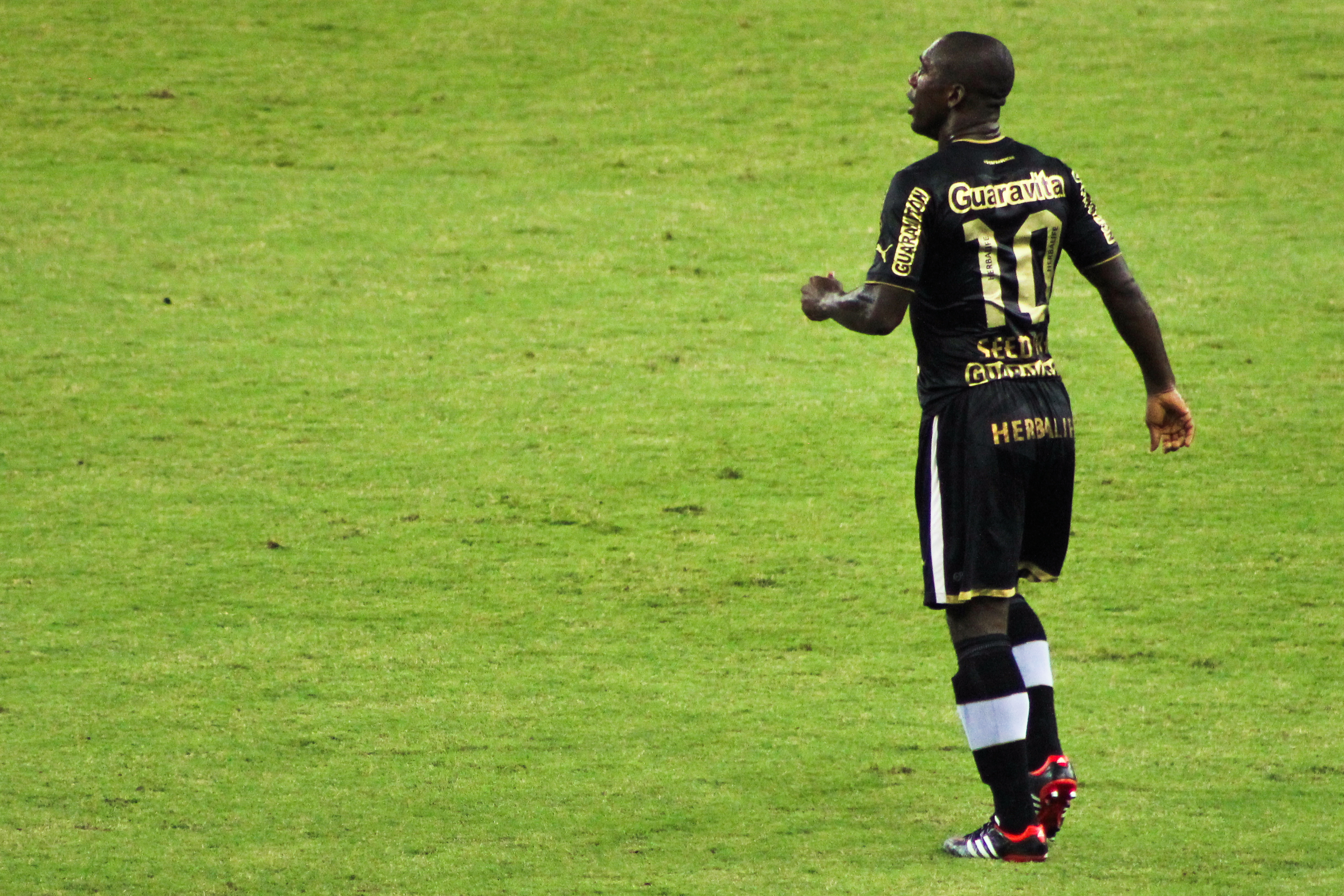
Seedorf playing for Botafogo in 2013

On 30 June 2012, Seedorf signed a two-year contract with Brazilian club Botafogo. The veteran midfielder made his debut with the club on 22 July against Grêmio. On 5 August, Seedorf scored his first goal for Botafogo, curling in a free kick against Atlético Goianiense. On 5 September, Seedorf scored two goals and made an assist against Cruzeiro, helping Botafogo to a 3–1 victory. On 3 February 2013, for the first time on his career, Seedorf scored a hat-trick against Macaé, his first game as a starter that year. Before that game, Seedorf played the second half against Fluminense and made an assist to Bolívar, who scored the match's equalizer.

On 10 March 2013, Seedorf won his first title with Botafogo: the 2013 Taça Guanabara, the first round of 2013 Campeonato Carioca. On 5 May, he won the second round of 2013 Campeonato Carioca – 2013 Taça Rio – against Fluminense. That is also the day of his first official title for Botafogo, the 2013 Campeonato Carioca, as the team won both rounds and no final match was needed. On 6 June, Seedorf scored his 100th goal in domestic league play: 11 with Ajax, 3 with Sampdoria, 15 with Real Madrid, 8 with Inter, 47 with Milan and 16 with Botafogo. On 14 January 2014, Seedorf announced his retirement from professional football. He announced that he is ending his playing career to take up the manager position at Milan following the sacking of Massimiliano Allegri.

== International career ==
Due to Surinamese rules against dual citizenship, players who take Dutch citizenship are no longer eligible to represent the Netherlands' former colony. He received his first callup on 14 December 1994 at the age of 18 against Luxembourg. Seedorf scored on his debut, helping his team to a 5–0 victory in a UEFA Euro 1996 qualifying match.

Seedorf was in the Dutch squad for the UEFA European Championships in 1996, where his penalty miss proved decisive in the quarter-final shootout defeat to France. He also appeared for the Netherlands at Euro 2000 and 2004, as well as the 1998 FIFA World Cup, reaching the semi-finals in all three of these tournaments.

On 12 November 2006, Seedorf was recalled for the first time since June 2004 as a replacement for the injured Wesley Sneijder. He started and played the full 90 minutes in a 1–1 friendly draw against England. Seedorf won the last of his 87 caps for the Netherlands in 2007. In the Euro 2008 qualifiers against Romania (0–0 at home) and Slovenia (1–0 away win), Seedorf played four and six minutes respectively. There were doubts on his position within the national team, as Marco van Basten favoured younger players such as Rafael van der Vaart, Wesley Sneijder and Robin van Persie. On 13 May 2008, Seedorf announced that he would not take part in UEFA Euro 2008 due to his ongoing personal conflict with van Basten.

== Style of play ==
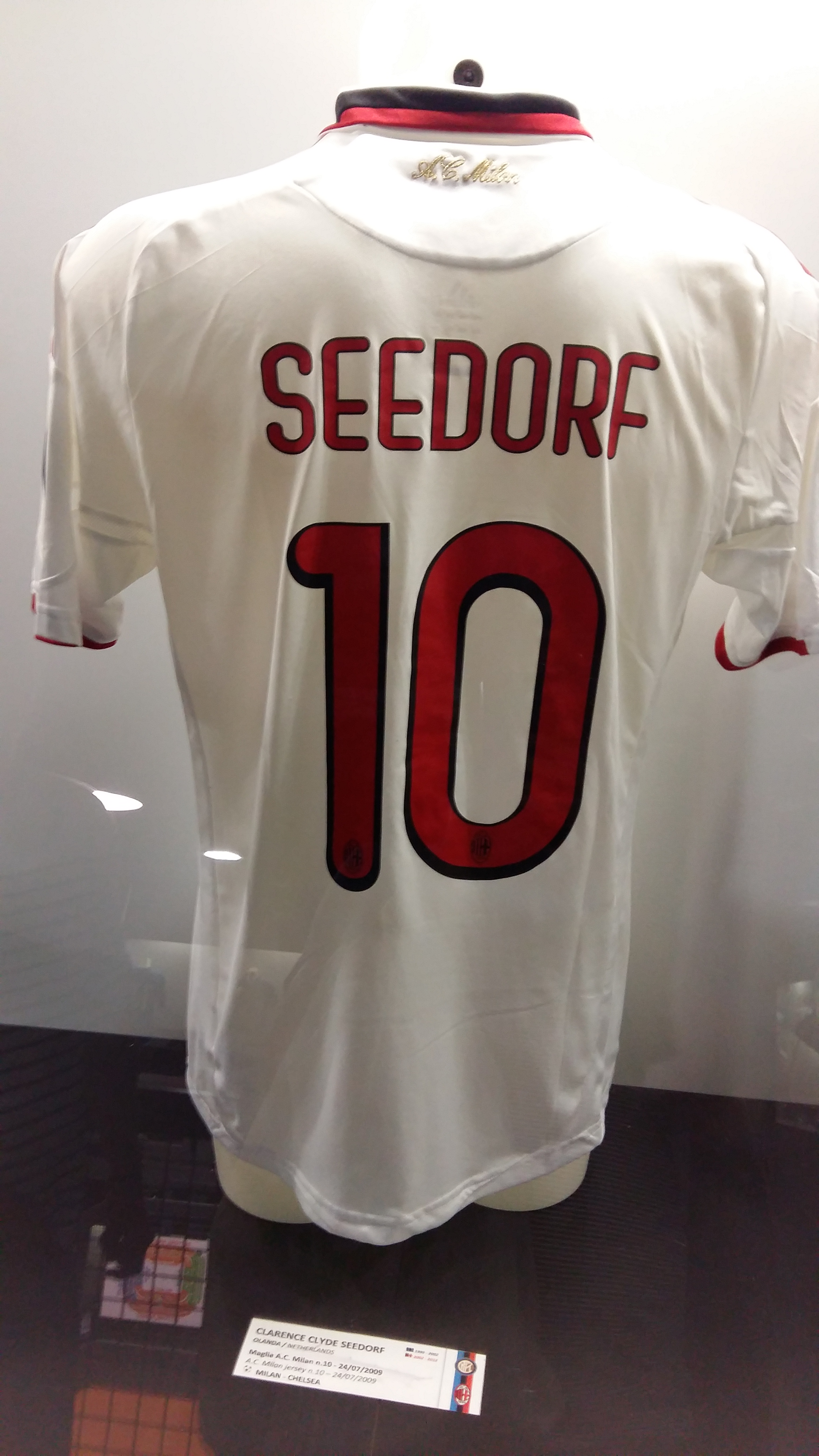
Seedorf's number 10 Milan jersey in the San Siro museum

Nicknamed "Il Professore" and "Willy Wonka", Seedorf is widely considered one of the best midfielders of his generation. He is considered to have been a well-rounded player with high strength, pace and stamina, allowing him to play anywhere in the midfield and contribute both offensively and defensively. While he primarily served as a playmaker in the centre, he was also deployed as an attacking midfielder, on the wing, as a mezzala, or in a holding or box-to-box role.

In addition to his physical attributes and skill as a defender, he was an excellent dribbler who could retain possession under pressure, crossing the ball off to on-rushing teammates with impressive accuracy. Seedorf was also a successful free kicker and capable of scoring goals from distance with either foot. Despite his physical style of play, Seedorf was regarded as a player with good behavior, having been sent off only two times in his career. He has also been praised for his longevity on the field.

== Managerial career ==
Seedorf was appointed the new head coach of Milan on 16 January 2014, terminating his contract with Botafogo early in order to take on the managerial role, with Milan languishing in 11th in the Serie A table. On 19 January, he won his first managerial match, played against Hellas Verona, with Mario Balotelli scoring the lone goal of the game.

Despite overseeing the club's first five-match winning run since 2011, and first Serie A victory in the Milan derby against Inter since 2011, Seedorf was dismissed by Milan on 9 June 2014 after just four months on the job, with Filippo Inzaghi being named as his successor. During the Dutchman's time at the helm of the club, Milan gained a total of 35 out of a possible 57 points - the fourth-most out of all Serie A sides (one less than Napoli's corresponding total and six less than Roma's).

Seedorf was appointed manager of China League One team Shenzhen FC in July 2016, but was replaced five months later by Sven-Göran Eriksson. A year later Seedorf joined Brazilian club Atlético Paranaense as both a coach and a sporting director. Within a month the deal was cancelled after both parties failed to reach an agreement. In February 2018, Seedorf was appointed as manager of Spanish club Deportivo La Coruña for the remainder of the 2017–18 season. Seedorf led the team to just two wins in sixteen matches, Deportivo were relegated from La Liga, and at the end of the season he left the club.

After a deal with Sven-Göran Eriksson could not be agreed, the Fédération Camerounaise de Football appointed Seedorf as the manager of the Cameroon national team in August 2018. He was joined by former teammate Patrick Kluivert as his assistant manager. However, after a disappointing 2019 Africa Cup of Nations, where Cameroon as defending champions were eliminated by Nigeria in the round of 16 after an unimpressive group stage, he was sacked in July 2019.

On 11 October 2026, Seedorf agreed to become the head coach of Corinthians, replacing Fernando Diniz.

== Personal life and other work ==
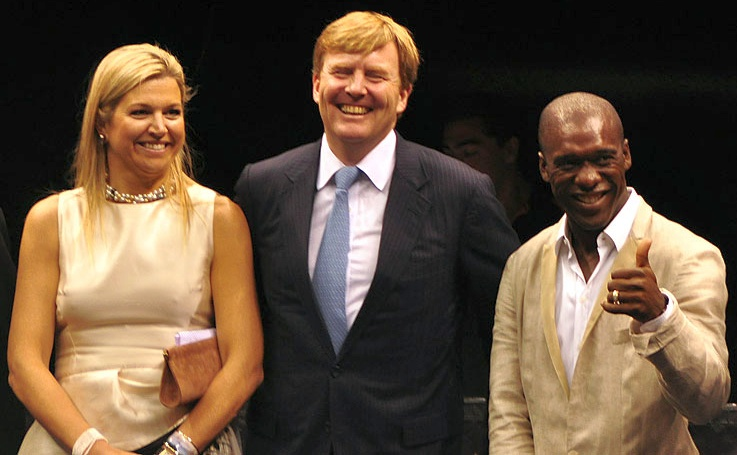
Seedorf with Queen Máxima and King Willem-Alexander of the Netherlands.

Seedorf speaks six languages fluently: Dutch, English, Italian, Portuguese, Spanish and Sranan Tongo. He was often seen as a spiritual, intelligent and articulate figure in football, and in a 2011 interview, Seedorf stated that he was studying to obtain a master's degree in business at the prestigious Bocconi University in Milan; because of this, he earned the nickname "il professore" ("the professor") during his time playing at Milan. Seedorf married a Brazilian woman, Luviana Seedorf, with whom he owns a restaurant called Finger's in Milan. They have four children. After separating from his wife, he began a relationship with Canadian-Iranian Sophia Makramati, and converted to her faith of Islam in a March 2022 ceremony in Dubai.

Seedorf has dabbled in media-related work during recent years. In 2009, he worked with The New York Times to run a column entitled "Seedorf responds", where once a month he would answer peoples' questions regarding football. He joined the BBC's team covering the 2010 FIFA World Cup in South Africa, working as a television pundit. He also presented a number of features for the BBC coverage, including one about Robben Island. He joined the BBC for their Match of the Day Live coverage of UEFA Euro 2012. He has also made appearances on Match of the Day 2 during the English football league season.

Because of his strong connection with the country Suriname, where he was born, he is involved in many social development projects there. He built his own Clarence Seedorf Stadium in the district of Para in Suriname. In this stadium, the Para Juniors League of Suriname is being held and the teams of the Suri Profs & SV The Brothers play there regularly. With his Champions for Children Foundation, he supports projects for good causes in Suriname. For this, Suriname has honoured him to Commander of the High-Order of the Yellow Star, and in 2011 he was invested as a Knight of the Order of Orange-Nassau (OON).

In 2012 and 2014, Seedorf took part in Soccer Aid, a charity match at Old Trafford with former professional players and celebrities. He played for "The Rest of the World" team against England. In 2014, he scored a hat-trick, where The Rest of the World won 4–2; they raised over £4 million in total.

On 13 May 2025, Seedorf became a sports advisor at Iranian giants Esteghlal.

Clarence's nephew, Collin Seedorf, is also a professional footballer, and currently plays for Bosnian club Željezničar.

== Career statistics ==
=== Club ===
Appearances and goals by club, season and competition
Club	Season	League			National cup (Note: Includes KNVB Cup, Coppa Italia, Copa del Rey, Copa do Brasil)		Continental		Other		Total	
Club	Season	Division	Apps	Goals	Apps	Goals	Apps	Goals	Apps	Goals	Apps	Goals
Ajax	1992–93	Eredivisie	12	1	3	0	3 (Note: Appearances in UEFA Cup)	0	–		18	1
Ajax	1993–94	Eredivisie	19	4	2	0	2 (Note: Appearances in UEFA Cup Winners' Cup)	0	1 (Note: Appearance in Dutch Supercup)	0	24	4
Ajax	1994–95	Eredivisie	34	6	3	0	11 (Note: Appearances in UEFA Champions League)	0	1	0	49	6
Ajax	Total		65	11	8	0	16	0	2	0	91	11
Sampdoria	1995–96	Serie A	32	3	2	1	–				34	4
Real Madrid	1996–97	La Liga	38	6	4	0	–				42	6
Real Madrid	1997–98	La Liga	36	6	0	0	11	0	2 (Note: Appearances in Supercopa de España)	1	49	7
Real Madrid	1998–99	La Liga	37	3	5	1	8	3	2 (Note: One appearance in UEFA Super Cup, one appearance in Intercontinental Cup)	0	52	7
Real Madrid	1999–2000	La Liga	10	0	0	0	6	0	0	0	16	0
Real Madrid	Total		121	15	9	1	25	3	4	1	159	20
Inter Milan	1999–2000	Serie A	20	3	5	2	–				25	5
Inter Milan	2000–01	Serie A	24	2	4	0	7 (Note: Two appearances in UEFA Champions League, five appearances and three goals in UEFA Cup)	3	1 (Note: Appearance in Supercoppa Italiana)	0	36	5
Inter Milan	2001–02	Serie A	20	3	2	1	10	0	–		32	4
Inter Milan	Total		64	8	11	3	17	3	1	0	93	14
AC Milan	2002–03	Serie A	29	4	3	2	16	1	–		48	7
AC Milan	2003–04	Serie A	29	3	5	0	8	0	3 (Note: One appearance in Supercoppa Italiana, one appearance in UEFA Super Cup, one appearance in Intercontinental Cup)	0	45	3
AC Milan	2004–05	Serie A	32	5	4	1	13	1	0	0	49	7
AC Milan	2005–06	Serie A	36	4	2	1	11	1	–		49	6
AC Milan	2006–07	Serie A	32	7	5	0	14	3	–		51	10
AC Milan	2007–08	Serie A	32	7	0	0	7	2	3 (Note: One appearance in UEFA Super Cup, two appearances and one goal in FIFA Club World Cup)	1	42	10
AC Milan	2008–09	Serie A	33	6	1	0	7	0	–		41	6
AC Milan	2009–10	Serie A	29	5	0	0	8	1	–		37	6
AC Milan	2010–11	Serie A	30	4	2	0	8	0	–		40	4
AC Milan	2011–12	Serie A	18	2	3	1	8	0	1	0	30	3
AC Milan	Total		300	47	25	5	100	9	7	1	432	62
Botafogo	2012	Série A	24	8	0	0	1	1	0	0	25	9
Botafogo	2013	Série A	34	8	8	0	0	0	14 (Note: Fourteen appearances and seven goals in the Campeonato Carioca.)	7	56	15
Botafogo	Total		58	16	8	0	1	1	14	7	81	24
Career total			640	100	57	7	159	16	28	9	890	135

=== International ===
Appearances and goals by national team and year
National team	Year	Apps	Goals
Netherlands	1994	1	1
Netherlands	1995	7	3
Netherlands	1996	11	2
Netherlands	1997	7	0
Netherlands	1998	12	1
Netherlands	1999	7	0
Netherlands	2000	10	2
Netherlands	2001	4	1
Netherlands	2002	2	1
Netherlands	2003	7	0
Netherlands	2004	9	0
Netherlands	2005	0	0
Netherlands	2006	1	0
Netherlands	2007	8	0
Netherlands	2008	1	0
Total		87	11

Scores and results list the Netherlands' goal tally first, score column indicates score after each Seedorf goal.

List of international goals scored by Clarence Seedorf
No.	Date	Venue	Opponent	Score	Result	Competition
1	14 December 1994	De Kuip, Rotterdam	Luxembourg	5–0	5–0	UEFA Euro 1996 qualifying
2	29 March 1995	De Kuip, Rotterdam	Malta	1–0	4–0	UEFA Euro 1996 qualifying
3	11 October 1995	Ta' Qali National Stadium, Attard	Malta	4–0	4–0	UEFA Euro 1996 qualifying
4	15 November 1995	De Kuip, Rotterdam	Norway	1–0	3–0	UEFA Euro 1996 qualifying
5	4 June 1996	De Kuip, Rotterdam	Republic of Ireland	2–1	3–1	Friendly
6	14 December 1996	King Baudouin Stadium, Brussels	Belgium	2–0	3–0	1998 FIFA World Cup qualification
7	21 February 1998	Orange Bowl, Miami	United States	2–0	2–0	Friendly
8	7 October 2000	GSP Stadium, Nicosia	Cyprus	1–0	4–0	2002 FIFA World Cup qualification
9	7 October 2000	GSP Stadium, Nicosia	Cyprus	2–0	4–0	2002 FIFA World Cup qualification
10	6 October 2001	GelreDome, Arnhem	Andorra	2–0	4–0	2002 FIFA World Cup qualification
11	16 October 2002	Ernst-Happel-Stadion, Vienna	Austria	1–0	3–0	UEFA Euro 2004 qualifying

== Managerial statistics ==
As of 18 November 2026

Team	From	To	Record							
Team	From	To	G	W	D	L	GF	GA	GD	Win %
AC Milan	16 January 2014	9 June 2014	22	11	2	9	28	26	+2	50.00
Shenzhen FC	7 July 2016	5 December 2016	14	4	4	6	17	24	−7	28.57
Deportivo La Coruña	5 February 2018	22 May 2018	16	2	6	8	14	25	−11	12.50
Cameroon	4 August 2018	16 July 2019	13	4	5	4	10	11	−1	30.77
Corinthians	11 October 2026	Present	4	2	1	1	8	3	+5	50.00
Total			69	23	18	28	77	89	−12	33.33

== Honours ==
Ajax

- Eredivisie: 1993–94, 1994–95
- KNVB Cup: 1992–93
- Johan Cruijff Shield: 1993
- UEFA Champions League: 1994–95

Real Madrid

- La Liga: 1996–97
- Supercopa de España: 1997
- UEFA Champions League: 1997–98
- Intercontinental Cup: 1998

AC Milan

- Serie A: 2003–04, 2010–11
- Coppa Italia: 2002–03
- Supercoppa Italiana: 2011
- UEFA Champions League: 2002–03, 2006–07
- UEFA Super Cup: 2003, 2007
- FIFA Club World Cup: 2007

Botafogo

- Campeonato Carioca: 2013

Individual

- Dutch Football Talent of the Year: 1993, 1994
- ESM Team of the Year: 1996–97
- UEFA Team of the Year: 2002, 2007
- UEFA Best Midfielder Award: 2006–07
- UEFA Champions League Squad of the Season: 2006–07
- FIFA Club World Cup Silver Ball: 2007
- FIFPro World XI Nominee: 2007
- Real Madrid Team of the Century: 2008
- Bola de Prata: 2013
- Knight of the Order of Orange-Nassau
- Commander of the Honorary Order of the Yellow Star
- Nelson Mandela Legacy Champion
- FIFA 100
- AC Milan Hall of Fame
- Golden Foot Award Legends: 2018

== See also ==
- List of footballers who won the UEFA Champions League with more than one club
- List of footballers with 100 or more UEFA Champions League appearances
- List of people named in the Panama Papers
