= Pearl Amoah =

Ghanaian international model

Pearl Amoah is a Ghanaian former model and beauty pageant titleholder. She is currently ordained minister. She was Miss Northern Region in 1994, Miss Ghana Universe in 1996 and the Miss Ghana International pageant in 2015. She also won the Africa Ebony model of the year in 1999.In 2000 she was given the best choreographer of the millennium award at the Millennium Excellency Awards.She has modeled in the United States, Paris, London, Germany, Ivory Coast and Ghana.

== Initiatives ==
She established PAF Outlet, the first boutique solely dedicated to Ghanaian fashion brands. In 1999 she set up Fashion House. She also has PearlProjects to showcase her creativity and design prowess. She introduced the Ghana Fashion Week in 2001. It is organized every year for elite fashion designers in Africa to converge and appreciate their craft. She launched her own line Pearl in 2004. Later that same year, she joined forces with JP Miller and the JosephPearl brand was launched. The following year, their first boutique was opened in Soho, New York.

== Career in modeling ==
She has modeled for fashion brands like Roberto Cavalli, Vivien Westwood, Halston, Donna Karen, Alberta Ferreti, Ralph Rucci, Jakie Rogers, Armani, Valentino and others. She has been shot by photographers such as Peter Lindberg, Dewy Nicks, Marco Glaviano, Frank Otten and Gean-Luca for various magazines like Vibe, Paris Voici, Essence, Black Elegance, Marie Claire, Cosmopolitan, and Cosmo Girl.

== Education ==
She had her secondary education at the Labone Senior High School. Her bachelor's degree which is in Hospitality Management, is from Westbourne University in London. She also has a diploma in Architecture & Interior Design from Parsons School of Design in New York.

== Personal life ==
She hails from La in Accra and is the only child of her mother the late Madam Bernice Adjeley Adjei. She got married in 2008 to Mac Diamond Kodjo Emekor Nyamekor and has three children.
