= List of footballers who won the UEFA Champions League with more than one club =

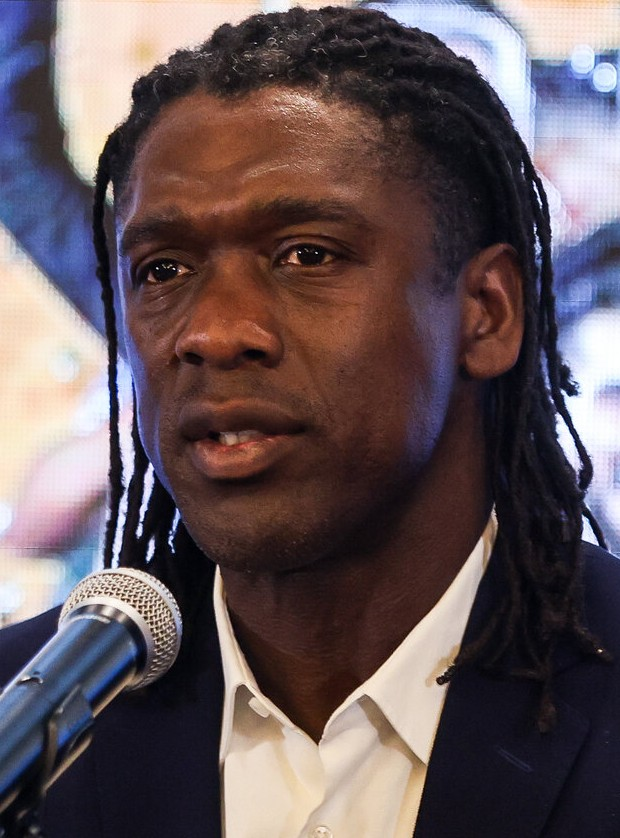
Clarence Seedorf is the only player to win the Champions League with three clubs.

Since the rebranding of the European Champion Clubs' Cup to UEFA Champions League in 1992 at the start of the 1992–93 season, a total of 27 players have won the tournament with more than one club. The first player to do so was Marcel Desailly, who won it with Marseille in 1993 and AC Milan the following year, while the most recent is Achraf Hakimi, who won with Real Madrid in 2018 and Paris Saint-Germain in 2025.

Clarence Seedorf is the only player to win the Champions League with three clubs. He won it with Ajax in 1995, Real Madrid in 1998, and then was victorious twice with AC Milan, first in 2003 and then again in 2007.

Desailly is also one of four players to win the trophy with two clubs in consecutive years, alongside Paulo Sousa (Juventus in 1996 and Borussia Dortmund in 1997), Gerard Piqué (Manchester United in 2008 and Barcelona in 2009) and Samuel Eto'o (Barcelona in 2009 and Inter Milan in 2010).

Edwin van der Sar's two Champions League titles came 13 years apart (Ajax in 1995 and Manchester United in 2008), which was the longest gap between wins in the competition for any player until Scott Carson won with Manchester City in 2023, eighteen years after his first win with Liverpool in 2005.

Carson is also one of three players on this list who never played in a Champions League final. The others are Daniel Sturridge (Chelsea in 2012 and Liverpool in 2019) and Xherdan Shaqiri (2013 with Bayern Munich and 2019 with Liverpool).

== Players ==
Player	Nation	Victories	Clubs	Clubs (years)
Toni Kroos	Germany	6	2	Bayern Munich (2013), Real Madrid (2016, 2017, 2018, 2022, 2024)
Cristiano Ronaldo	Portugal	5	2	Manchester United (2008), Real Madrid (2014, 2016, 2017, 2018)
Clarence Seedorf	Netherlands	4	3	Ajax (1995), Real Madrid (1998), AC Milan (2003, 2007)
Gerard Piqué	Spain	4	2	Manchester United (2008), Barcelona (2009, 2011, 2015)
Mateo Kovačić	Croatia	4	2	Real Madrid (2016, 2017, 2018), Chelsea (2021)
David Alaba	Austria	4	2	Bayern Munich (2013, 2020), Real Madrid (2022, 2024)
Fernando Redondo	Argentina	3	2	Real Madrid (1998, 2000), AC Milan (2003)
Samuel Eto'o	Cameroon	3	2	Barcelona (2006, 2009), Inter Milan (2010)
Achraf Hakimi	Morocco	3	2	Real Madrid (2018), Paris Saint-Germain (2025, 2026)
Lucas Hernandez	France	3	2	Bayern Munich (2020), Paris Saint-Germain (2025, 2026)
Marcel Desailly	France	2	2	Marseille (1993), AC Milan (1994)
Didier Deschamps	France	2	2	Marseille (1993), Juventus (1996)
Paulo Sousa	Portugal	2	2	Juventus (1996), Borussia Dortmund (1997)
Christian Panucci	Italy	2	2	AC Milan (1994), Real Madrid (1998)
Deco	Portugal	2	2	Porto (2004), Barcelona (2006)
Edwin van der Sar	Netherlands	2	2	Ajax (1995), Manchester United (2008)
Owen Hargreaves	England	2	2	Bayern Munich (2001), Manchester United (2008)
Thiago Motta	Italy	2	2	Barcelona (2006), Inter Milan (2010)
José Bosingwa	Portugal	2	2	Porto (2004), Chelsea (2012)
Paulo Ferreira	Portugal	2	2	Porto (2004), Chelsea (2012)
Xabi Alonso	Spain	2	2	Liverpool (2005), Real Madrid (2014)
Daniel Sturridge	England	2	2	Chelsea (2012), Liverpool (2019)
Xherdan Shaqiri	Switzerland	2	2	Bayern Munich (2013), Liverpool (2019)
Thiago Alcântara	Spain	2	2	Barcelona (2011), Bayern Munich (2020)
Scott Carson	England	2	2	Liverpool (2005), Manchester City (2023)
Antonio Rüdiger	Germany	2	2	Chelsea (2021), Real Madrid (2024)
Kepa Arrizabalaga	Spain	2	2	Chelsea (2021), Real Madrid (2024)
