= Emmanuel Wayo =

Wayo
- Born: Emmanuel Wayo; Nima, Ghana
- Genres: hip hop, Afro-Tech
- Occupations: Rapper; songwriter; Entrepreneur; performer
- Years active: 2004–present
- Label: D-Lane Records

Emmanuel Wayo (born December 7) professionally known as Wayo is a hip-hop and afro-tech artist. Wayo is a recording artist born in Nima, Accra. He rose to fame in 2004 when he went by the stage name D-Lane in the Wonda World rap group. In March 2018, his single Muscatella was declared number one in Ghana by Ghud Music. He was also on Ghanaian based radio station Live Fm's top 10 songs three times. In November of that year also, Muscatella again was featured as 'Song of the week' by American broadcasting network, VoA on their 'Music time in Africa' show

== Life and career ==
Wayo, the second of three children was born in Nima, Accra to the late Tookid Kwadjo Wayo and Judith Emden, and was later raised by controversial Ghanaian politician Kofi Wayo after his father's death Wayo got exposed to music at the age of 7 watching 'Yo MTV' back in Achimota primary school. He later proceeded to Labone Senior High School where he continued writing and performing music with his friend Kalala.They performed on rap shows across town and in school. It was through this they met Scientific and Cheddah, and later went on to form the rap group Wonda World. They built a studio and established 'Wonda World Records' which hosted the likes Jayso and D Black. He worked with producers such as EL, Richie and Jayso. In 2008, Wayo and his group members dissolved Wonda World. He came back in 2012 to release his debut three track EP called 'Real Talk' which had guest appearances from D-Black and M.anifest, he also got featured on a number of tracks such as 'Keep pushing' by rapper 'Scientific' In 2017 he released Call Me In 2018 he released two additional singles 'Muscatella' featuring Joey B and 'Champion Banana'

== Music style ==
He adds pidgin and krobo from his native tongue to his lyrics.

== Personal life ==
Wayo is married with three children, who he prefers to keep away from the public eye.

== Discography ==
Real Talk
