= Augustine Tawiah =

Ghanaian politician

Hon Augustine Tawiah
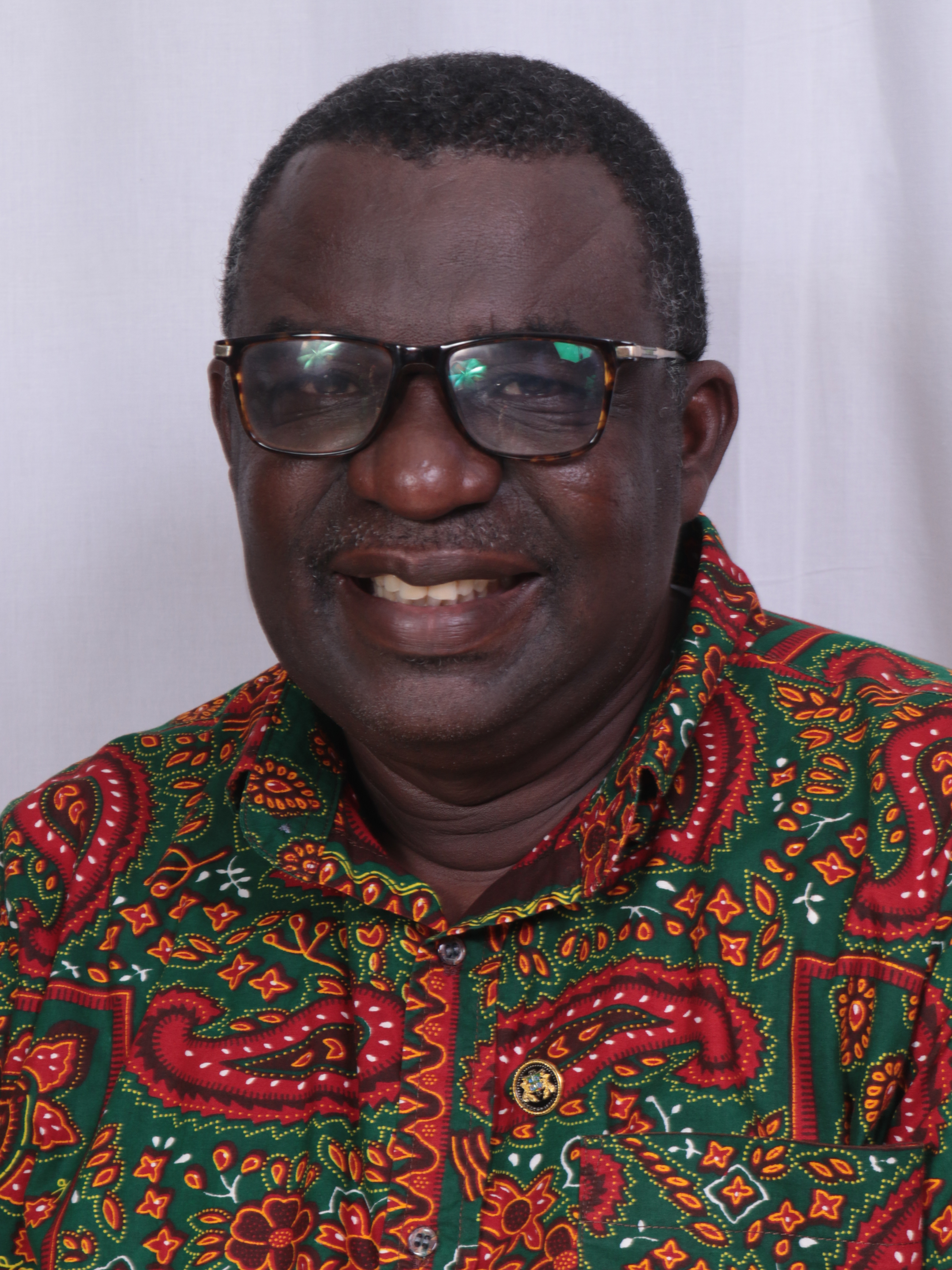

Member of the Ghana Parliament for Bia West
- Incumbent
- Assumed office 7 January 2021

Personal details
- Born: Augustine Tawiah; 27 September 1961 (age 64) Sefwi Asuopiri
- Party: National Democratic Congress
- Occupation: Politician
- Committees: Members Holding Offices of Profit Committee, Education Committee

Augustine Tawiah (born 27 September 1961) is a Ghanaian politician and member of the Seventh Parliament of the Fourth Republic of Ghana representing the Bia West Constituency in the Western North Region on the ticket of the National Democratic Congress.

== Early life ==
Augustine Tawiah hails from Sefwi Asuopiri in the Western Region

== Education ==
Augustine Tawiah started his basic school in the Bia District in the current Western North Region, Ghana. He then passed his common entrance exams to be able to go to Secondary School. The Secondary School Augustine Tawiah attended are St. Thomas Aquinas Senior High School (SHS Ordinary Level) and later at Labone Senior High School (SHS Advanced Level).

Augustine Tawiah gained Doctor of Ministry (Applied Theology) in 2006, Doctor of Education Certificate (Leadership and Policy Studies) in 2009, Master of Theology, a Master of Science from the University of Memphis as well as a Certificate in University Teaching. Augustine Tawiah also has a Doctor of Ministry from Harding University, a Master of Arts from Lipscomb University, and a Cert-Hr Training from the University of Oklahoma.

== Career and Positions ==
Augustine Tawiah works at the Parliament of Ghana as a Member of Parliament (MP). He is a Lecturer and Consultant at Ghana Institute of Management and Public Administration (GIMPA). He held the position as the Executive Secretary for the National Teaching Council in Ghana and also the Academic Dean at Ghana Christian University College.

== Politics ==
Augustine Tawiah is the Member of Parliament (MP) for Bia West Constituency in the Western North Region.

== Personal life ==
Augustine Tawiah is a Christian and attends Church of Christ.
