= De kabel =

De kabel (English: The cable) is a nickname for a group of five Afro-Dutch association footballers of Surinamese descent, who at the time played for Dutch football club AFC Ajax and for the Netherlands national team. The term originated in the media following an alleged rift between players of the national team during the 1996 European Football Championship.

The members of the cable, as mentioned in the media were as follows:

- Winston Bogarde
- Edgar Davids
- Patrick Kluivert
- Michael Reiziger
- Clarence Seedorf

The name arose during an interview on the TV show Barend en Van Dorp, where Davids, Kluivert and Seedorf were present. This was where the term 'kabel' was first mentioned to describe the friendship between the three. During the 1996 UEFA Euro the term was then taken over to describe the aforementioned quintet.

== Origin ==
The reason for the widespread attention to 'the cable' came after the second group match of the European Championship against Switzerland. Clarence Seedorf started this game as libero in defense. But because the Swiss played in a different formation than expected, Seedorf accidentally slipped into a role as an end-marker. After several fouls were necessitated to stop his direct opponent, thus suffering a yellow card, head coach Guus Hiddink decided to substitute him off in the 26'-minute. Edgar Davids, who was on the bench at the time, reacted aggressively towards Hiddink's decision. After the match, he expressed his discontent with harsh criticism over Hiddink towards a Swiss journalist, stating that Hiddink was listening to certain players too much (referring specifically to Danny Blind and Ronald de Boer by name). Hiddink "must get his head out of players' asses so he can see better" according to Davids. After the brief interview, Hiddink decided to waive Davids, whereby he would no longer participate in the remainder of the tournament.

Furthermore a photograph which was released by the NOS circulated, where the public believed the five aforementioned players were living in discord with the rest of the selection. The media reported that the picture showed the five players sitting apart from the rest of the group at a separate table during breakfast. This however was not correct. Bogarde, Kluivert and Seedorf sat together at the same table, Davids and Reiziger not. The others who were sitting at the table were John Veldman, Aron Winter and the white Rob Witschge. Patrick Kluivert indicated in his biography that the table order changed every day, and that there were no permanent seats. The media never focused on the fact that five reverse (white) Dutch players would sit together separately.

After Edgar Davids was sent home from the tournament, the remaining four players remained, playing in the final group match, as well as the quarter-final match against France where the Dutch were eliminated. The developments surrounding the affair with the photograph and the media caused a disturbed relationship amongst the players in the national team, the public and the five players known as 'the cabal' whereby Seedorf to date is still widely excluded.

== Background ==
In the beginning stages very little information surfaced regarding the matter, but years later the altercation was clarified by several of the players who were involved. The cause for the immense tension amongst the players was largely due to salary and power differences at Ajax. This was first brought to light by Bogarde in March 2006 during the airing of the TV show Profiel. It was later confirmed in May 2008 on another show Andere Tijden Sport. Maarten Oldenhof, commercial manager at Ajax at the time, confirmed that there were indeed big salary differences at the time. Danny Blind for example earned six times the amount of club top scorer Kluivert in 1996. Bogarde also expressed that the power differences amongst the team frustrated him greatly. Certain players such as Ronald and Frank de Boer and Danny Blind would consult with the Board on how much their teammates should earn, including 'the cable' players, helping to determine their salary. Ronald de Boer admitted on Andere Tijden that they had in fact called for a higher salary for these players, and that the discontent was created when some players had control over the rest of the selection. He also indicated that a lot of the dissatisfaction was revealed during the European Championship after the match against Switzerland, when Guus Hiddink left the players to themselves in the locker room to settle their differences.

== Post-Euro 1996 ==
Guus Hiddink remained head coach of the national team for two more years. He settled his differences with Edgar Davids, and all cable players stayed playing for the Netherlands, and were all present at the 1998 FIFA World Cup. There were no more noteworthy incidents after the European Championship surrounding the Dutch national team. Team captain Frank de Boer called the teams from '98 and 2000 a "very close group" in an episode of Voetbal International in May 2008.

== Croky-affaire ==
Meanwhile at Ajax there was still one more incident which Kluivert dubbed as the "Croky affair". During the 1996–97 season, Blind and the De Boer twins arranged a sponsorship deal with a Dutch brand of potato chips Croky, without the knowledge of the rest of the selection. The agreement consisted of creating Pogs of the Ajax players, which yielded ƒ500,000 guilders. The proceeds would be distributed over the entire selection. Bogarde, Kluivert and Veldman (who was never identified as a member of the kabel through the media) refused to sign, so the action was threatening to be cancelled. Bogarde gave this as another example of the uneven power distribution amongst the players, since the opinion of the squad was never asked, after consultation the three remaining players signed on and the Croky deal came to fruition.

Clarence Seedorf had already left the club in 1995, after which Kluivert and Bogarde departed in the Summer of '97 as the last of the Kabel players at Ajax, with Davids and Reiziger having left the club a year prior.

== Bibliography ==
- (in Dutch) Mike Verweij, Kluivert, House of Knowledge, Schelluinen, 2006, ISBN 978-90-8510-243-4
- (in Dutch) Marcel Rözer, Winston Bogarde: Deze neger buigt voor niemand , Houtekiet, Purmerend, 2005, ISBN 90-5240-859-9
