= Jemima Nartey =

Jemima Nartemle Nartey of Accra, Ghana was 2017 to 2021 Vice-Chair and one of 12 elected volunteer members of the World Scout Committee, the main executive body of the World Organization of the Scout Movement.

== Education ==
An alumnus of Labone Senior High School, Jemima studied Women and Gender Studies at the Ghana Institute of Management and Public Administration, Public Relations at the Ghana Institute of Journalism, and French at Mount Mary College of Education, Somanya, Ghana.

== Career ==
In 2017, she was elected as First Vice Chairperson of the World Organisation of the Scout Movement at the 41st World Scout Conference in Baku, Azerbaijan. She occupied this position until 2021. With over 25 years as an educationist, Jemima Nartey founded and is the Chief Executive Officer (CEO) of Happy Kids Schools.

== Awards & Recognitions ==
Former Deputy Chief Commissioner at the Ghana Scout Association, Jemima was awarded the Silver World Award, a distinguished service award of the Boy Scouts of America (BSA) in 2018.

She was inducted in 2018 as a member of the Seed Transformation Network Ghana, under the Stanford Seed Transformation Program.

In 2022, Jemima was awarded the 382nd Bronze Wolf, the only distinction of the World Organization of the Scout Movement, awarded by the World Scout Committee for exceptional services to world Scouting.
