= Labone, Accra =

Labone District
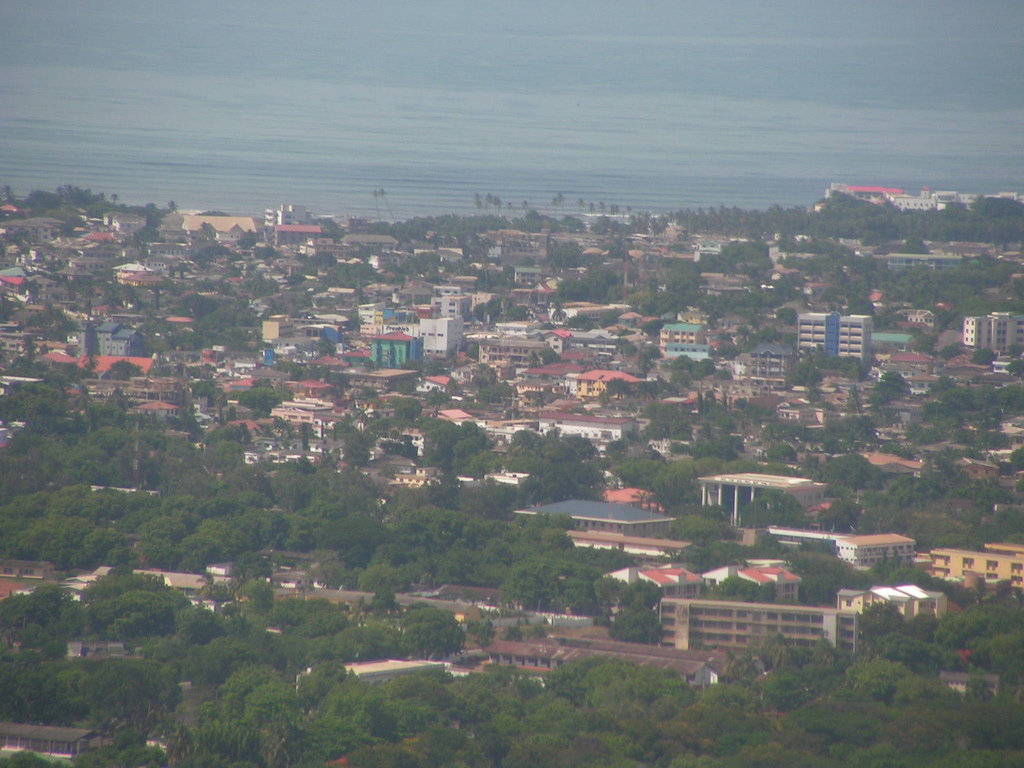
- Interactive map of Labone District
- Location: Roughly: W: Cantonments Road; S: Ring Road East/Labadi Road; Castle Road; N: Fourth Circular Road/Sixth Circular Road; E: Labadi Crescent

Site notes
- Governing body: Accra Metropolitan Assembly

Labone is a district of Accra, Ghana bounded to the south by Labadi Road. Cantonments Road serves as the district's western boundary, while Labadi Crescent is the eastern boundary. The Ring road separates Labone from the southern district of Osu.

As an extension of touristy Osu, Labone offers a mix of houses dating from the early 20th century. Unlike Osu, however, Labone remains largely residential albeit with the siting of some embassies and corporate headquarters in the district.

It was ranked number 10 in "Time Out’s Top 10 Coolest Neighborhoods for 2025".

== Landmarks/places of interest ==
- Labone Coffee shop
- Labone Senior High School
- South African Embassy
