= Bia West (Ghana parliament constituency) =

Parliamentary constituency in Ghana

- constituency for the Parliament of Ghana
- District: Bia West District
- Region: Western North Region of Ghana

Current constituency
- Party: National Democratic Congress
- MP: Augustine Tawiah

Bia West is one of the constituencies represented in the Parliament of Ghana. It elects one Member of Parliament (MP) by the first past the post system of election. Bia West is located in the Bia District of the Western North Region of Ghana.

== Members of Parliament ==
Election	Member	Party
2016	Augustine Tawiah	National Democratic Congress
