= Hello FM (Ghana) =

Radio station in Accra, Ghana

- Kumasi; Ghana
- Broadcast area: Ghana
- Frequency: 101.5 MHz,

Programming
- Languages: Twi, English
- Format: news, community information & african entertainment

Ownership
- Owner: Despite Group of Companies Sampson Kwame Nyamekye, General Manager.
- Sister stations: Okay FM, Peace FM (Ghana), Neat FM, UTV Ghana

Links
- Website: HelloFMOnline.com

Hello FM is a privately owned local radio station based in Kumasi, Ghana. It broadcasts news as well as talk programmes with a strong music and entertainment input. It is one of stations that is ultimately run by the Despite Group of Companies. The station is both active on 101.5fm and online. The station is one of few stations owned and run by the media group company Despite Group of Companies. The station focus on playing African Music and foreign musical genres.

== Notable personalities ==
- Fadda Dickson

== Key programmes ==
Below are the list of programs by Hello FM (Ghana):

Table Showing Hello FM (Ghana) Key programmes
Day	Name of Program	Time	Host
Monday	KOKROKOO	5:30am to 9am	Adwoa Aprebi
	Hello Sports	2pm to 3pm	
	Hello News	3pm and 8pm	Adwoa Aprebi
	Ewanso Brebre	3:30- 6pm	Yaw Adu (Bonshayka)
	Bohobiom	8: 15 pm to 10pm	Sampson Kwame Nyamekye
Tuesday	Hello News	3pm and 8pm	Adwoa Aprebi
	Hello Sports	2pm to 3pm	
	Ewanso Brebre	3:30- 6pm	Yaw Adu (Bonshayka)
	Bohobiom	8: 15 pm to 10pm	Sampson Kwame Nyamekye
Wednesday	Hello Sports	2pm to 3pm	
	Hello News	3pm and 8pm	Adwoa Aprebi
	Ewanso Brebre	3:30- 6pm	Yaw Adu (Bonshayka)
	Bohobiom	8: 15 pm to 10pm	Sampson Kwame Nyamekye
Thursday	Hello Sport	2pm to 3pm	
	Hello News	3pm and 8pm	Adwoa Aprebi
	Ewanso Brebre	3:30- 6pm	Yaw Adu (Bonshayka)
	Mmra No Ses3n	8:15pm to 9:30pm	
Friday	Mpom Tes3n	2:00pm to 3pm	
	Hello News	3pm and 8pm	Adwoa Aprebi
	Ewanso Brebre	3:30- 6pm	Yaw Adu (Bonshayka)
	Hello Sports	10am to 12pm	
Saturday	Akoko Abon	7am to 10 am	King Edward
	Hello News	3pm and 8pm	Adwoa Aprebi
	Ewanso Brebre	3:30- 6pm	Yaw Adu (Bonshayka)
	Abrabo Pa	7pm to 9pm	Ama Nyarko Attafuah Quainoo
Sunday			
	Bible Adesua	1:00pm to 2:30 pm	
	Hello News	3pm and 8pm	Adwoa Aprebi
	Ewanso Brebre	3:30- 6pm	Yaw Adu (Bonshayka)
