= Okay FM =

Radio station in Accra, Ghana

- Accra; Ghana
- Broadcast area: Greater Accra Region
- Frequency: 101.7 MHz

Programming
- Languages: Twi, English

Ownership
- Owner: Despite Group of Companies; (Paradise Vision Estates Ltd.)
- Sister stations: Hello FM (Ghana), Peace FM (Ghana), Neat FM, UTV Ghana

Links
- Website: OkayFMOnline.com

Okay FM is a private radio station in the Greater Accra Region owned and operated by the Despite Media Group. The station is both active on 101.7fm and online. The station is one of few stations owned and run by the media group company Despite Media Group. The station focus on playing African Music and foreign musical genres.

== Notable personalities ==
- Abeiku Santana
- Fadda Dickson
