= Neat FM =

Radio station in Accra, Ghana

Neat FM (Ghana)
- Accra; Ghana
- Broadcast area: Greater Accra Region
- Frequency: 100.9 MHz,

Programming
- Languages: Twi, English
- Format: news, business, politics, and entertainment.

Ownership
- Owner: Despite Group of Companies
- Sister stations: Hello FM (Ghana), Peace FM (Ghana), Okay FM, UTV Ghana

Links
- Website: NeatFMOnline.com

Neat FM (Ghana) Neat FM is a private radio station in the Greater Accra Region that ultimately is run by the Despite Group of Companies. The station is both active on 100.9fm and online. The station is one of few stations owned and run by the media group company Despite Group of Companies. The station focus on playing African Music and foreign musical genres. Neat FM provides "latest peculiar but true religious news content to its audience."

== Notable personalities ==
- Fadda Dickson
