= United Television Ghana =

Television channel in Ghana

United Television Ghana (UTV Ghana)
- Country: Ghana
- Broadcast area: Ghana
- Network: United Television Ghana (UTV Ghana)
- Headquarters: Abeka-Lapaz, Accra Ghana

Programming
- Picture format: 576i (SDTV)

Ownership
- Owner: Despite Group of Companies
- Sister channels: Peace FM Ghana, Okay FM, Neat FM

History
- Launched: 2013

Links
- Website: http://utvghana.com

United Television Ghana Limited (UTV Ghana) is a private, free-to-air television broadcaster in Ghana. It was launched in 2013 by The Despite Group of Companies, headed by Mr. Osei Kwame Despite. UTV Ghana airs and produces a variety of television programmes including news bulletins, dramas and successful telenovelas, films and other entertainment.

== History ==
UTV started broadcasting in 2013 and by 2015 had become the most-watched channel in Ghana. In the third quarter of 2015, the channel had an average share of 22.4%. In 2023, the UTV facilities were attacked by 16 people, who were arrested by the Ministry of Information, after showing displeasure in the opinions in one of its live programmes.

== Awards ==
- Health Advocate–Media Institution, awarded at the 2017 People's Choice Practitioners Honours by Media Men Ghana
- Radio and Television Personalities Awards TV Station Of The Year 2019–2020.

== See also ==
- Media of Ghana

== Programmes ==
- The Real News
- Adehye Nsroma
- United Showbiz (Empress Gifty, Anold Asamoah Baido, Bull Dog)
