= 2006–07 Queens Park Rangers F.C. season =

English football club season

Queens Park Rangers
2006–07 season
- Chairman: Gianni Paladini
- Manager: Gary Waddock (until 19 September); John Gregory (from 20 September)
- Stadium: Loftus Road
- Football League Championship: 18th
- FA Cup: Third round
- League Cup: Second round
- Top goalscorer: League: Blackstock (13); All: Blackstock (14)
- Highest home attendance: 16,741 6 May 2007 Stoke City
- Lowest home attendance: 4,569 22 August 2006 Northampton Town
- Average home league attendance: 12,936
- Biggest win: 4-2 Vs Crystal Palace (4 November 2006)
- Biggest defeat: 0-5 Vs Southend United (9 February 2007)
Home colours	Away colours

During the 2006–07 English football season, Queens Park Rangers F.C. competed in the Football League Championship.

== Season summary ==
On 28 June 2006, Holloway was put on Gardening leave and eventually left for Plymouth Argyle and Gary Waddock was appointed full-time manager. On 20 September 2006, after a poor set of results had left QPR bottom of the table, Waddock was replaced by John Gregory. Waddock did, however, stay at the club as assistant manager. Gregory's appointment caused a schism among QPR fans, some of whom saw Gregory's friendship with controversial chairman Gianni Paladini as a conflict of interest. After a decent start with successive victories over Hull City and Southampton, Rangers form dipped before winning three on the bounce (including a victory at (then) league leaders Cardiff City). Unfortunately, results did not continue to improve, and relegation looked a distinct possibility for Gregory's men. However, following a fine late season run, QPR beat Cardiff 1–0 at Loftus Road on 21 April 2007 to secure their Championship status for another year.

== Kit ==
Le Coq Sportif continued as QPR's kit manufacturers. Retailer Cargiant became kit sponsors.

== Final league table ==
Pos	Team	Pld	W	D	L	GF	GA	GD	Pts
16	Norwich City	46	16	9	21	56	71	−15	57
17	Coventry City	46	16	8	22	47	62	−15	56
18	Queens Park Rangers	46	14	11	21	54	68	−14	53
19	Leicester City	46	13	14	19	49	64	−15	53
20	Barnsley	46	15	5	26	53	85	−32	50

Source: RSSSF
Rules for classification: In the Football League goals scored (F) takes precedence over goal difference (GD).

== Results ==
Queens Park Rangers' score comes first

=== Legend ===
Win	Draw	Loss

=== Coca-Cola Championship ===
Date	Opponents	Venue	Result F–A	Scorers	Attendance	Position
5 August 2006	Burnley	A	0–2		12,190	24
8 August 2006	Leeds United	H	2–2	Rowlands 81' (pen), Baidoo 90'	13,996	18
12 August 2006	Southend United	H	2–0	Rowlands 31', Ward 41'	12,368	12
19 August 2006	Preston North End	A	1–1	Ainsworth 5'	11,879	14
25 August 2006	Ipswich Town	H	1–3	Gallen 58'	10,918	20
9 September 2006	Plymouth Argyle	A	1–1	Blackstock 17'	12,138	22
12 September 2006	Birmingham City	H	0–2		10,936	23
16 September 2006	Colchester United	A	1–2	Brown 76' (o.g.)	5,246	24
23 September 2006	Hull City	H	2–0	R Jones 60', Blackstock 80'	11,381	19
30 September 2006	Southampton	A	2–1	Blackstock 34', R Jones 40'	25,185	16
14 October 2006	Norwich City	H	3–3	Smith 24', Rowlands 45', 90'	14,793	15
17 October 2006	Derby County	H	1–2	Smith 7'	10,882	19
21 October 2006	Sheffield Wednesday	A	2–3	Blackstock 50', 54'	23,813	19
28 October 2006	Leicester City	H	1–1	Rowlands 68' (pen)	12,430	19
31 October 2006	West Bromwich Albion	A	3–3	Stewart 45', Gallen 48', Nygaard 83'	17,417	20
4 November 2006	Crystal Palace	H	4–2	Smith 34', 69', Lomas 59', Gallen 66' (pen)	13,989	19
11 November 2006	Luton Town	A	3–2	Smith 33', Heikkinen 51' (o.g.), Blackstock 54'	9,007	18
17 November 2006	Cardiff City	A	1–0	R Jones 88'	13,250	14
25 November 2006	Coventry City	H	0–1		12,840	15
28 November 2006	Sunderland	H	1–2	R Jones 73'	13,108	17
2 December 2006	Crystal Palace	A	0–3		17,017	19
9 December 2006	Stoke City	A	0–1		16,487	20
16 December 2006	Wolverhampton Wanderers	H	0–1		12,323	20
23 December 2006	Barnsley	H	1–0	Rowlands 15'	11,307	20
26 December 2006	Birmingham City	A	1–2	Cook 31'	29,431	20
30 December 2006	Norwich City	A	0–1		25,113	20
1 January 2007	Colchester United	H	1–0	R Jones 36'	11,319	20
13 January 2007	Hull City	A	1–2	Blackstock 45'	19,791	20
20 January 2007	Southampton	H	0–2		14,686	21
30 January 2007	Barnsley	A	0–2		9,890	22
3 February 2007	Burnley	H	3–1	Cook 13', Blackstock 55', Lomas 72'	10,811	19
9 February 2007	Southend United	A	0–5		10,217	19
17 February 2007	Preston North End	H	PP			
20 February 2007	Leeds United	A	0–0		29,593	21
24 February 2007	Plymouth Argyle	H	1–1	Cook 59'	13,757	21
3 March 2007	Ipswich Town	A	1–2	Furlong 71'	21,412	21
10 March 2007	Sheffield Wednesday	H	1–1	Rowlands 72' (pen)	15,188	21
13 March 2007	Derby County	A	1–1	Rowlands 12'	27,567	22
17 March 2007	Leicester City	A	3–1	Idiakez 47', Nygaard 51' (pen), 68'	24,558	21
31 March 2007	West Bromwich Albion	H	1–2	Blackstock 63'	14,784	21
3 April 2007	Preston North End	H	1–0	Blackstock 51'	11,910	20
7 April 2007	Coventry City	A	1–0	Smith 53'	22,850	19
9 April 2007	Luton Town	H	3–2	Blackstock 41', 81' (pen), Furlong 90'	14,360	18
14 April 2007	Sunderland	A	1–2	Rowlands 23' (pen)	39,206	18
21 April 2007	Cardiff City	H	1–0	Blackstock 23'	12,710	18
28 April 2007	Wolverhampton Wanderers	A	0–2		24,931	19
6 May 2007	Stoke City	H	1–1	Rowlands 6'	16,741	18

=== FA Cup ===
Round	Date	Opponents	Venue	Result F–A	Scorers	Attendance
R3	6 January 2007	Luton Town (Championship)	H	2–2	Blackstock 32', Baidoo 76'	10,064
R3R	16 January 2007	Luton Town (Championship)				
R3R	23 January 2007	Luton Town (Championship)	A	0–1		7,494

=== Carling Cup ===
Round	Date	Opponents	Venue	Result F–A	Scorers	Attendance
R1	22 August 2006	Northampton Town (League One)	H	3–2	Cook 18', Gallen 50', R Jones 87'	4,569
R2	19 September 2006	Port Vale (League One)	A	2–3	Nygaard 9', Stewart 78'	3,550

=== Friendlies ===
Date	Opponents	Venue	Result F–A	Scorers	Attendance	Report
8-Jul-06	Aldershot v Queens Park Rangers	A	1-1	Docherty 25'		
19-Jul-06	Stevenage Borough v Queens Park Rangers	A	4-1			
22-Jul-06	Gillingham	A				
24-Jul-06	Sorrento Calcio	A	1-5	Czerkas		
28-Jul-06	San Antonio Abate	A	4-0	Ward, Nygaard, Baidoo, Jones		
8-Nov-06	Wycombe Wanderers v Queens Park Rangers	A				
3-Jan-07	Chelsea v Queens Park Rangers	A				
7 February 2007	China Olympic XI	H	*			

== Squad ==
Position	Squad Number	Nationality	Name	Coca-Cola Championship Appearances	Coca-Cola Championship Goals	Cup Appearances	Carling Cup Goals	F.A.Cup Goals	Total Appearances	Total Goals
GK	1	ENG	Simon Royce	20		2			22	
GK	21	WAL	Paul Jones	12					12	
GK	20	ENG	Lee Camp	11					11	
GK	12	ENG	Jake Cole	3		2			5	
GK	26	ENG	Sean Thomas							
DF	34	ENG	Rohan Ricketts						2	
DF	38	ENG	Michael Mancienne	26		2			30	
DF	27	FIN	Sampsa Timoska	11					14	
DF	7	ENG	Matthew Rose	10					14	
DF	2	ENG	Marcus Bignot	32		3			35	
DF	15	ENG	Dominic Shimmin	1					1	
DF	3	ITA	Mauro Milanese	14					16	
DF	33	ENG	Andrew Howell			1			1	
DF	25	JAM	Damion Stewart	45	1	4	1		49	2
DF	24	DRC	Pat Kanyuka	7		2			13	
DF	4	ENG	Danny Cullip	13					13	
DF	5	PAK	Zesh Rehman	23		2			27	
DF	4	ENG	Ian Evatt							
DF	4	NIG	Danny Shittu							
DF	34	ENG	Matthew Hislop							
DF	35	ENG	Jon Munday							
MF	28	ESP	Inigo Idiakez	4					5	
MF	7	ENG	Adam Bolder	17					17	
MF	9	AUS	Nick Ward	11	1	2			21	1
MF	14	ENG	Martin Rowlands	27	10				29	10
MF	8	ENG	Marc Bircham	12		2			20	
MF	16	NIR	Steve Lomas	26	1	2			36	1
MF	20	ENG	Scott Donnelly						3	
MF	11	ENG	Gareth Ainsworth	18	1				23	1
MF	17	ENG	Lee Cook	37	3	4	1		41	3
MF	23	ENG	Stefan Bailey	7		3			13	
MF	28	NIG	Egutu Oliseh	2					3	
MF	6	NIR	Tommy Doherty							
MF	19	CAM	Armel Tchakounte							
FW	29	ENG	Paul Furlong	9	2				23	2
FW	18	ENG	Stefan Moore	3					3	
FW	31	ENG	Ray Jones	17	5	1	1		33	6
FW	30	DEN	Marc Nygaard	17	3	2	1		25	4
FW	22	ENG	Shabazz Baidoo	2	1	1		1	12	2
FW	37	ENG	Jimmy Smith	22	6	2			31	6
FW	32	ENG	Dexter Blackstock	36	14	3		1	41	15
FW	27	POL	Adam Czerkas	2		1			4	
FW	10	ENG	Kevin Gallen	9	3	1	1		19	4

=== Left club during season ===
Note: Flags indicate national team as defined under FIFA eligibility rules; some limited exceptions apply. Players may hold more than one non-FIFA nationality.

No.	Pos.	Nation	Player
4	DF	ENG	Ian Evatt (to Blackpool)
5	DF	NGA	Danny Shittu (to Watford)
7	DF	ENG	Matthew Rose (to Yeovil Town)
20	MF	ENG	Scott Donnelly (to Wealdstone)
20	GK	ENG	Lee Camp (on loan from Derby County)
27	FW	POL	Adam Czerkas (on loan from Korona Kielce)

No.	Pos.	Nation	Player
28	MF	NGA	Egutu Oliseh (to Montpelier)
28	MF	ESP	Iñigo Idiakez (on loan from Southampton)
34	DF	ENG	Matthew Hislop (to Lewes)
35	DF	ENG	Jonathan Munday (to Hayes)
40	DF	ITA	Ugo Ukah (Note: Ukah was born in Parma, Italy, but also qualifies to represent Nigeria internationally and would make his international debut for Nigeria in 2011.) (released)

== Transfers Out ==
Name	Date	From	Fee	Date	To	Fee
Georges Santos	Ipswich	30 July 2004	Free	July 2006	Brighton	Free
Luke Townsend	Scholar	Apr5		July 2006	Crawley Town	Free
Richard Langley	Cardiff	31 Aug 2005	Free	July 2006	Luton	Free
Danny Shittu	Charlton	23 Oct 2001	£350,000	August 2006	Watford	£2,000,000
Ian Evatt	Chesterfield	2 June 2005	£150,000	August 2006	Blackpool	loan
Tommy Doherty	Bristol City	June 2005		September 2006	Wycombe Wanderers	Loan
Adam Czerkas	Korona Kielce (Pol)	18 July 2006	Loan	December 2006	Korona Kielce (Pol)	Loan
Matthew Rose	Arsenal	19 May 1997	£500,000	January 2007	Yeovil Town	Free
Nick Ward	Perth Glory	July 2006		January 2007	Brighton & Hove Albion	Loan
Zesh Rehman	Fulham	August 2006	£500,000	March 2007	Brighton & Hove Albion	Loan
Sammy Youssouf	Maritimo (Por)	27 Jan 2006	Free	July 2007	Viborg (Den)	Free
Egutu Oliseh	La Louvière (Bel)	17 July 2006	Free	January 2007	Montpellier (Fra)	Free
Ian Evatt	Chesterfield	2 June 2005	£150,000	January 2007	Blackpool	Free
Jon Munday	Scholar	18 Apr 2006		January 2007	Hayes	Free
Matthew Hislop	Arsenal	7 Mar 2005	Free	January 2007	Hayes & Yeading U	Free
Scott Donnelly	Scholar	24 Feb 2006		January 2007	Wealdstone	Free
Ugo Ukah	Nourese (Ita)	Nov 2006	Free	January 2007	Giulianova (Ita)	Free
Taku Watanabe	Crystal P	July 2006	Free	Feb 2007		Free
Michael Standing	Chesterfield	31 Jan 2007	Non-contract	Mar 2007	Bournemouth	Free
Inigo Idiakez	Southampton	9 Mar 2007	Loan	April 2007	Southampton	Loan
Lee Camp	Derby	12 Feb 2007	Loan	April 2007	Derby	Loan
Jimmy Smith	Chelsea	27 Sep 2006	Loan	May 2007	Chelsea	Loan
Michael Mancienne	Chelsea	16 Oct 2006	Loan	May 2007	Chelsea	Loan
Rohan Ricketts	Wolverhampton	22 Mar 2007	Loan	May 2007	Wolverhampton	Loan

=== In ===
Name	From	Date	Fee
Taku Watanabe	Crystal P	July 2006	Free
Nick Ward	Perth Glory (Aus)	7 July 2006	Free
Egutu Oliseh	La Louvière (Bel)	17 July 2006	Free
Adam Czerkas	Korona Kielce (Pol)	18 July 2006	Loan
Andrew Howell	Scholar	August 2006	
Adam Czerkas	Odra Wodzisław	August 2006	Loan
Zesh Rehman	Fulham	8 Aug 2006	£250,000
Dexter Blackstock	Southampton	9 Aug 2006	£500,000
Jimmy Smith	Chelsea	27 Sep 2006	Loan
Michael Mancienne	Chelsea	16 Oct 2006	Loan
Ugo Ukah	Nourese (Ita)	Nov 2006	Free
Sampsa Timoska	MyPa (Fin)	3 Jan 2007	Free
Ray Jones	Scholar	5 Jan 2007	
Adam Bolder	Derby	27 Jan 2007	Free
Michael Standing	Chesterfield	31 Jan 2007	Non-contract
Danny Cullip	Nottingham	31 Jan 2007	Free
Lee Camp	Derby	12 Feb 2007	Loan
Inigo Idiakez	Southampton	9 Mar 2007	Loan
Rohan Ricketts	Wolverhampton	22 Mar 2007	Loan
Kieron St.Aimie	Scholar	17 May 2007	
(England) Chris Barker	(Wales) Cardiff City	5 June 2007	Free
(Wales) Daniel Nardiello	(England) Barnsley	27 June 2007	Free
(England) John Curtis	(England) Nottingham Forest	30 June 2007	Free
Aaron Goode	Scholar	1 June 2007	
Andrew Howell	Scholar	1 June 2007	

== Statistics ==
=== Goalscorers ===
Rank	Player	Position	Championship	League Cup	FA Cup	Total
1	(England) Dexter Blackstock	FW	12	0	1	13
2	(Republic of Ireland) Martin Rowlands	MF	10	0	0	10
3	(England) Jimmy Smith	MF	6	0	0	6
=	(England) Ray Jones	FW	5	1	0	6
5	(England) Lee Cook	MF	3	1	0	4
=	(England) Kevin Gallen	FW	3	1	0	4
=	(Denmark) Marc Nygaard	FW	3	1	0	4
8	(Northern Ireland) Steve Lomas	MF	2	0	0	2
=	(England) Paul Furlong	FW	2	0	0	2
=	(Jamaica) Damion Stewart	FW	1	1	0	2
=	(England) Shabazz Baidoo	FW	1	0	1	2
12	(Australia) Nick Ward	MF	1	0	0	1
=	(England) Gareth Ainsworth	MF	1	0	0	1
=	(Spain) Iñigo Idiakez	MF	1	0	0	1
=	(England) Adam Bolder	MF	2	0	0	2
11	(England) Stefan Moore	FW	1	0	0	1
TOTAL			60	1	0	61

=== Clean sheets ===
Rank	Player	Position	Championship	League Cup	FA Cup	Total
1	(England) Lee Camp	GK	4	0	0	4
2	(England) Simon Royce	GK	3	0	0	3
3	(Wales) Paul Jones	GK	1	0	0	1
=	(England) Jake Cole	GK	1	0	0	1
