= 2007–08 Queens Park Rangers F.C. season =

English football club season

Queens Park Rangers
2007–2008 season
- Chairman: Gianni Paladini
- Manager: John Gregory; Mick Harford; Luigi De Canio
- Stadium: Loftus Road
- Championship: 14th
- FA Cup: Third round
- League Cup: First round
- Top goalscorer: League: All: Akos Buzsaky 10
- Highest home attendance: 18,309 4 May 2008 West Bromwich Albion
- Lowest home attendance: 5,260 14 October 2007 Leyton Orient
- Average home league attendance: 13,958
- Biggest win: 3–0 Vs Bristol City (2 February 2008)
- Biggest defeat: 1–5 Vs West Bromwich Albion (30 September 2007)
Home colours	Away colours

During the 2007–08 season, Queens Park Rangers were playing in the Football League Championship.

== Review ==
=== Pre-season ===
Manager John Gregory began rebuilding the squad before the new season, bringing in Daniel Nardiello, Chris Barker and John Curtis on free transfers. Andrew Howell, Kieron St Aimie and Aaron Goode all signed one-year professional contracts after impressing in the youth team under Joe Gallen, who was later sacked, despite his under 18s winning the league. Gregory also signed more backroom staff, including Paul Hunter as the new physio, Mick Harford as assistant manager, Ed de Goey and Warren Neill as coaches and Steve Brown and Keith Ryan as youth team coaches. Creative left winger Lee Cook was sold to rivals Fulham for a deal reported as potentially worth between £2.5 million and £4.5 million. Michael Mancienne also extended his loan for a further season. On 26 July, QPR completed the loan signing of Ben Sahar for three months (subsequently extended until January 2008). The signings of Lee Camp and Simon Walton followed the day after on 27 July, totalling £500,000.

During pre-season, new signing Simon Walton fractured his leg in a non-competitive 2–1 victory against Fulham and was side-lined for several months.

=== Tragic start ===
The season began turbulently, with a draw against recently promoted Bristol City, a loss in the League Cup 2–1 at home to League One Leyton Orient followed by a further 2–0 defeat at home by Cardiff City. The match against Burnley on 25 August was postponed after promising teenage player Ray Jones was killed in a car crash in the early hours of the morning. A week later QPR crashed to a 3–0 defeat at home to Southampton, followed by a draw with Leicester and a further home defeat by Plymouth (0–2) before picking up only their second point of the month (and the third of the season) at home to Watford on 22 September.

=== New manager ===
On 1 October it was announced that John Gregory had been sacked after 13 months in charge. This came after a comprehensive 5–1 defeat in front of the Sky Sports cameras against West Bromwich Albion on 30 September. First-team coach Mick Harford was placed in temporary charge. Three consecutive fixtures against East Anglian opposition saw Rangers defeated at the hands of Colchester before earning their first win of the season at home to Norwich and salvaging a draw with Ipswich at Loftus Road. After a goalless draw at Preston and a rare victory away to Charlton, Harford left the club later in the month and was replaced by Luigi De Canio. His first game in charge was a 2–0 victory against Hull City.

=== Signs of recovery ===
Following the arrival of De Canio, Rangers endured defeats at the hands of Coventry, Stoke, Blackpool and Crystal Palace before a brief run of four games without defeat in mid-December indicated signs of a recovery. On 11 December 2007 QPR were drawn away from home at Chelsea in the third round of the FA Cup, a tie due to be played on 5 January 2008. The fixture would be the first competitive West London derby between the two sides since 1996.

The Christmas and New Year period was largely successful for the club with Rangers bouncing back from a defeat at Plymouth on Boxing Day and picking up wins away from home at second-placed Watford (4–2) and at Loftus Road against fellow strugglers Leicester (3–1).

=== Investment ===
Shortly prior to the traditional Christmas fixture period on 20 December 2007 it was announced that the family of Lakshmi Mittal had purchased a 20 per cent shareholding in the club. As part of the investment Lakshmi Mittal's son-in-law took a place on the board of directors. Continuing the theme of previous seasons a number of loan signings featured for the club including Gavin Mahon, Ákos Buzsáky and Rowan Vine. The investment potential of the club's new backers resulted in a number of speculative storylines in the football press throughout the season, including rumoured signings of former World Player of the Year winners Luís Figo and Zinedine Zidane, the latter as a possible manager.

=== New recruits ===
Rangers signed several players during the January transfer window: Ákos Buzsáky who had previously been on loan from Plymouth Argyle, Hogan Ephraim from West Ham, Kieran Lee on loan from Manchester United, Gavin Mahon on loan from Watford, Matthew Connolly from Arsenal, Patrick Agyemang from Preston and Fitz Hall from Wigan. Early in January QPR also managed to secure striker Rowan Vine in a permanent move following his brief loan spell which had ended in December.

=== January onwards ===
Around 6,000 Rangers fans made the short trip to Stamford Bridge on the first weekend in January to see QPR put up a determined effort against their Premier League neighbours Chelsea in the FA Cup third round. Ultimately the R's lost 1–0 to an unfortunate deflected own goal from Lee Camp. The Cup defeat was followed by defeat away to Sheffield United. The month ended for Rangers with a 2–0 home win over Barnsley followed by a defeat at Cardiff. As the January transfer window closed, QPR secured American goalkeeper Matt Pickens and Northern Irish defender Damien Delaney and parted ways with a number of players including Marcus Bignot, Danny Cullip, Nick Ward, Dominic Shimmin, Sampsa Timoska, Shabazz Baidoo, Kieron St Aimie, Stefan Moore and Pat Kanyuka. Adam Bolder, Daniel Nardiello and Simon Walton were also put out on loan.

==== February ====
The club started February well defeating third-placed Bristol City 3–0 at Loftus Road followed by a 3–2 away win at Southampton. Showing some signs of a recovery from the start to the season, the Southampton victory left QPR 6 points off the playoffs and 8 points above the relegation zone. At the same time, Flavio Briatore took over from Alejandro Agag as the chairman of QPR's holding company. Briatore's arrival also signalled the demise of the club mascot, 'Jude the stadium cat'. According to newspaper reports, the black cat was incompatible with Briatore's superstitions and the matchday programme on 2 February subsequently announced Jude the Cat had "gone on holiday". On 12 February the club's erratic form then saw them fall to a 6th home defeat of the season, losing to Burnley 2–4 after at one stage leading 2–0.

Taking advantage of their next league fixture opponents Barnsley playing Liverpool in the FA Cup on 16 February, QPR organised a mid-season training camp to the Vale de Lobo resort in the Algarve region of Portugal. Gareth Ainsworth was appointed club captain in place of Adam Bolder following his loan move to Sheffield Wednesday. Rangers closed out February with draws against Sheffield United (1–1) at home and away in the rearranged fixture with Barnsley (0–0).

==== March ====
A televised fixture at home to Stoke on 2 March saw QPR convincingly defeat the second-placed side 3–0, continuing the club's successful form against the top sides in the division. In contrast, Rangers' following game against relegation-zone Coventry City ended in a hard-fought 0–0 draw with Coventry dominating much of the play, acknowledged by the praise directed at Lee Camp for his goalkeeping performance. Similarly their next game against a struggling Sheffield Wednesday at Hillsborough saw them lose 2–1, before returning to winning ways at home to Blackpool (3–2); a result which left them 12th in the league, 8 points outside the play-offs and 7 points above the relegation zone. Reflecting the increasingly high profile of the club, the mid-week Blackpool match was watched from the Directors' Box by Asantehene King Otumfuo Nana Osei Tutu II as well as Real Madrid's president, Ramón Calderón accompanying the club's three owners Mittal, Ecclestone and Briatore. Continuing their solid home form in which Rangers had lost just once in their previous ten games at Loftus Road and scored 22 goals, the club ran out 3–1 winners against a Scunthorpe side battling relegation. With only seven fixtures remaining, the victory meant QPR remained 12th in the Championship, 7 points from the play-off positions and 8 points clear of relegation. Continuing speculation around the level of new investment in the club fuelled rumours of the possible signing of Luís Figo, although they were promptly dismissed by the player's representatives.

Rangers travelled to play-off hopefuls Wolves on the Easter weekend (22 March) and squandered the lead three times, twice in injury time periods at the end of each half and ultimately conspiring in a 3–3 final score. On 25 March the board announced a five-year kit sponsorship deal with Lotto Sport Italia, which could be worth up to £20 million should QPR win promotion to the Premier League. The contract comes into effect for the 2008–09 season and is the most financially rewarding in the club's history. On 29 March Rangers frustrated Ipswich's play-off ambitions by holding them to a goal—less draw at Portman Road – principally as a result of Lee Camp's goalkeeping heroics. Following the match approximately 15 QPR supporters caused an affray at Manningtree station prompting three arrests.

==== April ====
On 1 April QPR fan website Vital QPR declared an exclusive that Microsoft founder Bill Gates was to invest in the club, which, despite being an apparent April Fools' Day joke, was repeated on general news and QPR fan sites. Striker Rowan Vine fractured his leg in a training incident on 3 April 2008 and was ruled out for the rest of the season. Two days later on 5 April, Rangers narrowly avoided a 2–0 home defeat to an in-form Preston side by dramatically scoring twice in injury time at the end of the second half.

After a Friday which saw Briatore promote his vision of QPR as a global super brand, and with both relegation and promotion now an irrelevance QPR travelled to Hull City on 12 April to face a team who had netted five and kept two clean-sheets in their previous two games. A contentious first-half goal by Rangers was cancelled-out late in the game by Hull's Michael Turner. The 1–1 result left QPR 14th in the Championship and ten points adrift of the play-offs with just 3 games (9 points) remaining.

Rangers nevertheless continued to contribute to the fate of the Championship's promotion hopefuls, despite being unable to affect their own playoff chances, consigning fellow-Londoners Charlton Athletic to a further season in the second tier after beating them 1–0 at Loftus Road courtesy of Dexter Blackstock. A heavy defeat to Norwich at Carrow Road (0–3), where Damion Stewart was sent off after just 4 minutes, drew April to a disappointing close.

=== End of the season ===
QPR's final game of the season on 4 May was at home against Championship title hopefuls West Brom, the team whose comprehensive defeat of Rangers in September signalled the end of John Gregory's reign. Prior to the game QPR unveiled a new badge which was introduced to signify a new era for the club, although newspapers had earlier erroneously speculated that the announcement would reveal Zinedine Zidane as the new manager. Following a red card for Martin Rowlands, Rangers fell to a 2–0 defeat and suffered the indignity of seeing the Championship title trophy presented to West Brom at Loftus Road. The result meant QPR finished 14th in the Championship table with 58 points, 12 points below the play-off zone and 6 points from relegation.

Following the game Martin Rowlands was named both the club's Ray Jones Players' Player of the Year and the Supporters' Player of the Year. Chelsea loan player and England U21 international defender Michael Mancienne was awarded the Supporters' Young Player of the Year award. Akos Buzsaky won the Kiyan Prince Goal of the Season award for his goal against Blackpool at Loftus Road on 11 March. Zesh Rehman was also awarded for his Community Commitment.

On 8 May, QPR announced that Luigi De Canio had left the club "by mutual consent" and that a further announcement regarding a new manager for the following season would be made in due course.

== Kit ==
Le Coq Sportif continued as QPR's kit manufacturers. Retailer Cargiant continued as kit sponsors.

== Squad ==
Shirt Number	Position	Nationality	Name	League Appearances	League Goals	Cup Appearances	League.Cup Goals	F.A.Cup Goals	Total Appearances	Total Goals
1	GK	ENG	Lee Camp	46		2			48	
12	GK	ENG	Jake Cole							
15	GK	ENG	Chris Goodchild							
18	GK	ENG	Matt Pickens							
33	GK	AUS	Reece Crowther							
16	DF	ENG	Matthew Connolly	18		1			21	
14	DF	ENG	Martin Cranie	6					6	
6	DF	ENG	Michael Mancienne	26		1			31	
27	DF	FIN	Sampsa Timoska	3					7	
3	DF	ENG	Chris Barker	25		1			26	
2	DF	ENG	Marcus Bignot			1			3	
2	DF	IRE	Damien Delaney	17	1				17	1
29	DF	ENG	Fitz Hall	14		1			15	
25	DF	SCO	Bob Malcolm	10					11	
5	DF	JAM	Damion Stewart	35	5	1			41	5
4	DF	ENG	Danny Cullip	5		1			7	
28	DF	PAK	Zesh Rehman	17		1			22	
19	MF	ENG	Simon Walton	1		4			5	
4	MF	ENG	Gavin Mahon	11	1	1			17	1
7	MF	ENG	Adam Bolder	20	2	1			24	2
29	MF	AUS	Nick Ward			1			2	
14	MF	ENG	Martin Rowlands	43	6	2		1	46	7
25	MF	ENG	Hogan Ephraim	20	2	1			30	
21	MF	ENG	John Curtis	3					4	
21	MF	ENG	Kieran Lee	2					7	
37	MF	ENG	Romone Rose						1	
11	MF	ENG	Gareth Ainsworth	16	2	1			25	2
16	MF	ENG	Jason Jarrett	1					1	
32	MF	ATG	Mikele Leigertwood	33	5				40	5
23	MF	ENG	Stefan Bailey	1		1			2	
34	FW	ENG	Scott Sinclair	8	1	1			9	1
10	FW	HUN	Akos Buzsaky	24	10	1			28	10
8	FW	ENG	Daniel Nardiello	4					8	
26	FW	ENG	Rowan Vine	31	7	2			33	7
18	FW	ENG	Stefan Moore	5	1	1			12	1
17	FW	ENG	Patrick Agyemang	17	9				18	9
30	FW	DEN	Marc Nygaard	6	1	1			21	1
20	FW	ENG	Kieron St Aimie						1	
9	FW	ENG	Dexter Blackstock	26	6	1			36	6
17	FW	ISR	Ben Sahar	6					9	
36	FW	COL	Angelo Balanta	6	1				12	1

=== Out on loan ===
Note: Flags indicate national team as defined under FIFA eligibility rules; some limited exceptions apply. Players may hold more than one non-FIFA nationality.

No.	Pos.	Nation	Player
7	MF	ENG	Adam Bolder (on loan to Sheffield Wednesday)
8	FW	WAL	Daniel Nardiello (Note: Nardiello was born in Coventry, England, but also qualified to represent Wales internationally through his father, the United States through his mother, and Italy and Puerto Rico through his grandparents, and made his international debut for Wales in May 2007.) (on loan to Barnsley)
19	MF	ENG	Simon Walton (on loan to Hull City)

No.	Pos.	Nation	Player
28	DF	PAK	Zesh Rehman (on loan to Blackpool)
—	FW	ENG	Danny Maguire (on loan to AFC Wimbledon)

=== Transfers ===
==== In ====
Date	Pos.	Name	From	Fee	Source
5 June 2007	DF	(England) Chris Barker	(Wales) Cardiff City	Free	
27 June 2007	FW	(Wales) Daniel Nardiello	(England) Barnsley	Free	
30 June 2007	DF	(England) John Curtis	(England) Nottingham Forest	Free	
27 July 2007	GK	(England) Lee Camp	(England) Derby County	£300,000	
27 July 2007	MF	(England) Simon Walton	(England) Charlton Athletic	£200,000	
31 August 2007	MF	(England) Mikele Leigertwood	(England) Sheffield United	£900,000	
2 January 2008	DF	(England) Matthew Connolly	(England) Arsenal	Undisclosed	
2 January 2008	MF	(England) Hogan Ephraim	(England) West Ham United	Undisclosed	
2 January 2008	MF	(Hungary) Ákos Buzsáky	(England) Plymouth Argyle	Undisclosed	
3 January 2008	FW	(Ghana) Patrick Agyemang	(England) Preston North End	Undisclosed	
4 January 2008	DF	(England) Fitz Hall	(England) Wigan Athletic	Undisclosed	
8 January 2008	FW	(England) Rowan Vine	(England) Birmingham City	£1,000,000	
17 January 2008	DF	(Republic of Ireland) Damien Delaney	(England) Hull City	Undisclosed	
7 February 2008	GK	(United States) Matt Pickens	Unattached	Free	

==== Out ====
Date	Pos.	Name	To	Fee	Source
1 July 2007	GK	(England) Simon Royce	Unattached	Released	
1 July 2007	GK	(Wales) Paul Jones	Unattached	Released	
1 July 2007	DF	(Italy) Mauro Milanese	Unattached	Released	
1 July 2007	MF	(Cameroon) Armel Tchakounte	Unattached	Released	
1 July 2007	MF	(Canada) Marc Bircham (Note: Bircham was born in Brent, England, but also qualified to represent Canada internationally through his grandfather and made his international debut for Canada in April 1999.)	Unattached	Released	
1 July 2007	MF	(Northern Ireland) Steve Lomas (Note: Lomas was born in Hanover, West Germany (now Germany), but was raised in Northern Ireland from the age of 2 and made his international debut for Northern Ireland in 1994.)	Unattached	Released	
1 July 2007	FW	(England) Kevin Gallen	Unattached	Released	
1 July 2007	FW	(England) Paul Furlong	Unattached	Released	
19 July 2007	MF	(England) Lee Cook	(England) Fulham	£2.500,000	
November 2007	DF	(England) Danny Cullip	Unattached	Contract terminated	
4 December 2007	MF	(Australia) Nick Ward	Unattached	Contract terminated	
3 January 2008	MF	(Northern Ireland) Tommy Doherty (Note: Doherty was born in Bristol, England, but also qualified to represent Northern Ireland internationally through his grandfather and represented the Northern Ireland B team before making his international debut for Northern Ireland in June 2003.)	(England) Wycombe Wanderers	Free	
15 January 2008	DF	(England) Marcus Bignot	Unattached	Contract terminated	
17 January 2008	DF	(Democratic Republic of the Congo) Patrick Kanyuka	Unattached	Contract terminated	
17 January 2008	MF	(England) Kieron St Aimie	Unattached	Contract terminated	
17 January 2008	FW	(England) Shabazz Baidoo	Unattached	Contract terminated	
23 January 2008	FW	(England) Stefan Moore	Unattached	Contract terminated	
28 January 2008	DF	(England) Dominic Shimmin	Unattached	Contract terminated	
January 2008	FW	(Denmark) Marc Nygaard	(Denmark) Randers	Undisclosed	
7 February 2008	DF	(Finland) Sampsa Timoska	Unattached	Contract terminated	

== Competitions ==
=== League table ===
Pos	Team	Pld	W	D	L	GF	GA	GD	Pts
12	Cardiff City	46	16	16	14	59	55	+4	64
13	Burnley	46	16	14	16	60	67	−7	62
14	Queens Park Rangers	46	14	16	16	60	66	−6	58
15	Preston North End	46	15	11	20	50	56	−6	56
16	Sheffield Wednesday	46	14	13	19	54	55	−1	55

Updated to match(es) played on 4 May 2008. Source: The Football League
Rules for classification: 1) points; 2) goal difference; 3) number of goals scored.

== Results ==
=== Friendly matches ===
Friendly match details
Date	Opponents	Venue	Result	Score F–A	Scorers	Attendance	Ref.
11-Jul-07	Crawley Town	H	W	3-3	Bonne 59' Bonne 50' Field 9'		
15-Jul-07	Glasgow Celtic	H	L	1-5	Capone 22'		
18-Jul-07	Barnet	H	L	1-2		Closed Doors	
28 July 2007	Wycombe Wanderers	A	W	1–0	Rowlands 41'		
31-Jul-07	Harrow Borough	A	W	3-0	Nygaard, Bolder, Baidoo		
3-Aug-07	Fulham	H	W	2-1	Sahar 58', 68'	5,479	
7-Aug-07	Reading	A					
24-Sep-07	Barnet	H					
4-Feb-08	West Ham United	A					

=== Football League Championship ===
Championship match details
Date	Opponents	Venue	Result	Score F–A	Scorers	Attendance	League position	Ref.
11 August 2007	Bristol City	A	D	2–2	Blackstock 34' Stewart 90'	18,228	12th	
18 August 2007	Cardiff City	H	L	0–2		12,596	19th	
25 August 2007	Burnley	A	P	PP				
1 September 2007	Southampton	H	L	0–3		15,560	22nd	
15 September 2007	Leicester City	A	D	1–1	Leigertwood 82'	21,893	23rd	
18 September 2007	Plymouth Argyle	H	L	0–2		10,850	23rd	
22 September 2007	Watford	H	D	1–1	Moore 59'	14,240	23rd	
30 September 2007	West Bromwich Albion	A	L	1–5	Ainsworth 24'	24,757	24th	
2 October 2007	Colchester United	A	L	2–4	Ephraim 29', Vine 58'	5,361	24th	
8 October 2007	Norwich City	H	W	1–0	Rowlands 67' pen.	10,514	24th	
20 October 2007	Ipswich Town	H	D	1–1	Nygaard 73'	13,946	24th	
23 October 2007	Preston North End	A	D	0–0		11,407	24th	
27 October 2007	Charlton Athletic	A	W	1–0	Bolder 72'	23,671	23rd	
3 November 2007	Hull City	H	W	2–0	Ephraim 26', Leigertwood 56'	12,375	21st	
6 November 2007	Coventry City	H	L	1–2	Buzsaky 50'	11,922	21st	
10 November 2007	Crystal Palace	A	D	1–1	Sinclair 45'	17,010	22nd	
24 November 2007	Sheffield Wednesday	H	D	0–0		15,241	22nd	
27 November 2007	Stoke City	A	L	1–3	Vine 63'	11,147	22nd	
1 December 2007	Blackpool	A	L	0–1		8,527	22nd	
4 December 2007	Crystal Palace	H	L	1–2	Stewart 10'	13,300	24th	
8 December 2007	Scunthorpe United	A	D	2–2	Buzsaky 12', 42'	5,612	24th	
11 December 2007	Burnley	A	W	2–0	Stewart 60', Vine 90'	10,522	23rd	
15 December 2007	Wolverhampton Wanderers	H	D	0–0		13,482	24th	
22 December 2007	Colchester United	H	W	2–1	Buzsaky 27', 52'	12,464	21st	
26 December 2007	Plymouth Argyle	A	L	1–2	Ainsworth 20'	16,502	23rd	
29 December 2007	Watford	A	W	4–2	Rowlands 13' pen., 40', Stewart 29', Buzsaky 80'	18,698	20th	
1 January 2008	Leicester City	H	W	3–1	Stewart 15', Bolder 26', Blackstock 56'	13,326	18th	
12 January 2008	Sheffield United	A	L	1–2	Agyemang 45'	28,894	20th	
19 January 2008	Barnsley	H	W	2–0	Agyemang 5', Vine 45'	16,197	17th	
29 January 2008	Cardiff City	A	L	1–3	Ephraim 76'	13,602	19th	
2 February 2008	Bristol City	H	W	3–0	Agyemang 18', 33', Buzsaky 63'	16,502	18th	
9 February 2008	Southampton	A	W	3–2	Rowlands 38', Agyemang 45', 60'	22,505	15th	
12 February 2008	Burnley	H	L	2–4	Mahon 14', Agyemang 30'	13,410	17th	
16 February 2008	Barnsley	A	P	PP				
23 February 2008	Sheffield United	H	D	1–1	Balanta 19'	15,383	16th	
26 February 2008	Barnsley	A	D	0–0		9,019	15th	
2 March 2008	Stoke City	H	W	3–0	Leigertwood 12', 21', Buzsaky 56'	13,398	15th	
5 March 2008	Coventry City	A	D	0–0		15,225	15th	
8 March 2008	Sheffield Wednesday	A	L	1–2	Delaney 15'	18,555	15th	
11 March 2008	Blackpool	H	W	3–2	Buzsaky 11', Vine 40', Rowlands 47'	11,538	12th	
15 March 2008	Scunthorpe United	H	W	3–1	Rowlands 43' pen., Agyemang 79', Vine 90'	14,499	12th	
22 March 2008	Wolverhampton Wanderers	A	D	3–3	Buzsaky 28', Blackstock 49' pen., Leigertwood 79'	24,290	14th	
29 March 2008	Ipswich Town	A	D	0–0		24,517	15th	
5 April 2008	Preston North End	H	D	2–2	Ainsworth 90', Blackstock 90'	14,966	15th	
12 April 2008	Hull City	A	D	1–1	Blackstock 14'	22,468	14th	
19 April 2008	Charlton Athletic	H	W	1–0	Blackstock 15'	17,035	14th	
26 April 2008	Norwich City	A	L	0–3		25,497	14th	
4 May 2008	West Bromwich Albion	H	L	0–2		18,309	14th	

=== FA Cup ===
FA Cup match details
Round	Date	Opponent	Venue	Result	Score F–A	Scorers	Attendance	Ref.
Third round	5 January 2008	Chelsea	A	L	0–1		41,289	

=== League Cup ===
League Cup match details
Round	Date	Opponent	Venue	Result	Score F–A	Scorers	Attendance	Ref.
First round	14 October 2007	Leyton Orient	H	L	1–2	Rowlands 68'	5,260	

== Statistics ==
=== Goalscorers ===
Rank	Player	Position	Championship	League Cup	FA Cup	Total
1	(Hungary) Ákos Buzsáky	MF	10	0	0	10
2	(Ghana) Patrick Agyemang	FW	9	0	0	9
3	(England) Martin Rowlands	MF	6	1	0	7
4	(England) Rowan Vine	FW	6	0	0	6
=	(England) Dexter Blackstock	FW	6	0	0	6
6	(Jamaica) Damion Stewart	FW	5	0	0	5
=	(England) Mikele Leigertwood	MF	5	0	0	5
8	(England) Gareth Ainsworth	MF	3	0	0	3
9	(England) Hogan Ephraim	MF	2	0	0	2
=	(England) Adam Bolder	MF	2	0	0	2
11	(England) Stefan Moore	FW	1	0	0	1
=	(Denmark) Marc Nygaard	FW	1	0	0	1
=	(England) Scott Sinclair	MF	1	0	0	1
=	(England) Gavin Mahon	MF	1	0	0	1
=	(Colombia) Ángelo Balanta	MF	1	0	0	1
=	(Republic of Ireland) Damien Delaney	DF	1	0	0	1
TOTAL			60	1	0	61

=== Clean sheets ===
Rank	Player	Position	Championship	League Cup	FA Cup	Total
1	(England) Lee Camp	GK	14	0	0	14
