= 2005–06 Queens Park Rangers F.C. season =

English football club season

Queens Park Rangers
2005–06 season
- Chairman: Gianni Paladini
- Manager: Ian Holloway (until 2 February); Gary Waddock (from 6 February)
- Stadium: Loftus Road
- Championship: 21st
- FA Cup: Third round
- League Cup: First round
- Top goalscorer: Nygaard/Ainsworth (9)
- Highest home attendance: 16,152 (vs Watford, 22 April 2006)
- Lowest home attendance: 10,901 (vs Preston North End, 22 November 2005)
- Average home league attendance: 13,441
- Biggest win: 3-0 Vs Norwich City (22 October 2005)
- Biggest defeat: 0-3 Vs Coventry City (20 August 2005)
Home colours	Away colours

During the 2005–06 English football season, Queens Park Rangers F.C. competed in the Football League Championship.

== Season summary ==
In the 2005–06 season, QPR struggled to build on the previous years' successes and on 6 February 2006, Holloway was suspended amidst rumours of his departure for Leicester City. He was replaced by a former player; the popular Gary Waddock. The 2005–06 season overall was difficult for QPR both on and off the pitch as financial troubles and boardroom issues combined with a series of poor performances and defeats. However, until the sacking of Ian Holloway, they had been secure in mid-table, it was only a winless run from the end of February to the end of the season, saw QPR drop to 21st.

Off the pitch there was a scandal involving the directors, shareholders and other interested parties which emerged during the 2005–06 season, following allegations of blackmail and threats of violence against the club's chairman Gianni Paladini, who was allegedly held at gunpoint during a match at Loftus Road by hired thugs at the instigation of rival directors. He was later reported to have received threats and was, for a time, wearing a bullet-proof vest. The chairman also launched a strong attack against some critics who he claimed were seeking to destroy the club.

In an unrelated incident youth team footballer Kiyan Prince was murdered on 18 May 2006.

== Final league table ==
Pos	Team	Pld	W	D	L	GF	GA	GD	Pts	Promotion, qualification or relegation
19	Sheffield Wednesday	46	13	13	20	39	52	−13	52	
20	Derby County	46	10	20	16	53	67	−14	50	
21	Queens Park Rangers	46	12	14	20	50	65	−15	50	
22	Crewe Alexandra (R)	46	9	15	22	57	86	−29	42	Relegation to Football League One
23	Millwall (R)	46	8	16	22	35	62	−27	40	Relegation to Football League One

Updated to match(es) played on 2 December 2011. Source: RSSSF
Rules for classification: 1) points; 2) goal difference; 3) number of goals scored.
(R) Relegated

== Results ==
Queens Park Rangers' score comes first

=== Legend ===
Win	Draw	Loss

=== Football League Championship ===
Date	Opponents	Venue	Result F–A	Attendance	Scorers
6 August 2005	Hull City	A	0–0	22,201	
9 August 2005	Ipswich Town	H	2–1	14,632	Gallen 37', Rowlands 45'
13 August 2005	Sheffield United	H	2–1	13,497	Bircham 56', Moore 90'
20 August 2005	Coventry City	A	0–3	23,000	
26 August 2005	Sheffield Wednesday	H	0–0	12,131	
30 August 2005	Wolverhampton Wanderers	A	1–3	22,426	Gallen 12'
10 September 2005	Southampton	A	1–1	25,744	Shittu 32'
13 September 2005	Luton Town	H	1–0	13,492	Cook 58'
17 September 2005	Leeds United	H	0–1	15,523	
24 September 2005	Leicester City	A	2–1	20,148	Nygaard 12', Furlong 86'
27 September 2005	Millwall	A	1–1	10,322	Nygaard 25'
3 October 2005	Crystal Palace	H	1–3	13,433	Ainsworth 19'
15 October 2005	Preston North End	A	1–1	13,660	Shittu 62'
18 October 2005	Plymouth Argyle	H	1–1	11,741	Gallen 69' (pen)
22 October 2005	Norwich City	H	3–0	15,976	Nygaard 11', Furlong 18', Santos 42'
29 October 2005	Derby County	A	2–1	24,447	Ainsworth 30', Gallen 80'
1 November 2005	Watford	A	1–3	16,476	Shittu 90'
5 November 2005	Reading	H	1–2	15,347	Cook 47'
19 November 2005	Plymouth Argyle	A	1–3	13,213	Baidoo 61'
22 November 2005	Preston North End	H	0–2	10,901	
26 November 2005	Hull City	H	2–2	13,185	Ainsworth 56', 66'
3 December 2005	Stoke City	A	2–1	15,367	Furlong 2', Langley 52' (pen)
10 December 2005	Ipswich Town	A	2–2	24,628	Moore 26', Furlong 42'
19 December 2005	Coventry City	H	0–1	13,556	
26 December 2005	Brighton & Hove Albion	A	0–1	7,341	
28 December 2005	Cardiff City	H	1–0	12,329	Nygaard 46'
31 December 2005	Crewe Alexandra	A	4–3	5,687	Cook 35', Baidoo 37', Rowlands 57', Langley 81'
2 January 2006	Burnley	H	1–1	12,565	Ainsworth 45'
14 January 2006	Southampton	H	1–0	15,494	Langley 21' (pen)
21 January 2006	Luton Town	A	0–2	9,797	
31 January 2006	Leicester City	H	2–3	11,785	Ainsworth 6', Shittu 83'
4 February 2006	Leeds United	A	0–2	21,807	
11 February 2006	Millwall	H	1–0	12,355	Nygaard 56'
14 February 2006	Crystal Palace	A	1–2	17,550	Furlong 56'
18 February 2006	Stoke City	H	PP		
25 February 2006	Sheffield United	A	3–2	25,360	Nygaard 6', Morgan (own goal) 56', Furlong 74'
4 March 2006	Wolverhampton Wanderers	H	0–0	14,731	
11 March 2006	Sheffield Wednesday	A	1–1	22,788	Bircham 43'
18 March 2006	Brighton & Hove Albion	H	1–1	13,907	Ainsworth 13'
25 March 2006	Cardiff City	A	0–0	14,271	
29 March 2006	Stoke City	H	1–2	10,918	Nygaard 7'
1 April 2006	Crewe Alexandra	H	1–2	12,877	Ainsworth 90'
8 April 2006	Burnley	A	0–1	11,247	
15 April 2006	Derby County	H	1–1	12,606	Nygaard 59'
17 April 2006	Norwich City	A	2–3	24,126	Ainsworth 45', Cook 61'
22 April 2006	Watford	H	1–2	16,152	Nygaard 39' (pen)
30 April 2006	Reading	A	1–2	23,156	Furlong 72'

=== FA Cup ===
Round	Date	Opponent	Venue	Result F–A	Attendance	Scorers
R3	7 January 2006	Blackburn Rovers	A	0–3	12,705	

=== League Cup ===
Round	Date	Opponent	Venue	Result F–A	Attendance	Scorers
R1	23 August 2005	Northampton Town	A	0–3	4,537	

=== Friendlies ===
Friendly match details
Date		Opponents	Venue	Result F–A	Scorers	Attendance
11 July 2005	Copa Ibiza Tournament	Sant Antoni	A	5-0		
14 July 2005	Copa Ibiza Tournament	Coventry City	A	3-2	Sturridge 2, Gallen	
17 July 2005		Aldershot	A			
23 July 2005		Iran	H	3-0	Furlong, Ainsworth, Santos	
26 July 2005		Charlton Athletic	H	0-3		
30 July 2005		Birmingham City	H			
3 January 2006		Tottenham Hotspur	A			
16 January 2006		AFC Wimbledon	A			
24 January 2006		Chelsea	A			

== Players ==
=== First-team squad ===
Squad at end of season

Note: Flags indicate national team as defined under FIFA eligibility rules; some limited exceptions apply. Players may hold more than one non-FIFA nationality.

No.	Pos.	Nation	Player
1	GK	ENG	Simon Royce
2	DF	ENG	Marcus Bignot
3	DF	ITA	Mauro Milanese
4	DF	ENG	Ian Evatt
5	DF	NGA	Danny Shittu
6	MF	NIR	Tommy Doherty (Note: Doherty was born in Bristol, England, but also qualified to represent Northern Ireland internationally through his grandfather and represented the Northern Ireland B team before making his international debut for Northern Ireland in June 2003.)
7	MF	ENG	Matthew Rose
8	MF	CAN	Marc Bircham (Note: Bircham was born in Brent, England, but also qualified to represent Canada internationally through his grandfather and made his international debut for Canada in April 1999.)
9	FW	ENG	Dean Sturridge
10	FW	ENG	Kevin Gallen
11	MF	ENG	Gareth Ainsworth
12	GK	ENG	Jake Cole
14	MF	IRL	Martin Rowlands (Note: Rowlands was born in Hammersmith and Fulham, England, but also qualified to represent the Republic of Ireland internationally and represented them at U-21 level before making his international debut for the Republic of Ireland in 2004.)
15	MF	CPV	Georges Santos (Note: Santos was born in Marseille, France, but also qualified to represent Cape Verde internationally through his parents and made his international debut for Cape Verde in September 2002.)
16	FW	DEN	Sammy Youssouf

No.	Pos.	Nation	Player
17	MF	ENG	Lee Cook
18	FW	ENG	Stefan Moore
19	DF	POL	Marcin Kuś (on loan from Polonia Warsaw)
20	DF	ENG	Dominic Shimmin
21	GK	WAL	Paul Jones
22	DF	ENG	Matthew Hislop
23	MF	ENG	Stefan Bailey
27	FW	ENG	Scott Donnelly
28	FW	ENG	Shabazz Baidoo
29	FW	ENG	Paul Furlong
30	FW	DEN	Marc Nygaard
31	MF	NIR	Steve Lomas (Note: Lomas was born in Hanover, West Germany (now Germany), but was raised in Northern Ireland from the age of 2 and made his international debut for Northern Ireland in 1994.)
32	DF	ITA	Ugo Ukah (Note: Ukah was born in Parma, Italy, but also qualifies to represent Nigeria internationally and would make his international debut for Nigeria in 2011.)
36	FW	ENG	Ray Jones
40	MF	ENG	Richard Langley (Note: Langley was born in Brent, England, but also qualified to represent Jamaica internationally through his father and made his international debut for Jamaica in 2002.)

=== Left club during season ===
Note: Flags indicate national team as defined under FIFA eligibility rules; some limited exceptions apply. Players may hold more than one non-FIFA nationality.

No.	Pos.	Nation	Player
16	MF	ENG	Marcus Bean (Note: Bean was born in Hammersmith and Fulham, England, but also qualifies to represent Jamaica internationally through his parents and would make his international debut for Jamaica in October 2011.) (to Blackpool)
19	FW	ENG	Aaron Brown (to Swindon Town)
21	MF	ENG	Adam Miller (to Stevenage Borough)
21	GK	ENG	Phil Barnes (on loan from Sheffield United)

No.	Pos.	Nation	Player
33	MF	ENG	Lloyd Dyer (on loan from West Bromwich Albion)
33	DF	ENG	Andy Taylor (on loan from Blackburn Rovers)
36	FW	ENG	Leon Clarke (on loan from Wolverhampton Wanderers)
37	DF	ENG	Keith Lowe (on loan from Wolverhampton Wanderers)

=== Reserve squad ===
Note: Flags indicate national team as defined under FIFA eligibility rules; some limited exceptions apply. Players may hold more than one non-FIFA nationality.

No.	Pos.	Nation	Player
24	DF	COD	Patrick Kanyuka
25	FW	ENG	Luke Townsend
26	DF	ENG	Ryan Johnson

No.	Pos.	Nation	Player
33	DF	ENG	Jon Munday
34	DF	ENG	Andrew Howell
35	GK	ENG	Sean Thomas

== Squad Stats ==
Position		Nationality	Name	League		FA Cup		League Cup		Total	
Position	Squad Number	Nationality	Name	Apps	Goals	Apps	Goals	Apps	Goals	Apps	Goals
GK	1	ENG	Simon Royce							32	
GK	21	WAL	Paul Jones							14	
GK	12	ENG	Jake Cole							1	
GK	21	ENG	Phil Barnes							1	
GK	35	ENG	Sean Thomas								
DF	7	ENG	Matthew Rose							16	
DF	2	ENG	Marcus Bignot							45	
DF	3	ITA	Mauro Milanese							24	
DF	5	NGA	Danny Shittu							46	4
DF	24	DRC	Pat Kanyuka								
DF	4	ENG	Ian Evatt							22	
DF	16	ENG	Marcus Bean							5	
DF	34	ENG	Andrew Howell								
DF	26	ENG	Ryan Johnson								
DF	33	ENG	Jon Munday								
DF	22	ENG	Matthew Hislop							1	
DF	37	ENG	Keith Lowe							1	
DF	33	ENG	Andy Taylor							1	
DF	32	NIG	Ugo Ukah							1	
DF	20	ENG	Dominic Shimmin							2	
DF	19	POL	Marcin Kuś							3	
DF	31	NIR	Steve Lomas							18	
MF	15	CPV	Georges Santos							26	1
MF	21	ENG	Adam Miller							2	
MF	40	JAM	Richard Langley							23	3
MF	14	IRE	Martin Rowlands							13	2
MF	8	ENG	Marc Bircham							25	2
MF	27	ENG	Scott Donnelly							3	
MF	11	ENG	Gareth Ainsworth							33	9
MF	17	ENG	Lee Cook							35	4
MF	23	ENG	Stefan Bailey							5	
MF	6	ENG	Tommy Doherty							14	
MF	33	ENG	Lloyd Dyer							15	
FW	29	ENG	Paul Furlong							32	7
FW	9	ENG	Dean Sturridge							6	
FW	28	ENG	Shabazz Baidoo							7	2
FW	25	ENG	Luke Townsend								
FW	19	ENG	Aaron Brown							2	
FW	10	ENG	Kevin Gallen							19	4
FW	36	ENG	Ray Jones							2	
FW	36	ENG	Leon Clarke							1	
FW	16	DEN	Sammy Youssouf							2	
FW	18	ENG	Stefan Moore							12	2
FW	30	DEN	Marc Nygaard							20	9
