= Czerkas =

Czerkas is a surname. Notable people with this surname include:

- Adam Czerkas (born 1984), a Polish former football player
- Stephen A. Czerkas (1951 – 2015), an American palaeontologist
