= Stefan Moore =

English footballer (born 1983)

Personal information
- Full name: Stefan Leroy Moore
- Date of birth: 28 September 1983 (age 43)
- Place of birth: Birmingham, England
- Height: 5 ft 10 in (1.78 m)
- Position: Striker

Youth career
- Romulus
- 1998–2001: Aston Villa

Senior career*
Years	Team	Apps	(Gls)
2001–2005	Aston Villa	22	(2)
2001	→ Chesterfield (loan)	2	(0)
2004	→ Millwall (loan)	6	(0)
2005	→ Leicester City (loan)	7	(0)
2005–2008	Queens Park Rangers	39	(3)
2006	→ Port Vale (loan)	12	(1)
2008	Walsall	5	(1)
2008–2009	Kidderminster Harriers	16	(1)
2009	Silhill 4th XI		
2009–2010	Halesowen Town	49	(38)
2010–2012	St Neots Town	80	(68)
2012–2014	Leamington	42	(24)
2013	→ Brackley Town (dual registration)	0	(0)
2014	Brackley Town	19	(12)
2014	Leamington	19	(8)
2014–2016	Solihull Moors	64	(13)
2016	→ Brackley Town (loan)	1	(0)
2016–2017	Corby Town		
2017–2018	Leamington	16	(2)
2018	Redditch United		
2018	Tamworth	3	(0)
2018–2019	Highgate United		
Total		402	(173)

International career
1998–1999	England U15		
1999–2000	England U16	8	(0)
2000–2001	England U17	3	(0)
2001	England U19	2	(0)
- * Club domestic league appearances and goals

Stefan Leroy Moore (born 28 September 1983) is an English former professional footballer who played as a striker. He is a product of the Aston Villa Academy, where he came through the ranks with his younger brother, Luke Moore, who went on to play for Aston Villa and other teams in the Premier League. Dropping into non-League football in his mid-twenties, Moore became a prolific goalscorer at that level.

Moore started his career as a youth playing for Romulus before joining Aston Villa's academy, captaining them to win the FA Youth Cup in 2002. Moore played for Aston Villa in the Premier League before going on loan spells to Football League clubs Chesterfield, Millwall and Leicester City. He then joined Queens Park Rangers where he played for three years, making 39 appearances in the League. He was loaned out to Port Vale in 2006 before joining Walsall, Kidderminster Harriers, and Halesowen Town.

He joined St Neots Town in 2010. He helped the club to the United Counties League Premier Division title and Huntingdonshire Senior Cup in 2010–11 and the Southern League Central Division title in 2011–12. He joined Leamington in December 2012 and was dual-registered with Brackley Town four months later. Leamington won the Southern League title in 2012–13. He joined Solihull Moors in December 2014 and helped the club to win promotion as champions of the National League North in 2015–16. He spent parts of the 2016–17 season with Brackley Town and Corby Town, and Leamington, helping Leamington to win promotion out of the Southern League Premier Division. He joined Tamworth via Redditch United in September 2018 before ending the year at Highgate United, where he later retired from semi-professional football.

== Career ==
=== Aston Villa ===
Moore played for Romulus as a youth player before joining Aston Villa as an associated schoolboy, moving onto Youth Training Scheme status in April 2000 and turning professional in October 2001. Whilst at Aston Villa, Moore captained Villa's youth in the FA Youth Cup final in 2002, and was named as man of the match as Villa beat Everton 4–1. Moore also picked up numerous caps for England youth sides at this time up to under-19 level.

Tall, quick and good on the ball, Moore has all the attributes necessary to succeed in the Premiership but is being treated with kid gloves by his manager.

— In January 2003, Moore was ranked alongside young starlets such as Wayne Rooney.

During the 2001–02 season, Villa loaned Moore out to Second Division side Chesterfield. He made his professional debut on 27 October, as Chesterfield were defeated 1–0 by Blackpool; Moore was substituted in the 72nd-minute for Sean Parrish. He went on to play two more matches for Chesterfield in the Football League Trophy and Second Division, before being recalled by Villa at the end of the one month.

He broke into the Villa first-team in 2002–03. Firstly, in the summer of 2002, he played twice in the UEFA Intertoto Cup, against Swiss side FC Zürich and French club Lille OSC. He scored on the Premier League debut, a 75th minute substitute for Marcus Allbäck, he put an "18 yards (16 m) screamer" past Charlton Athletic's Dean Kiely on 11 September at Villa Park. He made a further 14 appearances that season, playing at grounds such as Old Trafford and Anfield. A knee injury midway through the season caused manager Graham Taylor to insist on an extended rest period for the young midfielder. During this down-time he signed a three-and-a-half-year contract with the club.

Villa had a much improved season in 2003–04, and Moore found a first-team place more difficult to achieve. He made twelve appearances, eight of which were in the Premiership. On 20 December, he got onto the scoresheet at Blackburn Rovers' Ewood Park on the 62nd minute, five minutes later he was replaced by Darius Vassell as Villa held out for a 2–0 win. In January his career was on the rocks following a damaging ankle injury.

At the start of the 2004–05 season, he joined Championship club Millwall on loan. He played seven games for the "Lions", including a 1–1 draw with Ferencvárosi TC in the UEFA Cup First round. His spell at The Den ended in early October, though David O'Leary only used him once – replacing Carlton Cole 54 minutes into a 1–0 home defeat by Manchester United on 28 December. In March, Moore returned to the Championship with Leicester City. He played seven games, but only got two starts for the "Foxes". At the end of the season, he joined Ian Holloway's Queens Park Rangers on a free transfer, putting pen to paper on a three-year deal.

=== Queens Park Rangers ===
He played 27 games in 2005–06, scoring goals against Sheffield United and Ipswich Town. At the start of the 2006–07 season he joined Martin Foyle's Port Vale on a one-month loan, down in League One. He made 15 appearances, scoring once against Northampton Town, his spell being extended numerous times, before returning to Loftus Road at the end of 2006. He played just three games for a struggling QPR side in April. Moore made twelve appearances at the start of the 2007–08 season, making the scoresheet in a 1–1 draw with Watford. In early 2008, he was let go by the club and in late February signed with Walsall, following a trial spell.

"Stefan is a very intelligent frontman. I have known him for a long time and know what he's capable of. His movement is excellent and he will get into the right positions to score goals."

— Walsall boss Richard Money upon signing Moore.

He scored four minutes into his debut for the "Saddlers" in what was the only goal at Luton Town's Kenilworth Road on 1 March. He made a further four appearances that month before losing his first-team spot and getting released in the summer. In April 2008, Moore had an unsuccessful trial with Australian A-League side Melbourne Victory for two-weeks, turning out in a match against Whittlesea Zebras.

=== Non-League ===
He left English Football League, signing with Conference National side Kidderminster Harriers on a short-term contract in October 2008, following an injury to star striker Justin Richards. After staying at the club on rolling monthly contracts, he signed a more permanent deal in January. Moore scored his first league goal for Kidderminster Harriers away at Forest Green Rovers on 7 April, where he scored an equaliser for Kidderminster to earn a point. However, he made just 19 appearances in 2008–09 and was later released.

Moore joined up with Solihull-based side Silhill, playing with their fourth team, Silhill Fourth XI, in the Birmingham and District AFA League Division Five, in an attempt to maintain fitness. He debuted in a 4–2 win against Parkfield Amateur Seconds. He followed this up with a hat-trick against Meriden Athletic the following week in a 6–1 win, helping the Sils' fourth string to a record-high seventh position in the league. He then signed for Southern League Premier Division club Halesowen Town. In September 2009, Moore was linked with a move to Farnborough, but stayed and managed to score 20 goals in his first 20 league appearances (along with two more in two Southern League Cup matches). He ended the 2009–10 season with 39 league goals.

Moore was the subject of a transfer offer from Brackley Town at the end of the 2009–10 season, with the club offering him a reported £1,000 per week to join them. After a season finishing just outside the play-off positions despite facing a 10-point deduction for going into administration, Moore criticised the owners of the club in the local newspaper Halesowen News. He claimed that the owners "do not really know what they are doing" and commented on their "lack of ambition". Halesowen responded with an official club statement via their website, stating that they had fined Moore one month's wages for his actions. Moreover, the club said they would be reporting two Football League clubs for making illegal approaches to sign Moore.

In October 2010, Moore was signed by United Counties League side St Neots Town for a reported five-figure fee, signing a two-and-a-half-year contract. The club breezed to the top of the table, breaking every record in the United Counties League, including 160 goals in a season and a 13–0 win at Yaxley. This won them promotion into the Southern League Division One Central for the 2011–12 season. They also won the Huntingdonshire Senior Cup after beating St Ives Town. They won the Division One Central title to claim a second successive promotion. He joined Leamington in December 2012, and scored three goals in his debut match against Bedworth United on 1 January 2013. Moore signed for Conference North side Brackley Town on 25 March 2012 in a dual registration deal with Leamington. He made his debut two days later in a 1–1 draw with Halesowen Town. Leamington won the Southern League title in 2012–13, whilst Brackley qualified for the play-offs with a third-place finish. He left Leamington to play solely for Brackley in January 2014. He scored 12 goals in 19 league games for the "Saints" in the 2013–14 campaign, and was named the Conference North Player of the Month for December. Moore returned to Leamington in May 2014 having turned down an extended contract offer from Brackley Town.

In December 2014, Moore joined Conference North side Solihull Moors. The "Moors" finished in 12th place in 2014–15, before going on to win promotion as champions in 2015–16. He returned to Brackley Town for a brief loan spell in the 2016–17 season. He joined Corby Town of the Northern Premier League Premier Division on loan on 1 November 2016. Manager Gary Mills said the signing showed "great intent". He rejoined Leamington on dual registration in March 2017. The club secured promotion out of the Southern League Premier Division after beating Hitchin Town 2–1 in the play-off final at the end of the 2016–17 season. He scored two goals in ten games across the 2017–18 campaign as Leamington consolidated their National League North status.

On 8 August 2018, Moore joined Southern League Premier Division Central side Redditch United on a one-year deal;"Reds" manager Paul Davis said he was a "magnificent capture" and a "game-changing" player. On 26 September, he switched to league rivals Tamworth, who were managed by former St Neots Town boss Dennis Greene; he had previously had a trial at The Lamb Ground in the summer but was not offered a contract by head coach Mike Fowler. He joined Midland League Premier Division club Highgate United on dual registration in December 2018. The "Gate" finished 14th in the 2018–19 season.

== Personal life ==
He attended Hodge Hill Sports and Enterprise College, in Hodge Hill, Birmingham. He has a younger brother, Luke Moore who is a professional footballer. The two were teammates at Aston Villa. Moore owned a taxi firm in Water Orton, Warwickshire, before selling it in 2015.

Moore's son, Kobei, joined Aston Villa at Under-9 level and turned professional at the club in May 2023.

== Career statistics ==
Appearances and goals by club, season and competition
Club	Season	League			FA Cup		Other		Total	
Club	Season	Division	Apps	Goals	Apps	Goals	Apps	Goals	Apps	Goals
Aston Villa	2000–01	Premier League	0	0	0	0	0	0	0	0
Aston Villa	2002–03	Premier League	13	1	0	0	4	0	17	1
Aston Villa	2003–04	Premier League	8	1	1	0	3	0	12	1
Aston Villa	2004–05	Premier League	1	0	0	0	0	0	1	0
Aston Villa	2005–06	Premier League	0	0	0	0	0	0	0	0
Aston Villa	Total		22	2	1	0	7	0	30	2
Chesterfield (loan)	2001–02	Second Division	2	0	0	0	1	0	3	0
Millwall (loan)	2004–05	Championship	6	0	0	0	1	0	7	0
Leicester City (loan)	2004–05	Championship	7	0	0	0	0	0	7	0
Queens Park Rangers	2005–06	Championship	25	2	1	0	1	0	27	2
Queens Park Rangers	2006–07	Championship	3	0	0	0	0	0	3	0
Queens Park Rangers	2007–08	Championship	11	1	0	0	1	0	12	1
Queens Park Rangers	Total		39	3	1	0	2	0	42	3
Port Vale (loan)	2006–07	League One	12	1	1	0	2	0	15	1
Walsall	2007–08	Second Division	5	1	0	0	0	0	5	1
Kidderminster Harriers	2008–09	Conference National	16	1	3	1	0	0	19	2
Halesowen Town	2009–10	Southern League Premier Division	41	34	0	0	3	4	44	38
Halesowen Town	2010–11	Southern League Premier Division	8	4	0	0	0	0	8	4
Halesowen Town	Total		49	38	0	0	3	4	52	42
St Neots Town	2010–11	United Counties League Premier Division	24	26	0	0	6	9	30	35
St Neots Town	2011–12	Southern League Division One Central	38	33	1	0	8	7	47	40
St Neots Town	2012–13	Southern League Division One Central	18	9	2	1	1	0	21	10
St Neots Town	Total		80	68	3	1	15	16	98	85
Leamington	2012–13	Southern League Premier Division	24	13	0	0	3	1	27	14
Leamington	2013–14	Conference North	18	11	0	0	5	2	23	13
Leamington	Total		42	24	0	0	8	3	50	27
Brackley Town	2013–14	Conference North	19	12	0	0	0	0	19	12
Leamington	2014–15	Conference North	19	8	3	0	2	1	24	9
Solihull Moors	2014–15	Conference North	23	1	0	0	0	0	23	1
Solihull Moors	2015–16	National League North	32	12	0	0	0	0	32	12
Solihull Moors	2016–17	National League	9	0	0	0	0	0	9	0
Solihull Moors	Total		64	13	0	0	0	0	64	13
Brackley Town (loan)	2016–17	National League North	1	0	1	0	0	0	2	0
Leamington	2016–17	Southern League Premier Division	6	0	0	0	2	0	8	0
Leamington	2017–18	National League North	10	2	0	0	0	0	10	2
Leamington	2018–19	National League North	0	0	0	0	0	0	0	0
Leamington	Total		16	2	0	0	2	0	18	2
Tamworth	2018–19	Southern League Premier Central	3	0	0	0	2	0	5	0
Career total			402	173	13	2	45	24	460	199

== Honours ==
Individual

- Conference North Player of the Month: December 2013

Aston Villa

- FA Youth Cup: 2002

St Neots Town

- United Counties League Premier Division: 2010–11
- Huntingdonshire Senior Cup: 2011
- Southern League Division One Central: 2011–12

Leamington

- Southern League Premier Division: 2012–13
- Southern League Premier Division play-offs: 2017

Solihull Moors

- National League North: 2015–16
