= Ralf Pedersen =

Danish footballer (born 1973)

Personal information
- Date of birth: 20 September 1973 (age 53)
- Place of birth: Skelhøje, Denmark
- Height: 1.89 m (6 ft 2 in)
- Position: Defender

Team information
- Current team: OB (assistant)

Senior career*
Years	Team	Apps	(Gls)
1991–1995	Holstebro		
1995–2004	Viborg	247	(4)
2004–2008	Randers	107	(4)
2008–2010	Viborg	0	(0)
2010–2012	Kjellerup		

Managerial career
- 2012–2015: Kjellerup
- 2015–2017: Viborg (youth)
- * Club domestic league appearances and goals

Ralf Pedersen (born 20 September 1973) is a Danish former professional footballer who played as a defender. He is currently an assistant manager at Danish Superliga club OB.

== Career ==
On 26 August 2019, Pedersen returned to Randers FC as an assistant manager and transition coach. After just over four and a half years at Randers, the club confirmed on 21 February 2024 that Pedersen had left the club with immediate effect as he would be seeking new challenges.

On 7 March 2024, Viborg FF confirmed that Pedersen was back at the club in an assistant coaching role.

On 6 May 2026, Pedersen was appointed assistant manager at Polish club Pogoń Szczecin on a two-year contract, where he was reunited with former Randers manager Thomas Thomasberg. He remained part of Pogoń's coaching staff after Thomasberg's sacking the following month.

On 16 September 2026, Pedersen joined Thomasberg's staff at OB as an assistant.

== Honours ==
Viborg FF

- Danish Cup: 1999–2000
- Danish Super Cup: 2000

Randers

- Danish Cup: 2005–06
