= Luigi De Canio =

Italian footballer and manager

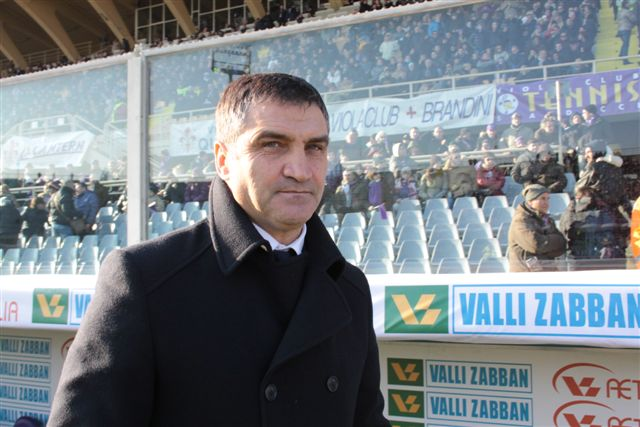
- De Canio in 2011

Personal information
- Full name: Luigi De Canio
- Date of birth: 26 September 1957 (age 69)
- Place of birth: Matera, Italy
- Height: 1.72 m (5 ft 8 in)
- Position: Full-back

Senior career*
| Years | Team | Apps | (Gls) |
| 1975–1977 | Matera | 46 | (0) |
| 1977–1978 | Brindisi | 32 | (1) |
| 1978–1979 | Matera | 32 | (0) |
| 1979–1981 | Chieti | 61 | (0) |
| 1981 | Salernitana | 3 | (0) |
| 1981–1986 | Matera | 141 | (2) |
| 1986 | Livorno | 5 | (1) |
| 1986–1987 | Galatina Pro Italia | 8 | (0) |
| 1987–1989 | Pisticci | | |

Managerial career
- 1988–1993: Pisticci
- 1993–1995: Savoia
- 1995–1996: Siena
- 1996–1997: Carpi
- 1997–1998: Lucchese
- 1998–1999: Pescara
- 1999–2001: Udinese
- 2001–2002: Napoli
- 2002–2003: Reggina
- 2003–2004: Genoa
- 2005–2006: Siena
- 2007–2008: Queens Park Rangers
- 2009–2011: Lecce
- 2012: Genoa
- 2013–2014: Catania
- 2016: Udinese
- 2018–2019: Ternana
- * Club domestic league appearances and goals

Luigi "Gigi" De Canio (born 26 September 1957) is an Italian football manager and a former player who played as a full-back.

== Career ==
=== Player ===
De Canio, a full back, played mostly with Serie C1 and Serie C2 teams, his lone season in Serie B being 1979–80 with Matera, marking his debut in the division on 16 September 1979 against Genoa. He retired in 1989 with amateur team Pisticci, of which he successively became head coach.

=== Coach ===
De Canio started his coaching career in 1988 with Promozione team Pisticci, immediately winning the league, being thus promoted to Serie D. He served as Pisticci boss for four more seasons before joining Serie C2 team Savoia during the 1993–94 season, and winning the promotion playoffs the following season. In 1995–96 he coached Siena of Serie C1, leading the Robur to an eighth place. In 1996–97 he signed for Serie C1 minnows Carpi, a team which featured a young Marco Materazzi among their players, and led the Emilia-Romagna side to a surprising fourth place which allowed them to play the promotion playoffs. In 1997–98 he moved to Serie B club Lucchese, hardly saving them from relegation with a final 16th place. Initially with no club for the following season, De Canio was then signed by Pescara, where he narrowly missed a surprising promotion to the top flight.

De Canio took charge of a Pescara side that had slumped to 13th place in 1997–98 and lost two of its opening three matches in 1998–99. He guided i biancoazzuri to 63 points, finishing fifth, just one point from fourth, and only missed out on promotion due to the incredible, much-discussed victory of Reggina at Torino on the last day of the season (13 June 1999), which was called a few minutes early due to a pitch invasion. Following his departure from Pescara, it finished 13th again the next season.

His impressive coaching performance with Pescara caused interest by Serie A club Udinese, which appointed him for the 1999–2000 season. His first Serie A campaign ended in an eighth place for the bianconeri and a place in the UEFA Intertoto Cup, which they successively won, thus ensuring a place in the UEFA Cup 2000–01. In 2000–01, after a very impressive start, Udinese entered into a long result crisis which brought to De Canio being sacked on 19 March 2001 following a home loss to Parma and his replacement with Luciano Spalletti, who managed to save the club from relegation.

In 2001–02, De Canio was appointed as Napoli boss with the goal to lead the azzurri back to Serie A; however he failed to do so, as Napoli ended their Serie B campaign in fifth place, six points shy of the fourth Serie A spot. He consequently left Napoli and was appointed at the helm of Reggina during the 2002–03 season replacing sacked Bortolo Mutti, maintaining their place in the Italian top flight after winning a tie-breaking playoff to Atalanta. During the 2003–04, De Canio was called to replace Roberto Donadoni at the helm of Serie B club Genoa, which were fighting to escape relegation despite their initial promotion claims, leading the club to a final 16th place in the league table. He was later sacked by Genoa only a handful days before their Serie B 2004–05 debut to appoint Serse Cosmi at his place. He was then appointed in January 2005 by Serie A minnows Siena, a team which he already coached some years earlier, to replace Luigi Simoni, leading his side to escape relegation for two consecutive seasons.

==== Queens Park Rangers ====
De Canio was announced as first team coach of English Championship team Queens Park Rangers on 29 October 2007, succeeding the recently sacked John Gregory. He started his QPR experience with a 2–0 home win to Hull City on 3 November. Rangers signed several players during the January transfer window: Ákos Buzsáky who had previously been on loan from Plymouth Argyle, Hogan Ephraim from West Ham, Kieran Lee on loan from Manchester United, Gavin Mahon on loan from Watford, Matthew Connolly from Arsenal, Patrick Agyemang from Preston and Fitz Hall from Wigan. Early in January QPR also managed to secure striker Rowan Vine in a permanent move following his brief loan spell which had ended in December. During his period in charge of the club, De Canio became a very popular figure among the QPR faithful, due to the style and flair he brought back to their game. As a result, he was, along with the club's owners, immortalised in the supporters' song "Gigi De Canio, Bernie and Flavio" (to the tune of La donna è mobile).

De Canio left the club by "mutual consent" after the end of the season in May 2008, having guided them to fourteenth place in the Championship. His record at the club comprised 12 wins, 12 losses and 11 draws in 35 games. It has reported that his return to Italy was partly due to a bid to save his marriage.

==== Back to Italy ====
On 9 March 2009 De Canio signed a contract to become head coach of Serie A relegation battlers Lecce, replacing Mario Beretta at the helm of the salentini, but did not manage to save the side from relegation. On 31 May 2009 US Lecce announced De Canio had refused to extend his contract with the club; however, on 6 June the club officially confirmed to have reached an agreement with the former QPR manager, who guided the giallorossi back to the top flight, as league runners-up, in their 2009–10 Serie B campaign. He was sacked on 22 May 2011 as Lecce finished 17th at the end of the 2010–11 season.

On 22 April 2012 he was hired again as Genoa head coach, in a desperate attempt to save the team from relegation, until 22 October 2012 when he was sacked.

On 20 October 2013, De Canio returned into management as he accepted to take over from Rolando Maran at the head of endangered Serie A club Catania.

On 15 March 2016, he was appointed manager of Udinese. He was let go at the end of the season on 19 May.

On 21 February 2018, he was appointed manager of Serie B club Ternana.

In April 2018 he was one of 77 applicants for the vacant Cameroon national team job.

He was fired by Ternana on 19 January 2019.

== Managerial statistics ==
As of 19 January 2019

Managerial record by team and tenure
| Team | Nat | From | To | Record | | | | | | | |
| Team | Nat | From | To | G | W | D | L | GF | GA | GD | Win % |
|---|---|---|---|---|---|---|---|---|---|---|---|
| Pisticci | (Italy) | 1 July 1988 | 30 June 1993 | 168 | 76 | 57 | 35 | 231 | 143 | +88 | 45.24 |
| Savoia | (Italy) | 6 December 1993 | 28 June 1995 | 61 | 21 | 29 | 11 | 61 | 49 | +12 | 34.43 |
| Siena | (Italy) | 28 June 1995 | 28 May 1996 | 42 | 15 | 13 | 14 | 51 | 43 | +8 | 35.71 |
| Carpi | (Italy) | 28 May 1996 | 20 June 1997 | 45 | 19 | 13 | 13 | 58 | 36 | +22 | 42.22 |
| Lucchese | (Italy) | 20 June 1997 | 16 June 1998 | 40 | 11 | 12 | 17 | 37 | 52 | −15 | 27.50 |
| Pescara | (Italy) | 21 September 1998 | 30 June 1999 | 35 | 17 | 9 | 9 | 48 | 37 | +11 | 48.57 |
| Udinese | (Italy) | 1 July 1999 | 19 March 2001 | 83 | 38 | 15 | 30 | 128 | 110 | +18 | 45.78 |
| Napoli | (Italy) | 29 June 2001 | 4 June 2002 | 41 | 17 | 13 | 11 | 52 | 45 | +7 | 41.46 |
| Reggina | (Italy) | 8 November 2002 | 5 June 2003 | 30 | 11 | 7 | 12 | 35 | 42 | −7 | 36.67 |
| Genoa | (Italy) | 21 September 2003 | 14 June 2004 | 43 | 13 | 16 | 14 | 57 | 57 | +0 | 30.23 |
| Siena | (Italy) | 10 January 2005 | 22 May 2006 | 62 | 17 | 21 | 24 | 76 | 99 | −23 | 27.42 |
| Queens Park Rangers | (England) | 29 October 2007 | 8 May 2008 | 35 | 12 | 11 | 12 | 50 | 46 | +4 | 34.29 |
| Lecce | (Italy) | 9 March 2009 | 1 June 2011 | 95 | 34 | 27 | 34 | 137 | 149 | −12 | 35.79 |
| Genoa | (Italy) | 23 April 2012 | 22 October 2012 | 14 | 4 | 4 | 6 | 17 | 20 | −3 | 28.57 |
| Catania | (Italy) | 20 October 2013 | 16 January 2014 | 12 | 2 | 2 | 8 | 8 | 25 | −17 | 16.67 |
| Udinese | (Italy) | 14 March 2016 | 19 May 2016 | 9 | 2 | 3 | 4 | 10 | 16 | −6 | 22.22 |
| Ternana | (Italy) | 21 February 2018 | 19 January 2019 | 38 | 13 | 10 | 15 | 54 | 50 | +4 | 34.21 |
| Career total | | | | 853 | 322 | 262 | 269 | 1,110 | 1,019 | +91 | 37.75 |

== Name spelling ==
Some sections of the media, particularly the English language media commonly misspell his surname as Di Canio, instead of the correct De Canio.
