= Martin Rowlands =

Irish footballer

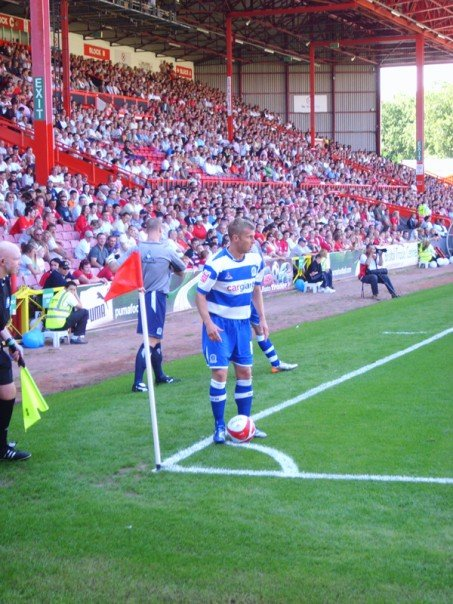
- Rowlands in 2007

Personal information
- Full name: Martin Charles Rowlands
- Date of birth: 8 February 1979 (age 47)
- Place of birth: Hammersmith, London, England
- Height: 5 ft 9 in (1.75 m)
- Position: Midfielder

Youth career
- 1995–1997: Wycombe Wanderers

Senior career*
Years	Team	Apps	(Gls)
1997–1998	Farnborough Town	39	(7)
1998–2003	Brentford	152	(20)
2003–2012	Queens Park Rangers	198	(33)
2011	→ Millwall (loan)	1	(0)
2011	→ Wycombe Wanderers (loan)	10	(0)
2012	Colchester United	9	(2)
2012–2013	Leyton Orient	33	(4)
2013–2014	Aldershot Town	36	(2)
Total		478	(68)

International career
1999–2000	Republic of Ireland U21	8	(1)
2004–2009	Republic of Ireland	5	(0)
- * Club domestic league appearances and goals

Martin Charles Rowlands (born 8 February 1979) is a former professional footballer who played as a midfielder. Born in England, he has represented Ireland at youth level.

== Club career ==
After starring for Heston Gaels GAA club at underage level, Rowlands started his football career at Wycombe Wanderers, but did not earn a professional contract and joined Farnborough Town in 1997 before moving to Brentford in August 1998 for a transfer fee of £45,000. In five seasons with Brentford, he made 186 appearances in all competitions, scoring 23 goals.

After suffering a broken leg, Queens Park Rangers manager Ian Holloway took a gamble on Rowlands and signed him on a free transfer from local rivals Brentford in the summer of 2003. This gamble paid off, as Rowlands scored 12 goals from midfield, helping his new side to promotion from the Second Division. That season, Rowlands also showed versatility, playing right back, right midfield, left midfield and centre midfield; excelling in all positions. He won both the supporters and players' player of the year competitions.

Since then, Rowlands has suffered many injuries and has never truly recaptured his outstanding form of 2003–04. However, in 2006–07 he managed to score 10 goals from midfield.

In 2007–08 he was selected captain, and was regularly among Rangers` best performers. He played 43 league games, scoring 6 goals, including a memorable brace in Rangers' 4–2 victory at Watford. He won both the Supporters' Player of the Year and the Ray Jones Players' Player of the Year award. As of January 2012 Rowlands was the longest-serving member of the Queens Park Rangers squad having spent nine years at the club.

On 25 February 2011 Rowlands signed for Millwall, on an emergency one-month loan, after only playing 23 minutes of competitive football for QPR in the 2010–11 season. On 31 January 2012, Rowlands' contract with Queens Park Rangers was terminated by mutual consent. On 2 February 2012, Rowlands signed a contract with Colchester United. After a solid three months with the U's, he was released from his contract after suffering with injuries. He made nine appearances and scored two goals during his time in Essex.

Rowlands signed on a month-long contract with Leyton Orient on 28 August 2012, after spending several weeks training with the London club, and featuring in two pre-season friendly matches.

On 22 September 2012, Rowlands scored his first Orient goal, a 20-yard volley against Crewe Alexandra at Gresty Road. The game ended 1–1. After 40 appearances and four goals in all competitions, he rejected a contract extension at the end of the 2012–13 season, and became a free agent.

Rowlands signed for Conference Premier side Aldershot Town for the 2013–14 season.

== International career ==
Following good displays with Queens Park Rangers, Rowlands was called up to the Republic of Ireland squad in the summer of 2004, playing two games. His good club form in season 2007/2008 and his subsequent player of the year awards with Queens Park Rangers led to Rowlands being included in Giovanni Trapattoni's first Republic of Ireland squad.

After a substitute appearance against Italy in Ireland's penultimate qualifying game for the 2010 World Cup, Rowlands was chosen to start for Ireland against Montenegro in their final group game.

On 14 October 2009, he injured his anterior cruciate ligament while playing for the Republic of Ireland against Montenegro, resulting in him being ruled out of the rest of the 2009–10 season for QPR.

== Personal life ==
Rowlands attended Fielding Primary School in Northfields and Drayton Manor High School. He has four brothers. Rowlands is now a football agent for the Stellar group

== Career statistics ==
=== Club ===
Appearances and goals by club, season and competition
Club	Season	League			Cup		League Cup		Other		Total	
Club	Season	Division	Apps	Goals	Apps	Goals	Apps	Goals	Apps	Goals	Apps	Goals
Farnborough Town	1996–97	Conference	5	0	0	0	—		0	0	5	0
Farnborough Town	1997–98	Conference	34	7	1	0	—		0	0	35	7
Farnborough Town	Total		39	7	1	0	—		0	0	40	7
Brentford	1998–99	Third Division	36	4	3	0	4	0	3	1	46	5
Brentford	1999–2000	Second Division	40	6	2	0	2	0	3	0	47	6
Brentford	2000–01	Second Division	32	2	1	0	4	1	6	1	43	4
Brentford	2001–02	Second Division	26	7	1	0	1	0	0	0	28	7
Brentford	2002–03	Second Division	18	1	2	0	0	0	2	0	22	1
Brentford	Total		152	20	9	0	11	1	14	2	186	23
Queens Park Rangers	2003–04	Second Division	42	10	1	0	2	2	3	1	48	12
Queens Park Rangers	2004–05	Championship	35	3	1	0	2	1	—		38	4
Queens Park Rangers	2005–06	Championship	14	2	1	0	0	0	—		15	2
Queens Park Rangers	2006–07	Championship	29	10	0	0	0	0	—		29	10
Queens Park Rangers	2007–08	Championship	44	6	1	0	1	1	—		46	7
Queens Park Rangers	2008–09	Championship	24	2	2	0	3	0	—		29	2
Queens Park Rangers	2009–10	Championship	6	0	0	0	1	0	—		7	0
Queens Park Rangers	2010–11	Championship	4	0	0	0	0	0	—		4	0
Queens Park Rangers	2011–12	Premier League	0	0	—		1	0	—		1	0
Queens Park Rangers	Total		198	33	6	0	10	4	0	0	214	37
Millwall (loan)	2010–11	Championship	1	0	—		—		—		1	0
Wycombe Wanderers (loan)	2011–12	League One	10	0	1	0	—		0	0	11	0
Colchester United	2011–12	League One	9	2	—		—		—		9	2
Leyton Orient	2012–13	League One	33	4	4	0	1	0	2	0	40	4
Aldershot Town	2013–14	Conference Premier	36	2	2	0	—		4	0	42	2
Career total			478	68	23	0	22	5	20	3	543	76

=== International ===
Appearances and goals by national team and year
National team	Year	Apps	Goals
Republic of Ireland	2004	3	0
Republic of Ireland	2005	0	0
Republic of Ireland	2006	0	0
Republic of Ireland	2007	0	0
Republic of Ireland	2008	0	0
Republic of Ireland	2009	2	0
Total		5	0

== Honours ==
Brentford

- Football League Third Division: 1998–99
- Football League Trophy runner-up: 2000–01

Queens Park Rangers

- Football League Second Division second-place promotion: 2003–04

Individual

- Brentford Supporters' Player of the Year: 1999–2000

== See also ==
- List of Republic of Ireland international footballers born outside the Republic of Ireland
