= Simon Royce =

English footballer and coach

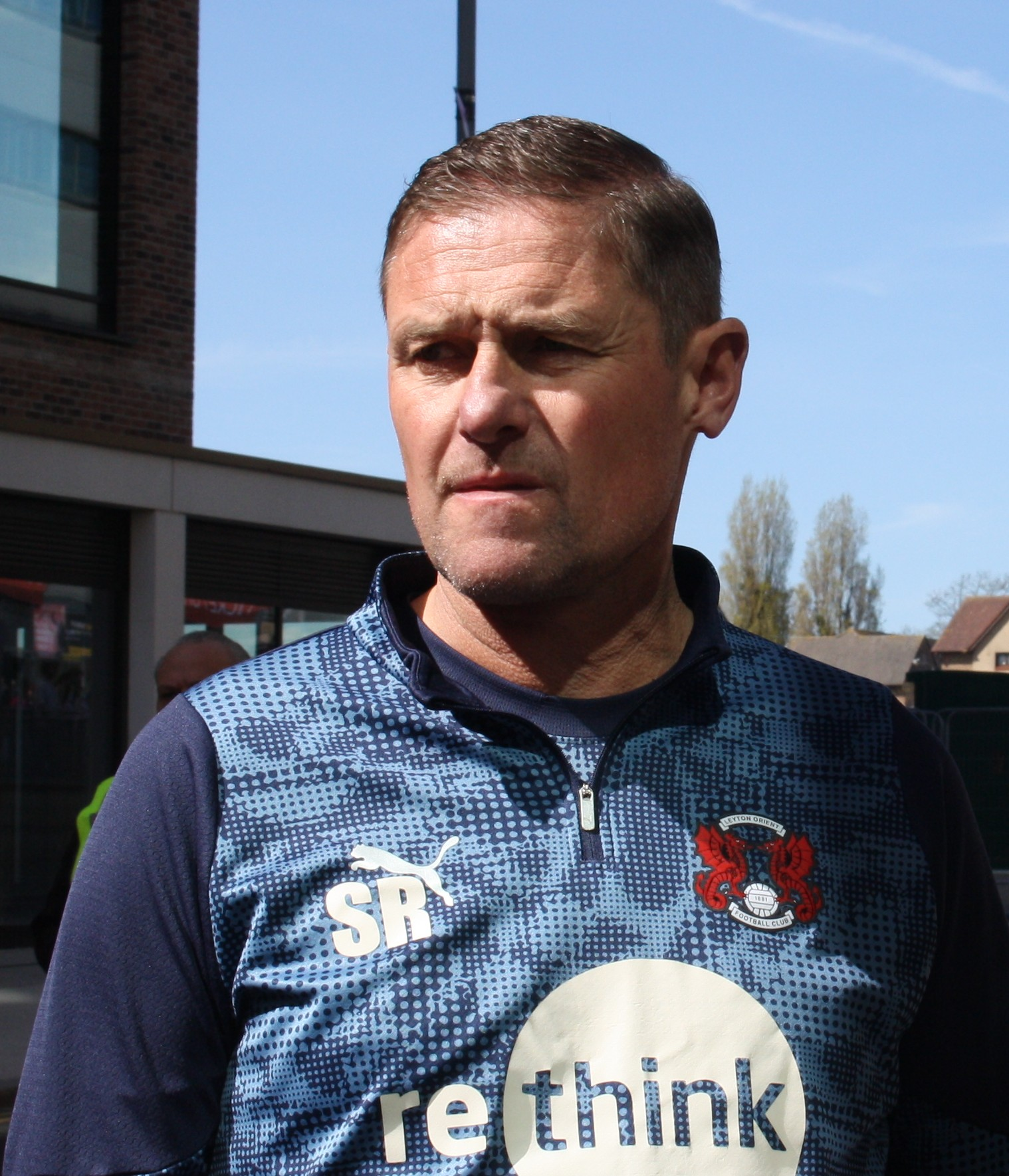
- Royce in 2026

Personal information
- Full name: Simon Ernest Royce
- Date of birth: 9 September 1971 (age 55)
- Place of birth: Forest Gate, England
- Height: 6 ft 2 in (1.88 m)
- Position: Goalkeeper

Team information
- Current team: Leyton Orient (goalkeeping coach)

Senior career*
Years	Team	Apps	(Gls)
1989–1991	Heybridge Swifts	70	(0)
1991–1998	Southend United	149	(0)
1998–2000	Charlton Athletic	8	(0)
2000–2003	Leicester City	19	(0)
2001–2002	→ Brighton & Hove Albion (loan)	6	(0)
2002	→ Manchester City (loan)	0	(0)
2002	→ Queens Park Rangers (loan)	8	(0)
2002–2003	→ Queens Park Rangers (loan)	8	(0)
2003–2005	Charlton Athletic	1	(0)
2004–2005	→ Luton Town (loan)	2	(0)
2005	→ Queens Park Rangers (loan)	13	(0)
2005–2007	Queens Park Rangers	50	(0)
2007	→ Gillingham (loan)	3	(0)
2007–2010	Gillingham	92	(0)
2010–2011	Brentford	2	(0)
2019–2020	Gillingham	0	(0)
Total		431	(0)
- * Club domestic league appearances and goals

Simon Ernest Royce (born 9 September 1971) is an English football coach and former professional footballer who is goalkeeping coach at Leyton Orient.

As a player he was a goalkeeper who played in the Premier League for Charlton Athletic and Leicester City, although he spent the rest of his career in the Football League with notable spells at Southend United, Queens Park Rangers and Gillingham. He also played for Brighton & Hove Albion, Manchester City and Luton Town. Since taking up coaching he has been registered as a back-up player for both Brentford and back with Gillingham.

== Playing career ==
Royce began his career with non-League Heybridge Swifts and after claiming the number one jersey from long standing Albie Bridge while still a teenager soon attracted the interest of many Football League sides. He joined Southend United for a £35,000 fee in October 1991 and became the first Heybridge player to be sold to a professional club. He spent a few seasons as understudy to Paul Sansome before finally establishing himself as the Shrimpers' first choice and a fans' favourite – he played in the successful Southend side in the mid 1990s under Barry Fry and later Peter Taylor before Charlton Athletic manager Alan Curbishley snapped him up on a free transfer. Despite some strong performances in the Premier League, including many clean sheets resulting in him setting a post-war club record, injury prevented Royce from establishing himself as regularly as he would have liked and, after the arrival of Dean Kiely, he rejoined former boss Peter Taylor at Leicester City. Some good early form resulted with speculation about an England call-up for new manager Sven-Goran Eriksson's initial squad, however this never materialised and further injuries prevented Royce from making as many first team appearances as he possibly could.

A second spell at Charlton followed before he moved into the lower tiers of the Football League with Queens Park Rangers, Manchester City (on loan), Luton Town (on loan) and Brighton & Hove Albion (on loan) again teaming up with Peter Taylor. During a Stoke City vs QPR game, he was attacked by a Stoke fan.

Royce joined Gillingham in April 2007 as an emergency loan signing after the Kent team were left with no fit goalkeepers for their final three matches of the season, making his debut for Gillingham in the 3–2 home win over Port Vale on 21 April 2007. In August 2007 he joined Gillingham on a free transfer, saying that he intended to see out the rest of his career at Gillingham and his performances in goal won him the Supporters' Player of the Year award for the 2007–08 season. He was first choice goalkeeper at Gillingham again in the promotion season of 2008–09 and at the beginning of the following season. He was forced out of the team by injuries sustained in a car accident in December 2009 and never regained his place from Alan Julian.

== Coaching career ==
His Gillingham contract expired at the end of that season and although he had been offered a goalkeeper/coach role at Gillingham, he opted in June 2010 to take up the role at Brentford, where he remained until the end of the 2017–18 season.

He returned to Gillingham as a goalkeeping coach in June 2019 and was listed on the bench against Oxford United due to an injury to second-choice keeper Joe Walsh. He is also one of the oldest players to appear in a football video game as an active footballer when he appeared in FIFA 20, making his first appearance in the series since FIFA 11. The Kent side announced in June 2020 that Royce would be released when his contract expired the following month. In 2021 Royce joined Leyton Orient as goalkeeping coach under Kenny Jackett.

== Career statistics ==
Club	Season	League			FA Cup		League Cup		Other		Total	
Club	Season	Division	Apps	Goals	Apps	Goals	Apps	Goals	Apps	Goals	Apps	Goals
Southend United	1996–97	First Division	43	0	1	0	1	0	—		45	0
Southend United	1997–98	Second Division	37	0	2	0	4	0	1 (Note: Appearance in the Football League Trophy)	0	44	0
Southend United	Total		149	0	5	0	9	0	6	0	169	0
Charlton Athletic	1998–99	Premier League	8	0	0	0	0	0	—		8	0
Charlton Athletic	1999–2000	First Division	0	0	0	0	0	0	—		0	0
Charlton Athletic	Total		8	0	0	0	0	0	—		8	0
Leicester City	2000–01	Premier League	19	0	4	0	1	0	—		24	0
Leicester City	2001–02	Premier League	0	0	0	0	0	0	—		0	0
Leicester City	2002–03	Premier League	0	0	0	0	0	0	—		0	0
Leicester City	Total		19	0	4	0	1	0	—		24	0
Brighton & Hove Albion (loan)	2001–02	Second Division	6	0	0	0	—		—		6	0
Manchester City (loan)	2001–02	First Division	0	0	—		—		—		0	0
Queens Park Rangers (loan)	2002–03	Second Division	16	0	0	0	0	0	1	0	17	0
Charlton Athletic	2003–04	Premier League	1	0	0	0	0	0	—		1	0
Charlton Athletic	2004–05	Premier League	0	0	0	0	0	0	—		0	0
Charlton Athletic	Total		9	0	0	0	0	0	—		9	0
Luton Town (loan)	2004–05	League One	2	0	0	0	—		—		2	0
Queens Park Rangers (loan)	2004–05	Championship	13	0	—		—		—		13	0
Queens Park Rangers	2005–06	Championship	30	0	1	0	1	0	—		32	0
Queens Park Rangers	2006–07	Championship	20	0	2	0	0	0	—		22	0
Queens Park Rangers	Total		79	0	3	0	1	0	—		83	0
Gillingham (loan)	2006–07	League One	3	0	—		—		—		3	0
Gillingham	2007–08	League One	33	0	1	0	1	0	1	0	36	0
Gillingham	2008–09	League Two	42	0	3	0	0	0	4 (Note: Three appearances in the Football League Two play-offs, one appearance in the Football League Trophy)	0	49	0
Gillingham	2009–10	League One	17	0	2	0	2	0	0	0	21	0
Gillingham	Total		92	0	6	0	3	0	5	0	106	0
Brentford	2010–11	League One	2	0	0	0	0	0	0	0	2	0
Brentford	2011–12	League One	0	0	0	0	0	0	0	0	0	0
Brentford	Total		2	0	0	0	0	0	0	0	2	0
Gillingham	2019–20	League One	0	0	0	0	0	0	0	0	0	0
Gillingham	Total		95	0	6	0	3	0	5	0	109	0
Career Total			361	0	18	0	14	0	12	0	405	0

== Honours ==
Gillingham

- Football League Two play-offs: 2009

Individual

- Southend United Player of the Season: 1995–96
- Gillingham Player of the Season: 2007–08
