= Skelhøje =

- Town
- Location within Denmark
- Coordinates: 56°21′38″N 09°17′48″E
- Country: Denmark
- Region: Central Denmark (Midtjylland)
- Municipality: Viborg
- Founded: 1906

Population (2026)
  - Total: 475
- Time zone: UTC+1 (CET)
  - Summer (DST): UTC+2 (CEST)
- Postal code: 7470 Karup J

Skelhøje is a small Danish village with a population of 475 (1 January 2026). It is located near Dollerup Hills in central Jutland.

The Herning-Viborg state railway line was opened in 1906 to develop economy in a remote part of Jutland. One of the new stations on the railway line was Skelhøje Station on a place with no inhabitants. During some decades Skelhøje grew to a place of some commercial importance with shops, dairy, bakery, slaughterhouse etc. The railway line closed in 1971. The former inn is today the community house, run by the villagers (Skelhøje Kulturhus), and with rooms for rent for hikers.
