= Adam Czerkas =

Polish footballer

Personal information
- Full name: Adam Czerkas
- Date of birth: 13 July 1984 (age 42)
- Place of birth: Sokołów Podlaski, Poland
- Height: 1.85 m (6 ft 1 in)
- Position: Striker

Youth career
- –2002: Podlasie Sokołów Podlaski

Senior career*
Years	Team	Apps	(Gls)
2002	Podlasie Sokołów Podlaski		
2002–2005	Świt Nowy Dwór Mazowiecki	25	(7)
2003–2004	→ Okęcie Warsaw (loan)		
2005–2007	Korona Kielce	13	(2)
2005–2006	→ Odra Wodzisław (loan)	23	(6)
2006	→ Queens Park Rangers (loan)	3	(0)
2007	→ Odra Wodzisław (loan)	12	(1)
2008–2009	ŁKS Łódź	20	(3)
2009–2010	GKP Gorzów Wielkopolski	15	(2)
2010–2011	Świt Nowy Dwór Mazowiecki	31	(6)
2011–2013	Pogoń Siedlce	54	(16)
2014	Legionovia Legionowo	15	(7)
2014–2015	Polonia Warsaw	13	(6)
2015	Legionovia Legionowo	6	(1)
2015–2016	Rozwój Katowice	21	(6)
2016–2019	Raków Częstochowa	57	(15)
2020	Escola Varsovia Warsaw	0	(0)
2020	Podlasie Sokołów Podlaski	4	(0)
- * Club domestic league appearances and goals

Adam Czerkas (born 13 July 1984) is a Polish former professional footballer who played as a striker.

== Club career ==
=== Early career ===
Born in Sokołów Podlaski, Czerkas started his career with Podlasie Sokołów Podlaski. He signed for Świt Nowy Dwór Mazowiecki in summer 2002, and made 9 league appearances during the 2002–03 season. He joined Okęcie Warsaw on loan in summer 2003, but returned to Świt Nowy Dwór Mazowiecki for the 2004–05 season, and scored 7 goals in 16 league games.

=== Korona Kielce ===
On 8 February 2005, Czerkas signed for Korona Kielce on a five-year contract. He scored in his first game for the club against Dyskobolia Grodzisk Wielkopolski in a friendly the following day, and scored twice in 13 II liga matches across the rest of the season.

He joined Odra Wodzisław on loan in summer 2005. He scored 8 goals, 6 in the league, during a season-long loan with the club.

On 18 July 2006, Czerkas joined Queens Park Rangers on a season-long loan. His loan was terminated in December 2006, having made just 4 appearances in all competitions. He later had an unsuccessful trial with Royal Charleroi before returning to play with Odra Wodzisław in January 2007.

He had an unsuccessful trial spell with Motherwell in July 2007.

=== Return to Poland ===
On 16 July 2008, Czerkas signed for Ekstraklasa club ŁKS Łódź on a two-year contract, following a trial spell with the club.

Łódź were denied a licence to take part in the 2009–10 Ekstraklasa and so Czerkas argued that his contract was no longer valid, as his contract was not valid outside of the Ekstraklasa. He agreed a contract with Cypricot club Enosis Neon Paralimni, but this transfer fell through due to delays with the PZPN confirming ŁKS Łódź's relegation. He had a trial with Górnik Zabrze before the PZPN did eventually confirm ŁKS Łódź were relegated and he signed for GKP Gorzów Wielkopolski on 3 September 2009. He made his debut for Gorzów Wielkopolski on 5 September, scoring their goal in a 2–1 defeat to previous club ŁKS Łódź. His contract with Gorzów was terminated in May 2010, having scored twice in 15 league matches with the club.

He returned to former club Świt Nowy Dwór Mazowiecki in July 2010.

On 13 July 2011, Czerkas signed for Pogoń Siedlce. His contract was terminated, at his request, in January 2014.

On 15 August 2014, Czerkas signed for Polonia Warsaw.

On 31 March 2015, Czerkas returned to Legionovia Legionowo.

He joined Raków Częstochowa in summer 2016, and was promoted with the club to the I liga in his first season. In summer 2017 he extended his contract with Raków by a further year. He again extended his contract by a year in June 2018. He was released at the end of the 2018–19 season, following the club's promotion back to the Ekstraklasa. He began working for Rakow as a scout following his release, and though he did register as a player for Escola Varsovia Warsaw, he did not play for the club.

In July 2020 he returned to IV liga Masovia club Podlasie Sokołów Podlaski.

== Style of play ==
Czerkas plays as a striker and has been noted for his size and strength.

== Honours ==
Korona Kielce

- II liga: 2004–05

Raków Częstochowa

- II liga: 2016–17
