= Gianni Paladini =

Italian football chairman (born 1945)

- Born: 1945 (age 80–81); Naples, Italy
- Occupations: Businessman; Football representative and agent
- Known for: Chairman of Queens Park Rangers

Gianni Paladini (born 1945) is the former chairman of Queens Park Rangers F.C. after replacing Bill Power in a boardroom coup. He originally took his position at QPR as part of a Monaco-based consortium, Wanlock LLC which acquired 30% of the club and retained his position notwithstanding the investment of Bernie Ecclestone, Flavio Briatore and Lakshmi Mittal in 2007.

== Biography ==
A promising teenage footballer, he was forced to give up the game at the age of 23, before playing a single game for his home town club Napoli.

He was first linked with a club takeover with Port Vale in December 2003, before being rejected by chairman Bill Bratt.

=== QPR ===
In June 2003, QPR announced that Moorbound Ltd had bought 22% (now diluted to 14%) of the PLC's issued shares, and giving the club a much needed cash injection of around £650,000. The deal saw Azeem Malik join the board. At that time Paladini could not join the board as he was a registered football agent. However the board of QPR were keen to meet someone who wanted to inject money into the club, and particularly since Paladini promised that Moorbound was the vehicle for another party with far more cash, and that he personally would bring stars such as Benito Carbone to Loftus Road.

On 13 August 14,000 fans turned up to see QPR play Sheffield United. Paladini arrived at the ground around 2pm with his son, daughter and grandson Gianluca, who was due to be the club's mascot that day. Paladini was allegedly threatened and attacked at the ground by a gang.

On 21 June 2006, jurors found club shareholders David Morris and John McFarlane not guilty of conspiracy to blackmail, false imprisonment and gun possession. On 28 June Judge Charles Byers told the jury to clear the other men, on the basis that, in the prosecution's case, Mr Morris had been the "essential core" of the blackmail plot and without him the case could not stand. The other defendants who denied all charges – and were all found not guilty – were: Andy Baker, 40, from North Petherton, Somerset; Aaron Lacey, 36, from Watford; David Davenport, 38, from Buckinghamshire; and Michael Reynolds, 45, from north London. Daniel Morris (David's brother) had disappeared before the trial, and a European warrant is still outstanding for his arrest.

==== After the trial ====
It was then alleged in the press that Paladini was using QPR to line the pockets of various agent friends with deals that the club could not afford. Typical is the suggestion that the acquisition of Marc Nygaard, on a free transfer from Brescia Calcio, resulted in a £60,000 payment to agent Brian Hassell. It is also claimed that £10,000 was paid to Mel Eves, a Midlands-based agent, for the transfer of Ian Evatt.

Paladini retained his position as chairman at QPR despite the investment of significant new shareholders in the latter half of 2007 and the re-organisation of the club's directors which, among other changes, included the son-in-law of billionaire Lakshmi Mittal taking a place on the board. Paladini was removed as chairman on 18 August 2011 after a takeover by Tony Fernandes and became a consultant for the club. He quit his post at Queen's Park Rangers FC on 16 November 2011.
