= Matthew Hislop =

English footballer

Personal information
- Full name: Matthew Henry Hislop
- Date of birth: 31 January 1987 (age 39)
- Place of birth: Wolverhampton, England
- Position: Defender

Youth career
- 2004–2005: Arsenal

Senior career*
Years	Team	Apps	(Gls)
2005–2007	Queens Park Rangers	1	(0)

International career
2002	England U16	2	(0)
- * Club domestic league appearances and goals

Matthew Henry Hislop (born 31 January 1987 in Wolverhampton) is an English former professional footballer who played in the Football League for Queens Park Rangers. He started his career as a youth player with Arsenal before moving to QPR in 2005.

His one and only first-team appearance for QPR was in their 2–1 win over Leicester City at the Walkers Stadium in September 2005 in a Championship match. He did originally impress but was stretchered off midway in the second half with a suspected broken ankle. Despite initial fears, the injury was not as bad as reported and he made a fairly quick recovery.

In the summer of 2006 it was announced Hislop would be leaving the club, but then was re-signed for the 2006–07 season. In January 2007 it was announced Hislop would be leaving the club by mutual consent.

== International career ==
Hislop made two appearances for the England under-16 in 2002 and featured in the Victory Shield.
