= Lee Cook =

English footballer (born 1982)

- Cook in 2026

Personal information
- Full name: Lee Cook
- Date of birth: 3 August 1982 (age 44)
- Place of birth: Hammersmith, England
- Height: 5 ft 10 in (1.78 m)
- Position: Winger

Youth career
- 1998: Southampton

Senior career*
Years	Team	Apps	(Gls)
1999	Aylesbury United	14	(2)
1999–2004	Watford	59	(7)
2002	→ York City (loan)	7	(1)
2002–2003	→ Queens Park Rangers (loan)	13	(1)
2004–2007	Queens Park Rangers	119	(9)
2007–2009	Fulham	0	(0)
2008	→ Charlton Athletic (loan)	9	(0)
2008–2009	→ Queens Park Rangers (loan)	23	(1)
2009–2012	Queens Park Rangers	27	(1)
2011–2012	→ Leyton Orient (loan)	9	(1)
2012	→ Charlton Athletic (loan)	4	(0)
2012–2013	Leyton Orient	38	(5)
2014	Apollon Smyrnis	1	(0)
2014–2015	Barnet	39	(8)
2015–2016	Eastleigh	36	(5)
Total		398	(41)
- * Club domestic league appearances and goals

Lee Cook (born 3 August 1982) is an English former professional footballer.

== Career ==
Born in Hammersmith, London, Cook began his career at Southampton before moving on to non-League club Aylesbury United where he made 19 appearances, of which 14 were in the league, scoring twice, having progressed from the club's youth team.

=== Watford ===
In 1999, after impressing in a trial period, Cook moved on to Watford. His transfer was the subject of an unsuccessful lawsuit from his former club.

Cook made his debut against Grimsby Town on 14 April 2001 as a substitute. In his fourth game for Watford he injured his knee, which kept him out of football until the end of the 2001–02 season. Cook spent most of the 2002–03 season on loan. He joined York City on a month's loan in October 2002, which was extended for another month in late October. For York, he made a total of seven appearances and scored twice, with goals against Exeter in the league and Lincoln City in the Football League Trophy. He was subsequently loaned to Queens Park Rangers in December 2002. Cook returned to Watford in March 2003, after QPR manager Ian Holloway had been hoping to sign him permanently. He scored once during 13 starts at Loftus Road. Cook made most his appearances for Watford during the 2003–04 season, playing 45 times.

=== Queens Park Rangers ===
Cook made no secret of the fact he was a fan of QPR, and he elected to leave Watford to join them at the end of his contract in July 2004. As Cook was under the age of 24 when he moved, and the two clubs failed to agree a fee, a tribunal ordered QPR to pay a fee of £125,000 to Watford. During his five-year spell at Watford he made 64 appearances and scored seven goals.

Cook's QPR debut came against Watford at Vicarage Road on 9 August 2004 as a second-half substitute. Cook played poorly in the 3–0 defeat and was jeered by the Watford crowd. He was ruled out for six weeks in August 2005 after tearing his lateral knee ligament against Hull City.

Cook played a significant role in QPR's battle to avoid relegation in the 2006–07 season, and he formed a great partnership with striker Dexter Blackstock.

QPR rejected a bid from Fulham for Cook in June 2007, but he eventually joined them for £2.5 million on 19 July 2007, signing a four-year contract. Cook gave his £250,000 signing-on fee to QPR as a parting gift to the club. He joined Charlton Athletic on loan until the end of the 2007–08 season in January 2008. He rejoined former club Queens Park Rangers on loan for the 2008–09 season in July 2008, with a view to a permanent move. Fulham manager Roy Hodgson confirmed on 5 December that Cook would sign a permanent contract with Queens Park Rangers for a fee of £850,000, which could rise to £1.2 million. He completed the move on 8 January 2009, signing a three-year contract, for an undisclosed fee.

On 19 March 2012, Cook rejoined Charlton Athletic on loan until the end of the season.

=== Leyton Orient ===
On 24 August 2012, Cook joined Football League One side Leyton Orient on a five-month contract, after his release from QPR. After 54 appearances and six goals in all competitions (including his loan spell), he rejected a contract extension at the end of the 2012–13 season. On 6 January 2014 he signed a six-month contract with Apollon Smyrnis in the Super League Greece. He played four times for the club, once in the league, before leaving at the end of the season after their relegation to the Football League.

=== Barnet ===
Cook signed for Barnet on a one-year deal on 5 August 2014. He scored twice on his debut in a 5–0 away win at Chester. He scored his first career hattrick in a 4–0 win over Dartford on 25 August, after coming on as a second-half substitute. He scored his sixth goal of the season in a 2–0 away victory against Southport a week later, with a chip from an extremely wide angle.

Cook scored six goals in his first six games for the Bees, but did not score at all after October and later lost his place in the team. He was released at the end of the season.

=== Eastleigh ===
On 29 June 2015, Cook signed for Conference National side Eastleigh. He was released at the end of the season after 36 league appearances.

== Honours ==
Barnet

- Conference Premier: 2014–15
