= Marc Nygaard =

Danish footballer (born 1976)

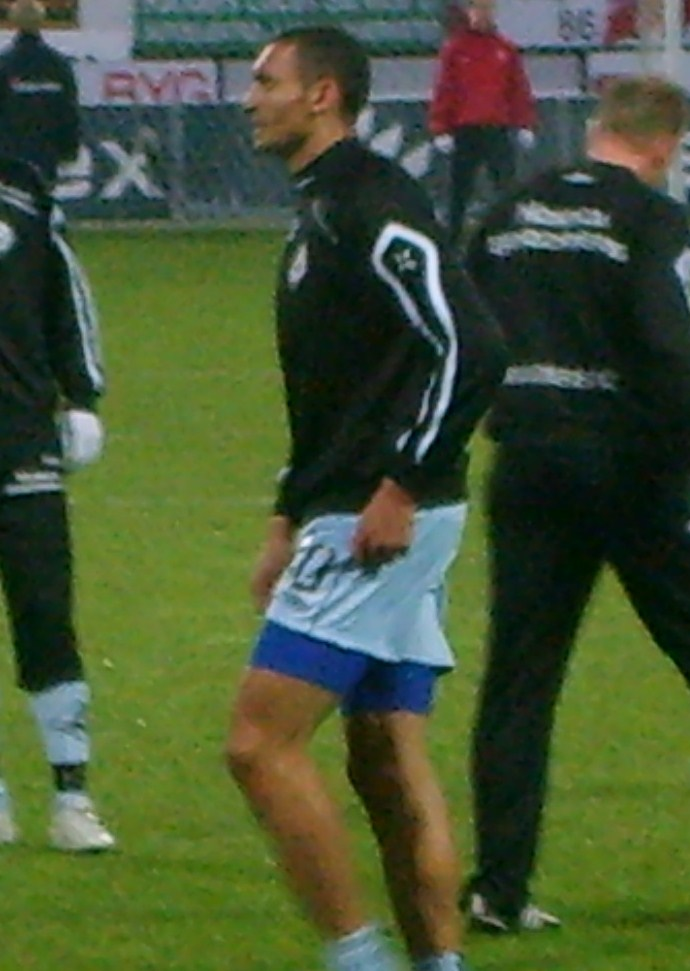
- Nygaard in 2008

Personal information
- Full name: Marc Stephen Griffith Nygaard
- Date of birth: 1 September 1976 (age 50)
- Place of birth: Copenhagen, Denmark
- Height: 1.96 m (6 ft 5 in)
- Position: Striker

Youth career
- Firkantens Boldklub
- B.93

Senior career*
Years	Team	Apps	(Gls)
1994–1995	Copenhagen	0	(0)
1995–1997	Heerenveen	26	(6)
1997–1998	MVV	34	(3)
1998–2002	Roda JC	86	(13)
2002–2003	Mouscron	8	(1)
2003–2005	Brescia	10	(0)
2004	→ Catania (loan)	12	(3)
2004	→ Vicenza (loan)	4	(0)
2005–2008	Queens Park Rangers	69	(13)
2008–2010	Randers	57	(22)
2010–2011	SpVgg Unterhaching	23	(3)
2011–2012	Helmond Sport	7	(0)
2013–2014	AB	6	(1)
Total		342	(65)

International career
2000–2008	Denmark	7	(0)
- * Club domestic league appearances and goals

Marc Stephen Griffith Nygaard (born 1 September 1976) is a Danish former professional footballer who played as a striker.

== Club career ==
Nygaard started his professional career in SC Heerenveen in 1995. He stayed with Heerenveen until 1997. He was then signed by MVV Maastricht. However, Nygaard only stayed with Maastricht one year before moving back to the Eredivisie in 1998 now playing for Roda JC. Nygaard stayed in Dutch football until 2003.

He was then signed by the Italian Serie A side Brescia Calcio.

=== Queens Park Rangers ===
Nygaard joined Rangers from the Italian side Brescia on free transfer in July 2005.

Nygaard made 72 appearances in all competitions during his two-and-a-half-year spell in W12, scoring 14 goals.

=== Randers FC ===
Nygaard made his first appearance for Randers in the quarter finals, of the Danish Cup, against Brøndby IF. However, due to an injury Nygaard found himself sidelined. Nygaard returned to the squad soon after and was in the starting line against AGF. Nygaard scored his first goal in this match. He scored two goals and the game ended 4–1.

Nygaard continued what was by his standards the best form of his career, scoring two goals in the same match. This time it was on 4 May against Esbjerg fB. However Randers FC failed to win the match and the game ended 3–2 to Esbjerg. Nygaard scored again on 7 May against FC Midtjylland. He scored from 25 yards with a well placed kick at the right side of the goal. Nygaard had now scored in three successive matches. RFC however failed to maintain the lead and lost the match 2–1.

Nygaard ended his first campaign with Randers FC in great style. Randers met Brøndby IF in their final game of the season. After numerous chances, Nygaard succeeded in getting a penalty for his site. Nygaard himself took the penalty and scored the first goal. Nygaard's teammate Søren Berg scored the final goal and Randers won the game 2–1. Nygaard ended his first campaign at Randers with nine league appearances and six goals.

Following the new campaign Nygaard found himself side lined in the first match against AGF due to yellow cards from the previous season. However Nygaard returned in the next match against FC Copenhagen. He scored his first goal in the 2008–09 season against FC Nordsjælland in the final minutes. The game ended 1–1. Nygaard scored the equalizer against Esbjerg on penalty the game ended 1–1. After the goal Nygaard was forced to leave the field due to an injury in his leg. However the injury was not as serious as feared. Following Nygaard success at club level he was on 31 October called in for the national team. After Randers skipper Ralf Pedersen had left the club to join Viborg FF Nygaard was selected as the new team captain.

Although he failed to impress in the second tier of English football, Nygaard had great personal success following the first half of the 2008–09 season. He managed to score in seven successive matches thereby becoming top scorer along with OB striker Djiby Fall.

Nygaard finished the season with a record of 26 matches played and 16 goals scored. Nygaard won the topscorer-prize beating his nearest rivals with one goal.

His contract with Randers expired on 1 July 2010, and he became a free agent. In August 2010 he signed with German 3. Liga club SpVgg Unterhaching.

== Personal life ==
Nygaard was born in Denmark to a Guyanese father and Danish mother.

Sporting positions
Preceded by Ralf Pedersen	Randers FC captain 2008–2010	Succeeded by Søren Pedersen
