= Marcus Bignot =

English football player and manager (born 1974)

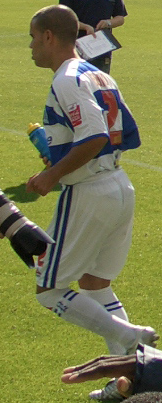
- Bignot playing for Queens Park Rangers in 2005

Personal information
- Full name: Marcus Bignot
- Date of birth: 22 August 1974 (age 52)
- Place of birth: Birmingham, England
- Height: 5 ft 9 in (1.75 m)
- Position: Right back

Team information
- Current team: Swindon Town (assistant head coach)

Youth career
- Birmingham City

Senior career*
Years	Team	Apps	(Gls)
1992–1996	Telford United	149	(14)
1996–1997	Kidderminster Harriers	43	(1)
1997–2000	Crewe Alexandra	95	(0)
2000–2001	Bristol Rovers	26	(1)
2001–2002	Queens Park Rangers	44	(1)
2002–2004	Rushden & Diamonds	68	(2)
2004–2007	Queens Park Rangers	128	(0)
2007–2008	→ Millwall (loan)	8	(0)
2008–2009	Millwall	15	(0)
2009–2010	Oldham Athletic	0	(0)
2010	Kidderminster Harriers	5	(0)
2010–2011	Brackley Town	2	(0)
2012–2016	Solihull Moors	2	(0)
Total		585	(19)

International career
1997	England C	1	(0)

Managerial career
- 1998–2005: Birmingham City Ladies
- 2011–2016: Solihull Moors
- 2016–2017: Grimsby Town
- 2017: Barrow (interim assistant)
- 2017–2018: Chester
- 2018–2022: Guiseley (joint manager)
- 2021: Aston Villa Women (interim)
- 2023–2024: Shrewsbury Town (assistant)
- 2024–2026: Swindon Town (assistant)
- * Club domestic league appearances and goals

Marcus Bignot (born 22 August 1974) is an English football manager and former professional player. He was most recently assistant head coach of Swindon Town.

Bignot's playing career spanned nearly 20 years, primarily as a right back, but he has also been used in a midfield role. He began his career at Telford United in 1992 where he spent four years in the Football Conference there. He then joined Kidderminster Harriers, he was part of the team that won the Conference League Cup, also in the 1996–97 season the Harriers came runners-up in the Football Conference. First Division side Crewe Alexandra paid £100K for him in the summer of 1997, he went on to be the player of the year in the 1997–98 season. Contractual disputes ended with a switch to Second Division side Bristol Rovers taking him on a free transfer for the 2000–2001 season. Management change made way for a move to First Division side Queens Park Rangers in March 2001 under his previous manager. A successful two-year spell at Rushden & Diamonds where he helped them gain promotion to the Second Division in the 2002–03 season as Champions. A move back to QPR in March 2004 where he helped them gain promotion to the Championship. Further spells at Millwall, Oldham Athletic before ending his playing career in 2012 at Solihull Moors.

A former England semi-pro international, he was capped in May 1997 for the England C national football team against the Scottish Highland Football League at Cove Rangers FC, near Aberdeen, where the England C Team won 5–0, with Lee Hughes, a teammate of Bignot's with Kidderminster at that time, and Barry Hayles of Stevenage, both to go on to play in the Premier League, in the England C team that Saturday afternoon in the North of Scotland.

Bignot enjoyed a successful seven-year management career, when he took over at Birmingham City Ladies from 1998, winning the Midland Combination League, AXA Northern Premier League and Runners-up of the FA Women's Premier League Cup. Bignot having managed Solihull Moors for five years, he got them promoted as champions of the National League North and the Birmingham Senior Cup champions in 2016, for the first time in their entire history.

In June 2024 he became assistant manager at Swindon Town.

== Playing career ==
Bignot was born in Birmingham and served his apprenticeship with Birmingham City. Having been released in 1992 by the club, he joined Telford United in the Football Conference league. After three seasons, a switch to fellow Football Conference side Kidderminster Harriers for a small fee was made in 1996. While with Kidderminster, the team finished the 1996–97 season as Runners-up in second place narrowly missing out on promotion by five points. The team that year won the Conference League Cup, beating Macclesfield Town in the final. Bignot made 56 appearances for the club in total.

He was capped once for the England C squad in May 1997 against the Scottish Highland Football League at Cove Rangers FC's former ground, Allan Park, near Aberdeen.

=== Crewe Alexandra ===
His performances didn't go unnoticed, Bignot moved on to newly promoted First Division side Crewe Alexandra in August 1997 for £100,000 – a record fee for Kidderminster Harriers at the time. At Gresty Road he was the supporters' player of the season 1997–98. After falling into dispute in June 2000 with the club over his contract, Bignot was free to leave under the Bosman ruling.

=== Bristol Rovers ===
Bignot signed a two-year deal at Bristol Rovers in the Second Division on a free transfer in August 2000. At Bristol Rovers he played a key part in his team beating Premier League side Everton in the League Cup. It was Bignot's equaliser in the second leg that took the match to penalties, which Rovers subsequently won. He had scored his first goal for the club in the previous round against Plymouth Argyle. Bignot also scored a memorable goal in the league against rivals Bristol City after just 28 seconds, but he could not prevent his team losing 3–2.

=== Queens Park Rangers ===
A change of management prompted a move to First Division side Queens Park Rangers in March 2001 to rejoin his old manager, Ian Holloway. Bignot scored his first goal for QPR in the 2–1 away defeat to Burnley, Peter Crouch chipping the ball into the box sub Andy Thomson to head down into the path of Bignot who shot home from close range after skillfully controlling the ball. Bignot turned down a new contract at QPR at the end of the 2001–02 season, Holloway stating this was due to QPR working on a reduced wage structure and only offering him 50 per cent of what he earned that year.

=== Rushden & Diamonds ===
Bignot signed for Rushden & Diamonds in the Third Division on a short-term deal at the start of 2002–03 season, however, having played on the opening day of the season at Swansea City, three days later he sustained a medial knee ligaments only 11 minutes into his home debut against Torquay United. He returned to training in the second week in September and extended his stay at Nene Park for another month. He extended his stay by agreeing a new month's contract in November having taken over the right-back slot for the past couple of games. He turned down a move to an unnamed Second Division side and signed an 18-month contract with Rushden & Diamonds. Bignot played a key role to keep Diamonds in the third division's automatic promotion places, completing the last 16 games since October and earned the official Diamonds player of the month award for his impressive form in December 2002. In April 2003, his side beat Carlisle 1–2 at Brunton Park, having set up one of the goals to seal promotion. A month later his team were crowned champions of the Third Division in the 2002–03 season.

=== Return to Queens Park Rangers ===
Due to a consequence of the financial meltdown at Rushden & Diamonds, Bignot was sold back to QPR in March 2004. QPR finished the 2003–04 season in second place, Bignot being part of the team that clinched promotion to the Championship. He captained a cash-strapped QPR to Championship survival in his final season. Bignot was released in January 2008 after his contract had expired.

=== Millwall ===
Having joined Millwall on loan in November 2007. Bignot extended his stay at Millwall for a further two months following an injury crisis at the club. On 15 January 2008, Bignot was released by QPR, however, he rejoined Millwall on a permanent basis just a few hours later an 18-month contract. He was drafted in by Millwall to help them avoid the drop into League Two. Having successfully helped the club avoid relegation, his playing time was limited at the start of the 2008–09 season due to a knee injury. He was part of the squad that eventually lost 3–2 in the 2009 Football League One play-off final against Scunthorpe.

On 1 February 2010, he had his contract cancelled by mutual consent, and rejoined Conference side Kidderminster Harriers on a non contract basis until the end of the season on 17 February 2010. He was released in May 2010, Bignot had a trial at Conference North club Gainsborough Trinity in July 2010. Later that month, he joined Southern League Premier side Brackley Town on 30 July 2010. His time at Brackley was limited to just five games, having mainly been on the subs bench.

== International career ==
Whilst at Kidderminster Harriers, Bignot played once for the England semi-pro (now England C) Team in May 1997, against the Scottish Highland Football League at Cove Rangers, the Highland Football League Team whose Allan Park ground is six miles south of Aberdeen, his side won 5–0 that Saturday afternoon, with strikers Barry Hayles, Lee Hughes, and goalkeeper Billy Stewart in the England team, all three players who subsequently went on to play at high levels in the English Football League.

== Managerial and coaching career ==
=== Birmingham City Ladies ===
Bignot at the age of 24 became manager of Birmingham City Ladies in 1998, and immediately revamped the entire youth structure at the club. He continued his own playing career in the Football League while managing the side in the newly created Midland Combination League and in their first season won the league, gaining automatic promotion into the FA Women's Premier League Northern Division in 2002. Also in 2001–02 Bignots team upset Doncaster Belles 4–3 in the FA Women's Premier League Cup semi-final. Having reached the final at Adams Park, Wycombe, Birmingham were thrashed 7–1 by full-time professional Fulham Ladies. After two seasons, Bignot clinched promotion to the top flight of women's football, joining the FA Women's Premier League National Division. He left his post with Birmingham in the 2005 close season after the club ran into financial difficulties.

For the 2011 FA WSL season Bignot returned to Birmingham Ladies as a Football Consultant.

=== Solihull Moors ===
Bignot initially joined Conference North club Solihull Moors as assistant manager towards the end of the 2010–11 season. On 27 June 2011, following the resignation of Micky Moore for the 2011–12 season, Bignot was appointed manager.

Bignot's team won an impressive 60% of their games during the 2015–16 season. This clinched the National League North title and secured promotion in that season with three games still left to play. It was the very first time Solihull Moors had reached National League level. In May 2016, Bignot reached the final and won the Birmingham Senior Cup with Solihull Moors also for the first time in their history, they beat Birmingham City 2–1 at St Andrew's stadium.

Bignot made his National League managerial debut with the club on 6 August 2016, Solihull Moors beating last seasons National League South champions Sutton United 3–1 at their Gander Green Lane stadium in the opening game of the 2016–17 season. Solihull Moors season started reasonably well with his team winning three of their first five games. On 5 November 2015, in the FA Cup first round, Bignots side came up against League Two opposition in the form of Yeovil Town away, they beat the odds and drew 2–2 having been two goals down to earn a replay.

During his time at Solihull Moors, the setup consisted of just a first team and an under-18 team; within 5 years, his additional role as director of football enhanced the structure of the club, creating 30-odd youth and junior teams, reserves, an academy and a disability section, as well as three girls teams and a ladies team, forming a community interest club within the surrounding areas of Solihull.

=== Grimsby Town ===
On 2 November 2016 Solihull Moors issued a statement that the board of League Two club Grimsby Town had made an official legal approach to them, and that they had granted permission for Bignot to speak to Grimsby about their vacant managerial position. On 7 November 2016, he was officially announced as the new Grimsby Town manager, along with the appointment of Micky Moore as his assistant.

Bignot made his full Grimsby Town managerial debut on 9 November 2016, in the EFL Trophy, losing 4–2 at home to Sheffield United. Bignot made his league managerial debut with Grimsby Town on 12 November 2016 at home against Barnet, drawing 2–2. Bignot's first league win came the next week, when Grimsby played first-place Plymouth Argyle, winning 3–0. The performance led to Bignot winning the English Football League team manager of the week.

On 10 April 2017, Bignot was dismissed by Grimsby, along with Michael Moore and Gary Whild.

=== Barrow (interim assistant manager) ===
On 5 September 2017, Bignot was appointed interim assistant manager of National League side Barrow to assist caretaker manager Micky Moore, following the resignation of manager Paul Cox.

=== Chester ===
On 20 September 2017, Bignot was appointed as manager of National League club Chester. At the end of March 2018, the board confirmed that his contract would not be renewed for the following season. Once relegation was confirmed, they "[saw] little value in him remaining in the position", and he left the club on 11 April 2018.

=== Guiseley ===
Bignot and former Alfreton Town manager Russ O'Neil were appointed joint managers of Guiseley in May 2018 following the team's relegation from the National League to the National League North. He left the club in April 2022.

=== England U18s ===
On 2 September 2019, Bignot was named as a coach for the England U18s as part of the Football Association's 2019–20 Elite Coach Placement Programme.

=== Aston Villa Women ===
On 25 January 2021 it was confirmed that Bignot would take over as an interim coach at Aston Villa Women. He departed the club on 10 May 2021 having steered Villa to safety.

=== England U19s ===
On 26 August 2021, Bignot was confirmed as the assistant coach of England U19s alongside Ian Foster.

=== Birmingham City Women ===
On 21 November 2021, Bignot returned to Birmingham City Women to assist interim head coach Darren Carter.

In July 2022, Bignot was sacked by Birmingham after he was found guilty of homophobic abuse. Bignot denied the charges from The FA but his defence was seen as "not credible" and it was decided that "on the balance of probabilities" Bignot had made the comment during their game against Tottenham Hotspur Women on 13 February 2022. He was also given a seven-match touchline ban, as well as being ordered to attend a face-to-face education course.

=== Cheltenham Town ===
On 26 July 2022, Bignot was appointed first-team coach of League One club Cheltenham Town. The club said that they had given very careful consideration to the appointment having held discussions with a number of different club stakeholders including representatives of the Proud Robins LGBTQ+ supporters network.

=== Shrewsbury Town ===
In July 2023, Bignot was appointed assistant head coach of Shrewsbury Town.

=== Swindon Town ===
In June 2024, Bignot was appointed assistant head coach of League Two side Swindon Town. In May 2026, he left the club by mutual consent.

== Personal life ==
Bignot has been a fan of Birmingham City football club since boyhood, having been brought up supporting them. Bignot's younger brother Paul Bignot was also a professional footballer.

In June 2013 Bignot married Arsenal Ladies and Ireland goalkeeper Emma Byrne. They have since divorced.

== Managerial statistics ==
As of match played 9 April 2022

Managerial record by team and tenure
Team	From	To	Record					Ref
Team	From	To	P	W	D	L	Win %	Ref
Solihull Moors	28 June 2011	7 November 2016	249	100	60	89	40.2	
Grimsby Town	7 November 2016	10 April 2017	27	9	7	11	33.3	
Chester	20 September 2017	11 April 2018	35	6	9	20	17.1	
Guiseley	15 May 2018	12 April 2022	149	45	39	65	30.2	
Aston Villa Women (Interim)	25 January 2021	10 May 2021	13	1	5	7	7.7	
Total			473	161	120	192	34.0	—

== Honours ==
=== Player ===
Kidderminster Harriers

- Conference League Cup: 1996–97

Rushden & Diamonds

- Football League Third Division: 2002–03

Queens Park Rangers

- Football League Second Division second-place promotion: 2003–04

Individual

- Crewe Alexandra Player of the Year: 1997–98
- Birmingham County FA Coach of the Year: 1998–99

=== Manager ===
Birmingham City Ladies

- Midland Combination League: 1998–99
- AXA Northern Premier League: 2001–02
- FA Women's Premier League Cup runner-up: 2001–02

Solihull Moors

- National League North: 2015–16
- Birmingham Senior Cup: 2015–16

Individual

- National League North Manager of the Month: October 2014, August 2015
