= Stefan Bailey =

English footballer (born 1987)

Personal information
- Full name: Stefan Kyon Lloyd Bailey
- Date of birth: 10 October 1987 (age 39)
- Place of birth: Brent, London, England
- Position: Midfielder

Team information
- Current team: Kempston Rovers

Senior career*
| Years | Team | Apps | (Gls) |
| 2005–2008 | Queens Park Rangers | 18 | (0) |
| 2007 | → Oxford United (loan) | 3 | (0) |
| 2008–2009 | Grays Athletic | 14 | (0) |
| 2009 | → Farnborough (loan) | ? | (?) |
| 2009–2010 | Ebbsfleet United | 33 | (4) |
| 2010–2011 | AFC Telford United | 5 | (0) |
| 2011 | Kettering Town | 0 | (0) |
| 2011 | Banbury United | 5 | (1) |
| 2011–2012 | Arlesey Town | 23 | (0) |
| 2012–2013 | Havant & Waterlooville | 14 | (0) |
| 2013–2014 | Wealdstone | 26 | (4) |
| 2013 | → Banbury United (loan) | 1 | (0) |
| 2013 | → Dunstable Town (loan) | 5 | (2) |
| 2013 | → Dunstable Town (loan) | 2 | (0) |
| 2014–2016 | Arlesey Town | 25 | (2) |
| 2016 | AFC Dunstable | | |
| 2016–2018 | Bovingdon | | |
| 2018–2019 | Barton Rovers | | |
| 2019– | Kempston Rovers | | |

International career^{‡}
| 2008 | England C | 1 | (0) |
- * Club domestic league appearances and goals as of 11:54, 23 March 2020 (UTC) ‡ National team caps and goals as of 11:54, 23 March 2020 (UTC)

Stefan Kyon Lloyd Bailey (born 10 October 1987, in Brent, London) is an English semi-professional footballer who plays for Kempston Rovers.

== Career ==
Bailey made his professional debut towards the end of the 2004–05 season at the age of 17, coming off the bench for Queens Park Rangers (QPR) in a Championship match away to Sheffield United. His premature call up was due to a lengthy injury list to Ian Holloway's side, but Bailey impressed with some strong tackles, good turns and an array of impressive passes.

The following two seasons saw Bailey feature more regularly, but he failed to hold down a regular first team place, despite some promising displays.

On 12 October 2007, he was signed by Oxford United on a one-month loan, where he made three appearances in the Conference Premier.

Following his release from QPR, Bailey signed a one-year contract for Grays Athletic on 19 June 2008. He was transfer listed by the club in January 2009, with financial pressures and manager Wayne Burnett's plans being cited as the reason. Bailey was sent out on loan to Farnborough in March 2009.

Ebbsfleet United signed Bailey in August following a successful trial. He made his debut against Stevenage Borough on 18 August in Ebbsfleet's 3–0 away loss in the Conference Premier. Bailey was released by Ebbsfleet in the summer of 2010 and went on to sign an initial short-term contract with Conference North club AFC Telford United.

Bailey has since had spells with Kettering Town, two spells with Banbury United as well as a stint with Havant & Waterlooville. He then went on to sign for Isthmian Football League side Wealdstone and also had two spells with Dunstable Town.

After a spell at Wealdstone, Bailey re-signed for his second spell at Southern Football League Premier Division side Arlesey Town for the 2014–15 season, the side managed by Rufus Brevett.

Bailey went on to play for AFC Dunstable, Bovingdon, Barton Rovers and Kempston Rovers.
