= Shabazz Baidoo =

British footballer (born 1988)

Personal information
- Full name: Shabazz Kwame Kussie Baidoo
- Date of birth: 13 April 1988 (age 38)
- Place of birth: Hackney, England
- Height: 1.73 m (5 ft 8 in)
- Position: Striker

Youth career
- Tottenham Hotspur
- Arsenal

Senior career*
Years	Team	Apps	(Gls)
2005–2008	Queens Park Rangers	28	(3)
2007	→ Gillingham (loan)	0	(0)
2008	Dagenham & Redbridge	3	(0)
2008	Lewes	5	(0)
2008–2010	Croydon Athletic		
2010	Bishop's Stortford	0	(0)
2010–2012	Croydon Athletic		
2012	Wealdstone	7	(1)
2013–2014	Biggleswade Town	1	(0)

International career
2003	England U16	1	(0)
- * Club domestic league appearances and goals as of 15:12, 5 August 2015 (UTC)

Shabazz Kwame Kussie Baidoo (born 13 April 1988) is an English former professional footballer.

== Football career ==
Born in Hackney, as a youngster Baidoo played at first for Tottenham Hotspur's youth team and then with Arsenal's youth team. He later left Arsenal and had a trial at Norwich City before signing up for Queens Park Rangers.

Baidoo burst onto the scenes rather prematurely, during an injury crisis for Ian Holloway's team towards the end of the 2004–05 season. He made his club debut aged just 16. The following two seasons saw Baidoo feature slightly more regularly, scoring four goals and making numerous substitute appearances and a few starts. However, with John Gregory becoming manager, Baidoo had been used sparingly and out of position, on the wing. Baidoo went on loan to Gillingham in December 2007, but failed to make an appearance for the club, returning to Loftus Road in the New Year. Altogether Baidoo made 33 appearances and scored four goals for QPR.

On 17 January 2008, Baidoo's contract was terminated by mutual consent by QPR. On the same day he joined Dagenham & Redbridge on a deal that lasted until the end of the 2007–08 season. In September 2008, he joined Conference club Lewes on a monthly contract and was released from the club afterwards. In October 2008 he moved on to Croydon Athletic.

During the summer of 2013, Baidoo left Croydon to link up with Biggleswade Town. Around the same time, he had been working as a car trader.

== Musical career ==
As well as his career as a professional footballer, Baidoo has a music career under the stage name Terminator (otherwise known as T or the Darkside Pioneer). According to his GrimeForum page, Baidoo's musical career is secondary to his footballing and is a recreational activity. However, since the end of his football career, his output has been more sporadic and he prefers to be an unsigned artist.

Baidoo is said to have created his own musical subgenre within grime known as "darkside", which predominantly involves a "sluggish flow" coupled with violent lyrics. Some of his musical techniques include rhyming words with themselves and holding one syllable for an extended amount of time to allow a bar to pass. Sometimes Baidoo will even make use of one word lines in his lyrics.

On 19 December 2013, Baidoo released Darkside Pioneer. On 2 November 2015, Baidoo released Darkest Facts of Existence. In March 2019, Baidoo released a surprise project, his third album, Darkest Facts.

=== Discography ===
==== Albums ====
- Darkside Pioneer (2013)
- Darkest Facts of Existence (2015)
- Darkest Facts (2019)

==== EP ====
- Friday the 13th (2013)
