= Patrick Kanyuka =

Congolese footballer (born 1987)

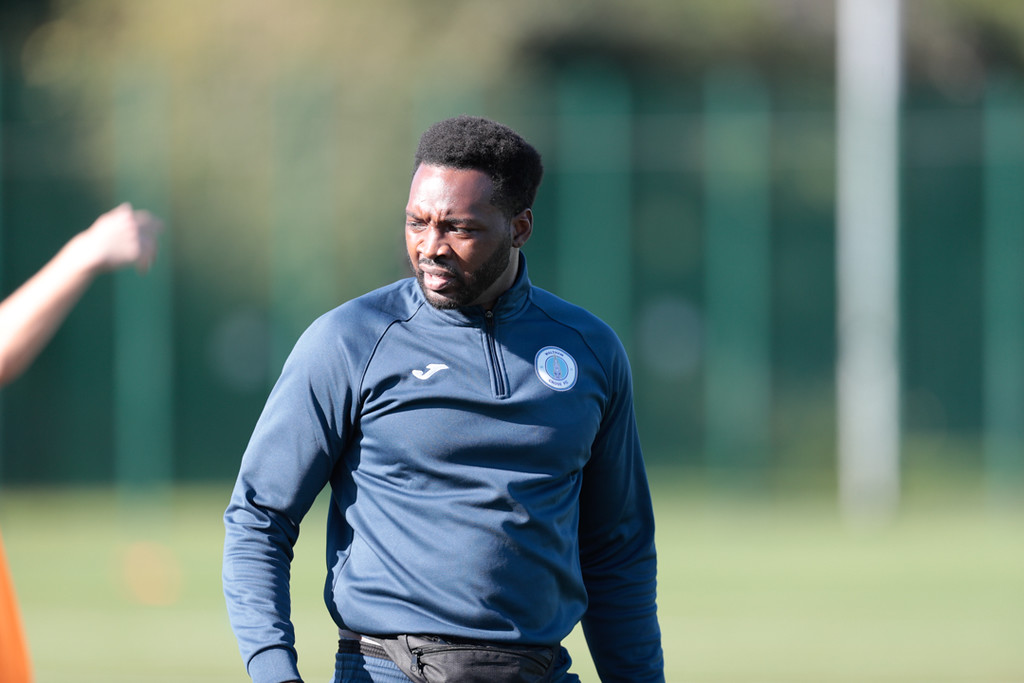
- Kanyuka in 2023 waltham cross fc

Personal information
- Full name: Patrick Elamenji Kanyuka
- Date of birth: 19 July 1987 (age 39)
- Place of birth: Kinshasa, Zaire
- Height: 6 ft 4 in (1.93 m)
- Position: Defender

Youth career
- 2004–2005: Leyton Orient

Senior career*
Years	Team	Apps	(Gls)
2005–2008	Queens Park Rangers	12	(0)
2008–2009	Swindon Town	20	(1)
2009–2010	Northampton Town	3	(0)
2010–2011	CFR Cluj	0	(0)
2010	→ Unirea Alba Iulia (loan)	3	(0)
2011	Lincoln City	6	(0)
2011–2012	Tamworth	13	(0)
2012	Staines Town	6	(0)
2012–2013	Maidenhead United	7	(0)
2013–2014	Roi Et United	21	(9)
2015	Limerick	10	(0)
2016–2019	Shan United	16	(2)

Managerial career
- 2021-2022: Enfield Borough F.C.
- 2022-2023: Waltham Cross F.C.
- * Club domestic league appearances and goals as of 15:19, 22 February 2018 (UTC)

Patrick Elamenji Kanyuka (born 19 July 1987) is a Congolese former footballer who played as a defender. He is the founder and chairman of Waltham Cross Football Club and the owner of multiple businesses, including Future Cross CIC, Patkans, and the International College Programme. Kanyuka is also involved in Active in Hope Community Foundation, which focuses on mental health, education, and skills development.

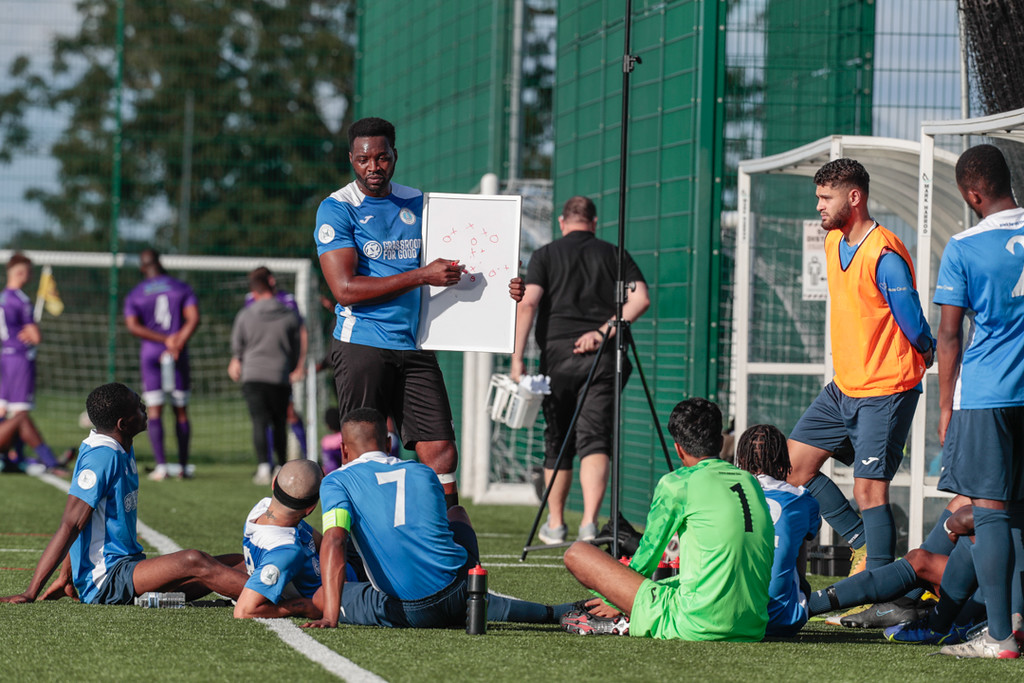
in 2023

== Early life ==
Kanyuka was born on 19 July 1987. Born in Kinshasa, Democratic Republic of the Congo, he grew up in Canning Town, England. Growing up, he attended Eastlea Community School in England.

== Career ==
=== Queens Park Rangers ===
Born in Kinshasa, Kanyuka started his career with Leyton Orient as a youth player in 2003 before joining Queens Park Rangers the following year. Source Neilson N. Kaufman - historian Leyton Orient FC . Queens Park Rangers after signing a professional contract on 19 July 2004. His early career was plagued by injuries, but towards the end of the 2005–06 season he held down a regular place in John Gregory's side due to an injury to Danny Cullip.

=== Swindon Town ===
He signed for Swindon Town on 21 January 2008 until the end of the season after being released by Queens Park Rangers. Kanyuka made his Swindon debut in the 1–0 win at Luton Town, he played the whole game despite being kicked in the forehead by former QPR teammate Paul Furlong, an injury that required many stitches and forced him to miss Swindon's next game. He was released at the end of the season, having scored once against Bristol Rovers in 20 league appearances.

=== Motherwell trial & Northampton Town ===
On 21 July 2009, Scottish Premier League club Motherwell handed the defender a trial, however he later signed for League Two team Northampton Town on an initial three-month deal during October 2009 after a successful trial.

=== CFR Cluj & FC Unirea Alba Iulia loan ===
In January 2010 after impressing during pre-season Kanyuka was signed by CFR Cluj. He joined Unirea Alba Iulia on loan in August.

=== Lincoln City ===
On 27 January 2011, he signed on a free transfer for League Two side Lincoln City. In May 2011, he was not offered a new contract after a mass clear out of players following the club's relegation from the Football League.

=== Tamworth ===
In August 2011 he signed for Tamworth. Kanyuka was released from the club on 27 January 2012, having made 18 league and cup appearances, including a third round FA Cup match against Premier League side Everton.

=== Trials ===
On 13 March 2012 Kanyuka scored in a behind closed doors game at Leeds United's training ground, Thorp Arch, whilst on trial. Kanyuka went stateside and joined C.D. Chivas USA on trial. He left them on 28 March 2012.

=== Staines Town ===
In October 2012 he joined Staines Town. He move on to join Maidenhead United in December 2012 but left the following month to move to Thailand and join Roi Et United.

=== Limerick FC ===
In July 2015, Kanyuka joined Irish Premier Division side Limerick FC. He cemented his place in the first team with some impressive performances. He left the club following their relegation in November 2015.

=== Shan United FC ===
In 2016 January, Kanyuka moved to Shan United.

=== Waltham Cross Football Club ===
In 2021, Kanyuka founded Waltham Cross Football Club, the first semi-professional football club in Waltham Cross.

=== Future Cross CIC ===
Kanyuka is the founder of Future Cross CIC, a sports tour company that organizes youth development tournaments.

=== Patkans ===
In addition to football management, Kanyuka launched Patkans, a sportswear brand supplying kits and apparel to football clubs.

== Style of play ==
Kanyuka played as a defender. He has played as a midfielder while playing for English side Swindon Town.

== Coaching career ==
In 2021, Kanyuka was named the assistant manager to Anthony McNamee at Combined Counties League Division One side Enfield Borough.

== Personal life ==
Kanyuka has a son.
