= 2010–11 Queens Park Rangers F.C. season =

English football club season

QPR
2010–11 season
- Manager: Neil Warnock
- Stadium: Loftus Road (18,360)
- Football League Championship: 1st (champions)
- FA Cup: Third round
- League Cup: First round
- Top goalscorer: League: Adel Taarabt (19); All: Adel Taarabt (19)
- Highest home attendance: 18,234 v Leeds United (7 May 2011)
- Lowest home attendance: 12,046 v Scunthorpe (21 August 2010)
- Average home league attendance: 15,635
- Biggest win: 4 – 0 Vs Barnsley (7 August 2010)
- Biggest defeat: 1–4 Vs Scunthorpe United (9 April 2011)
Home colours	Away colours	Third colours

The 2010–11 season was Queens Park Rangers's 122nd professional season and their seventh consecutive season in the Championship. The club finished the season in first place, winning promotion to the Premier League after a 15-year absence.

== Kit ==
Lotto Sport Italia continued as manufacturers of QPR's kit. Airline Gulf Air continued as kit sponsors.

== Players ==
As of the end of the season.

=== First team squad ===
No.	Name	Nationality	Position (s)	Since	Date of birth (age)	Signed from
Goalkeepers
1	Paddy Kenny	(Republic of Ireland) (Note: Kenny was born in Halifax, England, but also qualified to represent the Republic of Ireland internationally through his parents and made his international debut for the Republic of Ireland in June 2004.)	GK	2010	17 May 1978 (aged 32)	(England) Sheffield United
24	Radek Černý	(Czech Republic)	GK	2008	18 February 1974 (aged 37)	(Czech Republic) Slavia Prague
32	Elvijs Putninš	(Latvia)	GK	2009	12 June 1991 (aged 19)	(England) Queens Park Rangers Academy
Defenders
2	Bradley Orr	(England)	CB	2010	1 November 1982 (aged 28)	(England) Bristol City
3	Clint Hill	(England)	CB / LB	2010	19 October 1978 (aged 32)	(England) Crystal Palace
5	Fitz Hall	(England)	CB	2008	20 February 1980 (aged 31)	(England) Wigan Athletic
13	Kaspars Gorkšs	(Latvia)	CB	2008	6 November 1981 (aged 29)	(England) Blackpool
16	Matthew Connolly	(England)	CB	2008	24 September 1987 (aged 23)	(England) Arsenal
22	Peter Ramage	(England)	CB	2008	22 November 1983 (aged 27)	(England) Newcastle United
26	Gary Borrowdale	(England)	LB	2008	16 July 1985 (aged 25)	(England) Coventry City
39	Pascal Chimbonda	(France)	RB	2011	21 February 1979 (aged 32)	(England) Blackburn Rovers
40	Michael Harriman	(England)	RB	2011	23 October 1992 (aged 18)	(England) Queens Park Rangers Academy
41	Danny Shittu	(Nigeria)	CB	2011	2 September 1980 (aged 30)	(England) Millwall
Midfielders
4	Shaun Derry	(England)	DM	2010	6 December 1977 (aged 33)	(England) Crystal Palace
7	Adel Taarabt	(Morocco) (Note: Taarabt was born in Fez, Morocco, but was raised in France and represented them at U-17 and U-19 level before making his international debut for Morocco in February 2009.)	AM	2009	24 May 1989 (aged 21)	(England) Tottenham Hotspur
10	Ákos Buzsáky	(Hungary)	CM	2007	7 May 1982 (aged 29)	(England) Plymouth Argyle
11	Alejandro Faurlín	(Argentina)	CM	2009	9 August 1986 (aged 24)	(Argentina) Instituto Atlético
14	Martin Rowlands	(Republic of Ireland) (Note: Rowlands was born in Hammersmith and Fulham, England, but also qualified to represent the Republic of Ireland internationally and represented them at U-21 level before making his international debut for the Republic of Ireland in 2004.)	CM	2003	8 February 1979 (aged 32)	(England) Brentford
15	Wayne Routledge	(England)	LM	2011	7 January 1985 (aged 26)	On loan from (England) Newcastle United
17	Lee Cook	(England)	LM	2004	3 July 1982 (aged 28)	(England) Watford
23	Petter Vaagan Moen	(Norway)	AM	2011	5 February 1984 (aged 27)	(Norway) Brann
25	Hogan Ephraim	(England)	RM / LM	2007	31 March 1988 (aged 23)	(England) West Ham United
30	Romone Rose	(England)	AM	2008	19 January 1990 (aged 21)	(England) Queens Park Rangers Academy
35	Josh Parker	(Antigua and Barbuda) (Note: Parker was born in Slough, England, but also qualifies to represent Antigua and Barbuda internationally and made his international debut for Antigua and Barbuda in November 2010.)	RM	2009	1 December 1990 (aged 20)	(England) Queens Park Rangers Academy
36	Bruno Andrade	(Portugal)	AM	2010	2 October 1993 (aged 17)	(England) Queens Park Rangers Academy
37	Georgios Tofas	(Cyprus)	AM	2010	17 July 1989 (aged 21)	(Cyprus) Anorthosis
Forwards
9	Heiðar Helguson	(Iceland)	CF	2008	22 August 1977 (aged 33)	(England) Bolton Wanderers
12	Jamie Mackie	(Scotland) (Note: Mackie was born in Dorking, England, but also qualifies to represent Scotland internationally through his grandfather and made his international debut for Scotland in October 2010.)	ST / RW	2010	22 September 1985 (aged 25)	(England) Plymouth Argyle
19	Patrick Agyemang	(Ghana) (Note: Agyemang was born in Waltham Forest, England, but also qualified to represent Ghana internationally and made his international debut for Ghana in May 2003.)	CF	2008	29 September 1980 (aged 30)	(England) Preston North End
20	Rob Hulse	(England)	CF	2010	25 October 1979 (aged 31)	(England) Derby County
21	Tommy Smith	(England)	CF	2010	22 May 1980 (aged 30)	On loan from (England) Portsmouth
33	Antonio German	(England)	ST	2009	26 December 1991 (aged 19)	(England) Queens Park Rangers Academy
42	Troy Hewitt	(England)	CF	2011	10 February 1990 (aged 21)	(England) Harrow Borough

=== Out on loan ===
Note: Flags indicate national team as defined under FIFA eligibility rules; some limited exceptions apply. Players may hold more than one non-FIFA nationality.

No.	Pos.	Nation	Player
6	MF	ANT	Mikele Leigertwood (Note: Leigertwood was born in Enfield, England, but also qualified to represent Antigua and Barbuda internationally and made his international debut for Antigua and Barbuda in November 2008.) (on loan at Reading)
8	FW	ENG	Leon Clarke (on loan at Preston)
18	MF	ENG	Gavin Mahon (on loan at Crystal Palace)
27	DF	ENG	Lee Brown (on loan at Hayes & Yeading)
28	DF	ENG	Joe Oastler (on loan at Torquay)

No.	Pos.	Nation	Player
34	MF	GER	Max Ehmer (on loan at Yeovil)
38	MF	WAL	Michael Doughty (Note: Doughty was born in Westminster, England, but also qualifies to represent Wales internationally and has represented them at U-19 and U-21 level.) (on loan at Woking)
—	FW	COL	Ángelo Balanta (on loan at MK Dons)
—	MF	ITA	Matteo Alberti (on loan at Lumezzane)
—	FW	ITA	Alessandro Pellicori (on loan at Torino)

== Transfers ==
=== In ===
Date	No.	Pos.	Name	From	Fee	Source
20 May 2010	12	FW	(Scotland) Jamie Mackie	Plymouth Argyle	Undisclosed	
21 May 2010	8	FW	(England) Leon Clarke	Sheffield Wednesday	Free	
7 June 2010	1	GK	(Republic of Ireland) Paddy Kenny	Sheffield United	£750,000	
22 June 2010	4	MF	(England) Shaun Derry	Crystal Palace	Free	
1 July 2010	3	DF	(England) Clint Hill	Crystal Palace	Free	
30 July 2010	2	DF	(England) Bradley Orr	Bristol City	Undisclosed	
5 August 2010	7	MF	(Morocco) Adel Taarabt	Tottenham Hotspur	Undisclosed	
31 August 2010	20	FW	(England) Rob Hulse	Derby County	Undisclosed	
18 October 2010	18	MF	(England) Gavin Mahon	Unattached	Free	
1 November 2010	37	MF	(Cyprus) Giorgos Tofas	(Cyprus) Anorthosis	Free	
1 January 2011	23	MF	(Norway) Petter Vaagan Moen	(Norway) Brann	Free	
3 January 2011	21	FW	(England) Tommy Smith	Portsmouth	Undisclosed	
21 January 2011	39	DF	(France) Pascal Chimbonda	Blackburn Rovers	Free	
27 January 2011	41	DF	(Nigeria) Danny Shittu	Millwall	Free	
14 March 2011	42	FW	(England) Troy Hewitt	Harrow Borough	Undisclosed	

=== Out ===
Date	No.	Pos.	Name	To	Fee	Source
1 July 2010	4	MF	(England) Gavin Mahon	Unattached	Released	
1 July 2010	15	MF	(Scotland) Nigel Quashie (Note: Quashie was born in Southwark, England, and represented them at U-21 and B level, but also qualified to represent Ghana internationally through his father and Scotland through his grandfather and made his international debut for Scotland in May 2004.)	Unattached	Released	
30 July 2010	3	DF	(Jamaica) Damion Stewart	Bristol City	Undisclosed	

=== Loans in ===
Start	No.	Pos.	Name	From	Expiry	Source(s)
9 September 2010	21	FW	(England) Tommy Smith	Portsmouth	End of 2010	
13 September 2010	15	DF	(England) Kyle Walker	Tottenham Hotspur	3 January 2011	
21 January 2011	15	MF	(England) Wayne Routledge	Newcastle United	End of season	
22 January 2011	29	MF	(England) Ishmael Miller	West Bromwich Albion	24 April 2011	

=== Loans out ===
Start	No.	Pos.	Name	To	Expiry	Source(s)
8 June 2010	–	FW	(Colombia) Ángelo Balanta	MK Dons	End of season	
22 July 2010	21	MF	(Italy) Matteo Alberti	(Italy) Lumezzane	End of season	
27 August 2010	12	FW	(Italy) Alessandro Pellicori	(Italy) Torino	End of season	
September 2010	27	DF	(England) Lee Brown	Hayes & Yeading	End of season	
1 October 2010	8	FW	(England) Rowan Vine	Hull City	6 November 2010	
1 October 2010	35	MF	(Antigua and Barbuda) Josh Parker	Northampton Town	30 October 2010	
8 October 2010	28	DF	(England) Joe Oastler	Torquay United	End of season	
22 October 2010	30	MF	(England) Romone Rose	Torquay United	31 December 2010	
5 November 2010	33	FW	(England) Antonio German	Southend United	15 December 2010	
22 November 2010	6	MF	(Antigua and Barbuda) Mikele Leigertwood	Reading	End of season	
23 November 2010	35	MF	(Antigua and Barbuda) Josh Parker	Wycombe Wanderers	26 February 2011	
25 November 2010	8	FW	(England) Rowan Vine	Brentford	4 January 2011	
1 January 2011	–	MF	(Germany) Max Ehmer	Yeovil Town	End of season	
14 January 2011	32	GK	(Latvia) Elvijs Putninš	Boreham Wood	February 2011	
15 January 2011	8	FW	(England) Rowan Vine	MK Dons	22 April 2011	
28 January 2011	8	FW	(England) Leon Clarke	Preston North End	End of season	
8 February 2011	26	DF	(England) Gary Borrowdale	Carlisle United	March 2011	
10 February 2011	33	FW	(England) Antonio German	Yeovil Town	24 March 2011	
25 February 2011	14	MF	(Republic of Ireland) Martin Rowlands	Millwall	22 March 2011	
24 March 2011	18	MF	(England) Gavin Mahon	Crystal Palace	End of Season	
31 March 2011	38	MF	(Wales) Michael Doughty	Woking	April 2011	

== Championship statistics ==
=== Championship table ===
Pos	Team	Pld	W	D	L	GF	GA	GD	Pts	Promotion, qualification or relegation
1	Queens Park Rangers (C, P)	46	24	16	6	71	32	+39	88	Promotion to the Premier League
2	Norwich City (P)	46	23	15	8	83	58	+25	84	Promotion to the Premier League
3	Swansea City (O, P)	46	24	8	14	69	42	+27	80	Qualification for Championship play-offs
4	Cardiff City	46	23	11	12	76	54	+22	80	Qualification for Championship play-offs
5	Reading	46	20	17	9	77	51	+26	77	Qualification for Championship play-offs

Updated to match(es) played on 7 May 2011. Source: The Football League
Rules for classification: 1) points; 2) goal difference; 3) number of goals scored.
(C) Champions; (O) Play-off winners; (P) Promoted

=== League performance ===
Round	1	2	3	4	5	6	7	8	9	10	11	12	13	14	15	16	17	18	19	20	21	22	23	24	25	26	27	28	29	30	31	32	33	34	35	36	37	38	39	40	41	42	43	44	45	46
Ground	H	A	H	A	H	A	A	H	H	A	H	A	A	H	H	A	A	H	H	H	A	H	A	A	H	A	H	A	H	A	H	A	H	A	H	A	H	A	H	A	A	H	A	H	A	H
Result	W	W	W	D	W	W	W	W	D	W	D	D	D	D	W	D	D	W	W	L	L	W	W	L	D	D	W	D	W	W	D	D	W	W	W	L	W	W	W	L	W	D	D	D	W	L
Position	1	1	1	1	1	1	1	1	1	1	1	1	1	2	1	1	2	1	1	1	1	1	1	1	1	1	1	1	1	1	1	1	1	1	1	1	1	1	1	1	1	1	1	1	1	1

Updated to match(es) played on 7 May 2011. Source: QPR.CO.UK
A = Away; H = Home; W = Win; D = Draw; L = Loss

== Fixtures & results ==
=== Pre-season ===
12 July 2010	Tavistock	0–8	Queens Park Rangers	Devon
19:00 BST		(Report)	Buzsáky 1', 10'; Hill 18'; Mackie 31'; Ephraim 53', 87'; Parker 58'; Faurlín 71'	Stadium: Langsford Park

14 July 2010	Bodmin Town	0–6	Queens Park Rangers	Cornwall
19:30 BST		(Report)	Ephraim 4', 88'; Mackie 12'; Morgan 63' (o.g.); German 84'; Parker 85'	Stadium: Priory Park

16 July 2010	Torquay United	1–3	Queens Park Rangers	Devon
19:30 BST	Robertson 62'	(Report)	Helguson 9'; Parker 73'; Ephraim 89'	Stadium: Plainmoor; Attendance: 1,429

21 July 2010	Equipe Romagna (Italy)	1–4	Queens Park Rangers	Ravenna
20:00 BST	Agostinelli 87'	(Report)	Ephraim 44'; Clarke 57', 74'; Parker 66'	Stadium: Stadio dei Pini

25 July 2010	Ravenna Calcio (Italy)	1–2	Queens Park Rangers	Ravenna
20:00 BST	Piovaccari 17'	(Report)	Ephraim 44'; Mackie 48'	Stadium: Stadio Bruno Benelli

28 July 2010	Crawley Town	2–0	Queens Park Rangers XI	West Sussex
19:45 BST	Tubbs 15', 66'	(Report)		Stadium: Broadfield Stadium; Attendance: 1,110

30 July 2010	Queens Park Rangers	1–1	Plymouth Argyle	London
19:30 BST	Mackie 82'	(Report)	Summerfield 11' (pen.)	Stadium: Loftus Road; Attendance: 2,844; Referee: P. Russell

=== npower Championship ===
7 August 2010 1	Queens Park Rangers	4–0	Barnsley	London
15:00 BST	Helguson 41' (pen.); Mackie 53'; Taarabt 63' (pen.); Hall 81'	(Report)		Stadium: Loftus Road; Attendance: 13,445; Referee: J. Linington

14 August 2010 2	Sheffield United	0–3	Queens Park Rangers	Sheffield
15:00 BST		(Report)	Ephraim 11'; Mackie 20'; Taarabt 23' (pen.)	Stadium: Bramall Lane; Attendance: 22,651; Referee: A. Woolmer

21 August 2010 3	Queens Park Rangers	2–0	Scunthorpe United	London
15:00 BST	Orr 17'; Helguson 41'	(Report)		Stadium: Loftus Road; Attendance: 12,046; Referee: G. Salisbury

28 August 2010 4	Derby County	2–2	Queens Park Rangers	Derby
15:00 BST	Commons 40'; Bailey 59'	(Report)	Agyemang 90+2'; Mackie 90+5'	Stadium: Pride Park; Attendance: 25,874; Referee: M. Haywood

11 September 2010 5	Queens Park Rangers	3–0	Middlesbrough	London
15:00 BST	Helguson 49' (pen.); Ephraim 53'; Mackie 59'	(Report)		Stadium: Loftus Road; Attendance: 14,784; Referee: M.P. Russell

14 September 2010 6	Ipswich Town	0–3	Queens Park Rangers	Ipswich
19:45 BST		(Report)	Mackie 30', 42'; Helguson 68' (pen.)	Stadium: Portman Road; Attendance: 19,931; Referee: K. Stroud

18 September 2010 7	Leicester City	0–2	Queens Park Rangers	Leicester
15:00 BST		(Report)	Mackie 12', 86'	Stadium: Walkers Stadium; Attendance: 22,968; Referee: G. Scott

25 September 2010 8	Queens Park Rangers	3–0	Doncaster Rovers	London
15:00 BST	Gorkšs 53', 88'; Taarabt 81' (pen.)	(Report)		Stadium: Loftus Road; Attendance: 13,990; Referee: R. East

28 September 2010 9	Queens Park Rangers	0–0	Millwall	London
20:00 BST		(Report)		Stadium: Loftus Road; Attendance: 15,325; Referee: L. Probert

2 October 2010 10	Crystal Palace	1–2	Queens Park Rangers	London
15:00 BST	Cadogan 89'	(Report)	Taarabt 49'; Helguson 90+3'	Stadium: Selhurst Park; Attendance: 17,171; Referee: K. Friend

16 October 2010 11	Queens Park Rangers	0–0	Norwich City	London
15:00 BST		(Report)		Stadium: Loftus Road; Attendance: 18,059; Referee: A. Penn

19 October 2010 12	Swansea City	0–0	Queens Park Rangers	Swansea
19:45 BST		(Report)		Stadium: Liberty Stadium; Attendance: 16,742; Referee: S. Hooper

22 October 2010 13	Bristol City	1–1	Queens Park Rangers	Bristol
19:45 BST	Stead 16'	(Report)	Agyemang 84'	Stadium: Ashton Gate; Attendance: 14,552; Referee: L. Mason

30 October 2010 14	Queens Park Rangers	1–1	Burnley	London
15:00 BST	Taarabt 33'	(Report)	Alexander 45' (pen.)	Stadium: Loftus Road; Attendance: 15,620; Referee: I. Williamson

6 November 2010 15	Queens Park Rangers	3–1	Reading	London
15:00 GMT	Taarabt 27' (pen.); Orr (red card) 44'; Faurlín 61'; Smith 71'	(Report)	Long 68'	Stadium: Loftus Road; Attendance: 15,692; Referee: S. Tanner

9 November 2010 16	Portsmouth	1–1	Queens Park Rangers	Portsmouth
19:45 GMT	Lawrence 71' (pen.) (yellow card) 90' (yellow-red card)	(Report)	Connolly (red card) 67'; Smith 90+1' (pen.)	Stadium: Fratton Park; Attendance: 17,818; Referee: G. Ward

13 November 2010 17	Nottingham Forest	0–0	Queens Park Rangers	Nottingham
15:00 GMT		(Report)		Stadium: City Ground; Attendance: 22,859; Referee: A D'Urso

20 November 2010 18	Queens Park Rangers	3–1	Preston North End	London
15:00 GMT	Hulse 4'; Taarabt 56', 84'	(Report)	Connolly 88' (o.g.)	Stadium: Loftus Road; Attendance: 13,505; Referee: D. Phillips

27 November 2010 19	Queens Park Rangers	2–1	Cardiff City	London
15:00 GMT	Gorkšs 18'; Taarabt 68'	(Report)	Bellamy 13'	Stadium: Loftus Road; Attendance: 17,316; Referee: K. Friend

4 December 2010	Hull City	pp	Queens Park Rangers

10 December 2010 20	Queens Park Rangers	1–3	Watford	London
19:45 GMT	Smith 89'	(Report)	Graham 26', 48'; Mutch 30'	Stadium: Loftus Road; Attendance: 14,079; Referee: D. Deadman

18 December 2010 21	Leeds United	2–0	Queens Park Rangers	Leeds
15:00 GMT	Gradel 25', 70'	(Report)		Stadium: Elland Road; Attendance: 29,426; Referee: S. Mathieson

26 December 2010 22	Queens Park Rangers	4–0	Swansea City	London
13:00 GMT	Mackie 16'; Hill (red card) 19'; Helguson 61' (pen.); Taarabt 71', 80'	(Report)	Tate (red card) 19'	Stadium: Loftus Road; Attendance: 15,963; Referee: P. Crossley

28 December 2010 23	Coventry City	0–2	Queens Park Rangers	Coventry
12:15 GMT		(Report)	Westwood 49' (o.g.); Smith 61'	Stadium: Ricoh Arena; Attendance: 17,678; Referee: N. Swarbrick

1 January 2011 24	Norwich City	1–0	Queens Park Rangers	Norwich
15:00 GMT	R. Martin 10'	(Report)	Connolly (red card) 51'	Stadium: Carrow Road; Attendance: 26,273; Referee: J. Moss

3 January 2011 25	Queens Park Rangers	2–2	Bristol City	London
15:00 GMT	Faurlín 53'; Taarabt 85' (pen.)	(Report)	Pitman 50'; Caulker 90+1'	Stadium: Loftus Road; Attendance: 15,618; Referee: F. Graham

15 January 2011 26	Burnley	0–0	Queens Park Rangers	Burnley
15:00 GMT		(Report)		Stadium: Turf Moor; Attendance: 14,819; Referee: M. Jones

23 January 2011 27	Queens Park Rangers	2–1	Coventry City	London
13:15 GMT	Taarabt 45+3'; Routledge 79'	(Report)	King 25'	Stadium: Loftus Road; Attendance: 13,185; Referee: M. Haywood

29 January 2011 28	Hull City	0–0	Queens Park Rangers	Hull
15:00 GMT		(Report)		Stadium: KC Stadium; Attendance: 20,601; Referee: K. Hill

1 February 2011 29	Queens Park Rangers	2–0	Portsmouth	London
20:00 GMT	Taarabt 59'; Hill 73'	(Report)		Stadium: Loftus Road; Attendance: 14,078; Referee: G. Hegley

4 February 2011 30	Reading	0–1	Queens Park Rangers	Reading
19:45 GMT		(Report)	Ephraim (red card) 42'; Routledge 83'	Stadium: Madejski Stadium; Attendance: 18,982; Referee: R. Booth

13 February 2011 31	Queens Park Rangers	1–1	Nottingham Forest	London
13:15 GMT	Smith 16'	(Report)	Majewski (red card) 23'; McGoldrick 26'	Stadium: Loftus Road; Attendance: 17,227; Referee: M. Clatternburg

19 February 2011 32	Preston North End	1–1	Queens Park Rangers	Preston
15:00 GMT	Nicholson 64'	(Report)	Helguson 37'	Stadium: Deepdale; Attendance: 10,521; Referee: A. Haines

22 February 2011 33	Queens Park Rangers	2–0	Ipswich Town	London
20:00 GMT	Hill 77'; Helguson 83'	(Report)		Stadium: Loftus Road; Attendance: 16,587; Referee: K. Wright

26 February 2011 34	Middlesbrough	0–3	Queens Park Rangers	Middlesbrough
15:00 GMT		(Report)	Helguson 41', 61'; Taarabt 68' (pen.)	Stadium: Riverside Stadium; Attendance: 16,972; Referee: K. Stroud

5 March 2011 35	Queens Park Rangers	1–0	Leicester City	London
15:00 GMT	Miller 88'	(Report)		Stadium: Loftus Road; Attendance: 18,068; Referee: R. East

8 March 2011 36	Millwall	2–0	Queens Park Rangers	London
19:45 GMT	Morison 63'; Trotter 73' (pen.)	(Report)	Shittu (red card) 72'	Stadium: The Den; Attendance: 14,104; Referee: S. Tanner

12 March 2011 37	Queens Park Rangers	2–1	Crystal Palace	London
15:00 GMT	Helguson 20', 54' (pen.)	(Report)	Vaughan 40'	Stadium: Loftus Road; Attendance: 18,116; Referee: M. Atkinson

19 March 2011 38	Doncaster Rovers	0–1	Queens Park Rangers	Doncaster
15:00 GMT		(Report)	Ephraim 47'	Stadium: Keepmoat Stadium; Attendance: 11,747; Referee: P. Gibbs

4 April 2011 39	Queens Park Rangers	3–0	Sheffield United	London
19:45 BST	Routledge 29', 66'; Faurlín 52'	(Report)		Stadium: Loftus Road; Attendance: 14,535; Referee: K. Stroud

9 April 2011 40	Scunthorpe United	4–1	Queens Park Rangers	Scunthorpe
15:00 BST	Garner 28', 48'; O'Connor 58'; Duffy 79'	(Report)	Hulse 7'	Stadium: Glanford Park; Attendance: 6,061; Referee: E. Ilderton

12 April 2011 41	Barnsley	0–1	Queens Park Rangers	Barnsley
19:45 BST		(Report)	Taarabt 1'	Stadium: Oakwell; Attendance: 11,381; Referee: A. Bates

18 April 2011 42	Queens Park Rangers	0–0	Derby County	London
19:45 BST		(Report)		Stadium: Loftus Road; Attendance: 16,745; Referee: D. Deadman

23 April 2011 43	Cardiff City	2–2	Queens Park Rangers	Cardiff
12:45 BST	Bothroyd 6'; Bellamy 35'	(Report)	Taarabt 10', 71'	Stadium: Cardiff City Stadium; Attendance: 26,058; Referee: L. Mason

25 April 2011 44	Queens Park Rangers	1–1	Hull City	London
15:00 BST	Routledge 8'	(Report)	Amoo 81'	Stadium: Loftus Road; Attendance: 17,399; Referee: C. Webster

30 April 2011 45	Watford	0–2	Queens Park Rangers	Watford
15:00 BST		(Report)	Taarabt 77'; Smith 90+3'	Stadium: Vicarage Road; Attendance: 15,538; Referee: N. Swarbrick

7 May 2011 46	Queens Park Rangers	1–2	Leeds United	London
12:45 BST	Helguson 1'	(Report)	Gradel 38'; McCormack 68'	Stadium: Loftus Road; Attendance: 18,234; Referee: M. Clattenburg

=== FA Cup ===
8 January 2011 3rd Round	Blackburn Rovers (Premier League)	1–0	Queens Park Rangers	Blackburn
15:00 GMT	Hoilett 77'	(Report)		Stadium: Ewood Park; Attendance: 10,284; Referee: P. Walton

=== Carling Cup ===
10 August 2010 1st Round	Queens Park Rangers	1–3	Port Vale (League Two)	London
19:45 BST	German 62'	(Report)	Richards 30', 48'; Rigg 35'	Stadium: Loftus Road; Attendance: 6,619; Referee: G. Sutton

Friendly Matches

Date	Opponents	Venue	Score F–A	Scorers	Attendance
12-Jul-10	Tavistock v Queens Park Rangers	A			
14-Jul-10	Bodmin Town v Queens Park Rangers	A			
16-Jul-10	Torquay United v Queens Park Rangers	A			
21-Jul-10	Equipe Romagna v Queens Park Rangers	A			
25-Jul-10	Ravenna Calcio v Queens Park Rangers	A			
30-Jul-10	Queens Park Rangers v Plymouth Argyle	H			
17-Aug-10	Queens Park Rangers v Millwall	H			
24-Aug-10	Queens Park Rangers v Aldershot Town	H			
31-Aug-10	Queens Park Rangers v Ipswich Town	H			
7-Sep-10	Tottenham Hotspur v Queens Park Rangers	A			
14-Sep-10	Reading v Queens Park Rangers	A			
5-Oct-10	Queens Park Rangers v Southampton	H			
26-Oct-10	Queens Park Rangers v Wycombe Wanderers	H			
2-Nov-10	Queens Park Rangers v Hayes & Yeading	H			
11-Jan-11	Queens Park Rangers v Charlton Athletic	H			
18-Jan-11	Tottenham Hotspur v Queens Park Rangers	A			
9-Feb-11	Tottenham Hotspur v Queens Park Rangers	A			
15-Feb-11	Queens Park Rangers v Crystal Palace	H			
1-Mar-11	Queens Park Rangers v Crystal Palace	H			
15-Mar-11	Queens Park Rangers v Northampton Town	H			
29-Mar-11	Queens Park Rangers v Wycombe Wanderers	H			
12-Apr-11	Queens Park Rangers v MK Dons	H			

== Records and statistics ==
As of the end of the season.

=== Appearances ===
No.	Pos.	Nat.	Name	npower Championship		FA Cup		Carling Cup		Total	
No.	Pos.	Nat.	Name	Start	Sub	Start	Sub	Start	Sub	Start	Sub
1	GK	(Republic of Ireland)	Paddy Kenny	44	0	1	0	1	0	46	0
2	DF	(England)	Bradley Orr	29	4	1	0	1	0	31	4
3	DF	(England)	Clint Hill	44	0	1	0	0	0	45	0
4	MF	(England)	Shaun Derry	45	0	1	0	1	0	47	0
5	DF	(England)	Fitz Hall	12	7	0	0	1	0	13	7
6	MF	(Antigua and Barbuda)	Mikele Leigertwood	0	9	0	0	1	0	1	9
7	MF	(Morocco)	Adel Taarabt	43	1	0	0	0	0	43	1
8	FW	(England)	Leon Clarke	2	12	1	0	1	0	4	12
9	FW	(Iceland)	Heiðar Helguson	32	1	0	0	0	0	32	1
10	MF	(Hungary)	Ákos Buzsáky	9	10	0	0	0	0	9	10
11	MF	(Argentina)	Alejandro Faurlín	40	0	1	0	0	0	41	0
12	FW	(Scotland)	Jamie Mackie	25	0	1	0	1	0	27	0
13	DF	(Latvia)	Kaspars Gorkšs	42	0	1	0	0	0	43	0
14	MF	(Republic of Ireland)	Martin Rowlands	0	3	0	0	0	0	0	3
15	DF	(England)	Kyle Walker	20	0	0	0	0	0	20	0
15	MF	(England)	Wayne Routledge	20	0	0	0	0	0	20	0
16	DF	(England)	Matthew Connolly	33	2	0	0	1	0	34	2
17	MF	(England)	Lee Cook	0	0	0	1	0	0	0	1
19	FW	(Ghana)	Patrick Agyemang	0	19	0	0	0	0	0	19
20	FW	(England)	Rob Hulse	12	9	1	0	0	0	13	9
21	FW	(England)	Tommy Smith	23	10	0	0	0	0	23	10
22	DF	(England)	Peter Ramage	0	4	0	0	0	0	0	4
23	MF	(Norway)	Petter Vaagan Moen	1	5	1	0	0	0	2	5
24	GK	(Czech Republic)	Radek Černý	2	0	0	0	0	0	2	0
25	MF	(England)	Hogan Ephraim	19	9	0	0	1	0	20	9
26	DF	(England)	Gary Borrowdale	0	1	1	0	1	0	2	1
28	DF	(England)	Joe Oastler	0	0	0	0	0	1	0	1
29	FW	(England)	Ishmael Miller	4	8	0	0	0	0	4	8
30	MF	(England)	Romone Rose	0	0	0	0	0	1	0	1
33	FW	(England)	Antonio German	0	2	0	0	0	1	0	3
35	FW	(Antigua and Barbuda)	Josh Parker	0	1	0	0	1	0	1	1
36	MF	(Portugal)	Bruno Andrade	0	1	0	1	0	0	0	2
37	MF	(Cyprus)	Giorgos Tofas	0	1	0	0	0	0	0	1
38	DF	(England)	Michael Doughty	0	0	0	1	0	0	0	1
39	DF	(France)	Pascal Chimbonda	0	3	0	0	0	0	0	3
41	DF	(Nigeria)	Danny Shittu	5	2	0	0	0	0	5	2

=== Goalscorers ===
Rank	Player	FLC	FAC	LC	Total
1	(Morocco) Adel Taarabt	19	0	0	19
2	(Iceland) Heiðar Helguson	13	0	0	13
3	(Scotland) Jamie Mackie	9	0	0	9
4	(England) Tommy Smith	6	0	0	6
5	(England) Wayne Routledge	5	0	0	5
6	(Latvia) Kaspars Gorkšs	3	0	0	3
6	(England) Hogan Ephraim	3	0	0	3
6	(Argentina) Alejandro Faurlín	3	0	0	3
9	(Ghana) Patrick Agyemang	2	0	0	2
9	(England) Clint Hill	2	0	0	2
9	(England) Rob Hulse	2	0	0	2
12	(England) Fitz Hall	1	0	0	1
12	(England) Bradley Orr	1	0	0	1
12	(England) Ishmael Miller	1	0	0	1
12	(England) Antonio German	0	0	1	1

=== Clean sheets ===
As of 22 August 2015

Rank	Player	Position	Championship	League Cup	FA Cup	Total
1	(Republic of Ireland) Paddy Kenny	GK	24	0	0	24
2	(Czech Republic) Radek Černý	GK	1	0	0	1

=== Discipline ===
No.	Pos.	Nat.	Player	Yellow card	Red card
16	DF	(England)	Matthew Connolly	2	2
2	DF	(England)	Bradley Orr	6	1
25	MF	(England)	Hogan Ephraim	2	1
41	DF	(Nigeria)	Danny Shittu	0	1
4	MF	(England)	Shaun Derry	9	0
3	DF	(England)	Clint Hill	7	1^{a}
7	MF	(Morocco)	Adel Taarabt	8	0
11	MF	(Argentina)	Alejandro Faurlín	6	0
13	DF	(Latvia)	Kaspars Gorkšs	5	0
9	FW	(Iceland)	Heiðar Helguson	3	0
12	FW	(Scotland)	Jamie Mackie	3	0
15	DF	(England)	Kyle Walker	3	0
5	DF	(England)	Fitz Hall	2	0
8	DF	(England)	Leon Clarke	2	0
15	MF	(England)	Wayne Routledge	2	0
20	FW	(England)	Rob Hulse	2	0
10	MF	(Hungary)	Ákos Buzsáky	1	0
26	DF	(England)	Gary Borrowdale	1	0
29	FW	(England)	Ishmael Miller	1	0

=== Captains ===
No.	Pos.	Nat.	Player	Matches
7	MF	(Morocco)	Adel Taarabt	41
5	DF	(England)	Fitz Hall	4
4	MF	(England)	Shaun Derry	1

=== Overall league statistics ===
	Home	Away	Overall
Games played	23	23	46
Points Won	49	39	88
Wins	14	10	24
Draws	7	9	16
Defeats	2	4	6
Win Percentage	61%	43%	52%
Goals Scored	43	28	71
Goals conceded	15	17	32
Clean Sheets	12	13	25
Highest win	4–0	3–0	4–0
Biggest defeat	1–3	1–4	1–4
Yellow cards	25	37	62
Red cards	2^{a}	4	6

^{a} One red card was later rescinded
