= 2009–10 Queens Park Rangers F.C. season =

QPR
2009–10 season
- Chairman: Flavio Briatore (Until Feb 2010); Ishan Saksena (From Feb 2010)
- Managers: Jim Magilton (Until Dec 2009); Paul Hart (Dec 2009 – Jan 2010); Mick Harford (Jan 2010 – Feb 2010); Neil Warnock (From Mar 2010)
- The Championship: 13th
- FA Cup: Eliminated 3rd Round (v Sheffield Utd)
- League Cup: Eliminated 3rd Round (v Chelsea)
- Top goalscorer: League: Jay Simpson (12); All: Jay Simpson (13)
- Highest home attendance: 17,082 (v Leicester City)
- Lowest home attendance: 5,203 (v Accrington Stanley)
- Average home league attendance: 12,720
| Home colours | Away colours | Third colours |

During the 2009–10 season, Queens Park Rangers played in the Football League Championship, their sixth season of their spell at this level.

== Season review ==
=== New managerial team ===
Jim Magilton was announced as the replacement for Paulo Sousa as manager on 3 June 2009. John Gorman was named Magilton's assistant on 17 June, reprising his former role with Magilton at Ipswich Town.

=== Friendlies ===
Queens Park Rangers played their first pre-season friendly against Aldershot Town at The Recreation Ground. Rangers won the game 4–0 with goals from Ákos Buzsáky, Heiðar Helguson, Patrick Agyemang and Dexter Blackstock. Former Sunderland striker David Connolly featured in the game for the R's. The players then headed out to Slovenia for a game against NK Celje. The game ended 2–2, Angelo Balanta getting both goals for Rangers. They then went on to Croatia to play a game at NK Karlovac. The game ended 3–1 to the Croats, the R's goal coming through Rowan Vine. After returning to England Rangers beat Forest Green Rovers 2–0, with goals from Damion Stewart and Alessandro Pellicori, they then played Oxford United at The Kassam Stadium. The game ended 2–2 with goals from Gavin Mahon and Wayne Routledge.

After beating Wycombe Wanderers 2–1, with goals from Gavin Mahon and Patrick Agyemang, Rangers sent a team to Kettering Town and won the game 2–0 with goals coming from Heiðar Helguson and Alessandro Pellicori. In their last pre-season game, the R's beat Southampton 3–0 thanks to Kaspars Gorkss, Angelo Balanta and Adel Taarabt.

=== Season ===
QPR begun their season as hosts to Blackpool. The game ended 1–1, with defender Peter Ramage scoring on the 88th minute. Their streak continued with another 1–1 draw to Plymouth Argyle, with both QPR players on the scoreline. Helguson scored on the 43rd minute, with Gorkss making the game level deep into stoppage time.

The first loss of the season was away to Bristol, with Maynard scoring to break QPR's unbeaten streak. Next was a tricky home game to Nottingham Forest. The game ended 1–1, with Mikele Leigertwood scoring for the Hoops. They then went on to win the next game to Scunthorpe, with new loan signing Adel Taarabt scoring the winner in the 4th minute. QPR continued their streak with a draw to Peterborough, and beating promotion contenders Cardiff City 2–0. Their confidence shot in the next game against Barnsley, with 5 goals scored, including a brace from Buzsáky.

== Players ==
As of the end of the season.

=== First team squad ===
| No. | Name | Nationality | Position (s) | Since | Date of birth (age) | Signed from |
Goalkeepers
| 24 | Radek Černý | (Czech Republic) | GK | 2008 | 18 February 1974 (aged 36) | (Czech Republic) Slavia Prague |
| 32 | Elvijs Putninš | (Latvia) | GK | 2009 | 12 June 1991 (aged 18) | (England) Queens Park Rangers Academy |
| 37 | Shane McWeeney | (England) | GK | 2009 | 14 October 1989 (aged 20) | (England) Queens Park Rangers Academy |
Defenders
| 2 | Peter Ramage | (England) | CB | 2008 | 22 November 1983 (aged 26) | (England) Newcastle United |
| 3 | Damion Stewart | (Jamaica) | CB | 2006 | 18 August 1980 (aged 29) | (Jamaica) Harbour View |
| 13 | Kaspars Gorkšs | (Latvia) | CB | 2008 | 6 November 1981 (aged 28) | (England) Blackpool |
| 16 | Matthew Connolly | (England) | CB | 2008 | 24 September 1987 (aged 22) | (England) Arsenal |
| 20 | Matt Hill | (England) | LB | 2010 | 26 March 1981 (aged 29) | On loan from (England) Wolverhampton Wanderers |
| 26 | Duško Tošić | (Serbia) | LB | 2010 | 19 January 1985 (aged 25) | On loan from (England) Portsmouth |
| 27 | Lee Brown | (England) | LB | 2008 | 10 August 1990 (aged 19) | (England) Queens Park Rangers Academy |
| 28 | Joe Oastler | (England) | RB | 2008 | 3 July 1990 (aged 19) | (England) Bognor Regis Town |
| 35 | Josh Parker | (England) (Note: Parker was born in Slough, England, but also qualifies to represent Antigua and Barbuda internationally and would make his international debut for Antigua and Barbuda in November 2010.) | RB | 2009 | 1 December 1990 (aged 19) | (England) Queens Park Rangers Academy |
Midfielders
| 4 | Gavin Mahon | (England) | DM | 2008 | 2 January 1977 (aged 33) | (England) Watford |
| 6 | Mikele Leigertwood | (Antigua and Barbuda) (Note: Leigertwood was born in Enfield, England, but also qualified to represent Antigua and Barbuda internationally and made his international debut for Antigua and Barbuda in November 2008.) | DM | 2007 | 12 November 1982 (aged 27) | (Argentina) Sheffield United |
| 10 | Ákos Buzsáky | (Hungary) | CM | 2007 | 7 May 1982 (aged 28) | (England) Plymouth Argyle |
| 14 | Martin Rowlands | (Republic of Ireland) (Note: Rowlands was born in Hammersmith and Fulham, England, but also qualified to represent the Republic of Ireland internationally and represented them at U-21 level before making his international debut for the Republic of Ireland in 2004.) | CM | 2003 | 8 February 1979 (aged 31) | (England) Brentford |
| 15 | Nigel Quashie | (Scotland) (Note: Quashie was born in Southwark, England, and represented them at U-21 and B level, but also qualified to represent Ghana internationally through his father and Scotland through his grandfather and made his international debut for Scotland in May 2004.) | CM | 2010 | 20 July 1978 (aged 31) | (England) West Ham United |
| 17 | Lee Cook | (England) | LM | 2004 | 3 July 1982 (aged 27) | (England) Watford |
| 18 | Alejandro Faurlín | (Argentina) | CM | 2009 | 9 August 1986 (aged 23) | (Argentina) Instituto Atlético |
| 21 | Matteo Alberti | (Italy) | RM | 2008 | 4 August 1988 (aged 21) | (Italy) Chievo Verona Primavera |
| 25 | Hogan Ephraim | (England) | RM / LM | 2007 | 31 March 1988 (aged 22) | (England) West Ham United |
| 30 | Romone Rose | (England) | AM | 2008 | 19 January 1990 (aged 20) | (England) Queens Park Rangers Academy |
| 39 | Adel Taarabt | (Morocco) (Note: Taarabt was born in Fez, Morocco, but was raised in France and represented them at U-17 and U-19 level before making his international debut for Morocco in February 2009.) | AM | 2009 | 24 May 1989 (aged 20) | On loan from (England) Tottenham Hotspur |
Forwards
| 7 | Marcus Bent | (England) | CF | 2010 | 19 May 1978 (aged 31) | On loan from (England) Birmingham City |
| 8 | Rowan Vine | (England) | ST | 2007 | 21 September 1982 (aged 27) | (England) Birmingham City |
| 19 | Ángelo Balanta | (Colombia) | CF / LW | 2007 | 1 July 1990 (aged 19) | (England) Queens Park Rangers Academy |
| 23 | Jay Simpson | (England) | CF | 2009 | 1 December 1988 (aged 21) | On loan from (England) Arsenal |
| 33 | Antonio German | (England) | ST | 2009 | 26 December 1991 (aged 18) | (England) Queens Park Rangers Academy |
| 36 | Tamás Priskin | (Hungary) (Note: Priskin was born in Komárno, Slovakia (then Czechoslovakia), but also qualifies to represent Hungary internationally through his parents and represented them at U-21 level before making his international debut for Hungary in August 2005.) | ST | 2010 | 27 September 1986 (aged 23) | On loan from (England) Ipswich Town |

== Transfers ==
=== In ===
| Date | Pos. | Name | From | Fee | Source(s) |
|---|---|---|---|---|---|
| 7 July 2009 | MF | Alejandro Faurlín | Instituto Córdoba | £3,500,000 | |
| 30 July 2009 | FW | Alessandro Pellicori | Avellino | Free | |
| 22 January 2010 | MF | Nigel Quashie | West Ham United | Free | |

=== Out ===
| Date | Pos. | Name | To | Fee | Source(s) |
|---|---|---|---|---|---|
| 30 June 2009 | DF | Zesh Rehman | (Bradford City) | Released | |
| 30 June 2009 | MF | Liam Miller | (Hibernian) | Released | |
| 30 June 2009 | GK | Jake Cole | (Barnet) | Released | |
| 30 June 2009 | MF | Chris Arthur | | Released | |
| 30 June 2009 | MF | Danny Maguire | | Released | |
| 2 July 2009 | DF | Damien Delaney | Ipswich Town | Undisclosed | |
| 3 July 2009 | GK | Lee Camp | Nottingham Forest | Undisclosed | |
| 22 July 2009 | FW | Dexter Blackstock | Nottingham Forest | Undisclosed | |
| 26 January 2010 | MF | Wayne Routledge | Newcastle United | Undisclosed | |
| 1 February 2010 | MF | Gareth Ainsworth | Wycombe Wanderers | Free | |

=== Loaned in ===
| Start | Pos. | Name | From | Expiry | Source(s) |
|---|---|---|---|---|---|
| 23 July 2009 | MF | Adel Taarabt | Tottenham Hotspur | 30 June 2010 | |
| 15 August 2009 | GK | Tom Heaton | Manchester United | 8 November 2009 | |
| 27 August 2009 | FW | Jay Simpson | Arsenal | 30 June 2010 | |
| 1 September 2009 | MF | Ben Watson | Wigan Athletic | 1 December 2009 | |
| 9 November 2009 | DF | Tom Williams | Peterborough United | 1 December 2009 | |
| 19 November 2009 | DF | Steven Reid | Blackburn Rovers | 1 December 2009 | |
| 20 November 2009 | GK | Rhys Taylor | Chelsea | 4 January 2010 | |
| 6 January 2010 | GK | Carl Ikeme | Wolverhampton Wanderers | 1 May 2010 | |
| 25 January 2010 | DF | Matt Hill | Wolverhampton Wanderers | 1 May 2010 | |
| 1 February 2010 | FW | Marcus Bent | Birmingham City | 1 May 2010 | |
| 1 February 2010 | FW | Tamás Priskin | Ipswich Town | End of season | |
| 25 March 2010 | DF | Duško Tošić | Portsmouth | End of season | |

=== Loaned out ===
| Start | Pos. | Name | To | Expiry | Source(s) |
|---|---|---|---|---|---|
| 6 August 2009 | MF | Romone Rose | Northampton Town | 1 September 2009 | |
| 15 September 2009 | FW | Heiðar Helguson | Watford | 1 January 2010 | |
| 5 October 2009 | FW | Antonio German | Aldershot Town | 1 November 2009 | |
| 8 October 2009 | MF | Romone Rose | Cheltenham Town | 1 November 2009 | |
| 20 November 2009 | MF | Gareth Ainsworth | Wycombe Wanderers | 1 December 2009 | |
| 26 November 2009 | MF | Hogan Ephraim | Leeds United | 2 January 2010 | |
| 25 January 2010 | FW | Patrick Agyemang | Bristol City | 1 May 2010 | |
| 29 January 2010 | DF | Fitz Hall | Newcastle United | 1 June 2010 | |

== League table ==
| Pos | Team | Pld | W | D | L | GF | GA | GD | Pts |
|---|---|---|---|---|---|---|---|---|---|
| 11 | Middlesbrough | 46 | 16 | 14 | 16 | 58 | 50 | +8 | 62 |
| 12 | Doncaster Rovers | 46 | 15 | 15 | 16 | 59 | 58 | +1 | 60 |
| 13 | Queens Park Rangers | 46 | 14 | 15 | 17 | 58 | 65 | −7 | 57 |
| 14 | Derby County | 46 | 15 | 11 | 20 | 53 | 63 | −10 | 56 |
| 15 | Ipswich Town | 46 | 12 | 20 | 14 | 50 | 61 | −11 | 56 |

Source: The Football League
Rules for classification: 1) points; 2) goal difference; 3) number of goals scored.

== Results ==
- QPR scores given first

=== Football League Championship ===
| Game | Date | Venue | Opponents | Score | Scorers | Attendance | Points | Position | Notes |
|---|---|---|---|---|---|---|---|---|---|
| 1 | 8 August 2009 | Home | Blackpool | 1–1 | Ramage 86 | 14,013 | 1 | 13th | Report |
| 2 | 15 August 2009 | Away | Plymouth Argyle | 1–1 | Helguson 43 | 11,588 | 2 | 16th | Report |
| 3 | 18 August 2009 | Away | Bristol City | 0–1 | | 14,571 | 2 | 18th | Report |
| 4 | 22 August 2009 | Home | Nottingham Forest | 1–1 | Leigertwood 25 | 13,058 | 3 | 16th | Report |
| 5 | 31 August 2009 | Away | Scunthorpe United | 1–0 | Taarabt 3 | 5,866 | 6 | 15th | Report |
| 6 | 12 September 2009 | Home | Peterborough United | 1–1 | Routledge 34 | 11,814 | 7 | 13th | Report |
| P | 15 September 2009 | Home | Crystal Palace | P–P | | | 7 | 14th | Postponed |
| 7 | 19 September 2009 | Away | Cardiff City | 2–0 | Simpson 19, 40 | 20,121 | 10 | 12th | Report |
| 8 | 26 September 2009 | Home | Barnsley | 5–2 | Leigertwood 7, Buzsáky 15, 39, Watson 67, Simpson 79 | 12,025 | 13 | 8th | Report |
| 9 | 30 September 2009 | Away | Newcastle United | 1–1 | Watson 7 | 38,923 | 14 | 11th | Report |
| 10 | 3 October 2009 | Away | Swansea City | 0–2 | | 14,444 | 14 | 13th | Report |
| 11 | 17 October 2009 | Home | Preston North End | 4–0 | Taarabt 11, Buzsáky 63(p), Simpson 74, Routledge 85 | 12,810 | 17 | 10th | Report |
| 12 | 20 October 2009 | Home | Reading | 4–1 | Buzsáky 31, Simpson 39, Vine 71, Agyemang 83 | 11,900 | 20 | 10th | Report |
| 13 | 24 October 2009 | Away | Derby County | 4–2 | Taarabt 40, Mahon 47, Simpson 59, Buzsáky 90+1 (p) | 30,135 | 23 | 7th | Live on BBC; Report |
| 14 | 30 October 2009 | Home | Leicester City | 1–2 | Taarabt 33 | 17,082 | 23 | 7th | Live on Sky Sports; Report |
| 15 | 3 November 2009 | Home | Crystal Palace | 1–1 | Buzsáky 19 (p) | 14,377 | 24 | 6th | Report |
| 16 | 7 November 2009 | Away | Sheffield Wednesday | 2–1 | Simpson 10, Gorkšs 82 | 19,491 | 27 | 4th | Report |
| 17 | 21 November 2009 | Away | Doncaster Rovers | 0–2 | | 10,821 | 27 | 6th | Report |
| 18 | 28 November 2009 | Home | Coventry City | 2–2 | Simpson 35, Buzsáky 69 | 13,712 | 28 | 5th | Report |
| 19 | 5 December 2009 | Home | Middlesbrough | 1–5 | Agyemang 53 | 13,949 | 28 | 9th | Report |
| 20 | 7 December 2009 | Away | Watford | 1–3 | Agyemang 33 | 15,058 | 28 | 10th | Live on Sky Sports; Report |
| 21 | 14 December 2009 | Away | West Bromwich Albion | 2–2 | Olsson(og) 56, Gorkšs 62 | 21,565 | 29 | 12th | Live on Sky Sports; Report |
| 22 | 19 December 2009 | Home | Sheffield United | 1–1 | Leigertwood 2 | 12,639 | 30 | 10th | Report |
| 23 | 26 December 2009 | Home | Bristol City | 2–1 | Simpson 31, Leigertwood 40 | 13,534 | 33 | 8th | Report |
| 24 | 28 December 2009 | Away | Ipswich Town | 0–3 | | 25,349 | 33 | 10th | Report |
| P | 9 January 2010 | Home | Plymouth Argyle | P–P | | | 33 | 10th | Postponed |
| 25 | 16 January 2010 | Away | Blackpool | 2–2 | Taarabt 55(p), Connolly 84 | 7,600 | 34 | 11th | Report |
| 26 | 26 January 2010 | Away | Nottingham Forest | 0–5 | | 23,293 | 34 | 12th | Report |
| 27 | 30 January 2010 | Home | Scunthorpe United | 0–1 | | 13,105 | 34 | 12th | Report |
| 28 | 6 February 2010 | Away | Peterborough United | 0–1 | | 8,933 | 34 | 14th | Report |
| 29 | 9 February 2010 | Home | Ipswich Town | 1–2 | Simpson 66 | 10,940 | 34 | 17th | Report |
| 30 | 13 February 2010 | Away | Coventry City | 0–1 | | 15,247 | 34 | 17th | Report |
| P | 16 February 2010 | Home | Watford | P–P | | | 34 | 18th | Postponed |
| 31 | 20 February 2010 | Home | Doncaster Rovers | 2–1 | German 25, Simpson 76 | 11,178 | 37 | 17th | Report |
| 32 | 27 February 2010 | Away | Middlesbrough | 0–2 | | 17,568 | 37 | 20th | Report |
| 33 | 6 March 2010 | Home | West Bromwich Albion | 3–1 | Simpson 13, Connolly 18, Buzsáky 67 | 14,578 | 40 | 16th | Report |
| 34 | 9 March 2010 | Home | Plymouth Argyle | 2–0 | Taarabt 36(p), Stewart 49 | 12,013 | 43 | 15th | Report |
| 35 | 13 March 2010 | Away | Sheffield United | 1–1 | Taarabt 49 | 23,456 | 44 | 15th | Report |
| 36 | 16 March 2010 | Away | Reading | 0–1 | | 16,886 | 44 | 16th | Report |
| 37 | 20 March 2010 | Home | Swansea City | 1–1 | German 76 | 15,502 | 45 | 17th | Report |
| 38 | 23 March 2010 | Home | Derby County | 1–1 | Cook 45+2 | 12,569 | 46 | 17th | Report |
| 39 | 27 March 2010 | Away | Preston North End | 2–2 | Ramage 57, Priskin 66 | 12,080 | 47 | 18th | Report |
| 40 | 3 April 2010 | Home | Sheffield Wednesday | 1–1 | Faurlín 23 | 13,405 | 48 | 18th | Report |
| 41 | 5 April 2010 | Away | Leicester City | 0–4 | | 22,079 | 48 | 18th | Report |
| 42 | 10 April 2010 | Away | Crystal Palace | 2–0 | Buzsáky 11, Gorkšs 60 | 20,430 | 51 | 18th | Report |
| 43 | 17 April 2010 | Home | Cardiff City | 0–1 | | 12,832 | 51 | 18th | Report |
| 44 | 20 April 2010 | Home | Watford | 1–0 | Buzsáky 38(p) | 13,171 | 54 | 14th | Report |
| 45 | 24 April 2010 | Away | Barnsley | 1–0 | Leigertwood 27 | 11,944 | 57 | 13th | Report |
| 46 | 2 May 2010 | Home | Newcastle United | 0–1 | | 16,819 | 57 | 13th | Report |

=== FA Cup ===
| Round | Date | Venue | Opponents | Score | Scorers | Attendance | Notes |
|---|---|---|---|---|---|---|---|
| 3 | 3 January 2010 | Away | Sheffield United | 1–1 | Simpson 39 | 11,461 | Report |
| 3 (Replay) | 12 January 2010 | Home | Sheffield United | 2–3 | Buzsáky 71(p), Stewart 88 | 5,780 | Report |

=== League Cup ===
| Round | Date | Venue | Opponents | Score | Scorers | Attendance | Notes |
|---|---|---|---|---|---|---|---|
| 1 | 12 August 2009 | Away | Exeter City | 5–0 | Routledge 53, 61, 66(p), Pellicori 85, Ephraim 89 | 4,614 | Report |
| 2 | 25 August 2009 | Home | Accrington Stanley | 2–1 | Ephraim 68, Routledge 90+1 | 5,203 | Report |
| 3 | 23 September 2009 | Away | Chelsea | 0–1 | | 37,781 | Report |

=== Friendly matches ===
| Date | Opponents | Venue | Score F–A | Scorers | Attendance |
|---|---|---|---|---|---|
| 11-Jul-09 | Aldershot v Queens Park Rangers | A | 4-0 | Ákos Buzsáky, Heiðar Helguson, Patrick Agyemang Dexter Blackstock | |
| 15-Jul-09 | NK Cejie v Queens Park Rangers | A | 2-2 | Angelo Balanta 2 | |
| 19-Jul-09 | NK Karlovac v Queens Park Rangers | A | 1-3 | Rowan Vine. | |
| 21-Jul-09 | Forest Green Rovers v Queens Park Rangers | A | 2-0 | Damion Stewart Alessandro Pellicori, | |
| 24-Jul-09 | Oxford United v Queens Park Rangers | A | 2-2 | Gavin Mahon Wayne Routledge. | |
| 28-Jul-09 | Wycombe Wanderers v Queens Park Rangers | A | 2-1 | Gavin Mahon Patrick Agyemang | |
| | Kettering Town | A | 2-0 | Heiðar Helguson Alessandro Pellicori. | |
| 1-Aug-09 | Queens Park Rangers v Southampton | H | 3-0 | Kaspars Gorkss, Angelo Balanta and Adel Taarabt. | |
| 4-Aug-09 | Chelsea v Queens Park Rangers | A | | | |
| 26-Aug-09 | Watford v Queens Park Rangers | A | | | |
| 16-Sep-09 | Tottenham Hotspur v Queens Park Rangers | A | | | |
| 24-Nov-09 | Crystal Palace v Queens Park Rangers | A | | | |
| 19-Jan-10 | Queens Park Rangers v Luton Town | H | | | |
| 2-Feb-10 | Reading v Queens Park Rangers | A | | | |
| 31-Mar-10 | Fulham v Queens Park Rangers | A | | | |

== Statistics ==
=== Goalscorers ===
| Pos. | Nat. | Player | FLC | FAC | LC | Total |
|---|---|---|---|---|---|---|
| 1 | (England) | Jay Simpson | 12 | 1 | 0 | 13 |
| 2 | (Hungary) | Ákos Buzsáky | 10 | 1 | 0 | 11 |
| 3 | (Morocco) | Adel Taarabt | 7 | 0 | 0 | 7 |
| 4 | (England) | Wayne Routledge | 2 | 0 | 4 | 6 |
| 5 | (Antigua and Barbuda) | Mikele Leigertwood | 5 | 0 | 0 | 5 |
| 6 | (Latvia) | Kaspars Gorkšs | 3 | 0 | 0 | 3 |
| = | (Ghana) | Patrick Agyemang | 3 | 0 | 0 | 3 |
| 8 | (England) | Peter Ramage | 2 | 0 | 0 | 2 |
| = | (England) | Antonio German | 2 | 0 | 0 | 2 |
| = | (England) | Matthew Connolly | 2 | 0 | 0 | 2 |
| = | (England) | Ben Watson | 2 | 0 | 0 | 2 |
| = | (Jamaica) | Damion Stewart | 1 | 1 | 0 | 2 |
| = | (England) | Hogan Ephraim | 0 | 0 | 2 | 2 |
| 14 | (Argentina) | Alejandro Faurlín | 1 | 0 | 0 | 1 |
| = | (Hungary) | Tamás Priskin | 1 | 0 | 0 | 1 |
| = | (England) | Lee Cook | 1 | 0 | 0 | 1 |
| = | (England) | Gavin Mahon | 1 | 0 | 0 | 1 |
| = | (England) | Rowan Vine | 1 | 0 | 0 | 1 |
| = | (Iceland) | Heiðar Helguson | 1 | 0 | 0 | 1 |
| = | (Italy) | Alessandro Pellicori | 0 | 0 | 1 | 1 |
| TOTAL | | | 57 | 3 | 7 | 67^{a} |

^{a} 1 own-goal was also scored for QPR

=== Appearances ===
| No. | Pos. | Nat. | Name | League | | FA Cup | | League Cup | | Total | |
| No. | Pos. | Nat. | Name | Start | Sub | Start | Sub | Start | Sub | Start | Sub |
|---|---|---|---|---|---|---|---|---|---|---|---|
| 2 | DF | (England) | Peter Ramage | 29 | 4 | 2 | 0 | 1 | 0 | 32 | 4 |
| 3 | DF | (Jamaica) | Damion Stewart | 30 | 0 | 2 | 0 | 3 | 0 | 35 | 0 |
| 4 | MF | (England) | Gavin Mahon | 5 | 2 | 0 | 0 | 1 | 1 | 6 | 3 |
| 5 | DF | (England) | Fitz Hall^{2} | 12 | 2 | 0 | 0 | 0 | 0 | 12 | 2 |
| 6 | MF | (Antigua and Barbuda) | Mikele Leigertwood | 39 | 1 | 2 | 0 | 3 | 0 | 44 | 1 |
| 7 | FW | (England) | Marcus Bent^{3} | 2 | 1 | 0 | 0 | 0 | 0 | 2 | 1 |
| 7 | MF | (England) | Wayne Routledge^{1} | 25 | 0 | 2 | 0 | 2 | 1 | 29 | 1 |
| 8 | FW | (England) | Rowan Vine | 8 | 23 | 0 | 0 | 3 | 0 | 11 | 23 |
| 9 | FW | (Iceland) | Heiðar Helguson^{2} | 3 | 2 | 0 | 1 | 0 | 0 | 3 | 3 |
| 10 | MF | (Hungary) | Ákos Buzsáky | 29 | 10 | 2 | 0 | 3 | 0 | 34 | 10 |
| 11 | FW | (Ghana) | Patrick Agyemang^{2} | 5 | 12 | 2 | 0 | 2 | 0 | 9 | 12 |
| 12 | FW | (Italy) | Alessandro Pellicori^{2} | 1 | 7 | 0 | 0 | 0 | 2 | 1 | 9 |
| 13 | DF | (Latvia) | Kaspars Gorkšs | 40 | 1 | 2 | 0 | 3 | 0 | 45 | 1 |
| 14 | MF | (Republic of Ireland) | Martin Rowlands | 5 | 1 | 0 | 0 | 1 | 0 | 6 | 1 |
| 15 | MF | (Scotland) | Nigel Quashie | 4 | 0 | 0 | 0 | 0 | 0 | 4 | 0 |
| 15 | MF | (England) | Ben Watson^{1} | 16 | 0 | 0 | 0 | 0 | 0 | 16 | 0 |
| 16 | DF | (England) | Matthew Connolly | 16 | 2 | 0 | 0 | 2 | 0 | 18 | 2 |
| 17 | MF | (England) | Lee Cook | 8 | 8 | 0 | 0 | 0 | 0 | 8 | 8 |
| 18 | MF | (Argentina) | Alejandro Faurlín | 36 | 5 | 2 | 0 | 1 | 0 | 39 | 5 |
| 19 | FW | (Colombia) | Angelo Balanta | 1 | 3 | 0 | 0 | 0 | 0 | 1 | 3 |
| 20 | DF | (England) | Matt Hill^{3} | 15 | 1 | 0 | 0 | 0 | 0 | 15 | 1 |
| 20 | DF | (Cyprus) | Tom Williams^{1} | 5 | 0 | 0 | 0 | 0 | 0 | 5 | 0 |
| 22 | GK | (Nigeria) | Carl Ikeme^{1} | 16 | 0 | 0 | 0 | 0 | 0 | 16 | 0 |
| 22 | GK | (England) | Tom Heaton^{1} | 0 | 0 | 0 | 0 | 2 | 0 | 2 | 0 |
| 23 | FW | (England) | Jay Simpson^{3} | 34 | 5 | 2 | 0 | 1 | 0 | 37 | 5 |
| 24 | GK | (Czech Republic) | Radek Černý | 29 | 0 | 2 | 0 | 1 | 0 | 32 | 0 |
| 25 | MF | (England) | Hogan Ephraim | 16 | 6 | 0 | 1 | 2 | 1 | 18 | 8 |
| 26 | DF | (Serbia) | Duško Tošić^{3} | 5 | 0 | 0 | 0 | 0 | 0 | 5 | 0 |
| 26 | MF | (England) | Gareth Ainsworth^{1} | 0 | 1 | 0 | 0 | 0 | 0 | 0 | 1 |
| 27 | DF | (England) | Lee Brown | 0 | 1 | 0 | 0 | 0 | 0 | 0 | 1 |
| 28 | DF | (England) | Joe Oastler | 0 | 1 | 0 | 0 | 0 | 0 | 0 | 1 |
| 29 | DF | (England) | Gary Borrowdale^{2} | 18 | 3 | 2 | 0 | 2 | 1 | 22 | 4 |
| 30 | MF | (England) | Romone Rose | 0 | 1 | 0 | 0 | 0 | 0 | 0 | 1 |
| 33 | FW | (England) | Antonio German | 5 | 8 | 0 | 1 | 0 | 0 | 5 | 9 |
| 35 | DF | (England) | Josh Parker | 1 | 3 | 0 | 0 | 0 | 0 | 1 | 3 |
| 36 | FW | (Hungary) | Tamas Priskin^{3} | 13 | 0 | 0 | 0 | 0 | 0 | 13 | 0 |
| 36 | DF | (Republic of Ireland) | Steven Reid^{1} | 1 | 1 | 0 | 0 | 0 | 0 | 1 | 1 |
| 39 | MF | (Morocco) | Adel Taarabt^{3} | 32 | 9 | 0 | 1 | 0 | 2 | 32 | 12 |

^{1} Player left the club before the end of the season.
^{2} Player was out on loan for all or part of the season.
^{3} Player was on loan from another club for all or part of the season.

=== Clean sheets ===
As of 22 August 2015

| Rank | Player | Position | Premier League | League Cup | FA Cup | Total |
|---|---|---|---|---|---|---|
| 1 | (Czech Republic) Radek Černý | GK | 6 | 0 | 1 | 7 |
| 2 | (Nigeria) Carl Ikeme | GK | 1 | 0 | 0 | 1 |
| Total | | | 7 | 0 | 1 | 8 |
