= Danny Shittu =

Nigerian footballer (born 1980)

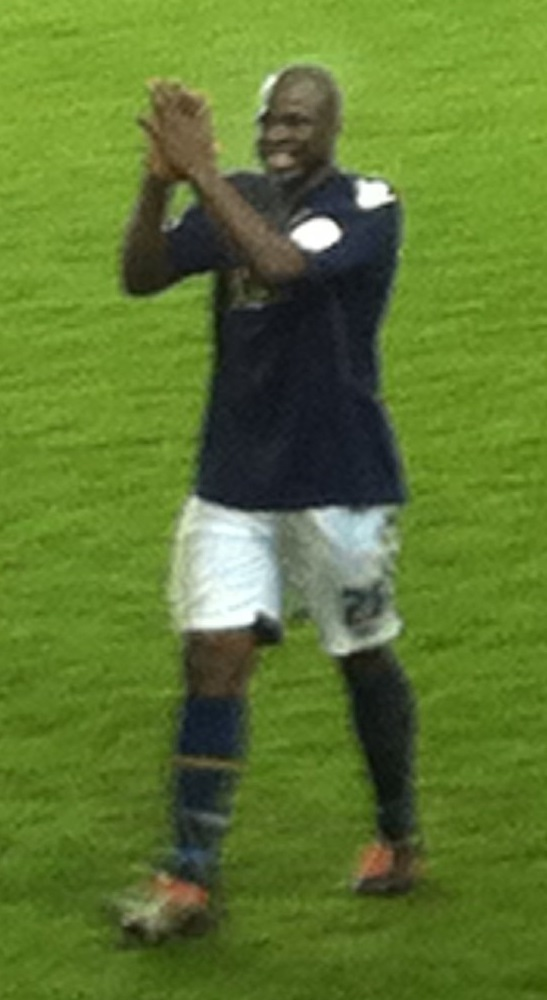
- Shittu in 2010

Personal information
- Full name: Daniel Olusola Shittu
- Date of birth: 2 September 1980 (age 46)
- Place of birth: Lagos, Nigeria
- Height: 1.91 m (6 ft 3 in)
- Position: Centre back

Youth career
- 1999: Norwich City

Senior career*
Years	Team	Apps	(Gls)
1999–2002	Charlton Athletic	0	(0)
2001	→ Blackpool (loan)	17	(2)
2001	→ Queens Park Rangers (loan)	18	(1)
2002–2006	Queens Park Rangers	145	(15)
2006–2008	Watford	69	(8)
2008–2010	Bolton Wanderers	10	(0)
2010–2011	Millwall	9	(0)
2011–2012	Queens Park Rangers	7	(0)
2012–2015	Millwall	69	(3)
Total		344	(29)

International career
2002–2010	Nigeria	32	(0)
- * Club domestic league appearances and goals

Daniel Olusola Shittu (born 2 September 1980) is a Nigerian former professional footballer who played as a centre back. He made 346 appearances in the Premier League and Football League, including 190 for Queens Park Rangers.

In his 16-year-long playing career, Shittu played for Norwich City, Charlton Athletic, Blackpool, Watford, Millwall and Bolton Wanderers. He played 32 games for the Nigeria national football team between 2000 and 2013.

== Early life ==
Born in Lagos, Nigeria, Shittu moved to England when he was seven years old and raised in the "tough area of London's East End". Growing up as "one of seven brothers and sisters", Shittu started out his football career in the youth team of Carshalton Athletic of the Isthmian League, but struggled and was released. Shittu grew up idolising former England and Arsenal defender Sol Campbell, who Shittu grew up just down the road from in the East End.

Shittu was a childhood friend of rapper Dizzee Rascal, who described Shittu as "like a big brother".

When he was seventeen years old, Shittu was on the verge of going to university, studying computer science for a degree. However, Shittu decided against going to university, having realised that: ‘I can't work in an office all my life – I'm going to be a footballer’’ and had ambitions by becoming a professional footballer. Shittu wrote letters to over 92 clubs for a trial, but three clubs responded with a no. But Charlton Athletic gave him a one-week trial after convincing the club's academy that he was good enough in a "20 minutes phone call". Eventually, his one-week trial at Charlton Athletic turned into a six-week trial, leading him to sign a one–year professional contract with them and begin to play football seriously.

== Club career ==
=== Early career ===
Shittu started his career at Charlton Athletic, after a trial at Norwich City as a teenager.

Two years after joining Charlton Athletic, Shittu signed a contract extension with the club, keeping him until 2003. Soon after signing a contract extension with the club, he was loaned out to Blackpool and scored on his debut on 22 February 2001, in a 2–0 win over Lincoln City. He then scored his second goal for the club on 30 April 2001, in a 3–2 win over Barnet. At the end of the season, Shittu appeared two times for the side in the Football League Third Division play-off before returning to his parent club, having "met the maximum number of days allowed" at Blackpool and the club was promoted after beating 4–2 Leyton Orient in the play-off finals. During his time there, he became a first team regular at Blackpool and became the club's fan favourite.

In the summer of 2001, Shittu was linked with a move away from Charlton, with Blackpool keen on signing him, but the move never materialised. But instead in October 2001, he was loaned out to Queens Park Rangers.

=== Queens Park Rangers ===
Shittu's debut for Rangers as a loanee, away at Peterborough on 23 October 2001 in a Football League One fixture, was rather inauspicious ending in his being sent off in the 83rd minute. His first goal came away at Chesterfield on 15 December 2001 in a game in which he was again sent off.

QPR acquired his services permanently for £350,000 in January 2002. He was bought by brothers Alex and Matt Winton, who also paid Shittu's wages during his first season at the club. His first game as a permanent player was the home fixture with Bury on 12 January 2002, which saw QPR win 3–0. Shittu then scored his first QPR goal as a permanent player on 1 April 2002, in a 3–2 win over Notts County. At the end of the 2001–02 season, Shittu went on to make twenty–seven appearances and scoring three times in all competitions.

Shittu went on to have a very successful spell at Loftus Road becoming a fan's favourite for his robust and combative performances in the heart of the defence. In the 2002–03 season, Shittu started the season well when he scored his first goal of the season, in a 4–0 win over Mansfield Town on 7 September 2002 and scored again two weeks later, on 17 September 2002, in a 3–-0 win over Huddersfield Town. On 2 February 2003, Shittu scored again, in a 4–2 win over Chesterfield. Shittu then went on to score three more goals between 15 February 2003 and 4 March 2003, against Port Vale, Swindon Town and Huddersfield Town. Shittu scored an opening goal in the derby on 19 April 2003, in a 2–0 win over Brentford. Despite missing out three matches, due to a groin injury sustained in November, He went on to be a part of the team that made it to the Division Two play-off final in 2003 where Rangers were narrowly beaten by Cardiff and the team that won promotion the following season. He made a total of 182 appearances in four seasons and scored 17 goals.

In the 2003–04 season, Shittu continued to be a first team regular for the side until he suffered a knee injury that kept him out for months in late–September, which he sustained during a 2–0 win over Sheffield United in the League Cup. On 24 November 2003 he returned to the first team, coming on as a second substitute, in a 3–0 win over Plymouth Argyle. Following this, Shittu regained his first team place once again until he suffered a knee injury that kept him out of the season. At the end of the 2003–04 season, Shittu went on to make twenty–four appearances in all competitions and the club were promoted to the Championship after finishing second.

Ahead of the 2004–05 season, Shittu regained his fitness when he returned to training and hoped he returned to action. However, Shittu continued to be in the sidelined for the side. On 18 September 2004 he returned to the first team, coming on as a substitute in the 78th minute, in a 3–2 win over Brighton & Hove Albion. After the match, Shittu later credited England Rugby player Lawrence Dallaglio as an inspiration to recover his injury. However, in October, Shittu suffered a medial knee ligament during a 1–0 win over West Ham United, resulting him out for six weeks. After returning to the first team the following month, Shittu scored his first goal of the season on 27 November 2004, in a 1–0 win over Cardiff City, which turns out to be a winning goal and scored again on 28 December 2004, in a 1–0 loss against Crewe Alexandra. Shittu went on to score two more goals later in the 2004–05 season against Ipswich Town and Sunderland. As the 2004–05 season, Shittu managed to regain his first team place since returning from injury and went on to make thirty–seven appearances and scoring four times in all competitions.

In the 2005–06 season, Shittu received a red card in the 54th minute for a foul, in a 3–0 loss against Coventry City on 20 August 2005. After serving a one match ban, Shittu returned to the first team from suspension and then scored his first goal of the season, in a 1–1 draw against Southampton on 10 September 2005. Shittu went on to score two more goals by the end of 2005 against Preston North End and Watford. On 31 January 2006 Shittu scored his fourth goal of the season, in a 3–2 loss against Leicester City. Despite missing out once in the league (in which he made forty–five appearances in the league), Shittu went on to make forty–six appearances and scoring four times in all competitions.

In the summer transfer window of 2006, Shittu became a subject of a transfer speculation from Premier League clubs, but the club won't sell him for less than £3 million. On 3 August 2006, Queens Park Rangers accepted a £1.5 million bid accepted from West Bromwich Albion, which the bid could rise to £3m, based on his performance.

=== Watford ===
On 6 August 2006 he was signed for £1.6 million by Premiership newcomers Watford. This move was controversial, as Shittu had passed a medical at West Bromwich Albion, before a late call from Watford manager Aidy Boothroyd. Prior to the transfer move, Shittu hinted a move to the Premier League a year before in an interview with London Evening Standard.

Shittu made his Watford debut, where he made his first start and played the whole game, as well as, being booked, in a 2–1 loss against Everton. Since making his debut, Shittu became a first regular for the side in the Premier League despite being left out of the squad on several occasions and has been praised by the Watford supporters. Shittu scored his first goal for the club in a 2–2 draw against Newcastle United in the League Cup on 7 November 2006. He powered a header past Newcastle goalkeeper Steve Harper to give Watford the lead. However Watford went on to lose the match on penalties. In a 4–1 loss against Middlesbrough on 7 April 2007, Shittu set up a goal for Damien Francis to only goal for the club in the game. Shittu scored his first Premier League goal on 5 May 2007 in a 2–0 win at Reading. Despite missing out, due to injuries, Shittu went on to make twenty–four appearances and scoring two times in all competitions in his first season at Watford. For his performance, Shittu was nominated for the Watford Observer Player of the Season Trophy, but finished fourth instead.

Ahead of the 2007–08 season, Shittu was linked away from the club, but Manager Aidy Boothroyd keen on keeping him at Watford. Shittu continued to be a first team regular at the start of the season and scored his first goal of the season on 16 September 2007, in a 3–2 win over Southampton. Shittu then scored three goals in two matches between 24 November 2007 and 27 November 2007 against Barnsley (twice) and Burnley. On 29 December 2007, Shittu scored against his former club, Queens Park Rangers, in a 4–2 loss. Shittu also scored twice in the FA third round on 5 January 2008, in a 2–0 win over Crystal Palace, which his performance was praised by Manager Boothroyd. After missing out several matches throughout January, due to international commitment, Shittu then managed to score both for and against his former club, Charlton Athletic on 16 February 2008. Several weeks later, Shittu scored his seventh league goal of the season on 4 March 2008, in a 1–1 draw against Norwich City. After a successful 2007–08 season with Watford in which Shittu scored 9 goals in all competitions, he was named in the PFA Championship team of the year.

Following the club's failure reach promotion back to the Premier League, Shittu was linked a move away from Watford, with Rangers keen on signing him. Watford accepted a bid from Rangers for Shittu and expected the move to happen. However, the move collapsed over personal terms and wage problems. Despite this, Shittu remained keen on moving to Rangers. Shittu left Watford in August 2008 to join Premier League side Bolton Wanderers for a fee of £2m plus further add-ons. He made 69 appearances scoring 8 times for Watford between 2006–2008.

=== Bolton Wanderers ===
Shittu joined Premier League club Bolton Wanderers on 6 August 2008, on a three-year contract, for £2m plus further add-ons, beating off competition from Scottish Premier League club Rangers. Upon joining Bolton Wanderers, Shittu said though he received offers abroad, he's keen on joining the club, citing playing in the Premier League once again.

Shittu made his debut for Bolton on 30 August during their 0–0 draw with West Bromwich Albion. He then went on to start the next two games against Fulham and Arsenal., but then did not make another appearance until 28 December in a 1–0 loss at home to Wigan Athletic. However, Shittu struggled to become a first team regular at Bolton Wanderers, spending most of the season on a substitute bench and his own injury concern. But he stayed at the club after being linked with a loan move to Derby County, which was turned down. He continued to stay at the club throughout the season despite interests from Birmingham City, Newcastle United and Sunderland. At the end of the 2008–-09 season, Shittu went on to make 10 league appearances for Bolton in his first season at the club, nine of which were starts.

Ahead of the 2009–10 season, Shittu was linked a move away from the club and was expecting to leave in the summer transfer window. At one point, Shittu was on the verge of joining financially strugglers, Portsmouth. However, his move to Portsmouth broke down after Manager Gary Megson admitted the chances of moving went “impasse”. He also turned down a move to Sheffield United on loan. Shittu did not make a single appearance during the 2009–10 season, only managing to make four appearances as an unused substitute. During Shittu's absence from the Premier League, he made regular appearances for the Bolton reserves team, playing with the likes of Nicky Hunt before his release.

In May 2010, it was reported that Shittu was a target for Kayserispor of the Turkish league. However, Shittu rejected the move, citing to stay in the UK. On 1 September 2010, the club announced that they had a come to an agreement with Shittu to release him from his contract. By the time of his departure, Shittu reportedly cost the club “more than £160,000 a game.”

=== Millwall ===
After leaving Bolton Wanderers, Shittu was offered a trial at Celtic, the trial never went ahead, as Shittu reportedly refused a week trial by them. He signed for Millwall on a three-month contract, on 20 October 2010 and made his Millwall debut three days later, on 23 October 2010, in a 2–0 win over Derby County.

Since making his Millwall debut, Shittu made an impressive string of performances that Manager Kenny Jackett offered him a new contract in January. However, he left the club on 25 January 2011 after his 93 days contract at Millwall expired and expected to sign for Queens Park Rangers.

=== Return to Queens Park Rangers ===
On 27 January 2011, Shittu rejoined Queens Park Rangers on a 6-month contract.

After appearing as unused substitute for the five matches since signing for the club, Shittu made his second debut for the club on 22 February 2011 in the 2–0 win over Ipswich Town. After the match, Shittu's performance, along with Fitz Hall, were praised by Manager Neil Warnock for keeping a clean sheet and hinted a partnership for games to come. However, in a 2–0 loss against Millwall on 8 March 2011, Shittu was sent–off in the second half for a professional foul, leading to a penalty scored by Liam Trotter. Although the match saw him received a mixed reception from Millwall supporters, Shittu was backed up his former teammate, Steve Morison, who believed that Shittu can bounce back following his sending off.

After impressive performances in the Championship winning season, Shittu was offered a new 12-month contract in June despite being on the substitute bench for several matches as the 2010–11 season progressed. The following month, Shittu signed a one–year contract with them. However, Shittu did not make the 25-man Premier League squad meaning he only appeared in Rangers' League Cup campaign. He was then released at the end of the season, making only one appearance the whole season.

Five years on, Shittu was later inducted to The Forever R's Club, considering the fact the club referred him as a “mountain man”.

=== Return to Millwall ===
On 13 August 2012, Shittu rejoined Millwall on a one-year contract following a successful trial. Upon joining the club, Shittu joined Millwall as a result of short of cover at centre-back following the injuries of Tamika Mkandawire and Paul Robinson.

Shittu made his second Millwall debut the next day on 11 April 2017 against Crawley Town in the first round of League Cup, where he came on as a substitute in the second half and played throughout extra time, leading to penalty shootout, as a result, Millwall went on to lose 4–1. After a rough start, having appeared as an unused substitute, Shittu regained his first team place and was then given a captaincy in absence of both captains Robinson and Trotter, in a match against Bristol City, which saw them draw 1–1 on 2 October 2012. In a 2–1 win over Bolton Wanderers on 6 October 2012, Shittu's performance throughout 90 minutes resulted him being named Man of the Match by the supporters. From that moment on, Shittu captained the side throughout the 2012–13 season and helped the side go 12-game unbeaten run along the way. On 25 January 2013, in the fourth round of the FA Cup, Shittu scored his first Millwall goal, in a 2–1 win over Aston Villa. On 13 March he scored the only goal, a header away to Blackburn Rovers to put Millwall into the FA Cup semi-final against Wigan Athletic at Wembley Stadium. Despite being sidelined twice, due to injury and suspension during the season Shittu finished the 2012–13 season, making forty–four appearances and scoring two times in all competitions. For his performance, Shittu was also voted player of the year for 2013. In addition, Shittu signed a two–year contract with the club, keeping him until 2015.

In the 2013–14 season, Shittu continued to remain as the club's captain in the absence of Robinson, who still injured, and started for the first six league matches before dropped for two matches following his performance in a 5–1 loss against Derby County on 16 September 2013. But following Mark Beevers’ injury, Shittu returned to the first team as captain on 28 September 2013, in a 2–0 win over Leeds United. Shittu then scored his first goal of the season on 2 November 2013, in a 2–2 draw against Burnley. However, Shittu was demoted to the substitute in number of matches by the end of 2013 before his return to the first team on 26 December 2013 against Watford was short–lived when he received a red card in early first half, in a 4–0. However, towards the end of the season, Shittu was sidelined again that ruled him out for the rest of the season. Nevertheless, Shittu went on to make twenty–three appearances and scoring once in all competitions. Shittu was also awarded the Junior Lions Player of the Year at the end of the season.

The 2014–15 season saw Shittu continuing to rehabilitate his injury and did not appear in the first team at the start of the season Nevertheless, Shittu did feature in the pre–season friendly match against Bromley on 21 July 2014 and then made his first appearance of the season on 12 August 2014, in a 1–0 win over Wycombe Wanderers in the first round of League Cup. Shittu then scored his first league appearance of the season on 25 October 2014, in a 1–0 win over Cardiff City. Two weeks later on 8 November 2014, Shittu scored again, in a 3–2 loss against Brentford. However, Shittu was dropped from the squad as the 2014–15 season progressed and never played again this season, spending time at the reserve instead. During the season, Shittu was awarded for the club's PFA Community Champion for 2013–14, as well as, the PFA Player in the Community at Football League Awards ceremony.

At the end of the season, making eleven appearances and scoring two times in all competitions, Shittu was among eighteen players to be released by the club following their relegation in the League One.

== International career ==
In March 2001, Shittu, just 19 at the time, received his first call up by the Nigeria for a friendly against Libya, but did not play. Shittu made his international debut for Nigeria against Paraguay on 26 March 2002, coming on as a second-half substitute, in a 1–1 draw. After several years absence from the international commitment, Shittu was called up by the national team for the first team in years.

He was a regular under coach Berti Vogts and played a significant role for the Super Eagles team that lost in the quarter-finals of the 2008 CAF Africa Cup of Nations to hosts Ghana. He was also in the back four for Nigeria at 2010 Africa Cup of Nations in Algeria as the side finished third.

Shittu was involved in the qualification for the 2010 FIFA World Cup making four appearances for the Super Eagles with his first coming in a 1–0 win away to South Africa on 6 June 2008. His second came in a 4–1 win at home over Sierra Leone. As well as the 0–0 draw away with Mozambique and the 1–0 home win in the reverse fixture.

Despite making no appearances for Bolton Wanderers in the 2009–10 season, Shittu was selected for the 23-man Nigeria squad for the 2010 FIFA World Cup in South Africa. He made his first appearance in the World Cup in their opening game of Group B against Argentina on 12 June 2010. After appearing two times against South Korea and Madagascar, Shittu was eventually dropped from the squad in September 2010. Although he was called up by the national team a year later, Shittu remained out of the first team.

In January 2013, Shittu joined the Nigerian squad for the African Cup of Nations tournament. However, the club were unwilling to let Shittu joined up the side for the tournament and because of this, Millwall would face sanctions as a result. Eventually, Shittu was dropped out the squad following the 23-man squad was made and was reportedly not interested playing in the tournament. Shittu later reflected on his international career, stating that he's proud of the international caps he earned.

== Personal life ==
In addition outside of football, Shittu has run Eastside Academy in London since 2002. Shittu also has interests in business, which he inherited from his family and is trying to make it as an entrepreneur. In 2010, Shittu also responsible for opening a project called 'Dan Shittu's Soccer Star Football Talent Hunt', stating that he wanted to "see Young Stars live their dream".

During his time at Millwall, Shittu also spoke out against racism on two occasions.

== Career statistics ==
=== Club ===
Appearances and goals by club, season and competition
Club	Season	League			National Cup		League Cup		Continental		Other		Total	
Club	Season	Division	Apps	Goals	Apps	Goals	Apps	Goals	Apps	Goals	Apps	Goals	Apps	Goals
Charlton Athletic	1999–2000	Division One	0	0	0	0	0	0	–		–		0	0
Blackpool (loan)	2000–01	Division Three	17	2	0	0	0	0	–		2	0	19	2
Queens Park Rangers (loan)	2001–02	Division Two	18	1	0	0	0	0	–		–		18	1
Queens Park Rangers	2002–03	Division Two	46	7	1	0	1	0	–		–		48	7
Queens Park Rangers	2003–04	Division Two	20	0	0	0	0	0	–		4	0	24	0
Queens Park Rangers	2004–05	Championship	34	4	1	0	0	0	–		2	0	37	4
Queens Park Rangers	2005–06	Championship	45	4	1	0	0	0	–		–		46	4
Queens Park Rangers	Total		145	15	3	0	1	0	0	0	6	0	155	15
Watford	2006–07	Premier League	30	1	2	0	2	1	–		–		34	2
Watford	2007–08	Championship	39	7	1	2	0	0	–		1	0	41	9
Watford	Total		69	8	3	2	2	1	0	0	1	0	75	11
Bolton Wanderers	2008–09	Premier League	10	0	1	0	1	0	–		–		12	0
Bolton Wanderers	2009–10	Premier League	0	0	0	0	0	0	–		–		0	0
Bolton Wanderers	Total		10	0	1	0	1	0	0	0	0	0	12	0
Millwall	2010–11	Championship	9	0	1	0	0	0	–		–		10	0
Queens Park Rangers	2010–11	Championship	7	0	0	0	0	0	–		–		7	0
Queens Park Rangers	2011–12	Premier League	0	0	0	0	1	0	–		–		1	0
Queens Park Rangers	Total		7	0	0	0	1	0	0	0	0	0	8	0
Millwall	2012–13	Championship	39	0	4	2	1	0	–		–		44	2
Millwall	2013–14	Championship	22	2	1	0	0	0	–		–		23	2
Millwall	2014–15	Championship	8	1	2	0	1	0	–		–		11	1
Millwall	Total		69	3	7	2	2	0	0	0	0	0	78	5
Career total			344	29	15	4	7	1	0	0	9	0	375	34

=== International ===
Appearances and goals by national team and year
National team	Year	Apps	Goals
Nigeria	2002	1	0
Nigeria	2003	0	0
Nigeria	2004	0	0
Nigeria	2005	1	0
Nigeria	2006	0	0
Nigeria	2007	8	0
Nigeria	2008	7	0
Nigeria	2009	3	0
Nigeria	2010	12	0
Total		32	0

== Honours ==
=== Club ===
Queens Park Rangers

- Football League Championship: 2010–11

Nigeria

- Africa Cup of Nations third place: 2010

=== Individual ===
- PFA Team of the Year: 2007–08 Football League Championship
- PFA Player in the Community: 2014–15
