= Rowan Vine =

English footballer (born 1982)

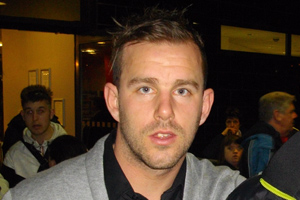
- Vine while on loan at Milton Keynes Dons in 2011

Personal information
- Full name: Rowan Lewis Vine
- Date of birth: 21 September 1982 (age 44)
- Place of birth: Basingstoke, England
- Height: 6 ft 1 in (1.85 m)
- Position: Forward

Youth career
- Portsmouth
- Southampton
- Portsmouth

Senior career*
Years	Team	Apps	(Gls)
2000–2005	Portsmouth	13	(0)
2002–2003	→ Brentford (loan)	42	(10)
2003–2004	→ Colchester United (loan)	35	(6)
2004–2005	→ Luton Town (loan)	45	(9)
2005–2007	Luton Town	57	(22)
2007–2008	Birmingham City	17	(1)
2007–2008	→ Queens Park Rangers (loan)	18	(4)
2008–2012	Queens Park Rangers	51	(5)
2010	→ Hull City (loan)	5	(0)
2010	→ Brentford (loan)	0	(0)
2011	→ Milton Keynes Dons (loan)	17	(1)
2011	→ Exeter City (loan)	5	(0)
2012	→ Gillingham (loan)	9	(1)
2012–2013	St Johnstone	35	(7)
2013–2014	Hibernian	10	(0)
2014	Greenock Morton	12	(4)
2015	Welling United	2	(1)
2015	Havant & Waterlooville	0	(0)
2015	Gosport Borough	7	(3)
2015–2016	Basingstoke Town	6	(1)
2017	Gosport Borough	3	(0)
2017	Southall	10	(4)
2017	Hayes & Yeading United	5	(1)
2017–2018	Hartley Wintney	15	(9)
2018	Gosport Borough	11	(3)
2018	Alresford Town		
2018	Hartley Wintney	6	(2)
2018–2019	Southall	8	(3)
2019	Moneyfields		
2019	Tadley Calleva		
2020–2022	Hemel Hempstead Town	0	(0)
Total		444	(96)

Managerial career
- 2023: Hartley Wintney
- * Club domestic league appearances and goals

Rowan Lewis Vine (born 21 September 1982) is an English former professional footballer who played as a striker.

Vine began his career at Portsmouth, spending time on loan at Brentford, Colchester United, and Luton Town, who he joined permanently in 2005 for an undisclosed fee, reported as £250,000. He then moved to Birmingham City, in January 2007 for a fee of £2.5 million, which rose to £3m when Birmingham were promoted to the Premier League that year. He then joined Queens Park Rangers (QPR), initially on loan in October 2007, before making the move permanent in January 2008 for a fee of £1 million. He then had loan spells at Hull City, Milton Keynes Dons, Exeter City, and Gillingham, before being released in 2012. He then moved to Scotland, playing for St Johnstone, Hibernian and Greenock Morton.

Vine then played non-league football for Welling United, Havant & Waterlooville, Gosport Borough (three spells), Basingstoke Town, Southall (two spells), Hayes & Yeading United, Hartley Wintney (two spells), Alresford Town, Moneyfields, Tadley Calleva and Hemel Hempstead Town.

== Career ==
=== Portsmouth ===
Vine was born in Basingstoke, and began his career at Portsmouth, making his way through the club's youth scheme. He made his first-team debut at the age of 18, in a goalless draw with Sheffield United in December 2000. However, he struggled to break into the side on a regular basis and was loaned out to Division Two side Brentford for the 2002–03 season.

Vine enjoyed a successful campaign at Griffin Park, netting his first ever goal on his debut in a 2–0 win at Huddersfield Town, and going on to score 13 further goals in 44 starts for the Bees. Despite his impressive season, he was again loaned out, this time to Colchester United for the 2003–04 campaign; he scored 10 league goals in 30 starts.

For the third year running, Vine spent an entire season away from Portsmouth on loan, this time at Luton Town for the 2004–05 season. Vine's nine goals helped the Hatters clinch the League One title. Despite this relative lack of goals for a striker during a season, a section in the Luton News newspaper showed that Vine was the "King of Assists" – one of the main reasons for the Hatters' success.

=== Luton Town ===
Vine signed for Luton for an undisclosed fee, reported as £250,000, on 4 July 2005. In his first season after his permanent move to the club, he scored 10 goals in 30 games after missing the start of the season with a back injury. Again, he was near the top of the assist charts. Vine's good form continued the following season, netting 12 goals in 26 league matches for Luton.

=== Birmingham City ===
A £2.5 million deal took Vine to Football League Championship club Birmingham City on 11 January 2007; the fee was to rise to £3m if Birmingham gained promotion to the Premier League. Vine's only goal in his short stay at Birmingham came in a 1–0 win over Derby County in March 2007, but he played 17 times as the club were promoted as runners-up.

=== Queens Park Rangers ===
On 2 October 2007, he joined Queens Park Rangers on loan, initially for a month, but later extended into the new year. On 8 January 2008, Vine joined the club on a four-and-a-half-year contract for a fee of £1million.

Vine suffered a serious fracture of his left tibia and fibula on 3 April 2008 during a training session. He did not make another first-team appearance until April 2009, and thereafter was used mainly as a substitute. Manager Neil Warnock told him in July 2010 that he had no future with the club, and was not given a squad number for the new season. He joined Hull City on a month's loan on 1 October, and made his debut the following day at the KC Stadium in a goalless draw with Coventry City.

On 25 November 2010 he started a loan period at Brentford until 4 January 2011, but never played. He joined Milton Keynes Dons on an initial one-month loan on 15 January, and scored his only goal for the club in a 4–1 win at Rochdale.

A trial with Doncaster Rovers in July 2011 came to nothing, and at the start of the 2011–12 season, Vine spent time on loan at Exeter City. In March 2012, he had a trial with Southend United, but manager Paul Sturrock expressed concerns over his fitness. He then signed for Gillingham on loan until the end of the season. He scored his only goal for Gillingham in a 2–1 defeat to Dagenham & Redbridge. Queens Park Rangers released Vine at the end of the 2011–12 season.

=== St Johnstone ===
Following a successful trial, Vine signed a one-year contract with Scottish Premier League club St Johnstone on 31 July 2012. He made his debut in the opening game of the season, and was sent off for a second bookable offence in the next, a 1–1 draw with Motherwell. Citing the poor example he set to his young son, he vowed to pull out of tackles in future rather than risk another sending-off. When scoring for St Johnstone, Vine celebrated by making a 'T' gesture.

On 15 September, Vine scored his first goal for the club, a curling effort ten minutes from time against reigning SPL champions Celtic that gave St Johnstone their first win of the season. After the match, he described the goal as "right up there" in his career highlights. He finished the season as joint top scorer in the league, with seven goals, but was not offered a contract extension. New manager Tommy Wright suggested it was down to budgetary constraints, but Vine was critical of the manner in which the club had handled his departure, accusing them of a lack of respect.

=== Hibernian ===
On 12 July 2013, Vine joined Scottish Premiership club Hibernian on a one-year deal, joining up with St Johnstone teammate Liam Craig. After a match against Celtic in October, opposing manager Neil Lennon was critical of Vine's tackling. Vine's retaliation on social media brought him a charge of "making offensive comments on Twitter suggesting the use of violence", but the Scottish Football Association let him off with a warning. After failing to score in 14 appearances, he was told by manager Terry Butcher that he would "struggle to break into the Hibs team", and in January 2014, his contract with Hibernian was cancelled by mutual consent.

=== Greenock Morton ===
As the January 2014 transfer window closed, Vine signed for Greenock Morton in the Scottish Championship. He left Morton in the summer of 2014 after the club were relegated.

=== Later career ===
Vine returned to England, where he signed for Conference Premier club Welling United in January 2015. He played only twice, and after a brief spell with Havant & Waterlooville, he joined National League South club Gosport Borough in October 2015. After a brief period with Basingstoke Town between 2015 and 2016, he rejoined Gosport in January 2017.

In February 2017, having made only three appearances since his return to Gosport, Vine joined Southall of the Spartan South Midlands League. At the beginning of the 2017–18 season, he moved to Hayes & Yeading United. Following a four-month spell with Hartley Wintney, Vine rejoined Gosport in March 2018.

In 2018–19, Vine played for Wessex League club Alresford Town before joining Hartley Wintney again in October and then re-joining Southall in December. He joined Moneyfields in February 2019 before joining Tadley Calleva in August 2019. Vine joined Hemel Hempstead Town as a player-coach for the 2020–21 season.

== Managerial career ==
=== Hartley Wintney ===
On 20 January 2023, Vine was appointed manager of former club Hartley Wintney. On 19 September 2023, it was announced that the club and Vine had parted ways.

== Career statistics ==
As of match played 3 October 2020

Appearances and goals by club, season and competition
Club	Season	League			National Cup		League Cup (Note: Includes Football League Cup, Scottish League Cup and Southern League Cup)		Other		Total	
Club	Season	Division	Apps	Goals	Apps	Goals	Apps	Goals	Apps	Goals	Apps	Goals
Portsmouth	2000–01	First Division	2	0	0	0	0	0	0	0	2	0
Portsmouth	2001–02	First Division	11	0	0	0	0	0	0	0	11	0
Portsmouth	2002–03	First Division	0	0	0	0	0	0	0	0	0	0
Portsmouth	2003–04	Premier League	0	0	0	0	0	0	0	0	0	0
Portsmouth	2004–05	Premier League	0	0	0	0	0	0	0	0	0	0
Portsmouth	Total		13	0	0	0	0	0	0	0	13	0
Brentford (loan)	2002–03	Second Division	42	10	3	2	2	1	3 (Note: Appearances in Football League Trophy)	0	50	13
Colchester United (loan)	2003–04	Second Division	35	6	7	4	1	0	6	2	49	12
Luton Town (loan)	2004–05	League One	45	9	3	0	1	0	0	0	49	9
Luton Town	2005–06	Championship	31	10	1	0	0	0	0	0	32	10
Luton Town	2006–07	Championship	26	12	1	1	3	1	0	0	30	14
Luton Town	Total		102	31	5	1	4	1	0	0	111	33
Birmingham City	2006–07	Championship	17	1	0	0	0	0	0	0	17	1
Birmingham City	2007–08	Premier League	0	0	0	0	2	0	0	0	2	0
Birmingham City	Total		17	1	0	0	2	0	0	0	19	1
Queens Park Rangers (loan)	2007–08	Championship	18	4	0	0	0	0	0	0	18	4
Queens Park Rangers	2007–08	Championship	15	3	0	0	0	0	0	0	15	3
Queens Park Rangers	2008–09	Championship	5	1	0	0	0	0	0	0	5	1
Queens Park Rangers	2009–10	Championship	31	1	0	0	3	0	0	0	34	1
Queens Park Rangers	2010–11	Championship	0	0	0	0	0	0	0	0	0	0
Queens Park Rangers	2011–12	Premier League	0	0	0	0	0	0	0	0	0	0
Queens Park Rangers	Total		69	9	0	0	3	0	0	0	72	9
Hull City (loan)	2010–11	Championship	5	0	0	0	0	0	0	0	5	0
Brentford (loan)	2010–11	League One	0	0	0	0	0	0	0	0	0	0
Milton Keynes Dons (loan)	2010–11	League One	17	1	0	0	0	0	0	0	17	1
Exeter City (loan)	2011–12	League One	5	0	0	0	0	0	1	0	6	0
Gillingham (loan)	2011–12	League Two	9	1	0	0	0	0	0	0	9	1
St Johnstone	2012–13	Scottish Premier League	35	7	1	0	1	0	0	0	37	7
Hibernian	2013–14	Scottish Premiership	10	0	0	0	2	0	2 (Note: Appearances in UEFA Europa League)	0	14	0
Greenock Morton	2013–14	Scottish Championship	12	4	0	0	0	0	0	0	12	4
Welling United	2014–15	Conference Premier	2	1	0	0	0	0	0	0	2	1
Havant & Waterlooville	2015–16	National League South	0	0	0	0	0	0	0	0	0	0
Gosport Borough	2015–16	National League South	7	3	0	0	0	0	1 (Note: Appearance(s) in FA Trophy)	0	8	3
Basingstoke Town	2015–16	National League South	6	1	0	0	0	0	0	0	6	1
Gosport Borough	2016–17	National League South	3	0	0	0	0	0	0	0	3	0
Southall	2016–17	Spartan South Midlands League First Division	10	4	0	0	0	0	1 (Note: Appearance in FA Vase)	1	11	5
Hayes & Yeading United	2017–18	Southern League First Division East	5	1	6	1	0	0	0	0	11	2
Hartley Wintney	2017–18	Southern League First Division East	15	9	0	0	1	0	5 (Note: Four appearances and one goal in FA Trophy, one appearance in Hampshire Senior Cup)	1	21	10
Gosport Borough	2017–18	Southern League Premier Division	11	3	0	0	0	0	0	0	11	3
Alresford Town	2018–19	Wessex League Premier Division	No data currently available									
Hartley Wintney	2018–19	Southern League Premier Division South	6	2	0	0	1	0	3 (Note: Two appearances in FA Trophy, one in Hampshire Senior Cup)	0	10	2
Southall	2018–19	Combined Counties League Premier Division	8	3	0	0	0	0	0	0	8	3
Moneyfields	2018–19	Southern League Division One South	No data currently available									
Tadley Calleva	2019–20	Wessex League Premier Division	No data currently available									
Hemel Hempstead Town	2020–21	National League South	0	0	1	0	0	0	0	0	1	0
Career total			444	96	23	8	17	2	22	4	506	110

== Honours ==
Luton Town

- Football League One: 2004–05

Birmingham City

- Football League Championship second-place promotion: 2006–07

Individual

- Football League One Player of the Month: September 2004
