= Ákos Buzsáky =

Hungarian footballer (born 1982)

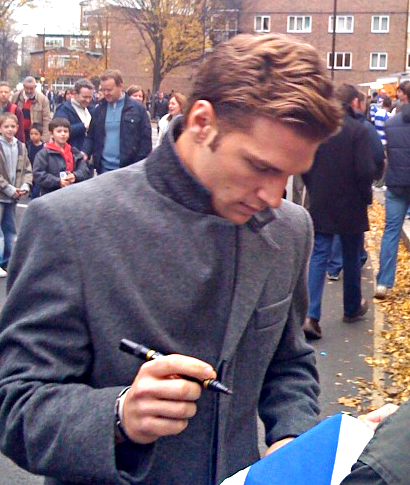
- Buzsáky signing a Queens Park Rangers jersey outside Loftus Road in 2008

Personal information
- Full name: Ákos Buzsáky
- Date of birth: 7 May 1982 (age 44)
- Place of birth: Budapest, Hungary
- Height: 1.80 m (5 ft 11 in)
- Position: Midfielder

Youth career
- 1998–1999: MTK Budapest

Senior career*
Years	Team	Apps	(Gls)
1999–2002	MTK Budapest	53	(5)
2002–2005	Porto	3	(0)
2003–2004	→ Académica (loan)	11	(0)
2005	→ Plymouth Argyle (loan)	15	(1)
2005–2008	Plymouth Argyle	81	(7)
2007	→ Queens Park Rangers (loan)	12	(6)
2008–2012	Queens Park Rangers	102	(17)
2012–2013	Portsmouth	6	(0)
2012	→ Barnsley (loan)	5	(0)
2013–2015	Ferencváros	4	(0)
Total		292	(36)

International career
2005–2012	Hungary	20	(2)
- * Club domestic league appearances and goals

Ákos Buzsáky (born 7 May 1982) is a Hungarian former professional footballer who played as a midfielder.

He played in the Nemzeti Bajnokság for MTK Budapest and Ferencváros, the Primeira Liga for Porto, the Premier League for Queens Park Rangers, and the Football League for Plymouth Argyle, Queens Park Rangers, Portsmouth and Barnsley. Buzsáky has been capped at international level by the Hungary national team, for whom he made his debut in 2005.

== Club career ==
=== Early years ===
Buzsáky was born in Budapest. He began playing football at the age of four when playing with his father, and this led to an opportunity to join the youth team Grund FC in 1986 when Buzsáky was six years old. His impressive talent enabled him to join his first club MTK Budapest. At this time under manager Henk ten Cate, MTK began to give youngsters opportunities to play in the first team, and among those given the chance to impress was Buzsáky, making his Champions League debut in the second round with a 5–1 (on aggregate) against ÍBV. Buzsáky made his league debut on 3 October 1999 in a match against Haladás, and on 22 April 2000, Buzsáky scored his first goal in a 3–1 win over against ZTE. In 2000, he won the Hungarian Cup with MTK and Buzsáky was linked with a move to NAC Breda, reuniting him with Henk ten Cate, but the club rejected the offer for Buzsáky. Buzsáky would go on to become a regular at MTK Budapest.

=== Porto ===
Buzsáky then joined Porto under new manager José Mourinho for £400,000 in July 2002. After signing, he had to wait eight months to make his league debut (in a 3–0 win over Beira-Mar on 23 February 2003). The previous month he had made his first appearance for Porto in the UEFA Cup against Denizlispor playing 90 minutes (the match finished in a 2–2 draw).

He was later loaned out to Portuguese Superliga side Academica de Coimbra in 2003–04 making eleven appearances. Prior to signing for English side Plymouth Argyle he had been playing for Porto's 'B' side in the Portuguese third division.

=== Plymouth Argyle ===
Buzsáky joined Plymouth on loan until the end of the 2004–05 season after the former Hungarian Under-21 international captain impressed manager Bobby Williamson during a behind-closed-doors friendly against Torquay United. Buzsáky moved to Plymouth on a permanent basis for an undisclosed fee.

In October 2007, Buzsáky informed Plymouth he would not sign a new contract when his ran out in the summer, allegedly due to Plymouth's refusal to pay a fee to his agent. He was subsequently loaned to Queens Park Rangers, and the move was made permanent on 2 January 2008 for an undisclosed fee, with Buzsáky signing a two-and-a-half-year contract.

=== Queens Park Rangers ===
On 3 November 2007, Buzsáky made his debut in a 2–0 win over Hull City and score his first goal, the next game three days later, in a 2–1 loss against Coventry City. Buzsáky won the Kiyan Prince Goal of the Season award for a side footed lob against Blackpool.

However, his first full season at QPR proved to be a frustrating one due to an injury he picked up in a League Cup tie away to Manchester United, resulting in him being out for the rest of the season. Afterwards, Buzsáky spoke about his injury, stating he had never suffered a knee injury before and vowed to bounce back next season.

Following his return to fitness, Buzsáky played a large part in the opening part of the 2009–10 season. However, in December 2009, following the 3–1 defeat away to Watford, it was reported that he was involved in a confrontation with manager Jim Magilton, where it was reported that Buzsáky was assaulted by Magilton. This led to Magilton being suspended by QPR and subsequently leaving the club by mutual consent on 16 December 2009. There was speculation that Buzsáky had requested a transfer but this was denied by Buzsáky.

On 21 January 2012, Buzsáky scored his first Premier League goal against Wigan in a 3–1 victory., but at the end of the season, on 13 July 2012, it was announced that Buzsáky would be leaving the club, having failed to agree on a new contract.

Whilst he decided his next move, Buzsáky trained in his native Hungary, with Hungarian outfit Videoton. Buzsáky was linked with Championship sides like Nottingham Forest and Bristol City.

=== Portsmouth ===
On 27 September, it was reported that Buzsáky was on trial with League One side Portsmouth and on 1 October 2012, Buzsáky agreed terms on a one-month deal with the League One outfit. He made his debut, coming on as a substitute, in the 2–2 away draw at MK Dons on 6 October 2012. He made six appearances for the club before joining Barnsley on loan. Buzsáky spoke about joining Portsmouth, citing building his fitness as the principal reason, and admitted he was keen to stay at the club. However, in January 2013, he left Portsmouth as a free agent to live in his home country of Hungary whilst he recovered from a knee operation. Portsmouth's caretaker manager Guy Whittingham claimed Buzsáky asked to leave the club after being left out of the first-team.

In May 2013, Buzsáky said that he would love to play for Plymouth Argyle again at some point, but now was not the right time. He was responding to speculation about his future and a possible return to Argyle. "I have seen the same speculation about me saying I was going back to Plymouth, but that is not the case," he said in an interview with The Herald. "Everybody knows how much the club and the place means to me, so I am keen that the Argyle fans know the truth. But, like I say, while I would love to play someday again for Argyle, now is not the right time."

=== Ferencváros ===
On 11 September 2013, Buzsáky returned to Hungary to sign for Ferencváros. He announced his retirement from professional football on 13 October 2015 due to injury problems.

== International career ==
Buzsáky represented Hungary as a full international, gaining his first cap on 3 September 2005 against Malta in Budapest. He scored his first international goal on 21 November 2007 in a Euro 2008 qualifier, a 2–1 defeat at home against European champions Greece, although the goal is sometimes given as a Kostas Katsouranis own goal as it took a big deflection off the Greek midfielder.

== Personal life ==
On 26 August 2026, it was reported by Hungarian media that Buzsáky had been missing for more than a week, and that police were looking for him. Two days later, he announced that he was safe and had never been in danger, only taking some time to himself after a difficult period in his life.

== Career statistics ==
=== Club ===
As of 6 November 2012

Appearances and goals by club, season and competition
Club	Season	League			National cup		League cup		Europa		Total	
Club	Season	Division	App	Goals	App	Goals	App	Goals	App	Goals	App	Goals
MTK Hungária	1999–2000	Nemzeti Bajnokság I	6	1	–		–		–		6	1
MTK Hungária	2000–01	Nemzeti Bajnokság I	24	3	–		–		1	0	25	3
MTK Hungária	2001–02	Nemzeti Bajnokság I	23	1	–		–		–		23	1
MTK Hungária	Total		53	5	0	0	0	0	1	0	54	5
Porto	2002–03	Primeira Liga	3	0	–		–		1	0	4	0
Académica de Coimbra (loan)	2003–04	Primeira Liga	11	0	–		–		–		11	0
Plymouth Argyle (loan)	2004–05	EFL Championship	15	1	–		–		–		15	1
Plymouth Argyle	2005–06	EFL Championship	34	4	1	0	2	1	–		37	5
Plymouth Argyle	2006–07	EFL Championship	36	3	3	0	1	0	–		40	3
Plymouth Argyle	2007–08	EFL Championship	11	0	–		2	0	–		13	0
Plymouth Argyle	Total		81	7	4	0	3	1	0	0	88	8
Queens Park Rangers (loan)	2007–08	EFL Championship	12	6	–		–		–		12	6
Queens Park Rangers	2007–08	EFL Championship	15	4	1	0	–		–		16	4
Queens Park Rangers	2008–09	EFL Championship	11	1	–		2	0	–		13	1
Queens Park Rangers	2009–10	EFL Championship	39	10	2	1	3	0	–		31	8
Queens Park Rangers	2010–11	EFL Championship	16	0	0	0	0	0	–		16	0
Queens Park Rangers	2011–12	Premier League	15	2	3	0	0	0	–		15	2
Queens Park Rangers	Total		74	15	3	1	5	0	0	0	82	15
Portsmouth	2012–13	EFL League One	6	0	1	0	–		1	0	8	0
Career total			228	31	8	1	8	1	2	0	246	33

=== International ===
As of 14 November 2008

Team	Years	Friendlies		International Competition		Total	
Team	Years	App	Conceded	App	Conceded	App	Conceded
Hungary	2008	2	0	2	–	4	0
Hungary	2007	2	0	4	1	6	1
Hungary	2006	0	0	–	–	0	0
Hungary	2005	–	–	3	0	3	0
Total		4	0	9	1	13	1

#	Date	Venue	Opponent	Score	Result	Competition
1.	21 November 2007	Budapest, Hungary	Greece	1–2	Loss	UEFA Euro 2008 Qual.
2.	14 October 2009	Copenhagen, Denmark	Denmark	0–1	Win	FIFA World Cup 2010 Qual.

== Honours ==
MTK Hungária

- Hungarian Cup: 2000
- Hungarian League runner-up: 2000

Porto

- Primeira Liga: 2002–03
- UEFA Cup: 2002–03
- Supertaça Cândido de Oliveira: 2003

Queens Park Rangers

- Football League Championship: 2010–11

Individual

- Young Hungarian Player of the Year: 2003
- Football League Championship Player of the Month: January 2007
