= Kaspars Gorkšs =

Latvian footballer (born 1981)

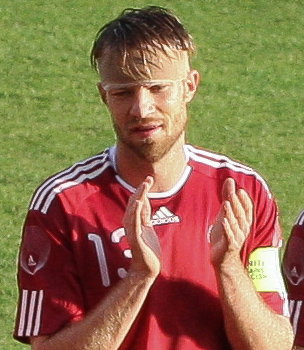
- Gorkšs playing for Latvia in 2011

Personal information
- Full name: Kaspars Gorkšs
- Date of birth: 6 November 1981 (age 45)
- Place of birth: Riga, Latvia
- Height: 1.92 m (6 ft 4 in)
- Position: Defender

Senior career*
Years	Team	Apps	(Gls)
1997–2002	Auda Rīga	77	(9)
2002–2004	Öster	32	(1)
2005	Assyriska Föreningen	23	(0)
2005–2006	Ventspils	28	(5)
2006–2008	Blackpool	50	(6)
2008–2011	Queens Park Rangers	114	(6)
2011–2014	Reading	81	(7)
2013	→ Wolverhampton Wanderers (loan)	15	(0)
2014–2015	Colchester United	7	(1)
2015	Ergotelis	13	(2)
2015–2016	Dukla Prague	23	(3)
2016–2017	Liepāja	13	(0)
2017	Riga	20	(3)
2018	Auda Rīga	1	(0)
Total		497	(43)

International career
2001–2003	Latvia U21	12	(0)
2005–2017	Latvia	89	(5)
- * Club domestic league appearances and goals

Kaspars Gorkšs (born 6 November 1981) is a Latvian former professional footballer who played as a defender. Gorkšs was also the captain of the Latvia national team. From 2018 to 2019 Gorkšs served as president of the Latvian Football Federation. After his football career, he turned to a career in business and politics. In 2026, he became the Director of the State Chancellery of Latvia.

Gorkšs firstly established himself in his native Latvia before moving to English football in 2006 with Blackpool. He has twice won promotion to the Premier League, with Queens Park Rangers and Reading.

== Club career ==
=== Early career ===
Born in Riga, Gorkšs began his career at FK Auda, scoring nine goals in 77 appearances. After a week-long trial, he joined Swedish club, Östers IF in December 2002, playing in the Allsvenskan, the Swedish top flight. He moved to Assyriska Föreningen in 2005, who were then in the Allsvenskan. He moved back to Latvia in 2006, signing for FK Ventspils, and he scored five goals for Ventspils in the clubs Championship winning 2006 Virslīga season. He also played for Ventspils in the second qualifying round of the 2006–07 UEFA Cup, against English Premier League club Newcastle United.

=== Blackpool ===
Gorkšs moved to Championship side Blackpool on 1 January 2007, having already agreed the transfer during December. On 20 August 2007, Gorkšs was named in the Press Association's Championship "Team of the Week". Eight days later, Gorkšs scored his first goals for Blackpool in a League Cup second-round tie at Derby County. The Latvian's two goals were both equalisers – one in normal time and the second in extra time – in a game that went to a penalty-shootout, won by Blackpool 7–6. On 1 October, Gorkšs was again named in the Press Association's Championship "Team of the Week".

Gorkšs scored his first league goal for Blackpool, in their 1–0 victory over Scunthorpe United at Bloomfield Road on 10 November 2007. On 29 December 2007, he was named as runner-up in the annual Latvian Player of the Year Awards by the Latvian Football Federation behind the winner, Vitālijs Astafjevs of Skonto. He was named in the Championship "Team of the Week" for a third time on 25 February 2008, alongside teammate Stephen McPhee, and again on 10 March. He was named as the Yorkshire Seasiders Player of the Year on 6 May. The following day, Blackpool activated an option to extend his contract with the club by one year.

Following the season, his first full season in English football, in which he had become a regular in the Blackpool side and scored seven goals, Gorkšs was linked with moves to various clubs, including Scottish Premier League club Rangers, as well as fellow Championship clubs Burnley, Crystal Palace, Norwich City, Preston North End and Watford; however, he dismissed the moves as just rumours, stating, "From my point of view it's just a case of carrying on and seeing what happens, that's all I can really do." On 29 May, both he and fellow Blackpool player Wes Hoolahan were linked with a move to Norwich City.

=== Queens Park Rangers ===
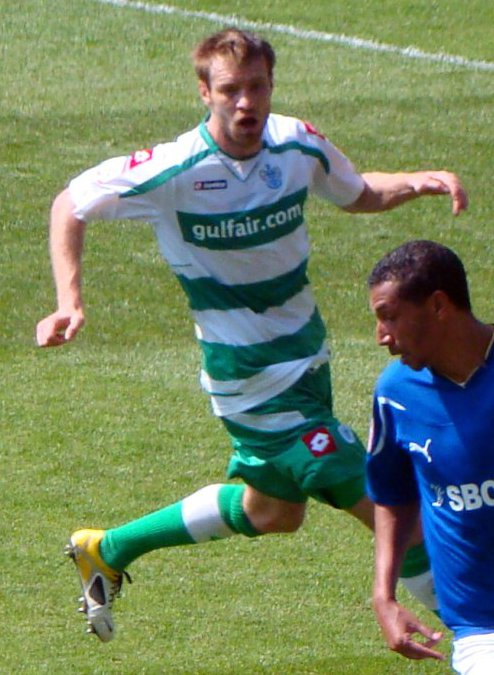
Gorkšs playing for Queens Park Rangers in 2011

On 12 June 2008, Queens Park Rangers confirmed that they had made an official bid to sign Gorkšs. However, on 17 June, Blackpool issued a brief statement, stating that they had reported QPR to the Football Association, and the Football League, for what they claimed was an illegal approach for Gorkšs. Blackpool manager Simon Grayson stated, "we've got to protect the interests of our club and we're led to believe there's been an illegal approach." On 18 June, the Football League, who would be adjudicating on the matter, confirmed that they could block the move, if QPR were found to have "tapped up the player", and that the matter could be referred to a disciplinary commission.

On 4 July, it was incorrectly reported in the Latvian media that Gorkšs had signed a contract with QPR. QPR announced on their official website that they had been given permission to speak with the player, and that he had agreed personal terms. However, this was strongly denied by Blackpool, whose club chairman, Karl Oyston stated, "We definitely have not given them permission to speak to him. I'm disappointed once again with the way they've gone about their business." The statement on the QPR official website was later removed.

On 28 July, Gorkšs completed his move to Loftus Road for a fee of £250,000, with Daniel Nardiello (permanent) and Zesh Rehman (loan) going the other way as part of the deal. He scored his first goal on 7 November 2009 in their 2–1 away win against Sheffield Wednesday.

In September 2010, he signed a two-year extension with the club.

=== Reading ===
On 24 August 2011, Gorkšs signed for Reading on a three-year contract. In his first season with the club he made 42 appearances in all competitions, scoring three goals and helping Reading win the 2011–12 Football League Championship. This was the second time he had won the trophy having won it the previous year with QPR. He scored his first goal in the Premier League on 4 November 2012 in a 1–1 draw against his former side QPR.

On 12 February 2013, Gorkšs joined Championship club Wolverhampton Wanderers on an emergency loan that ran until the end of the season, with a view to a permanent move at its conclusion. He made fifteen appearances for the club as they suffered relegation to League One.

Gorkšs was released by Reading at the end of the 2013–14 season having played 87 games for the club, scoring eight times.

=== Colchester United ===
Gorkšs signed a short-term contract with League One club Colchester United during the first week of December 2014, and went straight in to their first-team squad to face Peterborough United in the second round of the FA Cup on 7 December. He made an important block from an Aaron McLean attempt in the fixture, playing the full 90 minutes as the U's came out 1–0 victors and into the third round of the cup. Gorkšs signed an extension to his short-term deal with the U's on 10 January, following doubt that he would remain with the club following his previous contracts expiry.

Gorkšs scored his first goal for Colchester on 24 January in a crunch relegation battle game against Leyton Orient at the Colchester Community Stadium. He headed the ball home from a David Fox corner two minutes after the interval in the 2–0 victory.

=== Ergotelis ===
On 29 January 2015, Gorkšs signed an 18-month contract with the Super League Greece club Ergotelis. Gorkšs scored his first goal for Ergotelis in his second match for the club, securing a 3–2 victory in the Cretan derby over OFI.

=== Dukla ===
Gorkšs joined Czech First League side FK Dukla Prague in September 2015, signing a one-year contract.

== International career ==
Gorkšs has played for the Latvian Under-21 team and he made his debut for Latvia on 24 December 2005 against Thailand in the 36th annual King's Cup in Phang Nga, Thailand. On 11 October 2006, in a Euro 2008 qualifier against Northern Ireland, Gorkšs started the second half in place of Māris Smirnovs. In February 2007 he played for Latvia in the annual Cyprus International Football Tournament. On 6 February, he played the full 90 minutes of Latvia's 2–0 defeat by Bulgaria in the semi-finals of the tournament. The following day he played in the third place play-off match against Hungary which they also lost 2–0. On 28 March 2007, Gorkšs played for Latvia in their 2008 UEFA European Football Championship qualifier 1–0 defeat by Liechtenstein. On 22 August 2007, Gorkšs played for Latvia in their friendly 2–1 defeat in Riga by Moldova. He scored his first goal for Latvia on 17 October 2007, against Denmark.

Gorkšs announced his retirement from the Latvia national football team on 31 October 2017.

== Personal life ==
Gorkšs has two children. His first child, a daughter Luīze, was born in 2005 and his son, Patriks, was born in Riga on 16 October 2007. His two brothers, Jorens Gorkšs and Rihards Gorkšs, both play for his former club FK Auda, whilst his father, Juris Gorkšs, is the club's chairman. In July 2012 Gorkšs opened a restaurant Koya, located in the Andrejsala district, Riga, Latvia.

== Career statistics ==
=== Club ===
Appearances and goals by club, season and competition
Club	Season	League			Cup		League Cup		Continental		Total	
Club	Season	Division	Apps	Goals	Apps	Goals	Apps	Goals	Apps	Goals	Apps	Goals
FK Auda	1997	Latvian Second League	?	?	?	?	—		—		?	?
FK Auda	1998	Latvian First League	?	?	?	?	—		—		?	?
FK Auda	1999	Latvian First League	21	4	?	?	—		—		21	4
FK Auda	2000	Latvian First League	28	5	?	?	—		—		28	5
FK Auda	2001	Latvian First League	0	0	?	?	—		—		0	0
FK Auda	2002	Latvian Higher League	28	0	?	?	—		—		28	0
FK Auda	Total		77	9	?	?	—		—		77	9
Öster	2003	Allsvenskan	8	0	?	?	—		—		8	0
Öster	2004	Superettan	24	1	?	?	—		4 (Note: Appearances in the UEFA Cup)	0	28	1
Öster	Total		32	1	?	?	—		4	0	36	1
Assyriska Föreningen	2005	Allsvenskan	23	0	?	?	—		—		23	0
FK Ventspils	2005	Latvian Higher League	28	5	?	?	—		2	0	30	5
Blackpool	2006–07	League One	10	0	3	0	0	0	0	0	13	0
Blackpool	2007–08	Championship	40	6	0	0	4	2	—		44	8
Blackpool	Total		50	6	3	0	4	2	0	0	57	8
Queens Park Rangers	2008–09	Championship	31	0	2	0	2	0	—		35	0
Queens Park Rangers	2009–10	Championship	41	3	2	0	3	0	—		46	3
Queens Park Rangers	2010–11	Championship	42	3	1	0	0	0	—		43	3
Queens Park Rangers	Total		114	6	5	0	5	0	—		124	6
Reading	2011–12	Championship	42	3	1	0	0	0	—		43	3
Reading	2012–13	Premier League	14	1	0	0	3	1	—		17	2
Reading	2013–14	Championship	25	3	1	0	1	0	—		27	3
Reading	Total		81	7	2	0	4	1	—		87	8
Wolves (loan)	2012–13	Championship	15	0	0	0	0	0	—		15	0
Colchester United	2013–14	League One	7	1	2	0	0	0	—		9	1
Ergotelis	2014–15	Super League Greece	13	2	0	0	0	0	—		13	2
Dukla Prague	2015–16	Czech First League	23	3	1	0	—		—		24	3
Liepāja	2016	Latvian Higher League	13	0	0	0	—		2 (Note: Appearances in the UEFA Champions League qualification)	0	15	0
Riga	2017	Latvian Higher League	20	3	7	1	—		—		27	4
FK Auda	2018	Latvian First League	1	0	?	?	—		—		1	0
Career total			497	43	20	1	13	3	8	0	538	47

=== International ===
Appearances and goals by national team and year
National team	Year	Apps	Goals
Latvia	2005	1	0
Latvia	2006	2	0
Latvia	2007	10	1
Latvia	2008	8	0
Latvia	2009	7	1
Latvia	2010	6	1
Latvia	2011	6	1
Latvia	2012	6	1
Latvia	2013	10	0
Latvia	2014	8	0
Latvia	2015	7	0
Latvia	2016	8	0
Latvia	2017	7	0
Total		86	5

Scores and results list Latvia's goal tally first, score column indicates score after each Gorkšs goal.

List of international goals scored by Kaspars Gorkšs
No.	Date	Venue	Opponent	Score	Result	Competition
1	17 October 2007	Parken Stadium, Copenhagen, Denmark	Denmark	1–2	1–3	UEFA Euro 2008 qualification
2	9 September 2009	Ramat Gan Stadium, Ramat Gan, Israel	Israel	1–0	1–0	2010 FIFA World Cup qualification
3	7 September 2010	Ta' Qali National Stadium, Ta' Qali, Malta	Malta	1–0	2–0	UEFA Euro 2012 qualification
4	26 March 2011	Bloomfield Stadium, Tel Aviv, Israel	Israel	1–1	1–2	UEFA Euro 2012 qualification
5	11 September 2012	Bilino Polje Stadium, Zenica, Bosnia and Herzegovina	Bosnia and Herzegovina	1–0	1–4	2014 FIFA World Cup qualification

== Honours ==
Ventspils

- Latvian Higher League: 2006

Queens Park Rangers

- Football League Championship: 2010–11

Reading

- Football League Championship: 2011–12

Individual

- Latvian Footballer of the Year: 2009, 2010
