= Fitz Hall =

English footballer and agent

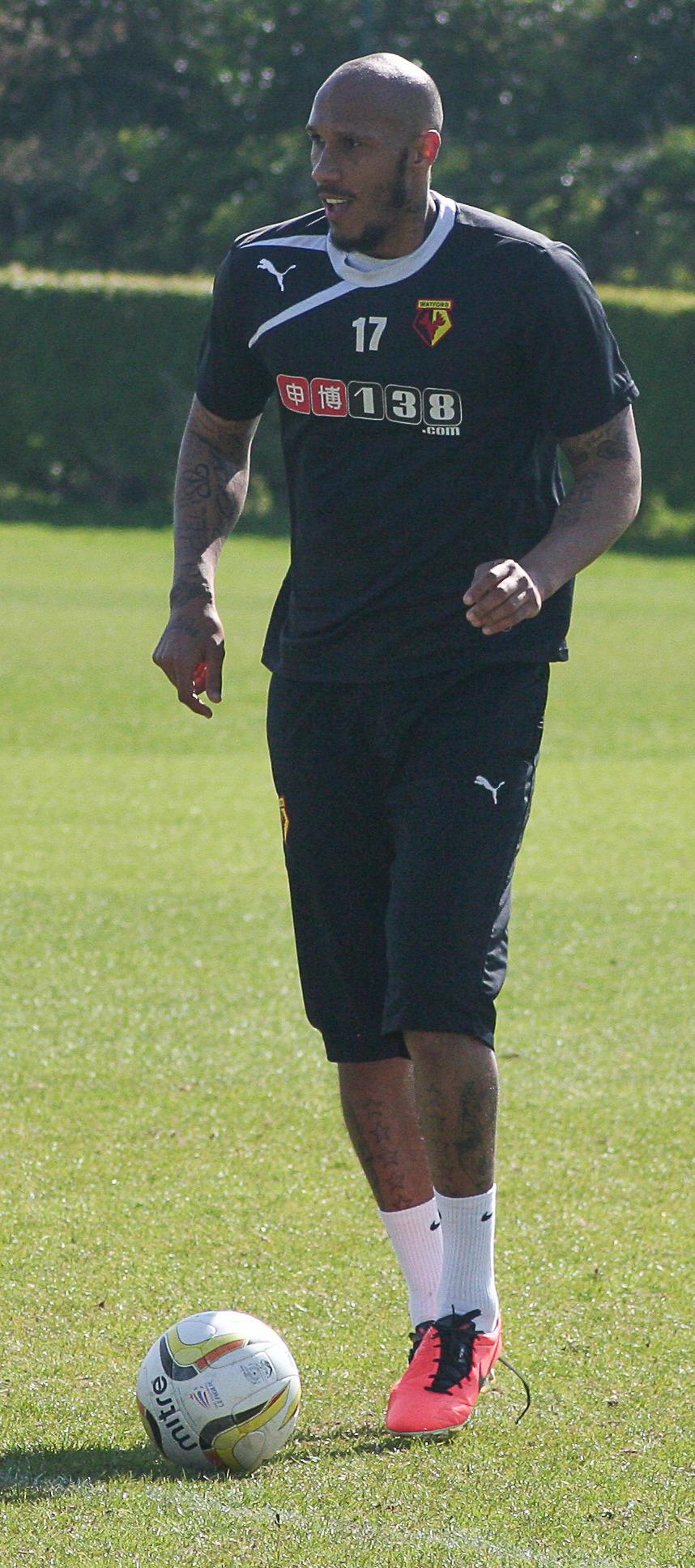
- Hall training with Watford in 2014.

Personal information
- Full name: Fitz Benjamin Hall
- Date of birth: 20 December 1980 (age 45)
- Place of birth: Leytonstone, England
- Height: 6 ft 4 in (1.93 m)
- Positions: Defender; striker

Youth career
- Senrab
- 1997–2000: West Ham United

Senior career*
Years	Team	Apps	(Gls)
2000–2001	Barnet	0	(0)
2001–2002	Chesham United	21	(2)
2002–2003	Oldham Athletic	41	(4)
2003–2004	Southampton	11	(0)
2004–2006	Crystal Palace	75	(3)
2006–2008	Wigan Athletic	25	(0)
2008–2012	Queens Park Rangers	85	(3)
2010	→ Newcastle United (loan)	7	(0)
2012–2013	Watford	21	(1)
2013	Watford	2	(0)
2014	Watford	3	(0)
Total		291	(13)
- * Club domestic league appearances and goals

Fitz Benjamin Hall (born 20 December 1980) is an English former professional footballer and current football agent. He played as a defender during his professional career.

== Club career ==
=== Early career ===
Hall began his career as a West Ham United youth player on the same day as Paul Konchesky, Bobby Zamora, and Jlloyd Samuel but was released at the age of 15. He played for Senrab in Wanstead Flats. Hall was once told that he wasn't good enough to become a professional footballer but found his lucky break through a friend who got him a trial at Barnet. Hall then joined Barnet as part of a Youth Training Scheme before moving to non-league Chesham United under the management of Bob Dowie. It was there that he signed his first professional contract at the age of 21. During his time at Chesham United, Dowie converted him from playing as a striker to a central defender, a position he played throughout his professional career. Hall quickly became a first-team regular for the club, making twenty-one appearances and scoring twice in all competitions.

=== Oldham Athletic ===
Hall's performances at Chesham caught the attention of Iain Dowie, the manager of Oldham Athletic and brother of Bob Dowie. Iain signed Hall for £30,000 during the 2001–02 season on a two-year contract with the club. He made his debut for Oldham, playing the full match in a 2–1 loss against Wycombe Wanderers on 13 April 2002. This turned out to be his only appearance of the season.

The 2002–03 season saw Hall emerge as a key player, becoming a regular in the first team defence. He helped the club keep four clean sheets in four matches between 13 August 2002 and 26 August 2002, despite being sent off in a 0–0 draw against Brentford on 17 August 2002. His performances earned praise from manager Iain Dowie, who noted that Hall was "comfortable on the ball and quick in the tackle." After serving a one-match suspension, Hall returned to the starting line-up for a 3–1 victory against Notts County on 7 September 2002.

Once again, Hall played a crucial role in helping Oldham Athletic keep three clean sheets in the next four matches between 17 September 2002 and 5 October 2002, although he missed a match against Swindon Town. Hall scored his first goal for the club on 2 November 2002 against Stockport County. Two weeks later, on 16 November 2002, he scored his second goal for Oldham in a 2–2 draw against Burton Albion in the first round of the FA Cup. His impressive performances earned him the Player of the Month award for November in the Second Division.

On 21 December 2002, Hall scored his third goal of the season in a 1–0 win against Chesterfield. His next goal came on 14 January 2003 in a 2–1 win against Brentford. Five days later, on 19 January 2003, he signed a new deal to keep him at the club until 2005. However, six days later, on 26 January 2003, Hall received a straight red card in the 28th minute for a foul on Steve Jones in a 3–1 loss. After serving a two-match suspension, he returned to the starting line-up on 22 February 2003, helping Oldham draw 1–1 against Notts County.

He then scored his fifth goal of the season in a 1–0 win against Mansfield Town. Despite being sidelined with a toe injury that caused him to miss two matches, Hall remained a regular in the first team for the rest of the season, as the club reached the play–offs, finishing as runners-up to league champions Wigan Athletic. Hall played in both legs of the play-off semi-final against Queens Park Rangers, which Oldham lost 2–1 on aggregate. By the end of the 2002–03 season, Hall had made fifty appearances and scored five goals in all competitions. His performances earned him a place in the PFA Team of the Year.

However, the club experienced a financial meltdown, casting doubt on Hall's future. Reports suggested that he could become a free agent by exercising his rights if he didn't receive his salary on time. On 3 July 2003, Hall, along with teammates Will Haining and Les Pogliacomi, informed Oldham Athletic that they were threatening to leave the club after not being paid the previous month. This situation attracted interest from British clubs, including Everton, Cardiff City, and Bolton Wanderers, who expressed an interest in signing Hall. Following his departure, manager Iain Dowie accused Oldham Athletic's owner, Chris Moore, of "ripping the heart out of the club" by selling key players, including Hall.

=== Southampton ===
Hall was sold to the Premier League side Southampton for a transfer fee between £250,000 and £350,000.

He made his debut for the club in a 4–0 loss against Jönköpings Södra in a friendly match on 24 July 2003, playing the entire game. Hall participated in several friendly matches during the club's pre-season tour. However, he struggled to break into Southampton's first team regularly due to competition and injury concerns. As a result, Hall had to wait until 16 December 2003 to make his competitive debut for the club, starting in a 1–0 loss against Bolton Wanderers in the League Cup quarter-finals. He made his Premier League debut on 29 December 2003, playing the full match in a 1–0 loss against Arsenal. In his second Premier League appearance, against Birmingham City on 10 January 2004, Hall unfortunately scored an own goal, leading to a 2–1 defeat for Southampton. By April, he had managed to secure a few first-team appearances for the remainder of the 2003–04 season. By the end of the season, Hall had made 12 first-team appearances in all competitions.

=== Crystal Palace ===
Due to his lack of first-team opportunities, Hall was linked with a move to newly promoted Premier League club Crystal Palace, where his former manager, Iain Dowie, was in charge and made a bid for him in late July. He joined Crystal Palace at the beginning of the 2004–05 season for a reported transfer fee of £1.5 million.

Hall made his debut for Crystal Palace in the opening game of the season, starting in a midfield position and playing 78 minutes before being substituted in a 1–1 draw against Norwich City. From then on, he became a regular in the first team during the club's first season back in the Premier League, often playing in the midfield position. At times, Hall also rotated into the centre-back position.

He scored his first goal for Crystal Palace with a header in a 3–0 win against West Bromwich Albion on 23 October 2004. However, he suffered a knee injury that sidelined him for two matches. He returned to the starting line-up on 20 November 2004, playing in the centre-back position in a 2–0 loss against Newcastle United. Upon his return from injury, Hall regained his place in the first team, forming a solid centre-back partnership with Gonzalo Sorondo.

He then scored his second goal for the club with what was described as an "unstoppable 20-yard shot" in a 2–2 draw against his former club, Southampton, as Crystal Palace fought to avoid relegation. In the final game of the season against local rivals Charlton Athletic, Hall played the full match and delivered an impressive performance, but the 2–2 draw wasn't enough to save the club from relegation, as they needed a win to stay up.

Despite dealing with injuries during the 2004–05 season, Hall made 37 appearances and scored twice in all competitions. A review of the season by Your Local Guardian praised Hall as the best signing for Crystal Palace that season.

At the start of the 2005–06 season, Hall was appointed team captain of Crystal Palace, replacing Michael Hughes following the club's relegation to the Championship. He helped the club keep three consecutive clean sheets between 20 August 2005 and 10 September 2005. Despite serving a suspension for accumulating five yellow cards during the season, Hall continued to start eleven matches in the centre-back position, forming a partnership with Darren Ward.

This partnership lasted until he missed a match due to a knock sustained during a 1–1 draw against Millwall on 3 December 2005, in which he was substituted in the 59th minute. Midway through the season, many Crystal Palace fans felt that Hall's performance was being affected by the burden of captaincy. After several poor performances and additional yellow cards, Hughes was re-appointed team captain in January 2006.

Despite losing the captaincy, Hall remained in the first team until the end of the season, occasionally playing in a full-back position. During a 1–0 win against Cardiff City on 4 February 2006, Hall received a straight red card for an off-the-ball incident involving Joe Ledley and served a three-match suspension. After serving this suspension, he returned to the starting line-up for a 1–1 draw against Millwall on 18 February 2006 and subsequently scored his second goal of the season in a 4–1 win against Norwich City.

After missing two matches due to another injury, Hall contributed to the club's placement in the Championship play-offs. He played in both legs of the play-off semi-final against Watford, as Crystal Palace lost 3–0. By the end of the 2005–06 season, Hall had made 44 appearances and scored once in all competitions.

=== Wigan Athletic ===
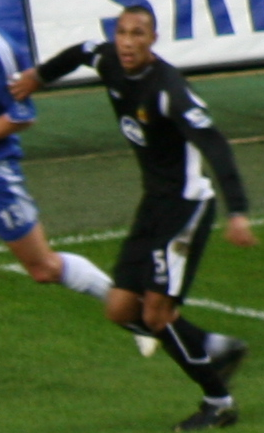
Hall playing for Wigan Athletic in 2007.

Hall moved from Crystal Palace to Premier League side Wigan Athletic for an undisclosed fee on 26 June 2006. New Palace boss Peter Taylor cited a £3 million get-out clause in Hall's contract as the reason for the transfer. Hall later mentioned that Dowie's departure was also a factor in his decision to move on.

Hall made his debut for Wigan Athletic, playing the full match in a 2–1 loss against Newcastle United in the opening game of the season. He then started the next five matches in the centre-back position, forming a partnership with Arjan de Zeeuw. This run was interrupted when Hall suffered a virus, causing him to miss one match. After returning to the starting line-up against Manchester United on 14 October 2006, Hall's return was short-lived. In a match against Manchester City on 21 October 2006, he suffered ankle ligament damage following a challenge from Dietmar Hamann and was substituted at half-time, as Wigan Athletic won 4–0. Initially expected to be out for three weeks, Hall was eventually sidelined for five weeks.

He made his return to the first team on 26 November 2006, coming on as a 67th-minute substitute in a 3–1 loss against Tottenham Hotspur. Hall regained his place in the first team, playing alongside de Zeeuw for the next eleven matches. In a game against Arsenal on 11 February 2007, with Wigan leading 1–0, Hall scored an own goal in the 81st minute to level the score at 1–1. Four minutes later, Tomáš Rosický scored the winner for Arsenal.

In a subsequent match against Watford on 21 February 2007, Hall received a straight red card for a challenge on Johan Cavalli in a 1–1 draw. Wigan Athletic's appeal against Hall's sending-off was unsuccessful, and he served a three-match ban. After serving this suspension, Hall returned to the starting line-up against Charlton Athletic on 31 March 2007. He was at fault for conceding a penalty following a foul on Marcus Bent, which Darren Bent converted to score the only goal of the match.

Hall started the next two matches before suffering a knee injury during a game against Aston Villa on 9 April 2007. He was substituted in the 52nd minute as the match ended 1–1. After undergoing surgery, it was announced that he would be out for the rest of the 2006–07 season. By the end of the season, Hall had made twenty-six appearances in all competitions. Reflecting on his season, the local newspaper Manchester Evening News commented: "Very poor and never looked like living up to his price tag. He never really got to grips with the job and missed far too many games."

In the 2007–08 season, Hall's first-team opportunities were limited due to falling out with both Chris Hutchings and then-manager Steve Bruce. As a result, he made only two appearances for the club. Championship clubs were reported to be tracking him, and Hall eventually signed for Queens Park Rangers.

=== Queens Park Rangers ===
Hall was one of several players signed by Championship side Queens Park Rangers during the early part of the January 2008 transfer window. He signed a four-and-a-half-year contract after the club paid an undisclosed fee.

Hall made his debut for Queens Park Rangers, playing the full match in a 1–0 loss against Chelsea in the third round of the FA Cup. However, during a 3–1 loss against Cardiff City on 30 January 2008, he suffered a groin injury and was substituted in the 38th minute.

After being sidelined for several weeks, Hall returned to the starting line-up against Sheffield United on 23 February 2008, playing the entire game in a 1–1 draw. He then helped Queens Park Rangers keep three clean sheets in the next three matches between 26 February 2008 and 5 March 2008. Following another groin injury that caused him to miss one match, Hall returned to the starting line-up against Blackpool on 11 March 2008 and played the full game, contributing to a 3–2 victory.

Hall started the next six matches before suffering another injury, which led to his substitution in the 34th minute of a 1–0 win against Charlton Athletic on 19 April 2008. By the end of the 2007–08 season, Hall had made fifteen appearances in all competitions.

Hall scored his first Queens Park Rangers goal in the opening game of the 2008–09 season against Barnsley, adding a second just two minutes later. He also had a penalty saved that would have given him a hat-trick, with Queens Park Rangers winning 2–1. However, he suffered a groin injury that sidelined him for a month.

Hall did not return to the first team until a match against Derby County on 27 September 2008, where he played the full game in a 2–0 loss. He then helped the club keep three clean sheets in matches between 21 October 2008 and 28 October 2008. Despite facing competition from centre-backs Kaspars Gorkšs and Damion Stewart, Hall remained involved in the first team, though he was occasionally placed on the substitute bench.

In a match against Watford on 22 November 2008, Hall received a straight red card in the 81st minute for a foul on Will Hoskins, contributing to a 3–0 loss. After serving a three-match suspension, he returned to the starting line-up as a late substitute in a 1–0 loss against Sheffield Wednesday on 9 December 2008.

By the end of the 2008–09 season, Hall had made twenty-seven appearances and scored twice in all competitions.

At the start of the 2009–10 season, Hall started in the first five league matches, forming a centre-back partnership with Peter Ramage and Damion Stewart. However, he suffered an injury that sidelined him for a month. Hall did not return to the first team until 30 October 2009, when he came on as a 54th-minute substitute in a 2–1 loss against Leicester City.

After his return, Hall found himself in and out of the starting line-up for the remainder of the first half of the season and also dealt with a back injury. By the time he departed from the club, he had made fourteen appearances in all competitions.

After his loan spell at Newcastle United ended, Hall stayed at Queens Park Rangers for the 2010–11 season following discussions about his future at the club. Shortly thereafter, he was appointed as the new captain of Queens Park Rangers. Hall made his first appearance since returning from Newcastle United in the opening game of the season against Barnsley, where he scored his first goal of the season in a 4–0 win.

However, he suffered a hamstring injury during a 3–0 win against Sheffield United on 14 August 2010 and was substituted in the 50th minute. It was announced after the match that Hall would be sidelined for a month, but he returned in mid-October, only to be injured again by the end of the month. Hall made his first-team return on 20 November 2010 against Preston North End, starting and playing 81 minutes in a 3–1 win.

Following his return from injury, Hall continued to find himself in and out of the first team and faced further injury problems for the rest of the 2010–11 season. In a match against Watford on 30 April 2011, he started and played 23 minutes before being substituted due to injury, as the club won 2–0 to secure promotion to the Premier League. By the end of the 2010–11 season, Hall had made twenty appearances and scored once in all competitions.

Ahead of the 2011–12 season, Hall was informed by the club's management that he was no longer wanted in the first team. Despite this, he remained at Queens Park Rangers and became a regular starter, rotating in a centre-back partnership with Danny Gabbidon, Anton Ferdinand, and Bruno Perone.

In a match against rivals Fulham on 5 October 2011, he suffered a hamstring injury but played the full game as the club lost 6–0. After the match, Hall apologised for both his own and the team's performance via his Twitter account. He suffered another hamstring injury and was substituted in the 9th minute of a 3–1 loss against Tottenham Hotspur on 30 October 2011. After being sidelined for a month, Hall returned to the first team as an 80th-minute substitute in a 3–2 loss against Sunderland on 21 December 2011.

His return was short-lived, as he suffered a groin injury that kept him out for a week. Hall returned to the starting line-up for a third-round FA Cup match against Milton Keynes Dons on 7 January 2012, playing the full game in a 1–1 draw. However, after Neil Warnock was replaced as manager by Mark Hughes and the arrival of Nedum Onuoha, Hall fell down the pecking order. At the end of the 2011–12 season, he was one of eight players released by the club.

==== Newcastle United (loan) ====
On 29 January 2010, Hall was signed on loan by Newcastle United for the remainder of the season. The club had attempted to sign him earlier in the 2009–10 season, but the move did not materialize at that time.

He made his debut for Newcastle United in a 5–1 win over Cardiff City at St James' Park, delivering a solid performance before being replaced by Tamás Kádár in the closing stages of the game. After his debut, Hall found himself in and out of the first team due to competition in the defense. During Newcastle United's 2–2 draw with Bristol City at Ashton Gate Stadium on 20 March 2010, Hall injured his hamstring while chasing Nicky Maynard and was substituted as a result. After the game, manager Chris Hughton expressed concern, saying the injury "did not look too good." Despite this assessment, Hall recovered in time to play in the match that confirmed Newcastle United as Football League Championship champions on 19 April 2010. His contributions earned praise from Hughton, who said, "I am delighted with Fitz. When you go somewhere on loan, the one thing you want and need to do is play. He has been able to do that with us, but it has also been very frustrating for him to miss out. I felt for him when he was injured, but he has done very well for us when he has played." However, his return was short-lived, and Hall did not play for the remainder of the 2009–10 season. By the end of the season, he had made seven appearances in all competitions.

Following Newcastle's promotion to the Premier League, Hall was eager to secure a permanent move, but the deal did not materialize, and he returned to his parent club.

=== Watford ===
In July 2012, Hall signed a one-year contract with Watford, joining the club along with seven other new signings. Upon his arrival, he was assigned the number six shirt.

Hall faced a setback when he wasn't featured in any of Watford's pre-season games due to a lack of fitness, which sidelined him for a month. He finally made his debut for the club as a 69th-minute substitute in a 2–2 draw against Bristol City on 22 September 2012. He followed this up by scoring his first goal for Watford in a 3–2 win over Huddersfield Town. Hall then started the next six matches, forming a center-back partnership with Neuton and Tommie Hoban. However, his progress was interrupted by a hamstring injury that kept him out for several weeks.

Hall returned from injury on 24 November 2012, starting in a 2–2 draw against Blackpool. He continued in the starting lineup for the next six matches until he suffered another hamstring injury during a 3–1 win against Brighton & Hove Albion on 29 December 2012, which sidelined him again. Hall made his comeback as a 70th-minute substitute in a 1–0 win against Nottingham Forest on 26 January 2013 and started the following three matches before suffering yet another hamstring injury, sidelining him for a month.

On 29 March 2013, Hall returned to the starting lineup in a 3–3 draw against Burnley. However, his return was short-lived as he suffered another hamstring injury in the following match against Hull City, which caused him to miss the remainder of the season as Watford finished third in the league. During the Championship play-offs, he made one appearance in the semi-final first leg against Leicester City, but Watford ultimately lost the play-off final against Crystal Palace.

At the end of the 2012–13 season, Hall had made 22 appearances and scored one goal in all competitions. His future at Watford became uncertain as he had not been offered a new contract, and by 1 July 2013, he became a free agent when his contract expired.

On 22 November 2013, Hall rejoined Watford on a one-month deal after having trained with the club for several months. He made one start and one substitute appearance before his contract expired. Despite this, he was allowed to continue training with Watford under new head coach Giuseppe Sannino.

On 6 January 2014, Hall joined Watford for a third time after agreeing to a new short-term deal. He made four more appearances for the club since rejoining earlier that month. His contract was later extended until the end of the season. However, Hall suffered an Achilles injury that sidelined him for a month. Despite recovering and maintaining his fitness by early April, he remained on the sidelines for the rest of the 2013–14 season. At the end of the season, Hall had made six appearances in all competitions.

Along with Lucas Neill and Albert Riera, who were also on short-term contracts, it was confirmed on 4 June that Hall would be departing Vicarage Road at the end of his contract.

=== Amateur football ===
After leaving Watford, Hall signed with Sunday League side Percival, based in Waltham Abbey. Playing as a striker, Hall scored a hat-trick on his debut as Percival defeated Enfield Rangers 8–0 in their Premier Division fixture. He went on to score nine times in 14 league matches throughout the season.

== Outside football ==
After retiring from professional football, Hall became a football consultant for the Base Soccer Agency.

== International career ==
In April 2004, during his time at Southampton, Hall received an unexpected call-up to the Scotland national team through his grandmother. However, Hall denied any discussions about a possible call-up, stating he had heard nothing from manager Berti Vogts. Hall later said: "Every kid growing up wants to play for their country, but I'm not going to set myself any targets because I don't want to be left disappointed if that doesn't happen. At the moment, I am concentrating on getting myself established in a Premiership team. I spoke to Vogts when I was at Southampton, but I was born in England and I see myself as English. That's not snubbing Scotland, but I just want to focus on playing in the Premiership."

Hall is also eligible to play for Barbados and was called up to the Caribbean national team in 2011. In 2015, he stated that he would like to play for Barbados and would return to professional football if called up.

== Personal life ==
In October 2004, Hall became a father for the first time. Throughout his career, he earned the nickname "One Size," which led him to launch a clothing line named after it.

Growing up, he supported Arsenal.

== Honours ==
Queens Park Rangers

- Football League Championship: 2010–11

Individual

- PFA Team of the Year: 2002–03 Second Division

Sporting positions
Preceded by Michael Hughes	Crystal Palace captain 2005-2006	Succeeded by Michael Hughes
