= Alessandro Pellicori =

Italian footballer and coach (born 1981)

Personal information
- Date of birth: 22 July 1981 (age 45)
- Place of birth: Cosenza, Italy
- Height: 1.81 m (5 ft 11 in)
- Position: Striker

Senior career*
Years	Team	Apps	(Gls)
1999–2000	Cosenza	1	(0)
2000–2004	Lecce	4	(0)
2002	→ Avellino (loan)	18	(7)
2003	→ Varese (loan)	9	(1)
2003	→ Foggia (loan)	15	(2)
2004	→ Benevento (loan)	14	(1)
2004–2005	Grosseto	53	(22)
2006	Catanzaro	7	(0)
2006	Piacenza	9	(0)
2007	Cesena	12	(3)
2007–2009	Avellino	38	(18)
2009	→ Grosseto (loan)	19	(4)
2009–2011	Queens Park Rangers	8	(0)
2010	→ Mantova (loan)	17	(8)
2010–2011	→ Torino (loan)	22	(1)
2016	Castrovillari	2	(0)
2016–2017	Acri	?	(?)

Managerial career
- 2017–2018: Palmese
- * Club domestic league appearances and goals

Alessandro Pellicori (born 22 July 1981) is a former Italian footballer and football coach. He played as a striker.

On 11 August 2012 he was suspended for 3 years for alleged match-fixing.

== Career ==
Pellicori started his professional career at Cosenza then Lecce. He made his Serie A debut on 14 January 2001 against Vicenza. Lecce loaned him to various Serie C1 clubs until he settled in Grosseto.

Pellicori signed for Piacenza of Serie B in summer 2006, but he was signed by Serie B rival Cesena on 31 January 2007. On 22 August, he moved to newly promoted Serie B team Avellino. He scored 18 goals, but the team finished as the top of the four relegated teams. On 29 July 2009 Queens Park Rangers signed Pellicori on a free transfer until June 2012. He scored his first goal for QPR in a first round League Cup tie at Exeter City on 11 August 2009. However, he failed to score in the league and joined Mantova on loan in January 2010. In August 2010, he penned a season long loan deal at Torino.
