= 2002–03 Queens Park Rangers F.C. season =

English football club season

Queens Park Rangers
2002–2003 season
- Manager: Ian Holloway
- Stadium: Loftus Road
- Second Division: 4th
- FA Cup: First round
- League Cup: First round
- League Trophy: First Round
- Playoffs: Final
- Top goalscorer: League: All: Kevin Gallen (17)
- Highest home attendance: 17,201 14 May 2003 Oldham Athletic
- Lowest home attendance: 4,722 22 October 2002 Bristol City
- Average home league attendance: 13,206
- Biggest win: 4–0 Vs Mansfield Town (7 September 2002), Port Vale (15 February 2003)
- Biggest defeat: 0–4 Vs Cardiff City (29 November 2002)
Home colours	Away colours	Third colours

During the 2002–2003 English football season, Queens Park Rangers F.C. competed in the Football League Second Division.

== Season summary ==
QPR led the league for a week in September but never regained the top spot again as only 2 subsequent wins in 2002 meant they only qualified for the playoffs.

in the playoffs QPR were defeated at the Millennium Stadium by Cardiff City

In the FA Cup, QPR were knocked out of the FA cup by Vauxhall Motors.

== Kit ==
Le Coq Sportif continued as QPR's kit manufacturers. Retailer JD Sports continued as kit sponsors.

== Final league table ==
Pos	Team	Pld	W	D	L	GF	GA	GD	Pts	Promotion or relegation
2	Crewe Alexandra (P)	46	25	11	10	76	40	+36	86	Promotion to Football League First Division
3	Bristol City	46	24	11	11	79	48	+31	83	Qualification for the Second Division play-offs
4	Queens Park Rangers	46	24	11	11	69	45	+24	83	Qualification for the Second Division play-offs
5	Oldham Athletic	46	22	16	8	68	38	+30	82	Qualification for the Second Division play-offs
6	Cardiff City (O, P)	46	23	12	11	68	43	+25	81	Qualification for the Second Division play-offs

Rules for classification: In the Football League goals scored (GF) takes precedence over goal difference (GD).
(O) Play-off winners; (P) Promoted

== Results ==
=== Legend ===
Win	Draw	Loss

Date	Opponents	Venue	Result F–A	Position	Scorers	Attendance
10 August 2002	Chesterfield	H	3–1	2	Furlong 72', Langley 88', Gallen 90'	12,603
13 August 2002	Stockport County	A	1–1	7	Connolly 71'(pen)	5,811
17 August 2002	Barnsley	A	0–1	10		9,626
24 August 2002	Peterborough United	H	2–0	6	Gallen 59', 70'	11,510
26 August 2002	Wycombe Wanderers	A	1–4	13	Furlong	8,383
31 August 2002	Plymouth Argyle	H	2–2	13	Thomas 69', Pacquette 90'	14,001
7 September 2002	Mansfield Town	A	4–0	7	Furlong 6', Shittu 48', Gallen 85', Thomson 89'	4,581
14 September 2002	Swindon Town	H	2–0	6	Gallen 50', Langley 56'	11,619
17 September 2002	Huddersfield Town	H	3–0	2	Shittu 4', Williams 32, Carlisle 73'	11,010
21 September 2002	Bristol City	A	3–1	1	Connolly 23',48', Gallen 53'	12,221
28 September 2002	Colchester United	H	2–0	2	Connolly 39', Gallen 72'	12,906
5 October 2002	Crewe Alexandra	A	0–2	5		7,683
14 October 2002	Blackpool	H	2–1	4	Langley 18', Clarke 66' (og)	11,335
19 October 2002	Cheltenham Town	A	1–1	5	Thomas	6,382
26 October 2002	Oldham Athletic	H	1–2	6	Rose	15,491
29 October 2002	Wigan Athletic	A	1–1	5	Thomson	6,241
2 November 2002	Port Vale	A	0–0	5		4,394
9 November 2002	Northampton Town	H	0–1	6		11,947
23 November 2002	Luton Town	A	0–0	6		9,477
29 November 2002	Cardiff City	H	0–4	6		14,345
14 December 2002	Notts County	A	0–3	7		5,343
21 December 2002	Brentford	H	1–1	7	Bircham	15,559
26 December 2002	Wycombe Wanderers	H	2–1	7	Rose, Gallen	14,874
28 December 2002	Tranmere Rovers	A	0–3	10		8,434
1 January 2003	Peterborough United	A	2–0	7	Carlisle, Langley	6,210
4 January 2003	Stockport County	H	1–0	6	Gallen (pen)	10,387
11 January 2003	Barnsley	H	1–0	6	Pacquette	11,217
18 January 2003	Plymouth Argyle	A	1–0	6	Pacquette	10,249
25 January 2003	Tranmere Rovers	H	1–2	6	Palmer	12,249
2 February 2003	Chesterfield	A	4–2	6	Pacquette, Shittu, Furlong, Thomson	4,395
8 February 2003	Northampton Town	A	1–1	6	Furlong	5,859
15 February 2003	Port Vale	H	4–0	6	Shittu, Furlong, Padula, Gallen	13,703
22 February 2003	Mansfield Town	H	2–2	6	Furlong, Gallen	11,942
1 March 2003	Swindon Town	A	1–3	6	Shittu 15'	7,716
4 March 2003	Huddersfield Town	A	3–0	6	Furlong 2, Shittu	8,695
8 March 2003	Bristol City	H	1–0	6	Gallen (pen)	14,681
15 March 2003	Oldham Athletic	A	0–0	6		7,245
18 March 2003	Cheltenham Town	H	4–1	6	Gallen, Duff (og), Cook, Furlong	11,370
22 March 2003	Wigan Athletic	H	0–1	6		14,703
29 March 2003	Blackpool	A	3–1	6	Langley 3	8,162
5 April 2003	Cardiff City	A	2–1	6	Furlong, Langley	15,245
12 April 2003	Luton Town	H	2–0	6	McLeod 2	15,786
19 April 2003	Brentford	A	2–1	6	Shittu, Bircham	9,168
21 April 2003	Notts County	H	2–0	5	Furlong, Langley	13,585
26 April 2003	Crewe Alexandra	H	0–0	6		16,921
3 May 2003	Colchester United	A	1–0	4	Furlong	5,047

=== Playoffs ===
Date	Opponent	Venue	Result F–A	Scorers	Attendance
10 May 2003	Oldham	A	1–1	Langley	12,152
14 May 2003	Oldham	H	1–0	Furlong	17,201
25 May 2003	Cardiff	Millenium Stadium	0–1*		66,096

=== FA Cup ===
Date	Round	Opponent	Venue	Result F–A	Scorers	Attendance
16 November 2002	First round	Vauxhall Motors	A	0–0		3,507
26 November 2002	First round (replay)	Vauxhall Motors	H	1–1 (a.e.t.) (3–4 p)	Thomson	5,336

=== Worthington Cup ===
Round	Date	Opponent	Venue	Result F–A	Scorers	Attendance
First round	10 September 2002	Leyton Orient	A	2–3	Thomson, Gallen	4,981

=== Football League Trophy ===
Round	Date	Opponent	Venue	Result F–A	Scorers	Attendance
First round	22 October 2002	Bristol City	H	0–0 (a.e.t.) (4–5 p)		4,722

=== Friendlies ===
Date		Opponents	Venue	Result F–A	Scorers	Attendance
13-Jul-02		Glasgow Celtic	H			
20-Jul-02		Aylesbury United	A			
28-Jul-02		Tottenham Hotspur	H			
3-Aug-02		Steaua Bucharest	H			
14-Oct-02		Arsenal	A			
16-Dec-02		Chelsea	A			
28-Apr-03		Tottenham Hotspur	A			
20 May 2003	Gavin Peacock Testimonial	Chelsea	H			

== Squad ==
Position	Nationality	Name	League Appearances	League Goals	Cup Appearances	Worthington Cup Goals	F.A.Cup Goals	Total Appearances	Total Goals
GK	ENG	Nick Culkin	17					17	
GK	ENG	Chris Day	15					15	
GK	ENG	Simon Royce	16		1			17	
GK	ENG	Fraser Digby	1		3			5	
DF	ENG	Steve Palmer	49	1	4			53	1
DF	ENG	Terrell Forbes	39		3			43	
DF	ENG	Marcus Bean	4					8	
DF	ENG	Matthew Rose	27	2	3			33	2
DF	IRE	Stephen Kelly	9					9	
DF	ENG	Danny Murphy	4					12	
DF	ENG	Chris Plummer						2	
DF	ENG	Clarke Carlisle	36	2	3			41	2
DF	ARG	Gino Padula	19	1	1			25	1
DF	NGA	Danny Shittu	46	7	2			48	7
MF	ENG	Ben Walshe	1					1	
MF	ENG	Wes Daly	3		1			7	
MF	ENG	Tom Williams	23	1	4			32	1
MF	ENG	Jerome Thomas	5	2				6	2
MF	ENG	Oliver Burgess	2		3			8	
MF	ENG	Marc Bircham	37	2	2			41	2
MF	ENG	Kevin McLeod	11	2				11	2
MF	ENG	Richard Langley	38	10	3			42	10
FW	ENG	Karl Connolly	12	4	3			20	4
FW	ENG	Andy Thomson	8	2	4	1	1	25	4
FW	ENG	Paul Furlong	30	14	1			38	14
FW	ENG	Lee Cook	13	1				13	1
FW	ENG	Dennis Oli	8		2			22	
FW	FRA	Aziana Ebele Mbombo	3					13	
FW	ENG	Richard Pacquette	5	4	1			15	4
FW	ENG	Leroy Griffiths	3					6	
FW	ENG	Brett Angell	8					13	
FW	SKN	Callum Willock	3					3	
FW	ENG	Kevin Gallen	44	13		1		47	14

== Transfers Out ==
Name	from	Date	Fee	Date	Club	Fee
Junior Agogo	San Jose Earthquakes	28 Mar 2002		July 2002	Barnet	
Mark Perry	Queens Park Rangers Juniors	October 1995		July 2002	Retired (injury)	
Alexandre Bonnot	Watford	August 2001	Free	July 2002	Retired	
Paul Bruce	Queens Park Rangers Juniors	15 July 1996		2 July	Dagenham & Redbr.	Free
Gavin Peacock	Chelsea	21 Nov 1996	£800,000	2 July	Retired	
Christer Warren	Bournemouth	15 June 2000	Free	September 2002	Bristol Rovers	Free
Marcus Bignot	Bristol R	16 Mar 2001	£25,000	2 July	Rushden & Diamond	Free
Ryan D'Austin	Queens Park Rangers Juniors	June2001		2 July		Free
Hamid Barr	Fisher Athletic	13 July 2001	Free	2 July	St.Albans C	Free
Steve Lovell	Portsmouth	6 Aug 2002	Loan	2 Aug	Portsmouth	Loan
Simon Royce	Leicester	23 Aug 2002	Loan	2 Oct	Leicester	Loan
JeromeThomas	Arsenal	28 Aug 2002	Loan	2 Oct	Arsenal	Loan
Simon Royce	Leicester	14 Oct 2002	Loan	2 Nov	Leicester	Loan
Chris Plummer	Queens Park Rangers Juniors	July 1994		November 2002	Bristol Rovers	Loan
Calum Willock	Fulham	7 Nov 2002	Loan	2 Dec	Fulham	Loan
Carl Leaburn	Wimbledon	December 2001		January 2003	Grays Athletic FC	
Fraser Digby	Huddersfield	11 Oct 2001	Free	3 Jan	Purfleet	Free
Richard Brady	Queens Park Rangers Juniors	June2001		3 Mar	Stevenage Borough	Free
Lee Cook	Watford	18 Dec 2002	Loan	3 Mar	Watford	Loan
Stephen Kelly	Tottenham	27 Mar 2003	Loan	3 May	Tottenham	Loan
Kevin McLeod	Everton	20 Mar 2003	Loan	3 May	Everton	Loan
Tommy Williams	Birmingham	4 Aug 2003	Loan	3 May	Birmingham	Loan
Brett Angell	Port Vale	20 Nov 2002	Free	3 June	Retired	Free
Chris Plummer	Queens Park Rangers Juniors	1 July 1994		3 June	Barnet	Free

== Transfers In ==
Name	from	Date	Fee
Gino Padula	Unattached (Arg)	3 July 2002	Free
Nick Culkin	Manchester United	9 July 2002	Free
Marc Bircham	Millwall	5 July 2002	Free
Jerome Thomas	Arsenal	28 Aug 2002	Loan
Simon Royce	Leicester City	23 Aug 2002	Loan
Tommy Williams	Birmingham	8 Aug 2002	Loan
Steve Lovell	Portsmouth	6 Aug 2002	Loan
Paul Furlong	Birmingham	8 Aug 2002	Free
Simon Royce	Leicester	14 Oct 2002	Loan
Brett Angell	Port Vale	November 2002	
Calum Willock	Fulham	7 Nov 2002	Loan
Brett Angell	Port Vale	20 Nov 2002	Free
Lee Cook	Watford	18 Dec 2002	Loan
Kevin McLeod	Everton	20 Mar 2003	Loan
Stephen Kelly	Tottenham	27 Mar 2003	Loan
