= 2001–02 Queens Park Rangers F.C. season =

English football club season

Queens Park Rangers
2001–2002 season
- Manager: Ian Holloway
- Stadium: Loftus Road
- Second Division: 8th
- FA Cup: First round
- League Cup: First round
- League Trophy: First Round
- Top goalscorer: League: Andy Thomson 21; All: Andy Thomson 21
- Highest home attendance: 18,346 13 April 2002 Brentford
- Lowest home attendance: 8,519 26 February 2002 Wigan Athletic
- Average home league attendance: 11,740
- Biggest win: 4–0 Vs Swindon Town (21 November 2001)
- Biggest defeat: 0–4 Vs Swansea City (18 November 2001)
Home colours	Away colours

During the 2001–2002 English football season, Queens Park Rangers F.C. competed in the Football League Second Division.

== Kit ==
Le Coq Sportif continued as QPR's kit manufacturers. Retailer JD Sports became new kit sponsors.

== Final league table ==
Pos	Team	Pld	W	D	L	GF	GA	GD	Pts	Promotion or relegation
6	Huddersfield Town	46	21	15	10	65	47	+18	78	Qualification for the Second Division play-offs
7	Bristol City	46	21	10	15	68	53	+15	73	
8	Queens Park Rangers	46	19	14	13	60	49	+11	71	
9	Oldham Athletic	46	18	16	12	77	65	+12	70	
10	Wigan Athletic	46	16	16	14	66	51	+15	64	

Rules for classification: In the Football League goals scored (GF) takes precedence over goal difference (GD).

== Results ==
=== Legend ===
Win	Draw	Loss

=== Football League Second Division ===
Date	Opponents	Venue	Result F–A	Position	Scorers	Attendance
11 August 2001	Stoke	H	1–0	7	Thomson	14,357
18 August 2001	Bury	A	2–1	4	Thomson (pen), Bruce	4,167
25 August 2001	Reading	H	0–0	5		13,892
27 August 2001	Wycombe	A	0–1	9		9,217
30 August 2001	Bristol C	H	0–0	7		11,655
8 September 2001	Brighton	A	1–2	12	Thomson	10,655
15 September 2001	Port Vale	H	4–1	8	Palmer, Thomson 3 (1 pen)	9,295
18 September 2001	Blackpool		2–2	8	Griffiths 2	5,774
22 September 2001	Wigan	A	2–1	8	Thomson, Brennan (og)	6,686
25 September 2001	Cardiff	H	2–1	4	Thomson 2 (1pen)	11,667
29 September 2001	Cambridge U	A	1–2	7	Connolly	4,508
7 October 2001	Huddersfield	H	3–2	5	Thomson, Rose, Palmer	10,668
13 October 2001	Wrexham	A	0–1	6		4,474
20 October 2001	Northampton	H	0–1	10		10,444
23 October 2001	Peterborough	A	1–4	12	Palmer	7,427
27 October 2001	Oldham	H	1–1	13	M'Bombo	10,556
3 November 2001	Notts County	A	2–0	9	Thomson 2	6,231
10 November 2001	Tranmere	H	1–2	14	Thomson	9,024
21 November 2001	Swindon	H	4–0	9	Doudou 2', Burgess 7', Gallen 36', Thomson 90'	8,847
24 November 2001	Brentford	A	0–0	11		10,849
1 December 2001	Colchester	H	2–2	10	Gallen 2	11,158
15 December 2001	Chesterfield	A	3–2	10	Thomson (pen), Shittu, Rose	4,611
22 December 2001	Bournemouth	A	2–1	8	Thomson 2 (1 pen)	8,147
26 December 2001	Brighton	H	0–0	9		16,412
29 December 2001	Wycombe	H	4–3	6	Thomson, Gallen, Connolly, Peacock	14,834
1 January 2002	Bristol C	A				
5 January 2002	Reading	A	0–1	6		19,329
12 January 2002	Bury	H	3–0	6	Griffiths, Pacquette, Bignot	10,003
19 January 2002	Stoke	A	1–0	5	Peacock	16,725
22 January 2002	Bournemouth	H	1–1	5	Palmer	10,901
26 January 2002	Huddersfield	A	0–1	7		9,433
2 February 2002	Cambridge U	H	0–0	8		18,071
5 February 2002	Bristol C	A	0–2	8		11,654
9 February 2002	Northampton	A	2–2	9	Connolly 2 (1 pen)	6,424
16 February 2002	Wrexham	H	2–1	8	Langley, Gallen	9,706
23 February 2002	Port Vale	A	0–1	11		6,228
26 February 2002	Wigan	H	1–1	10	Gallen	8,519
2 March 2002	Blackpool	H	2–0	9	Gallen, Langley	10,203
5 March 2002	Cardiff	A	1–1	9	Pacquette	13,425
9 March 2002	Chesterfield	H	0–0	9		10,434
16 March 2002	Colchester	A	1–3	10	M'Bombo	4,903
23 March 2002	Peterborough	H	1–0	10	Thomson (pen)	10,324
30 March 2002	Tranmere	A	3–2	8	Thomson 2, Langley	8,619
1 April 2002	Notts County	H	3–2	8	Shittu, Rose, Foley	10,966
6 April 2002	Swindon	A	1–0	8	Thomas 75'	6,774
13 April 2002	Brentford	H	0–0	8		18,346
20 April 2002	Oldham	A	0–1	8		7,262

=== FA Cup ===
Date	Opponent	Venue	Result F–A	Scorers	Attendance
18 November 2001	Swansea City	A	0–4		4,784

=== Worthington Cup ===
Date	Opponent	Venue	Result F–A	Scorers	Attendance
21 August 2001	Northampton Town	A	1 – 2*aet	Evatt	4,638

=== LDV Vans Trophy ===
Date	Opponent	Venue	Result	Result F–A	Scorers	Attendance
16 October 2001	Yeovil Town	A	L	0–3		2,879

=== Friendlies ===
Date	Opponents	Venue	Result F–A	Scorers	Attendance
14 July 2001	Queens Park Rangers v Glasgow Celtic	H			
19 July 2001	Queens Park Rangers v Bishop's Stortford	H			
21 July 2001	Queens Park Rangers v Watford	H			
28 July 2001	Queens Park Rangers v Chelsea	H			
4 August 2001	Queens Park Rangers v Birmingham City	H			
6 August 2001	Hampton & Richmond v Queens Park Rangers	A			
11 October 2001	Tottenham Hotspur v Queens Park Rangers	A			
8 January 2002	Barnet v Queens Park Rangers	A			
25 January 2002	Watford v Queens Park Rangers	A			

== Squad ==
Position	Squad Number	Nationality	Name	League Appearances	League Goals	Cup Appearances	Worthington Cup Goals	F.A.Cup Goals	Total Appearances	Total Goals
GK	1	ENG	Chris Day	16		2			18	
GK	30	ENG	Fraser Digby	19		1			20	
GK	33	ENG	Rhys Evans	11					11	
GK	13	ENG	Nikki Bull							
DF	3	ENG	Paul Bruce	16	1					
DF	4	ENG	Steve Palmer	46	4				49	4
DF	17	ENG	Terrell Forbes	43		2			43	
DF	11	ENG	Marcus Bignot	41	1	3			48	1
DF	12	ENG	Matthew Rose	37	3	1			40	3
DF	23	ENG	Danny Murphy	10					12	
DF	6	ENG	Chris Plummer	1		1			2	
DF	28	FRA	Aziz Ben Askar	18		2			20	
DF	31	NIG	Danny Shittu	27	1				27	1
DF	25	ENG	Ben Walshe							
DF	5	ENG	Clark Carlisle							
DF	2	ENG	Mark Perry	13		3			19	
DF	20	ENG	Lyndon Duncan							
DF	21	ANT	Justin Cochrane							
MF	26	FRA	Alex Bonnot	17		3			25	
MF	37	ENG	Wes Daly	1					1	
MF	35	ENG	Brian Fitzgerald						1	
MF	16	ENG	Hamid Barr						1	
MF	26	ENG	Jerome Thomas	4	1				4	1
MF	24	ENG	Oliver Burgess	4	1				5	1
MF	15	ENG	Christer Warren	8		2			16	
MF	32	ENG	Patrick Gradley							
MF	8	ENG	Gavin Peacock	19	2				20	2
MF	9	ENG	Richard Langley	15	3				18	3
MF	32	VEN	Fernando de Ornelas	1					2	
FW	10	ENG	Karl Connolly	24	4	2			35	
FW	27	ENG	Andy Thomson	29	21	1			39	21
FW	34	ENG	Carl Leaburn						1	
FW	19	ENG	Dave McEwen	2					6	
FW	36	ENG	Dennis Oli						2	
FW	29	FRA	Aziana Ebele Mbombo	20	3	2			39	3
FW	30	ENG	Robert Taylor	3					3	
FW	34	IRE	Dominic Foley	5	1					
FW	18	HOL	Sammy Koejoe						3	
FW	22	ENG	Richard Pacquette	8	2				19	2
FW	7	ENG	Stuart Wardley	6		2			13	
FW	14	ENG	Leroy Griffiths	22	3	1			30	3
FW	38	GHA	Junior Agogo						2	
FW	18	ENG	Kevin Gallen	25	7				25	7

== Transfers Out ==
Name	from	Date	Fee	Date	Club	Fee
Tony Scully	Manchester C	16 March 1998	£150,000	July 2001	Cambridge U	Free
Chris Kiwomya	Arsenal	27 August 1998	Free	July 2001	Aalborg (Den)	Free
Peter Crouch	Tottenham	27 July 2000	£60,000	July 2001	Portsmouth	£1,900,000
Michel Ngonge	Watford	13 December 2000	£60,000	July 2001	Kilmarnock	Free
Danny Maddix	Tottenham	23 July 1987	Free	July 2001	Sheffield W	Free
Karl Ready	Queens Park Rangers Juniors	13 August 1990		July 2001	Motherwell	Free
Steve Morrow	Arsenal	27 March 1997	£500,000	July 2001	Dallas Burn (USA)	Free
Carlos Brown	Queens Park Rangers Juniors	June 1999		July 2001	Hayes	Free
Terry McFlynn	Queens Park Rangers Juniors	11 May 1998		July 2001	Woking	Free
Jermaine Darlington	Aylesbury U	25 March 1999	£25,000	July 2001	Wimbledon	£200,000
Akpo Sodje	Globe Star (Nig)	Feb 2001		July ? 01	Hayes	Free
Antti Heinola	Heracles	12 January 1998	£100,000	July 2001	HJK Helsinki	
Iain Dowie	West Ham United	January 1998	With Keith Rowland and £2,300,000 For Trevor Sinclair	July 2001	Retired	
Leon Jeanne	Queens Park Rangers Juniors	November 1997		July 2001	Cardiff City	
Lee Harper	Arsenal	6 June 1997	£125,000	July 2001	Walsall	Free
Paul Murray	Carlisle United	2 May 1996	Loan then £300,000	August 2001	Southampton	
Gavin Peacock	Chelsea	November 1996	£800,000	August 2001	Charlton Athletic	Loan
Keith Rowland	West Ham United	28 January 1998	With Iain Dowie and £2,300,000 For Trevor Sinclair	August 2001	Chesterfield	Free
Robert Taylor	Wolverhampton	28 August 2001	Loan	1 Sep	Wolverhampton	Loan
Dominic Foley	Watford	25 October 2001	Loan	1 Oct	Watford	Loan
Fernando De Ornelas	Italchacao (Ven)	25 October 2001	Free	1 Nov	Maritimo (Por)	Free
Stuart Wardley	Saffron Walden Town	July 1999	£15,000	January 2002	Rushden & Diamonds	Loan
Dave McEwen	Tottenham	13 July 2001	Free	January 2002	Hertford Town	Free
Carl Leaburn	Wimbledon	31 December 2001	Non-contract	January 2002	Grays Ath.	Free
Alex Bonnot	Watford	31 July 2001	Free	February 2002	Hearts [trial] (Retired)	
Samuel Koejoe	Red Bull Salzburg	November 1999	£250,000	February 2002	A. Lustenau	Free
Dominic Foley	Watford	28 March 2002	Loan	April 2002	Watford	Loan
Stuart Wardley	Saffron Walden Town	19 July 1999	£15,000	April 2002	Rushden & Diamonds	Free
Rhys Evans	Chelsea	6 November 2001	Loan	April 2002	Chelsea	Loan
Jerome Thomas	Arsenal	27 March 2002	Loan	April 2002	Arsenal	Loan
Mark Perry	Queens Park Rangers Juniors	19 October 1995		2 May	Retired	
Nikki Bull	Queens Park Rangers Juniors	Oct 1999		2 May	Aldershot	Free
Aziz Ben Askar	Laval (Fra)	7 August 2001	Loan	2 May	Laval (Fra)	Loan
Justin Cochrane	Queens Park Rangers Juniors	Jan 2001		2 May	Hayes	Free

== Transfers In ==
Name	from	Date	Fee
Steve Palmer	Watford	3 July 2001	£15,000
Hamid Barr	Fisher Athletic	13 July 2001	Free
Alex Bonnot	Watford	31 July 2001	Free
Terrell Forbes	West Ham	13 July 2001	Free
Chris Day	Watford	9 July 2001	Free
Dave McEwen	Tottenham	13 July 2001	Free
Wes Daly	Queens Park Rangers Juniors	August 2001	
Aziz Ben Askar	Laval (Fra)	7 August 2001	Loan
Doudou M'Bombo	Monaco	15 August 2001	Free
Robert Taylor	Wolverhampton	28 August 2001	Loan
Danny Shittu	Charlton	23 October 2001	Loan
Dennis Oli	Queens Park Rangers Juniors	October 2001	
Fraser Digby	Huddersfield	11 October 2001	Free
Fernando De Ornelas	Italchacao (Ven)	25 October 2001	Free
Dominic Foley	Watford	25 October 2001	Loan
Rhys Evans	Chelsea	6 November 2001	Loan
Kevin Gallen	Barnsley	20 November 2001	Free
Carl Leaburn	Wimbledon	31 December 2001	Non-contract
Danny Shittu	Charlton	January 2002	£350,000
Dominic Foley	Watford	28 March 2002	Loan
Junior Agogo	San Jose (USA)	28 March 2002	Non-contract
Jerome Thomas	Arsenal	27 March 2002	Loan
Patrick Gradley	Queens Park Rangers Juniors	19 April 2002	
Wes Daly	Queens Park Rangers Juniors	June2002	
Marcus Bean	Queens Park Rangers Juniors	June2002	
Dennis Oli	Queens Park Rangers Juniors	20 June 2002	
