= 2003–04 Queens Park Rangers F.C. season =

English football club season

Queens Park Rangers
2003–04 season
- Manager: Ian Holloway
- Stadium: Loftus Road
- Second Division: 2nd
- FA Cup: First round
- League Cup: Third round
- Football League Trophy: Semi-finals
- Top goalscorer: League: All: Kevin Gallen (17)
- Highest home attendance: 17,393 29 November 2003 Sheffield Wednesday
- Lowest home attendance: 3,036 4 November 2003 Dagenham & Redbridge
- Average home league attendance: 14,784
- Biggest win: 5–0 Vs Blackpool (9 August 2003)
- Biggest defeat: 0–3 Vs Manchester City (8 October 2003)
Home colours	Away colours	Third colours

During the 2003–04 English football season, Queens Park Rangers competed in the Football League Second Division.

== Season summary ==
After 3 seasons in English football's third tier, QPR secured a return to the second division with a second-placed finish.

== Kit ==
Le Coq Sportif continued as QPR's kit manufacturers. Telecommunications company Binatone became new kit sponsors.

== Final league table ==
=== Football League Second Division ===
Pos	Team	Pld	W	D	L	GF	GA	GD	Pts	Promotion or relegation
1	Plymouth Argyle (C, P)	46	26	12	8	85	41	+44	90	Promotion to Football League Championship
2	Queens Park Rangers (P)	46	22	17	7	80	45	+35	83	Promotion to Football League Championship
3	Bristol City	46	23	13	10	58	37	+21	82	Qualification for the Second Division play-offs
4	Brighton & Hove Albion (O, P)	46	22	11	13	64	43	+21	77	Qualification for the Second Division play-offs
5	Swindon Town	46	20	13	13	76	58	+18	73	Qualification for the Second Division play-offs

Rules for classification: In the Football League goals scored (GF) takes precedence over goal difference (GD).
(C) Champions; (O) Play-off winners; (P) Promoted

== Results ==
=== Legend ===
Win	Draw	Loss

Date	Opponents	Venue	Result F–A	Scorers	Attendance	Position
9 August 2003	Blackpool	H	5–0	Ainsworth 4', 69', Langley 43', Gallen 56', Palmer 90'	14,581	2
18 August 2003	Brighton & Hove Albion	A	1–2	Padula 9'	6,536	10
23 August 2003	AFC Bournemouth	H	1–0	Furlong 63'	13,065	5
25 August 2003	Rushden & Diamonds	A	3–3	Ainsworth 37', 45', Furlong 53'	5,544	6
30 August 2003	Chesterfield	H	3–0	Thorpe 29', 67', Furlong 87'	12,986	3
6 September 2003	Colchester United	A	2–2	Furlong 49', 66'	3,835	4
13 September 2003	Wycombe Wanderers	H	0–0		13,618	5
16 September 2003	Wrexham	A	2–0	Bean 7', Rowlands 90'	4,539	3
20 September 2003	Luton Town	A	1–1	Furlong 90'	8,339	3
27 September 2003	Bristol City	H	1–1	Padula 73'	14,913	4
30 September 2003	Barnsley	H	4–0	Gallen 60', Rowlands 61', Ainsworth 63', Thorpe 77'	11,854	3
4 October 2003	Grimsby Town	A	1–0	Sabin 90'	5,447	2
11 October 2003	Brentford	H	PP			
18 October 2003	Peterborough United	A	0–0		7,247	3
21 October 2003	Port Vale	A	0–2		5,243	6
25 October 2003	Tranmere Rovers	H	1–1	Gallen 47'	12,937	6
1 November 2003	Stockport County	A	2–1	Gallen 19', Rowlands 43'	5,461	3
11 November 2003	Brentford	H	1–0	Thorpe 42'	15,865	2
15 November 2003	Plymouth Argyle	H	3–0	Gallen 33', 75', Thorpe 72'	17,049	1
22 November 2003	Swindon Town	A	1–1	Rowlands 79'	10,021	1
29 November 2003	Sheffield Wednesday	H	3–0	Palmer 13', Thorpe 85', McLeod 90'	17,393	1
13 December 2003	Hartlepool United	H	4–1	Gallen 27',38', Padula 34', Ainsworth 50'	15,003	1
20 December 2003	Oldham Athletic	A	1–2	Thorpe 31'	5,603	2
26 December 2003	Notts County	A	3–3	Palmer 3', Richardson 10' (og), Gallen 90'	7,702	2
28 December 2003	Colchester United	H	2–0	Gallen 12', Thorpe 57'	15,720	2
3 January 2004	Rushden & Diamonds	H	1–0	Gallen 24'	14,141	2
10 January 2004	Blackpool	A	1–0	Rowlands 38'	7,329	2
17 January 2004	Brighton & Hove Albion	H	2–1	Rowlands 20', Gallen 43'	17,839	2
24 January 2004	AFC Bournemouth	A	0–1		8,909	2
31 January 2004	Chesterfield	A	2–4	Thorpe 22', Palmer 63'	4,567	2
7 February 2004	Notts County	H	3–2	Mcleod 54', Thorpe 69', Furlong 83'	14,412	2
14 February 2004	Brentford	A	1–1	Furlong 20'	8,418	2
20 February 2004	Peterborough United	H	1–1	Gallen 90'	13,276	3
28 February 2004	Tranmere Rovers	A	pp			
2 March 2004	Port Vale	H	3–2	Bircham, Cureton 2	12,593	3
6 March 2004	Oldham Athletic	H	1–1	Gallen 54'(pen)	13,696	3
13 March 2004	Hartlepool United	A	4–1	Furlong 48', 74', Gallen 52', Rowlands 76'	6,519	3
16 March 2004	Wrexham	H	2–0	Carlisle,67' McLeod 88'	13,363	2
20 March 2004	Wycombe Wanderers	A	2–2	Gallen 46', Rowlands 68'	7,634	2
27 March 2004	Luton Town	H	1–1	Furlong 45'	17,695	2
3 April 2004	Bristol City	A	0–1		19,041	2
6 April 2004	Tranmere Rovers	A	0–0		7,699	2
10 April 2004	Grimsby Town	H	3–0	Furlong 42', 86', Bircham 84'	14,488	2
12 April 2004	Barnsley	A	3–3	Kay 32' (og), Furlong 74', 90'	10,402	2
17 April 2004	Stockport County	H	1–1	Rowlands 3'	15,162	2
24 April 2004	Plymouth Argyle	A	0–2		19,888	2
1 May 2004	Swindon Town	H	1–0	Rowlands 2'	18,396	2
8 May 2004	Sheffield Wednesday	A	3–1	Gallen 35', Furlong 48', Carr 69' (og)	29,313	2

=== FA Cup ===
Round	Date	Opponent	Venue	Result F–A	Scorers	Attendance
First round	8 November 2003	Grimsby Town	A	0–1		4,144

=== League Cup ===
Round	Date	Opponent	Venue	Result F–A	Scorers	Attendance
First round	12 September 2003	Cheltenham Town	A	2–1	Ainsworth 16', Langley 86'	3,697
Second round	23 September 2003	Sheffield United	A	2–0	Rowlands 31', 45'	9,578
Third round	28 October 2003	Manchester City	H	0–3		16,773

=== Football League Trophy ===
Round	Date	Opponent	Venue	Result F–A	Scorers	Attendance
First round	14 October 2003	Kidderminster Harriers	H	2–0	Pacquette 40', Gnohere 81'	3,671
Second round	4 November 2003	Dagenham & Redbridge	H	2–1	Padula 38', McLeod 82'	4,464
Quarter-final (South)	7 December 2003	Brighton & Hove Albion	H	2–1	Palmer 18', Thorpe 23"	7,535
Semi-final (South)	20 January 2004	Southend United	A	0–4		5,824

=== Friendlies ===
Date		Opponents	Venue	Result F–A	Scorers	Attendance
12-Jul-03		Farnborough Town v Queens Park Rangers	A			
14-Jul-03		Aylesbury United v Queens Park Rangers	A			
19-Jul-03	Craig Norman Testimonial	Kettering Town v Queens Park Rangers	A			
26-Jul-03		Queens Park Rangers v Watford	H			
2-Aug-03		Dagenham & Redbridge v Queens Park Rangers	A			
4-Aug-03		Queens Park Rangers v Charlton Athletic	H			

== Squad ==
Position		Nationality	Name	League		League Cup		FA Cup		Total	
Position	Squad Number	Nationality	Name	Apps	Goals	Apps	Goals	Apps	Goals	Apps	Goals
GK	1	ENG	Chris Day	29		5		1		34	
GK	31	ENG	Lee Camp	12						12	
GK	13	ENG	Nick Culkin	5		3				8	
GK	24	ENG	Jake Cole								
DF	20	CIV	Arthur Gnohere	17		1				19	
DF	4	ENG	Steve Palmer	24	4	4		1		41	4
DF	2	ENG	Terrell Forbes	30		8		1		38	
DF	17	JAM	Marcus Bean	23	1	5		1		36	1
DF	7	ENG	Matthew Rose	15		1				22	
DF	20	ENG	Warren Barton	2		2				5	
DF	12	ENG	Marcus Bignot	6						6	
DF	23	ENG	Richard Edghill	15		3				24	
DF	5	ENG	Clarke Carlisle	32	1	6		1		39	1
DF	3	ARG	Gino Padula	36	3	6				42	3
DF	6	NGA	Danny Shittu	18		4				24	
DF	25	ENG	John Fletcher								
DF	26	ENG	Ryan Johnson								
DF	32	ENG	Jack Perry								
DF	19	ENG	Ben Walshe								
DF	21	COD	Marien Ifura								
MF	27	ENG	Dean Marney	1		1				3	
MF	16	ENG	Wes Daly					1		3	
MF	33	ENG	Tom Williams	4						5	
MF	30	AUS	Richard Johnson	10						11	
MF	14	ENG	Martin Rowlands	40	10	7	2	1		47	12
MF	8	CAN	Marc Bircham	36	2	5				43	2
MF	22	ENG	Kevin McLeod	26	3	4		1		39	3
MF	9	JAM	Richard Langley	1	1					2	1
MF	11	ENG	Gareth Ainsworth	21	6	5	1	1		35	6
FW	29	ENG	Paul Furlong	31	16	3				40	16
FW	18	ENG	Dennis Oli			2		1		7	
FW	15	DMA	Richard Pacquette			3				5	
FW	9	ENG	Tony Thorpe	22	10	2		1		35	10
FW	28	ENG	Jamie Cureton	2	2					13	
FW	12	FRA	Éric Sabin	4	1	1		1		15	1
FW	10	ENG	Kevin Gallen	44	17	6		1		53	17

=== Left club during season ===
Note: Flags indicate national team as defined under FIFA eligibility rules; some limited exceptions apply. Players may hold more than one non-FIFA nationality.

No.	Pos.	Nation	Player
9	MF	JAM	Richard Langley (Note: Langley was born in Brent, England, but also qualified to represent Jamaica internationally through his father and made his international debut for Jamaica in 2002.) (to Cardiff City)
12	FW	FRA	Éric Sabin (Note: Sabin was born in Sarcelles, France, but also qualified to represent Martinique internationally and would make his international debut for Martinique in 2008.) (to Northampton Town)
20	DF	ENG	Warren Barton (to Wimbledon)

No.	Pos.	Nation	Player
27	MF	ENG	Dean Marney (on loan from Tottenham Hotspur)
33	DF	ENG	Tom Williams (Note: Williams was born in Sutton, England, but also qualified to represent Cyprus internationally through his mother and would make his international debut for Cyprus in 2006.) (on loan from Birmingham City)

== Transfers Out ==
Name	from	Date	Fee	Date	Club	Fee
Andy Thomson	Gillingham	March 2001	Free	July 2003	Partick Thistle	Free
Danny Murphy	Queens Park Rangers Juniors	December 1999		July 2003	Swindon Town	Free
Oliver Burgess	Queens Park Rangers Juniors	July 2001		July 2003	Northampton Town	
Brian Fitzgerald	Queens Park Rangers Juniors	July 2001		3 July 2003	Northwood	Free
David Wattley	Queens Park Rangers Juniors	8 Sep 2000		3 July 2003	Lincoln C	Free
Leroy Griffiths	Hampton & Richmond	31 May 2001	£40,000	3 July 2003	Farnborough	Free
Lyndon Duncan	Queens Park Rangers Juniors	June 2001		3 July 2003	Exeter	Free
Oliver Burgess	Queens Park Rangers Juniors	June 2000		3 July 2003	Northampton	Free
Patrick Gradley	Queens Park Rangers Juniors	19 Apr 2002		3 July 2003	Gravesend	Free
Karl Connolly	Wrexham	31 May 2000	Free	3 August 2003	Swansea	Free
Richard Langley	Queens Park Rangers Juniors	31 Dec 1996		August 2003	Cardiff City	£250,000
Tommy Williams	Birmingham	4 Aug 2003	Loan	3 Sep 2003	Birmingham	Loan
Arthur Gnohere	Burnley	4 Sep 2003	Loan	3 Oct 2003	Burnley	Loan
Doudou M'Bombo	Monaco	15 Aug 2001	Free	January 2004	Farnborough	Free
Richard Pacquette	Queens Park Rangers Juniors	February 2000		February 2004	Mansfield Town	Loan
Scott Mulholland	Queens Park Rangers Juniors	July 2003		February 2004	Hastings United	
Warren Barton	Derby	3 Oct 2003	Free	February 2004	Wimbledon	Free
Dean Marney	Tottenham	16 Jan 2004	Loan	4 Feb 2004	Tottenham	Loan
Eric Sabin	Swindon Town	9 July 2003		March 2004	Boston United	Loan
Eric Sabin	Swindon Town	9 July 2003		March 2004	Northampton Town	Free
Lee Camp	Derby	12 Mar 2004	Loan	4 May 2004	Derby	Loan
Clarke Carlisle	Blackpool	24 May 2000	£250,000	4 June 2004	Leeds	Free
Marien Ifura	Queens Park Rangers Juniors	July 2003		4 June 2004	Kingstonian	Free
Steve Palmer	Watford	3 July 2001	£15,000	4 June 2004	Milton Keynes Dons	Free

== Transfers In ==
Name	from	Date	Fee
Gareth Ainsworth	Cardiff	1 July 2003	Free
Marien Ifura	Queens Park Rangers Juniors	July 2003	
Scott Mulholland	Queens Park Rangers Juniors	July 2003	
Eric Sabin	Swindon	9 July 2003	Free
Martin Rowlands	Brentford	August 2003	Free
Tommy Williams	Birmingham	4 Aug 2003	Loan
Kevin McLeod	Everton	18 Aug 2003	£50,000
Richard Edghill	Sheffield U	22 Aug 2003	Free
Tony Thorpe	Luton	22 Aug 2003	£50,000
Arthur Gnohere	Burnley	4 Sep 2003	Loan
Warren Barton	Derby	3 Oct 2003	Free
Jack Perry	Stockport	Dec 2003	Free
Dean Marney	Tottenham	16 Jan 2004	Loan
Jamie Cureton	Busan Icons (S.Korea)	2 Feb 2004	£30,000
Richard Johnson	Stoke	17 Feb 2004	Free
Arthur Gnohere	Burnley	18 Feb 2004	£75,000
Lee Camp	Derby	12 Mar 2004	Loan
Marcus Bignot	Rushden & Diamonds	25 Mar 2004	
Jake Cole	Queens Park Rangers Juniors	June 2004	
