= 2011–12 West Bromwich Albion F.C. season =

West Bromwich Albion
2011–12 season
- Chairman: Jeremy Peace
- Manager: Roy Hodgson
- Stadium: The Hawthorns
- Premier League: 10th
- FA Cup: Fourth round (eliminated by Norwich City)
- League Cup: Second round (eliminated by Everton)
- Top goalscorer: League: Peter Odemwingie (10); All: Peter Odemwingie (11)
- Highest home attendance: 26,358 (vs. Arsenal)
- Lowest home attendance: 12,454 (vs. Cardiff City)
- Average home league attendance: 24,639
Home colours	Away colours	Third colours

The 2011–12 season was West Bromwich Albion's second consecutive season in the Premier League, their sixth in total. During the season, they competed in the League Cup and the FA Cup. Albion finished the season in 10th place after their last league game was a 2–3 loss against Arsenal.

The club introduced the "Baggies Brick Road" outside the East Stand of their home ground, The Hawthorns. Supporters were given the opportunity to purchase personalised bricks to add to the walkway. The first bricks were laid by broadcaster Adrian Chiles and comedian Frank Skinner, both of whom are Albion fans.

== Players ==
=== First-team squad ===
Note: Flags indicate national team as defined under FIFA eligibility rules; some limited exceptions apply. Players may hold more than one non-FIFA nationality.

No.	Pos.	Nation	Player
1	GK	ENG	Ben Foster (on loan from Birmingham City)
3	DF	SWE	Jonas Olsson (vice-captain)
5	MF	CMR	Somen Tchoyi
6	DF	ENG	Liam Ridgewell
7	MF	SCO	James Morrison (Note: Morrison was born in Darlington, England, and represented them at U-17, U-18, U-19, and U-21 level, but also qualified to represent Scotland internationally through his grandparents and made his international debut for Scotland in May 2008.)
8	MF	IRL	Keith Andrews
9	FW	IRL	Shane Long
11	MF	NIR	Chris Brunt (club captain)
12	DF	IRL	Steven Reid (Note: Reid was born in Kingston upon Thames, England, and represented them at U-16 level, but also qualified to represent the Republic of Ireland internationally through his grandfather and made his international debut for the Republic of Ireland in 2001.)
13	GK	HUN	Márton Fülöp
14	MF	ENG	Jerome Thomas
17	MF	SCO	Graham Dorrans
19	GK	ENG	Luke Daniels

No.	Pos.	Nation	Player
20	DF	ENG	Nicky Shorey
21	MF	COD	Youssouf Mulumbu (Note: Mulumbu was born in Kinshasa, Zaire (now Democratic Republic of the Congo), but also qualified to represent France internationally and represented them at U-20 and U-21 level before making his international debut for the Democratic Republic of the Congo in March 2008.)
22	MF	HUN	Zoltán Gera
23	DF	NIR	Gareth McAuley
24	FW	NGA	Peter Odemwingie (Note: Odemwingie was born in Tashkent, Uzbek SRR, Soviet Union (now Uzbekistan), but also qualified to represent Nigeria internationally through his father and made his international debut for Nigeria in May 2002.)
25	DF	ENG	Craig Dawson
26	DF	ENG	James Hurst
28	DF	ENG	Billy Jones
29	MF	ENG	George Thorne
30	DF	ROU	Gabriel Tamaș
31	FW	IRL	Simon Cox (Note: Cox was born in Tilehurst, England, but also qualified to represent the Republic of Ireland internationally through his grandfather and made his international debut for the Republic of Ireland in May 2011.)
32	FW	GUF	Marc-Antoine Fortuné
33	MF	AUT	Paul Scharner

=== Reserves and academy ===
Note: Flags indicate national team as defined under FIFA eligibility rules; some limited exceptions apply. Players may hold more than one non-FIFA nationality.

No.	Pos.	Nation	Player
36	MF	ENG	Adil Nabi
37	FW	WAL	Kayleden Brown (Note: Brown was born in Birmingham, England, but also qualified to represent Wales internationally and represented them at U-17 and U-19 level.)
38	FW	ENG	Saido Berahino (Note: Berahino was born in Bujumbura, Burundi, but was raised in England from the age of 10 and represented them at every youth level between U-16 and U-21 level before making his international debut for Burundi in September 2018.)

No.	Pos.	Nation	Player
39	FW	ENG	Kemar Roofe
42	DF	ENG	Cameron Gayle
43	MF	ENG	Jamie Edge

=== Out on loan ===
Note: Flags indicate national team as defined under FIFA eligibility rules; some limited exceptions apply. Players may hold more than one non-FIFA nationality.

No.	Pos.	Nation	Player
2	DF	ENG	Joe Mattock (at Brighton & Hove Albion)
15	FW	NZL	Chris Wood (at Bristol City)
16	MF	SCO	Scott Allan (at Portsmouth)
18	DF	CHI	Gonzalo Jara (at Brighton & Hove Albion)
27	MF	ENG	Sam Mantom (at Walsall)

No.	Pos.	Nation	Player
34	DF	ENG	Paul Downing (at Barnet)
35	MF	SKN	Romaine Sawyers (Note: Sawyers was born in Birmingham, England, but also qualified to represent Saint Kitts and Nevis internationally and represented them at U-23 level before making his international debut for Saint Kitts and Nevis in October 2012.) (at Shrewsbury Town)
40	DF	ENG	Liam O'Neil (at VPS)
41	FW	ENG	Lateef Elford-Alliyu (Note: Elford-Alliyu was born in Ibadan, Nigeria, but also qualified to represent England internationally and represented them at U-17 level.) (at Bury)
—	GK	WAL	Boaz Myhill (Note: Myhill was born in Modesto, California, United States, but was raised in England from the age of 1, qualifying to represent any of the home nations. He represented England at U-17, U-18, and U-20 level before making his international debut for Wales in March 2008.) (at Birmingham City)

== Results and fixtures ==
=== Pre-season ===
West Brom played no early home pre-season friendlies this season, because of development and leveling of the pitch at The Hawthorns.

13 July 2011	San Jose Earthquakes	2–1	West Bromwich Albion	Santa Clara, California, USA
03:30 a.m. (BST)	Bingham 3'; Stephenson 45'	Report	Thomas 53'	Stadium: Buck Shaw Stadium; Attendance: 6,872; Referee: Alejandro Mariscal

17 July 2011	Ventura County Fusion	2–4	West Bromwich Albion	Ventura, California, USA
23:00 (BST)	Riley 29'; Barrera 49'	Report	Dorrans 3'; Cox 54'; Brunt 58' (pen.); Bednář 66'	Stadium: Ventura College; Attendance: – Referee: –

21 July 2011	Portland Timbers	2–3	West Bromwich Albion	Portland, Oregon, USA
04:00 a.m. (BST)	Johnson 26'; Lowry 29'	Report	Morrison 65'; Tchoyi 68'; Tamaș 90'	Stadium: Jeld-Wen Field; Attendance: – Referee: A Chapman

26 July 2011	Rochdale	3–0	West Bromwich Albion	Rochdale
19:30	Grimes 6'; Jones 28' (pen.); Akpa Akpro 79'	Report		Stadium: Spotland Stadium; Attendance: 1,743; Referee: J Moss

27 July 2011	Southampton	2–2	West Bromwich Albion	Southampton
19:45	Cork 73'; Lambert 85'	Report	Cox 58', 75'	Stadium: St Mary's Stadium; Attendance: 7,038; Referee: K Stroud

30 July 2011	Bristol City	0–1	West Bromwich Albion	Bristol
15:00		Report	Dawson 88'	Stadium: Ashton Gate; Attendance: 7,346; Referee: S. Hooper

4 August 2011	Olympiacos	2–2	West Bromwich Albion	Piraeus, Greece
21:00	2'; 18' (pen.)		Dorrans 4'; Thomas 47'	Stadium: Karaiskakis Stadium; Attendance: – Referee: –

7 August 2011	West Bromwich Albion	1–1	Parma	West Bromwich
15:00				Stadium: The Hawthorns; Attendance: – Referee: –

=== Premier League ===
Matchday	1	2	3	4	5	6	7	8	9	10	11	12	13	14	15	16	17	18	19	20	21	22	23	24	25	26	27	28	29	30	31	32	33	34	35	36	37	38
Ground	H	A	H	A	A	H	A	H	A	H	A	H	H	A	H	A	A	H	H	A	H	A	A	H	A	H	H	A	A	H	A	H	A	H	A	H	A	H
Result	L	L	L	W	L	D	D	W	W	L	L	W	L	D	L	W	W	D	L	L	L	W	D	L	W	W	W	L	D	L	L	W	L	W	W	D	D	L
Position	17	18	19	14	20	19	17	12	12	13	14	10	14	14	15	13	10	9	12	15	15	15	15	15	14	13	10	14	12	14	14	13	13	13	10	10	10	10

Source: WorldFootball.com
A = Away; H = Home; W = Win; D = Draw; L = Loss

14 August 2011 1	West Bromwich Albion	1–2	Manchester United	West Bromwich
16:00 BST	Long 37'; Reid (yellow card) 38'; Scharner (yellow card) 86'; Cox (yellow card) 90+2'		13' Rooney; Young (yellow card) 56'; Anderson (yellow card) 78'; 81' (o.g.) Reid	Stadium: The Hawthorns; Attendance: 25,360 (2,600 away); Referee: Mike Jones

20 August 2011 2	Chelsea	2–1	West Bromwich Albion	London
17:30 BST	Anelka 53'; Malouda 83'		4' Long	Stadium: Stamford Bridge; Attendance: 41,091 (1,500 away)

28 August 2011 3	West Bromwich Albion	0–1	Stoke City	West Bromwich
15:00 BST			89' Shotton	Stadium: The Hawthorns; Attendance: 22,909 (1,764 away)

11 September 2011 4	Norwich City	0–1	West Bromwich Albion	Norwich
13:30 BST			3' Odemwingie	Stadium: Carrow Road; Attendance: 26,158

17 September 2011 5	Swansea City	3–0	West Bromwich Albion	Swansea
15:00 BST	Sinclair 14' (pen.); Lita 24'; Dyer 49'	Report		Stadium: Liberty Stadium; Attendance: 20,341 (2,100 away); Referee: Martin Atkinson

24 September 2011 6	West Bromwich Albion	0–0	Fulham	West Bromwich
15:00 BST		Report		Stadium: The Hawthorns; Attendance: 23,835 (887 away); Referee: Stuart Attwell

1 October 2011 7	Sunderland	2–2	West Bromwich Albion	Sunderland
15:00 BST	Bendtner 24'; Elmohamady 26'	Report	4' Morrison; 5' Long	Stadium: Stadium of Light; Attendance: 34,815; Referee: Lee Mason

16 October 2011 8	West Bromwich Albion	2–0	Wolverhampton Wanderers	West Bromwich
12:00 BST	Brunt 8'; Odemwingie 75'	Report		Stadium: The Hawthorns; Attendance: 24,872 (2,600 away); Referee: Chris Foy

22 October 2011 9	Aston Villa	1–2	West Bromwich Albion	Birmingham
15:00	Bent 23' (pen.)	Report	Olsson 45'; Scharner 57'	Stadium: Villa Park; Attendance: 34,152 (2,800 away); Referee: Phil Dowd

29 October 2011 10	West Bromwich Albion	0–2	Liverpool	West Bromwich
17:30 BST		Report	Adam 9' (pen.); Carroll 45+1'	Stadium: The Hawthorns; Attendance: 25,522; Referee: Lee Mason

5 November 2011 11	Arsenal	3–0	West Bromwich Albion	London
15:00 GMT	Van Persie 22'; Vermaelen 39'; Arteta 79'	Report		Stadium: Emirates Stadium; Attendance: 60,091; Referee: Michael Oliver

19 November 2011 12	West Bromwich Albion	2–1	Bolton Wanderers	West Bromwich
15:00 GMT	Thomas 16'; Long 56'	Report	Klasnić 21' (pen.)	Stadium: The Hawthorns; Attendance: 26,221; Referee: Neil Swarbrick

26 November 2011 13	West Bromwich Albion	1–3	Tottenham Hotspur	West Bromwich
15:00 GMT	Mulumbu 8'	report	Adebayor 25', 90+3'; Defoe 81'	Stadium: The Hawthorns; Attendance: 24,801 (2,600 away); Referee: Lee Probert

3 December 2011 14	Queens Park Rangers	1–1	West Bromwich Albion	London
15:00 BST	Helguson 20'	Report	Long 81'	Stadium: Loftus Road; Attendance: 17,290 (1,643 away); Referee: Martin Atkinson

10 December 2011 15	West Bromwich Albion	1–2	Wigan Athletic	West Bromwich
15:00 GMT	Reid 33'	report	Moses 37'; Gómez 57' (pen.)	Stadium: The Hawthorns; Attendance: 26,446 (700 away); Referee: Mike Dean

17 December 2011 16	Blackburn Rovers	1–2	West Bromwich Albion	Blackburn
15:00 GMT	Dann 72'	Report	Morrison 52'; Odemwingie 89'	Stadium: Ewood Park; Attendance: 22,909 (2,564 away); Referee: Mark Clattenburg

21 December 2011 17	Newcastle United	2–3	West Bromwich Albion	Newcastle upon Tyne
20:00 GMT	Ba 31', 81'	Report	Odemwingie 20'; McAuley 44'; Scharner 85'	Stadium: St James' Park; Attendance: 51,060; Referee: Taylor

26 December 2011 18	West Bromwich Albion	0–0	Manchester City	West Bromwich
15:00 GMT		Report		Stadium: The Hawthorns; Attendance: 25,938 (2,600 away); Referee: Lee Mason

1 January 2012 19	West Bromwich Albion	0–1	Everton	West Bromwich
12:45 GMT		Report	Anichebe 87'	Stadium: The Hawthorns; Attendance: 23,038; Referee: Stuart Attwell

3 January 2012 20	Tottenham Hotspur	1–0	West Bromwich Albion	London
19:45 GMT	Defoe 63'	Report		Stadium: White Hart Lane; Attendance: 36,062 (980 away); Referee: Mark Halsey

14 January 2012 21	West Bromwich Albion	1–2	Norwich City	West Bromwich
15:00 GMT	Long 68' (pen.)	Report	Surman 43'; Morison 79'	Stadium: The Hawthorns; Attendance: 24,474 (2,598 away); Referee: Mike Dean

21 January 2012 22	Stoke City	1–2	West Bromwich Albion	Stoke-on-Trent
15:00 GMT	Jerome 86'	Report	Morrison 35'; Dorrans 90+1'	Stadium: Britannia Stadium; Attendance: 26,865 (2,095 away); Referee: Anthony Taylor

1 February 2012 23	Fulham	1–1	West Bromwich Albion	London
19:45 GMT	Dempsey 69'	Report	Tchoyi 82'	Stadium: Craven Cottage; Attendance: 25,689; Referee: Mark Halsey

4 February 2012 24	West Bromwich Albion	1–2	Swansea City	West Bromwich
15:00 GMT	Fortuné 54'	Report	Sigurðsson 55'; Graham 59'	Stadium: The Hawthorns; Attendance: 24,274; Referee: Jonathan Moss

12 February 2012 25	Wolverhampton Wanderers	1–5	West Bromwich Albion	Wolverhampton
13:30 GMT	Fletcher 45'	report	Odemwingie 34', 77', 88'; Olsson 64'; Andrews 85'	Stadium: Molineux Stadium; Attendance: 27,131 (2,359 away); Referee: Lee Mason

25 February 2012 26	West Bromwich Albion	4–0	Sunderland	West Bromwich
15:00 GMT	Odemwingie 3', 48'; James Morrison 41'; Andrews 90+1'	report		Stadium: The Hawthorns; Attendance: 25,311; Referee: Chris Foy

3 March 2012 27	West Bromwich Albion	1–0	Chelsea	West Bromwich
15:00 GMT	McAuley 82'	report		Stadium: The Hawthorns; Attendance: 24,838 (2,600 away); Referee: Phil Dowd

11 March 2012 28	Manchester United	2–0	West Bromwich Albion	Manchester
15:00 BST	Rooney 35', 71'	report		Stadium: Old Trafford; Attendance: 75,598 (1,886 away); Referee: Lee Probert

17 March 2012 29	Wigan Athletic	1–1	West Bromwich Albion	Wigan
15:00 BST	McArthur 54'	Report	Scharner 65'	Stadium: DW Stadium; Attendance: 21,379 (4,600 away); Referee: Michael Oliver

25 March 2012 30	West Bromwich Albion	1–3	Newcastle United	West Bromwich
16:00 BST	Long 52'	Report	Cissé 6', 34'; Ben Arfa 12'; Williamson (yellow card) 69'	Stadium: The Hawthorns; Attendance: 25,049; Referee: Chris Foy

31 March 2012 31	Everton	2–0	West Bromwich Albion	Liverpool
15:00 BST	McAuley 18' (o.g.); Anichebe 87'	Report		Stadium: Goodison Park; Attendance: 32,051; Referee: Peter Walton

7 April 2012 32	West Bromwich Albion	3–0	Blackburn Rovers	West Bromwich
15:00	Martin Olsson 7' (o.g.); Fortuné 69'; Ridgewell 85'	Report		Stadium: The Hawthorns; Attendance: 23,414 (871 away); Referee: Lee Probert

11 April 2012 33	Manchester City	4–0	West Bromwich Albion	Manchester
19:45	Agüero 6', 54'; Tevez 61'; Silva 64'	Report		Stadium: Etihad Stadium; Attendance: 46,746 (1,184 away); Referee: Friend

14 April 2012 34	West Bromwich Albion	1–0	Queens Park Rangers	West Bromwich
15:00	Dorrans 22', (yellow card) 70'; Mulumbu (yellow card) 51'; Ridgewell (yellow card) 61'	Report	Diakité (yellow card) 56'	Stadium: The Hawthorns; Attendance: 25,521 (2,597 away); Referee: Moss

22 April 2012 35	Liverpool	0–1	West Bromwich Albion	Liverpool
16:00	Shelvey (yellow card) 90+4'	Report	Odemwingie 75'	Stadium: Anfield; Attendance: 43,660 (1,647 away); Referee: Swarbrick

28 April 2012 36	West Bromwich Albion	0–0	Aston Villa	West Bromwich
15:00		Report	Warnock (yellow card) 37'; Hutton (yellow card) 43'; Clark (yellow card) 59'; Heskey (yellow card) 62'	Stadium: The Hawthorns; Attendance: 25,984 (2,595 away); Referee: Mark Clattenburg

6 May 2012 37	Bolton Wanderers	2–2	West Bromwich Albion	Bolton
14:00	Petrov 24' (pen.); Boyata (yellow card) 38'; Jones 72' (o.g.)	Report	Jones (yellow card) 45'; Long (yellow card) 54'; Andrews (yellow card) 56'; Brunt (yellow card) 73', (goal) 75'; Morrison 90'	Stadium: Reebok Stadium; Attendance: 25,662 (4,780 away); Referee: Kevin Friend

13 May 2012 38	West Bromwich Albion	2–3	Arsenal	The Hawthorns
15:00	Long 11'; Dorrans 15'		Benayoun 4'; Santos 30'; Koscielny 54'	Attendance: 26,358 (2,600 away); Referee: Mike Jones

=== League Cup ===
23 August 2011 R2	AFC Bournemouth	1–4	West Bromwich Albion	Bournemouth
19:45	Lovell 48'		Thomas 7'; Fortuné 42', 78'; Cox 53'	Stadium: Seward Stadium; Attendance: 6,911 (864 away)

21 September 2011 R3	Everton	2–1 (a.e.t.)	West Bromwich Albion	Liverpool
20:00	Fellaini 89'; Neville 103'		Brunt 57' (pen.)	Stadium: Goodison Park; Attendance: 17,647

=== FA Cup ===
7 January 2012 R3	West Bromwich Albion	4–2	Cardiff City	West Bromwich
15:00	Odemwingie 7'; Cox 33', 61', 90'		Earnshaw 36'; Mason 50'	Stadium: The Hawthorns; Attendance: 12,454 (2,003 away)

28 January 2012 R4	West Bromwich Albion	1–2	Norwich City	West Bromwich
15:00	Fortuné 54'		Holt 35'; Jackson 85'	Stadium: The Hawthorns; Attendance: 17,434 (3,797 away)

== League table ==
Pos	Team	Pld	W	D	L	GF	GA	GD	Pts	Qualification or relegation
8	Liverpool	38	14	10	14	47	40	+7	52	Qualification for the Europa League third qualifying round (Note: Liverpool won the League Cup and thus qualified for the Europa League third qualifying round.)
9	Fulham	38	14	10	14	48	51	−3	52	
10	West Bromwich Albion	38	13	8	17	45	52	−7	47	
11	Swansea City	38	12	11	15	44	51	−7	47	
12	Norwich City	38	12	11	15	52	66	−14	47	

Source: Barclays Premier League
Rules for classification: 1) points; 2) goal difference; 3) number of goals scored.

== Players statistics ==
As of 31 May 2012

No.	Pos	Nat	Player	Total		Premier League		FA Cup		League Cup	
No.	Pos	Nat	Player	Apps	Goals	Apps	Goals	Apps	Goals	Apps	Goals
1	GK	(England) ENG	Ben Foster	39	0	37	0	2	0	0	0
2	DF	(England) ENG	Joe Mattock	3	0	0	0	1	0	1+1	0
3	DF	(Sweden) SWE	Jonas Olsson	34	2	33	2	0	0	1	0
4	DF	(Slovakia) SVK	Marek Cech	1	0	0	0	0	0	1	0
5	MF	(Cameroon) CMR	Somen Tchoyi	21	1	6+12	1	0+2	0	1	0
6	DF	(England) ENG	Liam Ridgewell	13	1	13	1	0	0	0	0
7	MF	(Scotland) SCO	James Morrison	33	5	23+7	5	2	0	0+1	0
8	MF	(Republic of Ireland) IRL	Keith Andrews	14	2	8+6	2	0	0	0	0
9	FW	(Republic of Ireland) IRL	Shane Long	34	8	24+8	8	0+1	0	1	0
11	MF	(Northern Ireland) NIR	Chris Brunt	28	3	23+4	2	0	0	1	1
12	DF	(Republic of Ireland) IRL	Steven Reid	22	1	21+1	1	0	0	0	0
13	GK	(Hungary) HUN	Márton Fülöp	3	0	1	0	0	0	2	0
14	MF	(England) ENG	Jerome Thomas	31	2	26+3	1	1	0	1	1
17	MF	(Scotland) SCO	Graham Dorrans	35	3	16+15	3	2	0	2	0
18	DF	(Chile) CHI	Gonzalo Jara	7	0	1+3	0	2	0	1	0
20	DF	(England) ENG	Nicky Shorey	26	0	22+3	0	1	0	0	0
21	MF	(Democratic Republic of the Congo) COD	Youssuf Mulumbu	36	1	34+1	1	1	0	0	0
22	MF	(Hungary) HUN	Zoltán Gera	3	0	3	0	0	0	0	0
23	DF	(Northern Ireland) NIR	Gareth McAuley	36	2	32	2	1+1	0	2	0
24	FW	(Nigeria) NGA	Peter Odemwingie	32	11	25+5	10	1	1	1	0
25	DF	(England) ENG	Craig Dawson	12	0	6+2	0	2	0	1+1	0
27	MF	(England) ENG	Sam Mantom	1	0	0	0	0	0	0+1	0
28	DF	(England) ENG	Billy Jones	21	0	17+1	0	1	0	2	0
29	MF	(England) ENG	George Thorne	6	0	1+2	0	1	0	2	0
30	DF	(Romania) ROU	Gabriel Tamaș	10	0	7+1	0	1+1	0	0	0
31	FW	(Republic of Ireland) IRL	Simon Cox	22	4	7+11	0	2	3	2	1
32	FW	(France) FRA	Marc-Antoine Fortuné	20	5	12+5	2	1+1	1	1	2
33	MF	(Austria) AUT	Paul Scharner	30	3	18+11	3	0	0	0+1	0
43	FW	(Czech Republic) CZE	Roman Bednář	1	0	0	0	0	0	0+1	0

=== Captains ===
No.	P	Name	Country	No. games	Notes
11	MF	Chris Brunt	(Northern Ireland)	10	Club captain

Last updated: 6 June 2011
Source: Competitive match reports.
Competitive matches only
Matches started as captain only
Country: FIFA nationality; No.: Squad number; P: Position; Name: Player name; No. Games: Number of games started as captain.

=== Top scorers ===
Last updated on 20 May 2012 (Not fully Checked)

Place	Position	Nation	Number	Name	Premiership	FA Cup	League Cup	Total
1	FW	(Nigeria)	24	Peter Odemwingie	10	1	0	11
2	FW	(Republic of Ireland)	9	Shane Long	8	0	0	8
3	FW	(French Guiana)	32	Marc-Antoine Fortuné	2	1	2	5
4	MF	(Scotland)	7	James Morrison	5	0	0	5
=	FW	(Republic of Ireland)	31	Simon Cox	0	3	1	4
4	MF	(Austria)	33	Paul Scharner	3	0	0	3
5	DF	(Sweden)	3	Jonas Olsson	2	0	0	2
=	MF	(Republic of Ireland)	8	Keith Andrews	2	0	0	2
=	MF	(Northern Ireland)	11	Chris Brunt	2	0	1	3
=	MF	(England)	14	Jerome Thomas	1	0	1	2
=	DF	(Northern Ireland)	23	Gareth McAuley	2	0	0	2
11	MF	(Cameroon)	5	Somen Tchoyi	1	0	0	1
=	DF	(England)	6	Liam Ridgewell	1	0	0	1
=	MF	(Republic of Ireland)	12	Steven Reid	1	0	1	2
=	MF	(Scotland)	17	Graham Dorrans	3	0	0	3
=	MF	(Democratic Republic of the Congo)	21	Youssuf Mulumbu	1	0	0	1
=	/	/	Own Goals	1	0	0	1	
Totals					44	5	7	56

== Transfers ==
=== In ===
Date	Player	From	Fee
23 May 2011	(Northern Ireland) Gareth McAuley	(England) Ipswich Town	Free
3 June 2011	(England) Billy Jones	(England) Preston North End	Free
29 July 2011	(England) Ben Foster	(England) Birmingham City	Season-long loan
2 August 2011	(Hungary) Zoltán Gera	(England) Fulham	Free
6 August 2011	(England) Jamie Edge	(England) Arsenal	Free
7 August 2011	(Hungary) Márton Fülöp	(England) Ipswich Town	Free
9 August 2011	(Republic of Ireland) Shane Long	(England) Reading	£7,500,000
9 January 2012	(Scotland) Scott Allan	(Scotland) Dundee United	Undisclosed
31 January 2012	(England) Liam Ridgewell	(England) Birmingham City	£2,500,000
31 January 2012	(Republic of Ireland) Keith Andrews	(England) Blackburn Rovers	Free

=== Out ===
Date	Player	To	Fee
25 May 2011	(England) Giles Barnes (Note: Barnes was born in Barking and Dagenham, England, and represented them at U-19 level, but also qualified to represent Jamaica internationally through his grandparents, declared for them internationally in 2014, and would make his international debut for Jamaica in May 2015.)	Free Agency (Note: Signed for Doncaster Rovers on August 4, 2011)	Released
25 May 2011	(Canada) Marcus Haber	Free Agency (Note: Signed for St Johnstone on July 22, 2011)	Released
25 May 2011	(Ivory Coast) Abdoulaye Méïté (Note: Méïté was born in Colombes, France, but also qualified to represent the Ivory Coast internationally and made his international debut for the Ivory Coast in 2003.)	Free Agency (Note: Signed for Dijon on June 30, 2011)	Released
25 May 2011	(Netherlands) Gianni Zuiverloon	Free Agency (Note: Signed for RCD Mallorca on July 10, 2011)	Released
1 July 2011	(England) Scott Carson	(Turkey) Bursaspor	£1,500,000
	(Republic of Ireland) Dean Kiely (Note: Kiely was born in Salford, England, and represented them at U-15, U-16, and U-18 level, but also qualified to represent the Republic of Ireland internationally and made his international debut for the Republic of Ireland in November 1999.)	Retired	
1 July 2011	(Spain) Borja Valero	(Spain) Villarreal	Undisclosed
29 July 2011	(Wales) Boaz Myhill	(England) Birmingham City	Loan
5 August 2011	(New Zealand) Chris Wood	(England) Birmingham City	Loan
15 August 2011	(England) Ishmael Miller	(England) Nottingham Forest	£1,200,000
31 August 2011	(England) James Hurst	(England) Blackpool	Loan
	(Slovakia) Marek Čech	(Turkey) Trabzonspor	Undisclosed
	(Spain) Pablo Ibáñez	(England) Birmingham City	Undisclosed
	(England) Saido Berahino	(England) Northampton Town	Loan
21 October 2011	(Chile) Gonzalo Jara	(England) Brighton & Hove Albion	Loan
	(England) Luke Daniels	(England) Southend United	Loan
	(England) Paul Downing	(England) Barnet	Loan
	(England) James Hurst	(England) Shrewsbury Town	Loan
	(England) Joe Mattock	(England) Portsmouth	Loan
	(England) George Thorne	(England) Portsmouth	Loan
	(French Guiana) Marc-Antoine Fortuné	(England) Doncaster Rovers	Loan
11 January 2012	(England) James Hurst	(England) Chesterfield	Loan
12 January 2012	(New Zealand) Chris Wood	(England) Bristol City	Loan
	(Czech Republic) Roman Bednář	(England) Blackpool	Free
31 January 2012	(Chile) Gonzalo Jara	(England) Brighton & Hove Albion	Loan
31 January 2012	(England) Joe Mattock	(England) Brighton & Hove Albion	Loan
