= 2004–05 Charlton Athletic F.C. season =

Charlton Athletic
2004–05 season
- Manager: Alan Curbishley
- Stadium: The Valley
- FA Premier League: 11th
- FA Cup: Fifth round
- League Cup: Third round
- Top goalscorer: League: Shaun Bartlett (6); All: Shaun Bartlett (8)
- Highest home attendance: 27,104 (vs. West Bromwich Albion, 19 March 2005)
- Lowest home attendance: 24,263 (vs. Southampton, 13 September 2004)
- Average home league attendance: 26,402
Home colours	Away colours

During the 2004–05 English football season, Charlton Athletic competed in the FA Premier League. The club also competed in the FA Cup, and the League Cup.

== Season summary ==
A season after just finishing outside the European qualification spots, Charlton suffered a slight decline to finish in mid-table in a nonetheless respectable eleventh place. Charlton never looked like the team that had nearly qualified for the Champions League the previous season, but with nine games to go Charlton were still placed seventh and looked likely to replicate their seventh-place finish the previous season. Unfortunately, the usual end-of-season decline hit Charlton and they picked up only three points from those nine games, dragging the Addicks down to 11th.

Charlton's goal-shy attack was what let the team down during the season. Manager Alan Curbishley sought to solve this by signing prolific young striker Darren Bent from Championship side Ipswich Town.

== Final league table ==
Pos	Team	Pld	W	D	L	GF	GA	GD	Pts
9	Tottenham Hotspur	38	14	10	14	47	41	+6	52
10	Aston Villa	38	12	11	15	45	52	−7	47
11	Charlton Athletic	38	12	10	16	42	58	−16	46
12	Birmingham City	38	11	12	15	40	46	−6	45
13	Fulham	38	12	8	18	52	60	−8	44

Rules for classification: 1) points; 2) goal difference; 3) number of goals scored.

== Kit ==
Charlton retained the previous season's kit, manufactured by Spanish apparel manufacturer Joma and sponsored by all:sports.

== Players ==
=== First-team squad ===
Squad at end of season

Note: Flags indicate national team as defined under FIFA eligibility rules; some limited exceptions apply. Players may hold more than one non-FIFA nationality.

No.	Pos.	Nation	Player
1	GK	IRL	Dean Kiely (Note: Kiely was born in Salford, England, and represented them at U-15, U-16, and U-18 level, but also qualified to represent the Republic of Ireland internationally and made his international debut for the Republic of Ireland in November 1999.)
2	DF	ENG	Luke Young
5	DF	ENG	Chris Perry
6	DF	RSA	Mark Fish
7	DF	BUL	Radostin Kishishev
8	MF	IRL	Matt Holland (Note: Holland was born in Bury, England, but qualified to represent the Republic of Ireland internationally through his grandmother and made his debut for Republic of Ireland in 1999.) (captain)
9	FW	JAM	Jason Euell (Note: Euell was born in Lambeth, England, and represented them at U-21 level, but also qualified to represent Jamaica internationally through his father and made his international debut for Jamaica in November 2004.)
10	FW	JAM	Kevin Lisbie (Note: Lisbie was born in Hackney, England, but also qualified to represent Jamaica internationally and made his international debut for Jamaica in 2002.)
11	FW	ENG	Francis Jeffers
12	DF	ISL	Hermann Hreiðarsson
13	MF	ENG	Danny Murphy
14	MF	ENG	Jerome Thomas
15	DF	MAR	Talal El Karkouri
16	GK	DEN	Stephan Andersen

No.	Pos.	Nation	Player
17	FW	RSA	Shaun Bartlett
18	DF	ENG	Paul Konchesky
19	MF	DEN	Dennis Rommedahl
20	MF	ENG	Bryan Hughes
21	FW	FIN	Jonatan Johansson
24	DF	ENG	Jonathan Fortune
25	GK	ENG	Simon Royce
28	DF	ENG	Osei Sankofa
29	MF	IRL	Neil McCafferty (Note: McCafferty was born in Derry, Northern Ireland, but also qualified to represent the Republic of Ireland internationally and represented them at U16 and U-19 level.)
30	MF	ENG	Stacy Long
31	MF	ENG	Lloyd Sam (Note: Sam was born in Leeds, England, and represented them at U-20 level, but also qualified to represent Ghana internationally through his parents and would make his international debut for Ghana in October 2015.)
32	DF	ENG	Mark Ricketts
33	FW	ENG	Alex Varney
34	DF	ENG	Barry Fuller

=== Left club during season ===
Note: Flags indicate national team as defined under FIFA eligibility rules; some limited exceptions apply. Players may hold more than one non-FIFA nationality.

No.	Pos.	Nation	Player
3	DF	ENG	Chris Powell (to West Ham United)
4	MF	ENG	Graham Stuart (to Norwich City)
22	MF	JAM	Jamal Campbell-Ryce (Note: Campbell-Ryce was born in Lambeth, England, but also qualified to represent Jamaica internationally and made his international debut for Jamaica in 2003.) (to Rotherham United)

No.	Pos.	Nation	Player
23	DF	ENG	Michael Turner (to Brentford)
26	GK	ENG	Paul Rachubka (Note: Rachubka was born in San Luis Obispo, California, United States, but was raised in England from the age of 7, and represented them at U-16, U-18, and U-20 level.) (to Huddersfield Town)

== Transfers ==
=== In ===
- (Denmark) Stephan Andersen - (Denmark) AB £721,000, 24 May
- (England) Bryan Hughes - (England) Birmingham City, Bosman, 1 July
- (Denmark) Dennis Rommedahl - (Netherlands) PSV, £2,000,000, 1 July
- (Morocco) Talal El Karkouri - (France) Paris Saint-Germain, £1,000,000, 11 July
- (England) Danny Murphy - (England) Liverpool, £2,500,000, 10 August
- (England) Francis Jeffers - (England) Arsenal, £2,600,000, 10 August

=== Out ===
- (England) Richard Rufus - retired, 3 June
- (Portugal) Sérgio Leite - released, 7 June (later joined (Portugal) Ovarense)
- (England) Stephen Hughes - released, 7 June (later joined (England) Coventry City on 6 July)
- (England) Gary Rowett - retired, 6 July
- (Denmark) Claus Jensen - (England) Fulham, £1,250,000, 23 July
- (Italy) Paolo Di Canio - (Italy) Lazio, free, 10 August
- (England) Chris Powell - (England) West Ham United, month loan, 10 September
- (England) Michael Turner - (England) Brentford, undisclosed, 2 November
- (Jamaica) Jamal Campbell-Ryce - (England) Rotherham United, undisclosed, 26 November
- (England) Paul Rachubka - (England) Huddersfield Town, free, 6 December
- (England) Chris Powell - (England) West Ham United, free, 17 December
- (England) Graham Stuart - (England) Norwich City, undisclosed, 31 January
- Transfers in: ▼£8,821,000
- Transfers out: ▲£1,250,000
- Total spending: ▼£7,571,000

== Match summaries ==
=== Premier League ===
Charlton started their Premiership campaign at Bolton. Both teams were hoping to improve on last season's respectful positions, with Bolton finishing eighth and Charlton seventh the previous season, and to also show their European credentials, but it just looked like one team would be on today's showing. Kevin Davies was denied by Dean Kiely after just 30 seconds to show the tough day the Addicks would have. Shaun Bartlett fouled Kevin Davies and Jay-Jay Okocha, who had gone the previous season without scoring, scored an early contender for goal of the season with a rasping 30-yard free kick which left Kiely clutching thin air. It was two shortly afterwards when Okocha turned from scorer to provider as his precise through ball found Henrik Pedersen, who held off Luke Young and slotted past Kiely. Kevin Lisbie then missed a glorious chance for the visitors when from six yards out, his shot was blocked by Jussi Jääskeläinen. Charlton improved in the second half but couldn't take their chances, with Shaun Bartlett and debutant Danny Murphy missing good opportunities, and that allowed Bolton to seal the game when Okocha scored an incredible second when he teased the Charlton defenders before unleashing a powerful drive past the helpless Dean Kiely. Bartlett then cleared an Okocha free kick off the line to prevent the Nigerian an amazing hat-trick of long range strikes. Eventually, Charlton got on the score sheet when a Danny Murphy free kick was headed home by Lisbie. But it was too late for a comeback and in the end Pedersen scored his second of the day when Gary Speed played him through and the Danish striker did the rest.

Charlton bounced back from the defeat at Bolton by beating Portsmouth at home. Charlton started the brightest when, from an early corner, Jonathan Fortune headed towards goal via a deflection, forcing a good save from Shaka Hislop. Then it was Portsmouth's turn when Yakubu crossed in to the Charlton box. Dean Kiely dropped the cross to Eyal Berkovic, who took too long to get a shot out. There was a quiet period in the game until Danny Murphy got a cross in which Kevin Lisbie managed to head onto the bar. Then Lisbie turned supplier, leading to Charlton's first goal. Lisbie crossed in and Portsmouth failed to clear, allowing Jason Euell to stab the ball past Hislop. Portsmouth then almost equalised soon afterwards with another cross. This one was from Yakubu, who crossed in for Patrik Berger. He took a shot which was blocked into the path of David Unsworth who in turn shot into the side netting. Kiely preserved Charlton's lead, denying Yakubu and Berger as Charlton went in 1–0 at half time. Charlton threatened at the start of the second half with efforts from Dennis Rommedahl and Shaun Bartlett but then Portsmouth got an unbelievable equaliser. A short free kick was given to Patrik Berger, who flicked up and volleyed incredibly from approximately 35 yards out, seeing the ball fly into the top corner. Charlton were looking good after that goal and were looking to get a late goal. Rommedahl and Bartlett were both denied by Shaka Hislop, who was having a good game until the 87th minute when Jonathan Fortune swung in a free kick which glanced off David Unsworth's head. Hislop failed to gather the ball as Charlton grabbed a late winner.

Charlton then faced Aston Villa at home. Villa started the brightest. Gareth Barry, carrying on from where he left off against West Brom, delivered a dangerous cross which went to Darius Vassell, who crashed his shot against the crossbar. Charlton then had a penalty appeal turned down after Nolberto Solano clipped Dennis Rommedahl's heel, but Charlton did not need a penalty soon afterwards as a cross from Hermann Hreiðarsson found Francis Jeffers, who leapt up and headed in his first goal for his new club. Jeffers scored his second after a long ball from Radostin Kishishev wasn't dealt with by Olof Mellberg, pouncing on the ball before guiding past Thomas Sorensen. Just before half time, Sorensen dived out at Kevin Lisbie's feet, getting injured in the process; Stefan Postma came on. In a quiet second half, the only real action was a third goal for Charlton and a first Charlton goal for Luke Young. Rommedahl produced a chipped through ball which deflected off Thomas Hitzlsperger into the path of Young, who confidently finished past the on-rushing Postma.

=== Results per matchday ===
Matchday	1	2	3	4	5	6	7	8	9	10	11	12	13	14	15	16	17	18	19	20	21	22	23	24	25	26	27	28	29	30	31	32	33	34	35	36	37	38
Ground	A	H	H	A	H	A	H	A	H	A	H	A	H	A	H	A	A	H	A	H	H	A	H	A	H	A	A	A	H	H	H	A	H	A	A	H	A	H
Result	L	W	W	L	D	D	W	L	D	L	L	W	W	L	L	W	W	W	D	W	L	L	W	W	L	D	D	D	W	L	D	L	L	D	L	L	L	D
Position	19	11	4	8	10	12	8	11	11	12	11	9	10	12	10	8	7	8	7	7	7	8	7	7	7	8	9	9	7	7	8	9	10	10	11	11	11	11

Source: WorldFootball.com
A = Away; H = Home; W = Win; D = Draw; L = Loss

14 August 2004 1	Bolton Wanderers	4–1	Charlton Athletic	Bolton, Greater Manchester
	Okocha 11', 59'; Pedersen 30', 72'	Report	Lisbie 67'	Stadium: Reebok Stadium; Attendance: 24,100; Referee: Phil Dowd

21 August 2004 2	Charlton Athletic	2–1	Portsmouth	Greenwich, London
	Euell 23'; Unsworth 87' (o.g.)	Report	Berger 53'	Stadium: The Valley; Attendance: 25,204; Referee: Alan Wiley

25 August 2004 3	Charlton Athletic	3–0	Aston Villa	Greenwich, London
	Jeffers 29', 34'; Young 58'	Report		Stadium: The Valley; Attendance: 26,190; Referee: Howard Webb

28 August 2004 4	Manchester City	4–0	Charlton Athletic	Manchester
15:00	Anelka 13', 60'; Sinclair 34'; S. Wright-Phillips 78'	Report		Stadium: City of Manchester Stadium; Attendance: 43,593; Referee: Mark Halsey

13 September 2004 5	Charlton Athletic	0–0	Southampton	Greenwich, London
		Report		Stadium: The Valley; Attendance: 24,263; Referee: Neale Barry

18 September 2004 6	Birmingham City	1–1	Charlton Athletic	Birmingham, West Midlands
15:00 BST (UTC+01)	Johnson (red card) 57'; Yorke 68'	Report	Young 49'	Stadium: St Andrew's; Attendance: 27,400; Referee: Uriah Rennie

27 September 2004 7	Charlton Athletic	1–0	Blackburn Rovers	Greenwich, London
	El Karkouri 49'	Report		Stadium: The Valley; Attendance: 26,193; Referee: Steve Dunn

2 October 2004 8	Arsenal	4–0	Charlton Athletic	Islington, London
	Ljungberg 33'; Henry 48', 69'; Reyes 70'	Report		Stadium: Highbury; Attendance: 38,103; Referee: Mike Dean

17 October 2004 9	Charlton Athletic	1–1	Newcastle United	Greenwich, London
	O'Brien 51' (o.g.)	Report	Bellamy 39'	Stadium: The Valley; Attendance: 26,553; Referee: Peter Walton

23 October 2004 10	Liverpool	2–0	Charlton Athletic	Liverpool, Merseyside
	Riise 52'; Luis García 74'	Report		Stadium: Anfield; Attendance: 41,625; Referee: Andy D'Urso

30 October 2004 35	Charlton Athletic	1–2	Middlesbrough	Greenwich, London
BST (UTC+01)	Johansson 46'	Report	El Karkouri 21' (o.g.); Zenden 58'	Stadium: The Valley; Attendance: 26,031; Referee: Mark Halsey

6 November 2004 11	Tottenham Hotspur	2–3	Charlton Athletic	Haringey, London
	Keane 69' (pen.); Defoe 79'	Report	Bartlett 17', 39' (red card) 68'; Thomas 50'	Stadium: White Hart Lane; Attendance: 35,423; Referee: Neal Barry

13 November 2004 12	Charlton Athletic	4–0	Norwich City	Greenwich, London
15:00 GMT	Johansson 15', 21'; Konchesky 75'; Euell 88'	Report		Stadium: The Valley; Attendance: 27,057; Referee: Andre Marriner

20 November 2004 13	Manchester United	2–0	Charlton Athletic	Trafford, Greater Manchester
	Young 40' (o.g.); Scholes 50'	Report		Stadium: Old Trafford; Referee: Rob Styles

27 November 2004 14	Charlton Athletic	0–4	Chelsea	Greenwich, London
		Report	Duff 4'; Terry 47', 50'; Guðjohnsen 59'	Stadium: The Valley; Attendance: 26,355; Referee: Mark Clattenburg

5 December 2004 15	Crystal Palace	0–1	Charlton Athletic	Croydon, London
		Report	Rommedahl 90'	Stadium: Selhurst Park; Attendance: 20,705; Referee: Matt Messias

11 December 2004 16	West Bromwich Albion	0–1	Charlton Athletic	West Bromwich, West Midlands
		Report	Holland 30'	Stadium: The Hawthorns; Attendance: 24,697; Referee: Chris Foy

20 December 2004 17	Charlton Athletic	2–1	Fulham	Greenwich, London
	Thomas 27'; El Karkouri 66'	Report	Radzinski 82'	Stadium: The Valley; Attendance: 26,108; Referee: Steve Bennett

26 December 2004 18	Southampton	0–0	Charlton Athletic	Southampton, Hampshire
		Report		Stadium: St Mary's Stadium; Referee: Steve Dunn

28 December 2004 19	Charlton Athletic	2–0	Everton	Greenwich, London
	El Karkouri 82'; Hreiðarsson 85'	Report	Ferguson (red card)	Stadium: The Valley; Attendance: 27,001; Referee: Mike Riley

1 January 2005 20	Charlton Athletic	1–3	Arsenal	Greenwich, London
	El Karkouri 45'	Report	Ljungberg 35', 48'; Van Persie 67'	Stadium: The Valley; Referee: Mark Halsey

3 January 2005 21	Blackburn Rovers	1–0	Charlton Athletic	Blackburn, Lancashire
	Emerton 41'	Report		Stadium: Ewood Park; Attendance: 19,819; Referee: Alan Wiley

15 January 2005 22	Charlton Athletic	3–1	Birmingham City	Greenwich, London
15:00 GMT (UTC)	El Karkouri 9'; Bartlett 67'; Murphy 75'	Report	Melchiot 55'	Stadium: The Valley; Attendance: 26,111; Referee: Chris Foy

22 January 2005 23	Everton	0–1	Charlton Athletic	Liverpool, Merseyside
		Report	Holland 45'	Stadium: Goodison Park; Attendance: 36,041; Referee: Howard Webb

1 February 2005 24	Charlton Athletic	1–2	Liverpool	Greenwich, London
	Bartlett 20'	Report	Morientes 61'; Riise 79'	Stadium: The Valley; Attendance: 27,102; Referee: Neale Barry

5 February 2005 25	Newcastle United	1–1	Charlton Athletic	Newcastle upon Tyne, Tyneside
	Dyer 22'	Report	Rommedahl 53'	Stadium: St James' Park; Attendance: 51,114; Referee: Mark Halsey

27 February 2005 26	Middlesbrough	2–2	Charlton Athletic	Middlesbrough, North Yorkshire
	Riggott 74'; Graham 86'	Report	Holland 14'; Bartlett 80'	Stadium: Riverside Stadium; Attendance: 29,603; Referee: Mike Riley

16 March 2005 27	Charlton Athletic	2–0	Tottenham Hotspur	Greenwich, London
	Thomas 4'; Murphy 85'	Report		Stadium: The Valley; Attendance: 26,870; Referee: Chris Foy

19 March 2005 28	Charlton Athletic	1–4	West Bromwich Albion	Greenwich, London
	Johansson 24'; El Karkouri (red card) 29'	Report	Horsfield 9'; Earnshaw 73', 84', 90' (pen.)	Stadium: The Valley; Attendance: 27,104; Referee: Mark Halsey

2 April 2005 29	Charlton Athletic	2–2	Manchester City	Greenwich, London
12:45	Bartlett 10'; Perry 90+2'	Report	Hreiðarsson 4' (o.g.); Fowler 38'	Stadium: The Valley; Attendance: 26,436; Referee: Rob Styles

5 March 2005 30	Fulham	0–0	Charlton Athletic	Fulham, London
		Report		Stadium: Craven Cottage; Attendance: 18,290; Referee: Steve Bennett

9 April 2005 31	Portsmouth	4–2	Charlton Athletic	Portsmouth, Hampshire
BST (UTC+01)	Yakubu 3'; Stone 20'; Kamara 83'; LuaLua 90'	Report	Fortune 22'; Murphy 45'	Stadium: Fratton Park; Attendance: 20,108; Referee: Graham Poll

16 April 2005 32	Charlton Athletic	1–2	Bolton Wanderers	Greenwich, London
	Jeffers 29'	Report	Okocha 7' (pen.); Diouf 58'	Stadium: The Valley; Attendance: 26,708; Referee: Alan Wiley

20 April 2005 33	Aston Villa	0–0	Charlton Athletic	Birmingham, West Midlands
		Report		Stadium: Villa Park; Attendance: 31,312; Referee: Barry Knight

23 April 2005 34	Norwich City	1–0	Charlton Athletic	Norwich, Norfolk
15:00 BST (UTC+01)	Svensson 88'	Report		Stadium: Carrow Road; Attendance: 25,459; Referee: Martin Atkinson

1 May 2005 36	Charlton Athletic	0–4	Manchester United	Greenwich, London
BST (UTC+01)	Perry (red card)	Report	Scholes; Fletcher; Smith; Rooney	Stadium: The Valley

7 May 2005 37	Chelsea	1–0	Charlton Athletic	Fulham, London
BST (UTC+01)	Makélélé 90'	Report		Stadium: Stamford Bridge; Attendance: 42,065; Referee: Mike Riley

15 May 2005 38	Charlton Athletic	2–2	Crystal Palace	Greenwich, London
BST (UTC+01)	Hughes 30'; Fortune 82'	Report	Freedman 58'; Johnson 71' (pen.)	Stadium: The Valley; Attendance: 26,870; Referee: Mark Clattenburg

=== FA Cup ===
6 January 2005 1	Charlton Athletic	4–1	Rochdale	Charlton
	Hughes 19' (56); Jonathan 44'; Murphy 64'	https://news.bbc.co.uk/sport2/hi/football/fa_cup/4139393.stm Report]	Holt 51'	Stadium: The Valley; Attendance: 13,955; Referee: Richard Beeby

29 January 2005 2	Charlton Athletic	3–2	Yeovil Town	Charlton
15:00 GMT	Hughes 37'; Jeffers 51'; Bartlett 57'	Report	Paul Terry 44'; Arron Davies 66'	Stadium: The Valley; Attendance: 22, 873; Referee: Rob Styles

19 February 2005 3	Charlton Athletic	1–2	Leicester City	Charlton
15:00 GMT	Bartlett 45'	Report	Dabizas 38'; Dion Dublin 90'	Stadium: The Valley; Attendance: 23,719

=== League Cup ===
- 21 September 2004: Grimsby Town 0–2 Charlton Athletic
- 27 October 2004: Charlton Athletic 1–2 Crystal Palace
