= Richard Pacquette =

Association football player

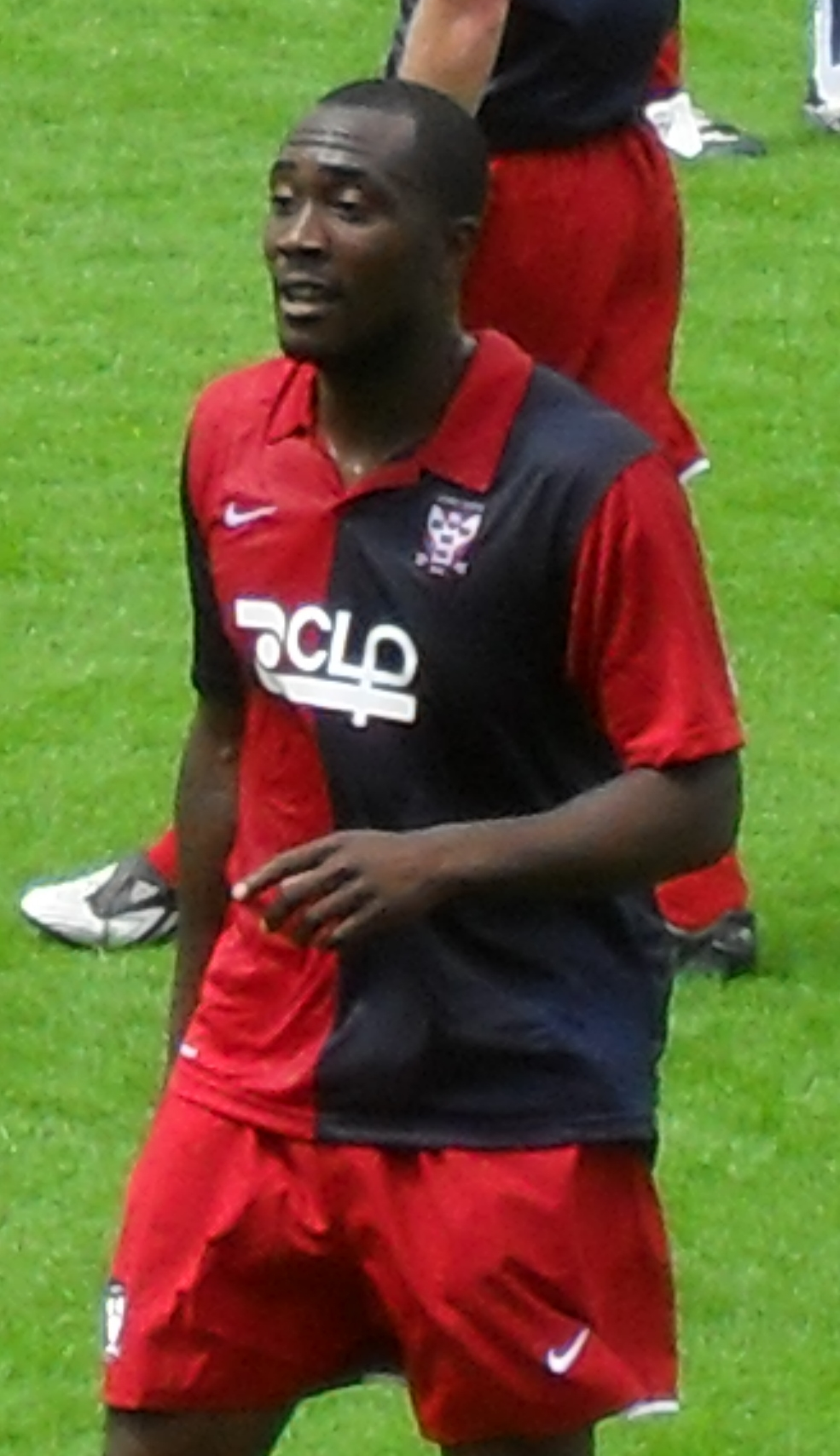
- Pacquette playing for York City in 2009

Personal information
- Full name: Richard Francis Pacquette
- Date of birth: 28 January 1983 (age 43)
- Place of birth: Kilburn, England
- Height: 6 ft 0 in (1.83 m)
- Position: Striker

Team information
- Current team: Harefield United (player-manager)

Youth career
- 199?–2000: Queens Park Rangers

Senior career*
Years	Team	Apps	(Gls)
2000–2004	Queens Park Rangers	31	(6)
2002–2003	→ Stevenage Borough (loan)	7	(2)
2003–2004	→ Dagenham & Redbridge (loan)	3	(1)
2004	→ Mansfield Town (loan)	5	(1)
2004	Milton Keynes Dons	5	(0)
2004	Fisher Athletic	?	(?)
2004	Brentford	1	(0)
2004–2005	Farnborough Town	5	(1)
2005	Stevenage Borough	1	(0)
2005	St Albans City	1	(0)
2005	Hemel Hempstead Town	2	(0)
2005	Hampton & Richmond Borough	6	(0)
2005–2006	Worthing	30	(17)
2006	→ Thurrock (loan)	4	(0)
2006–2008	Havant & Waterlooville	66	(22)
2008	→ Maidenhead United (loan)	5	(3)
2008–2009	Maidenhead United	32	(20)
2009	→ Histon (loan)	3	(0)
2009–2010	York City	13	(1)
2010–2011	Eastbourne Borough	33	(10)
2011	Hayes & Yeading United	18	(4)
2011	Maidenhead United	3	(3)
2012	Lincoln City	13	(3)
2012	Bromley	13	(5)
2012–2013	Eastleigh	2	(1)
2013	Sutton United	7	(1)
2013–2014	Maidenhead United	44	(15)
2014–2015	Eastbourne Borough	35	(8)
2015–2016	Hampton & Richmond Borough	11	(2)
2015	→ Lewes (loan)	6	(0)
2016	Walton & Hersham	5	(3)
2016	Hampton & Richmond Borough	0	(0)
2016	Metropolitan Police	7	(1)
2016	Grays Athletic	4	(0)
2016–2017	Egham Town		
2017	Harrow Borough	10	(0)
2017–2018	Thamesmead Town	26	(9)
2018–2023	Harefield United	78	(56)
2023–2025	Amersham Town	24	(9)
2025–	Harefield United	4	(0)

International career^{‡}
2008	Dominica	2	(1)

Managerial career
- 2025–: Harefield United
- * Club domestic league appearances and goals as of 18:45, 17 December 2025 (UTC) ‡ National team caps and goals as of 17:50, 9 November 2015 (UTC)

Richard Francis Pacquette (born 28 January 1983) is a semi-professional footballer and manager who plays as a striker and is currently player-manager for Harefield United. He has played in the Football League for Queens Park Rangers, Mansfield Town, Milton Keynes Dons and Brentford, and at senior international level for the Dominica national team.

Pacquette started his career with Queens Park Rangers and made his first-team debut towards the end of the 2000–01 season. He had loan spells with Stevenage Borough, Dagenham & Redbridge and Mansfield Town before being released in 2004, having made over 40 appearances. He had brief spells with Milton Keynes Dons and Brentford before dropping down to non-League football, where he has played since. Following short spells at five different clubs, he played for Worthing for a season and scored 17 goals. He scored for Havant & Waterlooville in their FA Cup fourth round match against Liverpool at Anfield in 2008, where they were defeated 5–2.

Born in Kilburn, London to Dominican parents, Pacquette has played internationally for the Dominica national team. He scored on his debut against Barbados in 2008 and has earned two caps for the team. His second appearance came in a defeat to Barbados in the second leg.

== Club career ==
Born in Kilburn, Greater London, to Dominican parents, Pacquette's first club was Queens Park Rangers (QPR) where he played in the same youth team as Peter Crouch. He turned professional on 1 February 2000 and made his first-team debut as a 77th-minute substitute in a 2–1 defeat to Huddersfield Town on 21 April 2001. He made one further appearance in the 2000–01 season, with a start in a 3–0 defeat to Stockport County. The season finished with QPR's relegation to the Second Division, and Pacquette scored his first goal for the club in a 3–0 victory over Bury on 12 January 2002. He scored his second, and final goal of the 2001–02 season, to give QPR the lead in a 1–1 draw with Cardiff City in March, but was later handed a red card. After the end of the season, in July, manager Ian Holloway placed him on the transfer list.

After having made four appearances and scored one goal for QPR during the 2002–03 season, he joined Football Conference club Stevenage Borough on a three-month loan on 18 October. He made his debut the following day in a 1–0 defeat to Burton Albion and scored in his next appearance, in a 2–1 victory over Swansea City in the Football League Trophy first round. He went on to score for Stevenage in the southern section second round of the Football League Trophy, which finished in a 4–3 defeat to Luton Town. He finished the loan spell having scored four goals in 10 appearances. After returning to QPR, he scored three goals in the league and featured for them in both legs of the Second Division play-off semi-final, as well as the final, which was lost 1–0 to Cardiff at the Millennium Stadium.

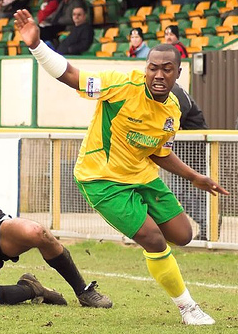
Pacquette playing for Thurrock in 2006

Pacquette scored on his first appearance of the 2003–04 season, in a 2–0 victory over Kidderminster Harriers in the Football League Trophy in October 2003. He featured against Dagenham & Redbridge in the Football League Trophy in November, which proved to be his final appearance for QPR. He later joined Dagenham on loan on 29 December and made his debut in a 2–1 defeat to Aldershot Town on 1 January 2004. He scored his first goal for Dagenham in a 5–0 victory over Shrewsbury Town and finished loan the spell with five appearances and two goals. He joined Mansfield Town in the Third Division on a one-month loan on 4 February. He made his debut in a 3–0 defeat to Rochdale and scored in the following match, which finished as a 2–1 victory over York City. He finished the loan spell at Mansfield with five appearances and one goal, and after the end of the season, in June, he was released by QPR after not being offered a new contract.

He trained with newly formed League One club Milton Keynes Dons (MK Dons) and joined them on 24 September. Pacquette made his debut in a 4–2 victory over Hartlepool United and scored his first goal in his following match, a 3–0 victory over Brentford in the Football League Trophy. After making seven appearances for MK Dons, he was released in November, and subsequently signed for Southern League Division One East club Fisher Athletic later that month. He left the club to sign for Brentford in League One on non-contract terms on 26 November. He played for Brentford in a 2–0 defeat to Hull City. He left the club by mutual consent and signed for Conference National club Farnborough Town on 7 December. His debut came in a 1–1 draw with Canvey Island and his first goal came in a 2–1 defeat to Morecambe.

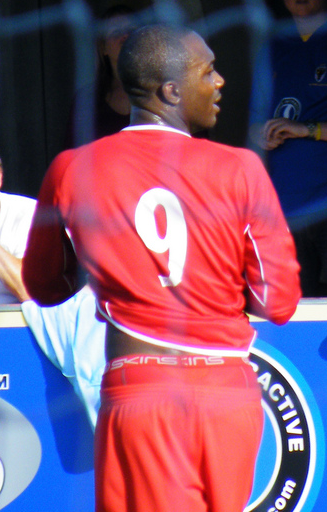
Pacquette playing for Maidenhead United in 2008

After making five appearances for Farnborough, he rejoined Stevenage on non-contract terms, after training with Grimsby Town. He made two appearances for Stevenage, and after failing to earn a long-term contract he had another trial at Grimsby. He eventually joined St Albans City in February, where he made one appearance before signing for Hemel Hempstead Town in March. After making two appearances, he soon moved on after joining Isthmian League Premier Division club Hampton & Richmond Borough 10 days later. He made six appearances for Hampton before the end of the 2004–05 season. He joined Worthing after a trial in July 2005, and was loaned to Thurrock of the Conference South in February 2006, where he made four appearances after making his debut in a 1–0 defeat to Yeading. Before this loan, he was transfer-listed by Worthing, and in March he was released by the club, after scoring 17 goals in 30 appearances during the 2005–06 season.

After leaving Worthing, Pacquette joined Conference South club Havant & Waterlooville in March, scoring three goals in eight league appearances during the remainder of the 2005–06 season. He scored his first goal of the 2006–07 season in a 2–0 victory over Dorchester Town on 11 September. He scored two goals for Havant in their 3–0 victory over Team Bath in the FA Trophy third qualifying round, which saw them progress to the first round. He played in both legs of Havant's play-off semi-final defeat to Braintree Town, finishing the season with 41 appearances and 13 goals. Following the end of the season, he signed a new contract with Havant in June 2007. He scored for Havant in their FA Cup fourth round tie against Premier League team Liverpool at Anfield on 26 January 2008, putting Havant 1–0 in the lead on eight minutes, before they eventually lost 5–2.

On transfer deadline day, 31 March 2008, Pacquette joined rival Conference South club Maidenhead United on loan until the end of the 2007–08 season, after making 32 appearances and scoring 13 goals for Havant up to that point during the 2007–08 season. He made five appearances and scored three goals for Maidenhead before the end of the season, and signed for the club permanently during the summer. He signed for Conference Premier club Histon on a one-month loan on 18 February 2009, after having made 25 appearances and scored 15 goals for Maidenhead up to that point during the 2008–09 season. He made his debut for Histon as a 75th-minute substitute against Eastbourne Borough on 21 February 2009. He started the following match, a 2–0 victory over Barrow, before making his final appearance as an 83rd-minute substitute in a 3–0 victory against Lewes. He was an unused substitute for the following four matches before he finished the loan spell at Histon with three appearances. He finished the 2008–09 season with 32 appearances and 20 goals for Maidenhead.

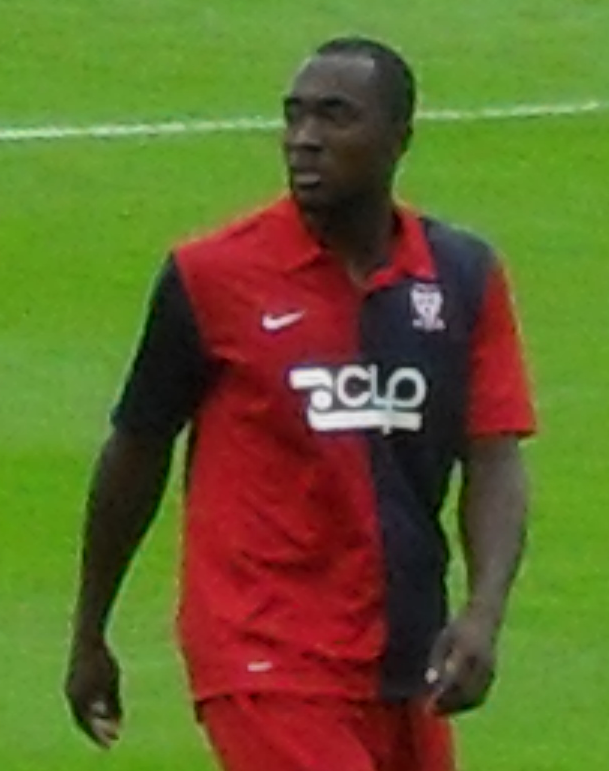
Pacquette playing for York City in 2009

At the end of the season, Pacquette signed for Conference Premier club York City on 22 May 2009. After being unavailable for the opening three matches of the season due to a suspension he received while at Maidenhead, he made his debut as a 78th-minute substitute against Hayes & Yeading United, scoring York's equaliser with a header in a 1–1 draw. He was sent off 56 minutes into his first start for York in the following match against Gateshead, which resulted in him serving another three-match suspension. He made his return as an 82nd-minute substitute in a 3–2 victory over Tamworth in October. He later pulled a thigh muscle, meaning he was expected to be out injured for the remainder of the month, eventually returning to training in November. His return came in a 3–2 victory over Crewe Alexandra in the FA Cup first round, coming on as an 84th-minute substitute, before scoring to equalise the match at 2–2. He scored the winning goal in an FA Trophy second round replay against Newport County in stoppage time on 26 January 2010. He scored York's goal in a 2–1 defeat in the FA Trophy quarter-final against Barrow on 2 March. He finished the 2009–10 season with 18 appearances and four goals for York and the club announced that he would be released when his contract expired.

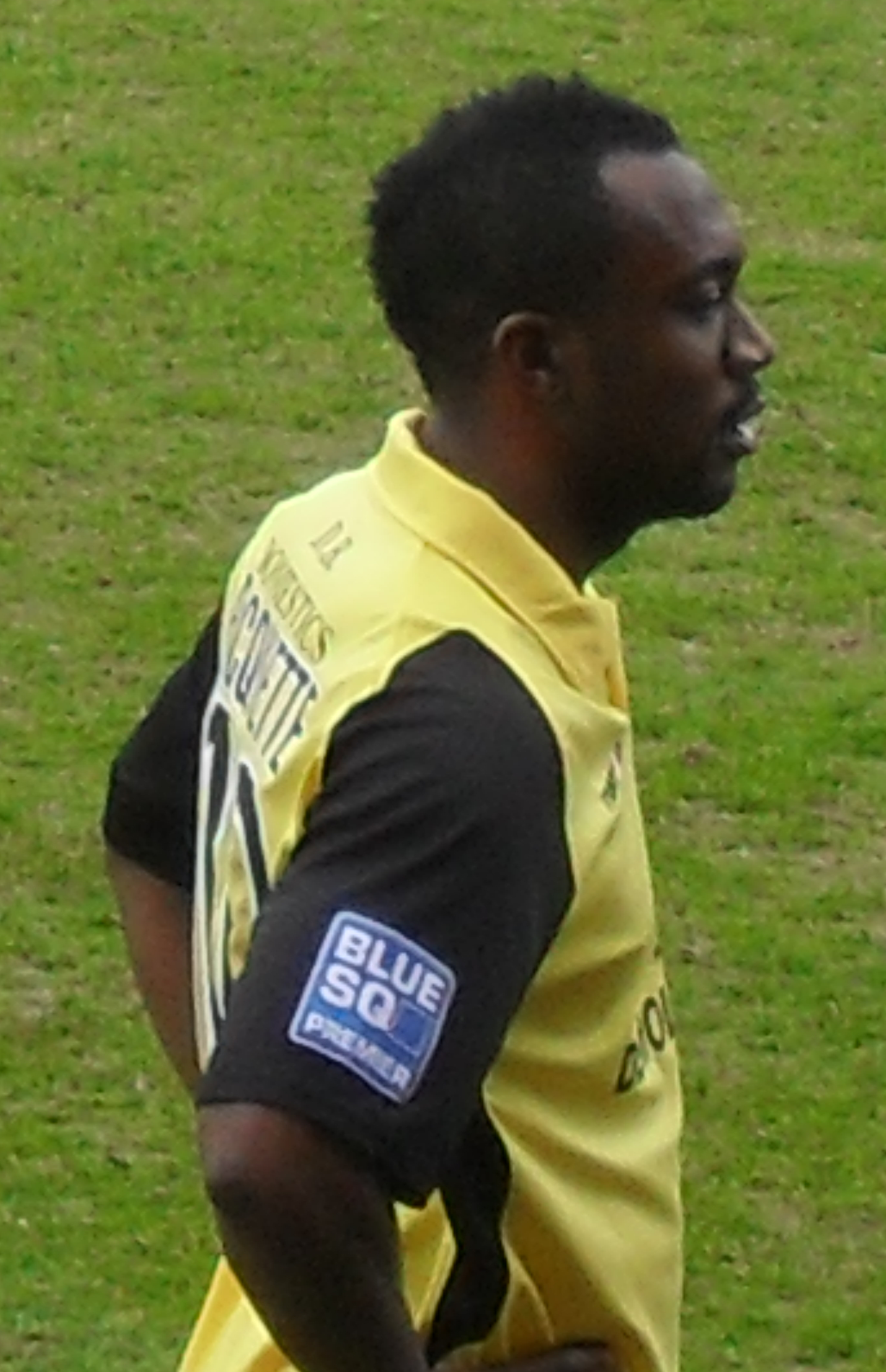
Pacquette playing for Eastbourne Borough in 2011

Pacquette signed for Conference Premier club Eastbourne Borough on a one-year contract on 28 June. He made his debut in the opening match of the 2010–11 season, a 4–2 defeat away to Tamworth on 14 August, and he scored Eastbourne's first goal with a header. Pacquette finished the season with 14 goals in 39 appearances as Eastbourne were relegated to the Conference South. He was not offered a new contract by the club after indicating that he wished to leave and later went on trial with former club Maidenhead.

At the start of August 2011 Pacquette joined Forest Green Rovers on trial and featured in a match against Cirencester Town but failed to land a deal. Later that month, Pacquette joined Conference Premier club Hayes & Yeading United. He was released by Hayes on 9 December, later that day re-signing for Maidenhead of the Conference South. He made his second debut for the club in a goalless draw with Staines Town in the FA Trophy first round, and also appeared in the replay defeat three days later. He would go on to score three goals in the next three matches, all in the Conference South. Just a month after joining Maidenhead he returned to the Conference Premier after signing for Lincoln City on a contract until the end of the 2011–12 season.

He joined Gainsborough Trinity on trial in August 2012 and scored in the team's 4–0 pre-season victory over Doncaster Rovers. He signed for Conference South club Bromley on 16 August 2012 and made his debut two days later in a 0–0 draw at home to Staines Town. He scored his first two goals for the club on 25 August 2012 in a 3–2 defeat at Chelmsford City. Pacquette was released by Bromley in December 2012, and promptly joined fellow Conference South club Eastleigh. He scored on his debut, a 5–3 a defeat at Salisbury City on 1 January 2013, but was subsequently released on 10 January 2013, after scoring once in two matches for the club. He signed for another Conference South club, Sutton United, on 19 January 2012. Pacquette's debut came in a 2–1 home win over Eastleigh on 2 February 2013, before scoring his first goal in a 3–2 victory at home to Basingstoke Town on 19 February. He was released by Sutton on 6 March 2013, having scored once in seven matches for the club.

Pacquette returned to Conference South club Maidenhead on 7 March 2013 on a contract until the end of the 2013–14 season, making his third debut on 9 March in a 2–0 home defeat to Eastleigh. In June 2014 he left Maidenhead to rejoin Eastbourne Borough of the Conference South.

During the summer of 2015, he made preseason appearances for Hampton & Richmond Borough, scoring a goal against Tooting & Mitcham United on 12 July 2015, and later signed for them. He went on a loan stint at Lewes in November 2015, and after a spell with Walton & Hersham winter 2016, he was back in the Hampton & Richmond Borough jersey on 22 March 2016 as they narrowly lost to Cockfosters in a 42 penalty shoot out thriller in the Middlesex Senior Charity Cup. In July 2016, Metropolitan Police manager Jim Cooper announced his arrival. Pacquette went on to sign for fellow Isthmian League Premier Division club Grays Athletic on 20 October. Following his release on 17 November 2016, he made his debut for Egham Town on 3 December 2016. In June 2017, Pacquette joined Isthmian League Premier Division club Harrow Borough.

In November 2017 he joined Thamesmead Town. Following the club going into creditors voluntary administration in October 2018, he signed for Harefield United of Spartan South Midlands League Division One.

In May 2023, he joined Amersham Town as player-assistant manager

In July 2025, he became player-manager of Harefield United. He made his debut for the club on 5 August, in a 3–2 FA Cup win over Peacehaven & Telscombe, scoring his first goal several weeks later in a 1–2 defeat in the FA Vase to Rushden & Higham United.

== International career ==
Pacquette earned a call-up to the Dominica national team for the 2010 FIFA World Cup qualification CONCACAF first round match against Barbados on 6 February 2008. Barbados went into the match as heavy favourites but fell behind to Pacquette's goal on his international debut, which finished as a 1–1 draw. After making his debut, manager Christopher Ericson said "He is great in front of goal, powerful and full of effort and work. I only hope that we can get him some more support up front in the next game – if we do I am sure we can win it". He also played in the 1–0 defeat in the second leg on 26 March.

== Style of play ==
After signing for York City in 2009, manager Martin Foyle described him as being "strong and can hold the ball up, which we were poor at doing last season. He could be our link man because we need to retain possession better in the final third."

== Personal life ==
He attended Cardinal Hinsley Maths and Computing College when he was young. His cousin is fellow Dominica international footballer Jefferson Louis, with whom he was paired as Dominica's strikers in the second leg against Barbados. During his time as a semi-professional Pacquette worked as a school caretaker and a truancy officer. Pacquette and his Havant & Waterlooville teammates would have received £10,000 each if they had beaten Liverpool in the FA Cup. After joining York City in 2009, he moved into a house with teammates Neil Barrett, Alex Lawless, James Meredith and Daniel Parslow.

Like his cousin, Pacquette is known to be an Arsenal supporter.

Pacquette is now a PE Teacher at Newman Catholic College.

== Career statistics ==
=== Club ===
As of match played 5 September 2015

Appearances and goals by club, season and competition
Club	Season	League			FA Cup		League Cup		Other		Total	
Club	Season	Division	Apps	Goals	Apps	Goals	Apps	Goals	Apps	Goals	Apps	Goals
Queens Park Rangers	2000–01	First Division	2	0	0	0	0	0	—		2	0
Queens Park Rangers	2001–02	Second Division	16	2	1	0	1	0	1 (Note: Appearance(s) in Football League Trophy)	0	19	2
Queens Park Rangers	2002–03	Second Division	11	4	0	0	1	0	3 (Note: Appearances in Second Division play-offs)	0	15	4
Queens Park Rangers	2003–04	Second Division	2	0	0	0	1	0	2	1	5	1
Queens Park Rangers	Total		31	6	1	0	3	0	6	1	41	7
Stevenage Borough (loan)	2002–03	Football Conference	7	2	1	0	—		2	2	10	4
Dagenham & Redbridge (loan)	2003–04	Football Conference	3	1	0	0	—		2 (Note: Appearance(s) in FA Trophy)	1	5	2
Mansfield Town (loan)	2003–04	Third Division	5	1	0	0	0	0	0	0	5	1
Milton Keynes Dons	2004–05	League One	5	0	0	0	0	0	2	1	7	1
Brentford	2004–05	League One	1	0	0	0	0	0	0	0	1	0
Farnborough Town	2004–05	Conference National	5	1	0	0	—		0	0	5	1
Stevenage Borough	2004–05	Conference National	1	0	0	0	—		1	0	2	0
St Albans City	2004–05	Conference South	1	0	0	0	—		0	0	1	0
Hemel Hempstead Town	2004–05	Southern League Premier Division	2	0	0	0	—		0	0	2	0
Hampton & Richmond Borough	2004–05	Isthmian League Premier Division	6	0	0	0	—		0	0	6	0
Worthing	2005–06	Isthmian League Premier Division	30	17	0	0	—		0	0	30	17
Thurrock (loan)	2005–06	Conference South	4	0	0	0	—		0	0	4	0
Havant & Waterlooville	2005–06	Conference South	8	3	0	0	—		0	0	8	3
Havant & Waterlooville	2006–07	Conference South	36	11	2	0	—		3 (Note: One appearance and one goal in FA Trophy, two appearances in Conference South play-offs)	2	41	13
Havant & Waterlooville	2007–08	Conference South	22	8	8	4	—		2 (Note: One appearance in Conference League Cup, one appearance and one goal in FA Trophy)	1	32	13
Havant & Waterlooville	Total		66	22	10	4	—		5	3	81	29
Maidenhead United (loan)	2007–08	Conference South	5	3	0	0	—		0	0	5	3
Maidenhead United	2008–09	Conference South	32	20	1	0	—		0	0	33	20
Maidenhead United	Total		37	23	1	0	—		0	0	38	23
Histon (loan)	2008–09	Conference Premier	3	0	0	0	—		0	0	3	0
York City	2009–10	Conference Premier	13	1	1	1	—		4	2	18	4
Eastbourne Borough	2010–11	Conference Premier	33	10	1	0	—		5	4	39	14
Hayes & Yeading United	2011–12	Conference Premier	18	4	1	0	—		0	0	19	4
Maidenhead United	2011–12	Conference South	3	3	0	0	—		2	0	5	3
Lincoln City	2011–12	Conference Premier	13	3	0	0	—		0	0	13	3
Bromley	2012–13	Conference South	12	5	3	2	—		2	0	17	7
Eastleigh	2012–13	Conference South	2	1	0	0	—		0	0	2	1
Sutton United	2012–13	Conference South	7	1	0	0	—		0	0	7	1
Maidenhead United	2012–13	Conference South	11	5	0	0	—		0	0	11	5
Maidenhead United	2013–14	Conference South	33	10	0	0	—		2	1	35	11
Maidenhead United	Total		44	15	0	0	—		2	1	46	16
Eastbourne Borough	2014–15	Conference South	35	8	2	0	—		0	0	37	8
Hampton & Richmond Borough	2015–16	Isthmian League Premier Division	5	0	0	0	—		1 (Note: Appearance in Isthmian League Cup)	0	6	0
Career total			392	124	21	7	3	0	34	15	450	146

=== International ===
As of match played 26 March 2008

Appearances and goals by national team and year
National team	Year	Apps	Goals
Dominica	2008	2	1
Total		2	1

As of match played 6 February 2008. Dominica score listed first, score column indicates score after each Pacquette goal.

International goals by date, venue, cap, opponent, score, result and competition
No.	Date	Venue	Cap	Opponent	Score	Result	Competition	Ref
1	6 February 2008	Windsor Park, Roseau, Dominica	1	Barbados	1–0	1–1	2010 FIFA World Cup qualification	

== Honours ==
Harefield United

- Spartan South Midlands Football League Division One: 2018–19
