= Newman Catholic College =

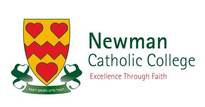

Location
- Harlesden Road; London, NW10 3RN; England; 51.5378°N 0.2386°W

Information
- Type: Voluntary aided school
- Religious affiliation: Roman Catholic
- Established: 1958
- Local authority: Brent
- Department for Education URN: 101564 Tables
- Ofsted: Reports
- Chair of Governors: Paul O'Shea
- Headteacher: Marius Carney
- Gender: Boys (rarely girls)
- Age: 11 to 19
- Enrolment: 707
- Website: https://www.ncc.brent.sch.uk

Newman Catholic College (formerly Cardinal Hinsley Maths and Computing College) is an all-boys Catholic school, located in the London Borough of Brent. The school has a student age range of 11–19 years old and is Voluntary Aided. Newman College (before the name change) was founded in 1958. Half of the school's students have English as a second language. Newman Catholic College also was one of the first Schools in London to obtain the School of Sanctuary Award on the 19th of June 2019. In May 2024 the school war rated 'outstanding' by Catholic Schools Inspectorate as it was in 2017.

== Notable staff ==
- Mohamed Mohamud Ibrahim, Deputy Prime Minister of Somalia
- Richard Pacquette, semi-professional footballer, QPR, Mansfield Town & Dominica

== Notable alumni ==
- Cyrille Regis (1958–2018) - professional footballer, West Bromwich Albion F.C., Coventry City F.C. & England
- Bashy/Ashley Thomas (b. 1985) - actor and rapper
- Otis Roberts (b. 1968) - footballer, Crystal Palace, Harrow Borough & Grenada
- Dave Regis (b. 1964) - professional footballer, Notts County, Stoke City, Plymouth Argyle & Southend United
- Richard Pacquette (b. 1983) - semi-professional footballer, QPR, Mansfield Town & Dominica
