= Jerome Thomas =

English footballer

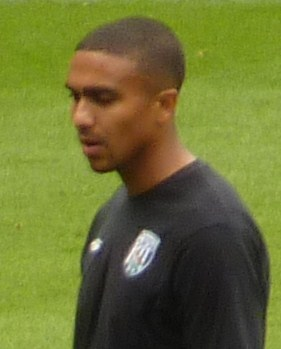
- Thomas pictured in September 2009

Personal information
- Full name: Jerome William Thomas
- Date of birth: 23 March 1983 (age 43)
- Place of birth: Brent, England
- Height: 1.78 m (5 ft 10 in)
- Positions: Winger; forward

Youth career
- Luton Town
- Arsenal

Senior career*
Years	Team	Apps	(Gls)
2001–2004	Arsenal	0	(0)
2002	→ Queens Park Rangers (loan)	4	(1)
2002	→ Queens Park Rangers (loan)	6	(2)
2004–2008	Charlton Athletic	103	(7)
2008	→ Portsmouth (loan)	1	(0)
2008–2009	Portsmouth	2	(0)
2009–2013	West Bromwich Albion	99	(11)
2012–2013	→ Leeds United (loan)	6	(1)
2013–2015	Crystal Palace	10	(0)
2016	Rotherham United	6	(0)
2016–2017	Port Vale	23	(1)
Total		260	(23)

International career
2000	England U17	1	(0)
2002	England U19	4	(1)
2002–2003	England U20	9	(0)
2005	England U21	2	(1)
- * Club domestic league appearances and goals

Jerome William Thomas (born 23 March 1983) is an English former footballer who is the head of academy recruitment at Premier League club Brighton & Hove Albion. He played predominantly as a left-winger during his career. He scored 25 goals in 292 league and cup appearances throughout a 16-year professional career in the English Football League and Premier League.

He began his career with Arsenal but never broke into the first-team despite winning two FA Youth Cup titles with the youth team and being capped up to England under-21 level. He had two loan spells with Queens Park Rangers before he was sold to Charlton Athletic for £100,000 in February 2004. He played 70 Premier League games for the club before Charlton were relegated at the end of the 2006–07 campaign. He was sold to Portsmouth in August 2008 but only played three first-team games for the club. He signed with West Bromwich Albion in August 2009 and helped the club win promotion out of the Championship at the end of the 2009–10 season. Having lost his first-team place for the 2012–13 season, he spent six weeks on loan at Leeds United before he joined Crystal Palace on a free transfer in July 2013. He played just ten Premier League games throughout two seasons before he joined Rotherham United in February 2016, following six months spent as a free agent. He signed with Port Vale in July 2016 and spent one season with the club.

== Club career ==
=== Arsenal ===
Thomas played schoolboy football for Luton Town, before joining Arsenal. He helped the Arsenal youth team to win the FA Youth Cup twice. These victories came in 2000 against Coventry City and in 2001, where he scored a goal in the final over Blackburn Rovers.

He was loaned out to Second Division side Queens Park Rangers in the 2001–02 and 2002–03 seasons. He made his debut in the English Football League on 30 March 2002, in a 3–2 win over Tranmere Rovers at Prenton Park. He scored his first professional goal on 6 April, the only goal of the game against Swindon Town at the County Ground in a 1–0 win for QPR. During his second loan spell in October 2002, he scored long-distance goals away at Cheltenham Town and against Oldham Athletic at Loftus Road. However, he found it difficult to break into the first-team at Highbury with Freddie Ljungberg and Robert Pires at the peak of their powers, and Thomas made just three appearances in the 2003–04 season – all in the League Cup. After Arsène Wenger signed José Antonio Reyes in January 2004, Thomas turned down a new one-year contract with the "Gunners" and decided it was best to look for first-team football elsewhere.

=== Charlton Athletic ===
Thomas was signed by Premier League club Charlton Athletic on a two-and-a-half-year contract for a £100,000 fee in February 2004. He had been spotted by manager Alan Curbishley playing for Arsenal reserves. He played just 45 minutes for the "Addicks" in the 2003–04 season, coming on for Paul Konchesky at half-time during a 2–2 home draw that relegated opponents Leicester City.

He scored his first top-flight goal in a 3–2 win over Tottenham Hotspur at White Hart Lane on 6 November, a game in which he was described as "a constant outlet on the left" and also provided Shaun Bartlett with an assist. He scored with a curling shot from 23 yards (21 m) out in the return game against Spurs on 16 March, which gave Charlton a 2–0 victory and finished the 2004–05 season with three goals in 24 league appearances. He made 31 league and cup appearances in the 2005–06 campaign, though scored just one goal, again against Tottenham at White Hart Lane, though this time it was a consolation goal in a 3–1 defeat.

He signed a new three-year contract after Iain Dowie was installed as manager in the summer of 2006 and defended Dowie after the club's poor start to the season, saying, "I laugh at people when they talk about relegation. There's no way we will go down." Dowie was sacked in November 2006, and new manager Les Reed told Thomas he was not needed at The Valley. However, Reed's reign would prove even shorter than Dowie's. New manager Alan Pardew returned Thomas to the starting eleven but could not steer the club away from relegation at the end of the 2006–07 season. He featured 33 times in the 2007–08 campaign as Charlton finished 11th in the Championship.

=== Portsmouth ===
In August 2008, he joined Premier League club Portsmouth on an initial season-long loan, which was made into a permanent transfer for an undisclosed fee after only six days. Chief executive Peter Storrie stated that "It frees up a loan space for us" and said that the fee would be dependent on how many appearances Thomas made. He was signed by Harry Redknapp; however, injuries prevented him from establishing himself in the first-team under Redknapp. He struggled to return to full fitness after fracturing his spine and was released by Portsmouth in July 2009, having made only three first-team appearances in the 2008–09 season.

=== West Bromwich Albion ===
During the summer of 2009, he had trials with two Premier League teams, Hull City and Wolverhampton Wanderers. He instead dropped into the Championship to join West Bromwich Albion in August 2009. He scored his first goal for "Baggies" in his seventh appearance, in a 5–0 win away at Middlesbrough on 19 September. Three days later, Thomas was sent off in a League Cup tie against his former club Arsenal for a push on Jack Wilshere following an off the ball incident. He went on to record a career-high tally of eight goals in 29 appearances in the 2009–10 season to help West Brom to secure promotion with a second-place finish.

On 25 September 2010, he provided an assist for Peter Odemwingie and then went on to score the winning goal in a 3–2 win over Arsenal at the Emirates Stadium. On New Year's Day, he played in a defeat to Manchester United in what proved to be right-back Gary Neville's final game as a player; Neville later said "I was uncomfortable about the fans singing my name, uncomfortable about being out on the pitch knowing that I had just been destroyed by not the best player in the world [Jerome Thomas]." He also claimed goals against Blackburn Rovers and West Ham United to end the 2010–11 campaign with three goals in 33 league games.

He showed good form at the start of the 2011–12 campaign, which led manager Roy Hodgson to tell the media that he was not up for sale. He was described as a "real menace" after he scored the opener and played a major part in the buildup for the winning goal in a 2–1 victory over Bolton Wanderers on 19 November. He made a total of 31 appearances in the 2011–12 season, scoring two goals.

However, he found first-team games hard to come by under new head coach Steve Clarke after recovering from injury early in the 2012–13 season, as the good form of Zoltán Gera kept him out of the side. On 22 November 2012, he joined Championship club Leeds United on a six-week loan deal. He scored his first goal for the "Whites" on 15 December, opening the scoring in a 2–0 win over Ipswich Town at Elland Road. After the takeover of Leeds by the GFH Capital group, new Leeds director Salem Patel revealed that Leeds were in negotiations with West Brom to sign Thomas on a permanent deal. However, Thomas rejected the approach, vowing to fight for his place at West Brom following a serious injury to Zoltán Gera. Thomas featured in 12 games for West Brom in the second half of the season, but was released upon the expiry of his contract in May 2013.

=== Crystal Palace ===
In July 2013, Thomas signed a two-year contract with Premier League side Crystal Palace. The move reunited him with Ian Holloway, his former manager at QPR. However, he featured just nine times in the 2013–14 season, and was fined by manager Tony Pulis for diving during a 1–1 draw with Swansea City at the Liberty Stadium on 2 March. He played just six Premier League minutes in the 2014–15 season, and also started one League Cup game and had a brief cameo in the FA Cup before he was released in May 2015.

=== Rotherham United ===
Thomas trained with Hearts alongside his friend Osman Sow as he searched for a new club. He was offered a contract by manager Robbie Neilson, with the promise that he would also get the chance to learn how to coach at the club. He turned down the approach and had a trial at Ipswich Town in January 2016. In February 2016, he signed for Championship side Rotherham United on a deal until the end of the 2015–16 season, as new manager Neil Warnock's first signing at the New York Stadium; he had previously played under Warnock at Leeds and Crystal Palace. He made three starts and three substitute appearances to help the "Millers" avoid relegation at the end of the 2015–16 season.

=== Port Vale ===
Thomas signed a one-year contract with EFL League One club Port Vale in July 2016. He began the 2016–17 season short of match fitness, but by 27 August he put in a man of the match performance to help the "Valiants" record a 3–1 victory over Scunthorpe United at Vale Park. In October, he was named as one of the club's four joint-captains. He was named in the League One 'Team of the Day' after providing the crosses for both of Vale's goals in a 2–1 victory over Fleetwood Town on 12 November. Coach Andy Smith said that "he is the best winger in this league and we are lucky to have him at our club". However, Michael Brown succeeded Bruno Ribeiro as manager, and speaking in February 2017, Brown criticised Thomas for his injury and illness record which had caused him to miss 11 league games up to that point, saying "that's just Jerome isn't it?...it is very frustrating... if he keeps getting injured every week it is going to be tough for him". He was released by Brown following the club's relegation in May 2017.

== International career ==
Thomas was named in the England squad for the 2002 UEFA European Under-19 Championship in Norway, and scored in England's opening game of the tournament, a 3–3 draw with Germany at the Nadderud Stadion on 22 July. He went on to be named in the England squad for the 2003 FIFA World Youth Championship in the United Arab Emirates, and played all three group games as England were eliminated in last place. He scored in a 4–1 win over Poland in a UEFA European Under-21 Championship qualifier at Hillsborough on 11 October 2005.

Thomas was eligible to represent Guyana due to his Guyanese heritage.

== Post-playing career ==
In 2021, Thomas was appointed Everton's academy area co-ordinator for London, having previously held a part-time scouting role at Chelsea. In July 2022, he took up the role of head of academy recruitment at Watford. In August 2023, he became head of Academy recruitment at Brighton & Hove Albion.

== Career statistics ==
Appearances and goals by club, season and competition
Club	Season	League			FA Cup		EFL Cup		Other		Total	
Club	Season	Division	Apps	Goals	Apps	Goals	Apps	Goals	Apps	Goals	Apps	Goals
Arsenal	2001–02	Premier League	0	0	0	0	0	0	0	0	0	0
Arsenal	2002–03	Premier League	0	0	0	0	0	0	0	0	0	0
Arsenal	2003–04	Premier League	0	0	0	0	3	0	0	0	3	0
Arsenal	Total		0	0	0	0	3	0	0	0	3	0
Queens Park Rangers (loan)	2001–02	Second Division	4	1	0	0	0	0	—		4	1
Queens Park Rangers (loan)	2002–03	Second Division	6	2	0	0	0	0	—		6	2
Queens Park Rangers (loan)	Total		10	3	0	0	0	0	0	0	10	3
Charlton Athletic	2003–04	Premier League	1	0	0	0	0	0	—		1	0
Charlton Athletic	2004–05	Premier League	24	3	3	0	1	0	—		28	3
Charlton Athletic	2005–06	Premier League	25	1	4	0	2	0	—		31	1
Charlton Athletic	2006–07	Premier League	20	3	1	0	3	0	—		24	3
Charlton Athletic	2007–08	Championship	32	0	1	0	0	0	—		33	0
Charlton Athletic	2008–09	Championship	1	0	0	0	1	0	—		2	0
Charlton Athletic	Total		103	7	9	0	7	0	0	0	119	7
Portsmouth	2008–09	Premier League	3	0	0	0	0	0	—		3	0
Leeds United (loan)	2012–13	Championship	6	1	0	0	1	0	—		7	1
West Bromwich Albion	2009–10	Championship	27	7	1	1	1	0	—		29	8
West Bromwich Albion	2010–11	Premier League	33	3	1	0	0	0	—		34	3
West Bromwich Albion	2011–12	Premier League	29	1	1	0	1	1	—		31	2
West Bromwich Albion	2012–13	Premier League	10	0	2	0	0	0	—		12	0
West Bromwich Albion	Total		99	11	5	1	2	1	0	0	106	13
Crystal Palace	2013–14	Premier League	9	0	0	0	0	0	—		9	0
Crystal Palace	2014–15	Premier League	1	0	1	0	1	0	—		3	0
Crystal Palace	Total		10	0	1	0	1	0	0	0	12	0
Rotherham United	2015–16	Championship	6	0	—		—		—		6	0
Port Vale	2016–17	EFL League One	23	1	2	0	1	0	0	0	26	1
Career total			260	23	17	1	15	1	0	0	292	25

== Honours ==
Arsenal

- FA Youth Cup: 1999–2000, 2000–01

West Bromwich Albion

- Football League Championship second-place promotion: 2009–10
