= Kevin McLeod (footballer, born 1980) =

English footballer

Personal information
- Full name: Kevin Andrew McLeod
- Date of birth: 12 September 1980 (age 46)
- Place of birth: Liverpool, England
- Position: Midfielder

Youth career
- 1996–2000: Everton Academy

Senior career*
Years	Team	Apps	(Gls)
2000–2003	Everton	5	(0)
2003	→ Queens Park Rangers (loan)	8	(2)
2003	→ Queens Park Rangers (loan)	1	(0)
2003–2005	Queens Park Rangers	58	(4)
2005–2006	Swansea City	45	(7)
2006–2008	Colchester United	52	(7)
2008–2010	Brighton & Hove Albion	26	(0)
2010	Wycombe Wanderers	11	(0)
2010	Redbridge	15	(5)
2011	Braintree Town	1	(0)
2011	Thurrock	1	(0)
Total		227	(25)
- * Club domestic league appearances and goals

Kevin Andrew McLeod (born 12 September 1980) is an English former professional footballer who played as a left-sided midfielder.

Starting his career as an Everton trainee, by 2000 he made his way into first team contention. Unable to establish himself at the Premier League side he joined Queens Park Rangers in 2003, following two successful loan spells. After two seasons with QPR, he then spent a season with Swansea City. In 2006, he moved on to Colchester United, where he spent another two years before moving on again, this time to Brighton & Hove Albion. His time at Brighton was rather less successful than at his previous clubs, and he departed in 2010 for a brief spell at Wycombe Wanderers. As of September 2010 he was playing for Redbridge in the Ryman One North.

== Playing career ==
McLeod is a product of the Everton Academy. He found his first-team opportunities limited, making only five League appearances for the club, all as a substitute in the 2000–01 season. These games were both fixtures with Ipswich Town and Chelsea, and a home win over Arsenal. Over the following two seasons he boasted just a cameo FA Cup appearance, and a League Cup start.

In January 2003 the club rejected an advance by Ronnie Moore's Rotherham United, as well as Preston North End. He subsequently joined Ian Holloway's Queens Park Rangers on loan March in 2003. He made eight league starts, scoring both goals in a 2–0 win over Luton Town on 12 April, before securing a place in the team for all three play-off games. The play-offs saw QPR conquer Oldham Athletic 2–1 on aggregate, before losing out 1–0 to Cardiff City at the Millennium Stadium thanks to an Andy Campbell extra time goal. He signed a new one-year deal with the Toffees in July 2003, despite interest from Scottish Premier League side Dundee United.

He re-joined Rangers on loan at the start of the following season, and after one game the move was made permanent in August 2003 for a fee of up to £250,000 (based on appearances). He scored four times in 39 games that season, however he spent much of his time on the substitutes' bench.

The 2004–05 campaign continued in the same vein for McLeod, and he joined up with former Rangers assistant manager Kenny Jackett at Swansea City in February 2005 for an undisclosed fee. This came days after he rejected a £100,000 move to Chester City. He made eleven appearances for the League Two club and helped them to a third-place finish and automatic promotion achievement.

McLeod started the 2005–06 in tremendous fashion, scoring seven goals in the club's opening six fixtures. This spell included a brace in a 3–1 win over Barnsley and a hat-trick over Bristol City in his next game two weeks later, both played at the Liberty Stadium. This led to the club opening contract negotiations with the player as early as October. He quickly lost his shooting form however as he failed to find the net in the rest of the 29 games that campaign. In March 2006, McLeod was transfer-listed for a breach of club discipline (unacceptable drinking sessions) and Jackett urged him to leave Swansea. He earned a dramatic lifeline, however, after an injury crisis and slump in form necessitated his return to the team. This ended speculation of a move to Southend United. Sheffield Wednesday, Colchester, Doncaster Rovers, Peterborough United and Chester had also expressed interest in signing the player. His comeback seemed to be ended in late April after he fractured his ankle. The Swans made in into the play-off final, however McLeod again ended up at the losing side at the Millennium Stadium as Barnsley won 4–3 on penalties following a 2–2 draw. McLeod only played the second half of extra-time after replacing Andy Robinson. Despite a bitter loss to their Welsh rivals, McLeod had done well to even make it onto the pitch after recovering from his injury in such a short time.

He joined Championship club Colchester United at the end of August 2006 on a free transfer, with Swansea writing off the two extra years he had left on his contract. He played 25 times over all competitions in the 2006–07 season, scoring three goals.

The 2007–08 season saw him limited to thirty matches, and four goals. Two of these came in his final game for the club, in a 3–3 draw at Scunthorpe United on 4 May 2008. He was the first and last player to score for the club that season, as he had opened the scoring at Sheffield United on 11 August 2007. The season was a travesty for the club as they were relegated in last place, fifteen points from safety.

In June 2008, it was revealed the McLeod has turned down the offer of a further two-year contract at Colchester United and the player agreed to join League One rivals Brighton & Hove Albion on a free transfer. Assistant manager Dean White felt that McLeod could have a big season at the club. He scored twice in his first season at Brighton, with strikes against Northampton in the Football League Trophy and Hartlepool in the FA Cup. However, after many injuries and time spent playing in the reserves due to lack of fatigue and excessive weight, McLeod was released from his contract at Brighton at the end of January 2010. He quickly signed a short-term contract until the end of June 2010 with League One side Wycombe Wanderers. Making his debut in a 1–1 draw at Brentford, he played eleven games for the club before being released at the end of the season. He suffered his second relegation, as Wycombe finished five points from safety.

In July 2010 he joined League Two Aldershot Town on trial, the next month he joined fellow League Two side Port Vale on trial, again teaming up with former boss Micky Adams. He joined St Mirren on trial the following month, but again failed to win a contract.

Having begun the 2011–12 football season with newly promoted Conference Premier side Braintree Town, McLeod went on to enjoy a very brief stay with Thurrock before signing for Chelmsford City during December 2011. McLeod has since joined a Sunday league team in Colchester where he has continued to perform at a high level.

== Playing style ==
Described as a "lively character on and off the pitch", McLeod is a winger who "likes to take on opposing full-backs". Commentators have noted that "his ability to carry the ball and run at defenders are his major strengths".

== Personal life ==
In June 2005 his agent was Neil Sang.

In 2007 Special Duties and Koopa re-recorded the "Up the U's!" with a song entitled "Stand Up For Col U" featuring the vocal talents of McLeod and his Colchester United teammates Jamie Cureton, Chris Iwelumo, Wayne Brown, Karl Duguid, Kevin Watson, Pat Baldwin and Dean Gerken. The single was released to raise funds for the Teenage Cancer Trust and also he has a son called Callum .

== Career statistics ==
Appearances and goals by club, season and competition
Club	Season	League			FA Cup		League Cup		Other		Total	
Club	Season	Division	Apps	Goals	Apps	Goals	Apps	Goals	Apps	Goals	Apps	Goals
Everton	2000–01	Premier League	5	0	0	0	0	0	0	0	5	0
Everton	2001–02	Premier League	0	0	0	0	1	0	0	0	1	0
Everton	2002–03	Premier League	0	0	1	0	0	0	0	0	1	0
Everton	Total		5	0	1	0	1	0	0	0	7	0
Queens Park Rangers (loan)	2002–03	Second Division	11	2	0	0	0	0	0	0	11	2
Queens Park Rangers (loan)	2003–04	Second Division	1	0	0	0	0	0	0	0	1	0
Queens Park Rangers	2003–04	Second Division	34	3	1	0	2	0	1 (Note: Appearance(s) in Football League Trophy.)	1	38	4
Queens Park Rangers	2004–05	Championship	24	1	1	0	2	1	0	0	27	2
Queens Park Rangers	Total		58	4	2	0	4	1	1	1	65	6
Swansea City	2004–05	League Two	11	0	0	0	0	0	0	0	11	0
Swansea City	2005–06	League One	30	7	1	0	1	0	3	0	35	7
Swansea City	2006–07	League One	4	0	0	0	1	0	0	0	5	0
Swansea City	Total		45	7	1	0	2	0	3	0	51	7
Colchester United	2006–07	Championship	24	3	1	0	0	0	0	0	25	3
Colchester United	2007–08	Championship	28	4	1	0	1	0	0	0	30	4
Colchester United	Total		52	7	2	0	1	0	0	0	55	7
Brighton & Hove Albion	2008–09	League One	21	0	1	1	2	0	4	1	28	2
Brighton & Hove Albion	2009–10	League One	5	0	2	0	0	0	1	0	8	0
Brighton & Hove Albion	Total		26	0	3	1	2	0	5	1	36	2
Wycombe Wanderers	2009–10	League One	11	0	0	0	0	0	0	0	11	0
Career total			210	20	9	1	10	1	9	2	238	24

== Honours ==
with Everton

- FA Youth Cup winner: 1998

with Queens Park Rangers

- Football League Second Division play-off final runner-up: 2003

with Swansea City

- Football League Two third place promotion winner: 2004–05
- Football League One play-off final runner-up: 2006

Essex County Cup 2017/18
