= Oliver Burgess =

English footballer

Personal information
- Full name: Oliver David Burgess
- Date of birth: 12 October 1981 (age 45)
- Place of birth: Ascot, England
- Position: Midfielder

Senior career*
Years	Team	Apps	(Gls)
2000–2003	Queens Park Rangers	10	(1)
2003–2004	Northampton Town	9	(0)
2005–2006	Kettering Town		
2006–2010	Nuneaton Borough		
2011–2014	Slough Town	62	(9)
- * Club domestic league appearances and goals

Oliver Burgess (born 12 October 1981) is a professional footballer who last played for Southern Football League Division One Central side Slough Town.

Signed from league rivals Kettering Town as the first signing for the 2006-7 campaign. Burgess has made a number of appearances in the Football League for both Northampton Town and Queens Park Rangers before his career was cut short by a serious knee injury. It was at QPR that he scored his first career goal in a 4–0 win over Swindon Town.

In non-league football, he has scored regularly from midfield in recent seasons. He has played as a central midfielder and on the right.
