= Doudou (footballer) =

French footballer (born 1980)

Personal information
- Full name: Aziana Ebele Mbombo
- Date of birth: 11 September 1980 (age 46)
- Position: Winger

Youth career
- 1995–2001: Monaco

Senior career*
Years	Team	Apps	(Gls)
2001–2004	Queens Park Rangers	46	(3)
2004	Farnborough Town	8	(1)
2005	Oxford United	1	(0)
- Racing Paris
Total		55	(4)
- * Club domestic league appearances and goals

Aziana Ebele Mbombo, nicknamed Doudou (born 11 September 1980) is a French former professional footballer who played as a winger.

== Career ==
Doudou spent six years with Monaco, before signing for English club Queens Park Rangers in 2001, where his wages were paid for by fan Harold Winton. Over the next two seasons, Doudou made 46 appearances in the Football League. Doudou moved to non-league side Farnborough Town in January 2004, before returning to English league football with Oxford United in January 2005. After making 1 League appearance for Oxford, he returned to France to play with Racing Paris.
