= Wes Daly =

English footballer

Personal information
- Full name: Wesley Daly
- Date of birth: 7 March 1984 (age 42)
- Place of birth: Hammersmith, England
- Height: 5 ft 8 in (1.73 m)
- Position: Midfielder

Senior career*
Years	Team	Apps	(Gls)
2001–2005	Queens Park Rangers	9	(0)
2003	→ Gravesend & Northfleet (loan)	1	(0)
2004	→ Raith Rovers (loan)	10	(1)
2005	Grays Athletic	22	(2)
2005–2007	AFC Wimbledon	69	(5)
2007–2008	Maidenhead United	34	(0)
2008–2009	Boreham Wood	36	(1)
2009	Hendon	1	(0)
2009–2011	Bromley	59	(0)
2011–2014	Basingstoke Town	112	(11)
2014–2015	Hemel Hempstead Town	13	(0)
2015	→ Hayes & Yeading United (loan)	8	(0)
2015	Leatherhead	1	(0)
2015–2017	Egham Town	15	(0)
2017–2020	Beaconsfield Town		
- * Club domestic league appearances and goals

Wesley Daly (born 7 March 1984) is a former professional player who is assistant manager at Risborough Rangers FC.

== Career ==
Daly came through the ranks at Queens Park Rangers and went on to turn professional for the Loftus Road-based club, making his first team debut for the club as a teenager in March 2002 in the 3–1 defeat to Colchester United.

Daly gave away a freak penalty by slipping in his own box and handling the ball in a Football League Second Division match against Chesterfield on 14 August 2002.

Daly moved to non-League Gravesend & Northfleet on a one-month loan spell in which he made one substitute appearance before being recalled by QPR after only a week due to a lack of first team cover at the Second Division club.

Daly was subsequently loaned out to Raith Rovers in August 2004, where he made 10 professional appearances for the Scottish side, scoring one goal against Hamilton Academical.

Daly was eventually released by QPR in February 2005, having made a total of 11 appearances for the club, and was signed for a nominal fee and on non-contract terms by non-League Grays Athletic, where he had impressed in a brief loan spell the previous season.

Daly signed for AFC Wimbledon on 19 August 2005, helping them get to the playoff semi-finals two years running. On 4 July 2007 he signed for Maidenhead United, leaving at the end of the season and joined Boreham Wood.

On 16 October 2009, Daly signed for Isthmian League Premier Division side Hendon, before moving on in December to Bromley.

Daly joined Basingstoke Town in the summer of 2011. He stayed with the Dragons until he was released in May 2014, after which he signed for Hemel Hempstead Town. Following a loan spell with Hayes & Yeading United, Daly signed for Leatherhead but it proved to be a short spell.

In December 2015, Daly signed for Southern Football League side Egham Town.

At the end of the 2016-17 season, Daly followed Egham Town manager, Gary Meakin, to Beaconsfield Town.

In the summer of 2023, Daly followed Meakin again this time to Rayners Lane as his assistant.

In October 2024, Daly once again teamed up with Meakin - becoming his assistant manager at Southern Football League Division One Central side Northwood.
