= 2000–01 Queens Park Rangers F.C. season =

English football club season

Queens Park Rangers
2000–01 season
- Manager: Gerry Francis (until 25 February); Ian Holloway (from 26 February)
- Stadium: Loftus Road
- First Division: 23rd
- FA Cup: Fourth round
- League Cup: First round
- Top goalscorer: League: Peter Crouch (10); All: Peter Crouch (12)
- Highest home attendance: 19,003 27 January 2001 Arsenal
- Lowest home attendance: 4,042 6 September 2000 Colchester United
- Average home league attendance: 12,013
- Biggest win: 2–0 Vs West Bromwich Albion (13 January 2001), Tranmere Rovers (16 April 2001), Barnsley (17 February 2001)
- Biggest defeat: 0–5 Vs Preston North End (10 February 2001), Wimbledon (24 February 2001)
Home colours	Away colours	Third colours

During the 2000–01 English football season, Queens Park Rangers F.C. competed in the Football League First Division.

== Season summary ==
In the 2000–2001 season, Peter crouch emerged as a future star but despite this QPR were relegated to the third tier for the first time since 1967. Manager Gerry Francis was fired a day after a 5–0 defeat to Wimbledon and replaced by Ian Holloway.

== Kit ==
Le Coq Sportif continued as QPR's kit manufacturers. Telecommunications giant Ericsson continued as kit sponsors.

== Final league table ==
Pos	Team	Pld	W	D	L	GF	GA	GD	Pts	Qualification or relegation
20	Portsmouth	46	10	19	17	47	59	−12	49	
21	Crystal Palace	46	12	13	21	57	70	−13	49	
22	Huddersfield Town (R)	46	11	15	20	48	57	−9	48	Relegation to the Second Division
23	Queens Park Rangers (R)	46	7	19	20	45	75	−30	40	Relegation to the Second Division
24	Tranmere Rovers (R)	46	9	11	26	46	77	−31	38	Relegation to the Second Division

Rules for classification: 1) Points; 2) Goal difference; 3) Goals scored
(R) Relegated

== Results ==
Queens Park Rangers' score comes first

=== Legend ===
Win	Draw	Loss

=== Football League First Division ===
Game	Date	Opponents	Venue	Result F–A	Scorers	Attendance	Position
1	12 August 2000	Birmingham City	H	0–0		13,926	14
2	20 August 2000	Crystal Palace	A	1–1	Carlisle	19,020	14
3	26 August 2000	Crewe Alexandra	H	1–0	Furlong	9,415	9
4	28 August 2000	West Bromwich Albion	A	1–2	Kiwomya	14,831	13
5	9 September 2000	Preston North End	H	0–0		11,092	12
6	13 September 2000	Gillingham	H	2–2	Kiwomya, Crouch	10,655	13
7	16 September 2000	Barnsley	A	2–4	Kiwomya (2)	12,763	17
8	23 September 2000	Wimbledon	H	2–1	Crouch, Wardley	11,720	14
9	30 September 2000	Sheffield United	A	1–1	Koejoe	13,803	16
	8 October 2000	Fulham	H	PP			
10	14 October 2000	Watford	A	1–3	Connolly	17,488	17
11	17 October 2000	Grimsby Town	A	1–3	Connolly	4,428	17
12	21 October 2000	Burnley	H	0–1		11,426	18
13	25 October 2000	Sheffield Wednesday	H	1–2	Peacock	10,353	20
14	28 October 2000	Tranmere Rovers	A	1–1	Connolly	7,268	20
15	31 October 2000	Bolton Wanderers	A	1–3	Crouch	10,180	20
16	4 November 2000	Portsmouth	H	1–1	Peschisolido	12,036	20
17	11 November 2000	Stockport County	A	2–2	Carlisle, Langley	6,356	22
18	18 November 2000	Huddersfield Town	H	1–1	Connolly	11,543	22
19	25 November 2000	Wolverhampton Wanderers	H	2–2	Peacock (2)	11,156	22
20	2 December 2000	Sheffield Wednesday	A	2–5	Crouch (2)	21,728	22
21	9 December 2000	Blackburn Rovers	A	0–0		16,886	23
22	16 December 2000	Nottingham Forest	H	1–0	Crouch	14,409	23
23	23 December 2000	Birmingham City	A	0–0		24,311	24
24	26 December 2000	Norwich City	H	2–3	Carlisle, Wardley	12,338	24
25	30 December 2000	Crystal Palace	H	1–1	Crouch	14,439	23
	1-Jan-01	Crewe Alexandra	A	PP			
26	13 January 2001	West Bromwich Albion	H	2–0	Koejoe, Plummer	11,881	23
27	20 January 2001	Norwich City	A	0–1		16,472	23
28	31 January 2001	Fulham	H	0–2		16,403	23
29	3 February 2001	Bolton Wanderers	H	1–1	Ngonge	10,293	23
30	10 February 2001	Preston North End	A	0–5		14,423	23
31	17 February 2001	Barnsley	H	2–0	Kiwomya, Crouch	9,388	21
32	20 February 2001	Gillingham	A	1–0	Kiwomya	10,432	20
33	24 February 2001	Wimbledon	A	0–5		9,446	21
34	3 March 2001	Sheffield United	H	1–3	Ngonge	11,024	22
35	7 March 2001	Watford	H	1–1	Ngonge	12,436	22
36	10 March 2001	Fulham	A	0–2		16,021	22
37	17 March 2001	Grimsby Town	H	0–1		17,608	23
38	24 March 2001	Burnley	A	1–2	Bignot	14,018	23
39	31 March 2001	Nottingham Forest	A	1–1	Wardley	22,208	23
40	7 April 2001	Blackburn Rovers	H	1–3	Plummer	12,449	23
41	10 April 2001	Crewe Alexandra	A	2–2	Crouch, Thomson	6,354	24
42	14 April 2001	Portsmouth	A	1–1	Thomson	13,426	23
43	16 April 2001	Tranmere Rovers	H	2–0	Thomson, Crouch	9,696	23
44	21 April 2001	Huddersfield Town	A	1–2	Thomson	12,846	23
45	28 April 2001	Stockport County	H	0 – 3		10,608	23
46	6 May 2001	Wolverhampton Wanderers	A	1–1	Bruce	17,447	23

=== FA Cup ===
Match	Date	Opponent	Venue	Result F–A	Attendance	Scorers
R3	6 January 2001	Luton Town (Second Division)	A	3 – 3	8,677	Crouch 47', 52, Peacock 88'
R3 Replay	17 January 2001	Luton Town (Second Division)	H	2 – 1 AET	14,395	Kiwomya 90', 112'
R4	27 January 2001	Arsenal (FA Premiership)	H	0 – 6	19,003	

=== Worthington Cup ===
Match	Date	Opponent	Venue	Result F–A	Attendance	Scorers
R1 1st leg	23 August 2000	Colchester United (Second Division)	A	1 – 0	3,916	Kiwomya 27'
R1 2nd leg	6 September 2000	Colchester United (Second Division)	H	1 – 4	4,042	Kiwomya 45'

=== Friendlies ===
Date		Opponents	Venue	Result F–A	Scorers	Attendance
17-Jul-00		Exeter City v Queens Park Rangers	A			
18-Jul-00		Tiverton Town v Queens Park Rangers	A			
22-Jul-00		Brentford v Queens Park Rangers	A			
25-Jul-00		Wycombe Wanderers v Queens Park Rangers	A			
29-Jul-00		Aldershot Town v Queens Park Rangers	A			
1-Aug-00		Queens Park Rangers v Millwall	H			
5-Aug-00	Danny Maddix Testimonial	Queens Park Rangers v Tottenham Hotspur	H			
11-Oct-00		Queens Park Rangers v Luton Town	H			

== Squad ==
Position	Nationality	Name	League Appearances	League Goals	Cup Appearances	Worthington Cup Goals	F.A.Cup Goals	Total Appearances	Total Goals
GK	CZE	Ludek Miklosko	17		1			18	
GK	ENG	Lee Harper	29		2			31	
DF	FIN	Antti Heinola						2	
DF	ENG	Danny Maddix	1					2	
DF	WAL	Karl Ready	19		1			24	
DF	ENG	Jermaine Darlington	32		4			37	
DF	ENG	Tim Breacker	8		1			11	
DF	ENG	Wayne Brown	2					2	
DF	ENG	Justin Cochrane						1	
DF	ENG	Marcus Bignot	8	1				9	1
DF	ENG	Matthew Rose	26		3			29	
DF	NIR	Steve Morrow	18		3			27	
DF	ENG	Ian Baraclough	26		4			33	
DF	AUS	George Kulcsar	9		1			15	
DF	ENG	Chris Plummer	25	2	3			29	2
DF	ENG	Marlon Broomes	5					5	
MF	ENG	Alex Higgins						1	
MF	ENG	Paul Murray	4					6	
MF	ENG	Ben Walshe						1	
MF	ENG	Paul Bruce	5	1				8	1
MF	NIR	Keith Rowland	4					4	
MF	ENG	Oliver Burgess						1	
MF	ENG	Christer Warren	16					22	
MF	ENG	Clarke Carlisle	27	3	5			32	3
MF	ENG	Mark Perry	23		4			33	
MF	ENG	Gavin Peacock	31	3	2		1	35	4
MF	ENG	Richard Langley	26	1				31	1
MF	NIR	Terry McFlynn	1					2	
FW	ENG	Karl Connolly	17	4	3			27	4
FW	IRE	Tony Scully	1					2	
FW	ENG	Leon Knight	10					11	
FW	ENG	Chris Kiwomya	20	6	3	2	2	30	10
FW	BEL	Michel Ngonge	7	3				15	
FW	ENG	Alvin Bubb						1	
FW	ENG	Andy Thomson	7	4				8	4
FW	JAM	Kevin Lisbie	1					2	
FW	ENG	Paul Furlong	3	1				3	1
FW	NIR	Ian Dowie						1	
FW	HOL	Sammy Koejoe	8	2	3			26	2
FW	ENG	Richard Pacquette	1					2	
FW	ENG	Stuart Wardley	26	3	1			37	3
FW	CAN	Paul Peschisolido	5	1				5	1
FW	ENG	Peter Crouch	38	10	4		2	47	12

=== Reserve squad ===
Note: Flags indicate national team as defined under FIFA eligibility rules; some limited exceptions apply. Players may hold more than one non-FIFA nationality.

No.	Pos.	Nation	Player
26	MF	NIR	Richard Graham
29	FW	ENG	Ross Weare

No.	Pos.	Nation	Player
32	MF	ENG	Danny Grieves (on loan from Maccabi Haifa)
34	GK	ENG	Nikki Bull

== Transfers Out ==
Name	from	Date	Fee	Date	Club	Fee
Ademola Bankole	Crewe	1 July 1998	Free	July 00	Crewe	Free
Kevin Gallen	Queens Park Rangers Juniors	22 Sep 1992		August 2000	Huddersfield Town	Free
Rob Steiner	Bradford C	26 July 1999	£215,000	Oct 00	Retired (knee inj.)	
Paul Furlong	Birmingham	15 Aug 2000	Loan	Oct 00	Birmingham	Loan
Marlon Broomes	Blackburn	25 Oct 2000	Loan	Nov 00	Blackburn	Loan
Paul Peschisolido	Fulham	3 Nov 2000	Loan	Dec 00	Fulham	Loan
Keith Rowland	West Ham United	January 1998	With Iain Dowie and £2,300,000 For Trevor Sinclair	January 2001	Luton Town	Loan
Kevin Lisbie	Charlton	1 Dec 2000	Loan	1 Jan	Charlton	Loan
Leon Jeanne	Queens Park Rangers Juniors	17 Nov 1997		1 Mar	Cardiff	Free
Danny Grieves	Maccabi Herzliya (Isr)	2 Aug 2000	Free	1 Mar		Free
Iain Dowie	West Ham	28 Jan 1998	£100,000	1 Mar	Retired	
Steve Morrow	Arsenal	March 1997	£1,000,000	March 2001	Peterborough United	Loan
Tim Breacker	West Ham	9 Feb 1999	Free	1 Apr	Retired (Ankle inj.) (QPR Coach)	
Leon Knight	Chelsea	8 Mar 2001	Loan	1 May	Chelsea	Loan
Wayne Brown	Ipswich	20 Mar 2001	Loan	1 May	Ipswich	Loan
Richard Graham	Queens Park Rangers Juniors	June1997		1 May	Chesham U	Free
Bertie Brayley	West Ham	12 Aug 2000	Free	1 May	Swindon	Free
George Kulcsar	Bradford C	16 Dec 1997	£250,000	1 May	Home U (Singap.)	Free
Alvin Bubb	Queens Park Rangers Juniors	16 Nov 1998		1 May	Bristol R	Free
Alex Higgins	Sheffield W	16 Mar 2001	Free	1 May	Emley	Free
Ross Weare	East End U	25 Mar 1999	£5,000	1 June	Bristol R	Free
Ludek Miklosko	West Ham	1 Oct 1998	£50,000	1 June	West Ham (g-coach)	Free
Ian Baraclough	Notts County	16 Mar 1998	£50,000	1 June	Notts County	Free

== Transfers In ==
Name	from	Date	Fee
Ben Walshe	Queens Park Rangers Juniors	July 2000	
Peter Crouch	Tottenham	27 July 2000	£60,000
Bertie Brayley	West Ham	12 Aug 2000	Free
Paul Furlong	Birmingham City	15 Aug 2000	Loan
Danny Grieves	Maccabi Herzliya (Isr)	2 Aug 2000	Free
David Wattley	Queens Park Rangers Juniors	8 Sep 2000	
Marlon Broomes	Blackburn	25 Oct 2000	Loan
Brian Fitzgerald	Queens Park Rangers Juniors	October 2000	
Paul Peschisolido	Fulham	3 Nov 2000	Loan
Kevin Lisbie	Charlton	1 Dec 2000	Loan
Michel Ngonge	Watford	13 Dec 2000	£50,000
Justin Cochrane	Queens Park Rangers Juniors	Jan2001	
Richard Pacquette	Queens Park Rangers Juniors	Jan2001	
Akpo Sodje	Globe Star (Nig)	Feb2001	
Wayne Brown	Ipswich Town	20 Mar 2001	Loan
Leon Knight	Chelsea	8 Mar 2001	Loan
Marcus Bignot	Bristol Rovers	16 Mar 2001	£25,000
Alex Higgins	Sheffield Wednesday	16 Mar 2001	Free
Andy Thomson	Gillingham	22 Mar 2001	Free
Leroy Griffiths	Hampton & Richmond	31 May 2001	£40,000
Brian Fitzgerald	Queens Park Rangers Juniors	June2001	
Ryan D'Austin	Queens Park Rangers Juniors	June2001	
Richard Brady	Queens Park Rangers Juniors	June2001	
Danny Murphy	Queens Park Rangers Juniors	June2001	
Lyndon Duncan	Queens Park Rangers Juniors	June2001	
