= 1999–2000 Queens Park Rangers F.C. season =

English football club season

Queens Park Rangers
1999–2000 season
- Chairman: Chris Wright
- Manager: Gerry Francis
- Stadium: Loftus Road
- First Division: 10th
- FA Cup: Fourth round
- League Cup: First round
- Top goalscorer: League: Kiwomya (13); All: Kiwomya/Wardley (14)
- Highest home attendance: 19,002 6 November 1999 Manchester City
- Lowest home attendance: 6,185 25 August 1999 Cardiff City
- Average home league attendance: 12,589
- Biggest win: 4-1 Vs Ipswich Town (16 October 1999)
- Biggest defeat: 0–3 Crystal Palace (14 November 1999)
| Home colours | Away colours |

During the 1999–2000 English football season, Queens Park Rangers F.C. competed in the Football League First Division.

== Season summary ==
In the 1999–2000 season, QPR were in the top half for most of the campaign but their play-off hopes were all but sunk after a poor run of form at the turn of the year by going nine league games without a win.

== Kit ==
Le Coq Sportif continued as QPR's kit manufacturers. Telecommunications giant Ericsson continued as kit sponsors.

== Final league table ==
| Pos | Team | Pld | W | D | L | GF | GA | GD | Pts |
|---|---|---|---|---|---|---|---|---|---|
| 8 | Huddersfield Town | 46 | 21 | 11 | 14 | 62 | 49 | +13 | 74 |
| 9 | Fulham | 46 | 17 | 16 | 13 | 49 | 41 | +8 | 67 |
| 10 | Queens Park Rangers | 46 | 16 | 18 | 12 | 62 | 53 | +9 | 66 |
| 11 | Blackburn Rovers | 46 | 15 | 17 | 14 | 55 | 51 | +4 | 62 |
| 12 | Norwich City | 46 | 14 | 15 | 17 | 45 | 50 | −5 | 57 |

Rules for classification: 1) Points; 2) Goal difference; 3) Goals scored

== Results ==
Queens Park Rangers' score comes first

=== Legend ===
| Win | Draw | Loss |

=== Football League First Division ===
| Date | Opponents | Venue | Result F–A | Scorers | Attendance | Position |
|---|---|---|---|---|---|---|
| 7 August 1999 | Huddersfield Town | H | 3–1 | Darlington, Kiwomya, Peacock | 13,642 | 3 |
| 14 August 1999 | Bolton Wanderers | A | 1–2 | Peacock (pen) | 13,019 | 10 |
| 21 August 1999 | Wolverhampton Wanderers | H | 1–1 | Peacock | 13,239 | 10 |
| 28 August 1999 | Nottingham Forest | A | 1–1 | Ready | 18,442 | 12 |
| 31 August 1999 | Port Vale | H | 3–2 | Wardley (2), Kiwomya | 9,502 | 6 |
| 4 September 1999 | Stockport County | A | PP | | | |
| 11 September 1999 | Sheffield United | H | PP | | | |
| 18 September 1999 | Fulham | A | 0–1 | | 19,623 | 13 |
| 25 September 1999 | Birmingham City | A | 0–2 | | 18,748 | 17 |
| 2 October 1999 | Blackburn Rovers | H | 0–0 | | 14,002 | 18 |
| 9 October 1999 | Tranmere Rovers | H | 2–1 | Steiner, Peacock | 9,357 | 14 |
| 16 October 1999 | Ipswich Town | A | 4–1 | Peacock, Wardley, Steiner (2) | 17,544 | 10 |
| 19 October 1999 | West Bromwich Albion | A | 1–0 | Wardley | 9,874 | 9 |
| 23 October 1999 | Portsmouth | H | 0–0 | | 13,303 | 9 |
| 27 October 1999 | Birmingham City | H | 2–2 | Steiner, Kiwomya | 11,196 | 10 |
| 30 October 1999 | Blackburn Rovers | A | 2–0 | Wardley, Gallen | 17,491 | 8 |
| 2 November 1999 | Stockport County | A | 3–3 | Gallen (2), Maddix | 4,868 | 8 |
| 6 November 1999 | Manchester City | H | 1–1 | Kiwomya 39' | 19,002 | 9 |
| 14 November 1999 | Crystal Palace | A | 0–3 | | 15,861 | 10 |
| 20 November 1999 | Walsall | H | 2–1 | Wardley, Kiwomya | 10,058 | 7 |
| 23 November 1999 | Grimsby Town | A | 1–2 | Kiwomya | 4,297 | 10 |
| 27 November 1999 | Barnsley | H | 2–2 | Darlington, Steiner | 11,054 | 9 |
| 30 November 1999 | Sheffield United | H | 3–1 | Steiner, Wardley, Breacker | 9,922 | 7 |
| 4 December 1999 | Huddersfield Town | A | 0–1 | | 13,027 | 8 |
| 18 December 1999 | Charlton Athletic | H | 0–0 | | 14,709 | 8 |
| 26 December 1999 | Norwich City | A | 1–2 | Wardley | 17,823 | 10 |
| 28 December 1999 | Crewe Alexandra | H | 1–0 | Wardley | 12,011 | 8 |
| 3 January 2000 | Swindon Town | A | 1–0 | Langley 90' | 9,460 | 7 |
| 15 January 2000 | Bolton Wanderers | H | 0–1 | | 11,396 | 8 |
| 22 January 2000 | Wolverhampton Wanderers | A | 2–3 | Peacock, Slade | 20,069 | 9 |
| 29 January 2000 | Nottingham Forest | H | 1–1 | Kiwomya | 12,297 | 10 |
| 5 February 2000 | Port Vale | A | 1–1 | Wardley | 5,493 | 10 |
| 12 February 2000 | Stockport County | H | 1–1 | Kiwomya | 10,531 | 11 |
| 19 February 2000 | Barnsley | A | 1–1 | Rose | 14,212 | 10 |
| 28 February 2000 | Fulham | H | 0–0 | | 16,308 | 11 |
| 5 March 2000 | Sheffield United | A | 1–1 | Beck | 11,554 | 11 |
| 8 March 2000 | Manchester City | A | 3–1 | Kiwomya37'Wiekens (own goal 45', Beck 73'(pen) | 31,353 | 10 |
| 11 March 2000 | Grimsby Town | H | 1–0 | Beck (pen) | 10,450 | 9 |
| 18 March 2000 | Walsall | A | 3–2 | Lárusson (own goal), Wardley, Kiwomya | 6,414 | 10 |
| 22 March 2000 | Crystal Palace | H | 0–1 | | 12,842 | 10 |
| 25 March 2000 | Norwich City | H | 2–2 | Kiwomya (2) | 11,918 | 11 |
| 31 March 2000 | Charlton Athletic | A | 1–2 | Taylor | 19,617 | 11 |
| 8 April 2000 | Swindon Town | H | 2–1 | Ready 23', Beck 29 (pen) | 12,633 | 11 |
| 15 April 2000 | Crewe Alexandra | A | 1–2 | Langley | 4,741 | 11 |
| 22 April 2000 | Ipswich Town | H | 3–1 | Peacock, Koejoe, Kiwomya | 14,920 | 11 |
| 24 April 2000 | Tranmere Rovers | A | 1–1 | Peacock (pen) | 7,744 | 11 |
| 29 April 2000 | West Bromwich Albion | H | 0–0 | | 15,244 | 10 |
| 7 May 2000 | Portsmouth | A | 3–1 | Langley, Gallen, Myers (own goal) | 16,301 | 10 |

=== FA Cup ===
| Round | Date | Opponent | Venue | Result F–A | Attendance | Scorers |
|---|---|---|---|---|---|---|
| R3 | 10 December 1999 | Torquay United (Third Division) | H | 1–1 | 8,843 | Wardley 9' |
| R3R | 21 December 1999 | Torquay United (Third Division) | A | 3–2 | 5,232 | Wardley 56', 74' Kiwomya 71' |
| R4 | 8 January 2000 | Charlton Athletic (First Division) | A | 0–1 | 16,798 | |

=== Worthington Cup ===
| Round | Date | Opponent | Venue | Half time score | Result F–A | Attendance | Goalscorers |
|---|---|---|---|---|---|---|---|
| R1 1st Leg | 10 August 1999 | Cardiff City (Second Division) | A | 1-0 | 2–1 | 5,702 | Langley 32', Fowler 65' (own goal) |
| R1 2nd Leg | 25 August 1999 | Cardiff City (Second Division) | H | 0-1 | 1–2(lost 2-3 on pens) | 6,185 | Peacock 103'(pen) |

=== Friendlies ===
| Date | Opponents | Venue | Result F–A | Scorers | Attendance |
|---|---|---|---|---|---|
| 13-Jul-99 | Bournemouth v Queens Park Rangers | A | | | |
| 14-Jul-99 | Weymouth v Queens Park Rangers | A | | | |
| 17-Jul-99 | Basingstoke Town v Queens Park Rangers | A | | | |
| 20-Jul-99 | Queens Park Rangers v Sheffield Wednesday | H | | | |
| 24-Jul-99 | Brentford v Queens Park Rangers | | PP | | |
| 26-Jul-99 | Bristol Rovers v Queens Park Rangers | A | | | |
| 28-Jul-99 | Queens Park Rangers v Tottenham Hotspur | H | | | |
| 31-Jul-99 | Luton Town v Queens Park Rangers | A | | | |

== Squad ==
| Position | Nationality | Name | League Appearances | League Goals | Cup Appearances | Worthington Cup Goals | F.A.Cup Goals | Total Appearances | Total Goals |
|---|---|---|---|---|---|---|---|---|---|
| GK | CZE | Ludek Miklosko | 9 | | 2 | | | 11 | |
| GK | ENG | Lee Harper | 37 | | 3 | | | 40 | |
| GK | NIG | Ademola Bankole | | | 1 | | | 1 | |
| DF | ENG | Danny Maddix | 17 | 1 | 2 | | | 19 | 1 |
| DF | WAL | Karl Ready | 32 | 2 | 1 | | | 34 | 2 |
| DF | ENG | Jermaine Darlington | 34 | 2 | 4 | | | 38 | 2 |
| DF | ENG | Tim Breacker | 15 | 1 | 4 | | | 20 | 1 |
| DF | ENG | Leon Jeanne | 1 | | | | | 3 | |
| DF | IRL | Brian McGovern | 3 | | | | | 5 | |
| DF | ENG | Matthew Rose | 27 | 1 | 2 | | | 31 | 1 |
| DF | NIR | Steve Morrow | 6 | | 2 | | | 9 | |
| DF | ENG | Darren Ward | 14 | | 1 | | | 15 | |
| DF | AUS | George Kulcsar | 5 | | 1 | | | 14 | |
| DF | ENG | Chris Plummer | 17 | | 3 | | | 21 | |
| DF | ENG | Ian Baraclough | 45 | | 4 | | | 49 | |
| MF | ENG | Paul Murray | 21 | | 3 | | | 33 | |
| MF | ENG | Paul Bruce | 11 | | 3 | | | 15 | |
| MF | ENG | Keith Rowland | 5 | | | | | 17 | |
| MF | ENG | Mark Perry | 9 | | | | | 10 | |
| MF | ENG | Gavin Peacock | 26 | 8 | 2 | 1 | | 32 | 9 |
| MF | ENG | Richard Langley | 36 | 3 | 5 | 1 | | 46 | 4 |
| FW | ENG | Ross Weare | | | | | | 5 | |
| FW | WAL | Gareth Taylor | 2 | 1 | | | | 6 | 1 |
| FW | DEN | Mikkel Beck | 10 | 4 | | | | 11 | 4 |
| FW | IRE | Tony Scully | 2 | | | | | 10 | |
| FW | ENG | Kevin Gallen | 7 | 4 | 2 | | | 34 | 4 |
| FW | SWE | Rob Steiner | 24 | 6 | 3 | | | 27 | 6 |
| FW | ENG | Chris Kiwomya | 42 | 13 | 4 | | 1 | 48 | 14 |
| FW | NIR | Ian Dowie | | 1 | | | | 1 | 1 |
| FW | HOL | Sammy Koejoe | 5 | 1 | 1 | | | 13 | 1 |
| FW | ENG | Steve Slade | 3 | 1 | | | | 10 | 1 |
| FW | ENG | Stuart Wardley | 42 | 11 | 3 | | 3 | 46 | 14 |

== Transfers Out ==
| Name | from | Date | Fee | Date | Club | Fee |
|---|---|---|---|---|---|---|
| Vinnie Jones | Wimbledon | March 1998 | £750,000 | July 1999 | Retired | |
| Steve Yates | Bristol Rovers | 17 Aug 1993 | £650,000 | 6 August 1999 | Tranmere Rovers | Free |
| Mark Graham | Queens Park Rangers Juniors | June1993 | | Aug 99 | Cambridge U | Free |
| Richard Ord | Sunderland | 23 July 1998 | £675,000 | Nov 99 | Durham City | Free |
| David Whittle | Queens Park Rangers Juniors | 1 Mar 1997 | | Jan 00 | Waterford | Free |
| Brian McGovern | Arsenal | 23 Dec 1999 | Loan | Feb 00 | Arsenal | Loan |
| Ademola Bankole | Crewe Alexandra | July 1998 | | March 2000 | Bradford City | Loan |
| Karl Owen | Queens Park Rangers Juniors | Oct1996 | | Mar 00 | | Free |
| Darren Ward | Watford | 16 Dec 1999 | Loan | Mar 00 | Watford | Loan |
| Mikkel Beck | Derby | 10 Feb 2000 | Loan | Apr 00 | Derby | Loan |
| Gareth Taylor | Manchester C | 14 Mar 2000 | Loan | Apr 00 | Manchester C | Loan |
| Wayne Purser | Queens Park Rangers Juniors | 21 Apr 1997 | | May 00 | Barnet | Free |
| Rik Lopez | Queens Park Rangers Juniors | May1997 | | May 00 | União Leiria (Por) | Free |
| Michael Mahoney-Johnson | Queens Park Rangers Juniors | May1995 | | May 00 | Chesham U | Free |
| Steve Slade | Tottenham | 12 July 1996 | £350,000 | May 00 | Cambridge U | Free |
| Mario Lusardi | Queens Park Rangers Juniors | May1997 | | May 00 | Retired (knee inj.) | Free |
| Michael Currie | Queens Park Rangers Juniors | June1998 | | May 00 | Hayes | Free |

== Transfers In ==
| Name | from | Date | Fee |
|---|---|---|---|
| Stuart Wardley | Saffron Walden Town | 19 July 1999 | £15,000 |
| Robert Steiner | Bradford City | 26 July 1999 | £215,000 |
| Nikki Bull | Queens Park Rangers Juniors | Oct 1999 | |
| Samuel Koejoe | Red Bull Salzburg | 25 Nov 1999 | £250,000 |
| Brian McGovern | Arsenal | December 1999 | Loan |
| Danny Murphy | Queens Park Rangers Juniors | December 1999 | |
| Darren Ward | Watford | 16 Dec 1999 | Loan |
| Brian McGovern | Arsenal | 23 Dec 1999 | Loan |
| Gareth Taylor | Manchester City | March 2000 | Loan |
| Mikkel Beck | Derby County | 10 Feb 2000 | Loan |
| Richard Pacquette | Queens Park Rangers Juniors | February 2000 | |
| Gareth Taylor | Manchester C | 14 Mar 2000 | Loan |
| Clarke Carlisle | Blackpool | 24 May 2000 | £250,000 |
| Karl Connolly | Wrexham | 31 May 2000 | Free |
| Oliver Burgess | Queens Park Rangers Juniors | June2000 | |
| Christer Warren | Bournemouth | 15 June 2000 | Free |
