= 1998–99 Queens Park Rangers F.C. season =

English football club season

Queens Park Rangers
1998–99 season
- Chairman: Chris Wright
- Manager: Ray Harford (until 28 September); Iain Dowie (caretaker 28 September – 16 October); Gerry Francis (from 16 October)
- Stadium: Loftus Road
- First Division: 20th
- FA Cup: Third round
- League Cup: Second round
- Top goalscorer: League: Peacock/Sheron/Gallen (8); All: Sheron (9)
- Highest home attendance: 18,498 Vs Crystal Palace (9 May 1999)
- Lowest home attendance: 5,052 V Walsall (26 August 1998)
- Average home league attendance: 11,793
- Biggest win: 6-0 Vs Crystal Palace (9 May 1999)
- Biggest defeat: 1-4 Vs Oxford United (26 September 1998)
Home colours	Away colours

During the 1998–99 English football season, Queens Park Rangers F.C. competed in the Football League First Division.

== Season summary ==
After a poor start to the 1998–99 season, Harford was sacked in September and replaced by Gerry Francis, returning for his second spell as QPR manager. After another disappointing season, Francis managed to somehow keep them clear of the relegation zone on goals scored at the expense of Bury, with QPR finishing in 20th place with a final day 6-0 win over Crystal Palace proving crucial.

== Kit ==
Le Coq Sportif continued as QPR's kit manufacturers. Telecommunications giant Ericsson continued as kit sponsors.

== Final league table ==
Pos	Team	Pld	W	D	L	GF	GA	GD	Pts	Qualification or relegation
18	Crewe Alexandra	46	12	12	22	54	78	−24	48	
19	Portsmouth	46	11	14	21	57	73	−16	47	
20	Queens Park Rangers	46	12	11	23	52	61	−9	47	
21	Port Vale	46	13	8	25	45	75	−30	47	
22	Bury (R)	46	10	17	19	35	60	−25	47	Relegation to the Second Division

Rules for classification: 1) Points; 2) Goals scored; 3) Goal difference
(R) Relegated

== Results ==
Queens Park Rangers' score comes first

=== Legend ===
Win	Draw	Loss

=== Football League First Division ===
Date	Opponents	Venue	Result F–A	Scorers	Attendance	Position
8 August 1998	Sunderland	A	0–1		41,008	22
15 August 1998	Bristol City	H	1–1	Ready	13,337	20
22 August 1998	Norwich City	A	2–4	Peacock (pen), Sheron	16,317	20
29 August 1998	Bury	H	0–0		8,612	20
31 August 1998	Portsmouth	A	0–3		12,106	21
5 September 1998	Barnsley	H	PP			
8 September 1998	Tranmere Rovers	H	0–0		8,070	23
12 September 1998	Watford	A	1–2	Slade	14,251	23
19 September 1998	Stockport County	H	2–0	Gallen (2)	8,205	22
26 September 1998	Oxford United	A	1–4	Scully	7,489	23
29 September 1998	Wolverhampton Wanderers	A	2–1	Sheron (2)	20,201	21
3 October 1998	Grimsby Town	H	1–2	Maddix	10,240	23
10 October 1998	Ipswich Town	H	PP			
17 October 1998	Huddersfield Town	A	0–2		11,276	24
21 October 1998	West Bromwich Albion	A	0–2		11,842	24
25 October 1998	Birmingham City	H	0–1		10,272	24
31 October 1998	Swindon Town	A	1–3	Sheron 10'	8,500	24
4 November 1998	Barnsley	H	2–1	Langley, Gallen	8,218	23
7 November 1998	Bolton Wanderers	H	2–0	Gallen, Sheron	11,814	22
14 November 1998	Crewe Alexandra	A	2–0	Peacock, Sheron	5,001	21
21 November 1998	Sheffield United	H	1–2	Peacock (pen)	12,558	22
28 November 1998	Bradford City	A	3–0	Peacock, Gallen, Sheron	15,037	21
2 December 1998	Ipswich Town	H	1–1	Gallen	12,449	21
5 December 1998	Port Vale	H	3–2	Maddix, Talbot (own goal), Sheron	10,498	17
12 December 1998	Crewe Alexandra	H	0–1		11,296	17
19 December 1998	Crystal Palace	A	1–1	Steiner	17,684	19
26 December 1998	Norwich City	H	2–0	Murray, Peacock	15,251	18
28 December 1998	Barnsley	A	0–1		17,083	18
9 January 1999	Sunderland	H	2–2	Maddix, Gallen	17,444	17
16 January 1999	Bury	A	1–1	Dowie	4,609	17
30 January 1999	Portsmouth	H	1–1	Peacock	12,270	17
5 February 1999	Bristol City	A	0–0		13,841	18
13 February 1999	Tranmere Rovers	A	2–3	Maddix, Rowland	5,896	19
20 February 1999	Watford	H	1–2	Peacock	14,918	19
27 February 1999	Stockport County	A	0–0		7,694	19
3 March 1999	Oxford United	H	1-0	Steiner	9.040	19
6 March 1999	Wolverhampton Wanderers	H	0–1		13,150	19
9-Mar-99	Grimsby Town		PP			
13 March 1999	Bolton Wanderers	A	1–2	Rowland (pen)	17,919	19
20 March 1999	Swindon Town	H	4–0	Steiner 48', Kiwomya 51' 60', Rowland 81'	11,184	19
27 March 1999	Birmingham City	A	PP			
3 April 1999	Huddersfield Town	H	1–1	Baraclough	11,113	18
5 April 1999	Ipswich Town	A	1–3	Kiwomya	22,162	19
10 April 1999	West Bromwich Albion	H	2–1	Ready, Peacock	11,158	17
13 April 1999	Grimsby Town	A	0–1		4,789	18
17 April 1999	Sheffield United	A	0–2		14,341	19
20 April 1999	Birmingham City	A	0–1		20,888	19
24 April 1999	Bradford City	H	1–3	Gallen	11,641	19
1 May 1999	Port Vale	A	0–2		9,851	21
9 May 1999	Crystal Palace	H	6–0	Kulcsar, Kiwomya (3), Scully, Breacker	18,498	20

=== FA Cup ===
Round	Date	Opponent	Venue	Result F–A	Scorers	Attendance
R3	2 January 1999	Huddersfield Town (First Division)	H	0–1		11,685

=== Worthington Cup ===
Round	Date	Opponent	Venue	Result F–A	Scorers	Attendance
R1 1st Leg	11 August 1998	Walsall (Second Division)	A	0–0		3,691
R1 2nd Leg	26 August 1998	Walsall (Second Division)	H	3–1 Aet (Won 3-1 on agg)	Sheron 68', Maddix 99, Slade 114	5,052
R2 1st Leg	16 September 1998	Charlton Athletic (FA Premiership)	H	0–2		6,497
R2 2nd Leg	22 September 1998	Charlton Athletic (FA Premiership)	A	0–1 (lost 0–3 on agg)		11,726

=== Friendlies ===
Date	Opponents	Venue	Result F–A	Scorers	Attendance
18-Jul-98	Glentoran v Queens Park Rangers	A			
21-Jul-98	Portadown v Queens Park Rangers	A			
24-Jul-98	Millwall v Queens Park Rangers	A			
28-Jul-98	Brentford v Queens Park Rangers	A			
1-Aug-98	Queens Park Rangers v Tottenham Hotspur	H			

== Squad ==
Position	Nationality	Name	League Appearances	League Goals	Cup Appearances	Worthington Cup Goals	F.A.Cup Goals	Total Appearances	Total Goals
GK	CZE	Ludek Miklosko	31		1			32	
GK	ENG	Lee Harper	15		4			19	
DF	ENG	Danny Maddix	37	4	4	1		41	5
DF	WAL	Karl Ready	40	2	5			46	2
DF	ENG	Jermaine Darlington	4					4	
DF	ENG	Tim Breacker	18	1				18	1
DF	ENG	Leon Jeanne	7					10	
DF	FIN	Antti Heinola	23		4			27	
DF	ENG	Matthew Rose	27		2			31	
DF	NIR	Steve Morrow	24		1			25	
DF	ENG	Steve Yates	6		3			9	
DF	ENG	Andy Linighan	4					7	
DF	AUS	George Kulcsar	17	1				19	1
DF	ENG	Chris Plummer	8					10	
DF	ENG	Ian Baraclough	41	1	5			48	1
MF	ENG	Paul Murray	32	1	5			44	1
MF	ENG	Keith Rowland	16	3	2			31	3
MF	ENG	Mark Perry	1					1	
MF	ENG	Gavin Peacock	41	8	5			47	8
MF	ENG	Richard Langley	7	1				8	1
MF	NIR	Richard Graham						2	
MF	WAL	Vinnie Jones	1					2	
FW	IRE	Tony Scully	10	2	4			26	2
FW	ENG	Kevin Gallen	41	8	5			49	8
FW	SWE	Rob Steiner	5	3				12	3
FW	ENG	Chris Kiwomya	12	6				18	4
FW	NIR	Ian Dowie	7	1				21	1
FW	ENG	Steve Slade	10	1	3	1		25	2
FW	ENG	Mike Sheron	21	8	2	1		27	9

=== Left club during the season ===
Note: Flags indicate national team as defined under FIFA eligibility rules; some limited exceptions apply. Players may hold more than one non-FIFA nationality.

No.	Pos.	Nation	Player
—	MF	ENG	Nigel Quashie (Note: Quashie was born in Southwark, England, and represented them at U-21 and B level, but also qualified to represent Ghana internationally through his father and Scotland through his grandfather and would make his international debut for Scotland in May 2004.) (to Nottingham Forest)
—	MF	ENG	David Franklin (to Yeovil Town)
—	DF	ENG	Perry Norman (to Hayes)

No.	Pos.	Nation	Player
—	GK	IRL	Barry Andrews (to Leyton Orient)
—	FW	ENG	Mike Sheron (to Barnsley)

== Transfers Out ==
Name	from	Date	Fee	Date	Club	Fee
Trevor Challis	Queens Park Rangers Juniors	1 July 1994		July 1998	Bristol Rovers	Free*
David Bardsley	Oxford United	September 1989	Mark Stein plus £175,000	July 1998	Blackpool	Free*
Tony Roberts	Queens Park Rangers Juniors	24 July 1987		July 1998	Millwall	Free*
Nigel Quashie	Queens Park Rangers Juniors	20 July 1995		August 1998	Nottingham Forest	£2,500,000
Tim Breacker	West Ham	1 Oct 1998	Loan	Oct 98	West Ham	Loan
Mike Sheron	Stoke	1 July 1997	£2,350,000	Jan 99	Barnsley	£1,500,000
Rob Steiner	Bradford C	5 Nov 1998	Loan	Jan 99	Bradford C	Loan
Rob Steiner	Bradford C	1 Mar 1999	Loan	Mar 99	Bradford C	Loan
Luke Cornwall	Fulham	25 Mar 1999	Loan	May 99	Fulham	Loan
Andy Linighan	Crystal P	25 Mar 1999	Loan	May 99	Crystal P	Loan
Richard Hurst	Queens Park Rangers Juniors	May1995		June 99	Kingstonian	Free
Matthew Cass	Queens Park Rangers Juniors	Oct1998		June 99		Free

== Transfers In ==
Name	from	Date	Fee
Ademola Bankole	Crewe Alexandra	1 July 1998	Free
Richard Ord	Sunderland	23 July 1998	£675,000
Chris Kiwomya	Arsenal	27 Aug 1998	Free
Luděk Mikloško	West Ham United	1 Oct 1998	Loan Then £50,000
Tim Breacker	West Ham United	1 Oct 1998	Loan
Matthew Cass	Queens Park Rangers Juniors	Oct1998	
Robert Steiner	Bradford City	5 Nov 1998	Loan
Alvin Bubb	Queens Park Rangers Juniors	16 Nov 1998	
Tim Breacker	West Ham United	9 Feb 1999	Free
Rob Steiner	Bradford C	1 Mar 1999	Loan
Ross Weare	East End U	25 Mar 1999	£5,000
Luke Cornwall	Fulham	25 Mar 1999	Loan
Jermaine Darlington	Aylesbury United	25 Mar 1999	£25,000
Andy Linighan	Crystal P	25 Mar 1999	Loan
Carlos Brown	Queens Park Rangers Juniors	June1999	
