= 1997–98 Queens Park Rangers F.C. season =

English football club season

Queens Park Rangers
1997–98 season
- Chairman: Chris Wright
- Manager: Stewart Houston (until 10 November); John Hollins (caretaker from 11 November – 5 December); Ray Harford (from 5 December)
- Stadium: Loftus Road
- First Division: 21st
- FA Cup: Third round
- League Cup: First round
- Southern Junior Floodlight Cup: Finalist
- Top goalscorer: Mike Sheron (11)
- Highest home attendance: 17,614 Vs Ipswich Town (9 August 1997)
- Lowest home attendance: 8,355 Vs Wolverhampton Wanderers (12 August 1997)
- Average home league attendance: 13,083
- Biggest win: 5-0 Vs Middlesbrough (4 March 1998)
- Biggest defeat: 0–4 Vs Nottingham Forest (30 August 1997)
Home colours	Away colours

During the 1997–98 English football season, Queens Park Rangers F.C. competed in the Football League First Division.

== Season summary ==
In the 1997–98 season, QPR did start the campaign brightly but in November, Houston was sacked as manager with the club in 13th place and only four points adrift from the playoff places. Ray Harford was appointed as Houston's replacement and QPR went on to struggle with only three wins through to the end of the season and only managed to avoid relegation by one point at the expense of Manchester City (where Jamie Pollock scored an infamous own goal ), Stoke City and Reading.

In the Southern Junior Floodlight Cup, QPR's junior team reached the final versus Arsenal.

== Kit ==
Le Coq Sportif became QPR's new kit manufacturers. Telecommunications giant Ericsson continued as kit sponsors.

== Final league table ==
Pos	Team	Pld	W	D	L	GF	GA	GD	Pts	Qualification or relegation
19	Port Vale	46	13	10	23	56	66	−10	49	
20	Portsmouth	46	13	10	23	51	63	−12	49	
21	Queens Park Rangers	46	10	19	17	51	63	−12	49	
22	Manchester City (R)	46	12	12	22	56	57	−1	48	Relegation to the Second Division
23	Stoke City (R)	46	11	13	22	44	74	−30	46	Relegation to the Second Division

Source: Statto.com
Rules for classification: 1) Points; 2) Goals scored; 3) Goal difference
(R) Relegated

== Results ==
Queens Park Rangers' score comes first

=== Legend ===
Win	Draw	Loss

=== Football League First Division ===
Date	Opponents	Venue	Result F–A	Scorers	Attendance	Position
9 August 1997	Ipswich Town	H	0–0		17,614	15
15 August 1997	Tranmere Rovers	A	1–2	Peacock	7,467	16
23 August 1997	Stockport County	H	2–1	Sinclair (2)	11,108	10
30 August 1997	Nottingham Forest	A	0–4		18,804	12
2 September 1997	Reading	A	2–1	Spencer Swales (own goal)	10,203	11
6 September 1997	Portsmouth	H	pp			
13 September 1997	West Bromwich Albion	H	2–0	Sheron, Peacock	14,399	10
20 September 1997	Crewe Alexandra	A	3–2	Spencer, Maddix, Sinclair	5,348	9
24 September 1997	Portsmouth	H	1–0	Spencer	12,620	2
27 September 1997	Port Vale	A	0–2		7,197	3
4 October 1997	Charlton Athletic	H	2–4	Sheron (2)	14,825	7
11 October 1997	Norwich City	H	pp			
18 October 1997	Sheffield United	A	2–2	Murray, Morrow	18,006	8
21 October 1997	Bury	A	1–1	Spencer	4,602	9
26 October 1997	Manchester City	H	2–0	Ready13', Peacock 33 '(pen)	14,451	8
1 November 1997	Birmingham City	H	1–1	Barker	12,715	8
5 November 1997	Swindon Town	A	1–3	Peacock 14'	10,132	12
8 November 1997	Middlesbrough	A	0–3		30,067	13
15 November 1997	Stoke City	H	1–1	Barker (pen)	11,923	13
22 November 1997	Huddersfield Town	H	2–1	Quashie (2)	16,066	10
29 November 1997	Wolverhampton Wanderers	A	2–3	Sheron, Peacock	23,645	12
3 December 1997	Norwich City	H	1–1	Peacock	10,141	11
6 December 1997	Sunderland	H	0–1		15,266	12
12 December 1997	Oxford United	A	1–3	Peacock	6,664	13
21 December 1997	Bradford City	H	1–0	Peacock (pen)	8,853	12
26 December 1997	Portsmouth	A	1–3	Sheron	12,314	12
28 December 1997	Reading	H	1–1	Spencer	13,015	12
10 January 1998	Ipswich Town	A	0–0		12,672	13
17 January 1998	Tranmere Rovers	H	0–0		12,033	13
24 January 1998	Nottingham Forest	H	pp			
28 January 1998	Nottingham Forest	H	0–1		13,220	14
31 January 1998	Stockport County	A	0–2		7,958	17
7 February 1998	Crewe Alexandra	H	3–2	Kennedy (2), Ready	13,429	15
14 February 1998	West Bromwich Albion	A	1–1	Dowie	19,143	15
17 February 1998	Charlton Athletic	A	1–1	Peacock (pen)	15,555	15
21 February 1998	Port Vale	H	0–1		14,198	15
25 February 1998	Sheffield United	H	2–2	Sheron, Ready	9,560	15
28 February 1998	Norwich City	A	0–0		12,730	16
4 March 1998	Middlesbrough	H	5–0	Vickers (own goal), Bruce, Gallen, Sheron (2)	11,580	15
7 March 1998	Birmingham City	A	0–1		18,298	16
14 March 1998	Swindon Town	H	1–2	Quashie 8'	13,486	16
21 March 1998	Stoke City	A	1–2	Barker (pen)	11,051	18
28 March 1998	Huddersfield Town	A	1–1	Jones	13,681	19
1 April 1998	Wolverhampton Wanderers	H	0–0		12,337	17
10 April 1998	Sunderland	A	2–2	Sheron (2)	40,014	18
14 April 1998	Oxford United	H	1–1	Gallen	12,859	19
19 April 1998	Bradford City	A	1–1	Gallen	14,871	19
25 April 1998	Manchester City	A	2–2	Sheron 8', Pollock 21' (own goal)	32,040	18
3 May 1998	Bury	H	0–1		15,210	21

=== FA Cup ===
Round	Date	Opponent	Venue	Result F–A	Attendance	Scorers
R3	3 January 1998	Middlesbrough (First Division)	H	2–2	13,379	Spencer 6', Gallen 75'
R3R	13 January 1998	Middlesbrough (First Division)	A	0–2	21,817	

=== Coca-Cola Cup ===
Round	Date	Opponent	Venue	Result F–A	Attendance	Scorers
R1 First Leg	12 August 1997	Wolverhampton Wanderers (First Division)	H	0–2	8,355	
R1 Second Leg	27 August 1997	Wolverhampton Wanderers (First Division)	A	2–1 (lost 2–3 on agg)	18,398	Peacock 36', Murray 66'

=== Friendlies ===
Date		Opponents	Venue	Result F–A	Scorers	Attendance
11-Jul-97		St Albans City v Queens Park Rangers	A			
16-Jul-97		Exeter City v Queens Park Rangers	A			
18-Jul-97		Plymouth Argyle v Queens Park Rangers	A			
22-Jul-97		Gillingham v Queens Park Rangers	A			
25-Jul-97		Wycombe Wanderers v Queens Park Rangers	A			
29-Jul-97		Bournemouth v Queens Park Rangers	A			
2-Aug-97	Steve Potts Testimonial	West Ham United v Queens Park Rangers	A	0-2		
22-Mar-98	Simon Barker testimonial	Queens Park Rangers v Jamaica	H			

== Squad ==
Position	Nationality	Name	League Appearances	League Goals	Cup Appearances	Coca-Cola Cup Goals	F.A.Cup Goals	Total Appearances	Total Goals
GK	ENG	Lee Harper	36		3			39	
GK	WAL	Tony Roberts	10		1			11	
DF	ENG	Danny Maddix	23	1	2			27	1
DF	WAL	Karl Ready	38	3	2			41	3
DF	ENG	Neil Ruddock	7					7	
DF	ENG	Rufus Brevett	20		4			27	
DF	ENG	Matt Brazier	8		4			12	
DF	FIN	Antti Heinola						10	
DF	ENG	Matthew Rose	13		2			18	
DF	NIR	Steve Morrow	31	1	3			34	1
DF	ENG	Steve Yates	21		2			32	
DF	ENG	David Bardsley	12					12	
DF	AUS	George Kulcsar	11					12	
DF	ENG	Ian Baraclough	8					8	
MF	IRE	Mark Kennedy	8	2				8	2
MF	ENG	Paul Murray	31	1	4	1		36	2
MF	ENG	Keith Rowland	7					7	
MF	ENG	Simon Barker	20	3	2			25	3
MF	ENG	Mark Perry	6		2			10	
MF	ENG	Gavin Peacock	38	9	4	1		43	10
MF	ENG	Trevor Sinclair	24	3	4			30	3
MF	ENG	Mark Graham						1	
MF	ENG	Paul Bruce	1	1				6	1
MF	WAL	Vinnie Jones	7	1				7	1
FW	IRE	Tony Scully	7					7	
FW	ENG	Kevin Gallen	19	3			1	31	4
FW	ENG	Nigel Quashie	30	3	2			35	3
FW	ENG	Michael Mahoney-Johnson						1	
FW	NIR	Iain Dowie	9	1				11	
FW	SCO	John Spencer	22	5	3		1	26	6
FW	ENG	Steve Slade	3		1			26	
FW	ENG	Mike Sheron	36	11	2			42	11

== Transfers Out ==
Name	from	Date	Fee	Date	Club	Fee
Mark Hateley	Glasgow Rangers	3 November 1995	£1,500,000	July 1997	Rangers	£300,000
Alan McDonald	Queens Park Rangers Juniors	August 1981		July 1997	Swindon Town	Free
Danny Dichio	Queens Park Rangers Juniors	May 1993		July 1997	Sampdoria	Free
Andy Impey	Yeading	June 1990	£20,000	September 1997	West Ham United	£1,200,000
Juergen Sommer	Luton Town	29 August 1995	£600,000	1998	Columbus Crew	£200,000
Trevor Sinclair	Blackpool	13 Aug 1993	£600,000	January 1998	West Ham United	Iain Dowie, Keith Rowland and £2,300,000
Rufus Brevett	Doncaster Rovers	14 Feb 1991	£150,000	January 1998	Fulham	£375,000
Lee Charles	Chertsey Town	4 August 1995	£67,500	February 1998	Cambridge United	Loan
Michael Mahoney-Johnson	Queens Park Rangers Juniors	April 1995		February 1998	Brighton & Hove Albion	Loan
Tony Williams	Blackburn	5 Feb 1998	Loan	Mar 98	Blackburn	Loan
Matt Brazier	Queens Park Rangers Juniors	July 1994		March 1998	Fulham	£100,000
Jeff Woolsey	Arsenal	June1997	Free	Mar 98	Brighton	Free
Mark Kennedy	Liverpool	27 Jan 1998	Loan	Mar 98	Liverpool	Loan
John Spencer	Chelsea	21 Nov 1996	£2,500,000	March 1998	Everton	£1,500,000
Neil Ruddock	Liverpool	26 Mar 1998	Loan	May 98	Liverpool	Loan
Paul Hart	Queens Park Rangers Juniors	May1997		June 98	Barnet	Free
David Bardsley	Oxford U	14 Sep 1989	£475,000	June 98	Blackpool	Free
Simon Barker	Blackburn	20 July 1988	£400,000	June 98	Port Vale	Free
Lee Charles	Chertsey Town	4 Aug 1995	£67,500	June 98	Hayes	Free
Frazer Murray	Queens Park Rangers Juniors	June1997		June 98		Free

== Transfers In ==
Name	from	Date	Fee
Mike Sheron	Stoke City	July 1997	£2,350,000
George Kulcsar	Bradford City	16 Dec 1997	£250,000
Leon Jeanne	Queens Park Rangers Juniors	17 Nov 1997	
Iain Dowie	West Ham United	28 Jan 1998	With Keith Rowland and £2,300,000 For Trevor Sinclair
Keith Rowland	West Ham United	28 Jan 1998	With Iain Dowie and £2,300,000 For Trevor Sinclair
Mark Kennedy	Liverpool	27 Jan 1998	Loan
Antti Heinola	Heracles	12 Jan 1998	£100,000
Tony Williams	Blackburn	5 Feb 1998	Loan
Tony Scully	Manchester City	16 Mar 1998	£155,000
Ian Baraclough	Notts County	16 Mar 1998	£75,000
Vinnie Jones	Wimbledon	26 Mar 1998	£500,000
Neil Ruddock	Liverpool	26 Mar 1998	Loan
Terry McFlynn	Queens Park Rangers Juniors	11 May 1998	
Michael Currie	Queens Park Rangers Juniors	June1998	
