= Alexander Higgins =

Alexander Higgins may refer to:

- Alex Higgins (1949–2010), snooker player
- Alex Higgins (footballer, born 1863) (1863–1920), Scottish footballer
- Sandy Higgins (1888–1939), Scottish footballer
- Alexander Higgins (footballer, born 1870) (1870–?), English footballer
- Alex Higgins (footballer, born 1981), English footballer

== See also ==
- Alec Higgins (1908–1965), English rugby player
