= Clarke Carlisle =

English association football player

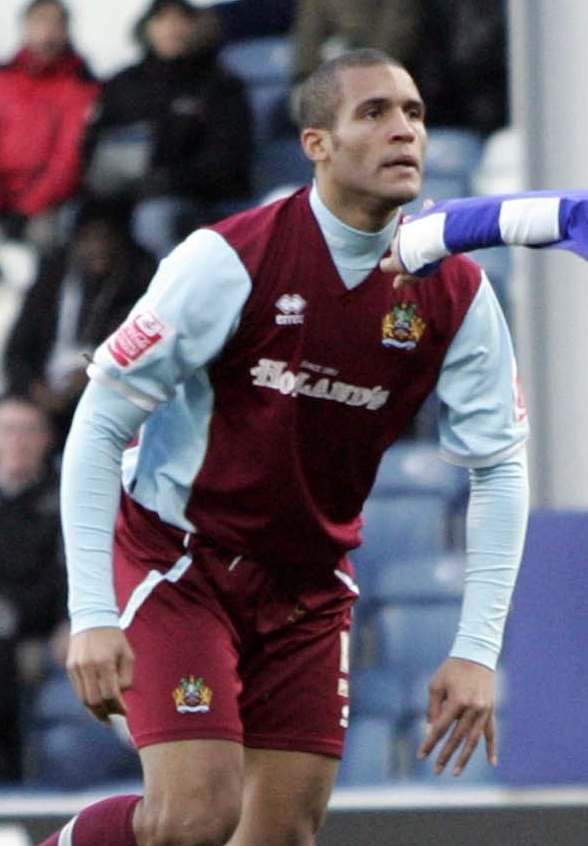
- Carlisle playing for Burnley in 2009

Personal information
- Full name: Clarke James Carlisle
- Date of birth: 14 October 1979 (age 47)
- Place of birth: Preston, England
- Height: 6 ft 3 in (1.91 m)
- Position: Defender

Youth career
- –1997: Blackpool

Senior career*
Years	Team	Apps	(Gls)
1997–2000	Blackpool	93	(7)
2000–2004	Queens Park Rangers	96	(6)
2004–2005	Leeds United	35	(4)
2005–2007	Watford	36	(3)
2007	→ Luton Town (loan)	5	(0)
2007–2012	Burnley	131	(7)
2011–2012	→ Preston North End (loan)	20	(3)
2012	→ Northampton Town (loan)	18	(1)
2012–2013	York City	10	(0)
2012–2013	→ Northampton Town (loan)	5	(0)
2013	Northampton Town	21	(3)
Total		470	(34)

International career
2000	England U21	3	(0)
- * Club domestic league appearances and goals

Clarke James Carlisle (born 14 October 1979) is an English former professional footballer who played as a defender and was chairman of the Professional Footballers' Association.

Born in Preston, he began playing football at a young age, taking inspiration from his father who played semi-professionally. Carlisle represented his home county of Lancashire at youth level. The start of his professional career was his Football League debut for Blackpool in September 1997. He moved to Queens Park Rangers in May 2000. In the same year, Carlisle won three caps for the England under-21 national team. He missed a number of matches for Queens Park Rangers due to a posterior cruciate ligament injury which at one stage led doctors to believe that his career was over. He then missed one month of the 2003–04 season because of an alcohol-related problem, and left Queens Park Rangers at the end of that season. In the summer of 2004, he joined Leeds United on a free transfer.

Carlisle spent just one season with Leeds United before signing for Championship club Watford in August 2005. In the 2005–06 season, his first with Watford, the team finished third in the division and achieved promotion to the Premier League via the play-offs. However, a thigh injury caused Carlisle to miss the majority of the team's season in the top flight. In March 2007 he had a one-month loan spell at Luton Town. In August 2007, Burnley manager Steve Cotterill bought Carlisle from Watford for a transfer fee of £200,000. In the 2008–09 season he played over 40 matches as Burnley reached the semi-finals of the League Cup and finished fifth in the league, earning a place in the play-offs. Carlisle was named man of the match for his performance in the play-off final as Burnley beat Sheffield United 1–0 to return to the top tier of English football for the first time in 33 years.

An imposing figure in the centre of defence thanks to his stature, Carlisle also provided an attacking threat from set pieces.

He is a practising Christian and regularly attends church. He attended Balshaw's Church of England High School where he attained 10 A-grades at GCSE and studied mathematics and politics at A-level, and in 2002 was awarded the title of "Britain's Brainiest Footballer" in a TV game show. He has been an ambassador for the Kick It Out campaign and is a former chairman of the management committee of the Professional Footballers' Association. Carlisle has suffered from recurring problems with alcohol and depression.

== Early life and education ==
Carlisle was born in Preston, Lancashire. He grew up in the city with his parents, Mervin and Rose (née Edgar). He went on to study A-level mathematics and politics at Ealing, Hammersmith and West London College while he was unable to play football due to an injury. Carlisle has a degree in Professional Sports Writing and Broadcasting from Staffordshire University, and has expressed interest in taking up teaching work following his football career.

== Club career ==
=== Early career ===
Carlisle was inspired to become a footballer by his father, Mervin, who played semi-professionally for Morecambe and Southport. Carlisle started playing at a young age and represented Lancashire at under-15 level, before being signed by Blackpool where he became a trainee with the youth team. Carlisle signed a professional contract with the club on 13 August 1997 and moved into the first-team squad. On 2 September 1997, he made his debut for Blackpool in the team's 4–3 victory over Wrexham in the Second Division. He scored his first goal as a professional footballer with the 90th-minute winner in the following match, a 2–1 win against Carlisle United at Blackpool's home ground, Bloomfield Road. He was shown the first red card of his career in Blackpool's 1–0 victory against Wigan Athletic in the quarter-final of the Football League Trophy on 27 January 1998. He played 12 matches in his first season, scoring two goals.

The following season, he played 43 matches as Blackpool achieved a 14th-placed finish in the Second Division. His single goal of the campaign came in a 3–1 victory over Stoke City at the Victoria Ground. In the 1999–2000 season, he played 51 times and scored five goals as Blackpool finished 22nd and were relegated to the Third Division. He scored on his 93rd and final league appearance for the club in a 1–1 draw with Oldham Athletic at Boundary Park. Despite the team's relegation, Carlisle's strong defensive performances during his three years at Blackpool attracted the attention of Iain Dowie, who at the time was a scout for Queens Park Rangers.

=== Queens Park Rangers ===
Dowie recommended Carlisle to Queens Park Rangers manager Gerry Francis, who paid a transfer fee of £250,000 to sign him on 25 May 2000. He played his first match for the team on 12 August 2000 in the 0–0 draw with Birmingham City at Loftus Road. He made a further 31 appearances in the 2000–01 season and scored three times, earning himself a call-up to the England national under-21 team. However, his season was cut short on 31 January 2001, when he suffered his first major injury after a tackle by Rufus Brevett during the 2–0 defeat to Fulham. It was found that Carlisle had torn his posterior cruciate ligament, an injury which kept him sidelined for a year and caused doctors to believe that his career might be over. While he was out of action, Queens Park Rangers suffered relegation to the Second Division after finishing 23rd in the league. Soon after the injury he attempted suicide, and years later was diagnosed with major depressive disorder. Upon his return to football, Carlisle was injured again in a reserve-team match against Bristol City, sparking fears that he had aggravated his previous injury. The damage proved not to be particularly severe, although it delayed his return to training by a further month.

"With the knowledge I have now, I realise it had been affecting my performance for a long time, I had been playing at nowhere near 100%. And there was the actual thoughts I was having at the time. At one stage I found I wasn't actually that bothered. Then I suddenly had a moment of clarity and thought: 'Clarke, what the hell are you doing?' It was when clarity set in that I felt my lowest. To be honest, I was scared."

— Clarke Carlisle on his alcohol problem in 2003

After missing the entire 2001–02 campaign, Carlisle returned to competitive football on 7 September 2002 in Queens Park Rangers' 4–0 victory over Mansfield Town. He scored two goals in 41 matches in the 2002–03 season, helping the team to a fourth-placed finish and a spot in the Second Division play-offs. The club reached the 2003 Second Division play-off final, but were defeated 1–0 by Cardiff City at the Millennium Stadium on 25 May 2003. During the following season, Carlisle developed personal problems, including an alcohol addiction, although he continued to play for a number of months. He subsequently missed one month of the season after being admitted to Sporting Chance, a clinic run by former England international footballer Tony Adams, for 28 days for treatment for alcohol-related problems. Upon his return to the team, Carlisle won the Second Division Player of the Month award for November 2003. He scored one goal in 39 matches in 2003–04 as Queens Park Rangers finished as runners-up in the league, achieving promotion to the Championship. Carlisle's contract with Queens Park Rangers ended at the conclusion of the 2003–04 campaign.

=== Leeds United ===
In June 2004, Carlisle agreed to join recently relegated Championship club Leeds United on a free transfer. He was offered a new contract by Queens Park Rangers, but he was keen to return to northern England and cut short his summer holiday in Tenerife to sign for the West Yorkshire club on a two-year contract. His contract with Leeds began on 1 July 2004, and he made his debut for the club in the 1–1 draw with Nottingham Forest on 21 August. He scored his first goal for Leeds two matches later, netting the first goal in the team's 3–0 victory against Coventry City. He was a regular in the team during the first half of the season, playing in every match from the start of September until the end of November. However, he then experienced another major injury set-back, tearing his ankle ligaments during the 1–0 defeat to Rotherham United on 29 November 2004, an injury which left him out of action for a number of weeks.

When fit again, Carlisle found it difficult to break into the first team as his place in the centre of defence had been taken by Matthew Kilgallon. His return came on 28 December 2004, when he was brought on as an 80th-minute substitute for Frazer Richardson in the 2–1 win against Plymouth Argyle. He started the next league match, against Coventry City, but was shown a red card late on in the 2–1 victory at Highfield Road. After his return from suspension, he was dropped from the team, making just a handful of substitute appearances in the following two months. Carlisle regained his place in the team towards the end of the season, starting in each of the final four matches of the campaign. He left Leeds in the summer of 2005, having spent one season at the club, playing 38 matches and scoring four times for the team as they reached the third round of the League Cup and attained a 14th-placed finish in the league. At the end of the 2004–05 campaign it was revealed that two clubs, Watford and Stoke City, were both competing to sign Carlisle. Leeds United accepted bids of £100,000 from both clubs but Carlisle chose to sign for Watford, and he agreed a three-year contract with the club on 5 August 2005. The deal taking him to Vicarage Road included a clause in his contract stipulating that he would not be played against Leeds in the following season.

=== Watford and Luton Town ===
"Clarke is a brilliant guy and if his football ability matched his personality, he would be captain of England!"

— Aidy Boothroyd

Watford manager Aidy Boothroyd, who had been a coach at Leeds during the previous season, was pleased with the signing, stating that Carlisle was "exactly the type of defender I wanted". Carlisle was placed straight into Watford's starting line-up and played his first match for his new club on 6 August 2005, but he could not prevent the team losing 2–1 to Preston North End at Vicarage Road. On 29 August 2005, Carlisle scored his first goal for the club, claiming the winning header in a 2–1 victory over Derby County at Pride Park. Soon after, Carlisle scored two goals in a competitive match for the first time in his career, grabbing both in Watford's 2–1 win against Wolverhampton Wanderers in the second round of the League Cup.

On 4 November 2005, Wolverhampton Wanderers manager Glenn Hoddle accused Carlisle of stamping on goalkeeper Michael Oakes in the match the previous weekend, and threatened to report him to the Football Association. However, the referee did not show Carlisle a red or yellow card during the match, and no further action was taken against the player. During the 2005–06 campaign, Carlisle made 35 appearances and scored five goals, helping Watford to achieve a place in the play-offs after finishing third in the Championship. However, towards the end of the season he suffered yet another injury, being forced off the pitch in Watford's penultimate league match away at Queens Park Rangers. The thigh problem caused him to be unavailable for the play-offs as Watford defeated Leeds 3–0 at the Millennium Stadium to win promotion to the FA Premier League.

The injury forced Carlisle to miss the first eight months of the 2006–07 Premier League season, and he eventually returned to full training in February 2007. He played in two reserve team matches for Watford in order to regain some fitness, hoping to break into the first team and make his Premier League debut. On 2 March 2007, Carlisle joined local rivals Luton Town on a one-month emergency loan deal in an attempt to return to full match fitness. He made his debut for Luton the following day in the 3–2 away defeat to Wolverhampton Wanderers in the Championship, coming on as a substitute for Matthew Spring, who had himself joined the club from Watford earlier in the season after failing to break into the first team. Carlisle went on to play five matches for Luton. He made his final appearance on 31 March 2007, in a 0–0 draw with Burnley at Turf Moor, before returning to Watford on 2 April 2007. He finally played his first Premier League match on 9 April 2007, starting in the 4–2 victory over Portsmouth. He was selected to play in the team's following match, an FA Cup semi-final against Manchester United, but despite being named man of the match for his performance, Watford were defeated 4–1 at Villa Park. Carlisle went on to play in Watford's following three league matches of the season as their relegation back to the Championship was confirmed after a 1–1 draw with Manchester City at Vicarage Road.

=== Burnley and loan spells ===
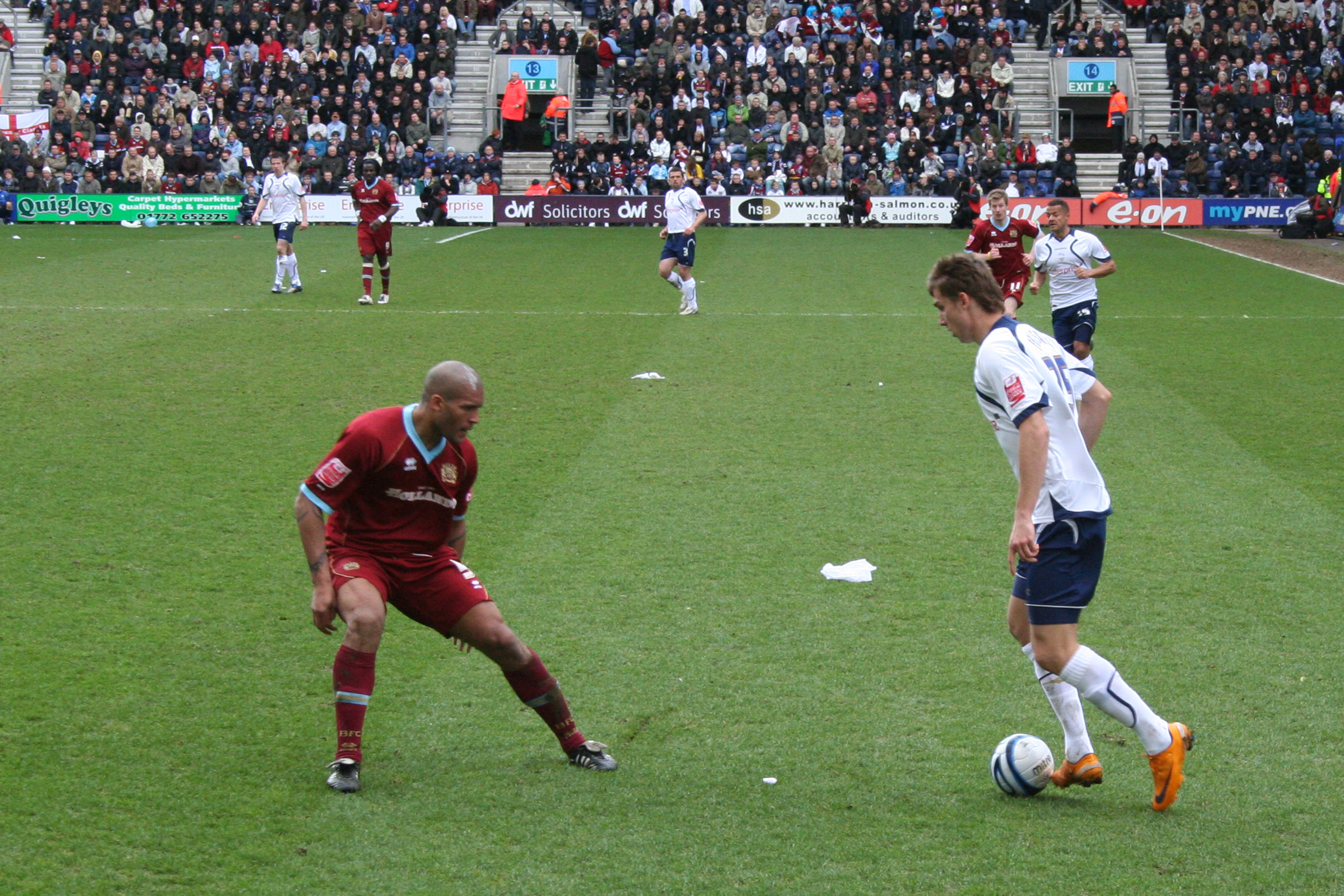
Carlisle (left) tries to tackle Preston North End forward Tamás Priskin in 2008

On 14 August 2007, Steve Cotterill, manager of fellow Championship club Burnley, made an offer of £200,000 for Carlisle, who signed a three-year contract at Turf Moor two days later. Helped along by the club captain Steven Caldwell, Carlisle settled in well at Burnley. Two days after signing, he made his debut for his new club in the 2–0 defeat away to Scunthorpe United. Carlisle scored his first goal for Burnley on 22 September 2007, netting a stoppage time minute equaliser with an overhead kick in the 2–2 draw with Bristol City at Ashton Gate. On 28 September 2007, the day before a Championship match, he was involved in a serious car crash after spinning and crashing into a ditch causing his car to be written off. Steve Cotterill praised Carlisle's character for playing the next day in the 1–1 draw with Crystal Palace. He and Caldwell formed a solid defensive partnership and played most matches of the season together. Carlisle was named in the official Team of the Week for his performance in Burnley's 3–1 away win at Charlton Athletic. His partnership with Caldwell was broken towards the end of the campaign as Carlisle was given suspensions after being sent off twice in his last four matches of the season, first in the 1–2 loss to Preston and then in the last match of the season, a 0–5 defeat at Crystal Palace. Carlisle ended the 2007–08 season with two goals in 35 appearances.

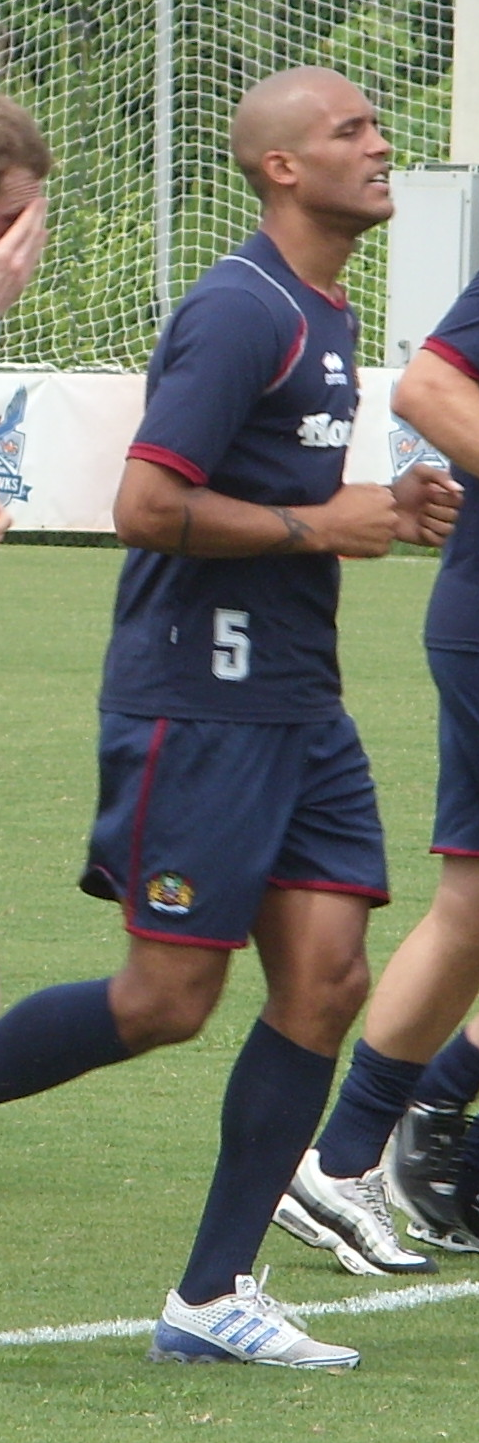
Carlisle training with Burnley in 2008

The 2008–09 campaign was Burnley's first full season with Owen Coyle as manager. Carlisle managed to keep his place in the team under the new regime and was a regular fixture in the team for the first six months of the season. However, he was dropped from the team for the match against Charlton on 31 January 2009 due to a lack of form. He remained out of the team for the whole of February 2009. He made his return to action on 3 March 2009, starting in the centre of defence in the 1–0 win over his old team, Blackpool, at Bloomfield Road. On his next league appearance he scored Burnley's first goal in a 4–2 victory against Crystal Palace at Turf Moor. He went on to score three further goals in the last two months of the season, getting his name on the scoresheet against Nottingham Forest, Southampton and his former team, Queens Park Rangers. His goals helped Burnley to a fifth-placed finish in the Championship, and a place in the play-offs. He played in both legs of the semi-final against Reading as the team won 3–0 on aggregate to secure a place in the play-off final at Wembley Stadium. Carlisle was handed the man of the match award for his performance as Burnley triumphed 1–0 against Sheffield United to earn promotion to the Premier League for the 2009–10 season.

"I'm privileged to be a member of this magnificent team. What a season, words can't describe how brilliant and awesome an achievement this is. I thank God so much, I'm blessed to be a part of this team. It's just unbelievable, what an awesome day."

— Clarke Carlisle on Burnley's promotion in 2009

Prior to the start of the campaign, Carlisle stated his belief that Burnley could avoid relegation back to the Championship. He was selected in the team to play Burnley's first top-flight match in 33 years on 15 August 2009, when the team were defeated 2–0 by Stoke City at the Britannia Stadium. He also played in the following match as Burnley recorded their first ever Premier League victory, a 1–0 win over reigning champions Manchester United at Turf Moor. During the early part of the season, he formed a defensive pairing with new signing André Bikey. He was reunited with Caldwell in the centre of defence for the 2–1 victory over Birmingham on 3 October 2009. In the away loss to Wolverhampton Wanderers on 20 December 2009, Carlisle suffered a groin injury which kept him sidelined over the Christmas period. After over a month out of the Burnley team with the injury, he made his first start under new manager Brian Laws in the 1–0 defeat to Bolton Wanderers on 26 January 2010. Although the team was relegated from the Premier League at the end of the season, Carlisle was one of several players offered a new contract, and he signed a two-year extension in May 2010.

In the first away match of the 2010–11 season, he scored an injury-time equaliser against Ipswich Town; the goal was Burnley's first from a corner kick for 15 months. After serving a three-match suspension in October 2010 following a red card in the 1–1 draw away at Millwall, Carlisle returned to the team for the League Cup tie against Aston Villa and scored an 89th-minute equaliser to take the match to extra time. He made 41 appearances during the campaign but was not deemed a first-choice player by new manager Eddie Howe, and in July 2011 he joined his hometown club Preston North End on loan for the duration of the 2011–12 season.

Carlisle made his Preston debut in the opening match of the campaign, a 4–2 home defeat against Colchester on 6 August 2011. Three matches later, he scored his first goal for the club, netting the opening goal from a corner kick in the 2–0 away win over Chesterfield. He was a regular starter for Preston during the opening months of the season and also played in the cup competitions as the team reached the third round of the League Cup before being eliminated by Southampton and progressed to the same stage of the Football League Trophy with penalty shoot-out victories over Morecambe and Rochdale. He was handed a one-match ban after receiving his fifth yellow card of the campaign in the FA Cup first round defeat to Southend United on 22 November 2011. Preston manager Phil Brown brought in Jamie McCombe on loan as cover for Carlisle, and the Huddersfield Town loanee kept his place in the starting line-up throughout December 2011. Carlisle returned to the Preston team for the visit to Rochdale on 2 January 2012, when he was selected to play alongside Craig Morgan by caretaker managers Graham Alexander and David Unsworth. He played five times during that month, scoring on his 27th and final appearance for the club in the 1–2 loss to Yeovil Town. Following the appointment of Graham Westley as Preston manager, Carlisle struggled to fit the new training regime in with his commitments as chairman of the Professional Footballers' Association and his loan deal was cancelled by mutual consent on 31 January 2012.

Later the same day, Carlisle signed for League Two club Northampton Town, managed by former Watford boss Aidy Boothroyd, on loan for the remainder of the season. He made his first start for Northampton in the 1–0 win over AFC Wimbledon at the Sixfields Stadium on 14 February 2012. Carlisle was appointed captain upon his arrival at the club and was a regular first team player, often playing alongside fellow centre-back Kelvin Langmead. He scored his first goal for the team in the 3–1 home defeat to Bradford City on 14 April 2012. Carlisle played 18 matches and scored one goal for Northampton during his three months with the club, making his final appearance in the final match of the campaign, a 1–1 draw away at Rotherham. He was released by Burnley in May 2012 after the expiry of his contract.

=== York City and Northampton Town return ===
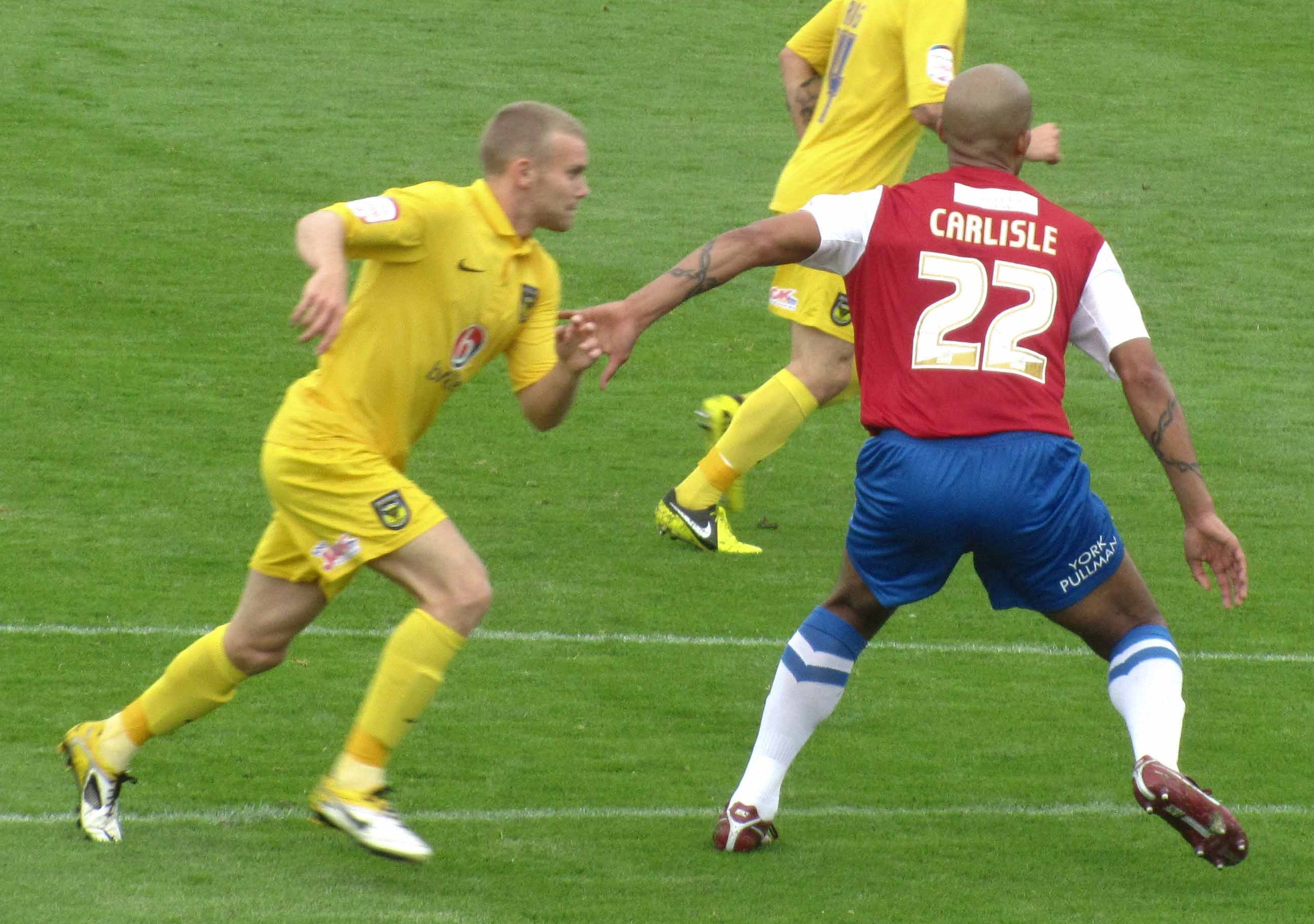
Carlisle (right) playing for York City in 2012

Carlisle signed for newly promoted League Two club York City on 30 August 2012 on a contract lasting until January 2013, having previously turned down a contract offer from Northampton. He made his debut two days later in York's 3–1 victory at home to Oxford United. On 19 November 2012, Carlisle re-signed for Northampton on loan until January 2013, when he would sign permanently, having made 14 appearances for York. He made his second debut the following day in Northampton's 3–0 home win over Morecambe. After making five appearances on loan, Carlisle completed his permanent move to Northampton on a one-and-a-half-year contract on 4 January 2013. He played for Northampton in their 3–0 defeat to Bradford in the 2013 League Two play-off final at Wembley Stadium on 18 May 2013. Five days later, Carlisle announced his retirement from playing.

== International career ==
While playing for Queens Park Rangers, Carlisle was selected to play for the England national under-21 team on three occasions. He was called up to the squad by Howard Wilkinson, and made his debut for his country on 31 August 2000, coming on as a substitute in England's 6–1 friendly victory over Georgia at the Riverside Stadium in Middlesbrough. His second appearance for England, also from the substitutes' bench, came in a 2002 UEFA European Under-21 Championship qualifying match on 6 October 2000 in the 1–1 draw with Germany at Pride Park. He played his third and final match for England four days later, again coming on as a substitute in the 2–2 draw with Finland at the Tehtaan kenttä stadium in Valkeakoski. Despite playing well in the second half of the match, he was not selected for the under-21 team again.

== Style of play ==
Carlisle's predominant playing position is as a centre-back and he has been described as a "defensive lynchpin". He has stated that as a youngster, he modelled his style of play on defenders such as Steve Bruce and Gary Pallister. However, he says that their style was too "ruthless" for modern football, and he now attempts to read the opponents' attacking plays. He is not known for his pace, and this has caused him some disciplinary problems as he has received eight red cards during his career. Former Leeds United teammate Michael Duberry described Carlisle as a "strong" defender. Carlisle is recognised as being a highly intelligent footballer, and is often seen as an imposing figure in the centre of the defence thanks to his 6 ft 3 in (1.91 m) stature. He also looks to use his size to cause an attacking threat from set pieces such as free kicks and corner kicks, and scored 39 goals in his career.

== PFA roles ==
Carlisle is an ambassador for the Kick It Out scheme, which campaigns for inclusion and equality in football. He was also on the Management Committee of the Professional Footballers' Association (PFA), and it was announced on 17 November 2010 that Carlisle would succeed Chris Powell as the chairman of the PFA. Carlisle was among those who criticised FIFA president Sepp Blatter following his comments in November 2011 that racism was no longer a problem in football. In February 2012, he was part of a PFA delegation that met with British prime minister David Cameron to discuss the issues of racism and homophobia in the sport.

== Media work ==
In October 2009, Carlisle made his first appearance on the BBC television football programme Match of the Day 2. He has since appeared as a pundit for Sky Sports and ITV Sport during numerous televised football matches. Carlisle has made two appearances on the BBC panel debate show Question Time, becoming the first footballer to appear on the programme. In July 2012, he presented a documentary on BBC Three titled Is Football Racist?, in which he interviewed former footballers Stan Collymore, Chris Hughton and John Barnes about their experiences of racism during their careers, as well as investigating the history of racism in English football on the pitch and in the stands. He also presented a second documentary for BBC Three, Football's Suicide Secret, on the issue of mental health in football on 9 July 2013. He published his autobiography, You Don't Know Me, But... A Footballer's Life in 2013. In 2025 Carlisle appeared on the 1% Club for Soccer Aid, winning the show with a pass remaining, earning UNICEF and Soccer Aid £100,000 plus a bonus £1,000 for not using his pass in the show.

== Personal life ==
From an early age, Carlisle was encouraged to follow Christianity by his parents. He adopted those beliefs, and became a regular churchgoer during his time at Watford. Carlisle was married to Gemma, whom he met just prior to his admission to the Sporting Chance clinic. The couple married on the island of Antigua, where some of Carlisle's family also resides. The couple lived in Ripponden, West Yorkshire with their son, born in 2007, and daughter, born 2010. Carlisle also has a daughter, born in 1999, from a previous relationship. He is close friends with Adebayo Akinfenwa, his former teammate at Northampton.

On 30 January 2002, Carlisle was awarded the accolade of "Britain's Brainiest Footballer" in a television quiz. Carlisle appeared as a contestant on the Channel 4 game show Countdown on 24 February 2010, winning his first match against the defending champion to stay on the show for the following programme. Carlisle then won his second contest, achieving a larger score than the previous day to stay on for another match. In his third match on 26 February 2010, he was defeated by three points.

He was banned from driving for one year and eight months and fined £2,365 after pleading guilty of drink driving at Bury Magistrates Court on 11 October 2011.

On the morning of 22 December 2014, Carlisle was hit by a lorry on the A64 near Bishopthorpe, North Yorkshire, and was airlifted to Leeds General Infirmary having suffered cuts, bruises, internal bleeding, a broken rib and a shattered left knee. He had surgery soon after and his wife reported that he was "very poorly" but "alive and stable". Burnley and Liverpool supporters performed a minute's applause in support of Carlisle starting in the fifth minute of their match on 26 December 2014, in reference to Carlisle wearing the number five shirt for Burnley. On 30 December 2014, it was announced that Carlisle was charged with a drink-driving offence on 20 December 2014. He appeared at Highbury Corner Magistrates' Court on 20 January 2015. In February 2015, after leaving hospital, Carlisle said that he had been trying to kill himself when he was hit by the lorry in December 2014.

Carlisle and his wife Gemma separated in early 2015 over his depression and recent suicide attempt. On 14 May 2015, Clarke was banned from driving for three years, ordered to carry out 150 hours unpaid work and pay £145 in costs.

On 15 September 2017, Carlisle was reported missing, having last been seen earlier that day in Manchester city centre. That evening, Preston police reported that he had been found safe in Liverpool. He later explained that he was intent on taking his own life that day and was deciding how to do so. Some nearby people intervened and kept him from hurting himself.

He and his wife Carrie (née Armstrong), a TV presenter and columnist, are mental health advocates.

== Career statistics ==
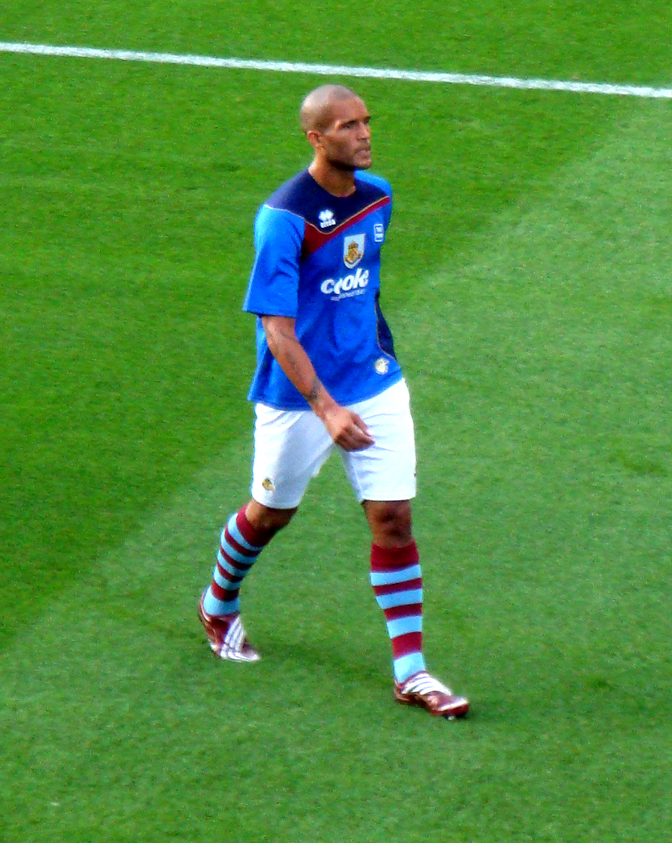
Carlisle training with Burnley in 2009

Appearances and goals by club, season and competition
Club	Season	League			FA Cup		League Cup		Other		Total	
Club	Season	Division	Apps	Goals	Apps	Goals	Apps	Goals	Apps	Goals	Apps	Goals
Blackpool	1997–98	Second Division	11	2	0	0	0	0	1 (Note: Appearance(s) in Football League Trophy)	0	12	2
Blackpool	1998–99	Second Division	39	1	0	0	3	0	1	0	43	1
Blackpool	1999–2000	Second Division	43	4	3	1	2	0	3	0	51	5
Blackpool	Total		93	7	3	1	5	0	5	0	106	8
Queens Park Rangers	2000–01	First Division	27	3	3	0	2	0	—		32	3
Queens Park Rangers	2001–02	Second Division	0	0	0	0	0	0	—		0	0
Queens Park Rangers	2002–03	Second Division	36	2	2	0	1	0	2 (Note: Appearances in Second Division play-offs)	0	41	2
Queens Park Rangers	2003–04	Second Division	33	1	1	0	2	0	3	0	39	1
Queens Park Rangers	Total		96	6	6	0	5	0	5	0	112	6
Leeds United	2004–05	Championship	35	4	0	0	3	0	—		38	4
Watford	2005–06	Championship	32	3	1	0	2	2	0	0	35	5
Watford	2006–07	Premier League	4	0	1	0	0	0	—		5	0
Watford	Total		36	3	2	0	2	2	0	0	40	5
Luton Town (loan)	2006–07	Championship	5	0	—		—		—		5	0
Burnley	2007–08	Championship	33	2	0	0	2	0	—		35	2
Burnley	2008–09	Championship	36	4	4	0	5	0	3 (Note: Appearances in Championship play-offs)	0	48	4
Burnley	2009–10	Premier League	27	0	0	0	1	0	—		28	0
Burnley	2010–11	Championship	35	1	3	1	3	1	—		41	3
Burnley	Total		131	7	7	1	11	1	3	0	152	9
Preston North End (loan)	2011–12	League One	20	3	2	0	3	0	2	0	27	3
Northampton Town (loan)	2011–12	League Two	18	1	—		—		—		18	1
York City	2012–13	League Two	10	0	2	0	—		2	0	14	0
Northampton Town	2012–13	League Two	26	3	—		—		3 (Note: Appearances in League Two play-offs)	0	29	3
Career total			470	34	22	2	29	3	20	0	541	39

== Honours ==
Queens Park Rangers

- Football League Second Division second-place promotion: 2003–04

Burnley

- Football League Championship play-offs: 2009

Non-profit organization positions
Preceded by Chris Powell	Chairman of the Professional Footballers' Association; 2010–2013	Succeeded by Ritchie Humphreys
