= Stuart Wardley =

English footballer (born 1974)

Personal information
- Full name: Stuart James Wardley
- Date of birth: 10 September 1975 (age 51)
- Place of birth: Cambridge, England
- Position: Midfielder

Senior career*
Years	Team	Apps	(Gls)
- Saffron Walden Town
1997–1998	Bishops Stortford		
1998–1999	Saffron Walden Town		
1999–2002	Queens Park Rangers	87	(14)
2002	→ Rushden & Diamonds (loan)	18	(4)
2002–2004	Rushden & Diamonds	39	(6)
2004	Torquay United	7	(2)
2004–2005	Leyton Orient	6	(0)
2005	Cambridge United	3	(0)
2005	Saffron Walden Town		
2005	Bedford Town		
2009–2012	Haverhill Rovers		
2013–2018	Saffron Walden Town		

Managerial career
- 2008: Bishop's Stortford Swifts
- 2013–2018: Saffron Walden Town
- 2019: Haverhill Rovers
- * Club domestic league appearances and goals

Stuart James Wardley (born 10 September 1975) is an English former professional football midfielder.

== Career ==
Wardley played for non-league Saffron Walden Town, Bishops Stortford and Saffron Walden again, while working as removals, before joining Queens Park Rangers in July 1999 for a fee of £15,000. His debut came on 7 August 1999 when he was a late substitute, for Jermaine Darlington in Rangers' 3–1 win at home to Huddersfield Town.

In January 2002, Wardley joined Rushden & Diamonds on loan, signing on a free transfer in April 2002. He missed most of the 2003–04 season due to a serious knee injury. He played pre-season for Bishop Stortford and in August 2004 joined Torquay United on a one-month contract. He signed a three-month contract extension in September 2004, but left in October 2004 to join Leyton Orient. He moved to Cambridge United on non-contract terms in January 2005, playing just three times before being released after a month. He had a trial with Rushden in February 2005, but was not offered a contract.

He played for Saffron Walden Town before signing for Bedford Town in March 2005. He left Bedford at the end of the season.

In 2008, he was appointed as joint-manager of Bishops Stortford Swifts.

In September 2008, he was playing for Debden, and from the start of the 2009 season he has played for Haverhill Rovers, scoring on his debut for the club in a 1–1 draw with Dereham Town. In 2012, he re-signed for Saffron Walden as a player-coach. He was appointed joint manager of the club alongside Colin Wallington in 2013, and became sole manager of the club in 2014. In September 2018 he left the club.

On 6 February 2019, Wardley was announced as the new manager of Haverhill Rovers. However, he resigned from the role in May.

== Honours ==
Rushden & Diamonds

- Football League Third Division: 2002–03
