= Samuel Koejoe =

Dutch footballer (born 1974)

Personal information
- Date of birth: 17 August 1974 (age 52)
- Place of birth: Paramaribo, Suriname
- Height: 1.84 m (6 ft 0 in)
- Position: Striker

Youth career
- 1988–1996: DWS

Senior career*
Years	Team	Apps	(Gls)
1996–1998	Austria Lustenau	43	(19)
1998–1999	Austria Salzburg	45	(14)
1999–2001	Queens Park Rangers	34	(3)
2001–2002	Austria Lustenau	10	(4)
2002–2005	Wacker Tirol	77	(70)
2005–2006	SC Freiburg	36	(7)
2006–2007	Eintracht Braunschweig	8	(0)
2007	Dynamo Dresden	16	(8)
2007–2008	FSV Frankfurt	6	(0)
2008–2009	Wacker Innsbruck	21	(5)
2009–2010	DAC Dunajská Streda	30	(7)
2010–2011	Reutte	14	(10)
Total		343	(147)
- * Club domestic league appearances and goals

Samuel Koejoe (born 17 August 1974 in Paramaribo, Suriname) is a Dutch former professional footballer who played as a striker.

A pacy striker, Koejoe played much of his career in Austria and Germany, and played for Queens Park Rangers.

He was the leading scorer for DAC Dunajská Streda in the 2009–10 season.
