= Ross Weare =

English footballer

Personal information
- Full name: Ross Michael Weare
- Date of birth: 19 March 1977 (age 49)
- Place of birth: London, England
- Position: Forward

Team information
- Current team: Boreham Wood (first-team coach &academy coach)

Senior career*
| Years | Team | Apps | (Gls) |
| –1999 | East Ham United | | |
| 1999–2001 | Queens Park Rangers | 4 | (0) |
| 2001–2002 | Bristol Rovers | 10 | (1) |
- East Thurrock United
| Total | | 14 | (1) |

Managerial career
- 2022–2023: Clapton
- 2023–: Boreham Wood (academy coach)
- * Club domestic league appearances and goals

Ross Weare (born 19 March 1977) is a former professional footballer, who played as a forward for Queens Park Rangers and Bristol Rovers in The Football League between 1998 and 2002. He is currently first-team coach and head academy coach at Boreham Wood.

== Career ==
Weare was born in Perivale, in London, and played for East Ham United.

He joined Queens Park Rangers in March 1999 and made four League appearances for the club. In July 2001, he was signed to Bristol Rovers by his old QPR manager Gerry Francis. At Bristol Rovers he scored his first professional goal in a win at Scunthorpe United. He had suffered from back injuries while with QPR, and his ongoing problems in this area lead to his premature retirement from football at the age of 25.

He later played for Isthmian League club East Thurrock United.

== Managerial career ==
On 26 April 2022, Weare was appointed manager of Essex Senior League club Clapton.

In June 2025, Weare was promoted to the role of first-team coach with Boreham Wood, continuing with his role of academy manager.
