= Alex Higgins (footballer, born 1981) =

English footballer

Personal information
- Date of birth: 22 July 1981 (age 45)
- Place of birth: Sheffield, England
- Position: Midfielder

Youth career
- Sheffield Wednesday

Senior career*
Years	Team	Apps	(Gls)
2001	Queens Park Rangers	1	
2001–2002	Chester City		
2001	Stalybridge Celtic		
2002–2003	Boston United		
2004–2006	Northwich Victoria		
- * Club domestic league appearances and goals

Alex Higgins (born 22 July 1981) is a former professional and semi-professional football player who last played for Northwich Victoria. He also played for Queens Park Rangers, Chester City, Stalybridge Celtic and Boston United.

He played for Boston United between 2002 and 2003, scoring his first professional goal in the process in an FA Cup defeat to Northampton Town. However he had issues with epilepsy at this time and even collapsed during a game as a result.
