= Richard Langley =

Footballer (born 1979)

Personal information
- Full name: Richard Barrington Michael Langley
- Date of birth: 27 December 1979 (age 46)
- Place of birth: Harlesden, England
- Height: 6 ft 0 in (1.83 m)
- Position: Midfielder

Senior career*
Years	Team	Apps	(Gls)
1996–2003	Queens Park Rangers	133	(18)
2003–2005	Cardiff City	69	(8)
2005–2006	Queens Park Rangers	33	(3)
2006–2008	Luton Town	29	(1)
2008–2009	Bristol Rovers	0	(0)
2010–2012	Pattaya United	13	(0)
2012	Hemel Hempstead Town	3	(0)
2012	Staines Town	7	(1)
Total		287	(31)

International career
2002–2008	Jamaica	17	(2)
- * Club domestic league appearances and goals

Richard Barrington Michael Langley (born 27 December 1979) is a former professional footballer who played as a midfielder. He started his career with Queens Park Rangers making over 160 league appearances for the club in two spells separated by two seasons with Cardiff City. He went on to play for Luton Town, Bristol Rovers, Thai Premier League side Pattaya United. Having started the 2012–13 season with Hemel Hempstead Town he signed for Conference South side Staines Town, coached by Marcus Gayle, during the season. Born in England, he was capped by Jamaica at international level.

== Club career ==
Born in Harlesden, London, Langley rose through the youth system at Queens Park Rangers, signing a professional contract in 1996. One of the highlights of his career at QPR was scoring a hat-trick in an away win over Blackpool in March 2003.

After a trial with Crystal Palace, he signed for Cardiff City in 2003 for an initial fee of £200,000 rising to around £250,000 on appearances. He returned to QPR in August 2005, but was not given a contract extension. He joined Luton on a free transfer a year later, and wore the number 17 shirt for the 2006–07 season. He scored his first and what turned out to be only Luton goal in a 2–2 draw with Stoke City on 19 August 2006.

Langley damaged his cruciate knee ligaments in a pre-season friendly in 2007 and missed almost the entire 2007–08 season, making a solitary appearance in the final game of the season. He left Luton at the end of June 2008 when his contract expired, and joined Bristol Rovers on a short-term contract on 21 November 2008

On 1 July 2009, he started training with Blackpool and played in pre-season games, with Seasiders manager Ian Holloway stating that Langley could be offered a contract if he impressed during a training spell with the club.

On 28 February 2011, he was due at Pittodrie for talks with Aberdeen manager Craig Brown over a deal.

On 14 July 2012, Langley came on as a substitute for Northwood in their 0–0 draw with Chelsea's Under 21 side and played 45 minutes. Three days later, Langley again featured for Northwood this time from the start however, in their 3–2 friendly win over Enfield Town.

Having trained with Northwood over the first few weeks of pre-season, Langley was signed by Southern Football League side Hemel Hempstead in August 2012.

Langley made three appearances for the Tudors in September 2012 including two league games and an FA Cup qualification game against Waltham Forest. However, after making just three league appearances, Langley departed the club a short time later and linked up with Conference South side Staines Town in November 2012, making seven league appearances before departing the club.

== International career ==
Born in London, England, Langley qualifies for Jamaica through his father. In 2001 he made his international debut for Jamaica.
