= Matthew Rose (footballer) =

English footballer and coach (born 1975)

Personal information
- Full name: Matthew David Rose
- Date of birth: 24 September 1975 (age 51)
- Place of birth: Dartford, England
- Position: Defender

Youth career
- 1992–1994: Arsenal

Senior career*
| Years | Team | Apps | (Gls) |
| 1994–1997 | Arsenal | 5 | (0) |
| 1997–2007 | Queens Park Rangers | 274 | (8) |
| 2007–2008 | Yeovil Town | 39 | (1) |
| Total | | 286 | (9) |

International career
| 1996–1997 | England U21 | 2 | (0) |
- * Club domestic league appearances and goals

Matthew David Rose (born 24 September 1975) is an English football coach and former professional player who played as a defender. He began his career with Arsenal, made over 250 Football League appearances for Queen's Park Rangers, and ended his career with Yeovil Town. He represented England at under-21 level.

== Early life and career ==
Matthew David Rose was born in Dartford, Kent, on 24 September 1975, and attended Bexley Grammar School. He joined Arsenal as a trainee in 1992, and under the management of Pat Rice, captained the team to victory in the 1993–94 FA Youth Cup. He was rewarded with a first professional contract, and was a regular in Arsenal's Football Combination side in the 1994–95 season.

Rose made his senior debut on 2 March 1996 when he replaced the injured Steve Morrow at half-time of the 1–1 Premier League draw away to Queen's Park Rangers. He started the next match, in an experimental three-man back line alongside Andy Linighan and Martin Keown in a 3–1 win at home to Manchester City, and made two more appearances that season. He was capped twice for England at under-21 level during the 1996–97 season, in 1998 European Championship qualifiers away to Georgia in November 1996 and at home to Italy in February 1997. However, he appeared only once for his club, and left at the end of that season to join Queens Park Rangers, by then playing in the First Division, for a £500,000 fee.

== Queens Park Rangers ==
Rose became an influential player for QPR, and made more than 250 appearances for them in all competitions. He arrived as a right back, but went on to play as central defender, sweeper, in midfield and at left back. In 2004, his manager, Ian Holloway, described him as his "out-and-out utility player". However, he was prone to injury: of his ten seasons with the club, he only once played in more than 30 league matches, in 2001–02, their first season after relegation to the third tier, and injury deprived him of a possible appearance in the 2003 play-off final, in which QPR lost after extra time to Cardiff City. He made 28 league appearances the following season, and did play in the final fixture, in which QPR won away to Sheffield Wednesday to secure runners-up spot and consequent promotion to the newly renamed Football League Championship.

He scored eight goals. One of the more important was in September 2004 to seal a last-minute 3–2 win at Brighton & Hove Albion with a "fantastic left-footed strike" into the top corner. After the arrival of John Gregory as manager, Rose fell out of favour, and in January 2007, he was one of eleven players to leave the club as part of Gregory's "ruthless refurbishment" of the playing staff.

== Yeovil Town ==
Rose signed a short-term contract with League One club Yeovil Town on 23 February 2007. He stayed at Yeovil until the end of the following season, scoring once from 42 appearances in all competitions, but rejected an offer of another contract extension and retired from the game.

== Later career ==
After retiring as a player, Rose initially became a financial adviser, but then realised he wanted to return to football as a coach. He spent time as head of Arsenal's elite academy in Greece, working alongside former Greek international player Lakis Papaioannou.

On 20 November 2019, Rose joined Barnsley as first-team coach after the appointment of Gerhard Struber as manager. He left the role for personal reasons in July 2020. After leaving Barnsley, Rose co-founded AF Global Football, where he serves as Chief Operating Officer. The organisation focuses on developing young footballers through professional-level coaching, education, and exposure programmes in the UK and Spain. Drawing on his experience as a player and coach, Rose oversees football operations and contributes to the design of elite player development pathways aimed at supporting athletes both on and off the pitch.

== Honours ==
Arsenal

- FA Youth Cup: 1993–94

Queens Park Rangers

- Football League Second Division runner-up: 2003–04
