= Chris Plummer =

English footballer (born 1976)

Personal information
- Full name: Christopher Scott Plummer
- Date of birth: 12 October 1976 (age 50)
- Place of birth: Isleworth, England
- Height: 6 ft 2 in (1.88 m)
- Position: Defender

Youth career
- ?–1994: Queens Park Rangers

Senior career*
Years	Team	Apps	(Gls)
1994–2003	Queens Park Rangers	62	(2)
2002	→ Bristol Rovers (loan)	2	(0)
2003–2004	Barnet	37	(3)
2004–2007	Peterborough United	50	(1)
2006	→ Grays Athletic (loan)	3	(0)
2006	→ Rushden & Diamonds (loan)	2	(0)
2007–2012	Peterborough Northern Star		

International career
	England U21	5	(0)

Managerial career
- 2009–2012: Peterborough Northern Star
- 2012–2013: Corby Town
- 2014–2015: Peterborough Sports
- * Club domestic league appearances and goals

Christopher Scott Plummer (born 12 October 1976) is an English football manager and former professional player.

== Playing career ==
Plummer played for Queens Park Rangers (QPR), Bristol Rovers, Barnet, Peterborough United, Grays Athletic and Rushden & Diamonds.

Plummer made his QPR début in May 1996 versus Nottingham Forest and played 62 league games and scored two goals before leaving Loftus Road for Barnet in 2003.

In December 2006, he retired aged 30 to work in financial services subsequently working for Tortoise Property in Hampton, Peterborough. He played semi-professional football for Peterborough Northern Star in the United Counties League, until May 2009, when he was announced as the new manager of Northern Star, following Tommy Cooper's move from the dug-out to the board room as he became the club's new Director of Football. He left the club in May 2012.

== Coaching career ==
On 12 September 2012, he was named manager of Corby Town. However, following two poor displays at the start of the 2013–14 season Plummer tendered his resignation at Corby Town.

In January 2023, Plummer followed manager Jimmy Dean to Scunthorpe United as his assistant manager having held the same role at Peterborough Sports, whom Plummer had previously managed.
