= Kevin Gallen =

English footballer

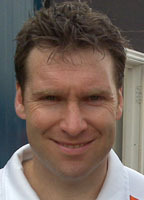
- Gallen in 2010

Personal information
- Full name: Kevin Andrew Gallen
- Date of birth: 21 September 1975 (age 51)
- Place of birth: Hammersmith, England
- Height: 5 ft 11 in (1.80 m)
- Position: Striker

Youth career
- 1992–1994: Queens Park Rangers

Senior career*
Years	Team	Apps	(Gls)
1994–2000	Queens Park Rangers	171	(36)
2000–2001	Huddersfield Town	38	(10)
2001	Barnsley	9	(2)
2001–2007	Queens Park Rangers	194	(54)
2007	→ Plymouth Argyle (loan)	13	(1)
2007–2009	Milton Keynes Dons	30	(9)
2008–2009	→ Luton Town (loan)	9	(1)
2009–2011	Luton Town	57	(18)
2010–2011	→ Barnet (loan)	7	(1)
2011	Braintree Town	3	(1)
2011–2012	Leverstock Green	5	(1)
2012–2013	Aylesbury United	4	(2)
Total		540	(136)

International career
1993	England U18	11	(0)
1995–1996	England U21	4	(0)
- * Club domestic league appearances and goals

Kevin Andrew Gallen (born 21 September 1975) is an English former professional footballer who played as a striker.

He notably played in the Premier League for Queens Park Rangers over several seasons, and would have two spells with the Loftus Road club. He also played in the Football League for Huddersfield Town, Barnsley, Plymouth Argyle, Milton Keynes Dons, Luton Town and Barnet, before finishing his career in Non-league with Braintree Town, Leverstock Green and Aylesbury United. A former England Under-21 striker, Gallen signed a professional contract for QPR on his 17th birthday after setting phenomenal scoring records whilst in the youth team, breaking Jimmy Greaves' long-standing record at that level.

== Career ==
=== Queens Park Rangers ===
Gallen was born in Chiswick. He made his Queens Park Rangers league debut in the Premier League at Old Trafford on the opening day of the 1994–95 season, and later went on to form a partnership with Les Ferdinand, scoring more than ten goals. Gallen's form dipped the next season after Ferdinand departed for Newcastle United, as QPR were relegated to The First Division.

After two games of the 1996–97 season, in which he scored three goals, Gallen sustained a serious knee injury whilst playing against Portsmouth, which resulted in him missing the rest of the season.

His return to the team saw mixed performances, but by the 1998–99 season he was back to his best form, before injuries again held him back and the arrival of Rob Steiner and Chris Kiwomya kept him out of the team.

The 1999–2000 campaign saw Gallen fall behind Kiwomya, Steiner, Steve Slade and Mikkel Beck in the pecking order. He did, however, manage to score a winning goal on the last day of the season at the ground where his injury troubles had started – Portsmouth.

=== Huddersfield and Barnsley ===
In August 2000 he left QPR to find first-team football at Huddersfield Town. His return to Loftus Road as an opposition player saw him score, but then miss a penalty. Gallen soon found himself out in the cold once more as Huddersfield changed managers, and his contract was not renewed at the end of the season.

Gallen spent the summer of 2001 training with QPR, now in Division Two, with a view to joining on a free transfer, but a compromise on wages could not be reached. He instead joined Barnsley on a two-year contract.

=== Return to QPR ===
The deal at Barnsley proved to be a short-lived, as Gallen re-joined Queens Park Rangers on 19 November 2001. Two days after returning to his boyhood club he scored one and set up two others in an emphatic 4–0 home win over Swindon.

A change in fortunes soon followed for Gallen and QPR, with Gallen earning the club captaincy, netting another 55 goals over the ensuing five seasons and helping the club to establish itself back in the second tier of English football. Overall, Gallen scored 97 goals for QPR, making him the sixth highest scorer in the club's history.

=== Plymouth and MK Dons ===
On 11 January 2007 Gallen linked up with his former QPR manager Ian Holloway, joining Plymouth Argyle on loan until the end of 2006–07 season. During his spell at Home Park he scored once in the league, during a 3–2 victory over Coventry City. He was released by QPR in July 2007. He was offered a contract by Plymouth Argyle, but instead opted to join a lower-level club – Milton Keynes Dons. Gallen played 31 games and scored nine goals as MK Dons won both promotion to League One as champions, and The Football League Trophy.

=== Later career ===
On 14 November 2008, Gallen joined League Two side Luton Town on an initial one-month loan, which was later extended by a further month. His run in the team at Luton coincided with a seven match unbeaten run for The Hatters, with Gallen often being used as a midfielder. At the beginning of January, Gallen had his contract at MK Dons terminated by mutual consent, and he subsequently signed for Luton as a free agent. Gallen signed a one-year extension to his Luton contract at the end of the season, a campaign that ultimately ended in Luton's relegation to the Conference, keeping him at the club until June 2010.

Now in non-league football, Gallen found himself utilised back in his familiar position as a striker, scoring eighteen goals in the 2009–10 season, including his first ever hat-trick on 5 April 2010 in a 6–0 win over Grays Athletic. His goalscoring prowess saw him sign a further one-year extension to his contract, running until the end of the 2010–11 season.

In October 2010 Gallen joined Barnet on a three-month loan deal. He scored one goal in nine appearances during his time at the club, before returning to Luton on 8 January 2011.

On 31 January 2011, Gallen was released from his Luton contract. He made a total of 74 appearances for Luton, scoring 21 goals.

On 31 March 2011, Gallen signed for Braintree Town. After a short spell with Leverstock Green in 2011–12, Gallen signed for Aylesbury United of the Molten Spartan South Midlands League Premier Division at the start of the 2012–13 season.

== Personal life ==
Gallen was born in England to Irish parents from Donegal and Mayo. He has two brothers in football, Joe and Steve, who have both also worked as coaches for QPR.

In January 2015, Gallen was a finalist alongside Rufus Brevett for the Harrow Borough job, although the job was handed to Steve Baker instead.

Gallen has appeared on The Magic Sponge podcast by Dave which is hosted by comedians Rob Beckett, Ian Smith and ex-footballer Jimmy Bullard. He has appeared twice as a guest, one time being a late replacement for Chris Iwelumo. Gallen became a cult hero on the podcast and occasionally steps in for Jimmy Bullard as a co-host when Jimmy is absent.

== Honours ==
Queens Park Rangers

- Football League Second Division second-place promotion: 2003–04

Milton Keynes Dons

- Football League Two: 2007–08
- Football League Trophy: 2007–08

England U18

- UEFA Under-18 Championship: 1993
