= Paul Bruce =

English footballer

Personal information
- Full name: Paul Mark Bruce
- Date of birth: 18 February 1978 (age 48)
- Place of birth: Lambeth, England
- Position: Defender

Youth career
- –1996: Queens Park Rangers

Senior career*
Years	Team	Apps	(Gls)
1996–2002	Queens Park Rangers	37	(3)
1999	→ Cambridge United (loan)	4	(0)
2002–2007	Dagenham & Redbridge	121	(10)
2007–2008	St Albans City		
- * Club domestic league appearances and goals

Paul Mark Bruce (born 18 February 1978) is an English former professional footballer who played in the Football League as a defender.
