= Gavin Peacock =

English footballer (born 1967)

Personal information
- Full name: Gavin Keith Peacock
- Date of birth: 18 November 1967 (age 58)
- Place of birth: Eltham, England
- Positions: Midfielder; striker

Senior career*
Years	Team	Apps	(Gls)
1984–1987	Queens Park Rangers	17	(1)
1987	→ Gillingham (loan)	6	(0)
1987–1989	Gillingham	64	(11)
1989–1990	AFC Bournemouth	56	(8)
1990–1993	Newcastle United	105	(35)
1993–1996	Chelsea	103	(17)
1996	→ Queens Park Rangers (loan)	5	(2)
1996–2002	Queens Park Rangers	185	(34)
2001	→ Charlton Athletic (loan)	5	(0)
Total		546	(107)

International career
1985	England U17	2	(0)
1985	England Youth	1	(0)
- * Club domestic league appearances and goals

Gavin Keith Peacock (born 18 November 1967) is an English former professional footballer and sports television pundit.

As a player he was midfielder and striker from 1984 until 2002, notably playing in the Premier League for Chelsea. He also played in the Football League for Newcastle United, Queens Park Rangers, Gillingham, AFC Bournemouth and Charlton Athletic.

He then worked in the media as a pundit, notably for BBC Sport, before relocating to Canada to study theology and become a Christian minister.

== Early life ==
Born in Eltham, Peacock lived in Crayford in the London Borough of Bexley, and attended Bexley Grammar School in nearby Welling as a child. He played schoolboy international football for England.

Peacock comes from a footballing family; his father Keith played for Charlton. Though Peacock followed Charlton Athletic as a child, he maintained a soft spot for Newcastle United. His father's side of the family are from North East England, and his father's cousin was at Newcastle in the 1950s, though he did not make a first team debut. In his youth Peacock owned Newcastle replica shirts and also regularly visited South Shields on family holidays. He has said that his family lineage and connection to the North East was a big draw in him signing for Newcastle when the opportunity came up.

== Playing career ==
Peacock started his career at Queens Park Rangers, making 17 appearances in the First Division and scoring once before he moved to Third Division Gillingham in October 1987 in a move which was started by his father, Keith, Gillingham's manager. Peacock joined on loan initially, but signed permanently for £40,000 in December 1987. Shortly after joining, his father was sacked by the club but Gavin remained on as a player until after their relegation to the Fourth Division in 1989. He was named as the Kent side's Young Player of the Year award in his first season and then in the relegation season of 1988–89 his displays saw him recognised by the supporters who voted him as Player of the Year.

He was signed by Harry Redknapp for AFC Bournemouth in a £250,000 deal on 16 August 1989, but was unable to prevent their relegation to the Third Division that season. He began the 1990–91 season still at Bournemouth, but on 30 November 1990 he made the move back to the Second Division when Jim Smith paid Bournemouth £275,000 to take Peacock to Newcastle United.

The "Magpies" were in the Second Division at the time and were founder members of the new Division One on the creation of the new FA Premier League in 1992, and in the 1992–93 season he helped them win the Division One title. He was Newcastle United's top scorer in 1991–92 with 16 goals and one of their best scorers in the promotion season with 12 goals.

He was sold to Chelsea for £1.5million soon afterwards, being one of new player-manager Glenn Hoddle's first signings for the Stamford Bridge side.

Peacock famously scored both home and away for Chelsea in 1–0 victories over Manchester United in the 1993–94 season. Both sides met again in the FA Cup Final, and with the score at 0–0 just before half time, Peacock hit the crossbar from 25 yards and missed a golden opportunity to gain silverware. Manchester United went on to win the final 4–0 and achieve the double. Peacock finished joint top scorer that season with 14 goals from midfield. He helped them reach the semi-finals of the UEFA Cup Winners' Cup in 1995 and the FA Cup semi finals in 1996.

Peacock returned to Queens Park Rangers in 1996, having lost his place in the Chelsea team to new signing Roberto Di Matteo.

He made a brief return to the Premier League in 2001 after going on loan to Charlton Athletic in 2001, where his father was now assistant manager. Peacock returned to QPR for the 2001–02 season, at the end of which he retired, having made 196 appearances in total for the club. By this stage, however, they were in Division Two. In total he scored more than 100 goals in over 540 league appearances.

== Media career ==
After retiring, Peacock worked with the BBC, regularly appearing as a pundit on Football Focus, Score, Match of the Day, Match of the Day 2, BBC Radio 5 Live's comedy game show Fighting Talk and the BBC Radio 4 comedy show One. He also hosted a weekly podcast on the official Chelsea website.

== Ministry ==
Peacock became a Christian when he was 18. He presented a feature on Football Focus about faith in the game in December 2006. He also presented Songs of Praise on 10 February 2008, at the same time as his coverage of the Africa Cup of Nations final. After his wife suffered a serious illness in 2006, he decided to end his career as a pundit and moved to Canada for a three-year master's course in divinity at Ambrose Seminary. He became a pastor in 2012. After serving as associate pastor at Calvary Grace Church in Calgary, he returned to England in early 2025 on a one-year appointment as pastor of Bethersden Baptist church.

== Personal life ==
Peacock and his wife Amanda have a son and a daughter. They had a house in Bexley, Kent, before Peacock started his theological studies, and a small holiday home in Canada in the Rocky Mountains.

== Honours ==
Newcastle United

- Football League First Division: 1992–93

Chelsea

- FA Cup runner-up: 1993–94

Individual

- Gillingham Young Player of the Year: 1987–88
- Gillingham Player of the Year: 1988–89
- Newcastle United Player of the Year: 1991–92
- PFA Team of the Year: 1992–93 First Division

== Publications ==
In 2016, with Owen Strachan, he published The Grand Design, a book presenting a complementarian view of gender roles. He published his autobiography, A Greater Glory: From Pitch to Pulpit, in 2021.
