= Lee Harper =

Footballer and manager (born 1971)

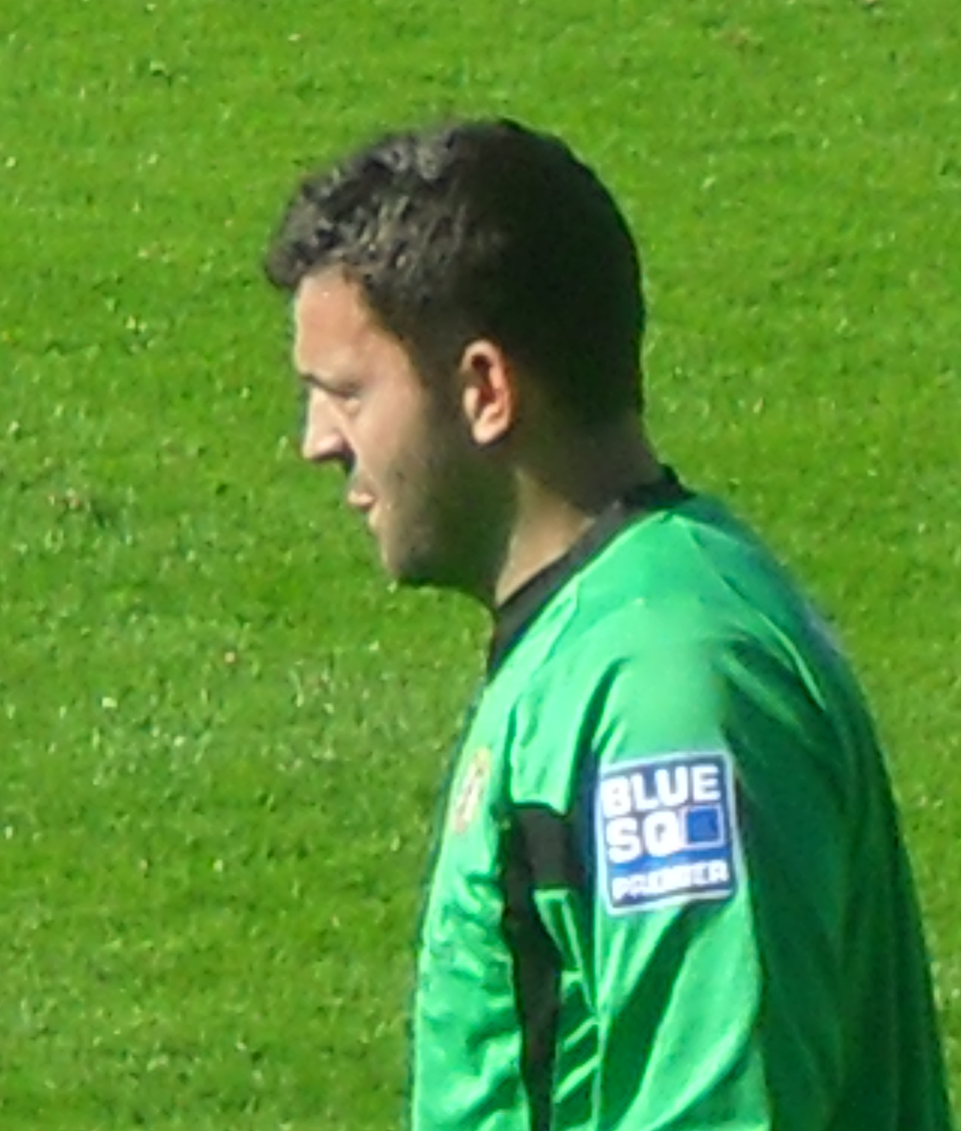
- Harper playing for Kettering Town in 2009

Personal information
- Full name: Lee Charles Philip Harper
- Date of birth: 30 October 1971 (age 55)
- Place of birth: Chelsea, London, England
- Height: 6 ft 1 in (1.85 m)
- Position: Goalkeeper

Senior career*
Years	Team	Apps	(Gls)
- Eltham Town
–1994	Sittingbourne		
1994–1997	Arsenal	1	(0)
1997–2001	Queens Park Rangers	119	(0)
2001–2002	Walsall	3	(0)
2002–2007	Northampton Town	156	(0)
2006–2007	→ Milton Keynes Dons (loan)	11	(0)
2007	Milton Keynes Dons	11	(0)
2007–2010	Kettering Town	112	(0)
Total		417	(0)

Managerial career
- 2009–2010: Kettering Town
- * Club domestic league appearances and goals

Lee Charles Philip Harper (born 30 October 1971) is an English former footballer, and manager who played as a goalkeeper.

After beginning his career with Eltham Town he went on to play in the Football League for Queens Park Rangers, Walsall, Northampton Town and Milton Keynes Dons. He finished his career as a player-manager at Conference National side Kettering Town.

== Playing career ==
Born in Chelsea, London, Harper started his career at non-League club Eltham Town, signing for Sittingbourne after featuring against them, before being signed by Arsenal in June 1994. He cost Arsenal £150,000 – one of the biggest fees paid for a non-league player at the time.

He was third-choice goalkeeper at the club, behind Vince Bartram and David Seaman, and only made one first team appearance for the Highbury side, in a 2–0 FA Premier League win over Southampton on 15 March 1997. In the summer of 1997 he moved to Queens Park Rangers (QPR), and in four seasons made 119 league appearances. He moved to Walsall in 2001 after QPR were relegated to the Second Division, but made only three appearances in his single season there. He moved to Northampton Town in 2002 and became first-choice goalkeeper there, recording over 150 league appearances.

He moved to League Two team Milton Keynes Dons on loan in October 2006, where he helped to repair the team's poor defending record, with a significant reduction in goals conceded. This successful loan spell resulted in Harper signing a permanent deal in January 2007. He was released at the end of the 2006–07 season in May. He signed for Conference North team Kettering Town in August 2007. He made 40 appearances in all competitions in the 2007–08 season as Kettering won the Conference North title. He made 54 appearances in all competitions in the 2008–09 season and he signed a new contract with the club in July 2009.

== Managerial career ==
He was appointed as player-manager of Kettering Town on 16 November 2009 on a contract until the end of the 2009–10 season following the departure of Mark Cooper. On 8 December 2009 Harper was given the Man of the Match award by ITV commentator Andy Townsend for his performance in Kettering Town's 5–1 defeat to Leeds United at Elland Road in the second round of the FA Cup. His assistant John Deehan was sacked after the final whistle and Harper said in the press conference after the game he was considering his own future due to Deehan's sacking. Due to a long-term back problem he was ruled out of action until he had treatment, which resulted in him signing goalkeeper Nathan Abbey in January 2010. He said he was unsure over his future at the club in April 2010 before being appointed full-time manager on 17 May, with Tommy Jaszczun returning to the club as his assistant manager. He left the club by mutual consent on 20 September 2010 after Kettering had won one game in nine up to that point in the 2010–11 season.

== Managerial statistics ==
As of 20 September 2010.

Team	Nation	From	To	Matches	Won	Drawn	Lost	Win %
Kettering Town	England	16 November 2009	20 September 2010	37	8	12	17	21.6

== Honours ==
Individual

- PFA Fans' Player of the Year: 2003–04 Third Division
