= Jermaine Darlington =

English footballer

Personal information
- Full name: Jermaine Christopher Darlington
- Date of birth: 11 April 1974 (age 52)
- Place of birth: Hackney, London, England
- Height: 5 ft 7 in (1.70 m)
- Positions: Defender; midfielder

Senior career*
Years	Team	Apps	(Gls)
1992–1993	Charlton Athletic	2	(0)
1993–1994	Dover Athletic		
1996–1997	Hendon		
1998–1999	Aylesbury United	35	(2)
1999–2001	Queens Park Rangers	71	(2)
2001–2004	Wimbledon	105	(3)
2004–2005	Watford	26	(0)
2005–2006	Cardiff City	9	(0)
2006–2007	AFC Wimbledon	26	(1)
2009–2011	Maidstone United		
2011–2015	Whitstable Town		

Managerial career
- 2015–2017: Sittingbourne (U21 joint manager)
- 2017–2019: Herne Bay (joint manager)
- 2022: Faversham Town (joint manager)
- * Club domestic league appearances and goals

Jermaine Christopher Darlington (born 11 April 1974) is an English football coach and former professional player. He was most recently joint manager of Faversham Town.

== Career ==
=== Playing career ===
Darlington began his career as a trainee at Charlton Athletic, where he played two first-team games near the end of the 1991–92 season. He was released a year later and dropped out of the professional game, continuing his career on a semi-professional basis, playing with Dover Athletic, Hendon and Aylesbury United.

He got a second chance in the Football League in 1999, when he was signed by Queens Park Rangers from non-League club Aylesbury United, for £25,000.

Darlington went on to make over 80 professional appearances for the R's before then First Division side Wimbledon bought him for £200,000 in 2001. He made over 100 appearances for The Dons, before being released at the end of the 2003–04 season.

Brief stints at Watford and Cardiff City followed in 2004–05, and 2005–06 however with a knee injury restricting his first-team chances Darlington left Cardiff in the summer of 2006, effectively retiring from professional football.

Following a trial with AFC Wimbledon, Darlington agreed terms with the Dons in time for the game against Tonbridge Angels on 18 November 2006, making him the first ex-Wimbledon player to play competitively for AFC Wimbledon. (Note: While Darlington was the first ex-Wimbledon FC player to play competitively for AFC Wimbledon he was actually the second ex-Wimbledon player to join the club. The first was Roger Joseph who was at the club briefly at the start of the 2005–06 season but left after playing a just handful of pre-season friendly fixtures.)

This move would prove costly for the Dons however as, due to an administrative error by the club in signing him, Darlington was initially ineligible to play for the club. (Note: When Darlington signed for AFC Wimbledon his previous club was Cardiff City. Cardiff play in the English League structure, which is administered by The FA of England. However, as with other Welsh clubs competing in the English leagues, the players of Cardiff City are actually registered to the FA of Wales. As a result of this, when Darlington signed for AFC Wimbledon, his registration was not held by the FA but by the FAW and as such he was regarded as an 'international' signing and the club was therefore required to seek 'international clearance' for his registration to be transferred from one FA to the other. AFC Wimbledon were not aware of this and as a result Darlington was considered to be ineligible for competitive fixtures.) The penalties the club received for this mistake were severe. The Dons were expelled from two cup competitions, the Surrey Senior Cup and the FA Trophy, for which the club was ordered to repay £12,000 in prize money, and also received a hefty penalty in the Isthmian League with 18 league points being docked, in addition to a £400 fine and costs. This 18-point penalty was later reduced to just three points, after an appeal to The FA. Darlington was released at the end of the 2006–07 season by new Dons boss Terry Brown.

After his release from AFC Wimbledon Darlington did not find another semi pro club, instead opting to play local football in London. However, in October 2009 and at the age of 35 he made the move back to the semi pro game, signing for Isthmian League Premier Division side Maidstone United.

Darlington subsequently joined Isthmian League Division One South side Whitstable Town in March 2011, providing much needed cover and experience. Manager Peter Nott was quoted on the capture of Darlington: "As you can see Jermaine brings a wealth of experience with him and I am confident he will settle in very quickly". He made his Natives debut on 15 March 2011 in a home loss to Whyteleafe. He retired from playing after leaving Whitstable.

=== Coaching and management ===
After retiring from football, Darlington became joint manager of Sittingbourne U21s alongside John Embery in 2015. In May 2017 the pair were appointed joint managers of Herne Bay. He resigned on 31 March 2019.

In June 2022, Darlington was appointed joint manager of Faversham Town, again with John Embery. Following a poor start to the season, the duo left the club on 17 October 2022.
