= Keith Rowland =

Northern Irish footballer (born 1971)

Personal information
- Date of birth: 1 September 1971 (age 55)
- Place of birth: Portadown, Northern Ireland
- Position: Defender

Senior career*
Years	Team	Apps	(Gls)
1989–1993	AFC Bournemouth	72	(2)
1990	→ Farnborough Town (loan)	1	(0)
1993	→ Coventry City (loan)	2	(0)
1993–1998	West Ham United	80	(1)
1998–2001	Queens Park Rangers	56	(3)
2001	→ Luton Town (loan)	12	(2)
2001–2002	Chesterfield	12	(0)
2003	Barnet	8	(0)
2003	Hornchurch	0	(0)
2004	Dublin City	?	(1)
2005–2006	Redbridge	36	(0)
2006–2007	Welling United	0	(0)
Total		279	(9)

International career
1993–1999	Northern Ireland	19	(1)

Managerial career
- 2016–2018: Wingate & Finchley
- 2019–2021: Aveley
- 2021–2022: Tilbury
- 2023–2026: Brentwood Town
- * Club domestic league appearances and goals

Keith Rowland (born 1 September 1971) is a Northern Irish football manager and former footballer.

As a player, he was a defender who notably played in the Premier League for Coventry City and West Ham United. He also played in the Football League for AFC Bournemouth, Queens Park Rangers, Luton Town, Chesterfield and Barnet, as well as with non-league sides Hornchurch, Redbridge and Welling United. He also represented Northern Ireland, winning 19 caps.

Since retirement, Rowland has worked as a manager and coach within non-league football. He has managed Wingate & Finchley and Aveley, having previously been on the coaching staff at Braintree Town.

== Club career ==
Rowland was signed by AFC Bournemouth manager Harry Redknapp, making his league debut appearance against Darlington on 17 August 1991. He had two loan spells away from The Cherries at Farnborough Town and at Coventry City where he made two substitute appearances.

In the summer of 1993, with Redknapp now assistant manager to Billy Bonds at West Ham, Rowland, was signed for £110,000 alongside midfielder Paul Mitchell. Rowland played 91 games in all competitions for West Ham, scoring only one goal, in a 1–1 away draw against Newcastle United in November 1996. He found his first team opportunities limited in his time at West Ham due to injury and the form of first team regulars Julian Dicks and David Burrows.

In January 1998 Rowland moved to Queens Park Rangers (QPR) along with Iain Dowie as part of the deal which saw Trevor Sinclair move to Upton Park. Rowland made his QPR debut in January 1998 against Stockport County and went on to make 56 league appearances, scoring three goals.

He stayed at the QPR until August 2001, which included a period on loan, at Luton Town, before moving to Chesterfield on a free transfer.

He made only 12 appearances for Chesterfield before signing for Barnet in March 2003. The summer of 2003 saw Rowland's final Football League appearance before he made his move into non-League football.

== International career ==
Rowland gained 19 caps for Northern Ireland scoring one goal in a 1–0 win against Finland on 10 October 1998. He was first capped whilst with West Ham making his international debut on 8 September 1993 against Latvia. His final game came on 9 May 1999 in a 1–0 win against Ireland.

== Coaching career ==
After coaching at Aveley, Rowland followed manager Rod Stringer to Braintree Town in May 2010 where he was first-team coach. After managerial contract negotiations failed, he left the club with Stringer in May 2011. On 14 June 2011, Rowland returned to Braintree as Assistant Manager to Alan Devonshire. In January 2016, Rowland was appointed manager of Wingate & Finchley. During Rowland's time at the club, Wingate recorded two record high finishes in the Isthmian League Premier Division. On 29 August 2019, Rowland returned to Aveley as manager. He left Aveley in November 2021. He was appointed Tilbury manager on 16 November 2021. Rowland left by mutual agreement on 19 February 2022.

In October 2023, he returned to management when he was appointed manager of Brentwood Town. Having led the club to promotion in his second season, he departed the club in September 2026.

== Career statistics ==
Scores and results list Northern Ireland's goal tally first.

#	Date	Venue	Opponent	Score	Result	Competition	Scored
1	10 October 1998	Windsor Park, Belfast	Finland	1–0	1–0	UEFA Euro 2000 qualifying	1
