= Steve Morrow =

Irish footballer and manager (born 1970)

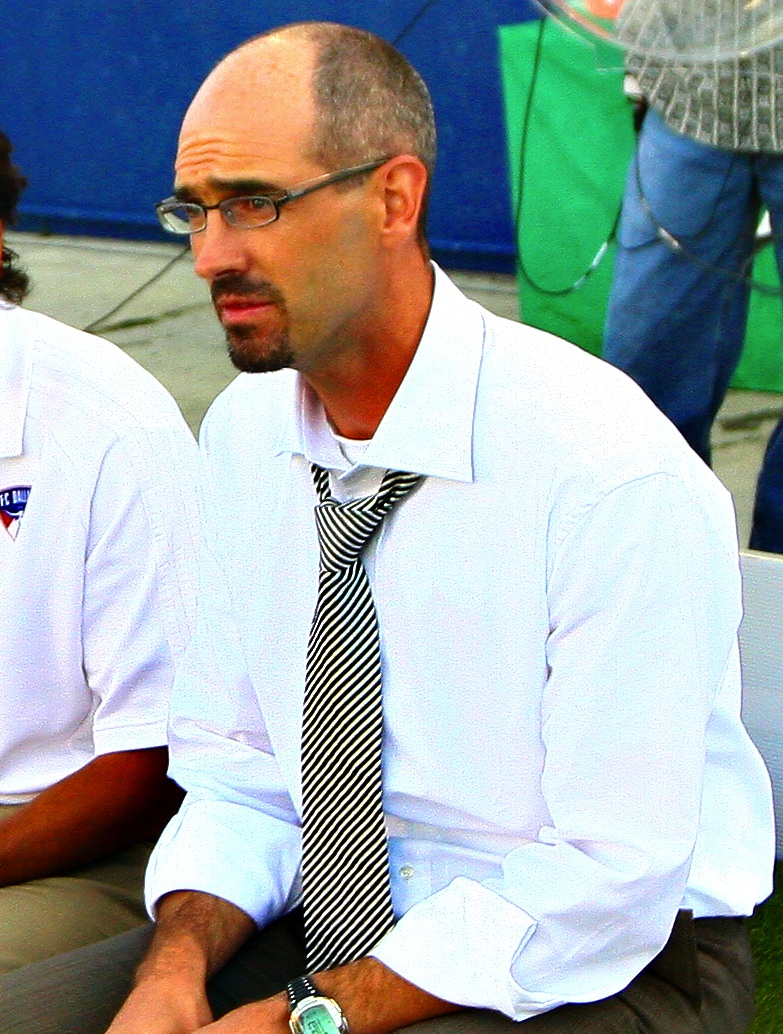

Personal information
- Full name: Stephen Joseph Morrow
- Date of birth: 2 July 1970 (age 56)
- Place of birth: Belfast, Northern Ireland
- Height: 1.83 m (6 ft 0 in)
- Positions: Defender; midfielder

Youth career
- –1987: Bangor
- 1987–1988: Arsenal

Senior career*
Years	Team	Apps	(Gls)
1988–1997	Arsenal	62	(1)
1991	→ Reading (loan)	10	(0)
1991	→ Watford (loan)	8	(0)
1991	→ Reading (loan)	3	(0)
1992	→ Barnet (loan)	1	(0)
1997	→ Queens Park Rangers (loan)	1	(1)
1997–2001	Queens Park Rangers	91	(1)
2001	→ Peterborough United (loan)	11	(0)
2002–2003	Dallas Burn	41	(3)
Total		228	(6)

International career
1990–1999	Northern Ireland	39	(1)

Managerial career
- 2006–2008: FC Dallas
- * Club domestic league appearances and goals

Stephen Joseph Morrow (born 2 July 1970) is a Northern Irish former professional footballer and manager. He was The Football Association's head of player selection and talent strategy until 2023.

As a player he played most of his career at left back but he has played in three Cup-finals as a midfield marker, from 1988 until 2003, playing in the Premier League for Arsenal and in Major League Soccer for Dallas Burn. He also played in the Football League for Reading, Watford, Barnet, Queens Park Rangers and Peterborough United. He received 39 caps for Northern Ireland, scoring once. He moved into management with FC Dallas and went on to work in a number of key technical roles back at Arsenal across a 12-year period.

== Club career ==
=== Arsenal ===
Morrow first played for Bangor as youth, before joining Arsenal in July 1987. A versatile utility man, who could play at full back, centre back or midfielder, Morrow had loan spells at Reading, Watford and Barnet, before making his debut for Arsenal as a substitute in a First Division match on 8 April 1992 against Norwich City, in place of the injured Nigel Winterburn.

By the start of 1992–93 he had played more times for his country than for Arsenal, but another injury to Winterburn brought him back to Highbury for a spell in November, and he finally established himself in the side. He played some of his matches in midfield in a marker role, as Arsenal reached the League Cup and FA Cup finals. Morrow started the League Cup final against Sheffield Wednesday; after falling behind to a John Harkes goal, Arsenal equalised through Paul Merson, and then Merson set up Morrow to score the winner (which was also his first for the club). In the celebrations after the match, Arsenal skipper Tony Adams attempted to pick up Morrow and parade him on his shoulders, but Adams slipped and Morrow awkwardly hit the ground. He broke his arm and had to be rushed to hospital.

As a result, Morrow missed the rest of that season, including the FA Cup final (also against Sheffield Wednesday), where Arsenal completed the Cup Double. Before the final kicked off, Morrow received his League Cup winners' medal.

The next season Morrow was in and out of the team and played only 13 matches, compared to 25 the previous season. One of those was the scene of an Arsenal triumph, the club's Cup Winners' Cup final win over Parma. In an Arsenal midfield depleted of John Jensen and David Hillier, Morrow was called up at the last minute and made his first appearance in the competition that season, partnering 20-year-old Ian Selley, and veteran Paul Davis in central midfield, as Arsenal beat Parma 1–0 with an Alan Smith goal. Morrow stuck to his task of stemming Gianfranco Zola. His was a discreet presence but his contribution was nonetheless significant.

Morrow had nearly left the club in March 1994, following an approach from the Premier League's bottom club Swindon Town, but the transfer fell through and he signed a new contract with Arsenal, where he spent three more years.

He went on to play over 20 matches the following season, including a second Cup Winners' Cup final (which Arsenal lost to Real Zaragoza). Morrow scored his second Arsenal goal in the League Cup once again against Sheffield Wednesday, and scored his first Arsenal league goal in a 3–1 defeat at Blackburn Rovers, who won the Premier League that season. However, he never found favour under new Arsenal boss Bruce Rioch, who only gave the Irishman five matches in 1995–96.

=== Queens Park Rangers ===
After the arrival of Arsène Wenger in 1996, Morrow was told he was surplus to requirements at Highbury, and he was loaned to Queens Park Rangers in March 1997; the deal was made permanent that summer. He played 85 games for Arsenal in total, scoring three goals.

At QPR, Morrow was initially a regular, but the club struggled, going from contenders for promotion to the Premiership to facing relegation to the Second Division. Injuries to his shoulder ligaments ruled Morrow out for most of the 1999–2000 season, and he lost his place in the side. Morrow later had a loan spell at Peterborough United, but it did not become permanent, and he was released on a free transfer in the summer of 2001.

=== Dallas Burn ===
Struggling to find a club in the UK, Morrow moved to the United States to play for Major League Soccer side Dallas Burn. He spent two seasons at Dallas (who renamed themselves FC Dallas in 2004), before retiring because of a persistent neck injury.

== International career ==
Morrow made his full international debut for Northern Ireland, in May 1990 against Uruguay; he went on to win 39 caps for his country from then until 1999.

== Managerial and further career ==
On 3 February 2004, Morrow was named as an assistant coach to FC Dallas but resigned in late May for personal reasons. However, he returned to the club on 27 January 2005 under coach Colin Clarke. When Clarke was fired on 7 November 2006, Morrow was named interim head coach. On 11 December 2006, FC Dallas removed the 'interim' from his title. Morrow was fired as coach on 20 May 2008.

On 12 September 2008 Morrow returned to Arsenal as International Partnerships – Performance Supervisor, managing Arsenal's international partnerships, which included the Colorado Rapids of Major League Soccer in the United States, BEC Tero Sasana of Thailand and Hoàng Anh Gia Lai of Vietnam, and assisting Arsenal's academies in countries such as Egypt and Ghana. From 2014, Morrow worked as Arsenal's head of youth development – a period which saw the likes of Emile Smith Rowe, Ainsley Maitland-Niles, Reiss Nelson, Bukayo Saka, Joe Willock and Eddie Nketiah come through the ranks for club and country. He left Arsenal in 2019 following a coaching staff shake up.

On 7 May 2021, Morrow was appointed The FA's head of player selection and talent strategy working across England men's teams.

== Honours ==
Arsenal

- Football League Cup: 1992–93
