= 1967–68 Queens Park Rangers F.C. season =

English football club season

Queens Park Rangers
1967–68 season
- Chairman: Jim Gregory
- Manager: Alec Stock
- Football League Second Division: 2nd
- FA Cup: Third Round
- Football League Cup: Fourth Round
- London Challenge Cup: Quarter-Finals
- Top goalscorer: League: Rodney Marsh 14; All: Rodney Marsh 14
- Highest home attendance: 25,895 Vs Birmingham City 4 May 1968
- Lowest home attendance: 12,917 Vs Blackburn Rovers 12 December 1967
- Average home league attendance: 18,462
- Biggest win: 6–0 Vs Rotherham United (6 January 1968)
- Biggest defeat: 0–4 Vs Derby County (17 February 1968)
Home colours	Away colours

During the 1967–68 English football season, Queens Park Rangers competed in the Second Division

== Season summary ==
QPR were promoted out of the Second division for the first time with a final day victory at Aston Villa pipping Blackpool on goal average only the second team ever to reach the first division with consecutive promotion seasons.

Rodney Marsh was again top-scorer with 14 goals despite missing the start of the season with a broken foot.

Rumours were that Manchester City were interested in Mick Leach

== League standings ==
Pos	Team	Pld	W	D	L	GF	GA	GAv	Pts	Qualification or relegation
1	Ipswich Town (C, P)	42	22	15	5	79	44	1.795	59	Promotion to the First Division
2	Queens Park Rangers (P)	42	25	8	9	67	36	1.861	58	Promotion to the First Division
3	Blackpool	42	24	10	8	71	43	1.651	58	
4	Birmingham City	42	19	14	9	83	51	1.627	52	
5	Portsmouth	42	18	13	11	68	55	1.236	49	

Rules for classification: 1) Points; 2) Goal average; 3) Goals scored
(C) Champions; (P) Promoted

== Results ==
QPR scores given first

Win Draw Loss

=== Second Division ===
Date	Opponents	Venue	Result F–A	Scorers	Attendance	Position
19 August 1967	Portsmouth FC	A	1–1	Roger Morgan	23,267	13
22 August 1967	Bristol City	A	2–0	Leach 2	20,228	2
26 August 1967	Norwich City	H	2–0	Keen, Ian Morgan	14,526	3
29 August 1967	Bristol City	H	3–1	Morgan, Morgan, Allen	15,448	1
2 September 1967	Rotherham United	A	3–1	Allen, Leach, Lazarus	8,111	1
5 September 1967	Aston Villa	H	3–0	Sanderson 2, Lazarus 47'	21,438	1
9 September 1967	Derby County	H	0–1		18,431	1
16 September 1967	Preston North End	A	2–0	Roger Morgan, Leach	15,792	1
23 September 1967	Charlton Athletic	H	2–1	Allen, Ian Morgan	18,933	1
30 September 1967	Crystal Palace	A	0–1		38,006	3
7 October 1967	Bolton Wanderers	H	1–0	Wilks	16,848	3
14 October 1967	Hull City	A	0–2		14,240	4
21 October 1967	Millwall	H	3–1	Roger Morgan, Keene, Allen	23,887	3
28 October 1967	Blackpool	A	1–0	Allen	21,635	1
4 November 1967	Blackburn Rovers	H	PP			
11 November 1967	Carlisle United	A	1–3	Sibley	12,544	4
18 November 1967	Middlesbrough	H	1–1	Marsh	17,557	4
25 November 1967	Huddersfield Town	A	0–1		14,615	5
2 December 1967	Ipswich Town	H	1–0	Marsh	16,266	4
9 December 1967	Birmingham City	A	0–2		25,281	3
12 December 1967	Blackburn Rovers	H	3–1	Marsh, Wilks, Sanderson	12,917	3
16 December 1967	Portsmouth FC	H	2–0	Ian Morgan, Keen	20,195	2
23 December 1967	Norwich City	A	0–0		23,593	2
26 December 1967	Plymouth Argyle	A	1–0	Keene	21,003	2
30 December 1967	Plymouth Argyle	H	4–1	Marsh 2, Keene 2	15,889	1
6 January 1968	Rotherham United	H	6–0	Leach 2, Ian Morgan 2, Roger Morgan, Marsh	16,782	1
20 January 1968	Preston North End	H	2–0	Marsh 2	16,663	1
3 February 1968	Charlton Athletic	A	3–3	Roger Morgan, Marsh	21,507	1
10 February 1968	Crystal Palace	H	2–1	Ian Morgan, Wilks	18,954	1
17 February 1968	Derby County	A	0–4		22,854	1
24 February 1968	Bolton Wanderers	A	1–1	Roger Morgan	14,956	1
9 March 1968	Hull City	H	1–1	Marsh	17,705	1
16 March 1968	Millwall	A	1–1	Marsh	21,346	1
23 March 1968	Blackpool	H	2–0	Ian Morgan, Clarke	18,498	1
30 March 1968	Blackburn Rovers	A	1–0	Clarke	16,141	1
6 April 1968	Carlisle United	H	1–0	Clarke	18,103	1
12 April 1968	Cardiff City	H	1–0	Ian Morgan	20,021	1
13 April 1968	Middlesbrough	A	1–3	Allen	20,849	1
16 April 1968	Cardiff City	A	0–1		20,021	2
20 April 1968	Huddersfield Town	H	3–0	Marsh 2, Legg OG	19,646	2
27 April 1968	Ipswich Town	A	2–2	Marsh, Leach	28,152	2
4 May 1968	Birmingham City	H	2–0	Ian Morgan, Marsh	25,895	2
11 May 1968	Aston Villa	A	2–1	Leach 70', Bradley OG 82'	33,835	2

=== London Challenge Cup ===
Date	Round	Opponents	H / A	Result F–A	Scorers	Attendance
2 October 1967	First Round	Barnet	A	5–2		
16 October 1967	Quarter-Finals	Tottenham	H	1–4		

=== Football League Cup ===
Date	Round	Opponents	H / A	Result F–A	Scorers	Attendance
12 September 1967	Second Round	Hull City (Second Division)	H	2–1	Leach, Keen	16,609
10 October 1967	Third Round	Oxford United (Third Division)	H	5–1	Wilks 5	16,989
31 October 1967	Fourth Round	Burnley (First Division)	H	1–2	Sibley	24,213

=== FA Cup ===
Date	Round	Opponents	H / A	Result F–A	Scorers	Attendance
27 January 1968	Third Round	Preston North End (Second Division)	H	1–3	Keen	18,425

=== Friendlies ===
Date	Location	Opponents	H / A	Result F–A	Scorers	Attendance
5 August 1967		Italian Olympic XI	H			
8 August 1967		Southend United	A			
12 August 1967		Oldham Athletic	A			
15 August 1967		Brentford	H			
4 March 1968		Internacional Bratislava Slovnaft	H			
6 May 1968	Shellito Testimonial	Chelsea	A			
13 May 1968	Mike Keen Testimonial	Chelsea	H			
14 May 1968	Mike Keen Testimonial	Wycombe Wanderers	A			
15 May 1968		Bath City	A			
23 May 1968	Spain	Athletico Bilbao	A			
26 May 1968	Spain	Real Santander	A			

== Squad ==
Position	Nationality	Name	League Appearances (substitutes)	League Goals	Cup Appearances	F.A.Cup Goals	League Cup Goals	Total Appearances	Total Goals
GK	(England)	Ron Springett	36		4			40	
GK	(England)	Mick Kelly	6					6	
DF	(England)	Dave Clement	30		4			34	
DF	(England)	Tony Hazell	42		3			45	
DF	(England)	Bobby Finch	3					3	
DF	(England)	Ron Hunt	10(1)		2			13	
DF	(England)	Frank Sibley	5	1	1		1	6	2
DF	(England)	Allan Harris	42		4			46	
DF	(England)	Bobby Keetch	32(1)		3			36	
DF	(England)	Ian Watson	6(4)					10	
MF	(England)	Alan Wilks	12(3)	3	1		5	16	8
MF	(England)	Mark Lazarus	14(1)	2	2			17	2
MF	(England)	Mick Leach	21(2)	9	3		1	26	10
MF	(England)	Mike Keen	42	6	4	1	1	46	8
MF	(England)	Roger Morgan	40	8	4			44	8
MF	(England)	Keith Sanderson	16(2)	3	1			19	3
FW	(England)	Frank Clarke	13	3				13	3
FW	(England)	Mick McGovern	1					1	
FW	(England)	Les Allen	24(2)	6	3			29	6
FW	(England)	Rodney Marsh	25	14	1			26	14
FW	(England)	Ian Morgan	42	10	4			46	10

== Transfers In ==
Name	from	Date	Fee
Allan Harris	Chelsea	July 1967	£30,000
Kevin Wallis *		July ?1967	
Mick McGovern	Queens Park Rangers Juniors	November 1967	
Bob Turpie	Queens Park Rangers Juniors	November 1967	
Frank Clarke	Shrewsbury	21 February 1968	£34,000
Allan Glover	Queens Park Rangers Juniors	1 March 1968	
Gerry Francis	Queens Park Rangers Juniors	June 1968	

== Transfers Out ==
Name	from	Date	Fee	Date	Club	Fee
Alan Davies		September 1965		July? 1967	Guildford City	
Jim Langley	Fulham	July 1965	£5,000	September 1967	Hillingdon Borough (player-manager)	
Mark Lazarus	Brentford	4 November 1965	£3,000	November 1967	Crystal Palace	£10,000
Kevin Wallis		July ?1967		May 1968		
