= 1966–67 Queens Park Rangers F.C. season =

English football club season

Queens Park Rangers
1966–67 season
- Chairman: Jim Gregory
- Manager: Alec Stock
- Stadium: Loftus Road
- Football League Third Division: 1st
- FA Cup: Third Round
- Football League Cup: Winners
- London Challenge Cup: Quarter-Finals
- Top goalscorer: League: Rodney Marsh 30; All: Rodney Marsh 44
- Highest home attendance: 26,404 Vs Birmingham City 7 February 1967
- Lowest home attendance: 5,497 Vs Colchester United 23 August 1966
- Average home league attendance: 13,161
- Biggest win: 7–1 Vs Mansfield Town (24 September 1966)
- Biggest defeat: 0–3 Vs Sheffield Wednesday (28 January 1967)
Home colours	Away colours	Third colours

During the 1966–67 English football season, Queens Park Rangers competed in the Third Division.

== Season summary ==
QPR won the third division for the first time and shocked first division West Bomwich Albion in the first Wembley final of the League Cup.

== League standings ==
Pos	Team	Pld	W	D	L	GF	GA	GAv	Pts	Promotion or relegation
1	Queens Park Rangers (C, P)	46	26	15	5	103	38	2.711	67	Promotion to the Second Division
2	Middlesbrough (P)	46	23	9	14	87	64	1.359	55	Promotion to the Second Division
3	Watford	46	20	14	12	61	46	1.326	54	
4	Reading	46	22	9	15	76	57	1.333	53	
5	Bristol Rovers	46	20	13	13	76	67	1.134	53	

(C) Champions; (P) Promoted

== Results ==
QPR scores given first

Win Draw Loss

=== Third Division ===
Date	Opponents	Venue	Result F–A	Scorers	Attendance	Position
20 August 1966	Shrewsbury Town	H	2–2	Allen, Marsh	6,343	13
27 August 1966	Watford	A	0–1		9,957	20
3 September 1966	Swindon Town	H	3–1	Lazarus (34', 83') Morgan (76')	7,900	12
6 September 1966	Middlesbrough	H	4–0	Morgan, Morgan, Allen	8,807	6
10 September 1966	Reading	A	2–2	Langley, Ian Morgan	8,148	7
17 September 1966	Doncaster Rovers	H	6–0	Roger Morgan 2, Keen 2, Sanderson, Marsh	8,090	4
24 September 1966	Mansfield Town	A	7–1	Marsh 3, Allen 2, Langley, Sanderson	6,260	2
26 September 1966	Middlesbrough	A	2–2	Marsh, Lazarus	13,091	2
1 October 1966	Grimsby Town	H	5–1	Allen 2, Marsh, Lazarus, Roger Morgan	9,097	2
8 October 1966	Swansea	H	4–2	Marsh, Allen 2, Sanderson	11,047	2
15 October 1966	AFC Bournemouth	A	3–1	Roger Morgan 2, Marsh	12,164	1
19 October 1966	Torquay	A	1–1	Langley	7,887	1
22 October 1966	Orient	H	4–1	Marsh, Allen 2, Lazarus	16,719	1
29 October 1966	Gillingham	A	2–2	Keen, Marsh	11,951	2
5 November 1966	Workington	H	4–1	Marsh 2, Allen, Langley	9,094	2
12 November 1966	Scunthorpe United	A	2–0	Marsh 2	5,052	2
15 November 1966	Torquay	H	2–1	Roger Morgan, Allen	10,385	1
19 November 1966	Oldham Athletic	H	0–1		14,413	1
7 December 1966	Bristol Rovers	H	3–0	Allen, Sanderson, Lazarus	13,312	1
10 December 1966	Colchester United	A	3–1	Marsh, Roger Morgan 2	8,195	1
17 December 1966	Shrewsbury	A	0–0		6,520	1
26 December 1966	Brighton And Hove Albion	H	3–0	Marsh, Sanderson, Lazarus	17,875	1
27 December 1966	Brighton And Hove Albion	A	2–2	Wilks, Roger Morgan	22,947	1
31 December 1966	Watford	H	4–1	Marsh 2, Sibley, Lazarus	17,073	1
14 January 1967	Reading	H	2–1	Marsh, Roger Morgan	14,341	1
21 January 1967	Doncaster Rovers	A	1–1	Keen	12,062	1
4 February 1967	Mansfield Town	H	0–0		14,728	1
11 February 1967	Grimsby Town	A	1–1	Ian Morgan	7,157	1
20 February 1967	Peterborough United	A	2–0	Lazarus, Crawford OG	6,411	1
25 February 1967	Swansea City	A	3–1	Lazarus 3	10,141	1
7 March 1967	AFC Bournemouth	H	4–0	Keen, Marsh 2, Allen	21,558	1
11 March 1967	Peterborough United	H	0–0		16,716	1
18 March 1967	Orient	A	0–0		14,607	1
24 March 1967	Darlington	H	4–0	Marsh, Allen, Langley, Lazarus	18,601	1
25 March 1967	Gillingham	H	2–0	Marsh, Ian Morgan	14,612	1
27 March 1967	Darlington	A	0–0		9,914	1
1 April 1967	Workington	A	2–0	Langley, Ian Morgan	4,010	1
8 April 1967	Scunthorpe United	H	5–1	Marsh 2, Keen, Lazarus 2	13,113	1
11 April 1967	Walsall	A	0–2		11,181	1
15 April 1967	Oldham Athletic	A	1–0	Wilks	14,729	1
22 April 1967	Oxford United	H	3–1	Wilks 2, Lazarus	15,365	1
25 April 1967	Walsall	H	0–0		11,860	1
29 April 1967	Bristol Rovers	A	1–2	Leach	17,721	1
2 May 1967	Swindon Town	A	1–1	Wilks 90'	21,367	1
6 May 1967	Colchester	H	2–1	Sanderson, Allen	10,935	1
13 May 1967	Oxford United	A	1–2	Marsh	10,189	1

=== London Challenge Cup ===
Date	Round	Opponents	H / A	Result F–A	Scorers	Attendance
28 September 1966	First Round	Wembley	H	5–0		
18 October 1966	Quarter-Finals	Barnet	H	1–3		

=== Football League Cup ===
Date	Round	Opponents	H / A	Result F–A	Scorers	Attendance
23 August 1966	First Round	Colchester United (Third Division)	H	5–0	Marsh 4, Lazarus	5,497
14 September 1966	Second Round First Leg	Aldershot Town (Fourth Division)	A	2–1	Leach, Keen	5,349
20 September 1966	Second Round second leg	Aldershot Town (Fourth Division)	H	2–0	Langley, Marsh	7,848
12 October 1966	Third Round	Swansea Town (Third Division)	H	2–1	Hazell, Keen	12,988
25 October 1966	Fourth Round	Leicester City (First Division)	H	4–2	Roger Morgan, Allen 2, Lazarus	20,735
7 December 1966	Fifth Round	Carlisle United (Second Division)	H	2–1	Marsh 2	19,146
17 January 1967	Semi final First leg	Birmingham City (Second Division)	A	4–1	Roger Morgan, Allen, Marsh, Lazarus	34,295
7 February 1967	Semi final Second leg	Birmingham City (Second Division)	H	3–1	Marsh 2, Keen	26,404
4 March 1967	Final	West Bromwich Albion (First Division)	Wembley	3–2	Roger Morgan, Marsh, Lazarus	97,952

=== FA Cup ===
Date	Round	Opponents	H / A	Result F–A	Scorers	Attendance
26 November 1966	First Round	Poole Town (Southern Football League Premier Division)	H	3–2	Marsh 3	9,534
7 January 1967	Second Round	Bournemouth & Boscombe Athletic (Third Division)	H	2–0	Langley, Lazarus	12,102
28 January 1967	Third Round	Sheffield Wednesday (First Division)	A	0–3		40,038

=== Friendlies ===
Date	Location	Opponents	H / A	Result F–A	Scorers	Attendance
6 August 1966		Aldershot	A			
9 August 1966		Norwich City	H			
11 August 1966		Wimbledon	A			
13 August 1966		Norwich City	A			
15 August 1966		Maidenhead	A			
17 August 1966		Dover	A			
27 October 1966		Southall	A			
3 May 1967	Tony Ingham Testimonial	International XI	H			
9 May 1967		Bletchley	A	PP		
11 May 1967	Terry Foley Testimonial	Yeovil Town	A			
15 May 1967		Bletchley	A			
9 June 1967	Spain	Real Jaén	A			
10 June 1967	Spain	Malaga	A			

== Squad ==
Position	Nationality	Name	League Appearances (substitute)	League Goals	Cup Appearances	F.A.Cup Goals	League Cup Goals	Total Appearances	Total Goals
GK	(England)	Peter Springett	46		11			57	
GK	(England)	Mick Kelly			1			1	
DF	(England)	Dave Clement	1					1	
DF	(England)	Tony Hazell	37		7		1	44	1
DF	(England)	Ron Hunt	44		12			56	
DF	(England)	Frank Sibley	42	1	11			53	1
DF	(England)	Bobby Keetch	1(1)					2	
DF	(England)	Ian Watson	15		6			21	
DF	(England)	Colin Moughton	3					3	
DF	(England)	Jim Langley	40(1)	6	11	1	1	52	8
MF	(England)	Alan Wilks	7(1)	5				8	5
MF	(England)	Mark Lazarus	44	14	12	1	4	56	19
MF	(England)	Mick Leach	2				1	2	1
MF	(England)	Mike Keen	46	5	12		3	58	8
MF	(England)	Roger Morgan	44	11	12		3	56	15
MF	(England)	John Collins	1					1	
MF	(England)	Keith Sanderson	40	6	12			52	6
FW	(England)	Les Allen	42	15	12		3	54	18
FW	(England)	Rodney Marsh	41	30	12	3	11	53	44
FW	(England)	Ian Morgan	10(6)	4	1			17	4

== Transfers In ==
Name	from	Date	Fee
Bobby Finch	Queens Park Rangers Juniors	August 1966	
Lew Adams		3 October 1966	
Bobby Keetch	Fulham	November 1966	
Ron Springett	Sheffield Wednesday	22 May 1967	£16,000
Alan Spratley	Queens Park Rangers Juniors	May 1967	

== Transfers Out ==
Name	from	Date	Fee	Date	Club	Fee
Billy McAdams	Brentford	22 Sep 1964	£5,000	July 1966	Barrow	£5,000
Brian Taylor		March 1962		July 1966	Romford	
Colin Moughton	Queens Park Rangers Juniors	December 1965		July 1966	Sunderland (coach)	
Billy McAdams	Brentford	September 1964		July 1966	Barrow	
Ray Brady	Millwall	July 1963		July 1966	Hastings United	
John Collins	Queens Park Rangers Juniors	21 August 1959		October 1966	Oldham Athletic	£10,000
Brian Inkpen *		July ?1965		November 1966		Free
John Brooks		August 1965		December 1966	Ipswich	£5,000
Peter Springett	Queens Park Rangers Juniors	May 1963		May 1967	Sheffield Wednesday	£40,000
Colin Parker		March 1965		June? 1967	Guildford City	
Lew Adams		3 October 1966		June? 1967	Bedford Town	
