= 1968–69 Queens Park Rangers F.C. season =

English football club season

Queens Park Rangers
1968–69 season
- Chairman: Jim Gregory
- Manager: Bill Dodgin Jr. (1 August 1968 – 1 November 1968); Tommy Docherty (1 November 1968 – 30 November 1968); Les Allen (from 1 December 1968)
- Football League First Division: 22nd
- FA Cup: Third Round
- Football League Cup: Second Round
- London Challenge Cup: Semi-Finals
- Top goalscorer: League: Barry Bridges / Mick Leach 9 All: Barry Bridges / Mick Leach 9
- Highest home attendance: 31,138 vs Manchester United, 26 October 1968
- Lowest home attendance: 12,489 vs Stoke City, 12 April 1969
- Average home league attendance: 21,572
- Biggest win: 3–2 Vs Sheffield Wednesday (12 October 1968)
- Biggest defeat: 1–8 Vs Manchester United 19 March 1969)
Home colours	Away colours

During the 1968–69 English football season, Queens Park Rangers competed in the First Division

== Season summary ==
In an historic first QPR played in the first division but with no away wins all season, injuries to key players and management changes they finished with a (at that time) record low points score and were relegated

== League table ==
Pos	Team	Pld	W	D	L	GF	GA	GAv	Pts	Qualification or relegation
18	Nottingham Forest	42	10	13	19	45	57	0.789	33	
19	Stoke City	42	9	15	18	40	63	0.635	33	
20	Coventry City	42	10	11	21	46	64	0.719	31	
21	Leicester City (R)	42	9	12	21	39	68	0.574	30	Relegation to the Second Division
22	Queens Park Rangers (R)	42	4	10	28	39	95	0.411	18	Relegation to the Second Division

Source: World Football
Rules for classification: 1) Points; 2) Goal average; 3) Goals scored
(R) Relegated

== Results ==
QPR scores given first

Win Draw Loss

=== First Division ===
Date	Opponents	Venue	Result F–A	Scorers	Attendance	Position
10 August 1968	Leicester City	H	1–1	Allen	21.494	11
14 August 1968	Leeds United	A	1–4	Wilks	31.612	18
17 August 1968	Wolverhampton Wanderers	A	1–3	Ian Morgan	30.858	20
20 August 1968	Sunderland	H	2–2	Allen, Clarke	20.669	20
24 August 1968	Manchester City	H	1–1	Bridges	19.716	21
27 August 1968	Ipswich Town	A	0–3		24.049	21
31 August 1968	Arsenal	A	1–2	Wilks	44.407	22
7 September 1968	Liverpool	A	0–2		46.025	22
14 September 1968	Chelsea	H	0–4		26.358	22
21 September 1968	Stoke City	A	1–1	Roger Morgan	15.565	22
28 September 1968	Southampton	H	1–1	Allen	20.760	22
5 October 1968	West Bromwich Albion	A	1–3	Clarke	22.944	22
8 October 1968	Ipswich Town	H	2–1	Bridges, Roger Morgan	17.992	22
12 October 1968	Sheffield Wednesday	H	3–2	Wilks, Bridges, Leach	19.044	20
19 October 1968	Newcastle United	A	2–3	Wilks, Moncur OG	35.503	21
26 October 1968	Manchester United	H	2–3	Leach, 58' Wilks 88'	31.138	20
2 November 1968	West Ham United	A	3–4	Leach 2, Bridges	36.008	22
9 November 1968	Burnley	H	0–2		22.572	22
16 November 1968	Everton	A	0–4		43.552	22
23 November 1968	Nottingham Forest	H	2–1	Marsh, Hazell	18.857	22
30 November 1968	Tottenham Hotspur	A	pp			
7 December 1968	Coventry City	H	0–1		17.921	22
14 December 1968	Sheffield Wednesday	A	0–4		21.280	22
21 December 1968	Newcastle United	H	1–1	Bridges	16.444	22
26 December 1968	West Bromwich Albion	H	0–4		18.649	22
28 December 1968	Manchester United	A	pp			
11 January 1969	West Ham United	H	1–1	Clarke	28.645	22
18 January 1969	Burnley	A	2–2	Marsh, Leach	12.674	22
24 January 1969	Leeds United	H	0–1		26.163	22
29 January 1969	Tottenham Hotspur	A	2–3	Clement, Clarke (pen)	38,766	22
1 February 1969	Everton	H	0–1		26.476	22
8 February 1969	Nottingham Forest	A	pp			
15 February 1969	Tottenham Hotspur	H	1–1	Clarke	30.013	22
25 February 1969	Coventry City	A	0–5		26.449	22
4 March 1969	Nottingham Forest	A	0–1		21.035	22
8 March 1969	Wolverhampton Wanderers	H	0–1		17.901	22
12 March 1969	Leicester City	A	0–2		25.587	22
15 March 1969	Manchester City	A	1–3	Leach 7'	28.859	22
19 March 1969	Manchester United	A	1–8	Marsh 62'	36.638	22
22 March 1969	Arsenal	H	0–1		23.076	22
29 March 1969	Liverpool	H	1–2	Bridges 89'	16.792	22
5 April 1969	Southampton	A	1–3	Bridges	22.103	22
7 April 1969	Sunderland	A	0–0		18.928	22
12 April 1969	Stoke City	H	2–1	Leach 2	12.489	22
19 April 1969	Chelsea	A	1–2	Bridges 24'	41.263	22

=== London Challenge Cup ===
Date	Round	Opponents	H / A	Result F–A	Scorers	Attendance
30 September 1968	First Round	Fulham	A	5–2		
23 October 1968	Quarter-Finals	Crystal Palace	A	3–0		
4 November 1968	Semi-Finals	West Ham	H	1–2		

=== Football League Cup ===
Date	Round	Opponents	H / A	Result F–A	Scorers	Attendance
4 September 1968	Second Round	Peterborough United (Fourth Division)	A	2–4	Keen, Clarke	11,408

=== FA Cup ===
Date	Round	Opponents	H / A	Result F–A	Scorers	Attendance
4 January 1969	Third Round	Aston Villa (Second Division)	A	1–2	Ian Morgan 39'	39,854

=== Friendlies ===
Date	Location	Opponents	H / A	Result F–A	Scorers	Attendance
27 July 1968		Aldershot	A			
1 August 1968	Scotland	Raith Rovers	A			
3 August 1968	Scotland	Dundee	A			
1 March 1969		Arbroath	H			
24 April 1969	Tom Higginson Testimonial	Brentford	A			

== Squad ==
Position	Nationality	Name	League Appearances	League Goals	Cup Appearances	F.A.Cup Goals	League.Cup Goals	Total Appearances	Total Goals
GK	(England)	Mick Kelly	20		1			21	
GK	(England)	Alan Spratley	13		1			14	
GK	(England)	Ron Springett	9					9	
DF	(England)	Dave Clement	17(2)	1	2			21	1
DF	(England)	Tony Hazell	38(1)	1	1			40	1
DF	(England)	Ian Gillard	4(2)		2			6	
DF	(England)	Bobby Finch	2(1)		1			4	
DF	(England)	Ron Hunt	29(2)		1			32	
DF	(England)	Frank Sibley	25		2			27	
DF	(England)	Allan Harris	29					29	
DF	(England)	Bobby Keetch	16(1)		1			18	
DF	(England)	Ian Watson	42		2			44	
MF	(England)	Alan Wilks	17(3)	5	1			21	5
MF	(England)	Gerry Francis	(1)					1	
MF	(England)	Allan Glover	5(1)		1			7	
MF	(England)	Mick Leach	30	9	1			31	9
MF	(England)	Mike Keen	19		1		1	20	1
MF	(England)	Roger Morgan	25	2	1			26	2
MF	(England)	Keith Sanderson	3(1)					4	
FW	(England)	Frank Clarke	23(1)	6	1		1	25	7
FW	(England)	Mick McGovern	1					1	
FW	(England)	Les Allen	14(2)	3	1			17	3
FW	(England)	Barry Bridges	27	9	1			28	9
FW	(England)	Rodney Marsh	22	4				22	4
FW	(England)	Ian Morgan	32(1)	1	2	1		35	2
FW	(England)	Dave Metchick	(2)					2	

== Transfers In ==
Name	from	Date	Fee
Barry Bridges	Birmingham City	21 August 1968	£50,000
Dave Metchick	Peterborough United	August 1968	£5,000
Ian Gillard	Queens Park Rangers Juniors	7 October 1968	
Mick McGovern	Queens Park Rangers Juniors	November 1968	
Steve Tom		5 February 1969	
Clive Clark	West Bromwich Albion	June 1969	player plus £70,000 for Allan Glover
Terry Venables	Tottenham Hotspur	June 1969	£70,000

== Transfers Out ==
Name	from	Date	Fee	Date	Club	Fee
Colin Moughton	Queens Park Rangers Juniors	December 1965		July 1968	Colchester United	Free
Mike Keen	Marlow	June 1958		January 1969	Luton Town	£18,500
Roger Morgan	Queens Park Rangers Juniors	September 1964		February 1969	Tottenham Hotspur	£110,000
Les Allen	Tottenham Hotspur	July 1965	£21,000	February 1969	QPR (caretaker manager)	
Bobby Keetch	Fulham	November 1966	Free	May 1969	Durban City (S.Afr.)	£5,000
Allan Glover	Queens Park Rangers Juniors	1 March 1968		June 1969	West Bromwich Albion	£70,000 and Clive Clark
Ron Springett	Sheffield Wednesday	June 1967	£16,000	June 1969	Retired	
Bobby Finch	Queens Park Rangers Juniors	August 1966		June 1969	Cape Town City.	
