= 1965–66 Queens Park Rangers F.C. season =

English football club season

Queens Park Rangers
1965–66 season
- Chairman: Jim Gregory
- Manager: Alec Stock
- Stadium: Loftus Road
- Football League Third Division: 3rd
- FA Cup: Third Round
- Football League Cup: First Round
- London Challenge Cup: Winners
- South East Counties League: Winners
- Top goalscorer: League: Les Allen 30; All: Les Allen 33
- Highest home attendance: 16,610 Vs Millwall 26 March 1966
- Lowest home attendance: 3,529 Vs Walsall 1 September 1965
- Average home league attendance: 8,263
- Biggest win: 7–2 Vs York City (1 January 1966)
- Biggest defeat: 1–6 Vs Brentford (21 August 1965)
| Home colours | Away colours |

== Season summary ==
In the first full season of new chairman Jim Gregory's tenure, Queens Park Rangers made many significant signings whilst competing in the English Third Division and finished third behind Millwall and the Champions Hull City .

Double winner signing from Tottenham Les Allen scored a league-leading 33 goals whilst late season pick up from Fulham Rodney Marsh who scored after just 3 minutes into his home debut in October as eventually promoted Millwall were defeated 6–1.

Frank Sibley became QPR's first substitute when he replaced John Collins

Jim Langley was voted the Supporters Club Player of the Year.

In May QPR defeated Arsenal 4-0 in the London Challenge Cup Final .

== League standings ==
| Pos | Team | Pld | W | D | L | GF | GA | GAv | Pts | Promotion or relegation |
|---|---|---|---|---|---|---|---|---|---|---|
| 1 | Hull City (C, P) | 46 | 31 | 7 | 8 | 109 | 62 | 1.758 | 69 | Promotion to the Second Division |
| 2 | Millwall (P) | 46 | 27 | 11 | 8 | 76 | 43 | 1.767 | 65 | Promotion to the Second Division |
| 3 | Queens Park Rangers | 46 | 24 | 9 | 13 | 95 | 65 | 1.462 | 57 | |
| 4 | Scunthorpe United | 46 | 21 | 11 | 14 | 80 | 67 | 1.194 | 53 | |
| 5 | Workington | 46 | 19 | 14 | 13 | 67 | 57 | 1.175 | 52 | |

(C) Champions; (P) Promoted

== Results ==
QPR scores given first

Win Draw Loss

=== Third Division ===
| Date | Opponents | Venue | Result F–A | Scorers | Attendance | Position |
|---|---|---|---|---|---|---|
| 21 August 1965 | Brentford | A | 1–6 | Morgan R | 15,209 | 24 |
| 23 August 1965 | Brighton And Hove Albion | H | 4–1 | Keen, Collins, Allen, McAdams | 10,480 | 11 |
| 28 August 1965 | Mansfield Town | H | 1–2 | McAdams | 6,405 | 18 |
| 31-Aug-1965 | Southend United | A | pp | | | |
| 4 September 1965 | Hull City | A | 3–1 | Allen 2, Morgan R | 20,478 | 13 |
| 11 September 1965 | Reading | H | 0–2 | | 6,800 | 15 |
| 14 September 1965 | Scunthorpe United | A | 2–1 | Collins, Allen | 5,362 | 11 |
| 18 September 1965 | Exeter City | A | 0–0 | | 6,174 | 13 |
| 25 September 1965 | Peterborough United | H | 2–1 | Collins, Langley | 5,094 | 10 |
| 2 October 1965 | Millwall | A | 1–2 | Leach | 14,465 | 14 |
| 4 October 1965 | Scunthorpe United | H | 1–0 | Keen | 6,726 | 10 |
| 9 October 1965 | York City | A | 2–2 | Allen, Morgan I | 6,553 | 12 |
| 16 October 1965 | Oxford United | H | 2–3 | Allen, Sanderson | 8,448 | 13 |
| 23 October 1965 | Swansea | A | 2–4 | Collins, Allen | 8,430 | 14 |
| 30 October 1965 | Walsall | H | 2–1 | Sibley, Langley | 5,228 | 13 |
| 5 November 1965 | Workington | A | 1–1 | McAdams | 4,464 | 13 |
| 20 November 1965 | Southend | A | 3–1 | Allen 2, Lazarus | 6,690 | 13 |
| 23 November 1965 | Brighton And Hove Albion | A | 2–0 | Allen 2 | 10,689 | 10 |
| 27 November 1965 | Swindon Town | H | 3–2 | Allen (22', 39', 84') | 6,872 | 7 |
| 11 December 1965 | Grimsby Town | H | 3–0 | Collins, Morgan R, OG | 6,671 | 4 |
| 18 December 1965 | Oxford United | A | 3–1 | Allen 2, Morgan R | 8,786 | 4 |
| 28-Dec-1965 | Oldham Athletic | A | pp | | | |
| 1 January 1966 | York City | H | 7–2 | Allen 3, Lazarus, Collins 2, Morgan R | 7,811 | 4 |
| 8 January 1966 | AFC Bournemouth | A | 1–1 | Morgan R | 7,616 | 4 |
| 15 January 1966 | Swansea | H | 6–2 | Morgan R 3, Lazarus, Collins 2, | 7,042 | 3 |
| 29 January 1966 | Brentford | H | 1–0 | Morgan R | 14,506 | 3 |
| 5 February 1966 | Mansfield Town | A | 1–2 | Collins | 4,166 | 3 |
| 15 February 1966 | Watford | H | 1–1 | Langley | 8,191 | 3 |
| 19 February 1966 | Hull City | H | 3–3 | Collins 3 | 12,327 | 3 |
| 26-Feb-1966 | Reading | A | pp | | | |
| 5 March 1966 | Watford | A | 2–1 | Keen, Morgan R | 11,600 | 3 |
| 12 March 1966 | Exeter | H | 1–0 | Allen | 7,542 | 3 |
| 19 March 1966 | Peterborough | A | 1–1 | Collins | 7,487 | 3 |
| 26 March 1966 | Millwall | H | 6–1 | Marsh 2, Collins, Allen, Lazarus, Morgan R | 16,610 | 3 |
| 2 April 1966 | Workington | H | 4–1 | Marsh, Allen 2, Lazarus | 8,016 | 3 |
| 8 April 1966 | Bristol Rovers | H | 4–1 | Marsh, Collins, Allen, Lazarus | 13,372 | 3 |
| 9 April 1966 | Shrewsbury | A | 0–0 | | 4,791 | 3 |
| 12 April 1966 | Bristol Rovers | A | 0–1 | | 9,203 | 3 |
| 16 April 1966 | Southend | H | 2–1 | Lazarus 2 | 7,028 | 3 |
| 23 April 1966 | Swindon Town | A | 1–2 | Keen 67' | 13,802 | 3 |
| 25 April 1966 | Gillingham | H | 1–3 | Marsh | 7,582 | 3 |
| 30 April 1966 | Shrewsbury | H | 2–1 | Allen, Marsh | 5,713 | 3 |
| 2 May 1966 | Oldham Athletic | H | 1–1 | Allen | 6,850 | 3 |
| 7 May 1966 | Grimsby Town | A | 2–4 | Marsh, Morgan R | 5,586 | 3 |
| 13 May 1966 | Reading | A | 1–2 | Collins | 8,554 | 3 |
| 18 May 1966 | Gillingham | A | 1–3 | Collins | 7,147 | 3 |
| 21 May 1966 | AFC Bournemouth | H | 5–0 | Marsh 2, Lazarus 3 | 4,732 | 3 |
| 26 May 1966 | Oldham Athletic | A | 2–0 | Allen, Marsh | 7,969 | 3 |
| 28 May 1966 | Walsall | A | 1–0 | Allen | 8,103 | 3 |

=== London Challenge Cup ===
| Date | Round | Opponents | H / A | Result F–A | Scorers | Attendance |
|---|---|---|---|---|---|---|
| October 1965 | First Round | Chelsea | H | 1–0 | Sibley | |
| October 1965 | Second Round | Orient | A | 3–1 | Hunt, Sanderson, Collins | |
| 1 November 1965 | Semi Final | Brentford | H | 2–1 | Wilks, Leach | |
| 10 May 1966 | Final | Arsenal | A | 4–0 | Sanderson 5', Collins 15', Morgan 18', Leach 68' | 3012 |

=== Football League Cup ===
| Date | Round | Opponents | H / A | Result F–A | Scorers | Attendance |
|---|---|---|---|---|---|---|
| 1 September 1965 | First Round First Leg | Walsall (Third Division) | H | 1–1 | og | 3,529 |
| 7 September 1965 | First Round second Leg | Walsall (Third Division) | A | 2–3 | Morgan R, Collins | 12,236 |

=== FA Cup ===
| Date | Round | Opponents | H / A | Result F–A | Scorers | Attendance |
|---|---|---|---|---|---|---|
| 13 November 1965 | First Round | Colchester United (Fourth Division) | A | 3–3 | Collins, Allen, Sanderson | 6,693 |
| 17 November 1965 | First Round Replay | Colchester United (Fourth Division) | H | 4–0 | Morgan R, Allen 2, Sanderson | 6,166 |
| 4 December 1965 | Second Round | Guilford City (Southern Football League Premier Division) | H | 3–0 | OG, Sibley, Lazarus | 8,343 |
| 22 January 1966 | Third Round | Shrewsbury (Third Division) | H | 0–0 | | 15,738 |
| 26 January 1966 | Third Round Replay | Shrewsbury (Third Division) | A | 0–1 | | 14,779 |

=== Friendlies ===
| Date | Opponents | H / A | Half time score | Result F–A | Scorers | Attendance |
|---|---|---|---|---|---|---|
| 7-Aug-1965 | Arsenal | H | | | | |
| 10-Aug-1965 | Charlton Athletic | H | | | | |
| 12-Aug-1965 | Wimbledon | A | | | | |
| 14-Aug-1965 | Portsmouth | A | | | | |
| 16-Aug-1965 | Bedford | A | | | | |
| 23-Feb-1966 | Hastings United | A | | | | |
| 18-Apr-1966 | England Amateur XI | H | | | | |

== Squad ==
| Position | Nationality | Name | League Appearances | League Goals | Cup Appearances | League.Cup Goals | F.A.Cup Goals | Total Appearances | Total Goals |
|---|---|---|---|---|---|---|---|---|---|
| GK | (England) | Peter Springett | 44 | | 7 | | | 51 | |
| GK | (England) | Frank Smith | 2 | | | | | 2 | |
| DF | (Republic of Ireland) | Ray Brady | 1 | | | | | 1 | |
| DF | (England) | Tony Hazell | 17(2) | | 2 | | | 21 | |
| DF | (England) | Ron Hunt | 32 | | 7 | | | 39 | |
| DF | (England) | Frank Sibley | 27(2) | 1 | 5 | | 1 | 34 | 2 |
| DF | (England) | Ian Watson | 40 | | 7 | | | 47 | |
| DF | (England) | Colin Moughton | 3 | | | | | 3 | |
| DF | (England) | Jim Langley | 46 | 3 | 7 | | | 53 | 3 |
| DF | (England) | Brian Taylor | 5 | | | | | 5 | |
| DF | (England) | John Mortimore | 10 | | | | | 10 | |
| MF | (England) | Mark Lazarus | 28(1) | 1 | 3 | | 1 | 32 | 2 |
| MF | (England) | Mick Leach | 10 | 1 | | | | 10 | 1 |
| MF | (England) | Mike Keen | 46 | 4 | 7 | | | 53 | 4 |
| MF | (England) | Roger Morgan | 44 | 13 | 6 | 1 | 1 | 50 | 15 |
| MF | (England) | John Collins | 35 | 18 | 7 | 1 | 1 | 42 | 20 |
| MF | (England) | Keith Sanderson | 39(3) | 1 | 7 | | 2 | 49 | 3 |
| FW | (South Africa) | Stuart Leary | 1 | | | | | 1 | |
| FW | (Wales) | Brian Bedford | | | 1 | | | 1 | |
| FW | (Northern Ireland) | Billy McAdams | 6 | 3 | 4 | | | 10 | 3 |
| FW | (England) | Les Allen | 44(1) | 30 | 7 | | 3 | 52 | 33 |
| FW | (England) | Rodney Marsh | 16 | 8 | | | | 16 | 8 |
| FW | (England) | Ian Morgan | 10 | 1 | | | | 10 | 1 |

== Transfers In ==
| Name | from | Date | Fee |
|---|---|---|---|
| Brian Inkpen * | | July ?1965 | |
| Les Allen | Tottenham Hotspur | July 1965 | £21,000 |
| Ian Watson | Chelsea | July 1965 | £10,000 |
| Colin Andrews * | | July ?1965 | |
| Ken Osborn * | | July ?1965 | |
| Dave Clement | Queens Park Rangers Juniors | July 19, 1965 | |
| Jim Langley | Fulham | July 1965 | £2,000 |
| John Brooks | | August 1965 | |
| Alan Davies | | September 1965 | |
| John Mortimore | Chelsea | September 11, 1965 | £8,000 |
| Mark Lazarus | Brentford | November 4, 1965 | £6,000 |
| Colin Moughton | Queens Park Rangers Juniors | December 1965 | |
| Eddie Wicks | | December 24, 1965 | |
| Rodney Marsh | Fulham | March 16, 1966 | £15,000 |
| Mike Kelly | Wimbledon | March 16, 1966 | £4,000 |

== Transfers Out ==
| Name | from | Date | Fee | Date | Club | Fee |
|---|---|---|---|---|---|---|
| Pat Brady | Millwall | July 1963 | | July 1965 | Gravesend & Northfleet | |
| Peter Angell | Slough Town | July 6, 1953 | | July 1965 | Leyton Orient (Coach) | |
| George Jacks | Queens Park Rangers Juniors | January 1964 | | July 1965 | Millwall | |
| Andy Malcolm | Chelsea | Ocobert 17,1962 | £10,000 | July 1965 | Port Elizabeth City | |
| Derek Gibbs | Leyton Orient | August 1963 | £5,000 | July 1965 | Romford | |
| George McLeod | Brentford | January 1964 | Plus £8,000 in exchange for Mark Lazarus | July 1965 | Port Elizabeth City | |
| Brian Bedford | Bournemouth | August 1959 | £750 | August 1965 | Scunthorpe United | £3,750 |
| Terry McQuade | Millwall | July 1963 | | November 1965 | Millwall | |
| Frank Smith | Tottenham Hotspur | May 21, 1962 | Free | November 1965 | Wimbledon | £1,000 |
| John Blake | | December 1, 1964 | | February 1966 | Hastings U | |
| Stuart Leary | Charlton Athletic | December 15, 1962 | £17,000 | March 1966 | Retired | |
| Eddie Wicks | | December 24, 1965 | | March 1966 | Wimbledon | |
| John Mortimore | Chelsea | September 11, 1965 | £8,000 | March 1966 | Sunderland (Player/Coach) | |
| Bobby Nash | | February 1964 | | June 1966 | Exeter | |
| Colin Andrews* | | July ?1965 | | June 1966 | Hayes | Free |
| Ken Osborn * | | July ?1965 | | June 1966 | Gillingham | Free |
