= History of Queens Park Rangers F.C. =

History of an English football club

The history of Queens Park Rangers Football Club (often abbreviated to QPR), a professional association football club based in White City, London, dates back to 1882, when Christchurch Rangers were formed.

== Formation and early history ==
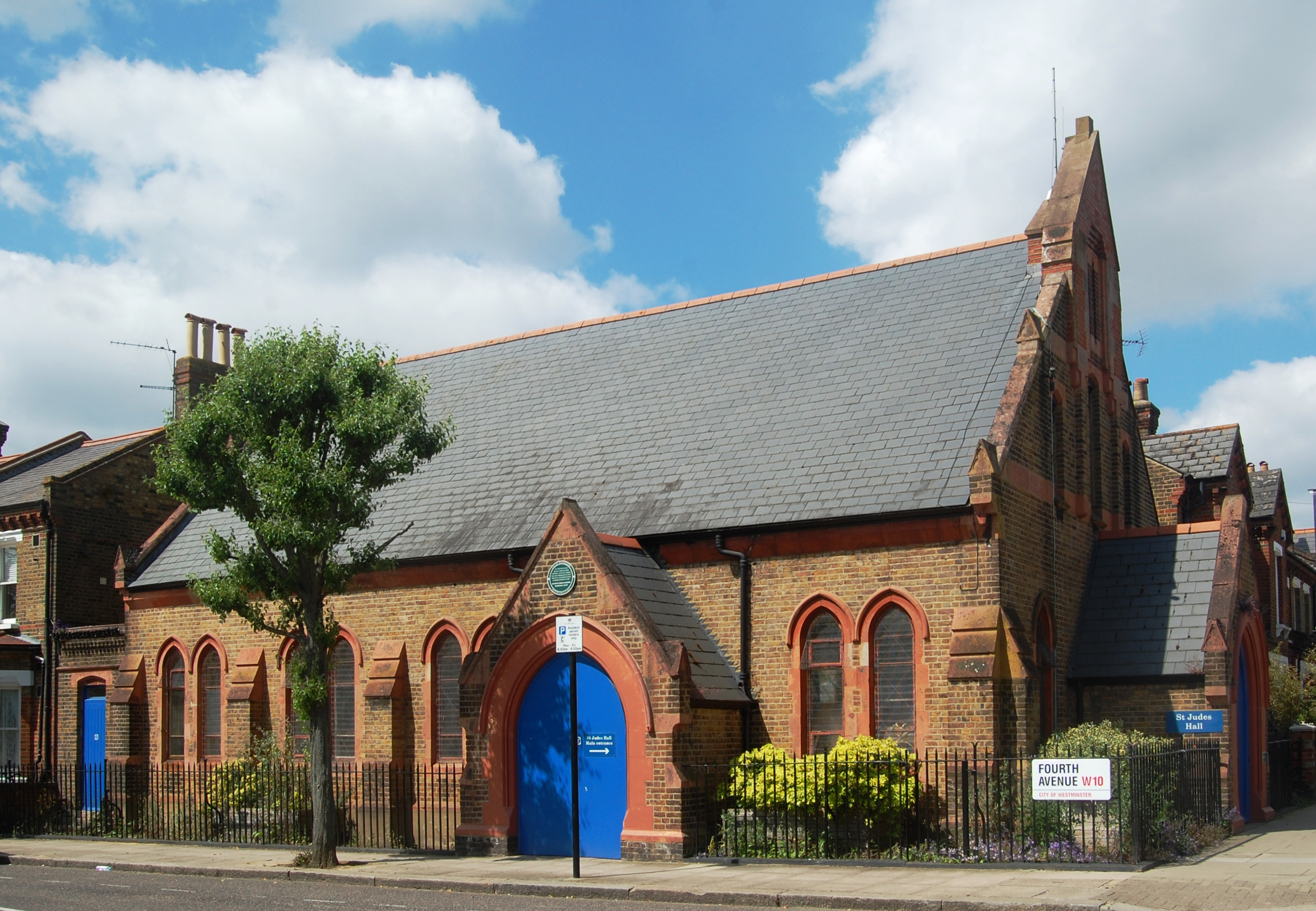
St Jude's Institute, Ilbert Street, where the club was formed.

Queens Park Rangers F.C. was formed in 1886, when a team known as St Jude's Institute (formed 1884) merged with Christchurch Rangers (formed 1882), although their official founding date is 1882, the same as when Christchurch was first formed. They were called Queens Park Rangers because most of the players came from the Queens Park area of North-West London.

QPR became a professional team in 1889. The club was elected into the Southern Football League in 1899. They first won the Southern Football League in 1907–08. As Southern League champions that year, the club played in the first ever Charity Shield match against the Football League champions, Manchester United. They lost 0–4 in a replay after the first game had finished 1-1. Both games were played at Stamford Bridge. QPR were Southern League champions for a second time in 1911–12.

The club joined the Football League in 1920, when the Third Division was formed, mainly with Southern League clubs. When the Third Division was split into North and South the following season, QPR, like most of the former Southern League clubs that had joined the Football League to form the Third Division, were in the Third Division (South).

QPR played their home games in nearly 20 different stadia (a league record), before permanently settling in Loftus Road in 1917 (although the team briefly played at White City between 1931–32 and 1962–63 in the hope of attracting larger crowds).

The club played on two grounds within Park Royal. The first was the Horse Ring, the site of the now-demolished Guinness Brewery, on the Royal Agricultural Society's show grounds from 1904 to 1907 which had a capacity of 40,000. When the Society sold the grounds in 1907, the club moved to the Park Royal Ground, 400 yards south, an almost exact replica of Ayresome Park, with a capacity of 60,000. They were forced to move out in February 1915 as the ground was taken over by the Army.

== Cup glory and promotion to the top flight ==
The club was promoted as champions of Division 3 South in the 1947–48 season. Dave Mangnall was the manager as Rangers enjoyed four seasons in the Second division, being relegated in 1951–52. Tony Ingham was signed from Leeds United and went on to make the most league appearances for QPR (519).

Prior to the start of the 1959–60 season was the arrival of arguably the club's greatest manager, Alec Stock. The 1960–61 season saw QPR achieve their biggest win to date — 9–2 vs Tranmere Rovers in a Division 3 match. In time, Stock, with the advent as chairman in the mid-60s of Jim Gregory, helped achieve a total transformation of the club and its surroundings.

In 1966–67, QPR won the Division Three championship and also became the first Third Division club to win the League Cup, when on Saturday, 4 March 1967, they defeated West Bromwich Albion 3–2, (coming back from a two-goal deficit). As of today, it is still the only major trophy that the Rangers have won. It was also the first League Cup Final to be held at Wembley Stadium. The undoubted star of the team was Rodney Marsh who scored 44 goals, but also included Les Allen, Roger Morgan and captain Mike Keen. They won the promotion again the following year, reaching the top flight for the first time in their history.

Unfortunately, their debut in the top division rapidly turned into an absolute disaster, as Stock was harshly sacked over the summer after missing the final three months of the promotion campaign due to illness. His chief coach, Bill Dodgin, Jr., took over as manager, but after a bad start to the season he stepped aside in favour of Tommy Docherty, who in turn resigned after only a month, claiming that he was unable to work with the club's board. Docherty had wished to sign Brian Tiler from his old club, Rotherham, but chairman, John Gregory, baulked at the £100,000 asking price prompting his manager to walk-out on the club. Les Allen was appointed as player-manager after Docherty's departure, but was unable to improve matters and the club was relegated straight back to the Second Division.

== Promotion again ==
After relegation in the 1968–69 season, QPR spent four years back in the Second Division. Terry Venables joined from Spurs at the beginning of the 1969–70 season and Rodney Marsh was later sold to Manchester City. But it was manager Gordon Jago who really built the new team. This included goalkeeper Phil Parkes, striker Don Givens from Luton, winger Dave Thomas from Burnley and Marsh's replacement, Stanley Bowles. These new signings in addition to home grown talent such as Dave Clement, Ian Gillard, Mick Leach, and captain Gerry Francis finished runners up to Burnley in 1972–73 season.

== Sexton's supremes ==
Jago resigned in the late 1974 and was replaced by the former Chelsea manager Dave Sexton. Sexton added John Hollins, Don Masson and David Webb to give the side the blend of experience that was needed. In 1975–76, Sexton led them to the runners-up spot in the First Division, missing out on the league title by a single point. After completing their 42-game season, QPR sat at the top of the First Division a point ahead of Liverpool who had to win their final game of the season at Wolverhampton Wanderers to snatch title away from the Rangers. Because of Liverpool appearing in the then two-legged UEFA Cup Final, the game was held over for ten days. Despite the Wolves taking the lead and holding it until the 77th minute, Liverpool scored 3 times to win 3–1 and clinch the league title. The squad contained seven England internationals. Had the current 3-points-for-a-win and goal-difference rules been in place, QPR would have stood a chance as their points would have been equal, with a goal difference of only 1.

In 1976–77, QPR failed to recreate their fine form of the previous season in the league, but the cup competitions saw some success. The side reached the semi-finals of the League Cup but lost in a replay to Aston Villa. In their first entry into European football, they reached the quarter-finals of the UEFA Cup, losing to AEK Athens on penalties. In the summer of 1977, Sexton moved to Manchester United and was replaced by his assistant, Frank Sibley, who became the youngest manager in the history of the Football League. The following season proved to be a poor one, however, and QPR only just avoided relegation, leading to Sibley's tenure being cut short after just a year. Former manager Alec Stock agreed to return to the club over the summer, only to back out just days before the following season started, due to a disagreement over the playing budget, leading to the hasty appointment of Stock's intended assistant, Steve Burtenshaw, as manager. 1978–79 proved to be a thoroughly dismal season, and the club were relegated after winning just six league games (four of the victories coming before Christmas 1978).

== Revival under Venables ==
Tommy Docherty was appointed in 1979, but after little progress, Terry Venables took over as manager in October 1980. In 1981, the club installed a 'plastic pitch'. The technology was premature and this unpopular measure was reversed in April 1988. The first game on plastic was against Luton Town who won the game 2–1 and later became the second side to install an artificial pitch. That same season QPR reached the FA Cup Final for the only time in the club's history, facing holders and London rivals Tottenham Hotspur. The first game ended 1–1 after extra time and so for the second year running the Final was to be decided by a replay. Tottenham won the replay 1–0 with the only goal coming from a Glenn Hoddle penalty in the 6th minute. There was disappointment in the league as they finished fifth in the Second Division after spending virtually all of the season in the top three until the final stages.

The following season, however, 1982–83 QPR went on to win the Second Division championship quite comfortably, thus returning to English football's top division. The side included accomplished players such as Steve Wicks, Terry Fenwick, Simon Stainrod, Clive Allen and future manager John Gregory. After a respectable fifth-place finish, and UEFA Cup qualification the following year, Venables departed to become the manager of Spanish club Barcelona.

== Mixed fortunes ==
Venables was replaced by Alan Mullery, who, early in his brief reign, presided over one of the worst defeats in QPR's history — a 0–4 loss against Partizan and elimination from the UEFA Cup despite a 6–2 1st leg advantage. Despite this loss, the club's league form was generally decent, but Mullery was inexplicably sacked and replaced by former manager Frank Sibley in December 1984. The season rapidly deteriorated after this, and a bizarre run of form (in which the club alternated between winning and losing every match for nearly three months), combined with a dismal end to the season, saw them only escape relegation due to Norwich City losing their last game.

Jim Smith replaced Sibley that summer and oversaw a period of relative stability for the club, comfortably avoiding relegation in his first two seasons and also being runners up in the 1986 League Cup, losing to Oxford United. They finished in fifth place in the 1987–88 season, but missed out on a UEFA Cup campaign due to the ban on English clubs in European competition which arose from the Heysel Stadium disaster. Despite the club being well-placed in the table the following campaign, Smith surprisingly resigned to take over at the First Division's bottom club, Newcastle United.

Following Smith's departure, Trevor Francis took over as player-manager and steered the club to another respectable finish, this time in ninth place. As the season drew to an end, however, rumours of discontent between Francis and the senior players came to a head, and the effects rapidly became evident on the pitch as the club made a horrid start to the 1989–90 season, winning just two of their first 12 games and leading to the dismissal of Francis. He was replaced by Don Howe, and the club recovered well under the new manager, finishing in eleventh place, with only a poor end to the season preventing them from doing even better. However, they failed to improve significantly the following season, dropping one place to twelfth, which resulted in Howe's contract not being renewed at the end of the season.

== The return of Gerry Francis ==
Gerry Francis, a key player in the 1970s QPR side who had proved himself as a successful manager with Bristol Rovers, was appointed manager in the summer of 1991. In the 1991–92 First Division campaign, they finished mid-table in the league and were founder members of the new Premier League which began in 1992. Francis oversaw one of QPR's most famous victories, the 4–1 win over leaders Manchester United at Old Trafford broadcast live on terrestrial television on New Year's Day 1992. The hat-trick scored by Dennis Bailey in that game remains the last time the feat was achieved in league football at Old Trafford. Many people also saw it as the beginning of the downturn in United's league form that season, as they suffered a severe shortage of goals in the second half of the campaign and were beaten by the league title by Leeds United. They finished that season in fifth place, and in the following season Francis guided them to a ninth-place finish. Midway through the 1994–95 season Francis resigned and very quickly became manager of Tottenham Hotspur, and Ray Wilkins was installed as player-manager. Wilkins led QPR to an eighth-place finish in the Premiership and they also reached the quarter-finals of the FA Cup, sparking hopes that Wilkins could maintain the success that Francis had achieved.

However, July 1995 saw the sale club's top goalscorer, Les Ferdinand, for £6 million to Newcastle United.

== Life after the premiership ==
Wilkins failed to find a successful replacement for Ferdinand and this was a major factor in QPR's relegation at the end of the 1995–96 season. Following relegation, QPR competed in Division 1 until 2001 under a succession of managers, including Stewart Houston and Ray Harford. Gerry Francis returned in 1998 and for a while stabilised the club. However, the 2000–01 season proved to be a disaster, the only bright spot being the emergence of future England international Peter Crouch in attack. Francis resigned in early 2001 to be replaced by former player Ian Holloway but it was too late as the club was relegated to England's third tier for the first time for more than thirty years.

Holloway consolidated the team and revived its fortunes finishing eighth in 2001–02, fourth in the following season (losing in the play-off final to Cardiff City) and finally second in 2003–04 which resulted in the club's promotion back to Division 1. The positive signs initially carried through into the following season as Rangers achieved a mid-table finish (11th) in the 2004–05 campaign. However, QPR struggled to build on the previous years' successes. On 6 February 2006, Holloway was suspended amidst rumours of his departure for Leicester City. He was replaced by a former player, the popular Gary Waddock. The 2005–06 season overall was difficult for Rangers both on and off the pitch due to financial troubles and boardroom issues combined with a series of poor performances and defeats. However, until the sacking of Ian Holloway, they had been secure in mid-table. It was only a winless run from the end of February to the end of the season, and the Rangers dropped to 21st position.

== Financial troubles and problems off the pitch ==
For some 10 years from the mid-1990s until late 2007, QPR was embroiled in financial and boardroom controversy. The club floated on the Alternative Investments Market in 1996 at the instigation of Chris Wright, but in 2001 following the relegation from the Premiership and a number of seasons in the second tier, the club was obliged to enter administration. A proposal to merge with Wimbledon was raised, but proved controversial and was dropped.

The club left administration burdened with a £10m loan from a Panamanian-registered financier at heavy interest, and secured by a mortgage upon the club's stadium. The club's debts were rumoured to be close to £20 million.

Scandal involving the directors, shareholders and other interested parties emerged during the 2005–06 season, following allegations of blackmail and threats of violence against the club's then chairman Gianni Paladini, who was allegedly held at gunpoint during a match at Loftus Road by hired thugs at the instigation of rival directors. He was later reported to have received threats and was, for a time, wearing a bulletproof vest. The Chairman also launched a strong attack against some critics who he claimed were seeking to destroy the club.

In an unrelated incident, youth team footballer Kiyan Prince was murdered on 18 May 2006.

== QPR avoid relegation ==
Gary Waddock brought in several new players in preparation for the 2006–07 season, including Jamaican international centre-back Damion Stewart from Bradford City and Cameroon midfielder Armel Tchakounte from Carshalton Athletic, Zesh Rehman from Fulham, Nick Ward from A-League team Perth Glory and latterly the team's top goalscorer for the season, Dexter Blackstock from Southampton for £500,000. The team was knocked out of the League Cup by Port Vale of League One and from the FA Cup by Luton Town, and struggled in the League. As a result, in September 2006, Waddock was demoted to first-team coach, and later left the club.

Another former QPR player, John Gregory, replaced him as manager. He reduced the playing staff with Ian Evatt, Scott Donnelly, Ugo Ukah, Matthew Rose, Matthew Hislop, Jonathan Munday and Egutu Oliseh, all agreeing mutual termination of their contracts, while Kevin Gallen and Sean Thomas were loaned to other clubs, and he signed Finnish defender Sampsa Timoska and Adam Bolder of Derby County, and introduced the impressive Lee Camp also of Derby on loan. The team climbed to mid-table including a 1–0 defeat of the then league leaders, Cardiff City, at Ninian Park with promising young striker Ray Jones scoring in the 88th minute. Despite initial results, the club later reverted to previous form and dropped once again to the relegation zone. In an exciting end to the season however, QPR secured safety after a run of wins, including beating Cardiff City again, this time by a solitary goal from Dexter Blackstock. The last game of the season was a 1–1 draw at home to promotion contenders Stoke City. Martin Rowlands scored Rangers' last goal of the season. Eight QPR players were booked, the most for them in 2007 and Sampsa Timoska was sent off. QPR finished 18th, a marginal improvement on the previous season and did their traditional end of season lap of honour.

On 7 February 2007, a friendly 'goodwill' match against China's youth side was curtailed after it descended into a "kung-fu" brawl, in which one Chinese player suffered a broken jaw and was knocked out. Causing a diplomatic incident, QPR's assistant manager Richard Hill was suspended by the club, and later replaced by Warren Neill.

== 2007–08 season ==
2007–08 started on a tragic note for QPR with the death of player Ray Jones in a car crash at the age of 19. Following this low point in the club's history, Rangers also faced mounting financial pressure, and in the same month it was announced that the club had been bought by wealthy Formula One businessmen Flavio Briatore and Bernie Ecclestone. During the 2007–08 season, Rangers competed in the EFL Championship. John Gregory's reign as manager came to an end in November 2007 after a string of poor results left QPR at the bottom of the Championship, and he was replaced by Luigi De Canio. QPR's form improved as De Canio guided them to a secure 14th place in the final table, and a narrow defeat at the hands of their Premier League neighbours Chelsea in the FA Cup third round. Further investment also followed in early 2008 courtesy of steel magnate Lakshmi Mittal as the club looked to push for promotion to the Premier League within 4 years, on the back of greater financial stability. On 8 May, QPR announced that Luigi De Canio had left the club "by mutual consent" and that a further announcement regarding a new manager for the following season would be made in due course.

== 2008–present ==
Ian Dowie was revealed as Luigi De Canio's replacement six days after the latter's departure on 14 May 2008. Tim Flowers was subsequently named Dowie's assistant for the upcoming 2008–09 season, reprising his former role with Dowie at Coventry City. However, on 24 October 2008, Dowie was sacked after just fifteen games in charge of the club. On 19 November 2008, QPR named former Portugal midfielder Paulo Sousa as their new first team coach. Sousa was sacked on 9 April 2009, after he allegedly divulged confidential information without authority, and player/coach Gareth Ainsworth was appointed as player/caretaker manager for a second time. Jim Magilton took over as manager in June 2009, but left the club by mutual consent on 16 December 2009 and was replaced by Paul Hart and Mick Harford on the next day. But then a month and five games after becoming manager at QPR, Hart parted with the club on 14 January 2010. The reasons for his leaving the club were unstated. Neil Warnock was appointed manager on 1 March 2010 and he guided the club back to the Premier League at the end of 2010–11 season by winning the Championship title.

However, a subsequent FA investigation involving QPR's acquisition of Alejandro Faurlín threatened to deduct points from the side and initially put their promotion into jeopardy. An investigation concluded on 7 May 2011 revealed the club to be found at fault in two of the seven charges, and received a fine of £875,000, but there were no points deducted by the FA, and QPR's promotion to the Premier League was secured. Tony Fernandes became the club's new chairman on 18 August 2011, after buying Bernie Ecclestone's 66% majority stake.

In January 2012, Fernandes appointed Mark Hughes as team manager only 36 hours after the previous incumbent Neil Warnock was sacked. Hughes led the club to safety. On 23 November 2012, Hughes was sacked after a poor start to the 2012–13 season, Harry Redknapp was confirmed as the new manager the next day. On 28 April 2013, in a 0–0 draw against fellow relegation rivals Reading, the club was relegated from the Premier League down to the Championship after two seasons in the top flight.

At the end of the 2013–14 season, QPR won the final against the favourites Derby County on 24 May 2014, 1–0 with a goal scored by Bobby Zamora in the 90th minute to return to the Premier League.

QPR had a poor start to their 2014–15 campaign in the Premier League and Harry Redknapp resigned in February after poor results and mutual frustration with the board, replaced by Chris Ramsey. The team finished the season in last place with only 30 points, and were relegated back to the Championship after just one season. After a poor start the following season, Ramsey was sacked in November 2015 and former manager Neil Warnock returned to the club. On 4 December 2015, Jimmy Floyd Hasselbaink was appointed the club's new manager. Hasselbaink was sacked on 5 November 2016 after just 11 months. Six days later, the club reappointed old favourite Ian Holloway. Holloway left the club at the end of the 2017–18 season, and just a week later, on 17 May 2018, former England manager Steve McClaren was appointed as manager.
