= 1967 Football League Cup final =

Association football match

- Match programme cover
- Event: 1966–67 Football League Cup
| Queens Park Rangers | West Bromwich Albion |
| 3 | 2 |
- Date: 4 March 1967
- Venue: Wembley Stadium, London
- Referee: Walter Crossley (Lancaster)
- Attendance: 97,952

The 1967 Football League Cup final was an association football match between Queens Park Rangers (QPR) and West Bromwich Albion on 4 March 1967 at Wembley Stadium, London. It was the final match of the 1966–67 Football League Cup, the seventh season of the Football League Cup, a football competition for the teams in The Football League. This was the first final to be decided over a single game; the six previous finals were contested over two legs. QPR were appearing in their first final, while Albion were appearing in their second after winning the previous final in 1966.

As QPR were in the Third Division they played one more round than Albion who received a bye in the first round. Therefore, QPR progressed through six rounds to reach the final, whereas Albion progressed through five. Matches up to the semi-final were contested on a one-off basis with the exception of the semi-finals which were contested over two-legs, with a match at each team's home ground. QPR's matches were generally close affairs, they only won by a three two goal margin or more in three of their matches. Albion's matches were almost all comfortable victories. Their biggest margin of victory was five goals when they beat Aston Villa 6–1. While the only match they did not win was the second leg of the semi-final against West Ham United, which was drawn 2–2.

Watched by a crowd of 97,952, Albion took the lead in the first half when Clive Clark scored in the 7th minute. He scored again later in the half to give Albion a 2–0 lead at half-time. QPR reduced the deficit in the 63rd minute when Roger Morgan scored and then levelled the match 12 minutes later courtesy of a goal by Rodney Marsh. Mark Lazarus scored a third goal for QPR in the 81st minute, as QPR won the match 3–2 to win the League Cup for the first time.

QPR's victory caused a problem for the Football Association as typically the League Cup winner would qualify for the Inter-Cities Fairs Cup, but one of the criteria for that competition was that the team must come from the highest tier of that country's league system. QPR was replaced in the following season's European competition by a First Division side.

== Road to Wembley ==
=== Queens Park Rangers ===
| Round | Opposition | Score | Venue |
|---|---|---|---|
| 1st | Colchester United | 5–0 | Loftus Road (h) |
| 2nd | Aldershot | 1–1 | Recreation Ground (a) |
| 2nd (replay) | Aldershot | 2–0 | Loftus Road (h) |
| 3rd | Swansea Town | 2–1 | Loftus Road (h) |
| 4th | Leicester City | 4–2 | Loftus Road (h) |
| 5th | Carlisle United | 2–1 | Loftus Road (h) |
| Semi-final | Birmingham City | 4–1 | St Andrew's (a) |
| Semi-final | Birmingham City | 3–1 | Loftus Road (h) |

On the first day of the 1966–67 Football League Cup on 23 August 1966, QPR played Colchester United at their home ground of Loftus Road, winning 5–0. In the third round, they defeated Welsh team Swansea City on 2–1. They were drawn against Leicester City in the following round. Three goals in the second half saw QPR come back from being 2–1 down to win the match by 4–2. The first of these goals was a rebound off Leicester goalkeeper Gordon Banks after a shot by Rodney Marsh, then a shot by Les Allen went through a Leicester goalmouth packed with defenders, and the final goal came from Mark Lazarus in similar circumstances to the Allen goal. QPR were put under pressure in their match against Carlisle United, but Marsh scored twice more for Rangers to give them the 2–1 victory.

Until the first leg of the semi-final against Birmingham City, QPR had not won an away match during their League Cup campaign. They were one goal down at half time, and again were forced to recover the deficit during the second half. In the 55th minute, Marsh scored his 34th goal of the season, he headed the ball into the goal after a corner kick from Allen. Marsh was involved again in QPR's second and third goal as he set up Roger Morgan for the second, and then back heeled the ball through to Lazarus for the third. QPR's fourth and final goal saw Marsh hit a header direct from a free kick to Allen who scored. The second leg secured QPR's first trip to Wembley, and marked the first time that a team from the Third Division had reached any Wembley final. They won the game 3–1, but they did not score until the last twelve minutes of the match.

=== West Bromwich Albion ===
| Round | Opposition | Score | Venue |
|---|---|---|---|
| 2nd | Aston Villa | 6–1 | The Hawthorns (h) |
| 3rd | Manchester City | 4–2 | The Hawthorns (h) |
| 4th | Swindon Town | 2–0 | County Ground (a) |
| 5th | Northampton Town | 3–1 | County Ground (a) |
| Semi-final | West Ham United | 4–0 | The Hawthorns (h) |
| Semi-final | West Ham United | 2–2 | Boleyn Ground (a) |

Bobby Hope led Albion to a victory at the start of their League Cup campaign, having received a bye past the first round, scoring a hat-trick as the team went on to defeat Aston Villa 6–0. Albion played Manchester City on 5 October 1966 in the third round, and although they won the game 4–2, they were pressed hard for the victory. Albion went a goal down after nine minutes against Northampton Town, but came back to win 3–1.

Their semi-final was a rematch of the 1966 Football League Cup final, with West Ham United the opposition over two legs. Albion took a commanding lead in the first leg with a 4–0 victory, a goal from Dennis Clarke and a hat-trick from Jeff Astle. West Ham captain Bobby Moore urged his team to push Albion hard in the second leg, even in the closing stages of the match when they still had all four goals from the first leg to catch up with. Goals from Geoff Hurst and Johnny Byrne for West Ham were cancelled out by goals from Stan Jones and Clarke by the 60th minute. The match finished with 2–2, thus Albion progressed due to a 6–2 aggregate victory.

== Match ==
=== Background ===
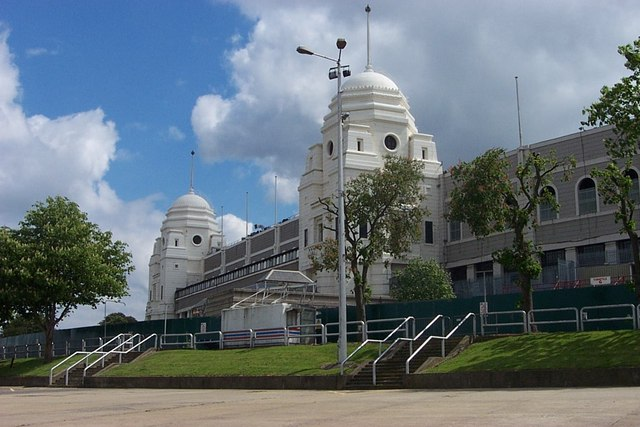
It was decided to hold the League Cup final at Wembley Stadium for the first time in 1967

It was decided at a Football Association Council meeting on 26 September 1966 to host the League Cup at Wembley Stadium for the first time. The final had previously been decided over two legs, but the move to Wembley coincided with a change in format to a single leg final. Albion were the defending champions and were aiming to become the first team to retain the Cup. The winner of the League Cup typically went on to play in the Inter-Cities Fairs Cup. Albion were still in the competition at the time of the final, although they had recently lost 3–0 to Bologna in the first leg of the third round.

Queens Park Rangers's strip for the final was all-white, instead of their normal white and blue hoops. West Bromwich Albion wore their away strip, which was all-red. Each team's supporters did not have a limit on the number of tickets they were allowed to purchase. This was despite a limit of 15,000 for FA Cup finals which were also held at Wembley. A crowd of nearly 100,000 was expected to be inside the stadium, although only highlights were to be shown on television.

=== First-half ===
Rangers started the slower of the two sides, with Albion passing the ball with some considerable pace. Any QPR attack stagnated once someone attempted to pass the ball through to Rodney Marsh or Les Allen, who were overwhelmed by the numbers of Albion defensive players. Albion's first goal came in the seventh minute as the ball was worked down the left hand side of the pitch by Tony Brown, Bobby Hope and finally Doug Fraser, before Clive Clark's shot went through a gap in QPR's defence. The Albion supporters began provocatively chanting "easy", although QPR were immediately on the attack with Albion goalkeeper Dick Sheppard saving a shot from Frank Sibley.

QPR continued to be outplayed for the most part by their First Division opponents. In the twenty fifth minute, Clark once again ran with the ball down the left hand side of the pitch, outrunning QPR's Ron Hunt, before crossing it into the path of Jeff Astle. His subsequent shot was saved by QPR goalkeeper Peter Springett, who managed to push the ball around the post. QPR briefly had a chance for a counterattack as Mark Lazarus found himself on the halfway line with the ball, before taking it around Ian Collard and found the Albion defence out of position, leaving him with a clear path to goal. But the opposition players were gaining on him as he approached the penalty area, with the attack falling apart shortly afterwards. Nine minutes before half time, QPR found themselves under attack by Albion again with some cross pitch passing resulting in Clark's second goal of the game. QPR had a corner just before half time which fell to the feet of club captain Mike Keen, but his shot went off the post. The game went into half time at 2–0 to Albion.

=== Second-half ===
The teams came out for the second half, and Rangers began an attack almost immediately. A series of short, quick passes from Marsh and Roger Morgan released Allen but he was not quick enough to make something of the chance. A high pass from Keen followed, striking defender Clarke in the back, from which the Albion defence were forced to clear. The attacks continued to come from Rangers as Lazarus passed the ball through to Marsh who took the ball around two defenders, but his shot went over the bar. QPR were rewarded for their perseverance in the sixty-third minute as Lazarus took the ball around Albion captain Graham Williams, crossing the ball in for Morgan, who scored with a header to reduce the deficit to a single goal.

Albion's sole goalscoring opportunity of the second half came afterwards; Clark took the ball on a lengthy run before crossing it into the box, across an open goal with no Albion player there to tap the ball in and put the game beyond QPR's reach. Fifteen minutes from the end of the match QPR equalised, Marsh's shot with his right foot went in off the post. A corner followed for QPR who were now dominating Albion with their style of play. Allen crossed it in to Lazarus, but the Albion goalkeeper saved the shot with his legs. With eight minutes to go, one of Albion defenders mis-kicked the ball in their own penalty area. Hunt rushed in for the chance but Sheppard once again saved the game for Albion. The ball ran free to Mike Lazarus who tapped the ball into the back of an empty net to increase the scoreline to 3–2 in QPR's favour. A final attack from QPR came in the closing moments of the game as Lazarus took the ball past two defenders and into the box, his subsequent shot hit the outside of the post and went wide.

=== Details ===
4 March 1967
15:00 BST

| Queens Park Rangers | 3–2 | West Bromwich Albion |
|---|---|---|
| Morgan 63'; Marsh 75'; Lazarus 81' | | Clark 7', 36' |

Wembley Stadium, London
Attendance: 97,952
Referee: Walter Crossley

| Queens Park Rangers | West Bromwich Albion |

| GK | 1 | (England) Peter Springett |
| DF | 2 | (England) Tony Hazell |
| DF | 3 | (England) Jim Langley |
| MF | 4 | (England) Mike Keen (c) |
| MF | 5 | (England) Ron Hunt |
| MF | 6 | (England) Frank Sibley |
| FW | 7 | (England) Mark Lazarus |
| FW | 8 | (England) Keith Sanderson |
| FW | 9 | (England) Les Allen |
| FW | 10 | (England) Rodney Marsh |
| FW | 11 | (England) Roger Morgan |
Substitute:
| FW | 12 | Ian Morgan |
Manager:
(England) Alec Stock

| GK | 1 | (England) Dick Sheppard |
| DF | 2 | (England) Bobby Cram |
| DF | 3 | (Wales) Graham Williams (c) |
| MF | 4 | (England) Ian Collard |
| MF | 5 | (England) Dennis Clarke |
| MF | 6 | (Scotland) Doug Fraser |
| FW | 7 | (England) Tony Brown |
| FW | 8 | (England) Jeff Astle |
| FW | 9 | (England) John Kaye |
| FW | 10 | (Scotland) Bobby Hope |
| FW | 11 | (England) Clive Clark |
Substitute:
| FW | 12 | Ken Foggo |
Manager:
(England) Jimmy Hagan

Match rules

- 90 minutes.
- 30 minutes of extra-time if necessary.
- Replay if scores still level.
- One named substitute.

== Post match ==
QPR's victory was the first occasion a team from the Third Division had won a major trophy in England. Both teams received £18,000 as their share of the gate receipts. QPR's victory created a problem for the Football League management committee. On previous occasions, one of the three nominations for the Inter-Cities Fairs Cup was the winner of the League Cup. However, the Fairs Cup committee required that only teams from the highest tier of a nation's league system could enter. In the end, Nottingham Forest, Leeds United and Liverpool qualified for the following season's competition.

QPR paraded the trophy in front of the crowd in their following home match at Loftus Road, where they defeated AFC Bournemouth 4–0. The 1966–67 season saw QPR do a double, winning the Third Division title as well. The season is considered to be the most successful season in the club's history. Albion reached the final again in 1970, where they were once again runners-up, this time to Manchester City. QPR did not reach the final until 1986 when they lost against Oxford United.

Before the match against Sheffield Wednesday on 11 March 2007, the 1967 cup winning team were paraded at half time at Loftus Road to celebrate the 40th anniversary of the win. In the 2002–03 Second Division play-off final QPR wore an all-white strip in reference to their Football League Cup victory. As of 2017, QPR's victory in the 1967 Football League Cup remains the only major trophy the club has won.
