= Alec Stock =

English football manager (1917–2001)

Personal information
- Full name: Alec William Alfred Stock
- Date of birth: 30 March 1917
- Place of birth: Peasedown St John, England
- Date of death: 16 April 2001 (aged 84)
- Place of death: Wimborne Minster, England
- Height: 5 ft 9 in (1.75 m)
- Position: Forward

Senior career*
| Years | Team | Apps | (Gls) |
| 1936–1938 | Charlton Athletic | 0 | (0) |
| 1938–1939 | Queens Park Rangers | 30 | (0) |
| 1945-1946 | Queens Park Rangers (guest) | 19 | (6) |
| 1946–1949 | Yeovil Town | | |

Managerial career
- 1946–1949: Yeovil Town
- 1949–1959: Leyton Orient
- 1957: AS Roma
- 1959–1968: Queens Park Rangers
- 1968–1972: Luton Town
- 1972–1976: Fulham
- 1978: Queens Park Rangers (caretaker)
- 1979–1980: AFC Bournemouth
- * Club domestic league appearances and goals

Alec William Alfred Stock (30 March 1917 – 16 April 2001) was an English football player and manager. He briefly managed AS Roma, between long spells at Leyton Orient and Queens Park Rangers. At QPR, he won successive promotions, leading the club to the First Division for the first time, and winning the League Cup. Among managers for whom accurate statistics exist, he is the fourth most experienced manager of all time.

== Career ==
Alec Stock was born in Peasedown St John, Somerset, and played as an inside-forward for Charlton Athletic and Queens Park Rangers before World War II and guested for several other clubs during the hostilities. During the war he was a Captain in the Tank Corps and in 1944 was wounded in Normandy. He rejoined Queens Park Rangers in 1945 and later joined Yeovil Town in 1946.

He came to prominence as the player/manager of Yeovil Town during a historic FA Cup run in 1949. They had thrilling victories over Bury and Sunderland, before losing to Manchester United in the fifth round. He later managed Leyton Orient (1949–1959), AS Roma, Queens Park Rangers (1959–1965) (general manager 1965–1968), Luton Town (1968–1972), Fulham (1972–1976) and AFC Bournemouth (1979–1980). He was also the assistant manager of Arsenal for 53 days during the 1955–56 season and was a director of Queens Park Rangers (1977–1979). He was asked to manage the Third Division South team against the North in 1955–56.

It was perhaps Stock's time as manager of Queens Park Rangers where he is most fondly remembered. It was during his spell in the 1960s that coincided with the development of the club with chairman Jim Gregory. The team enjoyed unprecedented success in 1967 and 1968 winning consecutive promotions with the club reaching the First Division for the first time and becoming the first Third Division team to win the Football League Cup in 1967 beating then First Division West Bromwich Albion 3–2 in a come from behind win. Stock had a focus on youth bringing many of the team through the club's youth system (including Frank Sibley, Tony Hazell, Roger Morgan, Ian Morgan and Mick Leach) as well as blending characters such as Rodney Marsh and Mark Lazarus into the set up.

With internal pressures mounting in the club following the 1967–68 season however, Stock was absent for three months, suffering from asthma. In his book A Little Thing Called Pride, Stock tells how Jim Gregory sacked him in 1968 for being ill, just as he thought he was about to return to the helm and save Rangers from relegation. He later had success with Luton Town who he helped to promotion from the Third Division and also with Fulham when he led them to the 1975 FA Cup final. He briefly returned to be a Director at Queens Park Rangers in the 1977/8 season.

Ron Manager, a character in BBC comedy sketch show The Fast Show is based on Stock, told by George Best in his autobiography. This was also confirmed by comedy actor Paul Whitehouse, who played Ron Manager, in the documentary, Suits You Sir – The Inside Leg of the Fast Show.

== Managerial statistics ==
| Team | From | To | Record | | | | |
| Team | From | To | G | W | D | L | Win % |
|---|---|---|---|---|---|---|---|
| Yeovil Town | February 1946 | September 1949 | 153 | 80 | 32 | 41 | 52.29 |
| Leyton Orient | September 1949 | June 1959 | 464 | 181 | 95 | 188 | 39.01 |
| Roma | August 1957 | November 1957 | 11 | 4 | 6 | 1 | 36.36 |
| Queens Park Rangers | June 1959 | August 1968 | 459 | 219 | 106 | 134 | 47.71 |
| Luton Town | August 1968 | June 1972 | 178 | 75 | 57 | 46 | 42.13 |
| Fulham | July 1972 | July 1976 | 220 | 75 | 73 | 72 | 34.09 |
| Queens Park Rangers (caretaker) | July 1978 | August 1978 | 0 | 0 | 0 | 0 | — |
| AFC Bournemouth | January 1979 | December 1980 | 99 | 30 | 31 | 38 | 30.30 |
| Total | | | 1,584 | 664 | 400 | 520 | 41.92 |

== Honours ==
Queens Park Rangers

- Football League Cup: 1966–67

== See also ==
- List of football managers with the most matches
