= Keetch =

Keetch is a surname. Notable people with the surname include:

- Bobby Keetch (1941–1996), British footballer
- Paul Keetch (1961–2017), British politician and lobbyist
- Von G. Keetch (1960–2018), American lawyer and Mormon general authority
