= Keith Sanderson =

Keith Sanderson may refer to:

- Keith Sanderson (footballer) (1940–2022), English footballer
- Keith Sanderson (sport shooter) (born 1975), American rapid fire pistol shooter
