= Ian Collard =

English footballer

Personal information
- Full name: Ian Collard
- Date of birth: 31 August 1947 (age 79)
- Place of birth: Easington Colliery, County Durham, England
- Position: Midfielder

Senior career*
Years	Team	Apps	(Gls)
1964–1969	West Bromwich Albion	69	(7)
1969–1976	Ipswich Town	92	(5)
1975	→Portsmouth (loan)	1	(0)
Total		162	(12)
- * Club domestic league appearances and goals

Ian Collard (born 31 August 1947) is an English former professional footballer. During his career he made 69 appearances for West Bromwich Albion, winning the FA Cup in 1968, before moving to Ipswich Town in 1969 where he made 92 league appearances under the management of Bobby Robson. He had a loan spell at Portsmouth near the end of his time at Portman Road, before leaving the club in 1976 and calling time on his professional career at the age of 29.

== Honours ==
West Bromwich Albion

- FA Cup: 1967–68
- Football League Cup runner-up: 1966–67
