= Ron Springett =

English footballer (1935–2015)

- Springett in 1962

Personal information
- Full name: Ronald Deryk George Springett
- Date of birth: 22 July 1935
- Place of birth: Fulham, London, England
- Date of death: 12 September 2015 (aged 80)
- Place of death: Kingston upon Thames, England
- Height: 5 ft 10 in (1.78 m)
- Position: Goalkeeper

Youth career
- Victoria United

Senior career*
Years	Team	Apps	(Gls)
1953–1958	Queens Park Rangers	88	(0)
1958–1967	Sheffield Wednesday	345	(0)
1967–1969	Queens Park Rangers	45	(0)
Total		478	(0)

International career
1959–1966	England	33	(0)
1963	England (representative)	1	(0)
1960–1966	The Football League XI	9	(0)
Medal record
Men's football
Representing England
FIFA World Cup
Winner	1966 England
- * Club domestic league appearances and goals

Ronald Deryk George Springett (22 July 1935 – 12 September 2015) was an English professional footballer who played as a goalkeeper.

He began his career with QPR in 1953 where he made 147 appearances over two spells. He had a nine-year spell with Sheffield Wednesday between 1958 and 1967 and amassed 384 appearances for them before returning to QPR to finish his career.

He earned 33 caps for England between 1959 and 1966 and was part of the squad that won the 1966 FIFA World Cup.

== Club career ==
Springett began his career at QPR in 1953. While at QPR, he was selected to play in the Third Division South representative team in 1957. He moved to Sheffield Wednesday for £10,000 in 1958 and made 384 appearances for Wednesday before returning to QPR in May 1967. As part of that deal, his brother Peter, also a goalkeeper, moved to Wednesday from QPR.

Springett was a member of the Sheffield Wednesday team beaten 3–2 by Everton in the 1966 FA Cup Final at Wembley.

== International career ==
Springett made 33 capped appearances and one uncapped representative appearance* for England (*uncapped match - part of Football Association's centenary celebrations), all while at Sheffield Wednesday and until then the most international appearances by any Sheffield Wednesday player. He held this club record for 26 years until it was broken by Nigel Worthington. He made his England debut against Northern Ireland at Wembley in 1959 saving a Jimmy McIlroy penalty just before half-time to help secure a narrow 2–1 victory. He also saved a penalty in a match against Peru in May 1962. He had been the first choice goalkeeper during the 1962 World Cup in Chile. His final cap was against Norway in 1966 shortly before the World Cup finals. At international level, Springett also made 9 appearances for the Football League (team drawn from players of all Football League teams irrespective of nationality).

England appearances
Cap	Date	Home team	Sc.	Away team
1	18 November 1959	England	2-1	Northern Ireland
2	19 April 1960	Scotland	1-1	England
3	11 May 1960	England	3-3	Yugoslavia
4	15 May 1960	Spain	3-0	England
5	22 May 1960	Hungary	2-0	England
6	8 October 1960	Northern Ireland	2-5	England
7	19 October 1960	Luxembourg	0-9	England
8	26 October 1960	England	4-2	Spain
9	15 April 1961	England	9-3	Scotland
10	10 May 1961	England	8-0	Mexico
11	21 May 1961	Portugal	1-1	England
12	24 May 1961	Italy	2-3	England
13	27 May 1961	Austria	3-1	England
14	28 September 1961	England	4-1	Luxembourg
15	14 October 1961	Wales	1-1	England
16	25 October 1961	England	2-0	Portugal
17	22 November 1961	England	1-1	Northern Ireland
18	4 April 1962	England	3-1	Austria
19	14 April 1962	Scotland	0-2	England
20	9 May 1962	England	3-1	Switzerland
21	20 May 1962	Peru	0-4	England
22	31 May 1962	Hungary	2-1	England
23	2 June 1962	England	3-1	Argentina
24	7 June 1962	Bulgaria	0-0	England
25	10 June 1962	Brazil	3-1	England
26	3 October 1962	England	1-1	France
27	20 October 1962	Northern Ireland	1-3	England
28	21 November 1962	England	4-0	Wales
29	27 February 1963	France	5-2	England
uc	24 May 1963	England	3-3	Football League
30	5 June 1963	Switzerland	1-8	England
31	2 October 1965	Wales	0-0	England
32	20 October 1965	England	2-3	Austria
33	29 June 1966	Norway	1-6	England

He was allocated the No.12 shirt as a member of the England squad that won the 1966 World Cup by beating West Germany by 4 goals to 2. However, only the 11 players on the pitch during that match received winners' medals. Following a Football Association led campaign to persuade FIFA to award medals to all the winners' squad members, it was announced by FIFA, on 26 November 2007, that all non-starting members of World Cup winning squads (1930–1974 competitions) would also receive a winners medal. This list included Ron Springett, and so, on 10 June 2009, Springett was presented with his medal by British Prime Minister Gordon Brown at a ceremony at 10 Downing Street.

Football League appearances
App.	Date	Home team	Sc.	Away team
1	23 September 1959	Irish Football League	0-5	Football League
2	4 November 1959	Football League	2-0	League of Ireland
3	1 November 1960	Italian League	4-2	Football League
4	22 March 1961	Scottish Football League	3-2	Football League
5	11 October 1961	Football League	5-2	League of Ireland
6	8 November 1961	Football League	0-2	Italian League
7	21 March 1962	Football League	3-4	Scottish Football League
8	29 November 1962	Football League	3-2	Italian League
9	16 March 1966	Football League	1-3	Scottish Football League

== Testimonial ==
Sheffield Wednesday held a testimonial for Ronald Springett on 25 September 1967 at Hillsborough Stadium. (A Sheffield United XI beat a Sheffield Wednesday XI 3–2) The game was watched by 23,070 fans. Following his death, Sheffield Wednesday honoured Ron by featuring him on the cover of the matchday programme and observing a minutes applause prior to the home game against Fulham on 19 September 2015. Wednesday won the game 3–2. In a post match interview, Owls head coach Carlos Carvalhal dedicated the win to Springett.

== Style of play ==
Springett has been described by The Independent as a clever, consistent, "brave and agile goalkeeper", with an excellent positional sense. Despite his small stature and lack of physicality, which gave him a slight disadvantage against larger, more physical centre-forwards, he was "adept at choosing the precise moment to smother shots at the feet of attackers, accepting that such plunges would result in occasional injuries. Swift of foot, deftly assured with his hands and adept at judging when to leave his goal-line, he could be a gloriously entertaining performer, though for all his acrobatics, his lack of height occasionally made him vulnerable to sudden long shots." Regarded as one of England's greatest ever goalkeepers, he was known for his determination, athleticism, and the "thoroughness of his preparation, as he kept a notebook in which recorded the preferred spot-kick methods of all his leading opponents".

== Personal life ==
Ron Springett had a daughter Terri Springett who also played professional football.

== Death ==
Springett died on 12 September 2015.

== Honours ==
Sheffield Wednesday

- Football League Second Division: 1958–59
- FA Cup runner-up: 1965–66

England

- FIFA World Cup: 1966
