= 1966–67 Football League Cup =

1966–67 League Cup
Tournament details
- Country: England; Wales
- Teams: 90

Final positions
- Champions: Queens Park Rangers
- Runners-up: West Bromwich Albion

Tournament statistics
- Top goal scorer: Geoff Hurst (9 goals)

The 1966–67 Football League Cup was the seventh season of the Football League Cup, a knockout competition for England's top 92 football clubs. The competition started on 23 August 1966 and ended with the final on 4 March 1967. This was the first season during which Arsenal, Tottenham Hotspur, and Wolverhampton participated in the League Cup; Everton and Liverpool were the only League teams that did not compete.

The final was contested by Third Division side Queens Park Rangers and First Division side West Bromwich Albion at Wembley Stadium in London; this was the first League Cup final to take place at a neutral venue, instead of as a two-legged tie. Clive Clark scored twice in the first half to give West Bromwich Albion a 2–0 half-time lead. However, second-half goals from Queens Park Rangers' Roger Morgan, Rodney Marsh, and Mark Lazarus turned the game around. Queens Park Rangers, who also won the Third Division championship this season, eventually won the match 3–2 to claim the trophy.

Match dates and results were initially drawn from Soccerbase, and they were later checked against Rothmans Football Yearbook 1970–71.

== Calendar ==
Of the 90 teams, 38 received a bye to the second round (teams ranked 1st–40th in the 1965–66 Football League, excluding 2 teams that did not compete) and the other 52 played in the first round. The semi-finals were two-legged.

Round	Main date	Fixtures		Clubs	New entries this round
Round	Main date	Original	Replays	Clubs	New entries this round
First Round	24 August 1966	26	10	90 → 64	52 (teams ranked 19th–22nd in Second Division; all Third and Fourth Division)
Second Round	14 September 1966	32	11	64 → 32	38 (all First Division, except those teams that did not enter; teams ranked 1st–18th in Second Division)
Third Round	5 October 1966	16	5	32 → 16	none
Fourth Round	26 October 1966	8	1	16 → 8	none
Fifth Round	7 December 1966	4	0	8 → 4	none
Semi-finals	17/18 January & 7/8 February 1967	4	0	4 → 2	none
Final	4 March 1967	1	0	2 → 1	none

== First round ==
=== Ties ===
Home team	Score	Away team	Date
Aldershot	2–2	Luton Town	24 August 1966
Barnsley	1–2	Grimsby Town	24 August 1966
Barrow	2–1	Oldham Athletic	24 August 1966
Bradford City	1–1	Doncaster Rovers	24 August 1966
Bradford Park Avenue	2–2	Hartlepools United	23 August 1966
Brentford	0–0	Millwall	24 August 1966
Brighton & Hove Albion	1–0	Leyton Orient	24 August 1966
Bury	2–0	Rochdale	23 August 1966
Cardiff City	1–0	Bristol Rovers	24 August 1966
Chester	2–5	Tranmere Rovers	24 August 1966
Chesterfield	2–1	Scunthorpe United	24 August 1966
Crewe Alexandra	1–0	Stockport County	24 August 1966
Exeter City	2–2	Torquay United	24 August 1966
Halifax Town	0–0	Darlington	23 August 1966
Lincoln City	1–0	Hull City	24 August 1966
Middlesbrough	0–0	York City	24 August 1966
Newport County	1–2	Swansea Town	24 August 1966
Notts County	1–1	Mansfield Town	24 August 1966
Peterborough United	2–1	Oxford United	24 August 1966
Port Vale	1–3	Walsall	23 August 1966
Queens Park Rangers	5–0	Colchester United	23 August 1966
Shrewsbury Town	6–1	Wrexham	24 August 1966
Southend United	0–0	Gillingham	24 August 1966
Southport	0–1	Workington	24 August 1966
Swindon Town	2–1	Bournemouth & Boscombe Athletic	24 August 1966
Watford	1–1	Reading	23 August 1966

=== Replays ===
Home team	Score	Away team	Date
Darlington	4–0	Halifax Town	29 August 1966
Doncaster Rovers	5–2	Bradford City	30 August 1966
Gillingham	2–0	Southend United	31 August 1966
Hartlepools United	1–2	Bradford Park Avenue	31 August 1966
Luton Town	1–2	Aldershot	29 August 1966
Mansfield Town	3–0	Notts County	29 August 1966
Millwall	0–1	Brentford	29 August 1966
Reading	1–0	Watford	29 August 1966
Torquay United	1–2	Exeter City	31 August 1966
York City	2–1	Middlesbrough	29 August 1966

== Second round ==
=== Ties ===
Home team	Score	Away team	Date
Aldershot	1–1	Queens Park Rangers	14 September 1966
Arsenal	1–1	Gillingham	13 September 1966
Blackburn Rovers	4–1	Barrow	14 September 1966
Blackpool	5–1	Manchester United	14 September 1966
Bradford Park Avenue	0–0	Grimsby Town	14 September 1966
Brentford	2–4	Ipswich Town	13 September 1966
Bristol City	1–1	Swansea Town	13 September 1966
Bury	2–3	Workington	14 September 1966
Cardiff City	0–1	Exeter City	14 September 1966
Carlisle United	1–1	Tranmere Rovers	14 September 1966
Chelsea	5–2	Charlton Athletic	14 September 1966
Coventry City	2–1	Derby County	13 September 1966
Darlington	1–1	Doncaster Rovers	14 September 1966
Fulham	2–0	Crystal Palace	13 September 1966
Leeds United	1–0	Newcastle United	13 September 1966
Leicester City	5–0	Reading	14 September 1966
Lincoln City	2–1	Huddersfield Town	14 September 1966
Manchester City	3–1	Bolton Wanderers	14 September 1966
Northampton Town	2–2	Peterborough United	14 September 1966
Norwich City	0–1	Brighton & Hove Albion	14 September 1966
Nottingham Forest	1–1	Birmingham City	13 September 1966
Preston North End	2–0	Crewe Alexandra	14 September 1966
Sheffield Wednesday	0–1	Rotherham United	14 September 1966
Shrewsbury Town	1–1	Burnley	14 September 1966
Southampton	4–3	Plymouth Argyle	14 September 1966
Sunderland	1–1	Sheffield United	14 September 1966
Swindon Town	4–1	Portsmouth	13 September 1966
Walsall	2–1	Stoke City	13 September 1966
West Bromwich Albion	6–1	Aston Villa	14 September 1966
West Ham United	1–0	Tottenham Hotspur	14 September 1966
Wolverhampton	2–1	Mansfield Town	13 September 1966
York City	3–2	Chesterfield	13 September 1966

=== Replays ===
Home team	Score	Away team	Date
Birmingham City	2–1	Nottingham Forest	20 September 1966
Burnley	5–0	Shrewsbury Town	29 September 1966
Doncaster Rovers	2–0	Darlington	19 September 1966
Gillingham	1–1	Arsenal	21 September 1966
Grimsby Town	3–1	Bradford Park Avenue	21 September 1966
Peterborough United	0–2	Northampton Town	26 September 1966
Queens Park Rangers	2–0	Aldershot	20 September 1966
Sheffield United	1–0	Sunderland	20 September 1966
Swansea Town	2–1	Bristol City	19 September 1966
Tranmere Rovers	0–2	Carlisle United	21 September 1966

=== 2nd replay ===
Home team	Score	Away team	Date
Arsenal	5–0	Gillingham	28 September 1966

== Third round ==
=== Ties ===
Home team	Score	Away team	Date
Arsenal	1–3	West Ham United	5 October 1966
Birmingham City	2–1	Ipswich Town	4 October 1966
Blackpool	1–1	Chelsea	5 October 1966
Brighton & Hove Albion	1–1	Coventry City	5 October 1966
Doncaster Rovers	1–1	Swindon Town	4 October 1966
Exeter City	1–2	Walsall	5 October 1966
Fulham	5–0	Wolverhampton	5 October 1966
Grimsby Town	3–0	Workington	5 October 1966
Leicester City	5–0	Lincoln City	5 October 1966
Northampton Town	2–1	Rotherham United	5 October 1966
Preston North End	1–1	Leeds United	4 October 1966
Sheffield United	2–0	Burnley	12 October 1966
Southampton	3–3	Carlisle United	5 October 1966
Queens Park Rangers	2–1	Swansea Town	8 October 1966
West Bromwich Albion	4–2	Manchester City	5 October 1966
York City	0–2	Blackburn Rovers	4 October 1966

=== Replays ===
Home team	Score	Away team	Date
Carlisle United	2–1	Southampton	12 October 1966
Chelsea	1–3	Blackpool	17 October 1966
Coventry City	1–3	Brighton & Hove Albion	11 October 1966
Leeds United	3–0	Preston North End	12 October 1966
Swindon Town	4–2	Doncaster Rovers	11 October 1966

== Fourth round ==
=== Ties ===
Home team	Score	Away team	Date
Blackpool	4–2	Fulham	26 October 1966
Brighton & Hove Albion	1–1	Northampton Town	26 October 1966
Carlisle United	4–0	Blackburn Rovers	26 October 1966
Grimsby Town	2–4	Birmingham City	26 October 1966
Queens Park Rangers	4–2	Leicester City	25 October 1966
Sheffield United	2–1	Walsall	26 October 1966
Swindon Town	0–2	West Bromwich Albion	25 October 1966
West Ham United	7–0	Leeds United	7 November 1966

=== Replays ===
Home team	Score	Away team	Date
Northampton Town	8–0	Brighton & Hove Albion	8 November 1966

== Fifth round ==
=== Ties ===
Home team	Score	Away team	Date
Blackpool	1–3	West Ham United	7 December 1966
Northampton Town	1–3	West Bromwich Albion	7 December 1966
Queens Park Rangers	2–1	Carlisle United	7 December 1966
Sheffield United	2–3	Birmingham City	7 December 1966

== Semi-finals ==
=== First leg ===
Home team	Score	Away team	Date
Birmingham City	1–4	Queens Park Rangers	17 January 1967
West Bromwich Albion	4–0	West Ham United	18 January 1967

=== Second leg ===
Home team	Score	Away team	Date	Agg
Queens Park Rangers	3–1	Birmingham City	7 February 1967	7–2
West Ham United	2–2	West Bromwich Albion	8 February 1967	2–6

== Final ==
The final was held at Wembley Stadium, London on 4 March 1967.

4 March 1967

Queens Park Rangers	3–2	West Bromwich Albion
R. Morgan 63'; Marsh 75'; Lazarus 81'	Summary	7' 36' C. Clark

Wembley Stadium, London
Attendance: 97,952
Referee: Walter Crossley

Queens Park Rangers	West Bromwich Albion

QUEENS PARK RANGERS:
1	Peter Springett
2	Tony Hazell
3	Jim Langley
4	Mike Keen (c)
5	Ron Hunt
6	Frank Sibley
7	Mark Lazarus
8	Keith Sanderson
9	Les Allen
10	Rodney Marsh
11	Roger Morgan
Manager:
Alec Stock

WEST BROMWICH ALBION:
1	Dick Sheppard
2	Bobby Cram
3	Graham Williams (c)
4	Ian Collard
5	Dennis Clarke
6	Doug Fraser
7	Tony Brown
8	Jeff Astle
9	John Kaye
10	Bobby Hope
11	Clive Clark
Manager:
Jimmy Hagan

MATCH RULES

- 90 minutes.
- 30 minutes of extra-time if necessary.
- Replay if scores still level.
- One named substitute.
