= Bobby Finch =

English footballer

Personal information
- Full name: Robert Finch
- Date of birth: 24 August 1948
- Place of birth: Camberwell, England
- Date of death: 18 September 1978 (aged 30)
- Place of death: Beckenham, England
- Position: Full back

Youth career
- 1966–1968: Queens Park Rangers

Senior career*
Years	Team	Apps	(Gls)
1968–1969	Queens Park Rangers	6	(0)
- Cape Town City
- * Club domestic league appearances and goals

Robert Finch (24 August 1948 – 18 September 1978) was an English professional footballer who played as a full back.

== Career ==
Finch turned professional with Queens Park Rangers in 1966 before making his senior debut two years later. In total, Finch made six appearances for Queens Park Rangers in the Football League between 1968 and 1969. Finch later played in South Africa for Cape Town City, before dying of meningitis on 18 September 1978, at the age of 30.
