= Keith Sanderson (footballer) =

English footballer (1940–2022)

Personal information
- Date of birth: 9 October 1940
- Place of birth: Hull, Yorkshire, England
- Date of death: 24 December 2022 (aged 82)
- Place of death: Levens, Cumbria, England
- Position: Midfielder

Senior career*
Years	Team	Apps	(Gls)
1962–1963	Harwich & Parkeston		
1963–1964	Bath City		
1964	Toronto City		
1964–1965	Plymouth Argyle	29	(2)
1965–1969	Queens Park Rangers	104	(10)
1969–1970	Goole Town		
1970–1971	Wimbledon	28	(0)
Total		151	(12)
- * Club domestic league appearances and goals

Keith Sanderson (9 October 1940 – 24 December 2022) was an English footballer who played as a midfielder for Queens Park Rangers in the 1960s.

== Career ==
Sanderson made his debut for Queens Park Rangers in the 6–1 defeat by local rivals, Brentford, on the opening day of the 1965–66 season after signing from Plymouth Argyle. Things got better and Sanderson was part of the successful 1966–67 team managed by Alec Stock that won both the Third Division Championship and the Football League Cup Final 1967 at Wembley beating WBA 3–2.

Sanderson was a tireless midfielder, doing the running for more glamorous colleagues like Rodney Marsh and went on to play 104 league games, scoring 10 goals. Sanderson was also remarkable in that he was a part-time player (he worked in computers in his "day job").

== Death ==
Sanderson died in a traffic collision on 24 December 2022 near Levens, Cumbria, at the age of 82.

== Honours ==
Queens Park Rangers

- Football League Cup: 1966–67
