= Mike Kelly (footballer, born 1942) =

English footballer (born 1942)

Personal information
- Full name: Michael John Kelly
- Date of birth: 18 October 1942 (age 84)
- Place of birth: Northampton, England
- Position: Goalkeeper

Senior career*
Years	Team	Apps	(Gls)
1958–1966	Wimbledon	139	(0)
1966–1970	Queens Park Rangers	54	(0)
1970–1976	Birmingham City	62	(0)
1976	Minnesota Kicks	1	(0)
Total		256	(0)

International career
	England (amateur)	3	(0)

Managerial career
- 1977–1978: Plymouth Argyle
- * Club domestic league appearances and goals

Michael John Kelly (born 18 October 1942) is an English former professional footballer who played as a goalkeeper. He made 116 appearances in the Football League playing for Queens Park Rangers and Birmingham City. He went on to managerial positions, including nine months as manager of Plymouth Argyle, before concentrating on coaching.

== Playing career ==
Born in Northampton, Kelly started his football career as a junior with Chelsea, but after two seasons (1959/60 and 1960/1), he was released and joined Wimbledon in the Isthmian League, as an amateur player. He was in the Wimbledon teams which beat Sutton United in the final of the FA Amateur Cup in 1963, won the championship of the Isthmian League in two consecutive seasons, and finished runners-up in the Southern League First Division. During this period he was capped three times for the England national amateur football team.

In 1966 he turned professional with Queens Park Rangers, spending four seasons with the club. He then moved on to Birmingham City, where he spent six years, followed by one season as player-coach of the Minnesota Kicks in the NASL, before returning to England to start a career in coaching.

== Coaching career ==
On his return to England Kelly was appointed reserve team manager of Plymouth Argyle. When manager Tony Waiters resigned, Kelly took his place, himself resigning after nine months with the team seemingly heading for relegation. He went on to assistant manager roles at Fulham, Crystal Palace and West Bromwich Albion.

He was England goalkeeping coach from 1984 to 1990 and worked with the team in two World Cups, then performed a similar role with the Switzerland national football team until the 1994 World Cup. He then returned to the England set-up and was goalkeeping coach during Euro 96. At club level he worked with many clubs in England and abroad, and in December 2007 he joined Fulham F.C. as goalkeeping coach and assistant manager under Roy Hodgson, with whom he had worked at club and national level. In 2010, he followed Hodgson to Liverpool. He left following Hodgson's departure.
