= Peter Springett =

English footballer (1946–1997)

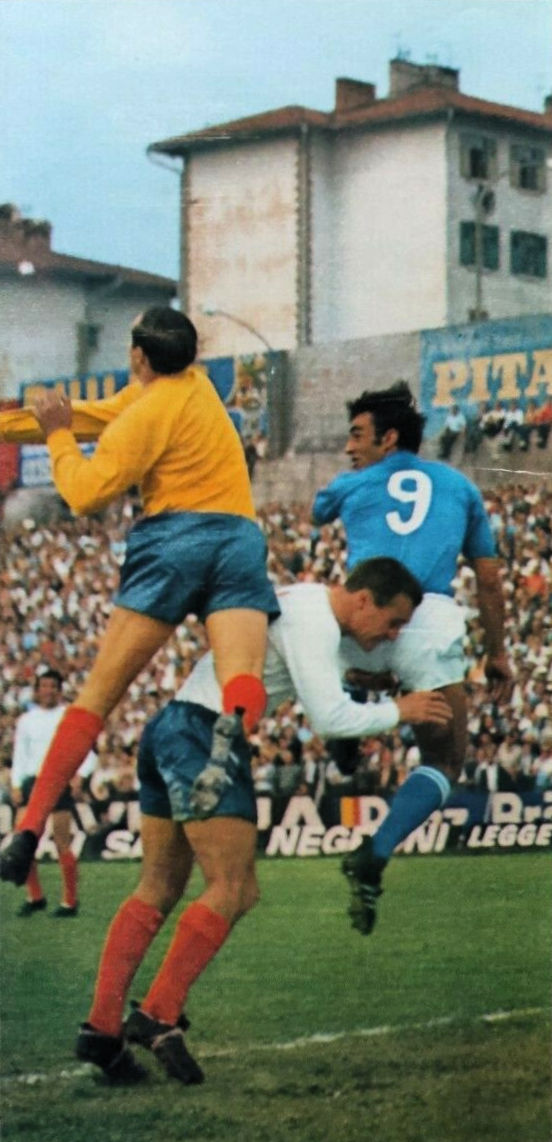
- Springett (left) playing for England U23 in 1968

Personal information
- Date of birth: 8 May 1946
- Place of birth: Fulham, London, England
- Date of death: 28 August 1997 (aged 51)
- Place of death: Sheffield, England
- Height: 5 ft 10 in (1.78 m)
- Position: Goalkeeper

Senior career*
Years	Team	Apps	(Gls)
1962–1967	Queens Park Rangers	137	(0)
1967–1975	Sheffield Wednesday	180	(0)
1975–1980	Barnsley	191	(0)
1980–1981	Scarborough	36	(0)
	Frickley Athletic		(0)
Total		508	(0)

International career
- England U23
- * Club domestic league appearances and goals

Peter Springett (8 May 1946 – 28 September 1997) was an English professional footballer in the 1960s and 1970s and the brother of fellow professional footballer Ron Springett. He made over 500 professional appearances in the football league as a goalkeeper.

== Career ==
He played in goal for Queen's Park Rangers and later Sheffield Wednesday, Barnsley, Scarborough and Frickley Athletic.

He made his debut in 1963 against Peterborough United and went on to play 137 league games for QPR. Peter was part of the QPR team in 1966–67 that won both the Third Division Championship and the League Cup, beating West Bromwich Albion 3–2 at Wembley Stadium on 4 March 1967.

He moved to Sheffield Wednesday in 1967 in a unique swap deal for his brother, England international Ron Springett.

== International career ==
He made appearances at youth level for England, but unlike his elder brother he was never capped as a full international.

== Later life ==
After retiring from the game he became a police officer and was present when the stolen European Cup was handed in at West Bar Police Station after Aston Villa's 1982 win.

== Death ==
His death in Sheffield on 28 August 1997 came at the end of a four-year battle against cancer.

== Honours ==
Queens Park Rangers

- Football League Cup: 1966–67
