= Ron Hunt (footballer, born 1945) =

English footballer (1945–2018)

Personal information
- Date of birth: 19 December 1945
- Place of birth: Paddington, London, England
- Date of death: 23 August 2018 (aged 72)
- Place of death: England
- Position: Defender

Youth career
- Queens Park Rangers

Senior career*
Years	Team	Apps	(Gls)
1963–1973	Queens Park Rangers	219	(1)
- * Club domestic league appearances and goals

Ron Hunt (19 December 1945 – 23 August 2018) was an English footballer who made 219 appearances in the Football League playing as a defender for Queens Park Rangers in the 1960s and early 1970s.

== Career ==
Hunt came through the youth ranks at Queens Park Rangers, and made his professional debut in December 1964 in the 3–1 victory against Bristol Rovers. He was a member of the 1966–67 side that won both the Third Division Championship and the League Cup; his pass and subsequent collision with the goalkeeper set up the third and winning goal for Mark Lazarus as QPR defeated West Bromwich Albion 3–2 at Wembley Stadium.

Hunt played 219 league games for Rangers before injury forced retirement in 1973. He then became a squash coach and then worked for a petrochemical company.

He died on 23 August 2018 aged 72.

== Honours ==
Queens Park Rangers

- Football League Cup: 1966–67
