= Ian Morgan =

English footballer

- Morgan in 2026

Personal information
- Full name: Ian Arthur Morgan
- Date of birth: 14 November 1946 (age 79)
- Place of birth: Walthamstow, London, England
- Position: Winger

Youth career
- Queens Park Rangers

Senior career*
Years	Team	Apps	(Gls)
1964–1973	Queens Park Rangers	173	(26)
1973–1974	Watford	16	(1)
- * Club domestic league appearances and goals

Ian Arthur Morgan (born 14 November 1946) is an English former footballer, born in Walthamstow, London, who played as a winger in the Football League for Queens Park Rangers and Watford in the 1960s and 1970s.

== Career ==
Morgan came through the ranks at Queens Park Rangers to make his debut in a 2–1 win over Hull City on 26 September 1964. He played 173 league games for QPR scoring 26 goals before joining former club captain Mike Keen at Watford in 1973.

His twin brother Roger also played for QPR.

Both brothers went on to play non-league football in seasons 1975–76 and 1976–77 for Barking and Ware.

== Honours ==
Queens Park Rangers

- Football League Cup: 1966–67
