= Bobby Keetch =

English footballer

Personal information
- Date of birth: 25 October 1941
- Place of birth: Tottenham, Greater London
- Date of death: 29 June 1996 (aged 54)
- Position: Defender

Youth career
- West Ham United

Senior career*
| Years | Team | Apps | (Gls) |
| 1962–1966 | Fulham | 106 | (2) |
| 1966–1969 | Queens Park Rangers | 53 | (0) |
| 1969–? | Durban City F.C. | ? | (?) |
- * Club domestic league appearances and goals

Bobby D. Keetch (25 October 1941 – 29 June 1996) was a footballer who played as a defender for West Ham United, Fulham and QPR.

Keetch was a centre-half. After a brief career at West Ham United, he joined Fulham in 1959 and played for the club between 1961 and 1966, making 106 first team appearances, scoring two goals. He signed for QPR in 1966 from Fulham. Keetch played 52 league games for QPR before joining Durban City in 1969. After three seasons in Durban, he retired in 1971. Keetch was quite a man-about-town and an entrepreneur in business.

He died, aged 54, on 29 June 1996, after suffering a stroke. Fulham FC were desperately short of money in 1996 and in the lowest league. Jimmy Hill has said that the club had so little money that they could not afford a wreath at Keetch's funeral, but somehow they managed it.
