= Rodney Marsh =

English former professional footballer

- Marsh in 2026

Personal information
- Full name: Rodney William Marsh
- Date of birth: 11 October 1944 (age 82)
- Place of birth: Hatfield, England
- Height: 6 ft 1 in (1.85 m)
- Position: Forward

Youth career
- 1959–1960: West Ham United
- 1960–1962: Fulham

Senior career*
Years	Team	Apps	(Gls)
1962–1966	Fulham	63	(22)
1966–1972	Queens Park Rangers	211	(106)
1972–1976	Manchester City	118	(36)
1975	Cork Hibernians	3	(1)
1976–1979	Tampa Bay Rowdies	94	(48)
1976–1977	→ Fulham (loan)	16	(5)
1986–1987	Tampa Bay Rowdies (indoor)		
Total		505	(218)

International career
1968	England U23	3	(4)
1971–1973	England	9	(1)

Managerial career
- 1980: New York United
- 1980–1983: Carolina Lightnin'
- 1984–1986: Tampa Bay Rowdies
- * Club domestic league appearances and goals

Rodney William Marsh (born 11 October 1944) is an English former footballer and football coach; he later worked as a broadcaster. A forward, he won nine caps for England between 1971 and 1973, scoring one international goal.

Brought up in North London, he played youth football for West Ham United before he made his professional debut with Fulham in March 1963. He scored 22 goals in 63 First Division games before falling out with the management and taking a £15,000 transfer to Queens Park Rangers in March 1966. He helped QPR win the 1967 League Cup and to consecutive promotions through the Third Division and Second Division. In March 1972 he was sold to Manchester City for £200,000. He featured in the 1974 League Cup final defeat but his time in Manchester was largely disappointing and he left the UK the following year to play for American club Tampa Bay Rowdies.

Marsh had a successful career with the Rowdies and went on to coach the club from 1984 to 1986 after previously having brief spells coaching New York United and the Carolina Lightnin'. In the 1990s he began work as a broadcaster on Sky Sports, before he was sacked in January 2005. Since that time he has appeared on numerous reality television shows, and helped to run an American-based property development company with his son. In 2015, Marsh started co-hosting a radio show about football on SiriusXM, titled Grumpy Pundits. His co-host is Irish broadcaster Tommy Smyth.

== Early life ==
Marsh was born in Hatfield, Hertfordshire, to Lilian Dredge, a housewife, and William Marsh, a docker. His parents only spent a few days in Hertfordshire so his mother could avoid going into labour during the Blitz. Marsh grew up in Palatine Road, Stoke Newington, North London, and he had a rough upbringing as a child, particularly from his father, and in his autobiography said that this tough upbringing left him emotionally traumatised. His father came from an even more violent family, and was partially crippled at the age of 19 after being attacked by his father with a hammer. An only child, Marsh described his family as "incredibly poor" and until the age of 11 he slept in the corner of his parents' bedroom – the family shared a three-storey house with two other families and the only other room they had was a living room. He attended Arsenal matches at Highbury with his father, and also went along to see reserve team matches. The family's poverty came to an end just as Marsh was beginning his professional football career – his father used to help the landlord to fill out his weekly pool coupon, and the landlord had a massive win shortly before his death and left the house to Marsh's father in his will.

Marsh played alongside Ron "Chopper" Harris for Hackney Schools, scoring all three goals as Hackney won the schools national championship. His father secured him a trial for the West Ham United under-16s, and he impressed enough to land himself a place in the academy. However, he was released after 10 months by Wally St Pier, who let Marsh go to open up a place on the youth team for Geoff Hurst. Soon before his 16th birthday, Marsh was spotted by scout Bill Brown, who offered him a place in Fulham's youth programme.

== Playing career ==
=== Fulham ===
Marsh began his career with First Division side Fulham, and made his debut against Aston Villa at Craven Cottage on 23 March 1963 after Johnny Haynes picked up an injury. He scored the winning goal on his debut with a volley from a George Cohen cross, prompting manager Bedford Jezzard to state that "No boy could have had a better first game". Haynes returned to the starting line-up the next week, but Marsh was accommodated with the number eight shirt.

In September 1963, he collided with John Sjoberg whilst scoring a winning goal against Leicester City and was ruled out of action for ten months with a broken jaw and skull. The incident left him with a permanent loss of hearing in his left ear. For weeks he was unable to keep his balance whilst standing, and he was told by one specialist that he would never play football again.

He returned to fitness in the 1964–65 season and was utilized at centre forward, and formed an effective partnership with Haynes to secure 17 goals to become the club's top-scorer. However manager Bedford Jezzard left the club and Marsh did not get along with new boss Vic Buckingham. He ridiculed Buckingham, who in turn froze Marsh out of the first team.

=== Queens Park Rangers ===
Marsh moved across West London to join Queens Park Rangers, then in the Third Division, after manager Alec Stock paid out a £15,000 fee in March 1966. QPR finished third at the end of the 1965–66 campaign, eight points outside promoted Millwall.

His first full season with Rangers was his most successful, as he formed an effective strike partnership with Les Allen, whilst Roger Morgan and Mark Lazarus delivered reliable service from the wings. Marsh scored his first hat-trick for the club in a 4–0 win over Middlesbrough. He scored 44 goals in 53 games as the club became Third Division champions; his 30 league goals made him the division's top-scorer. QPR also won the League Cup, with Marsh setting Rangers on their way with four goals during a 5–0 victory over Colchester United at Layer Road. They needed a replay to overcome Aldershot, before they beat Swansea Town, top-flight Leicester City, Carlisle United and Birmingham City. Their opponents in the Wembley final were West Bromwich Albion, who had won the cup the previous year. The "Baggies" took a two-goal lead before half-time, but Rangers fought back in the second half and on the 75th minute Marsh scored what he described as "the defining goal of my career" when he made a mazy run past numerous defenders before finding the net with a 25-yard shot that went in off the post. Lazarus scored QPR's third goal six minutes later to win the game 3–2. A week after the final Tottenham Hotspur manager witnessed Marsh put in a strong performance against Bournemouth & Boscombe Athletic and he offered to pay QPR £180,000 for Marsh and Morgan, but his offer was rejected by chairman Jim Gregory.

The 1967–68 season saw a second successive promotion as QPR reached the First Division as runners-up in the Second Division, ahead of Blackpool on goal average. Marsh was again top-scorer with 14 goals despite missing the start of the season with a broken foot. He signed a new four-year contract in the summer.

Rangers were unable to compete in the top-flight, and Marsh himself struggled with injury as the club suffered relegation with only 18 points to their name. He broke his foot in pre-season training for the 1968–69 campaign and missed the opening months; during this time the club struggled as Stock resigned before the season started, and he was replaced by Bill Dodgin in a caretaker capacity. By the time Marsh recovered from his injury manager Tommy Docherty's first 28-day spell in charge at Loftus Road had come and gone.

In summer 1969, Marsh was sent off in a friendly against Rangers after punching Kai Johansen in retaliation for a kick Johansen gave Marsh. In the 1969–70 season he and Barry Bridges shared 46 goals equally between them, as QPR finished in ninth position. They also reached the quarter-finals of the FA Cup, which was then the club's joint-best achievement in the competition.

Marsh again hit 23 goals in the 1970–71 campaign, as Rangers again finished in mid-table obscurity under the stewardship of Gordon Jago. However Marsh lost his captaincy to new signing Terry Venables.

He hit 20 goals in the 1971–72 season to finish as the club's top-scorer for the second successive season. Before the season began he signed a new contract on the understanding that he would leave the club if they could not achieve promotion by the end of the season. QPR were still in the hunt for promotion by the time that Marsh was sold – they eventually finished a few points short, however the sum offered by Manchester City was too much for the club to refuse.

=== Manchester City ===
In March 1972, he was signed for Manchester City by Malcolm Allison for a then-club record £200,000. City were four points clear at the top of the table when Marsh was signed, but by the end of the season they had slipped to fourth. Many pundits criticised the signing, pointing out that Marsh was a maverick player ill-suited to Allison's well-drilled set-up. He initially replaced Wyn Davies up front in a 4-4-2 formation, before playing alongside Davies, Mike Summerbee and Francis Lee in a 4-2-4 set-up. They won just three of their final eight games. Marsh wrote in his autobiography Priceless: My Autobiography, “Right, no beating about the bush. I have to hold my hands up – I cost Manchester City the 1972 league championship."

Marsh became City's top-scorer, scoring 19 goals in 1972–73. However the club entered into a decline when Allison resigned in March 1973; over the next year Johnny Hart, Tony Book and Ron Saunders all had spells as City manager. The "Sky Blues" finished 11th in 1972–73 and 14th in 1973–74. They did though reach the final of the League Cup in 1974, losing 2–1 to Wolverhampton Wanderers at Wembley. Marsh was so disappointed by the defeat he threw away his runners-up medal.

Tony Book started his second spell as City's manager in April 1974, and despite being club captain Marsh showed no respect for Book. City finished eighth in 1974–75 and 1975–76. Marsh was transfer-listed and sent to train with the reserves after chairman Peter Swales told Book the details of a private conversation the pair had held:

Marsh gave his own thoughts on this in his autobiography: "Peter Swales had called me into his office. 'Rodney' he said, 'as captain, I want your honest opinion about Tony Book and Ian McFarlane', so I told him. 'If you want my honest opinion, I'll give it. They're both fucking useless'. Just after the meeting, Tony Book called me into his office. 'If you think I'm effing useless' he said 'it's not going to work. Do you want to take it back?' 'No chance' I said. 'In fact, thinking about it more, you're not that good'. And that was the end of my Man City career. I was immediately transfer listed, ordered to train with the kids and injured players, and never pulled on a City shirt again."

=== Later career ===
In the middle of 1975 Marsh played a handful of matches for Cork Hibernians for a fee of £600 a game. He later was flown to Los Angeles as a guest of Elton John, who was then chairman of the Los Angeles Aztecs in the NASL, but before he agreed to join the club he was approached in January 1976 by the Tampa Bay Rowdies. He was sold to the Rowdies in April 1976 for a £40,000 fee. He made two oft-quoted remarks during his transfer, stating that "football in England had become a grey game, played on grey days by grey people" and upon arriving in America he announced that "Pelé is known as the black Rodney Marsh" after the Rowdies owner said that "Rodney Marsh is known as the white Pelé".

He played from 1976 to 1979 in the States, leading the Rowdies to the Soccer Bowl in his final two seasons. Both times they would come up short. Marsh was a NASL All-Star every year, making the first-team in 1976 and 1978, the second team in 1977 and as an Honorable Mention in his final season. Despite this success he suffered from depression and was drinking heavily for much of his time there. Head coach Eddie Firmani resigned from the club in 1977 after becoming frustrated with Marsh's ill-discipline; he was replaced by John Boyle. Marsh stopped his drinking after his doctor told him that alcohol was destroying his liver and seriously shortening his life expectancy. Marsh left the club after being forced out in 1979. He went off in another tantrum after being substituted with ten minutes to go of his competitive career by head coach Gordon Jago. While serving as Rowdies manager for the 1986–87 AISA season, the long-retired Marsh was pressed into service once again as a player, due to a rash of injuries on the squad.

He spent the winter of the 1976–77 season on loan at Fulham, now in the Second Division, after learning that George Best would also be playing at Craven Cottage. The "Cottagers" were then a fashionable club where celebrities would often be in attendance and players like Marsh and Best would spend much of their free time in London nightclubs; manager Alec Stock ensured that the partying off the pitch did not hamper progress on the pitch. Stock resigned and new boss Bobby Campbell took the club as high as fourth place before a run of nine defeats in 12 games saw Fulham slide down the table. The bleak wintery conditions eventually took their toll on Best and Marsh, who both returned to the US early in 1977.

== International career ==
Marsh made his England debut in a 1–1 draw with Switzerland at Wembley in November 1971, coming on as a substitute for Francis Lee. He won a total of nine caps, scoring one goal, which came in a 3–0 victory over Wales.

It has been reported that the England manager Alf Ramsey told him "I'll be watching you for the first 45 minutes and if you don't work harder I'll pull you off at half time," to which Marsh replied: "Crikey, Alf, at QPR all we get is an orange and a cup of tea."

== Style of play ==
Marsh played as a striker and was noted for his technical ability. He was also recognized as an excellent dribbler of the ball, he was capable of producing moments of rare skill and extravagant attempts on goal, which earned him a reputation as a show-boater. His ability and the rarity which he played to his full potential earned him comparisons to George Best. He would regularly retaliate against players who used foul play to stop his runs, and picked up numerous fines from the FA for fighting back against his aggressors.

I would feel more elation if we lost 4–3 in a match which really touched the heights than us sneaking through 1–0 in one of those grey matches. If we cannot remind people what a great game it is then we will have missed a tremendous opportunity."

— Marsh speaking before the 1974 Football League Cup Final.

== Coaching career ==
He retired after 1979, and coached New York United in the ASL. He resigned three months into his contract when the general manager insisted that he sign five Uruguayan refugees to the club against his wishes. In 1981, he was appointed head coach and CEO of the newly created Carolina Lightnin', and quickly assembled a team around star midfielder Don Tobin. He coached the team to the Freedom Conference title in 1981, and they went on to beat his former club New York United 2–1 in the championship final. In 1982 they lost at the semi-final stage to the Oklahoma City Slickers. He then hired Bobby Moore as a coach. At the end of a disappointing 1983 campaign the league folded and Marsh returned to the Tampa Bay Rowdies as head coach in October 1983. There he gave Roy Wegerle his debut as a professional player. After the 1984 season the North American Soccer League also disbanded. The club remained however, and later joined the National Professional Soccer League. Marsh relinquished his coaching duties and remained on as CEO, and appointed Mark Lawrenson and later Malcolm Allison, Ricky Hill, David Hay and Ken Fogarty as head coaches.

== Media career ==
After ending his coaching career, Marsh undertook a three-year roadshow tour with George Best. He began his career in the media with Best, presenting football related videos, before he became a regular feature on television. In 1994, he spent a brief period as CEO of Queens Park Rangers.

Marsh worked as a pundit for Sky Sports for many years. Whilst there he was involved in long-running banter with Bradford City and its supporters in the 1999–2000 season, in which he flippantly dismissed their chances of survival in the Premier League. He offered to shave all of his hair off if the club stayed up, and honoured his bet and had his hair removed in the centre circle of Valley Parade.

He appeared on Soccer Saturday for a total of 11 years until he was sacked in January 2005. He was fired after he joked about the 2004 Asian tsunami during a live broadcast of You're On Sky Sports. He had said: "David Beckham has turned down a move to Newcastle United because of trouble with the 'Toon Army in Asia'." Whilst Marsh subsequently apologised on air, this was not enough to save his job. Subsequently, Marsh joined Talksport as a presenter, co-hosting the daily Drivetime show with Paul Breen-Turner. In 2006, Talksport received a number of complaints and the programme director issued an apology after Marsh made a newsreader laugh uncontrollably whilst she was reporting the death of a British soldier in Afghanistan. Marsh left the station in October 2006.

Since then Marsh attempted to rebuild his career with appearances on reality television. He appeared in the 2007 series of ITV's I'm a Celebrity...Get Me Out of Here! where he was the fifth person to be voted off the show; Celebrity Come Dine with Me on Channel 4 in January 2009, in which he came in joint second place tied with Abi Titmuss; the first series of Celebrity Coach Trip on Channel 4 in November 2010, where he was partnered with Cheryl Baker; other notable appearances include Sing If You Can and Cash in the Attic. He is currently cohost of Grumpy Pundits on Sirius Radio.

== Personal life ==
He married Jean Barry in March 1967. The pair met a few years earlier at a jazz club in Manor Park.

He and his son Jonathan founded the Marsh Group, a property development company in Tampa, Florida, in 1996. After retiring as a player Marsh continued to support QPR and Manchester City. Today he is now a co-host for a radio show called Grumpy Pundits on SiriusXM.

== Honours ==
Queens Park Rangers

- Football League Third Division: 1966–67
- Football League Second Division runner-up: 1967–68
- Football League Cup: 1966–67

Manchester City

- FA Charity Shield: 1972
- Football League Cup runner-up: 1973–74

Tampa Bay Rowdies

- NASL regular season premiership: 1976
- NASL Atlantic Conference Eastern Division: 1976
- NASL Indoor: 1976
- NASL American Conference: 1978, 1979
- Soccer Bowl runner-up: 1978, 1979

Carolina Lightnin'

- American Soccer League: 1981

England

- British Home Championship: 1971–72 (shared)

Individual

- NASL All-Star Selections: 1976 First Team (Best XI), 1977 Second Team, 1978 First Team (Best XI), 1979 Honorable Mention
