= Roger Morgan (footballer) =

English footballer (born 1946)

- Morgan in 2026

Personal information
- Full name: Roger Ernest Morgan
- Date of birth: 14 November 1946 (age 79)
- Place of birth: Walthamstow, London, England
- Position: Winger

Youth career
- Queens Park Rangers

Senior career*
| Years | Team | Apps | (Gls) |
| 1964–1969 | Queens Park Rangers | 180 | (39) |
| 1969–1972 | Tottenham Hotspur | 68 | (8) |
| Total | | 248 | (47) |

International career
| 1970 | England U23 | 1 | (2) |
- * Club domestic league appearances and goals

Roger Ernest Morgan (born 14 November 1946) is an English former footballer who played as a winger in the Football League for Queens Park Rangers and Tottenham Hotspur.

== Career ==
Born in Walthamstow, London, Morgan came through the ranks at Queens Park Rangers to make his debut in a 2–2 draw against Gillingham on 3 October 1964. He scored QPR's first ever goal at Wembley, their first goal in the 1967 Football League Cup Final against West Bromwich Albion, which QPR won 3–2 with further goals from Rodney Marsh and Mark Lazarus to overturn a two-goal deficit.

In total, Morgan played 180 league games for QPR scoring 39 goals before joining Tottenham Hotspur in 1969 for a fee of £110,000. Injury forced his early retirement in 1973.

He spent 18 years at West Ham United as Football in the Community Manager. Roger Morgan coached David Beckham as a youngster.

Morgan's identical twin brother Ian also played for QPR. They adopted different hairstyles in order to tell them apart when playing in the same team.

== Honours ==
Queens Park Rangers

- Football League Cup: 1966–67
