= Mark Lazarus =

English footballer (1938–2025)

Personal information
- Date of birth: 5 December 1938
- Place of birth: Stepney, London, England
- Date of death: 29 July 2025 (aged 86)
- Position: Winger

Youth career
- ????–1958: Barking

Senior career*
Years	Team	Apps	(Gls)
1958–1960	Leyton Orient	20	(4)
1960–1961	Queens Park Rangers	37	(19)
1961–1962	Wolverhampton Wanderers	9	(3)
1962–1964	Queens Park Rangers	81	(28)
1964–1966	Brentford	62	(20)
1966–1967	Queens Park Rangers	88	(29)
1967–1969	Crystal Palace	63	(17)
1969–1972	Leyton Orient	82	(14)
1972–1977	Folkestone	164	(17)
- Ilford
- Wingate & Finchley
Total		606	(151)
- * Club domestic league appearances and goals

Mark Lazarus (5 December 1938 – 29 July 2025) was an English professional footballer.

Lazarus played as a right winger and made more than 400 Football League appearances, scoring over 100 goals. A prominent Jewish player, he initially chose football over boxing and followed manager Alec Stock first to Leyton Orient and then Queens Park Rangers. He transferred to Wolverhampton Wanderers for a club record fee, but due to a clash with manager Stan Cullis, he moved back to QPR after only nine games. He then played for Brentford before signing again for Queens Park Rangers. In his third stint with QPR he scored the winning goal for the club in the 1967 League Cup Final. He moved to Crystal Palace in December 1967. He moved back to Leyton Orient, before moving onto non-league football where he saw out his football career.

== Early life ==
Lazarus, who was Jewish, was born on 5 December 1938 in Stepney, London. He said, of growing up in a Jewish family, "There was no antisemitism in the East End – that came later when we moved to Chadwell Heath, in Essex, when I was six. We were the only Jewish family in the area and I had fights every day on the way to school." Two of his brothers were boxers, one of whom, Lew Lazar, fought for the British title at welterweight and middleweight. He initially followed his brothers into boxing, having fought a few amateur fights. At the request of his father Isaac, he became an apprentice upholsterer to ensure that he had a trade once any potential sporting career ended.

He was also a schoolboy player for both Fulham and Chelsea. He also played football for his school and district sides, and played in the same Saturday team as Jimmy Greaves. In 1953 when he was 15 years old he joined Wingate Football Club, which was all Jewish.

== Career ==
Lazarus began his career with Barking, before becoming a professional in 1958 with Leyton Orient. He was spotted by Orient manager Alec Stock, who two years later took Lazarus from Orient to Queens Park Rangers after the manager had moved clubs first.

After playing for QPR, he was transferred to Wolverhampton Wanderers for a club record fee of £27,500, but only went on to play nine games for the club. He did not get on with Wolves manager Stan Cullis and the two suffered from a clash of personalities. The transfer made Lazarus become the first "big name" Jewish footballer. He transferred back to QPR, and then onto Brentford a couple of seasons later for £8,000 plus George McLeod.

He moved back to QPR once more, who were in the Football League Third Division. Lazarus was involved in the cup run the team went on in the League Cup. In the fifth round, he set up both the QPR goals as they defeated Carlisle United 2–1. He scored the third goal against Birmingham City in the first leg of the semi-final, which was also the first time QPR had won in an away match in the League Cup. The two legged semi-final win took them to the final of the 1967 League Cup where they faced cup holders West Bromwich Albion. Having gone two goals down by half time, the QPR team staged a comeback during the second half. With nine minutes of the game remaining, Ron Hunt collided with the WBA goalkeeper, knocking the ball loose. Lazarus latched onto the loose ball and slammed it into the back of an empty net, his team winning the match and trophy 3–2. A£15,000 offer was placed by Reading for the player's services, but he decided not to move clubs. He spent a further year at QPR before being transferred to Crystal Palace for £10,000 in December 1967. Like Rangers, Palace were aiming for promotion at the time and manager Bert Head convinced Lazarus to move clubs. Lazarus made 39 appearances in season 1968–69, in which Palace achieved promotion to the top flight for the first time. His three spells at QPR set a record at the time for occasions a player had transferred back to the same side. After he moved back to Orient for a fee of £8,000, in October 1969 the club were promoted out of Division Three as winners during the 1969–70 season. Lazarus was fined £75 in January 1971 for receiving five yellow cards whilst playing for Orient over a 12-month period. He finished his career in non-league football, with Folkestone, Ilford and Wingate & Finchley.

== Later life ==
After his footballer career was over, he became a minder for snooker players, including Steve Davis at the time of his loss to Dennis Taylor in the 1985 World Snooker Championship final. As of 2007, he ran a haulage firm in Romford.

Lazarus was named in a list of the top 100 Queens Park Rangers players of all time, constructed by the club's historian in 2007.

== Personal life and death ==
Lazarus married his wife Fay in 1959, and had two children and five grandchildren. His nephew is former Leyton Orient footballer Bobby Fisher.

Lazarus died on 29 July 2025, at the age of 86. He had been in hospital with a serious illness.

== Honours ==
Queens Park Rangers

- Football League Third Division: 1966–67
- Football League Cup: 1966–67

Crystal Palace

- Football League Second Division runner-up: 1968–69

Leyton Orient

- Football League Third Division: 1969–70

== See also ==
- List of select Jewish football (association; soccer) players
