= Tony Hazell =

English footballer

Personal information
- Date of birth: 19 September 1947 (age 79)
- Place of birth: High Wycombe, England
- Height: 5 ft 10 in (1.78 m)
- Position: Defender

Youth career
- 1962–1964: Queens Park Rangers

Senior career*
Years	Team	Apps	(Gls)
1964–1974	Queens Park Rangers	369	(4)
1974–1978	Millwall	153	(6)
1978–1979	Crystal Palace	5	(0)
1979–1981	Charlton Athletic	37	(0)
Total		564	(10)
- * Club domestic league appearances and goals

Tony Hazell (born 19 September 1947 in High Wycombe) is an English former footballer who made 564 appearances in the Football League playing as a defender for Queens Park Rangers, Millwall, Crystal Palace and Charlton Athletic.

== Career ==
Hazell joined Queens Park Rangers as a 15-year-old, and made his professional debut in October 1964 against Gillingham. He was a member of the 1966–67 side that won both the Third Division Championship and the League Cup, defeating West Bromwich Albion 3–2 at Wembley Stadium.

Hazell played 369 League games for QPR before transferring to Millwall in 1974, where he played 153 League games. He later had a short spell at Crystal Palace and a little longer with Charlton Athletic before retiring.

== Post-retirement ==
Following his retirement from football, Hazell worked as a technician for British Telecom.

== Honours ==
Queens Park Rangers

- Football League Cup: 1966–67
