= Jim Gregory (football chairman) =

English football club director and chairman

James Arthur "Jimmy Boy" Gregory (born Hammersmith, London 19 January 1928 – 26 September 1998), was an English football club director and chairman.

He grew up in the Shepherd's Bush district of West London and was a fervent Fulham F. C. supporter as a child. His father ran a fish stall on North End Road, Fulham, and in 1942 at the age of 14 when his father went into the army he took over the running of the stall. When Gregory senior came back from the War, Jim set up his own buying and selling business. In the early 1950s he entered the second-hand car business, setting up on a Hammersmith bombsite. By the end of the 1950s he had bought 3 acres (12,000 m^{2}) in Hounslow and set up "Gregory's Motordome" (which could possibly be seen as a forerunner of the car supermarkets of today). Further businesses were acquired and sold. Gregory attempted to buy into his boyhood idols Fulham but his offer was rejected by Fulham chairman Tommy Trinder; he would later try again only to meet with the same answer. Gregory was deeply upset by this rejection and in late 1964 he joined the board of Fulham’s local rivals Queens Park Rangers (QPR) instead.

He became chairman a few months later in March 1965. When he took over at Loftus Road, the South Africa Road side of the ground consisted of a muddy bank and crowds were low. Gregory's enthusiasm and money – he would invest millions - soon however brought a great run of success. The manager at the time, Alec Stock, was building a young and dynamic team and one of Gregory's early deals in conjunction with Stock helped to add the final piece in the jigsaw: The signing from Fulham of Rodney Marsh for £15,000 in March 1966.

Over the coming seasons QPR would achieve three promotions, reaching the First Division for the first time in their history, and also win the League Cup in 1967. Gregory also modernised the stadium, financing the building initially of two new stands on the South Africa Road (built in 1968) and Ellerslie Road (completed in 1972) sides of the ground. During his ownership of the club, QPR won a total of four promotions, reached an FA Cup final, finished as league runners-up in 1976 and fifth in 1984, qualified for the UEFA Cup twice and fielded a host of international players. He also appointed a number of leading managers of the 1970s and 1980s including Dave Sexton, Tommy Docherty, Terry Venables and Jim Smith.

In 1987, after advice from doctors to slow down, he sold QPR to Marler Estates, a property company run by the then Fulham Chairman David Bulstrode.

However, after leaving QPR in 1987, he became Chairman at Portsmouth in 1988, remaining until 1995 when ill-health forced him to step down and hand over the reins to his son, Martin. Martin resigned in December 1998.

He died in September 1998 at the age of 70.

While at Fratton Park, he appointed Jim Smith as manager in 1991, with Portsmouth reaching the FA Cup semi finals in 1992 and almost winning promotion to the FA Premier League in 1993. He also oversaw the conversion of Fratton Park into an all-seater stadium, as well as the purchase of several of Portsmouth’s key players of the 1990s, including strikers Guy Whittingham and Paul Walsh along with midfielder Alan McLoughlin.
