= Mick Leach =

English footballer (1947–1992)

Personal information
- Full name: Michael John Christopher Leach
- Date of birth: 16 January 1947
- Place of birth: Hackney, England
- Date of death: 11 January 1992 (aged 44)
- Position: Midfielder

Senior career*
| Years | Team | Apps | (Gls) |
| 1964–1978 | Queens Park Rangers | 313 | (61) |
| 1978 | Detroit Express | 23 | (3) |
| 1978–1979 | Cambridge United | 19 | (1) |
- * Club domestic league appearances and goals

Michael Leach (16 January 1947 – 11 January 1992) was a footballer with Queens Park Rangers in the 1960s and 1970s.

He made over 300 Football League appearances for QPR. His first league appearance for them was in 1964–65, and his final league game with QPR was in 1977–78. His final appearance was in a 3rd round F.A. Cup tie versus Wealdstone on 7 January 1978, played at Loftus Road.

In 1978, he moved to the USA to play in the North American Soccer League with the Detroit Express, making 23 appearances for them.

He died from cancer in 1992.
