= Les Allen =

English footballer and manager

Personal information
- Full name: Leslie William Allen
- Date of birth: 4 September 1937 (age 89)
- Place of birth: Dagenham, Essex, England
- Height: 5 ft 10 in (1.78 m)
- Position: Inside forward

Senior career*
Years	Team	Apps	(Gls)
1954–1959	Chelsea	44	(11)
1959–1965	Tottenham Hotspur	119	(47)
1965–1969	Queens Park Rangers	128	(55)
Total		291	(113)

International career
1961	England U23	1	(0)

Managerial career
- 1969–1970: Queens Park Rangers
- 1971: Aris
- 1972–1974: Swindon Town
- * Club domestic league appearances and goals

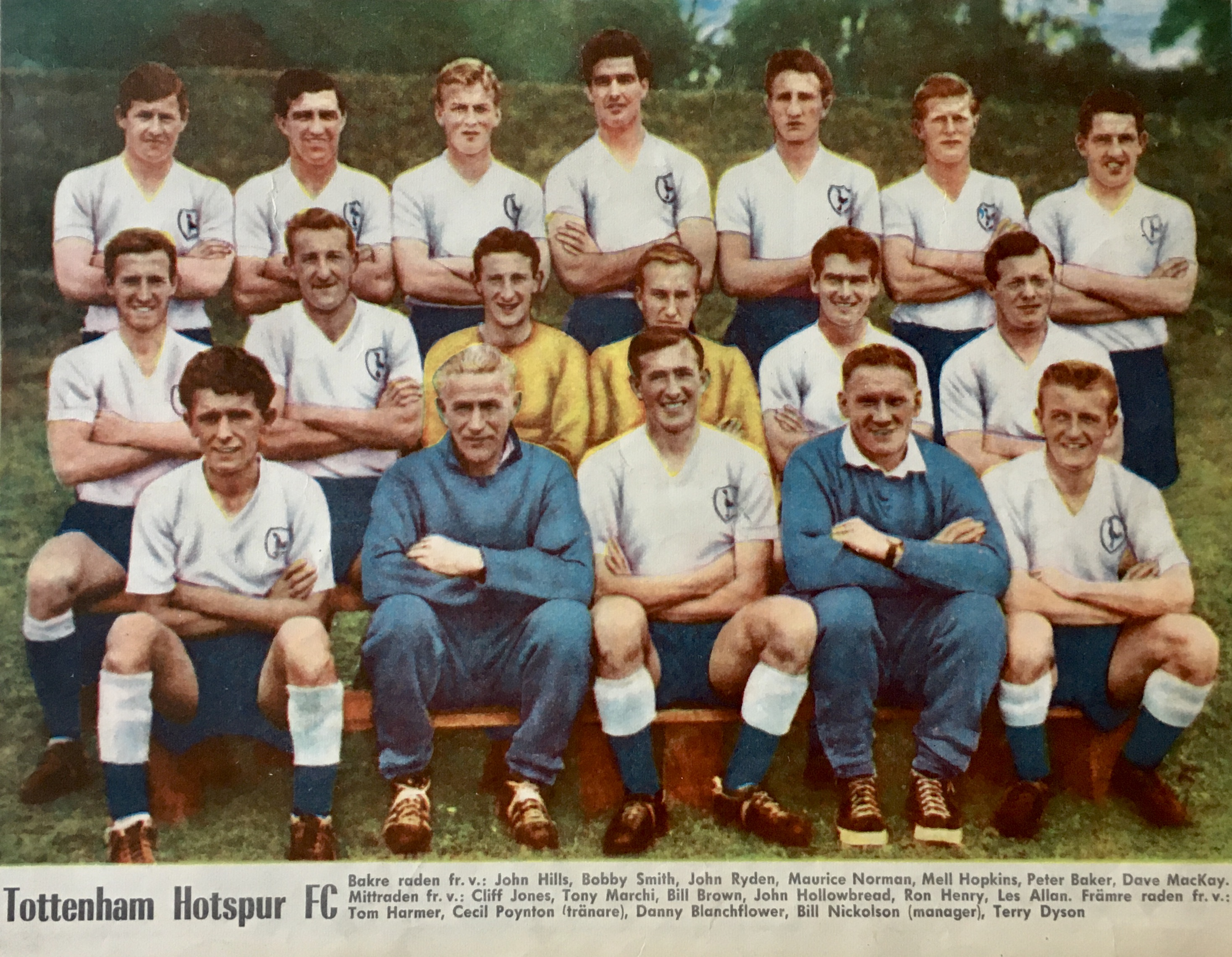
Tottenham Hotspur in 1960 with Danny Blanchflower (captain) and both goalkeepers, Bill Brown and John Hollowbread, in the team with Cecil Poynton as trainer and Bill Nicholson as manager. Les Allen sitting far right in the middle row.

Leslie William Allen (born 4 September 1937) is an English former football player and manager who played as an inside forward.

== Playing career ==
Allen started his playing career at amateur club Briggs Sports where he helped them to reach the semi-finals of the Amateur Cup in 1954. In the same year Allen signed for Chelsea on his 17th birthday in September 1954 but never established his place in the Chelsea first-team. He scored 12 League goals for Chelsea in 44 appearances.

=== Tottenham Hotspur ===
Allen joined Tottenham Hotspur in December 1959 as part exchange for Johnny Brooks. He scored twice in his debut game for Spurs against Newcastle, and five against Crewe Alexandra in the 1959–60 FA Cup tie a few weeks later that ended 13–2, which is the highest scoring FA Cup tie of the 20th century, and the club's record win.

Allen was a key member of Tottenham's double winning side of 1960–61, forming a lethal goalscoring partnership with Bobby Smith. He scored 23 goals in the league that season, and four in the cups. In all, he scored 47 goals in 119 league appearances for the club, and 61 goals in all appearances (134). but struggled to retain his place following the arrival of Jimmy Greaves, and had to compete with Bobby Smith for the centre-forward spot.

Allen earned an England call-up in February 1961 where he earned one cap for England Under 23s against Wales.

=== Queens Park Rangers ===
Allen joined Queens Park Rangers in July 1965 for a recorded sum of £21,000. Allen scored 55 goals in 123 starts and five substitute appearances. He was a member of the QPR team who became the first Third Division side to win the Football League Cup Final 1967.

== Managerial career ==
Allen briefly managed QPR during the 1969–70 season. In November 1972 he became manager of Swindon Town, remaining in charge until 1974.

== Family ==
His brother Dennis, sons Clive and Bradley and nephews Paul and Martin were also professional footballers.

== Honours ==
Tottenham Hotspur

- Football League First Division: 1960–61
- FA Cup: 1960–61

Queens Park Rangers

- Football League Third Division: 1966–67
- Football League Cup: 1966–67
