= Frank Sibley (footballer) =

English footballer (1947–2024)

Personal information
- Full name: Frank Phillip Sibley
- Date of birth: 4 December 1947
- Place of birth: Uxbridge, England
- Date of death: 10 May 2024 (aged 76)
- Position: Defender

Youth career
- Queens Park Rangers

Senior career*
Years	Team	Apps	(Gls)
1963–1971	Queens Park Rangers	143	(3)

Managerial career
- 1977–1978: Queens Park Rangers
- 1979: Walsall
- 1984–1985: Queens Park Rangers (caretaker manager)
- * Club domestic league appearances and goals

Frank Phillip Sibley (4 December 1947 – 10 May 2024) was an English footballer and manager.

== Career ==
=== Playing career ===
A defender, Sibley was the youngest player to play in the QPR first team at the age of 15 on 3 September 1963 away to Aldershot in a League Cup tie. He was a member of the QPR double winning side that captured both the Third Division Championship in 1966–67 and the League Cup on 4 March 1967. He retired from playing early, at the age of 23, after suffering a knee injury.

=== Coaching career ===
He joined the coaching staff at QPR, and later became manager in the summer of 1977 at the age of 29, the youngest ever QPR manager.

He was appointed as manager of Walsall in February 1979 replacing Alan Ashman 1979. He remained in charge for only two months before being replaced by Alan Buckley, who was returning to Walsall having been player–manager at Birmingham City.

Sibley was chief scout for Watford.

== Post-retirement and death ==
Sibley was diagnosed with Parkinson's disease in 2004. He died on 10 May 2024, at the age of 76.

== Honours ==
Queens Park Rangers

- Football League Cup: 1966–67
