= Mike Keen =

English footballer (1940–2009)

Personal information
- Full name: Michael Thomas Keen
- Date of birth: 19 March 1940
- Place of birth: High Wycombe, England
- Date of death: 12 April 2009 (aged 69)
- Place of death: Flackwell Heath, England
- Height: 6 ft 1 in (1.85 m)
- Position: Midfielder

Senior career*
Years	Team	Apps	(Gls)
1959–1969	Queens Park Rangers	393	(39)
1969–1972	Luton Town	144	(11)
1972–1975	Watford	126	(5)
Total		663	(56)

Managerial career
- 1973–1977: Watford
- 1978–1979: Northampton Town
- 1980–1984: Wycombe Wanderers
- 1985–1989: Marlow
- * Club domestic league appearances and goals

Michael Thomas Keen (19 March 1940 – 12 April 2009) was an English footballer who played during the 1960s and 1970s. He was the father of former West Ham United and Stoke City player Kevin Keen.

== Career ==
=== Playing career ===
Keen started his career at Queens Park Rangers, making his debut in 1959 against York City. He went on to play 393 league games and scored 39 goals for the club.

Keen was the captain of the QPR side that won the League Cup and Third Division title in 1966–67. He captained the FA tour of Australia in 1971. He scored six goals as they won all nine of their games, two against Australia and seven against state sides. He played for Luton Town from 1969 to 1972 until he was transferred to Watford.

=== Coaching career ===
He was appointed player-manager of Watford in 1973. He was sacked in 1977 shortly before a home game with Huddersfield Town, but was on the touchline during the game, which Watford won 2–0 despite having two players sent off.

He later moved into full-time management with Northampton Town, between 1978 and 1979, followed by his hometown club, Wycombe Wanderers, between January 1980 and 1984, leading them to the semi-final of the FA Trophy in 1981–82, then to the Isthmian League title in 1982–83. He went on to manage Marlow.

== Post-retirement ==
Keen ran two sports shops in High Wycombe. In the mid-1970s he owned "Keen and Busbys" jointly with Viv and Martyn Busby. The shop was located on Oxford Road in High Wycombe. In the early 1980s his shop "Mike Keen Sports" opened in the Octagon Shopping Centre. Mike supplied a great many local youth football teams with their playing kit throughout the 1980s and 1990s.

Mike died after a short illness, aged 69, on 12 April 2009.

== Honours ==
Queens Park Rangers

- Football League Cup: 1966–67
