= 1953–54 Queens Park Rangers F.C. season =

English football club season

Queens Park Rangers
1953–54 season
- Chairman: Albert Hittinger
- Manager: Jack Taylor
- Stadium: Loftus Road
- Football League Third Division South: 18th
- FA Cup: Third Round
- London Challenge Cup: Round One
- Top goalscorer: League: Conway Smith 12; All: Conway Smith 12
- Highest home attendance: 16,649 v Brighton (19 August 1953)
- Lowest home attendance: 5,224 v Coventry City (30 January 1954)
- Biggest win: 5–1 v Torquay (6 March 1954); Newport County (20 April 1954)
- Biggest defeat: 0–5 v Colchester United (25 December 1953)
Home colours	Away colours	Third colours

The 1953-54 Queens Park Rangers season was the club's 63rd season of existence and their 2nd back in the Football League Third Division following their relegation in the 1951–52 season.QPR finished 18th in their league campaign, and were eliminated in the third round of the FA Cup.

A benefit game for Ex QPR Goalkeeper Reg Allen took place between QPR and Manchester United on 29 March 1954, raising in the region of £1,800 for his recovery fund.

On 5 October 1953 floodlights were used at Loftus Road for the first time for a friendly game against Arsenal. to increase visibility under the floodlights a silk-style white shirt was worn at home during the season

A shirt badge was adopted for the first time with the Hammersmith Borough Coat of Arms utilised as its Crest. “Queen’s Park Rangers” was substituted for the Borough motto.

== League standings ==
Pos	Team	Pld	W	D	L	GF	GA	GAv	Pts
16	Southend United	46	18	7	21	69	71	0.972	43
17	Aldershot	46	17	9	20	74	86	0.860	43
18	Queens Park Rangers	46	16	10	20	60	68	0.882	42
19	Bournemouth & Boscombe Athletic	46	16	8	22	67	70	0.957	40
20	Swindon Town	46	15	10	21	67	70	0.957	40

Source: rsssf.com

== Results ==
QPR scores given first

Win Draw Loss

=== Third Division South ===
Date	Opponent	H / A	Result F–A	Scorers	Attendance	Position
19 August 1953	Brighton	H	1–2	Shepherd	16649	13
22 August 1953	Bristol City	A	2–1	Petchey, Cameron	20819	14
26 August 1953	Norwich City	A	2–2	Clayton, Hawkins	23432	12
29 August 1953	Aldershot	H	0–2		12146	16
31 August 1953	Norwich City	H	0–2		11742	17
5 September 1953	Swindon	A	1–0	Cameron	15157	17
7 September 1953	Southampton	H	0–1		11308	18
12 September 1953	Walsall	H	2–0	Petchey, Hawkins	12273	13
16 September 1953	Southampton	A	1–3	Hawkins	16246	18
19 September 1953	Shrewsbury	A	1–1	Smith	10153	20
21 September 1953	Crystal Palace	H	1–1	Shepherd	7485	15
26 September 1953	Exeter City	H	0–0		13041	15
30 September 1953	Crystal Palace	A	3–0	Smith 2, Shepherd	9409	15
3 October 1953	Newport	A	1–2	Hurrell	6817	17
10 October 1953	Northampton	H	1–1	Shepherd	13207	16
17 October 1953	Torquay	A	2–2	Smith	8328	16
24 October 1953	Watford	H	0–4		15560	20
31-Oct-53	Brighton and Hove Albion	A	PP			
7 November 1953	Southend	H	1–0	Tomkys	9975	19
14 November 1953	Reading	A	1–3	Shepherd	14866	20
28 November 1953	Millwall	A	0–4		17497	20
5 December 1953	Ipswich Town	H	3–1	Petchey, Woods, Shepherd	13815	19
12-Dec-53	Bournemouth and Boscombe Athletic	A	pp			
19 December 1953	Bristol City	H	0–1		8126	18
25 December 1953	Colchester United	A	0–5		6155	20
26 December 1953	Colchester United	H	0–0		10715	21
2 January 1954	Aldershot	A	4–1	Petchey 3, Cameron	5497	18
9-Jan-54	Coventry City	A	pp			
16 January 1954	Swindon Town	H	0–2		9122	20
23 January 1954	Walsall	A	0–2		8734	21
30 January 1954	Coventry City	H	0–3		5224	22
6 February 1954	Shrewsbury Town	H	0–0		7851	22
13 February 1954	Exeter City	A	0–0		8133	22
27 February 1954	Northampton	A	1–2	Clark	8259	21
6 March 1954	Torquay	H	5–1	Clark, Smith 2 (1 pen), Kerrins, Cameron	11233	21
13-Mar-54	Orient	a	pp			
18 March 1954	Orient	A	2–2	Clark, Angell	5114	21
20 March 1954	Millwall	H	4–0	Kerrins, Clark, Pounder, Smith	13503	21
27 March 1954	Southend	A	1–4	Angell	7110	20
3 April 1954	Reading	H	2–0	Smith, Tomkys	9942	22
7 April 1954	Bournemouth & Boscombe Ath.	A	1–0	Clark	5721	21
10 April 1954	Ipswich Town	A	1–2	Cameron	15380	21
12 April 1954	Coventry City	A	1–3	Clark	4785	21
16 April 1954	Gillingham	A	0–1		10679	21
17 April 1954	Bournemouth & Boscombe Ath.	H	2–1	ShepherdSmith	10007	22
19 April 1954	Gillingham	H	3–1	Smith, Kerrins, Lewin (og)	9576	22
20 April 1954	Newport	H	5–1	Cameron (3), Kerrins, Smith	10533	21
24 April 1954	Watford	A	2–0	Angell, Cameron	12431	19
26 April 1954	Orient	H	2–1	Cameron, Aldous (og)	9412	16
30 April 1954	Brighton & Hove Albion	A	1–3	Pounder	10493	18

=== FA Cup ===
Date	Round	Opponents	H / A	Result F–A	Scorers	Attendance
21 November 1953	First Round	Shrewsbury (Third Division South)	H	2-0	Hurrell 2	13076
12 December 1953	Second Round	Nuneaton Borough (Birmingham League)	H	1–1	Tomkys	18316
17 December 1953	Second Round Replay	Nuneaton Borough (Birmingham League)	A	2–1	Petchey, Shepherd	13083
9 January 1954	Third Round	Port Vale (Third Division North)	H	0–1		17474

=== London Challenge Cup ===
Date	Round	Opponents	H / A	Result F–A	Scorers	Attendance
8 October 1953	First Round	West Ham United	H	1–2		

=== Friendly ===
Date	Match	Opponents	H / A	Result F–A	Scorers	Attendance
12-Aug-53	Reds v Blues	h	Practice Match			
5 October 1953	Arsenal	H	First Floodlit Match	1–3	Quinn	16028
14-Oct-53	Fenerbache	h	Friendly			
19-Oct-53	Brentford	h	Friendly			
31-Oct-53	Brighton and Hove Albion	A	Friendly			
2-Nov-53	West Ham United	h	Friendly			
20-Jan-54	Gravesend & Nothfleet	A	Friendly			
1-Mar-54	Hereford United	A	Friendly			
8-Mar-54	Chelsea	h	Floodlight Friendly			
15-Mar-54	Amsterdam FC	h	Floodlight Friendly			
22-Mar-54	Charlton Athletic	h	Floodlight Friendly			
29 March 1954	Manchester United	H	Reg Allen Benefit Match	1–4	Bent og.	15529
5-Apr-54	Middlesex Wanderers	h	Floodlight Friendly			

== Squad ==
Position	Nationality	Name	League Appearances	League Goals	F..A.Cup Appearances	F.A.Cup Goals	Total Appearances	Total Goals
GK	(England)	Harry Brown	33		4		37	
GK	(Scotland)	Stan Gullan	13				13	
DF	(England)	Tony Ingham	41		4		45	
DF	(England)	Bill Spence	5				5	
DF	(England)	Jim Taylor	41		3		44	
DF	(England)	John Poppitt	14		1		15	
DF	(England)	Pat Woods	23	1	3		26	1
MF	(England)	Pat Kerrins	13	4			13	4
MF	(England)	Peter Angell	31	3	4		35	3
MF	(Scotland)	Bobby Cameron	38	10	4		42	10
MF	(England)	George Petchey	21	6	4	1	25	7
MF	(England)	Lew Clayton	28	1	1		29	1
MF	(Wales)	Brian Nicholas	30		4		30	
MF	(Republic of Ireland)	Peter Fallon	1				1	
MF	(England)	Mike Powell	21				21	
FW	(England)	Geoff Taylor	2				2	
FW	(England)	Conway Smith	29	12			29	12
FW	(Scotland)	Ian Allen	1				1	
FW	(Scotland)	Willie Hurrell	6	1	3	2	9	3
FW	(England)	Gordon Quinn	10		1		11	
FW	(England)	George Mountford	10				10	
FW	(England)	Charlie Barley	4				4	
FW	(England)	Ernie Shepherd	34	7	4	1	38	8
FW	(England)	Mike Tomkys	20				20	
FW	(Scotland)	Willie Clark	18	6			18	6
FW	(England)	Albert Pounder	11	2			11	2
FW	(England)	Bert Hawkins	8	3			8	3

== Transfers in ==
Name	from	Date	Fee
Willie Hurrell	Millwall	July 1, 1953	
Jim Taylor	Fulham	July 1953	
Willie Hurrell	Millwall	July 1953	
Edward Barlow	Stoke	July 1953	
Peter Angell	Slough Town	July 6, 1953	
George Petchey	West Ham	July 17, 1953	Free
Peter Fallon	Exeter City	August 1953	
Peter McLeod *		September 1953	
Peter van Geersdaele		November 1953	
Ian Allen	Beith Jnrs	November 1953	
Geoff Taylor	SC Bruhl (Swi)	November 12, 1953	
Terry Craddock *	Baldock Town	December ?1953	
Pat Kerrins	Queens Park Rangers youth	December 21, 1953	
Cyril (Ticker) May		January 1954	
Willie Clark	Arbroath	February 1, 1954	
Albert Pounder	Charlton	February 12, 1954	£500
Arthur Longbottom	Methley U	March 3, 1954	
Tom Fidler	Hounslow	May 1954	

== Transfers out ==
Name	from	Date	Fee	Date	Club	Fee
Derek Parsons	Ashford Town	February 1950		July 1953	Ashford Town	
Billy Waugh	Luton Town	July 1950	£6,000	July 1953	Bournemouth & Boscombe Athletic	£****
Oscar Hold	Everton	February 1952		July 1953	March Town (Pl./Man.)	
Reg Chapman	Royal Air Force	August 27, 1940		July 1953	Ashford Town	
Bill Heath	I C juniors	February 1942		July 1953	Dover	
George Powell	Fulham	December 1946		July 1953	Tunbridge Wells	
Jim Harrison	Willesden Town	February 1952		July 1953		
Billy Hill	Uxbridge Town	April 1951		July? 1953	Ramsgate	
Peter McLeod *		September 1953		October 1953	Hereford U	
George Mountford	Stoke	October 1952	Exch.	October 1953	Hereford U	
Ron Higgins	Brighton	January 1953	Exch.	January? 1954	Sittingbourne	
