= 1952–53 Queens Park Rangers F.C. season =

English football club season

Queens Park Rangers
1952–53 season
- Chairman: Albert Hittinger
- Manager: Jack Taylor
- Stadium: Loftus Road
- Football League Third Division South: 18th
- FA Cup: Third Round
- London Challenge Cup: Round One
- Top goalscorer: League: Conway Smith 12; All: Conway Smith 15
- Highest home attendance: 23,125 v Watford (25 Aug 1952)
- Lowest home attendance: 7,206 v Shrewsbury (20 Apr 1953)
- Biggest win: 3–0 v Shrewsbury (2 Oct 1952)
- Biggest defeat: 0–5 v Colchester United (25 December 1953)
Home colours	Away colours

The 1951-52 Queens Park Rangers season was the club's 62nd season of existence and their first back in the Football League Third Division, following their relegation the season before. QPR finished 18th in their league campaign, and were eliminated in the third round of the FA Cup. Jack Taylor replaced Dave Mangnall as manager after relegation from Division Two the previous season.

== League standings ==
Pos	Team	Pld	W	D	L	GF	GA	GAv	Pts
18	Swindon Town	46	14	12	20	64	79	0.810	40
19	Aldershot	46	12	15	19	61	77	0.792	39
20	Queens Park Rangers	46	12	15	19	61	82	0.744	39
21	Gillingham	46	12	15	19	55	74	0.743	39
22	Colchester United	46	12	14	20	59	76	0.776	38

== Results ==
QPR scores given first

Win Draw Loss

=== Third Division South ===
Date	Opponent	H / A	Result F–A	Scorers	Attendance	Position
23 Aug 1952	Exeter	Away	2–2	C. Smith (2)	14897	12
25 Aug 1952	Watford	Home	2–2	G. Stewart, C. Smith	23125	7
30 Aug 1952	Coventry City	Home	0–4		14335	19
4 Sept 1952	Watford	Away	1–1	E. Shepherd	22875	18
6 Sept 1952	Norwich City	Away	0–2		26449	21
8 Sept 1952	Walsall	Home	4–2	M. Tomkys (2), H. Gilberg, C. Smith	9362	15
13 Sept 1952	Colchester	Home	1–0	B. Muir	13925	14
18 Sept 1952	Walsall	Away	1–1	B. Cameron	7026	13
20 Sept 1952	Aldershot	Away	1–4	E. Shepherd	8316	15
25 Sept 1952	Leyton Orient	Away	0–5		8754	19
27 Sept 1952	Swindon	Home	1–1	A. Addinall	10762	20
2 Oct 1952	Shrewsbury	Away	3–0	E. Shepherd (2), C. Smith	5988	16
4 Oct 1952	Southend	Home	3–2	C. Smith (2), A. Addinall	14777	15
11 Oct 1952	Brighton	Away	0–2		18987	16
18 Oct 1952	Newport	Home	4–2	E. Shepherd (2), G. Quinn, A. Addinall	14902	15
25 Oct 1952	Crystal Palace	Away	2–4	A. Addinall, Ingham	19181	15
1 Nov 1952	Bristol City	Home	2–1	Mountford, A. Addinall	14718	15
8 Nov 1952	Torquay	Away	1–1	D. Parsons	6638	15
15 Nov 1952	Northampton	Home	2–2	E. Shepherd, H. Gilberg	14661	14
29 Nov 1952	Ipswich Town	Home	2–2	A. Addinall (2)	9983	13
6-Dec-52	Reading	A	PP			
13 Dec 1952	AFC Bournemouth	Home	2–1	B.Nicholas (pen), B. Cameron	8015	12
20 Dec 1952	Exeter	Home	1–1	L. Clayton	6310	10
26 Dec 1952	Bristol Rovers	Home	0–1		13592	11
27 Dec 1952	Bristol Rovers	Away	1–2	H. Gilberg	30995	12
3 Jan 1953	Coventry City	Away	0–2		15097	15
10 Jan 1953	Gillingham	Away	0–3		11907	15
17 Jan 1953	Norwich City	Home	3–1	M. Tomkys, B. Waugh (2)	13084	12
24 Jan 1953	Colchester	Away	1–1	J. Harrison (og)	7959	13
31 Jan 1953	Gillingham	Home	1–1	M. Tomkys	10565	13
7 Feb 1953	Aldershot	Home	2–2	C. Smith, B. Waugh	10713	14
14 Feb 1953	Swindon	Away	3–1	C. Hatton (2), C. Smith	7387	12
21 Feb 1953	Southend	Away	0–2		9252	13
28 Feb 1953	Brighton	Home	3–3	R. Higgins, C. Hatton, Jennings (og)	15238	12
7 Mar 1953	Newport	Away	0–2		7971	15
14 Mar 1953	Crystal Palace	Home	1–1	B. Cameron	12972	14
21 Mar 1953	Bristol City	Away	4–4	C. Smith (2), B. Cameron, Mountford	20052	15
28 Mar 1953	Torquay	Home	0–1		8059	16
3 Apr 1953	Millwall	Away	1–2	C. Smith	23962	17
4 Apr 1953	Northampton	Away	2–4	M. Tomkys, B. Cameron	12546	21
6 Apr 1953	Millwall	Home	1–3	E. Shepherd	12607	21
11 Apr 1953	Leyton Orient	Home	0–1		11018	23
18 Apr 1953	Ipswich Town	Away	1–0	C. Hatton	8662	21
20 Apr 1953	Shrewsbury	Home	1–0	E. Shepherd	7206	19
25 Apr 1953	Reading	Home	1–0	J. Harrison	10433	20
29 Apr 1953	Reading	Away	0–2		6367	21
2 May 1953	AFC Bournemouth	Away	0–1		8276	20

=== FA Cup ===
Date	Round	Opponents	H / A	Result F–A	Scorers	Attendance
22 November 1952	First Round	Shrewsbury (Third Division South)	H	2–2	Cameron 2	11475
27 November 1952	First Round Replay	Shrewsbury (Third Division South)	A	2–2	Addinall, Smith	5000
2 December 1952	First Round Second Replay	Shrewsbury (Third Division South)	Villa Park	1–4	Smith	3799

=== London Challenge Cup ===
Date	Round	Opponents	H / A	Result F–A	Scorers	Attendance
6 October 1952	First Round	Charlton	H	1–1		
13 October 1952	First Round Replay	Charlton	A	0–4		

=== Friendlies ===
Date	Opponents		
16-Aug-52	Blues v Reds	H	Practice Match
2-Feb-53	Gloucester	A	Friendly
9-Feb-53	Headington United	A	Friendly
13-Apr-53	Ernie Adams XI	h	Ernie Adams Testimonial
27-Apr-53	La Gantoise	h	Friendly

== Squad ==
Position	Nationality	Name	League Appearances	League Goals	F..A.Cup Appearances	F.A.Cup Goals	Total Appearances	Total Goals
GK	(England)	Harry Brown	43		3		46	
GK	(Scotland)	Stan Gullan	3				3	
DF	(England)	Tony Ingham	43	1	3		46	1
DF	(England)	Des Farrow	8				8	
DF	(England)	Bill Spence	31		3		34	
DF	(England)	Bill Heath	1				1	
DF	(England)	George Powell	14				14	
DF	(England)	John Poppitt	34		3		37	
DF	(England)	Pat Woods	1				1	
MF	(England)	Gerry Crickson	2				2	
MF	(Scotland)	Bobby Cameron	35	5	3	2	38	7
MF	(England)	Lew Clayton	24	1	1		25	1
MF	(England)	Reg Chapman	12				12	
MF	(England)	Derek Parsons	2	1	1		3	1
MF	(Wales)	Brian Nicholas	32	1	2		34	1
MF	(England)	Mike Powell	18				18	
FW	(England)	Jim Harrison	6	1			6	1
FW	(England)	Conway Smith	25	12	2	3	27	15
FW	(Scotland)	George Stewart	2	1			2	1
FW	(England)	Gordon Quinn	3	1			3	1
FW	(England)	George Mountford	25	2	3		28	2
FW	(England)	Ernie Shepherd	43	9	3		46	9
FW	(England)	Mike Tomkys	20	5			20	5
FW	(England)	Bert Addinall	19	7	3	1	22	8
FW	(Scotland)	Billy Waugh	15	2			15	2
FW	(England)	Cyril Hatton	10	4			10	4
FW	(England)	Harry Gilberg	26	3	3		29	3
FW	(England)	Ron Higgins	3	1			3	1
FW	(England)	Oscar Hold	1				1	
FW	(Scotland)	Billy Muir	5	1			5	1

== Transfers in ==
Name	from	Date	Fee
Tony Jordan		July ?1952	
Bob Scrivens	Merthyr Tydfil	July ?1952	
Derek Williams		July ?1952	
Alastair Irwin	Glentyan Thistle	July ?1952	
Gordon Quinn	Eastcote BC	August 22, 1952	
Ian Allen	Beith Athletic	September 1952	
David Hazelton *		September 1952	
Alan Silver	Maidenhead U	September 30, 1952	
Matt Andrew *	Workington	October 1952	
John Moore	Colchester	October 1952	
George Mountford	Stoke City	October 1952	Des Farrow
Jobey Dean	Thoresby Colliery	November 27, 1952	
Ron Higgins	Brighton	January 1953	Harry Gilberg & Bert Addinall
Ron Springett	Victoria United	February 19, 1953	
Jim Taylor	Fulham	April 1953	
Charlie Barley	Arsenal	May 1953	
Derek Barley	Arsenal	May 1953	
Peter Angell	Charlton	June 1953	
Bert Hawkins	West Ham United	June 1953	

== Transfers out ==
Name	from	Date	Fee	Date	Club	Fee
Johnny McKay	Irvine Meadow	February 1949		July 1952	Yeovil	Free
Tony Richardson	Slough Sports Club	April 1951		July 1952		
William Hill	Uxbridge Town	April 1951		July 1952	Ramsgate	
Ernie Adams	Fulham	August 1947		July 1952	Betteshanger Colliery	
Johnny McKay	Irvine Meadow	May 1949		July 1952	Yeovil Town	
Billy Muir	Irvine Meadow	February 11, 1948		October 1952	Torquay	
Des Farrow	Leicester	August 28, 1944		October 1952	Stoke	£4,000
Matt Andrew *	Workington	October 1952		November 1952		Free
John Moore	Colchester	October 1952		November 1952	Staines Town	Free
Harry Gilberg	Tottenham Hotspur	16 August 1951	£1,000	January 1953	Brighton and Hove Albion	Ron Higgins & £****
Bert Addinall	British Oxygen	April 1945		January 1953	Brighton and Hove Albion	Ron Higgins & £****
George Stewart	Brentford	March 1948	£4,000	January 1953	Shrewsbury	
Harry Gilberg	Tottenham	August 14, 1951	£2,000	January 1953	Brighton	
Tony Richardson	Slough	April 1951		March? 1953		
Cyril Hatton	Notts County	April 9, 1946	£1,000	June 1953	Chesterfield	
Bob Scrivens	Merthyr Tydfil	July ?1952		June 1953		
David Hazelton *		September 1952		June 1953		
Jim Harrison	Willesden Town	February 1952		June 1953		

== See also ==
- List of Queens Park Rangers F.C. seasons
- List of Queens Park Rangers F.C. records and statistics
- English Football League
- Football in England
