= 1954–55 Queens Park Rangers F.C. season =

English football club season

Queens Park Rangers
1954–55 season
- Chairman: Albert Hittinger
- Manager: Jack Taylor
- Stadium: Loftus Road
- Football League Third Division South: 15th
- Football Combination Division 2: 15
- FA Cup: First Round
- Football Combination Cup Section 1: 7th
- London Challenge Cup: Round one
- Top goalscorer: League: Conway Smith 17; All: Conway Smith 18
- Highest home attendance: 16,899 v Southampton (9 October 1954)
- Lowest home attendance: 6,461 v Shrewsbury Town (2 April 1955)
- Biggest win: 5–0 v Aldershot (7 September 1954)
- Biggest defeat: 1–5 v Coventry City (2 May 1955)
Home colours	Away colours	Third colours

The 1954-55 Queens Park Rangers season was the club's 64th season of existence and their 3rd back in the Football League Third Division following their relegation in the 1951–52 season. QPR finished 15th in their league campaign, and were eliminated in the first round of the FA Cup.

QPR lost to amateur club Walthamstow Avenue after two replays in the first round of the F.A. Cup

== League standings ==
Pos	Team	Pld	W	D	L	GF	GA	GAv	Pts
13	Northampton Town	46	19	8	19	73	81	0.901	46
14	Aldershot	46	16	13	17	75	71	1.056	45
15	Queens Park Rangers	46	15	14	17	69	75	0.920	44
16	Shrewsbury Town	46	16	10	20	70	78	0.897	42
17	Bournemouth & Boscombe Athletic	46	12	18	16	57	65	0.877	42

Source: rsssf.com

== Results ==
QPR scores given first

Win Draw Loss

=== Third Division South ===
Date	Opponent	H / A	Result F–A	Scorers	Attendance	Position
21 August 1954	Watford	H	2–1	Cameron, Clark	19686	3
24 August 1954	Southend United	A	2–2	Cameron, Smith	8505	3
28 August 1954	Bournemouth & Boscombe Ath.	H	2–2	Smith 2	13665	7
30 August 1954	Southend United	H	1–1	Shepherd	11894	4
4 September 1954	Brentford	A	1–1	Smith	18756	7
7 September 1954	Aldershot	H	5–0	Fidler 2, Smith 2 (2 pens), Petchey	11045	3
11 September 1954	Newport County	H	2–0	Shepherd, Rutter	13188	3
15 September 1954	Aldershot	A	0–2		5169	5
18 September 1954	Exeter City	A	1–2	Cameron	8911	10
22 September 1954	Swindon	A	0–2		6423	12
25 September 1954	Colchester United	H	4–1	Pounder, Clark, Cameron, Elder (og)	11926	9
27 September 1954	Swindon	H	3–1	Smith 2 (1 pen), Pounder	8241	4
2 October 1954	Norwich City	A	1–1	Smith	20353	7
9 October 1954	Southampton	H	2–2	Smith, Wilkins (og)	16899	6
14 October 1954	Millwall	A	1–0	Clark	21062	5
23 October 1954	Orient	H	2–0	Smith, Clark	22114	5
30 October 1954	Brighton & Hove Albion	A	1–4	Shepherd	14825	6
6 November 1954	Reading	H	2–3	Shepherd, Smith	13399	8
13 November 1954	Shrewsbury Town	A	0–1		7372	7
27 November 1954	Bristol City	A	1–1	Tomkys	17657	7
4 December 1954	Torquay	H	4–2	Smith 2 (1 pen), Cameron 2	8339	7
11 December 1954	Gillingham	A	PP			
18 December 1954	Watford	A	1–1	Cameron	11427	8
25 December 1954	Northampton Town	H	1–0	Clark	8718	6
26 December 1954	Northampton Town	A	3–1	Angell, Clark 2	12623	5
1 January 1955	Bournemouth & Boscombe Ath.	H	1–1	Angell	9031	8
8 January 1955	Coventry City	A	PP			
15 January 1955	Brentford	H	1–1	Clark	9835	8
22 January 1955	Newport County	A	0–4		5457	8
29 January 1955	Coventry City	H	3–2	Smith (pen), Cameron, Kerrins	12523	7
5 February 1955	Exeter City	H	1–2	Smith	9626	7
12 February 1955	Colchester United	A	0–1		4903	8
19 February 1955	Norwich City	H	2–1	Angell, Cameron	6530	8
26 February 1955	Southampton	A	2–2	Clark, Shepherd	12396	7
5 March 1955	Millwall	H	1–2	Shepherd	12036	7
12 March 1955	Orient	A	0–3		17513	9
19 March 1955	Brighton & Hove Albion	H	3–2	Clark 2, Shepherd	9191	9
26 March 1955	Reading	A	1–3	Kerrins	6066	9
2 April 1955	Shrewsbury Town	H	2–0	Clark, Cameron	6461	8
8 April 1955	Crystal Palace	A	1–2	Clark	17238	8
9 April 1955	Walsall	A	1–4	Smith	13018	11
11 April 1955	Crystal Palace	A	1–0	Clark	8974	9
16 April 1955	Bristol City	H	1–1	Shepherd (pen)	12498	9
20 April 1955	Gillingham	A	1–3	Pounder	9528	10
23 April 1955	Torquay	A	2–3	Longbottom, Cameron	6146	14
25 April 1955	Walsall	A	1–1	Cameron	6523	11
30 April 1955	Gillingham	H	1–1	Cameron	9104	13
2 May 1955	Coventry City	A	1–5	Clark	7381	15

=== London Challenge Cup ===
Date	Round	Opponents	H / A	Result F–A	Scorers	Attendance
4 October 1954	First Round	Fulham	A	1–2		

=== FA Cup ===
Date	Round	Opponents	H / A	Result F–A	Scorers	Attendance
20 November 1954	First Round	Walthamstow Avenue (Isthmian League)	H	2–2	Fidler, Smith	16299
23 November 1954	First Round Replay	Walthamstow Avenue (Isthmian League)	A	2–2	Fidler, Tomkys	10500
29 November 1954	First Round Second Replay	Walthamstow Avenue (Isthmian League)	* Highbury	0–4		11939

=== Friendlies ===
14-Aug-54	Possibles v Probables	H	Trial Match	
11-Oct-54	Tottenham Hotspur	h	Floodlight Friendly	
18-Oct-54	Stoke City	h	Floodlight Friendly	
25-Oct-54	Hull City	h	Floodlight Friendly	
8-Jan-55	Headlington United	a	Friendly	
3-Feb-55	Lask Linz	h	Floodlight Friendly	
16-Feb-55	1st Simmering Sportklub	h	Floodlight Friendly	
2-Mar-55	Columbia, Vienna	h	Floodlight Friendly	
7-Mar-55	Middlesex Wanderers	h	Floodlight Friendly	
21-Mar-55	Brentford	a	Floodlight Friendly	
28-Mar-55	Fulham	h	Floodlight Friendly	Postponed
4-Apr-55	All Stars XI	h	Player Benefit Match	
5-May-55	Weymouth	A	Friendly	

== Squad ==
Position	Nationality	Name	League Appearances	League Goals	F..A.Cup Appearances	F.A.Cup Goals	Total Appearances	Total Goals
GK	(England)	Harry Brown	39		2		41	
GK	(Scotland)	Stan Gullan	6				6	
GK	(England)	Alan Silver			1		1	
DF	(England)	Tony Ingham	38		3		41	
DF	(England)	Keith Rutter	32	1			32	1
DF	(England)	Pat Woods	32		3		35	
MF	(England)	Pat Kerrins	15	2	1		16	2
MF	(England)	Peter Angell	41	3	3		44	3
MF	(Scotland)	Bobby Cameron	44	13	3		47	13
MF	(England)	George Petchey	17	1	2		19	1
MF	(Wales)	Brian Nicholas	39		1		40	
MF	(Northern Ireland)	Mike Powell	36		3		39	
FW	(England)	Conway Smith	33	17	3	1	36	18
FW	(England)	Arthur Longbottom	11	1			11	1
FW	(Northern Ireland)	Gordon Quinn						
FW	(England)	Ernie Shepherd	40	8	2		42	8
FW	(England)	Mike Tomkys	8	1	2	2	10	3
FW	(Scotland)	Willie Clark	39	15	1		40	15
FW	(England)	Albert Pounder	23	3	1		24	3
FW	(England)	Tom Fidler	12	2	2	1	14	3

== Transfers in ==
Name	from	Date	Fee
Keith Rutter	Methley United	July 1, 1954	
Cyril Partridge		August 1954	
Bill Harrison		October ?1954	
Josef Kaiml *		December 1954	
Albert Rhodes	Worksop Town	December 15, 1954	
Bill Temby	Dover	February 1955	
Hugh Rainey	Portsmouth	June 1955	

== Transfers out ==
Name	from	Date	Fee	Date	Club	Fee
Alastair Irwin	Glentyan Thistle	July ?1952		June? 1954		
John Poppitt	Derby County	Sep 6,1950		July 1954	Chelmsford City	
Jim Taylor	Fulham	April 1953		July 1954	Tunbridge Wells (Pl./Man.)	
Peter Fallon	Exeter City	August 1953		July 1954	Retired (Inj.)	
Geoff Taylor	SC Brühl	November 12, 1953		July 1954	VfR 07 Kirn	
Ian Allen	Beith Jnrs	September 1952		July 1954	Bournemouth	Free
Willie Hurrell	Millwall	July 1, 1953		July 1954	Tunbridge Wells United	
Charlie Barley	Arsenal	May 1953		July 1954	Aldershot	
Bert Hawkins	West Ham United	July 1953		July 1954	Cheltenham Town	
Bill Spence	Portsmouth	December 1951	£8,000	July 1954	Retired	
Edward Barlow	Stoke	July 1953		July 1954	Cheltenham Town	
Peter van Geersdaele		November 1953		Aug? 1954	Holbeach	
Terry Craddock *	Baldock Town	December ?1953		Oct? 1954		
Josef Kaiml *		December 1954		Feb? 1955		
Lew Clayton	Barnsley	August 15, 1950	£3,000	May 1955	Bournemouth	
Bill Harrison		October ?1954		June? 1955		
Cyril Partridge		August 1954		June? 1955	Bedford Town	
George Powell	Fulham	November 1946		June 1955	Snowdon Colliery	
Cyril (Ticker) May		January 1954		June? 1955	Ramsgate	Free
