= List of Queens Park Rangers F.C. players =

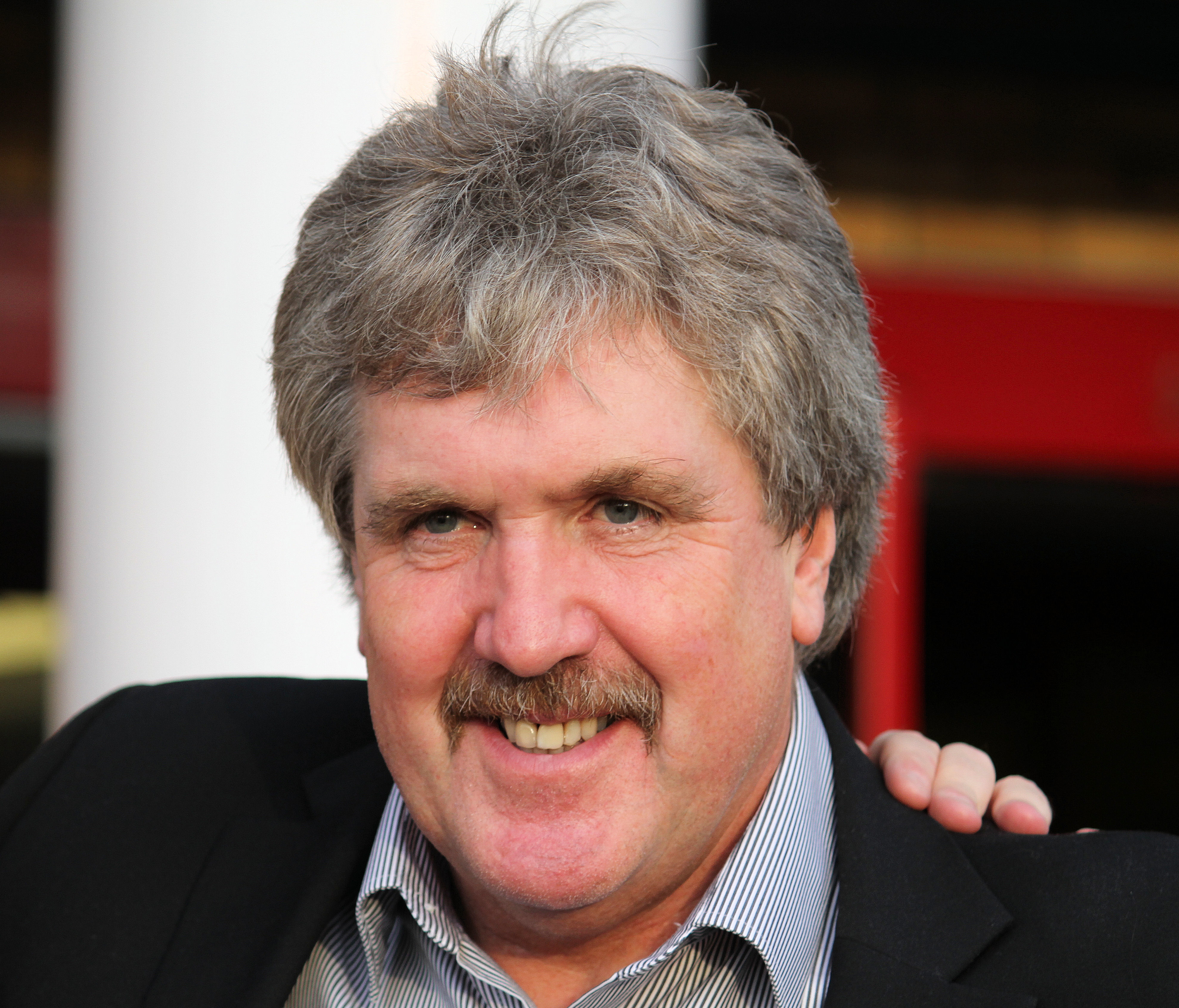
Phil Parkes, photographed in 2010, played for QPR more than any other goalkeeper, a total of 406 matches.

The following article is about players who have appeared for Queens Park Rangers Football Club. Since playing their first competitive match as a professional club, more than 1,100 players have made a competitive first-team appearance for the club, of whom 180 players have made at least 100 appearances (including substitute appearances); those players are listed here.

The vast majority of the players who have played a hundred times or more for QPR are from England, with 35 players either coming from or played internationally for other countries. Seventeen of those foreign players come from one of the other Home Nations of the UK, seven players come from elsewhere in Europe, two from South America, two from Africa, five from the Caribbean islands, and two from North America. There are no players in the list from either Asia or Australasia.

Queens Park Rangers' record appearance-maker is Tony Ingham, who made 555 appearances in his QPR career between 1950 and 1963. Nine other players have made more than 400 appearances, the most recent being Kevin Gallen, who has made the ninth-highest number of appearances with 414 matches, scoring 104 goals in the process. George Goddard is the club's top goalscorer with 186 goals in his seven years with the club. Other than Goddard and Gallen, only Brian Bedford, Rodney Marsh and Don Givens have scored more than 100 goals for the club. As of 11 August 2017, 180 players have appeared 100 times or more for QPR, 34 have played 250 or more and 10 players 400 or more games.

== Key ==
Appearances and goals are for first-team competitive matches only, including Premier League, Football League, FA Cup, League Cup, Football League Third Division South Cup, FA Charity/Community Shield, UEFA Cup, Southern League, Southern Professional Charity Cup, Western League, London Challenge Cup, Southern Floodlight Cup, Full Members Cup, Mercantile Credit Centenary Trophy and Football League Trophy matches. As the team's historian, Gordon Macey, lists the statistics from wartime matches such as the two London Combination leagues, the Wartime League and the Football League War Cup as well as the abandoned 1939–40 season; they are included even though they are normally considered unofficial.

Key

- **Name** – The name of the player, sorted by last name.
- **Nationality** – If a player played international football, the country he played for is shown. Otherwise, the player's nationality is given as their country of birth.
- **QPR career** – The year of the player's first appearance for Queens Park Rangers to the year of his last appearance.
- **Starts** – The number of games started.
- **Subs** – The number of games played as a substitute. Substitutions were only introduced to the Football League in the 1960s.
- **Total** – The total number of games played, both as a starter and as a substitute.
- **Goals** – The number of goals scored by the player in both games started and substitute appearances.

Positions are listed according to the tactical formations that were employed at the time. Thus the change in the names of defense and midfield reflects the tactical evolution that occurred from the 1960s onwards.
Players still active for Queens Park Rangers are in bold.
Statistics are correct as of the end of the 2023–24 season.

Positions key
| Pre-1960s | | 1960– | |
|---|---|---|---|
| GK | Goalkeeper | | |
| FB | Full back | DF | Defender |
| HB | Half back | MF | Midfielder |
| FW | Forward | | |

== Players ==
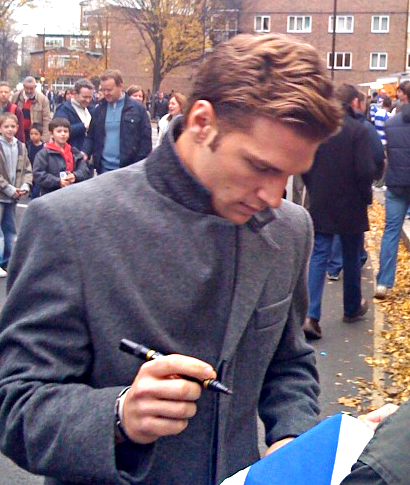
Ákos Buzsáky is the only Hungarian player to have played for more than a hundred games for QPR

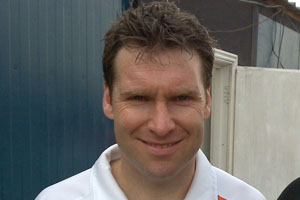
Kevin Gallen played in more games for QPR than any other striker, 414 games over two periods with the club

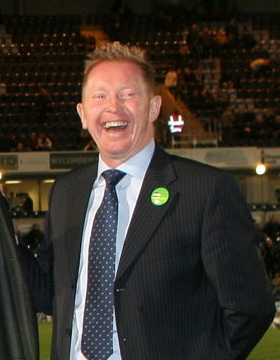
Gary Waddock played 240 games for QPR as a midfielder

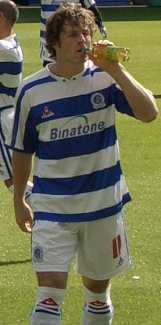
Gareth Ainsworth played for QPR for seven years, in over 150 matches

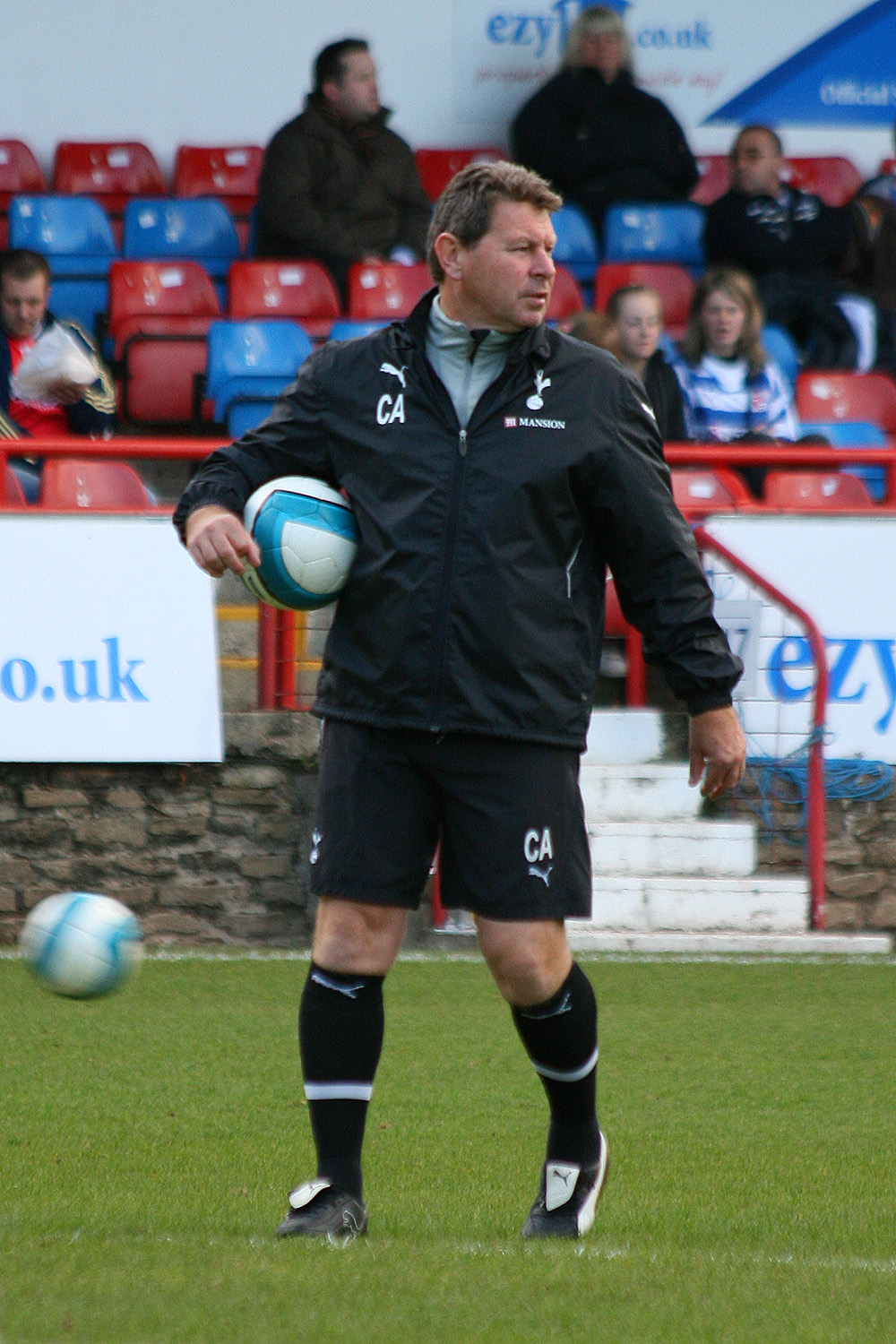
Clive Allen, photographed in 2008, scored 83 goals in 157 games over his two periods spent with the club

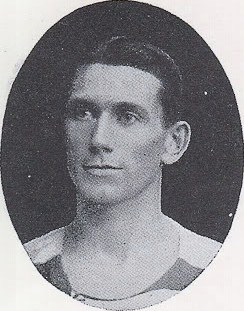
Billy Barnes played 234 games for QPR, scoring 37 goals

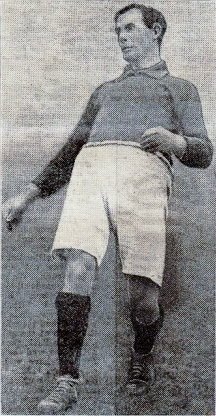
James Birch played for QPR over the course of fourteen years, making 363 appearances

List of Queens Park Rangers F.C. players with at least 100 appearances
| Name | Nationality | Position | QPR career | Starts | Subs | Total | Goals | Ref(s) |
| Name | Nationality | Position | QPR career | Appearances | | | Goals | Ref(s) |
|---|---|---|---|---|---|---|---|---|
| Bert Addinall | England | FW | 1944–1953 | 172 | 0 | 172 | 73 | |
| Albert Adomah | Ghana | MF | 2020–2024 | 49 | 81 | 130 | 6 | |
| Gareth Ainsworth | England | MF | 2003–2010 | 109 | 43 | 152 | 21 | |
| Clive Allen | England | FW | 1978–1980; 1981–1984 | 147 | 10 | 157 | 83 | |
| Les Allen | England | FW | 1964–1969 | 146 | 5 | 151 | 62 | |
| Martin Allen | England | MF | 1984–1989 | 154 | 12 | 166 | 19 | |
| Reg Allen | England | GK | 1938–1950 | 255 | 0 | 255 | 0 | |
| Peter Angell | England | FB | 1953–1965 | 457 | 0 | 457 | 40 | |
| Jimmy Armstrong | England | HB | 1928–1934 | 133 | 0 | 133 | 5 | |
| Charlie Austin | England | FW | 2013–2016; 2021; 2021–2022 | 119 | 29 | 148 | 63 | |
| John Baldock | England | HB | 1913–1920 | 143 | 0 | 143 | 13 | |
| Gary Bannister | England | FW | 1981–1988 | 172 | 0 | 172 | 72 | |
| Ian Baraclough | England | FB | 1998–2001 | 133 | 5 | 138 | 1 | |
| Yoann Barbet | France | DF | 2019–2022 | 121 | 0 | 121 | 4 | |
| David Bardsley | England | DF | 1989–1998 | 294 | 1 | 296 | 6 | |
| Simon Barker | England | MF | 1988–1998 | 349 | 27 | 376 | 41 | |
| Billy Barnes | England | FW | 1907–1913 | 234 | 0 | 234 | 37 | |
| Walter Barrie | England | FB | 1932–1938 | 174 | 0 | 174 | 1 | |
| Brian Bedford | Wales | FW | 1959–1965 | 284 | 0 | 284 | 180 | |
| Jake Bidwell | England | DF | 2016–2019 | 129 | 1 | 130 | 4 | |
| Marcus Bignot | England | DF | 2001–2002; 2004–2008 | 182 | 11 | 193 | 2 | |
| James Birch | England | FW | 1912–1926 | 363 | 0 | 363 | 13 | |
| Marc Bircham | Canada | MF | 2002–2007 | 151 | 16 | 178 | 7 | |
| Jack Blackman | England | FW | 1932–1935 | 120 | 0 | 120 | 71 | |
| Dexter Blackstock | Antigua and Barbuda | FW | 2006–2009 | 96 | 21 | 117 | 32 | |
| Wilf Bott | England | FW | 1936–1938 | 110 | 0 | 110 | 45 | |
| Stan Bowles | England | HB | 1972–1979 | 315 | 0 | 315 | 96 | |
| John Bowman | England | HB | 1901–1905 | 110 | 0 | 110 | 2 | |
| Rufus Brevett | England | DF | 1991–1998 | 158 | 12 | 170 | 1 | |
| Harry Brown | England | GK | 1941–1946; 1951–1956 | 286 | 0 | 286 | 0 | |
| Jackie Burns | England | HB | 1928–1931 | 125 | 0 | 125 | 36 | |
| Martyn Busby | England | DF | 1970–1976; 1977–1981 | 145 | 22 | 167 | 20 | |
| Ákos Buzsáky | Hungary | MF | 2007–2012 | 87 | 38 | 125 | 24 | |
| John Byrne | Republic of Ireland | FW | 1984–1988 | 128 | 21 | 149 | 36 | |
| Bobby Cameron | Scotland | FW | 1950–1959 | 278 | 0 | 278 | 62 | |
| Clarke Carlisle | England | DF | 2000–2004 | 109 | 3 | 112 | 6 | |
| Ilias Chair | Morocco | MF | 2017– | 238 | 42 | 280 | 38 | |
| Reg Chapman | England | HB | 1945–1947 | 108 | 0 | 108 | 4 | |
| Tommy Cheetham | England | FW | 1935–1939 | 135 | 0 | 135 | 93 | |
| Dave Clement | England | DF | 1965–1979 | 472 | 4 | 476 | 28 | |
| Harry Collins | England | GK | 1900–1905 | 121 | 0 | 121 | 0 | |
| John Collins | England | FW | 1959–1966 | 193 | 0 | 193 | 56 | |
| Matthew Connolly | England | DF | 2008–2012 | 113 | 12 | 125 | 2 | |
| Lee Cook | England | MF | 2002–2007; 2008–2012 | 170 | 26 | 196 | 13 | |
| Steve Cook | Poland | MF | 2023–2026 | 92 | 8 | 100 | 5 | |
| William Coward | England | FW | 1928–1932 | 138 | 0 | 138 | 28 | |
| Joel Cunningham | England | GK | 1926–1932 | 174 | 0 | 174 | 0 | |
| George Dale | England | FW | 1915–1919 | 110 | 0 | 110 | 40 | |
| Ian Dawes | England | DF | 1980–1988 | 270 | 0 | 229 | 4 | |
| Chris Day | England | GK | 2001–2005 | 100 | 0 | 100 | 0 | |
| Rob Dickie | England | DF | 2020–2023 | 123 | 6 | 129 | 8 | |
| Seny Dieng | Senegal | GK | 2020–2023 | 121 | 0 | 121 | 1 | |
| David Donald | England | FW | 1914–1921 | 119 | 0 | 119 | 12 | |
| Samuel Downing | England | HB | 1903–1909 | 170 | 0 | 170 | 13 | |
| William Draper | England | FB | 1915–1919 | 101 | 0 | 101 | 0 | |
| Ray Drinkwater | England | GK | 1958–1963 | 216 | 0 | 216 | 0 | |
| Jimmy Dunne | Republic of Ireland | DF | 2021– | 194 | 9 | 203 | 14 | |
| Lyndon Dykes | Scotland | FW | 2020–2024 | 136 | 29 | 165 | 36 | |
| Hogan Ephraim | England | MF | 2007–2014 | 76 | 41 | 117 | 8 | |
| Eberechi Eze | England | MF | 2017–2020 | 94 | 18 | 112 | 20 | |
| Mark Falco | England | MF | 1987–1991 | 81 | 25 | 106 | 33 | |
| Alec Farmer | England | HB | 1934–1943 | 178 | 0 | 178 | 11 | |
| Des Farrow | England | HB | 1944–1952 | 158 | 0 | 158 | 7 | |
| Alejandro Faurlín | Argentina | MF | 2009–2016 | 152 | 11 | 163 | 5 | |
| Terry Fenwick | England | DF | 1980–1987 | 307 | 1 | 308 | 45 | |
| Les Ferdinand | England | FW | 1987–1995 | 169 | 14 | 183 | 90 | |
| Wayne Fereday | England | MF | 1980–1989 | 206 | 36 | 242 | 25 | |
| Joe Fidler | England | FB | 1906–1913 | 192 | 0 | 192 | 0 | |
| Mike Fillery | England | MF | 1983–1987 | 114 | 3 | 147 | 10 | |
| Alfred Fitzgerald | England | FW | 1936–1941 | 124 | 0 | 124 | 57 | |
| Sam Field | England | MF | 2021; 2021-2026 | 169 | 29 | 198 | 12 | |
| Terrell Forbes | England | DF | 2001–2004 | 128 | 2 | 130 | 0 | |
| George Fox | England | HB | 1915–1920 | 101 | 0 | 128 | 15 | |
| Gerry Francis | England | MF | 1969–1979; 1980–1982 | 347 | 5 | 352 | 65 | |
| Luke Freeman | England | MF | 2017–2019 | 105 | 7 | 112 | 15 | |
| Paul Furlong | England | FW | 2000; 2002; 2002–2007 | 149 | 34 | 183 | 58 | |
| Kevin Gallen | England | FW | 1992–2000; 2001–2007 | 348 | 66 | 414 | 104 | |
| Ian Gillard | England | DF | 1968–1982 | 479 | 5 | 484 | 11 | |
| Don Givens | Republic of Ireland | FW | 1972–1978 | 293 | 1 | 294 | 101 | |
| George Goddard | England | FW | 1926–1933 | 260 | 0 | 260 | 186 | |
| Ted Goodier | England | HB | 1931–1935 | 155 | 0 | 155 | 2 | |
| Kaspars Gorkšs | Latvia | DF | 2008–2011 | 121 | 3 | 124 | 6 | |
| Robert Green | England | GK | 2012–2016 | 126 | 2 | 128 | 0 | |
| John Gregory | England | FW | 1912–1923 | 241 | 0 | 241 | 59 | |
| John Gregory | England | MF | 1981–1986 | 188 | 2 | 190 | 43 | |
| Grant Hall | England | DF | 2015–2020 | 119 | 11 | 130 | 6 | |
| Lee Harper | England | GK | 1997–2001 | 129 | 2 | 131 | 0 | |
| Cyril Hatton | England | FW | 1942–1953 | 206 | 0 | 206 | 93 | |
| Bob Hazell | England | DF | 1979–1983 | 117 | 7 | 124 | 9 | |
| Tony Hazell | England | DF | 1964–1974 | 407 | 8 | 415 | 5 | |
| Bill Heath | England | FW | 1942–1953 | 124 | 0 | 124 | 14 | |
| Karl Henry | England | MF | 2013–2017 | 97 | 21 | 118 | 2 | |
| Clint Hill | England | DF | 2010–2016 | 178 | 7 | 185 | 5 | |
| Len Hill | England | GK | 1920–1925 | 176 | 0 | 176 | 0 | |
| Alfred Hitch | England | HB | 1899–1901; 1902–1906 | 183 | 0 | 183 | 20 | |
| Junior Hoilett | Canada | MF | 2012–2016 | 80 | 42 | 122 | 12 | |
| John Hollins | England | MF | 1975–1979 | 177 | 6 | 183 | 7 | |
| Ian Holloway | England | MF | 1991–1996 | 150 | 20 | 170 | 5 | |
| Ernie Howe | England | FB | 1977–1982 | 106 | 0 | 106 | 6 | |
| Peter Hucker | England | GK | 1977–1987 | 188 | 0 | 188 | 0 | |
| Ron Hunt | England | DF | 1964–1973 | 249 | 6 | 255 | 1 | |
| Andrew Impey | England | DF | 1990–1997 | 199 | 16 | 215 | 18 | |
| Tony Ingham | England | FB | 1950–1963 | 555 | 0 | 555 | 3 | |
| Arthur Jefferson | England | FB | 1936–1950 | 368 | 0 | 368 | 1 | |
| Reg John | England | FB | 1920–1926 | 145 | 0 | 145 | 1 | |
| Osman Kakay | Sierra Leone | DF | 2016–2024 | 81 | 32 | 113 | 2 | |
| Mike Keen | England | HB | 1959–1969 | 440 | 0 | 440 | 45 | |
| Pat Kerrins | England | HB | 1953–1960 | 158 | 0 | 158 | 31 | |
| Jim Langley | England | DF | 1965–1967 | 104 | 1 | 105 | 11 | |
| Richard Langley | Jamaica | MF | 1996–2003; 2005–2006 | 161 | 21 | 182 | 24 | |
| Mark Lazarus | England | MF | 1960–1961; 1962–1964; 1965–1967 | 233 | 2 | 235 | 84 | |
| Mick Leach | England | MF | 1964–1978 | 337 | 24 | 361 | 70 | |
| Stuart Leary | England | FW | 1962–1966 | 104 | 0 | 104 | 32 | |
| Mikele Leigertwood | Antigua and Barbuda | MF | 2007–2011 | 117 | 24 | 141 | 12 | |
| Arthur Longbottom | England | FW | 1954–1961 | 218 | 0 | 218 | 68 | |
| Harry Lowe | Scotland | FW | 1935–1939 | 250 | 0 | 250 | 51 | |
| Massimo Luongo | Australia | MF | 2015–2019 | 144 | 8 | 152 | 10 | |
| Jamie Mackie | Scotland | FW | 2010–2013; 2015–2018 | 110 | 40 | 150 | 24 | |
| Danny Maddix | Jamaica | DF | 1987–2001 | 307 | 40 | 347 | 18 | |
| Richard March | England | FB | 1932–1942 | 311 | 0 | 311 | 6 | |
| Ben Marsden | England | FB | 1920–1925 | 132 | 0 | 132 | 6 | |
| Rodney Marsh | England | FW | 1966–1972 | 211 | 0 | 211 | 106 | |
| Bill Mason | England | GK | 1934–1942 | 269 | 0 | 269 | 0 | |
| Don Masson | Scotland | MF | 1974–1978 | 144 | 0 | 144 | 24 | |
| Alan McDonald | Northern Ireland | DF | 1981–1997 | 476 | 7 | 483 | 18 | |
| John McDonald | Scotland | FB | 1907–1913 | 198 | 0 | 198 | 0 | |
| Frank McLintock | Scotland | MF | 1973–1977 | 162 | 1 | 163 | 6 | |
| Gary Micklewhite | England | MF | 1979–1983 | 115 | 12 | 127 | 17 | |
| Archie Mitchell | England | HB | 1907–1921 | 467 | 0 | 467 | 25 | |
| Ian Morgan | England | FW | 1964–1973 | 175 | 15 | 190 | 28 | |
| Roger Morgan | England | MF | 1964–1969 | 206 | 0 | 206 | 44 | |
| Steve Morrow | Northern Ireland | FB | 1997–2001 | 93 | 7 | 100 | 2 | |
| Paul Murray | England | MF | 1996–2001 | 132 | 25 | 157 | 8 | |
| Andy Neil | England | HB | 1927–1930 | 112 | 0 | 112 | 0 | |
| Warren Neill | England | FB | 1980–1988 | 209 | 6 | 215 | 7 | |
| George Newlands | Scotland | FB | 1900–1907 | 186 | 0 | 186 | 0 | |
| Brian Nicholas | Wales | FB | 1949–1955 | 122 | 0 | 122 | 2 | |
| Nedum Onuoha | England | DF | 2012–2018 | 210 | 14 | 224 | 8 | |
| Bright Osayi-Samuel | Nigeria | MF | 2017–2021 | 78 | 37 | 115 | 13 | |
| Gilbert Ovens | England | FB | 1911–1915 | 112 | 0 | 112 | 4 | |
| Gino Padula | Argentina | MF | 2002–2005 | 91 | 12 | 103 | 5 | |
| Steve Palmer | England | DF | 2001–2004 | 130 | 13 | 143 | 10 | |
| Paul Parker | England | DF | 1987–1991 | 156 | 4 | 160 | 1 | |
| Phil Parkes | England | GK | 1970–1979 | 406 | 0 | 406 | 0 | |
| Johnny Pattison | Scotland | FW | 1937–1950 | 168 | 0 | 168 | 50 | |
| Darren Peacock | England | DF | 1990–1994 | 140 | 3 | 143 | 7 | |
| Gavin Peacock | England | MF | 1984–1987; 1996–2002 | 206 | 19 | 215 | 42 | |
| George Petchey | England | FB | 1953–1960 | 278 | 0 | 278 | 24 | |
| William Pierce | England | FB | 1923–1931 | 193 | 0 | 193 | 3 | |
| Johnny Poppitt | England | FB | 1950–1954 | 111 | 0 | 111 | 0 | |
| George Powell | England | FB | 1947–1953 | 155 | 0 | 155 | 0 | |
| Ivor Powell | Wales | FB | 1938–1949 | 159 | 0 | 159 | 2 | |
| Mike Powell | England | FB | 1951–1959 | 109 | 0 | 109 | 0 | |
| Henry Pullen | England | FB | 1910–1920 | 202 | 0 | 202 | 1 | |
| Karl Ready | Wales | DF | 1991–2001 | 224 | 22 | 246 | 11 | |
| Alfred Ridyard | England | HB | 1938–1948 | 243 | 0 | 243 | 9 | |
| Tony Roberts | Wales | GK | 1987–1998 | 145 | 1 | 146 | 0 | |
| Glenn Roeder | England | MF | 1978–1983 | 181 | 0 | 181 | 18 | |
| Jack Rose | England | FB | 1945–1949 | 138 | 0 | 138 | 0 | |
| Matthew Rose | England | DF | 1997–2007 | 236 | 24 | 250 | 8 | |
| George Rounce | England | FW | 1928–1933 | 188 | 0 | 188 | 71 | |
| Martin Rowlands | Republic of Ireland | MF | 2003–2012 | 198 | 19 | 217 | 37 | |
| Keith Rutter | England | FB | 1954–1963 | 369 | 0 | 369 | 2 | |
| Keith Sanderson | England | MF | 1965–1970 | 118 | 6 | 124 | 12 | |
| Josh Scowen | England | MF | 2017–2020 | 81 | 22 | 103 | 4 | |
| David Seaman | England | GK | 1986–1990 | 175 | 0 | 175 | 0 | |
| Don Shanks | England | DF | 1974–1981 | 201 | 5 | 206 | 11 | |
| Charlie Shaw | Scotland | GK | 1907–1913 | 251 | 0 | 251 | 0 | |
| Ernie Shepherd | England | FW | 1950–1956 | 233 | 0 | 233 | 54 | |
| Danny Shittu | Nigeria | DF | 2001–2006; 2011–2012 | 185 | 5 | 190 | 17 | |
| Frank Sibley | England | DF | 1965–1971 | 165 | 3 | 168 | 5 | |
| Trevor Sinclair | England | MF | 1993–1998 | 185 | 5 | 190 | 21 | |
| Andy Sinton | England | MF | 1989–1993 | 190 | 0 | 190 | 25 | |
| Albert Smith | England | HB | 1942–1949 | 144 | 0 | 144 | 7 | |
| Conway Smith | England | FW | 1951–1956 | 181 | 0 | 181 | 83 | |
| Paul Smyth | Northern Ireland | FW | 2017–2021; 2023– | 85 | 67 | 152 | 13 | |
| Jack Smith | England | FW | 1919–1922 | 159 | 0 | 159 | 66 | |
| Matt Smith | England | FW | 2017–2019 | 43 | 59 | 102 | 23 | |
| Alex Smithies | England | GK | 2015–2018 | 107 | 2 | 109 | 0 | |
| Peter Springett | England | GK | 1963–1967 | 161 | 0 | 161 | 0 | |
| Ron Springett | England | GK | 1955–1958; 1965–1969 | 147 | 0 | 147 | 0 | |
| Simon Stainrod | England | FW | 1980–1985 | 175 | 2 | 177 | 62 | |
| Jan Stejskal | Czech Republic | GK | 1990–1994 | 122 | 1 | 123 | 0 | |
| Damion Stewart | Jamaica | DF | 2006–2010 | 163 | 5 | 168 | 13 | |
| Sydney Sweetman | England | FB | 1925–1929 | 102 | 0 | 102 | 0 | |
| Reg Swinfen | England | FW | 1938–1946 | 124 | 0 | 124 | 42 | |
| Adel Taarabt | Morocco | MF | 2009–2015 | 135 | 29 | 164 | 34 | |
| Dave Thomas | England | MF | 1972–1977 | 219 | 1 | 220 | 34 | |
| William Thompson | Scotland | HB | 1912–1914; 1920–1920 | 139 | 0 | 139 | 8 | |
| Terry Venables | England | MF | 1969–1974 | 205 | 1 | 206 | 22 | |
| Gary Waddock | Republic of Ireland | MF | 1979–1987; 1991–1992 | 227 | 13 | 240 | 10 | |
| William Wake | England | HB | 1909–1916 | 240 | 0 | 240 | 1 | |
| Ian Watson | England | DF | 1965–1974 | 226 | 6 | 232 | 2 | |
| David Webb | England | DF | 1974–1978 | 146 | 1 | 147 | 11 | |
| Jack White | England | HB | 1901–1908 | 140 | 0 | 140 | 1 | |
| Alfred Whyman | England | FW | 1909–1920 | 206 | 0 | 206 | 25 | |
| Steve Wicks | England | DF | 1979–1981; 1982–1986 | 220 | 1 | 221 | 6 | |
| Chris Willock | England | MF | 2020–2024 | 104 | 40 | 144 | 20 | |
| Clive Wilson | England | DF | 1990–1995 | 196 | 3 | 199 | 14 | |
| Ray Wilkins | England | MF | 1989–1994; 1994–1996 | 200 | 7 | 207 | 10 | |
| Pat Woods | England | FB | 1950–1961 | 333 | 0 | 333 | 16 | |
| Paweł Wszołek | Poland | MF | 2016–2017; 2017–2019 | 88 | 25 | 113 | 11 | |
| Steve Yates | England | DF | 1993–1999 | 137 | 12 | 149 | 2 | |
