= 1955–56 Queens Park Rangers F.C. season =

English football club season

Queens Park Rangers
1955–56 season
- Chairman: Albert Hittinger
- Manager: Jack Taylor
- Stadium: Loftus Road
- Football League Third Division South: 18th
- FA Cup: First Round
- Southern Professional Floodlight Cup: Round One
- London Challenge Cup: Winners
- Top goalscorer: League: Conway Smith 19; All: Conway Smith 19
- Highest home attendance: 11,885 v Southend (8 October 1955)
- Lowest home attendance: 3,910 v Newport County (11 February 1956)
- Biggest win: 6–2 v Colchester United (10 March 1956)
- Biggest defeat: 1–7 v Orient (3 March 1956)
Home colours	Away colours	Third colours

The 1955–56 Queens Park Rangers season was the club's 65th season of existence and their 4th back in the Football League Third Division following their relegation in the 1951–52 season. QPR finished 18th in their league campaign, and were eliminated in the first round of the FA Cup. In November they defeated Brentford 2-1 in the London Challenge Cup Final.

== League standings ==
Pos	Team	Pld	W	D	L	GF	GA	GAv	Pts
16	Exeter City	46	15	10	21	58	77	0.753	40
17	Reading	46	15	9	22	70	79	0.886	39
18	Queens Park Rangers	46	14	11	21	64	86	0.744	39
19	Newport County	46	15	9	22	58	79	0.734	39
20	Walsall	46	15	8	23	68	84	0.810	38

== Results ==
QPR scores given first

Win Draw Loss

=== Third Division South ===
Date	Opponents (position prior to match)	H / A	Result F–A	Scorers	Attendance	Position
20 August 1955	Brighton (-)	A	1–1	Clark	14510	12
22 August 1955	Brentford (22)	H	1–1	Cameron	11688	8
27 August 1955	Southampton (10)	H	4–0	Shepherd 2, Smith, Angell	10672	7
30 August 1955	Brentford (21)	A	0–2		12947	10
3 September 1955	Shrewsbury (6)	A	1–1	Shepherd	11233	11
5 September 1955	Crystal Palace (15)	H	0–3		9083	16
10 September 1955	Ipswich (13)	H	1–1	Clark	11763	15
14 September 1955	Crystal Palace (14)	A	1–1	Shepherd	10543	15
17 September 1955	Walsall (21)	A	2–2	Smith, Clark	12427	15
19 September 1955	Northampton (1)	A	2–5	Smith 2	9735	16
24 September 1955	Torquay	H	3–1	Cameron 2, Smith	10536	14
26 September 1955	Swindon	H	1–0	Cameron	5181	11
1 October 1955	Newport (15)	A	1–2	Smith	7375	14
8 October 1955	Southend (4)	H	1–2	Shepherd	11885	15
15 October 1955	Exeter City (21)	A	0–2		8741	19
22 October 1955	Orient (3)	H	0–1		11856	19
29 October 1955	Colchester (16)	A	1–4	Clark	7339	21
5 November 1955	Norwich City (8)	H	2–3	Petchey, Smith	10162	23
12 November 1955	Bournemouth & Boscombe Ath. (18)	A	0–1		6934	22
26 November 1955	Millwall (21)	A	0–2		7602	22
3 December 1955	Reading (22)	H	3–3	Smith 2, Angell	7088	22
17 December 1955	Brighton (3)	H	2–1	Cameron, Clark	7648	21
24 December 1955	Southampton (14)	A	0–4		9502	22
26 December 1955	Aldershot (16)	A	2–1	Smith 2	6366	21
27 December 1955	Aldershot (16)	H	2–2	Cameron 2	8378	21
31 December 1955	Shrewsbury(10)	H	1–1	Smith	7779	21
7 January 1956	Gillingham	H	2–2	Smith 2	7306	21
14 January 1956	Ipswich Town (1)	A	1–4	Clark	12168	21
21 January 1956	Walsall (21)	H	3–2	Petchey 2, Pounder	6591	18
28 January 1956	Watford (19)	A	1–0	Angell	5784	18
4 February 1956	Torquay	A	0–2		5176	18
11 February 1956	Newport County (15)	H	0–0		3910	17
18 February 1956	Southend (8)	A	1–5	Smith	6952	18
25 February 1956	Exeter City (18)	H	1–0	Cameron	6898	17
3 March 1956	Orient (1)	A	1–7	Shepherd	12614	20
10 March 1956	Colchester (9)	H	6–2	Shepherd 2, Kerrins, Cameron, Smith, Petchey	7954	17
17 March 1956	Norwich City (7)	A	0–1		13355	18
24 March 1956	Bournemouth & Boscombe Ath. (14)	H	0–1		5832	18
30 March 1956	Coventry City (7)	H	1–2	Cameron	10956	20
31 March 1956	Gillingham	A	2–0	Clark, Cameron	5462	20
3 April 1956	Coventry City (5)	A	1–4	Clark	16714	20
7 April 1956	Millwall (21)	H	4–0	Shepherd, Ingham, Smith (pen), Clark	13402	18
14 April 1956	Reading (15)	A	1–3	Cameron	4697	20
21 April 1956	Watford (16)	H	3–2	Kerrins, Cameron, Angell	7603	21
25 April 1956	Swindon	A	1–0	Smith	4617	19
28 April 1956	Northampton(11)	H	3–2	Clark 2, Smith	7157	18

=== London Challenge Cup ===
Date	Round	Opponents	H / A	Result F–A	Scorers	Attendance
3 October 1955	First Round	Barnet	H	3–1		
17 October 1955	Quarter-Finals	Millwall	A	1–1		
24 October 1955	Quarter-Finals replay	Millwall	H	4–0		
1 November 1955	Semi final	Arsenal	A	2–1		
15 November 1955	Final	Brentford	H	2–1		

=== Southern Professional Floodlight Cup ===
Date	Round	Opponents	H / A	Result F–A	Scorers	Attendance
31 October 1955	First Round	Orient	H	0–1		2790

=== FA Cup ===
Date	Round	Opponents	H / A	Result F–A	Scorers	Attendance
19 November 1955	First Round	Southend (Third Division South)	A	0–2		15000

=== Friendlies ===
Date	Opponents	
13-Aug-55	Whites v Reds	Practice Match
10-Oct-55	Queens Park Rangers v England Olympic XI	Friendly
17-Oct-55	Queens Park Rangers v Portsmouth	Friendly
10-Dec-55	Oldham Athletic v Queens Park Rangers	Friendly
5-Mar-56	Queens Park Rangers v All Star Managers XI	Harry Brown & W. Conway Smith Benefit
12-Mar-56	Queens Park Rangers v Fulham	Friendly
19-Mar-56	Queens Park Rangers v England Amateur XI	Friendly (Trial Match)
9-Apr-56	Queens Park Rangers v Middlesex Wanderers	Friendly (Charity Match)
18-Apr-56	Queens Park Rangers v Rampla Juniors	Friendly
30-Apr-56	Dover v Queens Park Rangers	Friendly

== Squad ==
Position	Nationality	Name	League Appearances	League Goals	Cup Appearances	F.A.Cup Goals	Southern Professional Floodlight Cup Goals	Total Appearances	Total Goals
GK	(England)	Ron Springett	9					9	
GK	(England)	Harry Brown	37		2			39	
DF	(England)	Tony Ingham	41	1	2			43	1
DF	(England)	Keith Rutter	21					21	
DF	(England)	Pat Woods	38		2			40	
DF	(England)	Albert Rhodes	4					4	
MF	(England)	Bill Nelson	9		1			10	
MF	(England)	Pat Kerrins	20	2				20	2
MF	(England)	George Crickson	3		1			4	
MF	(England)	Peter Angell	43	4	2			45	4
MF	(Scotland)	Bobby Cameron	43	13	2			45	13
MF	(England)	George Petchey	41	4	2			43	4
MF	(England)	Jobey Dean	12					12	
MF	(Northern Ireland)	Mike Powell	25					25	
FW	(England)	Conway Smith	37	19				37	19
FW	(England)	Arthur Longbottom	12					12	
FW	(Scotland)	George Dawson	1					1	
FW	(England)	Mike Hellawell	1					1	
FW	(Northern Ireland)	Ernie Shepherd	32	9	2			34	9
FW	(Northern Ireland)	Gordon Quinn	4		1			5	
FW	(Scotland)	Billy McKay	6		1			7	
FW	(Northern Ireland)	Mike Tomkys	9		2			11	
FW	(Scotland)	Willie Clark	38	11	1			39	11
FW	(England)	Albert Pounder	19	1				19	1
FW	(England)	Bill Temby	2					2	

== Transfers in ==
Name	from	Date	Fee
Bill Nelson	West Ham	July 1, 1955	
Billy McKay	Deal Town	July 1, 1955	
Mike Hellawell	Salts FC.	Aug 17,1955	
Leslie Locke *	Bromley	May 1956	
Tom Quigley	Portsmouth	June 4, 1956	
Cecil (Archie) Andrews	Crystal P	June 25, 1956	

== Transfers out ==
Name	from	Date	Fee	Date	Club	Fee
Brian Nicholas	Queens Park Rangers Juniors	May 1950		July 1955	Chelsea	£5,000
Stan Gullan	Clyde	July 9, 1949		July 1955	Tunbridge Wells	
Bill Spence	Portsmouth	December 22, 1951	8,000	July 1955	Retired (Inj.)	
Tom Fidler	Hounslow Town	May 1954		July 1955	Dover	
