= 1951–52 Queens Park Rangers F.C. season =

English football club season

Queens Park Rangers
1951–52 season
- Chairman: Albert Hittinger
- Manager: Dave Mangnall
- Stadium: Loftus Road
- Football League Second Division: 22nd
- FA Cup: Third Round
- London Challenge Cup: Round One
- Top goalscorer: League: Conway Smith 13; All: Conway Smith 13
- Highest home attendance: 25,339 v Brentford (29 Sept 1951)
- Lowest home attendance: 12,113 v Nottingham Forest (8 Dec 1951)
- Biggest win: 4–2 v Sheffield United (14 Apr 1952)
- Biggest defeat: 1–5 v Charlton (8 October 1951)
Home colours	Away colours

The 1951-52 Queens Park Rangers season was the club's 61st season of existence and their 4th in the Football League Second Division. QPR finished 22nd in their league campaign, being relegated back to the Football League Third Division, and were eliminated in the third round of the FA Cup.

== League standings ==
Pos	Team	Pld	W	D	L	GF	GA	GAv	Pts	Qualification or relegation
18	Hull City	42	13	11	18	60	70	0.857	37	
19	Swansea Town	42	12	12	18	72	76	0.947	36	
20	Barnsley	42	11	14	17	59	72	0.819	36	
21	Coventry City (R)	42	14	6	22	59	82	0.720	34	Relegation to the Third Division South
22	Queens Park Rangers (R)	42	11	12	19	52	81	0.642	34	Relegation to the Third Division South

Rules for classification: 1) Points; 2) Goal average; 3) Goals scored
(R) Relegated

== Results ==
QPR scores given first

Win Draw Loss

=== Second Division ===
Date	Opponents	Venue	Result F–A	Scorers	Attendance	Position
18 Aug 1951	West Ham United	Home	2–0	A. Addinall, E. Shepherd	19541	4
20 Aug 1951	Hull City	Home	1–1	C. Smith	15809	2
25 Aug 1951	Coventry City	Away	0–0		22646	2
30 Aug 1951	Hull City	Away	1–4	C. Smith	19661	14
1 Sept 1951	Swansea City	Home	1–1	C. Smith	18369	14
3 Sept 1951	Blackburn Rovers	Home	2–1	A. Addinall (2)	13392	5
8 Sept 1951	Bury	Away	1–3	L. Clayton	13115	15
15 Sept 1951	Luton Town	Home	0–0		17391	13
22 Sept 1951	Notts County	Away	0–0		27734	14
29 Sept 1951	Brentford	Home	3–1	E. Shepherd, C. Smith. H. Gilberg	25339	8
6 Oct 1951	Doncaster Rovers	Away	0–4		17673	15
13 Oct 1951	Everton	Home	4–4	E. Shepherd (2), Waugh, H. Gilberg	17256	12
20 Oct 1951	Southampton	Away	1–1	C. Smith	19150	14
27 Oct 1951	Sheffield Wednesday	Home	2–2	A. Addinall, C. Smith	18541	15
3 Nov 1951	Leeds United	Away	0–3		22875	16
10 Nov 1951	Rotherham United	Home	2–3	C. Smith, H. Gilberg	19072	18
17 Nov 1951	Cardiff City	Away	1–3	H. Gilberg	21211	19
24 Nov 1951	Birmingham City	Home	0–2		14945	19
1 Dec 1951	Leicester City	Away	0–4		23123	19
8 Dec 1951	Nottingham Forest	Home	4–3	E. Shepherd, H. Gilberg, C. Smith, C. Hatton (pen)	12113	19
15 Dec 1951	West Ham United	Away	2–4	H. Gilberg, C. Hatton (pen)	17549	19
22 Dec 1951	Coventry City	Home	1–4	C. Smith	12888	21
25 Dec 1951	Barnsley	Away	1–3	C. Hatton	15067	22
26 Dec 1951	Barnsley	Home	1–1	C. Smith	13862	22
29 Dec 1951	Swansea City	Away	3–2	H. Gilberg, B. Hill, A. Addinall	16146	21
1 Jan 1952	Blackburn Rovers	Away	2–4	B. Nicholas, A. Addinall	28671	21
5 Jan 1952	Bury	Home	3–2	H. Gilberg, C. Smith, A. Addinall	13539	20
16 Jan 1952	Doncaster Rovers	Home	0–2		14783	20
19 Jan 1952	Luton Town	Away	1–0	A. Addinall	15242	21
26 Jan 1952	Notts County	Home	1–4	H. Gilberg	18891	20
9 Feb 1952	Brentford	Away	0–0		25645	22
1 Mar 1952	Everton	Away	0–3		38172	22
8 Mar 1952	Southampton	Home	2–1	O. Hold, A. Addinall	19040	22
15 Mar 1952	Sheffield Wednesday	Away	1–2	B. Muir	41712	22
22 Mar 1952	Leeds United	Home	0–0		15195	22
29 Mar 1952	Rotherham United	Away	0–1		9311	22
5 Apr 1952	Cardiff City	Home	1–1	C. Smith (pen)	17938	22
12 Apr 1952	Birmingham City	Away	0–1		28286	22
14 Apr 1952	Sheffield United	Home	4–2	Farrow, A. Addinall (2), B. Muir	12714	22
19 Apr 1952	Leicester City	Home	1–0	A. Addinall	16827	22
26 Apr 1952	Nottingham Forest	Away	1–3	B. Muir	18975	22
3 May 1952	Sheffield United	Away	2–1	G. Stewart, C. Smith	11310	22

=== FA Cup ===
Date	Round	Opponents	H / A	Result F–A	Scorers	Attendance
12 January 1952	Third Round	Brentford (Second Division)	A	1–3	Shepherd	35,000

=== London Challenge Cup ===
Date	Round	Opponents	H / A	Result F–A	Scorers	Attendance
8 October 1951	First Round	Charlton	A	1–5		

=== Friendlies ===
11-Aug-51	Reds v Blues	h	Practice Match
14-Aug-51		h	Trial Match
28-Apr-52	Alex Stock XI	h	Stan Hudson Memorial
5-May-52	Kilmarnock	a	Friendly
9-May-52	Arbroath	A	Friendly
12-May-52	St Johnstone	A	Friendly
May, 1952	Uxbridge	A	Friendly

== Squad ==
Position	Nationality	Name	League Appearances	League Goals	F..A.Cup Appearances	F.A.Cup Goals	Total Appearances	Total Goals
GK	(England)	Harry Brown	36	0	1	0	37	0
GK	(Scotland)	Stan Gullan	4	0	0	0	4	0
GK	(England)	Dave Underwood	2	0	0	0	2	0
DF	(England)	Tony Ingham	17	0	1	0	18	0
DF	(England)	Des Farrow	32	1	0	0	32	1
DF	(England)	Bill Spence	20	0	1	0	21	0
DF	(England)	Bill Heath	14	0	0	0	14	0
DF	(England)	George Powell	33	0	1	0	34	0
DF	(England)	John Poppitt	25	0	0	0	25	0
DF	(England)	Tony Richardson	2	0	0	0	2	0
MF	(Scotland)	Bobby Cameron	5	0	0	0	5	0
MF	(England)	Lew Clayton	22	1	0	0	22	1
MF	(England)	Reg Chapman	15	0	0	0	15	0
MF	(Wales)	Brian Nicholas	6	1	0	0	6	1
FW	(England)	Conway Smith	41	13	1	0	42	13
FW	(Scotland)	George Stewart	9	1	0	0	9	1
FW	(England)	Ernie Shepherd	30	5	1	1	31	6
FW	(England)	Mike Tomkys	1	0	0	0	1	0
FW	(England)	Bert Addinall	36	12	1	0	37	12
FW	(Scotland)	Billy Waugh	36	1	1	0	37	1
FW	(England)	Cyril Hatton	6	3	0	0	6	3
FW	(England)	Harry Gilberg	45	9	2		47	9
FW	(England)	Oscar Hold	3	1	0	0	3	1
FW	(Scotland)	Billy Muir	10	3	0	0	10	3
FW	(England)	Billy Hill	10	1	1	0	11	1
FW	(Scotland)	Johnny McKay	2	0	0	0	2	0

== Transfers in ==
Name	from	Date	Fee
Stan Sweetman		July ?1951	
John Birch *		July ?1951	
Jimmy Watts *		July ?1951	
Harry Brown	Derby County	August 1, 1951	
Harry Gilberg	Tottenham Hotspur	August 18, 1951	£2,000
Gerry Crickson	Dover	September 21, 1951	
Mike Tomkys	Fulham	November 5, 1951	
Bill Spence	Portsmouth	December 22, 1951	£8,000
Oscar Hold	Everton	February 1952	
Jim Harrison	Willesden Town	February 1952	

== Transfers out ==
Name	from	Date	Fee	Date	Club	Fee
Alf Parkinson	Royal Navy	May 28, 1942		July 1951	Retired	
Horace Woodward	Tottenham Hotspur	June 14, 1949	£10,500	July 1951	Tonbridge	
Reg Saphin	Walthamstow Avenue	June 1946		July 1951	Watford	
Ted Duggan	Luton Town	February 2, 1949		July 1951	Worcester City	
Eddie Davies	Arsenal	April 1950	Free	July 1951	Crewe Alexandra	
George Wardle	Cardiff	January 25, 1949		August 1951	Darlington	
Dave Underwood	Edgware Town	December 1949		February 1952	Watford	
Dave Nelson	Brentford	February 1950		March 1952	Crystal Palace	
Cyril Stevens		August 1949		June? 52		
George Hitch		December 1950		June? 52		
Glyn Davies		March 1951		June? 52		
John Birch *		July ?1951		June? 52		
Jimmy Watts *		July ?1951		June? 52	Southampton	
