= 1956–57 Queens Park Rangers F.C. season =

English football club season

Queens Park Rangers
1956–57 season
- Chairman: Albert Hittinger
- Manager: Jack Taylor
- Stadium: Loftus Road
- Football League Third Division South: 10th
- FA Cup: Third Round
- Southern Professional Floodlight Cup: Round Two
- London Challenge Cup: Quarter-finals
- Top goalscorer: League: Arthur Longbottom 14; All: Arthur Longbottom 15
- Highest home attendance: 14,211 v Watford (13 October 1956)
- Lowest home attendance: 5,307 v Crystal Palace (25 December 1956)
- Biggest win: 5–0 v Gillingham (29 April 1957)
- Biggest defeat: 1–5 v Coventry City (15 September 1956)
Home colours	Away colours	Third colours

The 1956-57 Queens Park Rangers season was the club's 66th season of existence and their 5th back in the Football League Third Division following their relegation in the 1951–52 season. QPR finished 10th in their league campaign, and were eliminated in the third round of the FA Cup.

At seasons end future England forward Mike Hellawell was transferred to top division Birmingham City in 1957 in part-exchange for inside-forward Bill Finney and £6,000. When questioned by disappointed supporters, manager Jack Taylor explained that Hellawell had signed for Rangers on condition that "they would not stand in his way if a First Division Club came after him."

== League standings ==
Pos	Team	Pld	W	D	L	GF	GA	GAv	Pts
8	Brentford	46	16	16	14	78	76	1.026	48
9	Shrewsbury Town	46	15	18	13	72	79	0.911	48
10	Queens Park Rangers	46	18	11	17	61	60	1.017	47
11	Watford	46	18	10	18	72	75	0.960	46
12	Newport County	46	16	13	17	65	62	1.048	45

== Results ==
QPR scores given first

Win Draw Loss

=== Third Division South ===
Date	Opponent	H / A	Result F–A	Scorers	Attendance	League position
18 August 1956	Reading	A	0–1		11,417	13
20 August 1956	Plymouth Argyle	A	2–1	Angell, Longbottom	15,718	9
25 August 1956	Newport County	H	1–1	Hellawell	7,863	13
27 August 1956	Plymouth Argyle	H	3–0	Quigley 2, Hellawell	8,450	6
1 September 1956	Colchester United	A	1–1	Quigley	8,179	10
6 September 1956	Northampton	A	0–3		7,591	15
8 September 1956	Norwich City	H	3–1	Angell, Locke, Quigley	12,631	11
10 September 1956	Northampton	H	1–0	Longbottom	10,785	5
15 September 1956	Coventry City	A	1–5	Quigley	18,160	12
19 September 1956	Swindon	A	0–1		8,705	14
22 September 1956	Southampton	H	1–2	Hellawell	12,792	15
24 September 1956	Swindon	H	3–0	Quigley 2, Temby	9,526	14
29 September 1956	Exeter City	A	0–0		7,312	15
6 October 1956	Aldershot	A	2–4	Cameron, Hellawell	5,609	15
13 October 1956	Watford	H	3–1	Hellawell, Balogun, Brown (og)	14,211	13
20 October 1956	Shrewsbury Town	A	0–0		8,463	12
27 October 1956	Walsall	H	1–0	Kerrins	9,461	10
3 November 1956	Ipswich Town	A	0–4		12,278	13
10 November 1956	Bournemouth & Boscombe Ath.	H	2–1	Petchey, Locke	8,554	11
24 November 1956	Millwall	H	0–0		10,427	11
1 December 1956	Brighton	A	0–1		9,770	13
15 December 1956	Reading	H	1–1	Peacock	5,472	12
22 December 1956	Newport County	A	1–1	Peacock	7,638	12
25 December 1956	Crystal Palace	A	1–2	Peacock	9,988	15
26 December 1956	Crystal Palace	H	4–2	Cameron 2, Kerrins 2	5,307	12
29 December 1956	Colchester	H	1–1	Kerrins	8,801	11
5-Jan-1957	Southend United	H	PP			
12 January 1957	Norwich City	A	2–1	Longbottom, Pointer (og)	11,722	10
19 January 1957	Coventry City	H	1–1	Petchey	7,863	9
26-Jan-1957	Southend United	A	PP			
2 February 1957	Southampton	A	2–1	Hellawell, Longbottom	17,074	9
9 February 1957	Exeter	H	5–3	Longbottom 3, Kerrins, Andrews	8,639	8
16 February 1957	Aldershot	H	0–1		10,525	11
23 February 1957	Watford	A	4–2	Temby, Cameron, Balogun, Shipwright (og)	4,428	11
2 March 1957	Shrewsbury	H	2–1	Balogun, Temby	9,984	7
9 March 1957	Gillingham	A	1–0	Kerrins	7,581	5
16 March 1957	Ipswich Town	H	0–2		12,339	7
23 March 1957	Bournemouth & Boscombe Ath.	A	0–1		12,552	10
25 March 1957	Southend	H	3–0	Hellawell, Peacock, Longbottom	6,412	6
30 March 1957	Torquay	H	0–1		9,605	7
6 April 1957	Millwall	A	0–2		10,834	10
13 April 1957	Brighton	H	0–0		6,957	9
15 April 1957	Southend	A	0–3		6,052	10
19 April 1957	Brentford	A	0–2		13,841	10
20 April 1957	Walsall	A	2–0	Longbottom 2	10,924	8
22 April 1957	Brentford	H	2–2	Longbottom, Dargie (og)	9,661	10
27 April 1957	Torquay	A	0–3		8,630	11
29 April 1957	Gillingham	H	5–0	Longbottom 3, Kerrins, Cameron	6,237	10

=== London Challenge Cup ===
Date	Round	Opponents	H / A	Result F–A	Scorers	Attendance
1 October 1956	First round	Walthamstow	H	7-0	Locke 3, Cameron 2, Balogun, Rhodes (pen)	
15 October 1956	Quarter-finals	Arsenal	A	2–2	Cameron, Peacock	
22 October 1956	Quarter-finals replay	Arsenal	H	1–3	Balogun	

=== Southern Professional Floodlight Cup ===
Date	Round	Opponents	H / A	Result F–A	Scorers	Attendance
8 October 1956	First round	Millwall	H	5–2	Balogun 2, Locke 2, Woods (pen)	5,000
26 November 1956	Second round	Reading	H	1–2	McLaren (og)	3,012

=== FA Cup ===
Date	Round	Opponents	H / A	Result F–A	Scorers	Attendance
17 November 1956	First round	Dorchester (Western League)	H	4–0	Hellawell, Locke, Balogun, Cameron	9,764
8 December 1956	Second round	Tooting & Mitcham United (Isthmian League)	A	2–0	Balogun, Longbottom	11,450
5 January 1957	Third round	Sunderland (First Division)	A	0–4		30,577

=== Friendlies ===
Date	Opponents	
11-Aug-56	Whites v Reds	Practice Match
5-Nov-56	Queens Park Rangers v All Star Managers XI	Friendly
26-Jan-57	Brentford v Queens Park Rangers	Friendly
xx-Jan-57	Headington United v Queens Park Rangers	Friendly
18-Mar-57	Queens Park Rangers v Middlesex Wanderers	Friendly
2-Apr-57	Headington United v Queens Park Rangers	Friendly
11-May-57	Chalvey v Queens Park Rangers	Friendly

== Squad ==
Position	Nationality	Name	League appearances	League goals	Cup appearances	Cup goals	Total appearances	Total goals
GK	(England)	Ron Springett	46		5		51	
DF	(England)	Peter Lay	1				1	
DF	(England)	Tony Ingham	46		5		51	
DF	(England)	Keith Rutter	44		5		49	
DF	(England)	Pat Woods	45		5		50	1
DF	(England)	Arthur Rhodes	1				1	
MF	(England)	Pat Kerrins	31		3		34	
MF	(England)	Cecil Andrews	46	1	5		51	1
MF	(England)	Peter Angell	16	2	2		18	2
MF	(Scotland)	Bobby Cameron	31	5	4	1	35	6
MF	(England)	George Petchey	43	2	5		48	2
MF	(England)	Jobey Dean	4				4	
MF	(Northern Ireland)	Mike Powell	1				1	
FW	(England)	Arthur Longbottom	35	14	3	1	38	15
FW	(Nigeria)	Teslim Balogun	14	4	2	1	16	7
FW	(England)	Mike Hellawell	44	7	5		49	7
FW	(Scotland)	Lesley Locke	20	2	3	1	23	5
FW	(Northern Ireland)	Alec Dawson	1				1	
FW	(Northern Ireland)	Gordon Quinn	4				4	
FW	(Scotland)	Tommy Quigley	16	7	1		17	7
FW	(England)	Terry Peacock	13	3	2	1	15	4
FW	(England)	Bill Temby	4	3			4	3

== In ==
Name	From	Date	Fee
Peter Lay	Nottingham Forest	July 13, 1956	
Keith Petchey	Millwall	July 24, 1956	
Peter Knibbs *		August ?1956	
Terry Peacock	Hull City Juniors	August 2, 1956	
Jesilimi (Tesi) Balogun	Skegness Town	September 1956	
Stuart Richardson	Methley U	November 1956	
George Knox *		December ?1956	
George Wood *	Wealdstone	January 1957	Loan
Tony Newcombe	Marlow	February 4, 1957	
Alec Dawson	Gourock Jnrs	February 12, 1957	
Ken Humphrey	Ware Town	March 1957	
David Baker		April 6, 1957	
John Crabb *		May 9, 1957	
Jim Stanbrook	Basildon	May 14, 1957	
Bill Finney	Birmingham City	15 May 1957	plus £6,000 for Mike Hellawell
Tommy Standley	Basildon United	May 18, 1957	
Albert Allum	Dover	June 1, 1957	£200
Doug Orr *	Queen's Park	June 14, 1957	

=== Out ===
Name	Club	Date	Fee	Date	Club	Fee
Billy McKay	Deal Town	July 1, 1955		July 1956	Dover	
George Crickson		September 21, 1951		July? 1956	Dover	
Hugh Rainey	Portsmouth	June 1955		July 1956	Aldershot	
Bill Nelson	West Ham	July 1955		July 1956		
Billy McKay	Deal Town	July 1955		July 1956	Dover Town	
Willie Clark	Petershill	February 1954		July 1956	Berwick Rangers	
Albert Pounder	Charlton	February 1954		July 1956	Sittingbourne	
Willie Clark	Petershill	February 1, 1954		August 1956	Berwick Rangers	
Harry Brown	Derby			September 1956	Plymouth	
Bill Nelson	West Ham	July 1, 1955		September 1956	Ramsgate Athletic	
Gordon Quinn	Eastcote	August 22, 1952		September 1956	Plymouth	
Peter Knibbs *		August ?1956		November 1956	Slough Town	
George Knox *		December ?1956		February 1957		
George Wood *	Wealdstone	January 1957	Loan	February 1957	Wealdstone	Loan
Mike Hellawell	Salts FC	August 17, 1955		15 May 1957	Birmingham City	£6,000 plus Bill Finney.
