= 1959–60 Queens Park Rangers F.C. season =

English football club season

Queens Park Rangers
1959–60 season
- Chairman: Albert Hittinger
- Manager: Alec Stock
- Stadium: Loftus Road
- Football League Third Division: 8th
- FA Cup: Second Round
- Southern Professional Floodlight Cup: Round One
- London Challenge Cup: Quarter-Finals
- Top goalscorer: League: Brian Bedford 25; All: Brian Bedford 27
- Highest home attendance: 19,532 v Brentford (31 October 1959)
- Lowest home attendance: 4,346 v Chesterfield (28 March 1960)
- Biggest win: 5–1 v Accrington Stanley (23 January 1960); Bradford (5 April 1960)
- Biggest defeat: 2–4 v Brentford (31 October 1959)
Home colours	Away colours	Third colours

The 1959-60 Queens Park Rangers season was the club's 69th season of existence and their 8th back in the Football League Third Division following their relegation in the 1951–52 season. QPR finished 8th in their league campaign, and were eliminated in the second round of the FA Cup. The start of the 1959–60 season saw the arrival of arguably the club's greatest ever manager, Alec Stock.

Brian Bedford begin his goal scoring career after signing from Bournemouth for £750

== League standings ==
Pos	Team	Pld	W	D	L	GF	GA	GAv	Pts
6	Brentford	46	21	9	16	78	61	1.279	51
7	Bury	46	21	9	16	64	51	1.255	51
8	Queens Park Rangers	46	18	13	15	73	54	1.352	49
9	Colchester United	46	18	11	17	83	74	1.122	47
10	Bournemouth & Boscombe Athletic	46	17	13	16	72	72	1.000	47

== Results ==
QPR scores given first

Win Draw Loss

=== Third Division ===
Date	Opponents	Venue	Result F–A	Scorers	Attendance	Position
22 August 1959	Swindon (-)	H	2–0	Longbottom, 13' Whitelaw 73'	12,206	9
24 August 1959	Southend (16)	A	2–3	Whitelaw 2	12,197	10
29 August 1959	Chesterfield	A	4–0	Pearson 2, Bedford, Whitelaw	8,890	6
31 August 1959	Southend (16)	H	0–0		13,488	6
5 September 1959	Newport County (14)	H	3–0	Longbottom, Bedford 2	10,774	5
7 September 1959	York City	A	1–2	Pearson	10,593	7
12 September 1959	Accrington Stanley	A	2–1	Andrews, Longbottom	5,336	4
14 September 1959	York City	H	0–0		11,857	8
19 September 1959	AFC Bournemouth (8)	H	3–0	Bedford, Nelson (og), Golding	11,410	4
21 September 1959	Coventry City (8)	A	0–0		16,759	4
26 September 1959	Tranmere (14)	A	3–0	Bedford, Golding 2	11,252	3
28 September 1959	Coventry City (6)	H	2–1	Golding 2	16,154	2
3 October 1959	Wrexham	H	2–1	Angell 2	12,732	2
5 October 1959	Grimsby Town (11)	H	0–0		15,257	1
10 October 1959	Mansfield (24)	A	3–4	Petchey, Locke 2	7,526	2
13 October 1959	Grimsby Town (13)	A	1–3	Angell	6,024	3
17 October 1959	Halifax (1)	H	3–0	Longbottom, Whitelaw, Petchey	13,787	1
24 October 1959	Bury	A	0–2		10,079	4
31 October 1959	Brentford (10)	H	2–4	Bedford 2	19,532	7
7 November 1959	Southampton (3)	A	1–2	Bedford	18,169	9
21 November 1959	Shrewsbury (4)	A	1–1	Bedford	10,084	8
28 November 1959	Port Vale (15)	H	2–2	Bedford 2	8,775	8
12 December 1959	Barnsley (14)	A	1–2	Bedford	4,450	10
19 December 1959	Swindon	A	1–2	Woods 49' pen	5,798	10
26 December 1959	Colchester (8)	H	3–1	Bedford 2, Angell	6,480	9
28 December 1959	Colchester (8)	A	0–2		9,095	12
2-Jan-1960	Chesterfield	H	PP			
9-Jan-1960	Reading	H	PP			
16 January 1960	Newport County (10)	A	3–2	Bedford 3	4,194	9
23 January 1960	Accrington Stanley	H	5–1	Andrews 2, Kerrins, Locke, Bedford	4,721	8
30 January 1960	Norwich (4)	A	0–1		17,053	9
6 February 1960	AFC Bournemouth (6)	A	1–1	Bedford	9,855	10
13 February 1960	Tranmere (21)	H	2–1	Andrews, Keen	5,019	9
20-Feb-1960	Wrexham	A	PP			
27 February 1960	Mansfield (23)	H	2–0	Woods (pen), Longbottom	7,834	9
5 March 1960	Halifax Town (17)	A	1–3	Woods (pen)	6,731	11
7 March 1960	Reading (19)	H	2–0	Andrews, Bedford	6,715	8
12 March 1960	Bury	A	2–0	Cini, Andrews	9,088	6
19 March 1960	Port Vale (8)	A	0–0		7,049	6
26 March 1960	Southampton (1)	H	0–1		11,734	9
28 March 1960	Chesterfield	H	3–3	Bedford 2, Petchey	4,346	6
2 April 1960	Reading (20)	A	0–2		8,975	8
9 April 1960	Shrewsbury Town (5)	A	1–1	Bedford	6,831	10
15 April 1960	Bradford (15)	A	5–1	Petchey, Longbottom, Bedford 2, Andrews	6,265	7
16 April 1960	Brentford (6)	A	1–1	Golding	16,025	7
18 April 1960	Bradford (17)	A	1–3	Andrews	6,265	8
23 April 1960	Norwich (2)	H	0–0		15,319	8
30 April 1960	Barnsley (17)	H	1–0	Andrews	5,700	8
4 May 1960	Wrexham	A	1–1	Woods	2,819	8

=== FA Cup ===
Date	Round	Opponents	H / A	Result F–A	Scorers	Attendance
14 November 1959	First Round	Colchester (Third Division)	A	3-2	Petchey, Bedford, Angell	8866
5 December 1959	Second Round	Port Vale (Third Division)	H	3–3	Longbottom 2, Bedford	11143
7 December 1959	Second Round Replay	Port Vale (Third Division)	A	1–2	Andrews	9513

=== London Challenge Cup ===
Date	Round	Opponents	H / A	Result F–A	Scorers	Attendance
30 September 1959	First Round	Millwall	H	3–1		
19 October 1959	Quarter-Finals	Tottenham Hotspur	A	1–2		

=== Southern Professional Floodlight Cup ===
Date	Round	Opponents	H / A	Result F–A	Scorers	Attendance
26 Oct 1959	First Round	Leyton Orient	H	1–2	Longbottom	5,758

=== Friendlies ===
15-Aug-59	Whites v Reds	Practice Match
2-Jan-60	Chelmsford v Queens Park Rangers	Friendly
9-Jan-60	Queens Park Rangers v Southend United	Friendly
14-Mar-60	Queens Park Rangers v Middlesex Wanderers	Friendly
22-Mar-60	Cambridge City v Queens Park Rangers	Friendly

== Squad ==
Position	Nationality	Name	League Appearances	League Goals	Cup Appearances	F.A.Cup Goals	Southern Professional Floodlight Cup Goals	Total Appearances	Total Goals
GK	(England)	Ray Drinkwater	28		1			29	
GK	(England)	Mike Pinner	18		3			21	
DF	(England)	Tony Ingham	46		4			50	
DF	(England)	Keith Rutter	46		4			50	
DF	(England)	Pat Woods	46	3	4			50	3
MF	(England)	Ken Whitfield	7		2			9	
MF	(England)	Pat Kerrins	7	1				7	1
MF	(England)	Mike Keen	27	1	3			30	1
MF	(England)	John Pearson	5	3				5	3
MF	(England)	Peter Angell	33	4	4	1		37	5
MF	(England)	Arthur Longbottom	37	6	4	2	1	41	9
MF	(England)	John Collins	2					2	
MF	(England)	George Petchey	41	4	2	1		43	5
FW	(Malta)	Joe Cini	7	1				7	1
FW	(Scotland)	Lesley Locke	9	3				9	3
FW	(Northern Ireland)	Paddy Hasty	1					1	
FW	(England)	Norman Golding	22	6	2			28	6
FW	(Wales)	Brian Bedford	44	25	4	2		48	27
FW	(Scotland)	George Whitelaw	15	5	1			16	5
FW	(England)	Clive Clark	19		2			21	
FW	(Wales)	Jimmy Andrews	46	10	4	1		50	11

== Transfers In ==
Name	from	Date	Fee
Bert Brown	Crystal P	July 9, 1959	
Mike Pinner	Corinthian-Casuals	July 15, 1959	
Brian Bedford	Bournemouth	July 15, 1959	£750
Ken Whitfield	Brighton & Hove Albion	July 27, 1959	
Brian Skingley	Crystal P	July 31, 1959	
David Pollard		July ?1959	
Ken Wilkins *		July ?1959	
John Collins	Queens Park Rangers Juniors	August 21, 1959	
Norman (Jimmy) Golding	Tonbridge	August 24, 1959	Free
John Brown		August 31, 1959	
Paddy Hasty	Leyton Orient	October 22, 1959	
Mike Barber	Arsenal	November 30, 1959	
Roy Keeble	Cambridge City	December 1959	Free
Mike Barber	Arsenal	December 1959	
Alan Jones *		January 1960	
Maurice Williams *	Harrow Town	January 29, 1960	
Donald Tomkins		February 10, 1960	
Derrick Razzell *	Carshalton	March 4, 1960	
Roy Walker *		April ?1960	
Peter Carey	Leyton Orient	May 20, 1960	

== Transfers Out ==
Name	from	Date	Fee	Date	Club	Fee
Alec Dawson	Gourock	February 12, 1957		July 1959	Sittingbourne	
David Dunsmuir	Dundee	May 31, 1958		July? 59	Poole Town	
Jim Stanbrook	Basildon	May 14, 1957		July? 59	Bedford Town	
Brian Kelly	Dover	November 1958		July 1959	Bexleyheath & Welling U	
Tommy Anderson	Bournemouth	November 1958		July 1959	Torquay United	
Stuart Richardson	Methley United	November 1956		July 1959	Oldham Athletic	Free
Pat Welton	Leyton Orient	March 17, 1958		July 1959	St. Albans City (Manager)	
Bobby Cameron	Port Glasgow	June 19, 1950		July 1959	Leeds United	
Mike Powell	QPR Juniors	January 23, 1951		July 1959	Yiewsley	
Mike Tomkys	Fulham	November 5, 1951		September 1959	Yiewsley	
Ken Wilkins *		July ?1959		November 1959	St. Albans City	
George Whitelaw	Sunderland	March 12, 1959	£2,000	December 1959	Halifax Town	
Paddy Hasty	Leyton Orient	October 22, 1959		January ? 1960	Tooting & Mitcham United	
Roy Keeble	Cambridge City	December 1959	Free	February 1960	Free	Free
Joe Cini	Hibernians, Malta	August 1959		March 1960	Sliema Wanderers	
George Petchey	West Ham	July 17, 1953	Free	May 1960	Crystal P	
Bert Brown	Crystal P	July 9, 1959		May 1960	Feltham	Free
John Brown		August 31, 1959		May 1960		Free
Pat Kerrins	QPR Juniors	December 21, 1953		June 1960	Crystal Palace	
