= Ron Higgins =

English footballer (1923–2016)

Personal information
- Full name: Ronald Valentine Higgins
- Date of birth: 14 February 1923
- Place of birth: Custom House, England
- Date of death: 23 January 2016 (aged 92)
- Place of death: Newham, England
- Position: Centre forward

Youth career
- West Ham United

Senior career*
Years	Team	Apps	(Gls)
- Leyton
- Clapton
- Green & Silley Weir
1949–1950	Leyton Orient	2	(0)
1950–1952	Tonbridge		
1952–1953	Brighton & Hove Albion	8	(0)
1953–1954	Queens Park Rangers	3	(1)
1954–1955	Sittingbourne		
1955–1956	Chelmsford City	14	(7)

Managerial career
- East Ham United
- * Club domestic league appearances and goals

Ronald Valentine Higgins (14 February 1923 – 23 January 2016) was an English footballer who played as a centre forward.

== Early life ==
Born in Maplin Road, Custom House, Higgins began his career with local club West Ham United. Whilst in the youth ranks at West Ham, Higgins scored five times in a 6–1 win against London rivals Tottenham Hotspur. In 1939, Higgins joined R & H Green & Silley Weir in the Royal Docks as an apprentice driller. During World War II, Higgins served as a gunner in the Royal Air Force, surviving 32 missions. A supporter of the Labour Party, Higgins was a trade union convenor following the war, first voting in a general election in 1945. Higgins also won numerous awards as a sprinter in the Essex County Championships.

== Club career ==
Before joining the Royal Air Force, Higgins played amateur football with Leyton and Clapton. Following the war, Higgins played for works team Green & Silley Weir. In December 1949, Higgins signed amateur forms with Leyton Orient. Whilst at Leyton Orient, Higgins made three appearances for the club in the Third Division South, before signing for Tonbridge in September 1950.

In January 1952, Higgins returned to the Football League, signing for Brighton & Hove Albion. At Brighton, Higgins made eight league appearances before departing the following January to join Queens Park Rangers, with Bert Addinall being exchanged as part of the transfer. On 28 February 1953, Higgins made his debut for Queens Park Rangers, against his former employers Brighton, scoring in a 3–3 draw at home. Higgins made two further appearances in the league for QPR, without scoring.

In January 1954, Higgins dropped back into non-League football, signing for Sittingbourne. During the 1955–56 season, Higgins signed for Chelmsford City, following a successful trial with the club. At Chelmsford, Higgins scored nine goals in 17 appearances in all competitions.

== Managerial career ==
Following his playing career, Higgins managed East Ham United, winning the Woolwich Cup during his time at the club.
