= Arthur Longbottom (footballer) =

English footballer (1933–2023)

Personal information
- Full name: Arthur Longbottom
- Date of birth: 30 January 1933
- Place of birth: Leeds, England
- Date of death: 15 September 2023 (aged 90)
- Position: Inside forward

Youth career
- Methley United

Senior career*
Years	Team	Apps	(Gls)
1954–1961	Queens Park Rangers	201	(62)
1961–1963	Port Vale	52	(18)
1963	Millwall	10	(1)
1963–1964	Oxford United	34	(14)
1964–1965	Colchester United	33	(12)
1965–196?	Scarborough		
Total		330	(107)
- * Club domestic league appearances and goals

Arthur Langley (né Longbottom; 30 January 1933 – 15 September 2023) was an English footballer. An inside-forward, he scored 118 goals in 360 league and cup appearances in an 11-year career in the bottom two divisions of the Football League. He changed his surname from Longbottom to Langley after he retired from football.

Longbottom spent 1954 to 1961 at Queens Park Rangers before he was sold to Port Vale in May 1961 for a £2,000 fee. He was sold to Millwall for another £2,000 in January 1963 before joining Oxford United in the summer. He transferred to Colchester United in October 1964 and then moved into non-League football with Scarborough in May 1965. Though he never won any honours and was never promoted, he finished as top-scorer in seasons at QPR, Port Vale, and Oxford United.

== Career ==
Longbottom signed for Jack Taylor's Queens Park Rangers from Methley United in 1954 and made his debut in a 3–0 defeat against Leyton Orient in March 1955. QPR finished 15th in the Third Division South in 1954–55. They then posted an 18th-place finish in 1955–56. Taking over Conway Smith's mantle as the club's key attacker, Longbottom finished as the club's top-scorer in 1956–57 with 15 goals, helping the club to a top ten finish. He scored 18 goals in 1957–58 to become the club's top-scorer once again; another tenth-place finish ensured Rangers a place in the restructured Third Division the following season. He hit 20 goals in 1958–59, becoming the club's top-scorer for a third consecutive season. New manager Alec Stock's new signing Brian Bedford then took over as the club's main source of goals, as QPR finished eighth in 1959–60, before finishing third in 1960–61 – missing out on promotion by just one place and two points. Longbottom played at inside-left and scored 62 goals in 201 league appearances during his seven years at Loftus Road.

Longbottom transferred to Norman Low's Third Division Port Vale for a £2,000 fee in May 1961. He scored in his debut on 19 August, in a 4–2 defeat to Shrewsbury Town at Gay Meadow. He bagged 20 goals in 49 games in the 1961–62 season to become the club's joint-top-scorer (with Bert Llewellyn). He scored twice in 11 games in 1962–63, but new boss Freddie Steele sold him on to league rivals Millwall in January 1963 for a £2,000 fee. He scored one goal in ten league games for Ron Gray's "Lions", before leaving The Den in the summer.

Longbottom joined up with Fourth Division side Oxford United and finished as the club's top-scorer in the 1963–64 season with 14 goals in 34 games. This tally included two goals in six games as Oxford became the first Fourth Division side to reach the sixth round of the FA Cup. Having performed well in Arthur Turner's team, he earned a move away from the Manor Ground and back into the Third Division. Longbottom joined Colchester United in October 1964 and went on to score 13 goals in 36 appearances in 1964–65 – one goal less than top-scorer Billy Stark. The "U's" suffered relegation however, and manager Neil Franklin allowed Longbottom to leave Layer Road on a free transfer to Midland League club Scarborough in May 1965.

== Later life and death ==
Following the end of his football career, he changed his surname via deed poll to Langley. He had trained to be a hairdresser whilst a player at QPR in preparation for a career after his retirement as a player. He settled in Scarborough with wife, Jean, with whom he had three children. Longbottom died on 15 September 2023 at the age of 90.

== Career statistics ==
Appearances and goals by club, season and competition
Club	Season	League			FA Cup		League Cup		Total	
Club	Season	Division	Apps	Goals	Apps	Goals	Apps	Goals	Apps	Goals
Queens Park Rangers	1954–55	Third Division South	11	1	0	0	—		11	1
Queens Park Rangers	1955–56	Third Division South	12	0	0	0	—		12	0
Queens Park Rangers	1956–57	Third Division South	34	14	2	1	—		36	15
Queens Park Rangers	1957–58	Third Division South	40	17	3	1	—		43	18
Queens Park Rangers	1958–59	Third Division	41	20	2	0	—		43	20
Queens Park Rangers	1959–60	Third Division	37	6	3	2	—		40	8
Queens Park Rangers	1960–61	Third Division	26	4	1	1	0	0	27	5
Queens Park Rangers	Total		201	62	11	5	0	0	212	67
Port Vale	1961–62	Third Division	42	16	6	4	1	0	49	20
Port Vale	1962–63	Third Division	10	2	0	0	1	0	11	2
Port Vale	Total		52	18	6	4	2	0	60	22
Millwall	1962–63	Third Division	10	1	0	0	0	0	10	1
Oxford United	1963–64	Fourth Division	30	12	6	2	1	0	37	14
Oxford United	1964–65	Fourth Division	4	2	0	0	1	0	5	2
Oxford United	Total		34	14	6	2	2	0	42	16
Colchester United	1964–65	Third Division	33	12	3	0	0	0	36	12
Career total			330	107	26	11	4	0	360	118
