= Pat Woods (footballer) =

English footballer

Personal information
- Full name: Patrick James Woods
- Date of birth: 29 April 1933
- Place of birth: Islington, London, England
- Date of death: 14 August 2012 (aged 79)
- Place of death: Nambucca Heads, Australia
- Position: Defender

Youth career
- 1948–1950: Queens Park Rangers

Senior career*
Years	Team	Apps	(Gls)
1950–1961	Queens Park Rangers	304	(15)
1961–1962	Hellenic (Brisbane)		
1963	South Coast United	17	(2)
1963–1964	Colchester United	36	(0)
1964–1966	South Coast United	61	(3)
1967–1969	Melita Eagles		
- * Club domestic league appearances and goals

Patrick James "Pat" Woods (29 April 1933 – 14 August 2012) was an English footballer who played over 300 matches for Queens Park Rangers and spent one season at Colchester United in the Football League. He scored 15 goals playing as a defender.

He also spent a significant period playing in Australia with clubs Hellenic in Brisbane and South Coast United, Melita Eagles and Western Suburbs in the highest tier of football in Australia, the NSW First Division.

== Playing career ==
=== Queens Park Rangers ===
Born in London, Woods spent his youth career with Queens Park Rangers F.C. before signing a senior contract in 1950. He made his senior debut for the club on 3 January 1953 in a 2–0 defeat away against Coventry City. This was his only match for the entire 1952–53 season. He then continued to make more appearances the following year before becoming an integral member of the team, playing in over 30 matches per season from 1954 before eventually leaving the club in 1961. Overall, he played 304 league matches, scoring 15 goals for the club.

=== Hellenic (Brisbane) ===
He moved to Australia in 1961, where he joined Hellenic in Brisbane, spending two seasons with the club. In this period, Woods impressed selectors of the Queensland Federation, playing in the end of season's representative matches.

=== South Coast United ===
Woods fine form earned him a transfer to the stronger Sydney competition, the NSW First Division, which at the time was the highest level of football in Australia. Woods signed for South Coast United and instantly became a key member of the playing squad. He left the club after 17 rounds, missing out on the club's first grand final title. However he contributed significantly to team throughout the season, earning a spot in the league's team of the season.

=== Colchester United ===
Woods returned to England, signing for Colchester United F.C. for the 1963–64 Football League season. He made his debut in the opening round in a 4–1 win over Barnsley F.C. and continued to be regular member of the first team. Departing the club before the close of the season, he played in 36 league matches with his final game the Round 39 fixture against Bristol City F.C. on the 28th of March.

=== South Coast United ===
Woods returned to the Woonona club in April 1964, debuting in Round 4 of the season. Woods played in all future matches of the premiership season including the finals series and also in the club's only Australia Cup match. His contribution earned him runner-up in the player of the year award.

In the 1965 season, Woods had a magnificent campaign for the club, helping the team to its second NSW First Division premiership. Unfortunately, the club lost in the preliminary finals and were unable to secure a second grand final title.

With a large turnover of the playing squad that won the premiership the previous season, the expectations weren't high at the club. Still, as a senior member of the team, Woods played in 21 matches for the season, including an unexpected three finals matches.

=== Melita Eagles ===
Woods joined promotion hopefuls, Melita Eagles for the 1967 NSW First Division season, playing in the clubs inaugural First Division match. Woods was one of four players to participate in all 22 fixtures for the season, scoring 3 goals. He also played in four of the five Ampol Cup matches.

== Career statistics ==
=== Club ===
Appearances and goals by club, season and competition
Club	Season	League			National cup (Note: Includes FA Cup and Australia Cup)		League Cup (Note: Includes Ampol Cup (NSWSF))		Other (Note: Includes NSW Federation Cup)		Total	
Club	Season	Division	Apps	Goals	Apps	Goals	Apps	Goals	Apps	Goals	Apps	Goals
Queens Park Rangers F.C.	1952–53	Football League Third Division South	1	0	–	—	–		–		1	0
Queens Park Rangers F.C.	1953–54	Football League Third Division South	23	1	3	0	–		–		26	1
Queens Park Rangers F.C.	1954–55	Football League Third Division South	32	0	3	0	–		–		35	0
Queens Park Rangers F.C.	1955–56	Football League Third Division South	38	0	2	0	–		–		40	0
Queens Park Rangers F.C.	1956–57	Football League Third Division South	45	0	3	0	2	1	–		50	1
Queens Park Rangers F.C.	1957–58	Football League Third Division South	44	6	3	0	2	0	–		49	6
Queens Park Rangers F.C.	1958–59	Football League Third Division	44	0	2	0	1	0	–		47	0
Queens Park Rangers F.C.	1959–60	Football League Third Division	46	3	3	0	1	0	–		50	3
Queens Park Rangers F.C.	1960–61	Football League Third Division	33	5	2	0	0	0	–		35	5
Queens Park Rangers F.C.	Total		304	15	21	0	6	1	–		331	16
Hellenic SC (Brisbane)	1961	Brisbane League	?	?	–		–		–		?	?
Hellenic SC (Brisbane)	1962	Brisbane League	?	?	–		–		–		?	?
Hellenic SC (Brisbane)	Total											
South Coast United	1963	NSW First Division	17	2	–		1	0	–		18	2
Colchester United F.C.	1963–64	Football League Third Division	36	0	2	0	3	0	–		41	0
South Coast United	1964	NSW First Division	19+2	1	1	0	–		–		22	1
South Coast United	1965	NSW First Division	17+2	1	–		2	0	2 (Note: Appearance(s) in NSW Federation Cup)	2	23	3
South Coast United	1966	NSW First Division	18+3	1	2	0	4	0	2	0	29	1
South Coast United	South Coast United Total		78	5	3	0	7	0	4	2	91	7

== Honours ==
=== South Coast United ===
- NSW First Division Premiership: 1965
- NSW First Division Championship: 1963 (Note: Did not participate in the Grand Final but was a significant member of the team throughout the season)

=== Individual ===
- NSW First Division Team of the Season: 1963
