= Ian Allen (footballer) =

Scottish footballer

Personal information
- Full name: John Craig Allen
- Date of birth: 27 January 1932
- Place of birth: Johnstone, Scotland
- Date of death: 11 November 2018 (aged 86)
- Place of death: Poole, England
- Position: Winger

Senior career*
| Years | Team | Apps | (Gls) |
- Beith
| 1953–1954 | Queens Park Rangers | 1 | (0) |
| 1954–1956 | Bournemouth & Boscombe Athletic | 52 | (11) |
| 1957–1963 | Salisbury | | (43) |
- Welton Rovers
| Total | | 53 | (11) |
- * Club domestic league appearances and goals

John Craig "Ian" Allen (27 January 1932 – 11 November 2018) was a Scottish footballer who played in the Football League for Queens Park Rangers and Bournemouth & Boscombe Athletic. He later played in non-league football at Salisbury and Welton Rovers.
