= Tony Richardson (footballer, born 1932) =

English footballer (born 1932)

Personal information
- Full name: Anthony Joseph Richardson
- Date of birth: 7 January 1932 (age 94)
- Place of birth: Southwark, England
- Position: Full back

Senior career*
Years	Team	Apps	(Gls)
- Slough Sports Club
1951–1952	Queens Park Rangers	2	(0)
- * Club domestic league appearances and goals

Anthony Joseph Richardson (born 7 January 1932) is an English former professional footballer who played as a full back.

== Career ==
Born in Southwark, Richardson played for Slough Sports Club and Queens Park Rangers.
