= Ken Whitfield =

English footballer

Personal information
- Full name: Ken Whitfield
- Date of birth: 24 March 1930
- Place of birth: Spennymoor, England
- Date of death: 1995 (aged 64–65)
- Position: Centre half

Youth career
- Shildon

Senior career*
| Years | Team | Apps | (Gls) |
| 1951–1952 | Wolverhampton Wanderers | 9 | (3) |
| 1952–1954 | Manchester City | 13 | (3) |
| 1954–1959 | Brighton & Hove Albion | 175 | (4) |
| 1959–1961 | Queens Park Rangers | 19 | (3) |
| Total | | 216 | (13) |

Managerial career
- Bideford (player/manager)
- * Club domestic league appearances and goals

Ken Whitfield (1930 – 1995) was a footballer who played as a centre half in the Football League for Wolverhampton Wanderers, Manchester City, Brighton & Hove Albion and Queens Park Rangers.
