= Harry Gilberg =

English footballer

Personal information
- Date of birth: 29 June 1923
- Place of birth: Tottenham, England
- Date of death: 16 September 1994 (aged 71)
- Place of death: Torquay, England
- Height: 5 ft 8 in (1.73 m)
- Position: Inside forward

Youth career
- Tottenham Hotspur

Senior career*
Years	Team	Apps	(Gls)
1946–1951	Tottenham Hotspur	2	(0)
1951–1952	Queens Park Rangers	66	(12)
1952–1956	Brighton & Hove Albion	67	(3)
Total		135	(15)
- * Club domestic league appearances and goals

Harry Gilberg (26 June 1923 – 16 September 1994) was an English professional footballer who played as an inside forward. He made 135 league appearances in English football between 1946 and 1956, playing for three clubs.

== Career ==
Born in Tottenham, Gilberg was Jewish. He made 135 appearances in the Football League for Tottenham Hotspur, Queens Park Rangers and Brighton & Hove Albion.
