= Geoff Taylor (footballer) =

English footballer (1923–2007)

Personal information
- Full name: Geoffrey Arthur Taylor
- Date of birth: 22 January 1923
- Place of birth: Kessingland, England
- Date of death: 20 July 2007 (aged 84)
- Place of death: Germany
- Position: Winger

Youth career
- CNSOBU

Senior career*
Years	Team	Apps	(Gls)
1946–1947	Norwich City	1	(0)
1947	Reading	1	(0)
1947–	Lincoln City	1	(0)
–1948	Rennes		
1948–1949	Brighton & Hove Albion	2	(0)
1949–1951	Rennes		
1951–1952	Bristol Rovers	3	(0)
1952–1953	SC Brühl		
1953–1954	Queens Park Rangers	2	(0)
1954–1955	VfR 07 Kirn		
Total		10	(0)
- * Club domestic league appearances and goals

Geoffrey Arthur Taylor (22 January 1923 – 20 July 2007) was an English professional footballer who played as a winger.

== Career ==
Born in Kessingland, Taylor played in England, France, Switzerland and Germany for CNSOBU, Norwich City, Reading, Lincoln City, Brighton & Hove Albion, Rennes, Bristol Rovers, SC Brühl, Queens Park Rangers and VfR 07 Kirn.

== Career statistics ==
Appearances and goals by club, season and competition
Club	Season	League			National Cup		Total	
Club	Season	Division	Apps	Goals	Apps	Goals	Apps	Goals
Lincoln City	1947–48	Third Division North	1	0	0	0	1	0
Queens Park Rangers	1953–54	Third Division South	2	0	0	0	2	0
Career total			3	0	0	0	3	0
