= Billy Waugh (footballer) =

Scottish footballer

Personal information
- Full name: William Lindsay Waugh
- Date of birth: 27 November 1921
- Place of birth: Edinburgh, Scotland
- Date of death: 26 March 2009 (aged 87)
- Place of death: Felixstowe, England
- Height: 5 ft 6 in (1.68 m)
- Position: Winger

Youth career
- –1938: Meadowbank Thistle
- 1938–1939: Ratho Amateurs

Senior career*
Years	Team	Apps	(Gls)
1939–1940	Rosewell Rosedale		
1939	→ Heart of Midlothian (trial)		
1940–1944	Bathgate Thistle		
1944–1950	Luton Town	135	(9)
1950–1953	Queens Park Rangers	77	(6)
1953–1954	Bournemouth & Boscombe Athletic	18	(3)
1954–1955	Chelmsford City	2	(0)
1955–1956	Bedford Town		
1956–1957	Ashford Town	5	(1)
- March Town United
- * Club domestic league appearances and goals

William Lindsay Waugh (27 November 1921 — 26 March 2009) was a Scottish footballer who played as a winger. He made a total of 230 appearances in the English Football League playing for Luton Town, Queens Park Rangers and Bournemouth & Boscombe Athletic.

== Career ==
At the start of his career Waugh played in his native Scotland for the Edinburgh Juvenile club Meadowbank Thistle. In 1938 whilst only 16 years of age he was with Ratho Amateurs of the Lothian Amateur League. By March 1939 he had signed with Midlothian Junior League club Rosewell Rosedale and in the following August Waugh played in a trial with Scottish Football League club Heart of Midlothian. In 1940 he had moved to Midlothian Junior club Bathgate Thistle.

In August 1944 whilst with the Royal Air Force Waugh joined English club Luton Town: in 1945 the club played in the wartime Football League South before resuming their pre-war position in the Football League Second Division for the 1946–47 season. During his time with Luton he made 135 Football League appearances, scoring nine times. In the summer of 1950 Waugh was transferred for a reported fee of £6,000 to fellow Second Division club Queens Park Rangers. Over the course of three seasons with the club, after the second of which they were relegated to the Football League Third Division South, he scored six times playing in 77 league games. In July 1953 Waugh joined Bournemouth & Boscombe Athletic, also of the Third Division South, for a reported four figure fee. During his single season with the club he played in eighteen matches scoring three goals – the team finished tied in nineteenth place in the league table – and in May 1954 he was placed on the club's "available for transfer" list.

Waugh then moved to Non-League football signing for Chelmsford City of the Southern Football League. After less than a season there, in March 1955, he signed for Bedford Town also of the Southern league and remained with them until the end of the 1955–56 campaign. During the next season Waugh was with Kent League club Ashford Town before signing, in the summer of 1957, with March Town United of the Eastern Counties League.

== Personal life ==
Whilst with the non-league clubs Waugh combined playing with a job as an insurance agent. He spent thirty years as general secretary for Electrolux Sports before retiring in 1986. Billy moved from Luton to Felixstowe before dying in 2009.
