= Willie Hurrell =

Scottish footballer

Personal information
- Full name: William Provan Hurrell
- Date of birth: 28 January 1920
- Place of birth: Dundee, Scotland
- Date of death: 24 December 1999 (aged 79)
- Place of death: Lewisham, England
- Position: Inside forward

Youth career
- Coupar Angus Juniors, Stobswell

Senior career*
Years	Team	Apps	(Gls)
1940–1945	Raith Rovers & Chelsea		
1946–1953	Millwall	121	(32)
1953–1954	Queens Park Rangers	6	(1)
1954–1956	Tunbridge Wells United		
1956–????	Chatham Town		
Total		127	(33)
- * Club domestic league appearances and goals

William Provan Hurrell (28 January 1920 – 24 December 1999) born in Dundee, Scotland, is a Scottish footballer who played as an inside forward in the Football League. He left Raith Rovers for a fee of £2,000 to join Millwall in 1946 where he stayed until 1952 before spending one season at Queens Park Rangers. In 1954 he commenced two seasons in Non-League football with Tunbridge Wells United before moving on to Chatham Town.
