= Ray Drinkwater =

English footballer

Personal information
- Date of birth: 18 May 1931
- Place of birth: Jarrow, England
- Date of death: 24 March 2008 (aged 76)

Senior career*
| Years | Team | Apps | (Gls) |
| 1951–1956 | Guildford City | | |
| 1956–1957 | Portsmouth | 8 | (0) |
| 1957–1963 | Queens Park Rangers | 199 | (0) |
| 1963–???? | Bath City | | |
| Total | | 207+ | (0+) |
- * Club domestic league appearances and goals

Ray Drinkwater (18 May 1931 – 24 March 2008) was an English footballer who played in the Football League for Portsmouth and Queens Park Rangers.

Drinkwater was born in Jarrow, County Durham and began his career with Guildford City in 1951. He signed for QPR in 1957 from Portsmouth and made his debut in a 1–1 draw with Coventry City in March 1958. He played 199 league games for QPR.

Ray left QPR in 1963, moving to non-league Bath City.

He died on 24 March 2008, aged 76.
