= Bert Hawkins =

English footballer

Personal information
- Full name: Bertram William Hawkins
- Date of birth: 29 September 1923
- Place of birth: Bristol, England
- Date of death: 21 June 2002 (aged 78)
- Place of death: Bristol, England
- Position: Centre-forward

Senior career*
Years	Team	Apps	(Gls)
1947–1949	Bristol Rovers	0	(0)
1949–1950	Bristol City	8	(4)
1950–1951	Bath City		
1951–1953	West Ham United	34	(16)
1953–1954	Queens Park Rangers	8	(3)
1954–1955	Cheltenham Town		(11)
- * Club domestic league appearances and goals

Bert Hawkins (29 September 1923 – 21 June 2002) was an English professional footballer who played as a centre-forward in the Football League for Bristol City, West Ham United and Queens Park Rangers.

After starting his career at Bristol Rovers, Hawkins joined Bristol City in 1949. He joined Bath City in February 1950, making his Southern League debut against Weymouth, and his home debut on 4 March 1950 against Gloucester City. He was retained for the 1950–51 season, and was signed by West Ham United on 31 August 1951 for £2,750 (with a proportion of the fee going to previous club Bristol City), as a replacement for the injured Bill Robinson. A day later, he scored on his Hammers debut, a 1–1 draw against Hull City. He totalled 15 goals in 32 Second Division appearances for West Ham in the 1951–52 season, and also made three FA Cup appearances for the club.

After sustaining an injury during pre-season, he scored his only other goal for West Ham in a 3–1 home win against Brentford on 1 November 1952, and played one further game in 1952–53 before moving to Queens Park Rangers. He then played for Cheltenham Town during the 1954–55 season.
