= George Powell (footballer) =

English footballer

Personal information
- Full name: George Reginald Powell
- Date of birth: 11 November 1924
- Place of birth: Fulham, England
- Date of death: 19 February 1989 (aged 64)
- Height: 6 ft 1 in (1.85 m)
- Position: Full back

Youth career
- Years: Team
- Fulham
1946-53	Queens Park Rangers	155	
1955	Snowden Colliery		

George Reginald Powell (11 November 1924 – 19 February 1989) was an English footballer, who played for QPR as a right back.

== Early life ==
George Reginald Powell was born Fulham, London on 11 November 1924.

== Career ==
Powell signed for Rangers in 1946 after turning down Arsenal and Fulham. He made his debut in a 2–3 defeat against Reading in November 1947. He was a member of the team that won the Third Division (South) Championship in 1948. In 1948 Sheffield United bid a British record £28,000 by Powell turned the move down to stay in London The same year, 1948, he was captain of QPR when they won the 3rd Division title. He was also Captain of the GB side in the war years. He was the last amateur to play for Fulham first team prior to his signing for QPR Powell played right-back and went on to play 155 league games for Rangers. Powell left Rangers for non-league football in 1953.

== Later life ==
Married to Alice Powell (also known as Morrie) living in Norwich Father of George Alan Powell living in Norwich, who is a former Norfolk County FA manager / coach He died in 1989.

In 2020 George was elected into the Queens Park Rangers FC Hall of Fame.

On 18th September 2025 He was named as the 463rd player to play for Queens Park Rangers with his debut on 08/11/1947
