= John Poppitt =

English footballer

Personal information
- Full name: John Poppitt
- Date of birth: 20 January 1923
- Place of birth: West Sleekburn, England
- Date of death: 12 February 2014 (aged 91)
- Place of death: Derby, England
- Position: Right back

Senior career*
Years	Team	Apps	(Gls)
- West Sleekburn Welfare
1945–1950	Derby County	16	(0)
1950–1954	Queens Park Rangers	106	(0)
1954–1955	Chelmsford City		
1955–1957	Burton Albion		
1957–1958	Banbury Spencer		
1958–1960	Corby Town		
1960–1965	Long Eaton United		
1965–1967	Matlock Town		
- * Club domestic league appearances and goals

John Poppitt (20 January 1923 – 12 February 2014) was an English footballer who played as a right back in The Football League for Derby County and Queens Park Rangers between 1947 and 1954 and also played for several non-League clubs. He made over 100 League appearances for Queens Park Rangers.

== Playing career ==
Born in West Sleekburn, Northumberland, Poppitt played for local club West Sleekburn Welfare before joining Derby County in May 1945, the Second World War having prevented him from signing earlier. Although usually a right back, he made his first team debut for Derby in February 1947 as a centre forward. With Bert Mozley as the regular right back, Poppitt played mainly for the reserve team, but did make 16 Football League appearances for Derby before being transferred to Queens Park Rangers (QPR) in September 1950. He went on to make 106 League appearances for QPR before leaving the club in 1954.

Poppitt went on to have a long career in non-League football, firstly with Chelmsford City, who he joined in July 1954. He later signed for Burton Albion in June 1955, Banbury Spencer in May 1957, Corby Town in June 1958 and Long Eaton United in January 1960. He was also player-coach of Matlock Town for two years from May 1965.

After retiring from football, Poppitt settled in Derby, where he worked for the East Midlands Electricity Board. He died in Derby on 12 February 2014, aged 91.
