= Lew Clayton =

English professional footballer

Personal information
- Full name: Lewis Clayton
- Date of birth: 7 June 1924
- Place of birth: Royston, West Riding of Yorkshire, England
- Date of death: 19 January 2010 (aged 85)
- Place of death: Redcar, England
- Position: Wing half

Senior career*
Years	Team	Apps	(Gls)
1942–1946	Barnsley	0	(0)
1946–1947	Carlisle United	24	(0)
1947–1950	Barnsley	15	(0)
1950–1955	Queens Park Rangers	91	(0)
1955–1957	Bournemouth and Boscombe Athletic	40	(1)
1957–1959	Swindon Town	35	(2)
1959–?	Wisbech Town		

Managerial career
- 1973: Cardiff City (caretaker)
- * Club domestic league appearances and goals

Lewis Clayton (7 June 1924 – 19 January 2010) was an English professional footballer who played as a wing half. He made over 150 appearances in The Football League during spells with Barnsley, Carlisle United, Queens Park Rangers, Bournemouth and Boscombe Athletic and Swindon Town.

After retiring from playing, he worked for several Football League sides in various roles, including a one-match spell as caretaker-manager of Cardiff City in November 1973.

== Playing career ==
Born in Royston, West Riding of Yorkshire, Clayton began playing football for Barnsley during the Second World War. He worked as a miner during the war on weekdays before playing football on weekends. He left Barnsley to join Carlisle United in March 1946 where he made his league debut before returning to Barnsley the following year. He later played for Queens Park Rangers, Bournemouth and Boscombe Athletic and Swindon Town before moving into non- league football with Wisbech Town.

== Later career ==
After finishing his playing career Clayton remained in football, working in several roles for Cambridge United and Doncaster Rovers. Clayton later worked for Cardiff City and was briefly appointed caretaker-manager of the side following Jimmy Scoular's dismissal in November 1973. He took charge of a single match, a 2–0 defeat to Millwall, before Frank O'Farrell was appointed. He then moved to Middlesbrough FC as physio under John Neal in 1977

== Personal life ==
Clayton retired to the village of Redcar with his wife Joyce. He had one daughter Christine and one granddaughter Sarah. He died on 19 January 2010.

== Managerial statistics ==
Team	Country	From	To	Record				
Team	Country	From	To	G	W	D	L	Win %
Cardiff City (caretaker)	(Wales)	7 November 1973	13 November 1973	1	0	0	1	0
Total				1	0	0	1	0
