= Willie Clark (footballer, born 1932) =

Scottish footballer

Personal information
- Full name: William Clark
- Date of birth: 25 February 1932
- Place of birth: Larkhall, Scotland
- Date of death: 27 July 2006 (aged 74)
- Place of death: Aberdeen, Scotland
- Position: Centre forward

Youth career
- Petershill

Senior career*
Years	Team	Apps	(Gls)
1953	Arbroath (trialist)	1	(1)
1953–1956	Queens Park Rangers	95	(32)
1956–1957	Berwick Rangers	20	(6)
- Cheltenham Town
Total		116	(39)
- * Club domestic league appearances and goals

William Clark (25 February 1932 – 27 July 2006) was a Scottish footballer, who played in the Scottish League for Arbroath and Berwick Rangers and in the English Football League for Queens Park Rangers.
