= Stan Gullan =

Scottish footballer

Personal information
- Full name: Stanley Knox Gullan
- Date of birth: 26 January 1926
- Place of birth: Edinburgh, Scotland
- Date of death: 29 June 1999 (aged 73)
- Place of death: Aberdeen, Scotland
- Position: Goalkeeper

Senior career*
Years	Team	Apps	(Gls)
1944–1947	Dumbarton	17	(0)
1947–1950	Clyde	46	(0)
1950–1955	Queens Park Rangers	48	(0)
1955–1956	Tunbridge Wells	36	(0)
1956–1957	Berwick Rangers	3	(0)
1957	Third Lanark	1	(0)
1957–1959	Montrose	34	(0)
1959–1960	Stenhousemuir	34	(0)
Total		176	(0)
- * Club domestic league appearances and goals

Stanley Knox Gullan (26 January 1926 – 29 June 1999) was a Scottish footballer, who played as a goalkeeper for Dumbarton, Clyde, Queens Park Rangers, Tunbridge Wells, Berwick Rangers, Third Lanark, Montrose and Stenhousemuir. Gullan played in the 1949 Scottish Cup Final for Clyde.
