= Bill Spence (footballer) =

English footballer

Personal information
- Full name: William Spence
- Date of birth: 10 January 1926
- Place of birth: Hartlepool, England
- Date of death: March 1st 1993
- Height: 5 ft 10 in (1.78 m)
- Position: Centre half

Senior career*
Years	Team	Apps	(Gls)
1947-1951	Portsmouth	19	
1951-1955	QPR	50	
- * Club domestic league appearances and goals

William Spence (1926-1993) was an English footballer. He was a defender who played for Queens Park Rangers and Portsmouth F.C. He retired through injury in 1955.

On 18th September 2025 He was named as the 494th player to play for Queens Park Rangers with his debut on 25/12/1951
