= Bert Addinall =

English footballer (1921–2005)

Personal information
- Full name: Albert William Addinall
- Date of birth: 30 January 1921
- Place of birth: Marylebone, London, England
- Date of death: May 2005 (aged 84)
- Place of death: Surrey, England
- Position: Centre forward

Senior career*
Years	Team	Apps	(Gls)
- British Oxygen
1943–1953	Queens Park Rangers	150	(59)
1953–1954	Brighton & Hove Albion	60	(31)
1954–1955	Crystal Palace	12	(2)
- Snowdown CW
- * Club domestic league appearances and goals

Albert William Addinall (30 January 1921 – May 2005) was an English professional footballer. He scored 92 goals from 222 games in the Football League playing for Queens Park Rangers, Brighton & Hove Albion and Crystal Palace as a centre forward.

== Career ==
Addinall was born in Marylebone, London. He joined Queens Park Rangers in April 1945 from British Oxygen. His league debut came in September 1946 in the 3–0 win against AFC Bournemouth and he went on to play 150 league games scoring 59 goals.

Addinall left QPR for Brighton & Hove Albion in January 1953, where he was again a regular goalscorer. He moved to Crystal Palace in July 1954, playing twelve league games, before ending his league career. He went on to play non-League football for Snowdown Colliery Welfare. Addinall died in May 2005.
