= Brian Nicholas =

Welsh footballer (1933–2021)

Personal information
- Full name: Charles Brian Nicholas
- Date of birth: 20 April 1933
- Place of birth: Aberdare, Wales
- Date of death: October 2021 (aged 88)
- Place of death: Coventry, England
- Position: Wing half

Youth career
- Queens Park Rangers

Senior career*
| Years | Team | Apps | (Gls) |
| 1948–1955 | Queens Park Rangers | 113 | (2) |
| 1955–1957 | Chelsea | 26 | (1) |
| 1957–1962 | Coventry City | 113 | (0) |
- Rugby Town
| Total | | 252 | (3) |
- * Club domestic league appearances and goals

Charles Brian Nicholas (20 April 1933 – October 2021) was a Welsh professional footballer, who played as a wing half.

== Career ==
Born in Aberdare, Nicholas played for Queens Park Rangers, Chelsea, Coventry City and Rugby Town.

He died in Coventry in October 2021, at the age of 88.
