= Ernie Shepherd (footballer) =

English footballer (1919–2001)

Personal information
- Full name: Ernest Shepherd
- Date of birth: 14 August 1919
- Place of birth: Wombwell, England
- Date of death: 2001 (aged 81–82)
- Place of death: Eastwood, England
- Position: Outside left

Youth career
- Dearne Valley Schools
- Bradford City

Senior career*
Years	Team	Apps	(Gls)
- Bradford Rovers
1938–1948	Fulham	72	(13)
1948–1949	West Bromwich Albion	4	(0)
1949–1950	Hull City	15	(3)
1950–1957	Queens Park Rangers	219	(51)

Managerial career
- 1967–1969: Southend United
- 1971–1972: Pegasus Athletic
- * Club domestic league appearances and goals

Ernest Shepherd (14 August 1919 – 2001) was an English footballer who played in the Football League as an outside left for Fulham, West Bromwich Albion, Hull City and Queens Park Rangers. He went on to manage Southend United.

Shepherd was born in Wombwell, near Barnsley, in Yorkshire. He joined Fulham in April 1938, following a successful trial in September 1937, before signing for West Bromwich Albion in December 1948, moving on again only after only three months to Hull City. He joined Queens Park Rangers in 1950, and made his debut in August that year against Chesterfield. Shepherd played 219 league games for QPR scoring 51 goals before retiring from playing in 1957.

He went on to coach both in England, for Hastings United and Bradford Park Avenue, and abroad, in Iceland and for Al-Wasl in the United Arab Emirates. From 1967 to 1969 was manager of Southend United.

Shepherd died in Eastwood, Essex, in 2001.
