= Jack Taylor (footballer, born 1914) =

English footballer and manager

Personal information
- Full name: John Taylor
- Date of birth: 15 February 1914
- Place of birth: Barnsley, England
- Date of death: 22 February 1978 (aged 64)
- Place of death: Barnsley, England
- Position: Full-back

Youth career
- Worborough Bridge

Senior career*
Years	Team	Apps	(Gls)
1931–1938	Wolverhampton Wanderers	79	(0)
1938–1947	Norwich City	50	(0)
1947–1950	Hull City	72	(0)

Managerial career
- 1950–1952: Weymouth (player-manager)
- 1952–1959: Queens Park Rangers
- 1959–1961: Leeds United
- * Club domestic league appearances and goals

John Taylor (15 February 1914 – 22 February 1978) was an English footballer who became a manager.

== Career ==
Taylor was a full-back who started his playing career with Wolverhampton Wanderers in 1931. He made his senior debut on 1 February 1936 in a 0–5 loss at Brentford. He became a first team regular after Cecil Shaw left in November 1936 and was a virtual ever-present for the next season-and-a-half. His only full season in the team saw the club miss out on the league title by a single point.

He was transferred to Norwich City in Summer 1938, and replaced in the Wolves side by his younger brother Frank. He managed one full season at Carrow Road before the suspension of league football due to World War II. After guesting for Barnsley and Watford during the war, he joined Hull City in July 1947.

Hull were at the time were managed by former Sunderland and England inside-forward, Raich Carter, when Taylor was part of the side that won the Third Division North championship in 1948-49.

In May 1950, he dropped into the non-league to become player-manager of Weymouth. He returned to the Football League in June 1952, when he replaced Dave Mangnall at Queens Park Rangers who had been recently relegated from the Second Division. Under Taylor they never managed to finish higher in the league than 10th. In addition to this they suffered two humiliating FA Cup defeats to non-league opposition, including a 6–1 thrashing by Hereford United in the 2nd round in December 1957. He was asked to manage the Third Division South representative team in October 1957.

Taylor left QPR in May 1959 to take over at Leeds United but within a year Leeds were relegated to the Second Division and he resigned in March 1961 to be succeeded by Don Revie. He never managed in league football again.

He died in his home town of Barnsley on 22 February 1978.

Sporting positions
Preceded by Tom Smalley	Norwich City Captain; 1946	Succeeded by Norman Low
