= Pat Kerrins =

English footballer (1935–2021)

Personal information
- Full name: Patrick Michael Kerrins
- Date of birth: 13 September 1936
- Place of birth: Fulham, London, England
- Date of death: 8 September 2021 (aged 84)
- Place of death: London, England
- Position: Outside left

Youth career
- 19xx–1953: Queens Park Rangers

Senior career*
Years	Team	Apps	(Gls)
1953–1960	Queens Park Rangers	146	(30)
1960–1961	Crystal Palace	5	(0)
1961–1962	Southend United	11	(0)
1962–19xx	Romford		
- * Club domestic league appearances and goals

Patrick Michael Kerrins (13 September 1936 – 8 September 2021) was an English footballer who played in the Football League as an outside left for Queens Park Rangers, Crystal Palace and Southend United.

Kerrins came through the youth ranks at Queens Park Rangers, turned professional in December 1953 and made his debut in February 1954 in a goalless draw against Exeter City. He went on to play 146 league games for Rangers, scoring 30 league goals, then transferred to Crystal Palace in 1960 and later had spells at Southend United and non-league Romford.

Kerrins died in London on 8 September 2021, aged 84.
