= George Petchey =

English footballer and manager (1931–2019)

Personal information
- Date of birth: 24 June 1931
- Place of birth: Whitechapel, London, England
- Date of death: 23 December 2019 (aged 88)
- Position: Wing half

Youth career
- 1948–1952: West Ham United

Senior career*
Years	Team	Apps	(Gls)
1952–1953	West Ham United	2	(0)
1953–1960	Queens Park Rangers	255	(22)
1960–1965	Crystal Palace	143	(12)

Managerial career
- 1971–1977: Orient
- 1978–1980: Millwall
- * Club domestic league appearances and goals

George W. Petchey (24 June 1931 – 23 December 2019) was an English footballer and manager who made 400 appearances in the Football League for West Ham United, Queens Park Rangers and Crystal Palace, playing at wing half (defensive midfield). He was well known for being a hard tackling, midfield general or enforcer, whilst also being one of the first of his generation to play an attractive, keep ball style of play at the same time.

== Playing career ==
Petchey was born in Whitechapel, London. He joined West Ham in 1948 and transferred to QPR in 1953. He made his Rangers debut against Brighton in August 1953 and over the next seven seasons, played 255 league games for Rangers scoring 22 goals.

Petchey signed for Crystal Palace in May 1960. He went on to play 143 league games for Palace scoring 12 goals. In season 1960–61, he was ever present as Palace achieved promotion. Subsequently, he suffered a serious eye injury which ultimately hastened his retirement. He returned from the injury in a home FA Cup quarter final tie against Leeds United, in March 1965, and made one further appearance, in the league, the following month. He retired to become coach at Crystal Palace and later manager at Orient, Millwall and Brighton, whilst also having roles at Chelsea. Following these stints as manager he then became first team coach at Brighton, moving on to manager whilst at the Goldstone ground in Hove. Petchey was well known for being an excellent coach of young players (he was the first English coach to get all the Uefa coaching badges), demonstrated when bringing through the ranks, Laurie Cunningham at Leyton Orient, who went on to play for Real Madrid. His passion for bringing through young talent took him to become chief scout at Newcastle United in the late 1990s under Ruud Gullit, bringing in players such as Kieron Dyer from Ipswich Town. Following this, he became one of the first team coaches under Sir Bobby Robson in the successful early 2000s before retirement.

== Personal life ==
Petchey died on 23 December 2019 aged 88.
