= Peter Angell =

English footballer

Personal information
- Full name: Peter Angell
- Date of birth: 22 February 1932
- Place of birth: Dublin, Ireland
- Date of death: 18 July 1979 (aged 47)
- Position: Left winger

Senior career*
Years	Team	Apps	(Gls)
1953–1953	Slough Town	18	(2)
1953–1963	Queens Park Rangers	417	(37)
- * Club domestic league appearances and goals

Peter Angell (22 February 1932 – 18 July 1979) was a professional footballer. He played for Queens Park Rangers and Millwall, at wing half.

== Playing career ==
Angell was a left-winger with Slough Townwhere he had made his debut for the Rebels in January 1953 and featured in that year's run to the quarter final of the FA Amateur Cup. Charlton Athletic were first interested in him. After a few games at the Valley in the London Mid-Week League, however, he was allowed to go to Queens Park Rangers, where he signed professional in June 1953. Angell made his debut for QPR in September 1953 in the 2–0 win against Walsall and went on to play 417 league games scoring 37 goals. He retired from playing in July 1963 to coach at Charton Athletic.

== Coaching career ==
In later years he became a highly respected coach, laying the foundations for getting Orient back into the second division after their rapid fall from First Division to the Third in the mid-sixties. He was assistant manager for both of Jimmy Bloomfield's spells as manager and also during the reign of George Petchey. During Angell's time at Orient, the club won the 1970 third division championship just a year after surviving relegation on the final day of the season with a 4–0 at home to Shrewsbury. The O's became established in the old second division and enjoyed two cup runs, to the quarter-finals in 1972 and the semis in 1978. On both occasions Orient defeated Chelsea en route and were finally eliminated by Arsenal.

Angell died suddenly and unexpectedly of a massive heart attack during a football training run in Epping Forest in July 1979.
