= Bobby Cameron (footballer, born 1932) =

Scottish footballer (1932–2022)

Personal information
- Full name: Robert Cameron
- Date of birth: 23 November 1932
- Place of birth: Greenock, Scotland
- Date of death: 21 February 2022 (aged 89)
- Place of death: Newcastle, Australia
- Position: Inside forward

Senior career*
Years	Team	Apps	(Gls)
1950–1959	Queens Park Rangers	256	(59)
1959–1962	Leeds United	58	(9)
1962–1963	Gravesend and Northfleet		
1963–1964	Southend United	3	(0)
Total		317	(68)
- * Club domestic league appearances and goals

Robert Cameron (23 November 1932 – 21 February 2022) was a Scottish professional footballer who played for Queens Park Rangers, Leeds United and Southend United.

== Playing career ==
Cameron was a Scottish schoolboy international and joined Queens Park Rangers, where he scored 59 goals in 256 league appearances between 1950–51 and 1958–59. He was signed from Port Glasgow Rovers. He joined Leeds United in 1959 at a time when Leeds were struggling and were then relegated from the First Division at the end of the 1959–60 season. Cameron scored nine goals in 58 league appearances for Leeds, but his playing time became scarcer during the 1961–62 season and he joined non-league club Gravesend and Northfleet at the end of the season. He returned to the Football League with Southend United in October 1963.

Cameron was an attacking player with a cheerful disposition but casual attitude who would seek the ball so to get it forward.

== Death ==
Cameron died in Newcastle, Australia on 21 February 2022, at the age of 89.

== Sources ==
- Mourant, Andrew (1992). Leeds United: Player by Player. Guinness Publishing Ltd. p. 14. ISBN 0-85112-568-9.
