= Tony Ingham =

English footballer

Personal information
- Date of birth: 18 February 1925
- Place of birth: Harrogate, England
- Date of death: 21 April 2010 (aged 85)
- Position: Defender

Senior career*
| Years | Team | Apps | (Gls) |
| 1939–1947 | Harrogate Town | | |
| 1947–1950 | Leeds United | 3 | (0) |
| 1950–1963 | Queens Park Rangers | 514 | (3) |
- * Club domestic league appearances and goals

Anthony Ingham (18 February 1925 – 21 April 2010) was an English professional footballer who played more than 500 games in the Football League as a defender for Leeds United and Queens Park Rangers. He holds the appearance record for QPR, having played 548 first-team games in senior competitions.

== Career ==
During the Second World War Ingham served in the Royal Navy. He also completed an electrical apprenticeship while playing part-time for Harrogate Town, where he made his debut in 1939/40 at the age of 14. He signed for Leeds United in the summer of 1947, and made his League debut for the club in October of the same year in a 3–2 defeat at West Bromwich Albion. However he played only rarely for The Whites, and joined Queens Park Rangers in June 1950 for a fee of £5,000.

He made his debut against Doncaster Rovers in November 1950, and retired 13 years later having made a club record 548 appearances in all senior competitions, 514 in the League. After retiring as a player in May 1963, he held various positions with QPR and went on to become a director of the club. A function room at Loftus Road is named in Ingham's honour.

== Death ==
On 21 April 2010, Tony Ingham died of an illness at the age of 85.
