= List of Queens Park Rangers F.C. seasons =

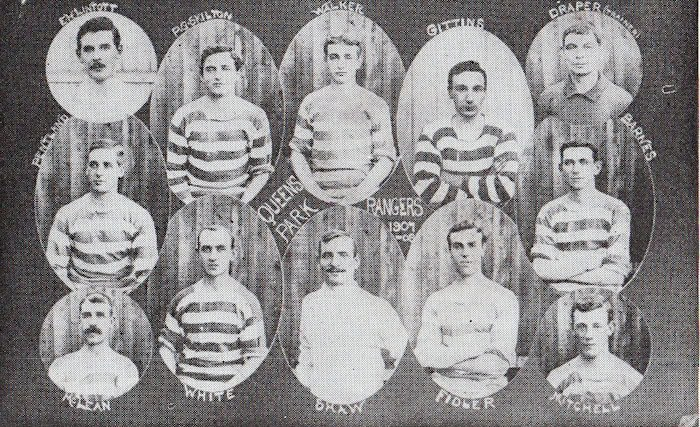
The Queens Park Rangers team from the 1907–08 season who won the Southern League for the first time and competed in the first Charity Shield match

Queens Park Rangers Football Club, also known as QPR, is an English association football club based in White City, London. The club originated from a merger between St Jude's and Christchurch Rangers in 1886, both of whom were founded in 1882. Initially an amateur side who played in the West London League and the second division of the London League, QPR joined the Southern Football League when they turned professional in 1898. After they won the league during the 1907–08 season, they participated in the first Charity Shield match and lost to Manchester United in a replay.

They joined the Football League Third Division in 1920, and in 1967 became the first Third Division side to win the League Cup. They have won four divisional titles in the English football league system, two in the second tier and two in the third. Their best placed finish in the system was as runners-up in the Football League First Division in the 1975–76 season, while their best achievement in the FA Cup was also as runners-up, in the 1981–82 competition.

QPR League Performances

As of the end of the 2024–25 season, the team have spent 23 seasons in the top tier of the English football league system, 36 in the second and 40 in the third tier. The table details the team's achievements and the top goalscorer in senior first-team competitions from their first professional season in the Southern Football League in the 1899–1900 season to the end of the most recently completed season. It includes the tournaments that QPR participated in during the First and Second World Wars, which are not counted against players' official statistics as they were unofficial and considered to be friendlies.

== Key ==
Key to league record:

- Pld – Matches played
- W – Matches won
- D – Matches drawn
- L – Matches lost
- GF – Goals for
- GA – Goals against
- Pts – Points
- Pos – Final position

Key to colours and symbols:

1st or W	Winners
2nd or F	Runners-up
F*	Finalist, but match never completed
↑	Promoted
↓	Relegated
♦	Top league scorer in QPR's division

Key to divisions and tournaments:

- West London Observer Cup – West London Observer Football Challenge Cup
- West London – West London League
- London 2 – London League Division Two
- Southern 1 – Southern League First Division
- Southern 2 – Southern League Second Division
- SP Floodlit Cup – Southern Professional Floodlit Cup
- Western 1A – Western League Division 1A
- Division 1 – Football League First Division
- Division 2 – Football League Second Division
- Division 3 – Football League Third Division
- Division 3S – Football League Third Division South
- Division 3SN – Football League Third Division South (North)
- Division 3SN Cup – Football League Third Division South (North) Cup
- London Com (Prin) – London Combination (Principal)
- London Com (Supp) – London Combination (Supplementary)
- League South 'B' – Wartime League South 'B'
- League South 'D' – Wartime League South 'D'
- Merc CC Trophy – Mercantile Credit Centenary Trophy
- Premier – Premier League
- Championship – EFL Championship
- League One – EFL League One

Key to rounds:

- Grp – Group stage
- QR3 – Third qualifying round
- QR4 – Fourth qualifying round, etc.
- Pre – Preliminary round
- R1 – First round
- R2 – Second round, etc.
- QF(S) – Quarter-final Southern section
- QF – Quarter-final
- SF(S) – Semi-final Southern section
- SF – Semi-final
- F(S) – Final Southern section
- F – Final
- W – Winners

Details for abandoned competitions: the 1938–39 Third Division South Cup and the 1939–40 Football League are shown in italics and appropriately footnoted.

== Seasons ==
Season	Division (Note: Divisions are sorted according to their level within the English football league system at the time.)	Pld	W	D	L	GF	GA	Pts	Pos (Note: In seasons when the club played in more than one league, the column is sorted by the league with the most games, with the exception of the 1939–40 season.)	FA Cup (Note: Beginning with the 1925–26 season, the FA Cup was structured so that the third round proper contained 64 teams. Prior to that date, the structure had varied, so rounds are not directly comparable to the round of the same name after 1925.)	League Cup (Note: The Football League Cup competition started in the 1960–61 season.)	Competition	Result	Player(s)	Goals
Season	League									FA Cup	League Cup	Other		Top scorer(s) (Note: Includes goals scored in all first-team competitions as listed in this table, including wartime competitions.)	
1890–91	—	—	—	—	—	—	—	—	—	—	—	West London Observer Cup London Senior Cup West London Challenge Cup	SF R2 SF	—	—
1891–92	—	—	—	—	—	—	—	—	—	—	—	West London Observer Cup	R2	—	—
1892–93	West London	—	—	—	—	—	—	16	6th	—	—	West London Observer Cup	W	—	—
1893–94	—	—	—	—	—	—	—	—	—	—	—	West London Observer Cup	F* (Note: QPR reached the final of the tournament, but their opponents refused to play the match.)	—	—
1894–95	—	—	—	—	—	—	—	—	—	—	—	FA Amateur Cup Middlesex Challenge Cup	QR3 R1	—	—
1895–96	—	—	—	—	—	—	—	—	—	QR1	—	FA Amateur Cup	QR3	—	—
1896–97	London 2	16	10	1	5	31	14	21	3rd	QR1	—	—	—	—	—
1897–98	London 2	—	—	—	—	—	—	—	Withdrew	QR3	—	London Senior Cup London Charity Cup	R4 SF	—	—
1898–99	West London	12	10	2	0	22	2	22	1st	Pre	—	London Charity Cup	R1	—	—
1899–1900	Southern 1	28	12	2	14	49	57	26	8th	R2	—	—	—	Frank Bedingfield	21
1900–01	Southern 1 Western 1A	28 16	11 7	4 4	13 5	43 39	48 25	26 18	8th 4th	QR5	—	—	—	Percy Humphreys	12
1901–02	Southern 1 Western 1A	30 16	8 5	7 1	15 10	34 17	56 43	23 11	12th 8th	QR5	—	—	—	Harry Millar	12
1902–03	Southern 1 Western 1A	30 16	11 6	6 2	13 8	34 18	42 43	28 14	9th 7th	QR3	—	—	—	John Blackwood	10
1903–04	Southern 1 Western 1A	34 16	15 5	11 5	08 6	53 15	37 21	41 15	5th 6th	QR3	—	—	—	John Blackwood	20
1904–05	Southern 1 Western 1A	34 20	14 6	8 3	12 11	51 27	46 45	36 15	7th 11th	QR6	—	SP Floodlit Cup	R2	Fred Bevan	20
1905–06	Southern 1 Western 1A	34 20	12 11	7 4	15 5	58 33	44 27	31 26	13th 1st	R1	—	SP Floodlit Cup	R1	Fred Ryder	15
1906–07	Southern 1 Western 1A	38 10	21 5	10 1	17 4	47 17	55 11	32 11	18th 2nd	R1	—	SP Floodlit Cup	SF	Sidney Sugden	9
1907–08	Southern 1 Western 1A	38 12	21 5	9 1	8 6	82 20	57 23	51 11	1st 5th	R2	—	FA Charity Shield	F	Alfred Gittens Arthur Walker	16
1908–09	Southern 1 Western 1A	40 12	12 6	12 1	16 5	52 28	50 24	36 13	15th 2nd	R1	—	London Challenge Cup	R1	Billy Barnes	10
1909–10	Southern 1	42	19	13	10	56	47	51	3rd	QF	—	London Challenge Cup	SF	William Steer	27
1910–11	Southern 1	38	13	14	11	52	41	40	6th	R1	—	London Challenge Cup SP Floodlit Cup	R1 SF	Bob Browning	18
1911–12	Southern 1	38	21	11	6	59	35	53	1st	R1	—	FA Charity Shield London Challenge Cup SP Floodlit Cup	F R1 R2	Dan Mckie Edward Revill	16
1912–13	Southern 1	38	18	10	10	46	35	46	6th	R2	—	London Challenge Cup SP Floodlit Cup	R2 W	James Birch	18
1913–14	Southern 1	38	16	9	13	45	43	41	8th	QF	—	London Challenge Cup SP Floodlit Cup	R1 R2	James Birch	20
1914–15	Southern 1	38	13	12	13	55	56	38	12th	R3	—	London Challenge Cup SP Floodlit Cup	R2 R1	James Birch	17
1915–16	London Com (Prin) London Com (Supp)	22 14	8 2	3 5	11 7	27 14	41 37	19 9	8th 13th	—	—	—	—	Howard Humphries	9
1916–17	London Com (Prin)	39	10	9	20	48	86	29	10th	—	—	—	—	George Dale Victor Hassan Walter Lawrence	10
1917–18	London Com (Prin)	36	14	2	20	20	48	30	8th	—	—	—	—	George Dale	9
1918–19	London Com (Prin)	36	16	7	13	69	60	39	5th	—	—	—	—	George Dale	18
1919–20	Southern 1	42	18	10	14	62	50	46	6th	R1	—	London Challenge Cup	SF	James Birch	17
1920–21	Division 3 (Note: In 1920, the Football League formed a third division comprising the majority of the Southern League First Division clubs.)	42	22	9	11	61	32	53	3rd	R2	—	London Challenge Cup	SF	Jack Smith	19
1921–22	Division 3S	42	18	13	11	53	44	49	5th	R1	—	London Challenge Cup	R2	James Birch	17
1922–23	Division 3S	42	16	10	16	54	49	42	11th	QF	—	London Challenge Cup	R1	Dick Parker	20
1923–24	Division 3S	42	11	9	22	37	77	31	22nd	R1	—	London Challenge Cup	R1	Dick Parker	14
1924–25	Division 3S	42	14	8	20	42	63	36	19th	R1	—	London Challenge Cup	SF	Henry Johnson Colin Myers	10
1925–26	Division 3S	42	6	9	27	37	84	21	22nd	R2	—	London Challenge Cup	R1	James Birch	7
1926–27	Division 3S	42	15	9	18	65	71	39	14th	—	—	London Challenge Cup	R2	George Goddard	23
1927–28	Division 3S	42	17	9	16	72	71	43	10th	R1	—	London Challenge Cup	R2	George Goddard	26
1928–29	Division 3S	42	19	14	9	82	61	52	6th	R1	—	London Challenge Cup	R2	George Goddard	38
1929–30	Division 3S	42	21	9	12	80	68	51	3rd	R3	—	London Challenge Cup	R1	George Goddard (Note: Goddard scored 37 goals in the Third Division South.)	42 ♦
1930–31	Division 3S	42	20	3	19	82	75	43	8th	R3	—	—	—	George Goddard	27
1931–32	Division 3S	42	15	12	15	79	73	42	13th	R4	—	—	—	George Goddard	19
1932–33	Division 3S	42	13	11	18	72	87	37	16th	R3	—	—	—	George Goddard George Rounce	14
1933–34	Division 3S	42	24	6	12	70	51	54	4th	R3	—	Division 3S Cup	R3	Jack Blackman	31
1934–35	Division 3S	42	16	9	17	63	72	41	13th	R2	—	Division 3S Cup	R3	Jack Blackman	21
1935–36	Division 3S	42	22	9	11	84	53	53	4th	R1	—	Division 3S Cup	R2	Tommy Cheetham	37
1936–37	Division 3S	42	18	9	15	73	52	45	9th	R3	—	Division 3S Cup	R1	Alfred Fitzgerald	21
1937–38	Division 3S	42	22	9	11	80	47	53	3rd	R2	—	Division 3S Cup	R3	Alfred Fitzgerald	21
1938–39	Division 3S	42	15	14	13	68	49	44	6th	R3	—	Division 3S Cup (Note: The 1938–39 Third Division South Cup was never completed.)	SF(S)	Tommy Cheetham	27
1939–40 (Note: When the Second World War began, the 1939–40 Football League season was abandoned with three matches played and QPR in 16th position.)	Division 3S League South 'B' League South 'D'	3 18 18	0 12 10	2 2 3	1 4 5	4 49 38	5 26 28	2 26 23	16th 1st 2nd	—	—	Football League War Cup	Pre	Dave Mangnall	40
1940–41	League South London War Cup (Note: The cup consisted of an initial league round followed by a final.)	23 10	8 5	3 1	12 4	47 26	60 26	0.783 (Note: As the league during this season consisted of teams who each played a different number of games, goal average was used to rank the teams.) 11	25th 3rd	—	—	Football League War Cup	R4	Dave Mangnall	41
1941–42	League South London War Cup	30 6	11 2	3 1	16 3	52 8	59 7	25 5	10th 3rd	—	—	—	—	Dave Mangnall	12
1942–43	League South	28	18	2	8	64	49	38	3rd	—	—	League Cup South	SF	Reg Swinfen	16
1943–44	League South	30	14	12	4	69	54	40	3rd	—	—	League Cup South	Grp	William Heathcote	36
1944–45	League South	30	10	10	10	70	61	30	9th	—	—	League Cup South	Grp	William Heathcote	23
1945–46	Division 3SN	20	14	4	2	50	15	32	1st	R5 (Note: The FA Cup was contested in 1945–46. From the first round proper to the sixth round (quarter-final), results were determined on aggregate score over two legs.)	—	Division 3SN Cup	SF	Frank Neary	23
1946–47	Division 3S	42	23	11	8	74	40	57	2nd	R3	—	—	—	Johnny Pattison	17
1947–48	Division 3S ↑	42	26	9	7	74	37	61	1st	QF	—	—	—	Cyril Hatton	25
1948–49	Division 2	42	14	11	17	44	62	39	13th	R3	—	—	—	Bert Addinall	9
1949–50	Division 2	42	11	12	19	40	57	34	20th	R3	—	—	—	Bert Addinall	11
1950–51	Division 2	42	15	10	17	71	82	40	16th	R3	—	—	—	Cyril Hatton	16
1951–52	Division 2 ↓	42	11	12	19	52	81	34	22nd	R3	—	—	—	Conway Smith	13
1952–53	Division 3S	46	12	15	19	61	82	39	20th	R1	—	—	—	Conway Smith	14
1953–54	Division 3S	46	16	10	20	60	68	42	18th	R3	—	—	—	Conway Smith	12
1954–55	Division 3S	46	15	14	17	69	75	44	15th	R1	—	—	—	Conway Smith	18
1955–56	Division 3S	46	14	11	21	64	86	39	18th	R1	—	Southern Floodlight Cup	R1	Conway Smith	19
1956–57	Division 3S	46	18	11	17	61	60	47	10th	R3	—	Southern Floodlight Cup	R2	Arthur Longbottom	15
1957–58	Division 3S	46	18	14	14	64	65	50	10th	R2	—	Southern Floodlight Cup	R1	Arthur Longbottom	18
1958–59	Division 3	46	19	8	19	74	77	46	13th	R3	—	Southern Floodlight Cup	R1	Arthur Longbottom	20
1959–60	Division 3	46	18	13	15	73	54	49	8th	R2	—	Southern Floodlight Cup	R1	Brian Bedford	27
1960–61	Division 3	46	25	10	11	93	60	60	3rd	R2	R1	—	—	Brian Bedford	37
1961–62	Division 3	46	24	11	11	111	73	59	4th	R3	R2	—	—	Brian Bedford	39
1962–63	Division 3	46	17	11	18	85	76	45	13th	R3	R2	—	—	Brian Bedford	26
1963–64	Division 3	46	17	9	19	76	78	45	15th	R3	R1	—	—	Brian Bedford	25
1964–65	Division 3	46	17	12	17	72	80	46	14th	R2	R2	—	—	Brian Bedford	26
1965–66	Division 3	46	24	9	13	95	65	57	3rd	R3	R1	—	—	Les Allen (Note: Allen scored 30 goals in the Third Division.)	33 ♦
1966–67	Division 3 ↑	46	26	15	5	103	38	67	1st	R3	W	—	—	Rodney Marsh (Note: Marsh scored 30 goals in the Third Division.)	44 ♦
1967–68	Division 2 ↑	42	25	8	9	67	36	58	2nd	R3	R4	—	—	Rodney Marsh	14
1968–69	Division 1 ↓	42	4	10	28	39	95	18	22nd	R3	R2	—	—	Barry Bridges Mick Leach	8
1969–70	Division 2	42	17	11	14	66	57	45	9th	QF	QF	—	—	Barry Bridges	24
1970–71	Division 2	42	16	11	15	58	53	43	11th	R3	R3	—	—	Rodney Marsh	23
1971–72	Division 2	42	20	14	8	57	28	54	4th	R3	R4	—	—	Rodney Marsh	20
1972–73	Division 2 ↑	42	24	13	5	81	37	61	2nd	R5	R2	—	—	Don Givens (Note: Givens scored 23 goals in the Third Division.)	26 ♦
1973–74	Division 1	42	13	17	12	56	52	43	8th	QF	R4	—	—	Stan Bowles	22
1974–75	Division 1	42	16	10	16	54	54	42	11th	R5	R3	—	—	Don Givens	21
1975–76	Division 1	42	24	11	7	67	33	59	2nd	R3	R4	—	—	Don Givens	13
1976–77	Division 1	42	13	12	17	47	52	38	14th	R4	SF	UEFA Cup	QF	Stan Bowles Don Givens	19
1977–78	Division 1	42	9	15	18	47	64	33	19th	R5	R3	—	—	Stan Bowles	9
1978–79	Division 1 ↓	42	6	13	23	45	73	25	20th	R3	R4	—	—	Peter Eastoe Paul Goddard	6
1979–80	Division 2	42	18	13	11	75	53	49	5th	R3	R4	—	—	Clive Allen (Note: Allen scored 28 goals in the Second Division.)	30 ♦
1980–81	Division 2	42	15	13	14	56	46	43	8th	R3	R3	—	—	Tommy Langley	9
1981–82	Division 2	42	21	6	15	65	43	69 (Note: The 1981–82 season saw the introduction of three points for a win instead of two.)	5th	F (Note: Rangers drew 1–1 with Tottenham Hotspur at Wembley Stadium in the 1982 FA Cup Final, losing 1–0 in the replay.)	R3	—	—	Simon Stainrod	24
1982–83	Division 2 ↑	42	26	7	9	77	36	85	1st	R3	R2	—	—	John Gregory Tony Sealy	16
1983–84	Division 1	42	22	7	13	67	37	73	5th	R3	R2	—	—	Simon Stainrod	16
1984–85	Division 1	42	13	11	18	53	72	50	19th	R3	QF	UEFA Cup	R2	Gary Bannister	28
1985–86	Division 1	42	15	7	20	53	64	52	13th	R3	F	—	—	Gary Bannister	18
1986–87	Division 1	42	13	11	18	48	64	50	16th	R5	R2	—	—	Gary Bannister	16
1987–88	Division 1	40	19	10	11	48	38	67	5th	R5	R3	Full Members' Cup	R1	Gary Bannister	10
1988–89	Division 1	38	14	11	13	43	37	53	9th	R3	QF	Full Members Cup Merc CC Trophy	SF R1	Mark Falco	15
1989–90	Division 1	38	13	11	14	45	44	50	11th	QF	R3	—	—	Colin Clarke	9
1990–91	Division 1	38	12	10	16	44	53	46	12th	R3	R4	Full Members Cup	R2	Roy Wegerle	19
1991–92	Division 1	42	12	18	12	48	47	54	11th	R3	R3	Full Members Cup	QF	Dennis Bailey	11
1992–93	Premier League	42	17	12	13	63	55	63	5th	R4	R4	—	—	Les Ferdinand	24
1993–94	Premier League	42	16	12	14	62	61	60	9th	R3	R4	—	—	Les Ferdinand	18
1994–95	Premier League	42	17	9	16	61	59	60	8th	QF	R3	—	—	Les Ferdinand	26
1995–96	Premier League ↓	38	9	6	23	38	57	33	19th	R4	R4	—	—	Danny Dichio	12
1996–97	Division 1	46	18	12	16	64	60	66	9th	R5	R2	—	—	John Spencer	18
1997–98	Division 1	46	10	19	17	51	63	49	21st	R3	R1	—	—	Mike Sheron	11
1998–99	Division 1	46	12	11	23	52	61	47	20th	R3	R2	—	—	Mike Sheron	9
1999–00	Division 1	46	16	18	12	62	53	66	10th	R4	R1	—	—	Chris Kiwomya Stuart Wardley	14
2000–01	Division 1 ↓	46	7	19	20	45	75	40	23rd	R4	R1	—	—	Peter Crouch	12
2001–02	Division 2	46	19	14	13	60	49	71	8th	R1	R1	Football League Trophy	R1	Andy Thomson	21
2002–03	Division 2	46	24	11	11	69	45	83	4th	R1	R1	Football League Trophy	R1	Paul Furlong Kevin Gallen	14
2003–04	Division 2 ↑	46	22	17	7	80	45	83	2nd	R1	R3	Football League Trophy	SF(S)	Kevin Gallen	17
2004–05	Championship	46	17	11	18	54	58	62	11th	R3	R2	—	—	Paul Furlong	18
2005–06	Championship	46	12	14	20	50	65	50	21st	R3	R1	—	—	Gareth Ainsworth Marc Nygaard	9
2006–07	Championship	46	14	11	21	54	68	53	18th	R3	R2	—	—	Dexter Blackstock	14
2007–08	Championship	46	14	16	16	60	66	58	14th	R3	R1	—	—	Ákos Buzsáky	10
2008–09	Championship	46	15	16	25	42	44	61	11th	R3	R4	—	—	Dexter Blackstock	12
2009–10	Championship	46	14	15	17	58	65	57	13th	R3	R3	—	—	Jay Simpson	13
2010–11	Championship ↑	46	24	16	6	71	32	88	1st	R3	R1	—	—	Adel Taarabt	19
2011–12	Premier League	38	10	7	21	43	66	37	17th	R4	R2	—	—	Heiðar Helguson	9
2012–13	Premier League ↓	38	4	13	21	30	60	25	20th	R4	R3	—	—	Loïc Rémy	6
2013–14	Championship ↑	46	23	11	12	60	44	80	4th	R3	R2	—	—	Charlie Austin	18
2014–15	Premier League ↓	38	8	6	24	42	73	30	20th	R3	R2	—	—	Charlie Austin	18
2015–16	Championship	46	14	18	14	54	54	60	12th	R3	R2	—	—	Charlie Austin Tjaronn Chery	10
2016–17	Championship	46	15	8	23	52	66	53	18th	R3	R3	—	—	Idrissa Sylla	10
2017–18	Championship	46	15	11	20	58	70	56	16th	R3	R2	—	—	Matt Smith	11
2018–19	Championship	46	14	9	23	53	71	51	19th	R5	R3	—	—	Nahki Wells	9
2019–20	Championship	46	16	10	20	67	76	58	13th	R4	R2	—	—	Jordan Hugill Nahki Wells	15
2020–21	Championship	46	19	11	16	57	55	68	9th	R3	R1	—	—	Lyndon Dykes	12
2021–22	Championship	46	19	9	18	60	59	66	11th	R4	R4	—	—	Andre Gray	10
2022–23	Championship	46	13	11	22	44	71	50	20th	06|R3	R1	—	—	Lyndon Dykes	8
2023–24	Championship	46	15	11	20	47	58	56	18th	R3	R1	—	—	Lyndon Dykes	7
2024–25	Championship	46	14	14	18	53	63	56	15th	R3	R3	—	—	Michael Frey	8
2025–26	Championship	46	16	10	20	61	73	58	15th	R3	R1	—	—	Richard Kone	11

General sources:
