= 1945–46 Queens Park Rangers F.C. season =

English football club season

Queens Park Rangers
1945–46 season
- Chairman: Charles W Fielding
- Manager: Dave Mangnal
- Stadium: Loftus Road
- Third Division South (North Region) First Half Season: Champions
- Third Division South (North Region) Second Half Season: Champions
- FA Cup: Fifth round
- Third Division South (North Region) Second Half Cup: Semi-Final
- Top goalscorer: League: William Heathcote 18; All: Frank Neary 23
- Highest home attendance: 20,080 v Crystal Palace (5 January 1946)
- Lowest home attendance: 5,000 v Mansfield (2 March 1946)
- Biggest win: 6–0 v Clapton Orient (22 April 1946) v Notts County (3 Nov 1945)
- Biggest defeat: 1–3 v Brentford (9 February 1946)
Home colours	Away colours

The 1945–46 Queens Park Rangers season was the club's 55th season of existence and their first back in the English Third Division, though the league was divided following the end of World War II. QPR won the division championship in the league campaign and won the Third Division second half cup, and were eliminated in the fifth round of the FA Cup.

== Season summary ==
Whilst the pre-WW2 scheduling and divisions had still not returned for the 1945–46 English Football Season, the 44 clubs in the top two divisions of the 1938–39 season would play in the Football League North and Football League South without promotion and relegation from the previous peacetime season. Queens Park Rangers excelled in both first half and second half of the league, losing 6 games all season but falling late on in both cup competitions.

== League standings ==
=== First Half Season ===
Pos	Team	Pld	W	D	L	GF	GA	Pts
1	Queens Park Rangers	20	14	4	2	50	15	32
2	Norwich City	20	11	4	5	54	31	26
3	Port Vale	20	9	6	5	34	25	24

=== Second Half Season (Cup Tournament) ===
Pos	Team	Pld	W	D	L	GF	GA	Pts	
1	Queens Park Rangers	16	11	3	2	38	11	25	Qualified
2	Walsall	16	10	4	2	34	18	24	Qualified
3	Mansfield Town	16	8	4	4	24	15	20	

== Results ==
QPR scores given first

Win Draw Loss

=== First Half Season ===
Date	Opponents	Venue	Result	Score F–A	Scorers	Attendance	Position
25 August 1945	Southend	Away	W	2–1	Crack 2	8000	2
1 September 1945	Southend	Home	W	4–1	Mallett, Hatton 2, Neary	8360	2
5 September 1945	Clapton Orient	Away	W	2–0	Crack, Heathcote	4000	2
8 September 1945	Walsall	Home	W	4–0	Neary 3, Heathcote	8000	1
12 September 1945	Mansfield	Away	W	6–2	Neary 2, Mallett 2, Heathcote, Somerfield	7000	1
15 September 1945	Walsall	Away	D	1–1	Salmon	7000	1
19 September 1945	Clapton Orient	Home	W	3–0	Heathcote 2, Mallett	6485	1
22 September 1945	Port Vale	Away	D	0–0		8000	1
29 September 1945	Port Vale	Home	W	4–1	Mallett, Heathcote, Abel, Neary	13750	1
6 October 1945	Ipswich Town	Home	W	2–0	Heathcote, Mallett	18000	1
13 October 1945	Ipswich Town	Away	L	1–2	Mallett	16000	1
20 October 1945	Northampton	Away	W	2–0	Neary, Heathcote	9000	1
27 October 1945	Northampton	Home	W	4–1	Heathcote 3, Addinall	9000	1
3 November 1945	Notts County	Home	W	6–0	Neary 2, Heathcote 4	15000	1
10 November 1945	Notts County	Away	W	1–0	Heathcote	23186	1
1 December 1945	Watford	Away	W	2–0	Whitehead, Neary	11215	1
8 December 1945	Watford	Home		PP			
25 December 1945	Norwich City	Away	D	1–1	Ridyard	20082	1
26 December 1945	Norwich City	Home	L	1–2	Neary	19000	1
29 December 1945	Mansfield	Home	W	3–2	Ridyard, Heathcote 2	9965	1
1 January 1946	Watford	Home	D	1–1	Ridyard	6400	1

=== Second Half Season ===
Date	Opponents	H/A	Result	Score F–A	Scorers	Attendance	Position
12 January 1946	Ipswich Town	Home	W	4–1	Stock 2, Heath, Mallett	12000	1
19 January 1946	Ipswich Town	Away	L	0–1		9508	4
26 January 1946	Bristol City	H		PP			
2 February 1946	Bristol City	Away	L	0–2		10800	8
9 February 1946	Southend United	A		PP			
16 February 1946	Southend	Home	W	4–0	Mallett, Stock 2, Heath	7000	8
23 February 1946	Mansfield	Away	D	0–0		5000	8
2 March 1946	Mansfield	Home	W	3–0	Heath, Boxshall	5000	6
9 March 1946	Watford	Away	W	3–1	Pattison, Heath 2	8665	4
16 March 1946	Watford	Home	W	2–1	Heath, McEwan	8838	2
23 March 1946	Port Vale	Home	W	4–2	Heath 2, McEwan, Neary	10000	2
30 March 1946	Port Vale	Away	W	2–0	OG, Neary	10000	1
6 April 1946	Notts County	Home	W	3–1	Mallett, Neary, Chapman	15000	1
13 April 1946	Notts County	Away	W	3–0	Pattison 2, McEwan	9000	1
17 April 1946	Southend	Away	D	0–0			1
19 April 1946	Bristol City	Home	W	4–2	Hatton, Pattison, McEwan, Neary	17500	1
20 April 1946	Clapton Orient	Away	D	0–0		14000	1
22 April 1946	Clapton Orient	Home	W	6–0	Heathcote, Pattison 2, Neary 2, OG	17000	1

=== Second Half Season (Cup Tournament) ===
Date	Round	Opponents	Venue	Result F–A	Scorers	Attendance
27 April 1946	Semifinal First Leg	AFC Bournemouth	Away	1–1	Heathcote	13000
1 May 1946	Semifinal Second Leg	AFC Bournemouth	Home	0–1 (Sudden Death)		15000

=== FA Cup ===
Date	Round	Opponents	Venue	Result F–A	Scorers	Attendance
17 November 1945	First Round First leg	Barnet	Away	6–2	Heathcote, Mallett 2, Neary 3	6800
24 November 1945	First Round Second leg	Barnet	Home	2–1	Swinfen, Neary	11600
8 December 1945	Second round First leg	Ipswich Town	Home	4–0	Neary, Stock, Addinall 2	12000
15 December 1945	Second round Second leg	Ipswich Town	Away	2–0	Daniels, Addinall	12000
5 January 1946	Third round First leg	Crystal Palace	Home	0–0		20080
9 January 1946	Third round Second leg	Crystal Palace	Away	0–0: abandoned		26400
16 January 1946	Third round Replay	Crystal Palace	Craven Cottage	1–0	Addinall	23000
26 January 1946	Fourth round First leg	Southampton	Away	1–0	Addinall	19000
30 January 1946	Fourth round Second leg	Southampton	Home	4–3	Addinall 3, Stock	16000
9 February 1946	Fifth round First leg	Brentford	Home	1–3	Pattison	19885
14 February 1946	Fifth round Second leg	Brentford	Away	0–0		20000

=== Friendlies ===
15 December 1945	Bristol City	H	Friendly	PP
22 December 1945	Bristol City	H	Friendly	
24 April 1946	British Army of the Rhine	Bahrenfeld Stadium (Hamburg).	Friendly	0–5

== Squad ==
Position	Nationality	Name	League Appearances	League Goals	Cup Appearances	Cup Tournament Goals	F.A Cup Goals	Total Appearances	Total Goals
GK	(England)	Reg Allen	19		27			46	
GK	(England)	Harry Brown	1		2			3	
DF	(England)	Jack Rose	20		24			44	
DF	(England)	Arthur Jefferson	15		18			33	
DF	(England)	Des Farrow	14		20			34	
DF	(England)	Bill Heath	3		14	8		17	8
DF	(England)	Matt Gillies	2					2	
DF	(England)	Frederick Alexander	1		1			2	
DF	(England)	Ted Reay			8			8	
MF	(England)	Les Blizzard	2		4			6	
MF	(England)	Alf Ridyard	19	3	27			46	3
MF	(England)	Joe Mallett	19	7	29	3	2	48	12
MF	(England)	Harry Daniels	19		29		1	48	1
MF	(England)	Billy Whitehead	4	1	5			9	1
MF	(England)	Albert Smith	1		1			2	
MF	(England)	Ron Webb	1					1	
MF	(Wales)	Ivor Powell			6			6	
MF	(England)	Reg Chapman			7	1		7	1
MF	(England)	Alf Parkinson			4			4	
FW	(England)	William Heathcote	17	18	7	2	1	24	21
FW	(England)	Frank Neary	15	12	17	6	5	32	23
FW	(England)	Alf Somerfield	7	1				7	1
FW	(England)	Samuel Abel	6	1	1			7	1
FW	(England)	Alec Stock	5	4	14		2	19	6
FW	(England)	Bert Addinall	4	1	8	8		12	9
FW	(England)	Leon Salmon	4	1				4	1
FW	(Scotland)	Johnny Pattison	3		21	6	1	24	7
FW	(England)	Fred Crack	3	3				3	3
FW	(England)	Cyril Hatton	2	2	3	1		5	3
FW	(England)	Reg Swinfen	2		6	1		8	1
FW	(England)	Danny Boxshall	1		2	1		3	1
FW	(England)	Billy Wrigglesworth	1					1	
FW	(England)	George Jones	1					1	
FW	(England)	Syd Peppitt	1					1	
FW	(England)	Les Smith	1					1	
FW	(England)	Dave Mangnall			1			1	
FW	(Scotland)	Billy McEwan			10	4		10	4
FW	(England)	Eddie Smith	1					1	
		James Lennon	1		1			2	
		Joe Johnston	1					1	
		Albert Shaw	1					1	
		Richard Hibbs	1					1	
		David Hamilton	1		2			3	
		Les Crompton	1					1	

== Transfers in ==
Name	from	Date	Fee
Hatton, Cyril	Notts County	August 1945	Loan
Levy, Len *			
Hardy, Eric *			
Hibbs, Richard *			
Toulouse, Cyril *			
Neary, Frank	Finchley		
Lennon, James			
Muchmore, Fred *			
Danny Boxshall	Salem Athletic	1 January 1946	
Palmer, Wallace *		23 January 1946	
Birch, Jack *		2 March 1946	
Cyril Hatton	Notts County	9 April 1946	£1,000
Stan Armitage	Charlton	June 1946	

== Transfers out ==
Name	from	Date	Fee	Date	Club	Fee
Morton, Geoff *		8 June 1940		1945	Chelmsford City	
Gunner, Ronald *	Metropolitan Police	March 1942		1945	Metropolitan Police	
Beadell, Ralph *		15 September 1942		1945		
Sibley, Albert (Joe)	Southend	March 1942	Loan	1945	Southend	Loan
Burley, Ben	Darlington	21 September 1942		1945	Chelmsford City	
Devine, John	Aberdeen	31 May 1938	Free	cs 1945		
Francis, Edgar *	Hayes	12 July 1939		cs 1945	Southall	
Bird, George *		26 August 1944		cs 1945	Hayes	
Farmer, Alec	Yeovil & Petters U	2 September 1933		cs 1945	Retired (QPR Assistant Trainer)	
Edwards, Ernest *		24 October 1940		cs 1945		
Dumsday, John *		30 April 1940		cs 1945		
DeBusser, Emiel *	Belgian Army	11 May 1943		cs 1945		
Stevens, Ron	Luton	13 April 1939		cs 1945		
Bentley, Denis *	Hounslow	15 April 1939		cs 1945		
Mangnall, Dave	Millwall	16 May 1939		cs 1945	Retired (QPR manager)	
Ling, Leonard *		15 October 1940		cs 1945		
Webb, Jack *		15 October 1940		cs 1945		
Griffiths, Joseph *		27 October 1943		cs 1945		
King, Peter *		22 January 1945		cs 1945	Hayes	
Dolding, Len *	Wealdstone	10 March 1943		July 1945	Chelsea	
Gadsden, Ron *		3 December 1942		August ? 1945	Hayes	
Hatton, Cyril	Notts County	August 1945	Loan	September 1945	Notts County	Loan
Gillies, Matt	Bolton	March 1944	Loan	September 1945	Bolton	Loan
Bonass, Albert	Chesterfield	26 May 1939	£200	October 1945	R.A.F., died in plane crash	
Anderson, Fred *	Kensington Sports	4 April 1940		November 1945	Guildford City	
Fitzgerald, Alf	Hearts	30 April 1942		November 1945	Aldershot	
Moon, William *	Tufnell Park	11 May 1945		December 1945		
Smith, Eddie (Ginger) *	Junior	28 September 1944		1946	Hayes	
Shaw, Arthur *	Hounslow Town	cs1942		January 1946	Hayes	
Palmer, Wallace *		23 January 1946		March ? 1946		
Stock, Alec	Charlton	25 February 1938		March 1946	Yeovil & Petters U (player/man.)	
Brown, Harry		8 June 1940		April 1946	Notts County	
Birch, Jack *		2 March 1946		April ? 1946		
Len Levy *		21 August 1945		June? 1946	Guildford City	
Sam Abel	Fulham	29 May 1934	£400	June? 1946	Retired	
William Byrom	Burnley	18 May 1939	Free	June 1946	Rochdale	
Kenith Wilson *		8 June 1940		June? 1946	Hayes ?	
George Jones *		1 September 1943		June? 1946	Crystal P	
William Daragon		18 December 1944		June? 1946		
James Lennon		17 September 1945		June? 1946		
Fred Alexander		15 December 1943		June? 1946	Dartford	
Richard Hibbs *		23 August 1945		June? 1946		
