= 1949–50 Queens Park Rangers F.C. season =

English football club season

Queens Park Rangers
1949–50 season
- Chairman: Albert Hittinger
- Manager: Dave Mangnall
- Stadium: Loftus Road
- Football League Second Division: 20th
- FA Cup: Third Round
- London Challenge Cup: Quarter Finalist
- Top goalscorer: League: Bert Addinall 11; All: Bert Addinall 11
- Highest home attendance: 29,771 v Tottenham (21 Apr 1950)
- Lowest home attendance: 8,873 v Bradford Park Avenue (5 Nov 1949)
- Biggest win: 3–0 v Luton Town (10 Sept 1949)
- Biggest defeat: 0–5 v Barnsley (31 Jan 1950)
Home colours	Away colours

The 1949-50 Queens Park Rangers season was the club's 59th season of existence and their 2nd in the Football League Second Division. QPR finished 20th in their league campaign, avoiding relegation by two points. QPR were eliminated in the third round of the FA Cup.

In June 1950, Reg Allen was transferred to Manchester United for £11,000, a then world-record fee for a goalkeeper.

== League standings ==
Pos	Team	Pld	W	D	L	GF	GA	GAv	Pts	Qualification or relegation
18	Bury	42	14	9	19	60	65	0.923	37	
19	West Ham United	42	12	12	18	53	61	0.869	36	
20	Queens Park Rangers	42	11	12	19	40	57	0.702	34	
21	Plymouth Argyle (R)	42	8	16	18	44	65	0.677	32	Relegation to the Third Division South
22	Bradford (Park Avenue) (R)	42	10	11	21	51	77	0.662	31	Relegation to the Third Division North

Rules for classification: 1) Points; 2) Goal average; 3) Goals scored
(R) Relegated

== Results ==
QPR scores given first

Win Draw Loss

=== Second Division ===
Date	Opponents	Venue	Result F–A	Scorers	Attendance	Position
20 Aug 1949	Leeds United	Away	1–1	B. Pointon	31589	14
24 Aug 1949	Brentford	Home	3–3	J. Pattison (2) ((2) pens), B. Pointon	20931	10
27 Aug 1949	Southampton	Home	1–0	S. Hudson	23040	9
31 Aug 1949	Brentford	Away	2–0	C. Hatton, S. Hudson	25741	4
3 Sept 1949	Coventry City	Away	0–0		22606	5
7 Sept 1949	Preston North End	Home	0–0		20113	2
10 Sept 1949	Luton Town	Home	3–0	A. Addinall, C. Hatton, T. Duggan	20674	2
14 Sept 1949	Preston North End	Away	2–3	Robertson (og), A. Addinall	26515	2
17 Sept 1949	Barnsley	Away	1–3	A. Addinall	19787	7
24 Sept 1949	West Ham United	Home	0–1		24578	9
1 Oct 1949	Sheffield United	Away	1–1	Ramscar	28150	11
8 Oct 1949	Hull City	Home	1–4	T. Duggan	28725	12
15 Oct 1949	Sheffield Wednesday	Away	0–1		31728	14
22 Oct 1949	Plymouth Argyle	Home	0–2		16381	17
29 Oct 1949	Chesterfield	Away	1–2	F. Neary	12202	19
5 Nov 1949	Bradford Park Avenue	Home	0–1		8873	19
12 Nov 1949	Leicester City	Away	2–3	A. Addinall, Parkinson	27058	20
19 Nov 1949	Bury	Home	1–0	F. Neary	15257	19
26 Nov 1949	Tottenham Hotspur	Away	0–3		62783	20
3 Dec 1949	Cardiff City	Home	0–1		15954	21
10 Dec 1949	Blackburn Rovers	Away	0–0		16808	22
17 Dec 1949	Leeds United	Home	1–1	T. Best	13256	22
24 Dec 1949	Southampton	Away	2–1	F. Neary (2)	21382	21
26 Dec 1949	Grimsby Town	Away	1–1	S. Hudson	22053	19
27 Dec 1949	Grimsby Town	Home	1–2	A. Addinall	22994	19
31 Dec 1949	Coventry City	Home	2–0	B. McEwan, T. Best	16847	20
14 Jan 1950	Luton Town	Away	2–1	D. Mills, F. Neary	16291	17
31 Jan 1950	Barnsley	Home	0–5		16597	19
4 Feb 1950	West Ham United	Away	0–1		25440	20
18 Feb 1950	Sheffield United	Home	1–3	J. McKay	20264	22
25 Feb 1950	Hull City	Away	1–1	D. Mills	24586	22
4 Mar 1950	Sheffield Wednesday	Home	0–0		23273	21
11 Mar 1950	Plymouth Argyle	Away	2–0	T. Best, A. Addinall	22093	18
18 Mar 1950	Chesterfield	Home	3–2	G. Wardle, A. Addinall (2)	18502	18
25 Mar 1950	Bradford Park Avenue	Away	0–1		18063	18
1 Apr 1950	Tottenham Hotspur	Home	0–2		29771	19
7 Apr 1950	Swansea City	Home	0–0		23217	19
8 Apr 1950	Cardiff City	Away	0–4		21102	21
10 Apr 1950	Swansea City	Away	1–0	S. Hudson	18405	21
15 Apr 1950	Leicester City	Home	2–0	A. Addinall (2)	15311	20
22 Apr 1950	Bury	Away	0–0		11383	20
29 Apr 1950	Blackburn Rovers	Home	2–3	A. Addinall, C. Hatton	10352	20

=== FA Cup ===
Date	Round	Opponents	H / A	Result F–A	Scorers	Attendance
7 Jan 1950	Third Round	Everton (First Division)	H	0–2		22433

=== London Challenge Cup ===
Date	Round	Opponents	H / A	Result F–A	Scorers	Attendance
10 October 1949	First Round	Barnet	H	2–1		
24 October 1949	Quarter-Finals	Fulham	A	1–3		

=== Friendlies ===
13-Aug-49	Blues v Reds	H	Practice Match
28-Jan-50	Preston North End	A	Friendly
11-Feb-50	Millwall	a	Friendly
13-Mar-50	St Just	A	Friendly
26-Apr-50	Dorking	A	Friendly
6-May-50	Charlton Athletic	h	Friendly
21-May-50	La Gantoise	A	Friendly

== Squad ==
Position	Nationality	Name	League Appearances	League Goals	F..A.Cup Appearances	F.A.Cup Goals	Total Appearances	Total Goals
GK	(England)	Reg Allen	41		1		41	
GK	(England)	Reg Saphin	1				1	
GK	(England)	Dave Underwood						
DF	(England)	George Powell	28		1		29	
DF	(England)	Bill Heath	25		1		26	
DF	(England)	Des Farrow	22		1		23	
DF	(England)	Arthur Jefferson	17				17	
DF	(England)	Reg Dudley	13				13	
DF	(England)	Ted Reay	2				2	
MF	(England)	Horace Woodward	32				32	
MF	(England)	Alf Parkinson	17	1			17	1
MF	(Scotland)	Dave Nelson	13				13	
MF	(England)	Reg Chapman	13		1		14	
FW	(England)	Cyril Hatton	37	3	1		38	3
FW	(England)	Bert Addinall	28	11			28	11
FW	(England)	George Wardle	28	1	1		29	1
FW	(England)	Ted Duggan	20	2			20	2
FW	(England)	Frank Neary	18	5	1		19	5
FW	(Wales)	Charlie Hill	16				16	
FW	(England)	Fred Ramscar	14	1			14	1
FW	(England)	Don Mills	13	2			13	2
FW	(England)	Stan Hudson	13	4	1		14	4
FW	(Wales)	Tommy Best	13	3	1		14	3
FW	(Scotland)	Johnny McKay	12	1			12	1
FW	(Scotland)	Billy McEwan	9	1	1		10	1
FW	(England)	Bill Pointon	9	2			9	2
FW	(Scotland)	Johnny Pattison	7	2			7	2
FW	(England)	Ernie Adams	1				1	

== Transfers in ==
Name	from	Date	Fee
Stan Gullan	Clyde	July 9, 1949	
John Twiss **		July ?1949	
Cyril Stevens		August 1949	
David Aitchison	Erith Technical Institute	September 26, 1949	
Frank Neary	Leyton Orient	October 1949	£7,000
Dave Underwood	Edgware Town	December 1949	
Tommy Best	Cardiff City	December 8, 1949	
Derek Parsons	Ashford Town	February 1950	
Dave Nelson	Brentford	February 1950	Bill Pointon
Eddie Davies	Arsenal	April 1950	Free
Brian Nicholas	Queens Park Rangers Juniors	May 1950	
Tony Ingham	Leeds	June 12, 1950	£5,000
Bobby Cameron	Port Glasgow	June 19, 1950	

== Transfers out ==
Name	from	Date	Fee	Date	Club	Fee
Albert Smith	Shirley Jnrs	May 1939		July 1949	Sittingbourne	
Ted Bennett	Southall	February 1949		July 1949	Southall	
Joe Millbank	Crystal Palace	July 1948		July 1949	Gillingham	Free
Doug Campbell	RAF Spitalgate	March 1948		July 1949	Crewe Alexandra	
Eric Worthington	Willesden Town	September 1947		August 1949	Watford	
Don Mills	Maltby Main	August 1946		August 1949	Torquay United	
George Smith	Brentford	May 1947	£2,000	September 1949	Ipswich (Assistant manager)	
Johnny Hartburn	Yeovil Town	March 17, 1947	£2,000	September 1949	Watford	£1,000
Fred Ramscar	Wolverhampton Wanderers	October 25, 1947		November 1949	Preston North End	£10,000
Jack Rose	Peterborough	January 15, 1943		December 1949	Retired (Knee injury)	
Billy McEwan	Petershill	May 30, 1938		February 1950	Leyton Orient	
Bill Pointon	Port Vale	January 20, 1949	£10,000	February 1950	Brentford	Dave Nelson
Johnny Pattison	Motherwell	May 20, 1937		February 1950	Leyton Orient	
Arthur Jefferson	Peterborough United	February 25, 1936		March 1950	Aldershot	£5,000
Ted Reay	Sheffield United	November 12, 1937		April 1950	Retired (QPR Assist. Trainer)	
Robert Sherwood	Brentford	May 1949		May 1950	Watford	
Reg Allen	Corona Social Club	May 6, 1938		June 1950	Manchester United	£11,000
John (Jack) MacDonald	Notts County	March 7, 1949		June? 1950		
John Twiss *		July ? 1949		June? 1950		
Pat Tobin		February 1949		June? 1950		
