= 1948–49 Queens Park Rangers F.C. season =

English football club season

Queens Park Rangers
1948–49 season
- Chairman: Albert Hittinger
- Manager: Dave Mangnall
- Stadium: Loftus Road
- Football League Second Division: 13th
- FA Cup: Third Round
- London Challenge Cup: Quarter Finalist
- Top goalscorer: League: Bert Addinall 9 All: Bert Addinall 9
- Highest home attendance: 27,950 v West Ham United (23 Oct 1948)
- Lowest home attendance: 16,557 v Luton Town (18 Dec 1948)
- Biggest win: 4–1 v Leicester City (26 Aug 1948)
- Biggest defeat: 0–5 v Fulham (2 Oct 1948)
Home colours	Away colours	Third colours

The 1948-49 Queens Park Rangers season was the club's 58th season of existence and their first in the Football League Second Division. QPR finished 13th in their league campaign, and were eliminated in the third round of the FA Cup.

On 15 December 1948, Ivor Powell commanded a £17,500 transfer fee when he was sold to Aston Villa. This was a record for a half back and for both the buying and selling clubs.

== League standings ==
Pos	Team	Pld	W	D	L	GF	GA	GAv	Pts
11	Grimsby Town	42	15	10	17	72	76	0.947	40
12	Bury	42	17	6	19	67	76	0.882	40
13	Queens Park Rangers	42	14	11	17	44	62	0.710	39
14	Blackburn Rovers	42	15	8	19	53	63	0.841	38
15	Leeds United	42	12	13	17	55	63	0.873	37

Rules for classification: 1) Points; 2) Goal average; 3) Goals scored

== Results ==
QPR scores given first

Win Draw Loss

=== Second Division ===
Date	Opponents	Venue	Result F–A	Scorers	Attendance	Position
21 Aug 1948	Luton Town	Away	0–0		23764	16
26 Aug 1948	Leicester City	Home	4–1	Addinall 3, Hartburn	23827	3
28 Aug 1948	Bradford City	Home	1–0	Addinall	27666	1
30 Aug 1948	Leicester City	Away	3–2	Mills, Hatton 2	34063	1
4 Sept 1948	Southampton	Away	0–3		27303	6
9 Sept 1948	Cardiff City	Home	0–0		25337	7
11 Sept 1948	Barnsley	Home	2–2	Addinall 2	20791	4
13 Sept 1948	Cardiff City	Away	0–3		36223	6
18 Sept 1948	Grimsby Town	Away	1–4	Pattison	15140	14
25 Sept 1948	Nottingham Forest	Home	2–1	Hartburn, Pattison	19361	11
2 Oct 1948	Fulham	Away	0–5		38667	15
9 Oct 1948	Brentford	Home	2–0	Hartburn, Hudson	25814	8
16 Oct 1948	Tottenham Hotspur	Away	0–1		69718	14
23 Oct 1948	West Ham United	Home	2–1	Hatton, Hudson	27950	9
30 Oct 1948	Bury	Away	0–0		19238	10
6 Nov 1948	West Bromwich Albion	Home	0–2		24459	15
13 Nov 1948	Chesterfield	Away	1–2	Hartburn	10837	16
20 Nov 1948	Lincoln City	Home	2–0	Hatton, Gibbons	19465	14
27 Nov 1948	Sheffield Wednesday	Away	0–2		34776	15
4 Dec 1948	Coventry City	Home	0–3		16693	16
11 Dec 1948	Leeds United	Away	2–1	Gibbons, Pattison	26420	14
18 Dec 1948	Luton Town	Home	0–3		16557	16
25 Dec 1948	Blackburn Rovers	Away	0–2		31526	16
27 Dec 1948	Blackburn Rovers	Home	4–2	Parkinson 2, Hatton, Hartburn	17091	15
1 Jan 1949	Bradford City	Away	0–0		15178	15
15-Jan-1949	Southampton	H	PP			
22 Jan 1949	Barnsley	Away	0–4		20596	18
29 Jan 1949	Southampton	Home	1–3	Pointon	23317	19
5 Feb 1949	Grimsby Town	Home	1–2	Hudson	19813	19
19 Feb 1949	Nottingham Forest	Away	0–0		26164	19
26 Feb 1949	Fulham	Home	1–0	Ramscar	27440	18
5 Mar 1949	Brentford	Away	3–0	Hudson, Pointon, Duggan	29420	16
12 Mar 1949	Tottenham Hotspur	Home	0–0		25416	16
19 Mar 1949	West Ham United	Away	0–2		25039	18
26 Mar 1949	Bury	Home	3–1	Duggan, Jefferson (pen), Ramscar	17547	14
2 Apr 1949	West Bromwich Albion	Away	1–1	Pointon	35293	13
9 Apr 1949	Chesterfield	Home	1–1	Hill	17898	16
15 Apr 1949	Plymouth Argyle	Home	2–1	Stewart, Pointon	22552	12
16 Apr 1949	Lincoln City	Away	0–0		11306	10
18 Apr 1949	Plymouth Argyle	Away	1–3	Addinall	19454	11
23 Apr 1949	Sheffield Wednesday	Home	1–3	Heath	18456	17
30 Apr 1949	Coventry City	Away	1–1	Stewart	14518	14
7 May 1949	Leeds United	Home	2–0	Addinall 2	16730	13

=== FA Cup ===
Date	Round	Opponents	H / A	Result F–A	Scorers	Attendance
8 Jan 1949	Third Round	Huddersfield Town (First Division)	Home	0–0		26000
15 Jan 1949	Third Round Replay	Huddersfield Town (First Division)	Away	0–5		31075

=== London Challenge Cup ===
Date	Round	Opponents	H / A	Result F–A	Scorers	Attendance
11 October 1948	First Round	Leytonstone	H	4–0		
24 October 1948	Quarter-Finals	West Ham	A	1–2		

=== Friendlies ===
14-Aug-48	Reds v Blues	h	Practice Match
2-May-49	Leyton Orient	a	
5-May-49	Willesden	A	
25-May-49	Demirspor	a	Tour of Turkey
26-May-49	Gencler Birligi	a	Tour of Turkey
28-May-49	KSK	a	Tour of Turkey
29-May-49	Altenordu/Althay (TUR) (A)	a	Tour of Turkey
2 June 1949	Fenerbache (TUR) (A)	a	Tour of Turkey
5 June 1949	Besiktas (TUR) (A)	a	Tour of Turkey
9 June 1949	Galatasaray (TUR) (A)	a	Tour of Turkey

== Squad ==
Position	Nationality	Name	League Appearances	League Goals	F..A.Cup Appearances	F.A.Cup Goals	Total Appearances	Total Goals
GK	(England)	Reg Allen	41		2		43	
GK	(England)	Ted Bennett	2				2	
GK	(England)	Reg Saphin						
DF	(England)	Arthur Jefferson	40	1	2		42	1
DF	(England)	George Powell	38		2		40	
DF	(England)	Bill Heath	19	1			19	1
DF	(England)	Des Farrow	17		2		19	
DF	(England)	Ted Reay	4				4	
DF	(England)	Reg Dudley	3				3	
MF	(England)	George Smith	38		2		40	
MF	(England)	Alf Parkinson	21	2	2		23	2
MF	(Wales)	Ivor Powell	21				21	
MF	(England)	Albert Smith	11				11	
MF	(England)	Joe Millbank	1				1	
MF	(Wales)	Brian Nicholas	1				1	
MF	(Scotland)	Alex Lennon	1				1	
FW	(England)	Johnny Hartburn	28	5	1		29	5
FW	(England)	Bert Addinall	22	9			22	9
FW	(England)	Cyril Hatton	22	5	1		23	5
FW	(England)	Fred Ramscar	21	2			21	2
FW	(England)	Bill Pointon	17	4			17	4
FW	(England)	Ted Duggan	15	2			15	2
FW	(Scotland)	Billy McEwan	15				15	
FW	(Scotland)	Johnny Pattison	12	3	2		14	3
FW	(Scotland)	George Stewart	12	2	2		14	2
FW	(England)	Don Mills	11	1	1		12	1
FW	(England)	George Wardle	11				11	
FW	(England)	Stan Hudson	10	4			10	4
FW	(England)	John Gibbons	9	2			9	2
FW	(Wales)	Charlie Hill	4	1			4	1
FW	(England)	Fred Durrant	3		2		5	
FW	(England)	Ernie Adams	2				2	
FW	(Scotland)	Billy Muir	1				1	
FW	(Scotland)	Doug Campbell	0		1		1	

== Transfers in ==
Name	from	Date	Fee
Joe Millbank	Crystal Palace	July 1948	
Stan Hudson	West Ham United	September 25, 1948	
George Wardle	Cardiff City	January 25, 1949	
Bill Pointon	Port Vale	January 20, 1949	£10,000
Ted Bennett	Southall	February 1949	
Ted Duggan	Luton Town	February 2, 1949	
Pat Tobin		February 1949	
Ernie Shepherd	Hull City	March 1949	
John (Jack) MacDonald	Notts County	March 7, 1949	
Charlie (Midge) Hill	Torquay United	March 16, 1949	
Johnny McKay	Irvine Meadow	May 1949	
Brian Nicholas	Queens Park Rangers Juniors	May 1949	
Horace Woodward	Tottenham	June 14, 1949	£10,500

== Transfers out ==
Name	from	Date	Fee	Date	Club	Fee
Jack Rose	Peterborough United	March 1945		July 1948	Peterborough United	
Harry Daniels	Kensington Sports	Aprill 4, 1940		August 1948	Brighton & Hove Albion	£2,000
James Riddell	Arsenal	March 6, 1948		August 1948	Hastings U	
Ivor Powell	Bargoed	September 23, 1937		December 1948	Aston Villa	£17,500
Fred Durrant	Brentford	September 1946	£5,000	February 1949	Exeter City	£5,000
Alex Lennon	Denaby United	January 1947		February 1949	Mansfield Town	Free
Don Mills	Maltby Main	August 1946		March 1949	Torquay United	
John Gibbons	Dartford	December 1947		May 1949	Ipswich Town	
