= 1941–42 Queens Park Rangers F.C. season =

English football club season

Queens Park Rangers
1941–42 season
- Chairman: Charles W Fielding
- Manager: Ted Vizard
- Stadium: Loftus Road
- South Regional Championship: 10th
- Top goalscorer: League: All: Dave Mangnall 12
- Highest home attendance: 8,932 v Arsenal (28 February 1942)
- Lowest home attendance: 1,829 v Chelsea (17 January 1942)
- Average home league attendance: 4,795
- Biggest win: 5–0 v Watford (2 May 1942)
- Biggest defeat: 1–5 v Watford (1 November 1941)
Home colours	Away colours

The 1941–42 Queens Park Rangers season was the club's 51st season of existence and their second in the South Regional Championship, part of the Wartime League. QPR finished 10th in the league.

== League standings ==
=== South Regional Championship ===
Pos	Team	Pld	W	D	L	GF	GA	Pts
9	Brentford	30	14	2	14	80	76	30
10	Queens Park Rangers	30	11	3	16	52	59	25
11	Fulham	30	10	4	16	79	99	24

=== Results ===
League South

Win Draw Loss

=== League South ===
Date	Opponents	Venue	Result	Score F–A	Scorers	Attendance	Position
30 August 1941	Brighton	A	W	5–2	Mahon,Davie 3, Pattison	3000	5
6 September 1941	Brentford	H	L	3–4	Mallett, Halford, Mahon	8000	8
13 September 1941	Crystal Palace	A	L	1–2	Halford	4500	11
20 September 1941	Fulham	H	L	2–5	Eastham 2	5500	13
27 September 1941	Tottenham Hotspur	A	L	1–3	Mangnell	5955	13
4 October 1941	Portsmouth	H	L	0–2		4000	14
11 October 1941	Chelsea	H	W	2–1	Mahon, Mallett	6000	12
18 October 1941	Charlton Athletic	A	D	0–0		5000	13
25 October 1941	West Ham United	H	L	0–2		5300	13
1 November 1941	Watford	H	L	1–5	Pattison	3000	14
8 November 1941	Aldershot	A	L	1–4	Pattison	4000	16
15 November 1941	Millwall	H	W	4–1	Stock 2, Mahon, Pattison	3500	14
22 November 1941	Arsenal	A	L	1–4	Pattison	7377	14
29 November 1941	Clapton Orient	A	D	0–0		2000	13
6 December 1941	Reading	A	D	2–2	Armstrong, Kirkham	4000	14
13 December 1941	Brighton	H	W	3–0	Mangnell 2, Armstrong	3000	14
20 December 1941	Brentford	A	L	3–4	Mangnell 2, Abel	3500	13
25 December 1941	Crystal Palace	H	L	1–3	Harris	8500	14
27 December 1941	Fulham	A	W	3–0	Moore, OG, Mangnall	3771	13
3 January 1942	Tottenham Hotspur	H	W	1–0	Mallett	4500	12
10 January 1942	Portsmouth	A	L	1–3	Mangnall	5000	13
17 January 1942	Chelsea	H	L	1–3	Mangnall	1829	14
24 January 1942	Charlton Athletic	A	L	1–3	Mangnall	2500	14
31 January 1942	West Ham United	A	W	2–1	Armstrong, Farmer	5000	12
14 February 1942	Aldershot	H	L	0–2		3086	13
21 February 1942	Millwall	A	W	2–1	Hatton 2	1000	12
28 February 1942	Arsenal	H	L	0–1		8932	12
7 March 1942	Clapton Orient	H	W	2–1	Hatton, Mangnall	2000	12
14 March 1942	Reading	H	W	4–0	Hatton 2, Mangnall 2	4000	10
2 May 1942	Watford	A	W	5–0	Heath 2, McEwan 2, Lowe	1721	10

=== London War Cup ===
Date	Opponents	Venue	Result	Score F–A	Scorers	Attendance
21 March 1942	Millwall	A	D	2–2	Hatton 2	5000
28 March 1942	Aldershot	A	W	2–0	Kirkham, Hatton	3000
4 April 1942	Brentford	H	L	1–2	Kirkham	5000
6 April 1942	Aldershot	H	L	1–2	Lowe	
11 April 1942	Brentford	A	L	0–1		7310
18 April 1942	Millwall	H	W	2–0	Hatton 2	4500

=== Friendlies ===
25-Apr-1942	Fulham	h	Friendly

== Squad ==
Position	Nationality	Name	League South Appearances	League South Goals	London War Cup Apps	London War Cup Goals	Total Appearances	Total Goals
GK	(England)	Bill Mason	19		4		23	
GK	(England)	Harry Brown	11		2		13	
DF	(England)	Arthur Jefferson	16		4		20	
DF	(England)	Ted Reay	6	2	2		8	2
DF		E Edwards	1		2		3	
DF		A Dale	1				1	
DF	(Scotland)	Louis Delaney			1		1	
DF		R Edwards			1		1	
DF		R Gunner			4		4	
DF		J Libby			1		1	
DF	(England)	Dicky March	13		2		15	
DF		McNickle	1				1	
MF	(England)	Alf Ridyard	29		3		32	
MF	(England)	Joe Mallett	18	3	2		20	3
MF	(Scotland)	Alec Farmer	20	1	5		25	1
MF	(England)	Richard Armstrong	10	3	1		11	3
MF		Campbell	5				5	
MF	(England)	Jack Mahon	15	4			15	4
MF	(England)	George Eastham	9	2			9	2
MF	(England)	Les Blizzard	14				14	
MF	(England)	Bertie Brown			1		1	
MF		Alfred Cottam	1				1	
MF	(England)	Edward Painter	3				3	
MF	(Scotland)	Tommy Paton	3				3	
MF	(England)	Albert Sibley	3		5		8	
MF	(England)	Albert Smith	6		2		8	
FW	(Scotland)	Billy McEwan	2	2	1		3	2
FW	(England)	Alec Stock	5	2			5	2
FW	(Scotland)	Johnny Pattison	16	5			2	
FW	(England)	Reg Swinfen	10		2		12	
FW	(England)	Dave Mangnall	26	12	2		28	12
FW	(England)	Albert Bonass	5		3		8	
FW	(England)	Samuel Abel	17	1	3		20	1
FW	(Scotland)	Harry Lowe	11	1	1	1	12	2fm
FW	(Scotland)	Jock Davie	2	3			2	3
FW	(England)	David Halford	6	2			6	2
FW		Leonard Ling	2				2	
FW	(England)	Cyril Hatton	5	5	4	5	9	10
FW	(England)	John Kirkham	11	1	2	2	13	3
FW	(Scotland)	Neil Harris	1	1			1	1
FW		John Moore	1	1			1	1
FW	(England)	Bill Heath	4	2	2		6	2
FW	(England)	Tommy Cheetham			1		1	
FW		R Gibbs-Kennett			1		1	
FW	(England)	Douglas Smale			2		2	

== Transfers In ==
Name	Signed from	Transfer fee	Date signed
Blizzard, Les			July 1941
Painter, Edward	Swindon	Loan	September 1941
Campbell,			October 1941
Cottam, [Alfred *]	[Hull *]		December 1941
Moore, J[ohn *]	[Gateshead *]		December 1941
Heath, Bill *			February 1942
Hatton, Cyril	Notts County	Loan	February 1942
Sibley, Albert (Joe)	Southend	Loan	March 1942
Gunner, Ronald *	Metropolitan Police		March 1942
Brown, B[ertie *]	[Barrow *]		April 1942
Gibbs-Kennet, R *			April 1942
Delaney, Louis	Nunhead		April 1942
Edwards, R			April 1942
Fitzgerald, Alf	Hearts		30 April 1942

Transfers out

Name	Signed from	Transfer fee	Date signed	Transferred to	Transf.fee	Transf.date
McCarthy, Len	Portsmouth		1 June 1937	Retired *		1941
Bott, Wilf	Newcastle	£750	6 May 1936	Lancaster City		1941
