= 1942–43 Queens Park Rangers F.C. season =

English football club season

Queens Park Rangers
1942–43 season
- Chairman: Charles W Fielding
- Manager: Ted Vizard
- Stadium: Loftus Road
- London League: 3rd
- League Cup (South) Group 2: Semi final
- Top goalscorer: League: All: Reg Swinfen 16
- Highest home attendance: 13,465 v Arsenal (20 February 1943)
- Lowest home attendance: 3,900 v Crystal Palace (19 December 1942)
- Average home league attendance: 6,141
- Biggest win: 8–1 v Clapton Orient (10 April 1943)
- Biggest defeat: 0–6 v Tottenham (5 December 1942)
Home colours	Away colours

The 1942–43 Queens Park Rangers season was the club's 52nd season of existence and their first in the London League, part of the Wartime League. QPR finished 3rd in the league, and were eliminated in the semi-final of the League Cup.

== League standings ==
=== London League ===
Pos	Team	Pld	W	D	L	GF	GA	Pts
1	Arsenal	28	21	1	6	102	40	43
2	Tottenham Hotspur	28	16	6	6	68	28	38
3	Queen's Park Rangers	28	18	2	8	64	49	38

=== Results ===
League South

Win Draw Loss

=== London League ===
Date	Opponents	Venue	Result	Score F–A	Scorers	Attendance	Position
29 August 1942	Chelsea	A	D	1–1	Mallett	6787	11
5 September 1942	Tottenham Hotspur	H	L	0–1		4300	14
12 September 1942	Clapton Orient	A	W	4–0	Mangnall, Sibley, Stock 2	1000	8
19 September 1942	Crystal Palace	A	W	1–0	Stock	5600	6
26 September 1942	Brentford	H	W	4–1	Swinfen 3, Mallett	8000	5
3 October 1942	Millwall	H	W	3–2	Hatton, Swinfen 2	4479	3
10 October 1942	Reading	A	W	2–1	Hatton, Ridyard	4000	2
17 October 1942	Luton Town	H	D	2–2	Hatton, Burley	4700	4
24 October 1942	Brighton	A	W	3–2	Burley, Swinfen, Sibley	3000	3
31 October 1942	Southampton	H	W	3–1	Swinfen, Hatton, Reay	4826	2
7 November 1942	West Ham United	H	W	5–2	Hatton, Swinfen 4	6852	1
14 November 1942	Arsenal	A	L	0–3		14,646	3
21 November 1942	Charlton Athletic	A	L	2–3	Hatton, Burley	3019	3
28 November 1942	Chelsea	H	W	4–1	Burley, Swinfen, Sibley, Hatton	8900	2
5 December 1942	Tottenham Hotspur	A	L	0–6		8295	4
12 December 1942	Clapton Orient	H	W	3–1	Mangnall 3	4493	3
19 December 1942	Crystal Palace	H	W	3–0	Hatton 2, Burley	3900	2
25 December 1942	Fulham	H	W	2–1	Mangnall, Sibley	4000	2
26 December 1942	Fulham	A	L	2–4	Ridyard, Burley	7919	2
2 January 1943	Brentford	A	L	0–2		7500	3
9 January 1943	Millwall	A	W	2–1	Mangnall, Smith	4000	2
16 January 1943	Reading	H	W	3–2	Swinfen, Mangnall 2	4800	2
23 January 1943	Luton Town	A	W	2–1	Burley, Abel	3000	2
30 January 1943	Brighton	H	L	3–4	Sibley, Mangnall 2	3900	3
6 February 1943	Southampton	A	L	2–4	Burley, Parkinson	9000	3
13 February 1943	West Ham United	A	W	3–1	Mangnall, Swinfen 2	6000	3
20 February 1943	Arsenal	H	W	3–2	Heathcote, Burley 2	13,465	3
27 February 1943	Charlton Athletic	H	W	2–0	Pattison, Heathcote	4800	3

=== League Cup South (Group 1) ===
Round	Date	Opponents	Venue	Result	Score F–A	Scorers	Attendance
1	6 March 1943	Brentford	A	W	2–1	McEwan, Burley	10,520
2	13 March 1943	Southampton	H	W	2–1	Mallett, McEwan	8,025
3	20 March 1943	Clapton Orient	A	D	1–1	Heathcote	3,000
4	27 March 1943	Brentford	H	W	2–0	Burley, Heathcote	9,954
5	3 April 1943	Southampton	A	L	1–4	Mallett	13,000
6	10 April 1943	Clapton Orient	H	W	8–1	Heathcote 4, Pattison 2, Swinfen, Burley	5,000
Semi Final	24 April 1943	Arsenal	Stamford Bridge	L	1–4	Pattison	54,508

=== Friendlies ===
17-Apr-43	Tottenham Hotspur	h	Friendly
26-Apr-43	Watford	h	Friendly

== Squad ==
Position	Nationality	Name	London League Appearances	London League Goals	League Cup South (Group 1) Apps	League Cup South (Group 1) Goals	Total Appearances	Total Goals
GK	(England)	Harry Brown	28		7		35	
DF	(England)	Arthur Jefferson	14				14	
DF	(England)	Ted Reay	12	1			12	1
DF		R Gunner	9				9	
DF	(England)	Jack Rose	7		7		14	
DF	(England)	Sam Barkas	1				1	
MF	(England)	Alf Ridyard	23	2	7		30	2
MF	(England)	Joe Mallett	24	2	6	2	30	4
MF	(Scotland)	Alec Farmer	4				4	
MF	(England)	Les Blizzard	2				2	
MF	(England)	Albert Sibley	25	5	1		26	5
MF	(England)	Albert Smith	20	1	7		27	1
MF	(England)	Ron Gadsden	3				3	
MF	(England)	Les Henley	2				2	
MF	(England)	Alec Horsfield	6				6	
MF	(Scotland)	Jimmy McInnes	1				1	
MF	(England)	Alfred ‘Nobby’ Parkinson	3	1			3	1
MF	(Wales)	Ivor Powell			3		3	
FW	(Scotland)	Billy McEwan	1		3	2	4	2
FW	(England)	Alec Stock	4	3			4	3
FW	(Scotland)	Johnny Pattison	5	1	5	3	10	4
FW	(England)	Reg Swinfen	17	15	6	1	23	16
FW	(England)	Dave Mangnall	21	11	4		25	11
FW	(England)	Samuel Abel	19	1	7		26	1
FW	(Scotland)	Harry Lowe	10				10	
FW	(England)	Cyril Hatton	15	9			15	9
FW	(England)	Bill Heath	1				1	
FW	(England)	Ben Burley	24	9	7	3	31	12
FW	(England)	William Heathcote	3	2	7	6	10	8
FW		R Beadell	2				2	
FW	(England)	Alfred Fitzgerald	1				1	
FW	(England)	George Mills	1				1	

== Transfers In ==
Name	Signed from	Transfer fee	Date signed
Shaw, Arthur *	Hounslow Town		cs1942
King, Alan *	Acton Invicta		cs1942
Beadell, Ralph *			15 September 1942
Burley, Ben	Darlington		21 September 1942
Gadsden, Ron *			3 December 1942
Rose, Jack	Peterborough		15 January 1943
Heathcote, Wilf	Millwall		February 1943
Dolding, Len *	Wealdstone		10 March 1943
DeBusser, Emiel *	Belgian Army		11 May 1943

== Transfers Out ==
Name	Signed from	Transfer fee	Date signed	Transferred to	Transf.fee	Transf.date
Delaney, Louis	Nunhead		April 1942	Arsenal		cs 1942
Edwards, R			April 1942			cs 1942
Armstrong, Dick	Bristol C	Loan	April 1942	Bristol C	Loan	cs 1942
Brown, Bertie	Barrow		April 1942	Retired *		cs 1942
Gibbs-Kennet, R *			April 1942			cs 1942
Libby, Jack *			13 December 1940			1942
Painter, Edward	Swindon	Loan	September 1941	Swindon	Loan	1942
Campbell,			October 1941			1942
Cottam, Alfred	Hull		December 1941			1942
Moore, John	Gateshead		December 1941	Retired *		1942
Hatton, Cyril	Notts County	Loan	February 1942	Notts County	Loan	December 1942
