= 1971–72 Queens Park Rangers F.C. season =

English football club season

Queens Park Rangers
1971–72 season
- Chairman: Jim Gregory
- Manager: Gordon Jago
- Stadium: Loftus Road
- Football League Second Division: 4th
- FA Cup: Fifth round
- Football League Cup: Second round
- London Challenge Cup: Semi-Finals
- Top goalscorer: League: Rodney Marsh 20; All: Rodney Marsh 23
- Highest home attendance: 25,257 Vs Norwich City 3 April 1972
- Lowest home attendance: 7,616 Vs Carlisle United 29 April 1972
- Average home league attendance: 14,556
- Biggest win: 4-1 Vs Carlisle United (11 December 1971)
- Biggest defeat: 1-3 Vs Oxford United (29 September 1971)
Home colours	Away colours

During the 1971–72 English football season, Queens Park Rangers competed in the Second Division

== Season summary ==
Despite a 12-game unbeaten run to finish the season, promotion was not achieved and QPR finished the season in 4th place. John O'Rourke was signed from Coventry City in a record fee of £60,000 (an abandoned transfer had failed in 1967 from Middlesbrough) in addition Future Republic of Ireland international Terry Mancini was signed from Leyton Orient.Late in the season wantaway England international Rodney Marsh was sold to Manchester City for a record fee for both clubs of £200,000

== Kit ==
Admiral were QPR's kit manufacturers.

== Table ==
Pos	Team	Pld	W	D	L	GF	GA	GAv	Pts	Qualification or relegation
2	Birmingham City (P)	42	19	18	5	60	31	1.935	56	Promotion to the First Division
3	Millwall	42	19	17	6	64	46	1.391	55	
4	Queens Park Rangers	42	20	14	8	57	28	2.036	54	
5	Sunderland	42	17	16	9	67	57	1.175	50	
6	Blackpool	42	20	7	15	70	50	1.400	47	Qualification for the Watney Cup

Rules for classification: 1) Points; 2) Goal average; 3) Goals scored
(P) Promoted

== Results ==
QPR scores given first

Win Draw Loss

=== Second Division ===
Date	Opponents	Venue	Result F–A	Scorers	Attendance	Position
14 August 1971	Sheffield Wednesday	H	3-0	Francis, Marsh 2	13,270	2
21 August 1971	Middlesbrough	A	2-3	McCulloch, Marsh	20,574	9
28 August 1971	Millwall	H	1-1	Marsh	16,730	10
31 August 1971	Fulham	A	3-0	Saul, McCulloch, OG	21,187	4
4 September 1971	Swindon Town	A	0-0		15,915	6
11 September 1971	Preston North End	H	2-1	Saul, McCulloch	13,578	4
18 September 1971	Burnley	A	0-1		13,770	7
25 September 1971	Watford	H	3-0	McCulloch, Marsh 2	15,698	3
29 September 1971	Oxford United	A	1-3	Busby	11,670	8
2 October 1971	Norwich City	A	0-0		22,950	8
9 October 1971	Birmingham City	H	1-0	Marsh	16,039	6
16 October 1971	Sheffield Wednesday	A	0-0		16,716	7
19 October 1971	Luton Town	H	1-0	Leach	15,858	5
23 October 1971	Blackpool	H	1-1	Marsh	16,471	6
30 October 1971	Portsmouth	H	1-1	Morgan	15,934	6
6 November 1971	Cardiff	A	0-0		16,892	4
13 November 1971	Bristol City	H	3-0	Merrick OG, Marsh, O'Rourke	14,898	3
20 November 1971	Hull City	H	2-1	O'Rourke, Morgan	12,627	3
27 November 1971	Charlton Athletic	A	1-2	Clement	16,268	3
4 December 1971	Sunderland	A	2-1	Marsh, O'Rourke	13,576	3
11 December 1971	Carlisle United	A	4-1	Marsh 2, O'Rourke, Leach	9,243	3
18 December 1971	Swindon Town	A	3-0	Marsh (17', 41'), Venables (39')	13,517	3
27 December 1971	Orient	A	0-2		19,081	3
1 January 1972	Burnley	H	3-1	Leach 2, Marsh	14,614	3
8 January 1972	Millwall	A	0-0		24,376	3
22 January 1972	Oxford United	H	4-2	Leach, Marsh 2, Saul	13,283	2
27 January 1972	Luton Town	A	1-1	Francis	17,280	3
12 February 1972	Blackpool	H	0-1		13,690	3
19 February 1972	Portsmouth	A	0-1		15,583	3
26 February 1972	Cardiff City (H)	H	PP			
4 March 1972	Bristol City	A	0-2		11,105	6
11 March 1972	Birmingham City	A	0-0		35,557	6
18 March 1972	Middlesbrough	H	1-0	Clement	11,467	5
25 March 1972	Preston North End	A	1-1	O'Rourke	12,304	5
31 March 1972	Watford	A	2-0	Evans, Salvage	14,719	5
1 April 1972	Orient	H	1-0	O'Rourke	12,042	4
3 April 1972	Norwich City	H	0-0		25,257	4
8 April 1972	Hull City	A	1-1	O'Rourke	12,830	5
15 April 1972	Charlton Athletic	H	2-0	Leach, Francis	12,976	4
22 April 1972	Sunderland	A	1-0	Busby	13,751	4
25 April 1972	Fulham	H	0-0		20,605	4
29 April 1972	Carlisle United	H	3-0	Clement, Leach, O'Rourke	7,616	4
2 May 1972	Cardiff City	H	3-0	Leach, O'Rourke, Ferguson	8,430	4

=== London Challenge Cup ===
Date	Round	Opponents	H / A	Result F–A	Scorers	Attendance
28 September 1971	First Round	Wimbledon	A	1-1		
4 October 1971	First Round Replay	Wimbledon	H	4-1		
11 October 1971	Quarter-Final	West Ham	A	1-0		
25 October 1971	Semi final	Orient	A	2-3		

=== Football League Cup ===
Date	Round	Opponents	H / A	Result F–A	Scorers	Attendance
7 September 1971	Second Round	Birmingham City (Second Division)	H	2-0	Marsh, Francis	15,032
5 October 1971	Third Round	Lincoln City (Fourth Division)	H	4-2	Marsh, McCulloch, Saul, Morgan	12,723
26 October 1971	Fourth Round	Bristol Rovers (Third Division)	H	1-1	Marsh	17,045
2 November 1971	Fourth Round Replay	Bristol Rovers (Third Division)	A	0-1		24,373

=== FA Cup ===
Date	Round	Opponents	H / A	Result F–A	Scorers	Attendance
15 January 1972	Third Round	Fulham (Second Division)	H	1-1	Mancini	23,707
18 January 1972	Third Round Replay	Fulham (Second Division)	A	1-2	Clement	24,181

=== Friendlies ===
Date	Location	Opponents	H / A	Result F–A	Scorers	Attendance
31 July 1971		Swansea City	A	2-1	Marsh, McCulloch	3,000
2 August 1971		Aldershot	H			
3 August 1971		Enfield	A	5-0	Marsh 3, Hazell, Evans	
3 August 1971		Leicester City	H			
6 August 1971		West Ham United	H	2-0	Leach, Marsh	7,030
9 November 1971		Guernsey Island XI	A			
4 February 1972		West Bromwich Albion	H	1-2	Marsh 85'	7,087
26 February 1972		Hendon	A	0-3		1,492

== Squad ==
Position	Nationality	Name	League Appearances	League Goals	Cup Appearances	F.A.Cup Goals	League.Cup Goals	Total Appearances	Total Goals
GK	(England)	Phil Parkes	42		6			48	
GK	(England)	Alan Spratley							
DF	(England)	Dave Clement	42	3	6	1		48	4
DF	(England)	Tony Hazell	42		6			42	6
DF	(England)	Ian Gillard	24		2			26	
DF	(England)	Ron Hunt	29(1)		6			36	
DF	(England)	Terry Mancini	23		2	1		25	1
DF	(England)	Ian Evans	8	1	2			10	1
DF	(England)	Ian Watson	2					2	
MF	(England)	Michael McGovern	(1)					1	
MF	(England)	Martyn Busby	28(1)	2	2			31	
MF	(England)	Mike Ferguson	16	1	1			17	1
MF	(England)	Gerry Francis	38	3	6		1	44	4
MF	(England)	Mick Leach	28(3)	7	2			33	7
MF	(England)	Ray Seary	(1)					1	
MF	(England)	Terry Venables	27		6			33	
FW	(England)	Frank Saul	18(3)	2	6		1	27	3
FW	(England)	Andy McCulloch	17(7)	4	3		1	27	5
FW	(England)	John O'Rourke	26	8	2			28	8
FW	(England)	Rodney Marsh	30	17	6		3	36	20
FW	(England)	Barry Salvage	13(3)	1				16	1
FW	(England)	Ian Morgan	9(3)	2	2		1	14	3

== Transfers In ==
Name	from	Date	Fee
Paul Everest		July 12, 1971	
Alan Mayes		July 12, 1971	
John Delve	Queens Park Rangers Juniors	July 12, 1971	
Ron Abbott	Queens Park Rangers Juniors	July 12, 1971	
Terry Mancini	Leyton Orient	October 10, 1971	£25,000
John O'Rourke	Coventry City	October 16, 1971	£60,000
John Beck	Queens Park Rangers Juniors	May 1972	
Don Givens	Luton Town	July 1972	£35,000

== Transfers Out ==
Name	from	Date	Fee	Date	Club	Fee
Alan Wilks	Chelsea	May 1965	Free	July 1971	Gillingham	£3,000
Frank Sibley	Queens Park Rangers Juniors	December 7, 1964		September 1971	Retired (Injury) (QPR Coach)	
Frank Saul	Southampton	May 13, 1970	£40,000	March 1972	Millwall	£23,000
Rodney Marsh	Fulham	March 16, 1966	£15,000	March 1972	Manchester City	£200,000

== Notes and references ==
- "Seasonal Stats – Files". QPRnet. Archived from the original on 28 November 2022.
