= 1950–51 Queens Park Rangers F.C. season =

English football club season

Queens Park Rangers
1950–51 season
- Chairman: Albert Hittinger
- Manager: Dave Mangnall
- Stadium: Loftus Road
- Football League Second Division: 16th
- FA Cup: Third Round
- London Challenge Cup: Quarter Finalist
- Top goalscorer: League: Bert Addinall 17; All: Bert Addinall 18
- Highest home attendance: 21,696 v Manchester City (2 Sept 1950)
- Lowest home attendance: 11,095 v Leicester City (23 Dec 1950)
- Biggest win: 7–1 v Grimsby Town (30 Sept 1950)
- Biggest defeat: 0–7 v Barnsley (4 Nov 1950)
Home colours	Away colours

The 1950-51 Queens Park Rangers season was the club's 60th season of existence and their 3rd in the Football League Second Division. QPR finished 16th in their league campaign, and were eliminated in the third round of the FA Cup. During this campaign, eventual record appearance holder Tony Ingham was signed from Leeds United.

== League standings ==
Pos	Team	Pld	W	D	L	GF	GA	GAv	Pts
14	Leicester City	42	15	11	16	68	58	1.172	41
15	Barnsley	42	15	10	17	74	68	1.088	40
16	Queens Park Rangers	42	15	10	17	71	82	0.866	40
17	Notts County	42	13	13	16	61	60	1.017	39
18	Swansea Town	42	16	4	22	54	77	0.701	36

Rules for classification: 1) Points; 2) Goal average; 3) Goals scored

== Results ==
QPR scores given first

Win Draw Loss

=== Second Division ===
Date	Opponents	Venue	Result F–A	Scorers	Attendance	Position
19 Aug 1950	Chesterfield	Home	1–1	C. Hatton	18381	12
24 Aug 1950	Notts County	Home	1–0	C. Hatton	15962	5
31 Aug 1950	Notts County	Away	3–3	A. Addinall (2), G. Wardle	33631	14
2 Sept 1950	Manchester City	Home	1–2	C. Hatton	21696	15
6 Sept 1950	Bury	Away	1–0	A. Addinall	8888	16
9 Sept 1950	Coventry City	Away	0–3		22298	12
16 Sept 1950	Cardiff City	Home	3–2	C. Hatton (pen), B. Heath, G. Wardle	19236	15
23 Sept 1950	Birmingham City	Away	1–1	A. Addinall	26583	13
26 Sept 1950	Leicester City	Away	2–6	A. Addinall, E. Shepherd	28911	12
30 Sept 1950	Grimsby Town	Home	7–1	A. Addinall (2), C. Hatton (2), E. Shepherd (3)	16311	11
7 Oct 1950	West Ham United	Away	1–4	A. Addinall	26375	13
14 Oct 1950	Swansea City	Home	1–1	A. Addinall	19256	12
21 Oct 1950	Luton Town	Away	0–2		15692	15
28 Oct 1950	Leeds United	Home	3–0	E. Shepherd, C. Hatton (pen), Mills	15935	12
4 Nov 1950	Barnsley	Away	0–7		17927	15
11 Nov 1950	Sheffield United	Home	2–1	C. Hatton, G. Wardle	16299	14
18 Nov 1950	Hull City	Away	1–5	C. Hatton	33866	14
25 Nov 1950	Doncaster Rovers	Home	1–2	C. Hatton	16861	16
2 Dec 1950	Brentford	Away	1–2	A. Addinall	23121	17
9 Dec 1950	Blackburn Rovers	Home	3–1	A. Addinall (2), C. Hatton (pen)	13585	16
16 Dec 1950	Chesterfield	Away	1–3	A. Addinall	7421	16
23 Dec 1950	Leicester City	Home	3–0	A. Addinall, C. Hatton, E. Shepherd	11095	16
25 Dec 1950	Preston North End	Home	1–4	B. Waugh	16881	16
26 Dec 1950	Preston North End	Away	0–1		38993	16
30 December 1950	Manchester City	A	PP			
13 Jan 1951	Coventry City	Home	3–1	A. Addinall, C. Hatton (pen), E. Shepherd	17380	16
20 Jan 1951	Cardiff City	Away	2–4	E. Shepherd (2)	21017	17
27 Jan 1951	Brentford	Home	1–1	E. Davies	26290	17
3 Feb 1951	Birmingham City	Home	2–0	D. Farrow (pen), E. Shepherd	12295	17
17 Feb 1951	Grimsby Town	Away	2–2	D. Farrow, E. Shepherd	14005	17
24 Feb 1951	West Ham United	Home	3–3	L. Clayton, D. Farrow, Duggan	21444	17
3 Mar 1951	Swansea City	Away	0–1		18611	17
10 Mar 1951	Luton Town	Home	1–1	E. Shepherd	13708	17
17 Mar 1951	Leeds United	Away	2–2	E. Shepherd, C. Smith	18094	17
23 Mar 1951	Southampton	Home	2–0	D. Farrow, C. Smith	19814	17
24 Mar 1951	Barnsley	Home	2–1	B. Waugh, C. Smith	15868	17
26 Mar 1951	Southampton	Away	2–2	A. Addinall (2)	20875	17
31 Mar 1951	Sheffield United	Away	0–2		16035	17
4 Apr 1951	Manchester City	Away	2–5	C. Hatton, C. Smith	21573	17
7 Apr 1951	Hull City	Home	3–1	D. Farrow (2), C. Smith	14628	17
14 Apr 1951	Doncaster Rovers	Away	2–0	L. Clayton, C. Smith	16344	15
21/04/1951	Brentford	A	PP			
25 Apr 1951	Blackburn Rovers	Away	1–2	C. Hatton	9770	17
5 May 1951	Bury	Home	3–2	C. Hatton, E. Shepherd, C. Smith	11244	16

=== FA Cup ===
Date	Round	Opponents	H / A	Result F–A	Scorers	Attendance
6 Jan 1951	Third Round	Millwall (Third Division South)	H	3–4	Parkinson (2), A. Addinall	25777

=== London Challenge Cup ===
Date	Round	Opponents	H / A	Result F–A	Scorers	Attendance
9 October 1950	First Round	Dulwich Hamlet	A	2–2		
16 October 1950	First Round Replay	Dulwich Hamlet	H	2–1		
23 October 1950	Quarter-Finals	Brentford	A	0–1		

=== Friendlies ===
12-Aug-50	Reds v Blues	h	Practice Match
14-Sep-50	Galatasaray	h	Friendly
10-Feb-51	British Army	Played at Arsenal	Friendly
16-Apr-51	Clyde	h	Friendly
21-Apr-51	Brentford	h	Friendly
7-May-51	S.V.V. Schiedam	h	Festival of Britain
10-May-51	La Gantoise	h	Friendly

== Squad ==
Position	Nationality	Name	League Appearances	League Goals	F..A.Cup Appearances	F.A.Cup Goals	Total Appearances	Total Goals
GK	(Scotland)	Stan Gullan	22				22	
GK	(England)	Reg Saphin	20		1		21	
GK	(England)	Dave Underwood						
DF	(England)	Des Farrow	39	6			39	6
DF	(England)	John Poppitt	33		1		34	
DF	(England)	Tony Ingham	23				23	
DF	(England)	Bill Heath	21	1	1		22	1
MF	(England)	Alf Parkinson	27		1	2	28	2
MF	(England)	Horace Woodward	25		1		26	
MF	(Scotland)	Dave Nelson	18				18	
MF	(England)	Lew Clayton	16	2			16	2
MF	(England)	Reg Chapman	16				16	
DF	(England)	George Powell	8				8	
MF	(Wales)	Brian Nicholas	5		1		6	
MF	(Scotland)	Bobby Cameron	1				1	
FW	(England)	Ernie Shepherd	41	14	1		42	14
FW	(England)	Bert Addinall	38	17	1	1	39	18
FW	(England)	Cyril Hatton	27	16	1		28	16
FW	(Scotland)	Billy Waugh	25	2	1		26	2
FW	(England)	Don Mills	18	1			18	1
FW	(England)	George Wardle	14	3			14	3
FW	(England)	Ted Duggan	12	1	1		13	1
FW	(England)	Conway Smith	9	7			9	7
FW	(Scotland)	George Stewart	1				1	
FW	(Scotland)	Billy Muir	1				1	
FW	(Scotland)	Johnny McKay	1				1	
FW	(England)	Eddie Davies	1	1			1	1

== Transfers in ==
Name	from	Date	Fee
Pat Woods	Queens Park Rangers Juniors	July 1950	
Billy Waugh	Luton	July 1950	£6,000
Ernie Shepherd	Hull	July 1950	
Lew Clayton	Barnsley	August 15, 1950	£3,000
John Poppitt	Derby County	September 6, 1950	
George Hitch		December 1950	
Mike Powell	Queens Park Rangers Juniors	January 23, 1951	
Glyn Davies		March 1951	
Conway Smith	Huddersfield Town	March 16, 1951	
William Hill	Uxbridge Town	April 1951	
Tony Richardson	Slough Sports Club	April 1951	

== Transfers out ==
Name	from	Date	Fee	Date	Club	Fee
Stan Hudson	West Ham United	September 1948		July 1950	Retired	
Reg Dudley	Millwall	December 1946		July 1950	Watford	£200
David Aitchison	Erith Technical Institute	September 26, 1949		July 1950	Ramsgate	
Tommy Best	Cardiff City	December 1949		July 1950	Hereford United	
Albert Smith	Shirley Jnrs	May 24, 1939		August 1950	Ashford Town	
Frank Neary	Leyton Orient	October 1949	£7,000	August 1950	Millwall	£6,000
Charlie (Midge) Hill	Torquay	March 16, 1949		September 1950	Swindon	
Stan Hudson		25 September 1948		September? 1950	Retired (illness, d. June 51)	
Charlie Hill	Torquay United	March 1949		September 1950	Swindon Town	
Don Mills	Maltby Main	August 17, 1946		February 1951	Cardiff City	£12,500
