= 1972–73 Queens Park Rangers F.C. season =

English football club season

Queens Park Rangers
1972–73 season
- Chairman: Jim Gregory
- Manager: Gordon Jago
- Football League Second Division: 2nd
- FA Cup: Fifth round
- Football League Cup: Second round
- London Challenge Cup: Quarter-Finals
- Top goalscorer: League: Don Givens (23); All: Don Givens (26)
- Highest home attendance: 22,518 Vs Burnley (27 January 1973)
- Lowest home attendance: 9,790 Vs Oxford United (2 December 1972)
- Average home league attendance: 14,714
- Biggest win: 5–0 Vs Portsmouth (31 March 1973), Swindon Town (17 February 1973)
- Biggest defeat: 1–4 Vs Hull City (26 September 1972)
Home colours	Away colours

The 1972–73 season was Queens Park Rangers F.C.'s 54th season of football in the Football League First Division.

== League performance ==
QPR finished the season in 2nd place in the Football League First Division, and achieved promotion to the first division

== FA Cup ==
QPR were eliminated from the FA Cup in the Fifth Round, losing 4-2 away to Derby County.

== Crest ==
QPR replaced their Metropolitan Borough of Hammersmith’s arms badge that had been the clubs badge since 1953 with a blue and white hooped shield with the outline of a ball, depicting QPR in plain letters.

== Results ==
=== Second Division ===
Pos	Team	Pld	W	D	L	GF	GA	GAv	Pts	Qualification or relegation
1	Burnley (C, P)	42	24	14	4	72	35	2.057	62	Promotion to the First Division
2	Queens Park Rangers (P)	42	24	13	5	81	37	2.189	61	Promotion to the First Division
3	Aston Villa	42	18	14	10	51	47	1.085	50	
4	Middlesbrough	42	17	13	12	46	43	1.070	47	
5	Bristol City	42	17	12	13	63	51	1.235	46	Qualification for the Watney Cup

Rules for classification: 1) Points; 2) Goal average; 3) Goals scored
(C) Champions; (P) Promoted

== Results ==
=== First Division ===
Date	Opponents	Venue	Result F–A	Scorers	Attendance	Position
12 August 1972	Swindon Town	A	2–2	Busby 28', Leach 74'	14,170	11
19 August 1972	Sheffield Wednesday	H	4–2	Francis, O'Rourke, Givens, Leach	12,977	7
26 August 1972	Preston North End	A	1–1	O'Rourke	9,242	8
29 August 1972	Fulham	A	pp			
2 September 1972	Middlesbrough	H	2–2	Givens, O'Rourke	10,601	9
9 September 1972	Burnley	A	1–1	Busby	10,798	10
16 September 1972	Nottingham Forest	H	3–0	Givens 2', Bowles 32', McCulloch	12,528	8
19 September 1972	Bristol City	H	1–1	Francis	11,586	8
23 September 1972	Orient	A	2–2	Leach, Bowles	9,492	6
26 September 1972	Hull City	A	1–4	Givens	8,289	10
30 September 1972	Cardiff City	H	3–0	Givens 2, Bowles	11,182	6
7 October 1972	Carlisle United	H	4–0	Francis, Leach, Evans, Busby	11,755	4
14 October 1972	Aston Villa	A	1–0	Francis 61'	34,045	3
17 October 1972	Fulham	A	2–0	Bowles, Givens	20,614	2
21 October 1972	Sunderland	H	3–2	Givens, Bowles 2	17,356	2
28 October 1972	Blackpool	A	0–2		14,160	2
4 November 1972	Hull City	H	1–1	Bowles	13,619	2
11 November 1972	Bristol City	A	2–1	Givens 2	12,570	2
18 November 1972	Millwall	H	1–3	Bowles	15,857	2
25 November 1972	Portsmouth	A	1–0	Givens	8,460	2
2 December 1972	Oxford United	H	0–0		9,790	2
9 December 1972	Luton Town	A	2–2	Givens, Clement	13,670	2
16 December 1972	Huddersfield Town	H	pp			
23 December 1972	Brighton And Hove Albion	A	2–1	Givens 2	13,735	2
26 December 1972	Orient	H	3–1	Leach, Givens, Francis	15,062	2
30 December 1972	Sheffield Wednesday	A	1–3	Leach	20,185	2
6 January 1973	Preston North End	H	3–0	Givens 2, Francis	10,519	2
20 January 1973	Middlesbrough	A	0–0		8,398	2
27 January 1973	Burnley	H	2–0	Givens, leach	22,518	2
6 February 1973	Huddersfield Town	H	3–1	Givens 2, Thomas	13,539	2
10 February 1973	Nottingham Forest	A	0–0		11,617	2
17 February 1973	Swindon Town	H	5–0	Francis (5'), Bowles (43', 59', 68'), Givens (88')	13,472	2
24 February 1973	Huddersfield Town	A	pp			
3 March 1973	Carlisle United	A	3–1	Thomas, Bowles, Clement	8,729	2
6 March 1973	Huddersfield Town	A	2–2	Francis, Leach	8,627	2
10 March 1973	Aston Villa	H	1–0	Leach 47'	21,578	1
17 March 1973	Sunderland	A	pp			
24 March 1973	Blackpool	H	4–0	Thomas, Bowles, Francis, Hatton OG	15,714	2
31 March 1973	Portsmouth	H	5–0	Thomas, Leach, Venables, Lewis OG	14,086	2
2 April 1973	Sunderland	A	pp			
7 April 1973	Oxford United	A	0–2		12,144	2
14 April 1973	Luton Town	H	2–0	Mancini, Givens	16,471	2
18 April 1973	Cardiff City	A	0–0		11,958	2
21 April 1973	Millwall	A	1–0	Bowles	16,136	2
24 April 1973	Brighton and Hove Albion	H	2–0	Bowles, Francis	16,625	2
28 April 1973	Fulham	H	2–0	Bowles, Clement	22,187	2
9 May 1973	Sunderland	A	3–0	Bowles 2, Thomas	43,265	2

=== London Challenge Cup ===
Date	Round	Opponents	H / A	Result F–A	Scorers	Attendance
25 September 1972	First Round	Crystal Palace	A	1–0		
4 October 1972	Quarter-Final	Tottenham	A	0–2		

=== FA Cup ===
Date	Round	Opponents	H / A	Result F–A	Scorers	Attendance
13 January 1973	Third Round	Barnet (Southern Football League Premier Division)	H	0–0		13,627
16 January 1973	Third Round Replay	Barnet (Southern Football League Premier Division)	A	3–0	Leach, Bowles, Mancini	10.919
24 January 1973	Fourth Round	Oxford United (Second Division)	A	2–0	Givens, Clement	16,057
24 February 1973	Fifth Round	Derby County (First Division)	A	2–4	Leach, Givens	38,100

=== Football League Cup ===
Date	Round	Opponents	H / A	Result F–A	Scorers	Attendance
6 September 1972	Second Round	West Bromwich Albion (First Division)	A	1–2	Givens	8,282

=== Friendlies ===
Date	Location	Opponents	H / A	Result F–A	Scorers	Attendance
17 July 1972	Norway	Viking FC (NOR)	A			
19 July 1972	Norway	Alesund (NOR)	A			
22 July 1972	Norway	Clausengen (NOR)	A			
24 July 1972	Norway	Rosenborg (NOR)	A			
29 July 1972		Brighton and Hove Albion	A			
7 August 1972		Vale Recreation	A			
12 December 1972	Frank Sibley Testimonial	Manchester City	H	0-1		
30 April 1973	Charlie Hall Testimonial	Charlton Athletic	A			

== Squad ==
Position	Nationality	Name	League Appearances	League Goals	Cup Appearances	F.A.Cup Goals	League.Cup Goals	Total Appearances	Total Goals
GK	(England)	Phil Parkes	41		4			45	
GK	(England)	Alan Spratley	1		1			2	
DF	(England)	Dave Clement	40	3	5	1		45	4
DF	(England)	Tony Hazell	41		5			46	
DF	(England)	Ian Gillard	8					8	
DF	(England)	Ron Hunt	2(1)		1			4	
DF	(England)	Terry Mancini	24	2	4	1		28	3
DF	(England)	Ian Evans	18	1	1			19	1
DF	(England)	John Delve	6(3)		1			10	
MF	(England)	John Beck	(1)					1	
MF	(England)	Martyn Busby	13	3	1			14	3
MF	(England)	Mike Ferguson	1(1)		2			4	
MF	(England)	Gerry Francis	42	9	4			46	9
MF	(England)	Mick Leach	35(1)	10	5	2		41	12
MF	(England)	Ian Watson	35		4			39	
FW	(England)	Terry Venables	37	1	2			39	1
FW	(England)	Stan Bowles	35	17	4	1		33	18
FW	(England)	Andy McCulloch	5(2)	1				7	1
FW	(England)	John O'Rourke	7(1)	3	1			9	3
FW	(Republic of Ireland)	Don Givens	41	23	5	2	1	46	26
FW	(England)	Dave Thomas	28	6	4			32	6
FW	(England)	Barry Salvage	(3)		1			4	
FW	(England)	Ian Morgan	2					2	

== Transfers out ==
Name	from	Date	Fee	Date	Club	Fee
Andrew McCulloch	Walton & Hersham	October 1970		October 1972	Cardiff City	£45,000
Michael McGovern	Queens Park Rangers Juniors	November 1968		November 1972	Watford	Loan
Barry Salvage	Millwall	February 18, 1971	Free	February 1973	Brentford	
Michael McGovern	Queens Park Rangers Juniors	November 1968		February 1973	Swindon	£10,000
Ron Hunt	Queens Park Rangers Juniors	March 1963		March 1973	Retired (Injury)	
John McCormick	Crystal P	March 10, 1973	Loan	May 1973	Crystal P	Loan
Paul Everest		July 12, 1971		May 1973		Free

== Transfers in ==
Name	from	Date	Fee
Don Givens	Luton	July 20, 1972	£38,000
Stan Bowles	Carlisle United	September 15, 1972	£112,000
Dave Thomas	Burnley	October 20, 1972	£165,000
Gary Williams		November 1972	
John McCormick	Crystal P	March 10, 1973	Loan
Mike French		May 1973	
Frank McLintock	Arsenal	June 4, 1973	£25,000
