= 1970–71 Queens Park Rangers F.C. season =

English football club season

Queens Park Rangers
1970–71 season
- Chairman: Jim Gregory
- Manager: Les Allen (until 4 January); Gordon Jago (from 6 January)
- Stadium: Loftus Road
- Football League Second Division: 11th
- FA Cup: Third round
- Football League Cup: Third round
- London Challenge Cup: Round One
- Top goalscorer: League: Rodney Marsh 21; All: Rodney Marsh 23
- Highest home attendance: 19,273 Vs Luton Town (29 September 1970)
- Lowest home attendance: 8,613 Vs Bolton Wanderers (3 April 1971)
- Average home league attendance: 12,862
- Biggest win: 5-1 Vs Orient (3 October 1970)
- Biggest defeat: 2-6 Vs Middlesbrough (26 September 1970)
Home colours	Away colours

During the 1970–71 English football season, Queens Park Rangers competed in the Second Division.

== Season summary ==
Queens Park Rangers finished the season in 11th place.

== Kit ==
Admiral were QPR's kit manufacturers.

== Table ==
Pos	Team	Pld	W	D	L	GF	GA	GAv	Pts
9	Birmingham City	42	17	12	13	58	48	1.208	46
10	Norwich City	42	15	14	13	54	52	1.038	44
11	Queens Park Rangers	42	16	11	15	58	53	1.094	43
12	Swindon Town	42	15	12	15	61	51	1.196	42
13	Sunderland	42	15	12	15	52	54	0.963	42

Rules for classification: 1) Points; 2) Goal average; 3) Goals scored

== Results ==
QPR scores given first

Win Draw Loss

=== Second Division ===
Date	Opponents	Venue	Result F–A	Scorers	Attendance	Position
15 August 1970	Birmingham City	A	1-2	Bridges	30,785	19
22 August 1970	Leicester City	H	1-3	Venables	17,090	21
29 August 1970	Bolton Wanderers	A	2-2	Venables 2	10,485	21
2 September 1970	Blackburn Rovers	A	2-0	Leach, Saul	7,783	17
5 September 1970	Watford	H	1-1	Venables	18,656	18
12 September 1970	Sheffield Wednesday	A	0-1		14,860	20
19 September 1970	Bristol City	H	2-1	Marsh, Bridges	13,367	17
26 September 1970	Middlesbrough	A	2-6	Clement, Marsh	16.788	20
29 September 1970	Luton Town	H	0-1		19,273	20
3 October 1970	Orient	H	5-1	Marsh 2, Morgan 2, Venables	14,500	18
10 October 1970	Swindon Town	A	0-1		17,465	19
17 October 1970	Birmingham City	H	5-2	Marsh 3, Venables, McCulloch	13,074	15
21 October 1970	Oxford United	A	3-1	Venables, Ferguson, Francis	15,194	11
24 October 1970	Portsmouth	H	2-0	Clement, Morgan	16,049	9
31 October 1970	Millwall	A	0-3		16,012	11
7 November 1970	Cardiff City	H	0-1		14,268	14
14 November 1970	Sheffield United	A	1-1	Hunt	19,672	15
21 November 1970	Hull City	A	1-1	Leach	15,606	15
28 November 1970	Charlton Athletic	H	1-4	Leach	14,027	15
5 December 1970	Sunderland	A	1-3	Leach	14,721	15
12 December 1970	Carlisle United	H	1-1	Marsh	8,884	15
19 December 1970	Leicester City	A	0-0		31,843	16
26 December 1970	Norwich City	A	PP			
9 January 1971	Luton Town	A	0-0		22,024	16
16 January 1971	Oxford United	H	2-0	Francis, Marsh	10,909	15
30 January 1971	Charlton Athletic	A	PP			
6 February 1971	Sunderland	H	2-0	Leach, Venables	11,707	15
13 February 1971	Carlisle United	A	0-3		9,074	15
20 February 1971	Hull City	H	1-1	Marsh	13,418	15
27 February 1971	Millwall	H	2-0	Francis, Marsh	15,698	14
6 March 1971	Portsmouth	A	0-2		10,402	16
13 March 1971	Sheffield United	H	2-2	Marsh 2	12,317	16
17 March 1971	Cardiff City	A	0-1		23,309	17
23 March 1971	Norwich City	H	0-1		9,927	17
27 March 1971	Watford	A	2-1	Marsh 2	16,625	17
3 April 1971	Bolton Wanderers	H	4-0	Marsh 35', 62' pen, 77' Leach 87'	8,613	15
6 April 1971	Sheffield Wednesday	H	1-0	Marsh	11,378	12
10 April 1971	Norwich City	A	0-3		15,651	15
12 April 1971	Orient	A	1-0	McCulloch	11,949	14
17 April 1971	Swindon Town	H	4-2	Clement (30'), Venables (35', 39'), McCulloch (73')	11,571	14
20 April 1971	Charlton Athletic	A	3-0	McCulloch 2, Marsh	16,138	11
23 April 1971	Bristol City	A	0-0		12,522	12
27 April 1971	Blackburn Rovers	H	2-0	Francis, Marsh	9.343	11
1 May 1971	Middlesbrough	H	1-1	Francis	10,390	11

=== London Challenge Cup ===
Date	Round	Opponents	H / A	Result F–A	Scorers	Attendance
30 September 1970	First Round	Arsenal	A	0-0		
7 October 1970	First Round Replay	Arsenal	H	0-1*aet		

=== Football League Cup ===
Date	Round	Opponents	H / A	Result F–A	Scorers	Attendance
8 September 1970	Second Round	Cardiff City (Second Division)	H	4-0	Marsh, Saul, Venables, Bridges	15,025
6 October 1970	Third Round	Fulham (Third Division)	A	0-2		31,729

=== FA Cup ===
Date	Round	Opponents	H / A	Result F–A	Scorers	Attendance
2 January 1971	Third Round	Swindon Town (Second Division)	A	1-2	Marsh 83' pen	14,840

=== Friendlies ===
Date	Location	Opponents	H / A	Result F–A	Scorers	Attendance
3 August 1970		Torquay United	A			
5 August 1970		Bournemouth and Boscombe Athletic	A			
8 August 1970		Southampton	A			
23 February 1971		Brighton and Hove Albion	A			
3 May 1971	Les Allen Testimonial	London XI	H			
23 May 1971	Spain	Sabadell (ESP)	A			
31 May 1971	Spain	Español (ESP)	A			

== Squad ==
Position	Nationality	Name	League Appearances	League Goals	F A Cup Appearances	F A Cup Goals	League Cup Appearances	League.Cup Goals	Total Appearances	Total Goals
GK	(England)	Phil Parkes	41		1		2		44	
GK	(England)	Alan Spratley	1						1	
DF	(England)	Dave Clement	42	3	1		2		45	3
DF	(England)	Tony Hazell	33(2)				2		37	
DF	(England)	Ian Gillard	17						17	
DF	(England)	Ron Hunt	37	1	1		2		40	1
DF	(England)	Frank Sibley	19		1		1		21	
DF	(England)	Ian Evans	8						8	
DF	(England)	Ian Watson	15(1)		1		1		18	
MF	(England)	Allan Harris	6(1)						7	
MF	(England)	Alan Wilks	2(1)						3	
MF	(England)	Martyn Busby	12(2)		1		1(1)		17	
MF	(England)	Mike Ferguson	30	1			2		32	1
MF	(England)	Gerry Francis	35(3)	5	1		1		40	5
MF	(England)	Mick Leach	25	6	1				26	6
MF	(England)	Vic Mobley	3				1		4	
MF	(England)	Mick McGovern	5(1)		1				7	
FW	(England)	Terry Venables	37(1)	10	1		2	1	41	11
FW	(England)	Frank Saul	22	1			1	1	23	2
FW	(England)	Andy McCulloch	8(5)	5					13	5
FW	(England)	Barry Bridges	7	2			1	1	8	3
FW	(England)	Rodney Marsh	39	21	1	1	2	1	42	23
FW	(England)	Barry Salvage	3						3	
FW	(England)	Ian Morgan	15(4)	3			1		20	3

== Transfers In ==
Name	from	Date	Fee
Martyn Busby		July 1970	
Ray Seary	Queens Park Rangers Juniors	September 1970	
Andrew McCulloch	Walton & Hersham	October 1970	
Barry Salvage	Millwall	February 18, 1971	Free

== Transfers Out ==
Name	from	Date	Fee	Date	Club	Fee
Bob Turpie	Queens Park Rangers Juniors	November 1967		July 1970	Peterborough United	
Mike Kelly	Wimbledon	March 16, 1966	£4,000	August 1970	Birmingham	£18,000
Barry Bridges	Birmingham City	August 21, 1968	£50,000	September 1970	Millwall	£40,000
Alan Collman		July ?1969		September 1970		
Eddie Lane		July ?1969		November? 1970		
Allan Harris	Chelsea	July 1967	£30,000	March 1971	Plymouth Argyle	£9,500
Vic Mobley	Sheffield W	October 1, 1969	£55,000	March 1971	Retired (Injury)	
Steve Tom		February 5, 1969		June 1971	Brentford	Free
