= 1969–70 Queens Park Rangers F.C. season =

English football club season

Queens Park Rangers
1969–70 season
- Chairman: Jim Gregory
- Manager: Les Allen
- Football League Second Division: 9th
- FA Cup: Sixth Round
- Football League Cup: Fifth Round
- London Challenge Cup: Quarter-Finals
- Top goalscorer: League: Barry Bridges 21; All: Rodney Marsh / Barry Bridges 23
- Highest home attendance: 22,799 Vs Swindon Town 20 September 1969
- Lowest home attendance: 11,017 Vs Bristol City 28 March 1970
- Average home league attendance: 17,525
- Biggest win: 6–0 Vs Tranmere Rovers (23 September)
- Biggest defeat: 0–4 Bolton Wanderers (14 March 1970)
Home colours	Away colours

During the 1969–70 English football season, Queens Park Rangers competed in the Second Division

== Season summary ==
In their return to the second division QPR finished the season in 9th place – only 1 win in the last ten games of the season dropped QPR from second to a ninth-place finish.Late rounds of both major cup competitions were reached -losing in both to first division teams.

== Table ==
Pos	Team	Pld	W	D	L	GF	GA	GAv	Pts	Qualification or relegation
7	Cardiff City	42	18	13	11	61	41	1.488	49	Qualification for the Cup Winners' Cup first round (Note: Cardiff City qualified for the European Cup Winners' Cup as the 1969-70 Welsh Cup winners.)
8	Blackburn Rovers	42	20	7	15	54	50	1.080	47	
9	Queens Park Rangers	42	17	11	14	66	57	1.158	45	
10	Millwall	42	15	14	13	56	56	1.000	44	
11	Norwich City	42	16	11	15	49	46	1.065	43	

Rules for classification: 1) Points; 2) Goal average; 3) Goals scored

== Results ==
QPR scores given first

Win Draw Loss

=== Second Division ===
Date	Opponents	Venue	Result F–A	Scorers	Attendance	Position
9 August 1969	Hull City	H	3–0	Clarke, Clark, Leach	15,781	1
16 August 1969	Preston North End	A	0–0		11,181	7
20 August 1969	Watford	A	1–0	Bridges	27,968	4
23 August 1969	Millwall	H	3–2	Bridges 2, Clement	19,735	1
26 August 1969	Blackpool	H	6–1	Marsh 3, Bridges 2, Venables	19,231	1
30 August 1969	Birmingham	A	0–3		32,660	5
6 September 1969	Huddersfield Town	H	4–2	Morgan, Marsh, Bridges, Venables	18,746	3
13 September 1969	Portsmouth	A	3–1	Clement, Francis, Bridges	22,169	2
17 September 1969	Blackburn Rovers	A	1–0	Leach	15,945	1
20 September 1969	Swindon Town	H	2–0	Wilks (14'), Clarke (19' pen)	22,799	1
27 September 1969	Cardiff City	A	2–4	Venables, Bridges	30.083	1
4 October 1969	Middlesbrough	H	4–0	Bridges 2, Clarke, Clement	21,421	1
7 October 1969	Preston North End	H	0–0		21,127	2
11 October 1969	Norwich City	A	0–1		20.040	2
18 October 1969	Carlisle United	A	2–3	Clement, Clarke	11,900	3
25 October 1969	Charlton Athletic	H	1–1	Metchick	20,577	3
1 November 1969	Aston Villa	A	1–1	Marsh 44'	31,525	3
8 November 1969	Sheffield United	H	2–1	Bridges, Clarke	19,852	3
11 November 1969	Watford	H	2–1	Clarke, Hazell	19,719	2
15 November 1969	Bristol City	A	0–2		18,893	3
22 November 1969	Leicester City	H	1–1	Bridges	21,027	3
29 November 1969	Bolton Wanderers	A	4–6	Leach, Bridges, Clement, Marsh	7,253	5
6 December 1969	Oxford United	H	1–2	Bridges	12,018	5
13 December 1969	Portsmouth	H	2–0	Clarke, Bridges	11,831	4
26 December 1969	Millwall	A	0–2		13,952	4
27 December 1969	Birmingham	H	2–1	Bridges 2	15,668	4
10 January 1970	Swindon Town	A	0–0		18,448	5
17 January 1970	Cardiff City	H	2–1	Gillard, Marsh	22,033	5
20 January 1970	Huddersfield Town	A	0–2		21,699	5
31 January 1970	Middlesbrough	A	0–1		25,821	5
14 February 1970	Hull City	A	2–1	Marsh, Clarke	12,698	2
17 February 1970	Norwich City	H	4–0	Venables, Marsh, Clarke, Bridges	17,270	2
24 February 1970	Sheffield United	A	0–2		25,724	4
28 February 1970	Aston Villa	H	4–2	Marsh 13',66', Bridges 5', 88'	17,057	2
7 March 1970	Leicester City	A	pp			
14 March 1970	Bolton Wanderers	H	0–4		13,596	3
21 March 1970	Oxford United	A	0–0		13,828	7
27 March 1970	Carlisle United	H	0–0		16,343	8
28 March 1970	Bristol City	H	2–2	Bridges, Francis	11,017	8
31 March 1970	Charlton Athletic	A	1–1	Watson	13,790	8
4 April 1970	Blackpool	A	1–1	Leach	19,516	8
14 April 1970	Blackburn Rovers	H	2–3	Venables, Hazell	11,161	9
18 April 1970	Leicester City	A	1–2	Marsh	20,391	9

=== London Challenge Cup ===
Date	Round	Opponents	H / A	Result F–A	Scorers	Attendance
29 September 1969	First Round	Chelsea	A	1–0		
13 October 1969	Quarter-Finals	Arsenal	A	1–3		

=== Football League Cup ===
Date	Round	Opponents	H / A	Result F–A	Scorers	Attendance
3 September 1969	Second Round	Mansfield Town (Third Division)	A	2–2	Bridges, Watson	9,759
9 September 1969	Second Round Replay	Mansfield Town (Third Division)	H	4–0	Marsh, Clarke, Clement, Venables	17,315
23 September 1969	Third Round	Tranmere Rovers (Third Division)	H	6–0	Marsh 4, Clarke, Leach	17,477
15 October 1969	Fourth Round	Wolverhampton Wanderers (First Division)	H	3–1	Clarke 2, Bridges	29,971
29 October 1969	Fifth Round	Manchester City (First Division)	A	0–3		42,058

=== FA Cup ===
Date	Round	Opponents	H / A	Result F–A	Scorers	Attendance
3 January 1970	Third Round	South Shields (Northern Premier League)	A	4–1	Marsh 2, Clarke, Ferguson	16,811
24 January 1970	Fourth Round	Charlton Athletic (Second Division)	A	3–2	Marsh 2, Clarke	30,262
7 February 1970	Fifth Round	Derby County (First Division)	H	1–0	Mackay. OG	27,685
21 February 1970	Sixth Round	Chelsea (First Division)	H	2–4	Bridges 62', Venables 27' (pen)	33,572

=== Friendlies ===
Date	Location	Opponents	H / A	Result F–A	Scorers	Attendance
28-Jul-1969		Colchester United	A			
2-Aug-1969		Glasgow Rangers	H			
7-May-1970	Spain	Calella	A			
10-May-1970	Spain	Español	A			

== Squad ==
Position	Nationality	Name	League Appearances	League Goals	Cup Appearances	F.A.Cup Goals	League.Cup Goals	Total Appearances	Total Goals
GK	(England)	Mick Kelly	28		8			36	
GK	(England)	Alan Spratley	14		1			15	
DF	(England)	Dave Clement	33(2)	5	9		1	42	6
DF	(England)	Tony Hazell	42	2	9			51	2
DF	(England)	Ian Gillard	14(1)	1	5			20	1
DF	(England)	Ron Hunt	21(1)		3			25	
DF	(England)	Frank Sibley	13(1)		2			16	
DF	(England)	Allan Harris	13(3)					16	
DF	(England)	Ian Watson	35	1	9		1	44	2
MF	(England)	Alan Wilks	6	1	1			7	1
MF	(England)	Vic Mobley	21(1)		5			27	
MF	(England)	Martyn Busby	1					1	
MF	(England)	Gerry Francis	9(1)	2	1			11	2
MF	(England)	Mick Leach	30(2)	4	6		1	38	5
MF	(England)	Bob Turpie	1(1)					2	
MF	(England)	Terry Venables	34	5	8	1	1	42	7
MF	(England)	Mike Ferguson	20		4	1		24	1
FW	(England)	Frank Clarke	31(1)	9	6	2	4	38	15
FW	(England)	Mick McGovern	3					3	
FW	(England)	Clive Clark	7(1)	1	2			10	1
FW	(England)	Barry Bridges	38	21	8	1	2	46	24
FW	(England)	Rodney Marsh	38	12	9	4	5	47	21
FW	(England)	Ian Morgan	11(2)	1	2			15	1
FW	(England)	Dave Metchick	(1)	1	1			2	1

== Transfers In ==
Name	from	Date	Fee
Eddie Lane *		July ?1969	
Gerry Francis		July 1, 1969	
Alan Collman *		July ?1969	
Vic Mobley	Sheffield Wednesday	October 1, 1969	£50,000
Mike Ferguson	Aston Villa	November 20, 1969	£15,000
Ian Evans	Queens Park Rangers Juniors	January 1970	
Martyn Busby	Queens Park Rangers Juniors	April 1970	
Frank Saul	Southampton	May 13, 1970	£40,000
Phil Parkes	Walsall	June 23, 1970	£15,000

== Transfers Out ==
Name	from	Date	Fee	Date	Club	Fee
Bobby Finch		August 1966		August 1969	Durban City (S.Afr.)	
Keith Sanderson	Plymouth Argyle	June 1965	£4,000	October 1969	Goole Town	
Joe Nixon *		June 10, 1969		November 1969		
Clive Clark	West Bromwich Albion	June 20, 1969	player plus £70,000 for Allan Glover	January 1970	Preston North End	£25,000
Frank Clarke	Shrewsbury	February 21, 1968	£34,000	March 1970	Ipswich	£40,000
Dave Metchick	Peterborough	August 1968	£5,000	May 1970	Atlanta Chiefs (USA)	Free
Ron Springett	Sheffield W	May 22, 1967	£16,000	June 1970	Ashford Town	Free
