= Archie McFeat =

Scottish footballer

Personal information
- Full name: Archibald McFeat
- Date of birth: 23 January 1924
- Place of birth: Stirling, Scotland
- Date of death: 1 April 1996 (aged 72)
- Place of death: Falkirk, Scotland
- Position: Goalkeeper

Senior career*
Years	Team	Apps	(Gls)
1946–1947	Morton	35	(0)
1947–1948	Dumbarton	7	(0)
1948–1949	Torquay United	9	(0)
1949–1952	Albion Rovers	62	(0)
1952–1954	Falkirk	46	(0)
1954–1958	Stenhousemuir	54	(0)
Total		213	(0)
- * Club domestic league appearances and goals

Archie McFeat (23 January 1924 – 1 April 1996) was a Scottish professional footballer, who played as a goalkeeper.

He played for Morton and Dumbarton before switching to English football, moving to Torquay United, although he only made nine appearances for the club. In his last game for Torquay, McFeat was knocked unconscious by a shot from Frank Neary in the 3–1 defeat at Leyton Orient on 20 November 1948.

Returning to Scotland, McFeat joined Albion Rovers. In November 1952 he was signed by Falkirk manager Bob Shankly, and stayed with the Bairns until 1954, when he joined Stenhousemuir.
