= Ray Seary =

English footballer

Personal information
- Full name: Raymond Michael Seary
- Date of birth: 18 September 1952
- Place of birth: Slough, England
- Date of death: 5 December 2001 (aged 49)
- Place of death: Histon, England
- Height: 5 ft 10 in (1.78 m)
- Position: Left-back

Youth career
- –1971: Queens Park Rangers

Senior career*
Years	Team	Apps	(Gls)
1971–1974	Queens Park Rangers	1	(0)
1974–1976	Cambridge United	57	(0)
1976–1977	King's Lynn		
Total		58	(0)
- * Club domestic league appearances and goals

Raymond Michael Seary (18 September 1952 – 5 December 2001) was an English professional footballer who played as a left-back.
