= George Dale (footballer) =

English footballer

Personal information
- Full name: George Herbert Dale
- Date of birth: 2 May 1892
- Place of birth: Belvedere, Kent, England
- Date of death: 28 October 1961 (aged 69)
- Position: Inside forward

Senior career*
Years	Team	Apps	(Gls)
- Clapton
- Plumstead St John's
- Dartford
- Newark Stanley Works
- New Crusaders
	Notts County	18	(5)
	Queens Park Rangers	110	(40)
1919–1922	Chelsea	49	(1)
- Taunton United
- Weymouth
- Vickers
Total		177	(46)
- * Club domestic league appearances and goals

George Herbert Dale (2 May 1892 – 28 October 1961) was an English professional footballer who played as an inside forward.

== Club career ==
Born in Belvedere, Kent, Dale started his professional career with Notts County, where he would score five goals in eighteen appearances. He moved to Queens Park Rangers, where he would go on to score forty goals in 110 games.

He went on to play for Chelsea, where he made 49 appearances, scoring once.
