= Fred Ryder =

Australian rules footballer

Personal information
- Full name: Frederick Albert Henry Ryder
- Born: 7 March 1902; New Norfolk, Tasmania
- Died: 28 March 1974 (aged 72); South Australia
- Original team: Devonport / North Hobart

Playing career^{1}
Years	Club	Games (Goals)
1926	South Melbourne	1 (0)
- ^{1} Playing statistics correct to the end of 1926.

Frederick Albert Henry Ryder (7 March 1902 – 28 March 1974) was an Australian rules footballer who played with South Melbourne in the Victorian Football League (VFL).
