= Southern Professional Floodlit Cup =

Association football competition in England

The Southern Professional Floodlit Cup was an association football competition played in the late 1950s, which involved clubs from London, South East England and a small number of teams from the Midlands. The competition started in the 1955–56 season with ten clubs competing and in its final season, 1959–60, the number of entrants had increased to 18. The inaugural competition was won by West Ham United with the other winners being Luton Town, Portsmouth, Arsenal and Coventry City. In 1960, the competition gave way to the Football League Cup which was open to clubs throughout the Football League.

== Format ==
The competition operated on a straight knockout basis with all ties being decided over single matches, with replays if necessary. The final was played on the home ground of one of the competitors. From 1955–56 to 1958–59, there were four rounds including the final with an extra round in 1959–60 to accommodate the additional entrants.

== Participants ==
=== 1955–56 ===
Ten clubs competed:

Aldershot, Brentford, Crystal Palace, Millwall, Orient, Portsmouth, Queens Park Rangers, Reading, Watford, West Ham United

=== 1956–57 ===
Thirteen clubs competed:

Aldershot, Arsenal, Brentford, Chelsea, Charlton Athletic, Crystal Palace, Luton Town, Millwall, Orient, Queens Park Rangers, Reading, Watford, West Ham United

=== 1957–58 ===
Sixteen clubs competed:

Aldershot, Arsenal, Brentford, Chelsea, Charlton Athletic, Crystal Palace, Fulham, Luton Town, Millwall, Orient, Portsmouth, Queens Park Rangers, Reading, Southampton, Watford, West Ham United

=== 1958–59 ===
Sixteen clubs competed:

Aldershot, Arsenal, Brentford, Charlton Athletic, Coventry City, Crystal Palace, Fulham, Luton Town, Millwall, Orient, Portsmouth, Queens Park Rangers, Reading, Southampton, Watford, West Ham United

=== 1959–60 ===
Eighteen clubs competed:

Aldershot, Arsenal, Brentford, Charlton Athletic, Coventry City, Crystal Palace, Fulham, Leicester City, Luton Town, Millwall, Orient, Portsmouth, Queens Park Rangers, Reading, Southampton, Southend United, Watford, West Ham United

== List of finals ==
Season	Winners	Runners-up	Result	Final
1955–56	West Ham United	Aldershot	2–1	Upton Park
1956–57	Luton Town	Reading	2–1	Elm Park
1957–58	Portsmouth	Reading	2–0	
1958–59	Arsenal	Crystal Palace	2–0	
1959–60	Coventry City	West Ham United	2–1	
