= John Kirkham (footballer, born 1918) =

English footballer

Personal information
- Full name: John Kirkham
- Date of birth: 16 June 1918
- Place of birth: Ellesmere Port, England
- Date of death: 1982 (aged 63–64)
- Place of death: Staffordshire, England
- Position: Centre forward

Senior career*
Years	Team	Apps	(Gls)
- Ellesmere Port Town
1936–1938	Wolverhampton Wanderers	13	(5)
1938–1947	Bournemouth & Boscombe Athletic	48	(27)
- Wellington Town
Total		61	(32)
- * Club domestic league appearances and goals

John Kirkham (16 June 1918 – 1982) was an English professional footballer who played as a centre forward for Ellesmere Port Town, Wolverhampton Wanderers, Bournemouth & Boscombe Athletic and Wellington Town.
