= Ernie Adams (footballer, born 1922) =

English footballer (1922–2009)

Personal information
- Full name: Ernest William Adams
- Date of birth: 3 April 1922
- Place of birth: Willesden, England
- Date of death: 28 September 2009 (aged 87)
- Place of death: Hertford, Hertfordshire, England
- Position: Forward

Senior career*
Years	Team	Apps	(Gls)
1945–1947	Preston North End	0	(0)
1947	Fulham	0	(0)
1947–1952	Queens Park Rangers	5	(0)
1952–1955	Betteshanger CW		
1955–1956	Ashford Town	27	(3)
1956–1957	Dover		
1957–1958	Margate		
1958–	Clacton Town		
- * Club domestic league appearances and goals

Ernest William Adams (3 April 1922 – 28 September 2009) was an English professional footballer who played in the Football League for Queens Park Rangers as a forward.

Prior to joining Queens Park Rangers (for whom he played in five matches) he had been on the books of two other English Football League clubs, Preston North End and Fulham. After leaving QPR in 1952 he spent six seasons with four clubs in the Kent League: three seasons with Betteshanger Colliery Works and one each with Ashford Town, Dover and Margate. On leaving the latter he signed with Clacton Town.

In April 1953 a selection of ex-top class players chosen by and including him and playing as 'Adams' XI' beat a QPR XI in a benefit match on his behalf.
