= Les Blizzard =

English footballer

Personal information
- Full name: Leslie William Benjamin Blizzard
- Date of birth: 13 March 1923
- Place of birth: Acton, London, England
- Date of death: December 1996 (aged 73)
- Place of death: Northampton, England
- Position: Wing half

Youth career
- Mosborough Trinity

Senior career*
Years	Team	Apps	(Gls)
1946–1947	Queens Park Rangers	5	(0)
1947–1948	Bournemouth & Boscombe Athletic	1	(0)
1948–1950	Yeovil Town		
1950–1957	Leyton Orient	222	(12)
- Headington United
- Canterbury City
- Whitstable Town
- * Club domestic league appearances and goals

Leslie William Benjamin Blizzard (13 March 1923 – December 1996) was an English footballer with Queens Park Rangers, Bournemouth & Boscombe Athletic, Yeovil Town and Leyton Orient.

== Career ==
He signed for Queens Park Rangers in 1944 and played war time football alongside Alec Stock. He made his league debut in the 1–0 win against Norwich City in March 1947. He played right half and went on to play only four league games for Rangers before transferring to Bournemouth & Boscombe Athletic in 1947. He broke his leg on debut, and joined Yeovil Town in May 1948. He featured in Yeovil's 1948–49 FA Cup run, including the 2–1 defeat of First Division side Sunderland. He later signed for Leyton Orient where he played over 220 games.

After leaving Orient, he played non-league football for Headington United, Canterbury City and Whitstable Town.
