= Don Mills (footballer) =

English footballer

Personal information
- Date of birth: 17 August 1926
- Place of birth: Maltby, England
- Date of death: 1994 (aged 67–68)
- Position: Inside forward

Youth career
- Maltby Main

Senior career*
Years	Team	Apps	(Gls)
1946–1951	Queens Park Rangers	86	(9)
1949–1950	→ Torquay United (loan)	34	(13)
1951	Cardiff City	1	(0)
1951–1952	Leeds United	34	(9)
1952–1962	Torquay United	308	(68)
Total		453	(99)
- * Club domestic league appearances and goals

Don Mills (17 August 1926 – 1994) was an English professional footballer who played as an inside forward.

== Career ==
Born in Maltby, Mills played for Maltby Main, Queens Park Rangers, Torquay United (initially on loan), Cardiff City and Leeds United.
