= Frank Neary =

English footballer

Personal information
- Full name: Harold Frank Neary
- Date of birth: 6 March 1921
- Place of birth: Aldershot, England
- Date of death: 17 November 2004 (aged 83)
- Place of death: North Cheam, England
- Position: Striker

Senior career*
Years	Team	Apps	(Gls)
1945–1947	Queens Park Rangers	9	(4)
1947	West Ham United	17	(15)
1947–1949	Leyton Orient	78	(44)
1949–1950	Queens Park Rangers	19	(5)
1950–1954	Millwall	123	(50)
1954	Gravesend		
- * Club domestic league appearances and goals

Harold Frank Neary (6 March 1921 – 17 November 2004) was an English footballer who played as a striker, mainly for Millwall, Leyton Orient and West Ham United.

== Career ==
During World War II Neary played as an amateur for West Ham United, Finchley and then Fulham, before joining the Army. While stationed in Ireland he played for Glentoran. After the war he joined Queens Park Rangers (QPR) and featured in 30 regional wartime matches, scoring 23 goals.

When regular football recommenced in 1946–47, Neary continued with QPR before moving to West Ham for £4,000 in January 1947. His time there was curtailed after reportedly hitting an opponent who had fouled him, out of sight of the referee. West Ham sold him at a £2,000 loss in November 1947 to Leyton Orient, where he became the club's record goalscorer at that time, with 25 goals during the 1948–49 season. He was noted for the power of his shooting, and once knocked out opposing goalkeeper Archie McFeat of Torquay United, who got in the way of a Neary drive.

Refusing advances from Newcastle United, Neary moved back to QPR for £7,000 in October 1949, but it was a further move in August 1950, this time to Millwall for £6,000, which led him to 50 more league goals in 123 league appearances.

Neary finished his career playing non-league football at Gravesend in May 1954. He died at St Raphael's Hospice in North Cheam on 17 November 2004, aged 83.
