= Samuel Abel =

English footballer

Personal information
- Full name: Samuel Charles Abel
- Date of birth: 30 December 1908
- Place of birth: Neston, England
- Date of death: 11 August 1959 (aged 50)
- Place of death: Willesden, England
- Height: 5 ft 11 in (1.80 m)
- Position: Forward

Senior career*
Years	Team	Apps	(Gls)
- Neston Brickworks
1929	Bury	0	(0)
1930	Accrington Stanley	26	(18)
1930–1932	Chesterfield	70	(39)
1933	Fulham	9	(1)
1934–1938	Queens Park Rangers	36	(6)
1939–1940	Tunbridge Wells Rangers	3	(0)
1945-1946	Queens Park Rangers (Guest)	7	(1)
- * Club domestic league appearances and goals

Samuel Charles Abel (30 December 1908 – 26 September 1959) was an English footballer who played in the Football League for Accrington Stanley, Chesterfield, Fulham and Queens Park Rangers, signing for QPR on 24 My 1934 after 2 seasons with Fulham. He was signed by QPR to play as a forward but later played right back. Signed for Tunbridge Wells Rangers for 1939–40 season During the war he was a Special Constable in the Harlesden area of London and played again for QPR during the war time league. After the war he became a groundsman at Wembley Stadium.
