= Mike Ferguson (footballer) =

English footballer and manager (1943–2019)

Personal information
- Full name: Michael Kevin Ferguson
- Date of birth: 9 March 1943
- Place of birth: Burnley, England
- Date of death: 27 August 2019 (aged 76)
- Position: Midfielder

Youth career
- Plymouth Argyle

Senior career*
Years	Team	Apps	(Gls)
1960–1961	Accrington Stanley	23	(1)
1962–1968	Blackburn Rovers	220	(29)
1968–1969	Aston Villa	38	(2)
1969–1972	Queens Park Rangers	68	(2)
1973–1974	Cambridge United	39	(4)
1975	Los Angeles Aztecs	21	(2)
1974–1976	Rochdale	69	(5)
1976–1977	Halifax Town	2	(0)
Total		480	(45)

Managerial career
- 1976: ÍA Akranes
- 1977–1978: Rochdale
- 1981–1982: APOEL
- 1987–1988: Evagoras Paphos
- 1991: Evagoras Paphos
- * Club domestic league appearances and goals

Michael Kevin Ferguson (9 March 1943 – 27 August 2019) was an English footballer who played as a midfielder in the Football League for Accrington Stanley, Blackburn Rovers, Aston Villa, Queens Park Rangers, Cambridge United, Rochdale and Halifax Town, and in the North American Soccer League for the Los Angeles Aztecs. He was Aston Villa's record signing

== Career ==
Ferguson was born in Burnley, Lancashire. He started with Plymouth Argyle, then as a member of the Accrington Stanley team that dropped out of the league in 1962. He scored their last goal in the league though this was officially expunged as Accrington did not complete the League season. Moves to Blackburn Rovers and Aston Villa followed before joining Queens Park Rangers in November 1969.

Ferguson made 68 appearances for QPR spanning four seasons, scoring 2 goals. He made his QPR debut in November 1969 at home to Leicester City.

Ferguson left Rangers in 1973 for Cambridge United and then Rochdale whom he unsuccessfully managed between 1977 and 1978 before moving to the United States with the Los Angeles Aztecs. He also managed ÍA Akranes from Iceland in 1976, APOEL Nicosia between 1981 and 1983 and was a part of the Kuwait national team set up along with Malcolm Allison.
