= Des Farrow =

English footballer (1926–2019)

Personal information
- Full name: Desmond Albert Farrow
- Date of birth: 11 February 1926
- Place of birth: Peterborough, England
- Date of death: 5 January 2019 (aged 92)
- Position: Defender

Senior career*
Years	Team	Apps	(Gls)
- Leicester City
1945–1952	Queens Park Rangers	118	(7)
1952–1954	Stoke City	8	(0)
1955–1957	Peterborough United	29	(1)
Total		155	(8)
- * Club domestic league appearances and goals

Desmond Albert Farrow (11 February 1926 – 5 January 2019) is an English former footballer who played in the Football League for Queens Park Rangers and Stoke City.

== Career ==
Farrow was born in Peterborough and began his career with Leicester City before joining Queens Park Rangers during World War II. He played nine matches in the FA Cup in 1945–46 and began a regular in Dave Mangnall's QPR side in the Second Division in 1948–49. Rangers were relegated in 1951–52 and Farrow joined First Division Stoke City in October 1952. However, he struggled to establish himself at the Victoria Ground and left for Peterborough United after making just nine appearances.

== Career statistics ==
Club	Season	League			FA Cup		Total	
Club	Season	Division	Apps	Goals	Apps	Goals	Apps	Goals
Queens Park Rangers	1945–46	War League	0	0	9	0	9	0
Queens Park Rangers	1946–47	Second Division	0	0	0	0	0	0
Queens Park Rangers	1947–48	Second Division	0	0	0	0	0	0
Queens Park Rangers	1948–49	Second Division	17	0	2	0	19	0
Queens Park Rangers	1949–50	Second Division	22	0	1	0	23	0
Queens Park Rangers	1950–51	Second Division	39	6	1	0	40	6
Queens Park Rangers	1951–52	Second Division	32	1	0	0	32	1
Queens Park Rangers	1952–53	Third Division South	8	0	0	0	8	0
Queens Park Rangers	Total		118	7	12	0	130	7
Stoke City	1952–53	First Division	3	0	0	0	3	0
Stoke City	1953–54	Second Division	5	0	0	0	5	0
Stoke City	Total		9	0	0	0	9	0
Career Total			126	7	12	0	138	7
