= Ian Watson (footballer, born 1944) =

English footballer

- Watson in 2026

Personal information
- Full name: Ian Lionel Watson
- Date of birth: 7 January 1944 (age 82)
- Place of birth: Hammersmith, England
- Position: Full-back

Youth career
- –1962: Chelsea

Senior career*
| Years | Team | Apps | (Gls) |
| 1962–1965 | Chelsea | 5 | (1) |
| 1965–1974 | Queens Park Rangers | 202 | (1) |
| Total | | 207 | (2) |
- * Club domestic league appearances and goals

Ian Lionel Watson (born 7 January 1944) was an English footballer with Queens Park Rangers. Watson played 202 league games for QPR scoring 1 goal.
