= Ted Reay =

English footballer

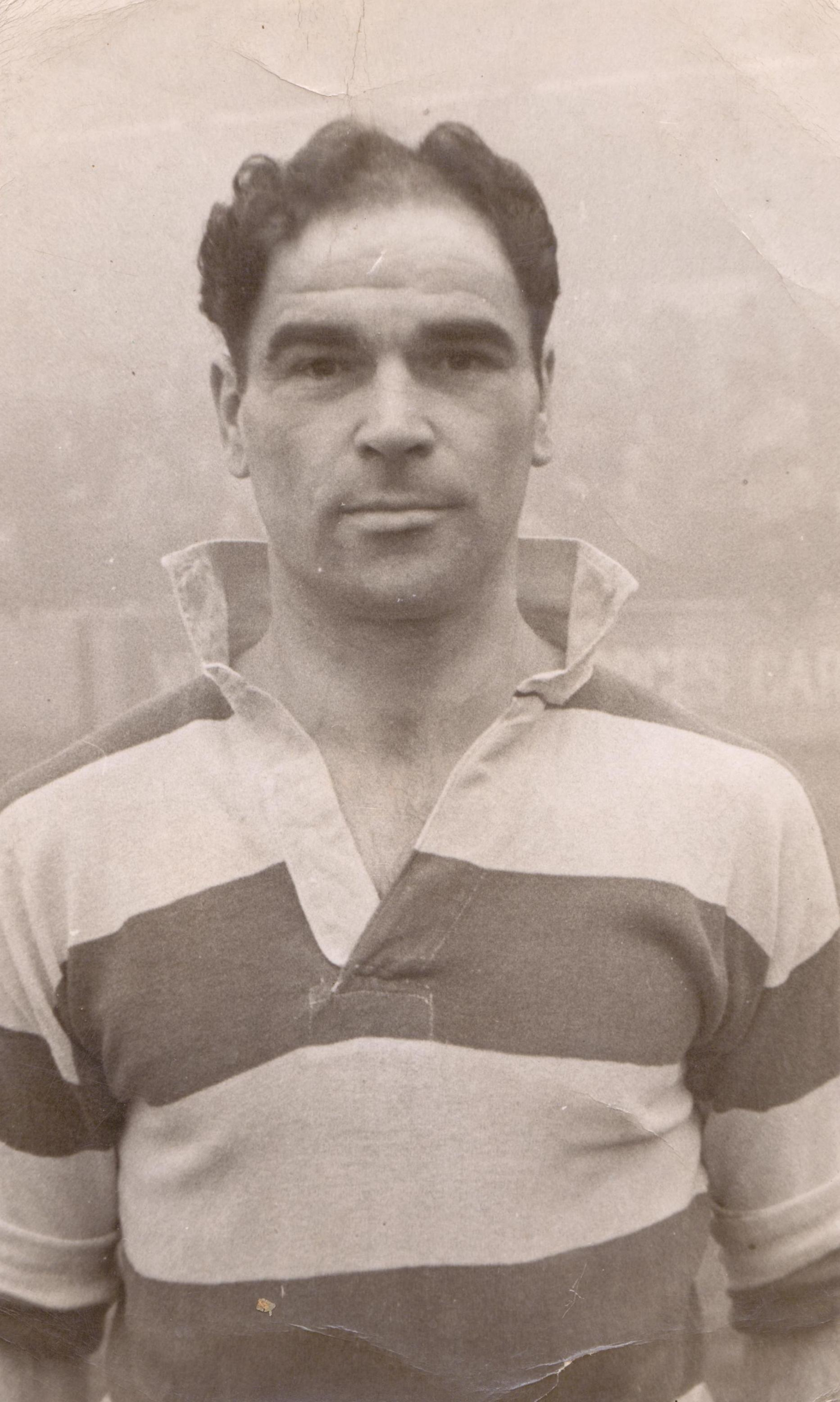

Personal information
- Full name: Edwin Peel Reay
- Date of birth: 5 August 1914
- Place of birth: Tynemouth, England
- Date of death: 4 February 1992 (aged 77)
- Place of death: Perth, Australia
- Position: Full back

Senior career*
Years	Team	Apps	(Gls)
- Washington Colliery
- Washington Chemical Works
- Ferryhill Athletic
–1937	North Shields		
1937	Sheffield United	0	(0)
1937–1949	Queens Park Rangers	34	(0)
- * Club domestic league appearances and goals

Edwin Peel Reay (5 August 1914 – 4 February 1992) was an English professional footballer who played as a full back in the Football League for Sheffield United and Queens Park Rangers. After his retirement as a player, he became assistant trainer at the club and later emigrated to Perth, Australia.

== Early life ==
Edwin 'Ted' Peel Reay was born on 5th August 1914 in East Howdon, an industrial area of Wallsend, Northumberland. He was the tenth of eleven children to shop caulker William Reay and his wife Mary Thompson Peel. His eldest brother, George Thompson Reay, was also a professional footballer.

Ted was transferred from Sheffield United to Queens Park Rangers on 12th November 1937.

Ted was recognised for his skill in playing professional football, particularly his 'two-footed' play. While playing for Queens Park Rangers in the early months of the Second World War, he would often be lent out to play for other clubs. An article in the Daily Express in May 1940 notes how Ted was called upon by Fulham FC to play a game against West Ham United. The crowd, being dissatisfied with the overall performance of the regular players, chanted 'Hip-hip Hoo-Reay' as Ted dazzled. He also played a game for Chelsea the previous month.

== Career statistics ==
Appearances and goals by club, season and competition
Club	Season	League			FA Cup		Other		Total	
Club	Season	Division	Apps	Goals	Apps	Goals	Apps	Goals	Apps	Goals
Queens Park Rangers	1937–38	Third Division South	5	0	—		0	0	5	0
Queens Park Rangers	1938–39	Third Division South	6	0	0	0	5 (Note: 3 appearances in Third Division South Cup, 2 appearances in London Challenge Cup)	0	11	0
Queens Park Rangers	1945–46	—			1	0	—		1	0
Queens Park Rangers	1946–47	Third Division South	2	0	1	0	—		3	0
Queens Park Rangers	1947–48	Second Division	16	0	0	0	—		16	0
Queens Park Rangers	1948–49	Second Division	3	0	0	0	—		3	0
Queens Park Rangers	1949–50	Second Division	2	0	0	0	—		2	0
Career total			34	0	2	0	5	0	41	0
