= Cyril Hatton =

English footballer

Personal information
- Date of birth: 14 September 1918
- Place of birth: Grantham, England
- Date of death: 4 July 1987 (aged 68)
- Place of death: Grantham, England
- Position: Inside forward

Senior career*
Years	Team	Apps	(Gls)
1936–1946	Notts County	62	(15)
1946–1953	QPR	162	(64)
1953–?	Chesterfield	36	(10)
Total		260	(89)
- * Club domestic league appearances and goals

Cyril Hatton (14 September 1918 – 4 July 1987) was a footballer with QPR.

He signed in 1946 from Notts County and made his debut in a 2–1 win against Watford in August 1946. He played inside-left and went on to play 162 league games for Rangers scoring 64 league goals. He was a key part of the 1948 team that won the Third Division (South) Championship.

Cyril transferred to Chesterfield in 1953.
