= 1919 in association football =

The following are the football (soccer) events of the year 1919 throughout the world.

== Events ==
Due to the First World War several European leagues remain suspended.

- Football League First Division expanded from 20 to 22 teams - Chelsea are saved from relegation while Arsenal are promoted despite finishing only fifth in the Second Division.
- 15 January: Espérance Sportive de Tunis is founded in the capital Tunis, Tunisia. It's the first club formed in Tunisia.
- October: Leeds City expelled from the English Football League.
- 17 October: Leeds United are founded.

== Winners club national championship ==
- Argentina: Boca Juniors, Racing Club
- Austria: Rapid Vienna
- Belgium: no national championship
- Denmark: Akademisk Boldklub
- England: no national championship
- France: no national championship
- Germany: no national championship
- Hungary: MTK Hungária FC
- Iceland: KR
- Italy: no national championship
- Luxembourg: Sporting Club Luxembourg
- Netherlands: Ajax Amsterdam
- Paraguay: Cerro Porteño
- Scotland:
  - Division One: Celtic F.C.
  - Scottish Cup: No competition
- Sweden: GAIS
- Uruguay: Nacional
- Greece: 1913 to 1921 - no championship titles due to the First World War and the Greco-Turkish War of 1919-1922.

== International tournaments ==
- 1919 Far Eastern Championship Games in China (May 12–15, 1919)

(Beiyang government) China

- South American Championship 1919 in Brazil (May 11, 1919 – May 29, 1919)

Brazil

== Births ==
- January 1 – Zyber Lisi, Albanian footballer
- January 12 – Fred Crack, English professional footballer (died 2002)
- January 18 – Toni Turek, German footballer (died 1984)
- January 23 – Bob Paisley, English footballer and manager (died 1996)
- February 12 – Ferruccio Valcareggi, Italian footballer and manager (died 2005)
- February 16 – John Finlay, English professional footballer (died 1985)
- March 2 – Frank McGinn, Scottish footballer (died 1995)
- April 5 – Tommy Hassell, English professional footballer (died 1984)
- April 21 – Gib Bellis, Welsh professional footballer (died 2000)
- May 10 – Vittorio Dagianti, Italian professional football player and coach (died 1994)
- June 5 – Stan Armitage, English footballer (died 1997)
- July 10 – Chale Silva, Colombian professional footballer (d. 2009)
- July 13 – Jack Wheeler, American professional footballer (died 2009)
- July 19 – Nordine Ben Ali, Algerian-French former association football player and manager (died 1996)
- August 27 – Arthur Aldred, English footballer (died 2002)
- August 30 – Fred Keeble, English professional footballer (died 1987)
- December 5 – Hennes Weisweiler, German footballer and manager (died 1983)
- December 25 – Fikret Kırcan, Turkish footballer (died 2014)

== Clubs founded ==
- Leeds United F.C.
- U.S. Salernitana 1919
- Piacenza Calcio 1919
- Valencia CF
- Real Murcia
- Elo Kuopio
