= 1946–47 Queens Park Rangers F.C. season =

English football club season

Queens Park Rangers
1946–47 season
- Chairman: Albert Hittinger
- Manager: Dave Mangnall
- Stadium: Loftus Road
- Football League Third Division South: 2nd
- FA Cup: Third Round
- London Challenge Cup: Quarter Finalist
- Top goalscorer: League: Fred Durrant 15; All: Johnny Pattison 17
- Highest home attendance: 24549 v Middlesbrough (11 January 1947)
- Lowest home attendance: 7,776 v Mansfield (8 February 1947)
- Biggest win: 7-0 v Swindon (21 December 1946)
Home colours	Away colours	Third colours

The 1946-47 Queens Park Rangers season was the club's 56th season of existence and their 2nd back in the English Third Division. This was the first season following the end of World War II that pre-war scheduling and league rules were reinstated. QPR finished 2nd in the league campaign, and were eliminated in the third round of the FA Cup.

== Season summary ==
Suspended because of WW2 In 1939, English football league was restarted for the 1946–47 season, Queens Park Rangers finished the season in second place in the Football League Third Division South but at that time only the season champions were promoted. In the FA Cup, 16 goals were amassed over 6 games taking First Division Middlesbrough to a replay in the third round. The London Challenge Cup also resumed with a new trophy as the holders QPR had lost the trophy during the war.

== League standings ==
Pos	Team	Pld	W	D	L	GF	GA	GAv	Pts	Promotion
1	Cardiff City (C, P)	42	30	6	6	93	30	3.100	66	Promotion to the Second Division
2	Queens Park Rangers	42	23	11	8	74	40	1.850	57	
3	Bristol City	42	20	11	11	94	56	1.679	51	
4	Swindon Town	42	19	11	12	84	73	1.151	49	
5	Walsall	42	17	12	13	74	59	1.254	46	

(C) Champions; (P) Promoted

== Results ==
QPR scores given first

Win Draw Loss

=== Third Division South ===
Date	Opponents	Venue	Result	Score F–A	Scorers	Attendance	Position
31 August 1946	Watford	Home	W	2-1	Mallett 2	19446	5
4 September 1946	AFC Bournemouth	Away	D	1-1	Neary	5738	8
7 September 1946	Walsall	Away	W	2-0	Neary 2	13894	2
11 September 1946	Leyton Orient	Home	W	2-0	Pattison, Neary	15344	1
14 September 1946	Reading	Home	W	2-0	Heath, McEwan	20021	1
21 September 1946	Crystal Palace	Away	D	0-0		27517	1
25 September 1946	AFC Bournemouth	Home	W	3-0	Neary, Durrant, Pattison	17207	1
28 September 1946	Torquay	Home	D	0-0		23117	1
5 October 1946	Mansfield	Away	W	3-0	Neary, Durrant, Pattison	13459	1
12 October 1946	Bristol Rovers	Home	L	0-2		20668	2
19 October 1946	Cardiff City	Away	D	2-2	Durrant, Hatton	44010	3
26 October 1946	Norwich City	Home	D	1-1	Hatton	15581	3
2 November 1946	Notts County	Away	W	2-1	Neary, Heathcote	26734	3
9 November 1946	Northampton	Home	W	1-0	McEwan	17796	3
16 November 1946	Aldershot	Away	W	2-1	Sheppard (og), Pattison (pen)	8163	2
23 November 1946	Brighton	Home	W	2-0	Hatton 2	17739	2
7 December 1946	Port Vale	Home	W	2-0	Harris, Mills	14251	2
14 December 1946	Bristol City	A		PP			
21 December 1946	Swindon	Home	W	7-0	Powell I., Pattison 2, Hatton, Mills, McEwan 2	9576	2
25 December 1946	Ipswich Town	Home	L	1-3	Hatton	15503	2
26 December 1946	Ipswich Town	Away	D	1-1	Hatton	20267	2
28 December 1946	Watford	Away	W	2-0	Mallett 2	18610	2
4 January 1947	Walsall	Home	W	1-0	Boxshall	16289	2
11 January 1947	Exeter City	A		PP			
18 January 1947	Reading	Away	L	0-1		19300	2
25 January 1947	Crystal Palace	Home	L	1-2	Pattison	13022	2
29 January 1947	Exeter City	A		PP			
1 February 1947	Torquay United	A		PP			
8 February 1947	Mansfield	Home	W	3-1	Boxshall, Durrant, Pattison	7776	2
15 February 1947	Bristol Rovers	Away	L	1-3	Durrant	18258	2
22 February 1947	Cardiff City	H		PP			
1 March 1947	Norwich City	Away	W	1-0	Mills	15233	2
5 March 1947	Exeter	Away	L	0-3		3679	2
8 March 1947	Notts County	Home	W	4-1	Pattison, Durrant 2, Chapman	9455	2
15 March 1947	Northampton	Away	D	4-4	Parkinson 2, Mills, Durrant	9907	2
22 March 1947	Aldershot	Home	W	4-1	Hatton 3, Durrant	12600	2
29 March 1947	Brighton	Away	W	2-0	McEwan 2	8432	2
4 April 1947	Southend	Home	W	1-0	Durrant	20307	2
5 April 1947	Exeter	Home	W	2-0	Durrant, Pattison	18267	2
7 April 1947	Southend	Away	W	3-1	Durrant, McEwan, Mills	17295	2
12 April 1947	Port Vale	Away	D	2-2	Durrant, Boxshall	12500	2
19 April 1947	Bristol City	Home	W	1-0	McEwan	19665	2
26 April 1947	Swindon	Away	L	2-3	Durrant, Hatton	20884	2
3 May 1947	Leyton Orient	Away	D	1-1	Hatton	13956	2
10 May 1947	Bristol City	Away	D	1-1	Durrant	20861	2
17 May 1947	Torquay	Away	D	0-0		7162	2
24 May 1947	Cardiff City	Home	L	2-3	Wardle (og), Pattison	23272	2

=== FA Cup ===
Date	Round	Opponents	Venue	Result F–A	Scorers	Attendance
30 November 1946	First Round	Poole Town (Western League )	Home	2-2	Pattison, Hatton	15000
4 December 1946	First Round Replay	Poole Town (Western League )	Away	6-0	Mallett 2, Hatton, Harris, Pattison 2	9000
12 December 1946	Second Round	Norwich City (Third Division South)	Away	4-4	Pattison, McEwan, Mills 2	26307
18 December 1946	Second Round Replay	Norwich City (Third Division South)	Home	2-0	Mills, Hatton	13900
11 January 1947	Third Round	Middlesbrough (First Division)	Home	1-1	Pattison	24549
15 January 1947	Third Round Replay	Middlesbrough (First Division)	Away	1-3	Boxshall	31270

=== London Challenge Cup ===
Date	Round	Opponents	Venue	Result F–A	Scorers	Attendance
21 October 1946	First Round	Fulham	A	5-0		
28 October 1946	Quarter-Finals	Tottenham Hotspur	A	0-1		

=== Friendlies ===
24 August 1946	Whites v Blues	H	Practice Match
8 May 1947	Willesden	A	Friendly
4 June 1947	Rejkjavik	A	Friendly
6 June 1947	Fram	A	Friendly
9 June 1947	K.R. F. C.	A	Friendly
11 June 1947	Rejkjavik	A	Friendly

== Squad ==
Position	Nationality	Name	League Appearances	League Goals	FA Cup Appearances	FA Cup Goals	Total Appearances	Total Goals
GK	(England)	Reg Allen	41		5		46	
GK	(England)	Reg Saphin	1		1		2	
DF	(England)	Des Farrow						
DF	(England)	Bill Heath	6	1	1		7	1
DF	(England)	Jack Rose	15		1		16	
DF	(England)	George Powell						
DF	(England)	Arthur Jefferson	40		6		46	
DF	(England)	Reg Dudley	26		4		30	
DF	(England)	Ted Reay	2		1		3	
DF	(Scotland)	Johnny Barr	4				4	
MF	(England)	Alf Parkinson	10	2			10	2
MF	(England)	Alf Ridyard	7		3		10	
MF	(England)	George Smith						
MF	(England)	Harry Daniels	7		1		8	
MF	(Wales)	Ivor Powell	41	1	6		47	1
MF	(England)	Albert Smith	33		5		38	
MF	(Scotland)	Alex Lennon						
MF	(England)	Reg Chapman	27	1	3		30	1
MF	(England)	Joe Mallett	26	4	5	2	31	6
MF	(England)	Les Blizzard	5				5	
FW	(England)	Bert Addinall	3		1		4	
FW	(England)	Cyril Hatton	26	12	6	3	32	15
FW	(England)	Don Mills	18	5	2	3	20	8
FW	(Scotland)	Billy McEwan	35	8	6	1	41	9
FW	(Scotland)	Johnny Pattison	37	11	6	5	43	16
FW	(England)	Johnny Hartburn						
FW	(England)	Fred Durrant	22	15			22	15
FW	(England)	Danny Boxshall	12	3	2	1	14	4
FW	(England)	Frank Neary	9	7			9	7
FW	(England)	William Heathcote	5	1			5	1
FW	(England)	Stan Armitage	2				2	
FW	(England)	Reg Swinfen	1				1	
FW	(Scotland)	Neil Harris	1	1	1	1	2	2

== Transfers in ==
Name	From	Date	Fee
Don Mills	Maltby Main	17 August 1946	
Reg Saphin	Ipswich	August 1946	
Fred Durrant	Brentford	September 1946	£4,500
Neil Harris	Swansea Town	September 1946	
Les Borthwick	Jarrow	October 1946	
George Powell	Fulham	November 1946	
Reg Dudley	Millwall	December 1946	Wilf Heathcote
Alec Lennon	Denaby United	March 1947	
Johnny Hartburn	Yeovil Town	17 March 1947	£1,000
George Smith	Brentford	June 1947	£2,000

== Transfers out ==
Name	From	Date	Fee	Date	Club	Fee
Eric Hardy *		11 May 1945		cs 46	Hendon	
Ron Webb		15 October 1940		September 1946	Crystal P	
Wilf Heathcote	Millwall	February 1943		November 1946	Millwall	Reg Dudley
Frank Neary	Finchley	14 June 1945		January 1947	West Ham	£4,000
Joe Mallett	Charlton	8 February 1939	£800	February 1947	Southampton	£5,000
Neil Harris	Southampton	September 1946		May 1947	Retired (Inj. - QPR asst. man.)	
Les Blizzard	Eversheds	July 1941		May 1947	Bournemouth	
Reg Swinfen	Civil Service	March 1936		June 1947	Yeovil Town	£500
