= Griffiths =

Origin
- Meaning: "Son of Griffith"
- Region of origin: Wales

Other names
- Variant forms: Gruffydd, Griffith, Griffis, Griffits, Griffitts, Griffin

Griffiths is a surname with Welsh origins, as in Gruffydd ap Llywelyn Fawr. People named Griffiths include:

- Alan Griffiths (born 1952), Australian politician and businessman
- Alan Griffiths (cricketer) (1957–2023), English cricketer
- Albert Griffiths (1908–1970), British trade unionist
- Andrew Griffiths (disambiguation), several people
- Ann Griffiths (1776–1805), Welsh poet and hymn writer
- Anne Griffiths (1932–2017), personal archivist of the Duke of Edinburgh
- Antony Griffiths (born 1951), British museum curator and art historian
- Barri Griffiths (born 1982), Welsh professional wrestler and former Gladiators competitor
- Barry Griffiths (Australian footballer) (born 1929), Australian rules footballer
- Barry Griffiths (footballer, born 1940), association football goalkeeper
- Bede Griffiths (1906–1993), British-born monk and missionary in India
- Brian Griffiths, Baron Griffiths of Fforestfach (born 1941), British economist
- Bryn Griffiths (born 1982), Welsh rugby union player
- Bryn Griffiths (writer) (1933–2025), Welsh poet and writer
- Cecil Griffiths (1901–1945), Welsh sprinter and middle-distance runner
- Charles Griffiths (politician) (1903–1982), Australian politician
- Colin Griffiths (born 1983), English comedian, DJ, VJ and writer
- Ciarán Griffiths (born 1983), British actor, currently in Shameless
- Dan Griffiths (rugby union, born 1857) (1857–1936), Welsh rugby union forward
- Dan Griffiths (rugby union, born 1979), Welsh rugby union fly-half
- David Griffiths (disambiguation), several people
- Dean Griffiths (born 1980), Jamaican hurdler
- Derek Griffiths (born 1946), British actor
- Dewi Griffiths (born 1931), Welsh television producer and radio host
- Eddie Griffiths, Australian fire fighter, World War I veteran and rugby league footballer
- Eliezer Griffiths (1827–1920), Welsh Congregationalist minister in Australia
- Elly Griffiths (born 1963), British author
- Estyn Griffths (1927–2017), Welsh footballer
- Frances Griffiths (1907–1986), one of two girls who faked the Cottingley Fairies photographs
- Franny Griffiths, English musician, member of the band Space
- Fred Griffiths (rugby league), South African rugby league footballer
- Fred Griffiths (actor) (1912–1994), British actor
- Gwenny Griffiths (1867–1953), Welsh painter
- Herbert Griffiths (1899–1969), British cinema organist and theatre composer
- Howard Griffiths (disambiguation), several people
- Hugh Griffiths, Baron Griffiths (1923–2015), British judge, cricketer and life peer
- H. W. Griffiths (Henry W. Griffiths Jr.), Idaho railroad photographer
- Ivor Griffiths (1918–1993), Welsh footballer
- Jemma Griffiths (1975–), better known as Jem, Welsh singer-songwriter
- Jennie Scott Griffiths (1875–1951) American, Fijian, and Australian journalist and women's rights activist
- Joel Griffiths (1979–), Australian soccer
- John Griffiths (disambiguation), several people
- Ken Griffiths (footballer) (1930–2008), English footballer
- Ken Griffiths (photographer) (1945–2014), New Zealand born photographer
- Leigh Griffiths (born 1990), Scottish footballer
- Leslie Griffiths (born 1942), British Methodist minister, politician and life peer
- Linda Griffiths (1953–2014), Canadian actor and playwright
- Llewelyn Griffiths (1877–1943), Welsh footballer
- Louise Griffiths (born 1978), English pop singer, songwriter and actress
- Lucy Griffiths (actress, born 1919), English actress
- Lucy Griffiths (actress, born 1986), English actress
- Marcia Griffiths (born 1949) Jamaican singer
- M. A. Griffiths (1947–2009), British poet
- Maurice Griffiths (1902–1997), English yachtsman, boat designer and writer on sailing subjects
- Mike Griffiths (born 1962), Welsh international rugby player
- Mike Griffiths (British Army officer) a retired British police officer who served as Chief Constable and Chief Executive of the Civil Nuclear Constabulary, and before as a Brigadier
- Niall Griffiths (born 1966), English author
- Peter Griffiths (1928–2013), English politician
- Philip Jones Griffiths (1936–2008), Welsh photojournalist
- Philip Lewis Griffiths (1881–1945), Australian jurist
- Phillip Griffiths (born 1938), American mathematician
- Rachel Griffiths (born 1968), Australian actress
- Ralph Griffiths (c. 1720–1803), English editor and publisher
- Rhys Griffiths (footballer) (born 1980), Welsh footballer and manager
- Rhys Griffiths (rugby league) (born 1987), English former footballer
- Richard Griffiths (1947–2013), British actor
- Richard Griffiths (disambiguation), several people
- Robert Griffiths (disambiguation), several people
- Roland Griffiths (1946–2023), American psychopharmacologist
- Roland Griffiths-Marsh (1923–2012), Australian soldier and author
- Rowland Griffiths (1886–1914), Wales international rugby union player
- Ryan Griffiths (guitarist) (born 1978), Australian musician, member of the garage rock band The Vines
- Sandi Griffiths (born 1946), American singer
- Sarah Griffiths (born 2001), English singer and songwriter known professionally as Griff
- Selina Griffiths (born 1969), British actress
- Shelley Griffiths, New Zealand law academic
- Stan Griffiths (1911–2003), Welsh footballer
- Steve, Steven or Stephen Griffiths (disambiguation), several people
- Terry Griffiths (1947–2024), Welsh snooker player
- Terry Griffiths (politician) (1944–2009), New South Wales politician
- Thomas Griffiths (disambiguation), several people named Thomas, Tom, or Tommy Griffiths
- Trevor Griffiths (1935–2024), English dramatist
- Tuffy Griffiths (1907–1968), American boxer
- Walter Griffiths (footballer), English footballer
- William Griffiths (disambiguation), several people
- Wyn Griffiths (1919–2006), Welsh footballer

== See also ==
- Griffin (disambiguation)
- Griffith (disambiguation)
- Griffith (name)
- Griffith (surname)
- Griffiths Island, Port Fairy, Victoria, Australia
- Griffiths v Northern Territory, a series of landmark cases regarding native title in Australia
- Käthe Bosse-Griffiths (1910–1998), German-born Egyptologist and writer in the Welsh language
- Introduction to Quantum Mechanics, a physics textbook by David J. Griffiths often called "Griffiths" for short
