= 1940–41 Queens Park Rangers F.C. season =

English football club season

Queens Park Rangers
1940–41 season
- Chairman: Charles W Fielding
- Manager: Ted Vizard
- Stadium: Loftus Road
- South Regional Championship: 26th
- Football League War Cup: Round 4
- London War Cup: 3rd place
- Top goalscorer: League: All: Dave Mangnall 31
- Highest home attendance: 5,700 v Leicester City (29 March 1941)
- Lowest home attendance: 500 v Reading (21 December 1940)
- Average home league attendance: 2,368
| Home colours | Away colours |

The 1940–41 Queens Park Rangers season was the club's 50th season of existence and their first in the South Regional Championship, part of the Wartime League. QPR finished 20th in the league, were eliminated in the fourth round of the Football League War Cup, and third in the London War Cup.

== Season summary ==
QPR were included in the rather expansive League South that had no less than 34 teams all playing varying numbers of games. There was no structure and, at best, these games were all ostensibly friendlies. There were two Cup competitions, the London War Cup and the League War Cup. The London War Cup consisted of six teams with QPR finishing 3rd and the League War Cup was basically just a home and away set against four other opponents. There is no table for the League War Cup though QPR finished the eight matches with six wins and two losses.

== League standings ==
=== NB: ranking according to goal average ===
| Pos | Team | Pld | W | D | L | GF | GA | GR |
|---|---|---|---|---|---|---|---|---|
| 25 | Stoke City | 36 | 9 | 8 | 18 | 76 | 96 | 0.792 |
| 26 | Queens Park Rangers | 23 | 8 | 3 | 12 | 47 | 60 | 0.783 |
| 27 | Brighton & Hove Albion | 25 | 8 | 7 | 10 | 51 | 75 | 0.680 |

=== Results ===
League South

Win Draw Loss

=== League South ===
| Date | Opponents | Venue | Result | Score F–A | Scorers | Attendance | Position |
|---|---|---|---|---|---|---|---|
| 31 August 1940 | Fulham | A | L | 1–3 | Swinfen | 3000 | 27 |
| 7 September 1940 | Clapton Orient | H | D | 3–3 | Bott 2, Ridyard | 1000 | 23 |
| 21 September 1940 | Charlton Athletic | H | W | 2–0 | Bott, Swinfen | 2000 | 18 |
| 28 September 1940 | Arsenal | H | W | 3–2 | Swinfen 2, Lowe | 2500 | 13 |
| 5 October 1940 | Tottenham Hotspur | H | D | 1–1 | Lowe | 1500 | 10 |
| 12 October 1940 | Chelsea | H | L | 2–3 | Daniels, Bott | 1500 | 13 |
| 19 October 1940 | Chelsea | A | L | 1–3 | Swinfen | 1500 | 20 |
| 26 October 1940 | Charlton Athletic | A | L | 2–6 | Mangnell, OG | 500 | 26 |
| 2 November 1940 | Clapton Orient | A | W | 3–0 | McCarthy 2, Mangnell | 200 | 22 |
| 16 November 1940 | Fulham | H | L | 2–5 | Mangnell, Daniels | 1000 | 22 |
| 23 November 1940 | Millwall | A | L | 1–3 | Lowe | 500 | 26 |
| 30 November 1940 | Millwall | H | W | 2–1 | Mangnell, Lowe | 400 | 22 |
| 7 December 1940 | Tottenham Hotspur | A | W | 3–2 | Mangnell 2, Mallett | 1367 | 22 |
| 14 December 1940 | Arsenal | A | L | 2–3 | Bott, Ridyard | 1300 | 24 |
| 21 December 1940 | Reading | H | W | 4–1 | Mangnell 2, Lowe, Mallett | 500 | 22 |
| 25 December 1940 | Brentford | A | L | 1–2 | Mangnell | 1200 | 23 |
| 28 December 1940 | Reading | A | L | 0–2 | | 2000 | 23 |
| 29 March 1941 | Crystal Palace | H | | pp | | | |
| 11 April 1941 | Watford | H | | pp | | | |
| 14 April 1941 | Watford | A | | pp | | | |
| 10 May 1941 | Aldershot | A | L | 1–5 | Ling | 2000 | 26 |
| 17 May 1941 | Watford | H | W | 4–2 | Ling 2, Mangnell 2 | 1500 | 26 |
| 24 May 1941 | Watford | A | D | 3–3 | Ling, Davie, Mangnell | 2000 | 25 |
| 31 May 1941 | West Ham United | H | L | 1–5 | Mangnall | 2000 | 26 |
| 2 June 1941 | Fulham | H | L | 2–3 | Bonass, Halford | 2500 | 26 |
| 7 June 1941 | West Ham United | A | W | 3–2 | Compton 2, Mills | 2100 | 26 |

=== Football League War Cup ===
| Date | Opponents | Venue | Result | Score F–A | Scorers | Attendance |
|---|---|---|---|---|---|---|
| 15 February 1941 | Crystal Palace | A | W | 1–0 | Joe Mallett | 3700 |
| 22 February 1941 | Crystal Palace | H | W | 3–2 | OG, Dave Mangnall, Reg Swinfen | 3500 |
| 1 March 1941 | Aldershot | A | L | 1–2 | Dave Mangnall (Pen) | 2500 |
| 8 March 1941 | Aldershot | H | W | 4–2 | Dave Mangnall, Adam, Lowe | 2733 |
| 15 March 1941 | Chelsea | H | W | 2–0 | Dave Mangnall 2 | 5575 |
| 22 March 1941 | Chelsea | A | W | 4–2 | Joe Mallett Dave Mangnall 2 (1 pen), Webb | 7232 |
| 29 March 1941 | Leicester City | H | W | 2–1 | Dave Mangnall 2 | 5700 |
| 5 April 1941 | Leicester City | A | L | 1–6 | Joe Mallett | 10000 |

=== London War Cup ===
| Date | Opponents | Venue | Result | Score F–A | Scorers | Attendance |
|---|---|---|---|---|---|---|
| 4 January 1941 | Fulham | A | L | 1–4 | Mangnall | 1000 |
| 11 January 1941 | Fulham | H | L | 5–7 | Lowe, Moffat, Bonass, Bott, Mangnall | 2256 |
| 18 January 1941 | Aldershot | A | | PP | | |
| 25 January 1941 | Aldershot | H | L | 2–3 | Mallett 2 | 1000 |
| 1 February 1941 | Chelsea | H | W | 5–2 | Lowe, McEwan 2, Bott, Mangnall | 1900 |
| 8 February 1941 | Aldershot | A | W | 4–2 | Mangnall, Daniels, Adam, Mallett | 2000 |
| 1 March 1941 | Crystal Palace | A | | PP | | |
| 15 March 1941 | Brentford | A | | pp | | |
| 22 March 1941 | Brentford | H | | pp | | |
| 5 April 1941 | Chelsea | A | | pp | | |
| 12 April 1941 | Crystal Palace | A | W | 2–1 | Mangnall, Fitzgerald | 5000 |
| 14 April 1941 | Brentford | A | L | 2–4 | Mangnall, Daniels | |
| 19 April 1941 | Crystal Palace | H | W | 2–1 | Davie (2) | 2300 |
| 25 April 1941 | Brentford | H | D | 0–0 | | 6000 |
| 3 May 1941 | Chelsea | A | W | 3–2 | Mangnall 2, Davie | 4000 |

=== Friendlies ===
| 24 August 1940 | Possibles v Probables (H) | H | |
| 14 September 1940 | Norwich City | a | Cancelled |

== Squad ==
| Position | Nationality | Name | League South Appearances *16 games data missing | League South Goals | London War Cup Apps | London War Cup Goals | !Football League War Cup Apps*4 games data missing | Football League War Cup Goals | Total Appearances | Total Goals |
|---|---|---|---|---|---|---|---|---|---|---|
| GK | (England) | Reg Allen | | | 1 | | | | 1 | |
| GK | (England) | Bill Mason | 7 | | 9 | | 3 | | 38 | |
| DF | (England) | Arthur Jefferson | 2 | | 3 | | 3 | | 16 | |
| DF | (England) | Ted Reay | 1 | | | | 3 | | 4 | |
| DF | (England) | Sid Bacon | 1 | | | | | | 2 | |
| DF | (England) | John Dumsday | 1 | | | | | | 1 | |
| DF | (England) | Leslie Lievesley | | | | | | | 1 | |
| DF | (England) | Johnny Mortimer | | | 1 | | | | 1 | |
| DF | (England) | Laurence Scott | | | | | | | 1 | |
| DF | (England) | Leslie Compton | 1 | 2 | | | | | 1 | 2 |
| DF | (Scotland) | Robert Griffiths | | | | | | | 1 | |
| DF | | E Edwards | | | 2 | | | | 5 | |
| MF | | John Hillard | | | | | | | 1 | |
| MF | (England) | Wilf Whitfield | 2 | | | | | | 4 | |
| MF | (England) | Alf Ridyard | 4 | 2 | 10 | | 3 | | 37 | 2 |
| MF | (England) | Harry Daniels | 3 | 2 | 1 | 2 | 1 | | 11 | 4 |
| MF | (Wales) | Ivor Powell | | | | | | | 1 | |
| MF | (England) | Joe Mallett | 1 | 2 | 1 | 4 | 2 | 3 | 15 | 9 |
| MF | (Scotland) | Alec Farmer | 3 | | 8 | | 2 | | 28 | |
| MF | (England) | Dicky March | 7 | | 10 | | 4 | | 33 | |
| MF | (England) | Alf Fitzgerald | 1 | | 3 | 1 | | | 4 | 1 |
| MF | (England) | Richard Armstrong | 1 | | 1 | | | | 2 | |
| MF | (Scotland) | Charlie Adam | 1 | | 3 | 1 | 3 | 1 | 9 | 2 |
| MF | | Campbell | 1 | | | | | | 1 | |
| MF | | J. Webb | | | 8 | | 1 | 1 | 20 | 1 |
| MF | (England) | Alan Fowler | 2 | | | | | | 2 | |
| MF | (England) | Jack Mahon | | | | | | | 1 | |
| FW | (Scotland) | Billy McEwan | | | 1 | 2 | ` | | 6 | 2 |
| FW | (Scotland) | Johnny Pattison | 1 | | 1 | | | | 2 | |
| FW | (England) | Reg Swinfen | 3 | 5 | 5 | | 2 | 1 | 23 | 6 |
| FW | (England) | Dave Mangnall | 5 | 13 | 8 | 8 | 4 | 10 | 32 | 31 |
| FW | (England) | Albert Bonass | 5 | 1 | 3 | 1 | | | 19 | 2 |
| FW | (England) | Len McCarthy | 2 | 2 | | | | | 11 | 2 |
| FW | (England) | Samuel Abel | 7 | | 7 | | 3 | | 37 | |
| FW | (Scotland) | Harry Lowe | 7 | 5 | 10 | 2 | 4 | 1 | 39 | 8 |
| FW | (England) | Wilf Bott | 3 | 5 | 4 | 2 | | | 20 | 7 |
| FW | (Scotland) | Jock Davie | 3 | 1 | 3 | 3 | | | 7 | 4 |
| FW | (England) | David Halford | 2 | 1 | 3 | | | | 6 | 1 |
| FW | (Scotland) | James Jackson | | | | | | | 1 | |
| FW | | L Ling | 1 | 4 | | | | | 5 | 4 |
| FW | (England) | George Mills | 1 | 1 | | | | | 1 | 1 |
| | | J Smith | | | | | | | 1 | |
| | | K Wilson | | | | | | | 1 | |

== Transfers in ==
| Name | from | Date | Fee |
|---|---|---|---|
| Chapman, Reg * | R.A.F. | 27 August 1940 | |
| Bacon, Stan * | | 7 October 1940 | |
| Webb, Ron * | | 15 October 1940 | |
| Ling, Leonard * | | 15 October 1940 | |
| Webb, Jack * | | 15 October 1940 | |
| Edwards, Ernest * | | 24 October 1940 | |
| Libby, Jack * | | 13 December 1940 | |
| Armstrong, Dick | Bristol C | Apr 1941 | Loan |

== Transfers out ==
[edit]

| Name | from | Date | Fee | Date | Club | Fee |
|---|---|---|---|---|---|---|
| Fitzgerald, Alf | Reading | 5 May 1936 | Free | Sep 40 | Hearts | |
