= 1939–40 Queens Park Rangers F.C. season =

English football club season

Queens Park Rangers
1939–40 season
- Chairman: Charles W Fielding
- Manager: Ted Vizard
- Stadium: Loftus Road
- Football League Third Division South: 16th (abandoned)
- League South 'B': Winners
- League South 'D': 2nd
- London War Cup: First Round
- Top goalscorer: League: Dave Mangnall 3 All: Dave Mangnall 40
- Highest home attendance: 11,002 v. Watford (26 Aug 1939)
- Lowest home attendance: 1,000 v. Reading (23 May 1940); AFC Bournemouth (1 June 1940)
- Average home league attendance: 4,535
- Biggest win: 7-0 v. Brentford (30 Dec 1939)
- Biggest defeat: 2-5 v. Crystal Palace (24 Feb 1940)
Home colours	Away colours

The 1939-40 Queens Park Rangers season was the club's 49th season of existence and their 20th season in the Football League Third Division. QPR were 16th in the league before the season was abandoned after matchday 3 following the outbreak of World War II.

== Season summary ==
The 1939-40 Third Division season kicked-off on Saturday 26 August 1939, but on 1 September 1939, Germany invaded Poland, sparking the outbreak of World War II. Following Britain's declaration of war on 3 September 1939, the league was abandoned and results expunged from the records. For this reason, appearances and goals scored in the three matches that were played do not contribute to a player's overall appearances and goals record.

The League season resumed in October 1939 with QPR placed in South B League of the Wartime League. This new division was founded with three teams, QPR, Bournemouth & Boscombe Athletic, and Chelsea. QPR won the first section of the league, which played 18 matches. The section section of the league, in which QPR was assigned to the South D League, saw the team finish second across a further 18 matches.

== League standings ==
Pos	Team	Pld	W	D	L	GF	GA	GAv	Pts
14	Walsall	3	1	1	1	3	3	1.000	3
15	Ipswich Town	3	0	3	0	3	3	1.000	3
16	Queens Park Rangers	3	0	2	1	4	5	0.800	2
16	Watford	3	0	2	1	4	5	0.800	2
18	Northampton Town	3	1	0	2	2	12	0.167	2

=== South B League ===
Pos	Team	Pld	W	D	L	GF	GA	GR	Pts
1	Queens Park Rangers	18	12	2	4	49	26	1.885	26
2	Bournemouth & Boscombe Athletic	18	11	2	5	52	37	1.405	24
3	Chelsea	18	9	5	4	44	37	1.189	23

=== South D League ===
Pos	Team	Pld	W	D	L	GF	GA	GR	Pts
1	Crystal Palace	18	13	1	4	64	30	2.133	27
2	Queens Park Rangers	18	10	3	5	38	28	1.357	23
3	Watford	18	7	7	4	41	29	1.414	21

== Results ==
QPR scores given first

Win Draw Loss

=== Football League Jubilee ===
Date	Opponents	Venue	Result	Score	Scorers	Attendance
19 August 1939	Northampton Town	Home	W	3-2	Fitzgerald 2, Bonass,	5000

=== Third Division South ===
Date	Opponents	Venue	Result	Score F–A	Scorers	Attendance	Position
26 August 1939	Watford	Home	D	2-2	Mangnall 2	8000	14
30 August 1939	AFC Bournemouth	Away	D	2-2	Mangnall, Swinfen	4000	9
2 September 1939	Walsall	Away	L	0-1		5000	16
4 September 1939	Clapton Orient	h		Cancelled			
9 September 1939	Reading	h		Cancelled			
16 September 1939	Crystal Palace	A		Cancelled			
23 September 1939	Torquay United	h		Cancelled			
30 September 1939	Mansfield Town	a		Cancelled			
7 October 1939	Bristol Rovers	h		Cancelled			
14 October 1939	Cardiff City	a		Cancelled			
21 October 1939	Norwich City	h		Cancelled			
28 October 1939	Notts County	A		Cancelled			
4 November 1939	Northampton Town	h		Cancelled			
11 November 1939	Aldershot Town	A		Cancelled			
18 November 1939	Brighton and Hove Albion	h		Cancelled			
2 December 1939	Port Vale	h		Cancelled			
9 December 1939	Bristol City	A		Cancelled			
16 December 1939	Swindon Town	h		Cancelled			
23 December 1939	Watfford	A		Cancelled			
25 December 1939	Ipswich Town	h		Cancelled			
26 December 1939	Ipswich Town	A		Cancelled			
30 December 1939	Walsall	h		Cancelled			
7 January 1940	Reading	A		Cancelled			
13 January 1940	Exeter City	a		Cancelled			
20 January 1940	Crystal Palace	h		Cancelled			
27 January 1940	Torquay United	A		Cancelled			
3 February 1940	Mansfield Town	h		Cancelled			
10 February 1940	Bristol Rovers	A		Cancelled			
17 February 1940	Cardiff City	h		Cancelled			
24 February 1940	Norwich City	a		Cancelled			
2 March 1940	Notts County	h		Cancelled			
9 March 1940	Northampton Town	a		Cancelled			
16 March 1940	Aldershot Town	h		Cancelled			
22 March 1940	Southend United	h		Cancelled			
23 March 1940	Brighton & Hove Albion	a		Cancelled			
25 March 1940	Southend United	A		Cancelled			
30 March 1940	Exeter City	h		Cancelled			
6 April 1940	Port Vale	a		Cancelled			
13 April 1940	Bristol City	h		Cancelled			
20 April 1940	Swindon Town	A		Cancelled			
27 April 1940	Clapton Orient	a		Cancelled			
4 May 1940	Bournemouth & Boscombe	h		Cancelled			

=== South B League ===
Date	Opponents	Venue	Result	Score F–A	Scorers	Attendance	Position
21 October 1939	Reading	Away	L	0-2		5000	9
28 October 1939	Fulham	Home	D	2-2	Mangnall, McCarthy	5000	7
4 November 1939	Portsmouth	Away	L	1-2	Mangnall	3000	8
11 November 1939	Brentford	Home	W	1-0	McCarthy	8000	8
18 November 1939	Aldershot	Home	W	4-1	Mangnall 2, Mallett, McEwan	5200	5
25 November 1939	AFC Bournemouth	Away	L	0-3		4000	6
2 December 1939	Chelsea	Home	W	3-2	Mallett, Mangnall 2	8010	7
9 December 1939	Southampton	Away	W	2-1	March, McEwan	1500	6
16 December 1939	Brighton	Home	W	3-2	Mangnall, March, McEwan	2000	5
23 December 1939	Reading	h		PP			
25 December 1939	Fulham	Away	W	8-3	Mangnall 3, Mallett 3, Bonass, McCarthy	6006	
26 December 1939	Portsmouth	Home	W	5-2	Mangnall 4, Mallett	5188	4
30 December 1939	Brentford	Away	W	7-0	Mallett, Gorman (og), McCarthy, McEwan, Mangnall, Bonass 2	4000	2
1 January 1940	Reading	Home	W	3-0	Mallett, Mangnall 2	1500	1
6 January 1940	Aldershot	Away	W	3-1	Mangnall 2, McEwan	2000	1
13 January 1940	AFC Bournemouth	Home	W	2-1	Mangnall, McEwan	8136	1
20 January 1940	Chelsea	Away	D	0-0		8819	1
8 February 1940	Southampton	Home	W	4-1	Bonass, McEwan 3	2000	1
10 February 1940	Southend	Home	W	3-1	March, Bonass, McEwan	3908	1
1 January 1940	Reading	h	League South Group B				
27 January 1940	Southampton	h	League South Group B				
3 February 1940	Brighton & Hove Albion	a	League South Group B				

=== South D League ===
Date	Opponents	Venue	Result	Score F–A	Scorers	Attendance	Position
24 February 1940	Crystal Palace	Home	L	2-5	McCarthy 2	6500	3
2 March 1940	Reading	Away	L	1-4	Mangnall	1873	8
9 March 1940	Brighton	Away	W	2-1	McEwan, Mallett	1500	9
16 March 1940	Norwich City	Home	D	0-0		4205	6
22 March 1940	Watford	Away	D	1-1	Mangnall	7537	
23 March 1940	Aldershot	Home	W	3-1	Mangnall 2, McEwan	5196	
25 March 1940	Watford	Home	W	2-0	McCarthy, McEwan	6258	
30 March 1940	Clapton Orient	Away	L	3-4	McEwan, Mangnall 2	3000	3
3 April 1940	AFC Bournemouth	Away	L	0-1			5
6 April 1940	Southend	Away	W	1-0	McEwan	2500	
10 April 1940	Aldershot	Away	W	1-0	Mangnall	2000	5
20 April 1940	Brighton	Home	W	5-4	Mangnall 3, Mallett, McEwan	3000	
4 May 1940	Brighton	Away	L	1-3	Martin (og)	1500	
13 May 1940	Crystal Palace	Away	D	2-2	Mangnall 2	3954	
18 May 1940	Clapton Orient	Home	W	4-0	McEwan, Mangnall, McCarthy, Mallett	2000	2
23 May 1940	Reading	Home	W	2-1	Mangnall, McEwan	1000	
25 May 1940	Norwich City	Away	L	1-3	Mangnall	1500	2
1 June 1940	AFC Bournemouth	Home	W	5-0	Mangnall 2, McCarthy 2, McEwan	1000	2

=== London War Cup ===
Date	Opponents	H / A	Result F–A	Scorers	Attendance
13 April 1940	Southend	Away	0-1		4000

=== Friendlies ===
12 August 1939	Hoops v Reds	H	Practice Match
17 August 1939		.	Practice Match
9 September 1939	The Army	h	Friendly
16 September 1939	Aldershot Town	A	Friendly
23 September 1939	Swindon Town	A	Friendly
30 September 1939	Southend United	A	Friendly
14 October 1939	Luton Town	A	Friendly
14 December 1939	Chelsea	h	Friendly
27 April 1940	Northampton Town	h	Friendly
8 June 1940	Walthamstow Ave	A	Friendly

== Squad ==
Position	Nationality	Name	Total Appearances	Total Goals	Football League Jubilee Appearance	Football League Jubilee Goals	Div 3 South ppearances	Div 3 South Goals	South B League Appearances	South B League Goals	South D League Appearances	South D League Goals
GK	(England)	Reg Allen	6		1		3		2			
GK	(England)	Bill Mason	35						11		9	
DF	(England)	Arthur Jefferson	31		1		3		12		7	
DF	(England)	Ted Reay	19				3		1		8	
DF	(Scotland)	Johnny Barr	9		1	\			5			
DF	(England)	Bill Byrom	1									
DF		James Kelly	7						1			
MF	(England)	Alf Ridyard	13				3				2	
MF	(England)	Harry Daniels	1								1	
MF	(Wales)	Ivor Powell	26						7		9	
MF	(England)	Joe Mallett	35	11	1		1		14	8	8	3
MF	(Scotland)	Alec Farmer	28				1		11		7	
MF	(England)	Dicky March	23	3	1		2		12	2	3	1
MF	(Scotland)	John Devine	2								1	
MF	(England)	Alf Fitzgerald	7		1	2	3		2			
FW	(Scotland)	Billy McEwan	37	19	1		1		13	9	9	10
FW	(Scotland)	Johnny Pattison	3						3			
FW	(England)	Reg Swinfen	6				2	1			1	
FW	(England)	Alec Stock	2				2					
FW	(England)	Dave Mangnall	37	40	1		3	3	14	20	8	17
FW	(England)	Albert Bonass	36	5	1	1	3		10	4	8	1
FW	(England)	Len McCarthy	31	10					13	4	6	6
FW	(England)	Samuel Abel	30						12		4	
FW	(Scotland)	Harry Lowe	18		1		3		2		7	
FW	(England)	Wilf Bott	2								1	
FW		John McColgan	3		1				1		1	
FW		Johnny Reid	2								1	
		Edgar Francis	1									

== Transfers in ==
Name	from	Date	Fee
Francis, Edgar *	Hayes *	July 12, 1939	
Whitehead, Billy	Maltby Colliery	Aug 12, 1939	
Hammond, Albert *		Mar 30, 1940	
Anderson, Fred *	Kensington Sports	Apr 4, 1940	
Daniels, Harry *	Kensington Sports	Apr 4, 1940	
Dumsday, John *		Apr 30, 1940	
Morton, Geoff *		June 8, 1940	
Brown, Harry *		June 8, 1940	
Wilson, Kenrick *		June 8, 1940	

== Transfers out ==
Name	from	Date	Fee	Date	Club	Fee
Smith, Norman	Charlton	May 6, 1937		Chelsea (Trainer)	July 39	
Black, Sammy	Plymouth	Nov 26, 1938	£100	Retired	cs 39	
Urpeth, John *	Erith & Belvedere	Feb 16, 1939		Erith & Belvedere	cs 39	
Cockroft, Bert	Barnsley	Apr 14, 1939			cs 39	
McCristal, John *		Mar 4, 1939			cs 39	
