= 1947–48 Queens Park Rangers F.C. season =

English football club season

Queens Park Rangers
1947–48 season
- Chairman: Albert Hittinger
- Manager: Dave Mangnall
- Stadium: Loftus Road
- Football League Third Division South: 1st
- FA Cup: Quarter Finals
- London Challenge Cup: Quarter Finals
- Top goalscorer: League: Cyril Hatton 21; All: Cyril Hatton 25
- Highest home attendance: 30,567 v Luton Town (7 Feb 1948)
- Lowest home attendance: 13,230 v Newport (6 Dec 1947)
- Biggest win: 5–0 v Brighton (25 Aug 1947)
- Biggest defeat: 0–5 v Derby County (6 Mar 1948)
Home colours	Away colours	Third colours

The 1947-48 Queens Park Rangers season was the club's 57th season of existence and their 3rd in the English Third Division. The team won the Football League Third Division South, securing promotion for the first time. QPR also reached the Quarter-finals of the FA Cup, defeating First Division team Stoke City and Second Division Luton Town before drawing with First Division Derby County and subsequently losing in a replay. At the end of the season, Rangers became the first British club to make an official trip to Turkey.

== League standings ==
Pos	Team	Pld	W	D	L	GF	GA	GAv	Pts	Promotion
1	Queens Park Rangers (C, P)	42	26	9	7	74	37	2.000	61	Promotion to the Second Division
2	Bournemouth & Boscombe Athletic	42	24	9	9	76	35	2.171	57	
3	Walsall	42	21	9	12	70	40	1.750	51	
4	Ipswich Town	42	23	3	16	67	61	1.098	49	
5	Swansea Town	42	18	12	12	70	52	1.346	48	

(C) Champions; (P) Promoted

== Results ==
QPR scores given first

Win Draw Loss

=== Third Division South ===
Date	Opponents	Venue	Result F–A	Scorers	Attendance	Position
23 August 1947	Norwich City	Home	3–1	Hatton, McEwan, Pattison	18704	3
25 August 1947	Brighton	Away	5–0	Hatton 3, Durrant 2	14288	1
30 August 1947	Bristol Rovers	Away	1–0	Durrant	19528	1
4 September 1947	Brighton	Home	2–0	McEwan, Hatton	18116	1
6 September 1947	Northampton	Home	2–0	McEwan, Pattison	21419	1
11 September 1947	Notts County	Away	1–1	Durrant	19335	1
13 September 1947	Aldershot	Away	4–1	Durrant 2, Pattison, Hatton	8915	1
18 September 1947	Notts County	Home	4–1	Pattison 2, Hatton, McEwan	15708	1
20 September 1947	Crystal Palace	Home	1–0	Chapman	25199	1
25 September 1947	Exeter	Home	3–1	Hatton 2, Durrant	18090	1
27 September 1947	Torquay	Away	1–1	Smith G.	10402	1
2 October 1947	Southend	Home	3–2	Hatton 2, Pattison	17585	1
4 October 1947	Swindon	Home	0–2		25092	1
11 October 1947	Swansea City	Away	1–3	Durrant	22171	1
18 October 1947	AFC Bournemouth	Home	1–0	Durrant	21639	1
25 October 1947	Ipswich Town	Away	0–1		24361	1
1 November 1947	Bristol City	Home	2–0	Boxshall, Pattison	28358	1
8 November 1947	Reading	Away	2–3	Durrant, Boxshall	23256	1
15 November 1947	Walsall	Home	2–1	Hatton, Hartburn	26119	1
22 November 1947	Leyton Orient	Away	3–1	Hatton 2, Durrant	16915	1
6 December 1947	Newport	Home	0–0		13230	1
20-Dec-47	Norwich City	a	pp			
26 December 1947	Watford	Away	1–0	Jones (og)	22406	1
27 December 1947	Watford	Home	5–1	Pattison, Boxshall 2, Hatton, McEwan	19373	1
3 January 1948	Bristol Rovers	Home	5–2	McEwan, Hatton, Boxshall 2, Hartburn	22518	1
17-Jan-48	Northampton Town	a	pp			
31 January 1948	Aldershot	Home	0–0		21691	1
7-Feb-48	Crystal Palace	A	pp			
14 February 1948	Torquay	Home	3–3	Ramscar, Boxshall, Hatton	21791	1
21 February 1948	Swindon	Away	0–0		14683	1
28-Feb-48	Swansea Town	h	pp			
6-Mar-48	Bournemouth and Boscombe Athletic	A	pp			
13 March 1948	Ipswich Town	Home	2–0	Hatton, Boxshall	22135	1
15 March 1948	Crystal Palace	Away	1–0	Hartburn	22086	1
20 March 1948	Bristol City	Away	1–2	Boxshall 2	21184	1
26 March 1948	Port Vale	Away	2–0	Boxshall, Hatton	17889	1
27 March 1948	Reading	Home	2–0	Hatton	23998	1
29 March 1948	Port Vale	Home	2–1	Addinall, Smith A.	24053	1
3 April 1948	Walsall	Away	1–0	Addinall	17872	1
8 April 1948	Northampton	Away	1–1	Hartburn	11260	1
10 April 1948	Leyton Orient	Home	1–2	Stewart	27480	1
14 April 1948	AFC Bournemouth	Away	1–0	Durrant	25495	1
17 April 1948	Exeter	Away	2–1	Hartburn 2	11617	1
21 April 1948	Norwich City	Away	2–5	Hatton, Smith A.	30052	1
24 April 1948	Newport	Home	1–0	Powell I.	20905	1
26 April 1948	Swansea City	Home	0–0		27757	1
1 May 1948	Southend	Away	0–0		13827	1

=== FA Cup ===
Date	Round	Opponents	H / A	Result F–A	Scorers	Attendance
10 January 1948	Third Round	Gillingham (Southern League )	Away	1–1 (AET)	Boxshall	23002
17 January 1948	Third Round Replay	Gillingham (Southern League )	Home	3–1	Hartburn, Hatton, McEwan	27500
24 January 1948	Fourth Round	Stoke City (First Division)	Home	3–0	Hatton 2, Ramscar	24200
7 February 1948	Fifth Round	Luton Town (Second Division)	Home	3–1	Hatton, Boxshall, McEwan	30567
28 February 1948	Sixth Round	Derby County (First Division)	Home	1–1	Hartburn	28358
6 March 1948	Sixth Round Replay	Derby County (First Division)	Away	0–5		31588

=== London Challenge Cup ===
Date	Round	Opponents	H / A	Result F–A	Scorers	Attendance
13 October 1947	First Round	Enfield	A	3–1* AET		
27 October 1947	Quarter-Finals	Chelsea	A	1–2* AET		

=== Friendlies ===
Date	Event	Opponents	H / A	Result F–A	Scorers	Attendance
16 August 1947	Practice Match	Whites v Blues	H			
29 November 1947	Friendly	Rotherham	A			
13 December 1947	Friendly	Rotherham	h			
29 April 1948	Friendly	Willesden	A			
3 May 1948	Harry Newman Brentford Hospital Cup Final	Brentford	a			
22 May 1948	Tour of Turkey	Fenerbahce	A	1–1	Durrant	22,000
May 1948	Tour of Turkey	Galatasaray	A	1-0	Hatton	
29 May 1948	Tour of Turkey	Besiktas	A	5–2	Stewart 2, Hatton	
30 May 1948	Tour of Turkey	Turkey Olympic	A	1–2		

== Squad ==
Position	Nationality	Name	League Appearances	League Goals	F..A.Cup Appearances	F.A.Cup Goals	Total Appearances	Total Goals
GK	(England)	Reg Allen	33		6		39	
GK	(England)	Reg Saphin	8		0		8	
DF	(England)	Des Farrow						
DF	(England)	Bill Heath	5		1		6	
DF	(England)	Jack Rose	2		0		2	
DF	(England)	George Powell	23		6		29	
DF	(England)	Arthur Jefferson	26		6		32	
DF	(England)	Reg Dudley	16		0		16	
DF	(England)	Ted Reay	15		0		15	
MF	(England)	Alf Parkinson	1		0		1	
MF	(England)	Alf Ridyard	4		0		4	
MF	(England)	George Smith	37	1	6		43	1
MF	(England)	Harry Daniels	7		4		11	
MF	(Wales)	Ivor Powell	40	1	6		46	1
MF	(England)	Albert Smith	18	2	2		20	2
MF	(Scotland)	Alex Lennon						
MF	(England)	Reg Chapman	14	1	0		14	1
FW	(England)	Bert Addinall	3	2	0		3	2
FW	(England)	Cyril Hatton	34	21	6	4	40	25
FW	(England)	Don Mills	16		0		16	
FW	(England)	Fred Ramscar	16	1	6	1	22	2
FW	(Scotland)	Billy McEwan	25	6	5	2	30	8
FW	(Scotland)	Johnny Pattison	19	8	1		20	8
FW	(England)	Ernie Adams	2		0		2	
FW	(England)	Johnny Hartburn	30	6	5	2	35	8
FW	(Scotland)	George Stewart	14	1	0		14	1
FW	(England)	John Gibbons						
FW	(England)	Fred Durrant	26	12	0		26	12
FW	(Scotland)	Doug Campbell						
FW	(England)	Danny Boxshall	17	11	6	2	23	13

== Transfers in ==
Name	from	Date	Fee
Les Devonshire *		July ?1947	
Stan Hudson *		Aug1947	
Eric Worthington	Willesden Town	Sep1947	
Ernie Adams	Fulham	September 1947	
Fred Ramscar	Wolverhampton Wanderers	Oct 25, 1947	£2,000
John Gibbons	Dartford	December 1947	
Billy Muir	Irvine Meadow	Feb 11, 1948	
Doug Campbell	RAF Spitalgate	March 1948	
James Riddell	Arsenal	Mar 6, 1948	
George Stewart	Brentford	Mar1948	£4,000

== Transfers out ==
Name	from	Date	Fee	Date	Club	Fee
Reg Swinfen	Civil Service	Mar 12, 1936		July? 47	Yeovil Town	
Johnny Barr	Third Lanark	May 24, 1939	Free	Aug 47	Dunfermline Athletic	
Stan Armitage	Charlton	June1946		Aug? 47	Gravesend & Northfleet	Free
Billy Whitehead	Maltby Colliery	Aug 12, 1939		Aug 47	Aldershot	Free
Danny Boxshall	Salem Athletic	Jan 1, 1946		May 48	Bristol C	£2,575
Les Devonshire		July ?1947		May 48	Brentford	
Alf Ridyard	West Bromwich	Mar 16, 1938	£625	June 48	Retired (QPR Trainer)	
Les Borthwick	Jarrow	Oct1946		June? 48		
James Kelly	Cambuslang Rangers	May 20, 1939		June? 48	Guildford City	
