= 1943–44 Queens Park Rangers F.C. season =

English football club season

Queens Park Rangers
1943–44 season
- Chairman: Charles W Fielding
- Manager: Ted Vizard / Dave Mangnall (after 29 April 1944)
- Stadium: Loftus Road
- London League: 3rd
- League Cup (South) Group D: Group
- Top goalscorer: League: All: William Heathcote 36
- Highest home attendance: 15,000 v Arsenal (26 February 1944)
- Lowest home attendance: 4,000 v Clapton Orient (11 December 1943) v Fulham (22 April 1944)
- Average home league attendance: 7,419
- Biggest win: 7–0 v Southampton (30 October 1943)
- Biggest defeat: 2–11 v Chelsea (27 November 1943)
Home colours	Away colours

The 1943–44 Queens Park Rangers season was the club's 53rd season of existence and their 2nd in the London League, part of the Wartime League. QPR finished 3rd in the league, and were eliminated in the group stage of the League Cup.

== League standings ==
=== London League ===
Pos	Team	Pld	W	D	L	GF	GA	Pts
1	Tottenham Hotspur	30	19	8	3	71	36	46
2	West Ham United	30	17	7	6	74	39	41
3	Queen's Park Rangers	30	14	12	4	69	54	40

=== Results ===
League South

Win Draw Loss

=== London League ===
Date	Opponents	Venue	Result	Score F–A	Scorers	Attendance	Position
28 August 1943	Chelsea	A	W	3–1	Heathcote 2, De Busser	9469	4
4 September 1943	Tottenham Hotspur	H	W	1–0	Heathcote	10700	3
11 September 1943	Clapton Orient	A	W	3–2	Heathcote 2, Swinfen	3000	2
18 September 1943	Watford	H	W	3–1	Heathcote 2, Pattison		2
25 September 1943	Portsmouth	A	D	1–1	McEwan	10000	2
2 October 1943	Reading	A	D	0–0		9000	2
9 October 1943	Millwall	H	W	2–0	Mangnall, Burley	9901	2
16 October 1943	Aldershot	H	D	2–2	Mangnall, Heathcote	9391	1
23 October 1943	Brighton	A	L	1–3	Heathcote	3500	3
30 October 1943	Southampton	H	W	7–0	Heathcote 3, Pattison 2, McEwan, Griffiths	7060	1
6 November 1943	West Ham United	A	D	1–1	Heathcote	16100	1
13 November 1943	Arsenal	A	L	0–5		20014	4
20 November 1943	Charlton Athletic	A	L	0–1		3896	4
27 November 1943	Chelsea	H	L	2–11	Swinfen, Pearson	6000	9
4 December 1943	Tottenham Hotspur	A	D	2–2	Heathcote 2	12485	9
11 December 1943	Clapton Orient	H	W	6–2	Swinfen 2, Burley, Heathcote 2, OG	4000	6
18 December 1943	Fulham	A	D	2–2	Sibley, Ramscar	6000	6
25 December 1943	Brentford	A	W	5–2	Somerfield 2, Heathcote 2, Lowes	11200	6
27 December 1943	Brentford	H	W	3–2	Swinfen, Heathcote, Somerfield		4
1 January 1944	Watford	A	D	2–2	Somerfield, Heathcote	4483	4
8 January 1944	West Ham United	H	W	3–0	Heathcote 2, Little	11944	4
15-Jan-44	Portsmouth	h		PP			
22 January 1944	Reading	H	W	2–0	Heathcote 2	4500	3
29 January 1944	Millwall	A	W	4–3	Heathcote, Lowes, Somerfield, Burley	5000	2
5 February 1944	Aldershot	A	W	3–1	Sheen, Lowes, Burley	5000	2
12 February 1944	Brighton	H	W	1–0	Sheen	7200	2
19-Feb-44	Southampton	A		pp			
26-Feb-44	Fulham	h		pp			
4-Mar-44	Arsenal	h		pp			
11-Mar-44	Charlton Athletic	h		pp			
1 April 1944	Southampton	A	D	2–2	De Lisle, Heathcote	4000	
10 April 1944	Portsmouth	H	D	1–1	Mangnall		2
22 April 1944	Fulham	H	D	3–3	Heathcote, Mallett, Jones	4000	2
29 April 1944	Arsenal	H	D	1–1	Jones	10000	2
6 May 1944	Charlton Athletic	H	D	3–3	Heathcote, Lowes 2	6000	3

=== League Cup South (Group D) ===
Date	Opponents	Venue	Result	Score F–A	Scorers	Attendance	Position
19 February 1944	Clapton Orient	A	W	5–2	Swinfen 2, Burley 2, Sibley	2000	3
26 February 1944	Arsenal	H	D	1–1	Swinfen	15000	3
4 March 1944	Luton Town	A	W	4–3	Heathcote 3, Ramscar	3000	2
11 March 1944	Clapton Orient	H	W	6–0	Dean 2, Swinfen 3, Sheen	7000	2
18 March 1944	Arsenal	A	W	4–1	Heathcote, Jones, Swinfen, Sheen	17367	2
25 March 1944	Luton Town	H	W	5–0	Heathcote 3, Swinfen, Jones	6000	2

=== Friendlies ===
8-Apr-44	Brentford	a	Friendly
15-Apr-44	Staines Town	A	Friendly

== Squad ==
Position	Nationality	Name	London League Appearances	London League Goals	League Cup South (Group 1) Apps	League Cup South (Group 1) Goals	Total Appearances	Total Goals
GK	(England)	Harry Brown	24		2		26	
GK	(England)	George Duke	1				1	
GK	(Wales)	William Hughes	1				1	
GK	(England)	Bill Mason	2		1		3	
GK	(England)	Alec Roxburgh	2		3		5	
DF	(England)	Arthur Jefferson	12				12	
DF	(England)	Jack Rose	25		6		31	
DF	(England)	Bill Parry	1				1	
DF	(England)	Fred Alexander	1				1	
MF	(England)	Alf Ridyard	19		1		20	
MF	(England)	Joe Mallett	30	1	5		35	1
MF	(England)	Les Blizzard	1				1	
MF	(England)	Albert Sibley	2	1	2	1	4	2
MF	(England)	Albert Smith	25		6		31	
MF	(England)	Ron Gadsden	7				7	
MF	(England)	Alfred ‘Nobby’ Parkinson	2				2	
MF	(England)	Fred Ramscar	3	1	1	1	4	2
MF		W Dean			1	2	1	2
MF	(England)	Eric Jones	3	2	2	2	5	4
MF	(Belgium)	Emuil De Busser	3	1			3	1
MF		De Lisle	1	1			1	1
MF		F Evans	1				1	
MF	(Scotland)	Matt Gillies	3		3		5	
MF	(England)	Ron Greenwood			1		1	
MF	(England)	James Griffiths	3	1			3	1
MF		R Hutchinson	1				1	
MF		C Little	4	1			4	1
MF	(England)	Arnold Lowes	9	5			9	5
MF		J Martin			1		1	
MF	(England)	Arthur Shaw	1				1	
FW	(Scotland)	Billy McEwan	4	2			4	2
FW	(Scotland)	Johnny Pattison	9	3			9	3
FW	(England)	Reg Swinfen	13	5	5	8	18	13
FW	(England)	Dave Mangnall	13	3		4	17	3
FW	(England)	Samuel Abel	25		6		31	
FW	(England)	Ben Burley	23	4	6	2	29	6
FW	(England)	William Heathcote	28	29	5	7	33	36
FW	(Scotland)	John Sheen	3	2	5	2	8	4
FW		Sid Bacon	1				1	
FW	(England)	Len Dolding	1				1	
FW		Edgar Hardy	1				1	
FW	(Scotland)	Jimmy McLuckie	2				2	
FW	(England)	Stan Pearson	4	1			4	1
FW	(England)	Alf Somerfield	9	5	1	10	5	
FW		J Webb	5				5	
FW	(Belgium)	Hadelin Yielleyoye	1				1	

1

Transfers In

Name	Signed from	Transfer fee	Date signed
Viellevoye, Hadelin * *	Belgian Army		1 September 1943
Jones, George *			1 September 1943
Griffiths, Joseph *			27 October 1943
Alexander, Fred *			15 December 1943
Gillies, Matt	Bolton	Loan	March 1944

Transfers Out

Name	Signed from	Transfer fee	Date signed	Transferred to	Transf.fee	Transf.date
March, Dicky	Crawcrook Albion		3 December 1931	Retired (QPR catering manag.)		1943
Lowe, Harry	Watford		19 June 1935	Retired (Chelsea scout)		1944
