= Griffith =

Griffith may refer to:

== People ==
- Griffith (name)
- Griffith (surname)
- Griffith (given name)

== Places ==
=== Antarctica ===
- Mount Griffith, Ross Dependency
- Griffith Peak (Antarctica), Marie Byrd Land
- Griffith Glacier, Marie Byrd Land
- Griffith Ridge, Victoria Land
- Griffith Nunataks, Victoria Land
- Griffith Island

=== Australia ===
- Griffith, New South Wales, a city
- City of Griffith, a local government area which includes Griffith, New South Wales
- Griffith, Australian Capital Territory, a suburb of Canberra
- Division of Griffith, a parliamentary electorate in Queensland

=== Canada ===
- Griffith Island (Georgian Bay), Ontario
- Griffith Island (Nunavut)

=== United States ===
- Griffith Park, a public park in Los Angeles, California
- Griffith, Indiana, a town and suburb of Chicago
- Griffith Lake, Vermont
- Griffith Peak, Nevada
- Griffith Quarry, near Penryn, California

== Education ==
- Griffith Institute, Oxford, Great Britain
- Griffith University, Queensland, Australia
- Griffith College Dublin, Ireland
- Griffith College Cork, Ireland
- Griffith College Limerick, Ireland
- Griffith High School (Indiana), Griffith, Indiana, US
- Griffith High School (New South Wales, Australia), Griffith, New South Wales, Australia

== Buildings ==
- Griffith Observatory in Los Angeles, California
- Griffith Mansion, Cacheville, California
- Griffith House (Aberdeen, Maryland)
- Griffith Building, Newark, New Jersey
- Griffith Stadium, sports stadium that once stood in Washington, D.C.
- Griffith Barracks, Dublin, Ireland, a former military barracks

== Other uses ==
- Griffith baronets, two extinct titles
- Griffith (Berserk), a character from the manga and anime Berserk
- TVR Griffith series, sports cars
  - TVR Griffith 200
  - TVR Griffith 400

== See also ==
- Griffiths, a surname
- Justice Griffith (disambiguation)
