= Frank McGinn =

Frank McGinn may refer to:

- Frank McGinn (baseball)
- Frank McGinn (footballer)
