= Andrew Griffiths =

Andrew or Andy Griffiths may refer to:

- Andrew Griffiths (field hockey) (born 1969), former field hockey forward from Canada
- Andrew Griffiths (politician) (born 1970), English politician
- Andrew Griffiths (author), Australian author of business books
- Andy Griffiths (author) (born 1961), Australian children's book author
- Andy Griffiths (executive), CEO of consumer appliances at Glen Dimplex

== See also ==
- Andrew Griffith (born 1971), British politician
- Andy Griffith (1926–2012), American actor
