= David Griffiths =

David or Dave Griffiths may refer to:

== Sportsmen ==
- David Griffiths (sport shooter) (1874–1931), British Olympic sports shooter
- David Griffiths (golfer) (born 1980), English professional golfer
- David Griffiths (cricketer) (born 1985), English cricketer
- Dave Griffiths (Australian footballer) (1895–1953), Australian rules footballer
- Dave Griffiths (association footballer) (born 1951), footballer for Tranmere Rovers
- Dave Griffiths (boxer) (1963–2007), British Olympic boxer

== Others ==
- David Griffiths (archdeacon of Berkshire) (1927–2012), Anglican priest
- David Griffiths (archdeacon of Monmouth) (1864–1926), Welsh Anglican priest
- David Griffiths (botanist) (1867–1935), American botanist
- David Griffiths (composer) (born 1950), New Zealand composer, baritone and convener
- David Griffiths (missionary) (1792–1863), British Christian missionary and translator in Madagascar
- David Griffiths (politician) (1896–1977), British politician, member of parliament for Rother Valley
- David Griffiths (co-operative economist), Australian economist
- David J. Griffiths (born 1942), American physicist
- David Griffiths (portrait painter) (born 1939), Welsh artist
- David Rees Griffiths (1882–1953), Welsh poet
- Dave Griffiths (musician) (born 1983), English Christian musician and guitarist

== See also ==
- David Griffith (disambiguation)
