= Walter Griffiths =

Walter Griffiths may refer to:

- Walter Griffiths (politician) (1867–1900), politician in the Northern Territory of Australia
- Walter Griffiths (footballer) (1884–1966), English footballer
- Walter Griffiths (American football), American college football player and coach
- Walter T. Griffiths (1883–1938), Welsh trade union leader

== See also ==
- Walter Griffith (disambiguation)
