= Robert Griffiths =

Robert Griffiths may refer to:

- Robert Griffiths (politician) (born 1952), British communist politician
- Robert Griffiths (physicist) (born 1937), American physicist
- Robert Griffiths (mathematician), Australian statistician
- Robert William Griffiths (1896–1962), Welsh farmer and businessman
- Bob Griffiths (writer) (born 1938), American author, playwright and professional speaker
- Bob Griffiths (priest) (born 1953), Church in Wales priest
- Bob Griffiths (footballer, born 1903) (1903–1970), Scottish footballer for Chelsea
- Bob Griffiths (footballer, born 1907) (1907–1976), Irish footballer
- Bobby Griffiths (born 1942), footballer for Chester City

== See also ==
- Robert Griffith (disambiguation)
