= Griffin Jones =

Griffin Jones may refer to:

- Griffin Jones, character in Dark Matter (2015 TV series)
- Griffin Jones, character in Ejecta (film)

== See also ==
- Griffith Jones (disambiguation)
