= Griffith (given name) =

The given name Griffith may refer to:

- Griffith Bodwrda (1621–1677), Welsh politician and Member of Parliament
- Griffith Borgeson (1918–1997), American race car historian and editor-in-chief of Motor Trend magazine
- Griffith Brewer, pioneer English balloonist and aviator
- Griffith Buck (1915–1991), horticulturalist and professor of horticulture
- Griffith Davies (1788–1855), actuary
- Griffith Edwards, British psychiatrist and researcher
- Griffith Evans (politician) (1869–1943), Australian politician
- Griffith C. Evans (1887–1973), American mathematician
- Griffith W. Griffith (1883–1967), Welsh Presbyterian minister
- Griffith J. Griffith (1850–1919), Welsh-American industrialist and philanthropist
- Griffith Hampden (1543–1591), English politician
- Griffith Hughes (fl. 1707–1758), naturalist and author
- Griffith John (1831–1912), Welsh missionary to China and a pioneer evangelist
- Griffith Jones (disambiguation)
- Griffith Lloyd (died 1586), Principal of Jesus College, Oxford
- Griffith Powell (1561–1620), philosopher and Principal of Jesus College, Oxford
- Griffith Roberts (1845–1943), Anglican priest and author
- Griffith Rutherford (c. 1721 – 1805), American Revolutionary War officer and politician
- Griffith Thomas (1820–1879), American architect
- Griffith Williams (bishop) (1589?-1672), Anglican bishop of Ossory, Ireland
