= David Griffith =

David Griffith may refer to:

- D. W. Griffith (1875–1948), film director
- David Griffith (Clwydfardd) (1800–1894), Welsh poet and Archdruid
- David Griffith (artist), artist whose work has appeared in role-playing games
- David Griffith (bobsleigh), British Olympic bobsledder
- David Griffith (priest) (1936–2024), Welsh Anglican priest
- David Griffith (comics), a character appearing in Marvel Comics

== See also ==
- David Griffiths (disambiguation)
