= Robert Griffith (disambiguation) =

Robert Griffith (born 1970) is a former American football player.

Robert Griffith may also refer to:

- Robert Griffith (MP) (1501/02–1568), MP for Salisbury
- Robert Griffith (MP for Caernarvon Boroughs), in 1593, MP for Caernarvon Boroughs (UK Parliament constituency)
- Robert Griffith (historian) (1940–2011), American historian
- Bob Griffith (1912–1977), baseball player
- Robert E. Griffith (died 1961), producer

== See also ==
- Robert Griffiths (disambiguation)
