= Fred Keeble =

English footballer

Personal information
- Full name: Walter Frederick Keeble
- Date of birth: 30 August 1919
- Place of birth: Coventry, England
- Date of death: 8 May 1987 (aged 67)
- Place of death: Nuneaton, England
- Height: 5 ft 9 in (1.75 m)
- Position: Inside forward

Senior career*
Years	Team	Apps	(Gls)
1935–1936	Coventry City	0	(0)
1943–1946	Albion Rovers		
1946–1947	Grimsby Town	7	(0)
1947–1948	Notts County	4	(1)
- * Club domestic league appearances and goals

Walter Frederick Keeble (30 August 1919 – 8 May 1987) was an English professional footballer who played as an inside forward.
