= Griffith Lake =

Lake and campsite in Vermont, United States

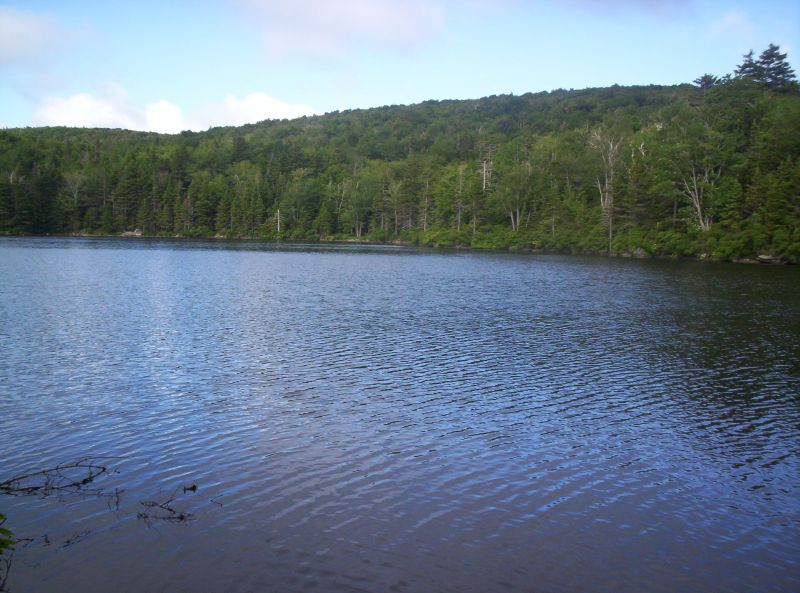
- Griffith Lake from the Long Trail

- Location within Vermont Location within the United States
- Location: Green Mountains, Bennington / Rutland counties, Vermont
- Coordinates: 43°18′10″N 72°57′33″W
- Basin countries: United States
- Surface elevation: 2,605 ft (794 m)

Griffith Lake is a small lake and campsite located in the towns of Peru and Mount Tabor, Vermont, in the Green Mountain National Forest. The site lies on the Long Trail/Appalachian Trail. The area is maintained by the Green Mountain Club and has an on-site caretaker to maintain the tent sites, outhouse, composting toilets, and trails during the peak season. During that time, there is a $5 charge for the overnight use of the tent platforms and nearby lean-to shelter. As there are no 'safe' water sources, hikers should be prepared to use a camping-grade water purification system, or to boil their water.

Access to Griffith lake is through a combination walking/snowmobile trail. Horses, motorized vehicles, and mountain bikes are not permitted on the access trail.
