= Wilf Whitfield =

English footballer

Personal information
- Full name: Wilfred Whitfield
- Date of birth: 17 November 1916
- Place of birth: Chesterfield, England
- Date of death: 18 February 1995 (aged 78)
- Place of death: Hamilton, Scotland
- Position: Left half

Senior career*
Years	Team	Apps	(Gls)
- Birtley
–1938	Worksop Town		
1938–1949	Bristol Rovers	26	(1)
1949–1951	Torquay United	47	(1)
- Bath City
- * Club domestic league appearances and goals

Wilfred Whitfield (17 November 1916 – 18 February 1995) was an English professional footballer who played in the Football League for Torquay United and Bristol Rovers as a left half.

== Personal life ==
Whitfield served as a corporal in the British Army during the Second World War.
