= Tommy Hassell =

English footballer

Personal information
- Full name: Thomas William Hassell
- Date of birth: 5 April 1919
- Place of birth: Eastleigh, England
- Date of death: April 1984 (aged 64–65)
- Place of death: Hove, England
- Position: Inside left

Senior career*
Years	Team	Apps	(Gls)
19??–1946	Southampton	0	(0)
1946–1950	Aldershot	114	(16)
1950–1951	Brighton & Hove Albion	11	(4)
1951–1954	Folkestone Town		
1954–1958	Lewes		
1958–19??	Bexhill Town		
- Newhaven
- * Club domestic league appearances and goals

Thomas William Hassell (5 April 1919 – April 1984) was an English professional footballer who played as an inside left in the Football League for Aldershot and Brighton & Hove Albion.

== Life and career ==
Hassell was born in Eastleigh, Hampshire, in 1919. He joined Southampton as a youngster, and played for them in the wartime competitions, as well as making guest appearances for a variety of other clubs, but moved on to Aldershot before the Football League resumed in 1946. In a four-year spell, Hassell made 114 appearances in the Football League Third Division South for Aldershot. He spent the 1950–51 season as a part-time professional with another Third Division club, Brighton & Hove Albion, for which he had played during the war, and then spent another three years with Folkestone Town. In 1954, he resumed amateur status and acted as player-coach of Sussex County League club Lewes for four seasons, and then played for Bexhill Town and Newhaven.

He returned to Albion as assistant trainer from 1964 to 1967. Outside football, Hassell worked in the Brighton railway workshops as a fitter. He died in Hove, Sussex, in 1984.
