= Dave Griffiths (association footballer) =

English footballer

Personal information
- Full name: David Bernard Griffiths
- Date of birth: 25 May 1951 (age 75)
- Place of birth: Liverpool, England
- Position: Full back

Senior career*
Years	Team	Apps	(Gls)
1969–1970	Tranmere Rovers	6	(0)
- * Club domestic league appearances and goals

Dave Griffiths (born 25 May 1951) is an English footballer, who played as a full back in the Football League for Tranmere Rovers.
