= Griffith Jones =

Griffith Jones may refer to:

- Griffith Jones (Llanddowror) (1684–1761), Llanddowror, who established circulating schools in Wales
  - Ysgol Griffith Jones, Carmarthenshire, UK, a school named after the educator
- Griffith Jones (mayor), appointed to the Supreme Court of Pennsylvania in 1690, later Mayor of Philadelphia
- Griffith Jones (actor) (1909–2007), actor, who played Caryl Sanger in the film Escape Me Never (1935)
- Griffith Jones (priest) (1684–1761), Welsh Anglican priest who promoted Methodism
- Griffith Arthur Jones (1827–1906), Welsh Anglican priest
- Griffith Hartwell Jones (died 1944), Professor of Latin at the University of Wales, Cardiff
- Griff Rhys Jones (born 1953), British comedian, writer, and actor
- Griffith Rhys Jones (1834-1897), Welsh conductor
- Mervyn Griffith-Jones (1909-1979), British lawyer and judge

== See also ==
- Griffin Jones (disambiguation)
