= Andrew Griffiths (author) =

Australian small business author

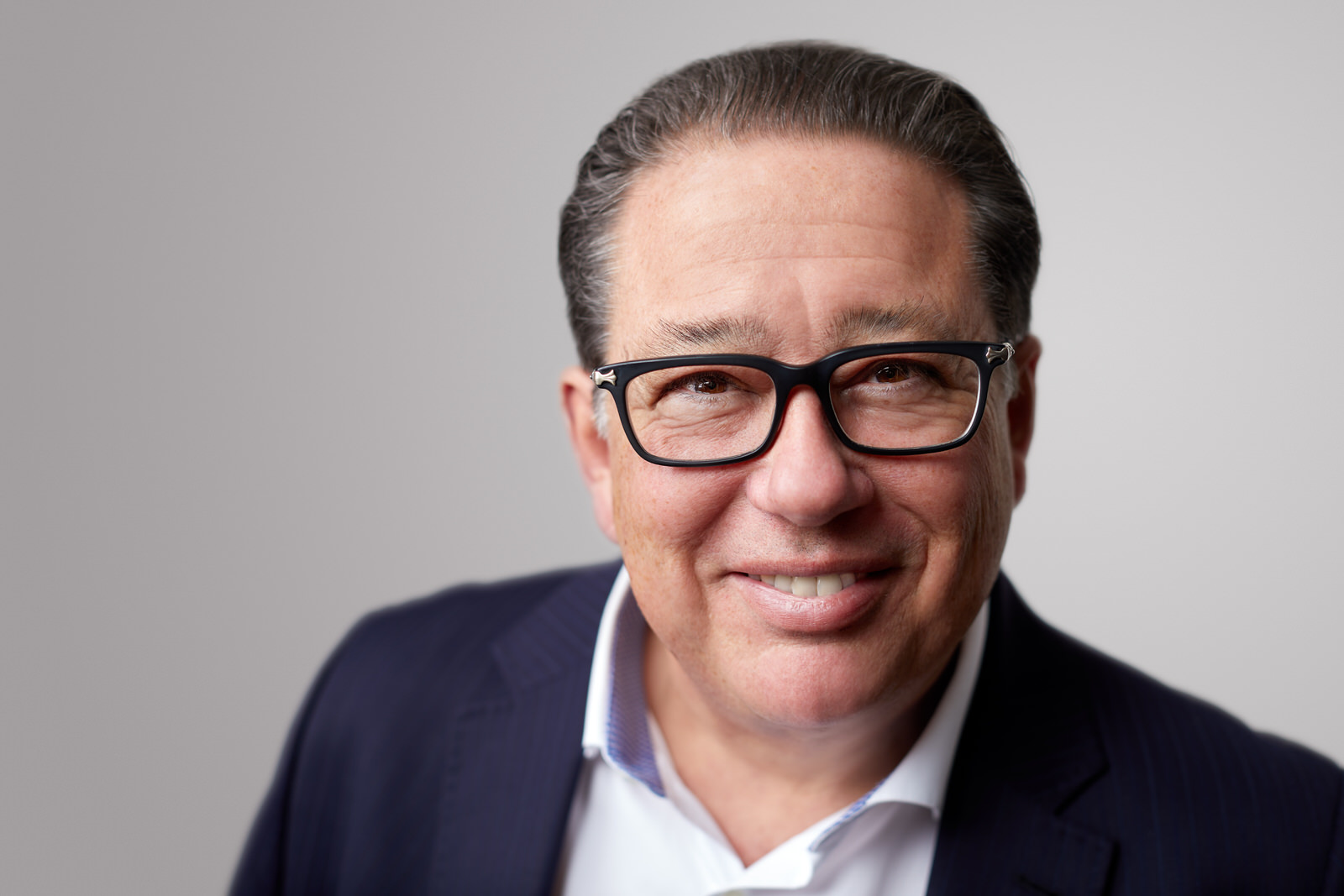
- Australian business author Andrew Griffiths
- Occupation: Author
- Writing career
- Language: English
- Genre: Non fiction

Andrew Griffiths is an Australian small business author who has written 13 books – 11 business books published by Allen & Unwin, one self-help book published by Simon & Schuster and one co-written with magazine publisher Bree James and published by Michael Hanrahan Publishing. His books are sold in over 50 countries and translated into Hindi, Chinese, Vietnamese, Indonesian and Russian.

== Career ==
His first book, 101 Ways to Market Your Business, was published on 10 October 2000 by Allen & Unwin. He wrote a total of seven books in the 101 Ways business building series and co-authored Secrets of Marketing Experts Exposed. He is also a motivational speaker and presenter. In 2011, he was invited to be a keynote speaker at the Million Dollar Round Table Conference in California and was part of Virgin founder Sir Richard Branson’s speaking club at the Financial Education Summit in Melbourne, also in 2011. He is also an international publishing mentor for the entrepreneurial program Key Person of Influence, which operates in the UK, US, Australia and Singapore. In 2015, he was a presenter at the TEDx conference in Townsville, entitled "Imagine if we were 33% less angry". Andrew is also the author of hundreds of business articles for New York’s INC.com and entrepreneurial editorials for Flying Solo and is co-author and co-presenter of the Business Over Breakfast podcast show.

== Early life ==
Griffiths and his sister Wendy were abandoned by their parents when he was six months old and she was 18 months. They were left with their mother’s 74-year-old neighbour, who abused them before welfare officers rescued them. Due to his unusual childhood, he does not have a birth certificate, but believes he was born in early 1966.

== Personal life ==
Griffiths lives in Hobart, Tasmania.

== Bibliography ==
- 101 Ways to Market Your Business (October 2000), Allen & Unwin, ISBN 9781741750058
- 101 Ways to Boost your Business (March 2002), Allen & Unwin, ISBN 9781741750065
- 101 Ways to Really Satisfy Your Customers (October 2002), Allen & Unwin, ISBN 9781741750089
- 101 Ways to Advertise Your Business (April 2004), Allen & Unwin, ISBN 9781741750072
- 101 Ways to Have a Business and a Life (June 2007), Allen & Unwin, ISBN 9781741147872
- 101 Secrets to Building a Winning Business (August 2008), Allen & Unwin, ISBN 9781741755671
- 101 Secrets to Build a Successful Network Marketing Business (April 2008), Allen & Unwin, ISBN 9781741149593
- 101 Ways to Sell More of Anything to Anyone (May 2009), Allen & Unwin, ISBN 9781741147889
- Bulletproof Your Business NOW(August 2009), Allen & Unwin, ISBN 9781741759891
- The ME MYTH (September 2009), Simon & Schuster ISBN 978-0731814251
- The Big Book of Small Business (August 2011), Allen & Unwin, ISBN 9781742374284
- Business over Breakfast (July 2017), MH Publishing, ISBN 9780987406668
- Someone has to be the most expensive, why not make it you? (October 2020), Publish Central, ISBN 9781922391513
