= Chale Silva =

Costa Rican footballer (1919–2009)

Personal information
- Full name: Carlos Alberto Silva Loaiza
- Date of birth: 10 July 1919
- Place of birth: San José, Costa Rica
- Date of death: 23 July 2009 (aged 90)
- Place of death: Costa Rica
- Position: Defender

Senior career*
Years	Team	Apps	(Gls)
1936–1943	Orión		
1944	La Libertad		
1944–1947	Moctezuma de Orizaba		
1948	La Libertad		
1948–1950	Universidad de Bogotá	47	(0)
1951	Once Deportivo	31	(0)
1952	Deportivo Manizales	21	(0)
1953–1954	Deportivo Sula		
1958	Uruguay de Coronado		

International career
1941–1947	Costa Rica	7	
- * Club domestic league appearances and goals

Carlos Alberto Silva Loaiza(10 July 1919 – 23 July 2009), commonly known as Chale Silva, was a Costa Rican professional footballer who played in the Colombian Professional Football League and Mexican Primera División.

== Club career ==
Born in San José to Lizandro Silva LeRois and Zeneida Loaiza Infante, Silva played as a defender. He began his career with Segunda Division side Orión F.C., helping the club win promotion to the Costa Rican Primera División. He made his Primera debut with Orión on 7 August 1936, and captained the club to a title-winning, undefeated season in 1943. He joined rivals C.S. La Libertad the following season.

Silva began playing professional football with Mexican Primera División side Moctezuma de Orizaba in 1944. After three seasons in Mexico, he played professionally in Colombia where he signed with Universidad de Bogotá in 1948. He also played for Colombian sides Once Deportivo and Deportivo Manizales.

He finished his 27-year playing career with Deportivo Sula in Honduras and C.S. Uruguay de Coronado in his home country.

== International career ==
Silva made several appearances for the Costa Rica national team, helping the side win the 1941 CCCF Championship unbeaten in six matches.

== Personal life ==
Silva was married to Aracely Arguedas and had four children. He died aged 90 in July 2009.
