= Alan Griffiths (cricketer) =

English cricketer (1957–2023)

Personal information
- Full name: Alan Griffiths
- Born: 18 September 1957; Newcastle-under-Lyme, Staffordshire, England
- Died: 20 January 2023 (aged 65)
- Nickname: Frinty
- Batting: Right-handed
- Role: Wicket-keeper

Domestic team information
- Years: Team
- 1981–1985: Minor Counties
- 1979–1989: Staffordshire

Career statistics
Competition	First-class	List A
Matches	1	12
Runs scored	26	119
Batting average	26.00	11.90
100s/50s	0/0	0/0
Top score	26	33
Catches/stumpings	–/–	9/3
- Source: Cricinfo, 21 June 2011

Alan Griffiths (18 September 1957 – 20 January 2023) was an English cricketer. Griffiths was a right-handed batsman who fielded as a wicket-keeper. He was born in Newcastle-under-Lyme, Staffordshire.

Griffiths made his debut for Staffordshire in the 1979 Minor Counties Championship against Cheshire. Griffiths played Minor counties cricket for Staffordshire from 1979 to 1989, which included 88 Minor Counties Championship matches and 7 MCCA Knockout Trophy matches. It was however for the Minor Counties cricket team that he made his List A debut for against Surrey in the 1981 Benson & Hedges Cup. 1981 also saw Griffiths make his only first-class appearance for the Minor Counties against the touring Sri Lankans (then still one year away from Test status). He batted once in this match, scoring 26 runs before being dismissed by Ajit de Silva. He did however play 6 further List A matches for the team, the last coming against Hampshire in the 1985 Benson & Hedges Cup. In his 7 matches for the team, he scored 73 runs at an average of 14.60, with a high score of 17. Behind the stumps he took 4 catches and made a single stumping.

Griffiths appeared in List A cricket for Staffordshire as well, making his first appearance for the county in that format against Gloucestershire in the 1984 NatWest Trophy. He made 4 further appearances in List A cricket for Staffordshire, playing his last match in that format against Surrey in the 1988 NatWest Trophy. In his 5 matches for the county, he scored 46 runs at an average of 9.20, with a high score of 33. Behind the stumps he took 5 catches and made 2 stumpings.

Griffiths died in January 2023, at the age of 65.
