= Fred Crack =

English footballer

Personal information
- Full name: Frederick William Crack
- Date of birth: 12 January 1919
- Place of birth: Lincoln, England
- Date of death: 2002 (aged 82–83)
- Place of death: Scarborough, England
- Height: 5 ft 11 in (1.80 m)
- Position: Winger

Senior career*
Years	Team	Apps	(Gls)
1934–1935	Lincoln CSOB		
1935–1947	Grimsby Town	28	(7)
1945-1946	→ Queens Park Rangers (guest)	3	(3)
1947–19??	Lincoln CSOB		
- * Club domestic league appearances and goals

Frederick William Crack (12 January 1919 – 2002) was an English professional footballer who played as a winger.
