= Gib Bellis =

Welsh footballer

Personal information
- Full name: Thomas Gilbert Bellis
- Date of birth: 21 April 1919
- Place of birth: Mold, Flintshire, Wales
- Date of death: 1 September 2000 (aged 81)
- Place of death: Mold, Flintshire, Wales
- Position: Wing-half

Senior career*
Years	Team	Apps	(Gls)
- Buckley Town
1938–1949	Wrexham	95	(1)
- Holywell Town
- * Club domestic league appearances and goals

Thomas Gilbert "Gib" Bellis (21 April 1919 – 1 September 2000) was a Welsh professional footballer who played as a wing-half. He made appearances in the English Football League for Wrexham.
