= Griffith Mansion =

19th-century house in California, United States

Coordinates: 38.73027°N 121.80704°W

The Griffith House is a historic residence which remains a private family home on 14 acres (5.7 ha) in Yolo, California (previously known as Cacheville, 5 miles (8.0 km) outside of Woodland), built by Abram Griffith in 1886.

== History ==
=== Abraham Griffith (1822–1893) ===
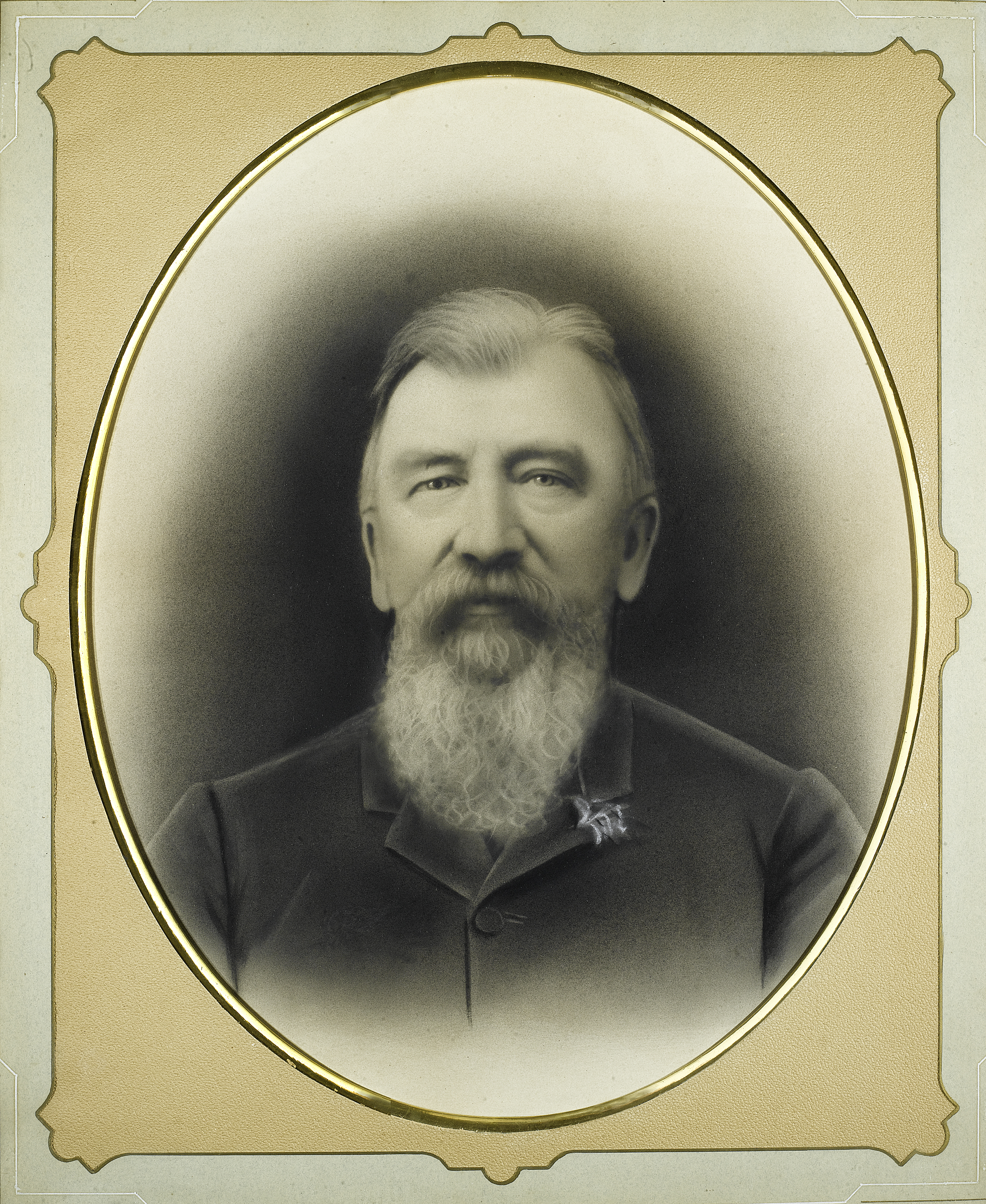
Abraham (Abram) Griffith, 1822–1893. Builder of the Griffith Mansion (1886). Original Portrait.

A native of Newcastle-under-Lyme, Staffordshire, England, Abraham Griffith was born September 17, 1822. At the age of 22, Griffith came to America in 1844, arriving in New York City, where he resided until 1849. News of the California Gold Rush excitement had spread and Mr. Griffith was introduced to one of the Aspinwalls, a founder of the Pacific Mail Steamship Company, and given a position as stoker on the steamship Panama. Leaving New York on December 1, 1848, they were out only five days when the ship suffered mechanical difficulty and was forced to set sail back to New York. That winter, Mr. Griffith worked as a clerk in a store until July 15, 1849, when he again was given the opportunity to work for his passage to California, this time on the steamer Empire City to the Isthmus of Panama, then aboard the steamer Oregon, arriving in San Francisco on September 16, 1849.

On the night of October 2, he camped on the bank of Cache Creek (Sacramento River) where Cacheville was situated. He and his friend helped an old man by the name of Thomas Cochran build a hut for a country tavern and, soon after, proceeded on their way to the northern mines. During the next summer he worked in the Trinity mines, saving about $500, soon stolen from him by a deceitful fellow traveler. He returned to Cacheville, repulsed with mining, and worked as a cook for Mr. Cochran he had earlier met. In the fall of 1851 Mr. Cochran left for Australia, owing Mr. Griffith and others a significant amount of money, and was never since heard from — except in a letter from San Francisco to Mr. Griffith. Griffith then managed a hotel along with a man by the name of William Hammack until the autumn of 1852, when J. A. Hutton, who owned land nearby, came with his wife and they and Hammack became proprietors. In the fall of 1853 they opened a store and hired Mr. Griffith as clerk, for a salary of $75 a month with board.

In December, 1854, Mr. Griffith married Mary Rush, who had crossed the plains that year. Soon after, in 1855, Mr. Griffith bought out Mr. Hammack and the firm became Hutton & Griffith.

In 1857 the county-seat was removed from Washington to Cacheville. Hutton & Griffith sold out and, in 1859, Griffith bought out the store of White & Weaver, at Cacheville; there were then several mercantile establishments in the place. In 1861, Mr. Griffith purchased the store of H. C. Yerby, the first brick store in the town, if not in the county, and he succeeded J. A. Hutton (who had been county judge of Yolo many years) as Postmaster. Mr. Griffith also became agent for the Wells Fargo Express Company, a position he held for about sixteen years.

He had a family of three daughters and five sons, with little Jennie laid to rest in the cemetery at the age of three, in 1868. Griffith retired in 1880 and in September 1885, while in San Francisco with his wife and four youngest boys, his house burned down with no insurance.

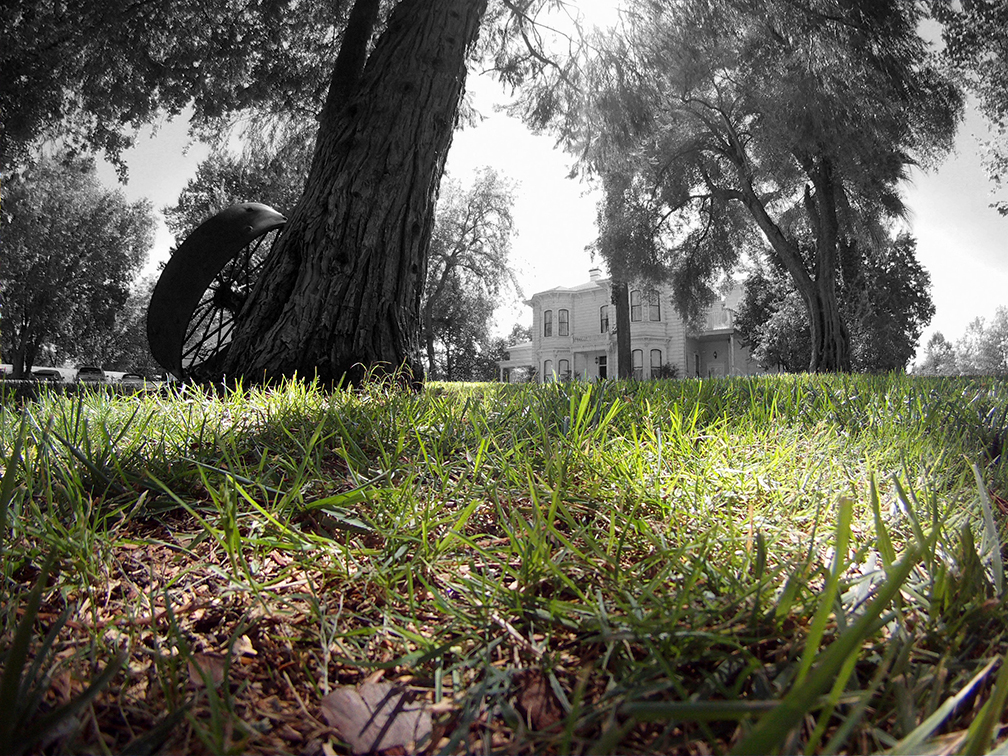
Front.

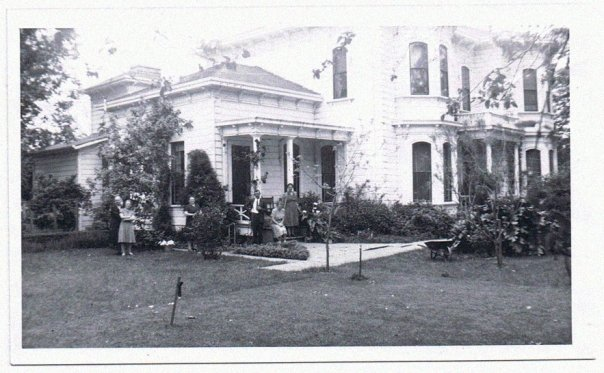
Earliest known photo of residence.

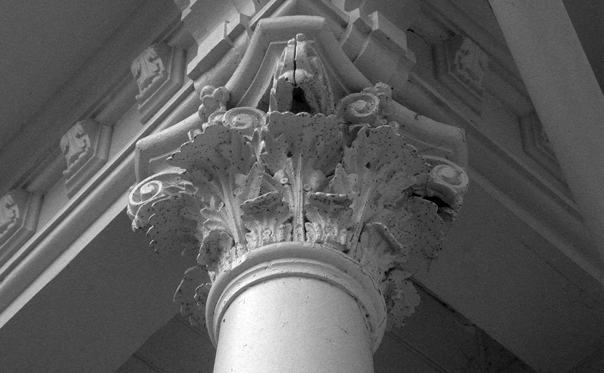
Exterior corinthian column detail.

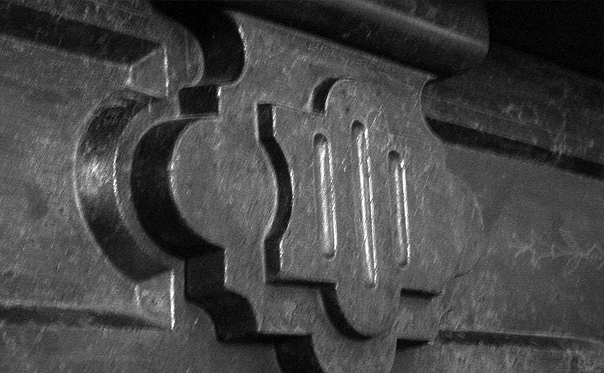
Original interior detail.

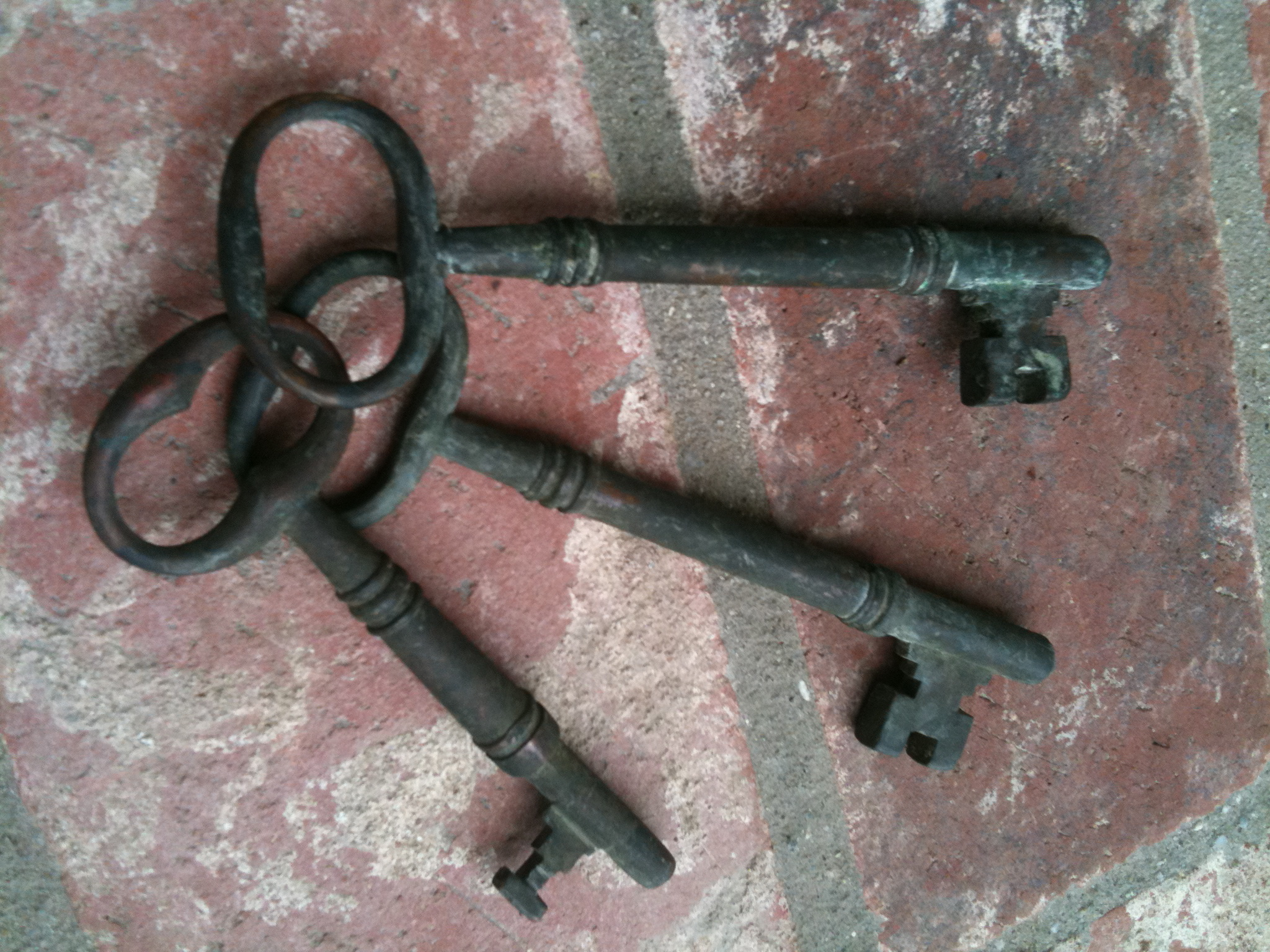
Original keys.

=== The Griffith Residence ===
In 1886, Abram Griffith built a fine Victorian residence of Italianate architecture upon 20 acres (81,000 m^{2}) of land in Cacheville, California (now Yolo). This High Victorian Italianate residence exists as the grand dame of the homes in the town, sitting on the edge of the commercial district on a large spacious lot on the bank of the Cache Creek, just outside Woodland. The residence boasts prominent bay windows, keystone arched, sash windows throughout, scrolled brackets at the eaves and classical corinthian columns complete the ornamentation. What came to be known as the Griffith Mansion, the residence was built upon the ancient site of an Indian burial ground. While digging to lay the foundation for the chimneys, the bones of an Indian buried in sitting position were discovered. There was a hole in the top of the skull, the brains had been removed and hand-made Indian money put in its place when he was buried. He was probably a Digger of note among his tribe as a financier, and perhaps thought money would be of more use than brains in the hunting grounds.

The residence remained a home to the Griffith family until 1935, then sold to the Hugo Maassen family, who were said to never have occupied the upper levels. The property was then purchased by a Bay Area family who were searching for a historic estate after involvement in the restoration of the Snowball Mansion in nearby Knights Landing. The residence underwent extensive restoration during a 15-year span, restoring the home to its original charm as well as adding up-to-date necessities and conveniences. The home is still owned and cared for by the family today.

In May 1998, during the process of having an in-ground pool excavated, contractors uncovered a 400 to 500-year-old Native American village or burial ground, likely inhabited by the Patwin tribe. The coroner and Native American Heritage Commission were contacted, and the anthropology department of UC Davis was called in to recover the unearthed artifacts.

For six days, volunteers, UC Davis undergraduate students and professors, spent 240 hours on-site collecting materials and studying the dig. Along with arrowheads, spear points, cutting tools, beads, animal and human skeletal remains, excavators uncovered delicate chert drills - an important discovery because they are believed to have been used to perforate marine clam shells to make beads, which became their currency.

The anthropology department was responsible for finding the most likely descendants of the remains found. They then brought the owners who discovered the remains into contact with the descendant. In this case, the most likely descendant had allowed the excavation of the pool after studies were complete and also allowed UC Davis to study the artifacts for an additional year, after which time the skeletal remains and associated grave possessions would have to be reburied on the property in a secluded area where they would be left untouched.

== Notable surrounding buildings ==
- Gable Mansion
- Gibson Mansion
- Woodland Opera House
- Yolo County Courthouse
