= Gwenny Griffiths =

British artist (1867–1953)

- Born: Rosa Gwenny Griffiths; 25 June 1867; Swansea, Wales
- Died: 22 December 1953 (aged 86); Cannes, France
- Education: Swansea Art School; Slade School of Art; Académie Julian; Académie Colarossi
- Known for: Portrait painting

Rosa Gwenny Griffiths (25 June 1867 – 22 December 1953) was a Welsh artist known for her portrait and flower paintings.

== Biography ==
Griffiths was born in the Druslyn area of Swansea in south Wales and attended Swansea Art School before studying at the Slade School of Art in London where she was taught by Alphonse Legros. After graduating from the Slade, Griffiths then studied in Paris at the Académie Julian and the Académie Colarossi. She first exhibited in London in 1892 with the Society of British Artists, showing a painting titled Madame Chrysantheme, and then regularly at the Royal Academy and the Royal Society of Portrait Painters. On occasion she showed works in Budapest at the Salon Nemzeti and in 1914 had works shown at the Paris Salon. Griffiths was a member of the Women's International Art Club and during 1906 and 1907 served as the club's honorary secretary. She had a solo exhibition at the Glynn Vivian Art Gallery in Swansea in 1922. Griffiths painted a number of notable portraits. Her subjects included Dame Margaret Lloyd George, Lord Justice Banks, the Viscountess Hawarden and the trustees of Swansea Hospital. For a time Griffiths lived in Cannes but spent the duration of World War II in Wales and then returned to France when the conflict ended.

Griffiths died in Cannes on 22 December 1953, aged 86.
