= John Finlay (footballer) =

English footballer

John (Jack) Finlay
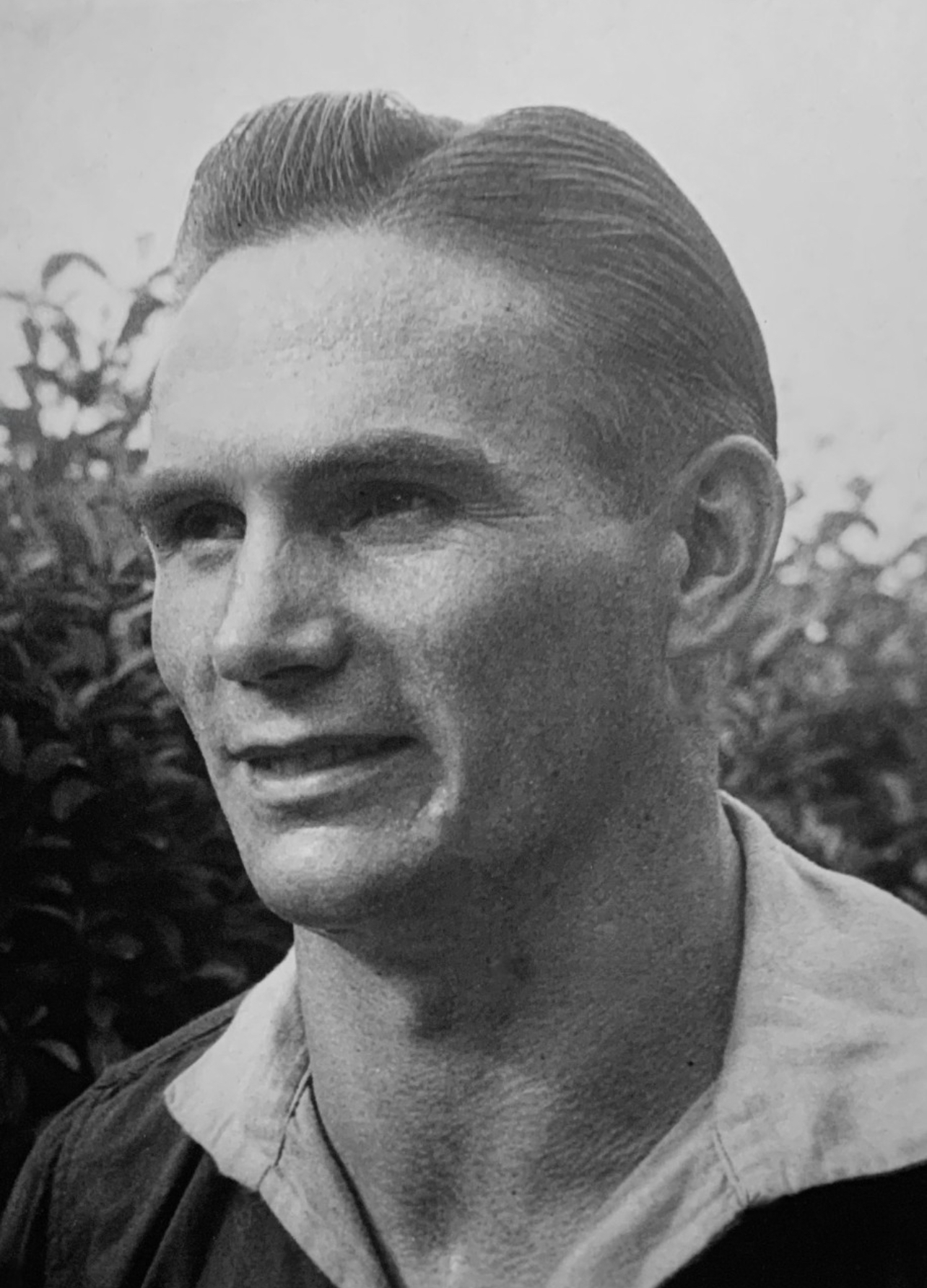

Personal information
- Full name: John Finlay
- Date of birth: 15 February 1919
- Place of birth: Birtley, England
- Date of death: 5 March 1985 (aged 66)
- Place of death: Cleveland, England
- Height: 1.78 m (5 ft 10 in)
- Position: Inside forward

Youth career
- 1937–1938: Ouston Juniors

Senior career*
Years	Team	Apps	(Gls)
1938–1947	Sunderland	1	(0)
- * Club domestic league appearances and goals

John Finlay (16 February 1919 – 5 March 1985) was an English professional footballer born in Birtley who played as an inside forward for Grimsby Town, Sunderland, and Carlisle United. Finlay signed for Sunderland in 1938, then played as a guest player for Carlisle United in the 1939/1940 season but due to WWII, had to wait to make his debut for Sunderland on 11 September 1946 in their 4th match of the season in Division 1 against Charlton Athletic. Finlay retired from professional football just two months later in November 1946.
