= Dave Griffiths (Australian footballer) =

Australian rules footballer

Personal information
- Full name: David Griffiths
- Born: 4 December 1895; Ballarat East, Victoria
- Died: 1 June 1953 (aged 57); Caulfield, Victoria
- Original team: Railways / Kalgoorlie City
- Height: 185 cm (6 ft 1 in)
- Weight: 91 kg (201 lb)

Playing career^{1}
Years	Club	Games (Goals)
1923	Richmond	10 (7)
1924	St Kilda	4 (1)
Total		14 (8)
- ^{1} Playing statistics correct to the end of 1924.

David Griffiths (4 December 1895 – 1 June 1953) was an Australian rules footballer who played with Richmond and St Kilda in the Victorian Football League (VFL).
