= Frederick Alexander (cricketer) =

English cricketer

Personal information
- Full name: Frederick Russell Alexander
- Born: 4 June 1924; Acton Green, Middlesex
- Died: 17 May 1984 (aged 59); Harrow, London
- Batting: Right handed
- Bowling: Right-arm off-break Right-arm medium

Career statistics
Competition	First-class
Matches	2
Runs scored	15
Batting average	5
100s/50s	0/0
Top score	8
Catches/stumpings	0/0
- Source: ESPNcricinfo, 10 December 2019

Frederick Alexander
Personal information
- Full name: Frederick Russell Alexander
- Date of birth: 4 June 1924
- Place of birth: Acton Green, Middlesex
- Date of death: 17 May 1984 (aged 59)
- Place of death: Harrow, London
- Position: Centre-back
1945-1946	→ Queens Park Rangers (guest)	2	(0)
?	Charlton		
?	Dartford		
?	Margate		

Frederick Russell Alexander (4 June 1924 – 17 May 1984) was an English cricketer. He was a right-handed batsman and a right-arm medium pace and off-break bowler who played for Middlesex during the 1951 season. He was born in Acton Green and died in Harrow, London.

Alexander represented Middlesex in two County Championship games during the 1951 season, making his debut against Surrey and following this up with a game against Sussex two weeks later. Alexander was a lower-middle order batsman who also played five games for the team in the Minor Counties Championship, but was unable to score enough runs to secure a permanent place in the side.

Alexander also played football as a centre-back, and was on the books of league teams QPR and Charlton Athletic, but never made senior appearances for either. He played for Dartford and Margate in the Kent Football League. Alexander's transfer from Dartford to Charlton Athletic set a record for a non-league club, as he and Riley Cullum were bought for £6,000.
