= Arnold Lowes =

English footballer

Personal information
- Full name: Arnold Richardson Lowes
- Date of birth: 27 February 1919
- Place of birth: Sunderland, England
- Date of death: 2 July 1994 (aged 75)
- Place of death: Sheffield, England
- Position: Wing half

Senior career*
Years	Team	Apps	(Gls)
–1937	Washington Chemical Works		
1937–1948	Sheffield Wednesday	42	(8)
1948–1950	Doncaster Rovers	72	(3)
- * Club domestic league appearances and goals

Arnold Richardson Lowes (27 February 1919 – 2 July 1994) was an English professional footballer who played in the Football League for Doncaster Rovers and Sheffield Wednesday as a wing half.

== Career statistics ==
Appearances and goals by club, season and competition
Club	Season	League			FA Cup		Total	
Club	Season	Division	Apps	Goals	Apps	Goals	Apps	Goals
Sheffield Wednesday	1938–39	Second Division	6	2	0	0	6	2
Sheffield Wednesday	1946–47	Second Division	21	3	0	0	21	3
Sheffield Wednesday	1947–48	Second Division	14	3	2	2	16	5
Career total			42	8	2	2	44	10
