= Vittorio Dagianti =

Italian footballer and coach

Personal information
- Date of birth: 10 May 1919
- Place of birth: Rome, Italy
- Date of death: 4 June 1994 (aged 75)
- Position: Midfielder

Senior career*
Years	Team	Apps	(Gls)
1938–1941	Lazio	25	(4)
1941–1942	Salernitana		
1942–1943	Roma	16	(2)
1943–1944	Rutigliano		
1944–1945	Lazio	10	(2)
1945–1946	Roma	31	(2)
1946–1949	Salernitana	91	(?)
1949–1951	Napoli	33	(5)
1951–1952	Chieti	22	(1)

Managerial career
- Stefer Roma
- * Club domestic league appearances and goals

Vittorio Dagianti (born 10 May 1919 in Rome; died 4 June 1994) was an Italian professional football player and coach.

He played for 6 seasons (82 games, 7 goals) in the Serie A for S.S. Lazio, A.S. Roma, Salernitana Calcio 1919 and S.S.C. Napoli.
