= Andy Griffiths (executive) =

- Born: Perth, Australia
- Occupation: CEO of consumer appliances at Glen Dimplex
- Known for: President of UK & Ireland at Samsung Electronics

Andy Griffiths is the current CEO of consumer appliances at Glen Dimplex since October 2016. Before his appointment, he was a non-executive director at the firm from April 2016 to September 2016.

Griffiths previously served as the President of UK & Ireland, managing director and vice president of consumer electronics at Samsung Electronics, as well as being an adviser to SH Jo, then-president and CEO of Samsung UK & Ireland, and members of the Samsung UK leadership team. He was also vice president of marketing communications for Europe at Sony Electronics.

== Early life ==
Born in Australia, Griffins moved to England as a teenager and began his career at electronics retailer Rumbelows at the age of 14. By the age of 21, he was the youngest area manager in the south east

== Career ==
=== Sony ===
Griffiths joined Sony in 1993 and held a number of sales and marketing positions prior to being named as vice-president of marketing communications for Europe in November 2003. His role covered more than 30 markets, including Russia and Central Europe and he was also responsible for developing new advertising channels and making the most of Sony’s relationships with brand extensions, such as PlayStation and Sony Ericsson.

=== Samsung ===
Griffiths joined Samsung in 2005 and was appointed managing director of Samsung Electronics UK and Ireland in 2011, leading the consumer electronics, mobile and IT divisions. Prior to this, he served as vice president of consumer electronics at Samsung UK and Ireland, and oversaw the launch of Samsung’s first 3D TV and Smart TV. In January 2014, Griffiths was appointed President of UK & Ireland, the first non-Korean to hold this title, until January 2016 when he became an adviser to SH Jo, then-president and CEO of Samsung UK & Ireland, and members of the Samsung UK leadership team.

=== Glen Dimplex ===
Griffiths was a non-executive director at Glen Dimplex from April 2016 to September 2016, before being appointed CEO of consumer appliances in October 2016.
