= Llewelyn Griffiths =

Welsh footballer (1877–1943)

Personal information
- Date of birth: 5 August 1877
- Place of birth: Ruabon, Wales
- Date of death: 15 November 1943 (aged 66)
- Place of death: Wrexham, Wales
- Position: Inside forward

Senior career*
Years	Team	Apps	(Gls)
1896–1899	Rhos Eagle Wanderers		
1899–1908	Wrexham	106	(49)
1908–1911	Johnstown Amateurs		

International career
1902	Wales	1	(0)
- * Club domestic league appearances and goals

Llewelyn Griffiths (5 August 1877 – 15 November 1943) was a Welsh footballer who played as an inside forward for Wrexham in the 1900s.. He was part of the Wales national team, playing one match on 15 March 1902 against Scotland.

== See also ==
- List of Wales international footballers (alphabetical)
