= Arthur Aldred =

English footballer

Personal information
- Date of birth: 27 August 1919
- Place of birth: Atherton, England
- Date of death: 23 May 2002 (aged 82)
- Place of death: Birmingham, England
- Position: Winger

Senior career*
Years	Team	Apps	(Gls)
1946-1948	Aston Villa		
1948-1949	Walsall		
1949-1950	Hereford United		
1950-1951	Cheltenham Town		
1951-1952	Yeovil Town		
1952-1953	Tonbridge Angels		
1953-1954	Kidderminster Harriers		
1954-C.1955	Rugby Town		
- * Club domestic league appearances and goals

Arthur Aldred (27 August 1919 – 23 May 2002) was an English footballer who played as a midfielder.

== Career ==
Aldred joined Aston Villa from Hereford United in 1946, having previously played sporadically for Nottingham Forest in the wartime substitutes competitions during World War II. However, the winger was denied a breakthrough in the first team at Aston Villa and in the summer of 1948 he moved without playing a mandatory game, as did his team-mates Arthur Haynes and Tom Clark, Walsall. Aldred made 11 league and four cup appearances in the first half of the 1947–49 season, scoring one goal in both competitions when he formed the wing-tongs with Jimmy Condie or Lou Tinkler. The last time he played was in a 0-4 FA Cup defeat to Luton Town at the end of January. After his change request was publicly communicated at the beginning of March 1949, he left Walsall at the end of the season and continued his career in the Southern Football League.

He rejoined Hereford and then played for Cheltenham Town (from August 1950), Yeovil Town (1951/52; 28 compulsory games/8 goals), Tonbridge FC, Kidderminster Harriers (from August 1953) and Rugby Town (from September 1954). In February 1970, he took over as coach of the Sunday League team Lion Rangers.
