= Justice Griffith =

Justice Griffith may refer to:

- Lynn B. Griffith (1886–1978), associate justice of the Ohio Supreme Court
- Robert Frederick Griffith (1911–1993), associate justice of the New Hampshire Supreme Court
- Samuel Griffith (1845–1920), chief justice of the High Court of Australia

== See also ==
- Thomas Griffitts (1698–1746), associate justice of the Supreme Court of Pennsylvania
