= Estyn Griffiths =

Welsh footballer

Personal information
- Full name: Estyn Griffiths
- Date of birth: 22 July 1927
- Place of birth: Pontblyddyn, Wales
- Date of death: 1 April 2017 (aged 89)
- Place of death: Wrexham, Wales
- Position: Centre half

Senior career*
Years	Team	Apps	(Gls)
–1950	Llay Welfare		
1950–1952	Wrexham	10	(0)
1952–1955	Chelmsford City	75	(0)

International career
1950	Wales Amateurs	2	(0)
- * Club domestic league appearances and goals

Estyn Griffiths (22 July 1927 – 1 April 2017) was a Welsh amateur footballer who played as a centre half in the Football League for Wrexham. He was capped by Wales at amateur level.

== Career statistics ==
Appearances and goals by club, season and competition
Club	Season	League			National cup		Total	
Club	Season	Division	Apps	Goals	Apps	Goals	Apps	Goals
Wrexham	1950–51	Third Division North	6	0	0	0	6	0
Wrexham	1951–52	Third Division North	4	0	0	0	4	0
Career total			10	0	0	0	10	0

== Honours ==
Llay Welfare

- Welsh Amateur Cup: 1948–49
