= Stephen Griffiths =

Stephen, Steven or Steve Griffiths may refer to:

- Stephen Shaun Griffiths (born 1969), convicted of the Bradford murders in 2010
- Steve Griffiths (footballer) (1914–1998), English footballer
- Steve Griffiths (athlete) (born 1964), Jamaican sprinter
- Steve Griffiths (rugby union) (born 1973), English-born Scotland rugby union player
- Steven Griffiths (born 1962), Australian politician
- Steven Griffiths (cricketer) (born 1973), English cricketer
