= Bill Parry (footballer, born 1914) =

English footballer (1914–1964)

Personal information
- Full name: William Parry
- Date of birth: 20 October 1914
- Place of birth: Denaby Main, England
- Date of death: 22 December 1964 (aged 50)
- Place of death: Chelmsford, England
- Height: 5 ft 9 in (1.75 m)
- Position: Left-half

Senior career*
Years	Team	Apps	(Gls)
1933–1936	Mexborough Athletic		
1936–1937	Denaby United		
1937	Frickley Colliery		
1937–1939	Leeds United	6	(0)
1939–1948	Chelmsford City		(0)
1940–1941	→ Southend United (guest)	32	(0)
1944–1945	→ Clapton Orient (guest)	32	(2)
1949–1951	Halstead Town	75	(0)
1953	Chelmsford City	1	(0)
- * Club domestic league appearances and goals

William Parry (20 October 1914 – 22 December 1964) was an English footballer who played as a left half-back. He played in the Football League for Leeds United, and spent many years in non-league football either side of the Second World War.

== Life and career ==
Parry was born in Denaby Main, West Riding of Yorkshire, in 1914. (Note: Some sources give birth year of 1917, possibly based on ages mentioned in newspaper reports. However, no birth was registered under that name in the West Riding in 1917, and Parry supplied the 1939 Register with his date of birth as 20 October 1914.) He was on the books of Midland League club Mexborough Athletic in the 1933–34 season, and in the next, he was a member of the team that lost only once at home from November 1934 to the end of the campaign. He was retained for 1935–36, but Mexborough finished bottom of the Midland League and withdrew from it. Parry became one of several former Mexborough players to sign for nearby Denaby United. He enjoyed what the South Yorkshire Times described as an "outstanding" season, and then moved on to another Midland League club, Frickley Colliery, who could reportedly outbid even Third Division teams because they could offer paid work at the colliery in addition to football wages. His stay was short: on 28 October 1937, Parry signed for First Division club Leeds United. He made his debut in a 1–1 draw with Chelsea on 26 December 1938, and made five more league appearances and two in the FA Cup in what remained of that season.

Transfer-listed because Leeds had "so many excellent half-backs", Parry was a target for Third Division Reading, but in June 1939, he left the Football League and signed for Southern League club Chelmsford City. His career was soon interrupted by World War II: he remained with Chelmsford until the end of the season, playing regularly as they won the Eastern Section of the 1939–40 Southern League and drew the play-off with Lovell's Athletic, winners of the Western Section. Parry married Hilda Boosey in May 1940. After his club closed down for the duration, he kept up his football by guesting for Southend United and Clapton Orient, making 32 appearances for each club. He also played for the team of Christy and Norris, manufacturers of pulverisers and similar machinery, for which he was employed in war work.

By then playing as a full back, Parry captained the team and missed only one match as Chelmsford won the League–League Cup "double" in the first post-war edition of the Southern League. He took his first-team appearance totals to 101, and was retained for the 1948–49 season, during which he was awarded a benefit. After attending a Football Association coaching course, he began coaching Chelmsford's reserve side. In 1949, he joined Halstead Town as player-coach, making 75 appearances over the course of two seasons.

He returned to Chelmsford City as reserve team trainer in 1951, and took over the same role with the first team. It was while working as trainer that he made a solitary appearance in a 7–1 loss away to Merthyr Tydfil on 31 January 1953, making up the numbers when player Fred Newby missed the train to Wales for the game. He retired due to ill-health in 1962, and died in 1964 in hospital in Chelmsford at the age of 50.
