= Alec Farmer =

Scottish footballer

Personal information
- Full name: Alexander Farmer
- Date of birth: 9 October 1908
- Place of birth: Lochgelly, Scotland
- Date of death: 1986 (aged 77–78)
- Height: 5 ft 10 1/2 in (1.79 m)
- Positions: Half back; inside forward

Senior career*
| Years | Team | Apps | (Gls) |
- Kettering Town
| 1930–1931 | Nottingham Forest | 16 | (0) |
| 1931 | Leicester City | 0 | (0) |
- Yeovil & Petters United
| 1933–1939 | Queens Park Rangers | 79 | (10) |
- * Club domestic league appearances and goals

Alexander Farmer (9 October 1908 – 1986) was a Scottish professional footballer, best remembered for his time as a half back and inside forward in the Football League with Queens Park Rangers and Nottingham Forest.

== Career statistics ==
Appearances and goals by club, season and competition
| Club | Season | League | | | FA Cup | | Other | | Total | |
| Club | Season | Division | Apps | Goals | Apps | Goals | Apps | Goals | Apps | Goals |
|---|---|---|---|---|---|---|---|---|---|---|
| Nottingham Forest | 1930–31 | Second Division | 15 | 0 | 0 | 0 | — | | 15 | 0 |
| Nottingham Forest | 1931–32 | Second Division | 1 | 0 | 0 | 0 | — | | 1 | 0 |
| Nottingham Forest | Total | | 16 | 0 | 0 | 0 | — | | 16 | 0 |
| Queens Park Rangers | 1933–34 | Third Division South | 12 | 0 | — | | — | | 12 | 0 |
| Queens Park Rangers | 1934–35 | Third Division South | 26 | 7 | 1 | 0 | 4 (Note: Appearance(s) in Third Division South Cup) | 0 | 31 | 7 |
| Queens Park Rangers | 1935–36 | Third Division South | 9 | 3 | 0 | 0 | 1 | 0 | 10 | 3 |
| Queens Park Rangers | 1936–37 | Third Division South | 25 | 0 | 2 | 0 | 0 | 0 | 27 | 0 |
| Queens Park Rangers | 1937–38 | Third Division South | 7 | 0 | 0 | 0 | 1 | 0 | 8 | 0 |
| Queens Park Rangers | 1938–39 | Third Division South | 0 | 0 | 0 | 0 | 1 | 0 | 0 | 0 |
| Queens Park Rangers | Total | | 79 | 10 | 3 | 0 | 7 | 0 | 89 | 10 |
| Career total | | | 95 | 10 | 3 | 0 | 7 | 0 | 105 | 10 |
