= Johnny Hartburn =

English footballer (1920–2001)

Personal information
- Full name: John Hartburn
- Date of birth: 20 December 1920
- Place of birth: Houghton-le-Spring, England
- Date of death: 22 January 2001 (aged 80)
- Place of death: Bournemouth, England
- Position: Left wing

Senior career*
| Years | Team | Apps | (Gls) |
| | Yeovil Town | ? | (?) |
| 1947–1949 | Queens Park Rangers | 58 | (11) |
| 1949–1951 | Watford | 66 | (19) |
| 1951–1954 | Millwall | 104 | (29) |
| 1954–1958 | Leyton Orient | 112 | (36) |
| 1958–1959 | Yiewsley | ? | (?) |
| 1959–? | Guildford City | ? | (?) |
| Total | | 340 | (95) |
- * Club domestic league appearances and goals

John Hartburn (20 December 1920 – 22 January 2001) was an English footballer who played as a left winger in the Football League. Queen's Park Rangers paid a transfer fee of £2,000 in March 1947 when they signed Hartburn from Yeovil and Petters United - only five months after Hartburn turned professional.
