= Alex Lennon =

Scottish footballer (1925–1992)

Personal information
- Full name: Alexander Vincent Lennon
- Date of birth: 25 October 1925
- Place of birth: Glasgow, Scotland
- Date of death: October 1992 (aged 66–67)
- Place of death: Stevenage, England
- Position: Inside forward

Senior career*
Years	Team	Apps	(Gls)
1945–1946	Rotherham United	0	(0)
1947–1948	Queens Park Rangers	1	(0)
1948–1949	Mansfield Town	3	(0)
Total		4	(0)
- * Club domestic league appearances and goals

Alexander Vincent Lennon (25 October 1925 – October 1992) was a Scottish professional footballer who played in the Football League for Mansfield Town and Queens Park Rangers.
