= Stan Armitage =

English footballer

Personal information
- Full name: Stanley Albert Armitage
- Date of birth: 5 June 1919
- Place of birth: Woolwich, England
- Date of death: 4 November 1997 (aged 78)
- Place of death: Greenwich, England
- Position: Forward

Senior career*
Years	Team	Apps	(Gls)
1946–1947	Queens Park Rangers	2	(0)
- Gravesend & Northfleet
- * Club domestic league appearances and goals

Stanley Albert Armitage (5 June 1919 – 4 November 1997) was an English footballer who played in the Football League for Queens Park Rangers.
