= Bob Griffiths (footballer, born 1903) =

Scottish footballer (1908–1980)

Personal information
- Full name: Robert Hamilton Griffiths
- Date of birth: 9 November 1908
- Place of birth: Chapleton, Scotland
- Date of death: 1980 (aged 71)
- Place of death: England
- Height: 1.75 m (5 ft 9 in)
- Position: Defender

Senior career*
Years	Team	Apps	(Gls)
- Pollok
1931–1941	Chelsea	42	(0)
- * Club domestic league appearances and goals

Robert Griffiths (9 November 1908 – 1980) was a Scottish professional footballer who played as a defender.

== Club career ==
Griffiths signed for Chelsea in 1931 from Pollok in his native Scotland. He spent ten years with Chelsea, often playing as captain. He joined the Wartime Police Reserve during the Second World War, but remained registered to Chelsea.
