= Walter Griffiths (footballer) =

English footballer

Personal information
- Full name: Walter Harold Griffiths
- Date of birth: 13 June 1884
- Place of birth: Radford, England
- Date of death: 1966 (aged 81–82)
- Position: Inside forward

Senior career*
Years	Team	Apps	(Gls)
1906–1907	Ilkeston United		
1907–1909	Barnsley	17	(3)
Total		17	(3)
- * Club domestic league appearances and goals

Walter Harold Griffiths (13 June 1884–1966) was an English footballer who played in the Football League for Barnsley.
