= Frank McGinn (footballer) =

Scottish footballer (1919–1995)

Personal information
- Date of birth: 2 March 1919
- Place of birth: Cambuslang, Scotland
- Date of death: 1995 (aged 75–76)
- Place of death: Toronto, Ontario, Canada
- Position: Winger

Senior career*
| Years | Team | Apps | (Gls) |
- Forth Wanderers
| 1946–1947 | Wrexham | 2 | (0) |
| 1947–1949 | Ipswich Town | 8 | (2) |
| 1949–1950 | Cowdenbeath | 1 | (1) |
- * Club domestic league appearances and goals

Francis McGinn (2 March 1919 – December 1995) was a Scottish footballer who played as a winger. He played in the English football league for Wrexham and Ipswich Town.
