= John Barr (footballer, born 1917) =

Scottish footballer (1917–1997)

Personal information
- Full name: John Millar Barr
- Date of birth: 9 September 1917
- Place of birth: Bridge of Weir, Scotland
- Date of death: 27 March 1997 (aged 79)
- Place of death: Paisley, Scotland
- Position: Centre back

Youth career
- Strathclyde

Senior career*
Years	Team	Apps	(Gls)
1937–1939	Third Lanark	27	(0)
1946–1947	Queens Park Rangers	4	(0)
1947	Dunfermline Athletic	1	(0)
1947	Dundee United	1	(0)
- * Club domestic league appearances and goals

John Millar Barr (9 September 1917 – 27 March 1997) was a Scottish footballer, who played as a centre back. Barr, born in Bridge of Weir, Renfrewshire, began his career in the late 1930s with Third Lanark. Spending two years at Cathkin Park, Barr then signed for QPR on 24 May 1939. Barr's career was – like many players – interrupted by the onset of the Second World War, and he missed several years, primarily due to being held prisoner in Germany for four years. Returning in the 1946–47 season with Queens Park Rangers, Barr was released in the summer of 1947. He returned to Scotland and worked as a tanner in the leather industry. He featured twice, playing a game apiece the following season for both Dunfermline Athletic and Dundee United. Although the progression of his playing career after leaving Tannadice is unknown, Barr returned to Loftus Road as a scout for QPR under manager Jack Taylor . In 1959 Taylor moved to Leeds United and Barr followed. After Taylor left Leeds Barr remained with new manager Don Revie's Leeds United in 1961. During his time at Elland Road, Barr was responsible for finding a great many Scottish players, with many becoming full internationals. Barr maintained his association with Leeds until his death in 1997.
