= Reg Allen =

English footballer

Personal information
- Full name: Arthur Reginald Allen
- Date of birth: 3 May 1919
- Place of birth: Marylebone, England
- Date of death: 3 April 1976 (aged 56)
- Place of death: Ealing, England
- Height: 1.83 m (6 ft 0 in)
- Position: Goalkeeper

Senior career*
Years	Team	Apps	(Gls)
1938–1950	Queens Park Rangers	183	(0)
1950–1955	Manchester United	75	(0)
- * Club domestic league appearances and goals

Arthur Reginald Allen (3 May 1919 – 3 April 1976) was an English footballer who played as a goalkeeper for Queens Park Rangers and Manchester United in the 1930s, 1940s and 1950s.

== Career ==
Allen made his QPR first team debut in an FA Cup tie at Crystal Palace on 26 November 1938. His league debut against Newport County took place a week later on 3 December 1938. Allen was known as one of the best goalkeepers of his era. He initially played for the Corona Football Club in the Hanwell and District League where a QPR supporter spotted him and recommended him to the club. He was given a trial with the reserve team at Clacton and the side lost 2–1. Allen felt he had played poorly. The club though felt he had promise but it was several months before he could be persuaded to play again. His next match was again with the reserves at West Ham on 12 March 1938. West Ham won 7–1. Despite this it was still felt that Allen had done well and on 6 May 1938 he signed professional terms.

Allen went on to play 183 league games for QPR, his career impacted by the war years where he was a prisoner of war (POW) in North Africa after being captured while on a commando raid in July 1941. While in German hands, Allen played in many six-a-side games, typically as centre-forward to help gain a different insight to the game. He was a member of the 1948 QPR team that won the Third Division (South) championship.

Allen was transferred to Manchester United in June 1950 for £11,000, a then world-record fee for a goalkeeper. With his signing, Jack Crompton, then the first-choice keeper at United, was reduced to a back-up role. Allen played his last game for Manchester United on 4 October 1952, at Wolverhampton Wanderers. With the score at 2.2 at halftime, Allen didn't come out for the half and 10 player United lost 6.2. Manager Matt Busby stated after the match that Allen had pneumonia. Allen didn't play again and his contract was ended in June 1953. Crompton managed to reclaim the number 1 jersey, along with promising, young 'keeper Ray Wood.

A benefit game for Allen took place between QPR and Manchester United on 29 March 1954, raising in the region of £1,800 for his recovery fund.

He died on 3 April 1976, one month before what would have been his 57th birthday.

== Honours ==
=== Club ===
Queens Park Rangers

- Third Division (South): 1947–48

Manchester United

- First Division: 1951–52
