= Harry Daniels (footballer) =

English footballer

Personal information
- Full name: Harry Augustus George Daniels
- Date of birth: 25 June 1920
- Place of birth: Kensington, London, England
- Date of death: 2002 (aged 79–80)
- Height: 5 ft 9 in (1.75 m)
- Position: Half-back

Senior career*
Years	Team	Apps	(Gls)
- Kensington Sports
1944–1948	Queens Park Rangers	14	(0)
1948–1950	Brighton & Hove Albion	32	(0)
1950	York City	4	(2)
1950–1951	Dover		
Total		50+	(2+)
- * Club domestic league appearances and goals

Harry Augustus George Daniels (25 June 1920 – 2002) was an English professional footballer who played as a half-back in the Football League for Queens Park Rangers, Brighton & Hove Albion and York City, and in non-League football for Kensington Sports and Dover.
