= Reg Swinfen =

English footballer

Personal information
- Full name: Reginald Swinfen
- Date of birth: 4 May 1915
- Place of birth: Battersea, England
- Date of death: October 1996 (aged 81)
- Place of death: Crawley, England
- Height: 5 ft 11 in (1.80 m)
- Position: Outside right

Youth career
- –: Coventry City

Senior career*
Years	Team	Apps	(Gls)
19??–1936	Civil Service		
1936–1947	Queens Park Rangers	26	(5)
1947–1949	Yeovil Town		(18)
1949–195?	Tonbridge		
–	Crawley Town		
- * Club domestic league appearances and goals

Reginald Swinfen (4 May 1915 – October 1996) was an English footballer who played as a forward or full back in the Football League for Queens Park Rangers either side of the Second World War.

== Life and career ==
Swinfen was born in Battersea, London, in 1915. He worked as a postman, and by 1933 was playing football for the Civil Service club. From there he joined Queens Park Rangers (QPR) of the Third Division South, initially as an amateur centre forward with considerable pace. He turned professional in March 1936, and made his first-team debut the following September, playing at inside right in a 2–1 win at home to Clapton Orient. He first scored during his fifth of seven appearances that season; playing at centre forward, he contributed a hat-trick in a 7–0 defeat of Newport County Swinfen played three first-team matches in 1937–38, all at right half, before making 18 appearances at right back in the first half of the 1938–39 season.

During the war, Swinfen served in the Royal Air Force and in the British Army of the Rhine. When available, he played wartime football for QPR. He made his final appearance in the Football League playing at left back in a 2–0 defeat at home to Bristol Rovers.

In June 1947, Swinfen became Yeovil Town's record signing, for a fee reported as "in the region of £500"; the Western Morning News described him as "well-known as an amateur sprinter." He was the club's top scorer in the 1947–48 season, with 18 goals in Southern League competition, and moved in to another Southern League club, Tonbridge, in January 1949. He remained a Tonbridge player until at least 1951, and went on to play for other non-league clubs including Crawley Town.

Swinfen died in Crawley in October 1996 at the age of 81.
