= Alf Ridyard =

English footballer

Alfred Ridyard (5 March 1908 – 1981) was an English professional footballer, active between 1930 and 1947.

Ridyard was originally from Cudworth, South Yorkshire. He started his footballing career for Barnsley as a Centre Half between 1930 and 1931. He then moved to West Bromwich Albion where he stayed until 1936. In 1937 he joined Queen's Park Rangers where he rose to become team captain. In the 1939–1940 season he played for Tunbridge Wells Rangers F.C. probably as a guest player. He remained with Queen's Park Rangers until ten years later when he finished his playing career in 1947.

In World War II he worked with the Metropolitan Police, 6 months CID, and also played for Queen's Park Rangers and West Ham United in wartime games. In the twilight of his playing career in 1947 Ridyard made a dramatic comeback at the age of 40 and captained Rangers in the vital last games to win promotion to Division 2, which at the time was the equivalent to the Championship.

He continued to be involved with the club for many years after he stopped playing including roles as Chief Scout and Assistant Manager to Jack Taylor.

Ridyard died in 1981 in Sandwell.
