= Billy McEwan (footballer, born 1914) =

Scottish footballer

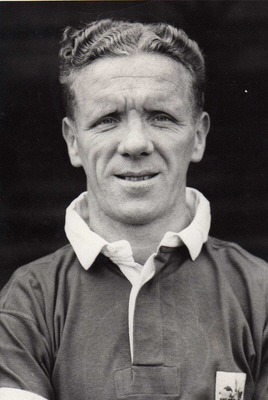

Personal information
- Full name: William McEwan
- Date of birth: 29 August 1914
- Place of birth: Glasgow, Scotland
- Date of death: 1991 (aged 76–77)
- Place of death: Gravesend, Kent, England
- Position: Winger

Senior career*
Years	Team	Apps	(Gls)
	Petershill	?	(?)
1938–1949	QPR	96	(17)
1949–1950	Leyton Orient	21	(3)
	Gravesend & Northfleet	?	(?)
- * Club domestic league appearances and goals

William McEwan (29 August 1914 – 1991) was a Scottish footballer. As an amateur he played for Petershill of Glasgow. He was signed by QPR on 5 May 1939 on a two-year contract. He was a member of the 1948 QPR team that won the Third Division (South) championship and reached the Quarter finals of the FA Cup. He transferred to Third Division South Club Leyton Orient in February 1950 and later played for Gravesend & Northfleet of the Southern League.

== Career statistics ==
Club appearances and goals by season by competition
Club	Season	League			FA Cup		Total	
Club		Division	Apps	Goals	Apps	Goals	Apps	Goals
Petershill	1937							
Queens Park Rangers	1946/47	Third Division South	35	8	6	1	41	9
Queens Park Rangers	1947/48	Third Division South	25	6	5	2	30	8
Queens Park Rangers	1948/49	Second Division	15				15	
Queens Park Rangers	1949/50	Second Division	9	1	1		10	1
Leyton Orient	1949/50	Third Division South	21	3			21	3
	1950/51	Third Division South	21	3			21	3
Total			105	18	12	3	117	21
