= 1975–76 Queens Park Rangers F.C. season =

English football club season

Queens Park Rangers
1975–76 season
- Chairman: Jim Gregory
- Manager: Dave Sexton
- Stadium: Loftus Road
- First Division: 2nd
- FA Cup: Third round
- League Cup: Fourth round
- Top goalscorer: League: Don Givens (13); All: Don Givens (13)
- Highest home attendance: 31,002 v Leeds United (24 April 1976)
- Lowest home attendance: 16,759 v Birmingham City (17 January 1976)
- Average home league attendance: 23,850
- Biggest win: 5-0 Vs Everton (11 October 1975)
- Biggest defeat: 1-3 Vs Newcastle (11 November 1975)
Home colours	Away colours

These are the results of the 1975–76 season for Queens Park Rangers F.C. when they competed in the English Football League First Division. Rangers enjoyed the best season in their history, finishing second in the First Division, a point behind champions Liverpool.

== Season summary ==
Following promotion to the First Division in 1973, the Rangers had spent two years gradually building up their squad under the stewardship of former Chelsea manager Dave Sexton.

Rangers began the season in superb style by beating Liverpool 2–0 at Loftus Road, with the opening goal by Gerry Francis epitomising the free-flowing football the team would play throughout the season - a pass from Frank McLintock to Stan Bowles, a deft flick through the legs to Francis, a one-two with Don Givens and a low shot despatched past goalkeeper Ray Clemence. BBC Match of the Day viewers would later vote it their 'Goal of the Season.' The following weekend, Rangers produced an even more impressive result by beating reigning champions Derby County 5–1 at the Baseball Ground, Bowles scoring a hat-trick, and four matches later a goal by David Webb ended Manchester United's unbeaten start. Indeed, it was not until their eleventh match that Rangers themselves lost for the first time, going down 2–1 at Leeds United, although they bounced back in their next match by thrashing Everton 5–0.

Four defeats in six matches straddling the New Year saw Rangers slip from top of the table to fifth, but a 2–0 win at Aston Villa in late January set in motion an extraordinary run of 11 wins and a draw that pushed them right back into contention for the League title. By the second weekend in April they were once again top of the table, a point ahead of Liverpool with three matches to play. Crucially, Rangers lost their next match 3–2 at Norwich City on 17 April, allowing Liverpool to reclaim the advantage by beating Stoke City. Both teams then won their penultimate fixtures, and after beating Leeds 2–0 on the final Saturday of the season, 24 April, Rangers were left with an agonising wait as Liverpool did not complete their fixtures until 10 days later on 4 May, at relegation-threatened Wolverhampton Wanderers. Liverpool's superior goal average meant they needed just a draw to become champions, but when Steve Kindon fired the home side into a first-half lead after 15 minutes, Rangers' dream was very much alive. The score remained 1–0 until the final quarter of an hour, but Kevin Keegan scored a dramatic equaliser and two further Liverpool goals handed them the title by a margin of just one point.

This season marked the first year of European football qualification in the club's history.

== Kit ==
QPR's kit were manufactured by Umbro

== League Table ==
Pos	Team	Pld	W	D	L	GF	GA	GAv	Pts	Qualification or relegation
1	Liverpool (C)	42	23	14	5	66	31	2.129	60	Qualification for the European Cup first round
2	Queens Park Rangers	42	24	11	7	67	33	2.030	59	Qualification for the UEFA Cup first round
3	Manchester United	42	23	10	9	68	42	1.619	56	Qualification for the UEFA Cup first round
4	Derby County	42	21	11	10	75	58	1.293	53	Qualification for the UEFA Cup first round
5	Leeds United	42	21	9	12	65	46	1.413	51	

Source: World Football
Rules for classification: 1) Points; 2) Goal average; 3) Goals scored
(C) Champions

== Results ==
QPR scores given first

Win Draw Loss

=== First Division ===
Date	Opponents	Venue	Result F–A	Scorers	Attendance	Position
16 August 1975	Liverpool	H	2–0	Francis 44', Leach 72'	27,113	4
19 August 1975	Aston Villa	H	1–1	Francis 59'	21,986	3
23 August 1975	Derby County	A	5–1	Thomas, Bowles 3 (1 pen), Clement	27,590	3
26 August 1975	Wolverhampton Wanderers	A	2–2	Givens 9', 31'	19,380	3
30 August 1975	West Ham United	H	1–1	Givens	28,408	3
6 September 1975	Birmingham City	A	1–1	Thomas	27,305	4
13 September 1975	Manchester United	H	1–0	Webb 3'	29,237	3
20 September 1975	Middlesbrough	A	0–0		24,867	3
23 September 1975	Leicester City	H	1–0	Leach 57'	19,292	2
27 September 1975	Newcastle United	H	1–0	Leach 39'	22,981	1
4 October 1975	Leeds United	A	1–2	Bowles (pen)	30,943	2
11 October 1975	Everton	H	5–0	Givens 1', Masson 30', Francis 63', 82', Thomas 68'	23,022	1
18 October 1975	Burnley	A	0–1		20,409	2
25 October 1975	Sheffield United	H	1–0	Givens	21,161	1
1 November 1975	Coventry City	A	1–1	Givens	17,845	3
8 November 1975	Tottenham Hotspur	H	0–0		28,454	3
15 November 1975	Ipswich Town	A	1–1	Givens	25,540	4
22 November 1975	Burnley	H	1–0	Bowles	17,390	2
29 November 1975	Stoke City	H	3–2	Masson, Clement, Webb	22,328	2
6 December 1975	Manchester City	A	0–0		36,066	1
13 December 1975	Derby County	H	1–1	Nutt	25,465	1
20 December 1975	Liverpool	A	0–2		39,182	4
26 December 1975	Norwich City	H	2–0	Masson, Bowles	21,774	3
27 December 1975	Arsenal	A	0–2		39,021	5
10 January 1976	Manchester United	A	1–2	Givens 10'	58,312	5
17 January 1976	Birmingham City	H	2–1	Masson 2	16,759	5
24 January 1976	West Ham United	A	0–1		26,677	5
31 January 1976	Aston Villa	A	2–0	Hollins 76', Francis 89'	32,223	5
7 February 1976	Wolverhampton Wanderers	H	4–2	Givens 13', 63', Thomas 21', Francis 49' (pen)	17,153	3
14 February 1976	Tottenham Hotspur	A	3–0	Givens, Francis 2	28,200	3
21 February 1976	Ipswich Town	H	3–1	Wark (og), Webb, Thomas	22,593	2
25 February 1976	Leicester City	A	1–0	Thomas	24,340	2
28 February 1976	Sheffield United	A	0–0		21,949	2
6 March 1976	Coventry City	H	4–1	Thomas, Francis, Givens, Masson	19,731	1
13 March 1976	Everton	A	2–0	Bowles 29', Leach 80'	25,186	1
20 March 1976	Stoke City	A	1–0	Webb	22,848	1
27 March 1976	Manchester City	H	1–0	Webb 81'	29,883	1
3 April 1976	Newcastle United	A	2–1	McLintock 20', Bowles 90'	30,134	1
10 April 1976	Middlesbrough	H	4–2	Francis 59' (pen), 80',Givens 65''Bowles 86'	24,342	1
17 April 1976	Norwich City	A	2–3	Thomas, Powell (og)	31,231	2
19 April 1976	Arsenal	H	2–1	McLintock, Francis (pen)	30,362	2
24 April 1976	Leeds United	H	2–0	Thomas 62', Bowles 82	31,002	2

=== Football League Cup ===
Date	Round	Opponents	H / A	Result F–A	Scorers	Attendance
9 September 1975	Second Round	Shrewsbury Town (Third Division)	A	4–1	Webb 50', Masson , Thomas 82', Leach 87'	11,250
7 October 1975	Third Round	Charlton Athletic (Second Division)	H	1–1	Bowles	20,434
13 October 1975	Third Round Replay	Charlton Athletic (Second Division)	A	3–0	Thomas, Masson, Bowles	31,583
11 November 1975	Fourth Round	Newcastle United (First Division)	H	1–3	Leach 9'	21,162

=== FA Cup ===
Date	Round	Opponents	H / A	Result F–A	Scorers	Attendance
3 January 1976	Third Round	Newcastle United (First Division)	H	0–0		20,102
7 January 1976	Third Round Replay	Newcastle United (First Division)	A	1–2	Masson 60'	37,225

=== Friendlies ===
Date	Location	Opponents	H / A	Result F–A	Scorers	Attendance
20 July 1975	West Germany	Borussia Mönchengladbach	A	4-1	Bowles 29', ?, Webb 2	7,500
25 July 1975	West Germany	Wuppertal FC	A			
27 July 1975	West Germany	Paderborn FC	A			
8 August 1975	Athletic Bilbao Tournament Spain	Benfica	N			
9 August 1975	Athletic Bilbao Tournament Spain	Althletic Bilbao	A			
1 October 1975	Jimmy Wallbanks Testimonial	Reading	A			
2 February 1976	Mike Leach Testimonial	Red Star Belgrade	H			
2 March 1976		Moscow Dynamo	H			
10 March 1976	Ian Morgan Testimonial	Watford	A			
3 May 1976	Mike Channon Testimonial	Southampton	A			

== Squad ==
Position	Nationality	Name	League Appearances	League Goals	Cup Appearances	F.A.Cup Goals	League.Cup Goals	Total Appearances	Total Goals
GK	(England)	Phil Parkes	42		6			48	
GK	(England)	Derek Richardson							
GK	(England)	Richard Teale							
DF	(England)	Ron Abbott	5 (1)		1			7	
DF	(England)	Dave Clement	40	2	6			46	2
DF	(England)	Tommy Cunningham							
DF	(England)	Ian Gillard	41		5			46	
DF	(England)	Danny Westwood							
DF	(Scotland)	Frank McLintock	34 (1)	2	6			41	2
DF	(England)	Don Shanks	2					2	
DF	(England)	David Webb	38	5	6		1	44	6
DF	(England)	Steve Jones							
DF	(England)	Tony Tagg	4					4	
DF	(Scotland)	Keith Pritchett							
MF	(England)	John Beck	3		2			5	
MF	(England)	Martyn Busby			1			1	
MF	(England)	Gerry Francis	36	12	6			42	12
MF	(England)	Mick Leach	29(3)	4	6		2	38	6
MF	(Scotland)	Don Masson	42	6	6	1	2	48	9
MF	(England)	John Hollins	27(5)	1	1			33	1
FW	(England)	Stan Bowles	37	10	6		2	43	12
FW	(England)	Don Rogers							
FW	(Republic of Ireland)	Don Givens	41	13	6			47	13
FW	(England)	Dave Thomas	41	9	5		2	46	11
FW	(England)	Peter Eastoe							
FW	(England)	Phil Nutt	(3)	1				3	1
FW	(England)	Steve Adams							

== Transfers Out ==
Name	from	Date	Fee	Date	Club	Fee
Danny Westwood	Billericay Town	July 1974		November 1975	Gillingham	£17,500
Don Rogers	Crystal Palace	18 September 1974	Ian Evans & Terry Venables	March 1976	Swindon	Plus £100,000 for Peter Eastoe
Richard Teale	Slough Town	July 1973		June 1976	Fulham	
John Beck	Queens Park Rangers Juniors	May 1972		June 1976	Coventry City	£40,000

== Transfers In ==
Name	from	Date	Fee
Steve Adams	Queens Park Rangers Juniors	July 1975	
Phil Nutt	Queens Park Rangers Juniors	1 July 1975	
John Hollins	Chelsea	10 July 1975	£85,000
Steve Jones	Queens Park Rangers Juniors	25 July 1975	
Tony Martin	Queens Park Rangers Juniors	12 September 1975	
Peter Eastoe	Swindon	11 March 1976	Don Rogers & £100,000
Derek Richardson	Chelsea	29 April 1976	Free
