= 1977–78 Queens Park Rangers F.C. season =

English football club season

Queens Park Rangers
1977–78 season
- Chairman: Jim Gregory
- Manager: Frank Sibley
- Stadium: Loftus Road
- Football League First Division: 19th
- FA Cup: Third round
- Football League Cup: Fourth round
- Top goalscorer: League: Stan Bowles Peter Eastoe (6); All: Stan Bowles (9)
- Highest home attendance: 26,267 v Chelsea (24 September 1977)
- Lowest home attendance: 12,925 v Middlesbrough (1 April 1978)
- Average home league attendance: 16, 287
- Biggest win: 6–1 Vs West Ham United (7 January 1978)
- Biggest defeat: 1–5 Vs Everton (8 October 1977)
Home colours	Away colours	Third colours

During the 1977–78 English football season, Queens Park Rangers competed in the First Division

== Season summary ==
QPR struggled all season but just survived relegation under manager Frank Sibley. In other competitions there were early exits in the League Cup and a three game fifth round tie versus Nottingham Forest

== Kit ==
Adidas remained QPR's kit manufacturers.

== League Table ==
Pos	Team	Pld	W	D	L	GF	GA	GD	Pts	Qualification or relegation
17	Bristol City	42	11	13	18	49	53	−4	35	
18	Ipswich Town	42	11	13	18	47	61	−14	35	Qualification for the European Cup Winners' Cup first round (Note: Ipswich Town qualified for the European Cup Winners' Cup as the 1977–78 FA Cup winners.)
19	Queens Park Rangers	42	9	15	18	47	64	−17	33	
20	West Ham United (R)	42	12	8	22	52	69	−17	32	Relegation to the Second Division
21	Newcastle United (R)	42	6	10	26	42	78	−36	22	Relegation to the Second Division

Source: World Football
Rules for classification: 1) Points; 2) Goal difference; 3) Goals scored
(R) Relegated

== Results ==
QPR scores given first

Win Draw Loss

=== First Division ===
Date	Opponents	Venue	Result F–A	Scorers	Attendance	Position
20 August 1977	Aston Villa	H	1–2	Eastoe 88'	25,431	16
23 August 1977	Wolverhampton Wanderers	A	0–1		22,278	18
27 August 1977	Norwich City	A	1–1		17.914	19
3 September 1977	Leicester City	H	3–0	Givens, Francis, Needham	14,516	14
10 September 1977	West Ham United	A	2–2	Eastoe, Lock OG	26,922	14
17 September 1977	Manchester City	H	1–1	Francis 35'	24,668	13
24 September 1977	Chelsea	H	1–1	Masson 68'	26,267	14
1 October 1977	Bristol City	A	2–2	Masson, Eastoe	26,041	13
4 October 1977	Birmingham City	H	1–2	Masson	21,304	14
8 October 1977	Everton	H	1–5	Eastoe	20,495	18
15 October 1977	Arsenal	A	0–1		36,172	19
22 October 1977	Nottingham Forest	H	0–2		24,448	19
29 October 1977	West Bromwich Albion	H	2–1	Eastoe, Bowles	18,800	18
5 November 1977	Middlesbrough	A	1–1	Busby	18,215	18
8 November 1977	Liverpool (H)		pp			
12 November 1977	Liverpool	H	2–0	Bowles 27', James 1'	25,625	17
19 November 1977	Coventry City	A	1–4	Givens	20,441	18
26 November 1977	Manchester United	H	2–2	Givens 55', Needham 17'	25,367	19
3 December 1977	Leeds United	A	0–3		26,507	19
10 December 1977	Newcastle United	H	0–1		15,251	19
17 December 1977	Liverpool	A	0–1		38,249	19
26 December 1977	Derby	H	0–0		18,917	20
27 December 1977	Ipswich Town	A	2–3	Bowles, McGee	22,317	20
31 December 1977	Wolverhampton Wanderers	H	1–3	Shanks	16,067	20
2 January 1978	Aston Villa	A	1–1	Smith og 62'	34,750	20
14 January 1978	Norwich City	H	2–1	Eastoe, Cunningham	14,241	20
21 January 1978	Leicester City	A	0–0		16,286	20
4 February 1978	West Ham United (H)		pp			
11 February 1978	Manchester City	A	1–2	Abbot 88'	39,860	20
18 February 1978	Chelsea (A)		pp			
25 February 1978	Bristol City	H	2–2	Busby Bowles 17' (pen)	17,051	20
4 March 1978	Everton	A	3–3	Hollins, Howe, Shanks	33,861	20
11 March 1978	Arsenal (H)		pp			
14 March 1978	West Ham United	H	1–0	Cunningham	20,394	19
18 March 1978	Nottingham Forest (A)		pp			
22 March 1978	West Bromwich Albion	A	0–2		19,536	19
25 March 1978	Ipswich Town	A	3–3	James, McGee 2	33,861	20
27 March 1978	Derby County	A	0–2		20,156	20
1 April 1978	Middlesbrough	H	1–0	Busby	12,925	20
8 April 1978	Manchester United	A	1–3	Bowles 76' (pen)	42,677	20
11 April 1978	Arsenal	H	2–1	Shanks, Bowles	25,683	20
15 April 1978	Coventry City	H	2–1	James, Goddard	17,062	19
18 April 1978	Nottingham Forest	A	0–1		30.300	20
22 April 1978	Newcastle United	A	3–0	Givens, McGee, Hollins	13,000	17
25 April 1978	Birmingham City	H	0–0		16,049	18
29 April 1978	Leeds United	H	0–0		23,993	17
2 May 1978	Chelsea	A	1–3	James 74'	10.950	19

=== Football League Cup ===
Date	Round	Opponents	H / A	Result F–A	Scorers	Attendance
31 August 1977	Second Round	Bournemouth (Fourth Division)	A	2–0	Eastoe, Givens	10,006
26 October 1977	Third Round	Aston Villa (First Division)	A	0–1		34,481

=== FA Cup ===
Date	Round	Opponents	H / A	Result F–A	Scorers	Attendance
7 January 1978	Third Round	Wealdstone (Southern Football League Premier Division)	H	4–0	Givens, James, Bowles, Howe	16,158
28 January 1978	Fourth Round	West Ham United (First Division)	A	1–1	Howe	35,566
7 January 1978	Fourth Round Replay	West Ham United (First Division)	H	6–1	Givens, James, Bowles, Busby 2, Hollins	24,057
18 February 1978	Fifth Round	Nottingham Forest (First Division)	H	1–1	Busby	26,803
27 February 1978	Fifth Round Replay	Nottingham Forest (First Division)	A	1–1	Shanks	40.097
2 March 1978	Fifth Round Second Replay	Nottingham Forest (First Division)	A	1–3	Bowles	33,990

=== Friendlies ===
Date	Location	Opponents	H / A	Result F–A	Scorers	Attendance
23 July 1977	East Germany	Borussia Dortmund (GDR)	A			
24 July 1977	East Germany	DJK Wanheimerort (GDR)	A			
26 July 1977	East Germany	Kaiserslautern (GDR)	A			
30 July 1977	Holland	Go Ahead Eagles (NLD)	A			
6 August 1977		Milton Keynes City	A			
8 August 1977		Southall	A			
10 August 1977	Dave Clement Testimonial	Wimbledon	A			
13 August 1977	Dave Clement Testimonial	Wycombe Wanderers	A			
14 August 1977	Dave Clement Testimonial	Top Ten XI	H			
2 April 1978		Hungerford Town	A			
5 May 1978	Dave Clement Testimonial	Manchester United	H			
8 May 1978	Rob Curtis Testimonial	Charlton Athletic	A			
18 May 1978	Cyprus	Omonoia FC (CYP)	A			
21 May 1978	Greece	AEK Athens (GRC)	A			
22 May 1978	Greece	Aris Salonika (GRC)	A			

== Squad ==
Pos.	Nat.	Name	League Appearances	League Goals	F A Cup Appearances	F A Cup Goals	League Cup Appearances	League Cup Goals	Total Appearances	Total Goals
GK	ENG	Phil Parkes	31		6		2		39	
GK	ENG	Derek Richardson	11						11	
DF	ENG	Don Shanks	36	3	6		1	1	43	4
DF	ENG	Ian Gillard	38		6		2		46	
DF	ENG	Dave Clement	31		4		2		37	
DF	ENG	Ernie Howe	23	1	6			2	29	7
DF	ENG	Steve Perkins	2						2	
DF	ENG	Thomas Cunningham	16	2	2				18	2
MF	ENG	Barry Wallace	13		1				14	
MF	ENG	Brian Williams	19		2		2		23	
MF	ENG	Ron Abbott	10	1	5		1		16	1
MF	ENG	Gerry Francis	13	2			1		14	2
MF	ENG	John Hollins	40	2	6		2	1	48	3
MF	ENG	Martyn Busby	21	3	5			3	26	8
FW	IRE	Paul McGee	17	4	2				19	4
FW	WAL	Leighton James	26	3	5			2	31	5
FW	IRE	Don Givens	37	4	6	1	2	2	45	7
FW	ENG	Paul Goddard	6	1					6	1
FW	ENG	Peter Eastoe	19	6		1	2		21	7
FW	ENG	Mick Leach	7		1				8	
FW	ENG	Stan Bowles	40	6	6		2	3	48	9

== Transfers Out ==
Name	from	Date	Fee	Date	Club	Fee
Steve Adams	Queens Park Rangers Juniors	July 1975		July 1977	Millwall	Free
Nicky Ironton	Queens Park Rangers Juniors	July 1976		July 1977	Barking	Free
Eddie Kelly	Arsenal	September 3, 1976	£50,000	July 1977	Leicester	£50,000
Tony Tagg	Queens Park Rangers Juniors	March 1975		July 1977	Millwall	Free
Phil Nutt	Queens Park Rangers Juniors	July 1975		July 1977	Hounslow Town	
Dave Thomas	Burnley	October 20, 1972	£165,000	August 1977	Everton	£200,000
David Webb	Chelsea	July 11, 1974	£120,000	September 1977	Leicester City	£50,000
Don Masson	Notts County	December 11, 1974	£100,000	October 1977	Derby County	Leighton James
Dave Needham	Notts County	June 8, 1977	£90,000	December 1977	Nottingham	£140,000
Tony Martin	Queens Park Rangers Juniors	September 12, 1975		June 1978	Vauxhall Motors	Free
Brian Williams	Bury	July 14, 1977	£70,000	June 1978	Swindon	£50,000

== Transfers In ==
Name	from	Date	Fee
Paul Goddard	Queens Park Rangers Juniors	July 1977	
Peter Hucker	Queens Park Rangers Juniors	July 1977	
Brian Williams	Bury	July 14, 1977	£70,000
Barry Wallace	Queens Park Rangers Juniors	August 1977	
Martyn Busby	Notts County	September 26, 1977	£80,000
Leighton James	Derby County	October 27, 1977	Don Masson
Paul McGee	Sligo Rovers	November 17, 1977	£15,000
Ernie Howe	Fulham	December 14, 1977	£55,000
Billy Hamilton	Linfield	Apr 30,1978	£25,000
Rachid Harkouk	Crystal Palace	June 28, 1978	£150,000
