= 1976–77 Queens Park Rangers F.C. season =

English football club season

Queens Park Rangers
1976–77 season
- Chairman: Jim Gregory
- Manager: Dave Sexton
- Stadium: Loftus Road
- Football League First Division: 14th
- FA Cup: Fourth round
- League Cup: Semi Finalist
- UEFA Cup: Quarter Finalist
- South East Counties League Cup: Winners
- Southern Junior Floodlit Cup: Winners
- Top goalscorer: League: Don Givens (10); All: Don Givens (19)
- Highest home attendance: 29,832 vs Liverpool (7 May 1977)
- Lowest home attendance: 13,069 vs Bury (21 September 1976)
- Average home league attendance: 21,085
- Biggest win: 4-0 Vs Manchester United (19 April 1977)
- Biggest defeat: 0-4 Vs Everton (21 August 1976)
Home colours	Away colours	Third colours

During the 1976–77 English football season, Queens Park Rangers competed in the First Division

== Season summary ==
In Division 1, QPR struggled to match the previous season's near-championship-winning season. In other competitions there was an early exit in the FA Cup, although the semi-finals of the League Cup were reached, whilst in QPR's first foray into European competition, free-scoring QPR eventually bowed out on penalties in the quarter finals of the Uefa Cup.

== Kit ==
Adidas remained QPR's kit manufacturers.

== Final league table ==
Pos	Team	Pld	W	D	L	GF	GA	GD	Pts
12	Middlesbrough	42	14	13	15	40	45	−5	41
13	Birmingham City	42	13	12	17	63	61	+2	38
14	Queens Park Rangers	42	13	12	17	47	52	−5	38
15	Derby County	42	9	19	14	50	55	−5	37
16	Norwich City	42	14	9	19	47	64	−17	37

Source: World Football
Rules for classification: 1) Points; 2) Goal difference; 3) Goals scored

== Results ==
Queens Park Rangers' score comes first

=== Legend ===
Win	Draw	Loss

=== Football League First Division ===
Date	Opponents	Venue	Result F–A	Scorers	Attendance	Position
21 August 1976	Everton	H	0–4		24,449	21
23 August 1976	West Ham United	A	0–1		31,668	22
28 August 1976	Ipswich Town	A	2–2	Masson, Givens	24,491	21
4 September 1976	West Bromwich Albion	H	1–0	Gillard 2'	18,876	19
11 September 1976	Aston Villa	H	2–1	Masson 35', Clement 56'	23,602	15
18 September 1976	Leicester City	A	2–2	Givens,Hollins	18,439	14
25 September 1976	Stoke City	H	2–0	Bowles 9', Givens 79'	21,621	9
2 October 1976	Arsenal	A	2–3	Thomas, McLintock	39,442	15
5 October 1976	Norwich City	H	2–3	Webb, Masson	16,086	15
16 October 1976	Manchester City	A	0–0	Masson Pen Miss	40,751	15
23 October 1976	Sunderland	H	2–0	Bowles 66', McLintock 29'	22,408	13
30 October 1976	Birmingham City	A	1–2	Eastoe	31,471	15
6 November 1976	Derby County	H	1–1	Givens	22,527	16
9 November 1976	Bristol City	H	pp			
13 November 1976	Coventry City	A	0–2		16,190	16
20 November 1976	Middlesbrough	H	3–0	Givens, Masson, Bowles	16,037	15
27 November 1976	Newcastle United	A	0–2		39,013	16
4 December 1976	Manchester United	H	pp			
11 December 1976	Liverpool	A	1–3	Eastoe 22'	37,154	16
18 December 1976	Leeds United	H	pp			
27 December 1976	Norwich City	A	0–2		27,343	18
29 December 1976	Tottenham Hotspur	H	pp			
1 January 1977	Derby County	A	pp			
11 January 1977	Tottenham Hotspur	H	2–1	Clement,Bowles	24,266	18
15 January 1977	West Ham United	H	pp			
22 January 1977	Everton	A	3–1	Masson, Leach, Bowles	26,875	16
5 February 1977	Ipswich Town	H	pp			
12 February 1977	West Bromwich Albion	A	1–1	Francis	18,364	15
19 February 1977	Aston Villa	A	pp			
26 February 1977	Leicester City	H	3–2	Givens 33',Blockley OG 35', Francis	20,356	16
5 March 1977	Stoke City	A	0–1		15,454	17
8 March 1977	Leeds United	H	0–0		20,386	17
12 March 1977	Arsenal	H	2–1	Hollins, Francis	26,191	15
5 March 1977	Bristol City	A	0–1		22,441	15
22 March 1977	Birmingham City	H	pp			
22 March 1977	Manchester City	H	0–0		17.619	15
2 April 1977	Sunderland	A	0–1		27,550	16
4 April 1977	West Ham United	H	1–1	Eastoe	24,930	16
9 April 1977	Tottenham Hotspur	A	0–3		32,680	18
11 April 1977	Coventry City	H	1–1	Masson	15,445	18
16 April 1977	Middlesbrough	A	2–0	Abbott, Masson	14,500	16
19 April 1977	Manchester United	H	4–0	Eastoe 46' 60', Kelly 22', Givens 1'	28,848	15
23 April 1977	Newcastle United	A	1–2	Givens	20,544	16
26 April 1977	Bristol City	H	0–1		14,576	16
30 April 1977	Manchester United	A	0–1		50,788	18
3 May 1977	Birmingham City	H	pp			
7 May 1977	Liverpool	H	1–1	Givens 10'	29,832	20
11 May 1977	Derby County	A	0–2		21,312	20
14 May 1977	Leeds United	A	1–0	Eastoe	22,226	17
16 May 1977	Ipswich Town	H	1–0	Givens	19,171	16
20 May 1977	Aston Villa	A	1–1	Abbott 52'	28,056	15
23 May 1977	Birmingham City	H	2–2	Webb 74, Masson	14,976	14

=== FA Cup ===
Round	Date	Opponent	Venue	Result F–A	Attendance	Scorers
R3	8 January 1977	Shrewsbury Town (Third Division)	H	2–1	18,285	Bowles 50', Givens
R4	29 January 1977	Manchester United (First Division)	A	0–1	57,422	

=== League Cup ===
Round	Date	Opponent	Venue	Result F–A	Scorers	Attendance
R2	1 September 1976	Cardiff City (Second Division)	A	3–1	Bowles, Thomas, Clement	23,618
R3	21 September 1976	Bury (Third Division)	H	2–1	McLintock, Givens	13,069
R4	27 October 1976	West Ham United (First Division)	A	2–0	Bowles, Clement	24,565
QF	1 December 1976	Arsenal (First Division)	H	2–1	Masson 42, Webb 61'	27,621
SF 1st leg	1 February 1977	Aston Villa (First Division)	H	0–0		28,739
SF 2nd leg	16 February 1977	Aston Villa (First Division)	A	2–2* AET	Francis 79', Eastoe 114'	48,429
SF leg	19 January 1977	Aston Villa (First Division)		pp		
SF 2nd leg	22 February 1977	Aston Villa (First Division)	Highbury	0–3		40,438

=== Uefa Cup ===
Date	Round	Opponents	H / A	Result F–A	Scorers	Attendance
15 September 1976	1st Round 1st leg	Brann Bergen	H	4–0	Masson Bowles 3	14,698
29 September 1976	1st Round 2nd leg	Brann Bergen	A	7–0	Webb 2', Bowles 68',86',88', Givens 37',70', Thomas 81'	11,527
20 October 1976	2nd Round 1st leg	Slovan Bratislava	A	3–3	Bowles 23',?, Givens 29'	40,000*
3 November 1976	2nd Round 2nd leg	Slovan Bratislava	H	5–2	Bowles, Givens 3, Clement	22,001
24 November 1976	3rd Round 1st leg	FC Koln	H	3–0	Bowles 75', Givens, Webb	21,143
8 December 1976	3rd Round 2nd leg	FC Koln	A	1–4 * won on away goals	Masson	50,000*
3 March 1977	QF 1st leg	AEK Athens	H	3–0	Bowles, Francis 2	23,009
16 March 1977	QF 2nd leg	AEK Athens	A	0–3 * lost 6–7 penalties		35,000

=== Friendlies ===
Date	Location	Opponents	H / A	Result F–A	Scorers	Attendance
27 July 1976	West Germany	Rot-Weiss Essen	A			
29 July 1976	West Germany	Preussen Munster	A			
1 August 1976	West Germany	Kaiserslauten	A			
3 August 1976	Yugoslavia	Red Star Belgrade	A			
12 August 1976	Trifeo Ciudad Tournament, Spain	Spartak Moscow	N			
13 August 1976	Trifeo Ciudad Tournament, Spain	Barcelona	N			

== Squad ==
Position	Nationality	Name	League Appearances (Substitutes)	League Goals	Domestic Cup Appearances	League Cup Goals	F.A.Cup Goals	UEFA Cup Appearances	UEFA Cup Goals	Total Appearances	Total Goals
GK	ENG	Phil Parkes	40		9			8		57	
GK	ENG	Derek Richardson	2							2	
DF	SCO	Frank McLintock	36	2	9	1		8		53	3
DF	ENG	Dave Clement	32(1)	2	7	2		6	1	46	5
DF	ENG	Ian Gillard	41	1	9			8		58	1
DF	ENG	David Webb	38	2	9	1		8	2	55	5
DF	ENG	Don Shanks	6(5)		2			1		14	
MF	ENG	Thomas Cunningham	3(2)							5	
MF	ENG	Eddie Kelly	28	1	3			2		33	1
MF	ENG	Ron Abbott	10(2)	2						12	2
MF	ENG	Gerry Francis	11	3	2	1		1	2	14	6
MF	ENG	John Hollins	40	2	8			8		56	2
MF	ENG	Martyn Busby	1					1		2	
FW	ENG	Phil Nutt	(1)							1	
FW	SCO	Don Masson	41	8	9	1		8	2	58	11
FW	IRE	Don Givens	41(1)	10	8	1	1	8	7	58	19
FW	ENG	Dave Thomas	30(1)	1	7	1		7	1	45	3
FW	ENG	Peter Eastoe	24(5)	6	3	1		2		34	7
FW	ENG	Mick Leach	16(7)	1	4			6		33	1
FW	ENG	Stan Bowles	22	5	9	2	1	8	11	39	19

== Transfers Out ==
Name	from	Date	Fee	Date	Club	Fee
Keith Pritchett	Doncaster Rovers	March 1974	Free	July 1976	Brentford	Free
Richard Teale	Walton & Hersham	May 1973		August 1976	Fulham	Free
Trevor Aylott	Chelsea	August 28, 1976	Loan	September 1976	Chelsea	Loan
Martyn Busby	Queens Park Rangers Juniors	July 1970		November 1976	Notts County	£35,000
Frank McLintock	Arsenal	June 4, 1973	£25,000	May 1977	Retired (Leicester manager)	
Keith Furphy	Ipswich	September 1976		June 1977	Wealdstone	Free
Nicky Evans	Queens Park Rangers Juniors	July 1976		June 1977	Peterborough	Free
Terry Dibble	Queens Park Rangers Juniors	July 1976		June 1977	Bromley	Free

== Transfers In ==
Name	from	Date	Fee
Nicky Ironton	Queens Park Rangers Juniors	July 1976	
Nicky Evans	Queens Park Rangers Juniors	July 1976	
Terry Dibble	Queens Park Rangers Juniors	July 1976	
Paul Haverson	Queens Park Rangers Juniors	August 1976	
Trevor Aylott	Chelsea	August 28, 1976	
Keith Furphy	Ipswich	September 1976	
Eddie Kelly	Arsenal	September 3, 1976	£60,000
Steve Perkins	Chelsea	June 2, 1977	Free
Dave Needham	Notts County	June 8, 1977	£90,000
Bobby Hale	Queens Park Rangers Juniors	June 1977	
