= 1978–79 Queens Park Rangers F.C. season =

English football club season

Queens Park Rangers
1978–79 season
- Chairman: Jim Gregory
- Manager: Frank Sibley (resigns July 29th) Steve Burtenshaw from August 11th to May 10th; Tommy Docherty from May 11th
- Stadium: Loftus Road
- Football League First Division: 20th
- FA Cup: Third round
- Football League Cup: Fourth round
- Top goalscorer: League: Paul Goddard Martyn Busby (5); All: Peter Eastoe (6)
- Highest home attendance: 26,626 v Liverpool (11 November 1978)
- Lowest home attendance: 9,600 v Birmingham City (7 May 1979)
- Average home league attendance: 16, 287
- Biggest win: 5-1 Vs Coventry City (28 April 1979)
- Biggest defeat: 1-5 Vs Arsenal (2 September 1978)
Home colours	Away colours

During the 1978–79 English football season, Queens Park Rangers competed in the First Division

== Season summary ==
QPR finished the season in the last relegation spot under ex-Everton and QPR coach Steve Burtenshaw. There were early exits in both the FA Cup and the League Cup.

== Kit ==
Adidas remained QPR's kit manufacturers.

== First Division ==
Pos	Team	Pld	W	D	L	GF	GA	GD	Pts	Qualification or relegation
18	Wolverhampton Wanderers	42	13	8	21	44	68	−24	34	
19	Derby County	42	10	11	21	44	71	−27	31	
20	Queens Park Rangers (R)	42	6	13	23	45	73	−28	25	Relegation to the Second Division
21	Birmingham City (R)	42	6	10	26	37	64	−27	22	Relegation to the Second Division
22	Chelsea (R)	42	5	10	27	44	92	−48	20	Relegation to the Second Division

Source: World Football
Rules for classification: 1) Points; 2) Goal difference; 3) Goals scored
(R) Relegated

== Results ==
QPR scores given first

Win Draw Loss

=== First Division ===
Date	Opponents	Venue	Result F–A	Scorers	Attendance	Position
19 August 1978	Liverpool	A	1-2	McGee 29'	50,793	18
22 August 1978	West Bromwich Albion	H	0–1		15,481	19
26 August 1978	Nottingham Forest	H	0-0		17,971	19
2 September 1978	Arsenal	A	1-5	McGee	33,474	22
9 September 1978	Manchester United	H	1-1	Gillard 5'	23,477	22
16 September 1978	Middlesbrough	A	2-0	Harkouk Eastoe	12,822	17
23 September 1978	Aston Villa	H	1-0	Harkouk 47'	16.410	15
30 September 1978	Wolverhampton Wanderers	A	0-1		15.481	16
7 October 1978	Bristol City	H	1-0	Busby	15,707	15
14 October 1978	Southampton	A	1-1	Goddard	22.803	13
21 October 1978	Everton	H	1-1	Gillard	21.171	13
28 October 1978	Ipswich Town	A	1-2	Francis	20.428	16
4 November 1978	Chelsea	H	0-0		22.878	15
11 November 1978	Liverpool	H	1-3	Eastoe 27'	26.626	17
18 November 1978	Nottingham Forest	A	0-0		28.036	16
21 November 1978	Arsenal	H	pp			
25 November 1978	Derby	A	1-2	Howe	19.702	18
2 December 1978	Bolton Wanderers	H	1-3	Harkouk	11.635	18
9 December 1978	Coventry	A	0-1		18.717	19
16 December 1978	Manchester City	H	2-1	Hamilton 48', 56'	12.902	18
23 December 1978	Norwich City	A	pp			
26 December 1978	Tottenham Hotspur	H	2-2	Shanks, Bowles	24.845	19
30 December 1978	Leeds United	H	1-4	Eastoe	17.435	19
1 January 1979	Birmingham City	A	pp			
13 January 1979	Manchester United	A	pp			
20 January 1979	Middlesbrough	H	1-1	Goddard	9.899	19
31 January 1979	Norwich	A	1-1	Francis	14.203	19
3 February 1979	Aston Villa	A	pp			
10 February 1979	Wolverhampton Wanderers	H	3-3	Gillard, Busby, Roeder	11.814	19
13 February 1979	Arsenal	H	1-2	Shanks	21.125	19
17 February 1979	Bristol City	A	pp			
24 February 1979	Southampton	H	0-1		13.636	20
28 February 1979	Manchester United	A	0-2		36.085	20
3 March 1979	Everton	A	1-2	Goddard	24.809	20
6 March 1979	Birmingham City	A	1-3	Busby	12.650	20
17 March 1979	Chelsea	A	3-1	Goddard 23', Roeder 65'. Busby 74'	25.871	19
20 March 1979	Aston Villa	A	1-3	Allen 90'	24.310	19
24 March 1979	West Bromwich Albion	A	1-2	McGee	23.678	20
31 March 1979	Derby	H	2-2	Goddard, Walsh	13.988	20
3 April 1979	Bristol City	A	0-2		15.687	20
7 April 1979	Bolton Wanderers	A	1-2	Goddard	21.119	20
9 April 1979	Birmingham City	H	pp			
13 April 1979	Norwich	H	0-0		14.654	20
14 April 1979	Tottenham Hotspur	A	1-1	Clement	28.853	20
21 April 1979	Manchester City	A	1-3	Busby 16'	30.694	20
28 April 1979	Coventry City	H	5-1	Allen 3, Shanks Walsh	10.950	20
4 May 1979	Leeds United	A	3-4	Walsh, Roeder, Busby	20.121	20
7 May 1979	Birmingham City	H	1-3	Roeder	9.600	20
11 May 1979	Ipswich Town	H	0-4		9.819	20

=== Football League Cup ===
Date	Round	Opponents	H / A	Result F–A	Scorers	Attendance
2 August 1978	Second Round First Leg	Preston North End (Second Division)	A	3-1	Eastoe 2, Baxter og	14,913
3 October 1978	Third Round	Swansea (Third Division)	H	2-0	Eastoe, McGee	18,513
7 November 1978	Fourth Round	Leeds United (First Division)	H	0-2		22,769

=== FA Cup ===
Date	Round	Opponents	H / A	Result F–A	Scorers	Attendance
6 January 1979	Third Round	Fulham (Second Division)		PP		
9 January 1979	Third Round	Fulham (Second Division)	A	0-2		21,199

=== Friendlies ===
Date	Location	Opponents	H / A	Result F–A	Scorers	Attendance
21 July 1978	East Germany	FC Homburg (GDR) (A)	A	0-0		500
22 July 1978	East Germany	FC Eintract Trier 05 (GDR) (A)	A	1-2	Busby	5,500
24 July 1978	East Germany	FC Wurztburg 04 (GDR)(A)	A	2-0	Mick Buckley, Busby	3,300
2 August 1978	Netherlands	NAC Breda NLD) (A)	A			
5 August 1978	East Germany	BAD Honnef (GDR) (A)	A	3-1	Goddard 2, Busby	2,000
6 August 1978	East Germany	FC Viktoria (GDR) (A)	A	6-0	Paul McGee 3, Harkouk, Busby, Colin Viljoen	
12 August 1978		Brighton and Hove Albion (A)	A			
13 August 1978	Ian Gillard Testimonial	Entertainers XI (H)	H			
27 November 1978	Ian Hutchison Testimonial	Chelsea (A)	A			
24 April 1979	Ian Gillard Testimonial	Tottenham Hotspur (H)	H			
29 April 1979		Burnham (A)	A			
2 June 1979	Nigeria	IICC (NGA) (A)	A			
4 June 1979	Nigeria	Raccah (NGA) (A)	A			
9 June 1979	Nigeria	Nigeria XI (NGA) (A)	A			

== Squad ==
Pos.	Nat.	Name	League Appearances	League Goals	Cup Appearances	League Cup Goals	Total Appearances	Total Goals
GK	ENG	Phil Parkes	24		3		27	
GK	ENG	Derek Richardson	18		1		19	
DF	ENG	Don Shanks	41	3	4		45	3
DF	ENG	Barry Wallace	4				5	
DF	ENG	Ian Gillard	38	3	4		42	3
DF	ENG	Dave Clement	29	1	2		31	1
DF	ENG	Ernie Howe	38	1	4		42	1
DF	ENG	Glenn Roeder	27	4	1		28	4
DF	ENG	Thomas Cunningham	9		3		12	
MF	WAL	Karl Elsey	2				3	
MF	ENG	Ron Abbott					3	
MF	ALG	Rachid Harkouk	14	3	2		17	
MF	IRE	Paul McGee	18	3	3	1	25	4
MF	ENG	Gerry Francis	31	2	2		33	2
MF	ENG	John Hollins	41		4		45	
MF	ENG	Martyn Busby	29	6	3		38	6
FW	WAL	Leighton James	1				1	
FW	ENG	Mickey Walsh	10	3			10	3
FW	ENG	Clive Allen	4	4			10	
FW	NIR	Billy Hamilton	8	2	1		12	2
FW	ENG	Paul Goddard	20	6			23	6
FW	ENG	Peter Eastoe	26	3	4	3	30	5
FW	ENG	Stan Bowles	30	1	4		34	1

== Transfers Out ==
Name	from	Date	Fee	Date	Club	Fee
Mick Leach	Queens Park Rangers Juniors	Feb 21,1964		July 1978	Detroit Express	£30,000
Don Givens	Luton Town	July 20, 1972	£35,000	August 1978	Birmingham City	£150,000
Colin Viljoen	Ipswich	July 21, 1978	Loan	August 1978	Ipswich	Loan
Leighton James	Derby County	Oct 27,1977	Don Masson	September 1978	Burnley	£165,000
Steve Perkins	Chelsea	June 2, 1977	Free	October 1978	Wimbledon	Free
Paul Haverson	Queens Park Rangers Juniors	August 1976		October 1978	Wimbledon	Free
Steve Jones	Queens Park Rangers Juniors	July 25, 1975		January 1979	Walsall	£30,000
Phil Parkes	Walsall	June 23, 1970	£15,000	February 1979	West Ham United	£565,000
Peter Eastoe	Swindon	Mar 11,1976	Don Rogers & £100,000	March 1979	Everton	Mickey Walsh
Tommy Cunningham	Chelsea	May 5, 1975	Free	March 1979	Wimbledon	£45,000
Gerry Francis	Queens Park Rangers Juniors	June 1969		May 1979	Crystal Palace	£465,000
Ron Abbott	Queens Park Rangers Juniors	July 1971		June 1979	Fisher Athletic	
Bobby Hale	Queens Park Rangers Juniors	June 1977		June 1979		Free
Craig Richards	Queens Park Rangers Juniors	July 1978		June 1979	Wimbledon	Free

== Transfers In ==
Name	from	Date	Fee
Dean Neal	Queens Park Rangers Juniors	July 1978	
Craig Richards	Queens Park Rangers Juniors	July 1978	
Colin Viljoen	Ipswich	July 21, 1978	Loan
Glenn Roeder	Orient	August 10, 1978	£250,000
Clive Allen	Queens Park Rangers Juniors	September 20, 1978	
Karl Elsey	Pembroke Borough	January 1979	
Dean Neal	Queens Park Rangers Juniors	January 1979	
Mickey Walsh	Everton	March 29, 1979	Peter Eastoe
Peter Davidson	Berwick Rangers	June 27, 1979	£30,000
Chris Woods	Nottingham	June 28, 1979	£250,000
