= 1974–75 Queens Park Rangers F.C. season =

English football club season

Queens Park Rangers
1974–75 season
- Chairman: Jim Gregory
- Manager: Gordon Jago to 27 September 1974 Stan Anderson to 16 October 1974 Dave Sexton
- Football League First Division: 11th
- FA Cup: Fifth round
- Football League Cup: Third round
- Top goalscorer: League: Don Givens (16); All: Don Givens (20)
- Highest home attendance: 28.356 v West Ham United (30 November 1974)
- Lowest home attendance: 13.244 v Sheffield United (14 December 1974)
- Average home league attendance: 19,861
- Biggest win: 4–1 Vs Derby County (1 February 1975)
- Biggest defeat: 0–4 Vs Newcastle (8 October 1974)
Home colours	Away colours	Third colours

During the 1974–75 English football season, Queens Park Rangers competed in the First Division

== Season summary ==
QPR started the season poorly and were bottom in November but with new manager Dave Sexton they recovered to finish in 11th place. In September Gordon Jago's last signing before he left and was replaced by Dave Sexton. was Prolific Don Rogers who joined QPR in an exchange deal in which Terry Venables + Ian Evans & cash went to Malcolm Allison's Crystal Palace. At the time Rogers seemed like a brilliant QPR signing and a replacement for Stan Bowles who was (again) on the transfer list. December signings were Don Masson.from Notts County for £100,000 and ex England Youth player Don Shanks from Luton

== Kit ==
Admiral and Umbro were QPR's kit manufacturers.

== League table ==
=== First Division ===
Pos	Team	Pld	W	D	L	GF	GA	GAv	Pts	Qualification or relegation
9	Leeds United	42	16	13	13	57	49	1.163	45	
10	Burnley	42	17	11	14	68	67	1.015	45	
11	Queens Park Rangers	42	16	10	16	54	54	1.000	42	
12	Wolverhampton Wanderers	42	14	11	17	57	54	1.056	39	
13	West Ham United	42	13	13	16	58	59	0.983	39	Qualification for the European Cup Winners' Cup first round (Note: West Ham United qualified for the European Cup Winners' Cup as the 1974-75 FA Cup winners.)

Source: World Football
Rules for classification: 1) Points; 2) Goal average; 3) Goals scored

== Results ==
QPR scores given first

Win Draw Loss

=== First Division ===
Date	Opponents	Venue	Result F–A	Scorers	Attendance	Position
17 August 1974	Sheffield United	A	1–1	Francis	16,032	10
21 August 1974	Leeds United	A	1–0	Francis	31,497	6
24 August 1974	Stoke City	H	0–1		21,117	12
27 August 1974	Leeds United	H	1–1	Givens	24,965	12
31 August 1974	Luton Town	A	1–1	Bowles	18,535	12
7 September 1974	Birmingham City	H	0–1		16,058	15
14 September 1974	Leicester City	A	1–3	Francis	19,763	17
21 September 1974	Newcastle United	H	1–2	Keeley og	18,594	20
24 September 1974	Everton	H	2–2	Givens 41', Busby75'	16,638	19
28 September 1974	Manchester City	A	0–1		30,647	22
5 October 1974	Ipswich Town	H	1–0	Francis	19,494	17
12 October 1974	Arsenal	A	2–2	Bowles 2	29,690	18
16 October 1974	Stoke City (A)	A	pp			
19 October 1974	Liverpool	H	0–1		27,392	20
26 October 1974	Wolverhampton Wanderers	A	2–1	Givens 2	20,320	19
2 November 1974	Coventry City	H	2–0	Bowles 41', Givens 81'	17,256	16
9 November 1974	Derby	A	2–5	Leach, Bowles	23,339	18
16 November 1974	Carlisle United	H	2–1	Thomas, Bowles	15,700	15
23 November 1974	Middlesbrough	A	3–1	Rogers, Bowles, Givens	27,530	14
27 November 1974	Stoke City	A	0–1		22,403	14
30 November 1974	West Ham United	H	0–2		28,356	17
7 December 1974	Burnley	A	0–3		16,487	17
14 December 1974	Sheffield United	H	1–0	Rogers	13,244	17
21 December 1974	Tottenham Hotspur	A	2–1	Bowles 2	21,150	15
26 December 1974	Leicester City	H	4–2	Thomas, WestwoodBeck, Givens	17,311	13
28 December 1974	Chelsea	A	3–0	Givens 65' 70', Francis 50'	38,917	13
11 January 1975	Burnley	H	0–1		19,359	13
18 January 1975	West Ham United	A	2–2	Masson 32', Bowles 72'	28,772	12
1 February 1975	Derby County	H	4–1	Givens 3 Thomas	20,686	11
8 February 1975	Coventry City	A	1–1	Leach	18,807	12
15 February 1975	Middlesbrough (H)	H	pp			
22 February 1975	Carlisle United	A	2–1	Givens 2	13,176	13
25 February 1975	Middlesbrough	H	0–0		18,487	11
1 March 1975	Luton Town	H	2–1	Givens 38', Rogers 83'	19,583	10
8 March 1975	Everton	A	1–2	Givens	39,567	11
15 March 1975	Manchester City	H	2–0	Rogers 55', 85'	22,102	10
18 March 1975	Chelsea	H	1–0	Thomas 3'	25,324	7
22 March 1975	Birmingham City	A	1–4	Thomas	32,832	9
29 March 1975	Tottenham Hotspur	H	0–1		25,461	11
31 March 1975	Newcastle United	A	2–2	Gillard, Francis	28,490	11
5 April 1975	Wolverhampton Wanderers	H	2–0	Thomas, Givens	16,596	8
12 April 1975	Ipswich Town	A	1–2	Gillard	28,709	11
19 April 1975	Arsenal	H	0–0		24,362	11
26 April 1975	Liverpool	A	1–3	Francis 64' Pen	42,546	11

=== Football League Cup ===
Date	Round	Opponents	H / A	Result F–A	Scorers	Attendance
10 September 1974	Second Round First Leg	Leyton Orient (Second Division)	H	1–1	Francis	14,604
17 September 1974	Second Round Second Leg	Leyton Orient (Second Division)	A	3–0	FrancisGivens, Bowles	11,750
8 October 1974	Third Round	Newcastle (First Division)	H	0–4		15,815

=== FA Cup ===
Date	Round	Opponents	H / A	Result F–A	Scorers	Attendance
4 January 1975	Third Round	Southend (Third Division)	A	2–2	Gillard, Francis	18,100
7 January 1975	Third Round Replay	Southend (Third Division)	A	2–0	Givens 2	21,484
24 January 1975	Fourth Round	Notts County (Second Division)	H	3–0	Givens, ThomasBowles	23,428
15 February 1975	Fifth Round	West Ham United (First Division)	A	1–2	Clement	39,193

=== Friendlies ===
Date	Location	Opponents	H / A	Result F–A	Scorers	Attendance
1 August 1974	Holland	Elinkwijk (Utrecht) (NLD) (A)				
3 August 1974	Holland	AZ 67 (NLD) (A)				
6 August 1974	Belgium	Royal Liege (BEL) (A)				
10 August 1974		Maidstone United (A)				
3 September 1974	John McCormick Testimonial	Crystal Palace (A)				
3 March 1975	Frankie Howard Testimonial	Brighton and Hove Albion (A)				
14 May 1975	Norway	SK Vard Haugesund (NOR) (A)				
16 May 1975	Norway	Brann Bergen (NOR) (A)				
21 May 1975	France	France A (FRA) (A)				

== Squad ==
Position	Nationality	Name	League Appearances	League Goals	Cup Appearances	F.A.Cup Goals	League.Cup Goals	Total Appearances	Total Goals
GK	(England)	Phil Parkes	41		6			47	
GK	(England)	Richard Teale	1		1			2	
DF	(England)	Ron Abbott	6(3)					9	
DF	(England)	Dave Clement	31		6	1		37	1
DF	(England)	Tony Hazell	12		2			14	
DF	(England)	Ian Gillard	42	2	7	1		49	3
DF	(England)	Danny Westwood	(1)		1			2	1
DF	(Scotland)	Frank McLintock	30		4			34	
DF	(England)	Terry Mancini	7		2			9	
DF	(England)	Don Shanks	12					12	
DF	(England)	David Webb	33(1)		6			40	
DF	(Scotland)	Keith Pritchett	4					4	
MF	(England)	John Beck	27(2)	1	6			35	1
MF	(England)	Martyn Busby	12(2)	1	2			16	1
MF	(England)	Gerry Francis	35	7	7	1	2	42	10
MF	(England)	Mick Leach	16(4)	2	3			23	2
MF	(Scotland)	Don Masson	21	1	4			25	1
FW	(England)	Terry Venables	5		1			6	
FW	(England)	Stan Bowles	33	10	7	1	1	40	12
FW	(England)	Don Rogers	13(6)	5				19	5
FW	(Republic of Ireland)	Don Givens	40	17	7	3	1	47	21
FW	(England)	Dave Thomas	41		6	1		47	7

== Transfers Out ==
Name	from	Date	Fee	Date	Club	Fee
Ian Watson	Chelsea	July 1965		July 1974	Retired (injury)	
John Delve	Queens Park Rangers Juniors	July 12, 1971		July 1974	Plymouth Argyle	£30,000
Ian Evans	Queens Park Rangers Juniors	January 1970		September 18, 1974	Crystal Palace	Don Rogers
Terry Venables	Tottenham Hotspur	June 25, 1969	£70,000	September 18, 1974	Crystal Palace	Don Rogers
Terry Mancini	Leyton Orient	October 10, 1971	£25,000	October 1974	Arsenal	£20,000
Alan Mayes	Queens Park Rangers Juniors	July 12, 1971		November 1974	Watford	£8,000
Tony Hazell	Queens Park Rangers Juniors	October 12, 1964		December 1974	Millwall	£40,000
John Docherty	Brentford	July 1974	Free	January 1975	Retired (Brentford manager)	
Mike French	Eastbourne	May 1973		March 1975	Brentford	£2,000

== Transfers In ==
Name	from	Date	Fee
Danny Westwood	Billericay Town	July 1974	
David Webb	Chelsea	July 11, 1974	£120,000
John Docherty	Brentford	July 1974	Free
Don Rogers	Crystal Palace	September 18, 1974	Ian Evans & Terry Venables
Don Shanks	Luton Town	November 29, 1974	£35,000
Don Masson	Notts County	December 11, 1974	£100,000
Tony Tagg	Queens Park Rangers Juniors	March 1975	
Tommy Cunningham	Chelsea	May 5, 1975	Free

== Notes and references ==
- "Seasonal Stats - Files". QPRnet. Archived from the original on 2 December 2021.
