= 1973–74 Queens Park Rangers F.C. season =

English football club season

Queens Park Rangers
1973–74 season
- Chairman: Jim Gregory
- Manager: Gordon Jago
- Football League First Division: 8th
- FA Cup: Quarter Final
- Football League Cup: Fourth round
- London Challenge Cup: Semi-Final
- Top goalscorer: League: Stan Bowles (19); All: Stan Bowles (22)
- Highest home attendance: 35.353 v Leeds United
- Lowest home attendance: 12,427 v Norwich City
- Average home league attendance: 22,867
- Biggest win: 8–2 Vs Sheffield Wednesday (6 November 1973)
- Biggest defeat: 0–4 Vs Birmingham City (23 April 1974)
Home colours	Away colours	Third colours

During the 1973–74 English football season, Queens Park Rangers competed in the First Division

== Season summary ==
QPR returned to the first division but after placing 5th with 1 win in the last nine games fell away to 8th place.

In the League cup after an 8–2 win over Sheffield Wednesday, there was a home defeat to Plymouth Argyle.

QPR's run in the Fa Cup ended in defeat at home to Leicester City in the Quarter finals.

== Kit ==
Admiral were QPR's kit manufacturers.

== Table ==
=== First Division ===
Pos	Team	Pld	W	D	L	GF	GA	GAv	Pts
6	Burnley	42	16	14	12	56	53	1.057	46
7	Everton	42	16	12	14	50	48	1.042	44
8	Queens Park Rangers	42	13	17	12	56	52	1.077	43
9	Leicester City	42	13	16	13	51	41	1.244	42
10	Arsenal	42	14	14	14	49	51	0.961	42

Source: World Football
Rules for classification: 1) Points; 2) Goal average; 3) Goals scored

== Results ==
QPR scores given first

Win Draw Loss

=== First Division ===
Date	Opponents	Venue	Result F–A	Scorers	Attendance	Position
25 August 1973	Southampton	H	1–1	Givens	18.602	12
29 August 1973	Norwich City	A	0–0		24,860	14
1 September 1973	Manchester United	A	1–2	Francis 59'	44.156	15
4 September 1973	West Ham United	H	0–0		28.360	16
8 September 1973	Stoke City	H	3–3	Leach, Mancini, Venables	18.118	12
10 September 1973	West Ham United	A	3–2	Abbott, Givens 2	28.360	9
15 September 1973	Everton	A	0–1		30.795	13
22 September 1973	Birmingham City	H	2–2	Hynd OG, Bowles	18.701	12
29 September 1973	Newcastle United	A	3–2	Francis, Thomas, Leach	26.173	11
6 October 1973	Chelsea	H	1–1	Bowles 24'	31.009	11
13 October 1973	Burnley	A	1–2	Thomas	18.297	14
20 October 1973	Wolverhampton Wanderers	A	4–2	Bowles 2, Francis, Leach	19.350	12
27 October 1973	Arsenal	H	2–0	Bowles 69', Givens 56'	29.115	10
3 November 1973	Derby County	A	2–1	Bowles, Francis	30.647	8
10 November 1973	Coventry City	H	3–0	Bowles, Venables, Francis	20.416	7
17 November 1973	Manchester City	A	0–1		23.339	7
24 November 1973	Liverpool	H	2–2	McLintock 80', Bowles 53'	26.254	7
1 December 1973	Leeds United	A	2–2	Thomas, Bowles	32.194	7
8 December 1973	Sheffield United	H	0–0		15.843	6
15 December 1973	Leicester City	A	0–2		17.614	9
18 December 1973	Newcastle United	H	pp			
22 December 1973	Newcastle United	H	3–2	Clement 26', Bowles 90', Givens 36'	15.757	6
26 December 1973	Tottenham Hotspur	A	0–0		30.762	7
29 December 1973	Stoke City	A	1–4	Leach	18,910	10
1 January 1974	Manchester United	H	3–0	Bowles 35', 65', Givens 19'	32.339	8
9 February 1974	Birmingham City	A	pp			
12 January 1974	Everton	H	1–0	Givens 69'	19.051	5
19 January 1974	Southampton	A	2–2	Thomas, Francis	22.689	10
2 February 1974	Leicester City	H	0–0		22,646	6
5 February 1974	Norwich City	H	1–2	Bowles	12.427	6
16 February 1974	Burnley	H	pp			
23 February 1974	Chelsea	A	3–3	Bowles 28', 81, Givens 40'	34.264	8
27 February 1974	Burnley	H	2–1	Givens	21.306	5
2 March 1974	Tottenham Hotspur	H	3–1	Givens 21', Francis 82', Bowles 43'	25.775	4
9 March 1974	Arsenal	A	pp			
16 March 1974	Wolverhampton Wanderers	H	0–0		21.209	5
23 March 1974	Coventry City	A	1–0	Francis	18.804	4
30 March 1974	Derby County	H	0–0		19.795	5
6 April 1974	Liverpool	A	1–2	Thomas 47'	54.027	5
9 April 1974	Manchester City	H	3–0	Leach 11' 67', Bowles 28'	20.461	5
12 April 1974	Ipswich Town	H	0–1		27.567	5
15 April 1974	Ipswich Town	A	0–1		26.100	6
20 April 1974	Sheffield United	A	1–1	Givens	17.933	7
23 April 1974	Birmingham City	A	0–4		39.160	8
27 April 1974	Leeds United	H	0–1		35.353	8
30 April 1974	Arsenal	A	1–1	Bowles	40.396	8

=== London Challenge Cup ===
Date	Round	Opponents	H / A	Result F–A	Scorers	Attendance
24 September 1973	First Round	Millwall	A	1–0		
15 October 1973	Quarter-Final	Brentford	A	0–0*aet		
31 October 1973	Quarter-Final Replay	Brentford	H	2–1		
13 November 1973	Semi-Final	Hayes	H	0–0		
	Semi-Final Replay	Hayes	A	0–2		

=== Football League Cup ===
Date	Round	Opponents	H / A	Result F–A	Scorers	Attendance
8 October 1973	Second Round	Tottenham Hotspur (First Division)	H	1–0	Givens 32'	23,353
6 November 1973	Third Round	Sheffield Wednesday (Second Division)	H	8–2	Francis, Givens 2, Bowles, Leach 2, Mullen OG, Cameron OG	16,043
20 November 1973	Fourth Round	Plymouth Argyle (Third Division)	H	0–3		19,072

=== FA Cup ===
Date	Round	Opponents	H / A	Result F–A	Scorers	Attendance
5 January 1974	Third Round	Chelsea (First Division)	A	0–0		31,540
8 January 1974	Third Round Replay	Chelsea (First Division)	H			
15 January 1974	Third Round Replay	Chelsea (First Division)	H	1–0	Bowles 63'	28,573
26 January 1974	Fourth Round	Birmingham City (First Division)	H	2–0	Leach, Givens	23,367
16 February 1974	Fifth Round	Coventry City (First Division)	A	0–0		30,081
19 February 1974	Fifth Round Replay	Coventry City (First Division)	H	3–2	Givens, Thomas, Bowles	28,010
18 March 1974	Quarter Final	Leicester City (First Division)	H	0–2		34,078

=== Friendlies ===
Date	Location	Opponents	H / A	Result F–A	Scorers	Attendance
30 July 1973	Sweden	Karlstad (SWE)	A			
1 August 1973	Sweden	Ámál (SWE)	A			
3 August 1973	Norway	Frederikstad (NOR)	A			
6 August 1973	Sweden	Kungshamns IF (SWE)	A			
15 August 1973		Orient	A			
18 August 1973		Millwall	A			
3 May 1974	Ron Hunt Testimonial	Crystal Palace	H			
14 May 1974	Jamaica	Santos (JAM)	A			
19 May 1974	Jamaica	Jamaica All Stars (JAM)	A			

== Squad ==
Position	Nationality	Name	League Appearances	League Goals	Cup Appearances	F.A.Cup Goals	League.Cup Goals	Total Appearances	Total Goals
GK	(England)	Phil Parkes	42		9			51	
GK	(England)	Richard Teale							
DF	(England)	Ron Abbott	3(4)	1				7	1
DF	(England)	Dave Clement	38	2	7			45	2
DF	(England)	Tony Hazell	29(3)		5			37	
DF	(England)	Ian Gillard	23		6			29	
DF	(Scotland)	Frank McLintock	26	1	9			35	1
DF	(England)	Terry Mancini	40	1	9			49	1
DF	(England)	Ian Evans	5					5	
DF	(England)	Ian Watson	6					6	
MF	(England)	John Beck	2(3)					5	
MF	(England)	Martyn Busby	5(3)		1			9	
MF	(England)	Gerry Francis	40	8	9		1	49	9
MF	(England)	Mick Leach	39(1)	6	8	1	2	48	9
MF	(England)	John Delve	3(4)					7	
FW	(England)	Terry Venables	36	2	9			45	2
FW	(England)	Stan Bowles	42	19	9	2	1	51	22
FW	(Republic of Ireland)	Don Givens	42	10	9	2	3	51	15
FW	(England)	Dave Thomas	41	6	9	1		50	7

== Transfers Out ==
Name	from	Date	Fee	Date	Club	Fee
Alan Spratley	Queens Park Rangers Juniors	May 1967		July 1973	Swindon Town	£10,000
Mike Ferguson	Aston Villa	20 November 1969	£15,000	July 1973	Cambridge United	Free
Ian Morgan	Queens Park Rangers Juniors	September 1964		October 1973	Watford	£10,000
Ian Watson	Chelsea	July 1965	£10,000	November 1973	Retired (Injury)	
John O'Rourke	Coventry City	16 October 1971	£60,000	January 1974	Bournemouth	£40,000
Ray Seary	Queens Park Rangers Juniors	September 1970		March 1974	Cambridge United	£3,000
Gary Williams		November 1972		June 74	Barnet	Free
Paul Kempton		July ?1973		June? 74		

== Transfers In ==
Name	from	Date	Fee
Richard Teale	Walton & Hersham	July 1973	£9,000
Paul Kempton		July ?1973	
Keith Pritchett	Doncaster Rovers	March 1974	Free
