= Steve Jones =

Steve or Steven Jones may refer to:

== Arts and entertainment ==
- Steve Jones (English presenter) (born 1945), English musician, disk jockey, television presenter, and voice-over artist
- Steve Jones (musician) (born 1955), English rock and roll guitarist and singer, member of the Sex Pistols
- Steve Jones (Welsh presenter) (born 1977), Welsh television presenter
- Steve Jones (fl. 1980s), American musician (The Unforgiven) and television producer

== Science and medicine ==
- Steve Jones (biologist) (born 1944), Welsh geneticist
- Steven E. Jones (born 1949), American physicist and conspiracy theorist
- Steve G. Jones (born 1967), American clinical hypnotherapist

== Sports ==
=== Association football (soccer) ===
- Steve Jones (footballer, born 1955), English footballer
- Steve Jones (footballer, born 1957), English footballer
- Steve Jones (footballer, born 1960), English footballer
- Steve Jones (footballer, born 1962), Welsh footballer
- Steve Jones (footballer, born 1964), Welsh footballer
- Steve Jones (footballer, born March 1970), English footballer
- Steve Jones (footballer, born December 1970), English footballer
- Steve Jones (footballer, born 1976), Northern Irish international footballer

=== Rugby ===
- Steve Jones (rugby union, born 1951) (1951–2007), Welsh rugby union player
- Steve Jones (rugby union, born 1977), Welsh rugby union player
- Steve Jones (rugby league) (born 1983), rugby league footballer who played in the 2000s

=== Other sports ===
- Steve Jones (baseball) (born 1941), American baseball pitcher
- Steve "Snapper" Jones (1942–2017), American basketball player
- Steve Jones (cricketer) (born 1949), Australian cricketer
- Steve Jones (American football) (born 1951), American football player
- Steven Jones (poker player), aka The 4bettor from the Desert, quarter-professional poker player and semi-professional real estate broker
- Steve Jones (runner) (born 1955), Welsh athlete
- Steve Jones (cyclist) (born 1957), British cyclist
- Steve Jones (golfer) (born 1958), American golfer
- Steven Jones Jr. (born 1999), American football player

== Others ==
- Steve C. Jones (born 1957), American judge, United States District Court for the Northern District of Georgia
- Steve Jones (aviator) (born 1960), British pilot
- Steven Edward Jones, perpetrator of the 2015 Northern Arizona University shooting

== See also ==
- Stephen Jones (disambiguation)
- Staff Jones (born 1959), Wales international rugby union footballer who played in the 1980s
