= 1975–76 British Home Championship =

Tournament details
- Dates: 6–15 May 1976
- Teams: 4

Final positions
- Champions: Scotland (40th title)
- Runners-up: England

Tournament statistics
- Matches played: 6
- Goals scored: 16 (2.67 per match)
- Top scorer: (England) Mick Channon (3)

The 1975–76 British Home Championship was a football tournament played between the British Home Nations at the end of the 1975–76 season. It resulted in an outright Scottish victory following a rare whitewash of all three opponents, including England in a tough final at home in Glasgow. Scotland again refused to travel to Northern Ireland and therefore gained an additional home match. The Scottish team of the middle of the 1970s was one of the best sides the nation has ever fielded, being the only British team to qualify for a major championships between 1971 and 1980. They began well, beating Wales, who also lost to England in the early exchanges. Both title contenders then inflicted heavy defeats on Northern Ireland and both went into the final match looking for a win, as a draw would result in a disappointing tie for first place. The match was full of incident, but the Scots eventually ran out 2–1 winners, taking the cup outright for the first time since the 1967 British Home Championship, when England were World Champions. The Welsh gained some consolation, defeating Northern Ireland in their final match to take third place.

== Table ==
Team	Pld	W	D	L	GF	GA	GD	Pts
Scotland (C)	3	3	0	0	8	2	+6	6
England	3	2	0	1	6	2	+4	4
Wales	3	1	0	2	2	4	−2	2
Northern Ireland	3	0	0	3	0	8	−8	0

Rules for classification: 1) points. The points system worked as follows: 2 points for a win and 1 point for a draw.
(C) Champions

== Results ==
6 May 1976

Scotland	3–1	Wales
Pettigrew 39'; Rioch 44'; Gray 69'		Griffiths 61' (pen.)

Hampden Park, Glasgow
Referee: Malcolm Wright (Northern Ireland)

8 May 1976

Wales	0–1	England
		Taylor 58'

Ninian Park, Cardiff
Referee: Bobby Davidson (Scotland)

8 May 1976

Scotland	3–0	Northern Ireland
Gemmill 23'; Masson 47'; Dalglish 52'

Hampden Park, Glasgow
Referee: Thomas Reynolds (Wales)

11 May 1976

England	4–0	Northern Ireland
Francis 34'; Channon 35' (pen.), 75'; Pearson 63'

Wembley Stadium, London
Referee: Clive Thomas (Wales)

14 May 1976

Wales	1–0	Northern Ireland
James 24'

Vetch Field, Swansea
Referee: Ken Burns (England)

15 May 1976

Scotland	2–1	England
Masson 17'; Dalglish 49'		Channon 11'

Hampden Park, Glasgow
Referee: Károly Palotai (Hungary)
