= Paul Clement (football manager) =

English association football player and manager (born 1972)

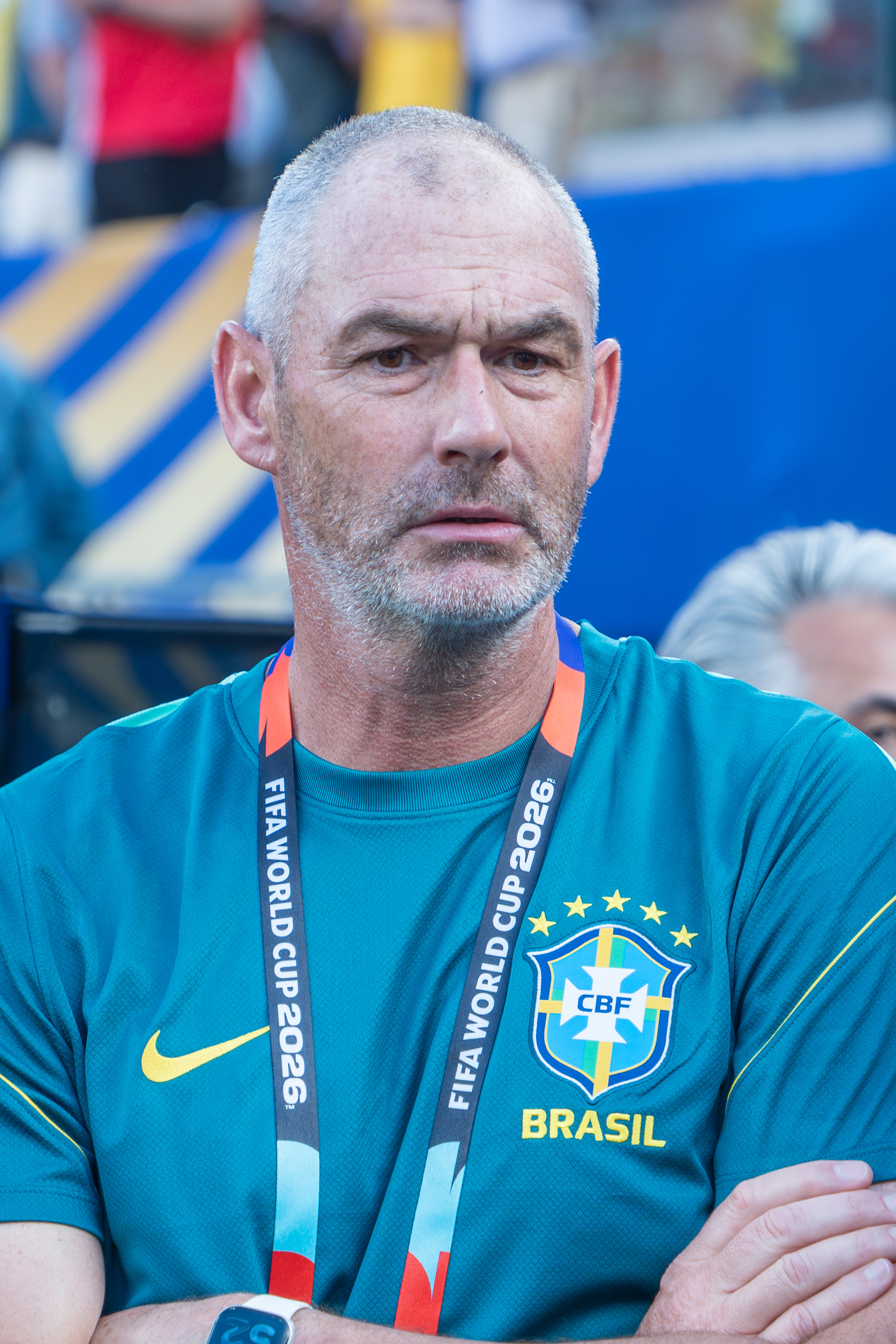
- Clement with Brazil at the 2026 FIFA World Cup

Personal information
- Full name: Paul Clement
- Date of birth: 8 January 1972 (age 54)
- Place of birth: Wandsworth, England

Team information
- Current team: Brazil (assistant coach)

Senior career*
Years	Team	Apps	(Gls)
1988–1991	Banstead Athletic		
1991–1994	Corinthian Casuals		

Managerial career
- 2015–2016: Derby County
- 2017: Swansea City
- 2018: Reading
- 2020–2021: Cercle Brugge
- 2025–: Brazil (assistant)
- * Club domestic league appearances and goals

Paul Clement (born 8 January 1972) is an English professional football manager and former player who is currently the assistant coach of the Brazil national team.

Clement has previously been assistant manager to Carlo Ancelotti several times – at Chelsea, Paris Saint-Germain, Real Madrid, and Bayern Munich. In his first season as assistant manager, he won the Premier League title with Ancelotti at Chelsea. They also won the UEFA Champions League title and Copa del Rey in their first season at Real Madrid.

Clement obtained his UEFA Pro Licence in 2009, and made his managerial debut with Derby County in 2015. He has managed Derby, Swansea City, Reading, and Cercle Brugge and has previously held coaching roles at Fulham, Blackburn Rovers, Everton, and the England under-21 and Republic of Ireland under-21 teams.

== Career ==
=== Early coaching ===
Clement was born in Wandsworth, London. He is the elder son of former Queens Park Rangers and England player Dave Clement and brother of former West Bromwich Albion player Neil Clement. Paul Clement, however, did not progress as a player beyond non-league football with Banstead Athletic and Corinthian Casuals. He concentrated on coaching from the age of 23, as he worked in the Chelsea Centre of Excellence while holding down a job as a PE teacher at Glenthorne High School. Clement obtained his UEFA 'A' coaching licence in 1999 and became a full-time football coach in 2000, when Fulham appointed him to a role in their academy having been their Head of Education and Welfare. Clement also helped coach the Republic of Ireland national under-21 football team, working with Don Givens.

=== Chelsea ===
Clement returned to Chelsea in 2007, initially working with their under-16 team. He progressed through the coaching ranks there, working under managers José Mourinho, Avram Grant, and Luiz Felipe Scolari. He took charge of the Chelsea reserve team, replacing Brendan Rodgers, before working with the Chelsea first team when Guus Hiddink was appointed manager in 2009. Clement then became assistant manager to Carlo Ancelotti during his two seasons at Chelsea. They went on to win the Premier League title and FA Cup in their first season in charge. Ancelotti was dismissed in his second season and Clement left the club soon after.

After Chelsea, Clement briefly worked as a coach at Blackburn Rovers for four months, assisting Steve Kean in the 2011–12 season.

=== Paris Saint-Germain ===
Clement was then hired by Paris Saint-Germain after Ancelotti had been appointed their head coach mid-season in December 2011. The pair won the Ligue 1 title in their only full season at the club; it was PSG's first league title since 1994. Whilst at the club, Clement coached players such as David Beckham and Zlatan Ibrahimović.

=== Real Madrid ===
Clement was appointed assistant manager at Real Madrid after Ancelotti became their head coach in June 2013. During his time at the club, Clement worked alongside Zinedine Zidane and coached players including Sergio Ramos, Xabi Alonso and Cristiano Ronaldo. He helped them win the Copa del Rey and tenth UEFA Champions League title, along with the UEFA Super Cup, at the end of his first season at the Bernabéu. They also went on to win the club's first FIFA Club World Cup in 2014.

After the team failed to win La Liga in their second season, Ancelotti was dismissed on 25 May 2015 and Clement left the club four days later.

=== Derby County ===
Soon after, on 1 June 2015, Clement was appointed manager of Championship club Derby County, who had dismissed Steve McClaren after finishing eighth the previous season. Despite only losing once in 19 games from September to December, Clement was dismissed on 8 February 2016 after one win in seven. His final match was a 1–1 draw against Fulham. They were in fifth place at the time he was dismissed. He finished with a record of 14 wins, 12 draws, and seven losses.

In a statement, club chairman Mel Morris said that a lack of progress had been made under Clement, despite the club being only five points behind leaders Hull City. Clement's style of football was also cited as a contributing factor.

After leaving Derby, Clement briefly helped coach the England under-21 team, working under manager Gareth Southgate.

=== Bayern Munich ===
Clement was hired by Bayern Munich in June 2016 as their assistant manager, again working alongside Ancelotti. He helped Bayern to win the 2016 DFL-Supercup, beating Borussia Dortmund 2–0. Whilst at the club, Clement and Ancelotti changed their usual coaching method of man marking to resemble the zonal marking employed by former Bayern manager Pep Guardiola. As of December 2016, Clement and Ancelotti only lost one match during their time in the Bundesliga.

=== Swansea City ===
Clement was appointed as the new head coach of Premier League club Swansea City on 3 January 2017, with the club in the relegation zone having dismissed their second manager of the season, Bob Bradley. Claude Makélélé joined him as his assistant; Clement and Makélélé had previously coached at Paris Saint-Germain.

Clement recorded his first victory as Swansea boss with a 3–2 win over Jürgen Klopp's Liverpool. (Note: Clement was appointed immediately prior to Swansea's win against Crystal Palace, but on the touchline, he aided caretaker Alan Curtis who took charge of the game.) Clement was named Premier League Manager of the Month for January after a successful first month in charge, earning nine points in four games for Swansea. Under his guidance, Swansea won 26 points from 18 games, ultimately securing the club's Premier League status. Clement was nominated for Manager of the Season in recognition of this achievement.

After a poor start to the 2017–18 season, Clement was criticised for playing "boring" and "negative" football, with some Swansea fans questioning his tactical decisions. Others, notably The Guardian journalist Stuart James, criticised chairman Huw Jenkins and the club's American owners for a poor transfer window, in which the club sold key performers Fernando Llorente and Gylfi Sigurðsson from the previous season. Clement was dismissed on 20 December 2017, leaving the club bottom of the league table and four points adrift of safety.

=== Reading ===
Jaap Stam left Championship club Reading by mutual consent on 21 March 2018; Clement was announced as his successor two days later on a three-year contract. He was dismissed on 6 December 2018 after poor results left the club outside of the relegation zone only on goal difference.

=== Cercle Brugge ===
Clement was appointed as the new head coach of Cercle Brugge on 3 July 2020 on a three-year contract. He was dismissed on 1 February 2021.

=== Everton ===
On 31 January 2022, Clement was appointed as a first team coach at Everton as part of Frank Lampard's backroom staff. Clement left the club almost one year later on 23 January 2023, following Lampard's dismissal as manager.

=== Asteras Tripolis ===
On 12 September 2024, it was reported that Clement was set to join Claude Makélélé as his assistant at top-flight Greek side Asteras Tripolis, a reversal of their coaching roles at Swansea City. However, Makelele left the club three weeks later, allegedly over board interference in his squad selections and tactics.

=== Brazil ===
In May 2025, he returned to work with Carlo Ancelotti, joining his coaching staff with the Brazil national team.

== Managerial statistics ==
As of match played 31 January 2021

Managerial record by team and tenure
Team	From	To	Record					Ref.
Team	From	To	P	W	D	L	Win %	Ref.
Derby County	1 June 2015	8 February 2016	33	14	12	7	42.4	
Swansea City	3 January 2017	20 December 2017	41	14	5	22	34.1	
Reading	23 March 2018	6 December 2018	30	7	8	15	23.3	
Cercle Brugge	3 July 2020	1 February 2021	25	7	1	17	28.0	
Total			129	42	26	61	32.6	—

== Honours ==
=== Manager ===
Individual

- Football Association Senior First Team Coach of the Year: 2015
- Premier League Manager of the Month: January 2017

=== Assistant manager ===
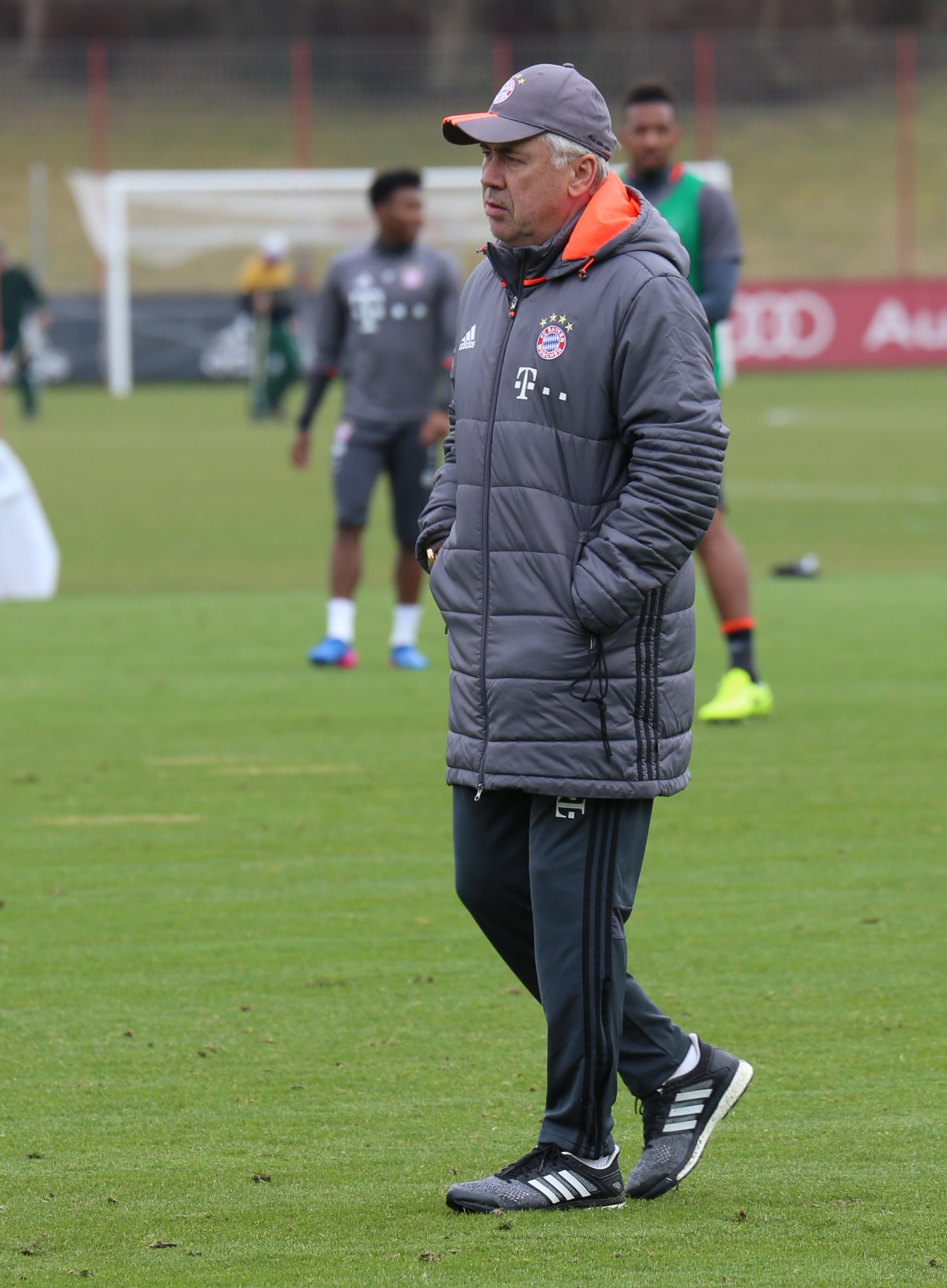
Clement regularly assisted Carlo Ancelotti, an experience he described as "invaluable".

Chelsea

- Premier League: 2009–10
- FA Cup: 2009–10
- FA Community Shield: 2009

Paris Saint-Germain

- Ligue 1: 2012–13

Real Madrid

- Copa del Rey: 2013–14
- UEFA Champions League: 2013–14
- UEFA Super Cup: 2014
- FIFA Club World Cup: 2014

Bayern Munich

- DFL-Supercup: 2016
