= Stephen Jones =

Stephen Jones may refer to:

== In business ==
- Stephen Jones (milliner) (born 1957), British milliner
- Stephen Jones (attorney) (born 1940), American attorney and activist

== Arts ==
- Stephen Jones (editor) (1763–1827), English magazine editor
- Stephen Oscar Jones (1880–1967), American composer (Poppy)
- Stephen Jones (musician) (1951–2026), Australian music and video artist
- Stephen Jones (author) (born 1953), British editor and author
- Stephen Jones (Babybird) (born 1962), British musician and novelist
- Stephen Graham Jones (born 1972), American author

== Sport ==
- Stephen Jones (American football) (born 1964), American executive
- Stephen Jones (Canadian football) (born 1960), Canadian football player
- Stephen Jones (cricketer) (born 1955), South African cricketer
- Stephen Jones (hurdler) (born 1978), Barbadian Olympic hurdler
- Stephen Jones (journalist), British journalist
- Stephen Jones (rower) (born 1993), New Zealand rower
- Stephen Jones (rugby union) (born 1977), Welsh rugby union player
- Staff Jones (Stephen Thomas Jones, born 1959), Wales and British Lions rugby union player
- Stephen Jones (baseball) (born 1997), American baseball player

== Other people ==
- Stephen Jones (Australian politician) (born 1965), Australian politician
- Stephen Jones (administrator) (born 1969), president of Bob Jones University
- Stephen Jones (Wisconsin politician), American politician
- Chris Jones (Virginia politician) (Stephen Christopher Jones, born 1958), Virginia politician
- Stephen F. Jones (born 1952), American academic
- Stephen Francis Jones (born 1961), American architect
- Stephen M. Jones (born 1960), American professor of music composition at Brigham Young University

== Other uses ==
- USS Stephen R. Jones, a cargo ship that served in the United States Navy, 1918–1919

== See also ==
- Steve Jones (disambiguation)
