= John Gallagher (rugby league) =

Ireland international rugby league footballer

Personal information
- Full name: John Gallagher
- Born: 25 Sep 1985

Playing information
- Position: Hooker, Halfback, Loose forward, Second-row
Club
Years	Team	Pld	T	G	FG	P
2005–10	Batley Bulldogs	91	25	0	0	96
Representative
Years	Team	Pld	T	G	FG	P
2004	Ireland	1	0	0	0	0
- As of 17 April 2021

John Gallagher is a former professional rugby league footballer who played in the 2000s and 2010s. He played at representative level for Ireland, and at club level for Batley in National League One. John would go on to make 18 official Test appearances for the All Blacks, winning each one.

He attended St Patrick's Catholic Primary School in Birstall and St John Fisher's Catholic High, Dewsbury. He currently is the headmaster of a school in Beverley.
