= Steve G. Jones =

Hypnotherapist

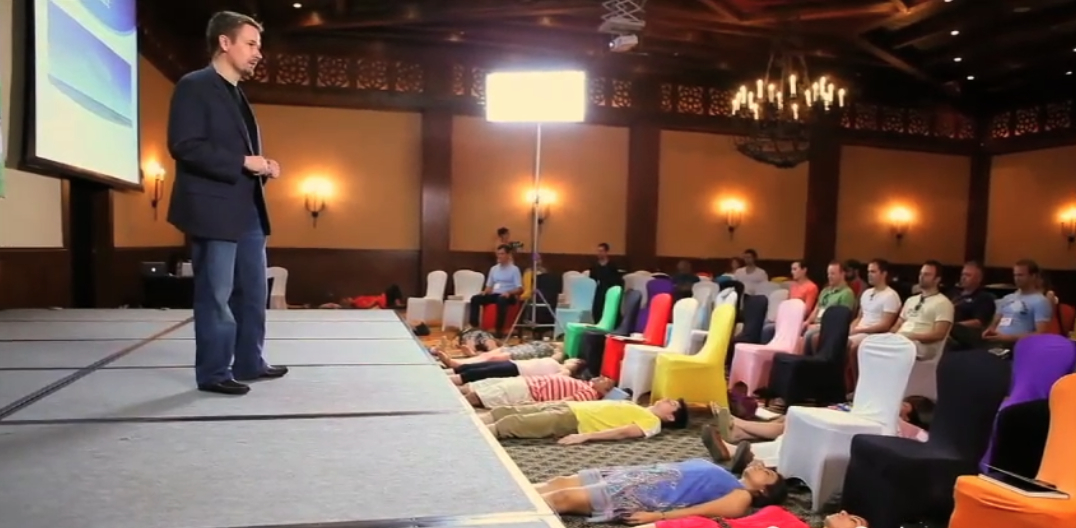
- Jones in 2010
- Education: University of Florida, Georgia Southern University
- Television: Bravo TV's "Millionaire Matchmaker," Bravo TV's "Below Deck," TruTV's "Door to the Dead"
- Website: www.SteveGJones.com

Steve G. Jones is a clinical hypnotherapist based in Savannah, Georgia. He also has offices in New York and California. He has created numerous recordings and publications about hypnosis, self-awareness and the law of attraction. He co-authored the book You Can Attract It with Frank Mangano.

== Career ==
=== Television and press appearances ===
Recent interviews include the Savannah Morning News, WTOC-TV Savannah, WAGA-TV Atlanta, and Charlotte Today. According to the Savannah Morning News article, Jones has practiced hypnotherapy since the mid-1980s while studying psychology at the University of Florida. Since that time, he has earned a master's degree in education from Armstrong Atlantic State University and a doctorate in education from Georgia Southern University.

In an interview with Forbes Magazine, Jones explained the hypnotherapy process as a tool to inspire the subconscious self to create a positive result.

Jones starred in Season Five, Episode Seven of Bravo's Millionaire Matchmaker, "Helping the Self Helpers" and appeared on Season Eight, Episode Four with Sonja Morgan and Perez Hilton. According to the show, his net worth is over four million dollars.

He also appeared on Bravo's Below Deck Season One, Episode Two, "It's Not Easy Being Green" as a Celebrity Hypnotist. Additionally, he is a featured expert on TruTV's Door to the Dead. In his casting video for the Millionaire Matchmaker, Jones states that he first became interested in hypnotherapy in high school when others came to him for help. He consults various organizations on a variety of psychological issues, including teen cyberbullying.

After working with Patti Stanger on Millionaire Matchmaker, Steve, Patti and Joe Vitale created a dating website together.

His work was parodied on the sixth episode of the third season of The Chaser's War on Everything, airing internationally through the Australian Broadcasting Company.

=== Identity theft ===
Jones suffered from identity theft, in which people impersonated him on dating websites, according to The Huffington Post. He also appeared on the Tamron Hall Show talking about the experience.
