= Steve Jones (footballer, born 1962) =

Welsh footballer

Personal information
- Full name: Stephen Anthony Jones
- Date of birth: 28 November 1962 (age 63)
- Place of birth: Wrexham, Wales
- Position: Forward

Youth career
- Wrexham

Senior career*
Years	Team	Apps	(Gls)
1981–1982	Wrexham	5	(0)
1982–1983	Crewe Alexandra	10	(1)
- Dunedin City
- * Club domestic league appearances and goals

Stephen Anthony Jones (born 28 November 1962) is a Welsh former professional footballer who played as a forward. He made appearances in the English football League for hometown club Wrexham and Crewe Alexandra. He also played in New Zealand for Dunedin City.
