= Stephen Francis Jones =

American architect

Stephen Francis Jones (born 1961) is an American architect best known for his high-end restaurant designs and for being the owner of SFJones Architects, Inc.

== Education ==
Jones obtained an undergraduate degree at University of Florida, before moving to Los Angeles, California, to earn his master of architecture at UCLA.

== Career ==
After he completed his master's degree, Jones was hired as the in-house architect at the Wolfgang Puck Food Company. In 1996, he left to start his own firm, SFJones Architects, Inc. His association with Puck continued, however, when his new firm was hired to design Puck's Spago in Beverly Hills. Jones continued to work for Puck's company's fine and casual dining branch, designing Chinois Las Vegas, the expanded dining room at Chinois' original Santa Monica location, as well as Wolfgang Puck Cafes in Canada, Kuwait and Japan.

After completing Spago, Jones designed Lucky Strike Lanes in Hollywood. Following the success of the original Lucky Strike, Jones was hired to create Lucky Strike alleys in Chicago, Toronto, Denver, St Louis, Orange County, Louisville, and South Beach. He also designed Big Al's in Vancouver, Washington; as well as Ten Pin Alley in Atlanta for Ashton Kutchner's Dolce Group.

Jones has also designed two restaurants for Mike Ovitz: Hamasaku in West Los Angeles and Kumo, a sushi restaurant, also located in Los Angeles.

Other Jones projects of note include the Hump, the sushi bar overlooking the runway at the Santa Monica Airport, the re-model of The Century Plaza Hotel in Los Angeles and its restaurant, Breeze; the Murad Inclusive Health Center in El Segundo, California; the Veggie Grill, in El Segundo, California; a re-style of the Grill on the Alley restaurants, and several of the company's Daily Grills around the US.

== Personal life ==
Jones is married to urban planner Stephanie Eyestone-Jones. They have two children.
