= Rachid Harkouk =

Footballer (born 1956)

Personal information
- Full name: Rachid Peter Harkouk
- Date of birth: 19 May 1956 (age 70)
- Place of birth: Chelsea, England
- Height: 1.87 m (6 ft 2 in)
- Position: Forward

Youth career
- Chertsey Town
- Feltham

Senior career*
Years	Team	Apps	(Gls)
1974–1975	Chertsey Town	40	(15)
1975–1976	Feltham		
1976–1978	Crystal Palace	54	(21)
1978–1980	Queens Park Rangers	20	(3)
1980–1986	Notts County	144	(40)

International career
1986	Algeria	4	(0)
- * Club domestic league appearances and goals

Rachid Peter Harkouk (born 19 May 1956) is a former professional footballer who played as a forward. Born in England, he represented the Algeria national team at international level.

== International career ==
Harkouk was born in England to an Algerian father and English mother of Welsh descent. He appeared for Algeria at the 1986 FIFA World Cup, coming on as a substitute for Rabah Madjer in their opening game against Northern Ireland. He did not feature against Brazil but was the lone striker against Spain. During that game, he sustained a knee injury that ended his career.

== Personal life ==
After his retirement from football, Harkouk became a businessman in the village of Burton Joyce. In August 2011, he was jailed for 28 months for conspiring to supply illegal drugs.

== Career statistics ==
=== Club ===
Appearances and goals by club, season and competition
Club	Season	League			National cup		League cup		Anglo-Scottish Cup		Total	
Club	Season	Division	Apps	Goals	Apps	Goals	Apps	Goals	Apps	Goals	Apps	Goals
Chertsey Town	1974–1975	Spartan League							—			
Feltham	1975–1976	Athenian League							—			
Crystal Palace	1976–1977	Third Division	28	12	3	2			—			14
Crystal Palace	1977–1978	Second Division	26	9			2	3	—			12
Crystal Palace	Total		54	21	3	2	2	3	—	—	63	26
Queens Park Rangers	1978–1979	First Division	15	3								
Queens Park Rangers	1979–1980	Second Division	5	0								
Queens Park Rangers	Total		20	3								
Notts County	1980–1981	Second Division	25	4	2	0	1	0	5	3		
Notts County	1981–1982	First Division	18	4	0	0	0	0				
Notts County	1982–1983	First Division	14	3	0	0	1	0				
Notts County	1983–1984	First Division	32	6	4	1	5	1				
Notts County	1984–1985	Second Division	35	15	2	1	4	4				20
Notts County	1985–1986	Third Division	20	7	3	3	2	0				
Notts County	Total		144	39	11	5	13	5	5	3		
Career total												

== Hat-trick ==
Date	competition	For	Against	Result	Ref.
30 October 1984	League Cup (R3)	Notts County	Bolton Wanderers	6–1	
17 November 1985	FA Cup (R1)	Notts County	Scarborough	6–1	

== Honours ==
- Anglo-Scottish Cup runner-up: 1980–81
- Second Division runner-up: 1980–81
