= Steve Jones (rugby, born 1983) =

English rugby union & league footballer

- Born: 9 January 1983 (age 42); Ashington, Northumberland, England

Rugby union career
- Position(s): Centre
Senior career
Years	Team	Apps	(Points)
	Newcastle Falcons		()
2006–07	Border Reivers		()
2007–09	Newcastle Falcons		()
2009–10	Edinburgh		()
2010	Exeter Chiefs		()
- Rugby league career

Playing information
- Position: Centre
Club
Years	Team	Pld	T	G	FG	P
2005	Featherstone Rovers	4	0	0	0	0
2005	Huddersfield Giants	1	0	0	0	0
2005–06	Batley Bulldogs	26	5	54	0	128
	Total	31	5	54	0	128

Steve Jones (born 9 January 1983) is a former professional rugby league and rugby union footballer who played in the 2000s. In rugby union, he played for Newcastle Falcons, Border Reivers, Edinburgh and Exeter Chiefs, and also played for the Scotland A team at international level. In rugby league, he played at club level for Featherstone Rovers, Huddersfield Giants, and Batley Bulldogs, as a centre.

== Playing career ==
Born in Ashington, Northumberland, Jones started his career in rugby union with Newcastle Falcons, spending three seasons in the Academy team while studying for a degree at Northumbria University. In 2005, he switched codes to rugby league after being offered a trial by Super League club Huddersfield Giants. He spent a month on loan at National League One side Featherstone Rovers, making his debut in April 2005. After another National League loan spell with Batley Bulldogs, he was released by Huddersfield at the end of the season.

He returned to rugby union with Scottish club Border Reivers before re-joining Newcastle Falcons in 2007. In 2009, he joined Edinburgh, then moved to Exeter Chiefs the following year.

While at Newcastle, Jones represented Scotland A at international level in 2009.
