= Steve Jones (footballer, born 1964) =

Welsh footballer

Personal information
- Full name: Steven Wynn Jones
- Date of birth: 23 October 1964 (age 62)
- Place of birth: Wrexham, Wales
- Position: Left-back

Youth career
- Wrexham

Senior career*
Years	Team	Apps	(Gls)
1982–1984	Wrexham	10	(1)
- Runcorn
- * Club domestic league appearances and goals

Steven Wynn Jones (born 23 October 1964) is a Welsh former professional footballer who played as a left-back. He made appearances in the English Football League for Wrexham. He also played for Runcorn.
