= Steve Adams (footballer, born 1958) =

English footballer

Personal information
- Full name: Stephen Thomas Adams
- Date of birth: 18 June 1958 (age 68)
- Place of birth: Windsor, England
- Position: Midfielder

Youth career
- 1975–1976: Queens Park Rangers

Senior career*
Years	Team	Apps	(Gls)
1976–1977	Queens Park Rangers	0	(0)
1977–1978	Millwall	1	(0)
1978–1979	Cambridge United	3	(0)
1979–1980	Hillingdon Borough	?	(?)
- * Club domestic league appearances and goals

Stephen Thomas Adams (born 18 June 1958) is an English former professional footballer who played in the Football League as a midfielder.
