= Dave Thomas (footballer, born 1950) =

English footballer (born 1950)

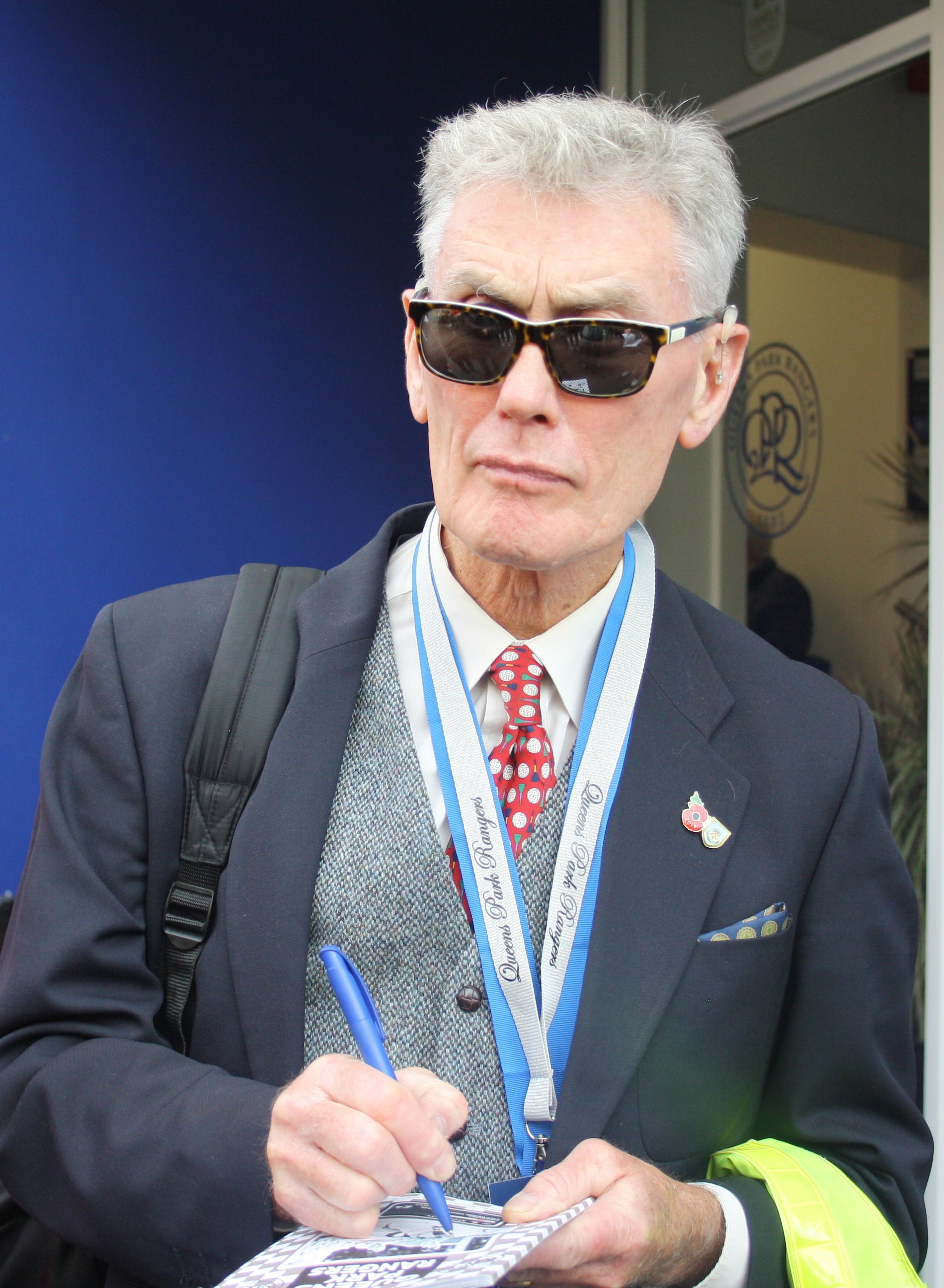
- Dave Thomas in 2025.

Personal information
- Full name: David Thomas
- Date of birth: 5 October 1950 (age 76)
- Place of birth: Kirkby-in-Ashfield, England
- Height: 5 ft 8 in (1.73 m)
- Position: Winger

Senior career*
Years	Team	Apps	(Gls)
1966–1972	Burnley	157	(15)
1972–1977	Queens Park Rangers	182	(29)
1977–1979	Everton	71	(4)
1979–1981	Wolves	10	(0)
1981	Vancouver Whitecaps	16	(2)
1981–1982	Middlesbrough	13	(1)
1982–1984	Portsmouth	30	(1)

International career
1966	England Schoolboys	4	(1)
1968–1969	England Youth	8	(0)
1970–1974	England U23	10	(0)
1974–1975	England	8	(0)
- * Club domestic league appearances and goals

Dave Thomas (born 5 October 1950) is an English former professional footballer who played as a winger, totalling over 450 league appearances for Burnley, Queens Park Rangers, Everton, Vancouver Whitecaps, Middlesbrough, Portsmouth and Wolverhampton Wanderers over almost 20 years. He made eight appearances for the England national team.

== Club career ==
Thomas made his senior debut in Burnley's 8–1 defeat to West Bromwich Albion in the 1966–67 season.

Thomas's most successful season was undoubtedly 1975–76 while playing for Queens Park Rangers. QPR led the First Division for much of the season, narrowly missing out by one point to Liverpool after the final game of the season. Thomas was a pivotal figure in the team, providing Stan Bowles, Gerry Francis and others with outstanding service from the wing.

Following his transfer to Everton, Thomas continued to enjoy success in the 1977–78 season while playing for Everton. Everton's top marksman Bob Latchford scored 30 goals in the league that season, Thomas providing more of his goals than anybody else with some more accurate crosses. His transfer in October 1972 from Burnley to QPR for £165,000 was a then record fee for a Second Division club. In 1981, Thomas played a single summer season with the Vancouver Whitecaps in the North American Soccer League.

== International career ==
He won eight England caps overall whilst at Queens Park Rangers. His first England cap was given to him by manager Don Revie on 30 October 1974 in a 3–0 win against Czechoslovakia. He set up the first goal in the game. In England's April 1975 European Championship qualifier against Cyprus, Thomas came on as a substitute and made both of England's remaining two goals in their 5–0 victory; his cross for the first of those two goals was his first touch of the game.

== Style of play ==
A skillful and fast player, it was common for him to play without shinpads.

== Honours ==
Portsmouth

- Football League Third Division: 1982–83
