= Steve Jones (footballer, born 1957) =

English footballer

Personal information
- Full name: Stephen Russell Jones
- Date of birth: 25 July 1957 (age 69)
- Place of birth: Eastbourne, England
- Position: Defender

Youth career
- 1972–1973: Queens Park Rangers

Senior career*
Years	Team	Apps	(Gls)
1973–1978	Queens Park Rangers	0	(0)
1979–1979	Walsall	15	(0)
1979–1983	Wimbledon	79	(0)
Total		94	(0)
- * Club domestic league appearances and goals

Stephen Jones (born July 1957) an English former professional footballer who played in the Football League as a right or left back or in central defence.

Steve was born in Eastbourne and played as a junior for Eastbourne United FC.

Jones left Hailsham County Secondary School aged 15 to join Queens Park Rangers as an apprentice professional footballer in June 1972.

He made his first team debut (at left back) aged just 16 in a friendly match against the Jamaica national team in Kingston, Jamaica (May 1973).

Steve signed full professional forms for QPR managed by Gordon Jago aged 17 but failed to represent the First XI following the managerial appointment of former Chelsea boss, Dave Sexton.

Following 180 appearances played over six years for the QPR reserves he was destined for Atlanta Chiefs (State of Georgia, USA) before eventually moving to Walsall to be acquainted once again with former QPR reserve team coach Frank Sibley in January 1979, for reported £30,000 fee. With Walsall relegated, within a few months, Jones returned to London signing for Wimbledon who had just been promoted to Football League Division Three.

During the Division Three league match in 1982 between Wimbledon and Plymouth Argyle, Jones sustained a serious knee injury and was eventually forced to retire from the game in March 1983, aged 26.
