= Peter Eastoe =

English footballer (born 1953)

Personal information
- Full name: Peter Robert Eastoe
- Date of birth: 2 August 1953 (age 73)
- Place of birth: Dordon, Tamworth, England
- Position: Striker

Senior career*
Years	Team	Apps	(Gls)
1971–1973	Wolverhampton Wanderers	6	(0)
1973–1974	→ Swindon Town (loan)	11	(7)
1974–1976	Swindon Town	80	(36)
1976–1979	Queens Park Rangers	72	(15)
1979–1982	Everton	95	(26)
1982–1985	West Bromwich Albion	31	(8)
1983	→ Leicester City (loan)	5	(1)
1983	→ Huddersfield Town (loan)	10	(0)
1984	→ Walsall (loan)	6	(1)
1984	→ Leicester City (loan)	6	(1)
1985	→ Wolverhampton Wanderers (loan)	8	(0)
1985–1987	Farense	20	(1)
1987–198?	Louletano		
- Atherstone United
Total		350	(96)

International career
1971–1972	England Youth	8	(4)

Managerial career
- Nuneaton Borough
- 1991–????: Alvechurch
- * Club domestic league appearances and goals

Peter Robert Eastoe (born 2 August 1953) is an English former footballer.

== Career ==
Eastoe signed schoolboy forms with Wolverhampton Wanderers in the late 1960s. Unable to break into the Wolves first team, the former English youth international joined Swindon Town in March 1974 for a club record fee of £88,000 – after a successful loan spell which saw him average a goal every other game, including a brace on his debut.

Though Eastoe's goals were not enough to maintain their Division Two status, in Division Three he notched 31 goals as Swindon challenged for promotion, elevating Eastoe to hero status at the County Ground. The club ultimately fell short of promotion but Eastoe's goals had alerted the attention of the bigger clubs.

The striker was signed by Queens Park Rangers in March 1976 for £100,000 (with Don Rogers returning to Swindon as part of the deal). He did not play in the remainder of that season, which saw QPR go close to winning the league championship, but found himself in the team over the next three seasons.

He was transferred to Everton in March 1979 – shortly before Rangers dropped out of Division One – in a straight swap for Mickey Walsh. After three full seasons at Goodison Park including Season top scorer in 1980-81 with 19 goals, he joined West Bromwich Albion in August 1982, where he had a full season in 1982–83.

Following this campaign, he was out of the club's plans and spent periods on loan at Leicester City, Huddersfield Town, Walsall and Wolverhampton Wanderers, respectively. During the twilight of his career he played in the Portuguese league at Farense and Louletano, and returned to England with non-league Atherstone United.

His managerial career included a spell with Nuneaton Borough, before he was appointed player-manager of Alvechurch in 1991.

== Career statistics ==
Appearances and goals by club, season and competition
Club	Season	League		
Club	Season	App	Goals	Division
Wolverhampton Wanderers	1971–72	Division 1	3	0
Wolverhampton Wanderers	1972–73	Division 1	2	0
Wolverhampton Wanderers	1973–74	Division 1	1	0
Swindon Town	1973–74	Division 2	19	8
Swindon Town	1974–75	Division 3	46	26
Swindon Town	1975–76	Division 3	26	9
Queens Park Rangers	1975–76	Division 1	0	0
Queens Park Rangers	1976–77	Division 1	27	6
Queens Park Rangers	1977–78	Division 1	19	6
Queens Park Rangers	1978–79	Division 1	26	3
Everton	1978–79	Division 1	8	0
Everton	1979–80	Division 1	26	6
Everton	1980–81	Division 1	42	15
Everton	1981–82	Division 1	19	5
West Bromwich Albion	1982–83	Division 1	31	8
