= Don Shanks (footballer) =

English footballer

Personal information
- Date of birth: 2 October 1952 (age 74)
- Place of birth: Hammersmith, England
- Height: 5 ft 11 in (1.80 m)
- Position: Full back

Youth career
- Fulham

Senior career*
Years	Team	Apps	(Gls)
1970–1974	Luton Town	90	(2)
1974–1981	Queens Park Rangers	180	(10)
1981–1983	Brighton & Hove Albion	46	(0)
1983	Eastern Athletic		
1984	Wimbledon	1	(0)
–	Wealdstone		

International career
1971	England Youth	7	(1)

Managerial career
- 2021 —: Makadi F.C.
- * Club domestic league appearances and goals

Don Shanks (born 2 October 1952) is an English professional football manager and former footballer who manages Egyptian fourth division team Makadi F.C. He played in the Football League as a full back for Luton Town, Queens Park Rangers, Brighton & Hove Albion and Wimbledon, before moving into non-league football with Wealdstone.

Shanks began his football career as a junior at Fulham, but moved on to Luton Town without appearing in Fulham's first team. He joined QPR in November 1974 and made his debut against Burnley in December 1974. He eventually played 180 league games for QPR, scoring 10 times, before transferring to Brighton in 1981, and playing one game on a non-contract basis for Wimbledon.

He is also known for being Stan Bowles' gambling partner and for dating Mary Stavin, the 1977 Miss World.
