= Tommy Cunningham (footballer) =

English footballer

Personal information
- Full name: Thomas Edward Cunningham
- Date of birth: 7 October 1955 (age 71)
- Place of birth: Bethnal Green, England
- Height: 6 ft 1 in (1.85 m)
- Position: Defender

Senior career*
Years	Team	Apps	(Gls)
1974–1975	Chelsea	0	(0)
1975–1979	Queens Park Rangers	30	(2)
1979–1981	Wimbledon	99	(12)
1981–1987	Orient	165	(17)
1987–1988	Fisher Athletic	18	(0)
- * Club domestic league appearances and goals

Thomas Edward Cunningham (born 7 December 1955) is an English former professional footballer who made nearly 300 appearances in the Football League playing as a defender for Queens Park Rangers, Wimbledon and Orient.
