= Derek Richardson (footballer) =

English footballer

Personal information
- Date of birth: 13 July 1956 (age 70)
- Place of birth: Hackney, England
- Position: Goalkeeper

Youth career
- Chelsea

Senior career*
Years	Team	Apps	(Gls)
1974–1976	Chelsea	0	(0)
1976–1979	Queens Park Rangers	31	(0)
1979–1982	Sheffield United	42	(0)
1982	Coventry City	0	(0)
- Maidstone United
- Welling United
- Fisher Athletic
Total		73	(0)

International career
- England youth
1986	England Semi-Pro	2	(0)
- * Club domestic league appearances and goals

Derek Richardson (born 13 July 1956) is an English former professional footballer who played as goalkeeper.

== Career ==
Born in Hackney, Richardson played professionally for Chelsea, Queens Park Rangers, Sheffield United, and Coventry City, making a total of 73 appearances in the Football League. He later played non-League football with Maidstone United, Welling United and Fisher Athletic, before becoming a London taxi driver.

He also played at international level for England at youth and semi-professional levels.

In 1979, he played in a benefit match for West Bromwich Albion player Len Cantello, that saw a team of white players play against a team of black players.

In December 2016, amid the United Kingdom football sexual abuse scandal, Richardson became the third former Chelsea player to allege abuse by former chief scout Eddie Heath.

== Personal life ==
Richardson was born in England to a Jamaican father and English mother.
