= Don Masson =

Scottish footballer (born 1946)

Personal information
- Full name: Donald Sanderson Masson
- Date of birth: 26 August 1946 (age 80)
- Place of birth: Banchory, Aberdeenshire, Scotland
- Height: 5 ft 8 in (1.73 m)
- Position: Midfielder

Senior career*
Years	Team	Apps	(Gls)
1964–1968	Middlesbrough	53	(6)
1968–1974	Notts County	274	(81)
1974–1977	Queens Park Rangers	116	(18)
1977–1978	Derby County	23	(1)
1978–1982	Notts County	129	(11)
1981	→ Minnesota Kicks (loan)	24	(2)
1982–1983	Bulova	?	(?)
1983–1984	Kettering Town	6	(1)
Total		485	(120)

International career
1976–1978	Scotland	17	(5)
- * Club domestic league appearances and goals

Donald Sanderson Masson (born 26 August 1946) is a Scottish former footballer. A midfielder, Masson began his career with Middlesbrough in 1964. He stayed there for six years before moving to Queens Park Rangers, followed by Derby County and Notts County, then player-manager of Kettering Town, before he retired.

Masson was voted Notts best player of all time by supporters. He played 17 caps for Scotland, including winning the British Home International Championship in 1976 and playing in the 1978 World Cup. After his retirement, Masson went into the hotel business with his wife.

== Club career ==
Masson began his career with Middlesbrough in 1964. He was signed by Notts County manager Billy Gray in 1968 in a joint deal for £7000 along with Bob Worthington. He stayed there for six years before moving to Queens Park Rangers in December 1974 for £100,000. Masson made his debut in the 1–0 home win versus Sheffield United on 14 December 1974.

Although approaching 29 years of age before he played top-level football, his was a signing that underlined the quality of then manager Dave Sexton's judgement. A stylish and creative midfielder, he came to be seen as the final piece in the jigsaw of an exciting and attacking QPR team. The following 1975/76 season saw QPR come close to winning the League title, being pipped by a point by Liverpool.

After three years at Loftus Road he moved to Derby County in October 1977 in exchange for Leighton James. After a further spell at Notts County he played for a time in the United States. Don was voted Notts best player of all time by Notts County supporters and also has a lounge at Meadow Lane named in his honour. On returning to England he became the player-manager of Kettering Town, before retiring from the game.

== International career ==
Masson won 17 caps for Scotland. He scored five goals including Scotland's first goal in the 2–1 victory over England in 1976 which clinched their first British Home International Championship since 1967. He missed a penalty kick in the 3–1 defeat against Peru in the 1978 World Cup.

== Retirement ==
In retirement he turned his hand in to the hotel business, having bought The Gallery at Trent Bridge, Nottingham, which he later sold. He and his wife now run The Grange, a guest house in Elton on the Hill.

== Career statistics ==
=== International ===
Appearances and goals by national team and year
National team	Year	Apps	Goals
Scotland	1976	5	3
Scotland	1977	9	2
Scotland	1978	3	0
Total		17	5

Scores and results list Scotland's goal tally first, score column indicates score after each Masson goal.

List of international goals scored by Don Masson
No.	Date	Venue	Opponent	Score	Result	Competition	Ref.
1	8 May 1976	Hampden Park, Glasgow, Scotland	Northern Ireland	2–0	3–0	1975–76 British Home Championship	
2	15 May 1976	Hampden Park, Glasgow, Scotland	England	1–1	2–1	1975–76 British Home Championship	
3	8 September 1976	Hampden Park, Glasgow, Scotland	Finland	2–0	6–0	Friendly	
4	18 June 1977	Boca Juniors Stadium, Buenos Aires, Argentina	Argentina	1–0	1–1	Friendly	
5	12 October 1977	Anfield, Liverpool, England	Wales	1–0	2–0	1978 FIFA World Cup qualification	

== See also ==
- List of Scotland national football team captains
