= Ian Gillard =

English footballer

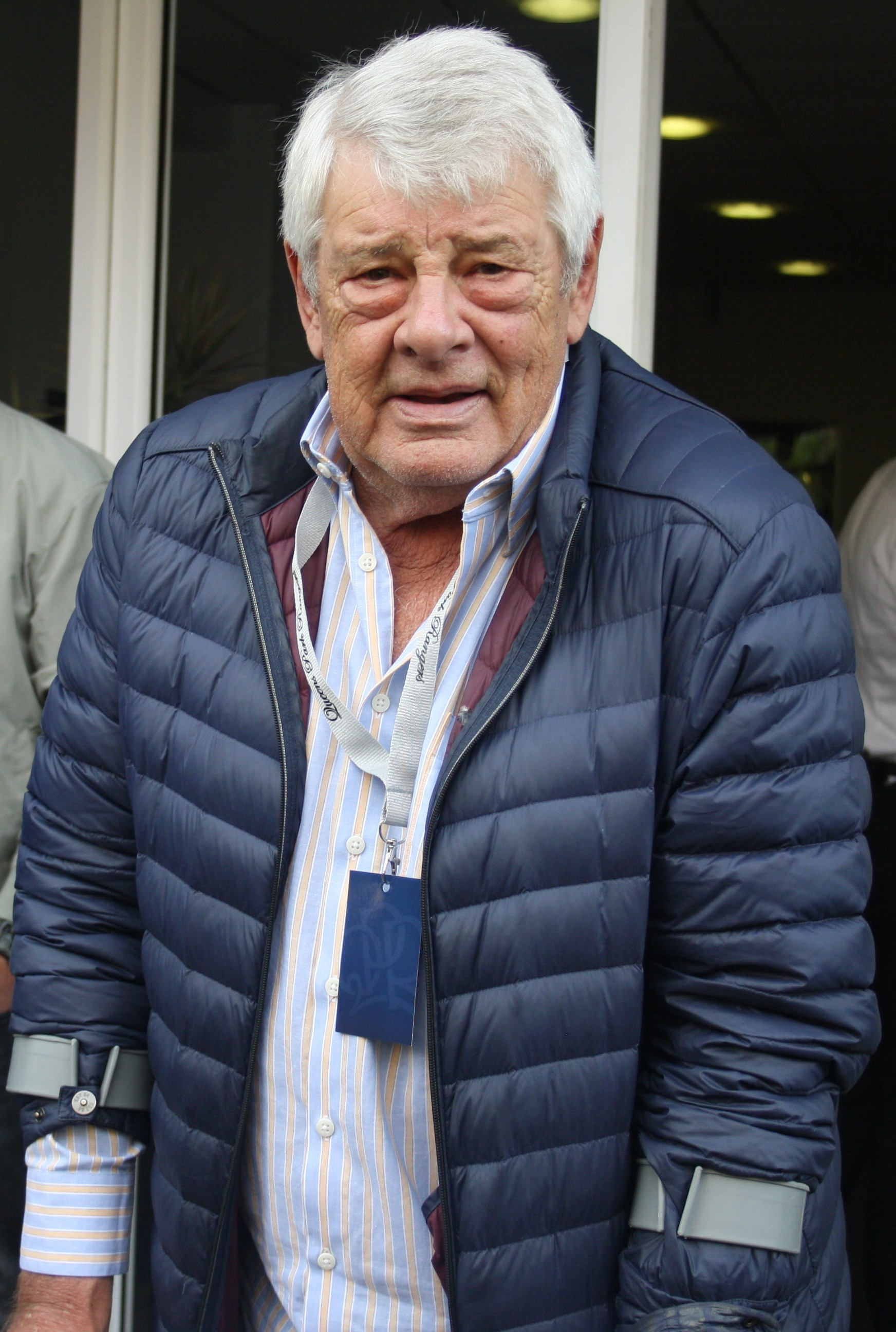
- Ian Gillard in 2025

Personal information
- Full name: Ian Terry Gillard
- Date of birth: 9 October 1950 (age 76)
- Place of birth: Hammersmith, London, England
- Height: 6 ft 1 3/4 in (1.87 m)
- Position: Defender

Youth career
- Tottenham Hotspur

Senior career*
| Years | Team | Apps | (Gls) |
| 1968–1982 | Queens Park Rangers | 408 | (9) |
| 1982–1986 | Aldershot | 83 | (2) |
| Total | | 491 | (11) |

International career
| 1974 | England U23 | 4 | (1) |
| 1975 | England | 3 | (0) |
- * Club domestic league appearances and goals

Ian Terry Gillard (born 9 October 1950) is an English former professional footballer who made nearly 500 appearances in the Football League playing for Queens Park Rangers, where he spent the majority of his career, and for Aldershot. He won three caps for the England national team.

Gillard started out at Tottenham Hotspur in the youth ranks before moving to West London and QPR where he made his debut in November 1968. Over the next fourteen years he made the left-back position virtually his own forming a formidable full-back partnership with Dave Clement for many seasons. He was an integral member of the 1975–76 team that almost won the First Division title, eventually finishing as runners-up to Liverpool.

His last game for QPR was in the FA Cup final replay against Tottenham Hotspur in 1982. He then moved on a free transfer to Aldershot taking up a position as player coach. He played 408 league games (485 in all competitions, which is the third highest in the club's history) and scored a total of 11 goals. Gillard won 3 international caps for England in 1975.

== Honours ==
Queens Park Rangers

- FA Cup runner-up: 1981–82
