= Stan Bowles =

English footballer (1948–2024)

Personal information
- Full name: Stanley Bowles
- Date of birth: 24 December 1948
- Place of birth: Collyhurst, England
- Date of death: 24 February 2024 (aged 75)
- Place of death: Manchester, England
- Height: 5 ft 10 in (1.78 m)
- Positions: Forward; midfielder

Senior career*
Years	Team	Apps	(Gls)
1967–1970	Manchester City	17	(2)
1970	Bury	5	(0)
1970–1971	Crewe Alexandra	51	(18)
1971–1972	Carlisle United	33	(12)
1972–1979	Queens Park Rangers	255	(70)
1979–1980	Nottingham Forest	19	(2)
1980–1981	Leyton Orient	46	(7)
1981–1983	Brentford	73	(16)
1983–1984	Brentford	8	(0)
- Epping Town
Total		507	(127)

International career
1974–1977	England	5	(1)
- * Club domestic league appearances and goals

Stanley Bowles (24 December 1948 – 24 February 2024) was an English professional footballer who played as a forward. Known for his skills as a player in the 1970s and 1980s, he also gained a reputation as one of the game's great non-conformists and mavericks. He played 315 games for Queens Park Rangers, and earned five England caps.

== Club career ==
=== Early career ===
Born in Collyhurst, Manchester, Lancashire, he began his career as an apprentice at Manchester City, scoring twice in each of his first two games. He was then left out of the side for the next game and reinstated for the following two games without scoring. Bowles was then kept out of the side following the arrival of Francis Lee. He played only one more game during the 1967–68 season, as City won the league title under manager Joe Mercer. He had off-field problems and was considered to have a lax attitude to training, Bowles then had a disagreement with coach Malcolm Allison in a Manchester nightclub. Subsequently, he only played one full League match during the 1968–69 season. He played for City 11 more times in League and Cup during his final season there, the 1969–70 season, without scoring, and was then released after a series of off-field incidents.

After a brief and unsuccessful stay at Bury, he was signed by Ernie Tagg, manager of Crewe Alexandra, then in the Fourth Division. Signed by Tagg on a month's trial, Bowles agreed a two-year contract less than two weeks later; Bowles later said Tagg was a "father figure" who helped him rediscover his touch and appetite for the game.

Tagg is often quoted in respect of Bowles' gambling problems. He used to give the player's wages direct to his wife, saying: "If he could pass a bookie's as well as he passes a football, he'd be a very rich man." Tagg managed a Crewe pub, The Vine. Bowles said:

It was Ernie Tagg who made that crack about my ability to pass a betting shop. It was a bit rich, coming from him. Ernie had a pub [The Vine], and I remember him staying there for a darts match instead of watching a game once. At least I used to turn up!

With 18 goals in 51 league games for Crewe, Bowles' skill caught the eye of a number of bigger clubs. In October 1971, he was signed by Carlisle United, at the time a Second Division club, for a fee of £12,000, well under Crewe's £25,000 valuation. He scored 12 goals in 33 league appearances for the club, including a hat-trick in a 3–0 win over league leaders Norwich City at Brunton Park. He was in the Carlisle side that beat Italian giants AS Roma 3–2 in the Stadio Olimpico in 1972, infuriating the home side by performing keepie uppies on the halfway line.

=== Queens Park Rangers ===
Bowles was sold to Queens Park Rangers for £112,000 in September 1972, after impressing manager Gordon Jago in QPR's penultimate home game of the 1971–72 season, a 3–0 home defeat of Carlisle United. He replaced Rodney Marsh, who had been transferred to Bowles' first club Manchester City six months earlier. Bowles took over Marsh's number 10 shirt, which other players had been reluctant to wear in fear of being compared unfavourably to the mercurial Marsh. Bowles had no such qualms about taking the shirt, and joked that, having come from the north, he had never really heard of Marsh.

Bowles was often regarded as something of a character both on and off the pitch. He was known to cite a notable incident in his playing days involving the FA Cup trophy. Having won the FA Cup final four days prior, the Sunderland team were parading the trophy at Roker Park on 9 May 1973, when they met QPR in the Second Division. The trophy had been placed on a table at the side of the pitch when Bowles tore straight across the park and claims to have kicked the ball at it full speed, sending the Cup flying through the air. According to Bowles' own account, the crowd predictably went ballistic, but he had the last laugh by scoring two goals in the match which ended in a pitch invasion; Bowles said: "There were a couple of us who had a bet on who could knock it off the table with the ball first". However, his version of events has been disputed; according to Jago (QPR's manager at the time), it was Bowles' teammate, defender Tony Hazell, who struck the cup with an accidental clearance.

Bowles spent just over seven years at QPR, playing a central role in the team that finished as league runners-up in 1975–76 season under Dave Sexton.

In the 1976–77 season, having finished as league runners-up, QPR played in European competition for the first time. During this campaign, Bowles broke the record for goals scored by a British player in a European campaign with 11 goals including two hat-tricks against Brann Bergen from Norway and two goals against Slovan Bratislava, a side which featured many of the Czech team that had won the European Championships in Yugoslavia only months earlier. The 3–3 draw against Bratislava on 20 October 1976, is regarded by many as the club's greatest away performance.

In 1979, Bowles fell out with QPR's new manager, Tommy Docherty. Bowles responded to Docherty's plea of "You can trust me, Stan" with "I'd rather trust my chickens with Colonel Sanders". Docherty made Bowles train with the reserves for nearly six months, before selling Bowles to Nottingham Forest in December 1979.

A 2014 fans poll saw Bowles voted the club's all-time greatest player. In 2022, the Ellerslie Road Stand at QPR's ground, Loftus Road was renamed the Stanley Bowles Stand.

=== Nottingham Forest ===
Part of the side which won the two-legged, 1979 European Super Cup against Barcelona in February 1980, Bowles failed to settle at Nottingham Forest under the management of Brian Clough, and he ruled himself out of the 1980 European Cup final, after Clough refused to allow Bowles to play in John Robertson's testimonial. Bowles was essentially understudy to the UK's first £1 million signing Trevor Francis during his one season at the City Ground.

=== Leyton Orient ===
Bowles was then sold to Leyton Orient for £90,000 after making only 23 appearances in all competitions. As part of ambitious plans by manager Jimmy Bloomfield, Bowles was signed alongside record signing Peter Taylor bought for a club record fee of £150,000 from Tottenham Hotspur. Neither were a success and once John Chiedozie was sold, Bloomfield resigned and Bowles was sold.

=== Brentford ===
He joined Brentford the following year. Persuaded to sign following a cash payment of £4,000, Bowles took the money to White City Greyhounds losing most of it to the bookmakers at the track. Picked regularly by manager, Fred Callaghan, he featured throughout the 1981–82 and 1982–83 seasons in a midfield trio alongside Chris Kamara and Terry Hurlock. He chose to retire at the end of the 1982–83 season after the club finished 18 points short of automatic promotion. Bowles came out of retirement to briefly rejoin the club on a non-contract basis during 1983–84 season, before retiring again in February 1984. He received a testimonial in 1987, earning £17,000.

After retirement from the professional game, he continued to play at non-league level for Epping Town.

== International career ==
Bowles made his international debut against Portugal in Lisbon in April 1974 in Alf Ramsey's last match in charge. He won five caps for England, all while playing for Queens Park Rangers (playing for three managers: Ramsey, Joe Mercer and Don Revie) and scored his only international goal in a 2–0 win over Wales at Ninian Park in 1974. He made his final England appearance in February 1977, in a friendly against the Netherlands at Wembley.

== Personal life ==
Bowles was a prolific gambler and ended his career with significant gambling debts. It is estimated that he lost an estimated £750,000 to gambling in the course of his career. Bowles' 1996 autobiography revealed the extent of his drinking, womanising and gambling during his playing days, and also helped to secure a role as a pundit on Sky Sports. He was also the life chairman of the Queens Park Rangers LSA (Loyal Supporters Association).

A cult icon, a song bearing his name was released as a single by the group The Others. Bowles also wrote betting columns in the national press and a column in lads' mag Loaded, and also appeared on the after-dinner-speaker circuit.

On 20 June 2015, Bowles was reported to be suffering from Alzheimer's disease. On 22 August, Queens Park Rangers honoured Bowles as he was presented to the crowd at Loftus Road before their game against Rotherham United. In July 2017, QPR arranged a testimonial game for Bowles, this time against AFC Bournemouth. Additionally, the club retired the number 10 for the season, the number worn by Bowles during his time with QPR.

Bowles died on 24 February 2024, at the age of 75. He was survived by his second wife, Diane Bushell, and by children Andria, Carl and Tracy, from his first marriage, to Ann. Bowles was a cousin of footballer Paul Bowles (also a Crewe player, though Stan said he'd never met him).

== Honours ==
Manchester City

- Football League First Division: 1967–68

Queens Park Rangers

- Bruges Matins: 1977

Nottingham Forest

- European Cup: 1979–80
- UEFA Super Cup: 1979

Individual

- UEFA Cup Top Scorer: 1976–77
- Brentford Supporters' Player of the Year: 1981–82
