= Ron Abbott =

English footballer

Personal information
- Full name: Ronald Frederick Abbott
- Date of birth: 2 August 1953 (age 73)
- Place of birth: Lambeth, England
- Position: Defender

Senior career*
Years	Team	Apps	(Gls)
1971–1979	Queens Park Rangers	46	(4)
- Drogheda United
- Fisher Athletic
- * Club domestic league appearances and goals

Ronald Frederick Abbott (born 2 August 1953) is an English former professional footballer who played in the Football League as a defender for Queens Park Rangers. He later played for Irish club Drogheda United and in English non-league football for Fisher Athletic.
