= Don Givens =

Irish footballer (born 1949)

Personal information
- Full name: Daniel Joseph Givens
- Date of birth: 9 August 1949 (age 77)
- Place of birth: Limerick, Ireland
- Height: 5 ft 11 in (1.80 m)
- Position: Forward

Youth career
- 1966–1969: Manchester United

Senior career*
Years	Team	Apps	(Gls)
1969–1970	Manchester United	8	(1)
1970–1972	Luton Town	83	(19)
1972–1978	Queens Park Rangers	242	(76)
1978–1981	Birmingham City	59	(10)
1979–1980	→ AFC Bournemouth (loan)	5	(4)
1980–1981	Sheffield United	11	(3)
1981–1987	Neuchâtel Xamax	149	(34)
Total		457	(147)

International career
1969–1981	Republic of Ireland	56	(19)

Managerial career
- 1993–1997: Neuchâtel Xamax (youth coach/coach)
- 1997–2000: Arsenal (youth coach)
- 2000–2010: Republic of Ireland U21
- 2002: Republic of Ireland (caretaker)
- 2007–2008: Republic of Ireland (caretaker)
- * Club domestic league appearances and goals

Daniel Joseph "Don" Givens (born 9 August 1949) is an Irish former footballer and coach. A forward, Givens played club football for Manchester United, Luton Town, Queens Park Rangers, Birmingham City, AFC Bournemouth, Sheffield United and Neuchâtel Xamax, and was capped 56 times for the Republic of Ireland. His 19 senior international goals was a national record for several years. He went on to coach at Xamax and Arsenal, and spent ten years as manager of the Republic of Ireland U21 team.

== Club career ==
Playing as a centre forward, Givens started his career at Manchester United in 1968. He made his scoring debut against Shamrock Rovers in May 1969 but he played just eight more games before moving to Luton Town. He then transferred to Queens Park Rangers in 1972. He helped the club win promotion to the First Division in his first season, scoring 23 times. The next few years would see him reach his peak, scoring a combined 49 goals in four seasons and helping QPR not just hold onto their top-flight status but contend for the league title. After an unsuccessful season in 1977–78, scoring just four goals in 37 appearances, he parted ways with QPR. He made a total of 243 appearances and scored 76 goals for the Hoops. Given went on to transfer to Birmingham City in the summer of 1978. At Birmingham he helped see the club be promoted to the First Division in the 1979–80 season. While there he also had a month-long loan spell in March 1980 at AFC Bournemouth. Givens moved on to Sheffield United a year later. His time at Sheffield United will forever be remembered for the time he missed a last-minute penalty which no other Sheffield United player wanted to take in the last match of the 1980–81 season against Walsall at Bramall Lane in the Third Division. If he had scored, The Saddlers would have been relegated, instead it was Sheffield United who were consigned to the Fourth Division for the first time in their history.

In 1981, escaping the negativity of his time at Sheffield United, Givens moved to Switzerland to play for Neuchâtel Xamax. In the 1981–82 UEFA Cup Givens scored at Hamburger SV in a quarter-final tie. He had the honour of leading Neuchâtel to their first Swiss National League A championship in the 1986–87 season. He made 144 appearances in all for Xamax, scoring 34 goals. Givens brought an end to his playing days soon afterwards.

== International career ==
The 1976 European Championship qualifiers pitted Ireland against the Soviet Union again, along with Turkey and Switzerland. The winner of this group would have to play-off against the winner of another group to determine the qualifier. This might have seemed a bridge too far but it would prove to be Givens finest moment in a green shirt as he scored a hat-trick against the USSR to give Ireland a 3–0 win in the opening game and a fighting chance of making that play-off. He scored again in a 1–1 draw against Turkey in Izmir. Ireland had peaked too early in the group though, and after a 2–1 loss to the Soviet Union in Kyiv and a 1–0 defeat at the hands of Switzerland in Berne, Ireland last match against Turkey was not expected to mean anything, since the Soviets were already a point ahead with a game in hand. Even a win meant that the Soviet Union would need only two points in their final two games to finish on top. Ireland won the game 4–0, with Givens scoring all four goals, the first and only time an Irish player has done this. But it was not enough and the Soviet Union went on to top the group.

In the 1978 World Cup qualifiers, Ireland was paired with France again, and Bulgaria. Ireland beat France 1–0 in their new home stadium, Lansdowne Road, but lost 2–0 in Paris. Givens scored in Sofia, but it was a consolation as Ireland lost 2–1 and subsequently went out of the World Cup places with a 0–0 draw in the final game against Bulgaria at Lansdowne Road.

For the 1980 European Championships, Ireland were drawn in a Group alongside England, Northern Ireland, Bulgaria and Denmark. It was a disappointing campaign for Givens, who, despite scoring against Denmark, was unable to make an impact in a group where Ireland would manage just two wins from eight games.

Altogether Givens made 56 appearances for the senior team between 1969 and 1982, scoring 19 goals, including a record four goal haul against Turkey, and becoming his country's leading goalscorer for a period. He currently ranks as the joint fourth all time goalscorer for the Irish.

== Coaching career ==
During 1993, Givens took up the role of a coach at Swiss side Xamax. Four years later he joined up with Arsenal to coach at the club's academy. Givens went on to manage the Republic of Ireland U21 team from 2000 until 2010 when he stepped down.

== Honours ==
Neuchâtel Xamax

- Swiss Super League: 1986–87

== Sources ==
- The Book of Irish Goalscorers by Seán Ryan & Stephen Burke 1987
