= Martyn Busby =

English footballer

Personal information
- Full name: Martyn George Busby
- Date of birth: 24 March 1953 (age 73)
- Place of birth: High Wycombe, England
- Height: 6 ft 2 in (1.88 m)
- Position: Midfielder

Senior career*
Years	Team	Apps	(Gls)
1970–1976	Queens Park Rangers	79	(6)
1975–1976	→ Portsmouth (loan)	6	(1)
1976–1977	Notts County	37	(4)
1977–1981	Queens Park Rangers	66	(11)
1980	→ Burnley (loan)	4	(1)
Total		192	(23)

International career
1971	England Youth	6	(0)

Managerial career
- 1996–1997: Maidenhead United
- * Club domestic league appearances and goals

Martyn George Busby (born 24 March 1953) is an English former professional football midfielder who played mainly with Queens Park Rangers.

Born in High Wycombe, Buckinghamshire, Busby's talent was obvious at an early age when he played for Terriers Primary School team for several years. He signed professional forms with QPR in 1970 and made his debut in a 2–1 defeat against Leicester City in April 1970. He was considered one of the brightest prospects that the QPR youth team had produced for many years. He began establishing himself in the first team towards the end of the 1971–72 season when he started the last fourteen matches. The 1972–73 season again saw him start every game until catastrophe struck in a game against Fulham at Craven Cottage in October. He suffered an extremely badly broken leg and it was thought at the time to be career-ending. After the best part of eighteen months out of the game he did return to play but was never quite the same player and remained only a fringe player until he moved to Portsmouth on loan for a spell in 1976. At the end of that season he was transferred to Notts County before rejoining Rangers in September 1977.

He went on to play 146 league games for Rangers scoring 17 league goals in his two spells with the club. He retired in 1981 following an injury. He is the younger brother of former Fulham striker Viv Busby.

He had a brief spell as joint manager of Maidenhead United with Alan Devonshire from June 1996 to March 1997.
