= Dave Clement =

English footballer (1948–1982)

Personal information
- Full name: David Thomas Clement
- Date of birth: 2 February 1948
- Place of birth: Battersea, England
- Date of death: 31 March 1982 (aged 34)
- Place of death: Battersea, England
- Position: Defender

Senior career*
Years	Team	Apps	(Gls)
1965–1979	Queens Park Rangers	407	(22)
1979–1980	Bolton Wanderers	33	(0)
1980–1981	Fulham	18	(0)
1981–1982	Wimbledon	9	(2)
Total		467	(24)

International career
1976–1977	England	5	(0)
- * Club domestic league appearances and goals

David Thomas Clement (2 February 1948 – 31 March 1982) was an English professional footballer. Clement played as a right fullback who developed his career with Queens Park Rangers through the club's youth set-up. Clement signed professional terms in 1965 and made his first team debut in the 1966-67 season. This season was a particularly memorable one for QPR, as they won the Third Division championship by a substantial margin of twelve points and also became the first ever Third Division club to win a major national trophy – the League Cup, defeating the First Division club West Bromwich Albion 3–2 at Wembley Stadium.

The following season, Clement became an established starting member of the team, making 34 appearances in another successful season for QPR as they gained promotion to the First Division. He missed only six games in the four seasons between 1970 and 1974, and made a total of 472 first team appearances for QPR during his fourteen year career at the club.

Clement was selected to represent England in March 1976, making his international debut against Wales. He won five full England caps in total, including two games against Italy.

In June 1979 Clement was transferred to Bolton Wanderers for a fee of £170,000. After playing 33 league games for them he then returned to London, signing in October 1980 for Fulham, where he made 18 league appearances.

Clement then joined Wimbledon in late August 1981. He played nine matches for the club, scoring twice, but broke his right leg during a match at Lincoln City in October 1981. Doctors feared that the injury was serious enough to end his career, although in an interview in early 1982, Clement stated that he hoped to continue playing for a few more years. On 31 March 1982, he died by suicide at his father-in-law's flat in Battersea, having suffered from depression for several years. He killed himself by poisoning himself with weed killer and he also stabbed himself with a kitchen knife. The official verdict at the coroner's inquest into Clement's death stated that a combination of his worries about his football career and the fact that he thought he was suffering from cancer caused him to take his own life.

A special memorial match for Clement was arranged by QPR in order to raise funds for his family, and was held at Loftus Road in the week prior to QPR's first ever FA Cup Final appearance in May 1982.

His younger son Neil, who was only three years old at the time of his father's death, later became a professional footballer himself and spent the majority of his career playing for West Bromwich Albion. His elder son Paul became a noted football coach who worked with Carlo Ancelotti at Chelsea, Paris Saint-Germain, Real Madrid and Bayern Munich, and was formerly manager at Swansea City, Reading and Derby County.
