= Gerry Francis =

English footballer and manager

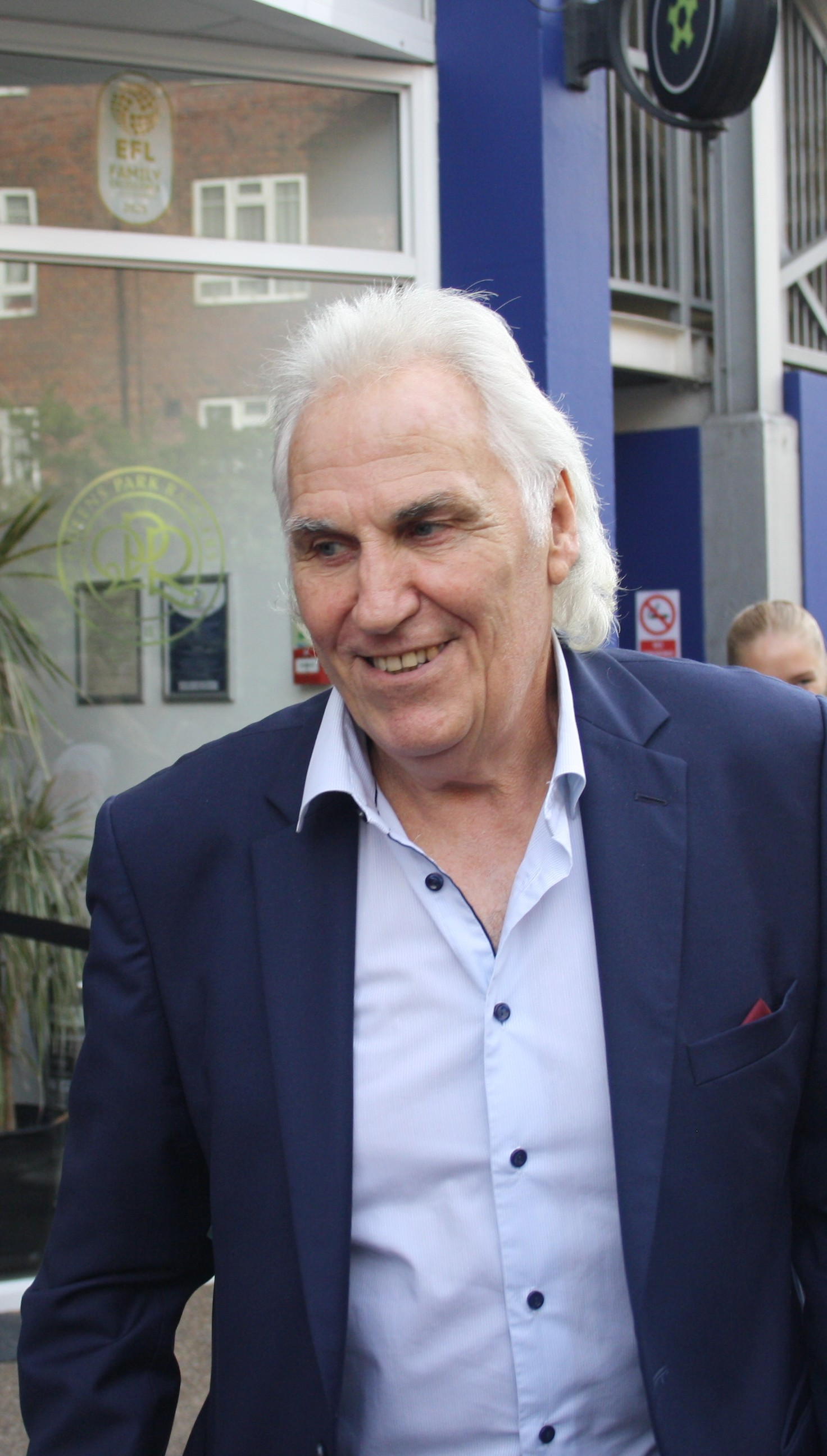
- Gerry Francis in 2025.

Personal information
- Full name: Gerald Charles James Francis
- Date of birth: 6 December 1951 (age 74)
- Place of birth: Chiswick, London, England
- Height: 5 ft 10 in (1.78 m)
- Position: Midfielder

Senior career*
Years	Team	Apps	(Gls)
1968–1979	Queens Park Rangers	295	(53)
1979–1981	Crystal Palace	59	(7)
1981–1982	Queens Park Rangers	17	(4)
1982–1983	Coventry City	50	(2)
1983–1984	Exeter City	28	(3)
1984	Cardiff City	7	(0)
1984	Swansea City	3	(0)
1984–1985	Portsmouth	3	(0)
1985–1986	Bristol Rovers	32	(0)
1986	Wimbledon	0	(0)
Total		494	(69)

International career
1973–1976	England U23	5	(0)
1974–1976	England	12	(3)

Managerial career
- 1983–1984: Exeter City
- 1987–1991: Bristol Rovers
- 1991–1994: Queens Park Rangers
- 1994–1997: Tottenham Hotspur
- 1998–2001: Queens Park Rangers
- 2001: Bristol Rovers
- * Club domestic league appearances and goals

Gerald Charles James Francis (born 6 December 1951) is an English former footballer and manager.

== Playing career ==
Francis made his first team debut for Queens Park Rangers against Liverpool in March 1969. He was captain and central midfield player during the 1970s and was a key player in the QPR side, which came close to winning their first-ever league title in 1976. He won 12 caps for the England team between 1974 and 1976, and was captain for eight of those matches. His international career was limited by a persistent back injury. He left QPR for Crystal Palace in 1979, although he subsequently returned to QPR for a second spell, before a move to Coventry City. However this was a time when he suffered injury problems.

=== Later career ===
In August 1983, he was appointed player-manager of Exeter City although they endured a difficult season. Francis then had further short playing spells at Cardiff City, Swansea City and Portsmouth before a move to Bristol Rovers in 1985 yielded 32 league appearances, where he ended his playing career in 1986 prior to a short non-playing stint as player-coach at Wimbledon.

== Management career ==
=== Bristol Rovers ===
Following a spell as defensive coach at Wimbledon he succeeded Bobby Gould as manager of Third Division side Bristol Rovers. In 1990, he guided the Pirates to the Third Division title and thus they won promotion to the Second Division, but a year later he returned to QPR as manager.

=== Queens Park Rangers ===
In 1992–93, QPR finished fifth in the inaugural Premier League – the highest placed of all the London teams. They finished ninth in 1993–94 and eighth in 1994–95, but in November 1994, Francis left Loftus Road for Tottenham Hotspur.

During his three years in charge at QPR, Francis fielded a side containing some of the most feared players in the top flight. Arguably the finest player at the club during this time was striker Les Ferdinand, who had joined the club from non-league Hayes in 1986 but not established himself in the first team until the season before Francis arrived, when he scored eight goals in 18 First Division games. Francis kept faith in Ferdinand, and was rewarded in 1992–93 when the player hit 20 league goals in one season. Ferdinand remained at QPR until his £6million transfer to Newcastle in 1995, by which time he had scored 78 goals in five league campaigns and was one of the most feared strikers in England, being capped for the first time in 1993. In July 1997, while manager of Tottenham Hotspur, Francis signed Ferdinand for £6million.

With the resignation of Graham Taylor as England national team manager in November 1993 following failure to qualify for the World Cup, Francis was one of the many names linked to the vacancy, but the job went to Terry Venables instead. In March 1994, ambitious Division One club Wolverhampton Wanderers made a lucrative approach for Francis to drop down a division and take charge of the club looking to make the breakthrough to the Premier League, but he rejected the offer and Wolves turned to Graham Taylor instead.

=== Tottenham Hotspur ===
1994–95 was a 'nearly' season for Tottenham. They finished seventh in the Premier League – two places off a UEFA Cup place – and lost to Everton in the semi-finals of the FA Cup. Mid table finishes in the next two seasons were unconvincing and Francis resigned in November 1997 with Spurs battling against relegation from the Premier League. During his time at Tottenham Francis became resented by the fans over his handling of star player Darren Anderton. It has been argued that Francis is largely responsible for Anderton's recurring injuries, placing him in the team without sufficient time to recover, which resulted in Anderton's appearing in only eight games in the 1995–96 season and 17 games in the 1996–97 season.

=== Back to QPR ===
In September 1998, Gerry Francis was named as QPR manager for the second time. They had slumped since his departure four years earlier and were now Division One strugglers. He kept them clear of relegation over the next two seasons before finally resigning in February 2001 with a return to the lower half of the league imminent after more than 30 years. He briefly became Director of Football at QPR before beginning his second spell as manager of Bristol Rovers in June 2001.

=== Bristol Rovers again ===
Three successive wins at the start of the 2001–02 campaign gave the Pirates hope for promotion back to Division Two, but injuries soon took their toll on the side's form and Francis resigned just before Christmas. The Pirates continued to slide and missed out on relegation to the Conference by just one place. Gerry Francis worked with Graham Muxworthy and Ian Holloway whilst at Bristol Rovers. Francis has not been in management since.

=== Stoke City ===
On 4 October 2008, he was offered a position of first team coach at Newcastle United, however due to the uncertainty over the period of the role he decided to take up an offer from Stoke City to become their first team coach. He left Stoke at the end of the 2012–13 season.

=== Crystal Palace ===
Francis followed former Stoke manager Tony Pulis to Crystal Palace when he became a coach under Pulis at the London club. Following Pulis's surprise departure from the club in August 2014 Francis remained in his position in order to assist caretaker manager Keith Millen. However, on 28 August 2014, following the appointment of Neil Warnock as manager it was announced by the club that Francis had left.

== Personal life ==
Francis was a Brentford supporter as a youth and his father Roy was a professional at the club in the late 1940s and early 1950s. His sons Adam and Jake were academy players at Queens Park Rangers.

Francis has been noted for maintaining the same mullet hairstyle throughout his playing, coaching and media careers.

== Honours ==
=== As a manager ===
Bristol Rovers

- Football League Third Division: 1989–90
- Associate Members' Cup runner-up: 1989–90

Individual

- Premier League Manager of the Month: December 1994
