= 1984–85 Queens Park Rangers F.C. season =

English football club season

Queens Park Rangers
1984–85 season
- Chairman: Jim Gregory
- Manager: Alan Mullery sacked 5 December; Frank Sibley acting manager from 6 December, Jim Smith from 11 June
- Stadium: Loftus Road (Highbury Stadium for UEFA Cup Home games)
- First Division: 19th
- FA Cup: Third round
- League Cup: Quarter Finals
- UEFA Cup: Second round
- Top goalscorer: League: Gary Bannister (17); All: Bannister (28)
- Highest home attendance: 27,404 (v Tottenham Hotspur, 12 January 1985)
- Lowest home attendance: 8,403 (v Stoke City, 4 December 1984)
- Average home league attendance: 14,148
- Biggest win: 6-2 Vs Partizan Belgrade (Highbury Stadium) (24 October 1984)
- Biggest defeat: 0-5 Vs Tottenham Hotspur (15 September 1984)
Home colours	Away colours

During the 1984–85 English football season, Queens Park Rangers competed in the First Division for the second season after their promotion in 1983.

== Season summary ==
Appointed in June 1984 to replace Terry Venables, Alan Mullery begin the season as manager but was fired in December after 26 games (11 wins 8 draws and 7 defeats in all competitions). Chairman Jim Gregory appointed caretaker manager Frank Sibley for the remainder of the season. QPR placed 19th place in the First Division, They reached the quarter finals of the League Cup but were beaten in the third round of the FA Cup by Doncaster Rovers . they were knocked out of the UEFA cup in the second round despite a first leg victory by four goals.

== Kit ==
Adidas continued as QPR's kit manufacturers, whilst Brewery Guinness continued as front of shirt sponsors

== Omniturf ==
QPR's home games in the 1984–85 UEFA Cup were played at Arsenal's Highbury Stadium.as QPR's artificial pitch of Omniturf breached UEFA rules on playing surfaces.

== Ticket Prices ==
Seat prices 4, 5, 6, 8 Pounds

Increased to 5, 6,7, 9, Pounds versus Arsenal, Chelsea, Liverpool, Manchester United, Tottenham, Hotspur, West Ham United.

Loftus Road Terrace 2.50 pounds

West End Terrace 3 pounds

Children Terraces 1.50 pound

== League table ==
Pos	Team	Pld	W	D	L	GF	GA	GD	Pts	Qualification or relegation
17	Ipswich Town	42	13	11	18	46	57	−11	50	
18	Coventry City	42	15	5	22	47	64	−17	50	
19	Queens Park Rangers	42	13	11	18	53	72	−19	50	
20	Norwich City (Note: Norwich City would have qualified for the UEFA Cup as League Cup winners.) (R)	42	13	10	19	46	64	−18	49	Qualified for the Football League Super Cup and disqualified from the UEFA Cup and relegated to the Second Division
21	Sunderland (R)	42	10	10	22	40	62	−22	40	Relegation to the Second Division

Source: World Football
Rules for classification: 1) Points; 2) Goal difference; 3) Goals scored
(R) Relegated

== Results ==
QPR scores given first

Win Draw Loss

=== Football League First Division ===
Date	Opponents	Venue	Result F–A	Scorers	Attendance	Position
25 August 1984	West Bromwich Albion	H	3-1	Stainrod 6', 8', Fenwick 65'	12,802	2
28 August 1984	Watford	A	1–1	Bannister 74'	23,615	5
1 September 1984	Liverpool	A	1–1	Fereday 47'	33,982	7
4 September 1984	Stoke City	H	pp			
8 September 1984	Nottingham Forest	H	3-0	Bannister, Fereday 2	13,507	7
15 September 1984	Tottenham Hotspur	A	0-5		31,655	13
22 September 1984	Newcastle United	H	5-5	Wicks 86', Micklewhite 90', Bannister 47', Wharton 57' og, Gregory 70'	14,526	12
29 September 1984	Southampton	A	1-1	Fereday	18,496	11
6 October 1984	Luton Town	H	2-3	Bannister 61', Fillery 27'	12,051	14
13 October 1984	Ipswich Town	A	1-1	Gregory	15,733	15
20 October 1984	Coventry City	H	2–1	Stainrod 2	10,427	11
27 October 1984	Norwich City	A	0-2		14,731	14
3 November 1984	Sunderland	A	0-3		16,408	17
10 November 1984	Sheffield Wednesday	H	0-0		13,390	17
17 November 1984	Arsenal	A	0-1		34,953	18
24 November 1984	Aston Villa	H	2-0	Bannister 57', Gregory 10'	11,689	16
1 December 1984	Leicester City	A	0-4		10,218	18
4 December 1984	Stoke City	H	2-0	Bannister, Gregory	8,403	16
8 December 1984	Everton	H	0–0		14,338	15
15 December 1984	Manchester United	A	0–3		36,134	16
21 December 1984	Liverpool	H	0–2		11,007	18
26 December 1984	Chelsea	H	2-2	Bannister 31', Mcdonald 85'	26,610	18
29 December 1984	Stoke City	A	2-0	Fillery, James	10,811	16
1 January 1985	West Ham United	A	3–1	Byrne, Bannister, Waddock	20,857	14
12 January 1985	Tottenham Hotspur	H	2-2	Bannister 2	27,404	13
19 January 1985	West Bromwich Albion	A	pp			
26 January 1985	West Bromwich Albion	A	0-0		9,200	14
2 February 1985	Southampton	H	0-4		10,664	14
9 February 1985	Nottingham Forest	A	0–2		12,001	14
16 February 1985	Sheffield Wednesday	A	pp			
23 February 1985	Sunderland	H	1–0	Byrne	10,063	13
2 March 1985	Norwich City	H	2–2	Fereday, Wicks	12,975	14
9 March 1985	Coventry City	A	0-3		8,988	15
16 March 1985	Ipswich Town	H	3-0	Bannister, Fereday 2	9,518	13
23 March 1985	Luton Town	A	0-2		9,373	15
30 March 1985	Watford	H	2-0	Fillery 2	12,771	14
6 April 1985	Chelsea	A	0-1		20,340	14
8 April 1985	West Ham United	H	4-2	Fenwick, Bannister 2, Byrne	16,085	12
13 April 1985	Newcastle United	A	0–1		21,711	13
20 April 1985	Arsenal	H	1-0	James	20,189	11
23 April 1985	Sheffield Wednesday	A	1–3	Fillery	22,394	11
27 April 1985	Aston Villa	A	2–5	Bannister 20', 61'	12,023	15
4 May 1985	Leicester City	H	4-3	Bannister, Fillery, Gregory, Robinson	9,071	13
6 May 1985	Everton	A	0–2		50,514	14
11 May 1985	Manchester United	A	1–3	Bannister 63'	20,483	19

=== FA Cup ===
Round	Date	Opponent	Venue	Result F–A	Scorers	Attendance
R3	5 January 1984	Doncaster Rovers (Third Division)	A	0–1		10,583

=== UEFA Cup ===
Round	Date	Opponent	Venue	Result F–A	Scorers	Attendance
R1 First Leg	18 September 1984	CKR Reykjavik	A	3-0	Stainrod 2, Bannister	1,600
R1 Second Leg	2 October 1984	CKR Reykjavik	Highbury Stadium	4-0	Charles, Bannister 3	6,196
R2 First Leg	24 October 1984	Partizan Belgrade	Highbury Stadium	6-2	Stainrod, Bannister 2, Gregory, Neill, Fereday	7,836
R2 Second Leg	7 November 1984	Partizan Belgrade	A	0-4 *lost on away goals		60,000

=== Milk Cup ===
Round	Date	Opponent	Venue	Result F–A	Attendance	Scorers
R2 1st leg	25 September 1984	York City (Third Division)	A	4-2	10,012	Bannister 23', ?, Fenwick, Fereday
R2 2nd leg	9 October 1984	York City (Third Division)	H	4–1 (won 8–3 on agg)	7,544	Bannister 2, Fereday, Micklewhite
R3	30 October 1984	Aston Villa (First Division)	H	1–0	12,547	Gregory 66'
R4	20 November 1984	Southampton (First Division)	A	1-1	13,754	Fenwick 34'(pen)
R4 Replay	27 November 1984	Southampton (First Division)	H	0-0 *AET	14,830	
R4 2nd Replay	5 December 1984		H	pp		
R4 2nd Replay	12 December 1984	Southampton (First Division)	H	4-0	12,702	Waddock, Neill, Fenwick 2
QF 1st leg	23 January 1985	Ipswich Town (First Division)	A	0-0	16,143	
QF 2nd leg	28 January 1985	Ipswich Town (First Division)	H	1-2 (lost 2-1 on agg	14,653	Bannister

=== First Team Friendlies ===
Date	Country	Opponents	Venue	Result F–A	Scorers	Attendance
27-Jul-84	Ireland	Waterford United	A	3-1	Fereday 2, Stainrod	
29-Jul-84	Ireland	Drogheda United	A	3-0	Gregory, Bannister, Chivers	
30-Jul-84	Ireland	Longford Town	A	3-0	Fenwick, Allen pen, Cooper pen	
4-Aug-84	Scotland	Falkirk	A	1-1	Allen	
7-Aug-84	Scotland	Hearts	A	2-3	Mickelwhite, Gregory	
20-Aug-84		Portsmouth	A	2-0	Bannister, Fenwick pen	
16-Feb-85	Gibraltar	Gibraltar	A			
23-May-85	West Germany	Hamburg	A			

== Squad ==
Pos.	Nat.	Name	League Appearances	League Goals	Cup Appearances	Milk Cup Goals	UEFA Cup Goals	Total Appearances	Total Goals
GK	ENG	Peter Hucker	42		13			55	-
GK	ENG	Graham Benstead							-
DF	ENG	Terry Fenwick	41	2	13	4		54	6
DF	NIR	Alan Mcdonald	15	1	2			18	1
DF	ENG	Warren Neill	18	1	10	1		28	2
DF	ENG	Ian Dawes	42		13			55	
DF	ENG	Gary Cooper	1		1			4	
DF	ENG	Steve Wicks	33	2	12			45	2
MF	ENG	Gary Chivers	22		4			27	
MF	ENG	David Kerslake						1	
MF	ENG	John Gregory	35	5	12	1	1	49	7
MF	ENG	Martin Allen	4					7	
MF	ENG	Gary Micklewhite	12	1	5	1		19	2
MF	IRE	Gary Waddock	31	2	8	1		39	2
MF	ENG	Mike Fillery	32	6	9			41	6
FW	ENG	Gary Bannister	42	17	13	5	6	55	28
FW	ENG	Steve Burke						1	
FW	WAL	Robbie James	16	2				20	2
FW	ENG	Wayne Fereday	22	7	9	2	1	39	10
FW	WAL	Jeremy Charles			1		1	3	1
FW	IRE	John Byrne	19	3	1			23	3
FW	ENG	Simon Stainrod	19	4	11		3	30	8
FW	NIR	Ian Stewart	8		5			19	
FW	IRE	Michael Robinson	8	1	1			12	1

== Transfers Out ==
Name	from	Date	Fee	Date	Club	Fee
Tony Sealy	Crystal Palace	March 1981	£80,000	August 1984	Fulham	£60,000
Clive Allen	Crystal Palace	25 May 1981	£475,000	August 1984	Tottenham	£700,000
Mark O'Connor	Queens Park Rangers Juniors	June 1980		September 1984	Bristol R	£30,000
Alan Comfort	Queens Park Rangers Juniors	June 1980		October 1984	Cambridge U	£12,500
Steve Burke	Nottingham Forest	September 1979	£125,000	October 1984	Notts County	Loan
Doug McClure	Queens Park Rangers Juniors	Aug1982		October 1984	Exeter	Free
Jeremy Charles	Swansea City	28 Nov 1983	£100,000	February 1985	Oxford United	£100,000
Simon Stainrod	Oldham Athletic	19 Nov 1980	£270,000	February 1985	Sheffield Wednesday	£250,000
Gary Micklewhite	Manchester United	4 July 1979	Free	February 1985	Derby County	£90,000
Graham Benstead	Queens Park Rangers Juniors	July 1981		March 1985	Norwich City	Loan
Colin Anderson	Torquay	11 Feb 1985	Loan	Mar 85	Torquay	Loan
Martin Duffield	Queens Park Rangers Juniors	Dec1981		May 85	Enfield	Free
Graham Benstead	Queens Park Rangers Juniors	July 1981		June 1985	Norwich City	£10,000

== Transfers In ==
Name	from	Date	Fee
Gary Bannister	Sheffield Wednesday	25 July 1984	£200,000
Robbie James	Stoke	18 Oct 1984	£100,000
John Byrne	York City	16 Oct 1984	£100,000
Gavin Peacock	Queens Park Rangers Juniors	19 Nov 1984	
Michael Robinson	Liverpool	26 Dec 1984	£100,000
Steven Scott		Dec 1984	
Colin Anderson	Torquay	11 Feb 1985	Loan

== Sources ==
- Rothmans Football Yearbook 1980–81 (Editor: Jack Rollin). London: Queen Anne Press. ISBN 0-362-02016-7.
- Pye, Steven (2017). "How Partizan Belgrade overcame QPR after losing the first-leg 6-2 at Highbury". The Guardian.
- "Seasonal Stats - Files". QPRnet.
