= 1982–83 Queens Park Rangers F.C. season =

English football club season

Queens Park Rangers
1982–83 season
- Chairman: Jim Gregory
- Manager: Terry Venables
- Stadium: Loftus Road
- Second Division: 1st
- FA Cup: Third round
- Milk Cup: Second round
- Southern Junior Floodlit Cup: Winners
- Top goalscorer: League: Tony Sealy (16); All: John Gregory (16) and Tony Sealy (16)
- Highest home attendance: 24,431 v Fulham (Second Division, 2 May 1983)
- Lowest home attendance: 8903 v Oldham Athletic (Second Division, 5 February 1983)
- Average home league attendance: 12,806
- Biggest win: 6-1 Vs Middlesbrough (5 March 1983)
- Biggest defeat: 0-4 Vs Wolverhampton Wanderers (18 December 1982)
Home colours	Away colours

During the 1982–83 English football season, Queens Park Rangers competed in the Second Division and finished as champions, winning promotion back to the First Division after an absence of four years.

== Season summary ==
Rangers showed consistent form throughout the season and were never out of the top three from October onwards. After going top with a 4–0 win over Rotherham United on 19 March, they pulled away from the chasing pack to finish ten points clear of 2nd-placed Wolverhampton Wanderers. Promotion was clinched by a 1–0 win over Leeds United on 23 April, and the championship followed courtesy of a 3–1 win over Fulham on 2 May.

QPR Juniors beat Watford 6-2 on Aggregate in the Southern Junior Floodlit Cup final.

== Kit ==
Adidas remained as QPR's kit manufacturers.

== Second Division ==
Pos	Team	Pld	W	D	L	GF	GA	GD	Pts	Relegation
1	Queens Park Rangers (C, P)	42	26	7	9	77	36	+41	85	Promotion to the First Division
2	Wolverhampton Wanderers (P)	42	20	15	7	68	44	+24	75	Promotion to the First Division
3	Leicester City (P)	42	20	10	12	72	44	+28	70	Promotion to the First Division
4	Fulham	42	20	9	13	64	47	+17	69	
5	Newcastle United	42	18	13	11	75	53	+22	67	

Rules for classification: 1) Points; 2) Goal difference; 3) Goals scored
(C) Champions; (P) Promoted

== Results ==
QPR scores given first

Win Draw Loss

=== Second Division ===
Date	Opponents	Venue	Result F–A	Scorers	Attendance	Position
28 August 1982	Newcastle United	A	0–1		36,185	19
31 August 1982	Cambridge United	H	2–1	Sealy 2	9686	9
4 September 1982	Derby County	H	4–1	Gregory, Fenwick (pen), Stainrod 2	10,217	2
7 September 1982	Fulham	A	1–1	Stainrod	15,004	5
11 September 1982	Oldham Athletic	A	1–0	Gregory	4266	3
18 September 1982	Sheffield Wednesday	H	0–2		13,733	6
25 September 1982	Leicester City	A	1–0	O'Neill (og)	10,647	5
28 September 1982	Crystal Palace	H	0–0		12,194	5
2 October 1982	Burnley	H	3–2	Neill, Allen, Micklewhite	9145	4
9 October 1982	Barnsley	A	1–0	Allen	13,270	2
16 October 1982	Shrewsbury Town	H	4–0	Allen, Flanagan, Micklewhite, Gregory	9275	1
23 October 1982	Middlesbrough	A	1–2	Allen	7892	3
30 October 1982	Bolton Wanderers	H	1–0	Stainrod	9363	2
6 November 1982	Rotherham United	A	0–0		7402	3
13 November 1982	Blackburn Rovers	H	2–2	Allen, Fenwick (pen)	9149	2
20 November 1982	Cambridge United	A	4–1	Wicks, Sealy, Allen 2	5685	1
27 November 1982	Carlisle United	H	1–0	Fenwick	9397	1
4 December 1982	Leeds United	A	1–0	Allen	11,528	1
11 December 1982	Grimsby Town	H	4–0	Neill, Sealy, Gregory, Micklewhite	9811	1
18 December 1982	Wolverhampton Wanderers	A	0–4		15,423	1
27 December 1982	Chelsea	H	1–2	Sealy 23'	23,744	2
29 December 1982	Charlton Athletic	A	3–1	Micklewhite 2, Sealy	13,306	2
3 January 1983	Derby County	A	0–2		14,007	2
15 January 1983	Newcastle United	H	2–0	Gregory 2	13,972	2
22 January 1983	Crystal Palace	A	3–0	Allen 2, Hazell	14,621	2
5 February 1983	Oldham Athletic	H	1–0	Sealy	8903	2
12 February 1983	Burnley	A	pp			
19 February 1983	Barnsley	H	3–0	Gregory, Sealy, Flanagan	10,271	2
26 February 1983	Shrewsbury Town	A	0–0		4397	2
5 March 1983	Middlesbrough	H	6–1	Micklewhite, Flanagan, Allen 3, Gregory	9596	2
12 March 1983	Bolton Wanderers	A	2–3	Gregory (pen), Sealy	6373	2
19 March 1983	Rotherham United	H	4–0	Sealy, Flanagan, Gregory 2	9541	1
22 March 1983	Charlton Athletic	H	5–1	Sealy 2, Hazell, Gregory, Stainrod	10,776	1
26 March 1983	Blackburn Rovers	A	3–1	Stainrod 2, Flanagan	5317	1
4 April 1983	Chelsea	A	2–0	Gregory 39', Sealy 51'	20,821	1
9 April 1983	Leicester City	H	2–2	Gregory, Sealy	16,301	1
19 April 1983	Sheffield Wednesday	A	1–0	Flanagan	11,713	1
23 April 1983	Leeds United	H	1–0	Hart (og)	19,573	1
30 April 1983	Carlisle United	A	0–1		5724	1
2 May 1983	Fulham	H	3–1	Gregory, Sealy, Stainrod	24,431	1
7 May 1983	Wolverhampton Wanderers	H	2–1	Flanagan, Hazell	19,854	1
10 May 1983	Burnley	A	1–2	Sealy	7191	1
14 May 1983	Grimsby Town	A	1–1	Stainrod	9590	1

=== Milk Cup ===
Date	Round	Opponents	H / A	Result F–A	Scorers	Attendance
4 October 1982	Second Round First Leg	Rotherham United (Second Division)	A	1–2	Gregory	5603
26 October 1982	Second Round Second Leg	Rotherham United (Second Division)	H	0–0		9653

=== FA Cup ===
Date	Round	Opponents	H / A	Result F–A	Scorers	Attendance
8 January 1983	Third Round	West Bromwich Albion (First Division)	A	2–3	Fenwick (pen), Micklewhite	16,528

=== Friendlies ===
Date	Country	Opponents	Venue	Result F–A	Scorers	Attendance
25-Jul-82	Sweden	IS Halmia	A	3-2	Simon Stainrod, Terry Fenwick, Steve Wicks	
27-Jul-82	Sweden	Myresjo IF Sweden	A	1-0	Clive Allen	
28-Jul-82	Sweden	Kalmar FF	A	0-1		
31-Jul-82	Sweden	Veberöds	A	5-0	Clive Allen, (2), Tony Sealy (2), Warren Neill.	
2-Aug-82	Sweden	Hjärnarps GIF	A	8-0	Mike Flanagan (3), Bobby Hazell (2), Tony Sealy, Ian Dawes, Ian Stewart	
11-Aug-82	Ireland	Finn Harps	A			
13-Aug-82	Ireland	St Patricks	A			
15-Aug-82	Ireland	Drogheda United	A			
18-Aug-82		Brighton & Hove Albion	A			
21-Aug-82		Gillingham	A			
23-Aug-82		Wimbledon	A			
31-Jan-83		Southampton	A			
14-Apr-83		Aston Villa	A			
4-May-83	Steve Jones & Tony Tagg Testimonial	Wimbledon	H			
18-May-83	Perth, Australia	Perth XI	A	6-1		
22 May 1983	Christchurch, New Zealand	Canterbury XI	Queen Elizabeth II Park,	1-0	Clive Allen	6000
24 May 1983	Wellington, New Zealand	Wellington XI	Basin Reserve	2-1	Stainrod, Fenwick	8000
29 May 1983	Auckland, New Zealand	Auckland XI	Mount Smart Stadium	2-2	Clive Allen 2	5000
1-Jun-83	Noumea New Caledonia	New Caledonia		2-3		
3-Jun-83	Noumea New Caledonia	District Assoc. XI		2-1		

== Squad ==
Pos.	Nat.	Name	League Appearances	League Goals	Milk Cup Appearances	Milk Cup Goals	F A Cup Appearances	F A Cup Goals	Total Appearances	Total Goals
GK	ENG	Peter Hucker	42	0	2	0	0	0	44	0
GK	ENG	Graham Benstead	0	0	0	0	1	0	1	0
DF	ENG	Ian Dawes	42	0	2	0	1	0	45	0
DF	ENG	Terry Fenwick	39	3	2	0	1	1	42	4
DF	JAM	Bob Hazell	39	3	2	0	1	0	42	3
DF	ENG	Doug McClure	0	0	0	0	0	0	0	0
DF	NIR	Alan McDonald	0	0	0	0	0	0	0	0
DF	ENG	Warren Neill	39	2	2	0	1	0	42	2
DF	ENG	Glenn Roeder	9	0	0	0	1	0	10	0
DF	ENG	Steve Wicks	14	1	0	0	0	0	14	1
MF	ENG	Tony Currie	1(1)	0	0	0	0	0	1(1)	0
MF	ENG	Martin Duffield	0(1)	0	0	0	0	0	0(1)	0
MF	ENG	John Gregory	42	15	2	1	0	0	44	16
MF	ENG	Gary Micklewhite	33(1)	6	2	0	1	1	36(1)	7
MF	IRE	Mark O'Connor	1(1)	0	0	0	0	0	1(1)	0
MF	IRE	Gary Waddock	33	0	2	0	1	0	36	0
MF	ENG	Dean Wilkins	0(3)	0	0	0	0	0	0(3)	0
FW	ENG	Clive Allen	23(2)	13	2	0	1	0	26(2)	13
FW	ENG	Steve Burke	1(4)	0	0	0	0(1)	0	1(5)	0
FW	ENG	Alan Comfort	0	0	0	0	0	0	0	0
FW	ENG	Wayne Fereday	0(5)	0	0	0	0	0	0(5)	0
FW	ENG	Mike Flanagan	21(1)	7	0	0	1	0	22(1)	7
FW	ENG	Ian Muir	0	0	0	0	0	0	0	0
FW	ENG	Tony Sealy	39(1)	16	2	0	1	0	42(1)	16
FW	ENG	Simon Stainrod	29(2)	9	2	0	0	0	31(2)	9
FW	NIR	Ian Stewart	15(4)	0	0(1)	0	0	0	15(5)	0

== Transfers Out ==
Name	from	Date	Fee	Date	Club	Fee
John Burridge	Crystal Palace	16 December 1980	£250,000	August 1982	Wolverhampton Wanderers	£80,000
Ian Muir	Queens Park Rangers Juniors	September 1980		October 1982	Burnley	Loan
Alan McDonald	Queens Park Rangers Juniors	August 1981		March 1983	Charlton	Loan
Ian Stewart	Queens Park Rangers Juniors	May 1980		March 1983	Millwall	Loan
Tony Currie	Leeds United	9 August 1979	£400,000	April 1983	Toronto Nationals	£40,000
Dean Wilkins	Queens Park Rangers Juniors	17 May 1980		June 1983	Brighton	Free
Ian Muir	Queens Park Rangers Juniors	3 September 1980		June 1983	Birmingham City	Free

== Transfers In ==
Name	from	Date	Fee
Doug McClure	Queens Park Rangers Juniors	August 1982	
Alan Comfort	Queens Park Rangers Juniors	October 1982	
Martin Allen	Queens Park Rangers Juniors	27 May 1983	
Gary Cooper	Queens Park Rangers Juniors	2 June 1983	
David Kerslake	Queens Park Rangers Juniors	June 1983	
