= 1987–88 Queens Park Rangers F.C. season =

English football club season

Queens Park Rangers
1987–88 season
- Chairman: David Bulstrode
- Manager: Jim Smith
- Stadium: Loftus Road
- First Division: 5th
- FA Cup: Fifth round
- League Cup: Third round
- Top goalscorer: League: Gary Bannister (8); All: Bannister (10)
- Highest home attendance: 23,171 (v Liverpool, 5 March 1988)
- Lowest home attendance: 7,229 (v Coventry City, 18 December 1987)
- Average home league attendance: 16,049
- Biggest win: 3–0 Vs West Ham (15 August 1987), Norwich City (19 March 1988), Southampton (1 January 1988), Yeovil Town (9 January 1988)
- Biggest defeat: 0–4 Vs Liverpool (17 October 1987), Nottingham Forest (13 December 1987)
| Home colours | Away colours |

During the 1987–88 English football season, Queens Park Rangers competed in the First Division for the fifth season after their promotion in 1983.

== Season summary ==
Jim Smith led QPR to fifth place in the First Division, matching their position in the 1983–84 season. They had led the table in October after winning eight of their first ten League matches. They suffered a surprise defeat to Bury in the third round of the League Cup and reached the fifth round of the FA Cup.

== Kit ==
Adidas continued as QPR's kit manufacturers. Airline KLM became new kit sponsors.

== League table ==
| Pos | Team | Pld | W | D | L | GF | GA | GD | Pts | Qualification or relegation |
|---|---|---|---|---|---|---|---|---|---|---|
| 3 | Nottingham Forest | 40 | 20 | 13 | 7 | 67 | 39 | +28 | 73 | Qualified for the Football League Centenary Trophy |
| 4 | Everton | 40 | 19 | 13 | 8 | 53 | 27 | +26 | 70 | Qualified for the Football League Centenary Trophy |
| 5 | Queens Park Rangers | 40 | 19 | 10 | 11 | 48 | 38 | +10 | 67 | Qualified for the Football League Centenary Trophy |
| 6 | Arsenal | 40 | 18 | 12 | 10 | 58 | 39 | +19 | 66 | Qualified for the Football League Centenary Trophy |
| 7 | Wimbledon (Note: Wimbledon would have qualified as FA Cup winners.) | 40 | 14 | 15 | 11 | 58 | 47 | +11 | 57 | Qualified for the Football League Centenary Trophy and disqualified from the European Cup Winners' Cup |

Source: World Football
Rules for classification: 1) Points; 2) Goal difference; 3) Goals scored

== Results ==
Queens Park Rangers' score comes first

Win Draw Loss

=== Football League First Division ===
| Date | Opponents | Venue | Result F–A | Scorers | Attendance | Position |
|---|---|---|---|---|---|---|
| 15 August 1987 | West Ham United | A | 3–0 | Stewart (o.g.), Bannister, Brock | 22,882 | 1 |
| 19 August 1987 | Derby County | H | 1–1 | Bannister | 11,561 | 4 |
| 22 August 1987 | Arsenal | H | 2–0 | Byrne, McDonald | 15,981 | 1 |
| 29 August 1987 | Southampton | A | 1–0 | Brock | 15,532 | 1 |
| 2 September 1987 | Everton | H | 1–0 | Allen | 15,380 | 1 |
| 5 September 1987 | Charlton Athletic | A | 1–0 | Coney | 7,726 | 1 |
| 12 September 1987 | Chelsea | H | 3–1 | Bannister 56', 72', 89' | 22,583 | 1 |
| 19 September 1987 | Oxford United | A | 0–2 | | 9,800 | 1 |
| 26 September 1987 | Luton Town | H | 2–0 | Coney, Fenwick (pen) | 11,175 | 1 |
| 3 October 1987 | Wimbledon | A | 2–1 | Bannister, Fenwick (pen) | 8,552 | 1 |
| 17 October 1987 | Liverpool | A | 0–4 | | 43,735 | 2 |
| 24 October 1987 | Portsmouth | H | 2–1 | Byrne, Fenwick | 13,170 | 2 |
| 31 October 1987 | Norwich City | A | 1–1 | Allen | 14,522 | 3 |
| 4 November 1987 | Watford | H | PP | | | |
| 7 November 1987 | Watford | H | 0–0 | | 12,101 | 3 |
| 14 November 1987 | Tottenham Hotspur | A | 1–1 | Coney | 28,113 | 3 |
| 21 November 1987 | Newcastle United | H | 1–1 | Wharton (o.g.) | 11,794 | 3 |
| 28 November 1987 | Sheffield Wednesday | A | 1–3 | Bannister | 16,933 | 3 |
| 5 December 1987 | Manchester United | H | 0–2 | | 20,632 | 3 |
| 13 December 1987 | Nottingham Forest | A | 0–4 | | 18,130 | 6 |
| 18 December 1987 | Coventry City | H | 1–2 | Falco | 7,229 | 6 |
| 26 December 1987 | Chelsea | A | 1–1 | Kerslake 50' | 18,020 | 6 |
| 28 December 1987 | Oxford United | H | 3–2 | Falco (2), Allen | 9,125 | 6 |
| 1 January 1988 | Southampton | H | 3–0 | Bannister, Falco, Fereday | 8,631 | 5 |
| 2 January 1988 | Arsenal | A | 0–0 | | 28,271 | 6 |
| 16 January 1988 | West Ham United | H | 0–1 | | 14,909 | 7 |
| 23-Jan-88 | Derby County | A | PP | | | |
| 6 February 1988 | Charlton Athletic | H | 2–0 | Falco, Byrne | 11,512 | 5 |
| 13 February 1988 | Everton | A | 0–2 | | 24,724 | 6 |
| 20 February 1988 | Luton Town | A | PP | | | |
| 27 February 1988 | Wimbledon | H | 1–0 | Byrne | 9,080 | 6 |
| 5 March 1988 | Liverpool | H | 0–1 | | 23,171 | 6 |
| 16 March 1988 | Nottingham Forest | H | PP | | | |
| 19 March 1988 | Norwich City | H | 3–0 | Channing, Coney, Fereday | 9,032 | 6 |
| 23 March 1988 | Nottingham Forest | H | 2–1 | Coney, Fereday | 8,316 | 6 |
| 26 March 1988 | Portsmouth | A | 1–0 | Coney | 13,041 | 4 |
| 1 April 1988 | Watford | A | 1–0 | McDonald | 16,083 | 5 |
| 4 April 1988 | Tottenham Hotspur | H | 2–0 | Kerslake (2) | 14,783 | 5 |
| 9 April 1988 | Newcastle United | A | 1–1 | Kerslake (pen) | 18,403 | 5 |
| 13 April 1988 | Derby County | A | 2–0 | Allen, Fereday | 14,214 | 3 |
| 19 April 1988 | Luton Town | A | 1–2 | Kerslake (pen) | 6,735 | 4 |
| 23 April 1988 | Sheffield Wednesday | H | 1–1 | Coney | 12,541 | 4 |
| 30 April 1988 | Manchester United | A | 1–2 | McDonald70' | 37,733 | 4 |
| 7 May 1988 | Coventry City | A | 0–0 | | 16,089 | 5 |

=== FA Cup ===
| Round | Date | Opponent | Venue | Result F–A | Scorers | Attendance |
|---|---|---|---|---|---|---|
| R3 | 9 January 1988 | Yeovil Town (Isthmian League) | A | 3–0 | Falco (2), Brock | 9,717 |
| R4 | 30 January 1988 | West Ham United (First Division) | H | 3–1 | Pizanti, Bannister, Allen | 23,651 |
| R5 | 20 February 1988 | Luton Town (First Division) | H | 1–1 | Neill | 15,356 |
| R5 replay | 24 February 1988 | Luton Town (First Division) | A | 0–1 | | 10,854 |

=== Littlewoods Challenge Cup ===
| Round | Date | Opponent | Venue | Result F–A | Scorers | Attendance |
|---|---|---|---|---|---|---|
| R2 1st leg | 23 August 1987 | Millwall (Second Division) | H | 2–1 | Bannister, McDonald | 11,865 |
| R2 2nd leg | 6 October 1987 | Millwall (Second Division) | A | 0–0 (won 2–1 on agg) | | 11,225 |
| R3 | 27 October 1987 | Bury (Third Division) | A | 0–1 | | 5,384 |

=== Simod Cup ===
| Round | Date | Opponent | Venue | Result F–A | Scorers | Attendance |
|---|---|---|---|---|---|---|
| First round | 21 December 1987 | Reading | H | 1–3 | Allen | 4,004 |

=== Friendlies ===
| Date | Country | Opponents | Venue | Result F–A | Scorers | Attendance |
|---|---|---|---|---|---|---|
| 19-Jul-87 | Leo Morris Testimonial | Hounslow v Queens Park Rangers | A | | | |
| 21-Jul-87 | E-Cup International Tournament, Norway | Mjøndalen v Queens Park Rangers | A | | | |
| 23-Jul-87 | E-Cup International Tournament, Norway | Lillestrøm v Queens Park Rangers | A | | | |
| 25-Jul-87 | E-Cup International Tournament, Norway | Tromsø v Queens Park Rangers | A | | | |
| 30-Jul-87 | | Queens Park Rangers v Bradford City | H | | | |
| 31-Jul-87 | | Queens Park Rangers v Seattle Storm | H | | | |
| 1-Aug-87 | NAC Breda 75th Jubilee International Tournament, Holland | PAOK v Queens Park Rangers | A | | | |
| 2-Aug-87 | NAC Breda 75th Jubilee International Tournament, Holland | Haarlem v Queens Park Rangers | A | | | |
| 6-Aug-87 | AZ Alkmaar toernooi | PEC Zwolle | A | | | |
| 8-Aug-87 | AZ Alkmaar toernooi | AZ Alkmaar v Queens Park Rangers | A | | | |
| 10-Oct-87 | France | HAC (Le Harve) v Queens Park Rangers | A | 1–1 | Coney | 1,500 |
| 9-Nov-87 | | Leicester United v Queens Park Rangers | A | | | |
| 25-Jan-88 | Keith Solomon Memorial Shield | Truro City v Queens Park Rangers | A | | | |
| 8-Feb-88 | | Queens Park Rangers v Le Harve | H | | | |
| 12-Feb-88 | | Queens Park Rangers v Monaco | H | | | |
| 15-Feb-88 | Gary Waddock Testimonial | Queens Park Rangers v Charleroi | H | | | |
| 9-May-88 | Steve Leslie Benefit | Colchester United v Queens Park Rangers | A | | | |

=== Post Season Tour ===
The 1988 President's Cup International Football Tournament (Korean: 제17회 대통령배 국제축구대회) was the 17th competition of Korea Cup. This edition was held from 16 to 28 June 1988 to prepare the 1988 Summer Olympics.

=== Group C ===
| Team | Pld | W | D | L | GF | GA | GD | Pts |
|---|---|---|---|---|---|---|---|---|
| Soviet Union XI | 3 | 3 | 0 | 0 | 5 | 0 | +5 | 6 |
| (Nigeria) Iwuanyanwu Nationale | 3 | 1 | 1 | 1 | 4 | 4 | 0 | 3 |
| (England) Queens Park Rangers | 3 | 0 | 2 | 1 | 2 | 5 | −3 | 2 |
| United States | 3 | 0 | 1 | 2 | 3 | 5 | −2 | 1 |

16 June 1988
20:20 KST

| United States | 0–1 | Soviet Union XI |
|---|---|---|
| | | Gorlukovich 18' |

Seoul Olympic Stadium, Seoul

17 June 1988
19:50 KST

| Iwuanyanwu Nationale (Nigeria) | 1–1 | (England) Queens Park Rangers |
|---|---|---|
| Obiku 85' | | Pizanti 3' |

Daejeon Hanbat Sports Complex, Daejeon

19 June 1988
18:00 KST

| United States | 2–3 | (Nigeria) Iwuanyanwu Nationale |
|---|---|---|
| Trittschuh 24', 90+4' | Report | Igwilo 15', 47'; Ozogula 66' |

Gwangju Mudeung Stadium, Gwangju

19 June 1988
19:50 KST

| Soviet Union XI | 3–0 | (England) Queens Park Rangers |
|---|---|---|
| Ponomaryov 7' (pen.); Shmarov 24'; Janonis 53' | Report |

Gwangju Mudeung Stadium, Gwangju

21 June 1988
16:00 KST

| Soviet Union XI | 1–0 | (Nigeria) Iwuanyanwu Nationale |
|---|---|---|
| ? 56' | Report |

Gumi Civic Stadium, Gumi

21 June 1988
17:50 KST

| United States | 1–1 | (England) Queens Park Rangers |
|---|---|---|
| Trittschuh 2' | | Fereday 30' |

Gumi Civic Stadium, Gumi

== Squad ==
| Position | Nationality | Name | League Appearances | League Goals | Cup Appearances | Littlewoods Challenge Cup goals | F.A.Cup Goals | Total Appearances | Total Goals |
|---|---|---|---|---|---|---|---|---|---|
| GK | ENG | David Seaman | 32 | | 4 | | | 36 | |
| GK | ENG | Nicky Johns | 7 | | 4 | | | 11 | |
| GK | ENG | Tony Roberts | 1 | | | | | 1 | |
| DF | ENG | Kevin Brock | 26 | 2 | 7 | | 1 | 33 | 3 |
| DF | ENG | Terry Fenwick | 22 | 3 | 4 | | | 26 | 3 |
| DF | WAL | Brian Law | | | | | | 1 | |
| DF | NIR | Alan Mcdonald | 36 | 3 | 8 | 1 | | 44 | 4 |
| DF | ENG | Paul Parker | 40 | | 8 | | | 48 | |
| DF | ENG | Warren Neill | 25 | | 6 | | 1 | 33 | 1 |
| DF | ENG | Ian Dawes | 28 | | 6 | | | 35 | |
| DF | ENG | Danny Maddix | 6 | | 3 | | | 9 | |
| DF | NIR | John O'Neill | 2 | | | | | 2 | |
| DF | ENG | Justin Channing | 7 | 1 | 1 | | | 15 | |
| DF | ENG | Mark Dennis | 10 | | 2 | | | 13 | |
| MF | ENG | Mark Fleming | | | | | | 2 | |
| MF | ENG | David Kerslake | 16 | 5 | 5 | | | 21 | 5 |
| MF | ISR | David Pizanti | 3 | | 2 | | 1 | 9 | 1 |
| MF | ENG | Gavin Peacock | | | | | | 5 | |
| MF | ENG | Martin Allen | 38 | 4 | 8 | | 1 | 46 | 5 |
| MF | ENG | Gavin Maguire | 13 | | 4 | | | 22 | |
| FW | ENG | Gary Bannister | 24 | 8 | 6 | 1 | 1 | 30 | 10 |
| FW | ENG | Les Ferdinand | 1 | | 1 | | | 2 | |
| FW | ENG | Wayne Fereday | 33 | 4 | 6 | | | 43 | 4 |
| FW | ENG | Trevor Francis | 8 | | 1 | | | 9 | |
| FW | IRE | John Byrne | 22 | 4 | 5 | | | 34 | |
| FW | ENG | Mark Falco | 15 | 5 | 5 | | 2 | 24 | 7 |
| FW | ENG | Dean Coney | 25 | 7 | 2 | | | 36 | 7 |

== Transfers Out ==
| Name | from | Date | Fee | Date | Club | Fee |
|---|---|---|---|---|---|---|
| Paul Barron | West Bromwich | 14 Mar 1985 | £40,000 | July 87 | Welling U (out 1 yr – injury) | |
| Sammy Lee | Liverpool | 25 Aug 1986 | £210,000 | July 87 | Osasuna (Spa) | £200,000 |
| Mark Loram | Torquay | 12 May 1986 | £40,000 | July 87 | Torquay | £15,000 |
| Robbie James | Stoke | 18 Oct 1984 | £100,000 | July 1987 | Leicester City | £75,000 |
| Mike Fillery | Chelsea | 17 Aug 1983 | £200,000 | Aug 87 | Portsmouth | Free |
| Gary Chivers | Swansea City | 3 Feb 1984 | Free | September 1987 | Watford | Free |
| Clive Walker | Sunderland | 13 Dec 1985 | £75,000 | October 1987 | Fulham | Free |
| Gavin Peacock | Queens Park Rangers Juniors | 19 Nov 1984 | | October 1987 | Gillingham | £60,000 |
| Gary Waddock | Queens Park Rangers Juniors | 26 July 1979 | | December 1987 | Charleroi SC | £120,000 |
| Terry Fenwick | Crystal Palace | 15 Dec 1980 | £110,000 | December 1987 | Tottenham Hotspur | £550,000 |
| John O'Neill | Leicester City | 27 July 1987 | £150,000 | December 1987 | Norwich City | £95,000 |
| Gary Bannister | Sheffield Wednesday | 25 July 1984 | £200,000 | March 1988 | Coventry City | £300,000 |
| Jimmy Carter | Crystal Palace | September 1985 | | March 1988 | Millwall | £20,000 |
| Les Ferdinand | Hayes | March 1987 | £50,000 | March 1988 | Brentford | Loan |

== Transfers In ==
| Name | from | Date | Fee |
|---|---|---|---|
| Danny Maddix | Tottenham | 23 July 1987 | Free |
| Tony Roberts | Queens Park Rangers Juniors | 24 July 1987 | |
| John O'Neill | Leicester City | 27 July 1987 | £150,000 |
| Brian Law | Queens Park Rangers Juniors | 15 Aug 1987 | |
| Kevin Brock | Oxford | 12 Aug 1987 | £260,000 |
| David Pizanti | FC Köln | September 1987 | £150,000 |
| Steve Lynch | Queens Park Rangers Juniors | 7 Oct 1987 | |
| Nicky Johns | Charlton | 20 Dec 1987 | £40,000 |
| Mark Falco | Glasgow Rangers | 4 Dec 1987 | £350,000 |
| Mark Fleming | Queens Park Rangers Juniors | January 1988 | |
| Roberto Herrera | Queens Park Rangers Juniors | March 1988 | |
| Greg Costello | Queens Park Rangers Juniors | 10 Mar 1988 | |
| Trevor Francis | Glasgow Rangers | 24 Mar 1988 | Free |
| Mark Stein | Luton Town | June 1988 | £300,000 |
| Dean Neal | Southend | 13 June 1988 | Loan |
