= 1985–86 Queens Park Rangers F.C. season =

English football club season

Queens Park Rangers
1985–86 season
- Manager: Jim Smith
- Stadium: Loftus Road
- First Division: 13th
- FA Cup: Fifth round
- League Cup: Finalist
- Top goalscorer: League: Gary Bannister (16); All: Bannister (17)
- Highest home attendance: 24,621 (v Liverpool, 5 October 1985)
- Lowest home attendance: 7,021 (v Hull City, 24 September 1985)
- Average home league attendance: 15,241
- Biggest win: 6-0 Vs Chelsea (31 March 1986)
- Biggest defeat: 0-4 Vs Nottingham Forest (1 February 1986)
Home colours	Away colours

During the 1985–86 English football season, Queens Park Rangers competed in the First Division for the third season after their promotion in 1983.

== Season summary ==
Newly appointed Manager Jim Smith led QPR to 13th place in the First Division, Season highlights included reaching the milk cup final at Wembley Stadium, Canon league home wins over Title contenders Liverpool, Everton, Manchester United and a memorable 6–0 defeat of local rivals Chelsea. Lows suffered during the season with defeat to Oxford United in the Wembley Final of the League Cup and defeat in third round of the FA Cup by third division Carlisle United .

== Kit ==
Adidas continued as QPR's kit manufacturers with additions to the shirt including red stripes to shirt, shorts and socks. Brewery Guinness continued as front of shirt sponsors

== Ticket Prices ==
Seat prices 4, 5, 6, 8 Pounds

Increased to 6,7, 9, 10 Pounds versus, Arsenal, Chelsea, Liverpool, Manchester United, Tottenham, Hotspur, West Ham United.

Loftus Road Terrace, West End Terrace, Paddock 3 pounds

Children Terraces 1.50 pound

== League table ==
Pos	Team	Pld	W	D	L	GF	GA	GD	Pts
11	Newcastle United	42	17	12	13	67	72	−5	63
12	Watford	42	16	11	15	69	62	+7	59
13	Queens Park Rangers	42	15	7	20	53	64	−11	52
14	Southampton	42	12	10	20	51	62	−11	46
15	Manchester City	42	11	12	19	43	57	−14	45

Source: World Football
Rules for classification: 1) Points; 2) Goal difference; 3) Goals scored

== Results ==
Queens Park Rangers' score comes first

Win Draw Loss

=== Football League First Division ===
Date	Opponents	Venue	Result F–A	Scorers	Attendance	Position
17 August 1985	Ipswich Town	H	1–0	Byrne 71'	12,755	6
20 August 1985	West Ham United	A	1–3	Byrne 55'	15,530	10
24 August 1985	Aston Villa	A	2–1	Bannister 3', 89'	11,896	5
27 August 1985	Nottingham Forest	H	2–1	Bannister, Fenwick (pen)	10,748	3
31 August 1985	Newcastle United	A	1-3	Fenwick	25,026	7
3 September 1985	Arsenal	H	0-1		15,993	9
7 September 1985	Everton	H	3-0	Bannister (2), Byrne	16,544	7
14 September 1985	Watford	A	0–2		15,771	11
21 September 1985	Luton Town	A	0-2		9,508	12
28 September 1985	Birmingham City	H	3–1	Bannister, Dawes, Rosenior	10,911	11
5 October 1985	Liverpool	H	2-1	Fenwick 43', Bannister 63'	24,621	8
12 October 1985	Manchester United	A	0-2		48,845	9
19 October 1985	Manchester City	H	0-0		13,471	12
26 October 1985	Southampton	A	0-3		15,615	12
2 November 1985	Sheffield Wednesday	H	1–1	James 80'	12,123	13
9 November 1985	West Bromwich Albion	A	1–0	Robinson	9,016	11
16 November 1985	Leicester City	H	2-0	Wicks, Fereday	11,085	9
23 November 1985	Tottenham Hotspur	A	1–1	Byrne	20,334	9
30 November 1985	Coventry City	H	0–2		11,101	11
7 December 1985	West Ham United	H	0–1		22,836	12
14 December 1985	Ipswich Town	A	0–1		12,032	13
17 December 1985	Aston Villa	H	0–1		11,237	13
26-Dec-1985	Chelsea	A	pp			
28 December 1985	Arsenal	A	1–3	Bannister	25,770	14
1 January 1986	Oxford United	H	3–1	Byrne, Martin Allen, Fereday	16,348	14
11 January 1986	Everton	A	3-4	Bannister 2, Byrne	26,015	15
18 January 1986	Newcastle United	H	3-1	Fenwick 2, Robinson	13,159	15
1 February 1986	Nottingham Forest	A	0-4		11,538	15
8 February 1986	Manchester City	A	0–2		20,414	15
22 February 1986	Luton Town	H	1–1	Byrne	16,252	16
1 March 1986	Birmingham City	A	0–2		7,093	16
8 March 1986	Liverpool	A	1–4	Rosenior 7'	26,219	16
11 March 1986	Southampton	H	0–2		14,174	16
15 March 1986	Manchester United	H	1–0	Byrne 81'	13,041	15
19 March 1986	Chelsea	A	1–1	Kerslake 85'	17,871	15
22 March 1986	Watford	H	2–1	Fenwick, Robinson	14,069	14
29 March 1986	Oxford United	A	3–3	Walker 11', Martin Allen 23', Fenwick	11,910	14
31 March 1986	Chelsea	H	6–0	Bannister 7'. 22', 57', Byrne43',64', Rosenior 82'	18,584	13
8 April 1986	Sheffield Wednesday	A	0-0		13.157	13
12 April 1986	West Bromwich Albion	H	1–0	Bannister	11,866	13
14 April 1986	Leicester	A	4-1	Allen, Bannister Robinson, Byrne	7,724	13
26 April 1986	Tottenham Hotspur	H	2-5	Bannister, Rosenior	17,768	13
3 May 1986	Coventry City	A	1-2	Byrne	14,068	13

=== FA Cup ===
Round	Date	Opponent	Venue	Result F–A	Scorers	Attendance
R3	13 January 1986	Carlisle United (Second Division)	A	0–1		5,080

=== Milk Cup ===
Round	Date	Opponent	Venue	Result F–A	Attendance	Scorers
R2 1st leg	24 September 1985	Hull City (Second Division)	H	3–0	7,021	Bannister, Dawes, Kerslake
R2 2nd leg	8 October 1985	Hull City (Second Division)	A	5–1 (won 8–1 on agg)	4,287	David Kerslake 2, Fillery, Rosenior 2
R3	29 October 1985	Watford (First Division)	A	1–0	16,826	Byrne
R4	19-Nov-1985	Nottingham Forest (First Division)	H	PP		
R4	25 November 1985	Nottingham Forest (First Division)	H	3–1	13,057	Bannister, Byrne, Fenwick
R5 1st leg	22 January 1986	Chelsea (First Division)	H	1–1	27,000	Byrne 12
R5 2nd leg	29 January 1986	Chelsea (First Division)	A	2-0 *AET	27,937	McDonald 109 ', Robinson 119'
SF 1st leg	12 February 1986	Liverpool (First Division)	H	1–0	15,051	Terry Fenwick 22'
SF 2nd leg	5 March 1986	Liverpool (First Division)	A	2–2 (won 3–2 on agg	23.863	Whelan O/G 58', Gillespie O/G 84'
Final	30 April 1986	Oxford United (First Division)	Wembley	0–3	90,396	

=== Friendlies ===
Date	Country	Opponents	Venue	Result F–A	Scorers	Attendance
27-Jul-85		Wimbledon	A			
27-Jul-85*		Wimbledon	A			
31-Jul-85		Fulham v Queens Park Rangers	A			
1-Aug-85	Glenn Elliot Testimonial	Cottingham	A			
2-Aug-85		Colchester United	H			
10-Aug-85		Millwall	A			
16-Sep-85		Maidstone United	A			
		Ruislip	A	1-0	Kerslake 85'	
24-Feb-86	Anniello Iannone Testimonial	Anni's XI	A			
26-Feb-86		Ottery St Mary	A			
10-Mar-86		Ruislip	A	3-1	Walker, Burke and Fereday	1,500
7 May 1986	David Fogg Testimonial	Oxford United	A			
5 July 1986	USA	Tampa Bay	A			

=== Football Combination ===
Date	Opponent	Location	Score	Scorers
17 August 1985	Crystal Palace	A	1-2	Allen
21 August 1985	Oxford United	H	1-1	Peacock

South East Counties League

Date	Opponent	Location	Score	Scorers
17 August 1985	Ipswich Town	H	1-1	John

== Squad ==
Position	Nationality	Name	League Appearances	League Goals	Cup Appearances	Milk Cup Goals	Total Appearances	Total Goals
GK	ENG	Peter Hucker	11				11	
GK	ENG	Paul Barron	31		10		41	
DF	ENG	Terry Fenwick	37	7	9	2	46	9
DF	NIR	Alan Mcdonald	43		9	1	52	1
DF	ENG	Warren Neill	16		6		22	
DF	ENG	Ian Dawes	42	1	10	1	52	2
DF	ENG	Steve Wicks	29	1	10		39	1
MF	ENG	Gary Chivers	12		1		14	
MF	ENG	David Kerslake	9		3	3	17	3
MF	ENG	John Gregory	11		1		12	
MF	ENG	Martin Allen	26	3	6		39	3
MF	DEN	Kurt Bakholt					1	
MF	IRE	Gary Waddock	15		3		18	
MF	ENG	Mike Fillery	17		5	1	22	1
FW	ENG	Gary Bannister	36	16	10	2	46	18
FW	WAL	Robbie James	25	1	7		36	1
FW	ENG	Wayne Fereday	30	2	6		41	2
FW	ENG	Leroy Rosenior	12	4	1	2	22	6
FW	IRE	John Byrne	30	12	8	3	45	15
FW	ENG	Clive Walker	5	1			5	1
FW	IRE	Michael Robinson	24	3	5	1	30	4

== Transfers Out ==
Name	from	Date	Fee	Date	Club	Fee
Ian Stewart	Queens Park Rangers Juniors	May 9, 1980		August 1985	Newcastle United	£150,000
Steve Burke	Nottingham Forest	September 1979	£125,000	August 1985	Lincoln City	Loan
Gary Cooper	Queens Park Rangers Juniors	June 2, 1983		September 1985	Brentford	Loan
John Gregory	Brighton & Hove Albion	June 1981	£300,000	November 1985	Derby County	£150,000
Gary Cooper	Queens Park Rangers Juniors	June 2, 1983		Mar 86	Torquay	Free
Stephen Scott		Dec1984		Mar 86	Friska Viljor (Swe)	Free
Mark Loram	Torquay	Apr 17,1986	Loan	May 86	Torquay	Loan
Billy Beggs	Queens Park Rangers Juniors	July1985		June 86	Charlton	Free

== Transfers In ==
Name	from	Date	Fee
Billy Beggs	Queens Park Rangers Juniors	July1985	
Paul Barron	West Bromwich Albion	August 1985	£40,000
Leroy Rosenior	Fulham	Aug 16,1985	£100,000
Gavin Maguire	Queens Park Rangers Juniors	October 1985	
Clive Walker	Sunderland	Dec 13,1985	£75,000
Paul Davis		Dec1985	
Jimmy Carter	Crystal Palace	Dec 10,1985	Free
Kurt Bakholt	Vejle BK	Jan 22,1986	
Mark Loram	Torquay	Apr 17,1986	Loan
Mark Loram	Torquay	May 12, 1986	£40,000
Alan Brazil	Coventry City	June 3, 1986	£200,000
