= 1983–84 Queens Park Rangers F.C. season =

English football club season

Queens Park Rangers
1983–84 season
- Manager: Terry Venables Until May 20th, Alan Mullery from June 20th
- Stadium: Loftus Road
- First Division: 5th
- FA Cup: Third round
- League Cup: Third round
- Top goalscorer: League: Clive Allen (14); All: Simon Stainrod (16)
- Highest home attendance: 27,140 (v Liverpool, 22 October 1983)
- Lowest home attendance: 8,911 (v Crewe Alexandra, 4 October 1983)
- Average home league attendance: 15,560
- Biggest win: 8-1 Vs Crewe Alexandra, 4 October 1983)
- Biggest defeat: 0-3 Vs Crewe Alexandra (25 October 1983)
Home colours	Away colours

During the 1983–84 English football season, Queens Park Rangers competed in the First Division, having been promoted as the Second Division champions the previous season.

== Season summary ==
QPR enjoyed an excellent season upon their return to the First Division, With a six game First Division season Longest winning run finishing fifth and qualifying for the UEFA Cup. At the end of the season, their manager Terry Venables left to manage Barcelona; he was replaced by the Crystal Palace manager Alan Mullery.

== Kit ==
QPR's kits were manufactured by Adidas, who introduced a new kit for the season. The kits also bore sponsorship for the first time, with Rangers receiving sponsorship from Guinness.

== League Table ==
Pos	Team	Pld	W	D	L	GF	GA	GD	Pts	Qualification or relegation
3	Nottingham Forest	42	22	8	12	76	45	+31	74	Qualification for the UEFA Cup first round
4	Manchester United	42	20	14	8	71	41	+30	74	Qualification for the UEFA Cup first round
5	Queens Park Rangers	42	22	7	13	67	37	+30	73	Qualification for the UEFA Cup first round
6	Arsenal	42	18	9	15	74	60	+14	63	
7	Everton	42	16	14	12	44	42	+2	62	Qualification for the European Cup Winners' Cup first round (Note: Everton qualified for the European Cup Winners' Cup as the 1983–84 FA Cup winners.)

Source: World Football
Rules for classification: 1) Points; 2) Goal difference; 3) Goals scored

== Results ==
QPR scores given first

Win Draw Loss'

=== Football League First Division ===
Date	Opponents	Venue	Result F–A	Scorers	Attendance	Position
27 August 1983	Manchester United	A	1–3	Allen 55'	48,742	19
29 August 1983	Southampton	A	0–0		19,522	17
3 September 1983	Aston Villa	H	2–1	Stainrod 4', Withe og 67'	16,922	13
6 September 1983	Watford	H	1–1	Stainrod	17,111	13
10 September 1983	Nottingham Forest	A	2–3	Dawes, Stainrod	14,607	16
17 September 1983	Sunderland	H	3–0	Fenwick (pen), Stainrod, Allen	12,929	13
24 September 1983	Wolverhampton Wanderers	A	4–0	Allen (2), Gregory, Stainrod	11,511	9
1 October 1983	Arsenal	H	2–0	Gregory, Neill	26,293	5
15 October 1983	Ipswich Town	A	2–0	Stainrod, Gregory	17,959	3
22 October 1983	Liverpool	H	0–1		27,140	6
29 October 1983	Norwich City	A	3–0	Fenwick (2; 1 pen), Stainrod	16,532	3
5 November 1983	Luton Town	H	0–1		15,853	6
12 November 1983	Coventry City	A	0–1		11,755	9
19 November 1983	Birmingham City	H	2–1	Stainrod, Fenwick	10,824	7
26 November 1983	Tottenham Hotspur	A	2–3	Stainrod, Fenwick (pen)	38,789	10
3 December 1983	Notts County	H	1–0	Waddock	10,217	9
10 December 1983	West Bromwich Albion	H	2–1	Fenwick, Stainrod	11,717	5
17 December 1983	Everton	H	2–0	Charles (2)	11,608	4
24 December 1983	Leicester City	A	1–2	Fenwick (pen)	17,440	8
31 December 1983	Aston Villa	A	1–2	Charles 53'	19,978	9
2 January 1984	Wolverhampton Wanderers	H	2–1	Wicks, Gregory	12,875	8
13 January 1984	Manchester United	H	1–1	Fenwick 42'	16,309	7
17 January 1984	Stoke City	H	6–0	Charles (2), Stainrod, Gregory, Stewart, Fillery	9,320	4
21-Jan-1984	Sunderland	A	PP			
4 February 1984	Arsenal	A	2–0	Stewart, Fenwick	31,014	5
7 February 1984	West Ham United	H	1–1	Stainrod	20,102	5
11 February 1984	Nottingham Forest	H	0–1		16,692	5
14 February 1984	Norwich City	H	2–0	Dawes, Waddock	12,901	5
25 February 1984	Liverpool	A	0-2		32,206	6
3 March 1984	Luton Town	A	0–0		11,922	6
7 March 1984	Sunderland	A	0–1		13,538	6
10 March 1984	Coventry City	H	2–1	Stainrod, Allen	10,284	6
17 March 1984	Watford	A	0–1		18,645	6
24 March 1984	Southampton	H	4–0	Wicks, Micklewhite, Allen, Waddock	15,407	6
31 March 1984	West Ham United	A	2–2	Allen (2)	21,099	6
7 April 1984	Ipswich Town	H	1–0	Allen	12,251	4
14 April 1984	Birmingham City	A	2–0	Gregory, Fenwick	10,255	4
21 April 1984	Leicester City	H	2–0	Allen, Fereday	12,360	4
23 April 1984	Stoke City	A	2–1	Allen, Fereday	15,735	3
28 April 1984	Tottenham Hotspur	H	2–1	Fereday, Gregory	24,937	3
5 May 1984	Notts County	A	3–0	Allen (3)	7,309	3
7 May 1984	West Bromwich Albion	H	1–1	Fereday	14,418	3
12 May 1984	Everton	A	1–3	Micklewhite	20,679	5

=== FA Cup ===
Round	Date	Opponent	Venue	Result F–A	Scorers	Attendance
R3	7 January 1984	Huddersfield Town (Second Division)	A	1–2	Gregory	11,924

=== Milk Cup ===
Round	Date	Opponent	Venue	Result F–A	Scorers	Attendance
R2 1st leg	4 October 1983	Crewe Alexandra (Fourth Division)	H	8–1	Stainrod (3), Waddock, Allen, Stewart, Micklewhite, McDonald	8,911
R2 2nd leg	25 October 1983	Crewe Alexandra (Fourth Division)	A	0–3 (won 8–4 on agg)		3,662
R3	9 November 1983	Ipswich Town (First Division)	A	2–3	Stewart 33', Gregory 87'	12,341

=== Friendlies ===
Date	Country	Opponents	Venue	Result F–A	Scorers	Attendance
6-Aug-1983	Scotland	Hibernian	A	2-1		
8-Aug-1983	Scotland	Motherwell	A			
10-Aug-1983	Scotland	Dundee	A			
13-Aug-1983	Scotland	St Mirren	A	2-3	Allen, Stainrod	
16-Aug-83		Crystal Palace	A			
20-Aug-83		Chelsea	A			
22-Aug-83	Greece	AEK Athens	A			
18-Oct-83	Micky Howell Memorial	Hayes	A	4-1		
15-Nov-83	Denis Piggott Testimonial	Brentford	A			
27-Jan-84		Fulham	A	3-0	Stainrod 3	
19-Feb-84	Oman	Oman	A			
21-Feb-84	Oman	Oman	A			
30-Apr-84	Paul Hinshlewood Testimonial	Crystal Palace	A			
22-May-84	Indonesia	Indonesian FA	A	3-2	Kerslake, Stainrod, Fenwick	
25-May-84	Indonesia	Feyenoord	A	1-3	Allen	

== Squad ==
Position	Nationality	Name	League Appearances	League Goals	Cup Appearances	Milk Cup Goals	F.A.Cup Goals	Total Appearances	Total Goals
GK	(England)	Peter Hucker	42		4			46	
DF	(England)	Ian Dawes	42	2	4			44	4
DF	(England)	Glenn Roeder	1					1	
DF	(England)	Terry Fenwick	41	10	4			45	10
DF	(England)	Steve Wicks	31	2	1			32	2
DF	(Jamaica)	Bob Hazell	6						
DF	(Northern Ireland)	Alan McDonald	5		3	1		8	1
DF	(England)	Warren Neill	41	1	3			44	1
MF	(England)	Wayne Fereday	11(7)	4	1			19	4
MF	(England)	Mike Fillery	29(2)	1	2			33	1
MF	(England)	John Gregory	37	7	3	1	1	40	9
MF	(England)	Gary Micklewhite	27(3)	2	3	1		33	3
MF	(Republic of Ireland)	Gary Waddock	36	2	4	1		40	3
FW	(England)	Clive Allen	24(1)	14	3	1		28	15
FW	(England)	Simon Stainrod	41	13	4	3		45	16
FW	(Northern Ireland)	Ian Stewart	30(1)	2	4	2		35	4
FW	(England)	Steve Burke	1(4)					5	
FW	(England)	Tony Sealy	6(3)					9	
FW	(England)	Mike Flanagan	1(4)					5	
FW	(Wales)	Jeremy Charles	10(2)	4	1			13	4

== Transfers Out ==
Name	from	Date	Fee	Date	Club	Fee
Martin Duffield	Queens Park Rangers Juniors	January 1982		September 1983	Bournemouth	Loan
Bob Hazell	Wolverhampton Wanderers	September 1, 1979	£240,000	September 1983	Leicester City	£100,000
Mark O'Connor	Queens Park Rangers Juniors	June 1980		October 1983	Exeter City	Loan
Steve Burke	Nottingham Forest	September 1979	£125,000	October 1983	Millwall	Loan
Glenn Roeder	Leyton Orient F.C.	August 10, 1978	£250,000	November 1983	Notts County	Loan
Glenn Roeder	Leyton Orient F.C.	August 10, 1978	£250,000	December 1983	Newcastle United	£125,000
Tony Sealy	Crystal Palace	March 12, 1981	£80,000	December 1983	Fulham	Loan
Tony Sealy	Crystal Palace	March 12, 1981	£80,000	December 1983	Fulham	£80,000
Mike Flanagan	Crystal Palace	December 15, 1980	£150,000	January 1984	Charlton	£50,000
Tony Simmons	Sheffield W	November 15, 1983	£50,000	June 1984	Rotherham	£50,000

== Transfers In ==
Name	from	Date	Fee
Mike Fillery	Chelsea	August 17, 1983	£200,000
Jeremy Charles	Swansea City	November 28, 1983	£100,000
Tony Simmons	Sheffield W	November 15, 1983	£50,000
Gary Chivers	Swansea City	February 3, 1984	Free
