= David Pizanti =

Israeli footballer

Personal information
- Date of birth: 27 May 1962 (age 64)
- Place of birth: Pardes Hanna-Karkur, Israel
- Positions: Left-back; forward

Youth career
- 1978–1979: Hapoel Hadera

Senior career*
Years	Team	Apps	(Gls)
1979–1985	Maccabi Netanya		
1985–1987	1. FC Köln	19	(0)
1987	Hapoel Tel Aviv		
1987–1989	Queens Park Rangers	22	(0)
1989–1991	Maccabi Netanya	59	(2)
1991–1992	Hapoel Tzafririm Holon		
1992–1993	Hapoel Haifa		
1994–1995	Hapoel Petah Tikva	1	(0)
1995–1996	Ironi Rishon LeZion		

International career
1983–1989	Israel	30	(0)

Managerial career
- 2008: Maccabi Netanya (assistant)
- * Club domestic league appearances and goals

David Pizanti (Hebrew: דוד פיזנטי; born 27 May 1962) is an Israeli former professional footballer who began his career as a forward with Hapoel Hadera but was converted to a left back at Maccabi Netanya. He also played for 1. FC Köln, Queens Park Rangers and Hapoel Haifa before his career was ended prematurely by injury.
