= John Gregory (footballer) =

English football player and manager

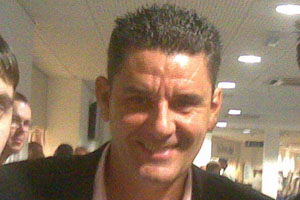
- Gregory with Malappuram

Personal information
- Full name: John Charles Gregory
- Date of birth: 11 May 1954 (age 72)
- Place of birth: Scunthorpe, England
- Height: 6 ft 1 in (1.85 m)
- Position: Midfielder

Senior career*
Years	Team	Apps	(Gls)
1972–1977	Northampton Town	187	(8)
1977–1979	Aston Villa	65	(10)
1979–1981	Brighton & Hove Albion	72	(7)
1981–1985	Queens Park Rangers	161	(36)
1985–1988	Derby County	103	(22)
1990	Plymouth Argyle	3	(0)
1990	Bolton Wanderers	7	(0)
Total		598	(83)

International career
1983–1984	England	6	(0)

Managerial career
- 1989–1990: Portsmouth
- 1990: Plymouth Argyle (caretaker)
- 1996–1998: Wycombe Wanderers
- 1998–2002: Aston Villa
- 2002–2003: Derby County
- 2006–2007: Queens Park Rangers
- 2009–2010: Maccabi Ahi Nazareth
- 2010–2011: Ashdod
- 2011: Kairat
- 2013–2014: Crawley Town
- 2017–2019: Chennaiyin
- 2024: Malappuram
- * Club domestic league appearances and goals

John Charles Gregory (born 11 May 1954) is an English former football player and manager. He was most recently the head coach of Super League Kerala side Malappuram.

As a player, he was a versatile midfielder who started his career at Northampton Town and later played for Brighton & Hove Albion, Queens Park Rangers, Derby County and Aston Villa. He won six caps for England.

He later managed Portsmouth, Plymouth Argyle, Wycombe Wanderers, Aston Villa, Derby County, Queens Park Rangers, Maccabi Ahi Nazareth, Ashdod, Kairat, Crawley Town and Chennaiyin.

== Playing career ==
Gregory was born in Scunthorpe, Lincolnshire, where his father, Jack Gregory, was playing for Scunthorpe United. Gregory made his professional football debut in 1972, at the age of 18, when playing for Northampton Town. He scored eight goals in 187 games over the next five years, before being transferred to First Division Aston Villa in 1977.

Gregory was a considerable success at Aston Villa. Despite playing two divisions higher than he had ever done before, he adapted well to First Division football and scored 10 goals in 65 games over the next two seasons. During his time at Villa, Gregory became the first player to play in every outfield position, wearing every number from 2 to 11 over his two seasons with the club.

In 1979, Gregory signed for Brighton & Hove Albion, who had just won promotion to the First Division for the first time in their history. He scored seven goals in 72 games over the next two seasons, before dropping down into the Second Division to sign for Queen's Park Rangers.

He was part of the QPR side that reached the FA Cup final in 1982 (losing to Tottenham Hotspur in a replay) and won promotion to the First Division a year later as Second Division champions. He also helped QPR finish fifth and qualify for the UEFA Cup in 1984, but 1984–85 was a tough season for Gregory and his colleagues after manager Terry Venables departed to Barcelona and successor Frank Sibley was unable to keep up QPR's good form. At the end of a difficult season in which QPR only narrowly stayed in the First Division, Gregory dropped down two divisions to sign for fallen giants Derby County.

Derby County, champions of England in 1972 and 1975, had fallen into the Third Division in 1984 and had failed to win promotion in 1984–85. Gregory was the centerpiece of their midfield as they achieved promotion to the Second Division at the end of the 1985–86 season and to the First Division (as Second Division champions) a year later. Gregory stayed for one season as Derby County survived their first top flight season for nearly a decade, before announcing his retirement as a player. He played a total of 93 league appearances for the Rams, scoring 22 goals.

When taking over as caretaker manager of Plymouth Argyle early in 1990, Gregory re-registered himself as a player. After Argyle brought in Dave Kemp as a permanent manager, he stayed and played three games for the club. On departing from the Home Park club, he moved 300 miles north to play for Third Division Bolton Wanderers, making seven appearances before finally retiring as a player at the age of 36.

== Managerial career ==
Gregory started his management career in the 1970s as a player/manager of amateur teams in Northamptonshire.

His first two professional spells in management (between January 1989 and June 1990), first with Portsmouth and then with Plymouth Argyle did not last long, with the latter being a caretaker appointment for just 2 games. Shortly afterwards, he linked up as a non-contract player with his former England and Northampton Town teammate Phil Neal, who was then manager at Bolton Wanderers.

Gregory later worked under Brian Little on the coaching staff at Leicester City (1991–1994) and Aston Villa (1994–96) before moving back into management with Wycombe Wanderers in September 1996. Wycombe were bottom of Division Two when Gregory took over, but he oversaw a massive improvement in league form which saw the club climb up to a secure mid-table finish. However, the side also suffered an embarrassing FA Cup exit to Basingstoke Town. Wycombe were performing well in February 1998 when Gregory quit to take the manager's job back at Aston Villa.

== Aston Villa ==
Gregory influenced a late run of form which saw Villa climb to seventh place, and for the second season running Villa qualified for the UEFA Cup via the UEFA Respect Fair Play ranking.

Early in the 1998–99 season Villa lost Dwight Yorke to Manchester United. Gregory was quoted at the time "If I'd had a gun I would have shot him." Halfway through the season, Villa were Premiership leaders but a slump in form saw the club eventually finish sixth in the final table and miss out on a first Premiership title. Villa reached the FA Cup final in 2000 but lost to Chelsea. Gregory quit in January 2002, with Villa going on to finish eighth that season.

== Later career ==
Gregory's next spell in management was with Derby County (January 2002 – March 2003). When he took charge at Derby they were bottom of the Premiership, but after winning both of his first two games at the helm it looked as though he might be able to save them from relegation. Unfortunately, seven defeats from their final eight fixtures saw Derby slip out of the Premiership after six years. The club's financial problems meant that Gregory hadn't purchased any players during the 2002–03 season, and their subsequent form in Division One was disappointing.

He was dismissed in March 2003 for alleged misconduct but later won £1 million in compensation for unfair dismissal. Due to the ongoing lawsuit, Gregory was unable to apply for another managerial position for some time, so he spent most of the next three years working as a television pundit.

On 20 September 2006, he was unveiled as manager of Queens Park Rangers. He replaced Gary Waddock, who had stepped down following a poor succession of results that had left the club bottom of the Football League Championship. This appointment caused a schism among QPR fans, some of whom saw Gregory's friendship with controversial chairman Gianni Paladini as a conflict of interest. After a decent start with successive victories over Hull City and Southampton, Rangers form dipped before winning three consecutive matches (including a victory at (then) league leaders Cardiff City). However, results did not continue to improve, and relegation looked a distinct possibility for Gregory's team. But following a fine late season run, QPR defeated Cardiff 1–0 at Loftus Road on 21 April 2007 to secure their Championship status for another year. Gregory was dismissed as QPR manager on 1 October 2007, after some poor performances.

On 8 December 2009, Gregory was appointed the manager of Israeli club Maccabi Ahi Nazareth.

On 18 May 2010, Gregory signed a three-year contract with Israeli Premier League Club Ashdod. He resigned from Ashdod on 18 April 2011, with the club facing the possibility of relegation.

On 13 June 2011, Gregory was appointed the manager of Kazakh club Kairat from Almaty, Kazakhstan. Kairat survived relegation at the end of the 2011 season to the second tier of Kazakhstan football.

Gregory had his contract as manager of Kairat terminated in December 2011, and in April 2012 was paid $120,000 in compensation.

On 3 December 2013, Gregory was named as the manager of Crawley Town, replacing previous manager Richie Barker.

On 27 December 2014, after being Crawley Town manager for just over a year Gregory stepped down as manager due to health problems; on the same day Crawley Town named Welsh former international and former Wolverhampton Wanderers manager Dean Saunders as interim manager.

On 3 July 2017, Gregory signed as head coach of Chennaiyin in the Indian Super League.

On 17 March 2018, he led Chennaiyin to their second Indian Super League title by defeating Bengaluru 3–2 in the finals. On 19 March 2018, Gregory extended his contract for one year; he later resigned after a poor run of form in the 2019-20 season.

== Playing statistics ==
Appearances and goals by club, season and competition
Club	Season	League			FA Cup		League Cup		Europe		Total	
Club	Season	Division	Apps	Goals	Apps	Goals	Apps	Goals	Apps	Goals	Apps	Goals
Northampton Town	1972–73	Fourth Division	9	0								
Northampton Town	1973–74	Fourth Division	46	0								
Northampton Town	1974–75	Fourth Division	41	1								
Northampton Town	1975–76	Fourth Division	45	3								
Northampton Town	1976–77	Third Division	46	4								
Northampton Town	Total		187	8								
Aston Villa	1977–78	First Division	26	3								
Aston Villa	1978–79	First Division	39	7								
Aston Villa	Total		65	10								
Brighton & Hove Albion	1979–80	First Division	33	0								
Brighton & Hove Albion	1980–81	First Division	39	7								
Brighton & Hove Albion	Total		72	7								
Queens Park Rangers	1981–82	Second Division	34	9								
Queens Park Rangers	1982–83	Second Division	42	15								
Queens Park Rangers	1983–84	First Division	37	7								
Queens Park Rangers	1984–85	First Division	37	5								
Queens Park Rangers	1985–86	First Division	11	0								
Queens Park Rangers	Total		161	36								
Derby County	1985–86	Third Division	22	4								
Derby County	1986–87	Second Division	42	12								
Derby County	1987–88	First Division	39	6								
Derby County	Total		103	22								
Portsmouth	1988–89	Second Division	0	0								
Portsmouth	1989–90	Second Division	0	0								
Portsmouth	Total		0	0								
Plymouth Argyle	1989–90	Second Division	3	0								
Bolton Wanderers	1989–90	Third Division	7	0								
Career total			598	83								

== Managerial statistics ==
As of 30 November 2019

Club	Country	From	To	P	W	D	L	Win%
Portsmouth	England	1989	1990	50	10	15	25	20.00
Wycombe Wanderers	England	1996	1998	76	25	23	28	32.89
Aston Villa	England	1998	2002	190	82	52	56	43.16
Derby County	England	2002	2003	55	16	9	30	29.09
Queens Park Rangers	England	2006	2007	48	13	12	23	27.08
Maccabi Ahi Nazareth	Israel	2009	2010	23	4	7	12	17.39
Ashdod	Israel	2010	2011	30	8	10	12	26.67
Kairat	Kazakhstan	2011	2011	17	4	6	7	23.53
Crawley Town	England	2013	2014	57	17	16	24	29.82
Chennaiyin	India	2017	2019	59	21	15	23	35.59
Total				605	200	165	240	33.06

== Honours ==
=== Player ===
Queens Park Rangers

- FA Cup runner-up: 1981–82

Individual

- PFA Team of the Year: 1986–87 Second Division

=== Manager ===
Aston Villa

- UEFA Intertoto Cup: 2001

Chennaiyin

- Indian Super League: 2017–18

Individual

- Premier League Manager of the Month: September 1998, September 2001
- Indian Super League Coach of the Year: 2017–18
