= Dean Coney =

English footballer (born 1963)

Personal information
- Full name: Dean Henry Coney
- Date of birth: 18 September 1963 (age 63)
- Place of birth: Dagenham, England
- Height: 6 ft 0 in (1.83 m)
- Position: Forward

Senior career*
Years	Team	Apps	(Gls)
1980–1987	Fulham	211	(56)
1987–1989	Queens Park Rangers	48	(7)
1989–1990	Norwich City	17	(1)
1990–1991	Ernest Borel		

International career
1984–1987	England U21	4	(1)
- * Club domestic league appearances and goals

Dean Henry Coney (born 18 September 1963) is an English former professional footballer who played as a forward for Fulham, Queens Park Rangers and Norwich City.

A cruciate ligament injury at Norwich ended his professional career, after which he played briefly in Hong Kong before playing non-league football back in England with Farnborough Town and Carshalton Athletic. He went on to manage Farnborough and was most recently assistant manager at Dagenham & Redbridge.

== Career ==
Coney began his career with Fulham, making his debut at the age of 17. He showed great promise and scored 19 goals in his first full season. He was capped by England under-21s. However, he was unable to maintain his early scoring rate and moved to QPR, who paid £200,000 for him in 1987. He failed to settle at Loftus Road, due partly to the fact that manager Trevor Francis often played him in midfield.

Towards the end of the 1988–89 season, Norwich manager Dave Stringer paid £350,000 for Coney. Norwich were enjoying an excellent season and were in with a chance of winning the first division championship. Stringer felt that Coney would score the extra goals that were needed, though Coney had failed to score in his 16 games that season for QPR. However, his time at Carrow Road was neither happy nor productive for Coney. He scored just one goal, which was a fortuitous one - in a league match against Aston Villa at Carrow Road on 22 April 1989 he charged down a clearance by Villa goalkeeper Nigel Spink and the ball rebounded off Coney's backside and into the goal. His performances became lacklustre and the supporters were very critical of Coney. The transfer fee was, at the time, one of the highest that Norwich had paid for a player, but little return on it was received. He was frequently heckled during matches and at length handed in a transfer request, stating "the fans have it in for me." Coney suffered his cruciate injury in a reserve match before he was able to find another club.

After a brief spell with Hong Kong team Ernest Borel he joined Farnborough where he eventually became player-manager. He moved to Carshalton where a serious knee injury ended his days as a player. He returned to Farnborough as temporary manager in 1999 and then first team coach. He was appointed assistant manager at Redbridge in 2005.

== Sources ==
- Mark Davage; John Eastwood; Kevin Platt (2001). Canary Citizens. Jarrold Publishing. ISBN 0-7117-2020-7.
