= Doug McClure (footballer) =

English footballer (born 1964)

Personal information
- Full name: Douglas Hugh McClure
- Date of birth: 6 September 1964 (age 62)
- Place of birth: Islington, England
- Position: Left back

Senior career*
Years	Team	Apps	(Gls)
1983–1984	Queens Park Rangers	0	(0)
1984	Exeter City	1	(0)
1984–1985	Torquay United	4	(0)
1985	Wimbledon	2	(0)
1985	Peterborough United	4	(0)
1985–1986	Crewe Alexandra	3	(0)
1986–1987	Wealdstone	47	(0)
1987–1988	Enfield	33	(1)
1988–1989	Fisher Athletic	31	(0)
Total		125	(1)

International career
1982	England U17	4	(0)
1982	England Youth	6	(0)
- * Club domestic league appearances and goals

Douglas Hugh McClure (born 6 September 1964) is an English former professional footballer who played in the Football League as a defender.
