= 1989–90 Bolton Wanderers F.C. season =

Bolton Wanderers
1989–90 season
- Manager: Phil Neal
- Stadium: Burnden Park
- Third Division: 6th
- FA Cup: 1st Round
- Littlewoods Cup: 3rd Round
- Leyland DAF Cup: Northern Section Semi Final
- Top goalscorer: League: Tony Philliskirk (18); All: Tony Philliskirk (23; 18 league, 5 cup)
- Highest home attendance: 15,105 v Notts County; 13 May 1990
- Lowest home attendance: 3,868 v Crewe Alexandra; 29 November 1989

The 1989–1990 season was the 111th season in Bolton Wanderers F.C.'s existence and their second successive season in the Football League Third Division. The season lasted from 1 July 1989 to 30 June 1990.

== League table ==
| Pos | Team | Pld | W | D | L | GF | GA | GD | Pts | Promotion or relegation |
|---|---|---|---|---|---|---|---|---|---|---|
| 4 | Tranmere Rovers | 46 | 23 | 11 | 12 | 86 | 49 | +37 | 80 | Qualification for the Third Division play-offs |
| 5 | Bury | 46 | 21 | 11 | 14 | 70 | 49 | +21 | 74 | Qualification for the Third Division play-offs |
| 6 | Bolton Wanderers | 46 | 18 | 15 | 13 | 59 | 48 | +11 | 69 | Qualification for the Third Division play-offs |
| 7 | Birmingham City | 46 | 18 | 12 | 16 | 60 | 59 | +1 | 66 | |
| 8 | Huddersfield Town | 46 | 17 | 14 | 15 | 61 | 62 | −1 | 65 | |

== Cup results ==
Bolton Wanderers made it to the third round of the League Cup. They defeated Rochdale in the first round and Watford in the second. They forced a replay against Swindon Town in the third round, but lost 3-2 on aggregate in the replay. They lost in the first round of the FA Cup to Blackpool.
