= Gary Bannister =

English footballer

Personal information
- Date of birth: 22 July 1960 (age 66)
- Place of birth: Warrington, Lancashire, England
- Height: 5 ft 7 in (1.70 m)
- Position: Striker

Senior career*
Years	Team	Apps	(Gls)
1978–1981	Coventry City	22	(3)
1980	→ Detroit Express (loan)	22	(10)
1981–1984	Sheffield Wednesday	118	(55)
1984–1988	Queens Park Rangers	136	(56)
1988–1990	Coventry City	43	(11)
1990–1992	West Bromwich Albion	72	(18)
1992	→ Oxford United (loan)	10	(2)
1992–1993	Nottingham Forest	31	(8)
1993	Stoke City	15	(2)
1993–1994	Hong Kong Rangers		
1994–1995	Lincoln City	29	(7)
1995–1996	Darlington	41	(10)
1996-2001	Porthleven		
Total		539	(182)

International career
1982	England U21	1	(0)
- * Club domestic league appearances and goals

Gary Bannister (born 22 July 1960) is an English former professional footballer who played for Coventry City (two spells), Sheffield Wednesday, Queens Park Rangers, West Bromwich Albion, Oxford United, Nottingham Forest, Stoke City, Lincoln City and Darlington.

He had a long 17-year career lasting from 1978 to 1995 during which time he made 564 appearances in league and cup matches plus 42 as substitute. Bannister played as a striker, and at just 5 foot 7 inches (170 cm) tall and weighing little over 11 stone (70 kg) he relied on his pace and skill to score 199 career goals in all competitions. He made one appearance for the England Under 21 team against Poland in April 1982.

== Early life ==
Bannister was born in Warrington, then in Lancashire. His father Gordon was a school caretaker and his sister Julie, played Hockey, representing England at the 1986 World Cup Finals in Holland.

== Career ==
Bannister joined Coventry City as an apprentice and graduated through their youth team to make his first team debut in May 1978. He made only 22 appearances, scoring three goals in over three years for Coventry City before moving to Sheffield Wednesday in a £100,000 deal in the summer of 1981. Bannister was a crowd favourite at Wednesday, he was top scorer in each of the three seasons he was there with 22 goals in each campaign. In his first season (1981–82) he was voted Player of the Year, and represented England at under-21 level. In 1983–84 he formed a feared partnership with Imre Varadi; the pair scored 41 goals between them as Wednesday returned to the First Division for the first time in 14 years.

Bannister never played for Wednesday in Division One as he left to join Queens Park Rangers as a replacement for Clive Allen in the summer of 1984. He enjoyed considerable success at QPR, relishing playing on their "plastic pitch" at Loftus Road. He made 168 appearances, scoring 66 goals in his three and a half seasons with them - though in November 1985, Ron Atkinson's Manchester United approached Rangers in a transfer deal which was rejected by Qpr.

Highlights whilst at Qpr included two hat-tricks against Chelsea. The first came in the 6–0 demolition of their local rivals on 31 March 1986 at Loftus Road and the second in the 3–1 win on 12 September 1987 also at Loftus Road. He returned to Coventry City in March 1988 in a £300,000 deal. His second spell at Coventry lasted two years and was not a great success as he scored 13 goals in 44 appearances before moving to West Bromwich Albion for £250,000 in March 1990 where he stayed until the summer of 1992, making 66 appearances and scoring 19 goals.

Bannister's latter years as a professional included spells at Oxford United (on loan), Nottingham Forest (where, partnering Nigel Clough, he was unable the stop the team being relegated from the Premier League), Stoke City, Lincoln City and Darlington before retiring at the end of the 1995–96 season. He also spent one year (1993–1994) playing for Hong Kong Rangers.

After retiring, he moved to St Ives, Cornwall becoming involved in hotel maintenance and property development. He played for and coached Porthleven in the South Western Football League for several seasons. After about ten years in Cornwall, Bannister and family returned to the Midlands and a job in hotel maintenance in Birmingham.

== Career statistics ==
Club	Season	League			FA Cup		League Cup		Other^{[A]}		Total	
Club	Season	Division	Apps	Goals	Apps	Goals	Apps	Goals	Apps	Goals	Apps	Goals
Coventry City	1978–79	First Division	4	1	0	0	1	0	0	0	5	1
Coventry City	1979–80	First Division	7	0	0	0	0	0	0	0	7	0
Coventry City	1980–81	First Division	11	2	2	0	1	0	0	0	14	2
Coventry City	Total		22	3	2	0	2	0	0	0	26	3
Detroit Express	1980	NASL	22	10	–		–		–		22	10
Detroit Express	Total		22	10	–		–		–		22	10
Sheffield Wednesday	1981–82	Second Division	42	21	1	0	2	1	0	0	45	22
Sheffield Wednesday	1982–83	Second Division	39	20	6	1	5	1	0	0	50	22
Sheffield Wednesday	1983–84	Second Division	37	14	5	3	6	5	0	0	48	22
Sheffield Wednesday	Total		118	55	12	4	13	7	0	0	143	66
Queens Park Rangers	1984–85	First Division	42	17	1	0	8	5	4	6	55	28
Queens Park Rangers	1985–86	First Division	36	16	1	0	9	2	0	0	45	18
Queens Park Rangers	1986–87	First Division	34	15	4	0	3	1	0	0	41	16
Queens Park Rangers	1987–88	First Division	24	8	3	1	3	1	0	0	30	10
Queens Park Rangers	Total		136	56	9	1	23	9	4	6	172	72
Coventry City	1987–88	First Division	8	1	0	0	0	0	0	0	8	1
Coventry City	1988–89	First Division	24	8	0	0	3	2	0	0	27	10
Coventry City	1989–90	First Division	11	2	0	0	2	0	0	0	13	2
Coventry City	Total		43	11	0	0	5	2	0	0	48	13
West Bromwich Albion	1989–90	Second Division	13	2	0	0	0	0	0	0	13	2
West Bromwich Albion	1990–91	Second Division	44	13	1	0	2	1	1	1	48	15
West Bromwich Albion	1991–92	Third Division	15	3	1	0	2	0	2	0	20	3
West Bromwich Albion	Total		72	18	2	0	4	1	3	1	81	20
Oxford United (loan)	1991–92	Second Division	10	2	0	0	0	0	0	0	10	2
Nottingham Forest	1992–93	Premier League	31	8	3	1	3	1	0	0	37	10
Stoke City	1993–94	First Division	15	2	2	0	0	0	1	0	18	2
Lincoln City	1994–95	Third Division	29	7	2	1	2	0	1	0	34	8
Darlington	1995–96	Third Division	41	10	3	1	2	0	5	0	51	8
Career Total			539	182	35	8	54	20	14	7	642	217

A. The "Other" column constitutes appearances and goals in the Anglo-Italian Cup, Football League Trophy, Full Members Cup and UEFA Cup.

== Honours ==
Queens Park Rangers

- Football League Cup runner-up: 1985–86
