= Gary Micklewhite =

English footballer

Personal information
- Full name: Gary Micklewhite
- Date of birth: 21 March 1961 (age 65)
- Place of birth: Southwark, London, England
- Height: 5 ft 7 in (1.70 m)
- Position: Midfielder

Youth career
- 1976–1979: Manchester United

Senior career*
Years	Team	Apps	(Gls)
1978–1979	Manchester United	0	(0)
1979–1985	Queens Park Rangers	97	(11)
1985–1993	Derby County	240	(31)
1993–1996	Gillingham	78	(3)
Total		415	(45)
- * Club domestic league appearances and goals

Gary Micklewhite (born 21 March 1961) is an English former professional footballer who played in the Football League for Queens Park Rangers, Derby County and Gillingham in the 1980s and early 1990s.

Born in Southwark, London, Micklewhite began his career as a schoolboy with Manchester United, signing for them in March 1976. He turned professional on 23 March 1978, but despite being a regular in the club's reserve team, he could not break into the first team and signed for Queens Park Rangers on 4 July 1979. He came on a free transfer, signed by former United boss Tommy Docherty, and made his debut in a 2-0 win against Blackburn Rovers in October 1981. Micklewhite came on as a substitute for Clive Allen in the 1982 FA Cup Final and started the replay, scoring a goal which was disallowed. In all, Micklewhite played 97 league games, scoring 11 goals for QPR before moving to Derby County in 1985.

== Honours ==
Queens Park Rangers

- FA Cup runner-up: 1981–82
