= David Kerslake =

English footballer (born 1966)

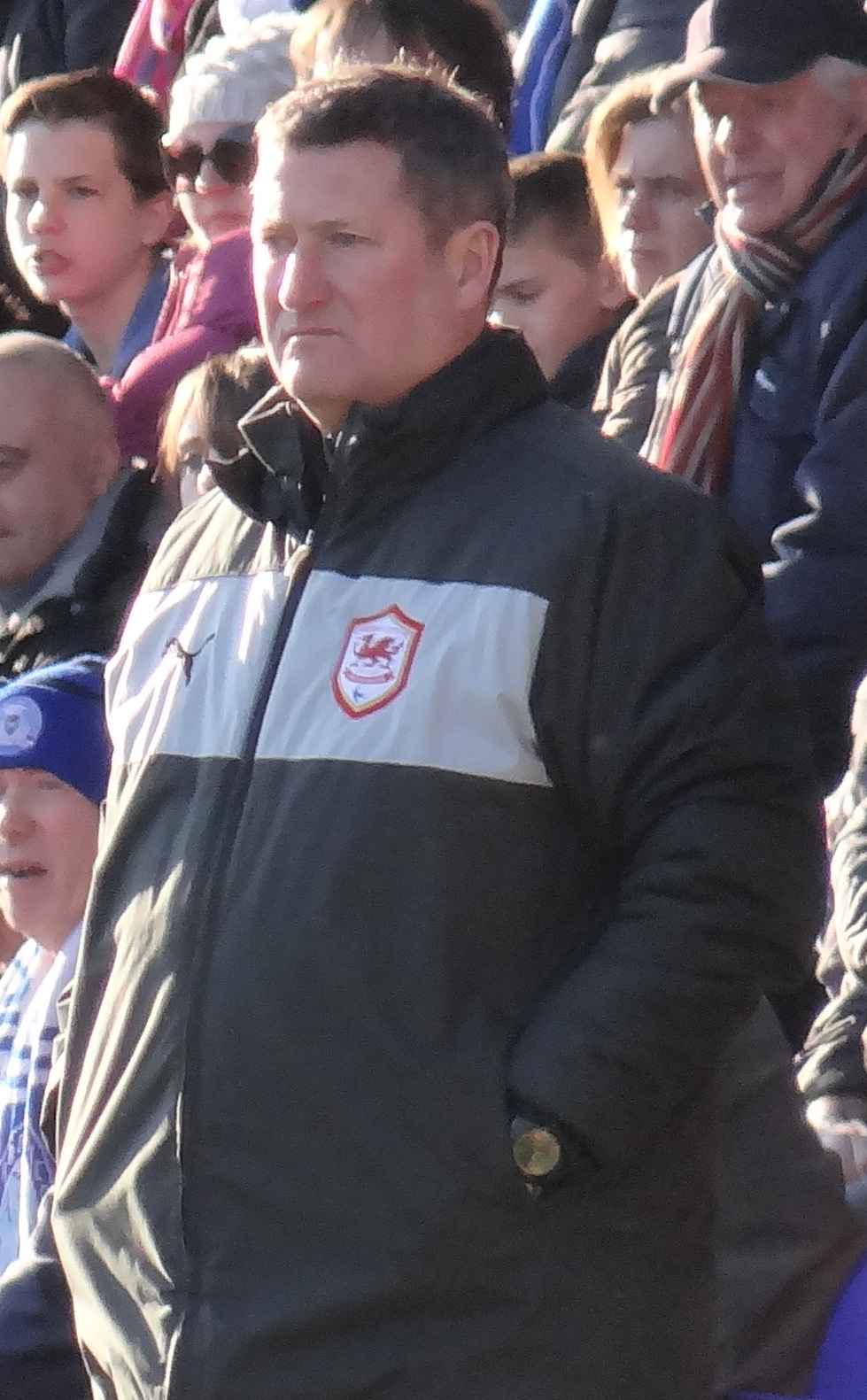
- Kerslake in 2013 with Cardiff City

Personal information
- Date of birth: 19 June 1966 (age 60)
- Place of birth: Stepney, London, England
- Height: 5 ft 8 in (1.73 m)
- Position: Right-back

Team information
- Current team: Ebbsfleet United (assistant manager)

Youth career
- 1982–1984: Queens Park Rangers

Senior career*
Years	Team	Apps	(Gls)
1984–1989	Queens Park Rangers	58	(6)
1989–1993	Swindon Town	135	(1)
1993	Leeds United	8	(0)
1993–1997	Tottenham Hotspur	37	(0)
1996–1997	→ Swindon Town (loan)	8	(0)
1997	→ Charlton Athletic (loan)	0	(0)
1997–1998	Ipswich Town	7	(0)
1997–1998	→ Wycombe Wanderers (loan)	10	(0)
1998–1999	Swindon Town	24	(0)
- Canvey Island
Total		287	(7)

International career
- England Schoolboys
1982	England U17	4	(1)
1982–1983	England Youth	21	(4)
1985	England U19	4	(1)
1985	England U21	1	(0)

Managerial career
- 2013–2014: Cardiff City (caretaker)
- 2017: Northampton Town (caretaker)
- * Club domestic league appearances and goals

David Kerslake (born 19 June 1966) is an English football coach and former player. He is assistant manager of Ebbsfleet United.

As a player, Kerslake was a right-back who notably played in the Premier League for Leeds United and Tottenham Hotspur. He also played in the Football League with Queens Park Rangers, Swindon Town, Ipswich Town and Wycombe Wanderers. He retired with non-league side Canvey Island. He was capped once by England U21.

Since retiring, Kerslake has worked as a coach for Northampton Town, Nottingham Forest and Cardiff City. In 2013 he had a brief spell as caretaker manager at Cardiff until the arrival of Ole Gunnar Solskjaer. He went on to work at Gillingham before returning to Northampton Town, where, in 2017, he was temporarily the first-team manager.

== Playing career ==
Kerslake made his debut for Queens Park Rangers against Newcastle United in April 1985. He went on to play 58 league games for Rangers, scoring six goals. He was transferred to Swindon Town in November 1989.

He moved to Leeds United, for whom he made eight appearances before moving to Tottenham Hotspur three months later. Spurs paid £450,000 for him, and he made 34 appearances over four years. He was sent on loan to Swindon and Charlton Athletic before being released, whereupon he joined Ipswich Town in 1997.

He only made a handful of appearances for Ipswich, moving on to Wycombe Wanderers and then finishing his career back at Swindon.

== Coaching career ==
Kerslake moved into coaching in 2003, becoming assistant manager at Northampton Town to former teammate Colin Calderwood. The pair reached the playoff semi finals in each of the first two seasons at the club, and in 2005–2006, their third and final season at the club, achieved automatic promotion into League One, finishing with a club-record for clean sheets with 25. He then followed Calderwood to Nottingham Forest, again as assistant manager, in the summer on 2006 after the Scot was named as Gary Megson's successor. The duo again reached the playoffs in their first season in charge (2006–2007) but were beaten on aggregate by Yeovil Town in the semi-final. Forest achieved automatic promotion to the Championship in the 2007–2008 season with a run of six wins from their remaining seven games and in the process overcame a nine-point gap with four games to go on the teams in the automatic places. Kerslake left Nottingham Forest after Calderwood's sacking in December 2008.

He was appointed first-team coach at Watford, but on 30 June 2011 was announced the new coach of Cardiff City, working as assistant manager to Malky Mackay. Following the sacking of Mackay in December 2013, Kerslake and Joe McBride were placed in charge of the first team. They were in charge until 2 January 2014, when Ole Gunnar Solskjaer was appointed as the new Cardiff City manager.

On 6 July 2015, Gillingham appointed Kerslake as Justin Edinburgh's new assistant manager.

On 15 January 2017, he was hired again by Edinburgh to be the assistant manager at Northampton Town. On 27 September 2019, he was brought in by Michael Appleton to serve as the new assistant manager of Lincoln City. On 10 June 2022, he left Lincoln City following Appleton's departure as manager. He became Appleton's assistant head coach, alongside Richard O'Donnell, at Blackpool on 21 June.

On 18 January 2023, Blackpool sacked Kerslake along with head coach Appleton.

On 12 September 2024, Kerslake was appointed assistant manager of National League club Ebbsfleet United, supporting Harry Watling.

== Honours ==
Individual

- PFA Team of the Year: 1990–91 Second Division, 1991–92 Second Division, 1992–93 First Division
