= Ian Stewart (Northern Irish footballer) =

Northern Irish footballer

Personal information
- Full name: Ian Edwin Stewart
- Date of birth: 10 September 1961 (age 65)
- Place of birth: Belfast, Northern Ireland
- Height: 5 ft 6 in (1.68 m)
- Position: Striker

Senior career*
Years	Team	Apps	(Gls)
1980–1985	Queens Park Rangers	67	(2)
1982–1983	→Millwall (loan)	11	(3)
1985–1987	Newcastle United	43	(3)
1987–1988	Portsmouth	1	(0)
1988	→ Brentford (loan)	7	(0)
1988–1992	Aldershot	101	(0)
1992	Colchester United	10	(2)
1992–1993	Harrow Borough	?	(?)

International career
1982–1987	Northern Ireland	31	(2)
- * Club domestic league appearances and goals

Ian Edwin Stewart (born 10 September 1961) is a former footballer from Northern Ireland.

== Career ==
He played as winger for Queens Park Rangers, Newcastle United, Portsmouth and Aldershot in the 1980s, as well as Colchester United in their Football Conference/FA Trophy double in the 1991–92 season, scoring several important goals during the Trophy success in particular. He made his league debut for QPR as substitute against Blackburn Rovers in October 1980. On 17 November 1982 he scored his first international and Northern Ireland's winning goal versus that year's World Cup runners up, and reigning European Champions, West Germany in a European Championship qualifying match at Windsor Park, Belfast. One year later in the return game in Hamburg he created the winning goal for Norman Whiteside in another 1–0 win.

Stewart was a crowd favourite at QPR but moved to Newcastle United in the summer of 1985 and joined Portsmouth two years later. Stewart represented Northern Ireland in the 1986 Fifa World Cup in Mexico. He was the first British footballer to be endorsed by Nike. Today he works as a grassroots development officer for the Irish Football Association. He has a keen interest in music and puts on events around Northern Ireland.

== Honours ==
=== Club ===
Queens Park Rangers

- Football League Second Division Winner (1): 1982–83

Colchester United

- Football Conference Winner (1): 1991–92
