= Simon Stainrod =

English football player and manager (born 1959)

Personal information
- Full name: Simon Allan Stainrod
- Date of birth: 1 February 1959 (age 67)
- Place of birth: Sheffield, England
- Height: 5 ft 10 in (1.78 m)
- Position: Striker

Senior career*
Years	Team	Apps	(Gls)
1975–1979	Sheffield United	67	(14)
1979–1980	Oldham Athletic	69	(21)
1980–1985	Queens Park Rangers	145	(48)
1985	Sheffield Wednesday	15	(2)
1985–1987	Aston Villa	63	(16)
1987–1988	Stoke City	28	(6)
1988–1989	Strasbourg	8	(2)
1989–1990	Rouen	22	(1)
1990–1992	Falkirk	60	(21)
1992–1993	Dundee	33	(9)
1993–1995	Ayr United	31	(4)
Total		541	(144)

International career
1977	England Youth	3	(1)

Managerial career
- 1992–1993: Dundee
- 1993–1995: Ayr United
- * Club domestic league appearances and goals

Simon Allan Stainrod (born 1 February 1959) is an English former professional footballer who played as a striker for Sheffield United, Oldham Athletic, Queens Park Rangers, Sheffield Wednesday, Aston Villa and Stoke City. He also played in France for RC Strasbourg and FC Rouen and in Scotland for Falkirk, Dundee and Ayr United.

== Career ==
Stainrod was born in Sheffield and began his career with Sheffield United, making his debut towards the end of the 1975–76 season, scoring twice in seven matches as the Blades suffered relegation to the Second Division. He spent four seasons at Bramall Lane, making 75 appearances and scoring 14 goals before he moved to Oldham Athletic in March 1979. It was at Boundary Park that Stainrod began to make a name for himself scoring 26 goals in 79 appearances which attracted the attentions of Chelsea and Queens Park Rangers. He decided to join Terry Venables' QPR in November 1980 for a fee of £270,000.

In the 1981–82 season he was a key player of the team that reached the 1982 FA Cup Final, losing 1–0 to Tottenham Hotspur after a replay, Stainrod scored a career best of 24 goals that season. In 1982–83 he helped the team win the Second Division title and then finish fifth in the First Division qualifying for Europe. After Venables left Loftus Road in 1984 for Barcelona, the side quickly fell apart under the unsuccessful reign of Alan Mullery and many players including Stainrod left the club. Stainrod signed for Sheffield Wednesday for a then club-record fee of £250,000 in February 1985, though his spell at the club was unsuccessful.

He was sold to Aston Villa for £350,000 in September 1985 and he enjoyed a spectacular debut when he scored all four goals against Exeter City in the League Cup. Despite scoring 21 goals for Villa in his first season, he struggled to get in the team in 1986–87 and the team were relegated to the Second Division.

In January 1988 he joined Mick Mills' Stoke City where he scored twice in 16 appearances in 1987–88. In 1988–89 Stainrod score five goals in 18 appearances before moving to France.

He spent the 1988–89 season in France with RC Strasbourg (eight appearances, two goals). He then spent a further spell with FC Rouen (22 appearances, 1 goal) before moving to Scotland to play for Falkirk and Ayr United and then managing Dundee in Scotland. During Stainrod's spell at Falkirk he scored from the halfway line against St Johnstone direct from a kick off.

== Post-playing career ==
He is also a FIFA-licensed football agent and is now based in Cannes, France. In 2003, he set up his own company with a couple of his friends called Matchday Media. Stainrod was working with Hatem Ben Arfa following his move to Newcastle United as his adviser.

== Career statistics ==
Appearances and goals by club, season and competition
Club	Season	League			FA Cup		League Cup		Other (Note: Includes Anglo-Scottish Cup, Football League Trophy, Full Members Cup, and UEFA Cup.)		Total	
Club	Season	Division	Apps	Goals	Apps	Goals	Apps	Goals	Apps	Goals	Apps	Goals
Sheffield United	1975–76	First Division	7	2	0	0	0	0	0	0	7	2
Sheffield United	1976–77	Second Division	21	3	0	0	1	0	1	0	23	3
Sheffield United	1977–78	Second Division	25	6	1	0	0	0	1	0	26	6
Sheffield United	1978–79	Second Division	14	3	1	0	1	0	3	0	19	3
Sheffield United	Total		67	14	2	0	2	0	5	0	75	14
Oldham Athletic	1978–79	Second Division	14	5	0	0	0	0	0	0	14	5
Oldham Athletic	1979–80	Second Division	37	11	1	0	1	0	3	3	42	14
Oldham Athletic	1980–81	Second Division	18	5	0	0	2	1	3	1	23	7
Oldham Athletic	Total		69	21	1	0	3	1	6	4	79	26
Queens Park Rangers	1980–81	Second Division	15	4	2	1	0	0	0	0	17	5
Queens Park Rangers	1981–82	Second Division	39	17	9	5	4	2	0	0	52	24
Queens Park Rangers	1982–83	Second Division	31	9	0	0	2	0	0	0	33	9
Queens Park Rangers	1983–84	First Division	41	13	1	0	3	3	0	0	45	16
Queens Park Rangers	1984–85	First Division	19	5	0	0	8	3	3	3	30	11
Queens Park Rangers	Total		145	48	12	6	17	8	3	3	177	65
Sheffield Wednesday	1984–85	First Division	9	1	0	0	0	0	0	0	9	1
Sheffield Wednesday	1985–86	First Division	6	1	0	0	0	0	0	0	6	1
Sheffield Wednesday	Total		15	2	0	0	0	0	0	0	15	2
Aston Villa	1985–86	First Division	30	10	4	2	8	9	0	0	42	21
Aston Villa	1986–87	First Division	29	6	2	0	4	0	1	0	36	6
Aston Villa	1987–88	Second Division	4	0	0	0	0	0	0	0	4	0
Aston Villa	Total		63	16	6	2	12	9	1	0	82	27
Stoke City	1987–88	Second Division	12	2	2	0	0	0	2	0	16	2
Stoke City	1988–89	Second Division	16	4	0	0	2	1	0	0	18	5
Stoke City	Total		28	6	2	0	2	1	2	0	34	7
Career total			387	107	23	8	36	19	17	7	463	141

== Honours ==
Queens Park Rangers

- Football League Second Division: 1982–83
- FA Cup runner-up: 1981–82

Aston Villa

- Football League Second Division runner-up: 1987–88

Falkirk

- Scottish Football League First Division: 1990–91
