= Gary Waddock =

Football manager (born 1962)

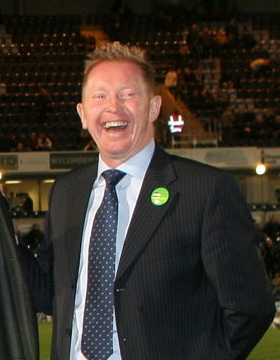
- Waddock in 2011

Personal information
- Full name: Gary Patrick Waddock
- Date of birth: 17 March 1962 (age 64)
- Place of birth: Kingsbury, Middlesex, England
- Height: 5 ft 9 in (1.75 m)
- Position: Midfielder

Team information
- Current team: Wealdstone (manager)

Senior career*
Years	Team	Apps	(Gls)
1979–1987	Queens Park Rangers	203	(8)
1987–1989	Charleroi	40	(1)
1989–1991	Millwall	58	(2)
1991–1992	Queens Park Rangers	0	(0)
1992	→ Swindon Town (loan)	6	(0)
1992–1994	Bristol Rovers	71	(1)
1994–1998	Luton Town	153	(3)
Total		531	(15)

International career
1979	Republic of Ireland U21	1	(0)
1990	Republic of Ireland B	1	(0)
1990	Republic of Ireland U23	1	(0)
1980–1990	Republic of Ireland	21	(3)

Managerial career
- 2006: Queens Park Rangers
- 2007–2009: Aldershot Town
- 2009–2012: Wycombe Wanderers
- 2014: Oxford United
- 2015: Portsmouth (caretaker)
- 2016–2019: Aldershot Town
- 2019: Southend United (caretaker)
- 2026–: Wealdstone
- * Club domestic league appearances and goals

Gary Patrick Waddock (born 17 March 1962) is a football manager and former player who is the manager of National League club Wealdstone.

A midfielder, he spent most of his career playing for Queens Park Rangers and Luton Town. He also had stints at Belgian club Charleroi and at Millwall, Swindon Town and Bristol Rovers. Born in England, he represented the Republic of Ireland internationally at youth and senior levels, making 21 appearances and scoring 3 goals for the senior team.

Having retired from playing in 1998, Waddock went into management, taking over former club Queens Park Rangers in 2006. He went on to manage Aldershot Town, Wycombe Wanderers and Oxford United. He has worked at Milton Keynes Dons as head of coaching and Portsmouth as assistant and caretaker manager.

== Playing career ==
During his playing career, he appeared professionally (predominantly as a midfielder) for six different clubs. He earned 21 international caps for the Republic of Ireland, scoring three goals in the process. Waddock was named by Jack Charlton in the squad for the 1990 FIFA World Cup, but having travelled to the pre-tournament camp in Malta, he was dropped at the last minute in favour of Alan McLoughlin, seen as better cover for players nursing injuries. Years later Charlton later said that he should have kept Waddock and dropped veteran striker Frank Stapleton instead.

He debuted for Queens Park Rangers in 1979 and went on to play 203 times and scored eight goals in the following eight years, playing in the 1982 FA Cup final.

He left QPR for Charleroi in Belgium for three years between 1987 and 1989, making 40 appearances and scoring one goal, before returning to London with Millwall. In two years with Millwall, Waddock appeared 58 times and scored twice for the 'Lions'.

By 1991 he was back at QPR although he failed to make the first team and found himself on loan at Swindon Town where he made six appearances. Following on from his spell at Swindon, Waddock moved to Bristol Rovers in 1992, scoring one goal in 71 matches over the next three years.

His swan song took place with Luton Town. In four years he made 153 appearances and scored his final three professional goals.

== Managerial career ==
=== Queens Park Rangers ===
During his time as manager, Ian Holloway took Waddock onto the coaching staff at Loftus Road at the QPR academy. Waddock found himself the new caretaker manager at QPR following Holloway's suspension on 6 February 2006. Waddock, along with Alan McDonald as his assistant, managed to keep the club in the Championship, finishing 21st.

He was appointed full-time manager on 28 June 2006 after Holloway was put on gardening leave and eventually left for Plymouth Argyle. On 20 September 2006, after a poor set of results had left QPR bottom of the table, Waddock was replaced by John Gregory. He did, however, stay at the club as assistant manager.

=== Aldershot Town ===
He was confirmed as the new manager of Conference side Aldershot Town on 19 May 2007. Waddock won his first trophy on 3 April 2008, when Aldershot Town beat Rushden & Diamonds 4–3 on penalties in the Conference League Cup. The Shots finished top of the Conference National with a record 101 points, and were promoted to the Football League after a 1–1 draw away at Exeter City gave them the point they needed. The Shots ended the season on an 18-match undefeated run. In recognition of this achievement, Waddock was named Conference manager of the year.

=== Wycombe Wanderers ===
Waddock was appointed manager of the League One side on 13 October 2009 as successor to the sacked Peter Taylor. Despite a turn in form, and a large turnover of players towards the end of the season, Waddock was unable to prevent Wycombe Wanderers' relegation to League Two.

Waddock again added to his squad in the summer by signing Nikki Bull, Andy Sandell and Dave Winfield, who he had previously managed, whilst at Aldershot Town. At the start of 2011, he captured Scott Donnelly on a season long loan, who he previously managed at both Queens Park Rangers and Aldershot Town.

Wycombe finished the 2010–11 season by being promoted back to League One (finishing third in League Two) after beating Southend United 3–1 at Adams Park in their final game of the season. However, they were relegated back to League Two the following season. On 22 September, Waddock was sacked as manager after a 1–0 defeat to AFC Wimbledon, their third successive defeat, left them 21st in League Two.

=== Milton Keynes Dons ===
In June 2013, Waddock was appointed as head of coaching at Milton Keynes Dons under Karl Robinson.

=== Oxford United ===
On 22 March 2014, Waddock was appointed as Head Coach of Oxford United, replacing caretaker manager Mickey Lewis. The club failed to reach the League Two play-offs under his managership, losing 7 of the 8 games played during his tenure, and his contract was terminated in July the same year after changes in the club's ownership.

=== Barnet ===
Waddock joined Barnet in a coaching role for the 2014–15 season on a casual basis. In November, he agreed a rolling month-to-month contract, but left for Portsmouth on 12 December.

=== Portsmouth ===
On 12 December 2014, Waddock was announced as the new assistant manager of Portsmouth. On 13 April 2015, Waddock was named as temporary manager for the last four games of the 2014–15 season after Andy Awford left the position by mutual consent.

=== Return to Aldershot Town ===
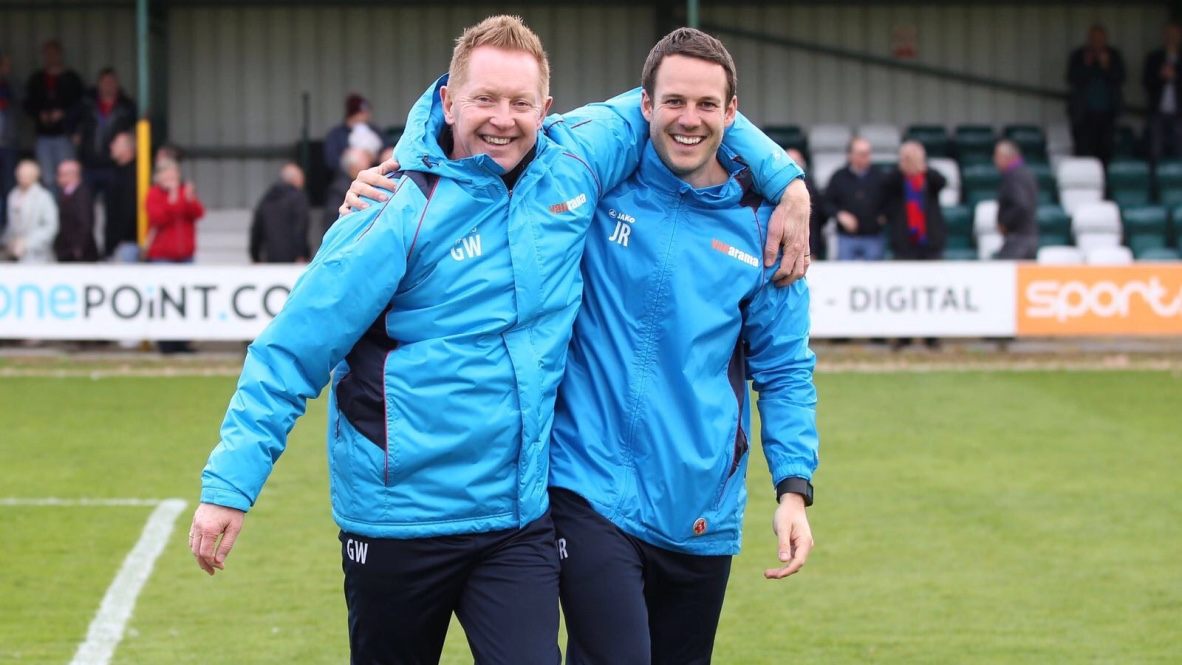
Waddock (left) in 2018 with Aldershot Town

On 5 May 2016, Waddock was reappointed as first-team manager at his former club Aldershot Town of the National League. On 2 May 2019, Waddock left the club after his contract was mutually terminated following their relegation from the National League.

=== Southend United ===
On 5 July 2019, he joined Southend United as assistant manager to Kevin Bond. After Bond's resignation he took caretaker charge of the team until the appointment of Sol Campbell.

=== Cambridge United ===
On 10 July 2020, Waddock was appointed assistant head coach of Cambridge United. He was part of the coaching staff that helped Cambridge United secure promotion to League One during the 2020–21 campaign. He was released as assistant head coach at the end of the 2022–23 season after the club narrowly avoided relegation.

=== Walsall ===
On 28 June 2023, he was appointed assistant head coach at League Two club Walsall, joining Mat Sadler's backroom staff.

=== Wealdstone ===
On 27 February 2026, Waddock left his role as assistant head coach at Walsall to become manager of National League club Wealdstone on a deal running until the summer of 2028, his first permanent managerial role in just under seven years. He replaced Sam Cox.

== Managerial statistics ==
As of match played 21 November 2026

Managerial record by team and tenure
Team	From	To	Record					Ref.
Team	From	To	P	W	D	L	Win %	Ref.
Queens Park Rangers	6 February 2006	19 September 2006	24	4	8	12	16.7	
Aldershot Town	18 May 2007	14 October 2009	125	60	30	35	48.0	
Wycombe Wanderers	13 October 2009	23 September 2012	147	47	39	61	32.0	
Oxford United	22 March 2014	4 July 2014	8	1	0	7	12.5	
Portsmouth (caretaker)	13 April 2015	2 May 2015	4	1	1	2	25.0	
Aldershot Town	5 May 2016	2 May 2019	152	56	45	51	36.8	
Southend United (caretaker)	13 September 2019	22 October 2019	9	1	2	6	11.1	
Wealdstone	27 February 2026	Present	41	15	9	17	36.6	
Total			510	185	134	191	36.3	

== Honours ==
=== As a player ===
Queens Park Rangers

- FA Cup runner-up: 1981–82

=== As a manager ===
Aldershot Town

- Conference Premier: 2007–08
- Conference League Cup: 2007–08

Wycombe Wanderers

- Football League Two third-place promotion: 2010–11

Wealdstone

- FA Trophy runner-up: 2025–26

== See also ==
- List of Republic of Ireland international footballers born outside the Republic of Ireland
