= Steve Wicks =

English football player and manager (born 1956)

Personal information
- Date of birth: October 31, 1956 (age 69)
- Place of birth: Reading, England
- Height: 6 ft 2 in (1.88 m)
- Position: Centre-half

Youth career
- 1973–1974: Chelsea

Senior career*
Years	Team	Apps	(Gls)
1974–1978	Chelsea	118	(5)
1978–1979	Derby County	24	(0)
1979–1981	Queens Park Rangers	73	(0)
1981–1982	Crystal Palace	14	(1)
1981–1986	Queens Park Rangers	116	(6)
1986–1988	Chelsea	32	(1)

International career
1975	England Youth	7	(0)
1976	England U21	1	(0)

Managerial career
- 1992: Crawley Town
- 1993–1994: Scarborough
- 1995: Lincoln City
- 1996: Woodlands Wellington
- 1997–1998: Selangor FA
- * Club domestic league appearances and goals

Steve Wicks (born 31 October 1956) is an English former professional footballer who played as a centre-half, most notably played for Chelsea, Derby County and Queens Park Rangers in the 1970s and 1980s. Wicks made his debut for Chelsea aged 19 in 1975. After initially leaving QPR for Crystal Palace in 1981 he returned to QPR in March 1982, but was cup-tied for their appearance in the 1982 FA Cup Final.

Over his two spells at QPR he was part of the successful side that won the Second Division Championship in 1983 and appeared in the League Cup Final in 1986.

He later moved into management with Crawley Town, and in the Football League at that time with Scarborough, and then Lincoln City where he held the post for only 42 days. He then moved abroad and managed in Singapore with Woodlands Wellington and subsequently Malaysian side Selangor FA from 1997 to 1998. He is currently working at Queens Park Rangers football club as part of the corporate hospitality team. He is the father of Matt Wicks who was on the books at Manchester United and Arsenal and played for Brighton and Hove Albion. After retiring from football Wicks got offered a managing job in Malaysia and Singapore, which he took, and all his family moved with him. He enjoyed the time away but returned to England five years later.

== Honours ==
Queens Park Rangers

- Football League Cup runner-up: 1985–86
