= Warren Neill =

English footballer

Personal information
- Full name: Warren Anthony Neill
- Date of birth: 21 November 1962 (age 63)
- Place of birth: Acton, England
- Height: 5 ft 8 in (1.73 m)
- Position: Defender

Senior career*
Years	Team	Apps	(Gls)
1980–1988	Queens Park Rangers	181	(3)
1988–1996	Portsmouth	218	(3)
1996	Watford	1	(0)
Total		400	(6)

International career
1978	England Schoolboys	5	(0)
- * Club domestic league appearances and goals

Warren Anthony Neill (born 21 November 1962) is an English former footballer who played in the Football League for Queens Park Rangers and Portsmouth. After his playing career, he rejoined Queens Park Rangers as a coach.

Neill made his QPR debut against Chelsea in 1980 and went on to play 181 league games scoring 3 goals. He played in the FA Cup Final replay in 1982 (replacing the suspended Glenn Roeder), was part of the Second Division Championship team in 1983 and a member of the 1986 Football League Cup Final team.

He transferred to Portsmouth in 1988. He helped Portsmouth reach the 1992 FA Cup semi final, and provided the through pass for Pompey's goal in the first game, but was one of three Pompey players to miss his kick as they lost the replay on a penalty shoot-out to Liverpool.

He was invited onto the QPR coaching staff by manager John Gregory towards the end of the 2006–07 season on a temporary basis, making the deal permanent in June 2007. On 16 January 2008 Neill joined Luton Town as assistant to Mick Harford. On 27 November 2008, Neill was released from his position of assistant, being replaced by former Luton player Kevin Watson.

== Honours ==
Queens Park Rangers

- FA Cup runner-up: 1981–82
- Football League Cup runner-up: 1985–86
