= Peter Hucker =

English footballer (born 1959)

Personal information
- Date of birth: 28 October 1959 (age 67)
- Place of birth: Hampstead, London, England
- Height: 6 ft 2 in (1.88 m)
- Position: Goalkeeper

Youth career
- 1974–1980: Queens Park Rangers

Senior career*
| Years | Team | Apps | (Gls) |
| 1980–1986 | Queens Park Rangers | 160 | (0) |
| 1986–1989 | Oxford United | 66 | (0) |
| 1987–1988 | → West Bromwich Albion (loan) | 7 | (0) |
| 1988 | → Manchester United (loan) | 0 | (0) |
| 1989 | → Manchester United (loan) | 0 | (0) |
| 1989–1990 | Millwall | 0 | (0) |
| 1990–1991 | Aldershot | 27 | (0) |
| 1991–1992 | Farnborough Town | ? | (0) |
| 1992–1993 | Enfield | ? | (0) |
| Total | | 251 | (0) |

International career
| 1984 | England U21 | 2 | (0) |
- * Club domestic league appearances and goals

Peter Hucker (born 28 October 1959) is an English former footballer who played as a goalkeeper in The Football League during the 1980s and early 1990s.

Born in Hampstead, he joined Queens Park Rangers as a schoolboy in December 1974, signed apprentice forms in July 1976 and turned professional in July 1977, making his league debut against Shrewsbury Town in 1981. Hucker had been at the club since he was a junior but had played very few games. He had seen a succession of managers bring their own preferred goalkeepers in while he bided his time in the reserves.

He got his big chance in a FA Cup Third Round tie at Loftus Road in 1982 against Middlesbrough. The first-choice keeper at the time, John Burridge, was injured but was also not very keen on playing on the synthetic playing surface that Loftus Road had at the time. Hucker played very well in the cup tie and retained his place for the remainder of the season, including in the 1982 FA Cup final against Tottenham Hotspur in which he was voted the 'Man of the Match' for his performance in the first game, in which he played extremely well despite being injured.

Hucker was to play a key role the following season as well as QPR stormed to the Second Division title and then the following year as Rangers finished top London club in the 1983–84 season, qualifying for the UEFA Cup. Like many of the talented players of that team his form suffered as Terry Venables left the club in 1984 to be replaced by Alan Mullery. He lost his place during the 1985–86 season (to Paul Barron and he transferred to Oxford United in February 1987. Hucker played 160 league games for QPR.

In a three-year spell at Oxford, Hucker played 66 league matches, but towards the end of his time there, he went on several loan spells, first to West Bromwich Albion in 1987–88, making seven appearances, and then twice to Manchester United without making a single appearance.

He finished his career in non-league football and went on to establish a successful goalkeeping coaching school after retiring from the game.

== Honours ==
Queens Park Rangers

- FA Cup runner-up: 1981–82
