= Wayne Fereday =

English footballer

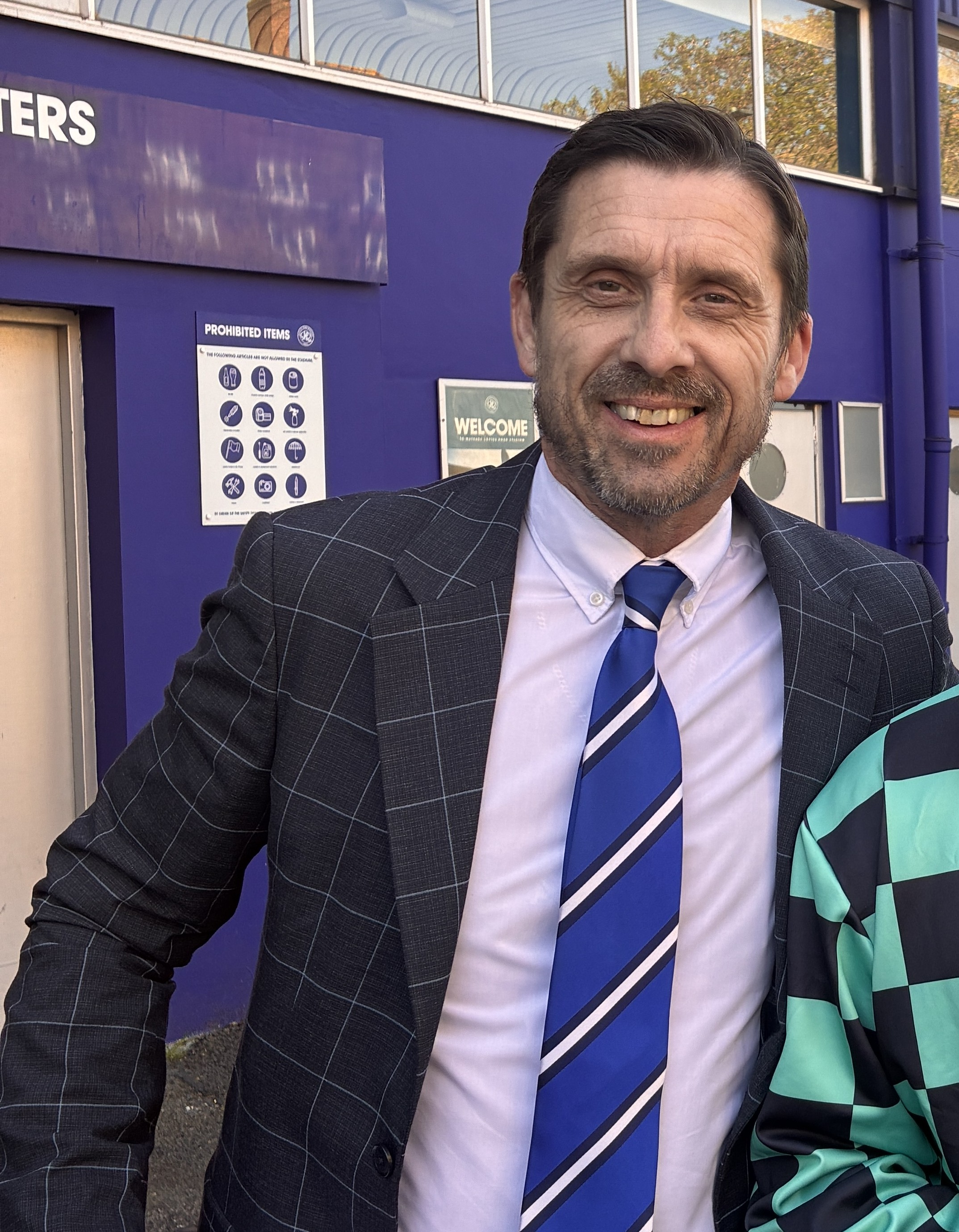

Personal information
- Date of birth: 16 June 1963 (age 63)
- Place of birth: Warley, England
- Height: 5 ft 9 in (1.75 m)
- Position: Winger

Youth career
- 1978 – 1980: Queens Park Rangers

Senior career*
Years	Team	Apps	(Gls)
1980–1989	Queens Park Rangers	246	(21)
1989–1990	Newcastle United	33	(0)
1990–1991	AFC Bournemouth	23	(0)
1991–1994	West Bromwich Albion	48	(3)
1994–1995	Cardiff City	44	(2)

International career
1984–1986	England U21	5	(0)
- * Club domestic league appearances and goals

Wayne Fereday (born 16 June 1963) is an English former professional footballer who played in the Football League as a winger for Queens Park Rangers, Newcastle United, AFC Bournemouth, West Bromwich Albion and Cardiff City. He was capped by England at under-21 level.

== Career ==
Fereday was born in Warley, now in the West Midlands county, and began his football career with Queens Park Rangers. He scored twice on his debut as a 17-year-old, on 19 August 1980 in a 4–0 home win over Bristol Rovers in the Second Division. Noted for his pace, he went on to play more than 200 games for QPR, and was capped five times for England under-21. He moved on to Newcastle United in 1989, followed by AFC Bournemouth, but had a difficult time at both. He finished his league career with West Bromwich Albion and Cardiff City, where his career was cut short by injury.
