= Ian Dawes (footballer, born 1963) =

English footballer

Personal information
- Full name: Ian Robert Dawes
- Date of birth: 22 February 1963 (age 63)
- Place of birth: Croydon, England
- Height: 5 ft 7 in (1.70 m)
- Position: Defender

Youth career
- Queens Park Rangers

Senior career*
Years	Team	Apps	(Gls)
1981–1988	Queens Park Rangers	229	(3)
1988–1995	Millwall	225	(5)
1995–?	Bromley		

International career
1978	England Schoolboys	8	(0)

Managerial career
- Carshalton Athletic
- Dorking
- 2002–2004: Redhill
- 2005–2006: Redhill
- * Club domestic league appearances and goals

Ian Robert Dawes (born 22 February 1963) is an English former professional footballer.

Born in Croydon, Surrey, Dawes made more than 200 appearances in the Football League for each of his two clubs, Queens Park Rangers and Millwall, playing as a left back.

Dawes made his debut for Queens Park Rangers on 27 March 1982 against Rotherham United, and went on to play in 229 league games, including 198 consecutive appearances between 1982 and 1986, and scored three goals. Dawes was a member of the 1986 Football League Cup Final team.

Dawes left QPR for Millwall in 1988, and played 258 times for Millwall and was their Player of the Year in 1989–90, before moving to non-League Bromley.

He later coached at Charlton Athletic and Millwall before managing non-league clubs Carshalton Athletic and Dorking, and two spells as manager of Redhill, from 2002 to 2004 and from October 2005 to October 2006.

== Honours ==
Queens Park Rangers

- Football League Cup runner-up: 1985–86
