= Terry Fenwick =

English football player and coach

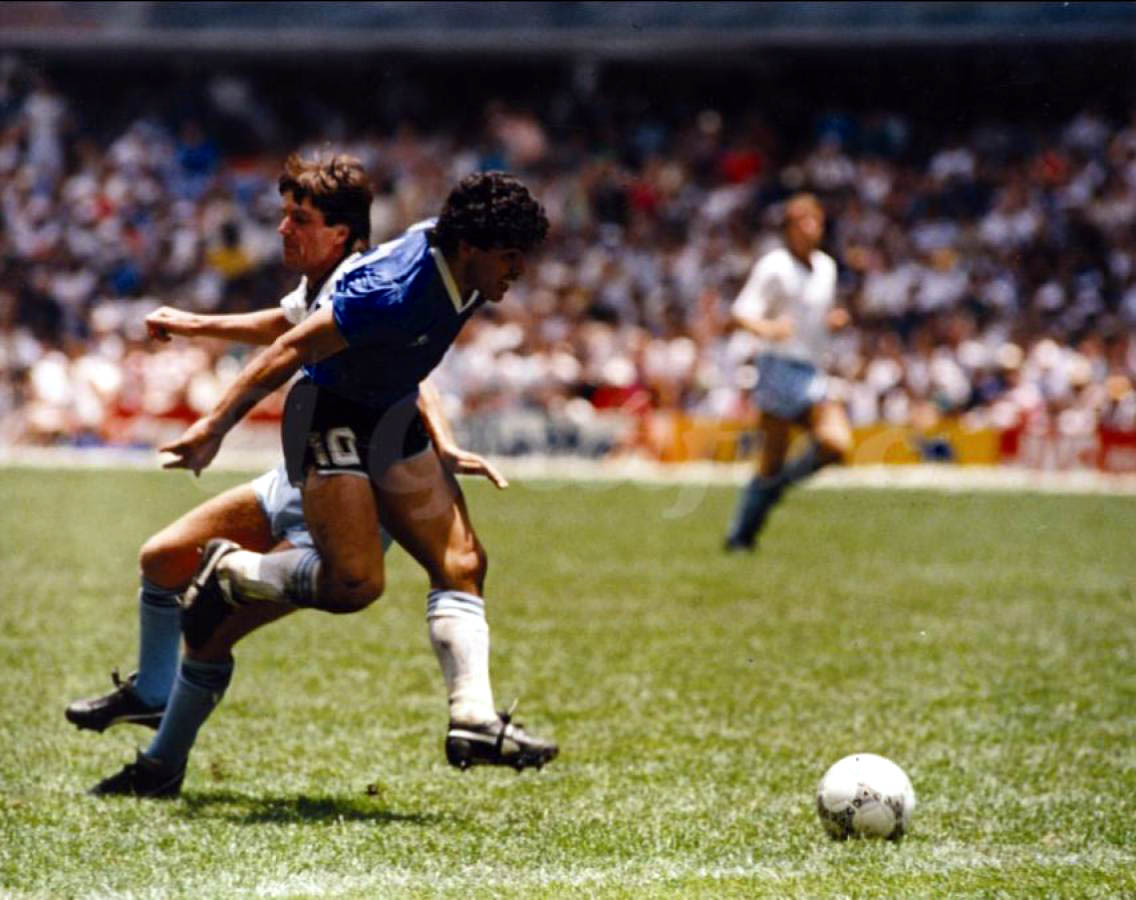
- Fenwick playing for England at the 1986 FIFA World Cup in the build up to the "Goal of the Century"

Personal information
- Full name: Terence William Fenwick
- Date of birth: 17 November 1959 (age 66)
- Place of birth: Seaham, England
- Height: 5 ft 11 in (1.80 m)
- Positions: Centre-back; full-back

Youth career
- –1976: Crystal Palace

Senior career*
Years	Team	Apps	(Gls)
1976–1980	Crystal Palace	70	(0)
1980–1987	Queens Park Rangers	256	(33)
1987–1993	Tottenham Hotspur	93	(9)
1990–1991	→ Leicester City (loan)	8	(1)
1993–1995	Swindon Town	28	(0)
Total		455	(42)

International career
1977–1978	England Youth	7	(1)
1980–1982	England U21	11	(0)
1984–1988	England	20	(0)

Managerial career
- 1995–1998: Portsmouth
- 2001–2003: San Juan Jabloteh
- 2003: Northampton Town
- 2004–2005: Ashford Town
- 2005–2009: San Juan Jabloteh
- 2009–2011: San Juan Jabloteh
- 2013–2014: Central
- 2014: Visé
- 2019–2021: Trinidad and Tobago
- * Club domestic league appearances and goals

Terence William Fenwick (born 17 November 1959) is an English former football manager and player who played either as a centre-back or a full-back.

During his playing career, he made a total of 455 appearances in the English Football League for Crystal Palace, Queens Park Rangers, Tottenham Hotspur, Leicester City and Swindon Town. Fenwick made twenty appearances for the England national football team from 1984 to 1988, and represented the country at the 1986 FIFA World Cup.

Fenwick began his managerial career in the mid-1990s with Portsmouth F.C. From 1995 to 1998. He later had executive and managerial stints at Southall, Ashford Town and Northampton Town. Since the early 2000s, Fenwick is primarily managing Trinidad and Tobago, where he has been in charge of San Juan Jabloteh (on three occasions), Central and the Trinidad and Tobago national team. [Football Factory Trinidad]

== Club career ==
=== Crystal Palace ===
Fenwick began his youth career at Crystal Palace, where he was part of the team that won the FA Youth Cup in both 1977 and 1978, scoring the only goal in each final in two 1–0 wins over Everton and Aston Villa respectively. He signed professional terms with Palace in December 1976, made his league debut away to Tottenham Hotspur in December 1977, and went on to make 10 appearances that season. In the 1978–79 season, Palace was promoted to the top flight and Fenwick made a further 20 appearances, and 10 in the 1979–80 season. During those three seasons, Fenwick wore eight different numbered shirts for Palace at a time when shirt numbers equated more to playing position. Fenwick started the next season as first choice left-back after the departure of Kenny Sansom. After a poor start to the season, the club looked set for relegation and in December 1980, Fenwick rejoined former Palace manager Terry Venables at Queens Park Rangers. He had made 70 league appearances for Palace, but without scoring.

=== Queens Park Rangers ===
Fenwick signed for Queens Park Rangers in December 1980, for £110,000 and went on to make 256 appearances scoring 33 goals. Whilst at Queens Park Rangers, he became the first full-back to score a goal from open play in an FA Cup Final when he equalized against Tottenham Hotspur in the 1982 final.

=== Tottenham Hotspur ===
In December 1987 Fenwick was again signed by Terry Venables for Tottenham Hotspur, for a fee of £550,000 and went on to make 93 appearances for Spurs, scoring nine times mostly from the penalty spot in just one season, 1988–89. In 1990–91, Fenwick had a loan spell at Leicester City (eight appearances, one goal), after which he returned to Spurs halfway through the season. A broken ankle ruled him out of their victory in the 1991 FA Cup Final.

=== Swindon Town ===
In 1993, Fenwick signed for Swindon Town, at that time a newly promoted Premier League team. His first season, saw Swindon winning only 5 games of a total 42, conceding 100 goals and being relegated. Fenwick played 28 games during this season, and was noted for involvement in an incident which resulted in a broken leg for Paul Warhurst. He played only two games the following season, was released in December 1994, and ended his playing career shortly thereafter.

== International career ==
Fenwick made his international debut for the full England side in May 1984 as a substitute for Alvin Martin at Wrexham, and went on to make 20 appearances for the national side up until 1988.

He holds the English record for most yellow cards, three, in a single World Cup tournament, which he achieved in the 1986 FIFA World Cup. During that World Cup, Fenwick was also noted for being dribbled past by Diego Maradona as Maradona scored the "Goal of the Century".

== Managerial career ==
After retiring as a player Fenwick moved into football management. In 1995, he replaced Jim Smith as manager for Portsmouth. After a poor first full season in charge, during which the club only avoided relegation on goal difference, an improved second season saw the club miss out on a play-off spot by one place, while they also eliminated then-Premier League Leeds United from the FA Cup. Fenwick left Portsmouth in January 1998 with the club bottom of the Division One table. Fenwick then followed Terry Venables to Crystal Palace, where he served as assistant manager.

In a turn of events, Fenwick was canvassed by a businessman and coerced to become the new public face of beleaguered non-league outfit Southall between 2000 and 2001. It led to fellow Queens Park Rangers teammate Mike Fillery being installed to take charge of first team affairs, before both were ousted amid the debacle surrounding the club's ownership.

After managing San Juan Jabloteh, where he won the TT Pro League in back-to-back seasons, Fenwick returned to England to take charge of Northampton Town. However, he only lasted for seven games. His first game saw a 1–0 lead turn into a 2–1 defeat away to Blackpool. The next five games saw just two draws and three more defeats. His last game in charge was against Bristol City. The 2–1 defeat saw calls for his departure from fans and he left the post the following Monday. He was replaced by Martin Wilkinson. That summer, Fenwick was lined up to become the new manager of Luton Town, but he decided not to take the job due to uncertainty over the club's ownership – amid allegations of fraud surrounding the Hatters, and former Southall chairman John Gurney. In September 2004, Fenwick became director of football at Isthmian League side Ashford Town. The following month, Fenwick was appointed manager by owner Tim Thorogood. He resigned in January 2005, after a poor run of form, as well as failing to have a consistent line-up due to a turnover of players.

Since his managerial days in England, Fenwick has spent a considerable amount of time in Trinidad and Tobago, where he has enjoyed a great degree of managerial success – winning the country's professional football league on four occasions (2002, 2003, 2007 and 2008). After securing a place in the Caribbean Champions League for Central, Fenwick signed for Visé in the Belgian Second Division. However, in October 2014, the club was declared bankrupt.

On 19 December 2019, Fenwick was appointed as the head coach of the Trinidad and Tobago national team on a two-year contract commencing on 1 January 2020. Due to the COVID-19 pandemic, he did not take charge of his first match until 31 January 2021, in a 7–0 loss to the United States, equalling the biggest defeat in Trinidad and Tobago's history. Despite being favoured to qualify out of their first round group, Trinidad and Tobago had eight points from four matches, finishing one point behind Saint Kitts and Nevis. On 11 June, Fenwick had his contract "terminated" by the Trinidad and Tobago Football Association.

== Personal life ==
Fenwick received a four-month prison sentence in September 1991 after being convicted of drink-driving. He served two months of his sentence.

Fenwick was close friends with the actor Tony Selby. He has said he was his most famous friend outside of football.

== Honours ==
Queens Park Rangers

- FA Cup runner-up: 1981–82
- Football League Cup runner-up: 1985–86
