= Alan McDonald (Northern Ireland footballer) =

Northern Irish footballer (1963–2012)

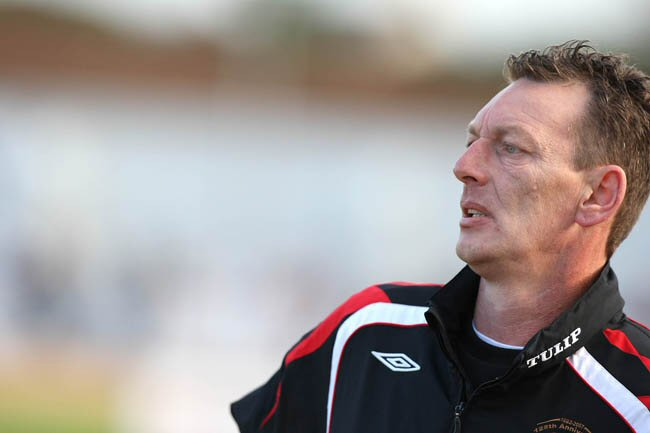
- McDonald while manager of Glentoran

Personal information
- Date of birth: 12 October 1963
- Place of birth: Belfast, Northern Ireland
- Date of death: 23 June 2012 (aged 48)
- Place of death: Lisburn, Northern Ireland
- Height: 1.88 m (6 ft 2 in)
- Position: Centre back

Youth career
- 1979–1981: Queens Park Rangers

Senior career*
Years	Team	Apps	(Gls)
1982–1997	Queens Park Rangers	402	(13)
1983	→ Charlton Athletic (loan)	9	(0)
1997–1998	Swindon Town	33	(1)
Total		444	(14)

International career
1985–1996	Northern Ireland	52	(3)

Managerial career
- 2007–2010: Glentoran
- * Club domestic league appearances and goals

Alan McDonald (12 October 1963 – 23 June 2012) was a Northern Irish football manager and former professional footballer.

As a player, he was a centre back who spent most of his career in England with Queens Park Rangers, notably playing in numerous Premier League seasons. He would play 402 times in the league for the club over a sixteen-year spell at Loftus Road. He also had brief stints in the Football League with both Charlton Athletic and Swindon Town. He was capped 52 times for Northern Ireland and played at the 1986 FIFA World Cup in Mexico.

After retiring as a player, he briefly returned to QPR as a first team coach before going on to manage IFA Premiership side Glentoran from June 2007 until his resignation at the end of February 2010. McDonald collapsed and died whilst playing golf at the Temple Golf Club near Lisburn on 23 June 2012.

== Club career ==
McDonald joined Queens Park Rangers on 4 October 1979 as a youth player and spent 17 years with the club. Unable to break into the first-team early on in his career, he gained his first league experience whilst on loan at Charlton Athletic and made his league début versus v Crystal Palace on 4 April 1983. His QPR début was at Wolves on 24 September 1983 in a 4–0 away win. McDonald and QPR reached the final of the League Cup in 1986. By the late 1980s, McDonald was playing as stopper in QPR's sweeper system. During his time the club's best finish came in 1993 when they finished in fifth place and were the highest placed London club in the first season of the newly formed Premiership. Their worst came in 1996 when they were relegated.

McDonald's last game for QPR was on 31 March 1997 in a home match v Wolves. He joined Swindon Town on a free transfer in the summer of 1997, making 36 appearances and scoring once in his last season as a player, 1997–98.

== International career ==
McDonald played 52 times for Northern Ireland, including the 1986 World Cup in Mexico, and worked as an assistant manager at Swindon Town and Northern Ireland national team. He played a significant role in the 0-0 draw against England at Wembley in November 1985 which saw Northern Ireland qualify for the 1986 World Cup, giving a post-match interview rebutting suggestions that the match had been 'fixed' which was remembered for many years after.

== Coaching career ==
McDonald returned to QPR briefly in February 2006 as assistant to manager Gary Waddock but Waddock struggled as manager and McDonald left in September 2006. McDonald was appointed as coach of Glentoran to help manager Paul Millar. McDonald almost left the club when he heard that Roy Walker was appointed new manager, but due to not having UEFA badges, McDonald stepped in and was appointed manager.

== Managerial career ==
In June 2007 he became manager of Glentoran in his native Belfast, where he stayed for three seasons, guiding the club to the IFA Premiership title in 2008–09. He also coached his country's under-21 side. After McDonald was appointed manager of Glentoran, he started to bring in new faces. He signed Dungannon Swifts winger David Scullion along with Rory Hamill. McDonald also brought in young promising players, including Daryl Fordyce, Philip Carson, Matty Burrows, and Shane McCabe. He also added goalkeeper Michael Dougherty as backup to Elliott Morris, and brought in Hearts defender Johnny Taylor. In his first full season as manager of the East Belfast club, McDonald led Glentoran to win the County Antrim Shield over Crusaders. In McDonald's second season, he led the club to become Irish Premiership champions after four years. During his second season McDonald continued to bring in new faces, after selling Michael Dougherty, McDonald brought in Dundela keeper James Taylor. In his third season in charge McDonald started by signing former Northern Ireland international Keith Gillespie and Newry City player Richard Clarke. But Glentoran went on a losing streak, and after a 6–0 home defeat to Coleraine, fans turned against McDonald and calling for him to resign. McDonald stayed on until his side lost 2–0 to Dungannon Swifts F.C. and McDonald resigned after the game.

McDonald did not manage since resigning from Glentoran, although he was linked with the Ballymena United manager's job following the resignation of Roy Walker. McDonald also owned a trophy shop in Bangor.

== Death ==
On the morning of 23 June 2012, McDonald collapsed and died while playing golf at Temple Golf and Country Club near Lisburn in County Antrim. The IFA posted a short statement on its official website – "The Irish FA is saddened by this morning's news of the sudden death of Alan McDonald. Our thoughts are with his family at this time. We are deeply shocked at the death of Alan, who won over 50 caps for Northern Ireland. To die at such a young age is terrible." Former Northern Ireland manager Sammy McIlroy described himself as "shellshocked" and said Norman Whiteside was "devastated." QPR posted a message on www.qpr.co.uk which read: "Queens Park Rangers Football Club is desperately saddened to learn of the passing of former captain and assistant manager Alan McDonald." In honour of his memory the club's plane for the 2012–13 pre-season tour was named "The Alan McDonald". In addition to this the club held a minute's applause for McDonald before their opening 2012–13 match against Swansea City.

== Career statistics ==
Scores and results list Northern Ireland's goal tally first.

#	Date	Venue	Opponent	Score	Result	Competition
1.	26 March 1986	Windsor Park, Belfast	Denmark	1–0	1–1	Friendly
2.	11 September 1991	Landskrona IP, Landskrona	Faroe Islands	3–0	5–0	Euro 1992 qualifier
3.	17 February 1993	Qemal Stafa Stadium, Tirana	Albania	2–0	2–1	1994 World Cup qualifier

== Honours ==
=== As a player ===
Queens Park Rangers

- Football League Cup runner-up: 1985–86

=== As a manager ===
Glentoran

- County Antrim Shield: 2007–08
- IFA Premiership: 2008–09
