= 1980–81 Queens Park Rangers F.C. season =

English football club season

Queens Park Rangers
1980–81 season
- Chairman: Jim Gregory
- Manager: Tommy Docherty resigned Oct 7th,Terry Venables from Oct 14th
- Stadium: Loftus Road
- Second Division: 8th
- FA Cup: Third round
- Football League Cup: Third round
- Top goalscorer: League: Tommy Langley (8); All: Tommy Langley (9)
- Highest home attendance: 23,811 v West Ham United F.C. (26 December 1980)
- Lowest home attendance: 6,668 v Cambridge United 25 April 1981
- Average home league attendance: 10,938
- Biggest win: 5-0 Vs Cambridge United (25 April 1981)
- Biggest defeat: 0-4 Vs Leyton Orient (31 March 1981)
Home colours	Away colours	Third colours

During the 1980–81 English football season, Queens Park Rangers competed in the Second Division

== Season summary ==
Having led the Rangers to a fifth-place finish in the Second Division in his first season in charge, manager Tommy Docherty fell out with chairman and Gregory resulted in him leaving the club by mutual consent at the end of that season but, following a player revolt, he was reinstated as boss nine days later, ahead of the start of the 1980/81 season. His 'third' spell in charge would only last 10 league games, however. After failing in an attempt to sign Andy Ritchie from his former club Manchester United, "Doc" announced that Ritchie should not sign for Chelsea because he was too good for the Second Division, despite the R's competing in the same league themselves.

Rangers chairman Gregory made Docherty apologise to the Chelsea chairman and following a goalless draw with Leyton Orient – and with Rangers towards the bottom of the second tier – he was dismissed and left the club for a third and final time. his replacement Terry Venables previous club Crystal Palace were bottom of Division One when he left during October to join Second Division Queens Park Rangers.With 11 away defeats Rangers fell to eighth position seven points short of the third promotion spot.

In the League Cup, Rangers beat Derby County on penalties but were knocked out in the next round by division foes Notts County, In the F.A. Cup eventual winners Tottenham Hotspur triumphed after a replay

== Kit ==
Adidas remained as QPR's kit manufacturers.

== Second Division ==
Pos	Team	Pld	W	D	L	GF	GA	GD	Pts
6	Derby County	42	15	15	12	57	52	+5	45
7	Grimsby Town	42	15	15	12	44	42	+2	45
8	Queens Park Rangers	42	15	13	14	56	46	+10	43
9	Watford	42	16	11	15	50	45	+5	43
10	Sheffield Wednesday	42	17	8	17	53	51	+2	42

Rules for classification: 1) Points; 2) Goal difference; 3) Goals scored

== Results ==
QPR scores given first

Win Draw Loss

=== Second Division ===
Date	Opponents	Venue	Result F–A	Scorers	Attendance	Position
16 August 1980	Oldham	A	0-1		6,986	20
19 August 1980	Bristol Rovers	H	4-0	Fereday 2, Shanks Hazell	9,031	4
23 August 1980	Swansea City	H	0–0		10,854	10
30 August 1980	Chelsea	A	1–1	Langley 17'	23,381	8
6 September 1980	Notts County	A	1–2	Hill	7,197	15
13 September 1980	Newcastle United	H	1–2	Hazell	10,865	19
20 September 1980	Sheffield Wednesday	A	0-1		15,195	20
27 September 1980	Bristol City	H	4-0	Neal 2, Shanks, Langley	8,551	17
4 October 1980	Blackburn Rovers	A	1-2	Neal	12,209	19
7 October 1980	Orient	H	0–0		9,627	18
11 October 1980	Bolton Wanderers	H	3-1	Langley, Neal, Burke	8,641	12
18 October 1980	Derby County	A	3-3	King 2, Langley	16,021	13
22 October 1980	Cardiff City	A	0-1		14,489	17
25 October 1980	Wrexham	H	0-1		9,050	20
1 November 1980	Grimsby Town	A	0–0		10,015	19
8 November 1980	Luton Town	A	3-2	Neal 2, King	10,082	17
11 November 1980	Bristol Rovers	A	2-1	King, Langley	6,612	12
15 November 1980	Oldham Athletic	H	2-0	Silkman, Neal	8,223	12
22 November 1980	Preston North End	A	2-3	Roeder, Neal	6,762	13
29 November 1980	Shrewsbury Town	H	0-0		7,982	12
6 December 1980	Cambridge United	A	0–1		6,349	17
13 December 1980	Cardiff City	H				
19 December 1980	Bolton Wanderers	A	2-1	FlanaganStainrod	6,315	14
26 December 1980	West Ham United	H	3-0	Currie, Stainrod, Silkman	23,811	12
27 December 1980	Watford	A	1-1	King	23,547	12
10 January 1981	Preston North End	H	1-1	Stainrod	8,415	12
17 January 1981	Chelsea	H	1–0	Langley 52'	22,873	12
31 January 1981	Swansea City	A	2–1	Langley, King	12,518	11
3 February 1981	Cardiff City	H	2-0	Fenwick, Langley	9,834	8
7 February 1981	Newcastle United	A	0-1		20,404	9
14 February 1981	Notts County	H	1-1	Howe	11,457	11
21 February 1981	Bristol City	A	1–0	Waddock	11,036	8
28 February 1981	Sheffield Wednesday	H	1-2	Stainrod	15,104	10
7 March 1981	Blackburn Rovers	H	1-1	Francis	9,513	10
31 March 1981	Orient	A				
21 March 1981	Derby County	H	3-1	Francis 2, Flanagan	8,905	11
28 March 1981	Wrexham	A	1–1	Waddock	5,887	10
31 March 1981	Orient	A	0-4		6,724	11
4 April 1981	Grimsby Town	H	1–0	Francis	8,906	7
11 April 1981	Luton Town	A	0-3		12,112	10
11 April 1981	Watford	H	0-0		10,571	10
21 April 1981	West Ham	A	0-3		24,599	10
25 April 1981	Cambridge United	H	5–0	Sealy 2, Muir 2, Roeder	6,668	8
2 May 1981	Shrewsbury Town	A	3-3	FlanaganWaddock Fenwick	5,714	8

=== Football League Cup ===
Date	Round	Opponents	H / A	Result F–A	Scorers	Attendance
26 August 1980	Second Round First Leg	Derby County (Second Division)	H	0–0		11,244
3 September 1980	Second Round Second Leg	Derby County (Second Division)	A	0-0 *5-3 on Pens		16,728
23 September 1980	Third Round	Notts County (Second Division)	A	1-4	Langley	6644

=== FA Cup ===
Date	Round	Opponents	H / A	Result F–A	Scorers	Attendance
3 January 1981	Third Round	Tottenham Hotspur (First Division)	H	0–0		28,829
7 January 1981	Third Round Replay	Tottenham Hotspur (First Division)	A	1-3	Stainrod	36,294

=== Friendlies ===
Date	Opponents	H / A	Result F–A	Scorers	Attendance
14 July 1980	Sochaux Auxerre (FRA)	A			
16 July 1980	Racing Strasbourg (FRA)	A			
20 July 1980	Olympiakos Athens (GRC)	A			
29 July 1980	Uleaborg (FIN)	A			
31 July 1980	Helsinki (FIN)	A			
1 August 1980	Jaro (FIN)	A			
3 August 1980	IF Kamraterna (SWE)	A			
4 August 1980	Rauma Pallo (FIN)	A			
24 January 1981	Newport County	A			

== Squad ==
Pos.	Nat.	Name	League Appearances	League Goals	Cup Appearances	League Cup Goals	F A Cup Goals	Total Appearances	Total Goals
GK	ENG	Chris Woods	22		3			25	
GK	ENG	John Burridge	19		2			21	
GK	ENG	Peter Hucker	1					1	
DF	ENG	Terry Fenwick	19	2	2			21	2
DF	ENG	Ian Gillard	42		4			46	
DF	JAM	Bob Hazell	5	2	1			10	2
DF	ENG	Ernie Howe	8	1				8	1
DF	ENG	Warren Neill	3					5	
DF	ENG	Don Shanks	38	2	5			43	2
DF	ENG	Glenn Roeder	39	2	5			44	2
DF	ENG	Steve Wicks	38		5			43	
MF	ENG	Tony Currie	31	1	4			35	1
MF	ENG	Barry Silkman	22	2	2			25	2
MF	ENG	Gerry Francis	10	4				10	4
MF	NIR	David McCreery	14		3			19	
MF	ENG	Andy King	24	6	3			29	6
MF	ENG	Gary Micklewhite						1	
MF	IRE	Gary Waddock	29	3	4			37	3
MF	ENG	Dean Wilkins	1					2	
FW	ENG	Gordon Hill	3	1	1			6	1
FW	ENG	Steve Burke	11	1	2			15	1
FW	ENG	Tommy Langley	24	8	3	1		28	9
FW	ENG	Wayne Fereday	5		1			7	
FW	ENG	Mike Flanagan	13	3	2			16	3
FW	ENG	Ian Muir	2	2				2	2
FW	ENG	Tony Sealy	8	1				8	1
FW	ENG	Simon Stainrod	15	4	2		1	17	5
FW	NIR	Ian Stewart						1	
FW	ENG	Dean Neal	15	8	1			17	8

== Transfers Out ==
Name	from	Date	Fee	Date	Club	Fee
Mark Hill	Queens Park Rangers Juniors	July 1979		July 1980	Brentford	
Karl Elsey	Pembrokeshire	January 1979		August 1980	Newport	Free
Paul Goddard	Queens Park Rangers Juniors	July 1977		August 1980	West Ham	£800,000
Michael Walsh	Everton	March 29, 1979	£280,000	September 1980	Porto (Por)	£170,000
Gordon Hill	Derby	November 22, 1979	£150,000	January 1981	Montreal (Can)	£80,000
Tommy Langley	Chelsea	August 15, 1980	£425,000	March 1981	Crystal Palace	£200,000
Chris Woods	Nottingham Forest	June 28, 1979	£250,000	March 1981	Norwich City	£225,000
David McCreery	Manchester United	August 16, 1979	£200,000	March 1981	Tulsa Roughnecks	£125,000
Martyn Rogers	Manchester United	July 26, 1979	£7,500	May 1981	Sydney Olympic	Free
Dean Neal	Queens Park Rangers Juniors	July 1978		Mar 1981	Tulsa Roughnecks	£125,000
Andy Pape	Feltham	July 1980		May 1981	Ikast (Den)	Free
Steve Wicks	Derby County	September 20, 1979	£275,000	May 25, 1981	Crystal Palace	and £700,000 for Clive Allen
Martyn Busby	Queens Park Rangers Juniors	April 1970		June 1981	Retired (Injury)	

== Transfers In ==
Name	from	Date	Fee
Tommy Langley	Chelsea	August 15, 1980	£400,000
Wayne Fereday	Queens Park Rangers Juniors	August 28, 1980	
Warren Neill	Queens Park Rangers Juniors	September 3, 1980	
Ian Muir	Queens Park Rangers Juniors	September 3, 1980	
Andy King	Everton	September 12, 1980	£400,000
Barry Silkman	Brentford	October 30, 1980	£20,000
Simon Stainrod	Oldham Athletic	November 19, 1980	£270,000.
Terry Fenwick	Crystal Palace	December 15, 1980	£110,000
Mike Flanagan	Crystal Palace	December 15, 1980	£150,000
John Burridge	Crystal Palace	December 16, 1980	£250,000
Ian Dawes	Queens Park Rangers Juniors	December 24, 1980	
Gerry Francis	Crystal Palace	February 24, 1981	£150,000
Tony Sealy	Crystal Palace	March 12, 1981	£80,000
Clive Allen	Crystal Palace	May 25, 1981	Steve Wicks and £700,000
John Gregory	Brighton & Hove Albion	June 1981	£300,000
