= 1981–82 Queens Park Rangers F.C. season =

English football club season

Queens Park Rangers
1981–82 season
- Chairman: Jim Gregory
- Manager: Terry Venables
- Stadium: Loftus Road
- Second Division: 5th
- FA Cup: Runners-up
- Milk Cup: Fourth round
- Top goalscorer: League: Simon Stainrod (17); All: Simon Stainrod (24)
- Highest home attendance: 24,653 v Crystal Palace (FA Cup sixth round, 6 March 1982)
- Lowest home attendance: 8,753 v Grimsby Town (Second Division, 6 February 1982)
- Average home league attendance: 12,574
- Biggest win: 7-1 Vs Bolton Wanderers (1 May 1982)
- Biggest defeat: 0-4 Vs Watford (9 March 1982)
Home colours	Away colours

During the 1981–82 English football season, Queens Park Rangers competed in the Second Division and finished in 5th position. They also reached the FA Cup final for the first time in their history, losing the final after a replay to Tottenham Hotspur.

== Season summary ==
During the summer of 1981, Rangers installed an artificial Omniturf pitch at their Loftus Road ground. The opening match on the new surface - the first of its kind in British professional football - was a 2–1 defeat to Luton Town, who would install a synthetic pitch of their own a few years later. Despite this setback, Rangers proved difficult to beat at home, but away results were indifferent by comparison and they ultimately fell two points short of the third promotion spot.

In the FA Cup, Rangers beat Middlesbrough, Blackpool, Grimsby Town, Crystal Palace and West Bromwich Albion en route to the final at Wembley, where their opponents were holders Tottenham. Terry Fenwick's header salvaged a 1–1 draw after Glenn Hoddle had put Spurs in front, both goals coming in the second half of extra-time, but Hoddle converted a penalty in the sixth minute of the replay which proved decisive despite Rangers enjoying much of the possession for the remainder of the game.

== Omniturf ==
During the summer of 1981 an artificial pitch of Omniturf was installed at Loftus Road, the first such surface to be used in British professional football.The surface was not favoured by everyone, with QPR keeper Peter Hucker describing it as "basically a bit of carpet over two feet of concrete", and stated that as a goalkeeper, he strongly disliked diving onto it saying that "I'd have close to third degree burns because the pitch would totally rip the skin off."Rangers lost the first league match played on the new surface 1-2 versus Luton Town on 1 September 1981. During the time that Loftus Road had the Omniturf pitch installed, QPR reached two cup finals and became Second Division champions, something that critics claimed was caused by the advantage the pitch presented.

== Badge ==
A new centenary badge was unveiled on the FA Cup Final shirt, which remained in use until 2008

== Kit ==
Adidas remained as QPR's kit manufacturers.

== Second Division ==
Pos	Team	Pld	W	D	L	GF	GA	GD	Pts	Qualification or relegation
3	Norwich City (P)	42	22	5	15	64	50	+14	71	Promotion to the First Division
4	Sheffield Wednesday	42	20	10	12	55	51	+4	70	
5	Queens Park Rangers	42	21	6	15	65	43	+22	69	
6	Barnsley	42	19	10	13	59	41	+18	67	
7	Rotherham United	42	20	7	15	66	54	+12	67	

Rules for classification: 1) Points; 2) Goal difference; 3) Goals scored
(P) Promoted

== Results ==
QPR scores given first

Win Draw Loss

=== Second Division ===
Date	Opponents	Venue	Result F–A	Scorers	Attendance	Position
29 August 1981	Wrexham	A	3–1	King, Allen 2	4661	4
1 September 1981	Luton Town	H	1–2	King 35'	18,703	6
5 September 1981	Newcastle United	H	3–0	King, Roeder, Stainrod	14,176	3
12 September 1981	Grimsby Town	A	1–2	Gregory	9490	8
19 September 1981	Crystal Palace	H	1–0	Stainrod	17,039	6
22 September 1981	Oldham Athletic	A	0–2		6421	8
26 September 1981	Derby County	A	1–3	Gregory	11,246	14
3 October 1981	Blackburn Rovers	H	2–0	Gregory, Allen	9541	9
10 October 1981	Norwich City	H	2–0	Gregory, Stainrod	11,806	7
18 October 1981	Orient	A	1–1	Gillard	8192	6
24 October 1981	Leicester City	H	2–0	Stainrod, Gregory	12,419	4
31 October 1981	Charlton Athletic	A	2–1	Stainrod, Allen	11,333	5
7 November 1981	Rotherham United	H	1–1	Flanagan 80'	10,949	3
14 November 1981	Sheffield Wednesday	A	3–1	Stainrod 43' 45' 56'	17,024	3
21 November 1981	Shrewsbury Town	A	1–2	Flanagan	4765	4
24 November 1981	Oldham Athletic	H	0–0		9477	4
28 November 1981	Cardiff City	H	2–0	Stainrod 2	10,225	3
5 December 1981	Bolton Wanderers	A	0–1		6076	5
12 December 1981	Barnsley	H	1–0	Flanagan	10,972	4
19 December 1981	Cambridge United	A	PP			
26 December 1981	Chelsea	H	0–2		22,022	4
28 December 1981	Watford	A	PP			
5 January 1982	Middlesbrough	A	PP			
9 January 1982	Luton Town	A	PP			
16 January 1982	Wrexham	H	1–1	Stainrod	10,066	4
30 January 1982	Crystal Palace	A	0–0		15,267	6
6 February 1982	Grimsby Town	H	1–0	Gregory	8753	5
9 February 1982	Cambridge United	A	0–1		4822	6
16 February 1982	Blackburn Rovers	A	1–2	Allen	6884	7
20 February 1982	Derby County	H	3–0	Hazell, Fenwick, Flanagan	8890	6
27 February 1982	Norwich City	A	1–0	Roeder	15,928	7
9 March 1982	Watford	A	0–4		16,862	8
13 March 1982	Leicester City	A	2–3	Currie, Stainrod	17,821	9
20 March 1982	Charlton Athletic	H	4–0	Fenwick, Allen 3	13,118	7
27 March 1982	Rotherham United	A	0–1		10,472	9
29 March 1982	Sheffield Wednesday	H	2–0	Flanagan, Stainrod	11,710	8
6 April 1982	Orient	H	3–0	Hazell, Flanagan, Stainrod	10,531	7
10 April 1982	Chelsea	A	1–2	Gregory 40'	18,365	7
12 April 1982	Watford	H	0–0		22,091	7
17 April 1982	Shrewsbury Town	H	2–1	Flanagan, Allen	11,148	6
24 April 1982	Cardiff City	A	2–1	Allen, Micklewhite	5979	6
1 May 1982	Bolton Wanderers	H	7–1	Gregory, Micklewhite, Flanagan 2, Fenwick (pen), Stainrod, Allen	10,002	5
5 May 1982	Newcastle United	A	4–0	Gregory, Allen, Flanagan, Stainrod	10,670	5
8 May 1982	Barnsley	A	0–3		10,579	6
11 May 1982	Luton Town	A	2–3	Fenwick, Stainrod	16,657	6
15 May 1982	Cambridge United	H	2–1	Allen 27', Fenwick 59' (pen)	10,467	5

=== Milk Cup ===
Date	Round	Opponents	H / A	Result F–A	Scorers	Attendance
6 October 1981	Second Round First Leg	Portsmouth (Third Division)	H	5–0	Ellis (og), Gregory 2, Micklewhite 2	13,502
27 October 1981	Second Round Second Leg	Portsmouth (Third Division)	A	2–2	Flanagan, Micklewhite	7677
10 November 1981	Third Round	Bristol City (Third Division)	H	3–0	Flanagan, Stainrod, Allen	9215
1 December 1981	Fourth Round	Watford (Second Division)	A	1–4	Stainrod (pen)	18,276

=== FA Cup ===
Date	Round	Opponents	H / A	Result F–A	Scorers	Attendance
2 January 1982	Third Round	Middlesbrough (First Division)	H	1–1	Stainrod	12,100
18 January 1982	Third Round Replay	Middlesbrough (First Division)	A	3–2 (aet - 2–2 at 90 mins)	Stainrod 2, Neill	14,819
23 January 1982	Fourth Round	Blackpool (Fourth Division)	A	0–0		10,227
26 January 1982	Fourth Round Replay	Blackpool (Fourth Division)	H	5–1	Allen 4, Stainrod (pen)	11,712
13 February 1982	Fifth Round	Grimsby Town (Second Division)	H	3–1	Stainrod, Allen, Howe	13,344
6 March 1982	Sixth Round	Crystal Palace (Second Division)	H	1–0	Allen	24,653
3 April 1982	Semi-Final	West Bromwich Albion (First Division)	N	1–0	Allen 72'	45,015
22 May 1982	Final	Tottenham Hotspur (First Division)	N	1–1 (aet - 0–0 at 90 mins)	Fenwick 115'	100,000
27 May 1982	Final Replay	Tottenham Hotspur (First Division)	N	0–1		90,000

=== Friendly Matches ===
Date	Country	Opponents	H / A	Result F–A	Scorers
25 July 1981	Sweden	Stugens BK	A	6-0	Stainrod 2, King 2, Burridge, Sealy
27 July 1981	Sweden	Sandviks IK	A	8-1	Flanagan, Micklewhite 2, Stainrod, Waddock, Sealy 2, Muir
29 July 1981	Sweden	Spanga IS	A	1–0	Micklewhite
30 July 1981	Sweden	Enkopings	A	9-1	Flanagan 3, Micklewhite, Stainrod 2, Allen 2, Muir
2 August 1981	Sweden	Ludvika BK	A	4-1	Flanagan, Stainrod 2, Gregory
8 August 1981		Wimbledon	A		
12 August 1981		Maidstone United	A		
16 August 1981	Ireland	Athlone Town	A	4-3	Flanagan, Stainrod 3
18 August 1981	Ireland	Bohemians	A	3-0	Stainrod 2, Allen
22 August 1981		Cambridge United (A)	A		
August 1981		Nigeria (H)	H		Private
8 September 1981	Frank Holman Testimonial	Birmingham City (A)	A		
19 December 1981		Notts County (H)	H		
17 May 1982	Dave Clement Testimonial	Dave Clement XI (H)	H		
26 May 1982	USA	Tulsa Roughnecks (USA) (A)	A		POSTPONED
31 May 1982	USA	San Jose Earthquakes (USA) (A)	A		
7 June 1982	USA	Tulsa Roughnecks (USA) (A)	A		

== Squad ==
Pos.	Nat.	Name	League Appearances	League Goals	Milk Cup Appearances	Milk Cup Goals	F A Cup Appearances	F A Cup Goals	Total Appearances	Total Goals
GK	ENG	Peter Hucker	22				9		31	
GK	ENG	John Burridge	20		4				24	
GK	ENG	Graham Benstead								
DF	ENG	Ian Dawes	5						5	
DF	ENG	Terry Fenwick	36	5	4		8	1	48	6
DF	ENG	Ian Gillard	33(2)	1	4		9		46(2)	1
DF	JAM	Bob Hazell	23(1)	2	4		4		31(1)	2
DF	ENG	Ernie Howe	16		1		5	1	22	1
DF	NIR	Alan McDonald								
DF	ENG	Warren Neill	11				3(1)	1	14(1)	1
DF	ENG	Glenn Roeder	41	2	4		8		53	2
DF	ENG	Steve Wicks	9						9	
MF	ENG	Tony Currie	20	1	1		7		28	1
MF	ENG	Martin Duffield								
MF	ENG	Gerry Francis	7						7	
MF	ENG	John Gregory	34	9	4	2	7		45	11
MF	ENG	Andy King	4	3					4	3
MF	ENG	Gary Micklewhite	24(2)	2	3(1)	3	4(1)		31(4)	5
MF	IRE	Mark O'Connor	1						1	
MF	IRE	Gary Waddock	35		3		9		47	
MF	ENG	Dean Wilkins	(1)		1				1(1)	
FW	ENG	Clive Allen	36(1)	13	2	1	7	7	45(1)	21
FW	ENG	Steve Burke	2(10)		1(1)		(1)		3(12)	
FW	ENG	Martyn Busby								
FW	ENG	Wayne Fereday	2(2)				0(1)		2(3)	
FW	ENG	Mike Flanagan	36(1)	10	3	2	9		48(1)	12
FW	ENG	Ian Muir								
FW	ENG	Tony Sealy	4(3)		1				5(3)	
FW	ENG	Simon Stainrod	39	17	4	2	9	5	52	24
FW	NIR	Ian Stewart	2(1)		0(2)		1(1)		3(4)	

== Transfers Out ==
Name	from	Date	Fee	Date	Club	Fee
Don Shanks	Luton Town	November 29, 1974	£35,000	August 1981	Brighton & Hove Albion	Free
Barry Silkman	Brentford	October 30, 1980	£20,000	September 1981	Leyton Orient	£15,000
Andy King	Everton	September 12, 1980	£400,000	September 1981	West Bromwich Albion	£400,000
Dean Neal	Queens Park Rangers Juniors	January 1979		October 1981	Millwall	£80,000
Gordon Hill	Derby County	November 1979	£150,000	November 1981	Montreal Manic	
Gerry Francis	Crystal Palace	February 24, 1981	£150,000	January 1982	Coventry	£145,000
Tony Sealy	Crystal Palace	March 12, 1981	£80,000	February 1982	Port Vale	loan
Ian Gillard	Queens Park Rangers Juniors	October 7, 1968		June 1982	Aldershot	Free
Ernie Howe	Fulham	December 14, 1977	£55,000	June 1982	Portsmouth	Free

== Transfers In ==
Name	from	Date	Fee
Graham Benstead	Queens Park Rangers Juniors	July 1981	
Alan McDonald	Queens Park Rangers Juniors	August 12, 1981	
Martin Duffield	Queens Park Rangers Juniors	January 1982	
Steve Wicks	Crystal Palace	March 25, 1982	£325,000
