= 1979–80 Queens Park Rangers F.C. season =

English football club season

Queens Park Rangers
1979–80 season
- Chairman: Jim Gregory
- Manager: Tommy Docherty (resigned 6 May,- re-appointed 15 May)
- Stadium: Loftus Road
- Football League Second Division: 5th
- FA Cup: Third round
- Football League Cup: Fourth round
- Southern Junior Floodlit Cup: Finalist
- Top goalscorer: League: Clive Allen (26); All: Clive Allen (28)
- Highest home attendance: 26,598 v Chelsea (18 December 1979)
- Lowest home attendance: 8,372 v Oldham Athletic (16 February 1980)
- Average home league attendance: 14,087
- Biggest win: 7–0 Vs Burnley (27 October 1979)
- Biggest defeat: 1–4 Vs Leicester City (25 August 1979)
Home colours	Away colours

During the 1979–80 English football season, Queens Park Rangers competed in the Second Division

== Season summary ==
Tommy Docherty almost led the R's to promotion back to the first division as Rangers led the league in late November but fell away to finish 5th in his first season in charge.They led the division in goalscoring with the prolific Clive Allen scoring 28. In other Competitions there was an early exit in the F.A cup and defeat over two legs to eventual league cup winner Wolves.

== Kit ==
Adidas remained as QPR's kit manufacturers.

== League Table ==
Pos	Team	Pld	W	D	L	GF	GA	GD	Pts	Qualification or relegation
3	Birmingham City (P)	42	21	11	10	58	38	+20	53	Promotion to the First Division
4	Chelsea	42	23	7	12	66	52	+14	53	
5	Queens Park Rangers	42	18	13	11	75	53	+22	49	
6	Luton Town	42	16	17	9	66	45	+21	49	
7	West Ham United	42	20	7	15	54	43	+11	47	Qualification for the Cup Winners' Cup first round (Note: West Ham United qualified for the Cup Winners' Cup first round as the 1979–80 FA Cup winners.)

Rules for classification: 1) Points; 2) Goal difference; 3) Goals scored
(P) Promoted

== Results ==
QPR scores given first

Win Draw Loss

=== Second Division ===
Date	Opponents	Venue	Result F–A	Scorers	Attendance	Position
18 August 1979	Bristol Rovers	H	2–0	Allen, Goddard	12,652	4
22 August 1979	Cardiff City	A	0–1		11,656	9
25 August 1979	Leicester City	H	1–4	Allen	13,091	17
1 September 1979	Notts County	A	0–1		8,745	20
8 September 1979	Fulham	H	3–0	Currie 73', Allen, Goddard	17,105	16
15 September 1979	Swansea City	A	2–1	Burke, Stevenson OG	16,931	12
22 September 1979	West Ham United	H	3–0	Allen 2, Goddard	24,692	4
29 September 1979	Oldham Athletic	A	0–0		8,985	5
6 October 1979	Watford	A	2–1	Allen, Roeder	22,341	5
9 October 1979	Cardiff City	H	3–0	Allen ? (pen). 81', Roeder	12,225	2
13 October 1979	Preston North End	H	1–1	Goddard 28'	14,316	4
20 October 1979	Sunderland	A	0–3		25,201	7
27 October 1979	Burnley	H	7–0	Allen 2, Goddard 2, Brennan og, McCreery, Roeder	11,261	4
3 November 1979	Bristol Rovers	A	3–1	Roeder, Allen, Thomas og	8,401	2
10 November 1979	Luton Town	A	1–1	Allen	19,619	4
17 November 1979	Shrewsbury	H	2–1	McCreery, Roeder	12,048	2
24 November 1979	Charlton	H	4–0	Roeder 85', Bowles 48', Allen 11' (pen), 88'	13,013	1
1 December 1979	Cambridge United	A	1–2	Bowles	8,038	5
8 December 1979	Wrexham	H	2–2	Goddard 2	11,652	5
15 December 1979	Newcastle United	A	2–4	Goddard, Roeder	23,811	6
18 December 1979	Chelsea	H	2–2	Allen 36', 88'	26,598	3
26 December 1979	Orient (H)	H	pp			
29 December 1979	Leicester City	A	0–2		20,743	7
1 January 1980	Birmingham City	A	1–2	Allen	25,963	9
12 January 1980	Notts County	A	1–3	Allen	9,613	9
19 January 1980	Fulham	A	2–0	Waddock, Burke	11,539	9
2 February 1980	Swansea City	H	3–2	Goddard 40', 90', Allen 38' (pen)	11,153	7
9 February 1980	West Ham United	A	1–2	Allen	26,037	9
12 February 1980	Orient	H	0–0		11,361	9
16 February 1980	Oldham Athletic	H	4–3	Allen 7', 20' (pen), Goddard 54', McCreery 12'	8,372	6
23 February 1980	Preston North End	A	3–0	Allen, Roeder, Goddard	10,351	7
1 March 1980	Sunderland	H	0–0		15,613	7
8 March 1980	Burnley	A	3–0	Gillard, Allen, Shanks	7,579	5
14 March 1980	Watford	H	1–1	Currie	16,504	4
22 March 1980	Luton Town	H	2–2	Goddard 2', 31'	15,504	4
29 March 1980	Shrewsbury Town	A	0–3		9,150	7
2 April 1980	Chelsea	A	2–0	Busby 67', Burke 86'	31,401	5
5 April 1980	Birmingham City	H	1–1	Burke 90'	16,609	6
8 April 1980	Orient	A	1–1	Allen	9,389	6
12 April 1980	Cambridge United	H	2–2	Allen, Busby	11,643	6
19 April 1980	Charlton	A	2–2	Allen 2	6,975	6
26 April 1980	Newcastle United	H	2–1	Roeder, McCreery	11,245	6
3 May 1980	Wrexham	A	3–1	Hazell, Allen, Currie	6,268	5

=== Football League Cup ===
Date	Round	Opponents	H / A	Result F–A	Scorers	Attendance
28 August 1979	Second Round First Leg	Bradford City (Fourth Division)	H	2–1	Neal, McCreery	8,560
5 September 1979	Second Round Second Leg	Bradford City (Fourth Division)	A	2–0	Gillard, Roeder	11,372
25 September 1979	Third Round	Mansfield Town (Third Division)	A	3–0	Bowles, Allen, Currie	9,845
30 October 1979	Fourth Round	Wolverhampton Wanderers (First Division)	H	1–1	Allen	20,984
6 November 1979	Fourth Round Replay	Wolverhampton Wanderers (First Division)	A	0–1		26,014

=== FA Cup ===
Date	Round	Opponents	H / A	Result F–A	Scorers	Attendance
5 January 1980	Third Round	Watford (Second Division)	H	1–2	Hazell 6'	19,398

=== Friendly Matches ===
Date	Opponents	Location	H / A	Result F–A	Scorers	Attendance
29 July 1979	Frederikshavn (DNK)	Denmark	A			
31 July 1979	Ikast FS (DNK)	Denmark	A			
2 August 1979	Randers Freja (DNK)	Denmark	A			
12 August 1979	Drogheda United (IRL)	Ireland	A			
5 May 1980	Sunderland (A)	Mick Docherty Testimonial	A			
12 February 1980	Orient (H)		H			

== Squad ==
Pos.	Nat.	Name	League Appearances	League Goals	Cup Appearances	League Cup Goals	F A Cup Goals	Total Appearances	Total Goals
GK	ENG	Chris Woods	41		6			47	
GK	ENG	Andy Pape	1					1	
DF	ENG	Don Shanks	41	2	6			47	2
DF	ENG	Barry Wallace	5		1			8	
DF	ENG	Ian Gillard	38	1	5	1		43	2
DF	JAM	Bob Hazell	27	1	5		1	34	2
DF	ENG	Peter Davidson						1	
DF	ENG	Ernie Howe	4	1				5	
DF	ENG	Martyn Rogers	2					2	
DF	ENG	Glenn Roeder	40	8	5	1		45	9
DF	ENG	Steve Wicks	35		3			39	
MF	ENG	Tony Currie	27	3	5	1		33	4
MF	NIR	David McCreery	42	4	6	1		48	5
MF	WAL	Karl Elsey	4					4	
MF	ENG	Rachid Harkouk	1		1			6	
MF	ENG	Mickey Walsh	2		2			9	
MF	IRE	Gary Waddock	8	1	1			18	1
MF	ENG	Martyn Busby	8	1	1			11	1
FW	ENG	Gordon Hill	7		1			10	
FW	ENG	Steve Burke	28	4	1			34	4
FW	ENG	Clive Allen	39	28	6	2		45	30
FW	NIR	Billy Hamilton	1					1	
FW	ENG	Paul Goddard	40	16	4			45	16
FW	ENG	Dean Neal	5		1	1		8	1
FW	ENG	Stan Bowles	16	2	5	1		21	3

== Transfers Out ==
Name	from	Date	Fee	Date	Club	Fee
Dave Clement	Queens Park Rangers Juniors	19 July 1965		July 1979	Bolton	£150,000
John Hollins	Chelsea	10 July 1975	£85,000	July 1979	Arsenal	£75,000
Paul McGee	Sligo Rovers	17 November 1977	£15,000	October 1979	Preston	£100,000
Billy Hamilton	Linfield	30 April 1978	£25,000	November 1979	Burnley	£38,000
Peter Davidson	Berwick Rangers	27 June 1979	£30,000	December 1979	Berwick Rangers	£16,000
Derek Richardson	Chelsea	29 April 1976		December 1979	Sheffield United	£55,555
Stan Bowles	Carlisle	15 September 1972	£112,000	December 1979	Nottingham Forest	£250,000
Ron Abbott	Queens Park Rangers Juniors	12 July 1971		January 1980	Retired (Injury)	
Barry Wallace	Queens Park Rangers Juniors	August 1977		March 1980	Tulsa (USA)	£50,000
Rachid Harkouk	Crystal Palace	28 June 1978	£150,000	June 1980	Notts County	£50,000
Andy Pape	Feltham	March 1980		June 1980	Ikast FS	
Clive Allen	Queens Park Rangers Juniors	20 September 1978		June 1980	Arsenal	£1,250,000
Phil Nutt	Queens Park Rangers Juniors	1 July 1975		June 1980	Hounslow	Free

== Transfers In ==
Name	from	Date	Fee
Gary Micklewhite	Manchester United	4 July 1979	Free
Mark Hill	Queens Park Rangers Juniors	July 1979	
Martyn Rogers	Manchester United	26 July 1979	£7,500
Gary Waddock	Queens Park Rangers Juniors	26 July 1979	
Tony Currie	Leeds United	9 August 1979	£400,000
David McCreery	Manchester United	16 August 1979	£200,000
Steve Wicks	Derby County	20 September 1979	£275,000
Bob Hazell	Wolverhampton Wanderers	1 September 1979	£240,000
Steve Burke	Nottingham Forest	1 September 1979	£125,000
Gordon Hill	Derby County	22 November 1979	£150,000
Andy Pape	Feltham	March 1980	
Dean Wilkins	Queens Park Rangers Juniors	17 May 1980	
Ian Stewart	Queens Park Rangers Juniors	9 May 1980	
Mark O'Connor	Queens Park Rangers Juniors	June 1980	
