= Kevin Grant (soccer) =

Canadian soccer player (born 1952)

Personal information
- Date of birth: 25 July 1952 (age 74)
- Place of birth: Willesden, England
- Height: 1.91 m (6 ft 3 in)
- Position: Defender

Senior career*
Years	Team	Apps	(Gls)
1972	East Hamilton Legion		
1973–1976	Hamilton Croatia		
1978	Hamilton Italo-Canadians		
1980	Buffalo Blazers		
1981–1985	Hamilton Steelers		
1983	Toronto Nationals		

International career
1971–1976	Canada U23	11	(0)
1972–1974	Canada	8	(0)

Managerial career
- 1982: Hamilton Steelers
- 1983: Toronto Nationals
- 1986–1987: Hamilton Steelers
- 1990: Hamilton White Eagles
- * Club domestic league appearances and goals

Kevin Grant (born 25 July 1952) is a Canadian former international soccer player who played for the Canada men's national soccer team between 1971 and 1976, and is currently the U17 head coach for Hamilton United Elite girls program.

== Playing career ==
Grant was born in London, England, and moved to Burlington, Ontario at the age of 15. He played club soccer with East Hamilton Cougars, East Hamilton Legion, and Hamilton Croatia. Despite being an international in the 1970s he did not play as a professional in the North American Soccer League. In 1978, he played in the National Soccer League with Hamilton Italo-Canadians. He signed with Buffalo Blazers for the 1980 season.

In 1981, he played with the Hamilton Steelers, and won the NSL Championship. In 1983, he played with the Toronto Nationals of the Canadian Professional Soccer League.

On 8 May 2014, he was inducted into the Hamilton Soccer Hall of Fame as a player.

== International career ==
Grant played with the Canada U-23 team, and made his debut on 24 August 1971 against Mexico, and played two matches in the 1976 Summer Olympics. He also participated in the 1975 Pan American Games, and featured in three matches. He made his senior team debut on 24 August 1972 against Mexico in a FIFA World Cup qualifier match and later featured in eight additional matches.

== Managerial career ==
Grant coached in the National Soccer League with the Hamilton Steelers in 1982 and secured the NSL Championship after defeating Toronto Italia. In 1983, he succeeded Frank Pike along with Colin Franks as the two co-head coaches for Toronto Nationals in the Canadian Professional Soccer League. In 1986, he returned to manage the Hamilton Steelers where he secured the inaugural Canadian Soccer League championship.

In 1990, he returned to the NSL circuit to be named the head coach for the Hamilton White Eagles in the league's second division.

In 2015, Grant along with Tony Taylor formed the Burlington Futbol Academy. Grant is currently the head coach with Hamilton United Elite with their U17 Ontario Player Development League (OPDL) Girls program.
