= Hans Kraay =

Hans Kraay may refer:

- Hans Kraay Sr. (1936–2017), former Dutch footballer
- Hans Kraay Jr. (born 1958), former Dutch footballer
