= Canadian Professional Soccer League =

The Canadian Professional Soccer League refers to one of two former semi-professional Canadian soccer leagues:

- Canadian Professional Soccer League (1998–2005), now known as the Canadian Soccer League
- Canadian Professional Soccer League (1983)
