= Hans-Günter Neues =

German footballer and coach

Personal information
- Date of birth: 14 November 1950
- Place of birth: Büttgen, West Germany
- Date of death: 16 November 2016 (aged 66)
- Height: 1.86 m (6 ft 1 in)
- Position: Defender

Senior career*
Years	Team	Apps	(Gls)
1971–1975	Fortuna Köln	68	(3)
1975–1977	Rot-Weiss Essen	70	(0)
1977–1983	1. FC Kaiserslautern	131	(15)
1983	Toronto Nationals		

Managerial career
- 1988–1989: Rot-Weiss Essen
- 1989–1990: Kickers Offenbach
- 1991–1992: EFC Stahl
- 1995: Waldhof Mannheim
- * Club domestic league appearances and goals

Hans-Günter Neues (14 November 1950 – 16 November 2016) was a German football player and coach. As a player, he spent nine seasons in the Bundesliga with SC Fortuna Köln, Rot-Weiss Essen and 1. FC Kaiserslautern. In 1983, he played with the Toronto Nationals of the Canadian Professional Soccer League. He died of cancer in 2016.

== Honours ==
- DFB-Pokal finalist: 1980–81
