= André Oostrom =

Dutch footballer (1952–2025)

Personal information
- Date of birth: 17 October 1952
- Place of birth: Utrecht, Netherlands
- Date of death: 23 August 2025 (aged 72)
- Position: Midfielder

Senior career*
Years	Team	Apps	(Gls)
1974–1977	FC Utrecht	95	(2)
1977–1979	VVV-Venlo	50	(1)
1980–1982	Edmonton Drillers	62	(3)
1980–1982	Edmonton Drillers (indoor)	31	(16)
1983	Toronto Nationals		
1982–1986	Go Ahead Eagles	87	(1)
Total		294	(7)
- * Club domestic league appearances and goals

André Oostrom (17 October 1952 – 23 August 2025) was a Dutch professional footballer who played as a midfielder. Active in both the Netherlands and North America, Oostrom made nearly 300 career league appearances.

== Career ==
Born in Utrecht, Oostrom began his professional career with his hometown club of FC Utrecht in 1974. Oostrom moved to VVV-Venlo in 1977, before moving to the North American Soccer League in 1980, to play with the Edmonton Drillers. In 1983, he played with the Toronto Nationals of the Canadian Professional Soccer League. In 1983, Oostrom returned to the Netherlands, playing with the Go Ahead Eagles until 1986.

== Death ==
Oostrom died after a short illness on 23 August 2025, at the age of 72.
