= Tony Sealy =

English footballer

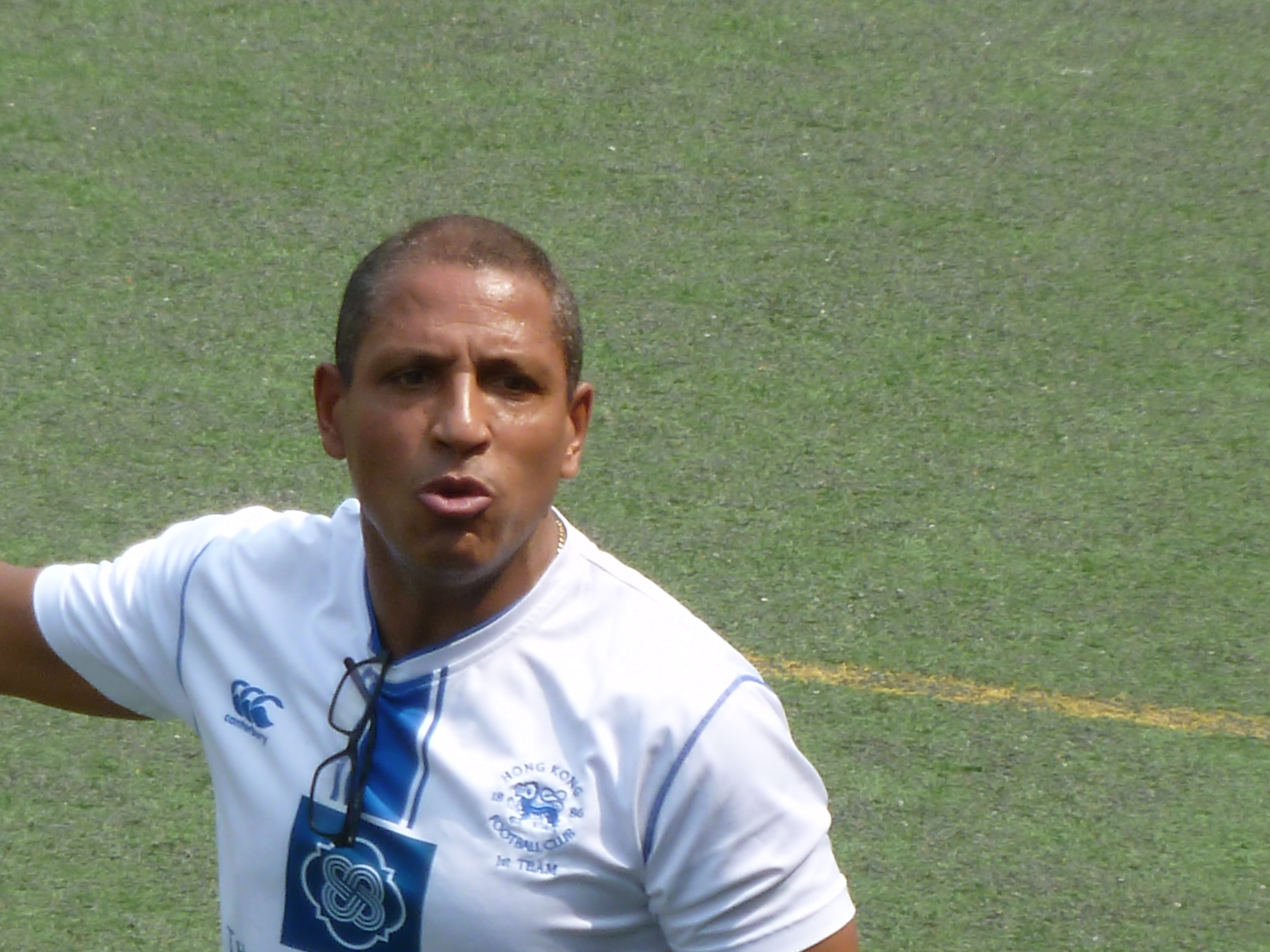
- Sealy in 2014

Personal information
- Full name: Anthony John Sealy
- Date of birth: 7 May 1959 (age 67)
- Place of birth: Hackney, London, England
- Height: 5 ft 8 in (1.73 m)
- Position: Forward

Youth career
- Wallsend Boys Club
- 1975–1977: Southampton

Senior career*
Years	Team	Apps	(Gls)
1977–1979	Southampton	7	(0)
1979–1981	Crystal Palace	24	(5)
1980	→ Port Vale (loan)	17	(6)
1981–1983	Queens Park Rangers	63	(18)
1982	→ Port Vale (loan)	6	(4)
1983	→ Fulham (loan)	5	(1)
1984–1985	Fulham	20	(10)
1985–1987	Leicester City	39	(7)
1987	→ AFC Bournemouth (loan)	13	(2)
1987–1988	Sporting CP	29	(9)
1988	S.C. Braga	4	(0)
1988–1989	Brentford	12	(4)
1989	Swindon Town	0	(0)
1989–1991	Bristol Rovers	37	(7)
1991	MYPA	7	(0)
1991–1992	Brentford	18	(0)
1992–1993	Michelotti		(10)
1993–1994	Eastern		(5)
1994–1996	Hong Kong FC		
Total		301+	(88+)

Managerial career
- 1995–2016: Hong Kong FC
- * Club domestic league appearances and goals

Anthony John Sealy (born 7 May 1959) is an English former footballer who played as a forward.

He graduated from Wallsend Boys Club to Southampton. He appeared for the "Saints" in the 1979 Football League Cup final after helping the club win promotion out of the Second Division in 1977–78. He joined Crystal Palace in 1979 before moving on to Queens Park Rangers two years later. After a loan spell at Port Vale, he helped QPR to top the Second Division 1982–83. He signed with Fulham in 1984 before ending up at Leicester City a year later. In 1987, he was loaned out to AFC Bournemouth before moving to Portugal to sign with Sporting CP and later S.C. Braga. He returned to England in 1988, spending brief periods at Brentford, Swindon Town, and Bristol Rovers. He won Third Division championship medals with Bristol Rovers in 1989–90 and with Brentford in 1991–92. In 1991, he played for Finnish side MYPA before returning to Brentford. He then moved to Hong Kong, playing for Michelotti, Eastern, and Hong Kong FC.

He was appointed manager at Hong Kong FC in 1995. Under his management the club won the Second Division in 1997–98, 1998–99, 2000–01, 2004–05, 2005–06, 2009–10, and won promotion in 2013–14, but failed to establish themselves in the First Division.

== Playing career ==
Sealy was born in Hackney, London, to a Barbadian father, and grew up in Newcastle upon Tyne. He signed his first professional contract with Lawrie McMenemy's Southampton in 1977. He was the second black player to play for Southampton after Alf Charles in 1937. The "Saints" won promotion to the First Division as Second Division runners-up in 1977–78. He appeared as a substitute in the 1979 League Cup final at Wembley, replacing Austin Hayes after 83 minutes; Nottingham Forest won the game 3–2.

Sealy signed with top-flight rivals Crystal Palace on 29 March 1979, then managed by Terry Venables. Whilst at Palace he was sent out on loan to John McGrath's Port Vale in February 1980; after impressing at Vale Park with six goals in 17 Fourth Division games, he returned to Selhurst Park in May of that year. Palace were relegated in 1980–81, and Sealy followed Venables to Second Division Queens Park Rangers for a fee of £80,000 in March 1981.

Sealy made his QPR debut in the 3–1 win over Derby County in March 1981 and played 63 league games, scoring 18 goals. In February 1982, he was once more loaned out to Port Vale, once again impressing with four goals in six games; but the club could not afford to secure his services permanently, and he returned to Rangers the following month. In 1982–83, he finished as QPR's top scorer with 16 goals (ahead of Clive Allen and Simon Stainrod), and Rangers topped the Second Division, finishing ten points ahead of Wolverhampton Wanderers.

After a loan spell with Fulham, he moved to Craven Cottage permanently in 1984. Following a ninth-place finish in the Second Division in 1984–85, he again switched clubs, this time settling with Leicester City. He helped Gordon Milne's side to avoid relegation out of the top-flight by a single point in 1985–86; however, the "Foxes" were relegated in 1986–87. Following a loan spell with Harry Redknapp's AFC Bournemouth, where he won the 3rd Division title Sealy then left the UK and played for Portuguese side Sporting CP, scoring four goals in the 1987–88 Cup Winners' Cup. He played both legs of the 1987 Supertaça Cândido de Oliveira final victory over Benfica. Lisbon finished fourth in the Primeira Liga in 1987–88, and Sealy moved on to mid-table side S.C. Braga.

He then returned to London to play for Brentford in the Third Division; Steve Perryman's "Bees" missed out on the play-offs by four points in 1988–89, and Sealy moved to Bristol Rovers via Swindon Town. Rovers topped the Third Division in 1989–90 under manager Gerry Francis, two points ahead of rivals City. After the 1990–91 campaign, Sealy moved to Finland with MYPA, returning to Brentford in 1991. Brentford won the Third Division in 1991–92, after which Sealy moved to Hong Kong the next year with Michelotti, Eastern and Hong Kong FC.

== Management career ==
He became manager of Hong Kong FC in 1995, a position he maintained until 2002 when he was promoted to Operations Manager. HKFC became a classic "yo-yo" club, winning promotion as Second Division champions in 1997–98, they actually refused promotion to the First Division, and so again topped the Second Division in 1998–99. After winning the division again in 2000–01, they this time accepted promotion but only managed four points from twelve games in 2001–02, but were not relegated despite finishing in last place. They finished bottom again in 2002–03, but won the Second Division again in 2004–05 and 2005–06. They finished ninth in the ten-team First Division in 2006–07, and were again relegated. They won promotion as Second Division champions in 2009–10, but picked up just five points from 18 games in 2010–11, and so were again relegated. The club finished third in 2011–12, finishing one point behind promoted Southern District RSA. After a fifth-place finish in 2012–13, promotion was secured with a third-place finish in 2013–14.

== Personal life ==
His son, Jack, is also a football player and has represented Hong Kong at international level.

== Career statistics ==
Appearances and goals by club, season and competition
Club	Season	League			FA Cup		Other		Total	
Club	Season	Division	Apps	Goals	Apps	Goals	Apps	Goals	Apps	Goals
Southampton	1977–78	Second Division	2	0	0	0	0	0	2	0
Southampton	1978–79	First Division	5	0	0	0	1	0	6	0
Southampton	Total		7	0	0	0	1	0	8	0
Crystal Palace	1978–79	Second Division	5	0	0	0	0	0	5	0
Crystal Palace	1979–80	First Division	0	0	0	0	0	0	0	0
Crystal Palace	1980–81	Second Division	19	5	1	0	2	0	22	5
Crystal Palace	Total		24	5	1	0	2	0	27	5
Port Vale (loan)	1979–80	Fourth Division	17	6	0	0	0	0	17	6
Queens Park Rangers	1980–81	Second Division	8	2	0	0	0	0	8	2
Queens Park Rangers	1981–82	Second Division	7	0	0	0	1	0	8	0
Queens Park Rangers	1982–83	Second Division	40	16	1	0	2	0	43	16
Queens Park Rangers	1983–84	First Division	8	0	0	0	1	0	9	0
Queens Park Rangers	Total		63	18	1	0	4	0	68	18
Port Vale (loan)	1981–82	Fourth Division	6	4	0	0	0	0	6	4
Fulham	1983–84	Second Division	5	1	0	0	0	0	5	1
Fulham	1984–85	Second Division	13	7	0	0	0	0	13	7
Fulham	1985–86	Second Division	7	3	0	0	0	0	7	3
Fulham	Total		25	11	0	0	0	0	25	11
Leicester City	1985–86	First Division	21	6	0	0	2	0	23	6
Leicester City	1986–87	First Division	18	1	0	0	2	0	20	1
Leicester City	Total		39	7	0	0	4	0	43	7
AFC Bournemouth (loan)	1986–87	Third Division	13	2	0	0	0	0	13	2
Brentford	1988–89	Third Division	12	4	1	0	1	0	14	4
Swindon Town	1989–90	Second Division	0	0	0	0	0	0	0	0
Bristol Rovers	1989–90	Third Division	19	3	1	0	4	1	24	4
Bristol Rovers	1990–91	Second Division	18	4	0	0	0	0	18	4
Bristol Rovers	Total		37	7	1	0	4	1	42	8
Brentford	1991–92	Third Division	18	0	3	1	1	2	22	3
Career total			261	64	7	1	17	3	285	68

== Honours ==
Southampton

- Football League Second Division second-place promotion: 1977–78
- Football League Cup runner-up: 1978–79

Queens Park Rangers

- Football League Second Division: 1982–83

Bournemouth

- Football League Third Division: 1986–87

Sporting CP

- Supertaça Cândido de Oliveira: 1987

Bristol Rovers

- Football League Third Division: 1989–90

Brentford

- Football League Third Division: 1991–92

Hong Kong FC

- Hong Kong Second Division League: 1997–98, 1998–99, 2000–01, 2004–05, 2005–06, 2009–10
- Hong Kong Second Division League third-place promotion: 2013–14
