= Calgary Mustangs =

The Calgary Mustangs may refer to:

- Calgary Mustangs (ice hockey), a former Junior A hockey team
- Calgary Mustangs (CPSL), short-lived soccer team which participated in the shortlived Canadian Professional Soccer League of 1983
- Calgary Mustangs (USL), a soccer team that began as the Calgary Storm and played in the USL PDL and USL A-League
