= John Baretta =

Canadian retired soccer goalkeeper

Personal information
- Date of birth: May 6, 1955 (age 71)
- Place of birth: Edmonton, Alberta, Canada
- Position: Goalkeeper

College career
Years	Team	Apps	(Gls)
–1978	Eastern Illinois Panthers		

Senior career*
Years	Team	Apps	(Gls)
1979	Indianapolis Daredevils		
1980–1981	Edmonton Drillers	19	(0)
1980–1982	Edmonton Drillers (indoor)	35	(0)
1982–1983	Buffalo Stallions (indoor)	5	(0)
1983	Toronto Nationals		
1983–1986	Tacoma Stars (indoor)	85	(0)
1986	Los Angeles Lazers (indoor)	1	(0)
1987	Edmonton Brick Men	4	(0)
1988	Cleveland Force (indoor)	0	(0)

Managerial career
- 1987–1988: Cleveland Force (assistant)
- * Club domestic league appearances and goals

John Baretta (born May 6, 1955) is a Canadian retired soccer goalkeeper who played in the North American Soccer League, Major Indoor Soccer League and American Soccer League.

Baretta attended Eastern Illinois University where he was a 1978 All American soccer player. John was regarded as one of the all-time best at the collegiate level by renowned college coach Schellas Hyndman. In 1979, he turned professional with the Indianapolis Daredevils of the American Soccer League. In 1980, he moved to the Edmonton Drillers of North American Soccer League. In 1983, he played with the Toronto Nationals of the Canadian Professional Soccer League. In November 1986, Baretta signed a ten-day contract with the Los Angeles Lazers. In 1987, he played with the Edmonton Brick Men. In 1987, he became an assistant coach with the Cleveland Force. At the end of April 1988, the Force activated Baretta as a player after a series of injuries decimated the team's goalkeeper corps. He continued to act as the backup goalkeeper into the playoffs, but never entered a game. In the early 1990s, he returned to the Pacific Northwest where he coaches youth and high school soccer. He is now a teacher and health and fitness coach at Gray M.S.

On March 1, 2018, Baretta was hit by a car while walking home from Gray, suffering a traumatic brain injury and a broken left tibia.
