= Franz Hiller =

German footballer

Personal information
- Date of birth: 22 October 1950 (age 76)
- Place of birth: Munich, West Germany
- Height: 1.70 m (5 ft 7 in)
- Position: Midfielder

Senior career*
Years	Team	Apps	(Gls)
1969–1973	1860 Munich	18	(2)
1973–1974	Elche	33	(1)
1974–1980	Werder Bremen	162	(4)
1980–1983	Nordstern Basel	56	(2)
1983	Calgary Mustangs		
- * Club domestic league appearances and goals

Franz Hiller (born 22 October 1950) is a German retired footballer who played for TSV 1860 Munich and Werder Bremen, as well as Elche CF in Spain. In 1983, he played for the Calgary Mustangs of the Canadian Professional Soccer League.
