= Ciaccia =

Ciaccia is an Italian surname. Notable people with the surname include:

- Frank Ciaccia (born 1959), Canadian soccer player
- John Ciaccia (1933–2018), Italian-born Canadian politician

== See also ==
- Cianciana, municipality in Sicily
