= Toronto Nationals =

The Toronto Nationals may refer to the following sports teams:

- Toronto Nationals (soccer) (1983), association football club which participated in the shortlived Canadian Professional Soccer League
- Toronto Nationals (ice hockey) (1970–80), a pair of defunct II Junior "A" & Junior "B" ice hockey teams from Vaughan, Ontario, Canada
- Toronto Nationals (lacrosse) (2009–10), a defunct Major League Lacrosse team
- Toronto Nationals (cricket) (2018–24), one of the teams created in 2018 for the Global T20 Canada cricket league
