= Joe Raduka =

Serbian-American soccer player and coach

Personal information
- Full name: Jovica Raduka
- Date of birth: January 18, 1954 (age 72)
- Place of birth: Velika Gorica, PR Croatia, FPR Yugoslavia
- Height: 5 ft 9 in (1.75 m)
- Position: Defender

Senior career*
| Years | Team | Apps | (Gls) |
| 1974–1975 | Red Star Belgrade | 2 | (0) |
| 1978 | Oakland Stompers | 6 | (0) |
| 1979–1982 | Edmonton Drillers | 85 | (0) |
| 1979–1980 | → Namur (loan) | | |
| 1982–1983 | Golden Bay Earthquakes (MISL) | 44 | (1) |
| 1983 | Edmonton Eagles | | (0) |
| 1983–1987 | Cleveland Force (indoor) | 105 | (6) |

Managerial career
- 1989–1990: Cleveland Crunch (assistant)
- 1998–1999: Cleveland Crunch (assistant)
- * Club domestic league appearances and goals

Jovica "Joe" Raduka (Serbian Cyrillic: Јовица "Џо" Paдукa; born January 18, 1954) is a former Serbian-American soccer player who began his career with Red Star Belgrade before spending time with indoor and outdoor teams in the U.S., Canada and Belgium. He currently runs a youth soccer club in Cleveland, Ohio.

== Player ==
=== Professional ===
Raduka began his professional career with Yugoslav First League club Red Star Belgrade. On February 9, 1978, Raduka signed a two-year contract with the Oakland Stompers of the North American Soccer League (NASL). At the end of the 1978 season, the Stompers relocated to Edmonton, Alberta, Canada where they were renamed the Edmonton Drillers. Raduka played four seasons in Edmonton. Additionally, he spent the 1979-1980 NASL off-season with Belgian club Namur. The loan came about as a result of fellow Serb Milan Mandarić who owned the San Jose Earthquakes as well as part ownership of Namur.

While the Drillers performed poorly outdoors, they did gain an NASL indoor title in 1981. However, the team folded at the end of the 1982 outdoor season and Raduka moved to the Golden Bay Earthquakes. The Earthquakes, an NASL team, was spending the 1982-1983 indoor season with the Major Indoor Soccer League (MISL). In 1983, he spent the outdoor season with the Edmonton Eagles of the Canadian Professional Soccer League (CPSL). That league lasted only one season before collapsing and Raduka returned to the U.S. to rejoin the MISL. However, the Earthquakes had returned to the NASL so Raduka joined the Cleveland Force. He would spend the next four seasons with the Force until the team folded in 1987.

=== National team ===
In 1971, Raduka was the captain of the Yugoslav junior national team.

== Coach ==
When the Force folded, Raduka retired from playing professionally and began his coaching career. He first coached a local German club (Danubschauben) team in Olmsted Falls. Many of the players that played for him found their way onto Cleveland All-Star teams. He founded a Cleveland soccer club, Cleveland United, where he has remained as director and coach. In addition to coaching youth teams, Raduka was an assistant coach with the Cleveland Crunch of MISL in 1989–1990.
