= Edmonton Eagles =

Canadian soccer team

- Full name: Edmonton Eagles Soccer Club
- Founded: 1983
- Stadium: Clarke Stadium
- Owner: John Tiemessen
- Coach: Dieter Hochheimer
- League: Canadian Professional Soccer League
- 1983 CPSL: Champions

The Edmonton Eagles were a Canadian professional soccer team in Edmonton, Alberta that competed in the original Canadian Professional Soccer League in 1983. They finished as champions in the league's only season.

== History ==

After the Edmonton Drillers of the North American Soccer League folded following the 1982 season, a new professional team was founded by local business man, John Tiemessen, to play in the inaugural season of the new Canadian Professional Soccer League in 1983. Much of the Drillers fanbase carried over to support the Eagles, although they did not receive much television coverage, although some matches were carried by local radio station CKER-FM. Two local companies - Sorrento Restaurant and Lounge and 126 CFRN Radio partnered to purchase 15,000 tickets to matches to distribute to youth soccer players under the age of 14 to watch matches, as part of the Eagles Junior Fan Club.

Their first match was played on May 22 on the road against Hamilton Steelers, which they won by a score of 2–1. Their home opener came in their third game of the season, on May 29, also against Hamilton, which resulted in a 1–1 draw, in front of a crowd of 7,138 spectators at Clarke Stadium, which was their highest attendance of the season.

After two of the six league clubs folded in mid-June, the decision was made to abandon the remainder of the regular season and proceed directly to the playoffs on July 12. The Eagles were sitting in first place at the time with a record of 7 wins, 3 draws, and 0 losses, finishing five points ahead of second place Hamilton, despite having played two less games. In the first round, they defeated the lowest ranked Calgary Mustangs in the best-of-three season, winning the first two matches (the third match was not played as it was not needed). In the one-match winner-take-all championship final, they defeated Hamilton 2–0, in front of over 7000 fans, to finish as league champions and win the Tip Top Cup.

The day after the final, the league announced it was folding, ending the tenure of the Eagles. The Eagles had been in a tough financial state for much of their tenure that season, with players not being paid in the latter months of the season, including for the championship final, and some players were not paid at all.

== Season ==
Season	Tier	League	Record	Rank	Playoffs	Ref
1983 (Note: The 1983 CPSL regular season was cancelled partway through the season and playoffs began immediately after it)	1	Canadian Professional Soccer League	7–3–0	1st	Champions	

== Notable players ==
The following players played for the Eagles:

- (Canada) John Connor
- (Netherlands) Hans Kraay Jr.
- (Bosnia and Herzegovina) Dubravko Ledić
- (Canada) Norm Odinga
- (Canada) Ross Ongaro
- (Canada) Tony Pesznecker
- (Canada) Darren Poole
- (Serbia) (United States) Joe Raduka
- (Chile) Carlos Rivas
- (Canada) Randy Samuel
