= Colin Franks =

English footballer (born 1951)

Personal information
- Full name: Colin James Franks
- Date of birth: 16 April 1951 (age 75)
- Place of birth: Wembley, London, England
- Positions: Midfielder; defender

Youth career
- Boreham Wood
- Uxbridge

Senior career*
Years	Team	Apps	(Gls)
1967–1969	Wealdstone		
1969–1973	Watford	112	(8)
1973–1979	Sheffield United	150	(2)
1979–1982	Toronto Blizzard	103	(10)
1982	Edmonton Drillers	11	(1)
1983	Toronto Nationals		
- * Club domestic league appearances and goals

Colin James Franks (born 16 April 1951) is an English former footballer. At the start of his career he played predominantly as a midfielder, but he was increasingly used as a defender towards the end of his career.

Born in Wembley, Franks started his career as an amateur in the North London and Hertfordshire area, with Boreham Wood, Uxbridge and Wealdstone. He turned professional in 1969, joining newly promoted Second Division side Watford. Although largely a reserve during his first two seasons at the club, he played a part in Watford's run to the semi-finals of the 1969–70 FA Cup, and played in the third-place play-off match.

Franks established himself as a regular in the Watford first team in the 1971–72 season with 44 appearances, but his team were unable to stave off relegation to the Third Division. Nonetheless, Franks consolidated on his individual progress in 1972–73, playing all 50 competitive Watford fixtures and finishing second in the inaugural Watford F.C. Player of the Season vote. At the end of the season, he transferred to First Division Sheffield United for a fee of £60,000.

After six years and 150 league appearances for United, Franks joined Canadian North American Soccer League franchise Toronto Blizzard for the start of their 1979 season. He played for them in both the North American Soccer League and NASL indoor. In 1982, he had a brief spell at Edmonton Drillers. In 1983, he played with the Toronto Nationals of the Canadian Professional Soccer League.
