= John Connor (soccer) =

Canadian former soccer player

Personal information
- Date of birth: 8 June 1953 (age 73)
- Place of birth: Glasgow, Scotland
- Positions: Midfielder; forward

Senior career*
Years	Team	Apps	(Gls)
1983	Edmonton Eagles	?	(5)

International career
1975–1983	Canada Olympic	10	(1)
1983	Canada	4	(0)
- * Club domestic league appearances and goals

John Connor (born 8 June 1953) is a Canadian former soccer player.

He played for the Edmonton Eagles of the Canadian Professional Soccer League, where he was part of the championship winning team.

He played for the Canadian Olympic team from 1975 to 1983. He also earned 4 caps for the Canadian senior national team in 1983.
