= Frank Ciaccia =

Canadian former soccer player

Personal information
- Date of birth: 11 September 1959 (age 67)
- Place of birth: Vancouver, British Columbia, Canada

Youth career
- –: Simon Fraser University

Senior career*
Years	Team	Apps	(Gls)
1981–1982	Toronto Blizzard (indoor)	7	(4)
1982	Toronto Blizzard	0	(0)
1983	Toronto Nationals		

International career
1981	Canada	3	(0)
- * Club domestic league appearances and goals

Frank Ciaccia (born 11 September 1959) is a Canadian former soccer player who earned three caps for the national team in 1981. Born in Vancouver, he played college soccer for Simon Fraser University, before beginning a professional career with the Toronto Blizzard of the North American Soccer League. In 1983, he played with the Toronto Nationals of the Canadian Professional Soccer League. He joined the New Westminster Police Service in 1984, and as of May 2010 is the Inspector On Assignment.
