= Tony Pesznecker =

Canadian soccer player

Tony Peszneker
Personal information
- Date of birth: February 11, 1958 (age 68)
- Place of birth: Calgary, Alberta, Canada
- Height: 1.75 m (5 ft 9 in)
- Position: Defender

Youth career
- 1977–1980: Midwestern State

Senior career*
Years	Team	Apps	(Gls)
1980–1981	Minnesota Kicks	42	(5)
1983	Edmonton Eagles	?	(0)
1982–1985	Wichita Wings (indoor)	103	(5)
1987	Edmonton Brick Men	20	(1)
1987–1988	Memphis Storm (indoor)		
1990–1995	Minnesota Thunder		
- * Club domestic league appearances and goals as of July 24, 2008

Tony Peszneker (born February 11, 1958) is a former Canadian professional soccer player.

Peszneker played professionally for both the Minnesota Kicks of the North American Soccer League and the Minnesota Thunder of the USL. He also played for the Edmonton Eagles and Edmonton Brick Men in professional outdoor leagues and Wichita Wings and Memphis Storm in professional indoor leagues. Peszneker was inducted into the Thunder Hall of Fame in 1996. Currently, he is the girls soccer coach at Wayzata High School in Wayzata, Minnesota, where he was named one of the National Soccer Coaches Association of America coaches of the year in 2003 and recently got his 500th win.
