= Chelsea TV =

British television channel

Ownership
- Owner: Chelsea FC

History
- Launched: 13 August 2001
- Closed: 30 June 2019

Links
- Website: www.chelseafc.com

Chelsea TV was a British subscription based sports television channel, dedicated to the fans of the English football club, Chelsea F.C. The channel first launched in August 2001 on Sky Digital. The station was registered with Ofcom as Chelsea Digital Media Ltd. It was broadcast daily from 10:00am to midnight. Until it was removed in early 2010, it used to be broadcast in Channel 427 on UPC Ireland.

== Programming ==
Chelsea TV was broadcast live everyday from 10am to midnight from the studios at Stamford Bridge.

Top shows included Friday Night Live which broadcast each Friday with former players Kerry Dixon and Jason Cundy. Friday Night Live allowed fans to call in and share their views on all things Chelsea. The show regularly had first team players join the phone-in, the 2009–10 season saw Didier Drogba, Frank Lampard, Mikel John Obi, Florent Malouda and Salomon Kalou all answer the fans' questions.

Live build-up to midweek games was on Matchnight Live which broadcast from 6pm and had previews to the game, team news first and analysis. Every midweek game followed with a live fans' phone-in from 10pm. Chelsea TV was the only place to watch the Chelsea Reserves and Academy Teams in action. Reserves Live had full coverage of every Reserve game some of which took place at Griffin Park in the London Borough of Hounslow, the old home ground of Brentford up until August 2020.

Blues News was the daily news programme with headlines at 1pm and 5pm followed by a full news bulletin at 6.30pm and 10pm. Paper View was broadcast live from the studios every Thursday with the finest Fleet Street reporters discussing the news surrounding the club. Inside Cobham showed the week's training sessions and exclusive players interviews from the Chelsea's training ground in Cobham, Surrey. Exclusive interviews from the first team players and management was seen on The Big Interview. Many new shows and series were shown throughout the year. In 2009 a new fans' post-match phone-in was introduced called "Extra time at the Bridge" this allowed fans' to share their views after every weekend home game by calling the studio or emailing Chelsea TV.

== Presenters ==
The channel had various presenters, including former players Jason Cundy, Tommy Langley, Scott Minto and Kerry Dixon. Regular hosts included Gigi Salmon, Alison Bender, Ben Andrews, Lee Parker as well as Neil Barnett.

Chelsea matches were mainly commentated by Trevor Harris, Ben Andrews (who hosted the 2007 Football League Cup final, the 2007 FA Cup final and the 2008 UEFA Champions League final), Mark Tompkins, Matt Davies-Adams, Dan Roebuck and Gary Taphouse. Co-commentators include Clive Walker, Jason Cundy, and Sam Parkin.

Gigi Salmon later presented many shows on the channel and had been a Chelsea TV station presenter since the launch of the channel in August 2001. Some of the programmes she presented include Blues News and Matchnight Live and Paperview. Neil Barnett had been presenting also since the launch. He began working for The Blues in the 1980s writing articles for the club's magazine.

== Closure/Chelsea TV Online ==
On 30 June 2019, The channel closed and was later moved to an online only service. With the TV channel showing a on-screen message citing that the channel had ceased on Sky, with programmes available on the website, and the club's official app, The 5th Stand, later removed off Sky, 2 days later, on 2 July, with its SD channel having already been removed since the 4th of July 2017.

On the 1st of July, a day after the channel's closure, Chelsea TV Online launched as a new way to view Chelsea TV via a PC or Mac:

Chelsea TV Online is powered in collaboration with the club's internet partner Perform, with content from the Sky channel, Chelsea TV and includes exclusive interviews, live press conferences, Bridge Kids and many behind the scenes features, being moved exclusively to Chelsea TV, it has since been rebranded as CFC+, launching on the 29th June 2026.
