= Bob Hazell =

Footballer (born 1959)

Personal information
- Full name: Robert Joseph Hazell
- Date of birth: 14 June 1959 (age 67)
- Place of birth: Kingston, Jamaica
- Height: 6 ft 1 in (1.85 m)
- Position: Defender

Youth career
- Wolverhampton Wanderers

Senior career*
Years	Team	Apps	(Gls)
1977–1979	Wolverhampton Wanderers	33	(1)
1979–1983	Queens Park Rangers	106	(8)
1983–1986	Leicester City	41	(2)
1985	→ Wolverhampton Wanderers (loan)	1	(0)
1986	Reading	4	(1)
1986–1989	Port Vale	81	(1)
Total		266	(13)

International career
1977	England Youth	2	(1)
1979	England U21	1	(1)
1978	England B	1	(0)
- * Club domestic league appearances and goals

Robert Joseph Hazell (born 14 June 1959) is a former professional footballer who made 266 league appearances in a 12-year career in the English Football League between 1977 and 1989. Born in Jamaica, he represented England at under-21 level. His nephew is the former Oldham Athletic defender Reuben Hazell, and his son Rohan was a non-League player.

A big physical defender, he began his career at Wolverhampton Wanderers, featuring in the FA Youth Cup final in 1976. He moved on to Queens Park Rangers in 1979. He helped QPR to the Second Division title in 1982–83 and also played in the 1982 FA Cup final. He moved on to Leicester City in 1983 and had a brief spell back on loan at Wolves in 1985 before he signed with Reading. He joined Port Vale in December 1986 and was a regular for the "Valiants" until a back injury forced his retirement in June 1989.

== Club career ==
=== Wolverhampton Wanderers ===
Hazell was born in Kingston, Jamaica. He began his career at Wolverhampton Wanderers and featured in the 1976 FA Youth Cup final, which ended in a 5–0 aggregate defeat to West Bromwich Albion. He turned professional at Molineux under Sammy Chung and played 20 First Division games for Wolves in the 1977–78 season; despite only making his debut in December and being sent off in a 2–1 defeat to Arsenal in the FA Cup, he made such an impact in a central defensive partnership with John McAlle that he picked up the club's second ever Player of the Year award. Hazell scored his first career goal in a 1–0 home win over Manchester City. He played 13 games in the first half of the 1978–79 campaign. He played in a benefit match for West Bromwich Albion player Len Cantello, which saw a white team play against a black team.

=== Queens Park Rangers ===
In September 1979, Hazell was transferred to Queens Park Rangers for a £240,000 fee, who had just been relegated into the Second Division. Rangers finished fifth in 1979–80 under the stewardship of Tommy Docherty, two places and four points behind promoted Birmingham City. Following this disappointment, Terry Venables was put in charge at Loftus Road. The "Hoops" then dropped to eighth position in 1980–81, before rising to fifth again in 1981–82, just two points behind promoted Norwich City. Hazell played for QPR in the 1982 FA Cup final against Tottenham Hotspur at Wembley and provided the assist for Terry Fenwick to make the original tie a 1–1 draw. However, a Glenn Hoddle penalty was enough to hand "Spurs" a 1–0 victory in the replay. Perhaps his most impressive performance came in the semi-final against West Bromwich Albion, where he marked Cyrille Regis out of the game. Promotion was finally achieved in 1982–83, as Rangers won the Second Division title by a ten-point margin.

=== Leicester City to Reading ===
Hazell transferred to First Division rivals Leicester City in September of the 1983–84 campaign for a fee of £100,000. He helped Gordon Milne's "Foxes" to post a 15th-place finish in 1984–85, but became plagued by injury problems. He had a brief loan spell at old club Wolves in 1985–86, but could do little to prevent Sammy Chapman's side from slipping into the Fourth Division. He was released from Filbert Street and played for Leeds United in the Yorkshire Cup. He moved on to Second Division side Reading for the 1986–87 season. He made just four league appearances for Ian Branfoot's "Royals" before leaving Elm Park. Reading wanted him on a short-term contract to cover for Paul Futcher, who was out with a fractured jaw.

=== Port Vale ===
Hazell joined Port Vale in December 1986. He was reluctant to join due to the club's dire league placement but was talked round by former Leicester teammate Mark Grew. His signing proved to be another master-stroke by manager John Rudge. Along with defensive partner Phil Sproson, Hazell quickly shored up the "Valiants" defence before the end of season run-in to steer the club out of the Third Division relegation zone to a 12th-place finish. He went on to serve as club captain, setting an example with his performances whilst commanding respect with his mentality and presence. He was the first black player to captain the club. He played 52 league and cup games in 1987–88, and gained some measure of revenge over Tottenham Hotspur in the FA Cup as he helped Vale to snatch a memorable 2–1 win; it was reported that he successfully intimidated Clive Allen by knocking him to the ground and telling him that "You're going to get that for the next eighty-five minutes".

Hazell was a regular feature in the first XI until he received a back injury in January 1989. He made 17 league appearances in Vale's 1988–89 promotion season. However, injury meant he was unable to play in the play-off final victory over Bristol Rovers. Unable to overcome a back injury, he was given a free transfer in June 1989, having made 100 club appearances in all competitions at Vale Park. Chairman Bill Bell refused to pay up his contract as he wanted to try and sell Hazell on to another club, and so the Professional Footballers' Association (PFA) decided to pay the remainder of his contract rather than try and take the club to court over the issue.

== International career ==
During his time at Wolves he represented the England Youth, playing two games in March 1977. He scored for the under-21 team in a 2–1 victory over Denmark in February 1979. He also played for the B team in 1978.

== Style of play ==
"Big Bob was your typical 'throw back' defender who took no prisoners and would kill to prevent a goal. On the ball he had much more skill and ability than he was given credit for, but it was his physicality that scared opposing forwards to death. This monster of a man had a particularly light, soft-spoken voice. But I never heard anyone take the mickey out of him!"

— Robbie Earle writing in 2012.

== Post-retirement ==
After leaving the game, Hazell attempted a job selling life insurance but fell into a deep depression. He took up Transcendental Meditation and became a sports prevention manager in Birmingham, working to help rehabilitate young offenders through sport.

== Career statistics ==
Appearances and goals by club, season and competition
Club	Season	League			FA Cup		Other		Total	
Club	Season	Division	Apps	Goals	Apps	Goals	Apps	Goals	Apps	Goals
Wolverhampton Wanderers	1977–78	First Division	20	1	3	0	0	0	23	1
Wolverhampton Wanderers	1978–79	First Division	13	0	0	0	0	0	13	0
Wolverhampton Wanderers	Total		33	1	3	0	0	0	36	1
Queens Park Rangers	1979–80	Second Division	29	1	1	1	4	0	34	2
Queens Park Rangers	1980–81	Second Division	8	2	0	0	2	0	10	2
Queens Park Rangers	1981–82	Second Division	24	2	4	0	4	0	32	2
Queens Park Rangers	1982–83	Second Division	39	3	1	0	2	0	42	3
Queens Park Rangers	1983–84	First Division	6	0	0	0	0	0	6	0
Queens Park Rangers	Total		106	8	6	1	12	0	124	9
Leicester City	1983–84	First Division	27	2	1	0	2	0	30	2
Leicester City	1984–85	First Division	14	0	0	0	2	0	16	0
Leicester City	Total		41	2	1	0	4	0	46	2
Wolverhampton Wanderers (loan)	1985–86	Third Division	1	0	0	0	0	0	1	0
Reading	1986–87	Second Division	4	1	0	0	1	0	5	1
Port Vale	1986–87	Third Division	21	1	0	0	3	1	24	2
Port Vale	1987–88	Third Division	43	0	6	0	3	0	52	0
Port Vale	1988–89	Third Division	17	0	3	0	4	0	24	0
Port Vale	Total		81	1	9	0	10	1	100	2
Career total			266	13	19	1	27	1	312	15

== Honours ==
Wolverhampton Wanderers

- FA Youth Cup runner-up: 1976

Queens Park Rangers

- Football League Second Division: 1982–83
- FA Cup runner-up: 1981–82

Individual

- Wolverhampton Wanderers Player of the Year: 1977–78
