= Toronto Nationals (soccer) =

Canadian soccer team

- Full name: Toronto Nationals
- Founded: 1983
- Dissolved: 1983
- Stadium: Varsity Stadium
- Capacity: 20,500
- Owner: Klaus Dietsold
- Coach: Frank Pike
- League: Canadian Professional Soccer League

The Toronto Nationals were a Canadian professional soccer team in Toronto, Ontario that competed in the original Canadian Professional Soccer League in 1983. They folded mid-way through the season and were immediately replaced by a successor team known as simply Toronto, which also folded after one game, a week later.

== History ==
Their first match was played on May 21, which was the first game of the CPSL, in which they defeated FC Inter-Montréal by a score of 2–1 at Varsity Stadium, with a crowd of 3,860.

However, only five weeks into the season, on June 18, the team folded. The league announced that new owners would take over the club and form a new replacement franchise, known simply as Toronto on June 20.

On June 26, the reformed club faced the Hamilton Steelers, losing 3–2, but the new Toronto team folded immediately after this match, ending the franchise for good after new financial backers could not be found.

== Season ==
Season	Tier	League	Record	Rank	Playoffs	Ref
1983 (Note: Toronto Nationals folded prior to the conclusion of the season.)	1	Canadian Professional Soccer League	2–1–4	6th	–	

== Notable players ==
The following players played for the Nationals:

- (Canada) John Baretta
- (Canada) Frank Ciaccia
- (England) Tony Currie
- (England) Colin Franks
- (Canada) Kevin Grant
- (Canada) Jens Kraemer
- (Canada) Ed McNally
- (Germany) Hans-Günter Neues
- (Netherlands) Andre Oostrom
- (Socialist Federal Republic of Yugoslavia) Blagoje Tamindzic
