= 2009–10 Hong Kong Second Division League =

2009–10 Hong Kong Second Division League is the 96th season of a football league in Hong Kong, Hong Kong Second Division League.

== Changes from last season ==
=== From Second Division ===
Promoted to First Division

- Advance Tai Chung
- Shatin

Relegated to Third Division

- Kwok Keung

Quit Hong Kong football league system

- Tung Po

=== To Second Division ===
Relegated from First Division

- Mutual

Promoted from Third Division League

- Derico Friends
- Tuen Mun

=== Name changing ===
- Rangers renamed as Ongood
- Double Flower renamed as Advance Double Flower

== League table ==
Pos	Team	Pld	W	D	L	GF	GA	GD	Pts	Promotion or relegation
1	HKFC (C, P)	16	12	1	3	53	19	+34	37	Promotion to First Division League
2	Tuen Mun (P)	16	10	3	3	55	17	+38	33	Promotion to First Division League
3	Advance Double Flower	16	9	4	3	41	19	+22	31	
4	Ongood	16	10	1	5	49	31	+18	31	
5	Wing Yee	16	7	1	8	53	38	+15	25	
6	Kwai Tsing	16	6	4	6	36	23	+13	22	
7	Mutual	16	5	2	9	38	50	−12	17	
8	Fukien (R)	16	3	4	9	43	42	+1	13	Relegation to Third Division League
9	Derico Friends (R)	16	0	0	16	7	136	−129	0	Relegation to Third Division League

Updated to match(es) played on 24 April 2009. Source: The Hong Kong Football Association
(C) Champions; (P) Promoted; (R) Relegated

== Top scorers ==
Rank	Scorer	Club	Goals
1	Joe-joe Abah	Ongood / Tuen Mun	20
2	Yau Ping Kai	Wing Yee	19
3	Wu Man Chun	Shatin	16
4	Emmanuel John	Kwai Tsing / Ongood	13
5	Lawrence Akandu	Mutual / Tuen Mun	13
6	Chu Kwok Leung	Tuen Mun	12
7	Tai Siu Wing	Fukien	11
8	Yau Man Lung	Fukien	10
8	Jon Angelucci	HKFC	10
8	Chiemela Nnanna	Mutual	10

Only players scored ≥10 is shown.
