= Martin Duffield =

English footballer

Personal information
- Full name: Martin John Duffield
- Date of birth: 28 February 1964 (age 62)
- Place of birth: Park Royal, England
- Position: Midfielder

Youth career
- –1982: Queens Park Rangers

Senior career*
| Years | Team | Apps | (Gls) |
| 1982–1985 | Queens Park Rangers | 1 | (0) |
| 1983 | → AFC Bournemouth (loan) | 6 | (1) |
| 1984 | → Charlton Athletic (loan) | 1 | (0) |
| 1985–1988 | Enfield | 110 | (21) |
| 1988–1992 | Hendon | 111 | (15) |
| 1992–1995 | St Albans City | 113 | (34) |
| 1995–1997 | Hendon | 28 | (5) |
- Sutton United

International career
| 1982 | England U18 | 1 | (0) |
- * Club domestic league appearances and goals

Martin John Duffield (born 28 February 1964 in Park Royal, England), is an English footballer who played as a midfielder. He played in the Football League for Queens Park Rangers, AFC Bournemouth and Charlton Athletic.
