= Tommy Langley =

English footballer (born 1958)

Personal information
- Full name: Thomas William Langley
- Date of birth: 8 February 1958 (age 68)
- Place of birth: Elephant & Castle, London, England
- Height: 1.80 m (5 ft 11 in)
- Position: Striker

Youth career
- –1974: Chelsea

Senior career*
Years	Team	Apps	(Gls)
1974–1980	Chelsea	142	(40)
1980–1981	Queens Park Rangers	25	(8)
1981–1983	Crystal Palace	59	(8)
1983–1984	AEK Athens	5	(0)
1984	Coventry City	2	(0)
1984–1985	Wolverhampton Wanderers	23	(4)
1984–1985	Aldershot	16	(4)
1985–1986	South China	?	(?)
1986–1988	Aldershot	81	(21)
1988–1989	Exeter City	21	(2)
1989	Tampa Bay Rowdies	5	(1)
1989–1991	Slough Town	56	(19)
1991	Aylesbury United	2	(1)
1991	St Albans City	5	(1)
1992	Basingstoke Town		
1992	Staines Town		
1992–1993	Wokingham Town		
Total		442	(109)

International career
1973	England Schoolboys	8	(2)
1975–1976	England U18	8	(4)
1978	England U21	1	(0)
- * Club domestic league appearances and goals

Thomas William Langley (born 8 February 1958) is an English retired footballer who played in the 1970s and 1980s as a striker. He is currently one of the hosts of Matchnight Live on Chelsea TV.

== Club career ==
=== Chelsea ===
Langley began his career as an apprentice with Chelsea, making his debut in 1975 against Leicester City, when aged 16 years and 9 months. The club were relegated the same season and for the remainder of Langley's time there they bounced between the top two divisions. He first established himself in the side during Chelsea's first season back in the First Division in 1977–78, during which he scored 13 goals, making him the club's top scorer. The following year, Chelsea were near the bottom of the league all season and relegated by March, with Langley's 16 goals – more than three times the total managed by any of his teammates – a rare bright spot, for which he was voted club player of the year. During his career with Chelsea, he scored 43 goals in 152 games.

=== Queens Park Rangers ===
After Chelsea's failure to gain instant promotion in 1979–80, Langley joined Queens Park Rangers for £400,000 in August 1980. During his stint with QPR, he appeared in 25 games and scored 8 goals. including scoring against his old teammates on his debut, just two weeks after he switched from Chelsea and Scoring QPR's fastest league goal, after 12 seconds against Bolton on 11 October 1980.

=== Crystal Palace ===
Following his brief stay at QPR, Langley joined Crystal Palace in March 1981, for £200,000. where he played until 1983. During his time at Crystal Palace he appeared in 59 league games and scored 8 goals (71 and 10 in all competitions).

=== AEK Athens and Coventry City ===
On 14 July 1983 Langley left English football and was transferred to the Greek side, AEK Athens for a fee of 15 million drachmas. Langley only appeared in five matches for the Greek club and on 24 February 1984 his contract was terminated and returned to England to play for Coventry City. Langley appeared in two games for Coventry. During his seven combined appearances with the two sides during the 1983–84 season, he did not score any goals.

=== Wolverhampton Wanderers ===
After a somewhat disappointing 1983–84 season, Langley joined Wolverhampton Wanderers in 1984 where he scored four goals in 23 appearances. He finished the 1984–85 season at Aldershot Town where he scored another four goals in 16 games.

=== South China ===
After his stint with the Wanderers and Aldershot, Langley left Europe in 1985 to play for Hong Kong-based South China.

=== Aldershot F.C. ===
After spending a year in Asia, Langley returned to England and rejoined Aldershot in 1986. He spent two more years with the club appearing in 81 matches and scoring 21 goals.

=== Exeter City ===
Langley then went on to finish his English career with Exeter City where he appeared in 21 matches scoring two goals during the 1988–89 season with the club.

=== Tampa Bay Rowdies ===
He left Europe for the second time in 1989 this time going to the United States to play for the now defunct Tampa Bay Rowdies in the American Soccer League.

== International career ==
Langley won England Honours at Schoolboy, Under-21 and 'B' levels.

== After football ==
After Langley's playing days were over, he has still been a part of the game with a career in sport media. He took on his first presenting role as a commentator on Chelsea Radio in 1997. After the radio show, Langley went on to his role as Football Reporter on Channel 5's Breakfast News. Langley joined Chelsea TV when it launched, as a regular guest on the Live From Stamford Bridge phone-in show. He is currently one of the semi-regular presenters on the show, Matchnight Live. He is also used as a co-commentator for Chelsea TV and is known to celebrate when Chelsea score important goals live on air. One such noted time was in Chelsea's 4–4 draw with Tottenham Hotspur, when Chelsea got the goal that gave them a 4–3 lead with three minutes to go, Langley let out a loud "YES". But when Spurs got the equaliser in stoppage time, a loud "NO" could be heard.

Immediately after leaving football, he joined Nashua in Bracknell where he was in dealer sales for copiers and fax machines. His colleague was his ex Aldershot teammate, Graham Cox.
