= Calgary Mustangs (CPSL) =

Canadian soccer team

- Founded: 1983
- Dissolved: 1983
- Stadium: Mewata Stadium
- Capacity: 5,600
- Owner: Edgar Edringer
- Coach: Günter Noel
- League: Canadian Professional Soccer League

The Calgary Mustangs were a Canadian professional soccer team in Calgary, Alberta that competed in the original Canadian Professional Soccer League in 1983.

== History ==
After the original five CPSL clubs were announced, Calgary was later announced as the sixth franchise. After being turned down by a couple of local investors, the league was able to convince West German player agent Edgar Edringer to invest in a team and the team was officially unveiled on February 24, 1983. Edringer announced his intention to be heavily involved with the franchise, moving to the city and serving as the team's general manager as well. He was confident that the team would be successful, unlike the former NASL Calgary Boomers who operated for only one season in 1981 before folding due to losses of over $2 million despite setting an NASL attendance record of averaging over 11,000 fans, in part due to his knowledge of the sport. Edringer announced that the team would operate on a $650,000 budget ($350,000 for player salaries), which would limit losses due to the investment amount.

Their first match was played on May 23 on the road against Mississauga Croatia, which ended in a 1–1 draw. Their home opener came in their third game of the season, on May 29, also against Mississauga, which resulted in their first victory by a 4–0 score, in front of a crowd of 5,107 spectators at Mewata Stadium, in which they featured a starting lineup that contained nine young Canadian players.

After two of the six league clubs folded in mid-June, the decision was made to abandon the remainder of the regular season and proceed directly to the playoffs on July 12. As the Mustangs were the lowest ranked remaining team in the league, they matched up against the Edmonton Eagles in the first round. After losing the first match of the best-of-three series to Edmonton, head coach Günter Noel quit as Calgary's coach, one day ahead of the second match, as he had not been paid since mid-June. The Mustangs lost the second match and were thus eliminated from the playoffs.

The league folded following the single 1983 season, ending the tenure of the Mustangs.

Professional soccer eventually returned to Calgary in 1987 with the Calgary Kickers of the original Canadian Soccer League, who played for three seasons. Another team called the Calgary Mustangs later played in 2004, renamed from the Calgary Storm. In 2019, another team Cavalry FC began playing in the new Canadian Premier League.

== Season ==
| Season | Tier | League | Record | Rank | Playoffs | Ref |
|---|---|---|---|---|---|---|
| 1983 (Note: The 1983 CPSL regular season was cancelled partway through the season and playoffs began immediately after it) | 1 | Canadian Professional Soccer League | 2–4–6 | 5th | Semi-finals | |

== Notable players ==
The following players played for the Mustangs:

- (Canada) Bruce Bates
- (Germany) Holger Brück
- (Germany) Franz Hiller
- (Germany) Manfred Müller
