= Omniturf =

Brand of artificial turf

Omniturf is a brand of sand in-filled second-generation artificial turf. It was the first artificial surface to be used by an English Football League club.

== United Kingdom ==
The first club to install this 'plastic grass' surface was Queens Park Rangers who installed the new pitch for the start of the 1981/82 season. Despite much publicity around the supposed unfair advantage the pitch would provide Rangers, they proceeded to lose the opening home Division Two match on the new surface by 1–2 against Luton Town.

The pitch did prove to be successful for Rangers though, as they reached the FA Cup Final in the 1981/82 season (as a 2nd Division club), and then won the (old) 2nd Division Championship the following season.

The innovation at Loftus Road brought mixed results, for while the ball ran smoothly enough over the hard surface, it was unpredictable when allowed to bounce. This caused confusion among defenders and goalkeepers in particular.

The Omniturf pitch lasted at Rangers' Loftus Road ground for seven seasons; the pitch was torn up at the end of the 1987/88 season.

Other Football League clubs which also laid similar artificial surfaces during the 1980s were Luton Town (1985–1991), Oldham Athletic (1986–1991), and Preston North End (1986–1994).

== United States ==
For American football, Omniturf was installed several college football stadiums in the United States. Its first major venue was Autzen Stadium at the University of Oregon in Eugene in 1984. It had generally favorable results and installed a second field in 1991, which was used until 2000, when the stadium used Nexturf the next year; it switched again to the current FieldTurf in 2002. Martin Stadium at Washington State University in Pullman switched to Omniturf in 1990, and used it for a decade; like Autzen Stadium, it now uses FieldTurf.

The University of Missouri in Columbia had Omniturf at Faurot Field from 1985 through 1994, with less favorable reviews. In the early 1990s, the surface was panned by both Tigers and opponents alike as one of the worst in college football. In 1992, the coaches in the Big Eight Conference issued a statement that Faurot Field's surface was "a detriment to the home and visiting teams and takes away from the integrity of the game played on such a field." Missouri had a natural grass field prior to 1985, and returned to it in 1995. The stadium has since switched to a FieldTurf surface.

== Canada ==
The only major installation of OmniTurf in Canada was for the Canadian Football League's Saskatchewan Roughriders's stadium, Taylor Field in Regina. It was installed in 1988 and stayed until the end of the 1999 season.
