= Hans Kraay Sr. =

Dutch footballer (1936–2017)

Hans Kraay
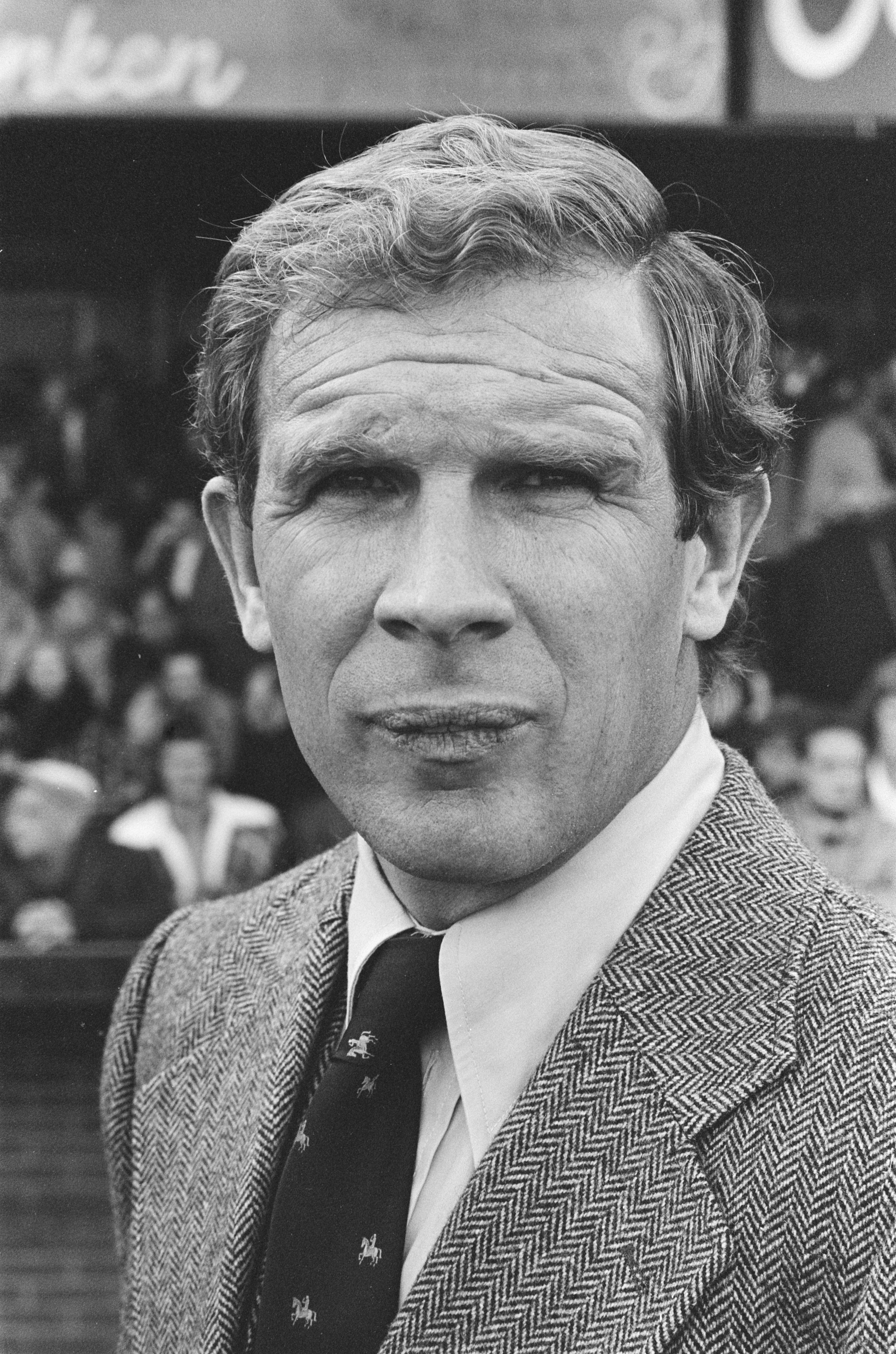
- Kraay in 1976

Personal information
- Full name: Johan Hendrik Kraay
- Date of birth: 14 October 1936
- Place of birth: Utrecht, Netherlands
- Date of death: 27 October 2017 (aged 81)
- Place of death: Tiel, Netherlands
- Position: Defender

Youth career
- DOS

Senior career*
Years	Team	Apps	(Gls)
1956–1961	DOS	155	(0)
1961–1968	Feyenoord	192	(2)
1968–1970	DOS	18	(0)

International career
1957–1964	Netherlands	8	(0)

Managerial career
- 1968–1969: DFC
- 1970–1973: Elinkwijk
- 1973–1974: Go Ahead Eagles
- 1974–1975: Ajax
- 1976–1979: AZ'67
- 1979–1980: Edmonton Drillers
- 1980: Sparta Rotterdam
- 1980–1981: Den Haag
- 1982–1983: Feyenoord
- 1985–1987: PSV Eindhoven (technical director)
- 1988–1989: Feyenoord (technical director)
- * Club domestic league appearances and goals

Johan Hendrik "Hans" Kraay (14 October 1936 – 27 October 2017) was a Dutch professional football player and manager who played as a defender. Subsequently, he became well known for his football management skills as well as analysis of matches on Dutch television.

Kraay was the first individual to manage all of Dutch football's "Big Three" teams (Ajax, Feyenoord and PSV), later followed by Ronald Koeman.

== Club career ==
Born in Utrecht, Kraay made his professional debut at DOS and also played for Feijenoord. He played 365 games in the Dutch Eredivisie, scoring two goals. He won three Eredivisie titles (one with DOS and two with Feijenoord) and one KNVB Cup (with Feijenoord).

== Managerial career ==
After his playing career, he became manager at DFC, Elinkwijk, Go Ahead Eagles, Ajax Amsterdam, AZ'67, Edmonton Drillers, Sparta Rotterdam (only two days due to some health issues), FC Den Haag and Feyenoord Rotterdam. He also served Feyenoord and PSV Eindhoven as a technical director, as well as the NOS and other television channels with his views on football, both commentary and analysis. In 1986, he took place at PSV Eindhoven as manager. The team was first in the League, but in March 1987, he was replaced by Guus Hiddink after a loss against FC Den Bosch on penalties for the KNVB Cup.

Kraay also worked for N.E.C. Nijmegen as head of scouting and personal adviser of chairman Marcel Boekhoorn.

== Personal life ==
Kraay's son Hans Jr. is also a retired professional footballer and television personality.

== Career statistics ==
=== International ===
Appearances and goals by national team and year
National team	Year	Apps	Goals
Netherlands	1957	1	0
Netherlands	1958	2	0
Netherlands	1959	2	0
Netherlands	1960	0	0
Netherlands	1961	0	0
Netherlands	1962	0	0
Netherlands	1963	0	0
Netherlands	1964	3	0
Total		8	0

== Honours ==
=== Player ===
DOS

- Eredivisie: 1957–58

Feijenoord

- Eredivisie: 1961-62, 1964-65
- KNVB Cup: 1964–65

=== Manager ===
AZ'67

- KNVB Cup: 1977-78

== See also ==
- Big Three (Netherlands)
