= Dean Neal =

English footballer

Personal information
- Full name: Dean John Neal
- Date of birth: 5 January 1961 (age 65)
- Place of birth: Edmonton, England
- Height: 5 ft 11 in (1.80 m)
- Position: Striker

Youth career
- 19xx–1979: Queens Park Rangers

Senior career*
Years	Team	Apps	(Gls)
1979–1981	Queens Park Rangers	22	(8)
1981	Tulsa Roughnecks	31	(12)
1981–1985	Millwall	120	(42)
1985–1988	Southend United	40	(6)
1988–19xx	Fisher Athletic	?	(?)
Total		213	(68)
- * Club domestic league appearances and goals

Dean John Neal (born 5 January 1961) is an English former professional footballer who played as a striker. Active in both England and the United States, Neal scored 68 goals in 213 league appearances over a nine-year professional career.

== Career ==
Born in Edmonton, London, Neal began his career at Queens Park Rangers, scoring 8 goals in 22 appearances in the Football League between 1979 and 1981. Neal then spent the 1981 season in the North American Soccer League with the Tulsa Roughnecks, before returning to England to play with Millwall, scoring 63 goals in 152 appearances in all competitions over the next four years. Neal won the Millwall Player of the Season award for 1982/83. Neal then moved to Southend United in 1985, scoring 6 goals in 40 appearances over the next three years.

Neal later played non-league football with Fisher Athletic.

== Honours ==
Millwall

- Football League Group Cup: 1982–83
