= David McCreery =

Northern Irish football player and manager (born 1957)

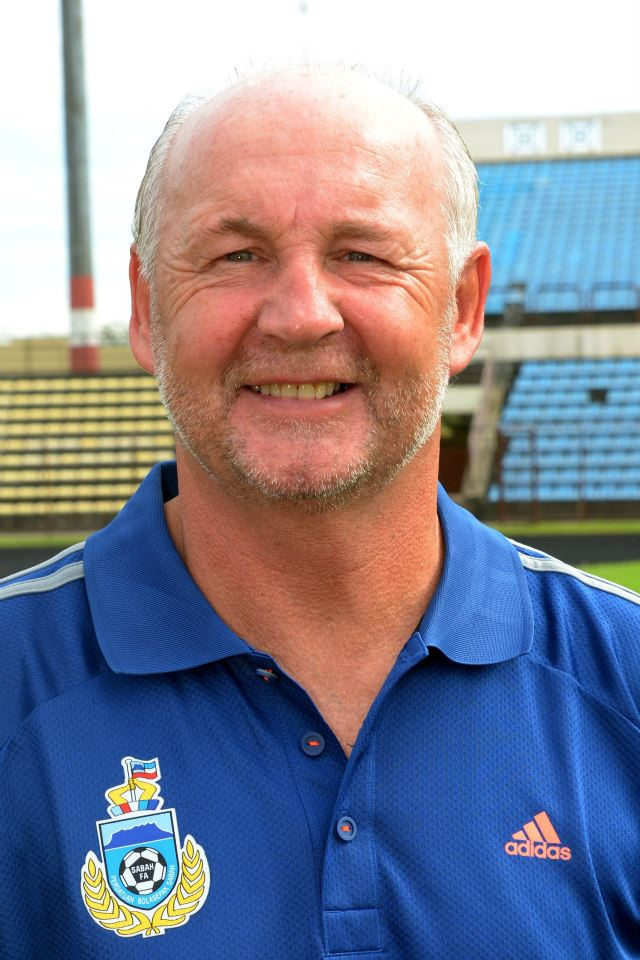
- McCreery of Sabah FA

Personal information
- Full name: David McCreery
- Date of birth: 16 September 1957 (age 69)
- Place of birth: Belfast, Northern Ireland
- Position: Midfielder

Youth career
- Manchester United

Senior career*
Years	Team	Apps	(Gls)
1974–1979	Manchester United	97	(7)
1979–1981	Queens Park Rangers	57	(4)
1981–1982	Tulsa Roughnecks	45	(0)
1981–1982	Tulsa Roughnecks (indoor)	16	(2)
1982–1989	Newcastle United	272	(2)
	GIF Sundsvall	5	(0)
1989–1991	Heart of Midlothian	44	(0)
1991–1992	Hartlepool United	30	(0)
1992	Coleraine	2	(0)
1992–1994	Carlisle United	39	(0)
1994–1995	Hartlepool United	9	(0)
Total		639	(19)

International career
1976–1990	Northern Ireland	67	(0)

Managerial career
- 1992–1994: Carlisle United
- 1994–1995: Hartlepool United
- 2010–2012: Magway
- 2012–2013: Sabah
- * Club domestic league appearances and goals

David McCreery (born 16 September 1957) is a Northern Irish former professional footballer who played for Manchester United, Newcastle United and many other clubs during his long career.

He mostly played in midfield, but was very versatile, and during his career played in every position bar goalkeeper. McCreery made 67 appearances for the Northern Ireland national football team, and played in the World Cup finals of 1982 and 1986. He was named in the All Star Select XI at the World Cup 1982 for his continuous high quality performances.

McCreery started his career with Manchester United, where he was a used substitute as they won the 1977 FA Cup and FA Charity Shield. After scoring eight goals for the club, he transferred to Queens Park Rangers for £200,000 in 1979. In 1981, he joined Tulsa Roughnecks of the North American Soccer League playing both the 1981 and 1982 summer seasons in the United States. He also played in the 1981–82 winter indoor league for Tulsa, netting two goals.

In 1982, he was transferred to Newcastle United where he gained promotion in the 1983–84 season, before shorter spells at Heart of Midlothian and Hartlepool United.

He would later manage Carlisle United and Hartlepool, in the English Division 2. His greatest success at these clubs came in 1993–94, when he guided Carlisle to a place in the Division Three playoffs, where they were eliminated in the semi-finals by eventual winners Wycombe Wanderers. He won Manager of the Month Award twice within his tenure at the club. He then joined Hartlepool United but was unable to win promotion and resigned after one season to initiate Major League Soccer in America. Within the MLS role, McCreery worked with Bruce Arena, Dave Sarachan and Rinus Michels, coaching and then selecting suitable players to raise the profile of the MLS in its inaugural season and beyond.

His knowledge of global soccer and networks led McCreery to join a United States–based soccer management company, then he became European Consultant for Boca Juniors and scouted for a number of Premier and Championship League clubs in England.

McCreery was named head coach of Myanmar National League club Magway FC in late 2010. Straight away, he established a strong youth development programme at the club, and this resulted in five squad players being called up to the Myanmar U22 squad. After two years in Burma, McCreery moved to Malaysia to take charge of the Sabah state team in the Malaysian Premier League. After leading the club to a Malaysia Cup playoff spot, he resigned from the role in July 2013.

== Honours ==
Manchester United

- FA Cup: 1976–77; runner-up: 1975–76
- FA Charity Shield: 1977
