= Hans Kraay Jr. =

Dutch footballer, coach, and television presenter

Hans Kraay
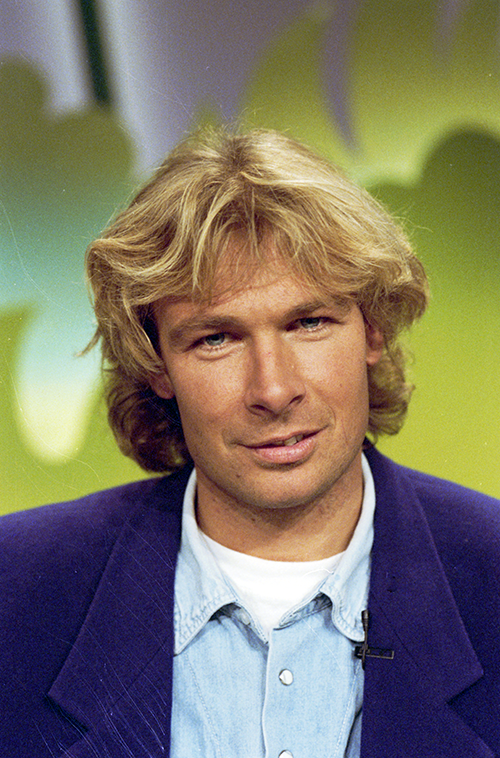
- Kraay in 1992

Personal information
- Full name: Hans Kraay Jr.
- Date of birth: 22 December 1959 (age 66)
- Place of birth: Utrecht, Netherlands
- Position: Defender

Senior career*
Years	Team	Apps	(Gls)
1977–1979	AZ	0	(0)
1979	Edmonton Drillers	30	(4)
1979–1981	Excelsior	36	(3)
1980	→ San Jose Earthquakes (loan)	8	(1)
1981–1982	Haarlem	2	(0)
1982–1983	NAC Breda	31	(6)
1983	Edmonton Eagles	?	(6)
1983–1985	Brighton & Hove Albion	23	(3)
1985–1986	RKC Waalwijk	17	(3)
1986–1988	Helmond Sport	44	(7)
1988–1991	Eindhoven	85	(5)
1991–1992	De Graafschap	45	(1)
1992–1993	Dordrecht	24	(1)
1993–1995	Telstar	34	(1)
1995–1996	Den Bosch	31	(2)
1996–1997	Sint-Niklase	6	(0)
Total		416+	(43)

Managerial career
- 1999–2004: SV Ophemert
- 2004–2011: FC Lienden
- 2011–2012: SVZW
- 2012–2014: JVC Cuijk
- 2014–2016: DOVO
- 2016–2018: FC Lienden
- * Club domestic league appearances and goals

Hans Kraay Jr. (born 22 December 1959) is a Dutch former professional footballer turned coach and television presenter.

== Biography ==
Kraay Jr. was born in Utrecht on 22 December 1959, the son of fellow footballer Hans Kraay Sr.

== Playing career ==
Kraay played professionally in the Netherlands for AZ, SBV Excelsior, HFC Haarlem, NAC Breda, RKC Waalwijk, Helmond Sport, FC Eindhoven, De Graafschap, FC Dordrecht, Telstar and FC Den Bosch, in the North American Soccer League for the Edmonton Drillers, Edmonton Eagles and the San Jose Earthquakes, in England for Brighton & Hove Albion, and in Belgium for Sint-Niklase.

== Coaching career ==
Kraay served as head coach of Dutch amateurs FC Lienden from 2004 to 2011, leading the club from Tweede Klasse to Topklasse and making it nationally known within Dutch football.

In November 2011 he was appointed head coach of Topklasse club SVZW. One month later, it was revealed his appointment head coach of JVC Cuijk, effective from July 2012. He left after two seasons in charge to become new head coach of Hoofdklasse club DOVO, effective from July 2014.

Kraay presented numerous television shows on Dutch television, most notably for SBS6, for which he worked from 1997 till 2015. Between 2002 and 2015 he was the presenter of Lachen om Home Video's, on SBS6, a compilation program of funny home videos. A part of the videos were taken from America's Funniest Home Videos. In 2003 he had a hit record in The Netherlands reaching #3 at the Dutch Top 40 with Er zal d'r altijd eentje winnen, a song recorded with fans of various Dutch football clubs as a reaction to the violent meeting at Beverwijk of hooligans of AFC Ajax and Feyenoord, leading to the death of one hooligan.

In April 2018, Kraay handed in his resignation at FC Lienden due to a discourtesy by supporters of the FC Lienden business club.
