= Mike Flanagan (footballer) =

English footballer and manager

Personal information
- Full name: Michael Flanagan
- Date of birth: 9 November 1952 (age 73)
- Place of birth: Ilford, Essex, England
- Height: 5 ft 9 in (1.75 m)
- Position: Forward

Youth career
- Tottenham Hotspur

Senior career*
Years	Team	Apps	(Gls)
1971–1979	Charlton Athletic	254	(85)
1978	→ New England Tea Men (loan)	28	(30)
1979–1980	Crystal Palace	56	(8)
1980–1983	Queens Park Rangers	78	(20)
1983–1986	Charlton Athletic	93	(24)
1986–1987	Cambridge United	9	(3)
Total		518	(170)

International career
1971	England Youth	3	(2)
1978–1979	England B	3	(1)

Managerial career
- 1993–1995: Gillingham
- 1999–2000: Waterford United
- 2011–2012: Maldon & Tiptree
- 2015–2016: Brentwood Town
- * Club domestic league appearances and goals

Michael Flanagan (born 9 November 1952) is an English former professional footballer and manager.

== Playing career ==
Flanagan made his debut for Charlton Athletic in the 1971–72 season and formed a successful partnership with Derek Hales, although the pair were once sent off in an FA Cup tie for fighting each other.

During the summer of 1978 Flanagan crossed the Atlantic and signed for the New England Tea Men of the NASL, and subsequently scored 30 goals in 28 league appearances. He also won the MVP award (Most Valuable Player) for the 1978 season, ahead of such players as the legendary Franz Beckenbauer.

In summer 1979 he joined Crystal Palace for £650,000 where he played 56 games scoring 8 goals. December 1980 saw him join Queens Park Rangers. He was capped three times by England 'B', scoring once against New Zealand. Whilst at QPR he played in the 1982 FA Cup Final. In January 1984 he returned to Charlton in a £50,000 deal.

== Managerial career ==
Flanagan managed Gillingham from 1993 until 1995. He also had a spell as manager of Waterford United. He later became assistant manager of Margate, a post he left in July 2007. He was caretaker manager at Maldon & Tiptree from November 2011 until May 2012, and managed Brentwood Town between 2015 and 2016, a club where his son Adam has previously been manager.

== Honours ==
Queens Park Rangers

- FA Cup runner-up: 1981–82
