= Steve Burke (footballer) =

English footballer (born 1960)

Personal information
- Full name: Steven James Burke
- Date of birth: 29 September 1960 (age 66)
- Place of birth: Nottingham, England
- Height: 5 ft 10 in (1.78 m)
- Position: Winger

Youth career
- Nottingham Forest

Senior career*
Years	Team	Apps	(Gls)
1978–1979	Nottingham Forest	0	(0)
1979–1986	Queens Park Rangers	67	(5)
1983	→ Millwall (loan)	7	(1)
1984	→ Notts County (loan)	5	(0)
1985	→ Lincoln City (loan)	5	(0)
1986	→ Brentford (loan)	10	(1)
1986–1988	Doncaster Rovers	57	(8)
1988	→ Stockport County (loan)	5	(0)
1988	Shepshed Charterhouse		
1988–1989	Grantham Town		
Total		156	(15)

International career
1977–1979	England Youth	12	(0)
- * Club domestic league appearances and goals

Steven James Burke (born 29 September 1960) is an English former footballer who played 156 games in the Football League. He played as a winger.

== Playing career ==
Burke was born in Nottingham, and came through the ranks at Nottingham Forest. His only first-team appearance was on 20 October 1976, while still a schoolboy aged 16 years 22 days, as a substitute in the Anglo-Scottish Cup against Ayr United. He moved on to Second Division club Queens Park Rangers in September 1979 for a fee of £125,000, and made his debut in the Football League on 7 September in a 3–0 win at home to Fulham. He played quite frequently at the beginning of his QPR career, and came on as substitute in the 1982 FA Cup Final replay, which QPR lost to Tottenham Hotspur. He had several loan spells towards the end of his QPR career – at Millwall from October to December 1983, at Notts County from October to December 1984, at Lincoln City from August to September 1985, and at Brentford from March to May 1986 – before leaving the club at the end of the 1985–86 season on a free transfer to Doncaster Rovers. He finished his League career with two seasons at Doncaster, including a loan spell at Stockport County. Burke's senior career finished in Non-League football, turning out for Shepshed Charterhouse and Grantham Town.

== Honours ==
Queens Park Rangers

- FA Cup runner-up: 1981–82
