= Tony Currie (footballer) =

English footballer (born 1950)

Personal information
- Full name: Anthony William Currie
- Date of birth: 1 January 1950 (age 76)
- Place of birth: Edgware, Middlesex, England
- Position: Midfielder

Youth career
- Queens Park Rangers
- Chelsea
- Watford

Senior career*
Years	Team	Apps	(Gls)
1967–1968	Watford	18	(9)
1968–1976	Sheffield United	313	(54)
1976–1979	Leeds United	124	(16)
1979–1982	Queens Park Rangers	81	(5)
1983	Toronto Nationals	6	(1)
1983–1984	Southend United	0	(0)
1984	Torquay United	14	(1)
Total		528	(80)

International career
1968	England Youth	3	(0)
1969–1973	England U23	13	(4)
1972–1979	England	17	(3)
- * Club domestic league appearances and goals

Anthony William Currie (born 1 January 1950) is an English former footballer who had significant spells for Sheffield United, Leeds United and Queens Park Rangers as well as representing England.

He was an effervescent and exuberant attacking midfield player with the vision and ability to strike long dangerous passes. His nephew, Darren Currie, was also a midfielder.

== Career ==
Currie was a talented schoolboy footballer who represented Hendon Boys before joining Queens Park Rangers as an amateur, whilst working for a building firm. He joined Chelsea as an apprentice, but was released and moved to Watford to complete his apprenticeship, earning England Youth honours in the process. He turned professional in May 1967 and made his league debut the following season.

He was transferred to Sheffield United on 1 February 1968 for £26,500. He scored on his debut against Tottenham Hotspur with a header on 26 February but missed the next game on 2 March as it was his wedding day. 'TC' or 'Top Cat' as he was nicknamed by Sheffield United fans, was idolised in his time at Bramall Lane. He went on to score 54 goals in 313 appearances and was also made captain by manager Ken Furphy in March 1974. In September 2014, as part of the club's 125th Anniversary celebrations, he was named Sheffield United's Greatest Ever Player

In June 1976 he moved to Yorkshire rivals Leeds United for £250,000, making his Leeds debut in a 2–2 draw with West Bromwich Albion. His skills made him a firm favourite at Leeds, where he played a total of 124 games, scoring 16 goals. His curling shot during United's November 1978 4–0 home win against Southampton F.C. won ITV's The Big Match Goal of the Season that year. Currie's form helped Leeds reach the League Cup semi–finals in 1978 and 1979, and in the 1978–79 season Leeds finished fifth to qualify for the UEFA Cup. As his wife was homesick for London this resulted in his sale to Queens Park Rangers in August 1979.

Currie captained Rangers in the 1982 FA Cup final replay, though he conceded the penalty from which Glenn Hoddle scored the winning goal. His career was badly affected by injuries and, after five goals in 81 games, he dropped out of league football and into semi-retirement from the game. He moved to Canada and spent two months playing for the Toronto Nationals, joining Chesham United on his return to Britain. He subsequently joined Southend United on non-contract terms before being persuaded by David Webb to join Torquay United in February 1984. He scored once in 16 games for the Gulls.

He moved to Tranmere Rovers in October 1984, but left without appearing in their first team, leaving him with 81 goals in 528 league games. He moved into non–league football, playing for Dunstable Town, Hendon and Goole Town before being appointed Football in the Community co-ordinator at Sheffield United in February 1988, a post he still holds today.

=== International career ===
During his time at Sheffield United, he broke into the England team, winning the first of his 17 caps in 1972. He was capped 11 times whilst at Leeds.

He played in the World Cup qualifier against Poland, which was held at Wembley Stadium in 1973. England dominated the match, but could only draw 1–1 and failed to qualify.

== Career statistics ==
=== Club ===
Appearances and goals by club, season and competition
Club	Season	League			National Cup		League Cup		Other		Total	
Club	Season	Division	Apps	Goals	Apps	Goals	Apps	Goals	Apps	Goals	Apps	Goals
Watford	1967–68	Third Division	18	9	2	0	1	0	—		21	9
Sheffield United	1967–68	First Division	13	4	0	0	0	0	2 (Note: Appearance(s) in Sheffield & Hallamshire County Cup)	0	15	4
Sheffield United	1968–69	Second Division	35	4	1	0	1	0	3	0	40	4
Sheffield United	1969–70	Second Division	42	12	2	0	2	0	2	0	48	12
Sheffield United	1970–71	Second Division	42	9	1	0	2	1	3 (Note: Two appearances two goals in Watney Cup; one appearance in Sheffield & Hallamshire County Cup)	2	48	12
Sheffield United	1971–72	First Division	38	10	1	0	5	1	—		44	11
Sheffield United	1972–73	First Division	39	1	2	0	5	1	6 (Note: Three appearances two goals in Watney Cup; two appearances one goal in Texaco Cup; one appearance in Sheffield & Hallamshire County Cup)	3	52	5
Sheffield United	1973–74	First Division	29	6	1	1	1	0	4 (Note: Two appearances in Texaco Cup; two appearances one goal in Sheffield & Hallamshire County Cup)	1	35	8
Sheffield United	1974–75	First Division	42	7	2	1	4	0	3 (Note: Appearance(s) in Texaco Cup)	2	51	10
Sheffield United	1975–76	First Division	33	1	1	0	2	0	7 (Note: Two appearances in Anglo-Scottish Cup; five appearances one goal in Sheffield & Hallamshire County Cup)	1	43	2
Sheffield United	Total		313	54	11	2	22	3	30	9	376	68
Leeds United	1976–77	First Division	35	1	5	0	1	1	—		41	2
Leeds United	1977–78	First Division	35	3	1	0	5	1	—		41	4
Leeds United	1978–79	First Division	32	7	3	0	7	3	—		42	10
Leeds United	Total		102	11	9	0	13	5	—		124	16
Queens Park Rangers	1979–80	Second Division	28	3	1	0	4	1	—		33	4
Queens Park Rangers	1980–81	Second Division	31	1	1	0	3	0	—		35	1
Queens Park Rangers	1981–82	Second Division	20	1	7	0	1	0	—		28	1
Queens Park Rangers	1982–83	Second Division	2	0	0	0	0	0	—		2	0
Queens Park Rangers	Total		81	5	9	0	8	1	—		98	6
Career total			514	79	31	2	44	9	30	9	619	99

== Honours ==
Queens Park Rangers

- FA Cup runner-up: 1981–82
