= Glenn Roeder =

English footballer and manager (1955–2021)

- Roeder in 2003

Personal information
- Full name: Glenn Victor Roeder
- Date of birth: 13 December 1955
- Place of birth: Woodford, Essex, England
- Date of death: 28 February 2021 (aged 65)
- Place of death: Newmarket, Suffolk, England
- Height: 6 ft 0 in (1.83 m)
- Position: Defender

Youth career
- 1969–1972: Arsenal
- 1972–1973: Orient

Senior career*
Years	Team	Apps	(Gls)
1973–1978	Orient	115	(4)
1978–1983	Queens Park Rangers	157	(17)
1983	→ Notts County (loan)	4	(0)
1983–1989	Newcastle United	193	(8)
1989–1992	Watford	78	(2)
1992	Leyton Orient	8	(0)
1992–1993	Gillingham	6	(0)
Total		561	(31)

International career
1978–1979	England B	6	(0)

Managerial career
- 1992–1993: Gillingham (player-manager)
- 1993–1996: Watford
- 2001–2003: West Ham United
- 2006–2007: Newcastle United
- 2007–2009: Norwich City
- 2016–2018: Stevenage (managerial advisor)
- * Club domestic league appearances and goals

Glenn Victor Roeder (13 December 1955 – 28 February 2021) was an English professional football player and manager.

As a player, Roeder played as a defender for Arsenal, Leyton Orient, Queens Park Rangers, Notts County, Newcastle United, Watford and Gillingham. He also represented the England national B team.

His managerial career included spells with numerous clubs including Gillingham, Watford, West Ham United, Newcastle United (with whom he won the 2006 UEFA Intertoto Cup) and Norwich City. It was while he was at West Ham United that he was initially diagnosed with a brain tumour in 2003. He later acted as a managerial advisor for Stevenage.

== Playing career ==
Roeder was born in Woodford, Essex, on 13 December 1955 and played for Gidea Park Rangers and Essex and London schools, joining Arsenal as a schoolboy in December 1969 and then Orient in August 1972 after being released by Arsenal. He made his name as a classy ball-playing defender who was a member of the Orient playing squad in the Second Division during the 1970s that reached the FA Cup semi-final in 1978. He transferred to Queens Park Rangers for £250,000 in August 1978 where he made 181 senior appearances and captained the team to the 1982 FA Cup Final against Tottenham, missing the replay due to suspension, and to the Second Division title in 1983.

Roeder was one of the first players famed for using the step over -the Roeder shuffle- a technique Roeder claimed, his father taught him as a child.

Roeder had a brief loan spell at Notts County. Roeder transferred to Newcastle United for £125,000 in December 1983, where he was captain and made 219 senior appearances during five years at the club, winning promotion from the Second Division in 1984. He joined Watford on a free transfer in July 1989, making 78 senior appearances in two years, and later returned to the renamed Leyton Orient, playing eight games in 1992, before a six-game stint to finish his playing career at Gillingham, whom he had joined as player-manager in November 1992.

== Managerial and coaching career ==
=== Gillingham ===
Roeder spent one season as player-manager of Gillingham, during which time he led the side to 10 wins in 37 games and saw them finish second from bottom of the Football League, escaping relegation after winning against bottom club Halifax Town in the penultimate fixture of the season. He resigned in July 1993 to take over at Watford.

=== Watford ===
After Steve Perryman left to join Tottenham Hotspur, Roeder was hired as the new manager of his former club Watford at the start of the 1993–94 season. However, Watford were fined £10,000 for an illegal approach, and ordered to pay Gillingham a further £30,000 in compensation. In his second season with Watford he almost took the side to the play-offs, eventually finishing just two places outside them. However, he was sacked in February 1996 as the side were struggling at the bottom of the First Division. His replacement, Graham Taylor, was unable to prevent the side from being relegated. During his time at Vicarage Road he signed Kevin Phillips from local Hertfordshire team, Baldock Town for only £10,000.

=== Burnley ===
Roeder followed his tenure at Watford by taking a season away from the limelight, assuming a back seat role as Chris Waddle's assistant manager at Burnley. The partnership did not prove to be successful and the pair narrowly avoided steering Burnley into the bottom tier of English football. Only a home victory over Plymouth Argyle on the last day staved off relegation. Roeder proved to be both an unpopular and controversial figure to the Burnley fans, hitting a low point when he was reported to have said that star player Glen Little was "not fit to lace the boots" of manager Chris Waddle. Roeder left his role at Burnley alongside Waddle when the pair departed the club after only a single season in charge.

=== England ===
Roeder then worked as a coach under Glenn Hoddle for the England national team, before West Ham manager Harry Redknapp offered him an opportunity in club football again in 1999.

=== West Ham United ===
West Ham manager Harry Redknapp initially appointed Roeder as a coach and scout at the club in 1999. However, at the end of the 2000/2001 season, Redknapp left the club following a dispute over transfer funds, and the Hammers failed in their attempts to attract Steve McClaren and then Alan Curbishley. Roeder was unexpectedly appointed manager. The appointment was opposed by some supporters, who had expected a bigger name to replace Redknapp. Roeder received a £15 million transfer kitty, and guided West Ham to seventh in his first season in charge. He signed David James from Aston Villa, Tomáš Řepka from Fiorentina for £5.5 million, and Don Hutchison from Sunderland for £5 million, a club record fee at the time, and made permanent the transfer of Sebastien Schemmel, who had impressed on loan the previous season. The club started the season poorly. James was injured on international duty before he could make an appearance for the club, and Repka was sent off twice in the first five games of the season. However the club recovered to finish in seventh position in Roeder's first season in charge, with Jermain Defoe making an immediate impact up front with Frederic Kanoute, and Schemmel going on to win the Hammer of the Year award.

The 2002–03 season started off similarly poorly as West Ham struggled with injuries to their forwards and midfielders leaving them with Defoe as their main, and often the only fully fit, forward. West Ham had spent no money over the summer, their only significant permanent signing being free agent Gary Breen who had impressed at the 2002 World Cup for Ireland. West Ham were bottom at Christmas with only three wins and six draws. At that time, no team had ever avoided relegation from that position. The board made limited funds available after Christmas, and the January signings of Rufus Brevett, Les Ferdinand and loan of Lee Bowyer on a short-term deal helped to improve the club's form, winning four and drawing three of their next 10 games. Roeder had a dispute with striker Paolo Di Canio after he substituted Di Canio in a match against West Bromwich Albion due to injury. Di Canio subsequently missed all but two of the remaining games of the season.

In April 2003, Roeder collapsed due to a brain tumour and was replaced by Trevor Brooking for the final three games of the season. Despite the late rally that saw West Ham win seven, draw four and lose three, they were relegated with a record total of 42 points, two points behind a Bolton Wanderers team they had lost to with four games to go.

Roeder returned to work in July 2003, stating he had "unfinished business". In the 2003 close season, many of West Ham's star players, such as Trevor Sinclair, Frédéric Kanouté and Joe Cole left the club as a result of relegation. Cole refused the offer of a new contract and moved to Chelsea. Roeder was sacked by West Ham in August 2003, following a defeat to Rotherham United. He had managed only three league games of the new season with West Ham now playing in the second tier. The season started with a 2–1 away win against Preston North End. However, after a goalless draw at home against Sheffield United on 16 August 2003, the team were booed from the pitch. He was again replaced by Trevor Brooking as manager.

=== Newcastle United ===
After nearly two years out of the game, Roeder returned to football in June 2005 when he was named youth-development manager of Newcastle United. After Graeme Souness was sacked as Newcastle manager in February 2006, Roeder was appointed as caretaker manager, with striker Alan Shearer, then still also a player, as his assistant. He was able to turn the Magpies' season around, rescuing them from near the foot of the table to finish seventh in the Premier League with a place in the Intertoto Cup. Freddy Shepherd, Newcastle United's chairman, consequently named Roeder as first in line to become full-time manager at the club, on condition that Newcastle obtain dispensation from the FA Premier League to allow Roeder to continue without the mandatory UEFA Pro Licence. Newcastle claimed exceptional circumstances, as Roeder had been halfway to gaining the licence when he suffered his brain tumour. The Premier League at first rejected Newcastle's request on 3 May 2006 in accordance with UEFA rules, which would not allow Roeder to take the position. However, Shepherd obtained the backing of all 19 other Premier League club chairmen, and they voted in favour of Roeder being allowed to gain the correct licence while in the job. Roeder was named as Newcastle's permanent manager on 16 May, signing a two-year contract with the club.

On 1 June 2006, Roeder appointed Kevin Bond as his assistant. Roeder had worked with Bond at West Ham, where Bond was a scout. Roeder believed the two of them would work well together, but Bond's contract at the club was terminated after allegations he was prepared to take bungs for players whilst at Portsmouth. On 22 October 2006, Roeder announced that ex-Middlesbrough player and recent care-taker manager of West Brom, Nigel Pearson, would be his new assistant manager.

Under Roeder, Newcastle won the 2006 Intertoto Cup by virtue of being the furthest placed team to advance from the Intertoto Cup into the UEFA Cup. This made Roeder the first manager to win a trophy for Newcastle since 1969. After the 1–0 defeat to Sheffield United at home on 4 November 2006, there was a fan protest outside St. James' Park, which was shown live on Sky Sports channel PremPlus. However, much of the fans' criticism was directed at Shepherd, and not at the manager himself. Newcastle's league form remained inconsistent, due in large part to first-team player injuries and having to rely on inexperienced players from Newcastle's youth academy to compete at top flight level. The club maintained a mid-table position. After guiding Newcastle to just one win in ten games, Roeder was summoned to an emergency board meeting on 6 May 2007; following this, he resigned with immediate effect.

Roeder won 45% of his matches, enough in a single season to qualify for European competition. Sam Allardyce, who had resigned from Bolton Wanderers just weeks before, was named as his replacement on 15 May 2007.

=== Norwich City ===
In October 2007, Roeder joined Championship side Norwich City, signing a contract until 2010, with Norwich bottom of the division and four points adrift of safety. His first game in charge was on 4 November in the East Anglian derby against Ipswich Town, a match that ended 2–2. His first win came in the home game against Coventry City (24 November), which he followed up with a first away win of the season for Norwich in the 3–1 defeat of Blackpool (27 November), who previously had not lost at home that season. He then guided the team out of the relegation zone with a series of wins. Roeder began an overhaul of the squad in the January transfer window, releasing players such as Julien Brellier and David Střihavka. He made the loan signing of Matty Pattison permanent and also renewed the loan deals for Ched Evans and Mo Camara. Roeder also made four further loan signings including Matthew Bates, Keiran Gibbs, Alex Pearce and James Henry. Despite a poor run of form through February and March, Roeder kept Norwich in the Championship for another season, though survival was not confirmed until a 3–0 home win against QPR in the penultimate fixture of the season.

On 25 July 2008, Roeder was fined £1,000 and given a suspended two-match touchline ban at a FA disciplinary hearing after criticising referee Andy D'Urso following a 2–1 defeat to Bristol City at Ashton Gate on 29 March. Both Roeder and assistant Lee Clark reacted angrily to Bristol City being awarded a 91st minute free kick, from which they scored the winner. Clark was given a one-match touchline ban and fined £500 for his part in the incident. They were both warned by The FA about their future conduct.

In May 2008, a few days after the last game of the season, Roeder decided not to renew Darren Huckerby's contract, which angered many supporters as they were unable to give him a proper sendoff. Roeder brought in a number of loan players in the summer. Norwich made a difficult start to the 2008–09 season, although there were some good results, including a 5–2 win against top of the table Wolves in October. After that result, however, Norwich entered a poor run of form. A 2–0 win against local rivals Ipswich in the East Anglian Derby at the start of December helped to briefly relieve the pressure on Roeder; however, after this, Norwich won one further league game under his management against bottom of the league Charlton at Carrow Road in December. January began with a draw away at Charlton in the FA cup and a loss to Sheffield United. When the team lost the FA Cup third round replay 1–0 at Carrow Road against Charlton, who had not won in 18 games, Roeder was sacked the following day.

=== Sheffield Wednesday advisor ===
In April 2015, he joined Sheffield Wednesday, together with Adam Pearson, to work alongside Stuart Gray. The arrangement was terminated in December 2015.

=== Stevenage managerial advisor ===
In March 2016, Roeder was appointed a managerial advisor at Stevenage to Darren Sarll. He left Stevenage on 18 March 2018 after Sarll was sacked, with the club 16th in EFL League Two.

== Death ==
Roeder died on 28 February 2021, aged 65, in Newmarket, Suffolk, due to the brain tumour that had been diagnosed 18 years previously.

== Managerial statistics ==
Team	From	To	Record				
Team	From	To	P	W	D	L	Win %
Gillingham	1 August 1992	9 July 1993	51	13	16	22	25.49
Watford	1 August 1993	20 February 1996	139	44	40	55	31.65
West Ham United	9 May 2001	24 August 2003	86	27	23	36	31.39
Newcastle United	2 February 2006	6 May 2007	72	33	15	24	45.83
Norwich City	30 October 2007	14 January 2009	65	20	30	15	30.77

== Honours ==
=== Manager ===
Newcastle United

- UEFA Intertoto Cup: 2006

Individual

- Premier League Manager of the Month: March 2003

== Sources ==
Books

- Simpson, Paul (2013). Who Invented the Stepover?. Profile Books. ISBN 9781847658425.
