= Ernie Howe =

English footballer and manager

Personal information
- Full name: Ernest James Howe
- Date of birth: 15 February 1953 (age 73)
- Place of birth: Chiswick, England
- Position: Defender

Senior career*
Years	Team	Apps	(Gls)
1973–1977	Fulham	70	(10)
1977–1982	Queens Park Rangers	89	(3)
1982–1984	Portsmouth	35	(4)
Total		194	(17)

Managerial career
- 1993–2006: Basingstoke Town
- 2007–2008: Sutton United
- * Club domestic league appearances and goals

Ernie Howe is an English football manager and former player who is no longer managing a team after he mutually parted company with Sutton United on 30 March 2008, having failed to pull them out of the Conference South relegation zone. He was Basingstoke Town's manager for 13 years until 2006, winning the Hampshire Senior Cup and promotion during his tenure.

A defender in his playing career, Howe turned out for Fulham alongside the likes of George Best and Rodney Marsh. He was a member of the Fulham squad beaten 2–0 by West Ham United in the 1975 FA Cup Final but did not make the team. He was subsequently transferred to Queens Park Rangers and then Portsmouth. Although not known for his goal scoring Howe scored on his Pompey debut at home to Sheffield United in August 1982. He helped Portsmouth win the Division Three championship that season. The following season before leaving Pompey he also scored in his final home game.

After leaving Portsmouth he was appointed coach at Wokingham Town.

He married the sister of fellow footballer Andy McCulloch, whose father Adam McCulloch had also played.

== Honours ==
Portsmouth

- Football League Third Division: 1982–83
