= Canadian Professional Soccer League (1983) =

- Founded: 1983
- Folded: 1983
- Commissioner: John Bailey
- No. of teams: 6
- Country: Canada
- Confederation: CONCACAF
- Most titles: Edmonton Eagles (1)
- Level on pyramid: 1

The original Canadian Professional Soccer League (CPSL) was a Division 1 professional soccer league that operated in Canada in 1983. It was a nationwide league that had six franchises in three provinces. It lasted for just one abridged, 73-day, summer season in 1983.

== Teams ==
The Canadian Professional Soccer League showcased 6 teams in its single season.

| Team | City | Stadium |
|---|---|---|
| Calgary Mustangs | Calgary, Alberta | Mewata Stadium |
| Edmonton Eagles | Edmonton, Alberta | Clarke Stadium |
| Hamilton Steelers | Hamilton, Ontario | Ivor Wynne Stadium |
| FC Inter-Montréal | Montreal, Quebec | Jarry Park Stadium |
| Mississauga Croatia | Mississauga, Ontario/Etobicoke, Ontario | Centennial Park Stadium |
| Toronto Nationals | Toronto, Ontario | Varsity Stadium |

== History ==
=== Formation ===
On 9 December 1981, the Canadian Soccer Association announced that it would be sanctioning a new professional Division 1 league known, as the Canadian Professional Soccer League, which would be the country's first ever coast-to-coast professional soccer league. The league was to be represented by Sports Professional International Inc. with the goal of the league having twenty franchises across the country, with the majority of players and management being Canadians. Previous leagues in Canada had been attempted such as the Eastern Canada Professional Soccer League from 1961 to 1966, while the semi-professional National Soccer League operated from 1927 to 1982, and five Canadian teams played in the US-based North American Soccer League.

To enter the league, prospective owners would need to pay a performance bond of $50,000, which was a drastically cheaper fee compared to the NASL. In an effort to avoid similar financial struggles that plagued teams in the NASL (including the Calgary Boomers and Edmonton Drillers who folded in 1981 and 1982, respectively and the Montreal Manic who lost $3 million in each of those two years), league commissioner John Bailey announced that teams would work on smaller budgets (presumably around $500,000) to curb potential losses. Each club would be limited to rosters of 16 players, featuring a maximum of 5 international players and would follow FIFA-rules, unlike the NASL which had introduced some Americanized rules. A number of individuals declared their interest in forming a team, including an owner in Victoria, although this franchise did not end up forming.

On 7 December 1982, commissioner Bailey announced the first five franchises locations and owners that would take part - Montreal, Toronto, Mississauga, Hamilton, and Kitchener. The plan was for the league to operate its first season from June to October 1983, with two divisions (a 7-team Central Division with two franchises in Toronto and London pending and a 5-team Western Division). However, these plans were unsuccessful with the league officially launching on 8 February 1983 with five teams – FC Inter-Montréal, Toronto Nationals, Mississauga Croatia, Hamilton Steelers, and the Edmonton Eagles (with the Kitchener group having dropped out). A sixth franchise was later added (Calgary Mustangs), to be operated by German player agent Edgar Edringer. One day prior to the original team launch announcement, the owner of the NASL Montreal Manic had announced his intention to turn his club into Team Canada, which created concerns for the league about the competition for Canadian players, meanwhile Canadian Soccer Association support for the new CPSL had seemingly evaporated with their focus moving towards the Manic Team Canada project.

=== Season ===
The 1983 season began with six teams to play a 25 game schedule. The league's opening match occurred on 21 May 1983 with the Toronto Nationals defeating the visiting FC Inter-Montréal at Varsity Stadium by a score of 2-1, in front of 3,680 spectators.

In June, Montreal owner Bob Laker, organized a four-team tournament featuring Montreal and high-profile European clubs – French club Marseille and Italian clubs Udinese and Avellino with Montreal winning the tournament. Udinese also played exhibition matches with Mississauga and Hamilton.

However, a month into the season, on 18 June, the Toronto Nationals folded, but the league announced that they would be replaced by a new ownership group on 20 June. However, on 26 June, this new ownership group folded as well after only one match, while the Montreal group folded on the same day as well, due to heavy financial losses. After the Montreal and Toronto franchises failed to get new financial backers, the four remaining clubs decided to cancel the remainder of the regular season on 12 July and to proceed directly to the playoffs, with a best-of-three semi-final followed by a one-match winner-take-all championship final on 1 August 1983.

In the semi-finals, the Edmonton Eagles defeated the Calgary Mustangs two games to zero, while the Hamilton Steelers defeated Mississauga Croatia two games to one to advance to the championship final. In the Championship match, the Eagles defeated the Steelers 2-0 to claim the Championship and were awarded the Tip Top Cup (which was sponsored by Canadian retail chain Tip Top Tailors). The very next day, the league officially folded.

=== Legacy ===
Competing with the established North American Soccer League, the CPSL failed to attract significant crowds or the attention of the media. Throughout its short tenure, its teams were plagued by financial instability, highlighted by low attendances, owner bail-outs, player walkouts, and wage disputes, ultimately resulting in two clubs folding and the early conclusion of its season and ultimate folding after a single season.

Eventually a new D1 Canadian professional league, the Canadian Soccer League, was formed in 1987, which was a bit more successful, lasting six seasons.

== 1983 season ==
Canadian Professional Soccer League
- Season: 1983
- Dates: May 21 – August 1
- Champions: Edmonton Eagles
- Regular season leaders: Edmonton Eagles
- Top goalscorer: Ross Ongaro & Hans Kraay Jr. (6 goals)

=== Regular season ===
| Pos | Team | Pld | W | D | L | GF | GA | GD | Pts | Qualification |
|---|---|---|---|---|---|---|---|---|---|---|
| 1 | Edmonton Eagles (O) | 10 | 7 | 3 | 0 | 24 | 6 | +18 | 17 | Advance to Playoffs |
| 2 | Hamilton Steelers | 12 | 4 | 4 | 4 | 22 | 20 | +2 | 12 | Advance to Playoffs |
| 3 | FC Inter-Montréal | 8 | 5 | 1 | 2 | 15 | 8 | +7 | 11 | Folded mid-season |
| 4 | Mississauga Croatia SC | 13 | 4 | 1 | 8 | 16 | 31 | −15 | 9 | Advance to Playoffs |
| 5 | Calgary Mustangs | 12 | 2 | 4 | 6 | 13 | 21 | −8 | 8 | Advance to Playoffs |
| 6 | Toronto Nationals | 7 | 2 | 1 | 4 | 11 | 15 | −4 | 5 | Folded mid-season |

Source: RSSSF
(O) Play-off winners

=== Playoffs ===
Semi-finals best of 3 series
1 | Edmonton Eagles | 2 | 2 | – | 2
5 | Calgary Mustangs | 1 | 1 | – | 0
2 | Hamilton Steelers | 2 | 4 | 2 | 2
4 | Mississauga Croatia SC | 3 | 1 | 0 | 1

Final single match
1 | Edmonton Eagles | 2
2 | Hamilton Steelers | 0

==== Semifinal ====
| July 13, 1983 | Mississauga Croatia | 3–2 | Hamilton Steelers | Etobicoke, Ontario |
| | Nick Dosen 8'; Frank Fiddler 18'; Peter Stipancik 49' | [ Report] | Marco Abascal 14'; Fred Ferrera 89' | Stadium: Centennial Park Stadium |

| July 15, 1983 | Hamilton Steelers | 4–1 | Mississauga Croatia | Hamilton, Ontario |
| | Rennie Phillips; Hidelberto Ponte; Carlos Salguero; Jimmy Sinclair | [ Report] | Peter Stipancik 49' | Stadium: Ivor Wynne Stadium |

| July 25, 1983 | Hamilton Steelers | 2–0 | Mississauga Croatia | Hamilton, Ontario |
| | Goal | [ Report] | | Stadium: Ivor Wynne Stadium; Attendance: 1000 |

Hamilton Steelers won 2–1 on best-of-three.

| July 17, 1983 | Edmonton Eagles | 2–1 | Calgary Mustangs | Edmonton, Alberta |
| | Hans Granander 10'; Ross Ongaro 81' | [ Report] | Dean Kelly 3' | Stadium: Clarke Stadium; Attendance: 1533 |

| July 20, 1983 | Calgary Mustangs | 1–2 | Edmonton Eagles | Calgary, Alberta |
| | Dean Kelly 70' | [ Report] | John Connor 38', 75' | Stadium: Mewata Stadium; Attendance: 1049; Referee: Phil Clarke |

Edmonton Eagles won 2–0 on best-of-three.

==== Final ====
| August 1, 1983 | Edmonton Eagles | 2–0 | Hamilton Steelers | Edmonton, Alberta |
| | John Connor 40'; Carlos Rivas 89' | [ Report] | | Stadium: Clarke Stadium; Attendance: 6300; Referee: Derek Douglas |

=== Awards ===
| Award | Player | Team |
|---|---|---|
| Most Valuable Player | (Socialist Federal Republic of Yugoslavia) Dubravko Ledić | Edmonton Eagles |
| Rookie of the Year | (Canada) Randy Samuel | Edmonton Eagles |
| Canadian of the Year | (Canada) Randy Samuel | Edmonton Eagles |
| Top Scorer | (Netherlands) Hans Kraay Jr. (Note: Kraay scored 6 goals in the regular season.) (Canada) Ross Ongaro (Note: Ongaro scored 5 goals in the regular season goals and 1 goal in the playoffs.) | Edmonton Eagles; Edmonton Eagles |

== See also ==
- Canadian Soccer League (1987–1992) – the next Canadian D1 league that operated from 1987 to 1992
- 1987 Canadian Soccer League season – next season of D1 soccer in Canada from the above league
- Canadian Professional Soccer League – an unsanctioned semi-professional soccer league of the same name (now currently known as the Canadian Soccer League) but unrelated to this league
- Canadian Premier League – the current Canadian D1 league that began play in 2019

| Preceded by Inaugural | Division 1 soccer league in Canada; 1983 | Succeeded by Canadian Soccer League (1987–1992) |
