= 1984–85 Leicester City F.C. season =

1984–85 season of Leicester City

Leicester City
1984–85 season
- Chairman: Terry Shipman
- Manager: Gordon Milne
- First Division: 15th
- FA Cup: Fourth round
- League Cup: Third round
- Top goalscorer: Lineker (28)
Home colours	Away colours

During the 1984–85 English football season, Leicester City F.C. competed in the Football League First Division.

== Squad ==
Note: Flags indicate national team as defined under FIFA eligibility rules; some limited exceptions apply. Players may hold more than one non-FIFA nationality.

Pos.	Nation	Player
GK	ENG	Mark Wallington
GK	ENG	Mark Grew
GK	ENG	Ian Andrews
DF	ENG	Larry May
DF	NIR	John O'Neill
DF	SCO	David Rennie
DF	SCO	Tommy Williams
DF	ENG	Bob Hazell
DF	ENG	Andy Feeley
DF	SCO	Bobby Smith
MF	NIR	Paul Ramsey
MF	SCO	Kevin MacDonald

Pos.	Nation	Player
MF	ENG	Ian Banks
MF	ENG	Steve Lynex
MF	SCO	Ian Wilson
MF	ENG	Andy Peake
MF	ENG	Rob Kelly
FW	ENG	Gary Lineker
FW	ENG	Alan Smith
FW	ENG	Robbie Jones
FW	ENG	Tommy English
FW	ENG	Peter Eastoe
FW	ENG	Mark Bright

== Competitions ==
=== Division One ===
==== League table ====
Pos	Team	Pld	W	D	L	GF	GA	GD	Pts
13	Luton Town	42	15	9	18	57	61	−4	54
14	Newcastle United	42	13	13	16	55	70	−15	52
15	Leicester City	42	15	6	21	65	73	−8	51
16	West Ham United	42	13	12	17	51	68	−17	51
17	Ipswich Town	42	13	11	18	46	57	−11	50

Source: World Football
Rules for classification: 1) Points; 2) Goal difference; 3) Goals scored

==== Results by round ====
Round	1	2	3	4	5	6	7	8	9	10	11	12	13	14	15	16	17	18	19	20	21	22	23	24	25	26	27	28	29	30	31	32	33	34	35	36	37	38	39	40	41	42
Ground	H	A	A	H	H	A	H	A	A	H	A	H	A	H	H	A	H	A	H	H	A	A	H	H	H	H	A	H	A	A	H	A	A	H	A	H	A	A	H	A	H	A
Result	L	D	L	D	W	D	W	L	L	L	L	W	L	L	W	L	W	W	D	W	W	L	L	D	D	L	W	W	L	W	W	L	L	L	L	L	W	L	W	L	W	L
Position	16	16	21	21	15	16	14	16	18	20	20	18	20	21	20	19	17	17	15	14	12	14	15	15	15	16	15	13	15	11	10	11	11	11	13	14	12	12	12	15	11	15

Source: https://www.11v11.com/teams/leicester-city/tab/matches/season/1985/
A = Away; H = Home; W = Win; D = Draw; L = Loss; = Champions, Qualified to 1985–86 European Cup; = Qualified to 1985–86 UEFA Cup; = Relegated to Division Two

On 2 June 1985 English teams were banned by UEFA from its competitions from the season 1985–86 on until the season 1990–91 because of the Heysel Disaster in 1985, involving Liverpool fans.

==== Matches ====
25 August 1984 1	Leicester City	2–3	Newcastle United	Leicester
	Lineker 39'; Lineker 74'	16	3'Carney; 52'McCreery; 80' Waddle	Stadium: Filbert Street

27 August 1984 2	Tottenham Hotspur	2–2	Leicester City	Tottenham
	Roberts 35'; Roberts 59' (pen.)	16	19' Alan Smith; 79' Ian Banks	Stadium: White Hart Lane; Attendance: 30,046

01 September 1984 3	Coventry City	0–2	Leicester City	Coventry
		21		Stadium: Highfield Road

05 September 1984 4	Leicester City	1–1	Watford	Leicester
	Gary Lineker 85'	21	56' Taylor	Stadium: Filbert Street; Attendance: 12,055

08 September 1984 5	Leicester City	2–1	Ipswich Town	Leicester
	Lineker 49'; Lynex 89'	15	73' Gates	Stadium: Filbert Street; Attendance: 10,737

15 September 1984 6	Stoke City	2–2	Leicester City	Stoke-on-Trent
	Hemming 67'; Bould 68'	16	54' Lineker; 75' (pen.) Lynex	Stadium: Victoria Ground; Attendance: 11,579

22 September 1984 7	Leicester City	2–1	West Bromwich Albion	Leicester
	Lynex 46'; Lynex 76' (pen.)	14	60' Cross	Stadium: Filbert Street; Attendance: 11,960

29 September 1984 8	Chelsea	3–0	Leicester City	Fulham
15:00	Kerry Dixon 13'; Kerry Dixon 58'; Pat Nevin 60'	16		Stadium: Stamford Bridge; Referee: Leslie Burden

06 October 1984 9	West Ham United	3–1	Leicester City	Upton Park
	Stewart 68' (pen.); Bonds 75'; Cottee 90'	18	28' Lynex	Stadium: Boleyn Ground; Attendance: 15,306

13 October 1984 10	Leicester City	1–4	Arsenal	Leicester
	Viv Anderson 1' (o.g.)	20	13' Talbot; 24' Rix; 75' Anderson; 85' Talbot	Stadium: Filbert Street; Attendance: 19,944

20 October 1984 11	Sheffield Wednesday	5–0	Leicester City	Sheffield
	Varadi 5'; Varadi 26'; Varadi 59'; Blair 76'; Ryan 84'	20		Stadium: Hillsborough; Attendance: 23,621

27 October 1984 12	Leicester City	5–0	Aston Villa	Leicester
	0' (pen.) Lynex; Lineker; Lineker; Lineker; Eastoe	18		Stadium: Filbert Street

03 November 1984 13	Everton	3–0	Leicester City	Walton
	Steven 55'; Sheedy 59'; Heath 80'	20		Stadium: Goodison Park; Attendance: 27,784

10 November 1984 14	Leicester City	2–3	Manchester United	Leicester
	Banks 35'; Lineker 82 '	21	26' Brazil; 60' Hughes; 88' (pen.) Strachan	Stadium: Filbert Street; Attendance: 23,840

17 November 1984 15	Leicester City	2–0	Norwich City	Leicester
	Banks 13'; Lynex 88' (pen.)	20		Stadium: Filbert Street; Attendance: 9,693

25 November 1984 16	Nottingham Forest	1–2	Leicester City	West Bridgford
	Banks	19	Goal	Stadium: City Ground

01 December 1984 17	Leicester City	4–0	Queens Park Rangers	Leicester
	Lineker 11'; Alan Smith 15'; Lynex 46'; Banks 58'	17		Stadium: Filbert Street; Attendance: 10,218

08 December 1984 18	Sunderland	4–0	Leicester City	Sunderland
	Alan Smith 16'; Lineker 38'; Alan Smith 42' Lynex 71'	17		Stadium: Roker Park; Attendance: 16,441

15 December 1984 19	Leicester City	2–2	Luton Town	Leicester
	Lynex 51'; Alan Smith 56'	15	36' Stein; 89' Harford	Stadium: Filbert Street; Attendance: 10,476

23 December 1984 20	Leicester City	5–1	Coventry City	Leicester
	Lynex 0' (pen.); Rennie; Lineker; Lineker; Alan Smith	14	Goal	Stadium: Filbert Street

26 December 1984 21	Liverpool	1–2	Leicester City	Liverpool
	Neal 60' (pen.)	12	11' Alan Smith; 35' Lineker	Stadium: Anfield; Attendance: 38,419

29 December 1984 22	Watford	4–1	Leicester City	Watford
	Barnes 35'; Reilly 57'; Terry 61'; Sterling 85'	14	14' O'Neill	Stadium: Vicarage Road; Attendance: 19,491

01 January 1985 23	Leicester City	1–2	Southampton	Leicester
	Banks 34 '	15	19'Armstrong; 74'Wallace	Stadium: Filbert Street; Attendance: 15,257

12 January 1985 24	Leicester City	0–0	Stoke City	Leicester
		15		Stadium: Filbert Street

02 February 1985 25	Leicester City	1–1	Chelsea	Leicester
	Lineker 4'	15	45' (pen.) Speedie	Stadium: Filbert Street; Attendance: 15,657; Referee: Trevor Simpson

23 February 1985 26	Leicester City	1–2	Everton	Leicester
	Lynex 81'	16	66'Gray; 82 'Gray	Stadium: Filbert Street; Attendance: 17,345

02 March 1985 27	Aston Villa	1–0	Leicester City	Birmingham
		15	48' Alan Smith	Stadium: Villa Park; Attendance: 16,285

09 March 1985 28	Leicester City	3–1	Sheffield Wednesday	Leicester
	Lineker 72'; O’Neill 82'; Smith 87'	13	43' Varadi	Stadium: Filbert Street; Attendance: 14,037

16 March 1985 29	Arsenal	0–2	Leicester City	Islington
	Williams 27'; Meade 87'	15		Stadium: Highbury; Attendance: 20,663

20 March 1985 30	Newcastle United	4–1	Leicester City	Newcastle-upon-Tyne
	Banks; Banks; Lineker; Smith	11	Goal	Stadium: St. James' Park

23 March 1985 31	Leicester City	1–0	West Ham United	Leicester
	Lineker	10		Stadium: Filbert Street

30 March 1985 32	West Bromwich Albion	2–0	Leicester City	West Bromwich
	Hunt 57'; Hunt 76'	11		Stadium: The Hawthorns; Attendance: 9,346

03 April 1985 33	Manchester United	1–2	Leicester City	Greater Manchester
		11	Lineker	Stadium: Old Trafford

06 April 1985 34	Leicester City	0–1	Liverpool	Leicester
		11		Stadium: Filbert Street

09 April 1985 35	Southampton	1–3	Leicester City	Southampton
		13	0' (pen Lynex)	Stadium: The Dell

13 April 1985 36	Leicester City	1–2	Tottenham Hotspur	Leicester
	Peake 80'	14	53' Hoddle; 89' Falco	Stadium: Filbert Street; Attendance: 15,609

20 April 1985 37	Norwich City	3–1	Leicester City	Norwich
	Smith 44'; Smith 89'; Banks 74'	12	10' Donowa	Stadium: Carrow Road; Attendance: 13,395

23 April 1985 38	Ipswich Town	0–2	Leicester City	Ipswich
		12		Stadium: Portman Road

27 April 1985 39	Leicester City	1–0	Nottingham Forest	Leicester
	Lineker 32'	12		Stadium: Filbert Street; Attendance: 13,886

04 May 1985 40	Queens Park Rangers	4–3	Leicester City	White City
	Gregory 2'; Bannister 30'; Robinson 52'; Fillery 83'	15	44' Lineker; 55' Wilson; 80' Lineker	Stadium: Loftus Road; Attendance: 9,071

06 May 1985 41	Leicester City	2–0	Sunderland	Leicester
	Lineker 14'; Lineker 21'	11		Stadium: Filbert Street; Attendance: 11,455

11 May 1985 42	Luton Town	4–0	Leicester City	Luton
	Nwajiobi 14'; Preece 28'; Stein 54'; Harford 86'	15		Stadium: Kenilworth Road; Attendance: 11,802

=== League Cup ===
==== Second Round ====
26 September 1984 1nb	Leicester City	4–2	Brentford	Leicester
	O'Neill; Lynex; Banks; Gary Lineker		Goal	Stadium: Filbert Street

09 October 1984 2	Brentford	0–2	Leicester City
			Ramsey; Alan Smith

==== Third Round ====
30 October 1984	Luton Town	3–1	Leicester City	Luton
	Goal	-	Lineker	Stadium: Kenilworth Road

=== FA Cup ===
==== Third Round ====
05 January 1985	Burton Albion	1–6	Leicester City
	Goal	-	Lynex; Lineker; Lineker; Lineker; Smith; Smith
Note: Match annulled due to riots.

16 January 1985 replay	Burton Albion	0–1	Leicester City	(N)
		-	Lineker
Note: Match played in closed doors with zero attendance.

==== Fourth Round ====
26 January 1985	Leicester City	1–0	Carlisle United	Leicester
	Alan Smith	-		Stadium: Filbert Street

==== Fifth Round ====
19 February 1985	Millwall	2–0	Leicester City
		-

== Statistics ==
=== Squad statistics ===
No.	Pos	Nat	Player	Total		Football League Division One		Football League Cup		FA Cup	
No.	Pos	Nat	Player	Apps	Goals	Apps	Goals	Apps	Goals	Apps	Goals
-	GK	(England) ENG	Ian Andrews	36	0	31	0	1	0	4	0
-	DF	(England) ENG	Andy Feeley	41	0	35	0	2	0	4	0
-	DF	(Northern Ireland) NIR	John O'Neill	49	3	42	2	3	1	4	0
-	DF	(Scotland) SCO	Tommy Williams	32	0	27	0	1	0	4	0
-	DF	(Scotland) SCO	Bobby Smith	36	0	30	0	2	0	4	0
-	MF	(England) ENG	Steve Lynex	49	15	42	13	3	1	4	1
-	MF	(Northern Ireland) NIR	Paul Ramsey	46	2	38+1	0	3	1	4	1
-	MF	(Scotland) SCO	Ian Wilson	45	1	38+1	1	2	0	4	0
-	MF	(England) ENG	Ian Banks	37	10	29+2	9	1+1	1	4	0
-	FW	(England) ENG	Gary Lineker	48	29	41	24	3	2	4	3
-	FW	(England) ENG	Alan Smith	45	16	36+3	12	2	1	4	3
-	GK	(England) ENG	Mark Wallington	13	0	11	0	2	0		
-	MF	(England) ENG	Andy Peake	23	1	21	1	2	0		
-	DF	(England) ENG	Bob Hazell	16	0	14	0	2	0		
-	MF	(Scotland) SCO	Kevin MacDonald	15	0	13	0	2	0		
-	FW	(England) ENG	Peter Eastoe	6	1	6	1				
-	DF	(Scotland) SCO	David Rennie	3	1	3	1				
-	FW	(England) ENG	Mark Bright	18	0	2+14	0	1+1	0		
-	FW	(England) ENG	Robbie Jones	3	0	2	0	1	0		
-	GK	(England) ENG	Mark Grew								
-	DF	(England) ENG	Larry May								
-	MF	(England) ENG	Rob Kelly								
-	FW	(England) ENG	Tommy English								

- Source: http://www.11v11.com/teams/leicester-city/tab/players/season/1984
