= 1983–84 Leicester City F.C. season =

1983–84 season of Leicester City

Leicester City
1983–84 season
- Chairman: Terry Shipman
- Manager: Gordon Milne
- First Division: 15th
- FA Cup: Third round
- League Cup: Second round
- Top goalscorer: Lineker (22)
- Average home league attendance: 14,923
Home colours	Away colours

During the 1983–84 English football season, Leicester City F.C. competed in the Football League First Division.

== Season summary ==
In the 1983–84 season, Leicester had a poor start with six successive league defeats which represented the Foxes' worst start to a season and labelled them as early relegation favourites. After going out of the League Cup though, their form picked up with only 2 defeats in their next 15 league games from the end of October until the end of January. Their relegation worries were formally avoided when Leicester beat Nottingham Forest 2-1 at Filbert Street on 5 May with 2 games to spare and the Foxes finished the season in a fairly comfortable 15th place.

== Final league table ==
Pos	Team	Pld	W	D	L	GF	GA	GD	Pts
13	Sunderland	42	13	13	16	42	53	−11	52
14	Norwich City	42	12	15	15	48	49	−1	51
15	Leicester City	42	13	12	17	65	68	−3	51
16	Luton Town	42	14	9	19	53	66	−13	51
17	West Bromwich Albion	42	14	9	19	48	62	−14	51

Source: World Football
Rules for classification: 1) Points; 2) Goal difference; 3) Goals scored

== Results ==
Leicester City's score comes first

=== Legend ===
Win	Draw	Loss

27 August 1983 1	Leicester City	0–4	Notts County	Leicester
				Stadium: Filbert Street; Attendance: 14,838

31 August 1983 2	Leicester City	0–3	Luton Town	Leicester
				Stadium: Filbert Street; Attendance: 11,929

3 September 1983 3	West Bromwich Albion	1–0	Leicester City	West Bromwich
				Stadium: The Hawthorns; Attendance: 12,016

6 September 1983 4	West Ham United	3–1	Leicester City	Upton Park
			Lineker	Stadium: Boleyn Ground; Attendance: 22,131

10 September 1983 5	Leicester City	0–3	Tottenham Hotspur	Leicester
				Stadium: Filbert Street; Attendance: 15,886

17 September 1983 6	Coventry City	2–1	Leicester City	Coventry
			Lineker	Stadium: Highfield Road; Attendance: 12,377

24 September 1983 7	Leicester City	2–2	Stoke City	Leicester
	Jones, Lineker			Stadium: Filbert Street; Attendance: 10,215

1 October 1983 8	Birmingham City	2–1	Leicester City	Birmingham
			Lineker	Attendance: 15,212

19 October 1983 9	Norwich City	3–1	Leicester City	Norwich
			Eastoe	Stadium: Carrow Road; Attendance: 13,780

22 October 1983 10	Ipswich Town	0–0	Leicester City	Ipswich Town
				Stadium: Portman Road; Attendance: 14,944

29 October 1983 11	Leicester City	2–0	Everton	Leicester
	A Smith, Ramsey			Stadium: Filbert Street; Attendance: 10,953

5 November 1983 12	Watford	3–3	Leicester City	Watford
			Lynex (2, 1 pen), Banks	Stadium: Craven Cottage; Attendance: 15,807

12 November 1983 13	Leicester City	1–1	Manchester United	Leicester
	Lynex			Stadium: Filbert Street; Attendance: 24,409

19 November 1983 14	Aston Villa	3–1	Leicester City	Birmingham
			Lynex (pen)	Stadium: Villa Park; Attendance: 19,024

26 November 1983 15	Leicester City	3–0	Arsenal	Leicester
	Lineker, Lynex, A Smith			Stadium: Filbert Street; Attendance: 14,777

30 November 1983 16	Leicester City	2–1	Southampton	Leicester
	A Smith, Lineker			Stadium: Filbert Street; Attendance: 14,181

4 December 1983 17	Nottingham Forest	3–2	Leicester City	Nottingham
			Jones, A Smith	Stadium: City Ground; Attendance: 23,248

10 December 1983 18	Leicester City	5–1	Wolverhampton Wanderers	Leicester
	Lineker, A Smith (3), Lynex			Stadium: Filbert Street; Attendance: 10,969

18 December 1983 19	Sunderland	1–1	Leicester City	Sunderland
			Hazell	Stadium: Roker Park; Attendance: 16,993

26 December 1983 20	Leicester City	2–1	Queens Park Rangers	Leicester
	Lineker, Lynex			Stadium: Filbert Street; Attendance: 17,460

27 December 1983 21	Liverpool	2–2	Leicester City	Liverpool
			A Smith, Banks	Stadium: Anfield; Attendance: 33,664

31 December 1983 22	Leicester City	1–1	West Bromwich Albion	Leicester
	Lynex (pen)			Stadium: Filbert Street; Attendance: 15,128

2 January 1984 23	Stoke City	0–1	Leicester City	Stoke-on-Trent
			A Smith	Attendance: 13,728

14 January 1984 24	Notts County	2–5	Leicester City	Nottingham
			MacDonald, Lineker (3), Peake	Attendance: 10,607

21 January 1984 25	Leicester City	1–1	Coventry City	Leicester
	Lineker			Stadium: Filbert Street; Attendance: 16,262

4 February 1984 26	Leicester City	2–3	Birmingham City
	A Smith (2)

11 February 1984 27	Tottenham Hotspur	3–2	Leicester City	Tottenham
			Lineker (2)	Stadium: White Hart Lane; Attendance: 28,410

25 February 1984 28	Leicester City	2–0	Ipswich Town	Leicester
	A Smith, O'Neill			Stadium: Filbert Street; Attendance: 11,399

3 March 1984 29	Leicester City	4–1	Watford	Leicester
	Peake (2), Lineker, A Smith			Stadium: Filbert Street; Attendance: 13,295

10 March 1984 30	Manchester United	2–0	Leicester City	Greater Manchester
				Stadium: Old Trafford; Attendance: 39,473

17 March 1984 31	Leicester City	4–1	West Ham United	Leicester
	Hazell, Lynex (2, 1 pen), Lineker			Stadium: Filbert Street; Attendance: 13,533

20 March 1984 32	Everton	1–1	Leicester City	Walton
			Lineker	Stadium: Goodison Park; Attendance: 15,142

24 March 1984 33	Luton Town	0–0	Leicester City	Luton
				Attendance: 10,509

31 March 1984 34	Leicester City	2–1	Norwich City	Leicester
	A Smith (2)			Stadium: Filbert Street; Attendance: 11,278

7 April 1984 35	Southampton	2–2	Leicester City	Southampton
			Lineker (2)	Stadium: The Dell; Attendance: 17,455

14 April 1984 36	Leicester City	2–0	Aston Villa	Leicester
	O'Neill, Banks			Stadium: Filbert Street; Attendance: 13,366

18 April 1984 37	Leicester City	3–3	Liverpool	Leicester
				Stadium: Filbert Street; Attendance: 26,553

21 April 1984 38	Queens Park Rangers	2–0	Leicester City	Shepherd's Bush
				Stadium: Loftus Road; Attendance: 12,360

28 April 1984 39	Arsenal	2–1	Leicester City	Islington
			Lineker	Stadium: Highbury; Attendance: 24,143

5 May 1984 40	Leicester City	2–1	Nottingham Forest	Leicester
	Lynex, Lineker			Stadium: Filbert Street; Attendance: 16,600

7 May 1984 41	Wolverhampton Wanderers	1–0	Leicester City
				Attendance: 7,405

12 May 1984 42	Leicester City	0–2	Sunderland	Leicester
				Stadium: Filbert Street; Attendance: 12,627

=== FA Cup ===
Round	Date	Opponent	Venue	Result	Attendance	Goalscorers
R3	7 January 1984	Crystal Palace	A	0–1	11,497	

=== League Cup ===
Round	Date	Opponent	Venue	Result	Attendance	Goalscorers
R2 1st leg	5 October 1983	Chelsea	H	0–2	7,798	
R2 2nd leg	25 October 1983	Chelsea	A	2–0 (lost 3-4 on pens)	15,666	A Smith, English

== Squad ==
Note: Flags indicate national team as defined under FIFA eligibility rules; some limited exceptions apply. Players may hold more than one non-FIFA nationality.

Pos.	Nation	Player
GK	ENG	Mark Wallington
MF	NIR	Paul Ramsey
DF	SCO	Bobby Smith
MF	SCO	Kevin MacDonald
MF	ENG	Ian Banks
DF	ENG	Larry May
DF	NIR	John O'Neill
MF	ENG	Steve Lynex
FW	ENG	Gary Lineker
FW	ENG	Alan Smith
FW	ENG	Robbie Jones

Pos.	Nation	Player
MF	SCO	Ian Wilson
MF	ENG	Andy Peake
DF	SCO	David Rennie
FW	ENG	Tommy English
GK	ENG	Mark Grew
DF	SCO	Tommy Williams
DF	ENG	Bob Hazell
FW	ENG	Peter Eastoe (on loan from West Brom)
DF	ENG	Andy Feeley
GK	ENG	Ian Andrews
MF	ENG	Rob Kelly
