= 1985–86 Leicester City F.C. season =

Leicester City FC season

Leicester City
1985–86 season
- Chairman: Terry Shipman
- Manager: Gordon Milne
- First Division: 19th
- FA Cup: Third round
- League Cup: Second round
- Top goalscorer: Smith (19)
- Average home league attendance: 11,792

During the 1985–86 English football season, Leicester City F.C. competed in the Football League First Division, their third consecutive season at this level since promotion. A 19th-place finish in the final table was just enough to secure a fourth successive top flight campaign.

== Season summary ==
In the summer of 1985, the transfer market was dominated by one deal with Gary Lineker's contract at Filbert Street expiring at the end of the last season: Lineker joined Everton in June for a club record sale of £800,000. Leicester started the 1985–86 season terribly with just 2 wins in their first 14 league games. Their only real highlight of the season was when the Foxes did the double over champions Everton and on the final day of the season, Leicester beat Newcastle United 2–0 at Filbert Street and with Ipswich Town losing at Sheffield Wednesday, it kept the Foxes in the top flight and sent Ipswich down.

== Final league table ==
Pos	Team	Pld	W	D	L	GF	GA	GD	Pts	Qualification or relegation
17	Coventry City	42	11	10	21	48	71	−23	43	
18	Oxford United (Note: Oxford United would have qualified as League Cup winners.)	42	10	12	20	62	80	−18	42	Disqualified from the UEFA Cup
19	Leicester City	42	10	12	20	54	76	−22	42	
20	Ipswich Town (R)	42	11	8	23	32	55	−23	41	Relegation to the Second Division
21	Birmingham City (R)	42	8	5	29	30	73	−43	29	Relegation to the Second Division

Source: World Football
Rules for classification: 1) Points; 2) Goal difference; 3) Goals scored
(R) Relegated

== Squad ==
Note: Flags indicate national team as defined under FIFA eligibility rules; some limited exceptions apply. Players may hold more than one non-FIFA nationality.

Pos.	Nation	Player
GK	ENG	Ian Andrews
MF	NIR	Paul Ramsey
DF	SCO	Bobby Smith
MF	ENG	Rob Kelly
DF	ENG	Russell Osman
DF	NIR	John O'Neill
MF	ENG	Steve Lynex
FW	ENG	Mark Bright
FW	ENG	Alan Smith
MF	SCO	Ian Wilson
MF	ENG	Ian Banks
MF	SCO	Ally Mauchlen

Pos.	Nation	Player
DF	SCO	Tommy Williams
FW	ENG	Robert Jones
DF	ENG	Andy Feeley
FW	ENG	Tony Sealy
DF	SCO	David Rennie
MF	SCO	Gary McAllister
DF	ENG	Simon Morgan
GK	ENG	Jerry Roberts
FW	DEN	Tommy Christensen
MF	ENG	Laurie Cunningham
DF	ENG	Mark Venus
MF	ENG	Paul Reid

== Transfers ==
=== In ===
Date	Pos	Name	From	Fee	Notes
15 August 1985	MF	Gary McAllister	Motherwell	£125,000	
15 August 1985	DF	Ally Mauchlen	Motherwell	£125,000	

=== Out ===
Date	Pos	Name	From	Fee	Notes
5 July 1985	FW	Gary Lineker	Everton	£800,000	
17 January 1986	DF	David Rennie	Leeds United	£50,000	

Transfers in: ▼£250,000
Transfers out: ▲£850,000
Total spending: ▲£600,000
