= 1986–87 Leicester City F.C. season =

1986–87 season of Leicester City

Leicester City
1986–87 season
- Chairman: Terry Shipman
- Manager: Bryan Hamilton
- First Division: 20th (relegated)
- FA Cup: Third round
- League Cup: Third round
- Top goalscorer: League: Alan Smith (17); All: Smith (20)
- Average home league attendance: 11,697

During the 1986–87 English football season, Leicester City F.C. competed in the Football League First Division.

== Season summary ==
In 1986–87 season, former Wigan Athletic boss Bryan Hamilton replaced Gordon Milne as team manager of the Foxes but it proved to be another season of struggle and in March, Alan Smith was sold to Arsenal for £800,000 even though he was loaned back to Leicester until the end of the season and Steve Lynex was sold to West Brom leaving Leicester’s strike force a bit weakened. Leicester brought in youngsters and loan-spell trialists but they did little to prevent the Foxes from relegation to the Second Division after 4 years in the top flight.

== Final league table ==
Pos	Team	Pld	W	D	L	GF	GA	GD	Pts	Qualification or relegation
18	Oxford United	42	11	13	18	44	69	−25	46	
19	Charlton Athletic (O)	42	11	11	20	45	55	−10	44	Qualification for the Second Division play-offs
20	Leicester City (R)	42	11	9	22	54	76	−22	42	Relegation to the Second Division
21	Manchester City (R)	42	8	15	19	36	57	−21	39	Relegation to the Second Division
22	Aston Villa (R)	42	8	12	22	45	79	−34	36	Relegation to the Second Division

Source: World Football
Rules for classification: 1) Points; 2) Goal difference; 3) Goals scored
(O) Play-off winners; (R) Relegated

== Results ==
Leicester City's score comes first

=== Legend ===
Win	Draw	Loss

=== Football League First Division ===
Date	Opponent	Venue	Result	Attendance	Scorers
23 August 1986	Luton Town	H	1–1	9,801	Smith
30 August 1986	Wimbledon	A	0–1	5,987	
3 September 1986	Liverpool	H	2–1	16,344	McAllister, Osman
6 September 1986	Manchester United	H	1–1	16,785	Kelly
13 September 1986	Sheffield Wednesday	A	2–2	21,603	McAllister, Moran
17 September 1986	Norwich City	A	1–2	14,814	Smith
20 September 1986	Tottenham Hotspur	H	1–2	13,141	Morgan
27 September 1986	Queens Park Rangers	A	1–0	10,021	Smith
4 October 1986	Manchester City	A	2–1	18,033	Sealy, Smith
11 October 1986	Nottingham Forest	H	2–1	18,402	Smith, McAllister (2, 1 pen)
18 October 1986	Charlton Athletic	A	0–2	5,770	
25 October 1986	Southampton	H	2–3	9,186	Osman, McAllister
1 November 1986	Aston Villa	A	0–2	14,529	
8 November 1986	Newcastle United	H	1–1	9,836	Smith
15 November 1986	Everton	H	0–2	13,450	
22 November 1986	Watford	A	1–5	13,605	Smith
29 November 1986	Chelsea	H	2–2	10,047	McAllister (pen), O'Neill
6 December 1986	Coventry City	A	0–1	12,320	
14 December 1986	Oxford United	H	2–0	8,480	Smith, Wilson
20 December 1986	Manchester United	A	0–2	34,180	
26 December 1986	Arsenal	H	1–1	19,205	Moran
28 December 1986	Everton	A	1–5	39,730	Moran
1 January 1987	West Ham United	A	1–4	16,625	Moran
3 January 1987	Sheffield Wednesday	H	6–1	10,851	Ramsey, Smith (2), Moran (3)
24 January 1987	Luton Town	A	0–1	9,102	
7 February 1987	Wimbledon	H	3–1	8,369	Smith, Ramsey (2)
14 February 1987	Liverpool	A	3–4	34,259	Smith (2), Johnston (own goal)
21 February 1987	Norwich City	H	0–2	8,742	
25 February 1987	Tottenham Hotspur	A	0–5	16,038	
7 March 1987	Southampton	A	0–4	11,611	
14 March 1987	Charlton Athletic	H	1–0	8,159	Smith
22 March 1987	Nottingham Forest	A	1–2	18,679	Mauchlen
25 March 1987	Queens Park Rangers	H	4–1	7,384	McAllister (2, 1 pen), Ramsey, McDonald (own goal)
28 March 1987	Manchester City	H	4–0	10,743	Morgan, Smith, McAllister, Ramsey
4 April 1987	Newcastle United	A	0–2	23,360	
11 April 1987	Aston Villa	H	1–1	11,933	Moran
18 April 1987	West Ham United	H	2–0	10,434	Smith, O'Neill
20 April 1987	Arsenal	A	1–4	18,767	Osman
25 April 1987	Watford	H	1–2	9,448	Moran
2 May 1987	Chelsea	A	1–3	11,975	Smith
4 May 1987	Coventry City	H	1–1	14,903	Ramsey
9 May 1987	Oxford United	A	0–0	10,183	

=== FA Cup ===
Round	Date	Opponent	Venue	Result	Attendance	Goalscorers
R3	10 January 1987	Queens Park Rangers	A	2–5	9,684	Smith, McAllister (pen)

=== League Cup ===
Round	Date	Opponent	Venue	Result	Attendance	Goalscorers
R2 First Leg	23 September 1986	Swansea City	A	2–0	9,590	McAllister, Smith
R2 Second Leg	8 October 1986	Swansea City	H	4–2	5,884	Morgan, Smith, Moran (2)
R3	29 October 1986	Liverpool	A	1–4	20,248	Moran

== Squad ==
Note: Flags indicate national team as defined under FIFA eligibility rules; some limited exceptions apply. Players may hold more than one non-FIFA nationality.

Pos.	Nation	Player
GK	ENG	Ian Andrews
MF	NIR	Paul Ramsey
DF	ENG	Mark Venus
DF	ENG	Russell Osman
DF	ENG	Steve Walsh
MF	SCO	Gary McAllister
FW	ENG	Alan Smith (on loan from Arsenal from March)
MF	SCO	Ian Wilson
FW	ENG	Tony Sealy
DF	ENG	Simon Morgan
FW	ENG	Steve Moran
DF	ENG	Andy Feeley

Pos.	Nation	Player
MF	SCO	Ali Mauchlen
MF	ENG	Paul Bunce
DF	NIR	John O'Neill
FW	ENG	Robert Alleyne
DF	ENG	Phil Horner
MF	ENG	Jean-Michel d'Avray (on loan from Ipswich Town)
MF	ENG	Paul Reid
FW	ENG	Steve Wilkinson
MF	ENG	Kevin Jobling
MF	SCO	John Buckley (on loan from Leeds United)
MF	IRL	Martin Russell

=== Left club during season ===
Note: Flags indicate national team as defined under FIFA eligibility rules; some limited exceptions apply. Players may hold more than one non-FIFA nationality.

Pos.	Nation	Player
MF	ENG	Ian Banks (Released)
FW	ENG	Mark Bright (to Crystal Palace)

Pos.	Nation	Player
MF	ENG	Rob Kelly (to Wolverhampton Wanderers)
MF	ENG	Steve Lynex (to West Bromwich Albion)
