= Andy Feeley =

English footballer, manager, and scout

Personal information
- Full name: Andrew James Feeley
- Date of birth: 30 September 1961 (age 65)
- Place of birth: Hereford, England
- Height: 5 ft 8 in (1.73 m)
- Positions: Right back; midfielder

Youth career
- –1979: Hereford United

Senior career*
Years	Team	Apps	(Gls)
1978–1980	Hereford United	50	(3)
1980	→ Chelsea (loan)	0	(0)
1980	Moorfields		
1980–1984	Trowbridge Town	85	(12)
1984–1987	Leicester City	76	(0)
1987–1989	Brentford	67	(0)
1989–1991	Bury	57	(3)
1991	Northwich Victoria	13	(1)
1991–1996	Atherton Laburnum Rovers	57	(2)
- Highfield United
- Seedfield Sports

Managerial career
- 2008–2009: Ramsbottom United
- * Club domestic league appearances and goals

Andrew James Feeley (born 30 September 1961) is an English retired professional footballer who played in the Football League for Leicester City, Brentford, Bury and Hereford United as a right back. He later became manager of North West Counties League club Ramsbottom United and also worked as scout.

== Playing career ==
=== Hereford United ===
A right back, Feeley joined hometown club Hereford United as an apprentice and made his first team debut in a Fourth Division match versus Bournemouth on 14 October 1978, at the age of just 17 years and 14 days. He became a regular pick throughout the rest of the 1978–79 season, making 25 appearances and even captaining the club, the youngest player ever to do so. After signing a professional contract, he was again a first team regular during the 1979–80 season, making 29 appearances and scoring three goals. He departed Edgar Street in 1980, after making 53 appearances and scoring three goals.

=== Moorfields ===
For a time after leaving Hereford United, Feeley played for Herefordshire Sunday League Second Division club Moorfields.

=== Trowbridge Town ===
Feeley signed for Southern League Midland Division club Trowbridge Town in 1980. He enjoyed a good season with the club, which finished third and was the only club from the division to win promotion to the Alliance Premier League. Feeley averaged 28 games per season in the Alliance Premier League for struggling Trowbridge, before departing Frome Road in January 1984. He made 85 appearances and scored 12 goals during his time with the club in the Alliance Premier League.

=== Leicester City ===
In a surprise move, Feeley signed for First Division club Leicester City in January 1984. He had to wait until 10 March to make his debut, which came with a baptism of fire against Manchester United at Old Trafford. Feeley started in the 2–0 defeat and was brought off for Tommy English. He made two further appearances during what remained of the 1983–84 season. He established himself in the first team in the 1984–85 season, making 41 appearances and winning the Supporters Club's Player of the Year award. Knee injuries reduced his appearance-count over the next two seasons and he departed the club in June 1987, after refusing a new contract. Feeley made 86 appearances during 3 1/2 years at Filbert Street.

=== Brentford ===
Feeley dropped down to the Third Division to sign on trial for Brentford in August 1987 and he subsequently signed a permanent contract. Though never fully fit during his two years at Griffin Park, he managed 88 appearances and was a member of the team which reached the quarter-finals of the FA Cup during the 1988–89 season, going out 4–0 to eventual winners Liverpool.

=== Bury ===
Feeley joined Third Division club Bury in July 1989. He made 57 league appearances and scored three goals in two seasons with the Shakers. While later working in the club's youth system in 2002, Feeley turned out for a Bury Veterans XI in a benefit match against their Bolton Wanderers counterparts.

=== Northwich Victoria ===
Feeley dropped back into non-League football in 1991 to sign for Conference club Northwich Victoria. He made 13 appearances and scored one goal during his spell.

=== Atherton Laburnum Rovers ===
Feeley joined North West Counties League First Division club Atherton Laburnum Rovers in 1991. He celebrated promotion to the Northern Premier League First Division as champions at the end of the 1993–94 season and remained with the club until 1996.

=== Highfield United ===
Feeley had a spell with Manchester League Premier Division club Highfield United in 1996.

=== Seedfield Sports ===
Feeley joined Bolton Combination club Seedfield Sports during the 1996 off-season. He scored with a 30-yard strike to send the club through to the last 16 of the Lancashire Amateur Shield.

== Managerial and coaching career ==
=== Seedfield Sports ===
While with Seedfield Sports, Feeley served as the club's assistant manager.

=== Bury ===
In the late 1990s, Feeley returned to former club Bury, working in the commercial and community areas. He later returned to the football club, serving as Director of Youth, overseeing the club's Centre of Excellence and managing the club's youth and reserve teams. He oversaw the development of future international players David Nugent and Colin Kazim-Richards. He coached the U19 team to the semi-finals of the 1999–00 Youth Alliance Cup, losing 2–0 to Scunthorpe United to be denied a chance of a place in the final at Wembley Stadium. For a time Feeley served as first team coach, before being replaced by Billy Ayre in December 2000. While Ayre was receiving treatment for cancer in July 2001, Feeley again stepped into the role.

=== Ramsbottom United ===
Feeley was appointed manager of North West Counties League Premier Division club Ramsbottom United in June 2008. Despite having to virtually rebuild the playing squad from scratch, he led the Rams to the top of the table early in the 2008–09 season. Feeley departed the club in February 2009.

== Personal life ==
After leaving professional football, Feeley was employed as a psychiatric nurse at Prestwich Hospital. In August 2009, he received a 22-month jail sentence for committing Grievous Bodily Harm.

== Career statistics ==
Appearances and goals by club, season and competition
Club	Season	League			FA Cup		League Cup		Other		Total	
Club	Season	Division	Apps	Goals	Apps	Goals	Apps	Goals	Apps	Goals	Apps	Goals
Hereford United	1978–79	Fourth Division	25	0	0	0	0	0	—		25	0
Hereford United	1979–80	Fourth Division	25	3	2	0	2	0	—		29	3
Hereford United	Total		50	3	2	0	2	0	—		54	3
Leicester City	1983–84	First Division	3	0	0	0	—		—		3	0
Leicester City	1984–85	First Division	35	0	4	0	2	0	—		41	0
Leicester City	1985–86	First Division	26	0	1	0	2	0	—		29	0
Leicester City	1986–87	First Division	12	0	1	0	0	0	—		13	0
Leicester City	Total		76	0	6	0	4	0	—		86	0
Brentford	1987–88	Third Division	34	0	1	0	2	0	2 (Note: Appearances in Football League Trophy)	0	39	0
Brentford	1988–89	Third Division	33	0	8	0	3	0	5	0	49	0
Brentford	Total		67	0	9	0	5	0	7	0	88	0
Career total			193	3	17	0	11	0	7	0	228	3
