= Davy McDougall =

Scottish footballer

Personal information
- Full name: David McDougall
- Place of birth: Irvine, Scotland
- Positions: Wing half; winger

Youth career
- Irvine Meadow

Senior career*
Years	Team	Apps	(Gls)
1899–1900	Rangers	0	(0)
1899–1900	→ Partick Thistle (loan)	18	(6)
1900–1901	Bristol City	11	(2)
1901–1902	Rangers	4	(3)
1901–1902	→ Distillery (loan)		
1902	→ Vale of Atholl (loan)		
1902–1905	Distillery		
1905–1910	Glentoran		
1910–1911	Cardiff City	20	(0)
1912–1913	Newport County	22	(1)

Managerial career
- 1910–1911: Cardiff City
- 1912–1914: Newport County
- * Club domestic league appearances and goals

David McDougall was a Scottish football player who played his club football for Partick Thistle and Rangers in Scotland, Bristol City in England, Distillery and Glentoran in Ireland and Cardiff City and Newport County in Wales. He joined Cardiff City as a player-manager in 1910, becoming the club's first manager in their history. He later went on to fulfil the same role at Newport County.

== Career ==
McDougall began his career playing locally for Irvine Meadow. He signed for Rangers without making a first team appearance, instead spending the season at Partick Thistle, playing all 18 games in the Scottish League Division Two championship winning side of 1899–1900. Following this success, he was recalled by Rangers who then quickly sold him on to Southern League side Bristol City in the summer of 1900. He made his debut at outside left in a 0–2 defeat at Luton Town on 15 September 1900. He made 11 appearances playing on both right and left wings in season 1900–01, scoring twice, when Bristol City were runners-up in the Southern League. He also played on both wings in 12 Western League games, scoring two goals. He rejoined Rangers in the summer of 1901 making four appearances in the early weeks of their Scottish League Division One championship winning campaign of 1901–02, although he was loaned out again, to Distillery in Ireland and Vale of Atholl in northern Scotland. He then joined Distillery on a permanent basis, also playing for fellow Belfast club Glentoran.

In 1910, McDougall was appointed manager of Southern League club Cardiff City, also being named club captain. McDougall was the first manager in the team's history as they entered their first campaign in the English football league system. He set about recruiting players from Scotland and the North of England ahead of the season, with eight of the club's 14 professionals being from the regions, including himself. He took charge of the team's first match in the Southern League, a 4–1 victory over Ton Pentre on 24 September 1910. Although he led the side to a fourth-placed finish in his first season, the club decided a full-time manager was needed to progress and relieved McDougall of his managerial role. He briefly remained with Cardiff under new manager Fred Stewart before leaving the club.

== Honours ==
Partick Thistle

Scottish League Division Two champions: 1899–1900

Sporting positions
Preceded by None	Cardiff City captain 1910–1911	Succeeded by Unknown
