= Paul Merson =

English footballer and pundit (born 1968)

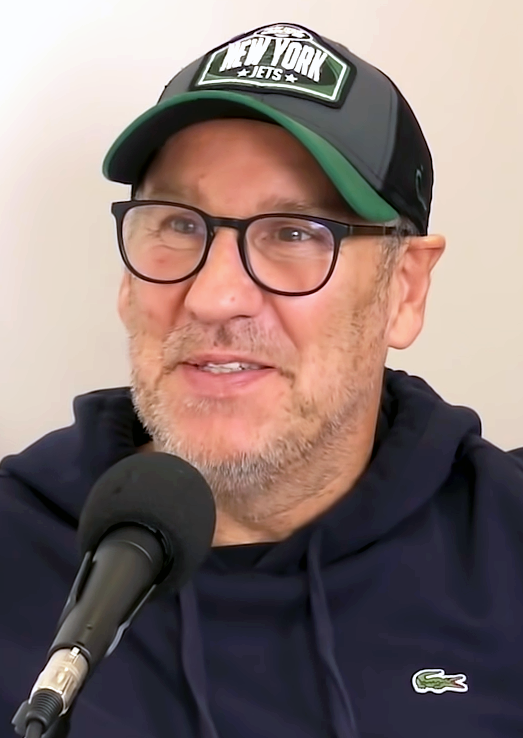
- Merson in 2021

Personal information
- Full name: Paul Charles Merson
- Date of birth: 20 March 1968 (age 58)
- Place of birth: Harlesden, London, England
- Height: 6 ft 0 in (1.83 m)
- Positions: Striker; winger; attacking midfielder

Youth career
- 1982–1985: Arsenal

Senior career*
Years	Team	Apps	(Gls)
1985–1997	Arsenal	327	(78)
1987	→ Brentford (loan)	7	(0)
1997–1998	Middlesbrough	48	(12)
1998–2002	Aston Villa	117	(18)
2002–2003	Portsmouth	45	(12)
2003–2006	Walsall	77	(6)
2006	Tamworth	1	(0)
2012	Welshpool Town	1	(1)
2017–2018	Caerau	1	(0)
2019–2020	Hanworth Villa	2	(0)
Total		626	(127)

International career
1988–1990	England U21	4	(0)
1991–1998	England B	4	(3)
1991–1998	England	21	(3)

Managerial career
- 2004–2006: Walsall
- * Club domestic league appearances and goals

Paul Charles Merson (born 20 March 1968) is an English former professional footballer, manager, commentator and sports television pundit for Sky Sports.

Originally a striker, Merson found success as a winger and an attacking midfielder and playmaker later in his career. After making his debut for Arsenal in the 1986–87 season, Merson went on to play eleven seasons with the North London club. While with the Gunners, Merson was a key player in the club's success under Scottish manager George Graham, winning the Football League Championship twice, the FA Cup, the Football League Cup, and the UEFA Cup Winners' Cup. In 1997, he joined Middlesbrough, helping the club gain promotion to the Premier League and finish as runner-up in the 1997–98 Football League Cup. After joining Aston Villa in 1998, Merson went on to become club captain and played for the team in the 2000 FA Cup final, the last to be held at the original Wembley Stadium. In 2002, he signed for second-tier Portsmouth and captained the club to the First Division Championship title and promotion to the Premier League. A year later, he returned to the West Midlands with Walsall, where he went on to serve as player-manager until he was sacked in February 2006.

Merson was capped 21 times for the England national football team and represented the nation at UEFA Euro 1992 and the 1998 FIFA World Cup. He has had four books published chronicling his life and career.

== Club career ==
=== Arsenal ===
Born on 20 March 1968 in Harlesden, North West London, Merson started his career at Arsenal, joining the club as an apprentice in 1984. After a loan spell at Brentford, then under manager Frank McLintock, he made his debut for the Gunners on 22 November 1986 against Manchester City, and gradually established himself in George Graham's successful Arsenal side of the late 1980s. By the 1988–89 season he was a regular starter as a striker alongside Alan Smith, at the end of which Arsenal secured the First Division title with a stoppage time Michael Thomas goal in the final game of the season against Liverpool at Anfield. Merson scored 14 goals that season, made his debut for the England U21 team, and was voted PFA Young Player of the Year.

In 1991, Merson achieved another league championship with Arsenal and had the highest goalscoring season of his career with 13 goals. He also won a double of the FA Cup and League Cup in 1993, scoring in the 1993 Football League Cup Final against Sheffield Wednesday. A year later, he helped Arsenal win its first European trophy in 24 years as the Gunners defeated Parma in Copenhagen to win the 1993–94 European Cup Winners' Cup.. Having started his career as a striker with Arsenal, he later moved to become a winger after the emergence of strikers like Kevin Campbell, the signing of Ian Wright and of course Smith who was still at the club. In later seasons he also played as an attacking midfielder after the arrival of Dennis Bergkamp. He played in a role behind Wright and Bergkamp.

Merson's career was put on the line in November 1994 when he admitted to having addictions to alcohol, cocaine and gambling. The Football Association arranged for Merson to undergo a three-month rehabilitation programme and he returned to the side in February 1995, just before the dismissal of George Graham as manager. Under caretaker manager Stewart Houston, Merson helped Arsenal reach the Cup Winners' Cup final for the second season in a row, where Arsenal lost to Real Zaragoza at the Parc des Princes in Paris.

In 1995–96, Merson remained a regular first team player under Arsenal's new manager Bruce Rioch and continued to play regularly during the 1996–97 season following the appointment of Arsène Wenger. In a somewhat surprising move, at the end of the 1996–97 Premiership campaign, in which Arsenal finished third, Merson was sold to relegated Middlesbrough in a £4.5million deal – making him the most expensive player ever signed by a non-Premiership club. Wenger had offered Merson a new two-year contract, but Merson elected to join Middlesbrough for a longer contract. Merson played 425 times for Arsenal and scored 99 goals in all competitions.

In 2008, Merson was ranked the 26th greatest Arsenal player of all time in a fan poll published by the club's official website.

=== Middlesbrough ===
In the summer of 1997, Merson signed with relegated Middlesbrough for a reported fee believed to be £4.5 million. Merson said he was offered a new contract at Arsenal but turned it down for the higher wages of a longer contract at Middlesbrough. He confessed subsequently, in a 2026 appearance on the Overlap podcast, that his motivation for the move was "pure greed," something he later came to regret. When telling Arsène Wenger of his decision, Merson claims Wenger told him he would be paid more at Middlesbrough than Dennis Bergkamp was paid at Arsenal.

Merson made his league debut for Boro on the opening day, in a 2–1 victory over Charlton Athletic. Nicknamed by fans "The Magic Man", he played a key role in helping Boro return to the Premier League. His Boro form won him a place in England's squad for 1998 FIFA World Cup in France. Whilst at Middlesbrough, he played in the 1998 Football League Cup Final.

=== Aston Villa ===
During the start of the 1998–99 season Merson stated he was home sick and wanted a return South. Middlesbrough later agreed to Merson's request and the 30-year-old was sold to Aston Villa for £6.75million. Merson scored on his Villa debut, converting from his own missed penalty. Merson said in an interview that playing at Villa was the best part of his career. He scored a 'wonder goal' winner versus Everton away from forty-five yards out in November 2000. Merson played a key creative role in the Villa side and helped them to the FA Cup Final in 2000, where they lost 1–0 to Chelsea.

=== Portsmouth ===
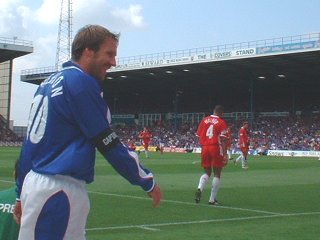
Merson playing for Portsmouth in 2002

Merson signed for Division 1 club Portsmouth on a two-year contract in August 2002, and was instrumental in the club's promotion to the Premiership in 2002–03. Merson, however, felt that he was too old for a return to the Premiership, and wanted to move closer to his home in the West Midlands. In July 2003 he signed a two-year deal at Walsall in the First Division, paying compensation to Portsmouth for his remaining year of contract.

=== Walsall ===
In February 2004, Merson admitted himself to the Sierra Tucson Clinic in Arizona to seek help for his gambling addiction under the advice and financial backing of the PFA, and missed several key games whilst Walsall slipped in the league from mid table mediocrity into the relegation zone. However, a couple of months after his return, Merson was quickly thrown into the manager's spot at Walsall following Colin Lee's sacking for allegedly having talks with Plymouth Argyle over a vacant manager's position there. Merson led a bid to retain Division One status, but was hindered by a last-minute penalty against Crystal Palace, and eventually relegated after a 3–2 victory against Rotherham United whilst having to rely on Stoke City beating Gillingham on the final day. The following month, despite relegation, Merson was rewarded with the manager's job on a permanent basis.

The 2004–05 season proved to be a difficult season for Merson, on and off the field. Walsall went out of all cup competitions against lower league teams, and it was reported that Merson had had a rift with his wife, and had started drinking and gambling again, whilst the press reported on him inviting goalkeeper Mark Bosnich back into the game. Walsall slipped close to a second consecutive relegation. Merson responded by making several key signings on transfer deadline day; Julian Joachim, Andy Oakes, Anthony Gerrard (cousin of Steven Gerrard), Craig Pead and David Perpetuini. Merson's side went undefeated during May 2005, securing League One status for another year.

After a difficult first season in management, Merson's position at Walsall looked more secure as the club entered the 2005–06 season; however, he was unable to lift Walsall out of the relegation zone, and with the club in 19th place, he was sacked on 6 February 2006 after his Walsall side lost 5–0 to Brentford at Griffin Park.

=== Tamworth ===
Despite a number of offers from clubs as high as the Championship, Merson decided to drop down the leagues and play for part-time Conference club Tamworth, which surprised many but enthralled the Tamworth fans. However, the arrangement meant that until the end of the season, the majority of Merson's wages were to be paid by the club he used to manage, Walsall. Merson played just once, in the 2–1 home loss to Halifax Town. He was dropped to the bench for the following game, a 5–0 defeat away to Grays Athletic. Merson later announced his retirement from professional football as a player on 9 March 2006, less than a month after joining Tamworth.

=== Later career ===
On 28 March 2012, he made a one-off appearance for Mid Wales Football League side Welshpool Town, playing alongside fellow Sky Sports pundit Chris Kamara against Newbridge-on-Wye. Merson scored the opening goal in the 4–1 defeat at the Maes y Dre Recreation Ground. On 11 October 2017, Merson signed for Welsh Football League Division Three team Caerau. Following international clearance, he made his debut on 18 October against Pontyclun. In December 2019, Merson joined Hanworth Villa in the Combined Counties League Premier Division, making two appearances for the Villains in total.

== International career ==
=== Euro 1992 ===
Merson first played for the England national team in 1991, being called up by Graham Taylor. The 23-year-old made his debut for the full England side, in a friendly against Germany on 11 September 1991. He participated in the 1992 European Championships in Sweden. He played in the opening 0–0 draw with Denmark. England went out after another 0–0 draw against the French and a 2–1 loss to hosts Sweden.

=== 1994 World Cup qualifying ===
Merson also played a part in the failed campaign to qualify for the 1994 FIFA World Cup. He played in the opening game, a 1–1 home draw with Norway. He next played against the Netherlands as a substitute for Paul Gascoigne who was injured. England were leading 2–1, but crucially conceded a late penalty for a 2–2 draw. Merson also played in the 1993 US Cup against Brazil and Germany, nearly scoring in a 2–1 defeat to the later, Bodo Illgner saving from a 20-yard shot. He returned for the critical and controversial 2–0 defeat against the Dutch in Rotterdam. Merson nearly equalised the opening Dutch goal, and hit the post with an excellent free-kick.

England failed to qualify for the World Cup. Taylor's successor, Terry Venables, told Merson that he would not get into the team owing to his life style of heavy drinking. In his book, How Not to be a Professional Footballer, Merson refers to an incident in Chicago while on duty with England during the US Cup. After drinking he wandered off into the city on his own. Merson ended up in a dangerous area and was involved in trying to break up a fight while very drunk himself. When the combatants turned on Merson, he fled back to the hotel. The next morning the FBI came to the hotel and briefed the players on the dangers in the city. They expressed surprise that Merson was not injured in the incident.

=== 1998 World Cup ===
Merson held the distinction of being the only player in England's 1998 FIFA World Cup squad not to play for a top flight club. In that tournament, he played in England's famous second round match against Argentina, coming off the bench and scoring in the penalty shoot-out, although England eventually lost. Later he said if England had won their penalty shoot-out he believed England would have won the World Cup.

1998 marked the end of Merson's international career after 21 full caps in seven years, in which he scored three times.

== Media career ==
In August 2006, he commenced a column for the official Arsenal FC magazine. He also continues to play for the England Legends, a 16-man squad of former internationals who have played Italy, Germany, Scotland, Ireland, and the rest of the world. Merson's main job is on Sky Sports, where he is a match reporter and regular pundit for Gillette Soccer Saturday. Merson is often the target of good-humoured jabs from Jeff Stelling and other members of the Soccer Saturday panel; for example, in his attempts to pronounce the names of foreign players. However, Stelling himself, in September 2016, attempted to have Merson agree with him that Ireland international Harry Arter (who had made his debut against England) should get an England call-up in the week Gareth Southgate took over in an emergency capacity following Sam Allardyce's dismissal.

Merson writes a weekly column for the Daily Star's 'Seriously Football' pullout every Saturday and predicts scores for the weeks premier league games called 'Merson Predicts'.

From the 2012–2015 season Merson co-hosted with John Fendley on the Sky Sports TV programme 'Fantasy Football Club'. From the start of the 2015 season Max Rushden took on co presenting after John Fendley returned to Soccer AM as a co-host. Fantasy Football Club is aired weekly on Friday evenings at 6pm. Both co-hosts also co-managed a fantasy team in the Sky Fantasy 'Celebrities' League.

In 2019, Merson won the second series of the 5Star competition Celebs on the Farm. From September 2024, Merson was a contestant on the twenty-second series of Strictly Come Dancing and was partnered with Karen Hauer. The couple remained until week 5 when, on 20 October 2024, they lost in the dance-off.

== Personal life ==
Born in Harlesden, North-West London, Merson supported Chelsea growing up, and has remained a fan throughout his life.

He has been married three times (to Lorraine, Louise and now Kate), and has eight children, including one set of twin girls. His first marriage crumbled under his recovery from drug addiction and alcoholism. One of his sons, Sam, is also a footballer, who was playing for non-league side Hanworth Villa as of 2025.

In October 2011, Merson was involved in a car crash with a lorry on the M40 motorway near Warwick and arrested for drunk driving.

While appearing on Harry's Heroes: The Full English, a 2019 ITV documentary, Merson opened up about how substance abuse and gambling have affected his life, and his continued struggles with addictions. He received praise for his candid discussion of the topic. In the second series, Merson confided in former Arsenal teammate, goalkeeper David Seaman, that he voluntarily attends Alcoholics Anonymous, including English-speaking meetings in Paris, during breaks in filming for ITV's Harry's Heroes S2.Ep1.

Merson participated in the Mental Health Awareness Week. In January 2020, Merson spoke about how his drink, drug and gambling habits fuelled his struggles with mental health.

In February 2024, Merson was probed by the Advertising Standards Authority for misconduct while promoting and advertising Supreme CBD, owned by ex-boxer Anthony Fowler. Fowler along with other celebrities including Merson, Matt Le Tissier and John Hartson have all been investigated and issued with a warning by the ASA. The ASA investigation concluded that their social media posts have been found to be commercial in nature, and not "honest" opinions about the benefits of CBD, since they were being financially rewarded for their posts. The investigation also concluded that in the posts made by these celebrities there were unlawful medical claims about the use of CBD, a substance prohibited by the Medicines and Healthcare products Regulatory Agency.

In May 2024, Merson was banned from driving for six months following a series of speeding offences.

During a Thanksgiving NFL show on Sky in November 2024, Merson revealed that he is a fan of the New York Jets.

== Career statistics ==
Appearances and goals by club, season and competition
Club	Season	League			FA Cup		League Cup		Europe		Other		Total	
Club	Season	Division	Apps	Goals	Apps	Goals	Apps	Goals	Apps	Goals	Apps	Goals	Apps	Goals
Arsenal	1986–87	First Division	7	3	–		–		–		–		7	3
Arsenal	1987–88	First Division	15	5	1	0	1	0	0	0	0	0	17	5
Arsenal	1988–89	First Division	37	10	2	2	4	2	0	0	0	0	43	14
Arsenal	1989–90	First Division	29	7	3	0	3	0	0	0	1 (Note: Appearance in FA Charity Shield)	0	36	7
Arsenal	1990–91	First Division	37	13	8	1	4	2	–		–		49	16
Arsenal	1991–92	First Division	42	12	1	0	3	1	4 (Note: Appearances in European Cup)	0	1	0	51	13
Arsenal	1992–93	Premier League	33	6	8	1	9	1	–		–		50	8
Arsenal	1993–94	Premier League	33	7	3	0	4	2	8 (Note: Appearances in European Cup Winners' Cup)	3	1	0	49	12
Arsenal	1994–95	Premier League	24	4	0	0	2	1	8 (Note: Appearances in UEFA Cup)	2	2 (Note: Appearances in European Super Cup)	0	36	7
Arsenal	1995–96	Premier League	38	5	2	0	7	0	–		–		47	5
Arsenal	1996–97	Premier League	32	6	3	0	3	1	2	2	–		40	9
Arsenal	Total		327	78	31	4	40	10	22	7	5	0	425	99
Middlesbrough	1997–98	First Division	45	12	3	1	7	3	–		–		55	16
Middlesbrough	1998–99	Premier League	3	0	–		–		–		–		3	0
Middlesbrough	Total		48	12	3	1	7	3	–		–		58	16
Aston Villa	1998–99	Premier League	26	5	1	0	–		–		–		27	5
Aston Villa	1999–2000	Premier League	32	5	6	0	7	0	–		–		45	5
Aston Villa	2000–01	Premier League	38	6	3	0	1	0	3 (Note: Appearances in UEFA Intertoto Cup)	0	–		45	6
Aston Villa	2001–02	Premier League	21	2	1	0	0	0	5	1	–		27	3
Aston Villa	2002–03	Premier League	–		–		–		1	0	–		1	0
Aston Villa	Total		117	18	11	0	8	0	9	1	–		145	19
Portsmouth	2002–03	First Division	45	12	1	0	2	0	–		–		48	12
Walsall	2003–04	First Division	34	4	0	0	2	2	–		–		36	6
Walsall	2004–05	League One	36	2	0	0	1	0	–		–		37	2
Walsall	2005–06	League One	7	0	0	0	1	0	–		–		8	0
Walsall	Total		77	6	0	0	4	2	–		–		81	8
Career total			614	126	42	5	57	15	30	8	6	0	749	154

== Honours ==
Arsenal

- Football League First Division: 1988–89, 1990–91
- FA Cup: 1992–93
- Football League Cup: 1992–93
- Football League Centenary Trophy: 1988
- FA Charity Shield: 1991
- European Cup Winners' Cup: 1993–94

Middlesbrough

- Football League Cup runner-up: 1997–98

Aston Villa

- UEFA Intertoto Cup: 2001
- FA Cup runner-up: 1999–2000

Portsmouth

- Football League First Division: 2002–03

Individual

- PFA Young Player of the Year: 1989
- Alan Hardaker Trophy: 1993
- PFA Team of the Year: 1997–98 First Division, 2002–03 First Division 2004–05 League One
- North-East FWA Player of the Year: 1998
- Premier League Player of the Month: February 2000

== Publications ==
- Merson, Paul; Merson, Lorraine (1995). Rock Bottom. London: Bloomsbury. ISBN 978-0747523680.
- Merson, Paul; Ridley, Ian (2000). Hero and Villain: A Year in the Life of Paul Merson. London: Harper Collins Willow. ISBN 978-0002188968.
- Merson, Paul; Allen, Matt (2012). How Not to Be a Professional Footballer. London: Harper Sport. ISBN 978-0007424979.
- Merson, Paul (2021). Hooked: Addiction and the Long Road to Recovery. London: Headline. ISBN 978-1472282545.
