= 1987–88 Leicester City F.C. season =

1987–88 season of Leicester City

Leicester City
1987–88 season
- Chairman: Terry Shipman
- Manager: Bryan Hamilton (until 11 December); David Pleat (from 24 December)
- Second Division: 13th
- FA Cup: Third round
- League Cup: Third round
- Full Members Cup: Third round
- Top goalscorer: League: Gary McAllister (9); All: Mike Newell (11)
- Average home league attendance: 10,157

During the 1987–88 English football season, Leicester City F.C. competed in the Football League Second Division.

== Season summary ==
Leicester started the season poorly with five defeats from their first six league games, which put manager Hamilton under real pressure. He signed strikers Jari Rantanen from IFK Göteborg and Mike Newell from Luton Town for a club record £350,000 to make prospects a little brighter, but two wins in eleven league games cost Hamilton his job in December. He was replaced by former Tottenham Hotspur manager David Pleat, and fortunes turned in the second half of the season, with Leicester losing only four league games during that period and scoring in each of their final sixteen league fixtures.

== Final league table ==
Pos	Team	Pld	W	D	L	GF	GA	GD	Pts
11	Stoke City	44	17	11	16	50	57	−7	62
12	Swindon Town	44	16	11	17	73	60	+13	59
13	Leicester City	44	16	11	17	62	61	+1	59
14	Barnsley	44	15	12	17	61	62	−1	57
15	Hull City	44	14	15	15	54	60	−6	57

Rules for classification: 1) Points; 2) Goal difference; 3) Goals scored

== Results ==
Leicester City's score comes first

=== Legend ===
Win	Draw	Loss

=== Football League Second Division ===
Date	Opponent	Venue	Result	Attendance	Scorers
15 August 1987	Shrewsbury Town	H	0–1	8,469	
19 August 1987	Leeds United	A	0–1	21,034	
29 August 1987	Millwall	H	1–0	7,559	Moran
31 August 1987	Stoke City	A	1–2	9,948	McAllister
5 September 1987	Aston Villa	H	0–2	10,286	
12 September 1987	Crystal Palace	A	1–2	8,925	McAllister
16 September 1987	Oldham Athletic	H	4–1	7,358	Newell, Rantanen, Ford, Wilson
19 September 1987	Plymouth Argyle	H	4–0	8,872	Wilson, Ford, Newell, Rantanen
26 September 1987	Bournemouth	A	3–2	7,969	Newell, Osman, Mauchlen
30 September 1987	Ipswich Town	H	1–1	11,533	Moran
3 October 1987	Manchester City	A	2–4	16,481	Newell, Rantanen
10 October 1987	Barnsley	H	0–0	8,665	
17 October 1987	Sheffield United	A	1–2	10,593	McAllister
21 October 1987	West Bromwich Albion	H	3–0	9,262	Walsh, Moran (2)
24 October 1987	Hull City	A	2–2	8,826	McAllister, Walsh
31 October 1987	Blackburn Rovers	H	1–2	8,650	Moran
7 November 1987	Swindon Town	H	3–2	8,346	Ramsey, Walsh, Venus
14 November 1987	Birmingham City	A	2–2	8,666	Walsh, Cusack
21 November 1987	Bradford City	H	0–2	11,543	
28 November 1987	Huddersfield Town	A	0–1	6,704	
5 December 1987	Middlesbrough	H	0–0	9,411	
12 December 1987	Oldham Athletic	A	0–2	4,785	
26 December 1987	Bournemouth	H	0–1	11,452	
28 December 1987	Plymouth Argyle	A	0–4	15,581	
1 January 1988	Millwall	A	0–1	7,220	
2 January 1988	Crystal Palace	H	4–4	10,104	Brien, McAllister (pen), Reid, Wilkinson
16 January 1988	Shrewsbury Town	A	0–0	5,025	
30 January 1988	Reading	A	2–1	6,645	Osman, Walsh
6 February 1988	Aston Villa	A	1–2	18,867	Newell
13 February 1988	Leeds United	H	3–2	11,937	McAllister (2, 1 pen), Cross
20 February 1988	Ipswich Town	A	2–0	11,084	Reid, Newell
27 February 1988	Manchester City	H	1–0	13,852	Cross
5 March 1988	Sheffield United	H	1–0	12,256	Cross
12 March 1988	Barnsley	A	1–1	7,447	Walsh
16 March 1988	Stoke City	H	1–1	10,502	Mauchlen
19 March 1988	Blackburn Rovers	A	3–3	9,564	Reid (2), Newell
26 March 1988	Hull City	H	2–1	10,353	Newell, Weir (pen)
2 April 1988	Swindon Town	A	2–3	9,450	Osman, McAllister
5 April 1988	Birmingham City	H	2–0	13,541	Osman (2)
9 April 1988	West Bromwich Albion	A	1–1	11,013	Cross
23 April 1988	Reading	H	1–0	9,603	Walsh
30 April 1988	Bradford City	A	1–4	14,393	Reid
2 May 1988	Huddersfield Town	H	3–0	9,803	Cross (2), Groves
7 May 1988	Middlesbrough	A	2–1	27,645	Weir, McAllister

=== FA Cup ===
Round	Date	Opponent	Venue	Result	Attendance	Goalscorers
R3	9 January 1988	Oxford United	A	0–2	7,557	

=== League Cup ===
Round	Date	Opponent	Venue	Result	Attendance	Goalscorers
R2 1st leg	23 September 1987	Scunthorpe United	H	2–1	7,718	McAllister, Newell
R2 2nd leg	6 October 1987	Scunthorpe United	A	2–1 (won 4-2 on agg)	4,031	Reid, Rantanen
R3	28 October 1987	Oxford United	A	0–0	14,586	Newell, Reid
R3R	4 November 1987	Oxford United	H	2–3	10,476	Newell (2)

=== Full Members Cup ===
Round	Date	Opponent	Venue	Result	Attendance	Goalscorers
R1	10 November 1987	Huddersfield Town	H	1–0	3,440	Ford
R2	1 December 1987	Charlton Athletic	H	2–1 (a.e.t.)	1,327	Jobling (2)
R3	19 January 1988	Stoke City	A	0–0 (lost 3-5 on pens)	5,161	

== Squad ==
Note: Flags indicate national team as defined under FIFA eligibility rules; some limited exceptions apply. Players may hold more than one non-FIFA nationality.

Pos.	Nation	Player
GK	ENG	Ian Andrews
DF	ENG	Simon Morgan
MF	WAL	Robbie James
DF	ENG	Russell Osman
DF	ENG	Tony Spearing
DF	ENG	Steve Walsh
MF	SCO	Ian Wilson
MF	ENG	Gary Ford
MF	SCO	Gary McAllister
MF	ENG	Nick Cusack
MF	NIR	Paul Ramsey
MF	IRL	Martin Russell
DF	ENG	Mark Venus
FW	ENG	Steve Moran
FW	ENG	Steve Wilkinson
DF	ENG	Phil Horner

Pos.	Nation	Player
MF	ENG	Paul Reid
GK	ENG	Paul Cooper
MF	SCO	Ali Mauchlen (captain)
FW	FIN	Jari Rantanen
FW	ENG	Mike Newell
DF	IRL	Tony Brien
DF	IRL	Dave Langan (on loan from Oxford United)
MF	ENG	Kevin Jobling
MF	NOR	Kjetil Osvold (on loan from Nottingham Forest)
MF	SCO	Kevin MacDonald (on loan from Liverpool)
MF	SCO	Peter Weir
DF	ENG	Steve Prindiville
FW	ENG	Nicky Cross
MF	ENG	Phil Turner
DF	ENG	Grant Brown
MF	ENG	Paul Groves
