= Harry's Heroes =

- Also known as: The Full English (series 1); Euro Having a Laugh (series 2)
- Genre: Sports documentary
- Starring: Harry Redknapp; John Barnes; Luke Worthington; David Seaman; Matt Le Tissier; Paul Merson; Neil Ruddock; Robbie Fowler; Rob Lee; Ray Parlour; Mark Wright; Chris Waddle; Mark Chamberlain; Lee Hendrie; Steve Howey; Michael Owen; Teddy Sheringham; Jamie Thompson; Vinnie Jones
- Country of origin: United Kingdom
- Original language: English
- No. of series: 2
- No. of episodes: 6

Production
- Running time: 60 minutes

Original release
- Network: ITV
- Release: 18 March 2019 – 20 May 2020

Harry's Heroes is an English documentary television programme produced by Fremantle for ITV. The first series Harry's Heroes: The Full English aired in March 2019. Series 2, entitled Harry's Heroes: Euro Having a Laugh aired in May 2020.

It featured former football manager Harry Redknapp attempting get a squad of former England international footballers back fit and healthy for one last game, vs a Germany Legends team. Redknapp was joined by an injured John Barnes, who acted as his assistant manager, and by sports scientist Luke Worthington, who analysed the players' weights and fitness throughout the course of filming the show.

== Episodes ==
=== Series overview ===
Series	Episodes	Originally released	
Series	Episodes	First released	Last released
1	3	23 March 2019	7 April 2019
2	3	29 April 2020	20 May 2020

=== Series 1 ===
==== Episode 1 ====
Episode 1 aired on 18 March 2019. Harry Redknapp meets up with his squad of players, who aren't expecting what is to come. The squad got weighed and had their bodies analysed, before they played their first game against Ridgeway Rovers Youth Football Club, losing 2-1, with the game ending early to prevent injuries. Whilst the majority of players begin working to become fitter and slimmer, Neil Ruddock goes on a cruise holiday. David Seaman takes Robbie Fowler and Paul Merson fishing, where Merson reveals his struggles with drugs, alcohol and gambling. Back on the training field, the squad are put through a bleep test. Mark Wright and Ray Parlour meet a golf course, before luring John Barnes into joining the squad's dieting regime, despite not being able to play. The squad meet up again, first in a gym for some strength and endurance training, and later in a recording studio to re-record World in Motion. They played their second game vs Crystal Palace Ladies, winning 1-0.

==== Episode 2 ====
Episode 2 aired on 19 March 2019. The majority of the squad jetted off to Spain for a training camp, in which Robbie Fowler missed a training session due to a hangover. Meanwhile in England, Paul Merson revealed he had fallen back into a gambling addiction, and met up with Drewe Broughton, a former footballer who had suffered with addictions himself. The squad regather in England, where Merson again speaks with Seaman and Fowler about his struggles, before a number of the squad go for a session of cryotherapy, a new science used by today's modern footballers. Neil Ruddock meets up with former footballer and heart attack survivor David Ginola to talk about his health, before going for a personal check-up with a doctor, where he learns he is at a high risk of heart problems. The full squad regather to be suited up and weighed for the last time ahead of their third game, vs a Germany Legends team. Pre-match, the team were shown well-wishing videos sent in by Peter Shilton and Paul Gascoigne wishing them well, before winning the game itself 4-2.

== Cast ==
=== The Full English (Season 1) ===
==== England Team ====
No.	Name	Pos.	Age	Former Club(s) (Note: Club(s) that the player was signed on for at the time of their England appearances)	England Caps	England Goals	England Era	Football Career
Main Squad
1	David Seaman	GK	19 September 1963 (aged 55)	(England) Queens Park Rangers, (England) Arsenal	75	0	1988–2002	1982–2004
2	Rob Lee	MF	1 February 1966 (aged 53)	(England) Newcastle United	21	2	1994–1998	1983–2006
3	Lee Sharpe	MF	27 May 1971 (aged 47)	(England) Manchester United	8	0	1991–1993	1987–2004
4	Ray Parlour	MF	7 March 1973 (aged 46)	(England) Arsenal	10	0	1999–2000	1992–2007
5	Neil Ruddock	DF	9 May 1968 (aged 50)	(England) Liverpool	1	0	1994	1985–2003
6	Mark Wright	DF	1 August 1963 (aged 55)	(England) Southampton, (England) Derby County, (England) Liverpool	45	1	1984–1996	1980–1998
7	Matt Le Tissier	MF	14 October 1968 (aged 50)	(England) Southampton	8	0	1994–1997	1986–2003
8	Chris Waddle	MF	14 December 1960 (aged 58)	(England) Newcastle United, (England) Tottenham Hotspur, (France) Marseille	62	6	1985–1991	1978–2002
9	Robbie Fowler	FW	9 April 1975 (aged 43)	(England) Liverpool, (England) Leeds United	26	7	1996–2002	1993–2012
10	Paul Merson	MF	20 March 1968 (aged 50)	(England) Arsenal, (England) Middlesbrough, (England) Aston Villa	21	3	1991–1998	1985–2006
11	Mark Chamberlain	MF	19 November 1961 (aged 57)	(England) Stoke City	8	1	1982–1984	1978–1998
Guest Substitutes
12	Steve Howey	DF	26 October 1971 (aged 47)	(England) Newcastle United	4	0	1994–1996	1989–2010
14	Andy Gray	MF	22 February 1964 (aged 55)	(England) Crystal Palace	1	0	1991	1980–1998
15	Alan Kennedy	DF	31 August 1954 (aged 64)	(England) Liverpool	2	0	1984	1972–1994
16	Michael Thomas	MF	24 August 1967 (aged 51)	(England) Arsenal	2	0	1988–1989	1984–2001
17	Lee Hendrie	MF	18 May 1977 (aged 41)	(England) Aston Villa	1	0	1998	1994–2019
18	Paul Walsh	FW	1 October 1962 (aged 56)	(England) Liverpool	5	1	1983–1984	1979–1996

Players' ages are as of the opening episode of Season 1 (18 March 2019).

==== Coaching staff ====
Role.	Name	Age	Notable Former Club(s)	England Caps	England Goals	England Era	Football Career	Management Career
Manager	Harry Redknapp	2 March 1947 (aged 72)	(England) West Ham United, (England) Tottenham Hotspur	0	0	N/A	1965–1982	1983–2017
Assistant Manager	John Barnes	7 November 1963 (aged 55)	(England) Liverpool	79	11	1983–1995	1980–1999	1999–2009
Fitness Coach	Luke Worthington	TBC	N/A	N/A	N/A	N/A	N/A	N/A

Coaches' ages are as of the opening episode of Season 1 (18 March 2019).

=== Euro Having a Laugh (Season 2) ===
==== England Team ====
No.	Name	Pos.	Age	Former Club(s) (Note: Club(s) that the player was signed on for at the time of their England appearances)	England Caps	England Goals	England Era	Football Career
Main Squad
	David Seaman	GK	19 September 1963 (aged 56)	(England) Queens Park Rangers, (England) Arsenal	75	0	1994–1998	1983–2006
	Rob Lee	MF	1 February 1966 (aged 54)	(England) Newcastle United	21	2	1994–1998	1983–2006
	Lee Sharpe	MF	27 May 1971 (aged 48)	(England) Manchester United	8	0	1991–1993	1987–2004
	Ray Parlour	MF	7 March 1973 (aged 47)	(England) Arsenal	10	0	1999–2000	1992–2007
	Neil Ruddock	DF	9 May 1968 (aged 51)	(England) Liverpool	1	0	1994	1985–2003
	Mark Wright	DF	1 August 1963 (aged 56)	(England) Southampton; Derby County; Liverpool	45	1	1984–1996	1980–1998
	Matt Le Tissier	MF	14 October 1968 (aged 51)	(England) Southampton	8	0	1994–1997	1986–2003
	Lee Hendrie	MF	18 May 1977 (aged 42)	(England) Aston Villa	1	0	1998	1994–2019
	Paul Merson	MF	20 March 1968 (aged 52)	(England) Arsenal, (England) Middlesbrough, (England) Aston Villa	21	3	1991–1998	1985–2006
	Mark Chamberlain	MF	19 November 1961 (aged 58)	(England) Stoke City	8	1	1982–1984	1978–1998
Substitutes/Guest Players
	Dave Beasant	GK	20 March 1959 (aged 61)	(England) Newcastle United	2	0	1989	1978–2008
	Steve Howey	DF	26 October 1971 (aged 48)	(England) Newcastle United	4	0	1994–1996	1989–2010
	Alan Kennedy	DF	31 August 1954 (aged 65)	(England) Liverpool	2	0	1984	1972–1994
	Andy Gray	MF	31 August 1964 (aged 55)	(England) Crystal Palace	1	0	1991	1980–1998
	Michael Gray	MF	31 August 1974 (aged 45)	(England) Sunderland	3	0	1999	1992–2010
	(Wales) Vinnie Jones	MF	5 January 1965 (aged 55)	(England) Wimbledon	9^{1}	0 ^{1}	1994–1997^{1}	1984–1999
	Michael Thomas	MF	24 August 1967 (aged 52)	(England) Arsenal	2	0	1988–1989	1984–2001
	Trevor Steven	MF	21 September 1963 (aged 56)	(England) Everton, (Scotland) Rangers, (France) Marseille	36	4	1985–1992	1980–1997
	Jamie Thompson	MF	N/A	None	0^{2}	0^{2}	N/A	N/A
	Paul Walsh	FW	1 October 1962 (aged 57)	(England) Liverpool	5	1	1983–1984	1979–1996
	Teddy Sheringham	FW	2 April 1966 (aged 54)	(England) Tottenham Hotspur (England) Manchester United	51	11	1993–2002	1983–2008
	Kevin Phillips	FW	25 July 1973 (aged 46)	(England) Sunderland	8	0	1999–2002	1991–2014
	Darius Vassell	FW	13 June 1980 (aged 39)	(England) Aston Villa	22	6	2002–2004	1998–2012
	Michael Owen	FW	14 December 1979 (aged 40)	(England) Liverpool (Spain) Real Madrid (England) Newcastle United	89	40	1998–2008	1996–2013

Players' ages are as of the opening episode of Season 2 (29 April 2020).

Vinnie Jones caps, goals and time spent in national team denotes to his appearances for Wales and not England. Jones was born in England but represented Wales at International level, despite this he appeared as a guest for the England legends in Season Two.
Jamie Thompson is not a footballer, and was the teams physiotherapist who was forced to play due to injuries to some of the players.

==== Coaching staff ====
Role.	Name	Age	Notable Former Club(s)	England Caps	England Goals	England Era	Football Career	Management Career
Manager	Harry Redknapp	2 March 1947 (aged 73)	(England) West Ham United, (England) Tottenham Hotspur	0	0	N/A	1965–1982	1983–2017
Assistant Manager	John Barnes	7 November 1963 (aged 56)	(England) Liverpool	79	11	1983–1995	1980–1999	1999–2009
Fitness Coach	Luke Worthington	TBC	N/A	N/A	N/A	N/A	N/A	N/A
Physiotherapist	Jamie Thompson	TBC	N/A	N/A	N/A	N/A	N/A	N/A

Coaches' ages are as of the opening episode of Season 2 (29 April 2020).
Ruddock participated in the first two episodes but did not play owing to a heart condition. Jamie Thompson, the team's physio, played in the match against San Marino.

== Games ==
=== Series One (2019) ===
The two episodes showed highlights of three games played by Harry's Heroes, winning two and losing one.

England Legends	1–2	Ridgeway Rovers Youth F.C.
Robbie Fowler		Goal

The Harlow Arena, Harlow

		England Legends Starting XI:
GK	1	David Seaman
CB	12	Neil Ruddock
CB	14	Mark Wright
CB	8	Ray Parlour
MF	3	Lee Sharpe
MF	7	Matt Le Tissier
MF	11	Mark Chamberlain
MF	2	Rob Lee
MF	8	Chris Waddle
SS	10	Paul Merson
CF	9	Robbie Fowler
Substitutions
DF	12	Steve Howey
Manager:
Harry Redknapp

England Legends	1–0	Crystal Palace L.F.C.
Paul Merson	Report

Princes Park, Dartford

		England Legends Starting XI:
GK	1	David Seaman
CB	12	Neil Ruddock
CB		Alan Kennedy
CB	12	Steve Howey
MF		Andy Gray
MF	7	Matt Le Tissier
MF	11	Mark Chamberlain
MF	2	Rob Lee
MF	3	Lee Sharpe
SS	10	Paul Merson
CF		Michael Thomas
Substitutions
DF		Unknown crew member
Manager:
Harry Redknapp

England Legends	4–2	Germany Legends
Robbie Fowler 32', 58'; Rob Lee 68'; Paul Merson 90'	Report	Maurizio Gaudino 46' (pen.); Dariusz Wosz 48'

Brisbane Road, Leyton, London
Referee: Mark Clattenburg

		England Legends Starting XI:
GK	1	David Seaman
CB	12	Neil Ruddock
CB	14	Mark Wright
CB	8	Ray Parlour
MF	3	Lee Sharpe
MF	7	Matt Le Tissier
MF	11	Mark Chamberlain
MF	2	Rob Lee
MF	8	Chris Waddle
SS	10	Paul Merson
CF	9	Robbie Fowler
Substitutions
DF	12	Steve Howey
DF		Alan Kennedy
MF		Andy Gray
MF		Lee Hendrie
FW		Paul Walsh
Manager:
Harry Redknapp

=== Series Two (2020) ===
(France) FC Metz veterans	3-1	England Legends
		Paul Merson

		England Legends Starting XI:
GK	1	David Seaman
RB	8	Ray Parlour
CB	12	Andy Gray
CB	14	Steve Howey
LB	3	Lee Sharpe
MF	7	Matt Le Tissier
MF	11	Mark Chamberlain
MF	2	Rob Lee
MF	4	Lee Hendrie
SS	10	Paul Merson
CF	9	Michael Owen
Substitutions
FW	13	Paul Walsh
MF	15	Trevor Steven
Manager:
Harry Redknapp

San Marino	3-5	England Legends
		Lee Hendrie; Andy Gray; Michael Gray

San Marino Stadium, San Marino

		England Legends Starting XI
GK	1	David Seaman
CB	4	Vinnie Jones
CB	6	Mark Wright
CB	15	Alan Kennedy
RWB	16	Michael Gray
CM	12	Andy Gray
CM	N/A	Jamie Thompson
LWB	3	Lee Sharpe
AM	10	Paul Merson
AM	9	Lee Hendrie
CF	13	Paul Walsh
Substitutions:
GK	14	Dave Beasant
Manager
Harry Redknapp

Germany Legends	0-1	England Legends
		Lee Hendrie

Wacker-Arena, Burghausen, Altötting

		England Legends Starting XI:
GK	1	David Seaman
RB	4	Ray Parlour
CB	6	Mark Wright
CB	3	Lee Sharpe
LB	15	Michael Gray
DM	2	Rob Lee
CM	10	Paul Merson	(c)
CM	5	Lee Hendrie
AM	7	Matt Le Tissier
CF	8	Kevin Phillips
CF	9	Teddy Sheringham
Substitutions:
MF	16	Andy Gray
FW	17	Darius Vassell
DF	14	Alan Kennedy
FW	12	Paul Walsh
Subs not used
GK	13	Dave Beasant
Manager:
Harry Redknapp

== Reception ==
The show received generally positive reaction, with many praising the air time given towards players talking about their mental and physical health, notably Paul Merson.

The Daily Telegraph published a 3/5 star review, calling the issues touched on by the programme "rather heartwarming."
