= List of Cardiff City F.C. captains =

Coordinates: 51.472838°N 3.203092°W

This is a list of Cardiff City Football Club's captains, from 1910, when the club appointed their first captain.

Years	Nat.	Name	Notes
1910–1911	Scotland	Davy McDougall	Player-Manager, first club captain
1911–1914	England	Jack Burton	Southern Football League Second Division winning captain
No competitive football took place between 1915 and 1919 due to World War I.
1920–1922	England	Charlie Brittan	First captain in The Football League
1922–1926	Scotland	Jimmy Blair	
1926–1931	Wales	Fred Keenor	1927 FA Cup winning captain
1934–1938	Wales	Arthur Granville	
No competitive football took place between 1939 and 1945 due to World War II.
1946–1949	Wales	Fred Stansfield	Third Division South winning captain
1951–1956	Wales	Alf Sherwood	
1959–1960	Scotland	Danny Malloy	
1961–1962	Wales	Alan Harrington	
1964–1967	England	Gareth Williams	
1967–1974	Scotland	Don Murray	
1974	England	Clive Charles	
1974–1975	Wales	Phil Dwyer	
1975–1976	Wales	Mike England	
1976–1977	Wales	Richie Morgan	Team captain was Doug Livermore.
1977–1980	Wales	Phil Dwyer	
1982–1986	England	Jimmy Mullen	
1985–1986	Scotland	Jake King	
1987–1988	Wales	Terry Boyle	
1988–1989	Wales	Nigel Stevenson	
1989–1990	England	Roger Gibbins	
1991–1993	Northern Ireland	Paul Ramsey	Third Division winning captain
1993–1997	Wales	Jason Perry	
1995–1996	England	Paul Harding	
1997–1998	England	Dave Penney	Lee Jarman was captain whilst Penney was absent.
1998–2001	England	Kevin Nugent	
2001–2005	Republic of Ireland	Graham Kavanagh	
2005–2009	England	Darren Purse	Vice-captain was Stephen McPhail, Joe Ledley team captain (2008–09)
2009–2014	England	Mark Hudson	Championship winning captain Jay Bothroyd was appointed team captain (2009–10) due to long-term injury, 2010–11 team captain was Craig Bellamy
2014–2016	Scotland	David Marshall	
2016–2022	England	Sean Morrison	
2022–2025	England	Joe Ralls	
2025–	England	Calum Chambers	
