= 1990–91 Arsenal F.C. season =

English football club season

Arsenal
1990–91 season
- Chairman: Peter Hill-Wood
- Manager: George Graham
- Stadium: Highbury
- First Division: 1st
- FA Cup: Semi-finals
- League Cup: Fourth round
- Top goalscorer: League: Alan Smith (22); All: Alan Smith (27)
- Highest home attendance: 42,393 vs. Queens Park Rangers (23 April 1991)
- Lowest home attendance: 22,890 vs. Chester City (9 October 1990)
- Average home league attendance: 36,865
| Home colours | Away colours |

The 1990–91 season was Arsenal Football Club's 95th season of competitive football and 65th consecutive season in the top flight of English football, the Football League First Division. Arsenal finished the season as league champions for the second time in three seasons, losing just one of their 38 league games. They reached the semifinals of the FA Cup, losing to Tottenham. Alan Smith was the top scorer in both the league and all competitions, winning the golden boot for the second time.

Arsenal began the season with a 17-game unbeaten streak in all competitions, though it was not without drama. On 20 October, Arsenal faced Manchester United in the league. Although they won 1-0, the match resulted in a brawl after which Arsenal were deducted two points. Arsenal's unbeaten streak in all competitions came to an end with a 6-2 home loss to Manchester United in the League Cup. Arsenal didn't lose in the league until a 2-1 loss to Chelsea, their only loss of the season. Arsenal chased Liverpool for the league title for most of the season before winning the championship with two games to spare after Liverpool lost to Nottingham Forest on May the 6th.

Manager George Graham brought in several important new signings for the season, including goalkeeper David Seaman, winger Anders Limpar, and defender Andy Linighan.

== Season summary ==
The season began with two major signings at Highbury. After more than a year of trying, Arsenal finally landed goalkeeper David Seaman from Queens Park Rangers before the start of the season. Seaman would go on to keep 29 clean sheets in 50 matches. Arsenal's previous first choice goalkeeper John Lukic was sold to newly promoted Leeds United. Swedish winger Anders Limpar was signed from Italian side Cremonese, quickly prompting the departure of two other players in the same position – Brian Marwood and Martin Hayes. Manager George Graham also strengthened his defence with a move for Norwich defender Andy Linighan, although Linighan was not a regular player in his first season at Highbury. Making their debuts this season were midfielder David Hillier and striker Andy Cole. Although Cole made just one appearance for Arsenal this season as a substitute, Hillier played 22 games in all competitions and picked up a league title medal.

The season began with a 3–0 away win over Wimbledon and a 2–1 home win over Luton Town. By the end of October, Arsenal, Liverpool, and Tottenham remained unbeaten in the league. Tottenham later dropped in the standings, leaving Arsenal and Liverpool as the primary contenders for the title for much of the season.

On 20 October, Arsenal travelled to Old Trafford for a league match with Manchester United, which they won 1–0, but the match was marred by a 21-player brawl which resulted in Arsenal being deducted two points and their opponents one point. Both clubs were fined £50,000.

Arsenal's League Cup hopes ended on 28 November when they lost 6–2 at home to Manchester United in the fourth round, ending their 17-game undefeated streak in all competitions. Four days later however, Arsenal beat Liverpool 3–0 in the league at Highbury, ending the visiting side's unbeaten start to the league campaign, although they did not overtake Kenny Dalglish's men and go top of the league until the new year.

On 19 December, the club was stunned when captain Tony Adams was jailed for four months for following a car crash. Adams was released after two months behind bars, during which Arsenal suffered their only league defeat of the season – a 2–1 defeat at Chelsea in their 24th game.

Before the end of the February, the title race was thrown into fresh uncertainty when Kenny Dalglish suddenly announced his resignation as manager of Liverpool, who were the only remaining serious threat to Arsenal's lead of the First Division. Ronnie Moran was placed in temporary charge until the arrival of Graeme Souness two months later, but by then Arsenal were looking all set for the league title.

Arsenal had also been in contention for the double for the FA Cup, which would have made them the only team in English football to have won the double twice, but these hopes ended in the semi-final at Wembley, where they beaten 3–1 by Tottenham, who went on to win the trophy for a then-record eighth time.

Confirmation of Arsenal's league title triumph finally came just before their penultimate game of the season, on 6 May, when Liverpool lost to Nottingham Forest. Later that day, Arsenal triumphed 3–1 at home to Manchester United in a match where top scorer Alan Smith scored a hat-trick. Anders Limpar then scored a hat-trick in Arsenal's final fixture, a 6–1 victory over Coventry City at Highbury.

Throughout the season, Arsenal had lost only one game and conceded just 18 goals in the league. Alan Smith was Arsenal's top scorer and won the golden boot for the second time in three years. The league victory also granted Arsenal entrance to European competition for the 1991/92 season, following the end of the five-year ban of English sides in European competition.

== Pre-season and friendlies ==
| Date | Opponents | Venue | Result | Score F–A | Scorers | Attendance |
|---|---|---|---|---|---|---|
| 9 May 1990 | South Korea | N | W | 2–1 | Smith, Dixon | ? |
| 22 July 1990 | (Sweden) Varbergs BoIS | A | W | 2–0 | Merson, Rocastle | ? |
| 24 July 1990 | (Sweden) Västra Frölunda | A | W | 4–0 | Linighan, Smith, Merson (2) | ? |
| 26 July 1990 | (Sweden) IFK Värnamo | A | D | 2–2 | Merson, Limpar | ? |
| 3 August 1990 | Wolverhampton Wanderers | A | W | 1–0 | Smith | ? |
| 10 August 1990 | Aston Villa | N | W | 2–0 | Limpar, Campbell | ? |
| 11 August 1990 | (Italy) Sampdoria | N | L | 0–1 | | ? |
| 17 August 1990 | Brighton & Hove Albion | A | D | 2–2 | Rocastle, Smith | ? |
| 13 October 1990 | Tottenham Hotspur | H | L | 2–5 | Smith, Merson | 14,806 |
| 27 April 1991 | Liverpool | H | L | 1–3 | Campbell | 18,224 |
| 13 May 1991 | Barnet | A | W | 4–2 | Adams, Campbell, Merson, Groves | 7,724 |
| 17 May 1991 | Liverpool | N | D | 1–1 | Winterburn | 60,000 |

== Football League First Division ==
| Date | Opponents | Venue | Result | Score F–A | Scorers | Attendance | Ref |
|---|---|---|---|---|---|---|---|
| 25 August 1990 | Wimbledon | A | W | 3–0 | Merson 57', Curle 59' (o.g.), Groves 90' | 13,733 | |
| 29 August 1990 | Luton Town | H | W | 2–1 | Merson 37', Thomas 69' | 32,723 | |
| 1 September 1990 | Tottenham Hotspur | H | D | 0–0 | | 40,009 | |
| 8 September 1990 | Everton | A | D | 1–1 | Groves 58' | 29,919 | |
| 15 September 1990 | Chelsea | H | W | 4–1 | Limpar 52', Dixon 58' (pen.), Merson 62', Rocastle 73' | 40,475 | |
| 22 September 1990 | Nottingham Forest | A | W | 2–0 | Limpar 28', Rocastle 83' | 26,013 | |
| 29 September 1990 | Leeds United | A | D | 2–2 | Limpar 39', 50' | 30,085 | |
| 6 October 1990 | Norwich City | H | W | 2–0 | Davis 26', 31' | 36,737 | |
| 20 October 1990 | Manchester United | A | W | 1–0 | Limpar 42' | 47,232 | |
| 27 October 1990 | Sunderland | H | W | 1–0 | Dixon 75' (pen.) | 38,485 | |
| 3 November 1990 | Coventry City | A | W | 2–0 | Limpar 83', 88' | 15,336 | |
| 10 November 1990 | Crystal Palace | A | D | 0–0 | | 28,282 | |
| 17 November 1990 | Southampton | H | W | 4–0 | Merson 21', Limpar 33', Smith 37', 59' | 36,229 | |
| 24 November 1990 | Queens Park Rangers | A | W | 3–1 | Merson 78', Smith 84', Campbell 86' | 18,555 | |
| 2 December 1990 | Liverpool | H | W | 3–0 | Merson 21', Dixon 47' (pen.), Smith 88' | 40,419 | |
| 8 December 1990 | Luton Town | A | D | 1–1 | Smith 44' | 12,506 | |
| 15 December 1990 | Wimbledon | H | D | 2–2 | Merson 31', Adams 35' | 30,164 | |
| 23 December 1990 | Aston Villa | A | D | 0–0 | | 22,687 | |
| 26 December 1990 | Derby County | H | W | 3–0 | Smith 4', 77', Merson 26' | 25,558 | |
| 29 December 1990 | Sheffield United | H | W | 4–1 | Dixon 50' (pen.), Thomas 70', Smith 84', 86' | 37,810 | |
| 1 January 1991 | Manchester City | A | W | 1–0 | Smith 59' | 30,579 | |
| 12 January 1991 | Tottenham Hotspur | A | D | 0–0 | | 34,753 | |
| 19 January 1991 | Everton | H | W | 1–0 | Merson 47' | 35,349 | |
| 2 February 1991 | Chelsea | A | L | 1–2 | Smith 89' | 29,094 | |
| 23 February 1991 | Crystal Palace | H | W | 4–0 | O'Leary 3', Merson 41', Smith 60', Campbell 61' | 42,162 | |
| 3 March 1991 | Liverpool | A | W | 1–0 | Merson 66' | 37,221 | |
| 17 March 1991 | Leeds United | H | W | 2–0 | Campbell 77', 86' | 26,218 | |
| 20 March 1991 | Nottingham Forest | H | D | 1–1 | Campbell 32' | 34,152 | |
| 23 March 1991 | Norwich City | A | D | 0–0 | | 20,131 | |
| 30 March 1991 | Derby County | A | W | 2–0 | Smith 7', 84' | 18,397 | |
| 3 April 1991 | Aston Villa | H | W | 5–0 | Campbell 37', 84', Davis 55', Smith 59', 61' | 41,868 | |
| 6 April 1991 | Sheffield United | A | W | 2–0 | Campbell 10', Smith 73' | 26,920 | |
| 9 April 1991 | Southampton | A | D | 1–1 | Smith 74' | 21,200 | |
| 17 April 1991 | Manchester City | H | D | 2–2 | Campbell 5', Merson 14' | 38,412 | |
| 23 April 1991 | Queens Park Rangers | H | W | 2–0 | Dixon 58' (pen.), Merson 72' | 42,393 | |
| 4 May 1991 | Sunderland | A | D | 0–0 | | 22,606 | |
| 6 May 1991 | Manchester United | H | W | 3–1 | Smith 19', 41, 58' (pen.) | 40,229 | |
| 11 May 1991 | Coventry City | H | W | 6–1 | Peake, 13' (o.g.), Limpar 31', 79', 86', Smith 77', Groves 90' | 41,039 | |

=== Classification ===
| Pos | Team | Pld | W | D | L | GF | GA | GD | Pts | Qualification or relegation |
|---|---|---|---|---|---|---|---|---|---|---|
| 1 | Arsenal (C) | 38 | 24 | 13 | 1 | 74 | 18 | +56 | 83 (Note: Arsenal deducted two points; Manchester United deducted one point due to a brawl in a game between both teams.) | Qualification for the European Cup first round |
| 2 | Liverpool | 38 | 23 | 7 | 8 | 77 | 40 | +37 | 76 | Qualification for the UEFA Cup first round |
| 3 | Crystal Palace | 38 | 20 | 9 | 9 | 50 | 41 | +9 | 69 | |
| 4 | Leeds United | 38 | 19 | 7 | 12 | 65 | 47 | +18 | 64 | |
| 5 | Manchester City | 38 | 17 | 11 | 10 | 64 | 53 | +11 | 62 | |

Source: World Football
Rules for classification: 1) Points; 2) Goal difference; 3) Goals scored
(C) Champions

==== Round by round ====
| Round | 1 | 2 | 3 | 4 | 5 | 6 | 7 | 8 | 9 | 10 | 11 | 12 | 13 | 14 | 15 | 16 | 17 | 18 | 19 | 20 | 21 | 22 | 23 | 24 | 25 | 26 | 27 | 28 | 29 | 30 | 31 | 32 | 33 | 34 | 35 | 36 | 37 | 38 |
|---|---|---|---|---|---|---|---|---|---|---|---|---|---|---|---|---|---|---|---|---|---|---|---|---|---|---|---|---|---|---|---|---|---|---|---|---|---|---|
| Result | W | W | D | D | W | W | D | W | W | W | W | D | W | W | W | D | D | D | W | W | W | D | W | L | W | W | W | D | D | W | W | W | D | D | W | D | W | W |
| Position | 1 | 1 | 3 | 5 | 2 | 2 | 2 | 2 | 2 | 2 | 2 | 2 | 2 | 2 | 2 | 2 | 2 | 2 | 2 | 2 | 2 | 2 | 1 | 1 | 1 | 1 | 1 | 1 | 2 | 1 | 1 | 1 | 1 | 1 | 1 | 1 | 1 | 1 |

W = Win; D = Draw; L = Loss

== Football League Cup ==
Arsenal entered the Football League Cup in the second round, where they were drawn against Chester City in a two-legged tie.

| Round | Date | Opponents | Venue | Result | Score | Scorers | Attendance | Ref |
|---|---|---|---|---|---|---|---|---|
| Second round first leg | 25 September 1990 | Chester City | A | W | 1–0 | Merson 59' | 4,135 | |
| Second round second leg | 9 October 1990 | Chester City | H | W | 5–0 | Groves 10', 26', Smith 41', Adams 67', Merson 83' | 22,902 | |
| Third round | 30 October 1990 | Manchester City | A | W | 2–1 | Groves 50', Adams 64' | 26,825 | |
| Fourth round | 28 November 1990 | Manchester United | H | L | 2–6 | Smith 48', 68' | 40,884 | |

Colour key: Green = Arsenal win; Yellow = draw; Red = opponents win. Arsenal score ordered first.

== FA Cup ==
| Round | Date | Opponents | Venue | Result | Score | Scorers | Attendance | Ref |
|---|---|---|---|---|---|---|---|---|
| Third round | 5 January 1991 | Sunderland | H | W | 2–1 | Smith 18', Limpar 45' | | |
| Fourth round | 27 January 1991 | Leeds United | H | D | 0–0 | | | |
| Fourth round replay | 30 January 1991 | Leeds United | A | D | 1–1 | Limpar 60' | | |
| Fourth round second replay | 13 February 1991 | Leeds United | H | D | 0–0 | | | |
| Fourth round third replay | 16 February 1991 | Leeds United | A | W | 2–1 | Merson 17', Dixon 43' | | |
| Fifth round | 27 February 1991 | Shrewsbury Town | A | W | 1–0 | Thomas 59' | | |
| Sixth round | 9 March 1991 | Cambridge United | H | W | 2–1 | Campbell 19', Adams 61' | | |
| Semi-final | 14 April 1991 | Tottenham Hotspur | N | L | 1–3 | Smith 45' | 77,893 | |

Colour key: Green = Arsenal win; Yellow = draw; Red = opponents win. Arsenal score ordered first.

== Squad statistics ==
Arsenal used a total of 19 players during the 1990–91 season and there were nine different goalscorers. There were also two squad members who did not make a first-team appearance in the campaign. Seaman, Winterburn, Dixon and Bould started in all 38 league matches. The team scored a total of 93 goals in all competitions. The top goalscorer was Smith, with 28 goals – 22 of which were scored in the league.

Key

No. = Squad number

Pos = Playing position

Nat. = Nationality

Apps = Appearances

GK = Goalkeeper

DF = Defender

MF = Midfielder

FW = Forward

Numbers in parentheses denote appearances as substitute. Players with name struck through and marked † left the club during the playing season.

| Pos. | Nat. | Name | League | | FA Cup | | League Cup | | Total | |
| Pos. | Nat. | Name | Apps | Goals | Apps | Goals | Apps | Goals | Apps | Goals |
|---|---|---|---|---|---|---|---|---|---|---|
| GK | (England) | David Seaman | 38 | 0 | 8 | 0 | 4 | 0 | 50 | 0 |
| DF | (England) | Nigel Winterburn | 38 | 0 | 8 | 0 | 4 | 0 | 50 | 0 |
| DF | (England) | Lee Dixon | 38 | 5 | 8 | 1 | 4 | 0 | 50 | 6 |
| DF | (England) | Tony Adams | 30 | 1 | 3 | 1 | 4 | 2 | 37 | 4 |
| DF | (England) | Steve Bould | 38 | 0 | 8 | 0 | 4 | 0 | 50 | 0 |
| DF | (England) | Andy Linighan | 7 (3) | 0 | 3 (1) | 0 | 0 | 0 | 10 (4) | 0 |
| DF | (Republic of Ireland) | David O'Leary | 11 (10) | 1 | 5 (1) | 0 | (1) | 0 | 16 (12) | 1 |
| DF | (England) | Colin Pates | (1) | 0 | 0 | 0 | 0 | 0 | (1) | 0 |
| MF | (England) | David Rocastle | 13 (3) | 2 | (1) | 0 | 2 | 0 | 15 (4) | 2 |
| MF | (England) | David Hillier | 9 (7) | 0 | 3 (1) | 0 | 2 | 0 | 14 (8) | 0 |
| MF | (Sweden) | Anders Limpar | 32 (2) | 11 | 5 | 2 | 2 | 0 | 39 (2) | 13 |
| MF | (England) | Paul Davis | 36 (1) | 3 | 6 (1) | 0 | 4 | 0 | 46 (2) | 3 |
| MF | (England) | Michael Thomas | 27 (4) | 2 | 8 | 1 | 4 | 0 | 37 (4) | 3 |
| MF | (England) | Perry Groves | 13 (19) | 3 | 3 (1) | 0 | 4 | 3 | 20 (20) | 6 |
| MF | (Iceland) | Sigurður Jónsson | 2 | 0 | 0 | 0 | 0 | 0 | 2 | 0 |
| FW | (England) | Paul Merson | 36 (1) | 13 | 8 | 1 | 4 | 2 | 48 (1) | 16 |
| FW | (England) | Alan Smith | 35 (2) | 22 | 8 | 2 | 4 | 3 | 47 (2) | 27 |
| FW | (England) | Kevin Campbell | 15 (7) | 9 | 4 (2) | 1 | (4) | 0 | 19 (13) | 10 |
| FW | (England) | Andy Cole | (1) | 0 | 0 | 0 | 0 | 0 | (1) | 0 |

== See also ==
- 1990–91 in English football
