= Ian Andrews =

English footballer (born 1964)

Personal information
- Full name: Ian Edmund Andrews
- Date of birth: 1 December 1964 (age 61)
- Place of birth: Nottingham, England
- Height: 6 ft 2 in (1.88 m)
- Position: Goalkeeper

Youth career
- Mansfield Town

Senior career*
Years	Team	Apps	(Gls)
1982–1988	Leicester City	126	(0)
1984	→ Swindon Town (loan)	1	(0)
1988–1989	Celtic	5	(0)
1988	→ Leeds United (loan)	1	(0)
1989–1994	Southampton	10	(0)
1994–1996	AFC Bournemouth	64	(0)
1997–2002	Leicester City	0	(0)
Total		207	(0)

International career
1982	England U17	3	(0)
1982–1983	England Youth	6	(0)
1986	England U21	1	(0)
- * Club domestic league appearances and goals

Ian Edmund Andrews (born 1 December 1964, in Nottingham) is an English former footballer who played as a goalkeeper in the Football League for Leicester City, Swindon Town, Leeds United, Southampton and AFC Bournemouth, and in the Scottish Premier Division for Celtic. He was capped by England at under-21 level. His last appearance in the League was for Bournemouth in 1996, but while working for Leicester City as goalkeeping coach and physiotherapist, he was an unused substitute as late as the 2001–02 season. In 2004, he joined TeamBath as physiotherapist.

He is an alumnus of Manchester Metropolitan University

== Career statistics ==
Appearances and goals by club, season and competition
Club	Season	League			FA Cup		League Cup		Other		Total	
Club	Season	Division	Apps	Goals	Apps	Goals	Apps	Goals	Apps	Goals	Apps	Goals
Leicester City
Leicester City	1983–84	First Division	2	0	0	0	0	0	—		2	0
Leicester City	1984–85	First Division	31	0	4	0	1	0	—		36	0
Leicester City	1985–86	First Division	39	0	1	0	2	0	—		42	0
Leicester City	1986–87	First Division	42	0	1	0	3	0	—		46	0
Leicester City	1987–88	Second Division	12	0	1	0	0	0	—		13	0
Leicester City	Total		126	0	7	0	6	0	0	0	139	0
Swindon Town (loan)	1983–84	Fourth Division	1	0	0	0	0	0	—		1	0
Celtic	1988–89	Scottish Premier Division	5	0	0	0	2	0	1 (Note: Appearances in UEFA Champions League)	0	8	0
Leeds United (loan)	1988–89	Second Division	1	0	0	0	0	0	—		1	0
Southampton
Southampton	1989-90	First Division	3	0	0	0	0	0	—		3	0
Southampton	1990-91	First Division	1	0	0	0	0	0	1 (Note: Appearances in Full Members' Cup)	0	2	0
Southampton	1991-92	First Division	1	0	0	0	0	0	—		1	0
Southampton	1992-93	Premier League	0	0	0	0	0	0	—		0	0
Southampton	1993–94	Premier League	5	0	0	0	0	0	—		5	0
Southampton	Total		10	0	0	0	0	0	1	0	11	0
Bournemouth
Bournemouth	1994–95	Second Division	38	0	2	0	3	0	2 (Note: Appearances in EFL Trophy)	0	45	0
Bournemouth	1995–96	Second Division	26	0	0	0	4	0	1	0	31	0
Bournemouth	Total		64	0	2	0	7	0	3	0	76	0
Career total			207	0	9	0	15	0	5	0	236	0
