= 1899–1900 Scottish Division Two =

Scottish Division Two
- Season: 1899–1900
- Champions: Partick Thistle
- Promoted: Partick Thistle and Morton

The 1899–1900 Scottish Division Two was won by Partick Thistle with Linthouse finishing bottom.

== Table ==
Pos	Team	Pld	W	D	L	GF	GA	GD	Pts	Promotion or relegation
1	Partick Thistle (C, P)	18	14	1	3	55	26	+29	29	Promoted to the 1900–01 Scottish Division One
2	Morton (P)	18	14	0	4	66	25	+41	28	Promoted to the 1900–01 Scottish Division One
3	Port Glasgow Athletic	18	10	0	8	50	41	+9	20	
4	Leith Athletic	18	9	1	8	32	37	−5	19	
4	Motherwell	18	9	1	8	38	36	+2	19	
6	Abercorn	18	7	2	9	46	39	+7	16	
7	Hamilton Academical	18	7	1	10	33	45	−12	15	
8	Ayr	18	6	2	10	39	48	−9	14	
9	Airdrieonians	18	4	3	11	27	49	−22	11	
10	Linthouse (R)	18	2	5	11	28	68	−40	9	Failed re-election (Note: Linthouse failed re-election to compete in the next season and were replaced by East Stirlingshire.)

Source: statto.com
Rules for classification: Teams finish equal if level on points. Points system: 2 points for a win, 1 point for a draw, 0 points for a loss
(C) Champions; (P) Promoted; (R) Relegated
