= Alan Smith (footballer, born 1962) =

English footballer (born 1962)

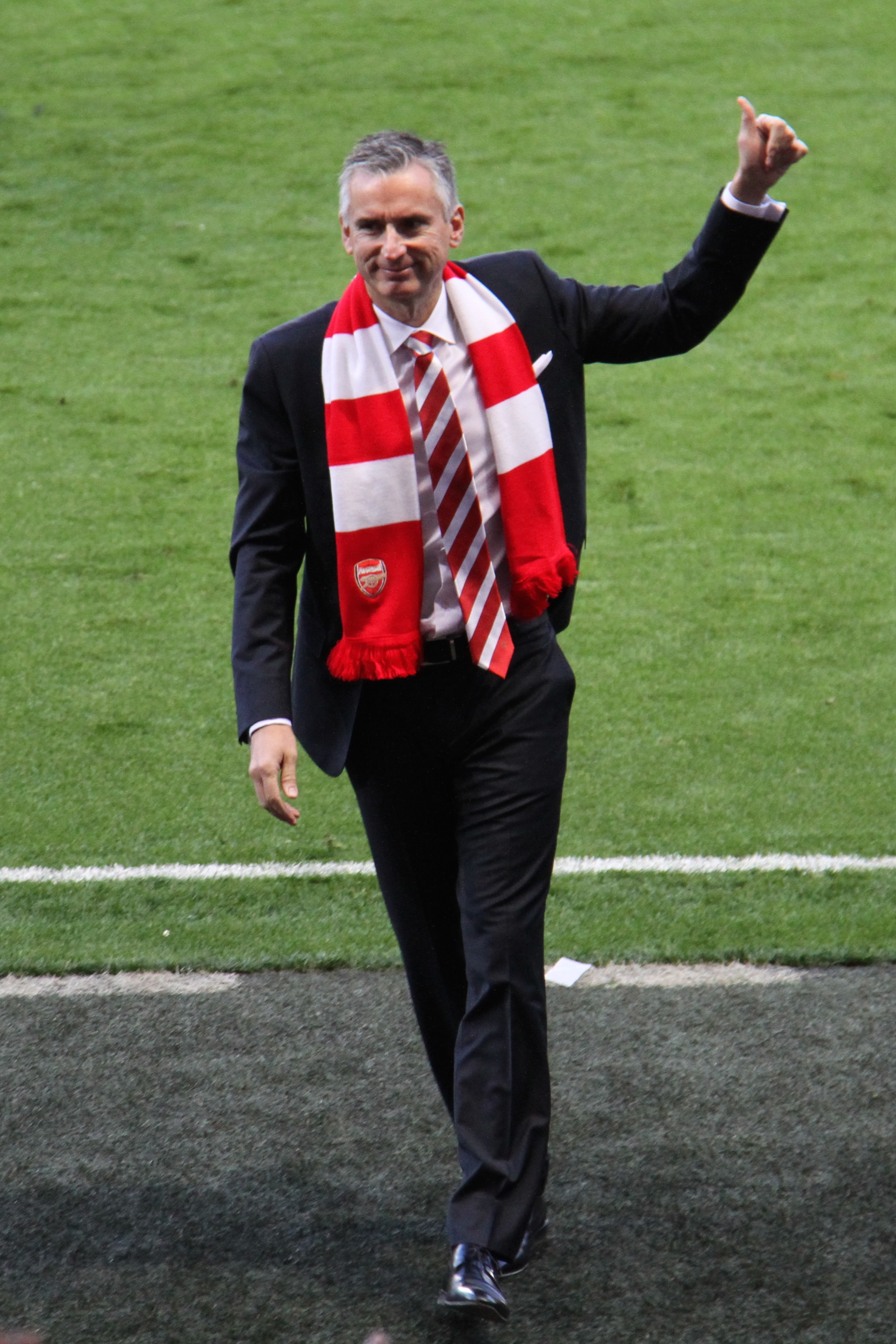
- Smith in 2014

Personal information
- Full name: Alan Martin Smith
- Date of birth: 21 November 1962 (age 63)
- Place of birth: Hollywood, Worcestershire, England
- Height: 6 ft 3 in (1.91 m)
- Position: Striker

Senior career*
Years	Team	Apps	(Gls)
1981–1982	Alvechurch		
1982–1987	Leicester City	200	(76)
1987–1995	Arsenal	264	(86)
Total		464	(162)

International career
1982	England C	3	(0)
1988–1992	England	13	(2)
1990–1992	England B	4	(4)
- * Club domestic league appearances and goals

Alan Martin Smith (born 21 November 1962) is an English football commentator and former player who played as a striker. He played for Leicester City and Arsenal in a career that spanned over a decade. A co-commentator for Sky Sports, Smith has also provided his voice to the football video game series FIFA alongside Martin Tyler from 2011 until 2019.

Smith was Arsenal's top scorer for four consecutive seasons, and scored the first goal in Arsenal's 2–0 victory at Anfield 26 May 1989 which saw them lift that season's league championship. Smith then won another league title with Arsenal in 1991 as well as a League Cup and FA Cup Double two years later. He also struck the sole goal in Arsenal's 1994 European Cup Winners' Cup final victory against Parma.

Smith was capped 13 times for the England national team and represented the nation at UEFA Euro 1992.

He has been writing for The Daily Telegraph and Evening Standard, and released his autobiography Heads Up: My Life Story in 2018.

== Club career ==
=== Leicester City ===
Smith started his career at non-league Alvechurch in north-east Worcestershire, where he could combine football with studying for a degree in modern languages, his subjects being French, German and Spanish, at Coventry Polytechnic.

He then signed professional forms with Leicester City in June 1982. In his first season, he scored 13 goals in partnership with Gary Lineker, as the Foxes won promotion to the First Division. He spent five seasons at Leicester, scoring 84 goals in 217 appearances. In Smith's final season with the club they were relegated and he signed for Arsenal for £850,000 in March 1987, but was then loaned back to Leicester for the rest of the season.

=== Arsenal ===
Smith was one of George Graham's first major signings, and despite a hat-trick on 29 August 1987 against Portsmouth at Highbury, Smith endured a difficult start to his Arsenal career, at one point going a full two months without scoring. But Smith would prove his worth in the long term, and topped their scoring charts in four of his first five seasons. The purchase of winger Brian Marwood in March 1988 proved to be a significant turning point for Smith and Arsenal, Marwood being the most frequent supplier of his goals. The first season ended with a Littlewoods Cup final appearance at Wembley where he scored in a 3–2 defeat by Luton.

The following season Smith won his first Golden Boot with 23 goals from 36 League games, the most important being the first goal in Arsenal's 2–0 victory at Anfield on 26 May 1989 which saw them lift that season's league championship. 1989–90 was a disappointing season both for the club and for Alan Smith goals wise. He only scored 13 goals in all competitions.

Smith was top scorer again when Arsenal claimed the title in 1990–91 and won his second Golden Boot. The league winning side were deducted two points for a brawl against Manchester United, still won the league losing only one game.

But then the goals dried up for Smith, and he battled with Kevin Campbell for the position alongside Ian Wright. He was an unused substitute in the League Cup triumph 1993 against Sheffield Wednesday after scoring twice in the 3–1 semi-final first leg at Crystal Palace. But he played in the FA Cup success 1993, also against Sheffield Wednesday, when he was booked for the first and only time in his career. Smith never scored a more important or perfectly struck goal than the one in the 1994 European Cup Winners' Cup final, his left-foot shot in Copenhagen stunned Parma.

His last goal for Arsenal came against Manchester City 12 December 1994 in a 2–1 win at Maine Road, and his last appearance for Arsenal came in the FA Cup third round, 7 January 1995 in a goalless draw against Millwall at The Den. A knee injury forced him to retire aged 32. Several clubs, including Watford, had expressed an interest in signing Smith just before he announced an end to his playing days in July 1995.

Smith scored 115 goals for Arsenal. Smith has been ranked at 27th within the club's listing of the 50 greatest Gunners of all time.

== International career ==
Smith gained his first full England cap against Saudi Arabia 16 November 1988. Steve Bull, then of Second Division side Wolverhampton Wanderers, was selected by Sir Bobby Robson for 1990 FIFA World Cup. Smith had just scored ten goals in 38 games to help Arsenal finish fourth in Division One, but Bull's 24 goals in 42 games in the Second Division caught Robson's eye and Smith was omitted in favour of Bull.

When Graham Taylor took over, Smith returned to the national team and his first goal came in a Friendly match against Soviet Union at Wembley 21 May 1991. His second goal came against Turkey in the Euro 1992 qualifying group match at Wembley, 16 October 1991, in a 1–0 win. The last of his 13 caps came when he replaced Gary Lineker in the 2–1 defeat by Sweden in the UEFA Euro 1992.

== Media career ==
Smith is currently a regular co-commentator and occasional studio pundit for Sky Sports for the Premier League coverage. In 2011, he commentated on the Champions League final alongside Martin Tyler for the English–language world feed commentary and then in 2015, he became the regular co-commentator for the Champions League competition proper with Tyler except the final. In 2022, he commentated on FIFA World Cup 2022 final alongside Peter Drury for the English-language world feed commentary.

On 30 June 2011, EA Sports announced that Smith would replace Andy Gray as Martin Tyler's partner in commentating in FIFA 12. The pair commentated on the games up until FIFA 20 but they were both cut from the games for FIFA 21. Smith said on Twitter "Yes, gutted not to be involved with @EASPORTSFIFA anymore. For Martin Tyler and myself, it was an honour to voice the game for so long. But nothing lasts forever."

== Style of play ==
Tall and slim, Alan Smith was well known for his headers, but during his career he demonstrated all round skills, including a deft first touch and the ability to chest the ball down or head it on for teammates to run onto. Though primarily left-footed, he scored a number of goals with his right foot. He was also known for his hold-up play.

He scored in a number of important games for Arsenal, including the 1994 European Cup Winners' Cup final and scored one goal in Arsenal's decisive victory at Anfield in 1989. Former Arsenal marksman Olivier Giroud has been compared to Smith.

== Career statistics ==
=== Club ===
Appearances and goals by club, season and competition
Season	Club	League			FA Cup		League Cup		Europe		Other		Total	
Season	Club	Division	Apps	Goals	Apps	Goals	Apps	Goals	Apps	Goals	Apps	Goals	Apps	Goals
Leicester City	1982–83	Second Division	39	13	1	1	1	0	—		—		41	14
Leicester City	1983–84	First Division	40	15	1	0	2	1	—		—		43	16
Leicester City	1984–85	First Division	39	12	4	2	2	1	—		—		45	15
Leicester City	1985–86	First Division	40	19	1	0	1	0	—		—		42	19
Leicester City	1986–87	First Division	42	17	1	1	3	2	—		—		46	20
Leicester City	Total		200	76	8	4	9	4	—		—		217	84
Arsenal	1987–88	First Division	39	11	3	1	8	4	—		—		50	16
Arsenal	1988–89	First Division	36	23	2	0	5	2	—		3 (Note: Appearances in Football League Centenary Trophy)	0	46	25
Arsenal	1989–90	First Division	38	10	2	0	4	3	—		—		44	13
Arsenal	1990–91	First Division	37	22	8	2	4	3	—		—		49	27
Arsenal	1991–92	First Division	39	12	1	1	2	0	4 (Note: Appearance in European Cup)	4	1 (Note: Appearance in FA Charity Shield)	0	47	17
Arsenal	1992–93	Premier League	31	3	7	1	7	2	—		—		45	6
Arsenal	1993–94	Premier League	25	3	2	1	5	1	9 (Note: Appearances in European Cup Winners' Cup)	2	0	0	41	7
Arsenal	1994–95	Premier League	19	2	1	0	3	1	4	1	0	0	27	4
Arsenal	Total		264	86	26	6	38	16	17	7	4	0	349	115
Career total			464	162	34	10	47	20	17	7	4	0	566	199

=== International ===
Appearances and goals by national team and year
National team	Year	Apps	Goals
England	1988	1	0
England	1989	3	0
England	1991	6	2
England	1992	3	0
Total		13	2

Scores and results list Englands's goal tally first, score column indicates score after each Smith goal

List of international goals scored by Alan Smith
No.	Date	Venue	Opponent	Score	Result	Competition
1	21 May 1991	Wembley Stadium, London, United Kingdom	Soviet Union	1–1	3–1	Friendly
2	16 October 1991	Wembley Stadium, London, United Kingdom	Turkey	1–0	1–0	UEFA Euro 1992 qualifying

== Honours ==
Arsenal

- Football League First Division: 1988–89, 1990–91
- FA Cup: 1992–93
- Football League Cup: 1992–93; runner-up: 1987–88
- FA Charity Shield: 1991 (shared)
- European Cup Winners Cup: 1993–94
- Football League Centenary Trophy: 1988

Individual

- PFA Team of the Year: 1988–89 Football League First Division
- Arsenal Player of the Season: 1988−89
- First Division Golden Boot: 1988–89, 1990–91
