= Tommy English (footballer) =

English footballer

Personal information
- Full name: Thomas Steven English
- Date of birth: 18 October 1961 (age 65)
- Place of birth: Cirencester, England
- Height: 5 ft 9 in (1.75 m)
- Position: Forward

Youth career
- Coventry City

Senior career*
Years	Team	Apps	(Gls)
1979–1982	Coventry City	66	(17)
1982–1984	Leicester City	44	(3)
1984	Rochdale	3	(1)
1984	Plymouth Argyle	4	(1)
1985	Colchester United	1	(0)
1985	Canberra City	20	(5)
1985–1987	Colchester United	43	(17)
1987–1988	Wealdstone	28	(10)
1988–1989	Bishop's Stortford		
1989–1990	Colchester United	13	(3)
1990–1991	Happy Valley		
1991–	Crawley Town		
	Wivenhoe Town	10	(3)
1994–	Cornard United		
- Sudbury Town
–1999	Harwich & Parkeston		

International career
1979–1980	England Youth	6	(1)
- * Club domestic league appearances and goals

Thomas Steven English (born 18 October 1961) is an English former professional footballer, most notably for Coventry City, Leicester City and Colchester United. Between 1979 and 1990 he made 174 appearances in the Football League, scoring 42 league goals.

== Biography ==
English was born in Cirencester, Gloucestershire and attended school in Colchester, Essex. He began his career as an apprentice at Coventry City. After making 66 league appearances for Coventry, scoring seventeen times, he signed for Leicester City in 1982. After being released in 1984, he made a handful of appearances for Rochdale and Plymouth Argyle as a non-contract player, before signing for Colchester United in 1985. After playing a single game for Colchester he signed for Australian club Canberra City where he was the club's joint top scorer in his only season before returning to Colchester in November.

He left Colchester in 1987 and played for non-League clubs Wealdstone and Bishop's Stortford, before returning to Colchester for a third time in 1989. In 1990, he signed for Hong Kong club Happy Valley, before returning to England to play for Crawley Town, Wivenhoe Town, Sudbury Town and Harwich & Parkeston before retiring in 1999.

His son, Tom, played for the youth teams at Norwich City and Arsenal, and professionally in Singapore for one season.
