= John O'Neill (footballer, born 1958) =

Northern Irish footballer

Personal information
- Full name: John Patrick O'Neill
- Date of birth: 11 March 1958 (age 68)
- Place of birth: Derry, Northern Ireland
- Position: Defender

Senior career*
Years	Team	Apps	(Gls)
1977–1987	Leicester City	313	(10)
1987	Queen's Park Rangers	2	(0)
1987–1988	Norwich City	1	(0)
Total		316	(10)

International career
1980–1986	Northern Ireland	39	(2)
- * Club domestic league appearances and goals

John Patrick O'Neill (born 11 March 1958) is a former footballer who played for the Northern Ireland national team, winning 39 caps, and scoring two goals. Born in Derry, Northern Ireland, he was a member of the Northern Ireland squads that played in the World Cup tournaments of 1982 and 1986. His final appearance for the national side came in their 3–0 defeat against Brazil in the 1986 tournament.

== Club career ==
At club level, O'Neill played for Leicester City, QPR, and Norwich City. However, his spell with the Canaries was cut short, and he made just one appearance for Norwich - against Wimbledon in 1987. On the field for just 34 minutes, a horrendous tackle from Dons player John Fashanu so severely damaged O'Neill's knee ligaments that he never played another professional game, and finished his playing career. O'Neill began legal proceedings against Fashanu for the tackle that ended his career, before settling out of court for £70,000.

He was granted a testimonial at Carrow Road by Norwich in the 1988–89 season.

== Management and administration ==
After his playing career ended, O'Neill had a spell from 1990 managing Finn Harps of the League of Ireland. He later moved back to his home city and became a member of the board of Derry City for a period.

== Media work ==
Since retirement as a player, O'Neill is best known for being Jackie Fullerton's co-commentator on Northern Ireland international games.

== International goals ==
Scores and results list Northern Ireland's goal tally first

Goal	Date	Venue	Opponent	Score	Result	Competition
1.	11 June 1980	Sydney Cricket Ground, Sydney	Australia	2–0	2–1	International friendly
2.	14 November 1984	Windsor Park, Belfast	Finland	1–1	2–1	1986 World Cup qualifier
