= Ian Banks (footballer) =

English footballer (born 1961)

Personal information
- Full name: Ian Frederick Banks
- Date of birth: 9 January 1961 (age 65)
- Place of birth: Mexborough, England
- Height: 5 ft 11 in (1.80 m)
- Position: Midfielder

Senior career*
Years	Team	Apps	(Gls)
1978–1983	Barnsley	164	(37)
1983–1987	Leicester City	93	(14)
1986–1988	Huddersfield Town	78	(17)
1988–1989	Bradford City	30	(3)
1988–1989	West Bromwich Albion	4	(0)
1989–1992	Barnsley	96	(7)
1992–1994	Rotherham United	76	(8)
1994–1995	Darlington	39	(1)
1995–1999	Emley	?	(?)
2010	A.F.C. Emley	0	(0)

Managerial career
- 2003: Wakefield and Emley
- 2008–2010: AFC Emley
- 2010: Eccleshill United
- * Club domestic league appearances and goals

Ian Frederick Banks (born 9 January 1961) is an English former professional footballer who played for Barnsley, Leicester City, Huddersfield Town, Bradford City, West Bromwich Albion, Rotherham United, Darlington and Emley. He has also been a coach including at Chesterfield and former club Bradford City, both alongside Nicky Law.

Banks was the manager of AFC Emley during the 2008–09 and 2009–10 seasons becoming the first person to be manager of the previous Emley and the current Emley.

His son, Ollie Banks, is also a professional footballer.
