= Rob Kelly =

British footballer (born 1964)

Personal information
- Full name: Robert Anthony Kelly
- Date of birth: 21 December 1964 (age 61)
- Place of birth: Birmingham, England
- Height: 5 ft 9 in (1.75 m)
- Position: Midfielder

Team information
- Current team: Bolton Wanderers (assistant coach)

Youth career
- 1981–1984: Leicester City

Senior career*
Years	Team	Apps	(Gls)
1984–1986	Leicester City	24	(1)
1984–1985	→ Tranmere Rovers (loan)	5	(2)
1986–1989	Wolverhampton Wanderers	16	(2)
1989	Burton Albion		
Total		45	(5)

Managerial career
- 2006–2007: Leicester City
- 2007: Preston North End (caretaker)
- 2009–2010: Preston North End (caretaker)
- 2011: Sheffield Wednesday (caretaker)
- 2011: Nottingham Forest (caretaker)
- 2012: Nottingham Forest (caretaker)
- 2013: Nottingham Forest (caretaker)
- 2020: Barrow (caretaker)
- 2021: Barrow (caretaker)
- 2022: Wigan Athletic (caretaker)
- * Club domestic league appearances and goals

Robert Anthony Kelly (born 21 December 1964) is an English former footballer and manager. He is currently assistant coach at EFL Championship side Bolton Wanderers.

He is best known for his spell as manager of Leicester City, as well as being assistant manager at several clubs, he has also been a caretaker manager at Preston North End, Sheffield Wednesday, Nottingham Forest and West Bromwich Albion.

== Playing career ==
Kelly began his career at Leicester City, making his debut as a 19-year-old in a home game against Sunderland at the end of the 1983/84 season. He also had a brief loan spell at Tranmere Rovers. After making 18 starts for the Foxes (plus nine substitute appearances) and scoring one goal, he joined Wolverhampton Wanderers in 1986.

As a youngster, he also received a call up to represent Ireland at youth level.

== Coaching career ==
In 1989, Kelly was forced to retire aged just 24 after sustaining a back injury, and initially took the job of youth team coach at Wolverhampton Wanderers. He then trained as a journalist at the Wolverhampton Express & Star, before returning to football again, first back in the Wolverhampton Wanderers coaching set-up. He then moved to Watford as youth team coach, Blackburn Rovers as Academy Director, and then Leicester City.

=== Leicester City manager ===
After the sacking of Leicester manager Craig Levein, following 18 months in charge, Kelly stepped up from his assistant manager role to take control on a caretaker basis.

In his first ten games in charge his team took 21 points from a possible 30, steering the side up the Championship table and away from the threat of relegation to League One. He was awarded the Championship Manager of the Month award for March 2006. This followed wins over relegation rivals Hull City and Millwall, as well as victory against Luton Town and a creditable draw against Premiership-bound Reading. In recognition of his achievements, on 14 April 2006 he signed a one-year rolling contract, confirming his status as manager.

On 11 April 2007 Kelly was sacked due to a poor run of results, his final game being a 3–0 defeat away to Plymouth Argyle. He was replaced by Nigel Worthington until the end of the season.

=== Preston North End ===
In May 2007 he joined Preston North End as part of the club's coaching staff. After the sacking of manager Paul Simpson. The club appointed Alan Irvine as the Club's new manager on 20 November 2007, with Kelly his assistant. In the season 2008/2009, Preston with Irvine and Kelly reached the Championship Play-Off's. Narrowly missing out on a place in the final, losing 2-1 on aggregate to Sheffield United.

Kelly acted as caretaker manager following the departure of Alan Irvine in December 2009, a 7–0 FA Cup win over Colchester being his only game in charge. He left the club following the appointment of Darren Ferguson as manager.

=== Sheffield Wednesday ===
Kelly re-united with Alan Irvine at Sheffield Wednesday, once more as assistant manager. After Irvine left the Owls in February 2011, Kelly also departed after Gary Megson was appointed as manager and made changes to the coaching staff.

=== Nottingham Forest ===
Kelly joined Nottingham Forest as assistant manager to Steve McClaren's backroom team in the summer of 2011, with Jimmy Floyd Hasselbaink the club's First Team Coach. When McClaren resigned on 2 October after a dispute with the club's board, Steve Cotterill was appointed the club's new manager on 14 October with Kelly remaining as Forest's assistant manager.

He was placed 'temporarily in charge of first team affairs' during the pre season of the 2012/13 campaign after the sacking of Steve Cotterill by the club's new owners. Following the subsequent appointment of Sean O'Driscoll, Kelly again reverted to the role of assistant manager.

He remained assistant manager when O'Driscoll was in turn sacked in December 2012 and replaced by Alex McLeish, only to find himself as caretaker manager yet again just six weeks later when McLeish resigned. Billy Davies was announced as the club's new manager on 7 February, though it was also announced that Kelly would remain in his role at the club.

=== West Brom ===
During the summer of 2014, Alan Irvine was appointed the manager of West Brom, again hiring Kelly as his assistant manager. On 29 December 2014, Kelly took over the team alongside coaches Keith Downing and Dean Kiely after Irvine's dismissal. on 1 January 2015, they drew 1–1 away at West Ham United. and then recorded a 7–0 victory against Gateshead in the FA Cup on 3 January 2015, following the appointment of Tony Pulis as Head Coach.

On 5 January, Kelly, Kiely and Downing all departed the club, with Pulis wanting to reshape his own backroom team.

=== Return to assistant ===
On 3 June 2015, he was appointed as Assistant Head Coach to Uwe Rosler at Leeds United. In December 2015, Kelly agreed to become first team coach and link up again with Alan Irvine alongside Paul Lambert at Blackburn Rovers. After they successfully guided the club to Championship safety, all three coaches left Rovers in the summer of 2016 before the start of the following season.

Kelly once again joined up with Rösler at Fleetwood Town in 2016 and left in the summer of 2018. Kelly was appointed assistant manager to Ryan Lowe at Football League Two side Bury on 10 July 2018, as the club targeted an immediate return to League One.

On 1 January 2019 Kelly was announced as assistant coach to Rösler at Sweden's Malmö FF. On 7 February 2020 he followed Rösler to Fortuna Düsseldorf.

=== Barrow ===
On 4 September 2020 Kelly was appointed as assistant manager to David Dunn at League Two side Barrow. Following the sacking of Dunn on 13 December, he was appointed as caretaker manager, leading the club to victories over Cheltenham Town and Port Vale. With the appointment of new manager Michael Jolley, he returned to his role as assistant manager for Barrow's game with Tranmere Rovers on 29 December.

On 21 February 2021, Barrow parted company with Jolley and Kelly was once again named as caretaker manager, this time until the end of the season. During his second stint as caretaker manager, he presided over an upturn of form and on 27 April, with two matches remaining, Barrow secured their Football League status for the following season with a 2–0 win at Forest Green Rovers. He turned down the job on a permanent basis and on 26 May he left the club.

=== Wigan Athletic ===
On 25 June 2021, Kelly joined Wigan Athletic as assistant manager. The following season they were promoted to The Championship as champions of League 1.

=== AGF Aarhus ===
In June 2024, Kelly re-united once again with Uwe Rösler, joining Danish Superliga club AGF.

=== Return to Barrow ===
In September 2025, Kelly returned to Barrow as assistant manager.

=== Reading ===
On 3 November 2025, it was announced that Kelly would re-unite with Leam Richardson at EFL League One club Reading for the first time since their spell together at Wigan Athletic to become their Assistant First-Team Manager alongside Danny Schofield, James Beattie and Mikele Leigertwood.

On 29 June 2026, Kelly left Reading due to personal reasons.

=== Bolton Wanderers ===
On 13 July 2026, he joined the coaching staff at EFL Championship side Bolton Wanderers as assistant coach.. He had previously worked alongside head coach Steven Schumacher and assistant coach Mark Hughes whilst at Bury.
