= Paul Ramsey (footballer) =

Northern Irish footballer

Personal information
- Full name: Paul Christopher Ramsey
- Date of birth: 3 September 1962 (age 64)
- Place of birth: Derry, Northern Ireland
- Height: 5 ft 11 in (1.80 m)
- Position: Midfielder

Senior career*
Years	Team	Apps	(Gls)
1980–1991	Leicester City	322	(13)
1991–1993	Cardiff City	69	(7)
1993–1995	St Johnstone	22	(0)
1994	Cardiff City (loan)	11	(0)
1995	Barry Town	3	(0)
1995–1996	Torquay United	18	(0)
1997–1998	KPV	27	(0)
Total		472	(20)

International career
1983–1989	Northern Ireland	14	(0)
- * Club domestic league appearances and goals

Paul Christopher Ramsey (born 3 September 1962 in Derry, Northern Ireland) is a former professional footballer and Northern Ireland international who played in a defensive midfield role. He featured for Northern Ireland in the 1986 FIFA World Cup.

== Career ==
Ramsey, who measured 5' 10" in height, began his playing career at Derry City He later went on to play for Leicester City and made 14 international appearances for Northern Ireland between 1983 and 1989, as well as being chosen for the country's 1986 World Cup squad. In his younger days, he had won 4 schoolboy caps.

Ramsey moved to Cardiff City in August 1991, where he was appointed captain. During his last season at Cardiff, they managed to win the Third Division title.

Other former clubs of Ramsey's include St Johnstone, Telford United, Torqauy United, Merthyr Tydfil, KPV, Rothwell Town, Grantham Town and King's Lynn.

== Honours ==
Cardiff City

- Football League Third Division: 1992–93

Sporting positions
Preceded by Unknown	Cardiff City captain 1991-1993	Succeeded by Jason Perry
