= Godwin Adeyi Robinson =

Anglican bishop in Nigeria

Godwin Adeyi Robinson is the Anglican Bishop of Lafia in Abuja Province of the Church of Nigeria.

He took office as Bishop in 2017, taking over from Miller Maza.
