= Kwashi =

Kwashi is a surname. Notable people with this surname include:

- Benjamin Kwashi (born 1955), Nigerian archbishop
- Jacob Kwashi, Nigerian bishop
- Tostao Kwashi (born 1979), Zimbabwean football manager

== See also ==
- Quarshie, another surname
