= Yakubu (footballer) =

Nigerian footballer (born 1982)

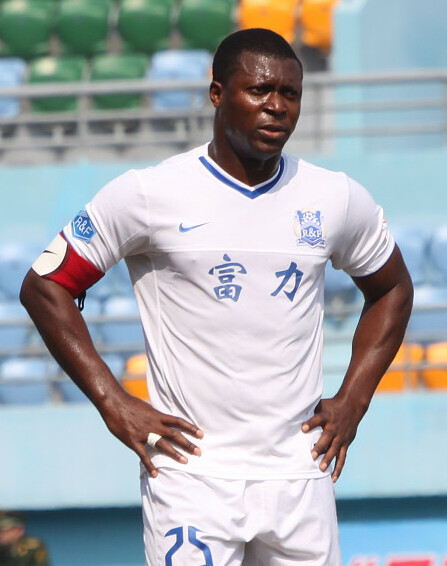
- Yakubu with Guangzhou R&F in 2013

Personal information
- Full name: Yakubu Ayegbeni
- Date of birth: 22 November 1982 (age 43)
- Place of birth: Benin City, Nigeria
- Height: 1.83 m (6 ft 0 in)
- Position: Striker

Youth career
- 1994–1997: Gateway

Senior career*
Years	Team	Apps	(Gls)
1998–1999	Julius Berger		
1999–2003	Maccabi Haifa	49	(38)
1999–2000	→ Hapoel Kfar Saba (loan)	23	(6)
2003	→ Portsmouth (loan)	14	(7)
2003–2005	Portsmouth	67	(28)
2005–2007	Middlesbrough	73	(25)
2007–2011	Everton	82	(25)
2011	→ Leicester City (loan)	20	(11)
2011–2012	Blackburn Rovers	30	(17)
2012–2013	Guangzhou R&F	43	(24)
2014–2015	Al-Rayyan	10	(5)
2015	Reading	7	(0)
2015–2016	Kayserispor	12	(0)
2017	Coventry City	3	(0)
Total		424	(170)

International career
2000–2012	Nigeria	58	(21)
- * Club domestic league appearances and goals

Yakubu Ayegbeni (born 22 November 1982), known mononymously as Yakubu, is a Nigerian football agent and former professional footballer who played as a striker. He is nicknamed "The Yak".

His performances in the 2002–03 UEFA Champions League for Maccabi Haifa earned a loan move to English club Portsmouth which became permanent as they were promoted to the Premier League in 2003. He has since appeared in over 250 Premier League matches for Portsmouth, Middlesbrough, Everton, and Blackburn Rovers, and is the fourth highest African goalscorer in Premier League history with 96 goals. He is the fourth highest scorer in the history of the Nigeria national football team, and represented them at four African Cup of Nations finals, the 2010 FIFA World Cup and the 2000 Summer Olympics.

== Club career ==
=== Early career ===
Yakubu was born in Benin City, Edo State. He started his career with Julius Berger in Lagos as a teenager in the Nigerian Premier League.

=== Maccabi Haifa ===
Israeli side Maccabi Haifa paid Julius Berger $300,000 for his signature. Yakubu's highest scoring season at Haifa was 2001–02, when he scored 13 times in 22 games (League season was 33 matches). He came to England and trained with Derby County but could not obtain a work permit at the time. He scored seven goals in eight European Cup appearances in the 2002–03 UEFA Champions League, (including a hat-trick against Olympiakos and a penalty in the 3–0 win over Manchester United).

=== Portsmouth ===
Yakubu moved to English club Portsmouth of the First Division (now the Championship) on loan on 6 January 2003. Signed by Harry Redknapp, Yakubu helped Portsmouth win the 2002–03 First Division title, scoring at a rate of one goal in every two games (7 in 14 matches). He made his debut as a 57th-minute substitute for Vincent Péricard in a 1–1 away match versus Brighton & Hove Albion on 18 January. On 1 February he started for the first time and scored after 4 minutes at home to Grimsby Town. The match ended 3–0 with Yakubu substituted for Péricard after 89 minutes. Seven days later, Yakubu scored a goal in each half of a 6–2 victory over Derby County for his first brace in English football. He gained his second brace of the season with two first-half goals in a 5–0 away victory at Millwall on 1 March.

Yakubu made his loan spell at Portsmouth permanent in May 2003 for a fee of £4 million. He played 37 of Portsmouth's 38 Premier League matches in 2003–04, starting all but two. Yakubu's 16 goals made him the club's leading goal-scorer, and joint-sixth highest scorer in the entire league.

Yakubu scored his first Premier League goal in his second match, opening a 1–1 draw versus Manchester City on 23 August 2003. After eight consecutive league matches without a goal, he scored a brace in a League Cup match away to Nottingham Forest on 29 October, one of which was in extra time of the 4–2 win. Yakubu scored the final goal of a 6–1 home win over Leeds United on 8 November. On 3 January 2004, he scored an 89th-minute winner in the FA Cup third round match at home to Blackpool. Three days later he scored an equaliser in the Premier League as Portsmouth lost 2–1 away to Aston Villa. On 10 January he scored his first Premier League brace with two goals in the second half of a 4–2 home win over Manchester City. He played at the 2004 African Cup of Nations.

Yakubu ended the season with 11 goals in his last 10 Premier League matches, starting with one each in four straight games, the first being the only goal in the South Coast derby versus Southampton on 21 March. This was followed by a late winner against Blackburn Rovers in a 2–1 away victory, and an equaliser away to Charlton Athletic. On the final day of the season, he scored four goals as Portsmouth defeated Middlesbrough 5–1.

In the 2004–05 season he scored 13 goals. His final goal for Portsmouth in May 2005 before he left the club – the equaliser in a 1–1 home draw to Bolton Wanderers in the penultimate league game of the season – was the goal that ensured Portsmouth would not be relegated from Premiership in the 2004–05 season.

Yakubu's 28 Premier League goals between his two seasons make him Portsmouth's highest ever scorer in the Premier League, with nine more than their second-highest scorer Benjani Mwaruwari.

=== Middlesbrough ===
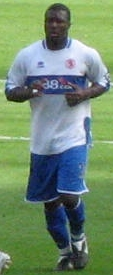
Yakubu playing for Middlesbrough in 2006

After the 2004–05 season, he transferred from Portsmouth to Middlesbrough for a £7.5 million record fee, the highest for a Nigerian ever. Yakubu scored the only goal of the game with a penalty in the first leg of the UEFA Cup last 16 round at home against Roma, giving Middlesbrough a 1–0 victory, who later went through on away goals. His performances were rewarded, as he helped Middlesbrough reach the 2006 UEFA Cup Final against Sevilla, in which they lost 4–0.

His transfer from Portsmouth to Middlesbrough in July 2005 is one of those about which the Stevens inquiry report in June 2007 expressed concerns because of the lack of co-operation from agents Pinhas Zahavi and Barry Silkman.

=== Everton ===
Yakubu was transferred to Everton in August 2007 for a fee of £11.25 million on a five-year contract, which was at the time the most the club had ever paid for a player. Shunning the traditional centre-forwards' number 9, Yakubu asked to be assigned number 22, setting this number as a goal-scoring target for his first season, a feat he fell one goal short of achieving. He scored 11 minutes into his debut for the club, the first goal in a 2–1 win against Bolton Wanderers at the Reebok Stadium in September 2007. His first hat-trick for the club came against Fulham in a 3–0 home league win in December 2007.

Yakubu travelled to Ghana in early 2008 to compete in the Cup of Nations. Following Nigeria's exit from the competition, he was late in returning to his club, and as a result was dropped by manager David Moyes once back in England. His double against Newcastle United in a 3–1 win at Goodison Park on the last day of the 2007–08 season helped the Toffees clinch fifth place and a place in the 2008–09 UEFA Cup competition. He finished his first season with 15 Premier League goals to his name, and 21 goals in all competitions for Everton. Yakubu achieved his highest goal tally for a single season, and also became the first Everton player since Peter Beardsley to net 20 goals in a season.

Yakubu scored his 100th goal in English football in a league game at West Bromwich Albion early in the Premier League 2008–09 season. He scored a goal against Standard Liège in the UEFA Cup and got back on the scoresheet with a goal against Middlesbrough, his first goal in 10 games. He ruptured his achilles tendon in the 1–0 away win at Tottenham Hotspur on 30 November, ruling him out for the rest of the season. Yakubu played his first competitive game after the Achilles tendon injury against Burnley Reserves, and in his first start for the first team in almost a year, he scored within 11 minutes against Hull City in the League Cup. He came on for Jô in first-half injury time and scored an equaliser with his first touch to bring Everton level at Stamford Bridge against Chelsea. He later scored the winning goal against Stoke.

=== Leicester City ===
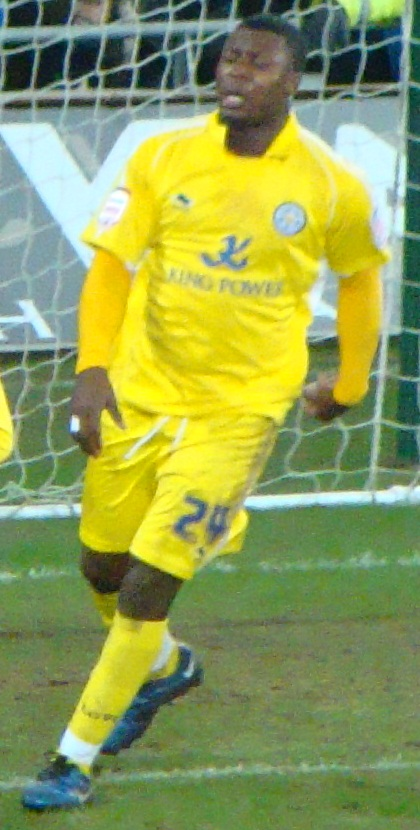
Yakubu playing for Leicester City in 2011

Yakubu joined Leicester City on loan until the end of the season on 13 January 2011, with the possibility of a permanent transfer. He made his debut and scored in a 1–1 draw against Preston North End on 15 January 2011, followed by another goal in a 4–2 win over Millwall on 22 January.

On 12 February 2011 he scored a left footed volley in their 2–0 win over local rivals Derby County. On 2 April 2011, he scored his first hat-trick against his former club Middlesbrough. He then scored a double in Leicester's 4–2 win over Watford.

=== Blackburn Rovers ===
On 31 August 2011, Yakubu signed a three-year contract with Blackburn Rovers for an undisclosed fee and was assigned the number 24 shirt by manager Steve Kean. He scored his first and second goals for Blackburn Rovers on 17 September on his Premier League debut against Arsenal in which Blackburn won 4–3. He was voted Man of the Match as he helped Blackburn to their first win of the season, with Blackburn fans chanting "Feed the Yak and he will score!" by the time the final whistle blew. He scored his third goal in the league in the 3–3 away draw against Norwich City. Yakubu's fourth and fifth goals of the league season came in an away 3–3 draw at Wigan Athletic on 19 November 2011. He opened the scoring from long range after 65 seconds and equalised with an injury-time penalty. He had earlier been behind an incident when Blackburn were 2–1 down, by dummying a short corner to allow team-mate Morten Gamst Pedersen to dribble the ball from the corner and cross for Junior Hoilett to equalise the game 2–2. At the end of the game, Yakubu admitted that he did not touch the ball and that the goal should not have stood.

On 3 December 2011, Yakubu scored all four goals for Blackburn in a 4–2 home win over Swansea City. He scored two in each half, finishing with a penalty. It was his first Blackburn hat-trick and his first four-goal game since the last day of the 2003–04 season, for Portsmouth against Middlesbrough. He scored 2 goals, one being a penalty, in his side's shock 2–3 victory against Manchester United at Old Trafford on 31 December 2011 which left him on 13 goals for the season in all competitions. On 15 January 2012, in a match against Fulham, Yakubu was sent off for the first time in the Premier League for a straight red. On his return from suspension, he scored against QPR. On 10 April 2012, Yakubu scored twice, while missing one penalty and scoring a second, in Blackburn's 2–3 loss at home to Liverpool. In his first season at Blackburn, he scored 18 goals, but the club were relegated to the Championship by the end of the season after a 1–0 home loss to in-form Wigan Athletic. After relegation was confirmed, Yakubu stated that he did not want to play Championship football and wanted to leave Blackburn.

=== Guangzhou R&F ===
Yakubu confirmed on 28 June 2012 that he had left Blackburn and had signed for Chinese side Guangzhou R&F, on an initial three-year contract. On 15 July, Yakubu made his Chinese Super League debut in a Guangzhou Derby match which Guangzhou R&F played against Guangzhou Evergrande at Tianhe Stadium. He scored the winning goal of the match in the 87th minute, ending Guangzhou Evergrande's 34-league-home-match unbeaten run.

=== Reading ===
On 2 February 2015, Reading signed free agent Yakubu on a contract until the end of the 2014–15 season. On 14 February, Yakubu scored his first goal for the Royals with the winner in a 2–1 defeat of Derby County at Pride Park to put the club into the quarter-finals of the FA Cup. Yakubu was released by Reading on 21 May 2015.

=== Kayserispor ===
On 31 August 2015, Yakubu signed a one-year contract, with the option of an additional year, with Süper Lig side Kayserispor.

=== Coventry City ===
On 13 February 2017, Yakubu signed for Coventry City until the end of the 2016–17 season. On 5 April 2017, having featured only three times due to suffering a hamstring injury, Yakubu's Coventry City contract was terminated by mutual consent. He announced his retirement from football on 22 November 2017.

== International career ==
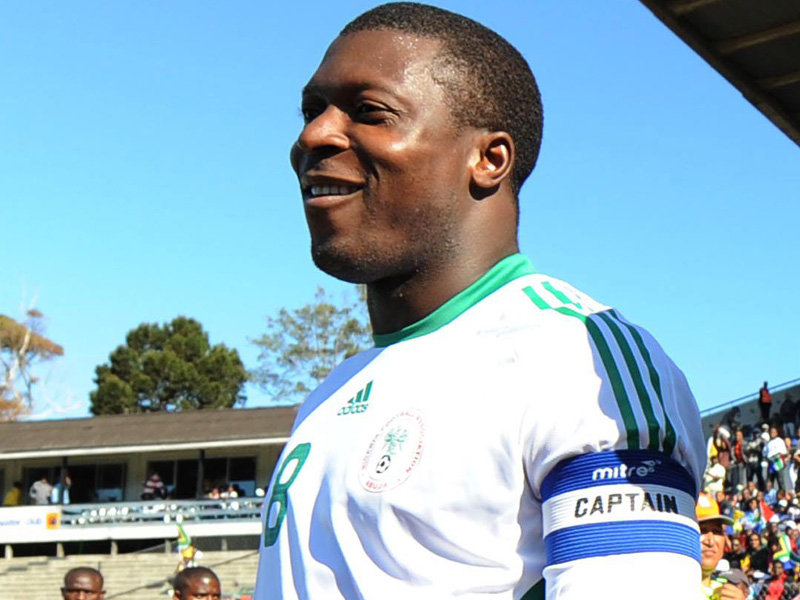
Yakubu as captain of Nigeria in 2008

Yakubu has scored 21 goals in his 58 appearances for Nigeria since his 2000 debut. He is currently the fourth highest international goalscorer for Nigeria.

=== 2000 Summer Olympics ===
In September 2000, Yakubu featured in Nigeria's squad for the 2000 Summer Olympics in Australia. Nigeria were the holders for the tournament. Then of Maccabi Haifa, the 17-year-old Yakubu wore the number 9 shirt. He scored the injury-time equaliser in Nigeria's first match, a 3–3 draw with Honduras on 13 September in Adelaide. He also played against the hosts Australia on 16 September in Sydney as his side won 3–2 but did not play on 19 September as they drew with Italy in Adelaide. He featured in the quarter-finals as Nigeria lost 4–1 to Chile in Melbourne on 23 September.

=== 2002 African Cup of Nations and 2002 FIFA World Cup ===
Yakubu made his full international debut on 22 April 2000 in a 4–0 home win in Lagos against Eritrea in qualification for the 2002 African Cup of Nations. He scored his first international goal in an away win against Namibia on 16 June 2001 in the same qualification campaign. On 1 July 2001, he scored his first international brace, with the second and fourth goals in a 4–0 away win over Sudan in the 2002 FIFA World Cup qualification stage. He was named in the squad for the 2002 Africa Cup of Nations in Mali and was given the number 8 shirt by manager Shuaibu Amodu. On 9 February 2002, Yakubu scored the only goal of the third-place play-off against Mali after 29 minutes. However, Yakubu was not named later in the year in the squad selected by new manager Festus Onigbinde for the 2002 World Cup in Japan and South Korea.

=== 2004 African Cup of Nations ===
On 7 June 2003, Yakubu scored Nigeria's first two goals as they came from behind to beat Malawi 4–1 in a qualifier for the 2004 African Cup of Nations. He retained the number 8 shirt in the squad named for the finals in Tunisia by manager Christian Chukwu but did not score. Alongside Celestine Babayaro and Victor Agali, he was sent home from the tournament for indiscipline. His then manager at Portsmouth, Harry Redknapp said he cared less about the tournament and was glad to have Yakubu back.

=== 2006 FIFA World Cup qualification ===
Yakubu scored the final goal in an away 3–0 victory over Zimbabwe and an equaliser in an away 1–1 draw against Gabon as Nigeria were beaten to the qualification place by Angola and missed the finals for the first time since 1994. Despite having a superior goal difference of +14 to +8, Nigeria did not qualify as the tie-breaker was head-to-head matches between Nigeria and Angola.

=== Decision against 2006 African Cup of Nations ===
Although Nigeria gained a place at the tournament due to their performance in World Cup qualification, Yakubu decided not to play at the 2006 African Cup of Nations to concentrate on his form at Middlesbrough instead. He was praised for his decision as the club defeated defending champions and league leaders Chelsea 3–0.

=== 2010 FIFA World Cup ===
At the 2010 FIFA World Cup in South Africa, Yakubu notably missed an open goal from three yards against South Korea in the last Group game but later went on to score a penalty to tie the match. Yakubu's penalty made sure that Nigeria earned a result of 2–2 draw, but this was not enough for his side to progress out of the group stages.

== Personal life ==
In 2008, Yakubu married Yvonne Lameen Ikhana, the daughter of former Nigerian international footballer Kadiri Ikhana, who is also the father-in-law to former Nigerian international footballer Patrick Ovie. Yakubu and Ikhana have two daughters. Yakubu and Yvonne Lameen Ikhana legally dissolved their marriage in September 2021, citing irreconcilable differences, and subsequently parted ways. He used to play barefoot on the streets of Benin, Nigeria, until his brother gave him a pair of boots aged 12.

== Career statistics ==
=== Club ===
Appearances and goals by club, season and competition
Club	Season	League			National cup (Note: Includes FA Cup, Chinese FA Cup, Turkish Cup)		League cup (Note: Includes Football League Cup)		Continental		Total	
Club	Season	Division	Apps	Goals	Apps	Goals	Apps	Goals	Apps	Goals	Apps	Goals
Maccabi Haifa	1999–2000	Israeli Premier League										
Maccabi Haifa	2000–01	Israeli Premier League	14	3							14	3
Maccabi Haifa	2001–02	Israeli Premier League	22	19					5 (Note: Appearances in UEFA Champions League)	5	27	24
Maccabi Haifa	2002–03	Israeli Premier League	13	16							13	16
Maccabi Haifa	Total		49	38					5	5	54	43
Hapoel Kfar Saba (loan)	1999–2000	Israeli Premier League	23	6							23	6
Portsmouth	2002–03	First Division	14	7	–		–		–		14	7
Portsmouth	2003–04	Premier League	37	16	4	1	2	2	–		43	19
Portsmouth	2004–05	Premier League	30	12	2	2	3	2	–		35	16
Portsmouth	Total		81	35	6	3	5	4	–		92	42
Middlesbrough	2005–06	Premier League	34	13	7	4	2	0	14 (Note: Appearances in UEFA Cup)	2	57	19
Middlesbrough	2006–07	Premier League	37	12	8	4	0	0	–		45	16
Middlesbrough	2007–08	Premier League	2	0	–		–		–		2	0
Middlesbrough	Total		73	25	15	8	2	0	14	2	104	35
Everton	2007–08	Premier League	29	15	1	0	3	3	6	3	39	21
Everton	2008–09	Premier League	14	4	0	0	1	0	2	1	17	5
Everton	2009–10	Premier League	25	5	0	0	2	1	9 (Note: Appearances in UEFA Europa League)	0	36	6
Everton	2010–11	Premier League	14	1	0	0	1	0	0	0	15	1
Everton	Total		82	25	1	0	7	4	17	4	107	33
Leicester City (loan)	2010–11	Championship	20	11	–		–		–		20	11
Blackburn Rovers	2011–12	Premier League	30	17	0	0	3	1	–		33	18
Guangzhou R&F	2012	Chinese Super League	14	9	1	1	–		–		15	10
Guangzhou R&F	2013	Chinese Super League	29	15	1	0	–		–		30	15
Guangzhou R&F	Total		43	24	2	1	–		–		45	25
Al-Rayyan	2013–14	Qatar Stars League	8	3	0	0	0	0	6 (Note: Appearances in AFC Champions League)	1	14	4
Al-Rayyan	2014–15	Qatari Second Division	2	2	0	0	–		–		2	2
Al-Rayyan	Total		10	5	0	0	0	0	6	1	16	6
Reading	2014–15	Championship	7	0	4	1	–		–		11	1
Kayserispor	2015–16	Süper Lig	12	0	5	3	–		–		17	3
Coventry City	2016–17	League One	3	0	–		–		–		3	0
Career total			424	170	33	16	17	9	42	12	516	207

=== International ===
Scores and results list Nigeria's goal tally first, score column indicates score after each Yakubu goal.

List of international goals scored by Yakubu
No.	Date	Venue	Opponent	Score	Result	Competition	Ref.
1	16 June 2001	Independence Stadium, Windhoek, Namibia	Namibia	1–0	2–0	2002 African Cup of Nations qualification	
2	1 July 2001	Al-Merrikh Stadium, Omdurman, Sudan	Sudan	2–0	4–0	2002 FIFA World Cup qualification	
3	1 July 2001	Al-Merrikh Stadium, Omdurman, Sudan	Sudan	4–0	4–0	2002 FIFA World Cup qualification	
4	9 February 2002	Stade Baréma Bocoum, Mopti, Mali	Mali	1–0	1–0	2002 African Cup of Nations	
5	30 May 2003	Moshood Abiola National Stadium, Abuja, Nigeria	Ghana	1–1	3–1	Friendly	
6	30 May 2003	Moshood Abiola National Stadium, Abuja, Nigeria	Ghana	2–1	3–1	Friendly	
7	1 June 2003	National Stadium, Lagos, Nigeria	Cameroon	2–0	3–0	Friendly	
8	7 June 2003	Moshood Abiola National Stadium, Abuja, Nigeria	Malawi	1–1	4–1	2004 African Cup of Nations qualification	
9	7 June 2003	Moshood Abiola National Stadium, Abuja, Nigeria	Malawi	2–1	4–1	2004 African Cup of Nations qualification	
10	5 September 2004	National Sports Stadium, Harare, Zimbabwe	Zimbabwe		3–0	2006 FIFA World Cup qualification	
11	9 October 2004	Stade Omar Bongo, Libreville, Gabon	Gabon	1–1	1–1	2006 FIFA World Cup qualification	
12	2 September 2006	Moshood Abiola National Stadium, Abuja, Nigeria	Niger	1–0	2–0	2008 Africa Cup of Nations qualification	
13	8 October 2006	Setsoto Stadium, Maseru, Lesotho	Lesotho	1–0	1–0	2008 Africa Cup of Nations qualification	
14	17 June 2007	Stade Général Seyni Kountché, Niamey, Niger	Niger	3–1	3–1	2008 Africa Cup of Nations qualification	
15	29 January 2008	Sekondi-Takoradi Stadium, Sekondi-Takoradi, Ghana	Benin	2–0	2–0	2008 Africa Cup of Nations	
16	3 February 2008	Accra Sports Stadium, Accra, Ghana	Ghana	1–0	1–2	2008 Africa Cup of Nations	
17	21 June 2008	Moshood Abiola National Stadium, Abuja, Nigeria	Equatorial Guinea	1–0	2–0	2010 FIFA World Cup qualification	
18	14 November 2009	Moi International Sports Centre, Kasarani, Kenya	Kenya	2–1	3–2	2010 FIFA World Cup qualification	
19	16 January 2010	Ombaka National Stadium, Benguela, Angola	Benin	1–0	1–0	2010 African Cup of Nations	
20	6 June 2010	Makhulong Stadium, Thembisa, South Africa	North Korea	1–0	3–1	Friendly	
21	22 June 2010	Moses Mabhida Stadium, Durban, South Africa	South Korea	2–2	2–2	2010 FIFA World Cup	

== Honours ==
Maccabi Haifa

- Israel Premier League: 2000–01, 2001–02

Portsmouth

- Football League First Division: 2002–03

Nigeria

- Africa Cup of Nations third-place: 2002, 2004, 2010
