= Simon Bala =

Anglican bishop in Nigeria

Simon Bala (died 2008) was the Anglican Bishop of Kubwa in Abuja Province of the Church of Nigeria.

He was consecrated as the pioneer Bishop of Kubwa on 13 March 2005; he had previously been Bishop of Gusau.

He died in 2008, and was succeeded as bishop by Duke Akamisoko.
