= Anglican Diocese of Zonkwa =

Anglican diocese in Nigeria

Coordinates: 09°47′N 08°17′E

The Anglican Diocese of Zonkwa is one of 13 within the Anglican Province of Abuja, itself one of 14 ecclesiastical provinces within the Church of Nigeria. The inaugural bishop was Duke Akamisoko; and the current bishop is the Right Rev. Jacob Kwashi
