= Diocese of Makurdi =

Diocese of Makurdi may refer to:

- Catholic Diocese of Makurdi
- Anglican Diocese of Makurdi
