= Brayden Clarke =

Welsh association football player

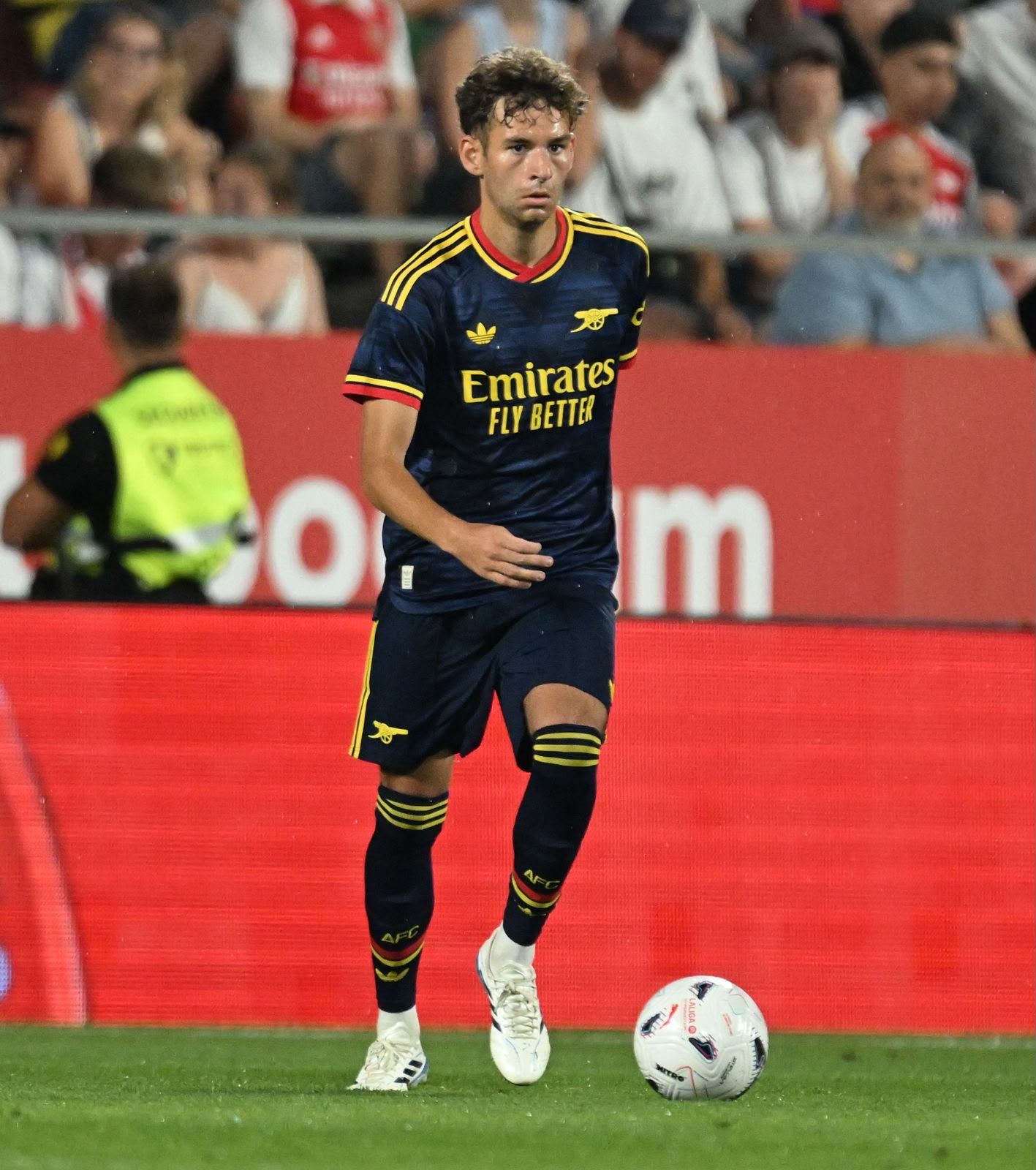
- Clarke in 2026

Personal information
- Full name: Brayden Cian Clarke
- Date of birth: 3 July 2007 (age 19)
- Place of birth: Birmingham, England
- Height: 6 ft 1 in (1.86 m)
- Position: Centre-back

Team information
- Current team: Arsenal
- Number: 38

Youth career
- 2016–2024: Wolverhampton Wanderers
- 2024–: Arsenal

International career^{‡}
Years	Team	Apps	(Gls)
2022	Wales U16	6	(0)
2022–2024	Wales U17	19	(0)
2024–	Wales U19	7	(0)
- ‡ National team caps and goals as of 19:03, 2 October 2025 (UTC)

Brayden Cian Clarke (born 3 July 2007) is a professional footballer who plays as a centre-back for Premier League side Arsenal. Born in England, he represents Wales at youth international level.

== Early career ==
Clarke was born on 3 July 2007 in Birmingham, West Midlands as his father Nigel Quashie was playing for West Bromwich Albion at the time. In 2010, at the age of three, he moved to Hagley. Clarke started his youth career at local club West Hagley and Stourbridge FC before joining the Wolverhampton Wanderers academy at nine years old.

In December 2022, at the age of 15, he made his debut for the Wolves U21 side.

In March 2024, Clarke joined the academy of fellow Premier League club Arsenal.

In July 2024, Clarke signed his first professional contract with Arsenal.

In May 2025, he received his first senior team call-up and was named on the bench for Arsenal in a Premier League match at the age of 17.

In July 2026, Clarke made his senior first-team debut for Arsenal in a 4–1 victory over Girona in the 49th Costa Brava Trophy.

== International career ==
Clarke was born in England and is of Welsh and English descent through his mother and English, Scottish and Ghanaian descent through his father. He plays for Wales internationally and he is also eligible to represent England.

At the age of 15, he made his debut for Wales U17s. Clarke featured for Wales at the UEFA European Under-17 Championship in 2023 and 2024. He is the only player in Wales' history to play in two consecutive Euro finals. He has also played for Wales at the UEFA European Under-19s Championship in 2025.

In 2026, Clarke was selected for the Wales under-19 squad for the UEFA European Under-19 Championship finals. His selection made him the first Wales player to be selected for three UEFA European Championship finals tournaments at youth level. He also captained Wales throughout the tournament.
