= Anglican Province of Abuja =

Anglican province in Nigeria

The Abuja Province is one of the 14 ecclesiastical provinces of the Church of Nigeria. It is one of the original 10 provinces, created when the current division was adopted in 2002, due to the huge dimension and growth of the Church of Nigeria. His headquarters are located in Abuja. The province comprises 17 dioceses, 96 archdeaconries and at least 476 parishes. The first archbishop and bishop of the Diocese of Abuja was Peter Akinola, from 2002 to 2010. He was succeeded by Nicholas Okoh, who also held office as bishop of the Diocese of Abuja from 25 March 2010 to 25 March 2020. The current archbishop is the Right Rev. Henry Ndukuba. He was installed on 25 March 2020.

The province comprises 13 dioceses:

- Abuja (26 November 1989; Bishop: Henry Ndukuba; first bishop was Peter Akinola, consecrated 16 November 1989)
- Bida (30 November 1999; Bishop: Jonah Kolo)
- Gboko (15 January 2009; Bishop Emmanuel Nyitsse
- Gwagwalada (26 November 1999; Bishop: Moses Tabwaye)
- Idah (14 March 2005; Bishop: Joseph Musa)
- Kafanchan (5 September 1990; Bishop: Marcus Dogo; first bishop W. W. Diya, consecrated 29 April 1990, Kaduna)
- Kubwa (19 March 2005; Bishop: Duke Akamisoko, appointed 2009; note: formerly Simon Bala who died November 2008)
- Kwoi (23 May 2008) Bishop: Paul Samuel Zamani)
- Lafia (29 November 1999; Bishop: Miller Maza)
- Makurdi (24 September 1990; Bishop: Nathan Inyom)
- Otukpo (11 December 1996; Bishop: David Bello; erected from Makurdi diocese; Ityobee Ugede, first bishop, consecrated 30 November 1996, Oke-Bola)
- Zaki-Biam (20 September 2018; Bishop : Jezreel Vandeh)
- Zonkwa (19 March 2005; Bishop: Jacob Kwashi

Missions in Africa and North America:

- Church of Nigeria Mission (Congo; 2005; Bishop: Abiodun Olaoye)
- Church of Nigeria Mission (Nomadic; 2006; Bishop: Simon Peters Mutum)
- Church of Nigeria North American Mission (Diocese of the West, 2011; Acting Bishop: Celestine Ironna | Diocese of the Trinity, 2012; Bishop: Olukayode Adebogun)
