= Paul Samuel Zamani =

Anglican bishop in Nigeria

Paul Samuel Zamani is an Anglican bishop in Nigeria. He is the current Bishop of Kwoi, one of 13 dioceses in the Anglican Province of Abuja, itself one of 14 provinces in the Church of Nigeria.

Zamani was born in Zonkwa on 2 June 1964 and educated at St Francis of Assisi Theological College in Wusasa.
