= 2002–03 Portsmouth F.C. season =

Portsmouth
2002–03 season
- Chairman: Milan Mandarić
- Manager: Harry Redknapp
- Stadium: Fratton Park
- First Division: 1st (promoted)
- FA Cup: Third round
- League Cup: Second round
- Top goalscorer: League: Svetoslav Todorov (26); All: Svetoslav Todorov (26)
- Highest home attendance: 19,558 vs. Wolverhampton Wanderers (15 March 2003)
- Lowest home attendance: 17,201 vs. Millwall (14 September 2002)
- Average home league attendance: 18,379

During the 2002–03 English football season, Portsmouth competed in the Football League First Division.

== Season summary ==
Portsmouth led the First Division for most of the season, and eventually finished as champions, six points clear of second-placed Leicester City. As champions, Portsmouth gained promotion to the FA Premier League, returning to the top flight after an absence of 15 years.

Bulgarian striker Svetoslav Todorov silenced his critics by finishing top scorer in the division with 26 goals, overhauling Nottingham Forest's David Johnson with a hat-trick against Bradford City on the last day of the season, in the game that confirmed Portsmouth as Football League champions.

== Kit ==
Portsmouth continue to produce their own kits under the club's own brand, Pompey Sport.

== Final league table ==
Pos	Team	Pld	W	D	L	GF	GA	GD	Pts	Promotion or relegation
1	Portsmouth (C, P)	46	29	11	6	97	45	+52	98	Promotion to 2003–04 FA Premier League
2	Leicester City (P)	46	26	14	6	73	40	+33	92	Promotion to 2003–04 FA Premier League
3	Sheffield United	46	23	11	12	72	52	+20	80	Qualification for First Division Playoffs
4	Reading	46	25	4	17	61	46	+15	79	Qualification for First Division Playoffs
5	Wolverhampton Wanderers (O, P)	46	20	16	10	81	44	+37	76	Qualification for First Division Playoffs

Updated to match(es) played on 11 May 2003. Source: Soccerway
Rules for classification: 1) points; 2) goal difference; 3) number of goals scored.
(C) Champions; (O) Play-off winners; (P) Promoted

== Results ==
Portsmouth's score comes first

=== Legend ===
Win	Draw	Loss

=== Football League First Division ===
Date	Opponent	Venue	Result	Attendance	Scorers
10 August 2002	Nottingham Forest	H	2–0	18,910	Burton, Péricard
13 August 2002	Sheffield United	A	1–1	16,093	Burton
17 August 2002	Crystal Palace	A	3–2	18,315	Foxe, Crowe (2)
24 August 2002	Watford	H	3–0	17,901	Merson, Todorov, Burton
26 August 2002	Grimsby Town	A	1–0	5,770	Burchill
31 August 2002	Brighton & Hove Albion	H	4–2	19,031	Taylor, Merson (pen), Todorov, Crowe
7 September 2002	Gillingham	A	3–1	8,717	Merson, Burchill, O'Neil
14 September 2002	Millwall	H	1–0	17,201	Todorov
17 September 2002	Wimbledon	H	4–1	18,837	Péricard, Todorov, Williams (own goal), Taylor
21 September 2002	Norwich City	A	0–1	21,335	
28 September 2002	Bradford City	H	3–0	18,459	Quashie (2), Péricard
5 October 2002	Rotherham United	A	3–2	8,604	Péricard, Todorov, Merson (pen)
19 October 2002	Coventry City	H	1–1	18,837	Péricard
26 October 2002	Burnley	A	3–0	15,788	Quashie, Todorov, Harper
29 October 2002	Preston North End	H	3–2	18,637	Stone, Merson, Taylor
2 November 2002	Leicester City	H	0–2	19,107	
6 November 2002	Wolverhampton Wanderers	A	1–1	27,022	Merson
9 November 2002	Derby County	A	2–1	26,587	Todorov, Burchill
16 November 2002	Stoke City	H	3–0	18,701	Burchill, Péricard, Todorov
23 November 2002	Sheffield Wednesday	A	3–1	16,602	Todorov (2), O'Neil
30 November 2002	Walsall	H	3–2	17,701	Quashie, Todorov, Taylor
7 December 2002	Reading	A	0–0	23,462	
14 December 2002	Stoke City	A	1–1	13,330	Crowe
21 December 2002	Ipswich Town	H	1–1	19,130	Todorov
26 December 2002	Crystal Palace	H	1–1	19,217	Merson
28 December 2002	Nottingham Forest	A	2–1	28,165	Taylor, Péricard
1 January 2003	Watford	A	2–2	15,048	Burton, Harper
13 January 2003	Sheffield United	H	1–2	18,872	O'Neil
18 January 2003	Brighton & Hove Albion	A	1–1	6,848	Todorov
1 February 2003	Grimsby Town	H	3–0	19,248	Yakubu, Ford (own goal), Quashie
8 February 2003	Derby County	H	6–2	19,503	Merson, Yakubu (2), Taylor, Todorov (2)
17 February 2003	Leicester City	A	1–1	31,775	Taylor
22 February 2003	Gillingham	H	1–0	19,521	de Zeeuw
1 March 2003	Millwall	A	5–0	9,697	Yakubu (2), Sherwood, Todorov, Merson (pen)
4 March 2003	Wimbledon	A	1–2	10,356	Merson
12 March 2003	Norwich City	H	3–2	19,221	Yakubu, Todorov (2)
15 March 2003	Wolverhampton Wanderers	H	1–0	19,558	Stone
19 March 2003	Coventry City	A	4–0	13,922	Caldwell (own goal), Stone, Harper, Merson
22 March 2003	Preston North End	A	1–1	16,665	Yakubu
5 April 2003	Walsall	A	2–1	7,899	Harper, Todorov
12 April 2003	Sheffield Wednesday	H	1–2	19,524	Bradbury
15 April 2003	Burnley	H	1–0	19,221	Todorov
18 April 2003	Ipswich Town	A	0–3	29,396	
21 April 2003	Reading	H	3–0	19,535	Péricard (2), Todorov
27 April 2003	Rotherham United	H	3–2	19,420	Merson (pen), Todorov (2)
4 May 2003	Bradford City	A	5–0	19,088	Festa, Todorov (3, 1 pen), Stone

=== FA Cup ===
Round	Date	Opponent	Venue	Result	Attendance	Goalscorers
R3	4 January 2003	Manchester United	A	1–4	67,222	Stone

=== League Cup ===
Round	Date	Opponent	Venue	Result	Attendance	Goalscorers
R1	10 September 2002	Peterborough United	H	2–0	8,581	Quashie, Primus
R2	1 October 2002	Wimbledon	H	1–3	11,754	Péricard

== First-team squad ==
Note: Flags indicate national team as defined under FIFA eligibility rules; some limited exceptions apply. Players may hold more than one non-FIFA nationality.

No.	Pos.	Nation	Player
1	GK	(Trinidad and Tobago) TRI	Shaka Hislop
2	DF	(England) ENG	Jason Crowe
4	DF	(England) ENG	Eddie Howe
5	DF	(Australia) AUS	Hayden Foxe
6	DF	(Netherlands) NED	Arjan de Zeeuw
7	MF	(Scotland) SCO	Kevin Harper
8	FW	(Scotland) SCO	Mark Burchill
9	FW	(Bulgaria) BUL	Svetoslav Todorov
10	FW	(England) ENG	Paul Merson
11	MF	(Scotland) SCO	Nigel Quashie
13	MF	(Ivory Coast) CIV	Lassina Diabaté
14	MF	(England) ENG	Matthew Taylor
16	MF	(Wales) WAL	Carl Robinson
17	FW	(France) FRA	Vincent Péricard (on loan from Juventus)

No.	Pos.	Nation	Player
18	FW	(England) ENG	Lee Bradbury
19	MF	(England) ENG	Steve Stone
20	FW	(Nigeria) NGA	Yakubu (on loan from Maccabi Haifa)
21	DF	(England) ENG	Lewis Buxton
22	GK	(Serbia and Montenegro) SCG	Saša Ilić
23	DF	(England) ENG	Carl Tiler
25	MF	(Scotland) SCO	Richard Hughes
26	MF	(England) ENG	Gary O'Neil
29	GK	(Japan) JPN	Yoshikatsu Kawaguchi
30	DF	(England) ENG	Linvoy Primus
34	FW	(Jamaica) JAM	Deon Burton
35	DF	(Italy) ITA	Gianluca Festa
38	MF	(England) ENG	Tim Sherwood

=== Left club during season ===
Note: Flags indicate national team as defined under FIFA eligibility rules; some limited exceptions apply. Players may hold more than one non-FIFA nationality.

No.	Pos.	Nation	Player
19	FW	(England) ENG	Steve Lovell (to Dundee)
20	FW	(England) ENG	Rory Allen (released)
22	MF	(England) ENG	Tom Curtis (to Mansfield Town)
22	DF	(Greece) GRE	Efstathios Tavlaridis (on loan from Arsenal)

No.	Pos.	Nation	Player
24	DF	(England) ENG	Scott Hiley (to Exeter City)
24	DF	(Finland) FIN	Markus Heikkinen (on loan from HJK Helsinki)
38	DF	(Scotland) SCO	Paul Ritchie (on loan from Manchester City)

== Reserve squad ==
The following players had squad numbers and/or professional contracts but did not make a first-team appearance during the season

Note: Flags indicate national team as defined under FIFA eligibility rules; some limited exceptions apply. Players may hold more than one non-FIFA nationality.

No.	Pos.	Nation	Player
3	DF	(England) ENG	Jamie Vincent
15	MF	(England) ENG	Courtney Pitt
27	MF	(England) ENG	Neil Barrett
28	DF	(England) ENG	Shaun Cooper
31	FW	(England) ENG	Luke Nightingale

No.	Pos.	Nation	Player
32	FW	(England) ENG	Rowan Vine
33	GK	(England) ENG	Chris Tardif
37	MF	(England) ENG	Carl Pettefer
39	MF	(England) ENG	Chris Clark
—	DF	(England) ENG	Justin Edinburgh

== Statistics ==
=== Starting 11 ===
Considering starts in all competitions

- GK: #1, (Trinidad and Tobago) Shaka Hislop, 49
- RWB: #30, (England) Linvoy Primus, 42
- CB: #4, (Australia) Hayden Foxe, 31
- CB: #6, (Netherlands) Arjan de Zeeuw, 26
- CB: #35, (Italy) Gianluca Festa, 29
- LWB: #14, (England) Matthew Taylor, 38
- CM: #7, (Scotland) Kevin Harper, 23
- CM: #10, (England) Paul Merson, 47
- CM: #11, (Scotland) Nigel Quashie, 44
- CF: #9, (Bulgaria) Svetoslav Todorov, 46
- CF: #17, (France) Vincent Péricard, 19 (#19, (England) Steve Stone, also has 19 starts, as a right wing-back)
