= Anglican Diocese of Lafia =

Anglican diocese in Nigeria

Coordinates: 8°29′30″N 8°31′0″E

The Anglican Diocese of Lafia is one of 13 within the Anglican Province of Abuja, itself one of 14 ecclesiastical provinces within the Church of Nigeria. The diocese was created in 1999 and the current bishop is the Rught Rev. Godwin Adeyi Robinson who replaced the pioneer bishop Miller Maza on his retirement in 2017; Robinson was elected coadjutor and consecrated a bishop on 7 May 2017 at the Cathedral of the Transfiguration, Owerri.
