= Simon Peters Mutum =

Simon Peters Mutum is an Anglican bishop in Nigeria: he is a Missionary bishop within the Anglican Province of Abuja, itself one of 14 provinces within the Church of Nigeria.

He was appointed non-Geographic bishop for "the nomadic mission to thousands of Fulanis who have not heard about Christ" in 2005, having previously been Bishop of Jalingo.
