= Anglican Diocese of Kubwa =

Anglican diocese in Nigeria

Coordinates: 8°50′N 7°10′E

The Anglican Diocese of Kubwa is one of 13 within the Anglican Province of Abuja, itself one of 14 ecclesiastical provinces within the Church of Nigeria. The current bishop is the Right Rev. Duke Akamisoko.
