= Quarshie =

Quarshie is a surname. Notable people with the surname include:

- Emmanuel Quarshie (1953–2013), Ghanaian footballer
- Ato Quarshie (1944–2019), Ghanaian politician
- Edwin Quarshie (born 1995), Central African footballer
- Hugh Quarshie, Ghanaian-born British actor
- Joshua Quarshie (born 2004), German footballer of Ghanaian descent
- Michael Quarshie (born 1979), Finnish American football player of Ghanaian descent
- Tetteh Quarshie (1842–1892), Ghanaian agriculturalist

== See also ==
- Mark Quashie (born 1966), Trinidadian-American vocalist better known as The Mad Stuntman
- Nigel Quashie (born 1978), Scottish footballer of Ghanaian descent
