= Lassina Diabaté =

Ivorian footballer (born 1974)

Personal information
- Date of birth: 16 September 1974 (age 52)
- Place of birth: Bouaké, Ivory Coast
- Height: 1.75 m (5 ft 9 in)
- Position: Defensive midfielder

Youth career
- Olympique Alès

Senior career*
Years	Team	Apps	(Gls)
1992–1993	Olympique Alès		
1993–1995	FC Bourges		
1995–1997	Perpignan	50	(1)
1997–2001	Bordeaux	91	(2)
2001–2002	Auxerre	23	(0)
2002–2003	Portsmouth	16	(0)
2004	Ajaccio	13	(0)
2004–2005	Sint-Truiden	20	(0)
2005–2006	Lausanne-Sport	14	(0)
2007	Cannes	0	(0)
2008–2009	Louhans-Cuiseaux	46	(0)
2011–2012	Mérignac		
Total		273	(3)

International career
1997–2003	Ivory Coast	32	(1)
- * Club domestic league appearances and goals

Lassina Diabaté (born 16 September 1974) is an Ivorian former professional footballer. He played for Ivory Coast and a few clubs in Europe. He played primarily as a defensive midfielder but could also play as a centre back.

Born in Bouaké, Ivory Coast, Diabaté acquired French nationality by naturalization on 7 July 1997. He played for several clubs in France, including Perpignan FC, Bordeaux and Auxerre. In his time at Bordeaux he won Ligue 1 in the 1998–99 season.

He was a participant at the 1998, 2000 and 2002 African Cup of Nations. He is best known for wearing fluorescent orange soccer boots, before such designs became fashionable. Diabaté was signed by Portsmouth in October 2002. During his time in England with Portsmouth his manager Harry Redknapp described him as being "as hard as iron" and said: "I wouldn't want to be a striker playing against him, he is a wonderfully aggressive player who controls the midfield for us". He made 25 league appearances during Portsmouth's 2002–03 season after which they were promoted to the Premier League.

He often struggled with injuries at various points in his career, which limited the amount of time he spent at each club.

== Honours ==
Portsmouth

- Football League First Division: 2002–03
