= Anglican Diocese of Zaki-Biam =

Anglican diocese in Nigeria

The Anglican Diocese of Zaki-Biam is one of 13 dioceses within the Anglican Province of Abuja, itself one of 14 ecclesiastical provinces within the Church of Nigeria. The current bishop is the Right Rev. Jezreel Vandeh
