= Nathan Inyom =

Anglican bishop in Nigeria

Nathan Inyom is an Anglican bishop in Nigeria. From 1990 he has been the Bishop of Makurdi, one of 13 dioceses of the Anglican Province of Abuja, itself one of 14 provinces of the Church of Nigeria.
