= Anglican Diocese of Kwoi =

Anglican diocese in Nigeria

Coordinates: 9°27′N 8°01′E

The Anglican Diocese of Kwoi is one of 13 within the Anglican Province of Abuja, itself one of 14 ecclesiastical provinces within the Church of Nigeria. The current bishop is the Right Rev. Paul Samuel Zamani
