= Jezreel Vandeh =

Anglican bishop in Nigeria

Jezreel Vandeh is an Anglican bishop in Nigeria: since 2019 he has been Bishop of Zaki-Biam one of 13 dioceses within the Anglican Province of Abuja, itself one of 14 provinces within the Church of Nigeria.
