= Gary O'Neil =

English football manager (born 1983)

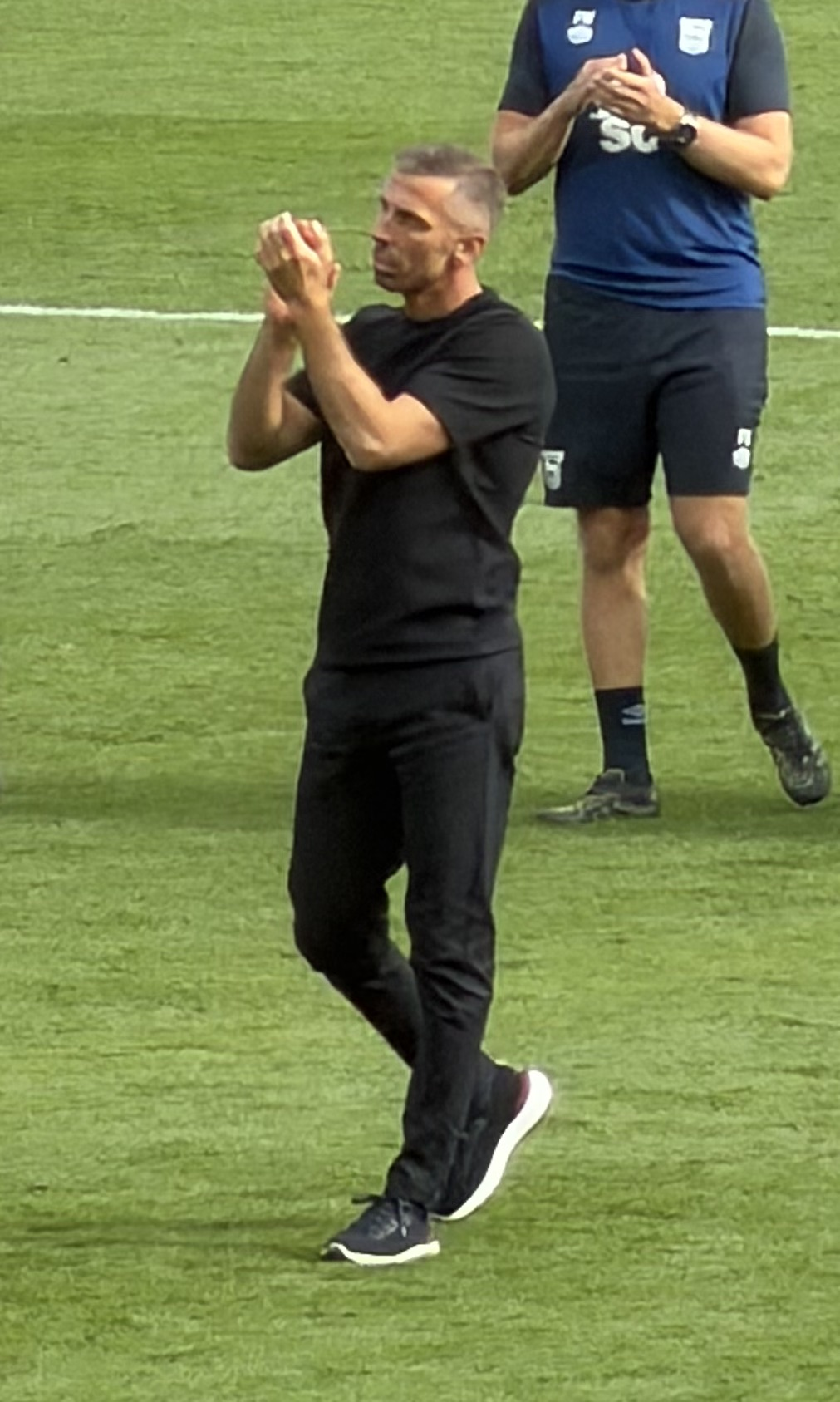
- O'Neil with Ipswich Town in 2026

Personal information
- Full name: Gary Paul O'Neil
- Date of birth: 18 May 1983 (age 43)
- Place of birth: Beckenham, England
- Height: 1.73 m (5 ft 8 in)
- Position: Midfielder

Team information
- Current team: Ipswich Town (manager)

Youth career
- 1998-2000: Portsmouth

Senior career*
Years	Team	Apps	(Gls)
2000–2007	Portsmouth	174	(16)
2003	→ Walsall (loan)	7	(0)
2004	→ Cardiff City (loan)	9	(1)
2007–2011	Middlesbrough	109	(10)
2011–2013	West Ham United	48	(3)
2013–2014	Queens Park Rangers	29	(1)
2014–2016	Norwich City	51	(0)
2016–2018	Bristol City	33	(1)
2018–2019	Bolton Wanderers	29	(3)
Total		489	(35)

International career
2001–2002	England U19	8	(0)
2002–2003	England U20	7	(0)
2003–2004	England U21	9	(0)

Managerial career
- 2022–2023: Bournemouth
- 2023–2024: Wolverhampton Wanderers
- 2026: Strasbourg
- 2026–: Ipswich Town
- * Club domestic league appearances and goals

Gary Paul O'Neil (born 18 May 1983) is an English football manager and former player, who is currently the manager of Premier League club Ipswich Town.

O'Neil made 216 Premier League appearances and scored 18 goals between 2003 and 2016, representing Portsmouth, Middlesbrough, West Ham United and Norwich City. He also played in the second tier for those clubs, including spells at Walsall, Cardiff City, Queens Park Rangers, Bristol City and Bolton Wanderers.

In his first job as a manager, O'Neil led Bournemouth to a 15th place finish in the 2022–23 Premier League season, but was then dismissed ahead of the following campaign. He was appointed head coach by Wolverhampton Wanderers in August 2023 and was sacked from the position in December 2024. O'Neil then served as head coach of Ligue 1 club Strasbourg until June 2026, when he was appointed as manager of newly promoted Premier League side Ipswich Town.

== Club career ==
=== Portsmouth ===
Whilst at Portsmouth, Tony Pulis gave O'Neil his first team debut as a 16-year-old on 29 January 2000 at home to Barnsley in the First Division, but then kept him out of the spotlight for the rest of the season. On 19 August 2000, he made his first appearance of the 2000-01 season, coming on as a second-half substitute, in a 1-1 draw against Grimsby Town. The following year both Pulis and his successor Steve Claridge used O'Neil sparingly, due to suffering a knee injury that required a knee surgery. He made his return from injury, coming on as a 64th minute substitute, in a 1-1 draw against Queens Park Rangers on 14 April 2001. Following this, Portsmouth's third manager of a disastrous season, Graham Rix, made O'Neil a starter for the final five matches of the season. Portsmouth went into the final game against Barnsley needing to win to have any chance of avoiding relegation to the Second Division. Portsmouth won the match 3–0 and survived, with O'Neil scoring the second goal, his first in professional football.

In the 2001–02 season, Harry Redknapp then took over as manager at the end of the season, O'Neil was one of the few players to be retained in Redknapp's rebuilding of the squad. On 9 March 2002, he scored a volley against his boyhood club Millwall. However, during the match, O'Neil suffered a calf injury and was out for weeks. On 30 March 2002, he made his return to the starting the whole game, in a 2-0 loss against Preston North End.

In Redknapp's first full season, O'Neil initially started in the midfield position for the first two league matches before finding his playing time, coming from the substitute bench. On 7 September 2002, he came on as a 73rd minute substitute and scored his first goal of the season, in a 3-0 win against Gillingham. On 23 November 2002, O'Neil scored his second goal of the season, in a 3-1 win against Sheffield Wednesday. On 11 January 2003, he scored his third goal of the season, in a 2-1 loss against Sheffield United. During the match, O'Neil suffered a hamstring injury and was out for a month. But on 22 February 2003, he made his return from injury, coming on as a late substitute, in a 1-0 win against Gillingham. O'Neill started 11 league matches, scoring three goals, as Portsmouth won the First Division title and promotion to the Premier League.

O'Neil was loaned to Walsall at the beginning of the 2003–04 season in order to gain further first team experience. His performances for the Midlands side and Portsmouth's increasing injury problems led to a recall in November 2003. He went straight into the starting eleven for his Premier League debut against bottom of the table Leeds United at Fratton Park and scored two goals in a 6–1 win.

This performance secured his place for the next match, away at Fulham, however, O’Neil had to travel to Dubai to captain England Under 20s in the 2003 FIFA World Youth Championship. Upon his return, O'Neil found that Portsmouth's injury problems had eased and he could not break back into the team for the remainder of the season.

At the beginning of the 2004–05 season, he was loaned to Cardiff City to gain further first team experience, scoring once in the league against Millwall. He was recalled to Portsmouth in November due to another injury crisis. He made his return to the side in one of the biggest matches of the season, a 2–1 defeat at Southampton. He was picked again for the next match, at home to Manchester City, and scored in a 3–1 loss. This was the last match of Redknapp's reign, and technical director Velimir Zajec took over as temporary manager and made O'Neil a regular in the Pompey midfield.

During Zajec's five-month reign, Portsmouth fell from mid-table to relegation candidates and Alain Perrin was appointed to keep the club in the Premier League. During this period, O’Neil scored away at Manchester United, and this led to European champions Liverpool bidding £5 million for O’Neil, but this was rejected by Portsmouth.

O'Neil went into the 2005–06 season as a regular for Perrin's new-look team and similarly to the 2002–03 campaign, he was one of the few players to survive from the previous year. By November, Portsmouth were at the bottom of the Premier League and Perrin was sacked only seven months after being appointed. Harry Redknapp returned as Pompey manager and in his first match back in charge, away at Tottenham Hotspur, O'Neil retained his place in the team and was picked on the right of midfield. O'Neil's late handball conceded the penalty in order for Spurs to regain the lead.

O'Neil was then moved into his preferred position of central midfield a few games later and Pompey went on their best run of the season with O'Neil scoring in successive home games. In the home game against Everton in January 2006, O'Neil captained Pompey for the first time but was played on the right of midfield to allow new signings Pedro Mendes and Sean Davis to form a partnership in the middle. Pompey lost the game 1–0 and went on a run of form that left them near certainties for relegation in mid-March, but O'Neil's performance in a crucial 1–1 draw against Bolton Wanderers saw him keep his place in the starting eleven. Two weeks after this draw, Pedro Mendes' last minute winner against Manchester City sparked a comeback. Pompey gained 14 points out of the next seven games and secured survival at Wigan Athletic's JJB Stadium on 29 April with a 2–1 victory.

O'Neil was a regular on the right of midfield for Portsmouth in the 2006–07 season and despite only contributing one goal, Portsmouth finished 9th.

=== Middlesbrough ===
O'Neil signed for Middlesbrough on 31 August 2007 for an undisclosed fee, believed to be in the region of £5 million. Reports surfacing in May 2008, suggested that O'Neil might look to move on from Middlesbrough after failing to settle on Teesside.

O'Neil scored his first Middlesbrough goal in the 2008–09 season on 29 October in Middlesbrough's 2–0 win over Manchester City.

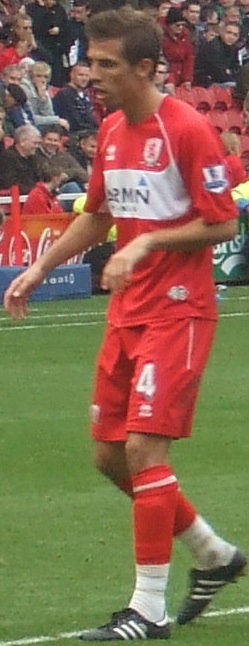
O'Neil playing for Middlesbrough in 2008

O'Neil started the 2009–10 season as manager Gareth Southgate's first-choice central midfielder, with Julio Arca being dropped to the bench for the first few matches of the season. It was soon revealed that O'Neil would require a hernia operation, yet he spoke out and said he would "delay the operation to ease Boro's midfield crisis." The first game after his operation, on 12 September, led to his first goal of the season. He was fouled in the box yet managed to pull himself up to loop Marvin Emnes' return ball over the Ipswich Town keeper in a 3–1 win. O'Neil made 120 appearances and scored twelve goals in total for Boro.

=== West Ham United ===
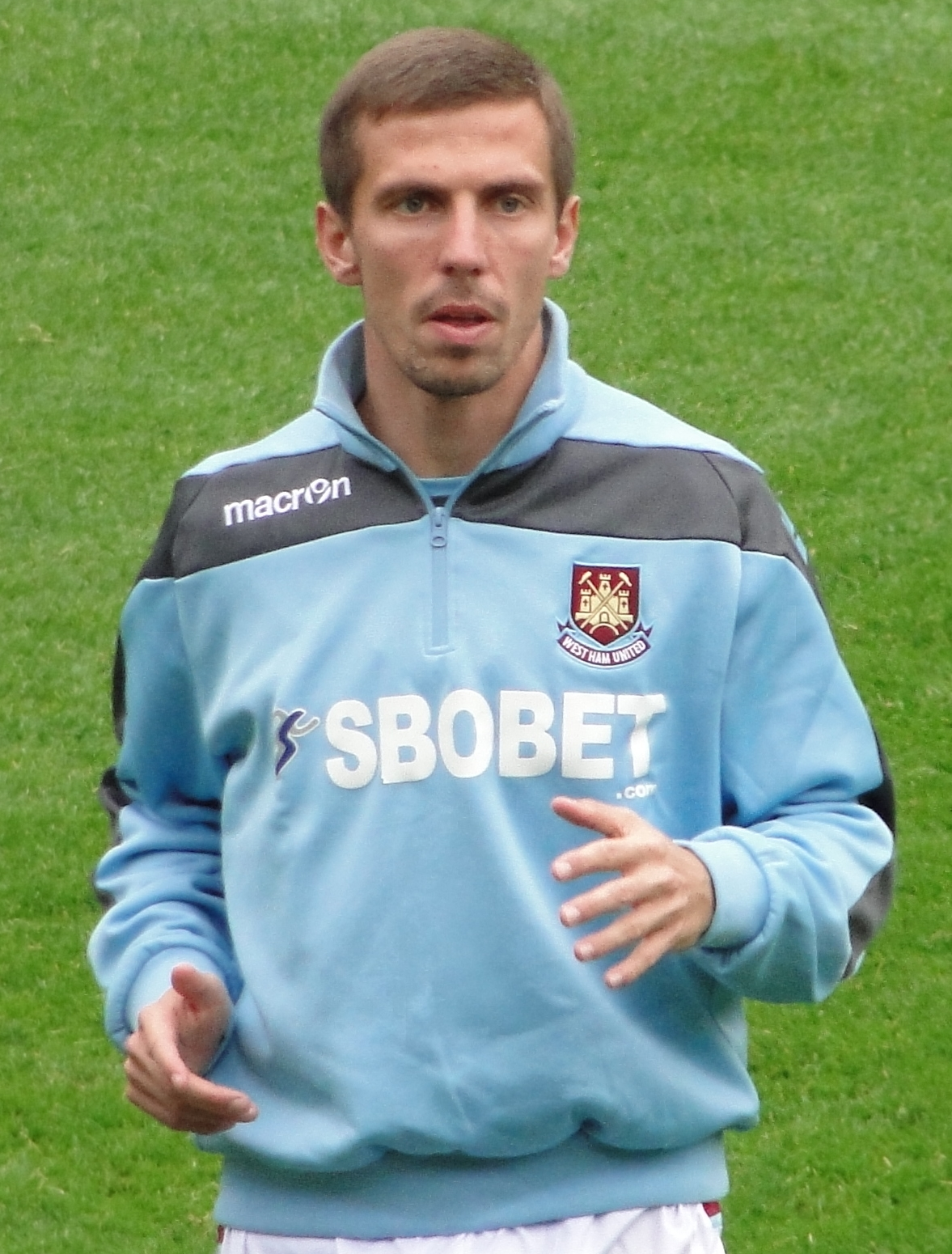
O'Neil playing for West Ham United in 2012

On 25 January 2011, O'Neil completed a move to West Ham United on a 2 1/2-year contract for an undisclosed fee. He made his debut in the League Cup semi-final second leg against Birmingham City, coming on as an 83rd-minute substitute for Luis Boa Morte. On 6 February 2011, O'Neil made his Premier League debut for the Hammers against Birmingham City in a 1–0 defeat at Upton Park and also completed the full 90 minutes. His 2010–11 season was ended prematurely on 16 April 2011, following a tackle by Aston Villa's Nigel Reo-Coker during West Ham's 2–1 home defeat at Upton Park. O'Neil was carried off on a stretcher after the challenge. He underwent a two-hour ankle operation and endured several months out of action with concern that his footballing career was in jeopardy. O'Neil was reported as considering taking legal action against Reo-Coker. By the end of the 2010–11 season, he had made nine appearances for the Hammers in all competitions.

O'Neil scored his first goal for West Ham in a 4–1 away win against Blackpool on 21 February 2012, and proved to be a key player in the team's end of season form, which saw them return to the Premier League after beating Blackpool 2–1 at Wembley in the Championship play-off final. On 7 June 2013, it was confirmed that he had been released by West Ham. Although released, O'Neil said that discussions were taking place related to him being offered a new contract and that he was likely to sign a new deal nearer the start of the new season. However, David Gold announced on his Twitter account that O'Neil had declined a new contract offer and consequently left the club.

=== Queens Park Rangers ===
On 7 August 2013, O'Neil signed for Championship side Queens Park Rangers on a one-year deal, re-uniting with former manager Harry Redknapp. He scored his first goal for the club on 11 January 2014 in a 3–1 win over Ipswich Town. O'Neil was a member of the Queens Park Rangers side which won the 2014 Football League Championship play-off final, 1–0 against Derby County on 24 May 2014. He was sent off in the 60th minute in the game at Wembley for a professional foul on Johnny Russell.

=== Norwich City ===
On 5 August 2014, O'Neil signed for Championship side Norwich City, on a two-year deal. At the end of his contract, he left the club.

=== Bristol City ===
On 9 June 2016, O'Neil signed for Championship side Bristol City on a two-year contract starting on 1 July 2016. He scored his first goal for Bristol City in a 2–1 loss at Reading on 26 November 2016.

He was released by Bristol City at the end of the 2017–18 season.

=== Bolton Wanderers ===
On 3 August 2018, he completed a move to Bolton Wanderers on an initial short-term contract until January 2019, following a successful trial spell at the University of Bolton Stadium. He made his Bolton debut a day after signing, after coming on as a second-half substitute for fellow debutant Luke Murphy in a 2–1 win over West Bromwich Albion at The Hawthorns.

He played over thirty games for Bolton in the 2018–19 season, scoring against Rotherham United, Millwall and Wigan Athletic, but could not prevent the club from being relegated to League One. However, his efforts were recognised by the club's supporters as he won the Player of the Year award.

== International career ==
O'Neil earned caps for England at U19, U20 & U21 youth level, and captained England at the 2003 FIFA World Youth Championship. He made nine appearances for the England under-21 team.

== Managerial career ==
=== Early career ===
In August 2020, O'Neil was appointed as assistant manager to Barry Lewtas for Liverpool's under-23 squad.

Following the appointment of Jonathan Woodgate as manager of Championship club Bournemouth until the end of the 2020–21 season, O'Neil joined Bournemouth as senior first team coach on 23 February 2021. He remained at the club following Woodgate's departure at the end of the season, and was a part of the coaching staff that got the club promoted to the Premier League under new manager Scott Parker in the 2021–22 EFL Championship season.

=== Bournemouth ===
On 30 August 2022, O'Neil was placed in caretaker charge by Bournemouth following Parker's dismissal. O’Neil’s first game in charge was a 0–0 draw against Wolverhampton Wanderers, before picking up his first victory in the club's following match, a 3–2 victory against Nottingham Forest on 3 September. They remained unbeaten for a further 4 games, including a 2–1 victory against Leicester on 8 October, while O'Neil garnered a nomination for Premier League Manager of the Month for the team's performances in September. He remained in caretaker charge until the season paused for the 2022 FIFA World Cup, adding another Premier League victory against Everton on 12 November during that stretch. On 27 November, having picked up 13 points from a possible 33, O'Neil was appointed as Bournemouth's permanent head coach, signing an initial 18-month contract.

In the eight games immediately following O'Neil's permanent appointment, the club failed to pick up a single win. However, in April 2023, O'Neil's side secured their place in the top flight by winning five matches out of seven, including victories over relegation contenders Leicester City, Southampton and Leeds United. Despite this success, however, on 19 June 2023, Bournemouth announced they had dismissed O'Neil and appointed Rayo Vallecano manager Andoni Iraola to replace him.

=== Wolverhampton Wanderers ===
On 9 August 2023, O'Neil was appointed head coach of Premier League club Wolverhampton Wanderers on a three-year deal, replacing Julen Lopetegui who had left due to disputes with the board. He became the club's first English-born manager since Kenny Jackett left in 2016. In O’Neil’s first match in charge, the team lost by a single goal away to Manchester United in which Wolves had a penalty appeal turned down in added time. Jon Moss, the Select Group 1 Manager of Referees, apologised to O'Neil and said it was the wrong call. On 30 September, Wolves inflicted a first defeat of the season on reigning champions Manchester City by winning 2–1.

O'Neil led Wolves to success in a Black Country derby against West Bromwich Albion, at the first time of asking as Wolves head coach, in the fourth round of the FA Cup on 28 January 2024 – the team securing a 2–0 victory at The Hawthorns. It was Wolves' first success in any match against West Brom since 2011, their first win in any game at The Hawthorns since 1996, and the team's first FA Cup tie victory over the Baggies since 1949.

In his first season, O'Neil led Wolves to a 14th place finish and the quarter-finals of the FA Cup, an achievement that earned O’Neil a lot of praise due to him inheriting a squad that had several key departures and few arrivals joining the squad. Due to the success of his first season, O'Neil signed a new four-year contract at Wolves on 9 August 2024.

O'Neil's second season in charge of Wolves began poorly, with the club failing to win any of their first ten league games, leaving them 19th in the league with three points. Wolves bounced back with a 2–0 home win over Southampton and an unexpected 4–1 away win over Fulham, lifting the team out of the relegation zone.

On 15 December 2024, O'Neil was sacked by Wolverhampton Wanderers following a 2–1 home defeat to Ipswich Town. At the time, Wolves were 19th in the league, four points from safety. They had suffered eleven defeats and won only two games all season. O'Neil also struggled with discipline in his final two games, with both ending in brawls; Mario Lemina lost the captaincy for a confrontation with West Ham's Jarrod Bowen, while Rayan Aït-Nouri was sent off after the Ipswich game, which also saw Matheus Cunha appear to fight with Ipswich’s staff. O'Neil said he "never had such a struggle" to coach players. O’Neil was then replaced by Vítor Pereira.

=== Strasbourg ===
On 7 January 2026, O'Neil was appointed as head coach of Ligue 1 side Strasbourg to replace Liam Rosenior, following Rosenior’s departure to Chelsea. In his first match in charge, O’Neil led Strasbourg to a 6–0 win over Avranches in the round of 32 in the Coupe de France. On 18 January, in his first Ligue 1 game, his side won 2–1 at home to Metz.

=== Ipswich Town ===
On 23 June 2026, O'Neil was appointed manager of newly promoted Premier League club Ipswich Town on a three-year deal. O'Neil began his tenure in charge with a 2–1 victory over Sunderland. In his debut cup fixture, he secured a win against Leicester City, marking the club's first victory over Leicester since 2013. O'Neil enjoyed a strong start to the campaign, winning four of his opening eight matches in charge across all competitions, culminating in a 2–1 victory against Fulham on 10 October 2026.

== Personal life ==
O'Neil was born in Beckenham, London and grew up in Downham. He married Donna Guerin in 2006. As of March 2023, they have two daughters and a son. Their son has acted on the television series Grantchester and in 2023, joined AFC Wimbledon's academy aged 9. On 17 September 2026, O'Neil revealed on social media that his father, Graham, had died.

== Career statistics ==
Appearances and goals by club, season and competition
Club	Season	League			FA Cup		League Cup		Other		Total	
Club	Season	Division	Apps	Goals	Apps	Goals	Apps	Goals	Apps	Goals	Apps	Goals
Portsmouth	1999–2000	First Division	1	0	0	0	0	0	—		1	0
Portsmouth	2000–01	First Division	10	1	0	0	2	0	—		12	1
Portsmouth	2001–02	First Division	33	1	1	0	1	0	—		35	1
Portsmouth	2002–03	First Division	30	3	1	0	1	0	—		32	3
Portsmouth	2003–04	Premier League	3	2	0	0	2	0	—		5	2
Portsmouth	2004–05	Premier League	24	2	2	0	2	0	—		28	2
Portsmouth	2005–06	Premier League	36	6	2	0	1	1	—		39	7
Portsmouth	2006–07	Premier League	35	1	2	0	0	0	—		37	1
Portsmouth	2007–08	Premier League	2	0	0	0	1	0	—		3	0
Portsmouth	Total		174	16	8	0	10	1	0	0	192	17
Walsall (loan)	2003–04	First Division	7	0	0	0	0	0	—		7	0
Cardiff City (loan)	2004–05	Championship	9	1	0	0	0	0	—		9	1
Middlesbrough	2007–08	Premier League	26	3	3	0	0	0	—		29	3
Middlesbrough	2008–09	Premier League	29	3	4	0	2	0	—		35	3
Middlesbrough	2009–10	Championship	36	4	1	1	0	0	—		37	5
Middlesbrough	2010–11	Championship	18	0	1	1	0	0	—		19	1
Middlesbrough	Total		109	10	9	2	2	0	0	0	120	12
West Ham United	2010–11	Premier League	8	0	0	0	1	0	—		9	0
West Ham United	2011–12	Championship	16	2	1	0	0	0	3	0	20	2
West Ham United	2012–13	Premier League	24	1	1	0	2	0	—		27	1
West Ham United	Total		48	3	2	0	3	0	3	0	56	3
Queens Park Rangers	2013–14	Championship	29	1	1	0	0	0	3	0	33	1
Norwich City	2014–15	Championship	22	0	1	0	1	0	1	0	25	0
Norwich City	2015–16	Premier League	29	0	1	0	4	0	—		34	0
Norwich City	Total		51	0	2	0	5	0	1	0	59	0
Bristol City	2016–17	Championship	29	1	1	0	0	0	—		30	1
Bristol City	2017–18	Championship	4	0	0	0	2	0	—		6	0
Bristol City	Total		33	1	1	0	2	0	0	0	36	1
Bolton Wanderers	2018–19	Championship	29	3	1	0	1	0	—		31	3
Career total			489	35	24	2	22	1	7	0	542	38

== Managerial statistics ==
As of match played 21 November 2026

Managerial record by team and tenure
Team	From	To	Record					Ref
Team	From	To	P	W	D	L	Win %	Ref
Bournemouth	30 August 2022	19 June 2023	37	11	6	20	29.7	
Wolverhampton Wanderers	9 August 2023	15 December 2024	63	20	11	32	31.7	
Strasbourg	7 January 2026	23 June 2026	27	13	6	8	48.1	
Ipswich Town	23 June 2026	Present	13	4	2	7	30.8	
Total			140	48	25	67	34.3	–

== Honours ==
=== Player ===
Portsmouth

- Football League First Division: 2002–03

West Ham United

- Football League Championship play-offs: 2012

Queens Park Rangers

- Football League Championship play-offs: 2014

Norwich City

- Football League Championship play-offs: 2015
