= Anglican Diocese of Gboko =

Anglican diocese in Nigeria

The Anglican Diocese of Gboko is one of 13 dioceses within the Anglican Province of Abuja, itself one of 14 ecclesiastical provinces within the Church of Nigeria. The current bishop is Emmanuel Nyitsse
