= Emmanuel Nyitsse =

Anglican bishop in Nigeria

Emmanuel Nyitsse is an Anglican bishop in Nigeria: he is the current Bishop of Gboko one of 13 dioceses within the Anglican Province of Abuja, itself one of 14 provinces within the Church of Nigeria.
