= Ricardo Fuller =

Jamaican footballer (born 1979)

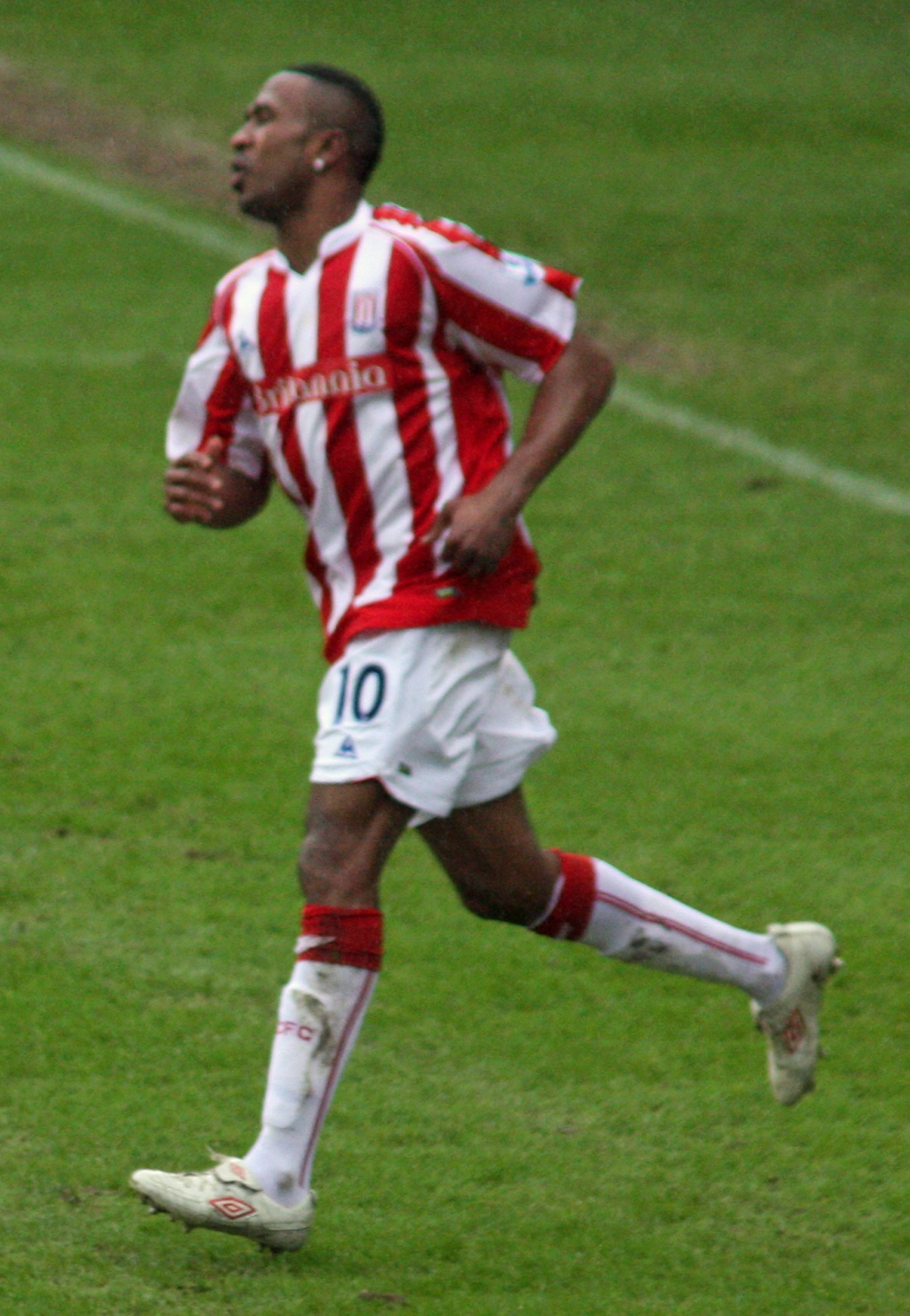
- Fuller playing for Stoke City in 2010

Personal information
- Full name: Ricardo Dwayne Fuller
- Date of birth: 31 October 1979 (age 47)
- Place of birth: Kingston, Jamaica
- Height: 6 ft 3 in (1.91 m)
- Position: Forward

Senior career*
Years	Team	Apps	(Gls)
1998–2001	Tivoli Gardens		
2001	Crystal Palace	8	(0)
2001–2002	Tivoli Gardens	16	(12)
2001–2002	→ Heart of Midlothian (loan)	27	(8)
2002–2004	Preston North End	58	(27)
2004–2005	Portsmouth	31	(1)
2005–2006	Southampton	31	(9)
2006	→ Ipswich Town (loan)	3	(2)
2006–2012	Stoke City	182	(43)
2012–2013	Charlton Athletic	31	(5)
2013–2014	Blackpool	27	(6)
2014–2015	Millwall	38	(4)
2015–2016	Oldham Athletic	5	(0)
2019–2020	Nantwich Town	21	(4)
2020	Hanley Town	0	(0)
Total		478+	(121+)

International career
1999–2012	Jamaica	77	(10)
- * Club domestic league appearances and goals

Ricardo Dwayne Fuller (born 31 October 1979) is a retired Jamaican professional footballer who played as a forward.

Fuller started his football career with Jamaican side Tivoli Gardens, before he moved to England with Crystal Palace in February 2001. He returned to Jamaica and then went on loan to Hearts, before joining Preston North End. He scored 27 goals in 58 League game at Preston, which prompted Portsmouth to pay £1 million for his services. Fuller failed to make an impact at Portsmouth and joined rivals Southampton in 2005 before Stoke City signed him for £500,000 in August 2006.

At Stoke, he became an influential member of the first team and his goals helped the "Potters" gain promotion to the Premier League in 2008. He remained a key figure in the top-flight, despite a poor disciplinary record, and helped Stoke reach the 2011 FA Cup Final, but missed out on the final due to injury. After he recovered from his injury he was only given a bit-part role and he left the club in June 2012 for a one-season stay with Charlton Athletic. He spent the 2013–14 season with Blackpool and 2014–15 with Millwall. He joined Oldham Athletic in October 2015.

Fuller played 77 international matches for the Jamaica national team between 1999 and 2012.

== Club career ==
=== Crystal Palace ===
Fuller was born in Kingston, Jamaica, and began his career with Tivoli Gardens. He had a trial with Charlton Athletic, playing in three reserve team matches. He moved to English club Crystal Palace in February 2001 for a possible fee of £1 million (the exact figure being dependent on appearances), after impressing on trial the previous month. At the time of his transfer he was suspended by the Jamaican football authority for kicking a Wadadah player in the head. He suffered from knee problems, and played just eight games for the "Eagles". He returned to Tivoli at the end of the campaign after failing to settle in London.

Fuller spent the next season 2001–02 on loan at Scottish Premier League club Hearts. He had an instant impact, scoring 8 goals in 27 appearances, and finishing as the club's joint top-scorer with Kevin McKenna. However, the Edinburgh-based club could not afford to sign Fuller on a permanent basis.

=== Preston North End ===
Preston North End stepped in to sign the striker, paying £500,000. Fuller scored on his Preston debut, a 2–1 defeat at home to old club Crystal Palace, and soon became a vital team player. He had an explosive scoring rate, but unfortunately he suffered knee ligament damage in early December, which ended his season prematurely. He had scored 11 goals in only 20 appearances for the club. A fit again Fuller began the 2003–04 season on fire, including a run of six goals in five games, but his form tailed off as his knee troubled him once more. Despite this, he still scored 19 goals that season to become the club's top-scorer. Fuller handed in a transfer request in June 2004 to force through a move to a Premiership club.

=== Portsmouth ===
Both Leeds United and Portsmouth then displayed their interest, however, Fuller's knee problems meant both clubs withdrew their offers after he failed medicals. However, Portsmouth manager Harry Redknapp was still keen on the Jamaican and Pompey negotiated a 'pay-as-you-play' deal with Fuller, meaning they would not lose a great deal of money should his recurring knee injuries force him to miss long periods of seasons. Fuller moved to Fratton Park in August 2004 for £1 million, after scoring 31 goals in only 63 appearances for Preston.

Fuller failed to make a huge impact in the Premier League, falling down the pecking order as the season progressed. Despite the sale of some of his fellow strikers at the end of the season, the return from long-term injury by strikers Vincent Péricard and Svetoslav Todorov, and the purchase of Collins Mbesuma, meant Fuller was not guaranteed first team football at Portsmouth and new manager Alain Perrin agreed to let Fuller go. A move to Sunderland fell through when Fuller failed a medical. Instead he was re-united with Harry Redknapp, who signed him for Southampton for £90,000. He scored once in his time at Portsmouth, in a 3–1 win over Crystal Palace.

=== Southampton ===
His start at Southampton was fairly dramatic, scoring Saints' only goal at Coventry on 29 August 2005, and scoring again at Derby on 18 September. After that his career at Saints declined. His perceived lack of effort and his history as a former Portsmouth player, combined with the general air of dissatisfaction at St. Mary's led to Fuller receiving a considerable amount of abuse from large sections of the home crowd. In February 2006, he went on loan to Ipswich Town, where he had an eventful time. In three games, he scored two goals, collected two yellow cards and one red card in the 2–2 draw at Crystal Palace, for a hand gesture at the crowd. He returned to Southampton at the end of March.

On his return to Southampton, he was a changed player and in the final six games of the season he scored six goals, which won him the Championship Player of the Month award for April. This took his season's tally to nine goals, making him the club's top-scorer. Despite this, he did not fit into George Burley's plans for 2006–07 and was transferred to Stoke City on transfer deadline day, 31 August 2006.

=== Stoke City ===
Fuller joined Stoke City for a fee of around £500,000, although a significant percentage of the fee depended on the number of appearances that he made for the "Potters". In his first season at Stoke he was the top goalscorer with 11 goals, but he also had the worst disciplinary record, accumulating two red cards and ten yellow cards.

In the 2007–08 season, Fuller became a vital part of Stoke promotion winning side becoming a firm fan favourite in the process. Fuller missed Stoke's home game against Hull City as he was attending the funeral of his grandmother in his home nation of Jamaica. Fuller signed a new contract in December 2007 keeping his contracted at the club until 2011. He scored 15 goals during the 2007–08 season as Stoke won promotion to the Premier League, he also won the club's goal of the season award for his solo effort against Wolverhampton Wanderers.

Fuller scored Stoke City's first-ever Premier League goal, a late consolation in a 3–1 defeat to Bolton Wanderers on the opening day of the 2008–09 season. He followed this up with another goal in Stoke's 3–2 win over Aston Villa in their first ever Premier League home match. This goal won Match of the Day's Goal of the Month for August. and also earned the praise from manager Tony Pulis.

Fuller was sent off for violent conduct on 28 December 2008 against West Ham United. Following West Ham's equaliser, Fuller argued with team-mate Andy Griffin, before slapping the Stoke captain's face. Referee Mike Jones gave Fuller a straight red for violent conduct and West Ham went on to win the match 2–1. Tony Pulis and Stoke teammate Danny Higginbotham commented that the incident would not affect the club. On 1 January 2009, Tony Pulis confirmed that Fuller and Griffin had "kissed and made up" after a team meeting. Fuller said Griffin had been "very rude and disrespectful", but accepted that his actions had been worse. In a match against Sunderland in February 2009 Fuller dislocated his shoulder and it was feared that he would be out injured for the rest of the season. However Fuller made a quick recovery and was out for just two weeks. He bounced back with lively performances against Aston Villa and a goal against Bolton and continued his form to help Stoke to safety.

After a slow start to the 2009–10 season for Fuller's standards, Pulis told the Jamaican he needs to lose weight. He scored 2 goals against Arsenal in the 4th round of the FA Cup in a 3–1 win over Arsenal on 24 January 2010, and also in the next round against Manchester City. Despite not being as prolific in front of goal Fuller won the goal of the season award for the third time in a row with another solo effort this time against West Ham United when he tricked his way past three hammers defenders before slotting past Rob Green.

Fuller scored his first goal of the 2010–11 season against Tottenham Hotspur at the Britannia Stadium. He then dislocated his shoulder for the second time in his Stoke career away at Newcastle United and then suffered a repeat injury in the next away match at Bolton. He made his 150th league appearance for Stoke on 6 November 2010 against Sunderland. Fuller scored his 100th goal in British football on 9 November against Birmingham City with another sole effort. In the January transfer window there was strong rumours that Fuller would be leaving Stoke to join Sunderland. However Sunderland denied that they made a bid for Fuller. Following the 5–0 FA Cup semi-final win over Bolton Wanderers Stoke captain Ryan Shawcross revealed that a speech from Fuller inspired the team. In the next match against Aston Villa Fuller sustained an Achilles tendon injury and missed the rest of the 2010–11 season including the 2011 FA Cup Final.

Fuller made his return from injury against Queens Park Rangers on 19 November 2011. He scored his 50th goal for Stoke against Beşiktaş in the UEFA Europa League in December 2011. He made his first Premier League start for Stoke on 10 March 2012 away at Chelsea, Fuller was sent-off after 24 minutes after stamping on Branislav Ivanović, Stoke went on to lose 1–0. Manager Pulis described Fuller's actions as 'ridiculous'. He left Stoke at the end of the 2011–12 season following the expiration of his contract.

=== Later career ===
Fuller joined Championship side Charlton Athletic on 22 August 2012 signing a one-year contract, with the option of a further year. Fuller was given the number 19 shirt, and made his debut as a substitute in an away fixture at Nottingham Forest. He scored important goals away at Ipswich Town and Crystal Palace, in addition to a 25-yard strike at home to Peterborough United. Fuller suffered several injuries, but was one of Charlton's six goal scorers in a record 6–0 away win at relegation threatened Barnsley. Despite helping Charlton to a ninth-placed finish in their first season back in the second tier of English football since 2009, he was released by Charlton at the end of the 2012–13 season. On 15 August 2013 Fuller signed a one-year contract with Championship club Blackpool with an option of an extra year. He scored six goals in 28 appearances for Blackpool during the 2013–14 season. Fuller joined Millwall on a one-year contract on 16 July 2014. He played 40 times for the Lions scoring six goals as they suffered relegation from the Championship.

Fuller signed a three-month contract with Oldham Athletic on 16 October 2015, following a successful trial. He left Oldham in January 2016. Fuller announced his retirement on 16 May 2016. However, in January 2019, it was announced that Fuller had signed for Nantwich Town. He re-signed for the club in November 2019. Fuller signed for Hanley Town on 31 August 2020. On 22 September, he scored the winner in an FA Cup tie, helping his side to a 3–2 win over Redditch United, which would mark the first time in their history that Hanley had reached the FA Second Qualifying Round.

== International career ==
Fuller was a member of the Jamaica Under 20 national team in 1998. He eventually was called up to the senior national team in 1999. Fuller has been involved in Jamaica's 2002, 2006 and 2010 World Cup campaigns and also featured in the 2005 and 2009 CONCACAF Gold Cup competitions.

== Coaching career ==
In October 2022, Fuller returned to Stoke, working as a coach in their youth academy after gaining his coaching licence via the Premier League's professional player to coach scheme.

== Personal life ==
Fuller was raised by his grandmother in the Tivoli Gardens section of Kingston, Jamaica. With his football earnings, Fuller was able to rebuild his grandmother's house after it was destroyed in early 2010 due to the riots in Jamaica. Fuller was arrested in February 2009 on suspicion of committing driving offences. He later pleaded guilty to driving without a UK licence and was fined and handed three penalty points. Fuller was arrested in February 2010 on suspicion of assault. He did not face any charges over the incident.

In November 2022, Stoke City renamed their renovated sports bar at the bet365 Stadium Ricardo's in honour of Fuller.

== Club statistics ==
=== Club ===
Appearances and goals by club, season and competition
Club	Season	League			FA Cup		League Cup		Europe		Other		Total	
Club	Season	Division	Apps	Goals	Apps	Goals	Apps	Goals	Apps	Goals	Apps	Goals	Apps	Goals
Crystal Palace	2000–01	First Division	8	0	0	0	0	0	—		—		8	0
Tivoli Gardens	2000–01	National Premier League	16	12	—		—		—		—		16	12
Heart of Midlothian (loan)	2001–02	Scottish Premier League	27	8	2	2	0	0	—		—		29	10
Preston North End	2002–03	First Division	18	9	0	0	2	2	—		—		20	11
Preston North End	2003–04	First Division	38	17	2	2	1	0	—		—		41	19
Preston North End	2004–05	Championship	2	1	0	0	0	0	—		—		2	1
Preston North End	Total		58	27	2	2	3	2	—		—		63	31
Portsmouth	2004–05	Premier League	31	1	2	0	4	0	—		—		37	1
Southampton	2005–06	Championship	30	9	1	0	0	0	—		—		31	9
Southampton	2006–07	Championship	1	0	0	0	1	0	—		—		2	0
Southampton	Total		31	9	1	0	1	0	—		—		33	9
Ipswich Town (loan)	2005–06	Championship	3	2	—		—		—		—		3	2
Stoke City	2006–07	Championship	30	10	2	1	0	0	—		—		32	11
Stoke City	2007–08	Championship	42	15	2	0	0	0	—		—		44	15
Stoke City	2008–09	Premier League	34	11	0	0	3	0	—		—		37	11
Stoke City	2009–10	Premier League	35	3	5	4	1	1	—		—		41	8
Stoke City	2010–11	Premier League	28	4	6	0	2	0	—		—		36	4
Stoke City	2011–12	Premier League	13	0	2	0	0	0	3 (Note: Appearances in UEFA Europa League)	1	—		18	1
Stoke City	Total		182	43	17	5	6	1	3	1	—		208	50
Charlton Athletic	2012–13	Championship	31	5	0	0	0	0	—		—		31	5
Blackpool	2013–14	Championship	27	6	1	0	0	0	—		—		28	6
Millwall	2014–15	Championship	38	4	2	2	0	0	—		—		40	6
Oldham Athletic	2015–16	League One	5	0	2	0	0	0	—		0	0	7	0
Nantwich Town	2018–19	Northern Premier League Premier Division	8	1	—		—		—		4 (Note: Three appearances in Cheshire Senior Cup, one appearance in Northern Premier League Premier Division play-offs)	0	12	1
Nantwich Town	2019–20	Northern Premier League Premier Division	13	3	—		—		—		0	0	13	3
Nantwich Town	Total		21	4	—		—		—		4	0	25	4
Hanley Town	2020–21	North West Counties League Premier Division	0	0	3	1	—		—		1 (Note: Appearances in FA Vase)	0	4	1
Career total			478	121	32	12	14	3	3	1	5	0	532	137

=== International ===
National team	Year	Apps	Goals
Jamaica	1999	19	3
Jamaica	2000	1	0
Jamaica	2001	9	0
Jamaica	2002	3	1
Jamaica	2003	3	1
Jamaica	2004	11	0
Jamaica	2005	5	2
Jamaica	2006	4	0
Jamaica	2007	3	1
Jamaica	2008	9	2
Jamaica	2009	4	0
Jamaica	2010	1	0
Jamaica	2011	0	0
Jamaica	2012	4	0
Total		76	10

== Honours ==
Stoke City

- Football League Championship second-place promotion: 2007–08

Nantwich Town

- Cheshire Senior Cup: 2018–19

Individual

- Scottish Premier League Player of the Month: December 2001
- Football League Championship Player of the Month: April 2006
- PFA Team of the Year: 2007–08 Championship
