= 2004–05 Portsmouth F.C. season =

Portsmouth
2004–05 season
- Chairman: Milan Mandaric
- Manager: Harry Redknapp (until 24 November); Velimir Zajec (from 24 November to April); Alain Perrin (from 7 April)
- Stadium: Fratton Park
- Premier League: 16th
- FA Cup: Fourth round
- League Cup: Quarter-finals
- Top goalscorer: League: Yakubu (13); All: Yakubu (17)
- Highest home attendance: 20,210 (in 2 matches) vs. Chelsea (28 December 2004) vs Southampton (24 April 2005)
- Lowest home attendance: 19,620 vs. Middlesbrough (1 February 2005)
- Average home league attendance: 19,915
Home colours	Away colours

During the 2004–05 English football season, Portsmouth competed in the FA Premier League. It was Portsmouth's second consecutive season in English football's top-flight.

== Season summary ==
Portsmouth's campaign got off to a good start, winning four of their first ten games including the famous, brilliant 2–0 win over Manchester United as they maintained a strong mid-table position in late October. However, manager Harry Redknapp walked out on Portsmouth in November after a row with chairman Milan Mandaric over the appointment of new Director of Football Velimir Zajec at the club. Zajec replaced Redknapp as manager with immediate effect, but under his management the club's form dipped, bringing the club from the top ten to a few points above the relegation zone. In April, Zajec was replaced by Frenchman Alain Perrin; Perrin managed to secure Portsmouth's Premiership status with a few games of the season left. Despite this, Portsmouth still played a pivotal role in the "Survival Sunday" relegation drama - by losing 2–0 at West Bromwich Albion they both secured Albion's Premiership status and helped relegate arch-rivals Southampton (although Southampton were beaten 2–1 at home by Manchester United and would have been relegated even if Albion had lost).

== Final league table ==
Pos	Team	Pld	W	D	L	GF	GA	GD	Pts	Qualification or relegation
14	Newcastle United	38	10	14	14	47	57	−10	44	Qualification for the Intertoto Cup third round
15	Blackburn Rovers	38	9	15	14	32	43	−11	42	
16	Portsmouth	38	10	9	19	43	59	−16	39	
17	West Bromwich Albion	38	6	16	16	36	61	−25	34	
18	Crystal Palace (R)	38	7	12	19	41	62	−21	33	Relegation to the Football League Championship

Rules for classification: 1) points; 2) goal difference; 3) number of goals scored.
(R) Relegated

== Kit ==
Portsmouth retained the previous season's kit, manufactured under the club's own brand, Pompey Sport.

== First-team squad ==
Squad at end of season

Note: Flags indicate national team as defined under FIFA eligibility rules; some limited exceptions apply. Players may hold more than one non-FIFA nationality.

No.	Pos.	Nation	Player
1	GK	TRI	Shaka Hislop
2	DF	ENG	Linvoy Primus
3	DF	SCG	Dejan Stefanović
4	DF	ENG	David Unsworth
6	DF	NED	Arjan de Zeeuw
8	MF	ENG	Steve Stone
11	MF	GRE	Giannis Skopelitis (on loan from Egaleo)
14	MF	ENG	Matthew Taylor
16	DF	ENG	Andy Griffin
18	MF	SEN	Aliou Cissé
19	FW	JAM	Ricardo Fuller

No.	Pos.	Nation	Player
20	FW	NGA	Yakubu
21	FW	SEN	Diomansy Kamara
22	MF	SCO	Richard Hughes
23	MF	CZE	Patrik Berger
26	MF	ENG	Gary O'Neil
27	FW	SVN	Aleksandar Rodić
28	FW	ENG	James Keene
30	GK	ENG	Jamie Ashdown
32	FW	COD	Lomana Tresor LuaLua
33	GK	GRE	Kostas Chalkias
34	MF	CMR	Valéry Mézague (on loan from Montpellier)

=== Left club during season ===
Note: Flags indicate national team as defined under FIFA eligibility rules; some limited exceptions apply. Players may hold more than one non-FIFA nationality.

No.	Pos.	Nation	Player
7	MF	SCO	Kevin Harper (to Stoke City)
10	MF	ISR	Eyal Berkovic (released)
11	MF	SCO	Nigel Quashie (to Southampton)
15	MF	SEN	Amdy Faye (to Newcastle United)
25	GK	NED	Harald Wapenaar (to Vitesse Arnhem)
27	DF	ENG	Eddie Howe (to AFC Bournemouth)
28	DF	ENG	John Curtis (to Nottingham Forest)

No.	Pos.	Nation	Player
31	DF	FRA	Sebastian Schemmel (released)
33	DF	ENG	Lewis Buxton (to Stoke City)
36	MF	ENG	Anthony Pulis (to Stoke City)
37	MF	CRO	Ivica Mornar (on loan to Rennes)
13	FW	ENG	Rowan Vine (on loan to Luton Town)
29	FW	SCO	Mark Burchill (to Hearts)

== Reserve squad ==
Note: Flags indicate national team as defined under FIFA eligibility rules; some limited exceptions apply. Players may hold more than one non-FIFA nationality.

No.	Pos.	Nation	Player
5	DF	AUS	Hayden Foxe
9	FW	BUL	Svetoslav Todorov
17	FW	FRA	Vincent Péricard

No.	Pos.	Nation	Player
24	DF	WAL	Richard Duffy
29	GK	ITA	Andrea Guatelli

== Transfers ==
=== In ===
- (England) Andy Griffin - (England) Newcastle United, free, 26 May 2004
- (England) Jamie Ashdown - (England) Reading, June 2004, undisclosed
- (England) David Unsworth - (England) Everton, free, 12 July 2004
- (Democratic Republic of the Congo) Lomana LuaLua - (England) Newcastle United, undisclosed (estimated £1,750,000), 12 July 2004
- (Italy) Andrea Guatelli - (Italy) Fiorenzuola, free, 2 August 2004
- (Senegal) Aliou Cissé - (England) Birmingham City, £300,000, 6 August 2004
- (Jamaica) Ricardo Fuller - (England) Preston North End, £1,000,000, 20 August 2004
- (Senegal) Diomansy Kamara - (Italy) Modena, £2,500,000, 30 August 2004
- (Cameroon) Valéry Mézague - (France) Montpellier, season loan, 31 August 2004
- (Greece) Giannis Skopelitis - (Greece) Egaleo, 28 January 2005, season loan with option of making permanent, £300,000 rising to £1,000,000 if made permanent
- (Greece) Kostas Chalkias - (Greece) Panathinaikos, 28 January 2005, nominal fee
- (Slovenia) Aleksander Rodić - (Slovenia) NK Gorica, 31 January 2005, undisclosed

=== Out ===
- (England) Tim Sherwood - (England) Coventry City, free, 9 July 2004
- (England) Teddy Sheringham (England) West Ham United, free, 14 July 2004
- (Jamaica) Deon Burton - (England) Brentford, undisclosed, 16 July 2004 (officially joined 1 August)
- (Croatia) Ivica Mornar - (France) Rennes, season loan, 8 August 2004
- (England) Eddie Howe - (England) AFC Bournemouth, free, 12 November 2004
- (England) Lewis Buxton - (England) Stoke City, 24 December 2004
- (Wales) Anthony Pulis - (England) Stoke City, 24 December 2004
- (England) John Curtis - (England) Nottingham Forest, free, January 2005
- (Scotland) Nigel Quashie - (England) Southampton, £2,100,000, 17 January 2005
- (Senegal) Amdy Faye - (England) Newcastle United, £2,000,000, 23 January 2005
- (England) Kevin Harper - (England) Stoke City, undisclosed, 1 February 2005
- (Israel) Eyal Berkovic - (Israel) Maccabi Tel Aviv, 4 February 2005
- (England) David Unsworth - (England) Ipswich Town, four-month loan, 15 February 2005
- (England) Alan Knight - retired, 2004
- (England) Warren Hunt - (England) Fareham Town, 2004
- (Poland) Sebastian Olszar - (Poland) Polonia Warsaw, 2004
- (Wales) Carl Robinson - (England) Sunderland, 2004
- (France) Sébastien Schemmel - (France) Le Havre, December 2004
- (Netherlands) Harald Wapenaar - (Netherlands) Vitesse Arnhem, 2005
- (England) Rowan Vine - (England) Luton Town, loan, 2004
- (Scotland) Mark Burchill - (Scotland) Hearts, loan

Transfers in: ▼£5,750,000
Transfers out: ▲£4,100,000
Total spending: ▼£1,650,000

== Results ==
=== Results per matchday ===
Matchday	1	2	3	4	5	6	7	8	9	10	11	12	13	14	15	16	17	18	19	20	21	22	23	24	25	26	27	28	29	30	31	32	33	34	35	36	37	38
Ground	H	A	H	H	A	H	A	H	A	H	A	A	H	A	H	A	A	H	A	H	H	A	H	A	H	A	H	A	A	H	A	H	A	H	H	A	H	A
Result	D	L	W	W	L	L	D	W	D	W	L	L	L	W	W	D	D	L	W	L	D	L	L	L	W	L	L	L	L	D	L	W	D	L	W	L	D	L
Position	12	18	11	9	11	14	13	12	11	9	10	11	12	11	9	10	10	12	9	10	11	12	13	14	12	13	14	14	15	15	16	15	15	16	15	16	16	16

Source: WorldFootball.com
A = Away; H = Home; W = Win; D = Draw; L = Loss

=== Premiership ===
14 August 2004 1	Portsmouth	1–1	Birmingham City	Portsmouth, Hampshire
15:00 BST (UTC+01)	Unsworth 16' (pen.)	Report	Savage 10'	Stadium: Fratton Park; Attendance: 20,021; Referee: Howard Webb

21 August 2004 2	Charlton Athletic	2–1	Portsmouth	Greenwich, London
	Euell 23'; Unsworth 87' (o.g.)	Report	Berger 53'	Stadium: The Valley; Attendance: 25,204; Referee: Alan Wiley

30 August 2004 3	Portsmouth	4–3	Fulham	Portsmouth, Hampshire
	Berkovic 19'; Yakubu 21' (pen.)	Report	Cole 39'; Boa Morte 41'; Bocanegra 75'	Stadium: Fratton Park; Attendance: 19,728; Referee: Barry Knight

11 September 2004 4	Portsmouth	3–1	Crystal Palace	Portsmouth, Hampshire
	Fuller 3'; Berger 47'; Popovic 85' (o.g.)	Report	Granville 43'	Stadium: Fratton Park; Attendance: 20,019; Referee: Phil Dowd

18 September 2004 5	Blackburn Rovers	1–0	Portsmouth	Blackburn, Lancashire
	Jansen 75'	Report		Stadium: Ewood Park; Attendance: 20,647; Referee: Mark Clattenburg

26 September 2004 6	Portsmouth	0–1	Everton	Portsmouth, Hampshire
		Report	Cahill 80'	Stadium: Fratton Park; Attendance: 20,125; Referee: Dermot Gallagher

2 October 2004 7	Norwich City	2–2	Portsmouth	Norwich, Norfolk
15:00 BST (UTC+01)	Huckerby 63'; Charlton 67'	Report	Yakubu 37'; Berger 65'	Stadium: Carrow Road; Attendance: 23,853; Referee: Matt Messias

18 October 2004 8	Portsmouth	1–0	Tottenham Hotspur	Portsmouth, Hampshire
	Yakubu 63'	Report		Stadium: Fratton Park; Attendance: 20,121; Referee: Uriah Rennie

24 October 2004 9	Middlesbrough	1–1	Portsmouth	Middlesbrough, North Yorkshire
15:00 BST (UTC+01)	Downing 74'	Report	Kamara 5'	Stadium: Riverside Stadium; Attendance: 30,964; Referee: Martin Atkinson

30 October 2004 10	Portsmouth	2–0	Manchester United	Portsmouth, Hampshire
	Unsworth 53' (pen.); Yakubu 72'	Report		Stadium: Fratton Park; Attendance: 20,190; Referee: Neale Barry

6 November 2004 11	Aston Villa	3–0	Portsmouth	Birmingham, West Midlands
	Whittingham 18'; Ángel 25'; Solano 40'	Report		Stadium: Villa Park; Attendance: 32,633; Referee: Mark Halsey

13 November 2004 12	Southampton	2–1	Portsmouth	Southampton, Hampshire
	Blackstock 18'; Phillips 71'	Report	Jakobsson 12' (o.g.)	Stadium: St Mary's Stadium; Attendance: 30,921; Referee: Graham Poll

20 November 2004 13	Portsmouth	1–3	Manchester City	Portsmouth, Hampshire
	O'Neil 8'	Report	Wright-Phillips 6'; Sibierski 79'; Bosvelt 87'	Stadium: Fratton Park; Attendance: 20,101; Referee: Matt Messias

27 November 2004 14	Bolton Wanderers	0–1	Portsmouth	Bolton, Greater Manchester
		Report	De Zeeuw 45'	Stadium: Reebok Stadium; Attendance: 25,008; Referee: Steve Dunn

4 December 2004 15	Portsmouth	3–2	West Bromwich Albion	Portsmouth, Hampshire
	Purse 35' (o.g.); De Zeeuw 85'; LuaLua 89'	Report	Stefanovic 14' (o.g.); Earnshaw 45'	Stadium: Fratton Park; Attendance: 20,110; Referee: Peter Walton

11 December 2004 16	Newcastle United	1–1	Portsmouth	Newcastle upon Tyne, Tyneside
	Bowyer 3'	Report	Stone 30'	Stadium: St James' Park; Attendance: 51,480; Referee: Mike Riley

14 December 2004 17	Liverpool	1–1	Portsmouth	Liverpool, Merseyside
	Gerrard 70'	Report	LuaLua 90'	Stadium: Anfield; Attendance: 35,064; Referee: Mark Clattenburg

19 December 2004 18	Portsmouth	0–1	Arsenal	Portsmouth, Hampshire
		Report	Campbell 75'	Stadium: Fratton Park; Attendance: 20,170; Referee: Howard Webb

26 December 2004 19	Crystal Palace	0–1	Portsmouth	Croydon, London
		Report	Primus 69'	Stadium: Selhurst Park; Attendance: 25,238; Referee: Neale Barry

28 December 2004 20	Portsmouth	0–2	Chelsea	Portsmouth, Hampshire
		Report	Robben 79'; Cole 90'	Stadium: Fratton Park; Attendance: 20,210; Referee: Alan Wiley

1 January 2005 21	Portsmouth	1–1	Norwich City	Portsmouth, Hampshire
15:00 GMT	Yakubu 61' (pen.)	Report	Edworthy (red card) 5'; Francis 9'	Stadium: Fratton Park; Attendance: 20,015; Referee: Phil Dowd

4 January 2005 22	Everton	2–1	Portsmouth	Liverpool, Merseyside
	Stubbs 29'; Osman 90'	Report	Yakubu 31'	Stadium: Goodison Park; Attendance: 35,480; Referee: Peter Walton

15 January 2005 23	Portsmouth	0–1	Blackburn Rovers	Portsmouth, Hampshire
15:00 GMT	LuaLua (red card) 51'; Faye (red card) 90'	Report	Pedersen 55'	Stadium: Fratton Park; Attendance: 19,904; Referee: Andy D'Urso

22 January 2005 24	Chelsea	3–0	Portsmouth	Fulham, London
	Drogba 15', 39'; Robben 21'	Report		Stadium: Stamford Bridge; Attendance: 42,267; Referee: Mike Riley

1 February 2005 25	Portsmouth	2–1	Middlesbrough	Portsmouth, Hampshire
	Taylor 40'; Yakubu 58'	Report	Christie 35'	Stadium: Fratton Park; Attendance: 19,620; Referee: Phil Crossley

5 February 2005 26	Tottenham Hotspur	3–1	Portsmouth	Tottenham, London
15:00 GMT	Mido 34', 57'; Keane 83'	Report	Kamara 28'	Stadium: White Hart Lane; Referee: Steve Dunn

12 February 2005 27	Portsmouth	1–2	Aston Villa	Portsmouth, Hampshire
15:00 GMT	Yakubu 24' (pen.)	Report	De Zeeuw 17' (o.g.); Hitzlsperger 73'	Stadium: Fratton Park; Attendance: 20,160; Referee: Dermot Gallagher

26 February 2005 28	Manchester United	2–1	Portsmouth	Trafford, Greater Manchester
	Rooney 8', 81'	Report	O'Neil 47'	Stadium: Old Trafford; Attendance: 67,989; Referee: Mark Halsey

5 March 2005 29	Arsenal	3–0	Portsmouth	Islington, London
	Henry 39', 53', 85'	Report		Stadium: Highbury; Attendance: 38,079; Referee: Chris Foy

19 March 2005 30	Portsmouth	1–1	Newcastle United	Portsmouth, Hampshire
	Stone 45'	Report	Dyer 43'	Stadium: Fratton Park; Attendance: 20,165; Referee: Matt Messias

3 April 2005 31	Fulham	3–1	Portsmouth	Fulham, London
	Cole 63'; McBride 81'; Boa Morte 90'	Report	LuaLua 32'	Stadium: Craven Cottage; Attendance: 20,502; Referee: Mark Clattenburg

9 April 2005 32	Portsmouth	4–2	Charlton Athletic	Portsmouth, Hampshire
BST (UTC+01)	Yakubu 3'; Stone 20'; Kamara 83'; LuaLua 90'	Report	Fortune 22'; Murphy 45'	Stadium: Fratton Park; Attendance: 20,108; Referee: Graham Poll

16 April 2005 33	Birmingham City	0–0	Portsmouth	Birmingham, West Midlands
17:15 BST (UTC+01)		Report		Stadium: St Andrew's; Attendance: 28,883; Referee: Peter Walton

20 April 2005 34	Portsmouth	1–2	Liverpool	Portsmouth, Hampshire
	Kamara 34'	Report	Morientes 4'; Luis García 45'	Stadium: Fratton Park; Attendance: 20,205; Referee: Howard Webb

24 April 2005 35	Portsmouth	4–1	Southampton	Portsmouth, Hampshire
	Yakubu 4' (pen.); De Zeeuw 17'; LuaLua 22', 27'	Report	Camara 20'	Stadium: Fratton Park; Attendance: 20,210; Referee: Steve Dunn

30 April 2005 36	Manchester City	2–0	Portsmouth	Manchester, Greater Manchester
15:00 BST (UTC+01)	Distin 4'; Fowler 16'	Report		Stadium: City of Manchester Stadium; Attendance: 46,454; Referee: Martin Atkinson

7 May 2005 37	Portsmouth	1–1	Bolton Wanderers	Portsmouth, Hampshire
	Yakubu 72'	Report	Diouf 11'	Stadium: Fratton Park; Attendance: 20,188; Referee: Matt Messias

15 May 2005 38	West Bromwich Albion	2–0	Portsmouth	West Bromwich, West Midlands
	Horsfield 58'; Richardson 75'	Report		Stadium: The Hawthorns; Attendance: 27,751; Referee: Mike Riley

=== FA Cup ===
- Third round: Portsmouth 1-0 Gillingham (Yakubu 49)
- Fourth round: Southampton 2-1 Portsmouth (Oakley 54, Crouch 90 pen.; Yakubu 57 pen.)

=== League Cup ===
- Second round: Tranmere Rovers 0-1 Portsmouth (Kamara 65)
- Third round: Portsmouth 2-1 Leeds United (Kamara 14, Berkovic 32 pen.; Deane 40)
- Fourth round: Cardiff City 0-2 Portsmouth (Yakubu 47, 55 pen.)
- Quarter-finals: Watford 3-0 Portsmouth (Helguson 24, 57, Dyer 61)
