= Joseph Musa =

Anglican bishop in Nigeria

Joseph Musa is an Anglican bishop in Nigeria: since his consecration on 13 March 2005 he has been the Bishop of Idah, one of seventeen within the Anglican Province of Abuja, itself one of 14 provinces within the Church of Nigeria.
