= Moses Tabwaye =

Anglican bishop in Nigeria

Moses Bukpe Tabwaye is an Anglican in Nigeria: he is the current Bishop of Gwagwalada, one of 13 dioceses within the Anglican Province of Abuja, itself one of 14 provinces within the Church of Nigeria.

He was consecrated Bishop of Gwagwalada in 2015 at All Saints Cathedral Church Onitsha, taking over from Philip Aduda.
