= Miller Maza =

Anglican bishop in Nigeria

Miller Maza is an Anglican bishop in Nigeria: he was the Bishop of Lafia one of 13 dioceses within the Anglican Province of Abuja, itself one of 14 provinces within the Church of Nigeria.

He retired in 2017.
