= Nigel Quashie =

Scottish footballer (born 1978)

Personal information
- Full name: Nigel Francis Quashie
- Date of birth: 20 July 1978 (age 48)
- Place of birth: Southwark, England
- Height: 5 ft 9 in (1.75 m)
- Position: Midfielder

Senior career*
Years	Team	Apps	(Gls)
1995–1998	Queens Park Rangers	57	(3)
1998–2000	Nottingham Forest	44	(2)
2000–2005	Portsmouth	148	(13)
2005–2006	Southampton	37	(5)
2006–2007	West Bromwich Albion	29	(1)
2007–2010	West Ham United	7	(0)
2008–2009	→ Birmingham City (loan)	10	(0)
2009	→ Wolverhampton Wanderers (loan)	3	(0)
2009–2010	→ Milton Keynes Dons (loan)	7	(2)
2010	Queens Park Rangers	4	(0)
2012	ÍR	20	(2)
2013–2015	BÍ/Bolungarvík	37	(9)
Total		403	(37)

International career
1995	England U18	1	(0)
1997–1998	England U21	4	(0)
1998	England B	1	(0)
2004–2006	Scotland	14	(1)

Managerial career
- 2012: ÍR (player–manager)
- 2013–2015: BÍ/Bolungarvík (player–assistant manager)
- * Club domestic league appearances and goals

Nigel Francis Quashie (/ˈkwɑːzi/ KWAH-zee; born 20 July 1978) is a Scottish footballer who played more than 300 games as a midfielder in the Football League. He also spent four seasons playing in Iceland. He represented his native England at under-21 and 'B' international level before switching allegiance to Scotland, the country of his grandfather. Between 2004 and 2006, he played at full international level on 14 occasions, and became the first non-white player to score for the Scotland senior team.

== Personal life ==
Quashie was born in the London Borough of Southwark to a Ghanaian father and an English mother. He and his former wife, Joanna, had a son, who died shortly after birth, and a daughter. He and his partner, Kerry Clarke, have a son, Brayden Clarke, who as of 2024 is a youth footballer for Arsenal and for Wales, for which he qualifies through his mother's parentage.

== Club career ==
=== Queens Park Rangers ===
He began his career in London as a trainee with Queens Park Rangers in August 1995, making his League debut in a 2–1 defeat against Manchester United at Old Trafford on 30 December. He was used sparingly for the remainder of that campaign, making eleven appearances as QPR were relegated from the Premier League at the end of the 1995–96 season. He made a further 14 appearances in the 1996–97 season before breaking into the first eleven on a regular basis in the 1997–98 season when he made 35 league and cup appearances.

=== Nottingham Forest ===
Quashie joined Nottingham Forest for £2.5 million at the start of the 1998–99 FA Premier League season but made only 16 league appearances as Forest finished bottom of the table. He settled into the team in the 1999–2000 season, making 34 appearances, but the death of his son had a major impact on his ability to perform, and he was transfer-listed by manager David Platt at the end of a season in which Forest finished well short of the promotion places. By July, he reportedly had attracted interest from several clubs, including West Bromwich Albion and Birmingham City with Portsmouth understood to have made an offer.

=== Portsmouth ===
Quashie joined Portsmouth in August 2000 for a fee worth up to £600,000, signing a three-year contract. He quickly established himself in the first team, making 37 league and cup appearances in the 2001–02 season as Portsmouth finished in the lower half of the First Division. He made a further 44 appearances in the 2002–03 season and was club vice-captain when Portsmouth won the First Division championship and were promoted to the Premier League. No sooner had Quashie returned from several weeks out with a knee injury in December 2003 than he twisted his other knee leading him to miss a further seven weeks of the 2003–04 season. He remained a first-choice player, making 25 appearances (21 starts) in all competition as Portsmouth claimed 13th place in the Premier League. Although a regular starter in first half of the 2004–05 season as well as captain, he had not been offered a new deal despite being out of contract at the end of the season and joined former Portsmouth manager, Harry Redknapp, at Southampton during the January 2005 transfer window.

=== Southampton ===
Quashie joined Southampton for a fee of £2.1 million in January 2005, signing a three-and-a-half-year contract. He said, "It's a big move for me and I am happy to be linking up with Harry Redknapp again. I am certain we will stay up – I would not have come here if I had any doubts about that, but we need to get a few results quickly." The chairman of Southampton, Rupert Lowe, said, "Harry really wanted Nigel – he thinks he is a strong character who will add to the dressing room. We are delighted to make him our third signing since Harry arrived." A training ground injury prevented Quashie from making his debut against Liverpool on 22 January 2005 and he did not appear until the match against Everton on 6 February.

After the transfer of Jason Dodd, he became the club's captain but he was unable to prevent the Saints being relegated at the end of the 2004–05 season. Despite relegation, Quashie said that he had no regrets over the move to Southampton as he had been unhappy with the way he had been treated at Portsmouth. However, following Redknapp's departure and his replacement with George Burley, Quashie was allowed to leave Southampton in the January 2006 transfer window.

=== West Bromwich Albion ===
Quashie joined West Bromwich Albion in January 2006 for £1.2 million, signing a three-and-a-half-year contract. Manager Bryan Robson, "I always liked Nigel when he played for QPR, Portsmouth and Southampton. He is intelligent, has good stamina and is a very good passer of the ball. He has got the experience now of relegation fights and playing in the Premiership. I just feel he will improve our squad." He made his debut for Albion in a 2–0 Premier League win over Blackburn Rovers on 4 February 2006. He was charged with misconduct by the Football Association after being sent off against Middlesbrough three weeks later for alleged use of foul and abusive language towards the referee's assistants as he left the pitch and was given a one-game ban in addition to a four-game ban for the sending off, his second of the season, and a £5,000 fine after admitting misconduct. His only goal for the club came in a 3–1 defeat against Arsenal in April 2006. When Albion were relegated at the end of the season, Quashie achieved the rare distinction of two successive relegations from the Premiership. He was allowed to leave in the January 2007 transfer window as he expressed a wish to return to the Premier League and manager Tony Mowbray wanted to raise some revenue to bring in new players.

=== West Ham United ===
Quashie became Alan Curbishley's second signing of the transfer window when he joined West Ham United on a three-and-a-half-year contract for an initial fee of £1.5 million, rising to £1.75 million when West Ham avoided relegation from the 2006–07 Premier League. Curbishley explained that he had signed Quashie "because he is an experienced player who will add competition to our central midfield positions ... The competition for places is a factor that will be important to us as we fight to move up the table". Quashie made his debut against Fulham a few days later and went on to make eight appearances, none of them on the winning side, as West Ham battled against relegation.

A persistent foot injury meant that Quashie did not play a single competitive match during the 2007–08 season. He made his comeback in a pre-season friendly against Queens Park Rangers in August 2008. The signing of Swiss international Valon Behrami in the summer of 2008 and the emergence of academy graduates Jack Collison and Junior Stanislas meant that competition for midfield places was much stiffer, and Quashie spent much of the next 18 months out on loan.

==== Birmingham City ====
Quashie trained with Birmingham City of the Championship for several weeks to regain fitness before signing on loan, initially for a month, on 22 October 2008. He went straight into the squad for that day's match against Crystal Palace and made his debut as a second-half substitute. Despite missing the last game of his initial loan spell through suspension, having been sent off in the match against Charlton Athletic, the loan was extended for a further month, and again for a third and final month, until 17 January 2009. Quashie returned to West Ham on 19 January, having played 11 times for Birmingham.

==== Wolverhampton Wanderers ====
Quashie joined Championship club Wolverhampton Wanderers on 22 January 2009 on loan until the end of the season. He made three appearances for the team and was praised by manager Mick McCarthy for his leadership before quickly dropping out of contention as the club won promotion to the Premier League as champions.

==== Milton Keynes Dons ====
In November 2009, Quashie joined League One club Milton Keynes Dons on loan until 3 January 2010. He made a losing start to his MK Dons career, coming on in the first half for Luke Howell in the 4–3 home defeat to Carlisle United on 24 November. Quashie scored his first goal for MK Dons on 12 December in a 2–1 away win against Leyton Orient, and finished his loan spell with two goals from eight games.

=== Return to Queens Park Rangers ===
On 22 January 2010, Quashie was released by West Ham to return to his first professional club, Queens Park Rangers, on a free transfer. He said "It's great to be back home, and I am delighted to be at a club that I love to pieces". He made his second QPR debut in the 5–0 defeat at one of his former clubs, Nottingham Forest, and played just four times before being released at the end of the season.

=== Íþróttafélag Reykjavíkur ===
On 13 April 2012, Quashie joined 1. deild karla club Íþróttafélag Reykjavíkur on a two-year contract as both a player and as assistant manager to Andri Marteinsson. He is also a coach in the ÍR academy. Quashie made his league debut for ÍR on 12 May 2012 and scored the team's second goal in the 3–2 win against KA. Following the dismissal of Andri Marteinsson on 21 August with ÍR at the bottom of the division, Quashie was appointed to take charge of the team until the end of the season.

=== BÍ/Bolungarvík ===
In January 2013, Quashie signed a three-year contract with 1. deild karla club BÍ/Bolungarvík. He also served as assistant coach in all three seasons. He retired from playing football following the 2015 season.

== International career ==
=== England ===
Quashie played once for the England under-18 team in a European championship qualifier against Latvia in November 1995. He was a member of several England under-21 squads during the 1996–97 season before making his debut at that level on 30 May 1997 in the starting eleven for a European championship qualifier against Poland in Chorzów. The game ended as a 1–1 draw, and Quashie played in one more qualifier as England went on to top their group, but still faced a play-off against the other worst-ranked group winner, Greece. Quashie started the away leg, which England lost 2–0, but did not take the field in the home leg, which England won 4–2 on the night but lost on the away goals rule. He was selected for the England B team to face Chile in February 1998, a 2–1 defeat, but was injured after half an hour. His fourth and last under-21 appearance came a few weeks later in a friendly away to Switzerland.

=== Scotland ===
FIFA eligibility rules changed in 2004 to permit players to change their international allegiance. Quashie expressed interest in representing Scotland. He qualified because his maternal grandfather was born in Glasgow – a fact Quashie had to prove.

Quashie's Scotland debut was a 1–0 friendly win away against Estonia on 27 May 2004. He was only the second black player to represent Scotland (after Andrew Watson in 1881) and the third non-white man (after Paul Wilson in 1975). Quashie scored on his second appearance three days later, side footing home in the 34th minute to put his team 4-0 ahead v Trinidad and Tobago at Easter Road, Edinburgh. In doing so he became the first non-white player to score for the Scotland Men's National team. The Scots won 4-1. According to Scotland manager Berti Vogts, "Nigel is a fantastic player and a real leader on the pitch. He feels so Scottish and that's great." In total Quashie made 14 appearances for Scotland between 2004 and 2006, scoring once.

== Career statistics ==
=== Club ===
Appearances and goals by club, season and competition
Club	Season	League			National cup (Note: Includes FA Cup, Icelandic Cup)		League cup (Note: Includes Football League Cup, Icelandic League Cup)		Other		Total	
Club	Season	Division	Apps	Goals	Apps	Goals	Apps	Goals	Apps	Goals	Apps	Goals
Queens Park Rangers	1995–96	Premier League	11	0	2	2	0	0	—		13	2
Queens Park Rangers	1996–97	First Division	13	0	0	0	1	0	—		14	0
Queens Park Rangers	1997–98	First Division	33	3	2	0	0	0	—		35	3
Queens Park Rangers	Total		57	3	4	2	1	0	—		62	5
Nottingham Forest	1998–99	Premier League	16	0	1	0	2	0	—		19	0
Nottingham Forest	1999–2000	First Division	28	2	1	0	5	1	—		34	3
Nottingham Forest	Total		44	2	2	0	7	1	—		53	3
Portsmouth	2000–01	First Division	31	5	1	0	4	0	—		36	5
Portsmouth	2001–02	First Division	35	2	1	0	1	0	—		37	2
Portsmouth	2002–03	First Division	42	5	1	0	1	1	—		44	6
Portsmouth	2003–04	Premier League	21	1	3	0	1	0	—		25	1
Portsmouth	2004–05	Premier League	19	0	1	0	1	0	—		21	0
Portsmouth	Total		148	13	7	0	8	1	—		163	14
Southampton	2004–05	Premier League	13	1	—		—		—		13	1
Southampton	2005–06	Championship	24	4	1	1	0	0	—		25	5
Southampton	Total		37	5	1	1	0	0	—		38	6
West Bromwich Albion	2005–06	Premier League	9	1	—		—		—		9	1
West Bromwich Albion	2006–07	Championship	20	0	0	0	1	0	—		21	0
West Bromwich Albion	Total		29	1	0	0	1	0	—		30	1
West Ham United	2006–07	Premier League	7	0	1	0	—		—		8	0
West Ham United	2007–08	Premier League	0	0	0	0	0	0	—		0	0
West Ham United	2008–09	Premier League	0	0	0	0	0	0	—		0	0
West Ham United	2009–10	Premier League	0	0	—		0	0	—		0	0
West Ham United	Total		7	0	1	0	0	0	—		8	0
Birmingham City (loan)	2008–09	Championship	10	0	1	0	—		—		11	0
Wolverhampton Wanderers (loan)	2008–09	Championship	3	0	—		—		—		3	0
Milton Keynes Dons (loan)	2009–10	League One	7	2	0	0	—		1 (Note: Appearance in Football League Trophy)	0	8	2
Queens Park Rangers	2009–10	Championship	4	0	—		—		—		4	0
ÍR	2012	1. deild karla	20	2	1	0	—		—		21	2
BÍ/Bolungarvík	2013	1. deild karla	18	4	3	1	6	1	—		27	6
BÍ/Bolungarvík	2014	1. deild karla	12	4	1	0	4	0	—		17	4
BÍ/Bolungarvík	2015	1. deild karla	7	1	0	0	6	0	—		13	1
BÍ/Bolungarvík	Total		37	9	4	1	16	1	—		57	11
Career total			403	37	21	4	33	3	1	0	458	44

=== International appearances ===
Scotland national team
Year	Apps	Goals
2004	6	1
2005	5	0
2006	3	0
Total	14	1

=== International goals ===
Scores and results list Scotland's goal tally first.

#	Date	Venue	Opponent	Score	Result	Competition	Ref
1	30 May 2004	Edinburgh, Scotland	Trinidad and Tobago	4–0	4–1	Friendly	

== Honours ==
Portsmouth

- Football League First Division: 2002–03

== See also ==
- List of Scotland international footballers born outside Scotland
- List of sportspeople who competed for more than one nation
