= Vincent Péricard =

French former professional footballer (born 1982)

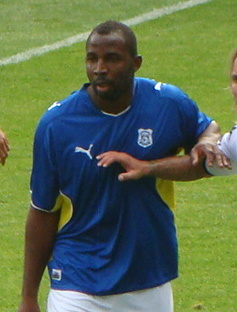
- Péricard pictured whilst playing on trial at Cardiff City in August 2009

Personal information
- Full name: Vincent de Paul Péricard
- Date of birth: 3 October 1982 (age 44)
- Place of birth: Efok, Cameroon
- Height: 1.85 m (6 ft 1 in)
- Position: Striker

Youth career
- 1988–1999: Saint-Étienne

Senior career*
Years	Team	Apps	(Gls)
1999–2000	Saint-Étienne	2	(0)
2000–2002	Juventus	0	(0)
2002–2003	→ Portsmouth (loan)	32	(9)
2003–2006	Portsmouth	12	(0)
2005	→ Sheffield United (loan)	11	(2)
2006	→ Plymouth Argyle (loan)	15	(4)
2006–2009	Stoke City	38	(2)
2008	→ Southampton (loan)	5	(0)
2009	→ Millwall (loan)	2	(0)
2009–2010	Carlisle United	10	(4)
2010–2011	Swindon Town	32	(2)
2011–2012	Havant & Waterlooville	5	(0)
2015	Moneyfields	1	(0)
Total		165	(23)

International career
- France U21
- * Club domestic league appearances and goals

Vincent de Paul Péricard (born 3 October 1982) is a former professional footballer who played as a forward in France with Saint-Étienne and in Italy with Juventus before moving to England, where he played for several clubs. Born in Cameroon, he played for the France U21 team.

== Early life ==
Péricard was born in Efok, Cameroon, but moved to France aged 4. He holds citizenship of both countries.

== Club career ==
=== Saint-Étienne and Juventus ===
Péricard started his career at Saint-Étienne in France at the age of six. In 1999, he advanced to the first team and played two league matches.

He soon came to the attention of Italian Serie A club Juventus, who signed him in 2000. Promised by the media to have a bright future, Julien Courbet made a documentary on Péricard entitled The Man Who Will be Worth Billions. Péricard made only one appearance for the club in two seasons, as a 61st-minute substitute for Tomás Guzmán in a UEFA Champions League match against Arsenal on 20 March 2002.

=== Portsmouth ===
Despite only making one appearance for Juventus, he attracted the attention of Portsmouth manager Harry Redknapp.

Péricard initially moved to Portsmouth on loan for the 2002–03 season. Péricard began his Portsmouth career in superb fashion, scoring on his debut in a 2–0 win over Nottingham Forest, although he struggled with injury in the latter half of the season. Despite this, he impressed enough to earn a permanent switch in July 2003, having scored nine times in 32 games as they won the First Division title.

Péricard was a regular in the squad at the start of the 2003–04 season, but broke down with a torn thigh muscle in late September. He returned to the first team in December, but then badly damaged a cruciate ligament in a reserve comeback game. The injury ended his season. He had an operation on the injury in France in the summer of 2004, and spent the whole of the 2004–05 season in rehabilitation following the surgery. In August 2005, following his recovery, he attended a Cameroon national team training camp for a friendly match against French amateur team Villemomble.

In 2005–06, Péricard returned to the first-team squad at Fratton Park. In order to gain match fitness, he spent a three-month loan spell with Sheffield United, scoring twice against Millwall and Luton, before joining Plymouth Argyle in a loan deal in February 2006 for the remainder of the season. He scored his first English League hat-trick for Plymouth Argyle in a 3–1 win over Coventry City on 18 February 2006. He was recalled to Portsmouth in May 2006.

=== Stoke City ===
Péricard was released by Portsmouth at the end of the 2005–06 season, signing a three-year contract with Stoke City on a free transfer on 19 June 2006. Péricard was Tony Pulis' first signing as manager of Stoke City, in Pulis' second spell at the club. At first, Péricard impressed at Stoke, scoring against eventual promotion winners Derby County on his home début. He also scored in the League Cup against Darlington, and again in the league against Sunderland. However, his performances later in the season were relatively poor and his place was taken by another former Portsmouth player, Ricardo Fuller.

On 24 August 2007, Péricard was sentenced to four months in prison after being found guilty of perverting the course of justice. This came after he lied about being the driver of a car caught speeding at 103 mph near Plymouth. He was released from prison on 20 September 2007; but, following problems with his electronic tag, he was rearrested on 12 October 2007, although he was subsequently re-released later that month. On 14 March 2008, Southampton confirmed the loan signing of Péricard until the end of the season. Upon his return to Stoke, he scored against Reading in a League Cup tie in September 2008.

Péricard made his first Premier League appearance in 0–0 draw with Fulham on 13 December 2008, coming on as a substitute for Danny Pugh. His first start in the Premier League came against Blackburn Rovers. Péricard, after seeing his first team opportunities disappear at Stoke following their promotion to the Premier League, signed a 93-day loan on 20 February 2009 with Millwall. Following the 2008–09 season, Péricard was released from his contract at Stoke.

=== Carlisle United ===
Following his release, he had short trials with Championship sides Bristol City, Cardiff City and Blackpool. On 13 October 2009, Péricard signed for Carlisle United on a contract until January 2010, making his debut on 17 October against Yeovil Town. Pericard scored his first goal for the Cumbrians on his home debut against Southend United. On 24 November 2009, Péricard scored twice in a 4–3 thrilling goal against MK Dons.

The next game on 28 November 2009 against Norwich City, Péricard scored the first goal in the match in a 3–1 win. On 12 December 2009, Péricard scored the only goal in the game in a 1–0 win over Wycombe Wanderers and before the match, Péricard required an injection in his Achilles tendon before scoring the winner. His goalscoring performance and helping the club turn from relegation candidates to play-off contenders led manager Greg Abbott keen to extend Péricard's stay until the end of the season, with a number of clubs interested in giving him a chance to play at a higher level once again. In response, Péricard was happy to sign a contract extension at Carlisle, which ended on 12 January. However, Péricard rejected a new contract at Carlisle and left the club.

=== Swindon Town ===
On 14 January 2010, Swindon Town signed Péricard on a free transfer until June 2011, after the forward had rejected a new deal from Carlisle United; Péricard decided to try his luck elsewhere. He made his debut two days later in a 3–1 win over Gillingham, coming on in the 68th minute for Charlie Austin. He made a forceful run into the penalty area and was bundled to the floor and gaining a penalty, which Billy Paynter scored.

Péricard scored his first goal for Swindon in the Football League Trophy match against Southampton on 31 August 2010, hitting a 30th minute volley into the back of the net, followed by his second goal in injury time to make it 3–0; he also received a booking. On 18 September 2010, Péricard scored the first goal for Swindon which turned out to be a winning goal in a 2–1 win over Walsall. Scoring three goals in the last four games, Péricard believed he that his performances had started to silence his critics. He told the Swindon Advertiser: "I thought the fans were quite harsh to me but Saturday was the first time they have really appreciated what I have done and hopefully now they are going to be behind me and give me even more belief and confidence to play better, I think everyone can see I'm growing in confidence and hopefully some people are starting to see that they were wrong about me". On 11 October 2010, Péricard scored the first goal for Swindon which, again, turned out to be a winning goal in a 2–1 win over Bristol Rovers. On 6 November 2010, Péricard scored his last professional career goal in a 4–0 win over Plymouth Argyle in the First Round of the FA Cup. On 15 January 2011, Péricard made his last professional appearance for Swindon in a 1–0 loss against Yeovil Town, before being sidelined with a knee injury for the next four weeks; upon his recovery, Péricard played his part in Swindon's survival scrap, as he neared his return to fitness. However, Péricard hadn't featured for the rest of the season.

Following Swindon Town's relegation to League Two, Péricard (along with Jakub Jesionkowski) were both released by the club on a free transfer, as their contracts expired on 30 June 2011.

=== Non-League ===
After his release from Swindon, Péricard trained with AFC Bournemouth in a bid to revive his career, but he could not earn a contract. He then signed for Conference South side Havant & Waterlooville, but retired from football in February 2012. In January 2015, he came out of retirement to play for Wessex League club Moneyfields, making his debut on 27 January in a 1–0 win over Folland Sports, which put Moneyfields top of the league.

== Personal life ==
Péricard set up his own company, Elite Welfare Management, which aims to help "foreign players adapt to their new climate and prevent them from suffering stress, loneliness and depression". He is also involved with Kick It Out. As of 2015, he was pursuing business studies at Portsmouth University.

== International career ==
Péricard represented the French U21 side at international level.

== Career statistics ==
Appearances and goals by club, season and competition
Club	Season	League			National cup		League cup		Other		Total	
Club	Season	Division	Apps	Goals	Apps	Goals	Apps	Goals	Apps	Goals	Apps	Goals
Saint-Étienne	1999–2000	French Division 1	2	0	0	0	0	0	—		2	0
Juventus	2000–01	Serie A	0	0	0	0	—		0	0	0	0
Juventus	2001–02	Serie A	0	0	1	0	—		1 (Note: Appearance(s) in UEFA Champions League)	0	2	0
Juventus	Total		0	0	1	0	—		1	0	2	0
Portsmouth (loan)	2002–03	First Division	32	9	1	0	2	1	—		35	10
Portsmouth	2003–04	Premier League	6	0	0	0	1	0	—		7	0
Portsmouth	2004–05	Premier League	0	0	0	0	0	0	—		0	0
Portsmouth	2005–06	Premier League	6	0	1	0	0	0	—		7	0
Portsmouth	Total		44	9	2	0	3	1	—		49	10
Sheffield United (loan)	2005–06	Championship	11	2	0	0	0	0	—		11	2
Plymouth Argyle (loan)	2005–06	Championship	15	4	0	0	0	0	—		15	4
Stoke City	2006–07	Championship	29	2	1	0	1	1	—		31	3
Stoke City	2007–08	Championship	5	0	1	0	0	0	—		6	0
Stoke City	2008–09	Premier League	4	0	1	0	3	1	—		8	1
Stoke City	Total		38	2	3	0	4	2	—		45	4
Southampton (loan)	2007–08	Championship	5	0	0	0	0	0	—		5	0
Millwall (loan)	2008–09	League One	2	0	0	0	0	0	0	0	2	0
Carlisle United	2009–10	League One	10	4	4	2	0	0	2 (Note: Appearance(s) in Football League Trophy)	0	16	6
Swindon Town	2009–10	League One	14	0	0	0	0	0	2 (Note: Appearance(s) in League One play-offs)	0	16	0
Swindon Town	2010–11	League One	18	2	3	1	0	0	3	3	23	6
Swindon Town	Total		32	2	3	1	0	0	5	3	40	6
Havant & Waterlooville	2011–12	Conference South	5	0	0	0	—		0	0	5	0
Moneyfields	2014–15	Wessex League Premier Division	1	0	0	0	—		0	0	1	0
Career total			165	23	13	3	7	3	8	3	193	32

== Honours ==
Portsmouth

- Football League First Division: 2002–03
