= Anglican Diocese of Idah =

Diocese in the Church of Nigeria

Coordinates: 7°05′N 6°45′E

The Anglican Diocese of Idah is one of 11 dioceses within the Anglican Province of Lokoja, one of the 14 ecclesiastical provinces within the Church of Nigeria. The current bishop is the Right Rev. Joseph Musa. The Rt Revd Joseph Musa was consecrated on 13 March, 2005 as the new Bishop of Idah. Idah dioceses are among the 17 dioceses of the Abuja Province, which was created on 14 March 2005.

The diocesan Bishop's Lodge is situated in Idah, Kogi State, Nigeria.
