= Jacob Kwashi =

Anglican bishop in Nigeria

Jacob Kwashi is an Anglican bishop in Nigeria: he is the current Bishop of Zonkwa, one of 13 dioceses within the Anglican Province of Abuja, itself one of 14 provinces within the Church of Nigeria.

Kwashi became Bishop of Zonkwa in September 2011, having previously been Dean of St Michael's Cathedral in Kaduna. His older brother, Benjamin Kwashi is the Archbishop of the Province of Jos.
