= Anglican Diocese of Makurdi =

Anglican diocese in Nigeria

Coordinates: 7°20′N 8°45′E

Diocese of Makurdi

Location
- Ecclesiastical province: Church of Nigeria

Statistics
- Parishes: 25

Information
- Rite: Anglican

Current leadership
- Bishop: Nathan Inyom

The Diocese of Makurdi is a diocese of the Anglican Church of Nigeria, in the Abuja Province, that is roughly contiguous with Benue State. It is divided in 25 parishes and 4 archdeaconries, Gboko, Katsina-Ala, Makurdi and Zaki-Biam.

== History ==
The diocese was founded as one of the eight missionary dioceses created in Northern Nigeria at the start of the Decade of Evangelism. Makurdi was the centre of the southern archdeaconry of the Diocese of Jos and is the capital of Benue State.

The diocese was founded on 24 September 1990 with the enthronement of Nathan Nyitar Inyom (the then-archdeacon) as the first Bishop of Makurdi. The staff of the diocese were five other clergy and evangelists and congregations in thirty-one churches. The diocese saw dramatic growth through the decade and at the end of 2000 had grown to over two hundred churches, while the number of the workers have increased to fifty clergy and ten lay workers.

Mission and evangelism continue to be the stated priorities of the diocese, but unrest in the period following the return to democracy in 1999 has led to the church responding with more work in conflict resolution and reconciliation.

== List of bishops ==
- J. T. Iyangemar (first bishop, consecrated 29 April 1990, Kaduna)
- Nathan Inyom, 1990–present
