= Duke Akamisoko =

Nigerian Anglican bishop

Duke Timothy Akamisoko is a Nigerian Anglican bishop. He is bishop of the Kubwa diocese, in the Abuja province of the Church of Nigeria, a denomination of the worldwide Anglican Communion.

== Education and training ==
- Gari primary school, Kaduna
- Teachers' College, Dutsin-a, Katsina
- Federal College of Education, Katsina
- Bishop Crowther College of Theology, Okene
- University of Nsukka
- Theological College of Northern Nigeria
- Bukuru/University of Jos

== Career history ==
- ordained deacon June 1991; ordained priest December 1991
- canon 1997
- archdeacon 2000
- bishop 2005
- teacher/chaplain at Crowther Memorial College Lokoja 1989-1996
- vicar of St Barnabas church, Ecewu, Kogi State 1991-1992
- vicar of Memorial church Lokoja 1992-1997
- canon residentiary at St Luke's cathedral, Birin, Kebbe State 1997-2001
- archdeacon at St Luke's cathedral, Birin, Kebbe State 2001-2002
- director of ecumenism and inter-faith dialogue in the Primate's office at the Abuja province
- named in January 2005 as bishop of the missionary diocese of Zonkwa in the Abuja province; consecrated 19 March 2005
- translated from Zonkwa diocese to Kubwa diocese in 2009, as successor to Bishop Simon Bala who died in November 2008.

== "Church and society" comments ==
Bishop Duke has decried the poor state of the education system in Nigeria.

He has spoken out against terrorism and corruption, urging the Federal Government of Nigeria to adopt methods used by other nations use to counter terrorism, saying "Every step should be taken by the government at all levels, federal, state and the local governments to avert this ugly and embarrassing situation; another serious matter is corruption that infiltrated all levels and areas of government including the civil service".

The bishop advocates a tougher stance on crime, stating "in Nigeria, people steal money and they are not punished". He has advocated capital punishment for offenders found guilty of murder.

== Personal life ==
Bishop Duke married his wife Sarah in 1996 and in 2013 they had twins: a boy and a girl.

== Published works ==
Samuel Ajayi Crowther: His Missionary Work in the Lokoja Area January 2002.

Bishop Duke has also published academic studies on the dual nature of Jesus Christ and (essays) on the 39 Articles of the Church of England.
