= Nigeria v. Process & Industrial Developments Ltd. =

Legal dispute between Nigeria and P&ID over gas processing contract

Nigeria v. Process & Industrial Developments Ltd (P&ID) is an international legal dispute between the Federal Republic of Nigeria and a British Virgin Islands-based company, P&ID. The case centres around a 2010 Gas Supply and Processing Agreement (GSPA), which led to an arbitration award of over US$11 billion against Nigeria. The award was later set aside by a UK court in 2023 after findings of fraud and corruption.

== Background ==
In January 2010, Nigeria signed a 20-year gas supply and processing agreement with Process and Industrial Development (P&ID). The contract required Nigeria to supply wet gas to P&ID, which would then construct and operate a processing plant in Calabar, Cross River State. In return, the processed gas (lean gas) would be returned to Nigeria for power generation.

However, the agreement failed to materialise as neither party fulfilled its obligations. Nigeria did not supply the gas, and P&ID never built the plant. In 2012, P&ID initiated arbitration proceedings in London, claiming breach of contract by Nigeria.

== Arbitration and Award ==
In 2015, the arbitration tribunal ruled that Nigeria was liable for breach of contract. By January 2017, the tribunal awarded P&ID damages of US$6.6 billion plus interest. By 2019, the total amount, including accrued interest, had risen to approximately US$11 billion.

P&ID sought enforcement of the award in the High Court of Justice in London, a move that Nigeria contested

== Legal Challenge and UK Court Ruling ==
Nigeria challenged the enforcement on the grounds of fraud, alleging that P&ID obtained the contract and the arbitration award through corrupt practices, including bribery of Nigerian officials and misuse of privileged documents.

In October 2023, the High Court in London set aside the award, ruling in Nigeria’s favour. Justice Robin Knowles concluded that P&ID had engaged in fraudulent conduct and that enforcing the award would be contrary to public policy.

== Legal Findings ==
The court found that:

- P&ID presented false evidence to the arbitration tribunal.
- A Nigerian government lawyer was bribed during the arbitration process.
- P&ID improperly obtained and retained confidential legal documents belonging to Nigeria.

These findings rendered the original award unenforceable under English law.

== Impact and Significance ==
The ruling was widely regarded as a significant victory for Nigeria, potentially saving the country from paying a sum equivalent to nearly a third of its annual budget. The case also raised broader questions about transparency and accountability in international arbitration involving state contracts.

It has been cited as a key example of how corruption can distort investor-state dispute resolution, sparking renewed calls for reform in arbitration procedures and due diligence standards.

== See also ==
- Arbitration
- Investor-state dispute settlement
- Corruption in Nigeria
- Economic and Financial Crimes Commission (Nigeria)
