= Corruption in Nigeria =

Corruption in Nigeria is a severe and long-standing issue. In 2012, Nigeria was estimated to have lost over $400 billion to corruption since its independence. Corruption is an anti-social attitude awarding improper privileges contrary to legal and moral norms and impairs the authorities' capacity to secure the welfare of all citizens.

Nigerian politicians find themselves in a strong position of power and wealth due to their connections with the oil and gas industries in Nigeria. The sector is under the control of the state-owned company NNPC Limited. Oil and gas exports account for over 90% of all Nigerian export revenues. While many politicians own or have shares in these industries, tax revenues from the energy sector are diminished and the benefits of Nigeria's energy wealth are not evenly distributed throughout the country with Lagos State benefitting disproportionately. Oil and gas revenues, therefore, account for the vast majority of the federal budget and the salaries of government officials. Vote rigging by political parties in elections is widespread, and corruption is endemic within government. Business arrangements and family loyalties dominate governmental appointments, paving the way for politicians, officials, and their business associates, who together make up the ruling elite, to ensure that they all become wealthy through behind-the-scenes agreements and the awarding of profitable contracts to favored supporters. In 2018, many government employees received annual salaries over $1 million. Corruption runs through every level of the Nigerian government. From considerable contract fraud at the top, through petty bribery, money laundering schemes, embezzlement, and diverting salaries through ghost workers, it is estimated that corruption within the state apparatus costs the country billions of dollars annually.

== History and cases ==
The rise of public administration and the discovery of oil and natural gas are two major events believed to have led to the sustained increase in the incidence of corrupt practices in the country.

The government has made efforts to minimize corruption through the enactment of laws and the enforcement of integrity systems, but with little success.

Greed, ostentatious lifestyle, customs, and people's attitudes are believed to have led to corruption. Another root cause is tribalism. Friends and kinsmen seeking favor from officials can impose strains on the ethical disposition of the official as these kinsmen see government officials as holding avenues for their survival and gain.

=== Pre-Independence and the First Republic ===
Corruption, though prevalent, was kept at manageable levels during the First Republic. However, the cases of corruption during the period were sometimes clouded by political infighting.

- Azikiwe was the first major political figure investigated for questionable practices. In 1944, a firm belonging to Azikiwe and his family bought a bank in Lagos. The bank was procured to strengthen local control of the financial industry.
- However, a report on transactions conducted by the bank showed that, although Azikiwe had resigned as chairman of the bank, the current chairman was acting on his behalf. The report wrote that most of the paid-up capital of the African Continental Bank was from the Eastern Regional Financial Corporation.
- In western Nigeria, politician Adegoke Adelabu was investigated following charges of political corruption leveled against him by the opposition.
- In the Northern region, against the backdrop of corruption allegations leveled against some native authority officials in Borno. The Northern Government enacted the Customary Presents order to forestall any further breach of regulations. Later on, the British administration was accused of corrupt practices in the results of elections which enthroned a Fulani political leadership in Kano, when reports linking the British authorities to electoral irregularities were discovered.

=== Gowon administration (August 1966 – July 1975) ===
Corruption, for most of Yakubu Gowon's administration, was kept away from public view until 1975. However, informed officials voiced their concerns. Critics said Gowon's governors acted like lords overseeing their personal fiefdom. He was viewed as timid and faced with corrupt elements in his government.

In 1975, corruption was a scandal surrounding the importation of cement that engulfed many officials of the defense ministry and the Central Bank of Nigeria. Officials were later accused of falsifying ship manifestos and inflating the amount of cement to be purchased.

During the Gowon administration, two individuals from the middle belt of the country were accused of corruption. The Nigerian government controlled the newspapers, so the Daily Times and the New Nigerian gave great publicity to denunciations of the administration of Gomwalk and Federal Commissioner Joseph Tarka by the two critics — a situation that may signal a cause for exigent action on corruption.

=== Murtala administration (1975 – February 1976) ===
In 1975, the administration of Murtala Mohammed made reformist changes. After a military coup brought it to power, the new government sacked a large number of prior government officials and civil servants, many of whom had been criticized for the misuse of power they wielded under the largely uneducated military of Gowon.

=== Obasanjo administration (February 1976 – September 1979) ===
The first administration of Olusegun Obasanjo was a continuation of the Murtala Mohammed administration and was focused on completing the transition program to democracy, as well as implementing the national development plans. Major projects including building new refineries, pipelines, expanding the national shipping and airlines as well as hosting FESTAC were done during this administration. Several of these national projects were conduits to distribute favors and enrich connected politicians. The famous Afrobeat musician, Fela Kuti, sang about various major scandals involving the international telecommunication firm ITT led by Chief MKO Abiola in Nigeria, which the then head of state, Gen Olusegun Obasanjo, was associated with. In addition to this, the Operation Feed the Nation Program, and the associated land grab under the Land Use Decree implemented by the then head of state were used as conduits to reward cronies, and his now-famous Otta Farm Nigeria (OFN) was supposedly a project borne out of this scandal.

=== Shagari administration (October 1979 – December 1983) ===
Corruption was deemed pervasive during the administration of Shehu Shagari. A few federal buildings mysteriously caught fire after investigators started to probe the finances of the officials working in the buildings. In late 1985, investigations into the collapse of the defunct Johnson Mathey Bank of London shed light on some of the abuses carried out during the Second Republic. The bank acted as a conduit to transfer hard currency for some party members in Nigeria. A few leading officials and politicians had amassed large amounts of money. They sought to transfer the money out of the country with the help of Asian importers by issuing import licenses.

In 1981, a rice shortage led to accusations of corruption against the NPN government. Shortages and subsequent allegations were precipitated by protectionism. After its election, the Nigerian government decided to protect local rice farmers from imported commodities. A licensing system was created to limit rice imports. However, accusations of favoritism and government-supported speculation were leveled against many officials.

=== Buhari administration (December 1983 – August 1985) ===
In 1985, a cross-section of politicians was convicted of corrupt practices under the government of General Muhammadu Buhari, but the administration itself was only involved in a few instances of lapsed ethical judgment. Some cite the suitcases scandal, which coincidentally involved then-customs leader Atiku Abubakar, who later became vice president in 1999 and was indicted for various acts of corruption. "The 53 suitcases saga arose in 1984 during the currency change exercise ordered by the Buhari junta when it ordered that every case arriving in the country should be inspected irrespective of the status of the person behind such. The 53 suitcases were, however, ferried through the Murtala Muhammed Airport without a customs check by soldiers allegedly at the behest of Major Mustapha Jokolo, the then aide-de-camp to Gen. Buhari. Atiku was at that time the Area Comptroller of Customs in charge of the Murtala Muhammed Airport."

=== Babangida administration (August 1985 – August 1993) ===
The regime of General Ibrahim Babangida, or IBB, has been seen as the body that legalized corruption. His administration refused to give an account of the Gulf War windfall, estimated to be $12.4 billion. He annulled the freest and fairest election in the history of Nigeria on June 12, 1993. He lives in a very luxurious mansion in his home state of Niger.

During General Babangida's tenure, corruption became a state policy. He routinely disbursed vehicles and cash gifts to people to earn loyalty, and the discipline of the military force eroded. The term "IBB Boys" emerged, meaning fronts for the head of state in the business realm, someone who will transact dirty deals from drug dealing to money laundering.

General Ibrahim Babangida used various government privatization initiatives to reward friends and cronies, which eventually gave rise to the current class of nouveau riche in Nigeria. From banking to oil and import licenses, IBB used these favors to raise cash for himself and his family and is regarded as one of the richest ex-rulers of Nigeria supposedly with significant investment in Globacom—one of the largest telecom operators in Nigeria, regarded as a front for his empire.

=== Abacha administration (Nov 1993 – June 1998) ===
The death of general Sani Abacha revealed the global nature of graft. French investigations of bribes paid to government officials to ease the award of a gas plant construction in Nigeria revealed the level of official graft in the country. The investigations led to the freezing of accounts containing about $100 million United States dollars.

In 2000, two years after his death, a Swiss Banking Commission report indicted Swiss banks for failing to follow the compliance process when they allowed Abacha's family and friends access to his accounts and to deposit amounts totaling $600 million US dollars into them. The same year, a total of more than $1 billion US dollars was found in various accounts throughout Europe.

=== Abdusalami administration (June 1998 – May 1999) ===
The government of Gen. Abdusalami was short and focused on transiting the country quickly to democracy. Albeit, the suspicion remains that quite a huge amount of wealth was acquired by him and his inner circle in such a short period, as he lives in quite an exquisite mansion of his own adjacent IBB's that exceeds whatever he might have earned in legitimate income. Indeed, the major Halliburton scandal implicated his administration, and this might have financed his opulence.

=== Obasanjo administration (May 1999 – May 2007) ===
Various corruption scandals broke out under Olusegun Obasanjo's presidency, including one of the international dimensions when his vice president was caught in cahoots with a US Congressman stashing cold hard cash (literally) in freezers. In addition to this, the KBR and Siemens bribery scandals broke out under his administration, which were investigated by the FBI and led to international indictments indicating high-level corruption in his administration. According to reports, "while Nigeria dithered, the United States Department of Justice on January 18, 2012, announced that a Japanese construction firm, Marubeni Corporation, agreed to pay a $54.6 million criminal penalty for allegedly bribing officials of the Nigerian government to facilitate the award of the $6 billion liquefied natural gas contract in Bonny, Nigeria to a multinational consortium, TSKJ". They paid bribes to Nigerian government officials between 1995 and 2004, in violation of the. Obasanjo also had to sack his labour minister Hussaini Akwanga on allegations that he took bribes to approve a major government contract with a French electronics group. Obasanjo also sacked and handed over the Inspector General of Police Mr Tafa Balogun to the EFCC on grounds of corruption to the tune of 5.7 billion. Obasanjo was able to extend his anti-corruption watchdog by arresting some of his ministers that were caught in bribery and corruption scandals.

Some other acts of corruption tied to Olusegun Obasanjo included the Transcorp shares scandal that violated the code of conduct standards for public officers, and the presidential library donations on the eve of his exit from the power that pressured associates to donate. Obasanjo was also said to widely lobby for his failed campaign to alter the constitution to get a third term by actively bribing the legislators. further deepening corruption at the highest levels.

Overall, energy development of non-renewables was “front and centre on the country's agenda during its 33 years of military rule, especially through restructuring and creating new energy enterprises and companies"(Osunmuyiwa 145). When Obasanjo took office in 1999, his government acquired not only a delicate state but an unsustainable economy heavily dependent on oil and imbalanced international trade deals. Additionally, the energy crisis, which was inherited, continued due to the limited energy sector, overall governmental inefficiency, and corruption.

=== Umaru Musa Yar'Adua administration (May 2007 – May 2010) ===
Yaradua's ascent and time in office were short, although a fair number of corruption scandals from previous administrations came to light under his tenure and went uninvestigated due to lack of political will and poor health. Yaradua's various acts of political corruption using his attorney-general to frustrate ongoing local and international investigations of his powerful friends like Governors James Ibori, Lucky Igbinnedion, and Peter Odili which led to huge losses to their states. Attorney General of the Federation, Michael Aondakaa was unable to obtain a conviction in Nigeria even as the UK and foreign courts successfully tried Nigeria's deeply corrupt governors from the Obasanjo era that helped Yaradua emerge as president. In addition, leaked diplomatic cables revealed that the Supreme Court Justices were bribed to legitimize the corrupt elections that led to his emergence as president through widespread rigging.

=== Goodluck Jonathan administration (2010–2015) ===
Nigeria's corruption rating by TI improved from 143rd to the 136th position in 2014. In late 2013, Nigeria's then Central Bank governor Sanusi Lamido Sanusi informed President Goodluck Jonathan that the state oil company, NNPC, had failed to remit US$20 billion in oil revenues owed to the state. Jonathan, however, dismissed the claim and replaced Sanusi for his mismanagement of the central bank's budget. A Senate committee also found Sanusi's account to be lacking in substance. After the conclusion of the NNPC's account audit, it was announced in January 2015 that NNPC's non-remitted revenue is actually US$1.48 billion, which it needs to refund to the government. Upon the release of both the PwC and Deloitte report by the government on the eve of its exit, it was however determined that truly close to $20 billion was indeed missing or misappropriated or spent without appropriation.

In addition to these, the government of Goodluck Jonathan had several running scandals including the BMW purchase by his Aviation Minister, to the tune of 255 million naira and security contracts to militants in the Niger Delta, extensive corruption and kickbacks in the Ministry of Petroleum, the Malabu Oil International scandal, and several scandals involving the Petroleum Ministry. In the dying days of Goodluck Jonathan's administration, the Central Bank scandal of cash tripping of mutilated notes also broke out, where it was revealed that in a four-day period, 8 billion naira was stolen directly by low-level workers in the CBN. This revelation excluded a crime that is suspected to have gone on for years and went undetected until revealed by a whistle-blower. The Central Bank claims the heist undermined its monetary policy. In 2014, UNODC began an initiative to help combat corruption in Nigeria.

New allegations of corruption have begun to emerge since the departure of President Jonathan on May 29, 2015, including:

1. $2.2 billion was illegally withdrawn from Excess Crude Oil Accounts, of which $1 billion was supposedly approved by President Jonathan to fund his reelection campaign without the knowledge of the National Economic Council made up of state governors and the president and vice president.
2. NEITI discovered $11.6 billion was missing from Nigeria LNG Company dividend payments.
3. 60 million barrels of oil valued at $13.7 billion was stolen under the watch of the national oil company, Nigerian National Petroleum Corporation, from 2009 to 2012.
4. NEITI indicates losses due to crude swaps due to subsidy and domestic crude allocation from 2005 to 2012 indicated that $11.63 billion had been paid to the NNPC but that “there is no evidence of the money being remitted to the federation account”.
5. Diversion of 60% of $1 billion foreign loans obtained from the Chinese by the Ministry of Finance
6. Enormous scams in weapons and defence procurements, and misuse of the 3 trillion naira defence budget since 2011 under the guise of fighting Boko Haram
7. Diversion of $2.2 million vaccination medicine fund, by the Ministry of Health
8. Diversion of Ebola fight fund up to 1.9 bn naira
9. NIMASA fraud under investigation by EFCC, inclusive of accusation of funding PDP and buying a small piece of land for 13 billion naira
10. Ministry of Finance led by Okonjo Iweala hurried payment of $2.2 million to health ministry contractor in disputed invoices
11. NDDC scams and multifarious scams including 2.7 billion naira worth of contracts that do not conform to the Public Procurement Act
12. The Police Service Commission Scam investigated by ICPC revealed the misappropriation of over 150 million nairas related to election-related training. ICPC made refund recommendations, but many analysts indicated prosecution was more appropriate.

=== Muhammadu Buhari administration (2015–2023) ===
The presidency of Muhammadu Buhari saw major action against corruption in Nigeria. In 2016, the Senate ad hoc committee on the "mounting humanitarian crisis in the North East" led by Senator Shehu Sani indicted the then secretary to the Government of the Federation appointed by Muhammadu Buhari, Mr. Babachir Lawal in an N200 million contract scandal for the clearing of "invasive plant species" in Yobe State by Rholavision Nigeria Limited, a company he owns.

On October 30, 2017, President Buhari sacked Lawal based on the report of a three-man panel led by Vice-President Yemi Osinbajo that investigated him and one other.

In 2016, Buhari was reportedly presented with evidence that his chief of staff, Abba Kyari, took a N500 million bribe from MTN to help it slash the $5 billion dollar fine slammed against it for violation of Nigeria telecommunications regulations bothering on national security. MTN fired the staff involved in the bribery scandal. But Abba Kyari was left intact in his position as chief of staff to national outrage forcing Buhari to announce the probe of Kyari. The findings of the investigation were never made public.

Abdulrasheed Maina was the head of the task force on pension reforms during the President Goodluck Jonathan-led administration but fled Nigeria in 2015 after claims that he embezzled two billion naira ($5.6 million, 4.8 million euros). Despite the fact that an Interpol arrest warrant was issued, he still managed to return to Nigeria, where he was said to have enjoyed protection from the Buhari government. Maina had been fired from his position by Goodluck Jonathan's administration and was put under investigation for corrupt practices but was reinstated and given a double promotion by the Buhari administration. Maina was convicted after he was found guilty of money laundering.

According to the Senate through its committee on public accounts, 85 government parastatals under the present government under the leadership of Muhammadu Buhari have yet to submit their audit reports since the inception of this government.

The flag bearer of the corruption fight in Nigeria, the Economic and Financial Crimes Commission (EFCC) responded to the senate committee on public account's claim on the nonsubmission of her account report by the institution and 84 others. The EFCC denied the report issued by the committee claiming it was not true.

Despite criticism, the EFCC announced in May 2018, that 603 Nigerian figures had been convicted on corruption charges since Buhari took office in 2015. The EFCC also announced that for the first time in Nigeria's history, judges and top military officers including retired service chiefs were being prosecuted for corruption. In December 2019, the country's controversial ex-Attorney General Mohammed Adoke, who was accused of being bribed to grant oil licenses to Shell, was extradited back to Nigeria from Dubai and was immediately arrested. In January 2020, however, Transparency International's Corruption Perceptions Index still gave Nigeria a low ranking of 146 out of 180 countries surveyed.

In 2018, some politicians who worked hard for the reelection of President Mohammed Buhari had corruption cases hanging on their necks. One of them is Abdullahi Adamu, who was the Governor of Nasarawa State (1999 - 2007), and is now the Chairman of the political party of the President - All Progressive Congress (APC). He was also a member of the National Advisory Committee for the Buhari 2019 Presidential Support Committee. He was charged with allegedly stealing N15bn from Nasarawa State when he was the governor. Peoples' Democratic Party, the opposition party raised the issue of the corruption charge when Abdullahi Adamu was set to become the Chairman of APC. However, the Presidency replied and said he had 'repented'.

By October 2020, however, End SARS protestors alleged that Nigerian police officers, despite being employed by what has long been perceived as being the most corrupt institution in Nigeria, were no longer paid adequately and, despite calling out police brutality, called for an increase in police salaries as one of their five demands.

In May 2022, the Accountant General of Nigeria, Ahmed Idris was arrested for money laundering and diversion of public funds. His tenure was extended by President Mohammed Buhari in 2019 despite the fact that he had clocked 60yrs which is the mandatory age for retirement. The Accountant General is said to have committed fraud by corruptly manipulating the Treasury Single Account (TSA), Government Integrated Financial Management Information System (GIFMIS) and Integrated Payroll and Personnel Information System (IPPIS) to steal billions of Naira. An official of a government agency, Revenue Mobilization, Allocation and Fiscal Commission was named as one of the parties to the corruption case.

The government of President Mohammed Buhari has been perceived as one that failed to curb corrupt practices in government.

== Public institutions perceived as corrupt ==
The following list contains the institutions perceived as the most corrupt. It is culled from the Nigeria Survey and Corruption Survey Study, Final Report (June 2003) Institute for Development Research, Ahmadu Bello University, Zaria (IDR, ABU Zaria)

Nigeria (as of 2003)
Rating	Institution
1	Nigerian Police
2	Political Parties
3	National and State Assemblies
4	Local and Municipal Governments
5	Federal and State Executive Councils
6	Traffic Police and Federal Road Safety Corps
7	NEPA

In February 2019, it was reported that Nigerian Police Force officers commonly gained extra money by extorting local residents the sum of 50 Nigerian naira. On July 30, 2019, three Nigeria Police Force Officers from Anambra State were arrested on charges of extorting three residents. On March 9, 2020, two Nigeria Police Force officers from Lagos, Assistant Superintendent of Police (ASP) Adebayo Ojo and Sergeant Adeleke Mojisola were both arrested on charges of extorting a woman. The next day, another Nigeria Police Force officer from Lagos, Inspector Taloju Martins, was arrested after being caught on camera extorting a motorist.

On Transparency International's 2025 Corruption Perceptions Index, Nigeria scored 26 on a scale from 0 ("highly corrupt") to 100 ("very clean"). When ranked by score, Nigeria ranked 142nd among the 182 countries in the Index, where the country ranked first is perceived to have the most honest public sector. For comparison with regional scores, the best score among sub-Saharan African countries (Note: Angola, Benin, Botswana, Burkina Faso, Burundi, Cameroon, Cape Verde, Central African Republic, Chad, Comoros, Côte d'Ivoire, Democratic Republic of the Congo, Djibouti, Equatorial Guinea, Eritrea, Eswatini, Ethiopia, Gabon, Gambia, Ghana, Guinea, Guinea-Bissau, Kenya, Lesotho, Liberia, Madagascar, Malawi, Mali, Mauritania, Mauritius, Mozambique, Namibia, Niger, Nigeria, Republic of the Congo, Rwanda, Sao Tome and Principe, Senegal, Seychelles, Sierra Leone, Somalia, South Africa, South Sudan, Sudan, Tanzania, Togo, Uganda, Zambia, and Zimbabwe.) was 68, the average was 32 and the worst was 9. For comparison with worldwide scores, the best score was 89 (ranked 1), the average was 42, and the worst was 9 (ranked 181, in a two-way tie).

A 2024 survey conducted by the Chatham House Africa Programme’s Social Norms and Accountable Governance (SNAG) project found that 61 per cent of Nigerian households believe that judges in Nigeria were likely to accept bribes to influence their rulings. The paper also indicated that "74 per cent and 78 per cent of respondents expect officials in charge of state procurement and private contractors to routinely divert money from public contracts for personal use."

== Godfatherism ==
In Nigeria, there is a very big gap between the rich and the poor. Due to this, there is space in politics for richer people to manipulate results and candidates. The BBC did an article in February 2019 detailing how much of an effect 'godfathers' can have on the outcome. For example, it was reported, "They are political sponsors, who use money and influence to win support for their preferred candidates." It is explained that these 'godfathers' groom a candidate that they trust can implement the policies they want".

== See also ==
- Brown envelope journalism, Nigeria
- Innoson Group vs GTBank fraud case
- List of impeached Nigerian state governors

General:

- Crime in Nigeria
- Corruption by country
- International Anti-Corruption Academy
- Group of States Against Corruption
- International Anti-Corruption Day
- ISO 37001 Anti-bribery management systems
- United Nations Convention against Corruption
- OECD Anti-Bribery Convention
- Transparency International

== Bibliography ==
- Ngozi Okonjo-Iweala (2012). Reforming the Unreformable: Lessons from Nigeria. MIT Press. ISBN 9780262018142.
- https://www.bbc.co.uk/news/world-africa-47089372 (accessed 5 January 2020)

== Reading Lists ==
- Albert, Isaac Olawale (2006-06-27). "Explaining 'godfatherism' in Nigerian politics". African Sociological Review. 9 (2): 79–105. doi:10.4314/asr.v9i2.23262. ISSN 1027-4332.
- Temidayo, O. F., & Okoye, V. J. (2020). PSYCHOLOGY OF POLITICS AND POLITICIANS IN NIGERIA: THE HUMAN AND SOCIAL GOVERNANCE CONSEQUENCES. Global Journal of Politics and Law Research, 8(1), 1-13
- Ajayi, Lasisi (June 2015). "Critical Multimodal Literacy". Journal of Literacy Research. 47 (2): 216–244. doi:10.1177/1086296x15618478. ISSN 1086-296X.
- Albert, Isaac Olawale (2005). "Explaining 'godfatherism' in Nigerian Politics". African Sociological Review. 9 (2): 79–105. doi:10.4314/asr.v9i2.23262. ISSN 1027-4332.
- Onwuzuruigbo, Ifeanyi (2013). "Recontextualisation of the Concept of Godfatherism: Reflections on Nigeria". Africa Development. 38 (1–2): 25–50.
