= List of impeached Nigerian state governors =

This is a list of impeached Nigerian state governors since the inception of democracy in 1999.

Nigeria is a country organized into 36 states, and a Federal territory (FCT). Each state is governed by a Governor who is elected for a four-year term through an election process by an independent body known as Independent National Electoral Commission (INEC), while the FCT is administered by a Minister appointed by the president. Under certain terms and conditions, the Governor may be replaced by another, for example through death, impeachment or if an election is annulled.

- Ayo Fayose (Born 15 November 1960) was impeached as the Executive Governor of Ekiti State, Nigeria on 16 October 2006 on alleged mismanagement of public funds and serial killings
- Peter Obi (born 19 July 1961) was impeached as the Executive Governor of Anambra State on 2 November 2006 on alleged gross misconduct
- Joshua Dariye, was impeached as the Executive Governor of Plateau State, Nigeria on 13 November 2006 on alleged siphon of public fund and money laundering in London
- Rashidi Adewolu Ladoja, was impeached as the Executive Governor of Oyo State, Nigeria on 12 January 2006 by 18 Legislators
- Diepreye Alamieyeseigha was impeached as the Executive Governor of Bayelsa State, Nigeria on 9 December 2005 on alleged corruption which includes, theft of public funds, abuse of office, and money laundering.
- Murtala Nyako was impeached as the Executive Governor of Adamawa State, Nigeria in July 2014 on alleged corruption which includes theft of public funds, abuse of office and money laundering

== See also ==
- Corruption in Nigeria

Alhaji Balarabe Musa of Kaduna State was impeached in 1981 by the NPN who had majority in State House of Assembly against his party (PRP) with minority members in the House.
