= Innoson Group vs GTBank fraud case =

Nigerian legal case

The Innoson Group vs GTBank fraud case involves claims where plaintiff Innoson Motors claims that GT Bank owes Innoson Motors a large sum of money that after 22% interest compounded annually over several years totals ₦8.9 billion. However, the Nigerian government is also investigating claims that Innoson Motors is guilty of fraud. Innoson Motors began its case against GT Bank in 2011. Recently, the Nigerian Supreme Court ruled in favor of Innoson Motors claim against GT Bank, and the company says that it is due to take over GT Bank in lieu of receiving its money. The scandal received publicity after the arrest of the Innonson chairman by the Economic and Financial Crimes Commission. Innoson took the dispute to social media, with hashtags such as #BewareOfGTBank and #WhatIsWrongWithGTBank. In a TVC News interview, Innocent Chukwuma said that he had obtained an ₦8 billion judgement against the bank.

In 2009, GTBank extended credit to Innoson; under loan terms agreed to by Chukwuma on behalf of Innoson, proprietary interest in imported goods was exclusively that of the bank. The original shipping documents were in the bank's custody, and ownership could only be transferred to Innoson (or any other third party) by the bank when the conditions of the agreement were fulfilled. Chukwuma approached the bank on behalf of Innoson for the documents, and was refused due to Innoson's failure to meet the agreed conditions; however, the bank noticed in June 2011 that the imported goods had been procured by Innoson without their consent. The bank’s endorsement of the bills of lading to the shipping line had been forged. GTBank reported the forgery to the Nigeria Police Force, who began an investigation. After a forensic examination of the disputed signatures, the police established that the signatures of the bank’s staff were forged and the imported goods were fraudulently cleared from the Nigerian Ports Authority.

According to a 10 November 2017 Innoson Group press release, the company was a GTBank customer. The issue dated back to 2012, when the bank "arbitrarily imposed and debited [their] current account in excessive and unlawful charges". Innoson sued GTBank, and several judgements were appealed by both sides. In 2013/2014, GTBank owed Innoson Motors up to ₦8.5 billion. Innoson's claims on the judgement were debunked in media reports, with journalists covering the story confirming that the company's only judgement against Guaranty Trust Bank was obtained at the Federal High Court in Awka (which controversially awarded Innoson ₦4.7 billion). Its appeal has been pending at the Court of Appeal in Enugu for several years, due to Innoson's efforts to block the hearing.

A 25 December 2017 Innoson press release stated that GTBank had never granted Innoson a ₦2.4 billion 2009 loan, but a ₦500 million loan in an offer letter dated 17 December 2009; their last loan transaction was in 2011. The principal terms and security for the loan were: legal/tripartite legal mortgage over Innoson’s properties, valued at ₦1.1 billion in 2010 by GTB-appointed appraisers; a 25-percent equity contribution by Innoson on each letter-of-credit (LC) transaction, and shipping documents worth ₦500 million could be released at any time to Innoson. On 13 June 2018, Innoson admitted distorting the Supreme Court directive in its case with GTBank and apologised for misleading the public with their false claim of a Supreme Court Order against Guaranty Trust Bank.

== Investigation ==
A Nigeria Police Force investigation following a September 2013 petition by the bank confirmed that Innoson and Chukwuma deliberately set out to defraud, steal from the bank and convert the imported goods belonging to the bank through forgery and misrepresentation, and Chukwuma was charged by the police.

== EFCC ==
Chukwuma was arrested at his home in Enugu on 19 December 2017 and interrogated in Lagos about the alleged scandal. The Economic and Financial Crimes Commission said that Chukwuma was arrested for fraud at the Security and Exchange Commission (SEC) and for forging documents to obtain tax waivers. The company denied the allegations, saying that the EFCC had never investigated Innoson.

== Courts ==
In January 2018, Justice Mojisola Dada ordered the EFCC to subpoena Chukwuma after his attorney attempted to justify his absence at the Lagos State High Court in Ikeja for his scheduled arraignment. According to the EFCC, the businessman was evading arrest.

In June 2018, Judge Mojisola Dada of the Ikeja Special Offences Court ordered the arrest of Chukwuma, who was wanted for failing to appear before the court for arraignment for the fifth time. Chukwuma had previously failed to appear in court on 17 January, 9 February, 14 March and 25 April.

In 2014, a ₦4.7 billion judgment was awarded to Innoson by a judge at the Federal High Court in Awka. Guaranty Trust Bank immediately appealed the judgment, calling it "ridiculous" at the Court of Appeal in Enugu. The Court of Appeal asked the Bank to place the judgment in an interest-bearing escrow account with the court’s registrars. The bank balked, offering the court a guarantee instead and appealing to the Supreme Court.

The bank's appeal was heard at the Supreme Court in Abuja on 7 June 2018. The court sided with GTBank, paving the way for the bank’s appeal of the Akwa High Court judgment at the Court of Appeal in Enugu. That hearing, on 14 June, was adjourned by the court until a date to be determined later.
