= RSB Bello-Fadile =

Nigerian Army Officer

Colonel RSB Bello-Fadile
- Education: Nigerian Defence Academy; Ahmadu Bello University
- Military career
- Service years: 1971 – 1999
- Rank: Colonel

Ralph Sixtus Babatunde Bello-Fadile, also known as RSB Bello-Fadile, is a retired Nigerian Army Colonel who served in the Nigerian Army between 1971 and 1999.

== Background and education ==
Bello-Fadile is from Kabba town, Kabba/Bunu Local Government Area of Kogi State. He attended the Ilorin Teacher's College in Ilorin, Kwara State. He then joined the Nigerian Defence Academy in Kaduna in 1971.

== Military career ==
Bello Fadile was commissioned as a Second Lieutenant on 3 December 1971 into the Infantry Corps of the Nigerian Army. Bello-Fadile has a degree in law and also doctorate degree in law from Ahmadu Bello University, Zaria. He was the first PhD in law holder in the Nigerian Military. Arrested in 1995 during the military rule of Sani Abacha and was granted a state pardon by General Abdusalami Abubakar in 1999.
