= Operation Feed the Nation =

Nigerian agricultural extension and mobilization program

Operation Feed the Nation was a national agricultural extension and mobilization program instituted by the military government of Nigeria in 1976 as a measure to achieve self sufficiency in food crop production and inspire a new generation to return to farming.

== Background ==
In colonial era, integration of Nigeria into the world economy was driven by the production of cash crops such as palm oil, cocoa and groundnut and the initial official intervention programmes concentrated on cash crops. A resulting interest in innovation and entrepreneurship helped increase production of such crops. However, a larger number of small subsistence farms across the country produced majority of the food crops for local consumption. The farmers largely in the rural areas sold their surplus produce in feeding the nation. But by the early 1960s, many of the smaller farms were not profitable, leaving their own farms to lie fallow for months, the farmers supplemented income by working on farms producing export crops, in addition, a new generation of educated youth moved to the urban areas to look for paid employment. Between 1965 and 1970, per capital food production was stagnant. In the mid-1970s, the aftermath of a drought in the sahel region, stagnant crop production and an oil boom led to the increase food prices and importation of food crops. Food importation also shifted the food taste of an increasing urban class from locally produced crops to imported food such as rice and wheat, making Nigeria more dependent on food importation to feed the urban household. Government soon sought ways to curtail importation and rising food prices and promote a back to earth mobilization programme.

== The programme ==
The Federal Military Government of Nigeria launched the Operation ‘Feed the Nation’ Programme (OFN), as a result of the chronic inability of the agricultural sector of the economy to satisfy the food needs of the country, there was hope for a revival of interest in agriculture.

During the presentation of the 1976 budget, then head of state, General Obasanjo announced a proposed policy similar to a back to earth movement tagged Operation Feed the Nation, the programme was formally launched in May 1976 and in following months, appeals were directed to high schools, colleges and institutions to become self reliant in food production by growing their own produce and selling the surplus. Biology and agriculture teachers in secondary schools took a crash course in farming in order to include it as part of their curriculum and secondary school students were advised to work on farmers during extended vacations.

Apart from extensive publicity given to farming, government involvement included extension services, subsidized fertilizer distribution and an interest to increase commercial farming by large scale farmers. Aircraft were acquired to spray pesticides, poultry chicks were distributed to farmers. In addition, the government acquired large tracts of land to establish agricultural estates whereby plots were to be leased to farmers who receive extension support from the government.

The movement to increase entrepreneurship in the sector also involved a government mandate to the Nigerian Agriculture and Cooperative Bank to increase lending to farmers and agricultural credit scheme was initiated by the government.

In spite of a mass mobilization campaign to return to farming and focus on agricultural entrepreneurship, five years after, food production was still lagging behind population growth. A new administration again launched a new programme, Green Revolution to replace Operation Feed the Nation.
