= 2003–04 Portsmouth F.C. season =

Portsmouth
2003–04 season
- Chairman: Milan Mandarić
- Manager: Harry Redknapp
- Stadium: Fratton Park
- Premier League: 13th
- FA Cup: Sixth round
- League Cup: Fourth round
- Top goalscorer: League: Yakubu (16); All: Yakubu (19)
- Highest home attendance: 20,140 (in 5 matches) vs. Chelsea (11 February 2004) vs. Newcastle Utd (29 February 2004) vs. Southampton (21 March 2004) vs. Manchester Utd (17 April 2004) vs. Arsenal (4 May 2004)
- Lowest home attendance: 20,024 vs. Blackburn Rovers (20 September 2003)
- Average home league attendance: 20,082

During the 2003–04 English football season, Portsmouth F.C. competed in the Premier League. It was their first ever season in the Premiership and the first in English football's top flight since the 1987–88 season.

== Season summary ==
Portsmouth's Premiership debut (and only their second top division campaign during the last 45 years) was a fine one, as they finished 13th and established Fratton Park as one of the hardest Premiership grounds to get a result at. Only their dismal away form (with only two away wins all season) prevented them from finishing even higher and challenging for a European place, but it was still a very good season for the only newly promoted side to preserve their Premiership status.

After a good start to the season which saw Portsmouth top of the Premiership after three games, the team slumped into the relegation zone, but rallied and only lost one of their last ten matches to finish 13th – ahead of more established sides like Everton, Manchester City, Blackburn Rovers and Tottenham Hotspur. To their credit, they were one of the only two teams to remain unbeaten against Arsenal's "Invincibles" in the league during the season.

== Final league table ==
Pos	Team	Pld	W	D	L	GF	GA	GD	Pts	Qualification or relegation
11	Middlesbrough	38	13	9	16	44	52	−8	48	Qualification for the UEFA Cup first round (Note: Middlesbrough qualified as the 2003–04 Football League Cup winners.)
12	Southampton	38	12	11	15	44	45	−1	47	
13	Portsmouth	38	12	9	17	47	54	−7	45	
14	Tottenham Hotspur	38	13	6	19	47	57	−10	45	
15	Blackburn Rovers	38	12	8	18	51	59	−8	44	

Source: Premier League
Rules for classification: 1) points; 2) goal difference; 3) number of goals scored.

== Kit ==
Portsmouth introduced a new kit for the season, still manufactured under the club's own brand, Pompey Sport. ty remained the kit sponsors.

== Players ==
=== First-team squad ===
Note: Flags indicate national team as defined under FIFA eligibility rules; some limited exceptions apply. Players may hold more than one non-FIFA nationality.

No.	Pos.	Nation	Player
1	GK	TRI	Shaka Hislop (Note: Hislop was born in Hackney, England, and represented England at U-21 level, but also qualified to represent Trinidad and Tobago internationally and made his international debut for Trinidad and Tobago in 1999.)
2	DF	ENG	Linvoy Primus
3	DF	SCG	Dejan Stefanović
5	DF	AUS	Hayden Foxe
6	DF	NED	Arjan de Zeeuw
7	MF	SCO	Kevin Harper (Note: Harper was born in Oldham, England.)
8	MF	ENG	Tim Sherwood
9	FW	BUL	Svetoslav Todorov
10	FW	ENG	Teddy Sheringham
11	MF	SCO	Nigel Quashie (Note: Quashie was born in Southwark, England, and represented England at U-21 and B level, but also qualified to represent Scotland internationally through his grandfather and made his international debut for Scotland in May 2004.)
14	MF	ENG	Matthew Taylor
15	MF	SEN	Amdy Faye
16	MF	WAL	Carl Robinson
17	FW	FRA	Vincent Péricard (Note: Péricard was born in Efok, Cameroon, but also qualified to represent France internationally and has represented them at U-21 level.)
19	MF	ENG	Steve Stone
20	FW	NGA	Yakubu

No.	Pos.	Nation	Player
21	FW	JAM	Deon Burton (Note: Burton was born in Reading, England, but qualified to represent Jamaica internationally and made his international debut for Jamaica in September 1997.)
22	MF	SCO	Richard Hughes
23	MF	CZE	Patrik Berger
25	GK	NED	Harald Wapenaar
26	MF	ENG	Gary O'Neil
28	DF	FRA	Sébastien Schemmel
30	MF	RUS	Alexey Smertin (on loan from Chelsea)
31	DF	WAL	Richard Duffy
32	FW	COD	Lomana Tresor LuaLua (on loan from Newcastle United)
33	DF	ENG	John Curtis
34	DF	FIN	Petri Pasanen (on loan from Ajax Amsterdam)
37	FW	CRO	Ivica Mornar
38	FW	POL	Sebastian Olszar
39	MF	ISR	Eyal Berkovic
40	GK	ENG	Alan Knight

=== Left club during season ===
Note: Flags indicate national team as defined under FIFA eligibility rules; some limited exceptions apply. Players may hold more than one non-FIFA nationality.

No.	Pos.	Nation	Player
4	DF	CRO	Boris Živković (to Stuttgart)
18	FW	ENG	Lee Bradbury (to Walsall)
24	GK	JPN	Yoshi Kawaguchi (to FC Nordsjælland)
24	GK	CZE	Pavel Srníček (to West Ham United)
31	FW	GRN	Jason Roberts (Note: Roberts was born in Brent, England, but qualified to represent Grenada internationally through his father and made his international debut in 1999.) (on loan from West Bromwich Albion)
36	MF	ENG	Courtney Pitt (to Oxford United)

No.	Pos.	Nation	Player
—	DF	ENG	Lewis Buxton (on loan to AFC Bournemouth)
—	DF	ENG	Jamie Vincent (to Derby County)
—	MF	ENG	Neil Barrett (on loan to Dundee)
—	MF	ENG	Carl Pettefer (to Southend United)
—	FW	ENG	Rowan Vine (on loan to Colchester United)

=== Reserve squad ===
The following players did not appear for the first-team this season.

Note: Flags indicate national team as defined under FIFA eligibility rules; some limited exceptions apply. Players may hold more than one non-FIFA nationality.

No.	Pos.	Nation	Player
27	DF	ENG	Eddie Howe
29	FW	SCO	Mark Burchill
41	MF	ENG	Anthony Pulis (Note: Pulis was born in Bristol, England, but also qualified to represent Wales internationally and would later represent them at U-21 level.)
42	MF	ENG	Warren Hunt
43	DF	ENG	Shaun Cooper
—	GK	ENG	Chris Tardif
—	DF	ENG	Lewis Buxton

No.	Pos.	Nation	Player
—	DF	ENG	Terry Parker
—	DF	ENG	Gary Silk
—	MF	ENG	Neil Barrett
—	MF	ENG	Chris Clark
—	MF	SCO	Mark Casey
—	FW	ENG	James Keene
—	FW	ENG	Rowan Vine

== Transfers ==
=== In ===
- (Czech Republic) Patrik Berger – (England) Liverpool, free, 6 June 2003
- (Serbia and Montenegro) Dejan Stefanović – (Netherlands) Vitesse Arnhem, £1,850,000, 20 June 2003
- (Croatia) Boris Živković – (Germany) Bayer Leverkusen, free, 24 June 2003
- (England) Teddy Sheringham, (England) Tottenham Hotspur, free, 30 June 2003
- (France) Vincent Péricard – (Italy) Juventus, July 2003, £400,000
- (Netherlands) Harald Wapenaar – (Netherlands) Utrecht, 8 July 2003
- (Senegal) Amdy Faye – (France) Auxerre, undisclosed (estimated £1,500,000), 5 August 2003
- (France) Sébastien Schemmel – (England) West Ham United, undisclosed, 14 August 2003
- (Russia) Alexey Smertin – (England) Chelsea, season loan, 27 August 2003
- (Grenada) Jason Roberts – (England) West Bromwich Albion, loan, 1 September 2003
- (Czech Republic) Pavel Srníček – (Italy) Brescia, free, 1 September 2003
- (Finland) Petri Pasanen – (Netherlands) Ajax Amsterdam, 5 January 2004, loan
- (Israel) Eyal Berkovic – (England) Manchester City, £500,000, 8 January 2004
- (Wales) Richard Duffy – (Wales) Swansea City, undisclosed (six-figure sum), 26 January 2004,
- (Poland) Sebastian Olszar – (Austria) Admira Wacker Mödling, free, 26 January 2004
- (Croatia) Ivica Mornar – (Belgium) Anderlecht, £400,000, 29 January 2004
- (Democratic Republic of the Congo) Lomana Tresor LuaLua – (England) Newcastle United, three-month loan, £100,000 loan fee, 2 February 2004
- (England) John Curtis – (England) Leicester City, free, 2 February 2004
- (England) Alan Knight – free

=== Out ===
- (England) Justin Edinburgh – released (later joined (England) Billericay Town), 2003
- (England) Jason Crowe – released (later joined (England) Grimsby Town), 20 May 2003
- (England) Luke Nightingale – released (later joined (England) Southend United), 20 May 2003
- (England) Carl Tiler – retired, 20 May 2003
- (Italy) Gianluca Festa – (Italy) Cagliari, 13 June 2003
- (England) Paul Merson – (England) Walsall, undisclosed, 18 July 2003
- (England) Rowan Vine – (England) Colchester United, season loan, 7 August 2003
- (Japan) Yoshi Kawaguchi – (Denmark) FC Nordsjælland, 3 September 2003
- (Wales) Carl Robinson – (England) Rotherham United, month loan, 18 September 2003
- (Croatia) Boris Živković – (Germany) Stuttgart, free, 13 January 2004
- (Grenada) Jason Roberts – (England) West Bromwich Albion, loan ended, 14 January 2004
- (England) Jamie Vincent – (England) Derby County, free, 16 January 2004
- (England) Neil Barrett – (Scotland) Dundee, loan, 23 January 2004
- (Wales) Carl Robinson – (England) Sheffield United, loan, 30 January 2004
- (Czech Republic) Pavel Srníček – (England) West Ham United, month loan, 19 February 2004
- (England) Lee Bradbury – (England) Walsall, free, 25 March 2004
- (England) Lewis Buxton – (England) AFC Bournemouth, season loan, October 2003
- (England) Courtney Pitt – (England) Coventry City, loan
- (England) Courtney Pitt – (England) Luton Town, loan
- (Ivory Coast) Lassina Diabaté – (France) AC Ajaccio

== Results ==
=== Results per matchday ===
Matchday	1	2	3	4	5	6	7	8	9	10	11	12	13	14	15	16	17	18	19	20	21	22	23	24	25	26	27	28	29	30	31	32	33	34	35	36	37	38
Ground	H	A	H	A	A	H	A	H	H	A	A	H	A	H	A	H	A	H	A	A	H	A	H	A	H	H	A	A	H	A	A	H	H	A	H	H	A	H
Result	W	D	W	D	D	L	L	L	W	L	L	W	L	L	D	L	L	W	L	L	W	L	D	L	L	D	L	L	W	W	D	W	W	W	D	D	L	W
Position	7	6	3	3	5	8	9	10	9	11	11	11	11	14	16	18	18	15	16	18	17	17	17	17	17	17	17	18	18	17	16	15	14	13	14	14	14	13

Source: WorldFootball.com
A = Away; H = Home; W = Win; D = Draw; L = Loss

16 August 2003 1	Portsmouth	2–1	Aston Villa	Portsmouth, Hampshire
	Sheringham 41'; Berger 62'	Report	Barry 82' (pen.) (red card) 87'	Stadium: Fratton Park; Attendance: 20,101; Referee: Graham Barber

23 August 2003 2	Manchester City	1–1	Portsmouth	Manchester
	Sommeil 90'	Report	Yakubu 24'	Stadium: City of Manchester Stadium; Attendance: 46,287; Referee: Matt Messias

26 August 2003 3	Portsmouth	4–0	Bolton Wanderers	Portsmouth, Hampshire
	Sheringham 57', 88', 90'; Stone 47'	Report		Stadium: Fratton Park; Attendance: 20,113; Referee: Dermot Gallagher

30 August 2003 4	Wolverhampton Wanderers	0–0	Portsmouth	Wolverhampton, West Midlands
		Report		Stadium: Molineux; Attendance: 28,860; Referee: Andy D'Urso

13 September 2003 5	Arsenal	1–1	Portsmouth	Islington, London
	Henry 37' (pen.)	Report	Sheringham 26'	Stadium: Highbury; Attendance: 38,052; Referee: Alan Wiley

20 September 2003 6	Portsmouth	1–2	Blackburn Rovers	Portsmouth, Hampshire
	De Zeeuw 57'	Report	Neill 35'; Cole 43'	Stadium: Fratton Park; Attendance: 20,024; Referee: Paul Durkin

27 September 2003 7	Birmingham City	2–0	Portsmouth	Birmingham, West Midlands
	Clemence 21'; Lazardis 50'	Report		Stadium: St Andrew's; Attendance: 29,057; Referee: Steve Bennett

4 October 2003 8	Portsmouth	1–2	Charlton Athletic	Portsmouth, Hampshire
15:00 BST	Sheringham 34'	Report	Fortune 77'; Bartlett 90'	Stadium: Fratton Park; Attendance: 20,106; Referee: Graham Poll

18 October 2003 9	Portsmouth	1–0	Liverpool	Portsmouth, Hampshire
	Berger 4'	Report		Stadium: Fratton Park; Attendance: 20,123; Referee: Steve Dunn

25 October 2003 10	Newcastle United	3–0	Portsmouth	Newcastle upon Tyne, Tyneside
	Speed 17'; Shearer 28' (pen.); Ameobi 61'	Report		Stadium: St. James' Park; Attendance: 52,161; Referee: Paul Durkin

1 November 2003 11	Manchester United	3–0	Portsmouth	Trafford, Greater Manchester
	Forlán 37'; Ronaldo 79'; Keane 82'	Report		Stadium: Old Trafford; Attendance: 67,639; Referee: Neale Barry

8 November 2003 12	Portsmouth	6–1	Leeds United	Portsmouth, Hampshire
15:30 GMT	Stefanović 16'; O'Neil 45', 71'; Foxe 62'; Berger 75'; Yakubu 86'	Report	Smith 18'	Stadium: Fratton Park; Attendance: 20,112; Referee: Chris Foy

24 November 2003 13	Fulham	2–0	Portsmouth	Fulham, London
	Saha 30', 33'	Report	Berger (red card) 82'	Stadium: Loftus Road; Attendance: 15,624; Referee: Alan Wiley

29 November 2003 14	Portsmouth	0–2	Leicester City	Portsmouth, Hampshire
15:00		Report	Ferdinand 31'; Bent 33'	Stadium: Fratton Park; Attendance: 20,061; Referee: Mike Dean

6 December 2003 15	Middlesbrough	0–0	Portsmouth	Middlesbrough, North Yorkshire
15:00		Report		Stadium: Riverside Stadium; Attendance: 28,031; Referee: Steve Bennett

13 December 2003 16	Portsmouth	1–2	Everton	Portsmouth, Hampshire
	Roberts 15'	Report	Carsley 27'; Rooney 42'	Stadium: Fratton Park; Attendance: 20,101; Referee: Uriah Rennie

21 December 2003 17	Southampton	3–0	Portsmouth	Southampton, Hampshire
	Dodd 34'; Pahars 67'; Beattie 90'	Report		Stadium: St Mary's Stadium; Attendance: 31,697; Referee: Jeff Winter

26 December 2003 18	Portsmouth	2–0	Tottenham Hotspur	Portsmouth, Hampshire
	Berger 52', 68'	Report		Stadium: Fratton Park; Attendance: 20,078; Referee: Steve Dunn

28 December 2003 19	Chelsea	3–0	Portsmouth	Fulham, London
	Bridge 65'; Lampard 73'; Geremi 82'	Report		Stadium: Stamford Bridge; Attendance: 41,552; Referee: Graham Barber

6 January 2004 20	Aston Villa	2–1	Portsmouth	Birmingham, West Midlands
	Ángel 22'; Vassell 83'	Report	Yakubu 49'	Stadium: Villa Park; Attendance: 28,625; Referee: Jeff Winter

10 January 2004 21	Portsmouth	4–2	Manchester City	Portsmouth, Hampshire
	Sheringham 58'; Stefanović 19'; Yakubu 52', 78'	Report	Anelka 21'; Sibierski 45'	Stadium: Fratton Park; Attendance: 20,120; Referee: Matt Messias

17 January 2004 22	Bolton Wanderers	1–0	Portsmouth	Bolton, Greater Manchester
	Davies 53'	Report	Stefanović (red card) 90+1'	Stadium: Reebok Stadium; Referee: Phil Dowd

31 January 2003 23	Portsmouth	0–0	Wolverhampton Wanderers	Portsmouth, Hampshire
		Report		Stadium: Fratton Park; Attendance: 20,112; Referee: Howard Webb

7 February 2004 24	Tottenham Hotspur	4–3	Portsmouth	Haringey, London
	Defoe 13'; Keane 41', 78'; Poyet 89'	Report	Berkovic 39'; LuaLua 73'; Mornar 84'	Stadium: White Hart Lane; Attendance: 36,107; Referee: Peter Walton

11 February 2004 25	Portsmouth	0–2	Chelsea	Portsmouth, Hampshire
		Report	Parker 17'; Crespo 79'	Stadium: Fratton Park; Attendance: 20,140; Referee: Graham Poll

29 February 2004 26	Portsmouth	1–1	Newcastle United	Portsmouth, Hampshire
15:00	LuaLua 89'	Report	Bellamy 34'	Stadium: Fratton Park; Attendance: 20,140; Referee: Andy D'Urso

13 March 2004 27	Everton	1–0	Portsmouth	Merseyside, Liverpool
	Rooney 78'	Report		Stadium: Goodison Park; Referee: Neale Barry

17 March 2004 28	Liverpool	3–0	Portsmouth	Merseyside, Liverpool
	Hamann 5'; Owen 28', 58'	Report		Stadium: Anfield; Referee: Barry Knight

21 March 2004 29	Portsmouth	1–0	Southampton	Portsmouth, Hampshire
	Yakubu 68'	Report		Stadium: Fratton Park; Attendance: 20,140; Referee: Mark Halsey

27 March 2004 30	Blackburn Rovers	1–2	Portsmouth	Blackburn, Lancashire
	Tugay 37'	Report	Sheringham 17'; Yakubu 82'	Stadium: Ewood Park; Attendance: 22,855; Referee: Paul Durkin

10 April 2004 31	Charlton Athletic	1–1	Portsmouth	Greenwich, London
	Bartlett 8'	Report	Yakubu 65'	Stadium: The Valley; Attendance: 26,385; Referee: Andy D'Urso

12 April 2004 32	Portsmouth	3–1	Birmingham City	Portsmouth, Hampshire
	Stefanović 45'; LuaLua 62'; Yakubu 73' (pen.)	Report	Maik Taylor (red card) 45'; John 67'	Stadium: Fratton Park; Attendance: 20,104; Referee: Barry Knight

17 April 2004 33	Portsmouth	1–0	Manchester United	Portsmouth, Hampshire
	Stone 36'	Report		Stadium: Fratton Park; Attendance: 20,140; Referee: Neale Barry

25 April 2004 34	Leeds United	1–2	Portsmouth	Leeds, West Yorkshire
	Harte 82' (pen.)	Report	Yakubu 9'; LuaLua 51'	Stadium: Elland Road; Attendance: 39,273; Referee: Uriah Rennie

1 May 2004 35	Portsmouth	1–1	Fulham	Portsmouth, Hampshire
	Yakubu 80'	Report	McBride 85'	Stadium: Fratton Park; Attendance: 20,065; Referee: Steve Dunn

4 May 2004 36	Portsmouth	1–1	Arsenal	Portsmouth, Hampshire
	Yakubu 29'	Report	Reyes 49'	Stadium: Fratton Park; Attendance: 20,140; Referee: Mike Riley

8 May 2004 37	Leicester City	3–1	Portsmouth	Leicester, Leicestershire
	Taylor 6' (o.g.); Dickov 27'; Scowcroft 71'	Report	Quashie 66'	Stadium: Walkers Stadium; Attendance: 31,536; Referee: Graham Poll

15 May 2004 38	Portsmouth	5–1	Middlesbrough	Portsmouth, Hampshire
	Yakubu 4', 14' (pen.), 31', 83'; Sheringham 80'	Report	Zenden 27'	Stadium: Fratton Park; Attendance: 20,134; Referee: Mark Halsey

=== FA Cup ===
3 January 2004 2	Portsmouth	2–1	Blackpool	Portsmouth, Hampshire
	Schemmel 36'; Yakubu 90'	Report	Taylor 43'; Evans (red card) 90'	Stadium: Fratton Park; Attendance: 13,479; Referee: Steve Dunn

24 January 2004 3	Portsmouth	2–1	Scunthorpe United	Portsmouth, Hampshire
	Taylor 35', 66'	Report	Parton 86'	Stadium: Fratton Park; Attendance: 17,508; Referee: Graham Barber

15 February 2004 4	Liverpool	1–1	Portsmouth	Liverpool, Merseyside
	Owen 1'	Report	Taylor 75'	Stadium: Anfield; Attendance: 34,669; Referee: Mark Halsey

22 February 2004 5	Portsmouth	1–0	Liverpool	Portsmouth, Hampshire
	Hughes 71'	Report		Stadium: Fratton Park; Attendance: 19,529; Referee: Matt Messias

6 March 2004 6	Portsmouth	1–5	Arsenal	Portsmouth, Hampshire
18:00	Sheringham 90'	Report	Henry 25', 50'; Ljungberg 43', 57'; Touré 45'	Stadium: Fratton Park; Attendance: 20,137; Referee: Jeff Winter

=== League Cup ===
23 September 2003 2	Portsmouth	5–2	Northampton Town	Portsmouth, Hampshire
	Sherwood 13', ?'; Roberts 16', 59'; Taylor 40'	Report	Reid (red card) 9'; Hargreaves 76' (pen.); Dudfield 90'	Stadium: Fratton Park; Attendance: 11,130; Referee: David Crick

29 October 2003 3	Nottingham Forest	2–4 (a.e.t.)	Portsmouth	Nottingham, Nottinghamshire
	Bopp 42', 67'	Report	Walker 57' (o.g.); Yakubu 64', 108'; Roberts 101'	Stadium: City Ground; Attendance: 20,078; Referee: Howard Webb

2 December 2003 4	Southampton	2–0	Portsmouth	Southampton, Hampshire
	Beattie 33', 90' (pen.)	Report	De Zeeuw (red card) 90'	Stadium: St Mary's Stadium; Attendance: 16,791; Referee: Graham Poll

== Awards ==
- August: Player of the Month, Teddy Sheringham
- April: Manager of the Month, Harry Redknapp

== Statistics ==
=== Appearances and goals ===
As of 15 May 2004

No.	Pos	Nat	Player	Total		Premier League		FA Cup		League Cup	
No.	Pos	Nat	Player	Apps	Goals	Apps	Goals	Apps	Goals	Apps	Goals
Goalkeepers
1	GK	(Trinidad and Tobago) TRI	Shaka Hislop	34	0	30	0	4	0	0	0
25	GK	(Netherlands) NED	Harald Wapenaar	8	0	5	0	1	0	2	0
Defenders
2	DF	(England) ENG	Linvoy Primus	26	0	19+2	0	4	0	1	0
3	DF	(Serbia and Montenegro) SCG	Dejan Stefanović	38	3	32	3	4	0	2	0
5	DF	(Australia) AUS	Hayden Foxe	13	1	8+2	1	0	0	2+1	0
6	DF	(Netherlands) NED	Arjan De Zeeuw	42	1	36	1	4	0	2	0
14	DF	(England) ENG	Matthew Taylor	38	4	18+12	0	4+1	3	3	1
28	DF	(France) FRA	Sebastian Schemmel	18	1	12+2	0	1+1	1	2	0
31	DF	(Wales) WAL	Richard Duffy	1	0	0+1	0	0	0	0	0
33	DF	(England) ENG	John Curtis	6	0	5+1	0	0	0	0	0
34	DF	(Finland) FIN	Petri Pasanen	16	0	11+1	0	4	0	0	0
Midfielders
7	MF	(Scotland) SCO	Kevin Harper	9	0	0+7	0	2	0	0	0
8	MF	(England) ENG	Tim Sherwood	16	2	7+6	0	0	0	2+1	2
11	MF	(Scotland) SCO	Nigel Quashie	25	1	17+4	1	3	0	1	0
15	MF	(Senegal) SEN	Amdy Faye	31	0	27	0	2+1	0	1	0
16	MF	(Wales) WAL	Carl Robinson	3	0	0+1	0	0+2	0	0	0
19	MF	(England) ENG	Steve Stone	36	2	29+3	2	0+1	0	2+1	0
22	MF	(Scotland) SCO	Richard Hughes	15	1	8+3	0	2+2	1	0	0
23	MF	(Czech Republic) CZE	Patrik Berger	23	5	20	5	1	0	1+1	0
26	MF	(England) ENG	Gary O'Neil	5	2	3	2	0	0	1+1	0
30	MF	(Russia) RUS	Alexei Smertin	33	0	23+3	0	5	0	2	0
37	MF	(Croatia) CRO	Ivica Mornar	10	1	3+5	1	2	0	0	0
39	MF	(Israel) ISR	Eyal Berkovic	15	1	10+1	1	4	0	0	0
Forwards
9	FW	(Bulgaria) BUL	Svetoslav Todorov	1	0	1	0	0	0	0	0
10	FW	(England) ENG	Teddy Sheringham	38	10	25+7	9	2+1	1	3	0
17	FW	(France) FRA	Vincent Péricard	7	0	0+6	0	0	0	1	0
20	FW	(Nigeria) NGA	Yakubu	43	19	35+2	16	4	1	1+1	2
21	FW	(Jamaica) JAM	Deon Burton	2	0	0+1	0	1	0	0	0
32	FW	(Democratic Republic of the Congo) COD	Lomano Tresor LuaLua	15	4	10+5	4	0	0	0	0
38	FW	(Poland) POL	Sebastian Olszar	1	0	0	0	0+1	0	0	0
Players transferred out during the season
4	DF	(Croatia) CRO	Boris Živković	20	0	17+1	0	1	0	1	0
24	GK	(Czech Republic) CZE	Pavel Srníček	4	0	3	0	0	0	1	0
31	FW	(Grenada) GRN	Jason Roberts	12	4	4+6	1	0	0	2	3
