= 2003–04 Dundee F.C. season =

Dundee
2003–04 season
- Manager: Jim Duffy
- Stadium: Dens Park
- Scottish Premier League: 7th
- Scottish Cup: Third round
- Scottish League Cup: Semi-final
- UEFA Cup: First round
- Top goalscorer: League: Novo (19); All: Novo (25)
- Highest home attendance: 10,948 (vs Rangers, 28 December 2003) (SPL)
- Lowest home attendance: 4,942 (vs Kilmarnock, 8 May 2004) (SPL)
- Average home league attendance: 7,087
Home colours

The 2003–04 season saw Dundee compete in the Scottish Premier League where they finished in 7th position with 46 points.

== Final league table ==
Pos	Team	Pld	W	D	L	GF	GA	GD	Pts	Qualification or relegation (Note: Teams played each other three times (33 matches), before the league split into two groups (the top six and the bottom six) for the last five matches.)
5	Dundee United	38	13	10	15	47	60	−13	49	
6	Motherwell	38	12	10	16	42	49	−7	46	
7	Dundee	38	12	10	16	48	57	−9	46	
8	Hibernian	38	11	11	16	41	60	−19	44	Qualification for the UEFA Intertoto Cup second round (Note: Hibernian qualified for the 2004 UEFA Intertoto Cup as the highest placed team to apply to participate in the competition.)
9	Livingston	38	10	13	15	48	57	−9	43	

Source: Scottish Professional Football League
Rules for classification: 1) Points; 2) Goal difference; 3) Goals scored

== Results ==
Dundee's score comes first

=== Legend ===
Win	Draw	Loss

=== Scottish Premier League ===
Match	Date	Opponent	Venue	Result	Attendance	Scorers
1	9 August 2003	Motherwell	A	3–0	6,812	Rae 23', Wilkie 43', Smith 84'
2	17 August 2003	Dunfermline Athletic	H	0–2	7,750	
3	23 August 2003	Livingston	H	2–1	5,815	Novo (2) 17', 84'
4	31 August 2003	Kilmarnock	A	1–1	5,973	Novo 54'
5	13 September 2003	Celtic	H	0–1	10,647	
6	20 September 2003	Aberdeen	H	2–0	7,887	Cowan 28', Novo 82'
7	27 September 2003	Rangers	A	1–3	49,548	Novo 77'
8	4 October 2003	Heart of Midlothian	A	2–2	11,358	Novo 16', Rae 64'
9	18 October 2003	Partick Thistle	H	1–0	6,497	Novo 55'
10	26 October 2003	Dundee United	A	1–1	12,292	Novo 20'
11	1 November 2003	Hibernian	H	1–1	7,032	Novo 33'
12	8 November 2003	Motherwell	H	0–1	6,374	
13	22 November 2003	Dunfermline Athletic	A	0–2	5,490	
14	29 November 2003	Livingston	A	1–1	4,625	Fotheringham 84'
15	6 December 2003	Kilmarnock	H	1–2	6,954	Novo 32'
16	13 December 2003	Celtic	A	2–3	57,573	Fotheringham 20', Mair 90'
17	20 December 2003	Aberdeen	A	2–2	10,354	Hutchinson 45', Novo 52'
18	28 December 2003	Rangers	H	0–2	10,948	
19	6 January 2004	Heart of Midlothian	H	1–2	6,387	McLean 80'
20	17 January 2004	Partick Thistle	A	2–1	4,690	Novo 85', Smith 89'
21	25 January 2004	Dundee United	H	2–1	10,747	Novo 48', Lovell 70'
22	25 January 2004	Hibernian	A	1–1	8,023	Fotheringham 44'
23	11 February 2004	Motherwell	A	3–5	4,247	Barrett (2) 11', 28', Novo 58'
24	14 February 2004	Dunfermline Athletic	H	0–1	5,643	
25	21 February 2004	Livingston	H	1–0	6,108	Milne 59'
26	28 February 2004	Kilmarnock	A	2–4	5,454	Novo 6', Milne 62'
27	13 March 2004	Aberdeen	H	1–1	6,839	Fotheringham 8'
28	17 March 2004	Celtic	H	1–2	8,539	Kneißl 90'
29	20 March 2004	Rangers	A	0–4	49,364	
30	27 March 2004	Heart of Midlothian	A	1–3	10,491	Milne 8'
31	3 April 2004	Partick Thistle	H	2–1	5,084	Milne 2', Novo 90'
32	11 April 2004	Dundee United	A	2–2	9,571	Lovell 18', Milne 39'
33	17 April 2004	Hibernian	H	2–2	5,508	Lovell 38', Milne 90'
34	24 April 2004	Partick Thistle	A	1–0	2,727	Lovell 71'
35	1 May 2004	Hibernian	A	0–1	6,180	
36	8 May 2004	Kilmarnock	H	2–0	4,942	Milne 6', Novo 80'
37	12 May 2004	Livingston	H	2–0	4,954	Novo (2) 5', 90'
38	15 May 2004	Aberdeen	A	2–1	7,878	Milne 73', Lovell 90'

=== Scottish Cup ===
Match	Date	Opponent	Venue	Result	Attendance	Scorers
R3	10 January 2004	Aberdeen	A	0–0	11,012	
R3 Replay	21 January 2004	Aberdeen	H	2–3	5,857	Robb 9', Novo 90'

=== Scottish League Cup ===
Match	Date	Opponent	Venue	Result	Attendance	Scorers
R3	29 October 2003	Clyde	A	5–2	1,701	Novo 4', Wilkie 66', Ravanelli (3) 73', 74', 80'
QF	3 December 2003	Heart of Midlothian	H	1–0	7,130	Linn 107'
SF	3 February 2004	Livingston	H	0–1	6,660	

=== UEFA Cup ===
Match	Date	Opponent	Venue	Result	Attendance	Scorers
QR 1st leg	14 August 2003	Vllaznia Shkodër	A	2–0	10,000	Lovell 44', Novo 47'
QR 2nd leg	28 August 2003	Vllaznia Shkodër	H	4–0	8,200	Novo (2) 2', 89', Sara 40', Rae 50'
R1 1st leg	24 September 2003	Perugia	H	1–2	9,111	Novo 64'
R1 2nd leg	15 October 2003	Perugia	A	0–1	8,685	
