= Neil Barrett (footballer) =

English footballer

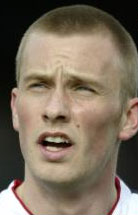
- Barrett playing for Ebbsfleet United in 2007

Personal information
- Full name: Neil William Barrett
- Date of birth: 24 December 1981 (age 44)
- Place of birth: Tooting, England
- Height: 5 ft 10 in (1.78 m)
- Position: Central midfielder

Youth career
- –2001: Chelsea

Senior career*
Years	Team	Apps	(Gls)
2001–2004	Portsmouth	26	(2)
2004	→ Dundee (loan)	12	(2)
2004–2005	Dundee	30	(2)
2005–2006	Livingston	9	(0)
2007	Woking	7	(0)
2007–2009	Ebbsfleet United	63	(8)
2009–2011	York City	63	(6)
2011	Havant & Waterlooville	5	(0)
2011–2013	Ebbsfleet United	68	(2)
2013–2014	Basingstoke Town	20	(4)
2014–2015	Leatherhead	10	(0)
2015–2016	Metropolitan Police	17	(1)
Total		327	(27)

International career
- England schools
- * Club domestic league appearances and goals

Neil William Barrett (born 24 December 1981) is an English former professional footballer who played as a central midfielder. He played in the Football League for Portsmouth and in the Scottish Premier League for Dundee and Livingston.

Barrett started his career in the youth system of Chelsea, before joining Portsmouth in 2001. He made over 20 appearances in his first season with Portsmouth, but having not played over a season-and-a-half he moved to Dundee on loan. He joined them permanently in 2004, but left a year later following their relegation from the Scottish Premier League. Following a period with Livingston, he signed for Conference National club Woking in 2007. After half a season with them he joined Ebbsfleet United, and played for them in their victory in the 2008 FA Trophy Final at Wembley Stadium.

Barrett left Ebbsfleet after two seasons to sign for York City in 2009 and played for them in the 2010 Conference Premier play-off final at Wembley Stadium. He was released by York in 2011 and after a short spell with Havant & Waterlooville in the Conference South he returned to Ebbsfleet United. After their relegation to the Conference South in 2013 he signed for their divisional rivals Basingstoke Town, but was released by them after one season. He finished his career with spells in the Isthmian League Premier Division with Leatherhead and Metropolitan Police.

== Career ==
=== Chelsea and Portsmouth ===
Barrett started his career as a trainee in the Chelsea youth system. While at the club he was an England schools international. He joined First Division club Portsmouth on 25 June 2001 on a free transfer and made his first-team debut in a 1–0 victory away to Stockport County on 25 August. His first goal for Portsmouth came with the equaliser against Gillingham on 8 September 2001 with a header from a Robert Prosinečki cross, in a match that finished as a 2–1 victory. Barrett was offered a new contract with Portsmouth in October 2001 after impressing in the first team. He finished the 2001–02 season with 26 appearances and two goals, despite not playing any matches for Portsmouth from March 2002.

Barrett was taken to hospital with a suspected broken knee suffered during a reserve-team match against Bristol City in September 2002, although an X-ray later confirmed there was no break. However, tests were carried out and he was expected to be out of the team for six weeks to recover from the injury. Having fallen out of favour at Portsmouth, he had a trial at Notts County in December 2002 and manager Bill Dearden commented that Barrett "could be a reasonable prospect". He finished 2002–03 with no appearances for Portsmouth and was told by manager Harry Redknapp he was surplus to requirements. He had a one-week trial with Wimbledon in August 2003, having been told he could leave Portsmouth.

=== Dundee ===
Having made no appearances for Portsmouth up to that point during 2003–04, Barrett joined Scottish Premier League (SPL) club Dundee on loan until the end of the season on 23 January 2004. His debut came two days later in the 2–1 victory over Dundee United in a Dundee derby match, in which he made a reasonable contribution and was cautioned for a "bone-crunching" challenge on Charlie Miller. He scored his first two goals for Dundee in the Scottish League Cup against Motherwell, with a shot set up by Sebastian Kneißl and a header, although Dundee went on to lose 5–3. He finished the loan period with 13 appearances and two goals, during which he had to deal with a "serious" ankle injury.

He joined Dundee permanently on 18 July 2004, signing a one-year contract, after having his contract at Portsmouth cancelled. He scored his first goal of 2004–05 on 18 December 2004 with a 57th-minute goal against Aberdeen that was set up by Fabián Caballero, which earned his team a 1–0 victory. He finished the season with 32 appearances and two goals while Dundee were relegated to the Scottish First Division, and was released by the club in May 2001.

=== Livingston ===
Barrett had a trial with Major League Soccer team the New York/New Jersey MetroStars, and claimed he was offered a two-year contract, although this claim was denied by an organisation spokesman. He started a trial with League Two club Oxford United in August 2005 and in his first match was substituted after six minutes after sustaining a head injury. He resumed playing in the SPL after signing for Livingston on 9 September 2005, on a contract until January 2006, with the option of it being extended for a further three years, following a successful trial. He made his debut two days later in a 4–1 defeat to Hearts, during which he conceded a penalty kick. He made 11 appearances for Livingston, with his last coming in December 2005. Conference National club Exeter City handed him a one-week trial in September 2006, and after training with them for six weeks he was offered a contract until January 2007.

=== Woking ===
He eventually signed for another Conference National club, Woking, in January 2007 after being recommended to the club by former Dundee teammate Tom Hutchinson and he made his debut in a 2–0 victory over Altrincham on 20 January, in which he had a goal disallowed that was adjudged to be offside. Barrett missed some matches because of injury and finished 2006–07 with seven appearances for Woking, and manager Frank Gray wanted him to return to the club for pre-season training.

=== Ebbsfleet United ===
He signed for Woking's Conference Premier rivals Ebbsfleet United on a free transfer on 19 June 2007 as a replacement for Mark DeBolla. He made his debut in a 2–1 victory over Northwich Victoria on 11 August 2007. He sustained an ankle injury in the second match of 2007–08, which meant he was expected to be unable to play for six weeks, before he made a "surprise" return after four weeks in a 1–1 draw with Burton Albion. He scored his first goal with a shot from 20 yards, which was Ebbsfleet's first goal in a 4–1 victory over Grays Athletic. He went on to score goals in two consecutive matches, with strikes in victories over Burton and Weymouth. Barrett played for Ebbsfleet in the 2008 FA Trophy Final at Wembley Stadium on 10 May 2008, which the team won 1–0 against Torquay United. He finished the season with 44 appearances and three goals, after which he signed a new one-year contract with Ebbsfleet. He played for Ebbsfleet in their 3–2 defeat to Stevenage Borough in the semi-final first-leg of the FA Trophy on 14 March 2009, during which he sustained a broken jaw while scoring a goal, which ruled him out for the remainder of 2008–09. He finished the season with 37 appearances for Ebbsfleet, scoring seven goals.

=== York City ===
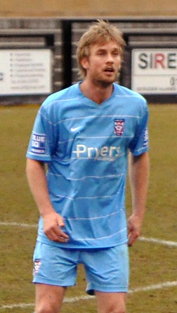
Barrett playing for York City in 2010

Barrett signed for Ebbsfleet's Conference Premier rivals York City on a free transfer on 29 June 2009. He made his debut in a 2–1 defeat to Oxford on 8 August 2009, before scoring his first goal for the club with the opener in a 1–1 draw with Luton Town on 20 October with a shot in the bottom corner. He scored the opening goal in a 3–1 defeat to Premier League team Stoke City in the FA Cup third round on 2 January 2010, with a header from an Alex Lawless free kick. He picked up a hamstring injury during March 2010, missing one match before making his return in a 1–0 victory over Mansfield Town later that month. He played in both legs of York's play-off semi-final victory over Luton, which finished 2–0 on aggregate. He signed a new one-year contract with York on 13 May 2010. He started in the 2010 Conference Premier play-off final at Wembley Stadium on 16 May, being substituted on 81 minutes, with York losing 3–1 to Oxford. He finished 2009–10 with 51 appearances and five goals for York.

Barrett made his first appearance of 2010–11 in the second match, starting in a 0–0 draw away to Grimsby Town on 17 August 2010. He scored his first goal of the season with an effort from six yards out to score the final goal in a 4–0 victory away to Rushden & Diamonds on 20 November 2010. He finished the season with 25 appearances and two goals before being released on 23 June 2011 after being told he could find another club.

=== Havant & Waterlooville ===
Following his release by York, Barrett went on trial with Luton and played the first half of their first friendly of the 2011–12 pre-season, a 4–2 victory away to Hitchin Town. He subsequently went on trial with Kingstonian of the Isthmian League Premier Division and played in a friendly against former club Woking. His next move came on 9 September 2011, when he signed for Havant & Waterlooville of the Conference South on non-contract terms, making his debut the following day after starting in a 2–2 draw at home to Sutton United. He was released by Havant in October 2011 after making seven appearances for the club.

=== Return to Ebbsfleet United ===
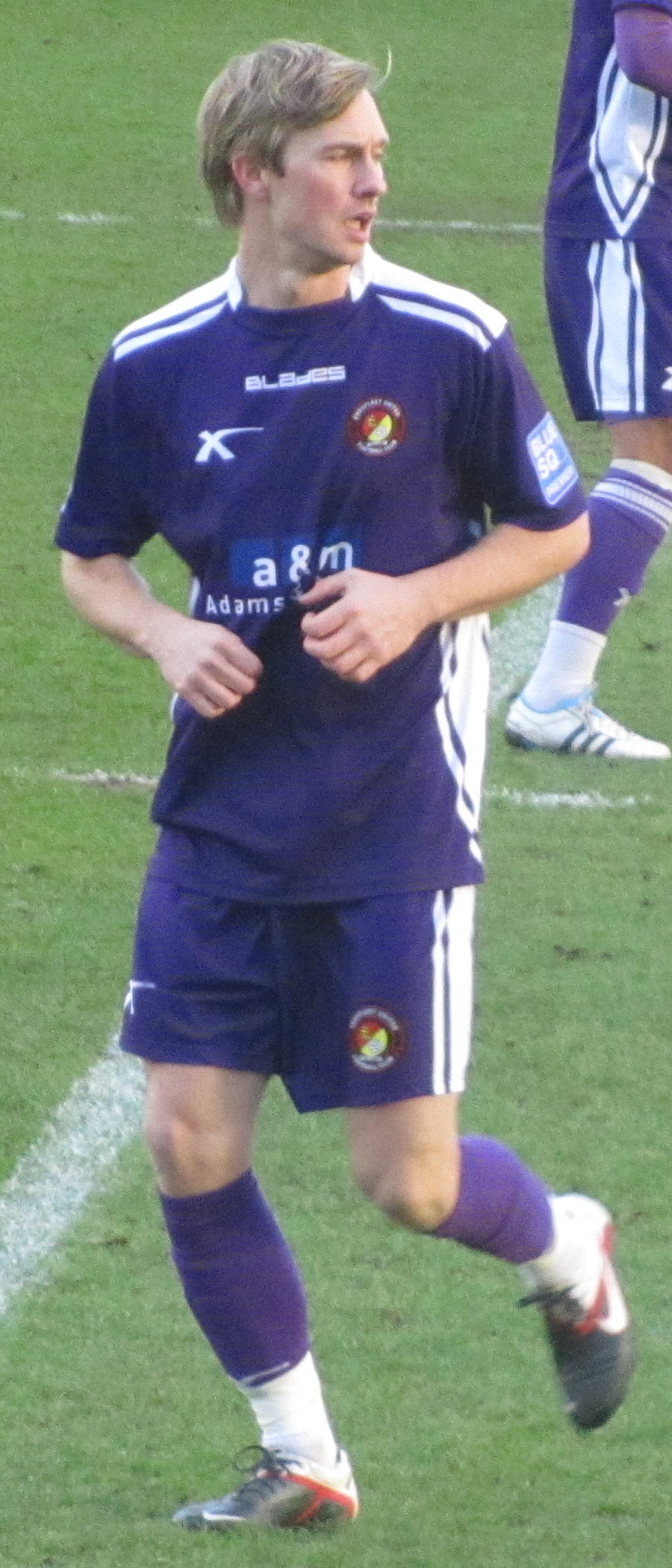
Barrett playing for Ebbsfleet United in 2012

Barrett returned to Conference Premier club Ebbsfleet United on 4 November 2011 on non-contract terms after contacting manager Liam Daish over the possibility of signing. His second debut for the club came the following day in a 1–0 away win over Newport County, and scored his first goal of 2011–12 came with a header in a 3–2 win away to Gateshead on 3 March 2012. Barrett made 28 appearances and score done goal as Ebbsfleet finished 14th in the Conference Premier, before signing a new one-year contract with the club in July 2012. He combined playing with being Ebbsfleet's commercial manager during 2011–12. Barrett missed only four matches for Ebbsfleet in 2012–13, making 45 appearances and scoring one goal, as the team were relegated to the Conference South after ranking 23rd in the Conference Premier table.

=== Later career ===
Barrett signed for Conference South club Basingstoke Town on 1 July 2013. His debut came in Basingstoke's 2–1 win away against Concord Rangers on 17 August 2013, before scoring his first goal for the club in a 2–0 home win over Eastleigh on 24 August. He made 28 appearances and scored four goals in 2013–14 as Basingstoke finished in 14th place in the Conference South table. He was released by the club in May 2014.

Barrett joined Isthmian League Premier Division club Leatherhead during 2014–15 and made his debut as a 73rd-minute substitute in their 2–1 away defeat to Maidstone United on 9 December 2014. He made 11 appearances as they achieved a 10th-place finish in the Isthmian League Premier Division table. Barrett signed for Leatherhead's divisional rivals Metropolitan Police in September 2015, and made his debut in a 1–1 home draw with VCD Athletic on 19 September. He later worked as the club's commercial manager.

== Style of play ==
Barrett played as a central midfielder and provided "plenty of drive in midfield". He described himself as being "one to get in the box" and having "a bit of a knack of being in the right place at the right time". He was described as being "not afraid of sticking his foot in". Ebbsfleet manager Liam Daish commented that "He will bring a physical presence to our midfield and is capable of getting his name on the score sheet." and while at the club was pivotal in midfield.

== Personal life ==
Barrett was born in Tooting, Greater London. His wife Rebecca, whom he married in Leatherhead, Surrey on 29 May 2010, works as a flight attendant for Virgin Atlantic and he has 3 sons called George, Bertie and Alfred.

== Career statistics ==
Appearances and goals by club, season and competition
Club	Season	League			National Cup (Note: Includes Scottish Cup, FA Cup)		League Cup (Note: Includes Scottish League Cup)		Other		Total	
Club	Season	Division	Apps	Goals	Apps	Goals	Apps	Goals	Apps	Goals	Apps	Goals
Portsmouth	2001–02	First Division	26	2	0	0	0	0	—		26	2
Portsmouth	2002–03	First Division	0	0	0	0	0	0	—		0	0
Portsmouth	2003–04	Premier League	0	0	0	0	0	0	—		0	0
Portsmouth	Total		26	2	0	0	0	0	—		26	2
Dundee (loan)	2003–04	Scottish Premier League	12	2	—		1	0	—		13	2
Dundee	2004–05	Scottish Premier League	30	2	1	0	1	0	—		32	2
Dundee	Total		42	4	1	0	2	0	—		45	4
Livingston	2005–06	Scottish Premier League	9	0	0	0	2	0	—		11	0
Woking	2006–07	Conference National	7	0	—		—		—		7	0
Ebbsfleet United	2007–08	Conference Premier	34	2	1	0	—		9 (Note: Eight appearances and one goal in FA Trophy, one appearance in Conference League Cup)	1	44	3
Ebbsfleet United	2008–09	Conference Premier	29	6	3	0	—		5 (Note: Appearance(s) in FA Trophy)	1	37	7
Ebbsfleet United	Total		63	8	4	0	—		14	2	81	10
York City	2009–10	Conference Premier	41	4	4	1	—		6 (Note: Three appearances in FA Trophy, three in Conference Premier play-offs)	0	51	5
York City	2010–11	Conference Premier	22	2	3	0	—		0	0	25	2
York City	Total		63	6	7	1	—		6	0	76	7
Havant & Waterlooville	2011–12	Conference South	5	0	2	0	—		—		7	0
Ebbsfleet United	2011–12	Conference Premier	26	1	—		—		2	0	28	1
Ebbsfleet United	2012–13	Conference Premier	42	1	2	0	—		1	0	45	1
Ebbsfleet United	Total		68	2	2	0	—		3	0	73	2
Basingstoke Town	2013–14	Conference South	20	4	1	0	—		7 (Note: Four appearances in Hampshire Senior Cup, three in FA Trophy)	0	28	4
Leatherhead	2014–15	Isthmian League Premier Division	10	0	—		—		1 (Note: Appearance in Surrey Senior Cup)	0	11	0
Leatherhead	2015–16	Isthmian League Premier Division	0	0	0	0	—		1 (Note: Appearance in Isthmian League Cup)	0	1	0
Leatherhead	Total		10	0	0	0	—		2	0	12	0
Metropolitan Police	2015–16	Isthmian League Premier Division	17	1	—		—		6 (Note: Three appearances in FA Trophy, one in London Senior Cup, two appearances and two goals in Surrey Senior Cup)	2	23	3
Career total			327	27	17	1	4	0	38	4	386	32

== Honours ==
Ebbsfleet United

- FA Trophy: 2007–08
