= 2001–02 Portsmouth F.C. season =

Portsmouth
2001–02 season
- Chairman: Milan Mandaric
- Manager: Graham Rix (until 25 March); Harry Redknapp (from 25 March)
- Stadium: Fratton Park
- First Division: 17th
- FA Cup: Third round
- League Cup: First round
- Top goalscorer: League: Crouch (18); All: Crouch (19)
- Highest home attendance: 19,103 vs. Manchester City (17 November 2001)
- Lowest home attendance: 12,336 vs Coventry City (26 February 2002)
- Average home league attendance: 15,719

During the 2001–02 English football season, Portsmouth F.C. competed in the Football League First Division.

== Season summary ==
Portsmouth started the season promisingly but slumped during the winter and were involved in a relegation battle for the second half of the season. A string of poor results, including a 4–1 home loss in the FA Cup to bottom of the Football League Leyton Orient, meant that Director of Football Harry Redknapp was given more responsibilities until he eventually replaced Rix as team manager toward the end of the season. The goals of striker Peter Crouch and the creativity of veteran Croatian midfielder Robert Prosinečki played a crucial role in saving Portsmouth from relegation. Despite only spending the one season with the club before moving to Slovenian side Olimpija Ljubljana, such was the role Prosinečki played that he is now widely regarded as one of the greatest players to ever grace Fratton Park. Crouch was sold to Aston Villa near the end of the season for £5 million, which was used in the ensuing summer to rebuild the squad.

Tragedy struck the club six days before the start of the season when goalkeeper Aaron Flahavan was killed in a car crash near Bournemouth on 5 August. Both Portsmouth and Flahavan's youth club Southampton retired the number 1 jersey during the season, out of respect for Flahavan, who had played more than 100 games for Portsmouth since making his debut five years earlier.

== Kit ==
Portsmouth retained the previous season's kit, manufactured by the club's own brand, Pompey Sport, and sponsored by Bishop's Printers.

== Final league table ==
Pos	Team	Pld	W	D	L	GF	GA	GD	Pts
15	Bradford City	46	15	10	21	69	76	−7	55
16	Nottingham Forest	46	12	18	16	50	51	−1	54
17	Portsmouth	46	13	14	19	60	72	−12	53
18	Walsall	46	13	12	21	51	71	−20	51
19	Grimsby Town	46	12	14	20	50	72	−22	50

Rules for classification: 1) Points; 2) Goal difference; 3) Goals scored

Results summary

Overall								Home						Away					
Pld	W	D	L	GF	GA	GD	Pts	W	D	L	GF	GA	GD	W	D	L	GF	GA	GD
46	13	14	19	60	72	−12	53	9	6	8	36	31	+5	4	8	11	24	41	−17

Source: 2001-02 Football League First Division table

Results by round

Round	1	2	3	4	5	6	7	8	9	10	11	12	13	14	15	16	17	18	19	20	21	22	23	24	25	26	27	28	29	30	31	32	33	34	35	36	37	38	39	40	41	42	43	44	45	46
Ground	A	H	A	H	H	A	H	A	A	H	A	A	H	A	H	H	A	A	H	A	H	H	H	A	H	A	A	A	H	A	H	A	H	A	H	H	A	H	H	A	H	A	H	A	H	A
Result	D	L	W	W	W	D	W	D	L	L	W	L	W	D	L	D	W	D	W	L	W	L	L	L	W	L	L	L	L	W	D	L	D	L	W	D	D	W	L	D	D	L	D	D	L	L
Position	10	17	12	8	7	5	2	3	5	7	5	7	7	9	12	11	9	10	10	10	9	10	11	11	12	13	14	16	16	16	15	16	16	17	17	17	16	16	16	16	15	16	15	17	17	17

Source: 11v11.com: 2001–02 Portsmouth results
A = Away; H = Home; W = Win; D = Draw; L = Loss

== Results ==
Portsmouth's score comes first

=== Legend ===
Win	Draw	Loss

=== Football League First Division ===
Date	Opponent	Venue	Result	Attendance	Scorers
11 August 2001	Wolverhampton Wanderers	A	2–2	23,012	Crouch, Crowe
18 August 2001	Bradford City	H	0–1	17,239	
25 August 2001	Stockport County	A	1–0	5,090	Prosinečki
27 August 2001	Grimsby Town	H	4–2	13,614	Burchill (2), Crouch (2)
8 September 2001	Gillingham	H	2–1	17,224	Barrett, Zamperini
12 September 2001	Wimbledon	A	3–3	7,138	Burchill, Crouch, Bradbury (pen)
15 September 2001	Crystal Palace	H	4–2	18,149	Zamperini, Prosinečki, Burchill (pen), Crouch
18 September 2001	Walsall	A	0–0	6,153	
22 September 2001	Coventry City	A	0–2	18,303	
25 September 2001	West Bromwich Albion	H	1–2	17,287	Prosinečki (pen)
28 September 2001	Barnsley	A	4–1	11,660	Vincent, Crouch, Bradbury (2, 1 pen)
12 October 2001	Rotherham United	A	1–2	6,427	Crouch
20 October 2001	Sheffield United	H	1–0	15,538	Edinburgh
23 October 2001	Norwich City	A	0–0	19,962	
27 October 2001	Preston North End	H	0–1	15,402	
30 October 2001	Birmingham City	H	1–1	15,612	Bradbury
3 November 2001	Sheffield Wednesday	A	3–2	18,212	Crouch (2), Barrett
10 November 2001	Burnley	A	1–1	14,123	Crouch
17 November 2001	Manchester City	H	2–1	19,103	Bradbury, Crouch
25 November 2001	Watford	A	0–3	15,631	
28 November 2001	Nottingham Forest	H	3–2	14,837	Hjelde (own goal), Bradbury (2, 1 pen)
2 December 2001	Norwich City	H	1–2	13,286	Harper
8 December 2001	Crewe Alexandra	H	2–4	14,430	Lovell, Crouch
13 December 2001	Millwall	A	0–1	11,527	
22 December 2001	Stockport County	H	2–0	13,887	Crouch, Lovell
26 December 2001	Gillingham	A	0–2	10,477	
29 December 2001	Grimsby Town	A	1–3	5,217	Crouch
12 January 2002	Bradford City	A	1–3	14,306	Primus
17 January 2002	Wolverhampton Wanderers	H	2–3	13,105	Quashie, Prosinečki
30 January 2002	Nottingham Forest	A	1–0	26,476	Prosinečki
2 February 2002	Barnsley	H	4–4	12,756	Prosinečki (3, 1 pen), Primus
9 February 2002	Sheffield United	A	3–4	17,553	Crouch, Prosinečki, Quashie
16 February 2002	Rotherham United	H	0–0	13,313	
23 February 2002	West Bromwich Albion	A	0–5	21,028	
26 February 2002	Coventry City	H	1–0	12,336	Crouch
2 March 2002	Walsall	H	1–1	13,203	Crouch
5 March 2002	Crystal Palace	A	0–0	15,915	
9 March 2002	Millwall	H	3–0	15,221	Biagini, O'Neil, Pitt
12 March 2002	Wimbledon	H	1–2	13,118	Biagini
16 March 2002	Crewe Alexandra	A	1–1	7,170	Crouch
23 March 2002	Sheffield Wednesday	H	0–0	14,819	
30 March 2002	Preston North End	A	0–2	16,832	
1 April 2002	Burnley	H	1–1	18,020	Todorov
7 April 2002	Birmingham City	A	1–1	25,030	Pitt
13 April 2002	Watford	H	0–1	16,302	
21 April 2002	Manchester City	A	1–3	34,657	Pitt

=== FA Cup ===
Round	Date	Opponent	Venue	Result	Attendance	Goalscorers
R3	16 January 2002	Leyton Orient	H	1–4	12,936	Smith (own goal)

=== League Cup ===
Round	Date	Opponent	Venue	Result	Attendance	Goalscorers
R1	21 August 2001	Colchester United	H	1–2	7,078	Crouch

== Squad ==
Note: Flags indicate national team as defined under FIFA eligibility rules; some limited exceptions apply. Players may hold more than one non-FIFA nationality.

No.	Pos.	Nation	Player
2	DF	(England) ENG	Jason Crowe
3	DF	(England) ENG	Jamie Vincent
4	MF	(England) ENG	Shaun Derry
5	DF	(England) ENG	Eddie Howe
6	DF	(England) ENG	Carl Tiler
7	MF	(Scotland) SCO	Kevin Harper
8	MF	(Croatia) CRO	Robert Prosinečki
10	FW	(England) ENG	Lee Bradbury
11	MF	(Scotland) SCO	Nigel Quashie
13	DF	(Italy) ITA	Alessandro Zamperini
14	GK	Guernsey	Chris Tardif
15	MF	(England) ENG	Courtney Pitt
16	DF	(Denmark) DEN	Thomas Thøgersen
17	MF	(England) ENG	Tom Curtis
19	FW	(England) ENG	Luke Nightingale
20	FW	(England) ENG	Rory Allen
21	DF	(England) ENG	Justin Edinburgh
22	FW	(Slovenia) SVN	Mladen Rudonja
23	MF	(Scotland) SCO	Garry Brady
24	DF	(England) ENG	Scott Hiley

No.	Pos.	Nation	Player
25	FW	(England) ENG	Steve Lovell
26	MF	(England) ENG	Gary O'Neil
27	MF	(Brazil) BRA	Stefani Miglioranzi
28	MF	(Greece) GRE	Michael Panopoulos
29	MF	(England) ENG	Mark Summerbell (on loan from Middlesbrough)
30	DF	(England) ENG	Linvoy Primus
31	GK	(England) ENG	Dave Beasant
32	FW	(England) ENG	Rowan Vine
33	DF	(England) ENG	Lewis Buxton
34	MF	(England) ENG	Neil Barrett
35	FW	(Scotland) SCO	Mark Burchill
36	MF	(France) FRA	Uliano Courville
37	GK	(Japan) JPN	Yoshikatsu Kawaguchi
38	MF	(England) ENG	Carl Pettefer
39	DF	(Scotland) SCO	Scott Wilson (on loan from Rangers)
40	GK	(England) ENG	Alan Knight
41	FW	(Argentina) ARG	Leonardo Biagini (on loan from Mallorca)
42	DF	(England) ENG	Shaun Cooper
43	FW	(Bulgaria) BUL	Svetoslav Todorov

=== Left club during season ===
Note: Flags indicate national team as defined under FIFA eligibility rules; some limited exceptions apply. Players may hold more than one non-FIFA nationality.

No.	Pos.	Nation	Player
1	GK	(England) ENG	Aaron Flahavan (died)
5	DF	(Jamaica) JAM	Darren Moore (to West Bromwich Albion)
9	FW	(England) ENG	Peter Crouch (to Aston Villa)
18	DF	(Northern Ireland) NIR	Dave Waterman (to Oxford United)

No.	Pos.	Nation	Player
22	FW	(England) ENG	Lee Mills (to Coventry City)
29	MF	(Wales) WAL	Ceri Hughes (to Cardiff City)
37	GK	(Federal Republic of Yugoslavia) YUG	Saša Ilić (on loan from Charlton Athletic)
39	GK	(Australia) AUS	Andy Petterson (to West Bromwich Albion)
