= Peter Crouch =

English footballer (born 1981)

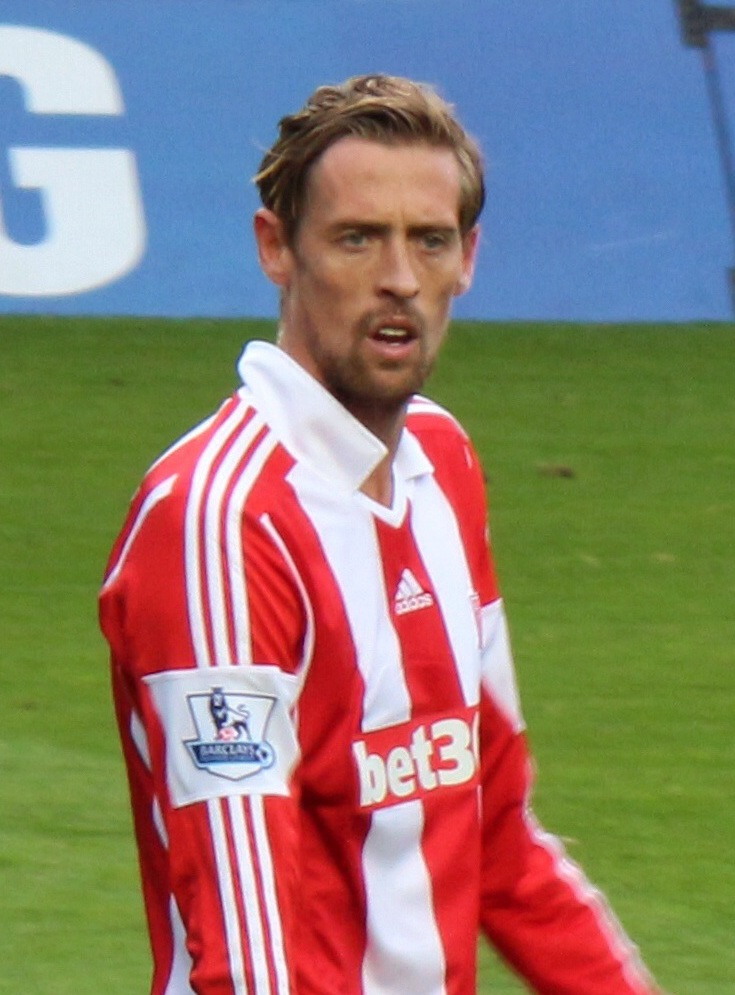
- Crouch playing for Stoke City in 2014

Personal information
- Full name: Peter James Crouch
- Date of birth: 30 January 1981 (age 45)
- Place of birth: Macclesfield, England
- Height: 6 ft 7 in (2.01 m)
- Position: Striker

Youth career
- 1991–1993: Brentford
- 1994–1995: Queens Park Rangers
- 1995–1998: Tottenham Hotspur

Senior career*
Years	Team	Apps	(Gls)
1998–2000	Tottenham Hotspur	0	(0)
2000	→ Dulwich Hamlet (loan)	6	(1)
2000	→ IFK Hässleholm (loan)	8	(3)
2000–2001	Queens Park Rangers	42	(10)
2001–2002	Portsmouth	37	(18)
2002–2004	Aston Villa	37	(6)
2003	→ Norwich City (loan)	15	(4)
2004–2005	Southampton	27	(12)
2005–2008	Liverpool	85	(22)
2008–2009	Portsmouth	38	(11)
2009–2011	Tottenham Hotspur	73	(12)
2011–2019	Stoke City	225	(46)
2019	Burnley	6	(0)
Total		599	(145)

International career
2002–2003	England U21	6	(1)
2006	England B	1	(0)
2005–2010	England	42	(22)
- * Club domestic league appearances and goals

Peter James Crouch (born 30 January 1981) is an English television personality and former professional footballer who played as a striker. He was capped 42 times by the England national team between 2005 and 2010, scoring 22 goals for his country during that time, appearing at two FIFA World Cups. He is one of 35 players to have scored 100 or more Premier League goals, and holds the record for the most headed goals in Premier League history. A tall forward, with a slender physique, Crouch was known for his aerial abilities, technical abilities and hold-up play.

Crouch began his career as a trainee with Tottenham Hotspur. He failed to make an appearance for Spurs and after loan spells at Dulwich Hamlet and Swedish club IFK Hässleholm he joined Queens Park Rangers. After QPR were relegated at the end of the 2000–01 season, Portsmouth acquired him in a transfer deal worth £1.5 million. He had a strong first season at Fratton Park, and after scoring 19 goals for the club, he joined Aston Villa in March 2002 for £5 million. He had a relatively poor spell at Villa, however, and was loaned out to Norwich City in 2003 before making a move to Southampton, where he regained his form, which would ultimately prompt his joining Liverpool in July 2005. At Liverpool he enjoyed considerable success, winning the FA Cup and FA Community Shield in 2006, and also gaining a runners-up medal in the 2007 UEFA Champions League final.

After scoring 42 goals in three seasons at Anfield, Portsmouth re-acquired Crouch for £11 million, where he forged an effective partnership with fellow England international Jermain Defoe. He spent just one season in his second spell at Portsmouth and left for Tottenham Hotspur, where he again linked up with Defoe and Harry Redknapp. He scored a vital goal for Tottenham against Manchester City which earned the club a place in the UEFA Champions League. He scored seven goals in ten European matches for Spurs in 2010–11, but was unable to replicate this form in the Premier League. He joined Stoke City in August 2011, for a club record fee of £10 million. In his first season with Stoke, he scored 14 goals and won the club's Player of the Year award. He scored eight in 2012–13 and ten in both the 2013–14 and 2014–15 seasons. Crouch spent seven and a half years with Stoke, scoring 62 goals before joining Burnley in January 2019. He retired in July 2019 after the end of his contract.

== Early life ==
Crouch was born in Macclesfield, Cheshire, but his family moved to Singapore when he was one year old. The move came about when his father Bruce, originally from Fulham, took up a job offer to work at a Singaporean advertising agency. The Crouch family spent three years living in Southeast Asia, and moved back to England after Bruce rejected the chance to work in Australia. They then spent time living at a YMCA in Tottenham before settling in Harrow on the Hill. Crouch attended Roxeth Primary and North Ealing Primary and began to play football with Northolt Hotspurs. He was then invited to join the Brentford Centre of Excellence in 1991 and he also played for the boys club West Middlesex Colts whilst attending Drayton Manor High School. Crouch turned down contract offers from Chelsea and Millwall and instead joined Queens Park Rangers in the summer of 1994. He did not stay at QPR for long, however, for in November 1994, the coaching staff at Loftus Road moved to Tottenham Hotspur, including its youth team manager Des Bulpin, who offered Crouch a contract at Spurs.

Crouch's family were Chelsea supporters, with Peter being named after legendary Chelsea forward Peter Osgood, and he became a ball boy at Stamford Bridge at the age of ten. As a child, he attended some Chelsea matches. Later, he told the Liverpool official website that despite this, he and his friends at the time were fans of QPR.

== Club career ==
=== Tottenham Hotspur ===
Crouch signed a professional contract with Tottenham Hotspur on 2 July 1998, after having played for their youth team. However, he did not make any appearances for their first team and was loaned out to other clubs, having brief spells at Dulwich Hamlet in the Isthmian League Premier Division and, in the summer of 2000, IFK Hässleholm in Sweden, where he played in the country's third tier. His move to Sweden came about when IFK Hässleholm sold Jon Jönsson to Tottenham for £70,000 and also agreed two loan deals for the Swedish club, that of Crouch and Alton Thelwell.

=== QPR and Portsmouth ===
On 28 July 2000, Tottenham sold Crouch to First Division club Queens Park Rangers for £60,000. He made an immediate impression with QPR, scoring ten league goals in the 2000–01 season, but it was not enough to prevent the team's relegation to the Second Division.

Relegation meant that QPR had to sell many of their best players to support their diminished finances, and Portsmouth bought Crouch for £1.5 million. Crouch scored 18 league goals in 37 starts for Portsmouth during the 2001–02 season and was tipped by manager Graham Rix to have a big future in the game.

=== Aston Villa ===
In March 2002, Premier League club Aston Villa made a successful £5 million bid for Crouch. He scored on his home debut for Villa, the equalising goal against Newcastle United, and went on to score twice in seven appearances. Crouch, however, failed to hold down a regular place in the Aston Villa team in the following 2002–03 season making 18 appearances without scoring. Looking for first team football, he was loaned to Norwich City from September to December 2003. Crouch played 15 times for the Canaries in 2003–04, scoring four goals helping the team gain promotion. Crouch was sent off for retaliation during Norwich's 3–1 win at Walsall, but nonetheless his spell at Norwich renewed interest in his abilities from other clubs.

At the end of the three-month loan, he returned to Aston Villa, and scored a brace against Leicester City, a late winner at Middlesbrough and the opener at Bolton Wanderers.

=== Southampton ===
Villa sold Crouch in July 2004 to Southampton for a fee of £2 million, on a four-year contract. Despite initially being back-up to first choice strikers James Beattie and Kevin Phillips, Crouch became the main attacking focus of the Southampton team upon the arrival of Harry Redknapp and the sale of Beattie. He scored many key goals in Southampton's relegation battle, including against Liverpool in a 2–0 home win, Arsenal in a 1–1 home draw and two away to Middlesbrough in a 3–1 victory. He also scored a late winning penalty to knock former club and Saints' arch-rival Portsmouth out of the FA Cup. On 7 May 2005, he was sent off in the penultimate game of the season, a 2–2 draw away to relegation rivals Crystal Palace, for a confrontation with Gonzalo Sorondo that triggered a mass brawl. The Football Association upheld his three-game suspension, meaning that Southampton would have to defeat Manchester United in the last game of the season without him.

After scoring 16 goals in 33 appearances during the 2004–05 season, Crouch's future was cast into doubt when Southampton were relegated from the Premier League. His form for the Saints resulted in him receiving his first England call-up.

=== Liverpool ===
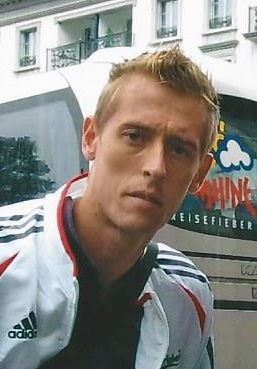
Crouch with Liverpool in 2006

On 19 July 2005, Southampton agreed to sell Crouch for £7 million to Liverpool on a four-year contract. Crouch underwent intense media scrutiny because of a goal drought during his first months at Liverpool. For 19 matches—the span of four months—he was unable to score. Crouch was praised for other facets of his game, such as his touch on the ball, but his first goal for the club evaded him. The fact that Crouch possessed "good touch for a big man" became something of a media cliché during this time. Early in his Liverpool career, the supporters composed a new chant: "He's big, he's red, his feet stick out the bed, Peter Crouch, Peter Crouch."

The drought finally ended on 3 December 2005 when he scored against Wigan Athletic. Although this first goal was originally given as an own goal, it was later awarded to Crouch on appeal; he went on to score a second goal in the same match. Before these goals, Crouch had played over 24 hours of football for Liverpool without scoring. In addition to this, he also had to deal with unpleasant taunts from crowds at matches, as he had throughout his footballing career, who often chanted "freak" at him due to his unusual height. He went on to score several goals that season, including the only goal in the fifth round of the FA Cup against Manchester United, Liverpool's first victory over them in the FA Cup post-Second World War. On 13 May, he helped Liverpool to win the 2006 FA Cup Final against West Ham United, providing an assist for Steven Gerrard to score the second Liverpool goal.

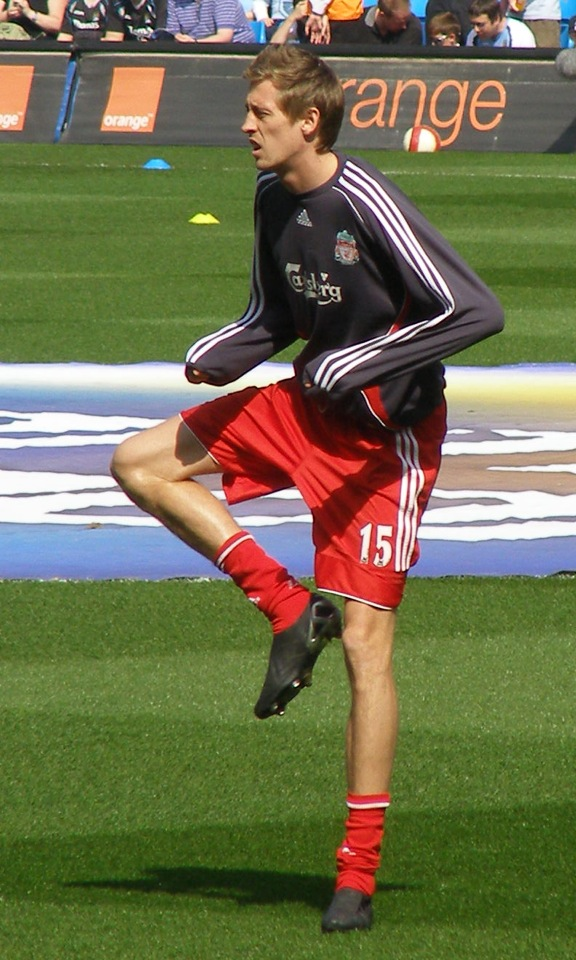
Crouch warming up for Liverpool in 2007

Three months later, in the curtain-raiser to the 2006–07 season, he headed the winning goal for Liverpool in the club's 2–1 victory over Chelsea in the FA Community Shield. In their 2006–07 UEFA Champions League campaign, he scored his first goals in European club competition against Maccabi Haifa. Crouch sustained a broken nose when playing against Sheffield United in February 2007. Although he played in some subsequent matches, on 9 March 2007, it was announced that he would undergo surgery on the injury that would keep him out of football for a month. On 31 March, he returned to action after the operation and scored the first hat-trick of his club career, coming against Arsenal in a 4–1 victory. This was also a so-called "perfect hat-trick," consisting of goals scored from his right foot, left foot and head. He later participated in the 2007 UEFA Champions League Final, coming on as a substitute for Javier Mascherano as Liverpool were defeated by Milan in Athens. He ended the 2006–07 season as Liverpool's top goalscorer in all competitions, with eighteen goals.

At the start of the 2007–08 season, he had restricted opportunities to play for Liverpool due to the arrival of other strikers, including Fernando Torres, but nonetheless scored against Toulouse in a Champions League qualifying win in August, his eighth goal in his past ten appearances in that competition, and then also scoring the first and last goals of an 8–0 win over Beşiktaş in the first round of the Champions League in November. On 19 December, Crouch was sent off in the quarter-finals of the League Cup, receiving a straight red card for a foul on Chelsea's Mikel John Obi as Liverpool exited the tournament. In April, he scored a vital goal in a 1–1 draw against Arsenal, helping Liverpool secure fourth spot ahead of local rivals Everton.

=== Return to Portsmouth ===
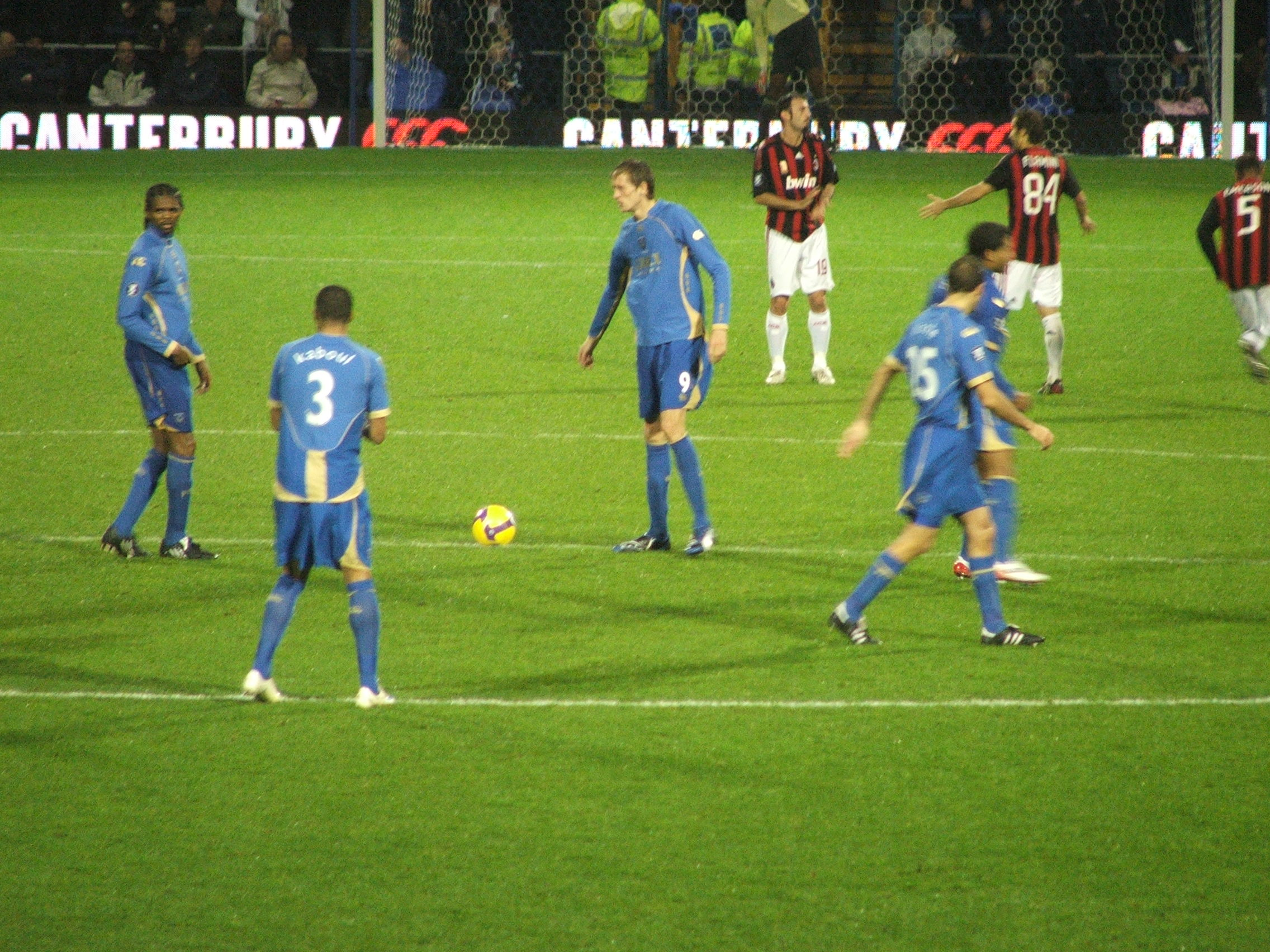
Crouch playing for Portsmouth in 2008

On 7 July 2008, it was announced that Crouch had verbally agreed to join former club and FA Cup holders Portsmouth in a deal worth up to £11 million. Crouch passed his medical the following day, and, on 11 July, Crouch's transfer was officially unveiled at a Portsmouth news conference. Crouch scored his first goal on his return to Portsmouth in a 3–0 win against Everton at Goodison Park on 30 August 2008. Crouch then went on to net his first goal at Portsmouth's Fratton Park home ground in the Premier League against Tottenham Hotspur on 28 September. On 2 October 2008, Crouch scored twice in extra time in a UEFA Cup match away to Portuguese team Vitória de Guimarães to help Portsmouth reach the group stages of the competition. He went on to score twice against Heerenveen in a 3–0 victory at Fratton Park, however Portsmouth failed to make it out of the group stages. Crouch played 46 times for Pompey in 2008–09, scoring 16 goals as the side finished in 14th position.

=== Return to Tottenham Hotspur ===
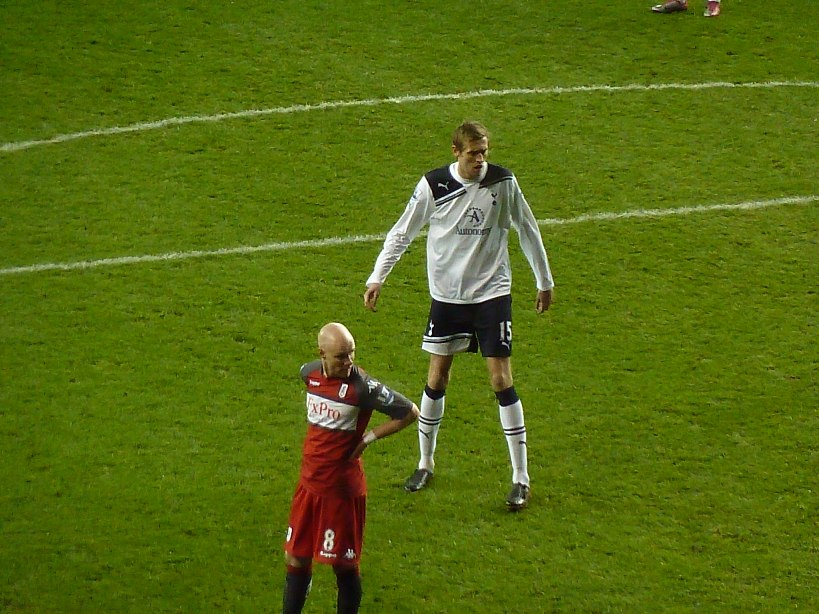
Crouch playing for Tottenham Hotspur in 2011

On 27 July 2009, Tottenham Hotspur signed Crouch from Portsmouth for a fee of £10 million, on a five-year contract. Crouch made his debut for Spurs in a pre-season friendly against Olympiacos, and came on as a substitute in Tottenham's season opening win over Liverpool, making his full Premier League debut for the club in the process. He scored his first goal for Tottenham in the League Cup tie against Doncaster Rovers in a 5–1 win on 26 August 2009. He scored again in his next match, opening his league account with Spurs with a goal in a 2–1 home win against Birmingham City. On 23 September, Crouch scored his first hat-trick for Spurs in a 5–1 win over Preston North End in the League Cup. In May, his late goal against Manchester City in what was being dubbed as the "£15 million game" put Spurs in a position to claim their first-ever Champions League berth. After having hit the post and missed a Benoît Assou-Ekotto cross, Crouch scored a header after goalkeeper Márton Fülöp could only parry the ball into his path.

On 25 August 2010, Crouch scored a hat-trick at White Hart Lane against Young Boys to help Tottenham to reach the group stage of the 2010–11 Champions League. On 15 February 2011, Crouch scored what turned out to be the winning goal in the Champions League second round, first leg match against Milan at the San Siro, sweeping home Aaron Lennon's cut-back after a counter-attack. Three weeks later, Spurs progressed to the quarter-finals after the reverse fixture at White Hart Lane ended 0–0. On 5 April, he was sent off in the 14th minute after receiving two yellow cards in the quarter-finals against Real Madrid. He scored an own goal against Manchester City, which consequently confirmed City into the Champions League for the 2011–12 season with Tottenham finishing fifth.

=== Stoke City ===
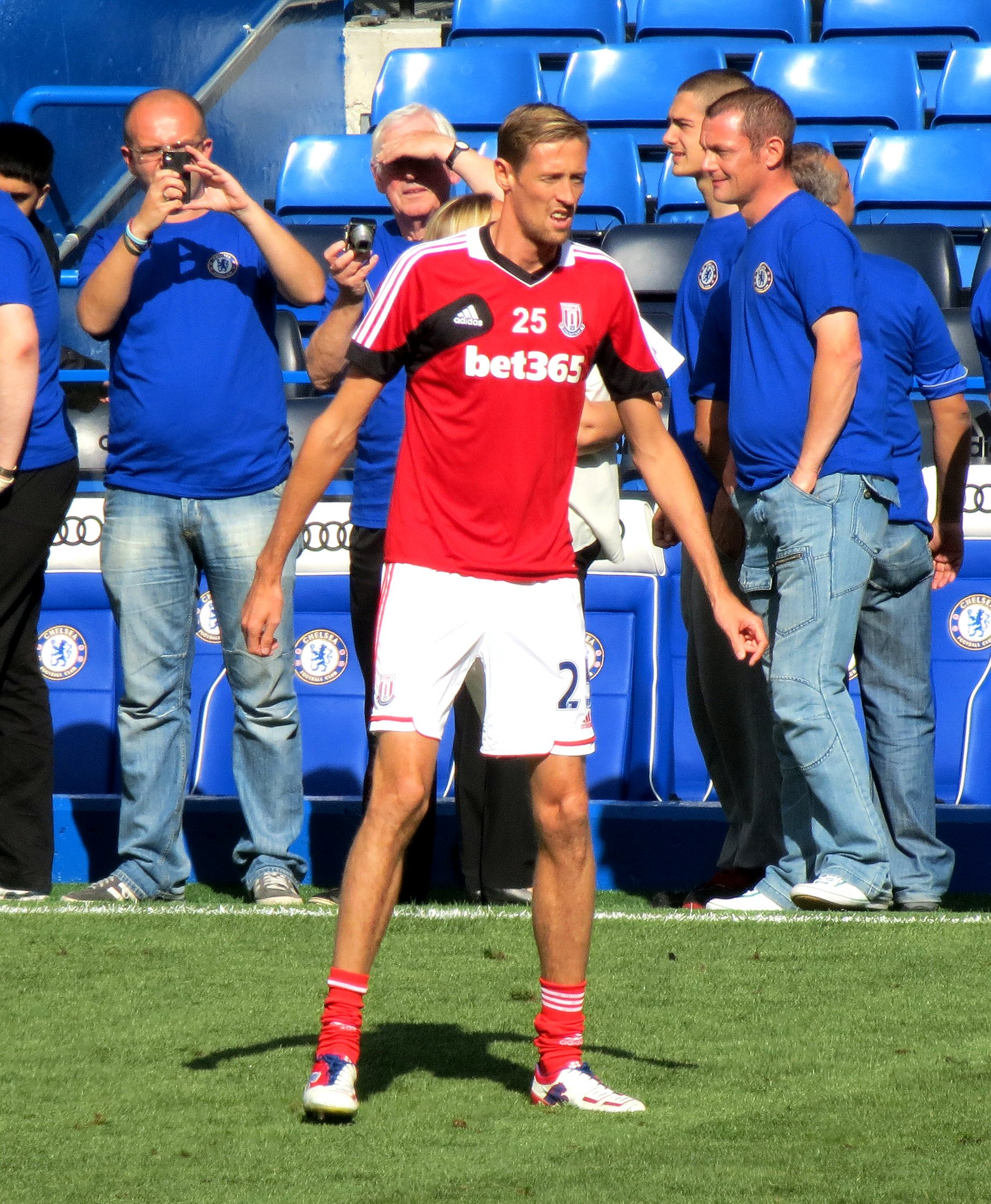
Crouch warming up for Stoke City in 2012

On 31 August 2011, Stoke City signed Crouch from Tottenham for a then club record fee of £10 million, that would rise to £12 million, on a four-year contract. Speaking after sealing his move to the Britannia Stadium, Crouch revealed that his former Tottenham teammate Jonathan Woodgate was a major influence upon his decision to join Stoke. Crouch made his debut for Stoke City in a 1–0 win against former club Liverpool on 10 September 2011. He scored his first goal for the Potters in a 1–1 draw against Manchester United, making Stoke the sixth Premier League club he has scored for. He scored his second goal in the following match against Beşiktaş in the 2011–12 UEFA Europa League campaign. Crouch went on to score against Arsenal, Maccabi Tel Aviv, Blackburn Rovers and Wolverhampton Wanderers before missing out on the Christmas period matches after suffering from a virus.

On 2 January 2012, against Blackburn, Crouch scored both goals in a 2–1 victory. It was a landmark achievement for Crouch as he surpassed 100 league goals. On 24 March 2012, Crouch scored a stunning long-distance volley against Manchester City in a 1–1 draw at the Britannia Stadium. After the match, Crouch stated that it was the best goal of his career. He scored the winning goal for Stoke against their Midlands rivals Wolves on 7 April to take his goal tally to 13 and was backed by manager Tony Pulis to earn a recall to the England squad for UEFA Euro 2012. At the end of season awards dinner, Crouch won the club's Player of the Year and Goal of the Season awards.

Crouch began the 2012–13 season well, scoring five goals in seven matches, against Swindon Town, Wigan Athletic, Manchester City and a brace against Swansea City. He lost several teeth after being accidentally kicked in the mouth by Fabricio Coloccini in a match against Newcastle United on 28 November 2012 and as a result had to undergo corrective surgery. He then went three months without a goal before scoring against Wigan on 29 January 2013. Crouch again went through a three-month barren spell in front of goal before scoring against former club Queens Park Rangers on 20 April 2013 in a 2–0 victory. He scored on the final day of the season against Southampton as he ended the 2012–13 season with eight goals, with Stoke finishing 13th in the league.

Mark Hughes replaced Tony Pulis as manager in May 2013 and despite starting the first two matches of the 2013–14 season, Hughes dropped Crouch to the bench. He returned to the starting line up on 26 October 2013 and scored in a 3–2 defeat against Manchester United. Crouch retained his place in the team for the remainder of the 2013–14 season, where he finished as top scorer with ten goals in 38 appearances as Stoke finished in ninth place.

Crouch scored his first goals of 2014–15 in September 2014 against QPR and Newcastle. In October 2014, Crouch stated that he would like to remain at the Britannia Stadium with Stoke for the remainder of his career. On 29 October 2014, Crouch came on as a substitute in Stoke's League Cup defeat to Southampton; 15 minutes later, he was sent off for two yellow cards in the space of two minutes. On 6 December, he scored after 19 seconds against Arsenal in an eventual 3–2 victory. A week later, in his 600th match in English football, Crouch scored the equaliser in a 1–1 draw at Crystal Palace. Crouch signed a two-year contract extension in January 2015.

On 28 February 2015, Crouch scored the winning goal in Stoke's 1–0 win over Hull City, equaling Alan Shearer's record of 46 headed goals in the Premier League. He surpassed this on 24 May with a header five minutes after coming on as a substitute to conclude a 6–1 home win over Liverpool in Stoke's final match of the season. In total, Crouch matched the previous season's goal tally of ten goals in 38 appearances as Stoke finished in ninth position for the second consecutive season. Following the end of the season, Crouch underwent groin surgery. Crouch struggled for game time in 2015–16 making 18 appearances of which nine were as a substitute. He scored just twice, which came against lower league Fulham and Doncaster Rovers in cup competitions.

Crouch scored a hat-trick away to Stevenage in the EFL Cup, on 23 August 2016 in a 4–0 win. On 9 January 2017, Crouch signed a new contract with Stoke in a deal lasting until the summer of 2018. Crouch scored four goals in five games at the turn of the year including his 100th Premier League goal, the oldest player to hit the landmark. Crouch made 29 appearances in 2016–17, scoring ten goals, as Stoke finished in 13th position. After the season ended Crouch stated that he wants to continue playing until he is 40.

Crouch set a record for the most appearances as substitute in the Premier League, on 20 November 2017 when he came off the bench for the 143rd time against Brighton & Hove Albion, breaking the record held by Shola Ameobi. He also became Stoke City's leading Premier League goalscorer of all time during the same season, reaching 45 goals and overtaking the 43 scored by Jonathan Walters. Crouch signed another one-year contract extension with the Potters in November 2017. Crouch played 34 times in 2017–18, scoring six goals as Stoke were relegated to the Championship.

=== Burnley ===
Crouch signed for Premier League club Burnley on 31 January 2019 on a contract until the end of the 2018–19 season in a player-exchange deal with Sam Vokes. Crouch made his debut for Burnley on 2 February, coming on as a 76th minute substitute in a 1–1 draw against Southampton; he made an immediate impact, as he was instrumental in Burnley being awarded their first penalty for a season-and-a-half. He was released at the end of the season and announced his retirement from professional football on 12 July 2019 at the age of 38.

== International career ==
=== Youth international ===
Crouch was capped for the England under-20 team at the 1999 FIFA World Youth Championship, with teammates including Stuart Taylor, Ashley Cole, Andrew Johnson and Matthew Etherington. However, the team finished bottom at the group stage, with three losses and having scored no goals. He was later a part of David Platt's England under-21 team, which went to the finals of the European Under-21 Championship in Switzerland in May 2002, where he scored once against Switzerland.

=== Breakthrough into senior team ===
In May 2005 he was handed his first call-up to the England senior squad by manager Sven-Göran Eriksson for the team's tour of the United States, making his debut against Colombia. He went on to make two appearances during the 2006 FIFA World Cup qualifying campaign for England: starting against Austria in a 1–0 victory and coming on as a substitute against Poland in a 2–1 win. In the latter appearance, Crouch's introduction as a second-half substitute was booed by England's own supporters. On 1 March 2006, he scored his first goal for England, with the equaliser in a 2–1 friendly win over Uruguay. He did this whilst bizarrely wearing two different squad numbers on his shirt – No. 21 on the front (his designated squad number for the match), and the incorrect No. 12 on the back.

In May 2006, Crouch was included in the 23-man England squad for the 2006 FIFA World Cup, and was expected to be a significant figure in the team due to Wayne Rooney's foot injury. On 30 May, he played in a pre-World Cup friendly against Hungary, scoring the third goal in England's 3–1 win. He followed his goal with his iconic robotic dancing goal celebration. On 3 June, he scored a hat-trick in a 6–0 pre-World Cup friendly victory against Jamaica where he again performed his robotic celebration.

=== 2006 World Cup ===
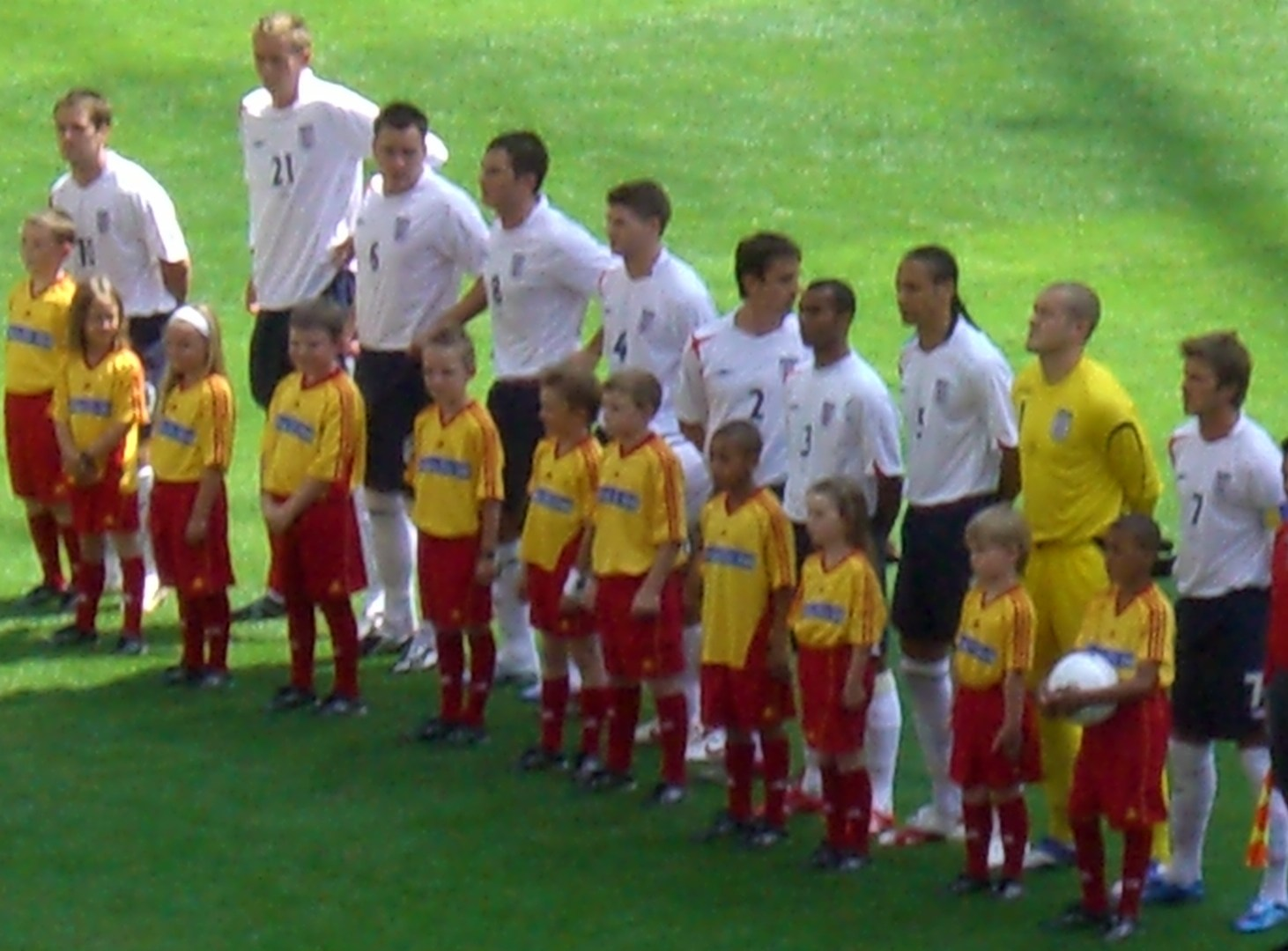
Crouch (wearing No.21) lining up for England against Paraguay at the 2006 FIFA World Cup

After his displays in England's friendlies, Crouch partnered with Michael Owen in attack for England's opening 2006 World Cup match against Paraguay on 10 June 2006. England won the match 1–0 and Crouch kept his place in the starting line-up for the following match against Trinidad and Tobago, against whom he scored his first competitive international goal. The goal provoked some controversy as replays showed Crouch to be pulling on Brent Sancho's long hair, holding the defender down, to gain an advantage.

Crouch was rested for England's third group match against Sweden as Rooney returned from injury to join the starting line-up. However, Owen suffered a serious knee injury in the opening minute of the match and Crouch replaced him, playing the remainder of the match. In England's 1–0 second round victory against Ecuador, Crouch remained an unused substitute as Eriksson switched the team to a new formation with Wayne Rooney as a lone striker. After Rooney's dismissal for a foul in England's quarter-final against Portugal, Crouch came on as a substitute for Joe Cole, as England went on to get knocked out on penalties. On 5 September 2007, retired English referee Graham Poll claimed that FIFA had specifically warned referees at the event to pay close attention to Crouch, claiming that "he's a real pain and he's getting away with too much."

=== Euro 2008 qualifying ===
Crouch remained a part of the England set-up under Eriksson's successor as manager, Steve McClaren, and started McClaren's first match in charge, a friendly against Greece in August 2006. He scored twice in England's 4–0 victory. Two further goals followed in England's next match, a 5–0 win over Andorra in their opening qualifying match for UEFA Euro 2008 on 2 September 2006. Contemporary reports suggested that Crouch was the first player ever to reach ten goals for England within a single calendar year. In fact, this had happened several times pre-Second World War, most recently by Dixie Dean (12 goals in 1927) and George Camsell (11 goals in 1929). An operation needed for a nose injury he sustained playing for Liverpool prevented him from playing in England's two qualifying matches in March 2007. He returned to the England squad for their matches against Brazil and Estonia in late May and early June 2007, scoring in the qualifying match against the latter. Crouch was England's top scorer in the qualifying campaign with five goals, but this did not prevent England finishing only third in their group and failing to progress to the finals of the competition.

=== Capello era ===
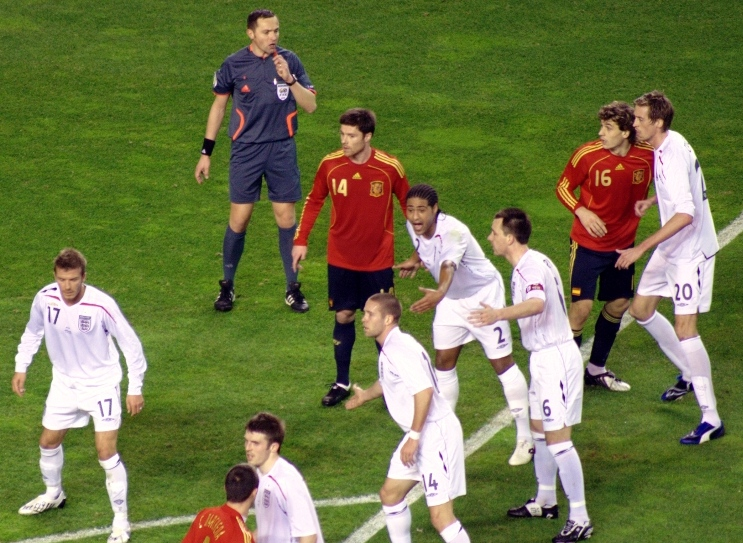
Crouch (wearing No.20) playing for England versus Spain, 2009

On 1 April 2009, Crouch made his first start under McClaren's successor, Fabio Capello, in a 2010 World Cup qualifier against Ukraine. He scored England's first goal in their 2–1 victory. Crouch was re-called to the England squad for the friendly against Slovenia and the World Cup qualifier versus Croatia, following his fine form for Tottenham. Crouch also got an early first half goal against Belarus in the final 2010 World Cup qualifier, which he then followed up with a second goal in the 76th minute. This took Crouch's tally for England up to 18 goals in just 17 starts. Crouch scored a brace after coming on as a substitute against Egypt in a friendly on 3 March 2010 to take his overall international goal tally to 20. He also scored the second goal for England against Mexico at Wembley Stadium on 24 May 2010.

=== 2010 World Cup ===
Crouch was named in Capello's final 23-man squad for the 2010 World Cup and was given the number 9 shirt. He came on as a substitute for Emile Heskey in England's opening match against the United States and also came off the bench for Gareth Barry in the following match against Algeria. Crouch did not take part in the final group stage match with Slovenia or the 4–1 loss to Germany in the last-16.

=== Post-2010 World Cup ===
Crouch came on as a substitute in the home friendly against France for the injured Steven Gerrard on 17 November 2010. He scored quickly from an Ashley Young corner to make the score 1–2 with an angled side-footed volley. It was his second touch of the ball. After not making an appearance for England for almost a year, Crouch stated in October 2011 that he "does not carry much hope" of receiving a call-up.

Crouch was not part of the England squad for UEFA Euro 2012. After the tournament it was reported that Crouch refused to be in it unless he was part of the original squad, according to manager Roy Hodgson, which drew criticism directed at him. However, Crouch afterwards said that this was not the case and that he would "never" not want to play for England.

During a run of good form in September 2017, Crouch said in a television interview that he was not officially retired from international football.

== Player profile ==
=== Style of play ===
A tall forward, with a slender physique, Crouch was known for possessing a good first touch, as well as an eye for goal; however, he was also known for his lack of significant pace, strength, power, and athleticism, while his movement occasionally came under criticism in the media. He usually played as a target man in a centre-forward role throughout his career, or as a striker, due to his ability to hold up the ball with his back to goal and link-up with his teammates. Although he was criticised in his youth for his limited ability in the air, despite his height, and for his inability to out–jump other players, he holds the record for the most headed goals in Premier League history. He was also known for his longevity, and had a penchant for scoring acrobatic goals from bicycle kicks. Crouch has attributed his success as a footballer to his own hard work and determination.

=== Personality as a footballer ===
==== Nicknames ====
Although generally known as "Crouchy," other nicknames he has been given by fans and the media in England have included "RoboCrouch" and "Crouchinho" (an ironic use of the "-inho" suffix, meaning "little" in Portuguese and used by many Brazilian footballers). He has been also referred to as "Mr. Roboto" by Univision's commentators and as "Pantera Rosa" ("Pink Panther") by Fox Sports en Español commentators.

==== Robotic dancing ====
In the summer of 2006, Crouch adopted a robotic dancing goal celebration. A parody of a dance he had been seen performing on a television programme covering a party held at England teammate David Beckham's house, he first performed it after his goal for England against Hungary on 30 May. He again performed the dance after both of his first two goals against Jamaica on 3 June. The Daily Mirror newspaper wrote that the dance was inspired by the lyrics to the Arctic Monkeys' hit single "I Bet You Look Good on the Dancefloor".

On 12 June, Crouch announced he would perform his robotic dance again only if England were to win the World Cup, saying, "It's not about robotic dancing. It is about scoring goals and winning matches. It's an important time for everyone now." In September 2006, he was quoted in The Observer newspaper as saying that, "It was funny at the time, but I didn't want to carry on doing it until it became unfunny. I've stopped doing it for the time being, but if I ever score a really big goal you never know."

On 6 August 2007, Crouch said he would never use the robot dance again unless he scored in the UEFA Champions League Final, but he partially reprised it on 1 April 2009 after scoring during England's World Cup qualifier against Ukraine after a Comic Relief sketch.

On 1 February 2017, Crouch gave the dance a final outing to celebrate his 100th Premier League goal.

== Non-playing career ==
After retiring from football in 2019 at the age of 38, Crouch has worked on a Saturday night BBC One TV show titled Peter Crouch: Save Our Summer. In 2022, he became a member of the panel for the TV series The Masked Dancer.

Crouch released his autobiography in 2007, titled Walking Tall – My Story. His second book, How to be a Footballer, was released in 2018, and the follow-up, I, Robot, was released in 2019. In autumn 2018, the first series of That Peter Crouch Podcast aired, featuring Crouch along with Tom Fordyce and Chris Stark.

Crouch has a GNVQ in Leisure and Tourism, which he obtained as part of a mandatory educational programme while at Tottenham Hotspur.

== Personal life ==
Crouch met model Abbey Clancy in December 2005, in a nightclub where Clancy worked. The couple married on 30 June 2011, shortly after the birth of their first child. They have two daughters and two sons, Sophia Ruby (born March 2011), Liberty Rose (born June 2015), Johnny (born January 2018) and Jack (born June 2019).

In August 2012, Crouch pleaded guilty to a speeding offence from November 2011, and was ordered to pay a fine plus costs of £1,365. In September 2012, Crouch was disqualified from driving for six months and also incurred 12 penalty points. He was additionally ordered to pay fines and costs totalling £1,585 for failing to identify the driver of his vehicle on two separate occasions.

== Career statistics ==
=== Club ===
Appearances and goals by club, season and competition
Club	Season	League			FA Cup		League Cup		Europe		Other		Total	
Club	Season	Division	Apps	Goals	Apps	Goals	Apps	Goals	Apps	Goals	Apps	Goals	Apps	Goals
Tottenham Hotspur	1999–2000	Premier League	0	0	0	0	0	0	0	0	—		0	0
Dulwich Hamlet (loan)	1999–2000	Isthmian League Premier Division	6	1	—		—		—		—		6	1
IFK Hässleholm (loan)	2000	Swedish Division 2	8	3	—		—		—		—		8	3
Queens Park Rangers	2000–01	First Division	42	10	3	2	2	0	—		—		47	12
Portsmouth	2001–02	First Division	37	18	1	0	1	1	—		—		39	19
Aston Villa	2001–02	Premier League	7	2	—		—		—		—		7	2
Aston Villa	2002–03	Premier League	14	0	0	0	0	0	4 (Note: Appearances in UEFA Intertoto Cup)	0	—		18	0
Aston Villa	2003–04	Premier League	16	4	0	0	2	0	—		—		18	4
Aston Villa	Total		37	6	0	0	2	0	4	0	—		43	6
Norwich City (loan)	2003–04	First Division	15	4	—		—		—		—		15	4
Southampton	2004–05	Premier League	27	12	5	4	1	0	—		—		33	16
Liverpool	2005–06	Premier League	32	8	6	3	1	0	8 (Note: Appearances in UEFA Champions League)	0	2 (Note: Appearances in FIFA Club World Championship)	2	49	13
Liverpool	2006–07	Premier League	32	9	1	0	1	1	14	7	1 (Note: Appearance in FA Community Shield)	1	49	18
Liverpool	2007–08	Premier League	21	5	4	2	3	0	8	4	—		36	11
Liverpool	Total		85	22	11	5	5	1	30	11	3	3	134	42
Portsmouth	2008–09	Premier League	38	11	3	1	1	0	6 (Note: Appearances in UEFA Cup)	4	1	0	49	16
Tottenham Hotspur	2009–10	Premier League	38	8	6	1	3	4	—		—		47	13
Tottenham Hotspur	2010–11	Premier League	34	4	1	0	0	0	10	7	—		45	11
Tottenham Hotspur	2011–12	Premier League	1	0	—		—		0	0	—		1	0
Tottenham Hotspur	Total		73	12	7	1	3	4	10	7	0	0	93	24
Stoke City	2011–12	Premier League	32	10	3	2	2	0	3 (Note: Appearances in UEFA Europa League)	2	—		40	14
Stoke City	2012–13	Premier League	34	7	3	0	1	1	—		—		38	8
Stoke City	2013–14	Premier League	34	8	1	0	3	2	—		—		38	10
Stoke City	2014–15	Premier League	33	8	2	1	3	1	—		—		38	10
Stoke City	2015–16	Premier League	11	0	2	1	5	1	—		—		18	2
Stoke City	2016–17	Premier League	27	7	1	0	1	3	—		—		29	10
Stoke City	2017–18	Premier League	31	5	1	0	2	1	—		—		34	6
Stoke City	2018–19	Championship	23	1	2	1	1	0	—		—		26	2
Stoke City	Total		225	46	15	5	18	9	3	2	—		261	62
Stoke City U23	2016–17	—	—		—		—		—		1 (Note: Appearance in EFL Trophy)	0	1	0
Burnley	2018–19	Premier League	6	0	—		—		—		—		6	0
Career total			599	145	45	18	33	15	53	24	5	3	735	205

=== International ===
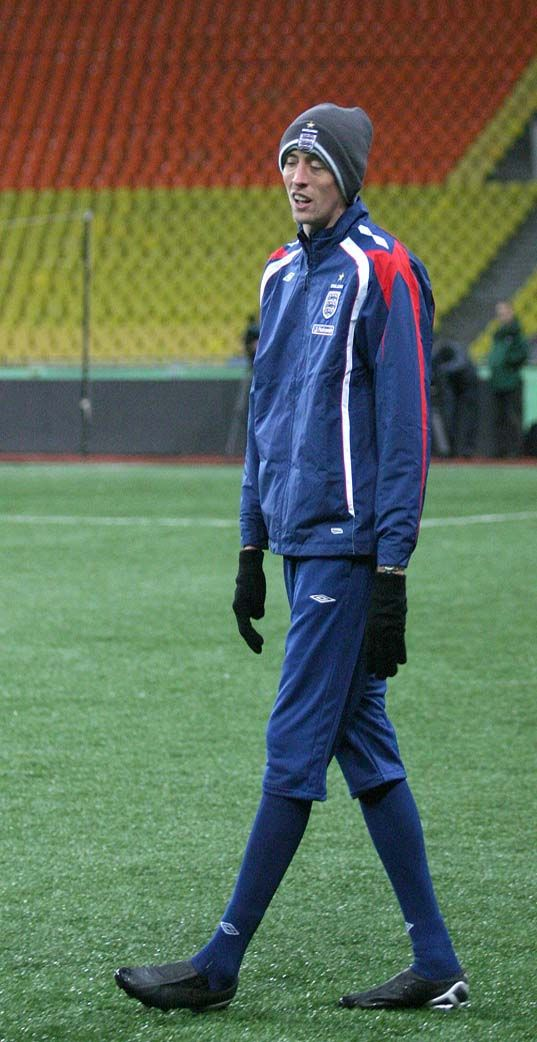
Crouch training with England in 2007

Appearances and goals by national team and year
National team	Year	Apps	Goals
England	2005	4	0
England	2006	12	11
England	2007	8	3
England	2008	6	0
England	2009	6	4
England	2010	6	4
Total		42	22

England score listed first, score column indicates score after each Crouch goal.

International goals by date, venue, cap, opponent, score, result and competition
No.	Date	Venue	Cap	Opponent	Score	Result	Competition	Ref.
1	1 March 2006	Anfield, Liverpool, England	5	Uruguay	1–1	2–1	Friendly	
2	30 May 2006	Old Trafford, Manchester, England	6	Hungary	3–1	3–1	Friendly	
3	3 June 2006	Old Trafford, Manchester, England	7	Jamaica	3–0	6–0	Friendly	
4	3 June 2006	Old Trafford, Manchester, England	7	Jamaica	5–0	6–0	Friendly	
5	3 June 2006	Old Trafford, Manchester, England	7	Jamaica	6–0	6–0	Friendly	
6	15 June 2006	Frankenstadion, Nuremberg, Germany	9	Trinidad and Tobago	1–0	2–0	2006 FIFA World Cup	
7	16 August 2006	Old Trafford, Manchester, England	12	Greece	3–0	4–0	Friendly	
8	16 August 2006	Old Trafford, Manchester, England	12	Greece	4–0	4–0	Friendly	
9	2 September 2006	Old Trafford, Manchester, England	13	Andorra	1–0	5–0	UEFA Euro 2008 qualification	
10	2 September 2006	Old Trafford, Manchester, England	13	Andorra	5–0	5–0	UEFA Euro 2008 qualification	
11	6 September 2006	Philip II Arena, Skopje, Macedonia	14	Macedonia	1–0	1–0	UEFA Euro 2008 qualification	
12	6 June 2007	A. Le Coq Arena, Tallinn, Estonia	19	Estonia	2–0	3–0	UEFA Euro 2008 qualification	
13	16 November 2007	Ernst-Happel-Stadion, Vienna, Austria	23	Austria	1–0	1–0	Friendly	
14	21 November 2007	Wembley Stadium, London, England	24	Croatia	2–2	2–3	UEFA Euro 2008 qualification	
15	1 April 2009	Wembley Stadium, London, England	33	Ukraine	1–0	2–1	2010 FIFA World Cup qualification	
16	10 June 2009	Wembley Stadium, London, England	34	Andorra	6–0	6–0	2010 FIFA World Cup qualification	
17	14 October 2009	Wembley Stadium, London, England	35	Belarus	1–0	3–0	2010 FIFA World Cup qualification	
18	14 October 2009	Wembley Stadium, London, England	35	Belarus	3–0	3–0	2010 FIFA World Cup qualification	
19	3 March 2010	Wembley Stadium, London, England	37	Egypt	1–1	3–1	Friendly	
20	3 March 2010	Wembley Stadium, London, England	37	Egypt	3–1	3–1	Friendly	
21	24 May 2010	Wembley Stadium, London, England	38	Mexico	2–0	3–1	Friendly	
22	17 November 2010	Wembley Stadium, London, England	42	France	1–2	1–2	Friendly	

== Honours ==
Norwich City

- Football League First Division: 2003–04

Liverpool

- FA Cup: 2005–06
- FA Community Shield: 2006
- UEFA Champions League runner-up: 2006–07
- FIFA Club World Championship runner-up: 2005

Individual

- Queens Park Rangers Player of the Season: 2000–01
- Portsmouth Player of the Season: 2001–02
- Stoke City Player of the Year: 2011–12
- Stoke City Goal of the Season: 2011–12
