= Harald Wapenaar =

Dutch footballer

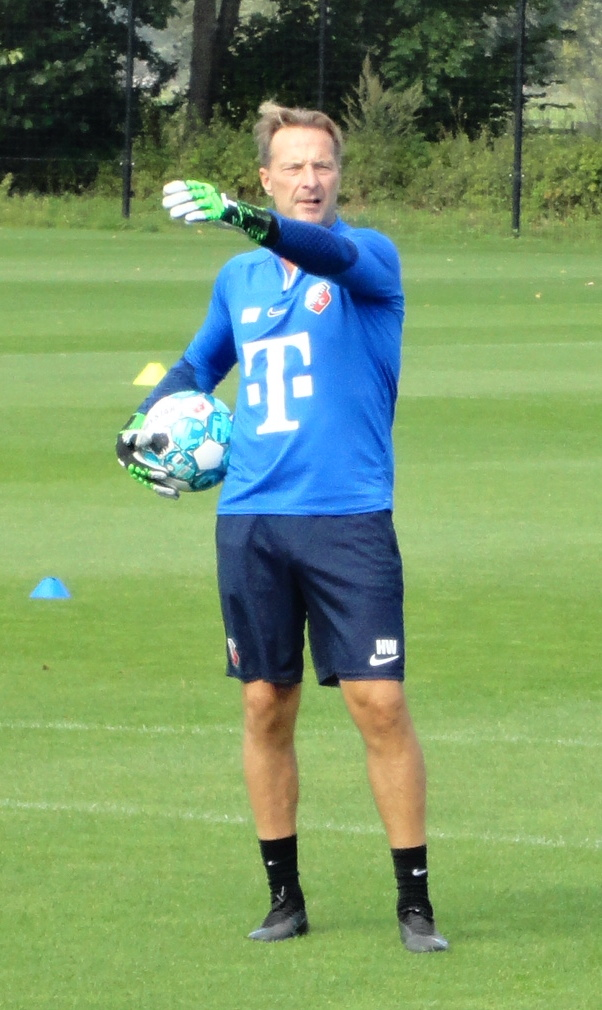
- Wapenaar in 2022

Personal information
- Full name: Harald Paul Wapenaar
- Date of birth: 10 April 1970 (age 56)
- Place of birth: Vlaardingen, Netherlands
- Height: 1.86 m (6 ft 1 in)
- Position: Goalkeeper

Youth career
- Excelsior
- Feyenoord

Senior career*
Years	Team	Apps	(Gls)
1990–1993	Feyenoord	0	(0)
1993–1994	RBC	4	(0)
1994–1997	Helmond Sport	81	(0)
1997–1998	Utrecht	21	(0)
1998–1999	Udinese	2	(0)
1999–2003	Utrecht	130	(0)
2003–2005	Portsmouth	5	(0)
2005–2007	Vitesse	69	(0)
2007	→ Sparta Rotterdam (loan)	14	(0)
2007–2009	Sparta Rotterdam	15	(0)
Total		341	(0)
- * Club domestic league appearances and goals

Harald Wapenaar (born 10 April 1970) is a Dutch former professional footballer who played as a goalkeeper. As well as playing in his native Netherlands, he also played league football in Italy and England.

== Career ==
Wapenaar played for Italian club Udinese and FC Utrecht before transferring to Portsmouth in the summer of 2003. Portsmouth signed Wapenaar as competition for first-choice goalkeeper Shaka Hislop. However, Hislop's superb form and the emergence of young goalkeeper Jamie Ashdown meant Wapenaar struggled for games prior to his move back to the Netherlands, to Vitesse Arnhem in January 2005. After losing his place in 2006–07, he signed for Sparta Rotterdam on loan in 2007, starting in their Eredivisie match against Excelsior Rotterdam on 21 January .

Between 2010 and 2015, Wapenaar worked as goalkeepers coach for FC Volendam. He held the same position during the 2015–16 season at Lierse. He was appointed goalkeepers coach at Willem II in July 2016. On 6 January 2022, Wapenaar left the Tilburg club with immediate effect because of 'insurmountable difference of opinion about vision and working method'.

== Career statistics ==
Club performance			League		Cup		League Cup		Continental		Total	
Season	Club	League	Apps	Goals	Apps	Goals	Apps	Goals	Apps	Goals	Apps	Goals
Netherlands			League		KNVB Cup		League Cup		Europe		Total	
1990–91	Feyenoord	Eredivisie	0	0								
1991–92	Feyenoord	Eredivisie	0	0								
1992–93	Feyenoord	Eredivisie	0	0								
1993–94	RBC Roosendaal		4	0								
1994–95	Helmond Sport	Eerste Divisie	20	0								
1995–96	Helmond Sport	Eerste Divisie	33	0								
1996–97	Helmond Sport	Eerste Divisie	28	0								
1997–98	Utrecht	Eredivisie	21	0								
Italy			League		Coppa Italia		League Cup		Europe		Total	
1998–99	Udinese	Serie A	2	0								
Netherlands			League		KNVB Cup		League Cup		Europe		Total	
1999–00	Utrecht	Eredivisie	33	0								
2000–01	Utrecht	Eredivisie	34	0								
2001–02	Utrecht	Eredivisie	33	0								
2002–03	Utrecht	Eredivisie	30	0								
England			League		FA Cup		League Cup		Europe		Total	
2003–04	Portsmouth	Premier League	5	0								
2004–05	Portsmouth	Premier League	0	0								
Netherlands			League		KNVB Cup		League Cup		Europe		Total	
2004–05	Vitesse Arnhem	Eredivisie	17	0								
2005–06	Vitesse Arnhem	Eredivisie	33	0								
2006–07	Vitesse Arnhem	Eredivisie	19	0								
2006–07	Sparta Rotterdam	Eredivisie	14	0								
2007–08	Sparta Rotterdam	Eredivisie	3	0								
2008–09	Sparta Rotterdam	Eredivisie	12	0								
Total	Netherlands		334	0								
Total	Italy		2	0								
Total	England		5	0								
Career total			341	0								

== Honours ==
Utrecht

- KNVB Cup: 2002–03
