= Andy Parton =

English footballer

Personal information
- Date of birth: 29 September 1983 (age 43)
- Place of birth: Doncaster, England
- Position: Midfielder

Senior career*
Years	Team	Apps	(Gls)
2002–2006	Scunthorpe United	20	(0)
2005	→ Stalybridge Celtic (loan)		
2005–2006	→ Scarborough (loan)	4	(0)
- * Club domestic league appearances and goals

Andy Parton (born 29 September 1983) is an English former footballer who played in the Football League for Scunthorpe United.
