= Mark Casey (footballer) =

Scottish footballer

Personal information
- Full name: Mark Charles Casey
- Date of birth: 9 October 1982 (age 44)
- Place of birth: Glasgow, Scotland
- Positions: Defender; midfielder

Senior career*
Years	Team	Apps	(Gls)
1999–2001	Celtic	0	(0)
2001–2005	Portsmouth	0	(0)
2004	→ St Patrick's Athletic (loan)	23	(1)
2005–2008	Ayr United	62	(0)
2008	Glenafton Athletic	2	(0)
2008	Albion Rovers	1	(0)
2009	Clyde	17	(0)
- * Club domestic league appearances and goals as of 17:33, 14 December 2009 (UTC)

Mark Charles Casey (born 9 October 1982) is a Scottish former professional footballer.

== Career ==
Casey began his career with Celtic, appearing for the under-18 and under-21 side before joining Portsmouth in July 2001. Casey failed to make a competitive first team appearance for Pompey, and moved on loan to St Patrick's Athletic in March 2004.

Casey left Portsmouth in May 2005, and returned to Scotland to sign for Ayr United. He spent two and a half years with Ayr, before leaving the club in January 2008 due to work commitments, and signing for junior side Glenafton Athletic.

He returned to the senior game 8 months later, joining Albion Rovers. He was injured on his debut, and left the club a short time after. He spent the next year out of the game, before appearing at Clyde's open trials in July 2009, and earned himself a one-year contract. He left the club after 6 months in December 2009. In January 2010 he signed for Bellshill Athletic.

== Personal life ==
Casey is the son of former Celtic player Jim Casey. In November 2008, Casey appeared in court after driving whilst being three times over the drink limit, despite already being banned from the road. He was jailed for two and a half months.
