= Tom Hutchinson (English footballer) =

English footballer

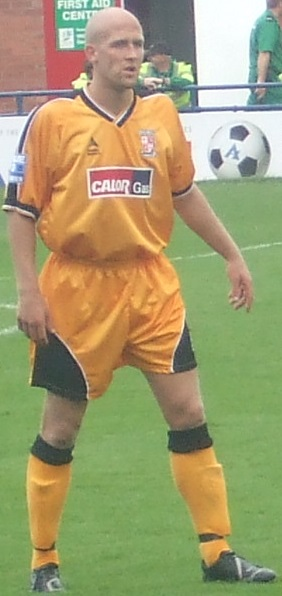
- Hutchinson playing for Woking in 2008

Personal information
- Full name: Thomas Hutchinson
- Date of birth: 23 February 1982 (age 44)
- Place of birth: Kingston upon Thames, England
- Position: Defender

Team information
- Current team: Kingstonian

Senior career*
Years	Team	Apps	(Gls)
?–1998	Sutton United	?	(?)
1998–2002	Fulham	0	(0)
2002–2006	Dundee	34	(1)
2006–2010	Woking	104	(8)
2010–2011	Lewes	?	(?)
2011–	Kingstonian	?	(?)
- * Club domestic league appearances and goals as of 18:33, 14 May 2012 (UTC)

Thomas Hutchinson (born 23 February 1982) is an English footballer who plays for Kingstonian as a defender. He played in the Scottish Premier League for Dundee. He is the identical twin brother of midfielder Eddie Hutchinson.

== Career ==
Born in Kingston upon Thames, London, Hutchinson began his career at non-League Sutton United, then moved to Fulham, but without making any first team appearances left the club and signed for Scottish side Dundee in 2002. He left the club in 2006, having scored once against Aberdeen, and dropped into non-league football back in England when he signed for Woking of the Conference National. Hutchinson signed for Lewes in October 2010 before moving on to the club of his birthplace, Kingstonian, in February 2011.
