= Sebastian Kneißl =

German footballer (born 1983)

Personal information
- Date of birth: 13 January 1983 (age 43)
- Place of birth: Lindenfels, West Germany
- Positions: Midfielder; forward

Youth career
- 1988–1996: KSG Mitlechtern
- 1996–1998: FC 07 Bensheim
- 1998–2000: Eintracht Frankfurt

Senior career*
Years	Team	Apps	(Gls)
2000–2005	Chelsea	0	(0)
2004	→ Dundee (loan)	11	(1)
2004–2005	→ Westerlo (loan)	10	(0)
2005–2007	Wacker Burghausen	33	(4)
2007	Fortuna Düsseldorf	13	(2)
2007	AFC Wimbledon	1	(0)
2007–2008	Wivenhoe Town	1	(0)
2008–2009	SpVgg Weiden	18	(3)
2009–2013	1. FC Schweinfurt 05	94	(16)
2013–2014	SV Heimstetten	13	(3)
Total		194	(29)

International career
2001–2002	Germany U19	12	(3)
2002–2003	Germany U20	11	(3)
- * Club domestic league appearances and goals

Sebastian Kneißl (born 13 January 1983) is a German former professional footballer who played as a midfielder and forward.

== Club career ==
After beginning as a youth player in Germany with KSG Mitlechtern, FC 07 Bensheim and Eintracht Frankfurt, Kneißl signed for English side Chelsea in 2000. He stayed with Chelsea for five years, and although he did not make any league appearances, he spent loan spells in Scotland with Dundee, where he played in 11 league games, scoring one goal, and in Belgium with Westerlo. After leaving Chelsea in 2005 he played for German clubs SV Wacker Burghausen and Fortuna Düsseldorf, before returning to England with AFC Wimbledon in September 2007, where he made one league appearance before leaving in October 2007. He signed for Wivenhoe Town in December 2007, but left after just one league appearance. He next signed for SpVgg Weiden in July 2008, before moving to 1. FC Schweinfurt 05 in January 2009 on another free transfer.

After retiring in October 2013, after playing for SV Heimstetten in the Regionalliga Bayern, Kneißl decided to make a comeback in the tier seven Bezirksliga in 2015–16.

== International career ==
Kneißl represented Germany at the 2002 UEFA European Under-19 Football Championship, in which the Germany U19 finished second, and at the 2003 FIFA World Youth Championship.

== Honours ==
Germany U19

- UEFA European Under-19 Football Championship: Runner-up 2002
