= Gaydamak =

Gaydamak is a surname. Notable people with the surname include:

- Alexandre Gaydamak (born 1976), Russian-French businessman
- Arcadi Gaydamak (born 1952), Russian-Israeli businessman and philanthropist, father of Alexandre

== See also ==
- Haydamak, paramilitary bands in 18th-century Ukraine
