= Arcadi Gaydamak =

Russian-born French-Israeli businessman and philanthropist

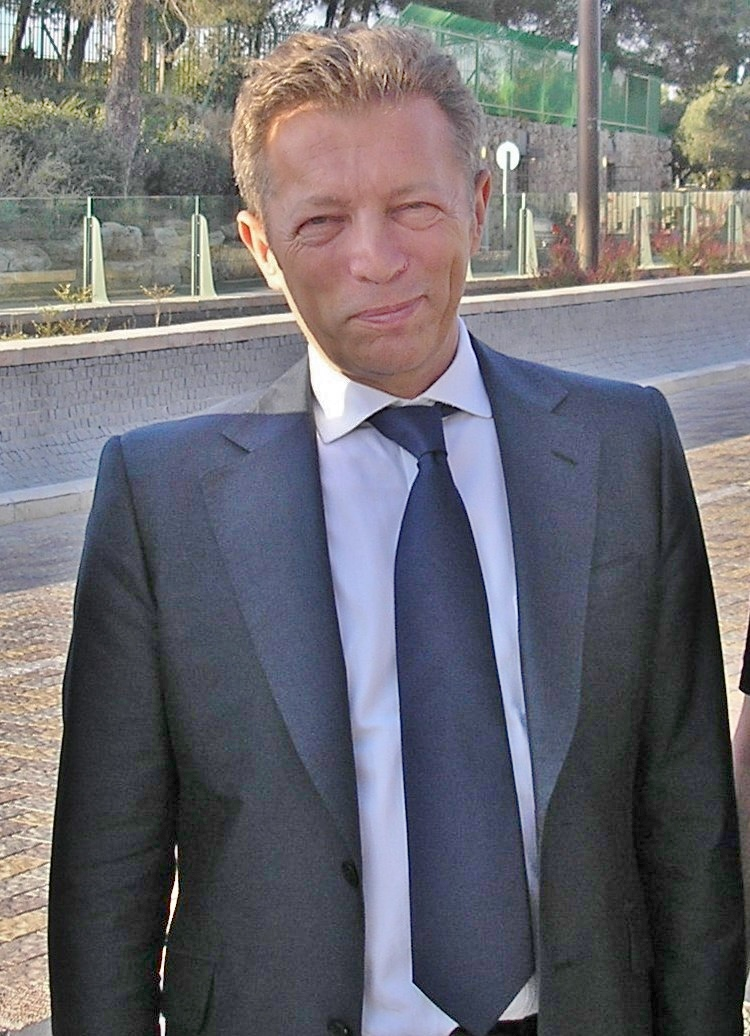
- Born: 8 April 1952 (age 74); Moscow, USSR
- Occupation: businessman
- Spouse: Irene Chirolenikova
- Children: Alexander, Katia and Sonia
- Website: arcadi-gaydamak.com

Arcadi Aleksandrovich Gaydamak (Hebrew: ארקדי אלכסנדרוביץ' גאידמק; Russian: Аркадий Александрович Гайдамак; born 8 April 1952 in Moscow, USSR) is a Russian-born French-Israeli businessman, philanthropist, and President of the Congress of Jewish Religious Communities and Organizations of Russia (KEROOR). In the 1990s he was awarded the French Ordre national du Mérite and the Ordre du Mérite agricole for actions taken to rescue personnel in the War in Bosnia. He holds Israeli, Canadian, French, and Russian nationalities, as well as a diplomatic passport from Angola. Gaydamak's net worth was valued between $700 million and $4 billion USD in 2007.

Gaydamak invested in real estate in France and Israel, in Kazphosphate (the world's largest phosphate producer), in a gold mine and a metal processing plant in Kazakhstan, in the Russian weekly Moskovskiye Novosti, in food distribution in Russia and in oil fields and granaries in Angola. In Israel, his assets included the Bikur Holim hospital in Jerusalem, the Beitar Jerusalem football club, 15% of Africa Israel Holdings, and 99FM radio station. His significant and rapid investments in Israel made him a celebrity in Israel during the mid-2000s, with many mentions in the local media.

== Biography ==
Arcadi Gaydamak was born in Moscow, the capital of the USSR. At the age of 20, he was one of the first Jews to immigrate to Israel from Leonid Brezhnev's Soviet Union and receive Israeli citizenship. He lived on Kibbutz Beit HaShita, and studied Hebrew at an ulpan. He said he originally intended to serve in the Israeli Army, but ended up moving to France, where he opened a translation bureau.

In 1982, Gaydamak Translations opened a branch in Canada. During that period he commenced international business, in import and export. After the collapse of the USSR, he built up ties in Russia and Kazakhstan, and formed various business organizations across Europe.

Gaydamak owns a home in Caesarea, Israel. He is married to Irene Tzirolnicova, with whom he has three children. He speaks Russian, French, and English. He also speaks Portuguese and Hebrew on a basic level.

In December 2008, Gaydamak returned to Russia, settling in Moscow. In February 2009, it was reported that he was seeking to regain his Russian citizenship, lost when he emigrated to Israel decades earlier.

== Political career ==
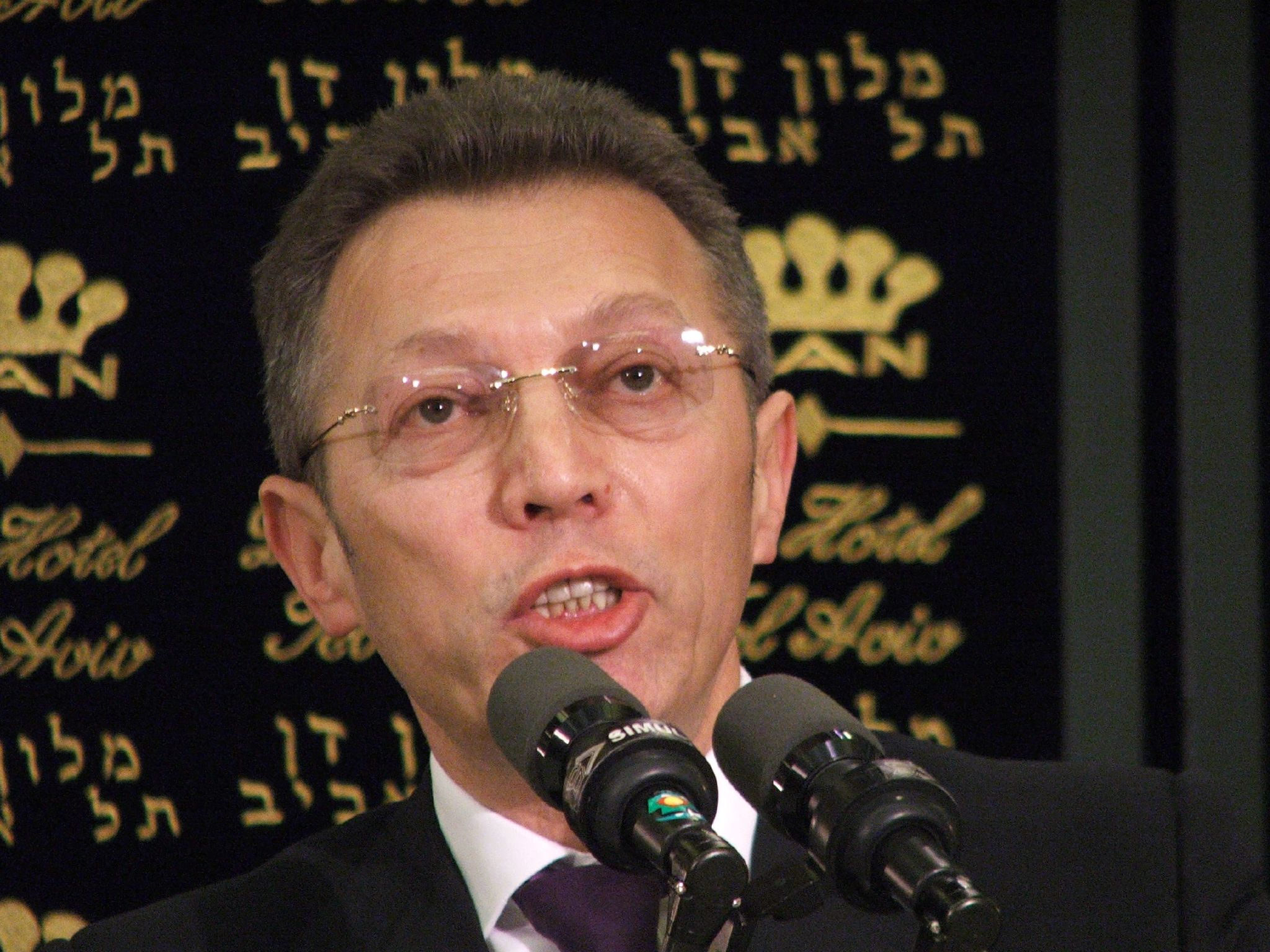
Arcadi Gaydamak during a press conference, February 2007

In February 2007, seeing the social issues in Israel, Gaydamak founded a party devoted to socio-economic issues, which he named Social Justice. Although the organization was established as a social movement, he said it could become a political party if the circumstances warranted it. In late 2007, the party contemplated taking part in the 2008 municipal elections.

Gaydamak ran for mayor of Jerusalem in November 2008, but his party won no seats on the city council. During the campaign, Gaydamak courted the East Jerusalem Palestinian vote. Gaydamak approached the Grand Mufti of Jerusalem, Muhammad Ahmad Hussein, Palestinian political figures and media, and came away with a near endorsement.

== Sport clubs and media ownership ==
In July 2005, Gaydamak became sponsor of the Hapoel Jerusalem basketball team. The following month he donated $400,000 to the Israeli Arab Bnei Sakhnin football club. On the same day, Gaydamak announced the purchase of 55% of the ownership of Beitar Jerusalem, and two days later he announced the acquisition of full ownership. Gaydamak is the patron of several Jewish charities and president of the Congress of Jewish Religious Communities and Organizations of Russia (KEROOR), Russia's oldest Jewish umbrella group.

In January 2006, Portsmouth F.C. was sold to his son, Alexandre Gaydamak by Milan Mandarić. Gaydamak later sold the club to Ali al-Faraj in 2009. In the summer of 2008, Gaydamak said his son Alexandre was owner of Portsmouth F.C., and it was confirmed by the Premier League.

In March 2006, he announced having bought the French newspaper France Soir via his company Moscow News. He had purchased the Russian Moskovskie Novosti newspaper in 2004, fired some senior journalists, and changed the paper's mandate to a firmly pro-government one, appointing a pro-Putin journalist as editor-in-chief.

In June 2007, Gaydamak negotiated a deal to buy the non-kosher supermarket chain Tiv Taam. It was reported that he was planning to make the stores comply with Jewish religious practice: close them on Shabbat and halt the sale of pork products. A few days later the deal fell through, resulting in a lawsuit.

In July 2009, Gaydamak announced his decision to give up the ownership of Beitar Jerusalem in favor of Itzik Kornfein and Guma Aguiar. Kornfein would handle buying and selling players, while Aguair would engage in financing.

== Philanthropy ==
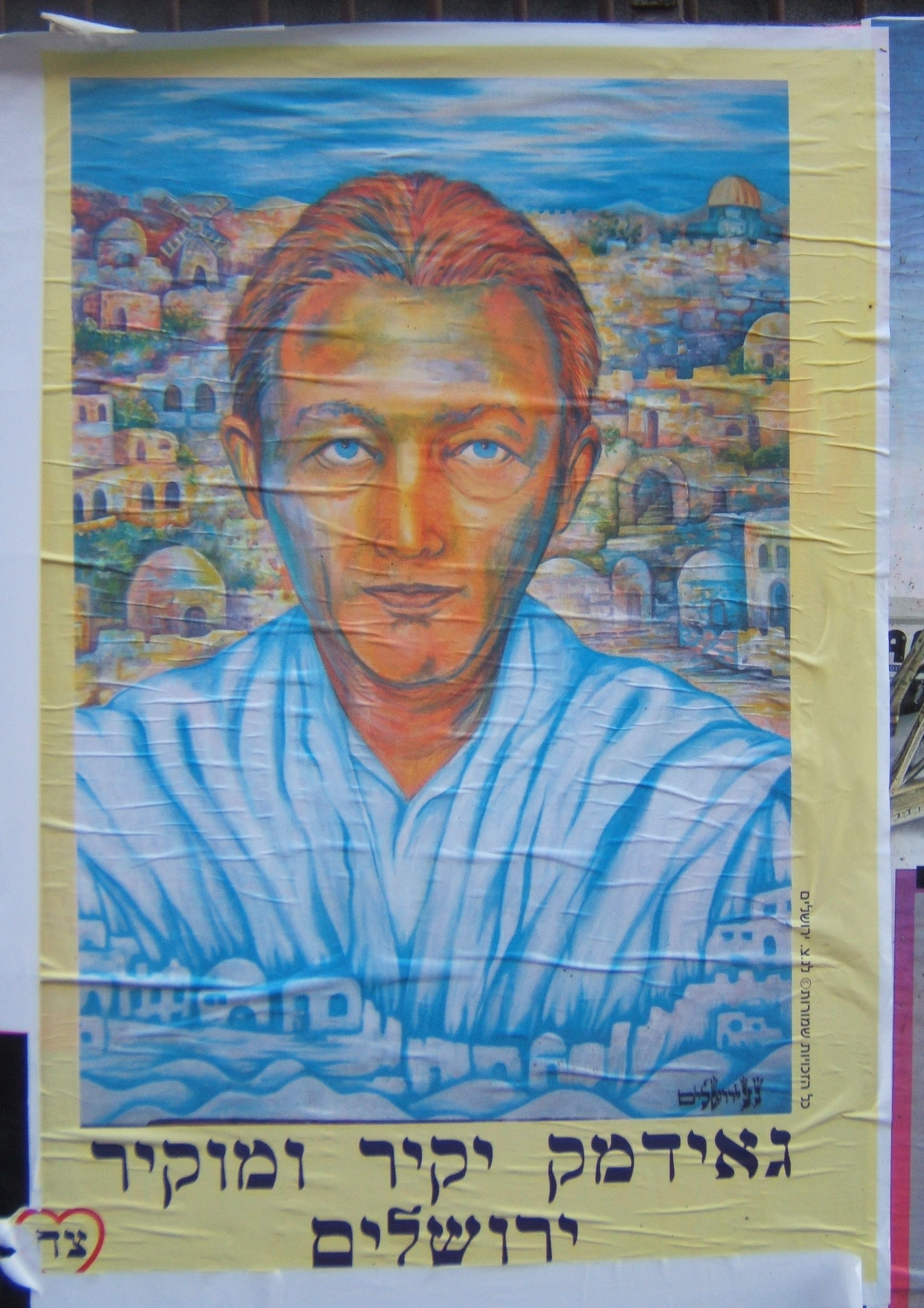
A Pashkevil appreciating Arcadi Gaydamak's contributions to Jerusalem, 2007

Gaydamak has donated to many Israeli organizations, including Magen David Adom and Hatzolah. He also pledged $50 million to the Jewish Agency for Israel, but withdrew the offer. He ended up donating $10 million.

During the 2006 Israel-Lebanon conflict Gaydamak constructed a tent-village on the Nitzanim beach, hosting thousands of families who fled the rocket-ridden North and had no place to go. Gaydamak's contributions totaled $15 million (about $500,000 a day). In November 2006, he funded a one-week-long vacation in Eilat for hundreds of Sderot residents who have experienced rocket attacks from Gaza.

== Controversy ==
=== Angola affair ===
In October 2009, Gaydamak and French magnate Pierre Falcone were convicted by a French court of organizing arms trafficking in Angola during the civil war in 1993-98 in the amount of 790 million dollars, in violation of the Lusaka Protocol. He was sentenced in absentia to six years in prison. But his conviction on the arms dealing charges was overturned by the Court of Appeal in Paris on 29 April 2011. France attempted to extradite Gaydamak from Israel but Israeli law had changed in the interim. Peter Storrie said that this situation helped precipitate the financial crisis at Portsmouth Football Club. The club was owned by Gaydamak's son Alexandre, and the charges against his father caused banks to withdraw overdraft privileges from the club, and to call the outstanding balances on its loans. In November 2015, Gaydamak, through presenting himself, began a 3-year sentence in prison.

=== Bank Hapoalim affair ===
In October 2009, Gaydamak was indicted in the Tel Aviv District Court on suspicions of money laundering through Bank Hapoalim, together with several managers of the bank and the Italian-Israeli businessman Nahum Galmor. In a plea deal, charges for laundering money were dropped and Gaydamak received a one-year suspended sentence and fine.

== Awards and recognition ==
Gaydamak won two citations from the French government: Chevalier de l'Ordre national du Mérite and the Ordre du Mérite agricole for helping to rescue two captured French pilots in the War in Bosnia in the 1990s, as well as two French intelligence officers captured by rebel factions in the Caucasus. Because these operations were secret, the citations referred to his contribution to agriculture. Former French interior minister Charles Pasqua confirmed this, saying that President Jacques Chirac had personally authorized the citations.

== See also ==
- Alexandre Gaydamak
- Lev Avnerovich Leviev
- History of the Jews in Angola
