= Graeme Souness =

Scottish footballer, manager and pundit (born 1953)

Graeme Souness CBE
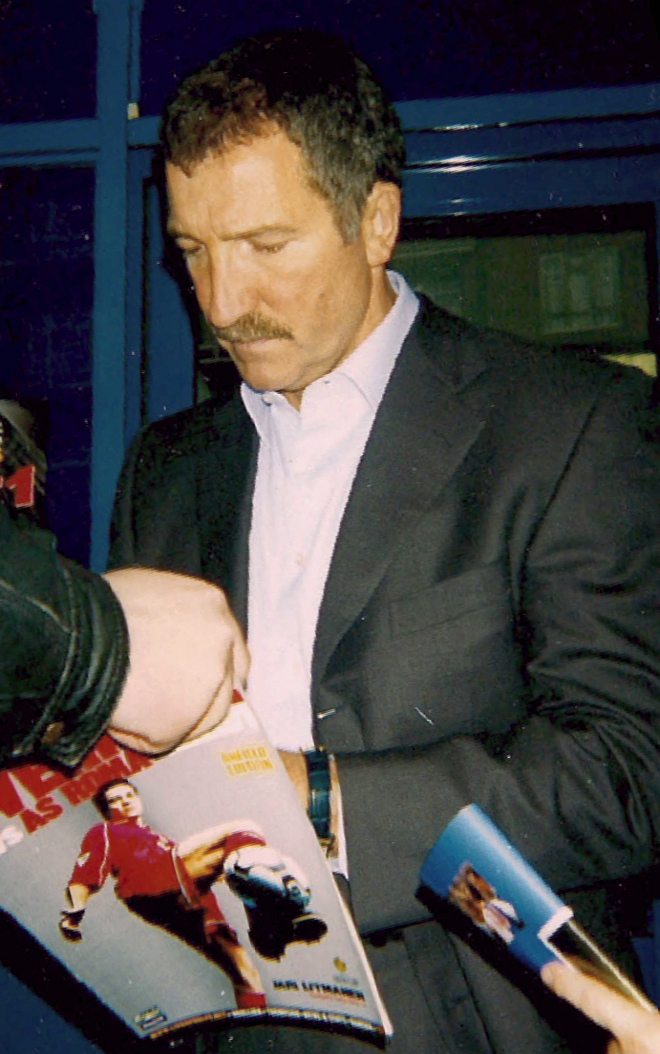
- Souness in 2001

Personal information
- Full name: Graeme James Souness
- Date of birth: 6 May 1953 (age 73)
- Place of birth: Edinburgh, Scotland
- Height: 5 ft 11 in (1.80 m)
- Position: Midfielder

Youth career
- Tynecastle Boys Club & North Merchiston BC
- Tottenham Hotspur

Senior career*
Years	Team	Apps	(Gls)
1970–1972	Tottenham Hotspur	0	(0)
1972	→ Montreal Olympique (loan)	10	(2)
1972–1978	Middlesbrough	201	(22)
1977	→ West Adelaide Hellas (loan)	6	(1)
1978–1984	Liverpool	247	(38)
1984–1986	Sampdoria	56	(8)
1986–1991	Rangers	50	(3)
Total		545	(74)

International career
1974–1986	Scotland	54	(4)

Managerial career
- 1986–1991: Rangers
- 1991–1994: Liverpool
- 1995–1996: Galatasaray
- 1996–1997: Southampton
- 1997: Torino
- 1997–1999: Benfica
- 2000–2004: Blackburn Rovers
- 2004–2006: Newcastle United
- * Club domestic league appearances and goals

Graeme James Souness CBE (/ˈsuːnɪs/; born 6 May 1953) is a Scottish former professional football player, manager and television pundit. A midfielder, Souness achieved his greatest period of success as an integral part of the Liverpool team of the late 1970s and early 1980s.

As a player, Souness established himself at Middlesbrough, where he played for six years, before moving to Liverpool in 1978. During his seven seasons at Anfield he won five league titles and three European Cups. He was named in the PFA Team of the Year every season between 1981 and 1984. Described by The Guardian as "the driving force of an all conquering side", Souness was captain at Liverpool between 1982 and 1984. In 2026 he was ranked the club's sixth greatest ever player in an official Liverpool F.C. poll. His Liverpool teammate Mark Lawrenson, who in 2015 ranked Souness fourth in his top 10 Anfield greats, called him "a great leader of men". He moved to Sampdoria in 1984 and won the Coppa Italia the following season, and then became player-manager for Rangers, leading the club to three Scottish titles and four league cups. His final game as a player came in the closing minutes of Rangers' final match of the 1989–90 season, which was his only appearance of the season.

Souness continued as Rangers coach for a further year before joining Liverpool as manager for the 1991–92 English First Division season. Winning the FA Cup in 1992, his time as manager of Liverpool did not come close to matching his success as a player at the club, and after two substandard seasons he resigned in 1994 before he went on to have spells at Galatasaray, Southampton, Torino, Benfica, Blackburn Rovers and Newcastle United.

At international level, Souness gained 54 caps for Scotland, captaining the team on 27 occasions.

== Club career ==
=== Early career ===
Graeme James Souness was born on 6 May 1953 in Edinburgh, Scotland, and was brought up in the Saughton Mains area of the city. He supported local side Heart of Midlothian and Glasgow-based Rangers. As a teenager, Souness played for local boys' club North Merchiston.

Souness' career began as an apprentice at Tottenham Hotspur under Bill Nicholson. He signed professional forms as a 15-year-old in 1968. Frustrated at a lack of first-team opportunities, the teenage Souness told Nicholson he should be selected for the first team. Souness made one first-team appearance for Spurs, in a UEFA Cup tie as a substitute.

During the summer of 1972, Souness played in the North American Soccer League for the Montreal Olympique. He appeared in 10 of his team's 14 matches and was named in the league's All-Star team for that season.

=== Middlesbrough ===
Spurs sold Souness to Middlesbrough for £30,000 in 1972. He made his first appearance for Middlesbrough on 6 January 1973 in a 2–1 league defeat to Fulham at Craven Cottage. His first goal came on 11 December 1973 in a 3–0 league victory over Preston North End at Ayresome Park.

Souness' tenacious style began to garner acclaim during his time at Middlesbrough. His first season saw Middlesbrough finish fourth, two places and 14 points short of promotion. Jack Charlton was appointed Middlesbrough manager, his first managerial post, in May 1973. One of Charlton's first signings was experienced former Celtic midfielder Bobby Murdoch, a fellow Scot whom Souness later cited as an important influence in the development of his playing style. Promotion as champions of the Second Division followed in 1973–74. Souness' influence was demonstrated when he scored a hat-trick in the season's final fixture, an 8–0 victory over Sheffield Wednesday, and he was subsequently named the club's player of the year.

=== Liverpool ===
With Graeme in your team, it was like attending your first day at secondary school and the toughest bloke there was your elder brother.

— Liverpool teammate Mark Lawrenson.

Souness' playing career is best remembered for his seven seasons at Liverpool, where he won five League Championships, three European Cups and four League Cups, and spent the last three seasons as captain. His time at Anfield began in January 1978 as a replacement for veteran Ian Callaghan. After winning his first European Cup in 1977, Liverpool manager Bob Paisley sought reinforcements by signing three Scottish players, all of whom were to contribute substantially to further success. Central defender Alan Hansen arrived from Partick Thistle for £110,000. Kenny Dalglish – an established Scottish international – signed from Celtic for a then British record fee of £440,000. Souness formed the final part of the Scottish triumvirate, leaving Middlesbrough in acrimonious circumstances for a club-record fee of £350,000 on 10 January 1978.

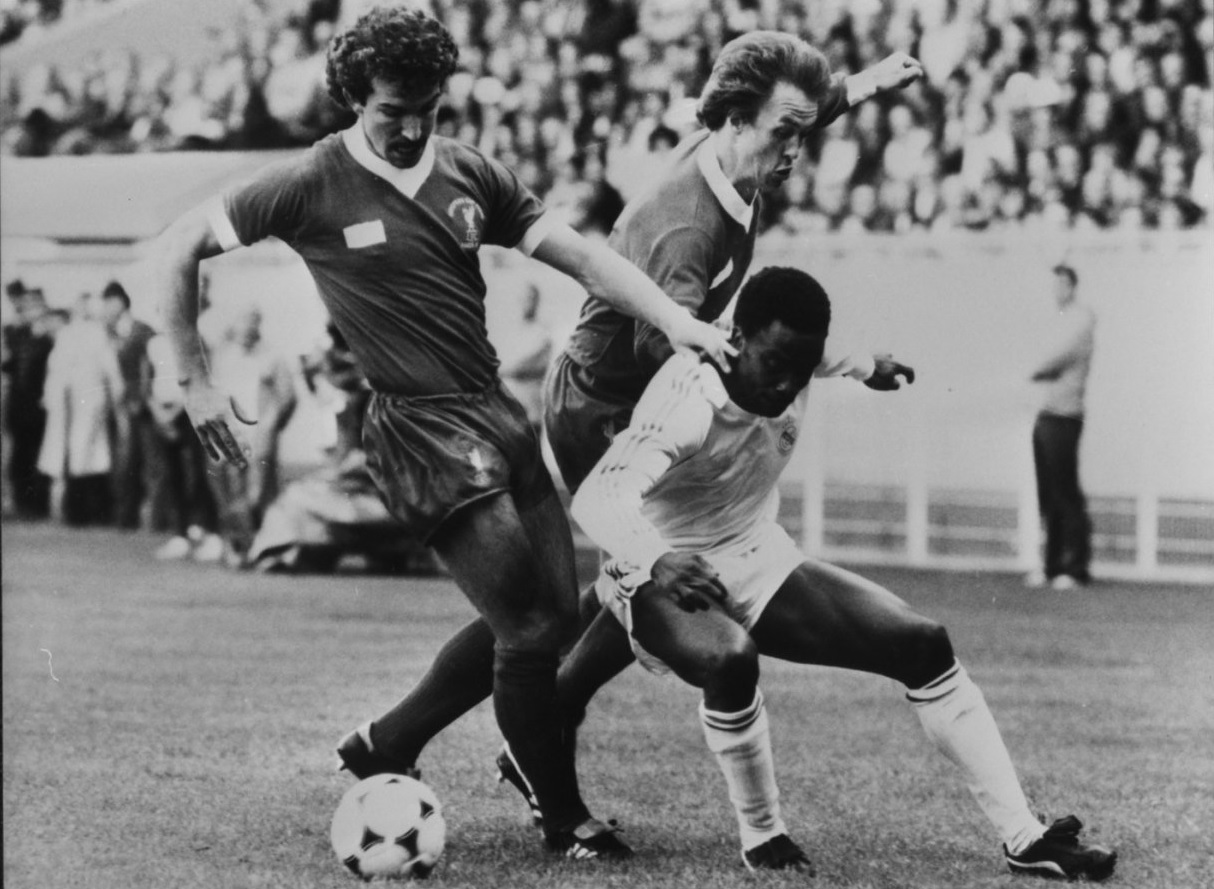
Souness (left) playing for Liverpool against Real Madrid in the 1981 European Cup final

Souness' Liverpool debut came in a 1–0 league victory over West Bromwich Albion at The Hawthorns on 14 January 1978. His first goal – a volley from just inside the penalty box, eventually awarded fans' goal of the season – came in a 3–1 win over rivals Manchester United at Anfield on 25 February 1978. Souness played a pivotal role in Liverpool's retention of the European Cup against FC Bruges in 1978 at Wembley Stadium, providing the pass for Kenny Dalglish to score the match's only goal. Souness's first League title medals were won in seasons 1978–79 and 1979–80. A second European Cup medal for Souness arrived in 1981 with a 1–0 victory over Real Madrid – the culmination of a campaign in which Souness scored a hat-trick in the quarter-final against CSKA Sofia.

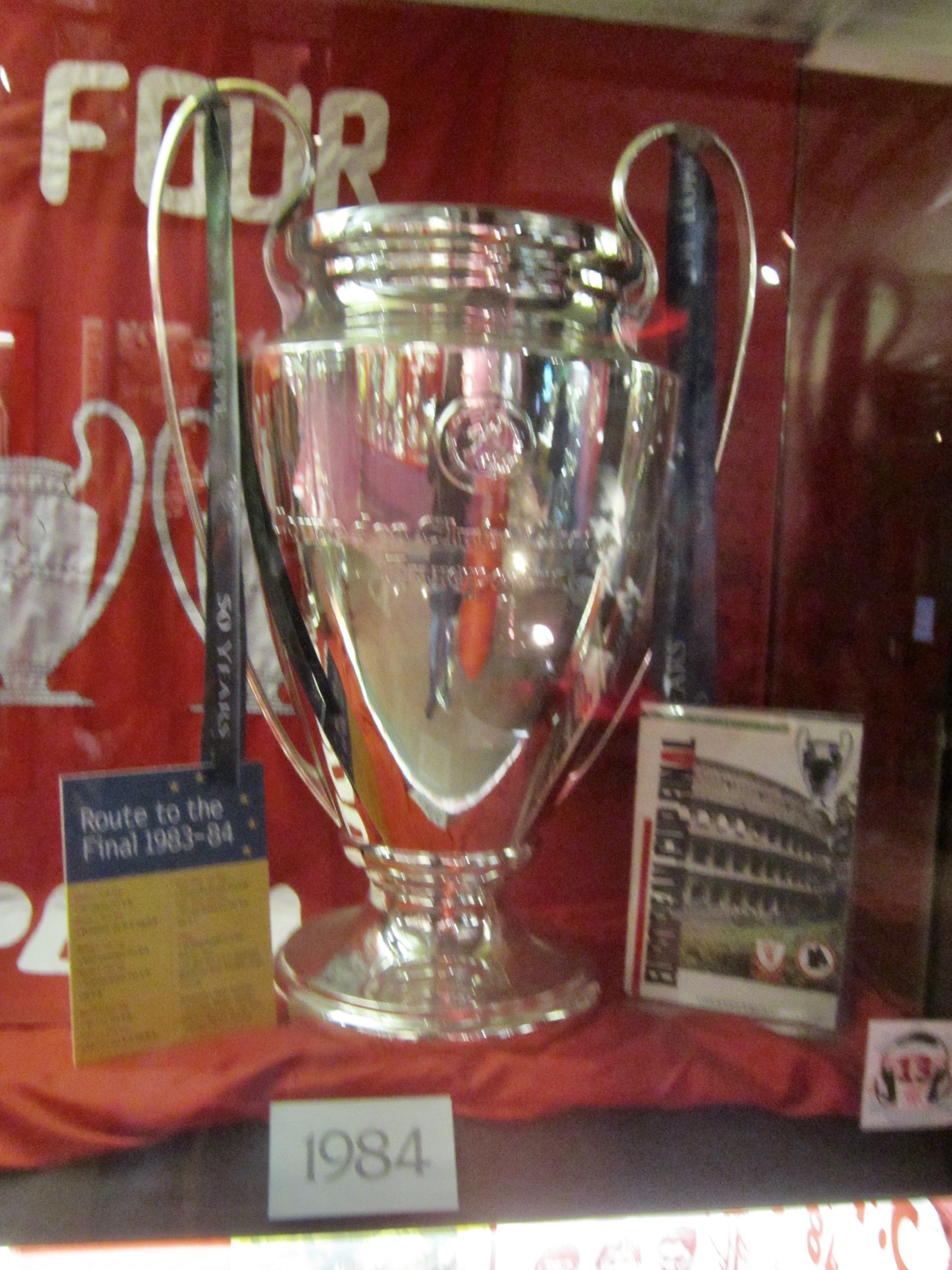
The 1984 European Cup in the Liverpool F.C. museum, which Souness (winning the competition for a third time) lifted as captain in his last game for the club.

This burst of success prompted Paisley to award Souness the club captaincy for season 1981–82, to the chagrin of the incumbent Phil Thompson who had made some errors that season and with whom Paisley had a vicious row during one match at Aston Villa. Thompson initially refused to speak to Souness, claiming he had "stolen the captaincy" from behind his back. This was the start of several long-running feuds between the two robust characters, and over the coming years, they would confront each other in various circumstances.

His steel alone would have been enough to make him one of the top midfield players of his generation. His passing ability alone would have made him one of the best midfield players of his generation. But when you put the two of them together, I think you have the best central midfield player this country's ever seen.

— Jamie Carragher on Souness's combination of power and guile.

Under Souness' captaincy, two trophies followed as Liverpool regained the League championship and retained the League Cup, trophies that were successfully defended in season 1982–83. For the trophy award presentation after the 2–1 win over Manchester United in 1983, Souness stepped back and insisted that Paisley collect the trophy in the manager's retirement season. The appointment of Joe Fagan as Paisley's successor followed, and in pre-season Souness called a meeting among the players. According to teammate Mark Lawrenson, Souness said: "We think the world of this fella and this year we are absolutely determined to be successful for him.' To a man everyone said: 'Yep, you're right.'"

He was an exceptional footballer, a leader on the park and a guy who wanted to win at all costs.

— Liverpool teammate Kenny Dalglish.

In 1983–84, Souness lifted three trophies. He scored the winning goal in the 1984 League Cup final replay at Maine Road against Merseyside rivals Everton, the first all-Merseyside cup final. Liverpool won the league for the third consecutive season and reached the 1984 European Cup final after beating Romanian champions Dinamo București in the semi-final 3–1 on aggregate. In an ill-tempered first leg at Anfield, Souness broke the jaw of Dinamo captain Lică Movilă, which went unpunished by the referee. Liverpool won the 1984 final after a penalty shoot-out win over Roma, with Souness scoring one of the penalties in the shootout. Souness' Liverpool career ended in 1984 after 358 appearances and 56 goals.

In 1984, Souness was named in the PFA Team of the Year for the fourth season running and came sixth for the 1984 Ballon d'Or. Regarded as one of the greatest ever Liverpool players, ranking sixth in a club poll in 2026 with the former captain also widely named in any all-time Liverpool XI, Daniel Taylor in The Guardian writes:

His greatness was because he combined warrior instincts with subtlety, vision and football intelligence. He was, in the words of the sportswriter David Miller, "a bear of a man with the touch of a violinist".

=== Sampdoria ===
In 1984, after rejecting a transfer to Spanish club FC Barcelona, Souness joined Italian club Sampdoria for a fee of £650,000 on a three-year contract. In doing so he became the third Scot to play in the Italian Football Championship since its re-brand to Serie A in 1929. In doing so he succeeded Denis Law and Joe Jordan (Law's Scots-raised Torino teammate Joe Baker spent the first six weeks of his life in Liverpool and was thus deemed English under international football rules of the time). Souness and England international Trevor Francis–a player at the Genoa-based club since 1982–added experience to an emerging group of future Italian internationals, including Roberto Mancini, Pietro Vierchowod and Gianluca Vialli.

In his first season, Souness succeeded Jordan to become the second Scot to play in a Coppa Italia final. Souness, in contrast to Jordan, collected a winner's medal. Sampdoria won the 1985 Coppa Italia Final 3–1 on aggregate over Serie A rivals Milan, securing the cup for the first time in club history. Souness scored the only goal of the game in the away first leg of the final.

=== Rangers ===
Souness' career in Italy ended in 1986 as he took up the position of player-manager at Rangers. His competitive debut – in the opening match of the 1986–87 season, against Hibernian in his hometown of Edinburgh – saw him sent off after two yellow cards in the first 34 minutes, with the second following a high challenge on Hibernian striker George McCluskey which left a gash on his leg.

Souness praised Terry Butcher, who joined at the same time as Souness, as a key signing for the club.

Disciplinary problems – something that had recurred periodically throughout Souness's career – resurfaced on a number of occasions during his time as a player at Rangers, and the spell was also blighted by injury. He made 73 appearances in total for Rangers (50 in the league), scoring three goals. His final appearance as a player was at Ibrox in a 2–0 victory over Dunfermline Athletic in Rangers' last home match of the 1989–90 season, when he brought himself on for the final 20 minutes.

== International career ==
While a Middlesbrough player, Souness received his first international cap for Scotland on 30 October 1974 in a 3–0 friendly victory over East Germany at Hampden Park. By the time Souness was selected by manager Ally McLeod for the Scotland squad for the 1978 FIFA World Cup in Argentina, he had been awarded only six caps. His move to Liverpool increased his profile. Souness missed Scotland's first two matches, a defeat to Peru and a draw with Iran, due to injury. He was selected for the final group match against the Netherlands. Souness contributed to a 3–2 victory that nevertheless saw Scotland eliminated from the tournament on goal difference.

Souness played in two further World Cups. The first, in 1982 in Spain, saw Souness play all three group stage matches. His first international goal arrived in the final game prior to elimination, a 2–2 draw with the Soviet Union in Málaga.

A final World Cup appearance came in 1986 in Mexico, at a time when Souness had already been appointed Rangers player-manager. Souness played in defeats to Denmark and West Germany. He later said he had performed poorly in those matches, having struggled with the high altitude and losing a significant amount of weight and power. Souness was omitted by caretaker manager Alex Ferguson for Scotland's final match against Uruguay. Souness claimed in his autobiography, The Management Years, and press interviews that this was the only time in his whole career he had been dropped. Souness also stated Ferguson was unusually apologetic and was very respectful and diplomatic in his conversation with Souness at night when he broke the news to him, as he held Souness in high regard. His international career ended after the 1986 World Cup. He had made 54 appearances in almost 12 years, scoring four goals.

== Coaching and managerial career ==
=== Rangers ===
Souness was appointed Rangers' first player-manager in April 1986, signing from Sampdoria for a fee of £300,000 and succeeding Jock Wallace. Financed initially by the club's then owner, Lawrence Marlborough, Souness and club chairman David Holmes embarked upon a bold strategy of reclaiming the footballing ascendancy Rangers had lacked in recent years, having not won the league title since 1978, with all of the Scottish league titles since then being claimed by their arch-rivals Celtic, and the emerging "New Firm" of Aberdeen and Dundee United. A 33-year-old Souness arrived at Ibrox with a reputation as one of Europe's leading midfielders. His signing was unusual in that Scottish clubs had rarely been able to sign top-quality internationals, including Scots, from other leagues. Scottish clubs had often found themselves being in the position of selling their top players to English clubs, notable examples being Kenny Dalglish (sold from Celtic to Liverpool in 1977), Gordon Strachan (sold from Aberdeen to Manchester United in 1984) and Frank McAvennie (sold from St Mirren to West Ham United in 1985).

A string of major signings for Rangers from English clubs began to be termed the "Souness Revolution". Significantly, this reversed the historic pattern of Scotland's most able footballers playing in England. His first signings included Terry Butcher, captain of Ipswich Town and an established England international, and Chris Woods of Norwich City, England's second-choice goalkeeper. Subsequent seasons saw the arrival of other English internationals, such as Trevor Steven, Gary Stevens, Trevor Francis and Ray Wilkins. Souness was able to offer the lure of European club competition, at a time – 1985–1990 – when English clubs were banned from Europe in the wake of the Heysel Stadium disaster. Rangers profited from this by embarking upon a signing policy which drew on their relative wealth to compete, for the first time, directly with England's most powerful clubs.

Souness revitalised Rangers quickly began to dominate Scottish football. In his first season, 1986–87, they won the Championship and the League Cup, defeating Celtic 2–1 in the final. They retained the League Cup in 1987–88, defeating Aberdeen on penalties after extra-time, although they surrendered their league title to Celtic. Two more Championships were to follow, this time in successive seasons (1988–89 and 1989–90), and a further two League Cup victories, over Aberdeen 3–2 in 1988–89 and Celtic 2–1 (after extra time) in 1990–91. In April 1991, Rangers were in the process of winning a fourth league title in five seasons when Souness left Rangers to take over as manager of Liverpool. He was replaced by his assistant Walter Smith four matches prior to the end of what was to become another championship-winning season. Rangers went on to win six further league titles in succession, as well as a string of domestic cups, under Smith's management.

Although Souness had been hugely successful in his time at Ibrox, his time in charge had not been without controversy. A significant act was the signing of Mo Johnston in 1989. Rangers, historically a team supported by Protestants, had for most of the 20th century a policy of refusing to sign Roman Catholics. Although there had been many Rangers players of Catholic faith, particularly before the sectarian divisions hardened after World War I, none of them were as high-profile as Johnston. He had previously played for Celtic, and had looked set to rejoin them from Nantes until Souness made an offer to sign him. Johnston publicly announced he would return to Celtic in a press conference at Celtic Park, but days later he signed for Rangers. Souness stated that religion was not an issue for him; his first wife was a Catholic and the children from that marriage were baptised Catholic. His main consideration was that Johnston was a good player, but he also believed that the signing would damage Celtic. He was also responsible for ordering a picture of Queen Elizabeth II be hung in the Rangers dressing room, a tradition Rangers continued.

Souness also found himself under scrutiny from the Scottish Football Association (SFA) and Scottish League more than once. A succession of confrontational after-match comments pitched Souness regularly at loggerheads with both organisations, prompting touchline bans which Souness circumvented in characteristically provocative fashion by naming himself as a substitute, allowing access as a player to the dugout. In May 1990, Souness was fined £5,000 by the SFA for breaching a touchline ban after television pictures showed him in the tunnel area yelling at his players on the pitch. Souness later said that conflict with officialdom was one of the principal factors precipitating his departure from Ibrox. Another factor in 1991 was "The Storm in a teacup" when there was conflict with St Johnstone's tea lady, Aggie Moffat.

In 2009, Souness said of his time as Rangers manager, "When I look back on my actions and antics at Ibrox I bordered on being out of order. I was obnoxious and difficult to deal with." He was manager during 261 matches in all competitions for Rangers, winning 125 (64%) of 193 league fixtures.

=== Liverpool ===
Kenny Dalglish, who had played alongside Souness at Liverpool, had resigned as Liverpool manager in February 1991, despite having won three league titles and two FA Cups in the previous five seasons, and with Liverpool still being in contention for both trophies when he resigned. Long-serving coach Ronnie Moran was put in temporary charge following Dalglish's sudden resignation, but he did not want the job permanently. Souness was appointed Liverpool manager, having signed a five-year contract, on 16 April 1991, leaving Rangers with four games of their season remaining.

No (we weren't past our best), not at all. It was still a fantastic side. It was nothing to do with the players getting on a bit. It was the manager who came in and changed the whole ethos of the club. I was delighted when he (Souness) joined. He admits he made a lot of mistakes. I like him for that. I've seen him a number of times since and he openly says, ‘Yeah, I did make mistakes.’ He's honest, he's an honest guy. But it wasn't the right time for him and he made lots of mistakes.

— Steve McMahon, a key member of Dalglish's title-winning sides, and one of the star names who left under Souness.

Souness took over at Anfield just before Liverpool surrendered their defence of the English league title to Arsenal and finished second. He made a major reorganisation of the squad in his first six months as manager, bringing in Dean Saunders for an English record of £2.9 million as well as defenders Mark Wright and Rob Jones and midfielder Mark Walters. He also gave a regular place in the team to 19-year-old midfielder Steve McManaman, whose debut had come under Dalglish in December 1990, and a debut to one of Dalglish's last signings, teenage midfielder Jamie Redknapp. At the end of the season, he gave a professional contract to 17-year-old striker Robbie Fowler. Costly departures included Peter Beardsley and Steve Staunton in the summer, with Steve McMahon, the midfield general who Dalglish had signed in 1985 to replace Souness as a player, departing in December 1991.

During the 1991–92 season, Liverpool rarely looked like serious title contenders, and it soon became a two-horse race between Leeds United and Manchester United. Liverpool would finish sixth, and Leeds eventually won the title, which was confirmed after Liverpool defeated their arch rivals Manchester United 2–0 at Anfield. They returned to European competition that season after six years of isolation following the Heysel disaster of 1985, and reached the UEFA Cup quarter-finals, where they were eliminated by Genoa. By April 1992, they were only in contention for the FA Cup. Souness had major heart surgery that month. A controversy arose after the FA Cup semi-final against Portsmouth, which Liverpool needed a replay and penalties to win. In the event of a victory for Liverpool, an interview was due to be published in the Sun, a British tabloid, with Souness celebrating the win and his own successful surgery. The photograph which accompanied the interview was of Souness, in his hospital ward, kissing his girlfriend with joy at his own recovery and his team's win. The interview was due to go in alongside the match report on 14 April 1992, but the late end to the game meant the deadline for publication was missed and the report, with interview and photograph, went in on 15 April instead – the third anniversary of the Hillsborough disaster. Many Liverpool fans reacted with fury after seeing the interview was conducted with The Sun, a newspaper which had been reviled and widely shunned on Merseyside following its false reporting on the disaster. Souness himself had restricted Liverpool players from talking to The Sun. Although he apologised at the time, Souness has since said that he probably should have resigned at that point. Against the advice of his doctors, Souness attended the 1992 FA Cup final, which Liverpool won 2–0 against Sunderland.

The following 1992–93 season was an even more frustrating one for Souness. In July 1992 he sold another key member of the title-winning sides Ray Houghton to Aston Villa, and just after the start of the season he sold Saunders, also to Villa, with the feeling he was incompatible with Ian Rush in attack. While Houghton, Staunton and Saunders all shone under Ron Atkinson at Villa and became key players in their near-successful title challenge, Saunders successor at Anfield Paul Stewart proved to be a huge disappointment, scoring just one league goal from 32 appearances over the next two seasons, struggling with injuries as well as inconsistent form. Top scorer Rush was having a difficult time scoring goals, and Liverpool spent much of the season in the bottom half of the table. They entered March still only in 15th place, but an excellent final quarter of the season, in which Rush scored 11 Premier League goals, including two in the final game, a 6–2 win over Tottenham at Anfield, saw the club finish sixth. This time there was no success in any of the cup competitions, meaning that there would be no European competition for Liverpool in the 1993–94 season. Aside from the six seasons when Liverpool were banned from European competitions, this was the first time since 1963 that Liverpool had failed to qualify for Europe. Two board meetings took place at the climax of the season over Souness's position, with the club's former star winger Steve Heighway touted as his successor, but ultimately he was backed by the chairman David Moores.

The pressure on Souness continued to mount throughout 1993, but he made another attempt at revitalising Liverpool by signing defender Julian Dicks and striker Nigel Clough for the 1993–94 season. The season began well, but the disappointing results quickly returned. In early January 1994 the club came from 3–0 down against Manchester United to draw 3–3 at Anfield, in what was the fixture's last game in front of the standing Kop. Souness finally resigned as Liverpool manager at the end of the month when Liverpool suffered a shock FA Cup exit at the hands of Bristol City at Anfield. He was succeeded by long-serving coach Roy Evans.

It soon became apparent that some of the central facets of a successful manager, things like effective man-management skills and tactical expertise, were missing from the Souness armoury.

— Well Red Magazine.

Souness's three-year reign as Liverpool manager was not remembered with fondness by the club's fans, although his reign did bring some success to the club. Apart from guiding them to FA Cup success in 1992, he also oversaw the breakthrough of three young players who would excel in Liverpool's improved performances under Evans over the next five years in McManaman, Fowler and Redknapp. Other than substandard results the main criticisms of Souness was his transfer record (allowing good players to leave and not adequately replacing them), flaws in his man-management and tactical set up.

Souness later said in his autobiography The Management Years that he believed he faced an uphill struggle from the start for a number of reasons. The majority of key players were in their late 20s or early 30s when he took over, and some appeared to have passed their peak. He knew they had to be eventually replaced and he doubted the desire of some of them. He said the senior players also appeared not to want to listen to him and may have resented his disciplinarian approach to their behaviour, and also claimed a number of players – including Beardsley and McMahon – asked for improved terms in their contracts or they would move elsewhere. In the end, Beardsley, McMahon and Houghton were sold, seemingly before suitable replacements were found and these key components of Kenny Dalglish's great side were not adequately replaced. Souness said Rush and Houghton had also questioned why new signings like Mark Wright were earning more money than them, despite not yet having won any trophies. The sale of Beardsley to local rivals Everton was a controversial move, and the player performed well for Everton in his two seasons there, and continued to do well despite his advancing years during four seasons at Newcastle United.

Souness also claims Liverpool chief executive Peter Robinson at the time had warned him this was a Liverpool team in decline and that they only had one player who was still "great" – John Barnes. Souness was left disappointed by Barnes as he was at this time frequently suffering from injuries, and in particular suffered a ruptured achilles tendon which was to eventually affect his acceleration therefore affecting his playing style, and not giving Souness what he wanted from a vintage Barnes at his peak, which was what he saw as a "devastating winger with pace and goalscoring touch". He had also said Barnes was once the "best player in Britain" but unfortunately only saw flashes of his brilliance.

Souness also fell out with former Liverpool teammates Tommy Smith and Phil Thompson during his time in charge at Anfield. In his autobiography, Souness said that Thompson, the reserve team manager, was overheard angrily criticising his tactics and purchases behind his back. This was overheard by Manchester United assistant manager Brian Kidd and relayed to Walter Smith, who was so alarmed by Thompson's behaviour that he drove from Scotland to Liverpool to tell Souness what had been said. Souness dismissed Thompson as a result and the two have remained bitter towards each other since, with Thompson claiming in his own book he would never speak to Souness again as a result. Souness said he had a number of disputes as a Liverpool player with Thompson, including in 1981, when Thompson initially refused to speak to Souness for a while after he lost the captaincy to him; Thompson had accused Souness to his face and in front of the other Liverpool players of "stealing the captaincy behind his back". They also had an argument and physical fight which took place after Thompson had accused Souness of marrying his first wife Danielle only because she was wealthy. Souness believed these incidents may have contributed to Thompson's hostility and disrespect of him. Tommy Smith had been strongly critical of Souness in the local media at the time, and he had been caught mixing with the players and some of the coaches at Anfield despite no longer having an official position at the club. Souness banned Smith from the club areas, and said that in his last phone call with Smith, instructing him not to be seen around the official club areas, he was certain he had "made an enemy for life".

=== Galatasaray ===
After leaving Liverpool, Souness was out of work for over a year, despite reports at the end of the 1993–94 season linking him with a return to Middlesbrough, this time as a manager, a job which went to Bryan Robson instead.

Souness went to manage Galatasaray in Turkey in June 1995, and again managed to court controversy with local issues, nearly sparking a riot after placing a large Galatasaray flag into the centre circle of the pitch of arch rivals Fenerbahçe after Galatasaray had beaten them in the Turkish Cup final on 24 April 1996. The iconic image of Souness planting the flag drew comparisons with Turkish hero Ulubatlı Hasan, who was killed as he planted the Ottoman flag at the end of the Siege of Constantinople. This earned Souness the nickname "Ulubatlı Souness".

=== Southampton ===
Souness then returned to England to manage Southampton, but after one season he resigned, citing differences with chairman Rupert Lowe. Souness is perhaps best remembered at Southampton for signing Senegalese player Ali Dia, supposedly on the recommendation of former FIFA World Player of the Year and former Liberian striker George Weah. Souness did not check any of Dia's credentials as a good player, which proved to be a hoax instigated by Dia's friend (who had made the initial call). When Dia made his sole appearance in the Premier League, as a substitute for Matt Le Tissier, he performed amazingly poorly and was substituted. A notable high point of the season was a 6–3 home win over defending champions Manchester United in late October.

The Saints managed to avoid relegation from the Premier League in 1996–97, finishing 16th, but he resigned towards the end of May 1997. Within days, it was reported Everton, Liverpool's local rivals, were interested in appointing Souness as manager to succeed Joe Royle, but Howard Kendall was appointed for a third time instead.

=== Torino ===
After his stint at Southampton, Souness went back to Italy to become the coach at Torino. When he arrived, it was clear he would have no say in what players he could buy or sell, as the club's owner made those decisions. Souness lasted just four months before being dismissed.

=== Benfica ===
In November 1997, Souness was appointed by Benfica's new chairman João Vale e Azevedo, who promised to return the club to its former glory. The Scottish manager brought several British players from the Premier League, including defenders Steve Harkness and Gary Charles, midfielders Michael Thomas and Mark Pembridge and forwards Dean Saunders and Brian Deane, as well as refusing to sign emerging talent Deco. 18 months later, Souness left the club and stated, "Vale e Azevedo lies when he looks in the eyes. Be careful, this man is dangerous."

=== Blackburn Rovers ===
Souness returned to the English league in March 2000 to become manager of Blackburn Rovers, earning promotion back to the Premier League in his first full season. During his four-year spell at Blackburn, he initially got the very best out of talented youngsters such as Damien Duff, David Dunn and Matt Jansen, as well as bringing Henning Berg back to the club and signing big name players like Andy Cole, Tugay Kerimoğlu, Barry Ferguson, Brad Friedel and Dwight Yorke. Cole and Jansen scored in Blackburn's 2–1 League Cup final victory over Tottenham Hotspur in February 2002. Blackburn were still battling against relegation back to Division One when they lifted the League Cup, but went on to finish a secure 10th in the final table.

Souness then guided Blackburn to a sixth-place finish in 2003 and took them into the UEFA Cup for a second successive season, before finishing a disappointing 15th in 2003–04.

=== Newcastle United ===
Souness left Blackburn in September 2004 to become manager of Newcastle United following the sacking of 71-year-old Sir Bobby Robson a few games into the season.

Despite a promising start on Tyneside, Souness quickly fell out with a number of players, including Welsh international Craig Bellamy, who left the club to join Blackburn, after being loaned out to Celtic. Laurent Robert, Olivier Bernard and Jermaine Jenas were also reported to have left the club on bad terms with Souness. The club finished 14th in the league (their lowest finish since promotion in 1993) and despite making it to the quarter-finals of the UEFA Cup and the semi-finals of the FA Cup, Souness found himself under mounting pressure from Toon supporters.

Newcastle had a slow start to the 2005–06 season, but Souness was hoping that the purchase of Michael Owen from Real Madrid on 30 August for an estimated club-record fee of £17 million would help to turn the club's fortunes around and bring a repeat of the top five finishes achieved during Robson's final three seasons. Newcastle recorded a win in the Tyne-Wear derby against Sunderland (3–2), and went on to win their next three matches, keeping three clean sheets. Souness seemed to be tightening up Newcastle in defence, with six clean sheets in Newcastle's first 12 games of the season, as many as the whole of the preceding campaign. His decision to reunite the former England striker duo Alan Shearer and Michael Owen initially appeared shrewd. However, Owen cracked the fifth metatarsal of his right foot when he clashed with England teammate Paul Robinson during a 2–0 defeat at Tottenham on 30 December 2005 and was out of action for three months, adding to the club's injury woes.

Souness was criticised for an apparent lack of long-term planning at Newcastle, centred on a small squad, and a consequent vulnerability to injury among his players. Expensive signings – such as Jean-Alain Boumsong for £8 million, and Albert Luque for £10 million – failed to live up to expectations. By the beginning of February 2006, Newcastle United were placed 15th in the Premier League table and sliding dangerously towards a relegation battle, despite having spent over £50million on players in the last 18 months. On 2 February 2006, Souness was sacked as manager by chairman Freddy Shepherd and replaced by United's Youth Academy Director Glenn Roeder.

In the club's DVD season review for the 2005–06 season, goalkeeper Shay Given and defender Robbie Elliott acknowledged Souness was under pressure at the club as a result of injuries to the squad and admitted some players were to blame for their lack of all-round effort, but also admitted there was a bad atmosphere at the training ground, with Souness seeming to favour some players over others. Alan Shearer acknowledged the fans never really accepted Souness, as well as several injuries being instrumental in damaging the team's confidence. Chairman Freddy Shepherd declared it was the team's formation and loss against Manchester City that prompted his decision to sack Souness.

Souness did not return to football management after leaving Newcastle.

=== Stevens inquiry ===
In the report of the Stevens inquiry into football corruption published in June 2007, Souness was criticised for an apparent lack of consistency:

There remains inconsistencies in evidence provided by Graeme Souness – a former manager of the club – and Kenneth Shepherd – apparently acting in an undefined role but not as a club official – as to their respective roles in transfer negotiations.

Souness issued a statement denying any wrongdoing:

"I cannot understand why my name features in this report. I volunteered full information to [investigations company] Quest as a witness and I have heard nothing further from them."

The Stevens inquiry then issued a clarification:

We wish to make it clear that inconsistencies did not exist within the evidence given by Graeme Souness to Quest concerning his role in transfers covered by the Inquiry during his time as manager of Newcastle United FC and neither the Premier League nor do Quest have any concerns in this regard.

In July 2007, Newcastle United was raided by the City of London Police, who were investigating transfer deals involving Newcastle, Rangers and Portsmouth. Two Souness transfers, Jean-Alain Boumsong and Amdy Faye, were among a list of 17 transfers not cleared by Quest. The Boumsong deal in particular was so odd that it was widely commented upon at the time. Four months after succeeding Sir Bobby Robson as manager, Souness was in his first transfer window as Newcastle manager. At £8.2 million, Boumsong was his first big signing and Souness said he would replace Jonathan Woodgate in the Newcastle defence, which had conceded several leads earlier in the season.

Newcastle were aware of Boumsong prior to his move from Auxerre to Rangers on a free transfer. Robson had travelled to France to watch him, but he declined the opportunity to sign Boumsong. Liverpool were also interested in signing Boumsong. Robson's doubts were confirmed when Boumsong marked Alan Shearer in a pre-season game against Rangers. Shearer came off to speak in dismissive terms about the Frenchman's lack of physicality, and he later mentioned Boumsong's previous availability on a free transfer on television.

When Boumsong was given a torrid time by DJ Campbell during his Newcastle debut against Yeading in the FA Cup, doubts over the wisdom of the transfer mushroomed. The agent in the Boumsong and Faye transfers was Willie McKay. On 7 November 2007, Quest issued the following statement about McKay's dealings:

Further to the key findings from the final Quest report published on 15 June 2007 by the Premier League, Quest would like to emphasise that, in that report, it was clear that no evidence of irregular payments was found in the transfers in the inquiry period which involved the agent Willie McKay. Quest would also like to thank Mr McKay for his cooperation with the inquiry.

== Career after management ==
=== Media work ===
Souness has appeared as a television analyst in the UK and Ireland regularly since his managerial career ended. He was one of the main analysts on Sky Sports coverage of the Premier League, regularly appearing on the Super Sunday programme featuring the biggest head-to-head matches, and was one of the main pundits used on their UEFA Champions League coverage until they lost the rights in 2015. He left Sky Sports on 30 April 2023.

Souness previously featured on RTÉ's live coverage of the UEFA Champions League and on their highlights show Premier Soccer Saturday, covering the Premier League. He was also regularly seen covering RTÉ's coverage of Republic of Ireland football internationals. Souness contributed to RTÉ Sport's coverage of the 2010 FIFA World Cup, alongside Johnny Giles, Eamon Dunphy, Liam Brady, Ronnie Whelan, Denis Irwin, Ossie Ardiles and Dietmar Hamann for the duration of the group stage.

During analysis of the World Cup match between Ghana and Serbia on 13 June 2010, Souness made a controversial comment involving Nemanja Vidić and Fernando Torres live on air, commenting, "Vidic got raped... sorry, taken apart by Torres at Liverpool", which forced RTÉ to censure Souness and publicly apologise after a commercial break.

As a pundit, Souness is also known for his frequent criticism of Paul Pogba. Pogba himself is unaware what he has done to warrant such criticism. Instead, he affirms he has no idea of Souness' existence.

=== Possible returns to management ===
In June 2006, the chairman of Crystal Palace, Simon Jordan, said he wished to discuss with Souness a role in managing the club following the departure of Iain Dowie. However, no contract materialised.

Souness looked to be the front-runner for the Bolton Wanderers manager's job following the departure of his former Liverpool teammate Sammy Lee in October 2007, but later pulled out of the running when it became apparent the job was set to be given to Gary Megson. At around the same time, Souness was linked with taking over the Republic of Ireland national team.

In January 2008, Souness announced he would be willing to return to Newcastle United as manager, following the departure of Sam Allardyce and the arrival of the club's new ownership and board. However, United only interviewed Harry Redknapp and Kevin Keegan for the position, with Keegan soon after being appointed with the job; Souness's interest has never been publicly acknowledged by the club.

Following the sacking of Blackburn Rovers manager Paul Ince on 16 December 2008, Souness was linked with a return to the club as manager. However, Sam Allardyce was appointed as the new manager on 17 December, after Souness said he had no contact from Blackburn about the position.

Having been linked with the Scotland national team in November 2009, Souness stated he has no desire to return to management at any level.

=== Bid for Wolverhampton Wanderers ===
In January 2007, it was reported by the Daily Mirror that Souness was heading a £20 million consortium to take over Football League Championship club Wolverhampton Wanderers. He attended a Wolves game as a VIP guest and made a formal offer for the club, asking to see the club's finances. The bid was rejected by the Wolves board, which felt it undervalued the club. Souness did not make a repeat offer for the club and it was later sold to another investor.

== Biographies ==
In 1985, Souness wrote an autobiography called No Half Measures. In 1999, he wrote another book chronicling his post-playing career up to and including his spell at Southampton, entitled Souness: The Management Years.

== Life outside football ==
=== Personal life ===
Souness' first wife was Danielle Wilson; they met in 1982 and married in 1984. He adopted her young daughter, and they had three more children together. They separated in 1989 and later divorced.

Souness has been married to Karen Souness, his second wife, since 1994. Together, the couple have a son and Souness has two stepchildren from Karen's previous relationship.

In 2010, Souness sold the family home in Colinton in Edinburgh for £3.5m to Fred Goodwin, and moved to a newly developed property in Sandbanks, Poole, Dorset.

During a discussion about climate change on Sky Sports Super Sunday in 2021, Souness announced that he had been following a vegan diet for the previous three years.

=== Political views ===
In 1982, Souness and teammate Sammy Lee made cameo appearances, as themselves, in an episode of the BBC's Liverpudlian drama series Boys from the Blackstuff. Written by Alan Bleasdale, the series offered a critique of Thatcherism – and in particular the large-scale unemployment then evident in urban Britain – apparently at odds with Souness's own Conservative politics.

In 2007, in the lead-up to elections to the Scottish Parliament, Souness was one of 15 prominent current and former footballers named in a newspaper advertisement urging "every patriotic Scot to help maintain Scotland's place in the United Kingdom which has served Scotland well."

Prior to the 2025 Hamilton, Larkhall and Stonehouse by-election to the Scottish Parliament, in which Reform UK was expected to contend for victory, Souness blasted Reform leader Nigel Farage as a "chancer" who "doesn't care about [Scots]," encouraging voters to choose the Labour candidate and eventual winner, Davy Russell.

=== Charitable work ===
Souness launched a fundraising campaign for DEBRA, a charity seeking a cure for epidermolysis bullosa, in May 2023. As part of the fundraising activities he announced plans to swim the English Channel. On 18 June 2023, he completed the swim, in a wetsuit, as part of a six-person relay team, raising £1m for the charity.

=== Reputation ===
Souness was described by The Daily Telegraph as "one of the most fearsome men in the game." However, his Liverpool team-mate Michael Robinson said of Souness in 2016: "I found him a very personal, cuddly chap who was actually quite vulnerable about being a human being with emotions. To this day, he still tries very hard not to be this lovely cuddly person, when really he is."

== Career statistics ==
=== Club ===
Appearances and goals by club, season and competition
Club	Season	League			National cup (Note: Includes FA Cup, Coppa Italia, Scottish Cup)		League cup (Note: Includes Football League Cup, Scottish League Cup)		Continental		Other		Total	
Club	Season	Division	Apps	Goals	Apps	Goals	Apps	Goals	Apps	Goals	Apps	Goals	Apps	Goals
Tottenham Hotspur	1971–72	First Division	0	0	0	0	0	0	1 (Note: Appearance in UEFA Cup)	0	–		1	0
Montreal Olympique	1972	NASL	10	2			–		–		–		10	2
Middlesbrough	1972–73	Second Division	9	0					–		–		9	0
Middlesbrough	1973–74	Second Division	35	7					–		–		35	7
Middlesbrough	1974–75	First Division	38	7					–		–		38	7
Middlesbrough	1975–76	First Division	35	3					–		–		35	3
Middlesbrough	1976–77	First Division	38	2					–		–		38	2
Middlesbrough	1977–78	First Division	19	3					–		–		19	3
Middlesbrough	Total		176	22	13	1	12	0	–		–		201	23
Liverpool	1977–78	First Division	15	2	0	0	0	0	3 (Note: Appearances in European Cup)	0	–		18	2
Liverpool	1978–79	First Division	41	8	7	1	1	0	2	0	2 (Note: Appearances in European Super Cup)	0	53	9
Liverpool	1979–80	First Division	41	1	8	1	7	0	2	0	1 (Note: Appearance in FA Charity Shield)	0	59	2
Liverpool	1980–81	First Division	37	6	1	0	8	1	8	6	1	0	55	13
Liverpool	1981–82	First Division	35	5	3	0	9	1	6	0	1 (Note: Appearance in Intercontinental Cup)	0	54	6
Liverpool	1982–83	First Division	41	9	3	0	8	2	6	0	1	0	59	11
Liverpool	1983–84	First Division	37	7	2	0	12	5	9	0	1	0	61	12
Liverpool	Total		247	38	24	2	46	9	35	6	7	0	354	55
Sampdoria	1984–85	Serie A	28	5	12	1	–		–		–		40	6
Sampdoria	1985–86	Serie A	28	3	6	2	–		4 (Note: Appearances in European Cup Winners' Cup)	0	–		38	5
Sampdoria	Total		56	8	18	3	–		4	0	–		78	11
Rangers	1986–87	Scottish Premier Division	25	1	1	0	3	2	3	0	–		32	3
Rangers	1987–88	Scottish Premier Division	18	2	3	0	3	0	6	0	–		30	2
Rangers	1988–89	Scottish Premier Division	6	0	1	0	3	0	0	0	–		10	0
Rangers	1989–90	Scottish Premier Division	1	0	0	0	0	0	0	0	–		1	0
Rangers	Total		50	3	5	0	9	2	9	0	–		73	5
Career total			537	73	60	6	67	11	49	6	7	0	706	96

=== International ===
Scotland
Year	Apps	Goals
1974	2	0
1975	1	0
1976	—	
1977	—	
1978	6	0
1979	6	0
1980	3	0
1981	4	0
1982	9	1
1983	8	1
1984	4	1
1985	7	0
1986	4	1
Total	54	4

Scores and results list Scotland's goal tally first.

#	Date	Venue	Opponent	Score	Result	Competition
1.	22 June 1982	Estadio La Rosaleda, Málaga	Soviet Union	2–2	2–2	1982 FIFA World Cup
2.	16 June 1983	Commonwealth Stadium, Edmonton	Canada	3–0	3–0	Friendly
3.	12 September 1984	Hampden Park, Glasgow	Yugoslavia	2–1	6–1	Friendly
4.	23 April 1986	Wembley Stadium, London	England	1–2	1–2	1986 Rous Cup

=== Manager ===
Team	Nat	From	To	Record				
Team	Nat	From	To	G	W	D	L	Win %
Rangers	SCO	1 April 1986	16 April 1991	260	165	50	45	63.46
Liverpool	ENG	16 April 1991	28 January 1994	157	65	47	45	41.40
Galatasaray	TUR	1 July 1995	1 July 1996	43	25	8	10	58.14
Southampton	ENG	3 July 1996	1 June 1997	48	14	15	19	29.17
Torino	ITA	5 July 1997	12 October 1997	6	2	1	3	33.33
Benfica	POR	2 November 1997	3 May 1999	71	41	15	15	57.75
Blackburn Rovers	ENG	14 March 2000	6 September 2004	212	86	61	65	40.57
Newcastle United	ENG	13 September 2004	2 February 2006	83	36	18	29	43.37
Total				880	434	217	229	49.32

== Honours ==
Souness was appointed Commander of the Order of the British Empire (CBE) in the 2024 Birthday Honours for services to association football and to charity.

=== Player ===
Tottenham Hotspur Youth

- FA Youth Cup: 1969–70

Middlesbrough

- Football League Second Division: 1973–74

Liverpool

- Football League First Division: 1978–79, 1979–80, 1981–82, 1982–83, 1983–84
- Football League Cup: 1980–81, 1981–82, 1982–83, 1983–84
- FA Charity Shield: 1979, 1980, 1982
- European Cup: 1977–78, 1980–81, 1983–84

Sampdoria

- Coppa Italia: 1984–85

Rangers

- Scottish Premier Division: 1986–87, 1988–89
- Scottish League Cup: 1986–87, 1987–88, 1988–89

Scotland

- Rous Cup: 1985

Individual

- Middlesbrough Player of the Year: 1973–74
- European Cup Golden Boot: 1980–81
- PFA Team of the Year: 1980–81 First Division, 1981–82 First Division, 1982–83 First Division, 1983–84 First Division
- PFA Team of the Century (1977–96): 2007

=== Manager ===
Rangers

- Scottish Premier Division: 1986–87, 1988–89, 1989–90
- Scottish League Cup: 1986–87, 1987–88, 1988–89, 1990–91

Liverpool

- FA Cup: 1991–92

Galatasaray

- Turkish Cup: 1995–96

Blackburn Rovers

- Football League Cup: 2001–02
- Football League First Division second-place promotion: 2000–01

Individual

- Premier League Manager of the Month: October 1996, April 1997

=== Inductions ===
Inducted into the Scotland national football team roll of honour in 1985, when he gained his 50th international cap. In 1998, Souness was included in the Football League 100 Legends list. A 2006 poll of 110,000 Liverpool supporters – 100 Players Who Shook The Kop, saw Souness placed the ninth most popular player in the club's history, and in 2026 he was ranked the club's sixth greatest ever player in another official Liverpool F.C. poll. Souness has been inducted into the English Football Hall of Fame (in 2007), the Scottish Football Hall of Fame (in 2004) and the Rangers F.C. Hall of Fame.

A summary of Souness's personal achievements are as follows in chronological order:

- Scotland national football team roll of honour
- Football League 100 Legends
- Liverpool 100 players who shook the Kop
- English Football Hall of Fame
- Scottish Football Hall of Fame
- Rangers Hall of Fame

== See also ==
- List of Scotland national football team captains

== Bibliography ==
- Graeme Souness & Mike Ellis (1999). Souness: The Management Years. Andre Deutsch. ISBN 0-233-99738-5.
- Graeme Souness & Bob Harris (1987). No Half Measures. Grafton Books. ISBN 0-586-07424-4.
