= Peter Storrie =

Football chief executive (born 1952)

Peter Storrie (born 7 November 1952) is a football chief executive. He was also a former director and chief executive officer of English team Portsmouth, and had formerly worked for West Ham United, Southend United and Notts County.

== Clubs involvement ==
=== West Ham United ===
A lifelong fan of West Ham United, Storrie joined the club as a non-executive director in 1990. He became the club's first paid Managing Director in 1991, and was instrumental in setting up a pioneering academy in Australia. Described as "avuncular and approachable" by a writer on one fan website, he managed to be popular even when his decisions weren't. With the introduction of a bond scheme in 1991, which required match goers to pay hundreds of pounds in return for a guaranteed seat at Upton Park, when fans protested on the pitch and refused to move, Storrie invited them up to the boardroom to discuss the issue. He was sacked from his position of Director of Football at the end of the 1998–99 season, when chairman Terry Brown decided to restructure the club.

=== Southend United ===
Storrie took the role of Chief Executive of Southend United in July 1999, achieving notoriety over his reputed £120,000 a season salary.

=== Notts County ===
After that, he joined Notts County and became Executive Deputy Chairman.

=== Portsmouth ===
His move from Notts County to Portsmouth was the source of some controversy. On the recommendation of manager Harry Redknapp — his former West Ham United colleague — he initially took up a role at Portsmouth on a job share basis in early 2002, helping to review the club's infrastructure and organisation. He eventually joined Portsmouth permanently in late February 2002 as Chief Executive, replacing Martin Murphy after his 12 months at the club in the process.

He remained Chief Executive Officer of Portsmouth despite the club's 2006 change in ownership from Milan Mandaric to Alexandre 'Sacha' Gaydamak but subsequently took on the role of Executive Chairman. In July 2009, Sulaiman Al Fahim, the UAE businessman assumed the role of Chairman and Peter Storrie reverted to Chief Executive Officer. In June 2007 he was invited to serve as a member on the FA Council, becoming one of eight representatives from the Premier League. Storrie said "It is good recognition for the club so I am delighted to be asked to serve as a member".

Storrie was arrested on 28 November 2007 — along with Harry Redknapp, Mandaric, agent Willie McKay and former Portsmouth player Amdy Faye — over allegations of corruption. In November 2011 Storrie and Milan Mandaric were cleared of tax avoidance charges relating to the transfer of Faye and of Eyal Berkovic.

Storrie presided over a mixed four-year period which resulted in Portsmouth FC entering administration in late February 2010. On 12 March 2010 he stepped down as Portsmouth's Chief Executive Officer while staying on as a consultant till the club exited administration. The week Portsmouth were in court over the HMRC's challenge of Portsmouth's CVA, Storrie was reported to have left the club.

=== Central Coast Mariners ===
In January 2015 it was announced that Storrie had been appointed by A-League franchise, Central Coast Mariners FC, as an associate director, and was subsequently appointed as Executive Vice-Chairman on 20 February 2015.

=== Later career ===
Following his time in Australia, Storrie was appointed by Joseph Oughourlian to advise on transfers and financial matters for Colombian club Millonarios and French club RC Lens.

In 2023, Storrie served as Charlton Athletic's chief executive during Thomas Sandgaard's final months at the club.
