= Amdy Faye =

Senegalese footballer (born 1977)

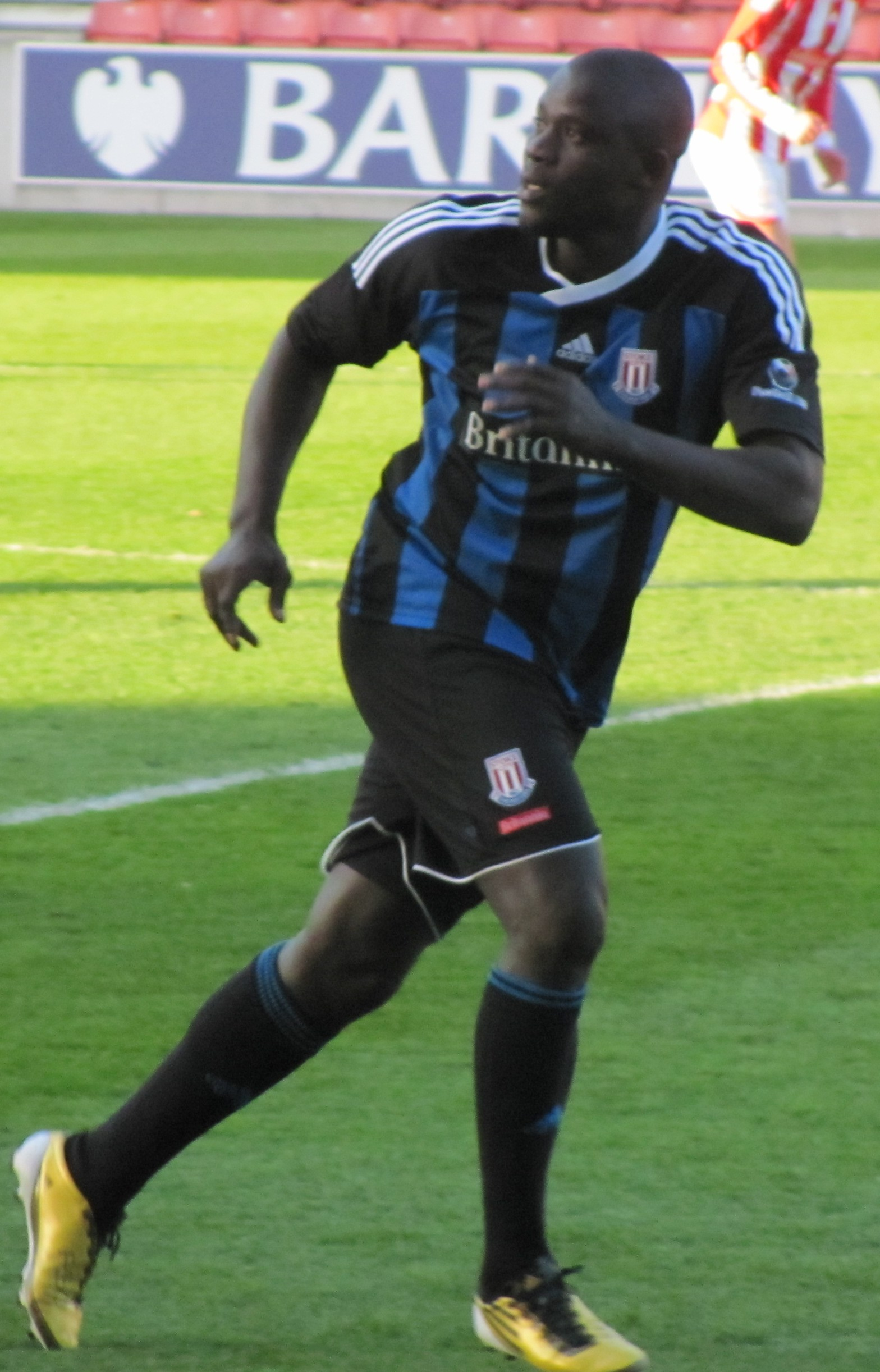
- Faye at the Britannia Stadium in a charity match for Stoke City in 2011.

Personal information
- Full name: Amdy Moustapha Faye
- Date of birth: 12 March 1977 (age 49)
- Place of birth: Dakar, Senegal
- Height: 6 ft 0 in (1.83 m)
- Positions: Centre midfielder; centre back

Senior career*
Years	Team	Apps	(Gls)
1994–1995	AS Monaco	0	(0)
1995–1998	ES Fréjus	71	(11)
1998–2003	Auxerre	79	(3)
2003–2005	Portsmouth	41	(0)
2005–2006	Newcastle United	31	(0)
2006–2008	Charlton Athletic	29	(1)
2007–2008	→ Rangers (loan)	4	(0)
2008–2010	Stoke City	21	(0)
2010–2011	Leeds United	8	(0)
Total		284	(15)

International career
2001–2006	Senegal	34	(0)
- * Club domestic league appearances and goals

Amdy Moustapha Faye (born 12 March 1977) is a Senegalese former professional footballer who played as a defensive midfielder and could also play as a centre back.

Faye began his career with Monégasque club AS Monaco, French clubs ES Fréjus and Auxerre before moving to Premier League side Portsmouth in August 2003 for a fee of £1.5 million. He spent a season and a half at Fratton Park before leaving for Newcastle United in January 2005 for £2 million. He then had spells with Charlton Athletic and Scottish side Rangers. He joined Stoke City in August 2008 and spent the 2008–09 season with the Potters. He ended his career with a short stay at Leeds United.

During his tenure at English football, his first name was sometimes referred as Amady because of a misspelling in his passport.

== Club career ==
=== Early career ===
Faye began his career at AS Monaco FC, playing for their youth team between 1996 and 1997. He then played for Championnat National side ES Frejus.

=== Auxerre ===
Faye signed for AJ Auxerre of Ligue 1 in 1998. He failed to make the first team in his first season he then made three appearances in the 1999–2000 season. Faye then began to break into the first team for the 2000–01 season when he made 22 appearances scoring once in his third season at the club.

His first appearances of the 2001–02 season came in their 5–0 away win over Stade Rennais on the opening day of the season when he came on as a 47th-minute substitute. He made 23 appearances in all competitions and scored once in the cup and help Auxerre top a third-place finish in Ligue 1 qualifying then for the UEFA Champions League.

His first game of the 2002–03 season came in Auxerre 1–0 away defeat to PSG on the opening day of the season. His first goal came in Auxerre 2–1 away defeat to Lens in November 2002, he then scored his second goal in their Troyes on 11 January 2003 in their 1–0 home victory. He played 46 games in all competitions in 2002–03 including 10 in European competitions both the Champions League and UEFA Cup, before transferring to Portsmouth for £1.5 million in August 2003. In his final season at Auxerre he also helped them win the 2002–03 Coupe de France, playing in the final as they defeated Paris Saint-Germain.

=== Portsmouth ===
He made his debut for Portsmouth in a 2–1 home win over Aston Villa. However, a knee injury picked up at the end of October threatened to rule him out for five months of the 2003–04 season. He returned in December, but after just three games suffered a relapse and was out until the end of January. Due to the injury, Faye was not selected by Senegal for the 2004 African Nations Cup but he made 31 appearances for Pompey in his debut campaign.

=== Newcastle United ===
Faye signed for Premier League side Newcastle United in January 2005 for a fee of around £2million along with Jean-Alain Boumsong and Celestine Babayaro as part of manager Graeme Souness's first transfer deals at the club. He made his debut in Newcastle's 3–1 FA Cup win over Coventry City on 29 January 2005. His first league game came in their 1–1 draw with Manchester City away 2 February. He made his first appearances in the UEFA Cup for Newcastle in their round of 32 win away at Dutch side SC Heerenveen. He made his first appearance of the 2005–06 season in Newcastle's 2–0 win over ZTS Dubnica in the 2005 UEFA Intertoto Cup. His first league game came in their 2–0 loss to Arsenal. In the 2005–06 season he was used on the right wing in some cases when Newcastle suffered injuries in the midfield area, often as part of a makeshift midfield involving striker Shola Ameobi on the left wing and veteran Lee Clark drafted in to cover the midfield area, one example is the 3–0 win over Blackburn Rovers. He failed to impress however, and was offloaded in the summer with the arrival of new midfielder Damien Duff and James Milner returning from his loan at Aston Villa.

=== Charlton Athletic ===
On 8 August 2006, after one and a half seasons in the Northeast, he completed a move to Charlton Athletic. He scored his first goal since he moved to English football in 2003, against his former club Portsmouth on 20 January 2007. His debut season with Charlton, however, was unsuccessful as the club was relegated at the end of the season.

==== Rangers (loan) ====
In August 2007, after playing the first game of the season for Charlton in the Championship, Faye joined Scottish Premier League side Rangers on a season-long loan, but failed to break into the side, making only six appearances. In January 2008, he trained with Premier League side Blackburn Rovers, but was prevented from making a move to the club because of FIFA rules which bar players from playing for three teams in one season. He returned to Charlton in the 2008 summer on 15 August, before signing for Stoke.

=== Stoke City ===
He signed for Stoke City. Coincidentally, on the same day another Senegalese international and former Newcastle United player named Faye also signed for Stoke City, central defender Abdoulaye Faye.

Faye made his Stoke City debut in a 3–2 in over Aston Villa he was substituted on the 72nd minute by fellow Senegal player Salif Diao. In his second game against Middlesbrough, Faye carelessly got himself sent off after diving into a two-footed tackle on Mohamed Shawky. Following this, Faye failed to establish himself in the team mainly being used as a substitute. Faye played in 21 matches for Stoke with the last being a 1–0 win over Middlesbrough.

Faye played in Stoke's 1–0 League Cup victory over Leyton Orient this being his only appearance in the 2009–10 season. He was released by Stoke at the end of the season.

"He's unfortunately had a lot of injuries this past year," said Pulis, "but he played his part for us in our first season in the Premier. "He's one who won't be remembered by the fans, but he played some smashing games for us. He also got his head down and worked hard behind the scenes to try and get himself fit."

— Stoke manager Tony Pulis on releasing Amdy Faye.

=== Leeds United ===
In September 2010, Faye came to Leeds United on trial, and after training with the club for several days he played a reserve game for Leeds against Grimsby Town to try prove his fitness levels to earn a contract at the club. Faye signed a permanent deal for Leeds on 9 September until January 2011, with the option of extending it further. 14 September to help gain match fitness Faye played 90 minutes in Leeds' 3–1 behind closed doors friendly win against Middlesbrough.

Faye made his debut for Leeds after coming into the starting 11 against Ipswich Town. Faye started the following game and put in an impressive performance in Leeds' win against Middlesbrough, however he picked up an injury late on in the second half and had to be substituted. But his injury wasn't as serious as first thought and he returned to the starting line-up the following game against Leicester City. Faye struggled to get back into the team due to the form of Bradley Johnson. On 1 January 2011, manager Simon Grayson revealed that Faye might get a new contract despite not playing many games. However, on 12 January, Faye's six-month contract was not renewed and he left the club.

== International career ==
Faye played 34 times for Senegal since 2001. He was part of the Senegal squad at both the African Nations Cup and the World Cup in 2002. Faye was one of the Senegal players who missed a penalty during the shootout at the end of the 2002 African Cup of Nations final as they lost to Cameroon.

He was also in the Senegal team that reached the quarter-finals of the 2002 FIFA World Cup in Japan. He played 2 games in the tournament in their 3–3 draw with Uruguay where he came on as a 76th-minute substitute, and also in their 2–1 extra time win over Sweden in the round of 16.

He was also involved in Senegal's 2006 FIFA World Cup qualification and was also part of the Senegal squad at the 2006 Africa Cup of Nations.

== Corruption allegations ==
Faye was arrested by City of London Police on 28 November 2007 along with Harry Redknapp, Milan Mandarić, Peter Storrie and Willie McKay over allegations of corruption.

His transfer from Portsmouth to Newcastle United in January 2005 was one of those about which the Stevens inquiry report in June 2007 expressed concerns:

There remains inconsistencies in evidence provided by Graeme Souness – a former manager of the club – and Kenneth Shepherd – apparently acting in an undefined role but not as a club official – as to their respective roles in transfer negotiations. The inquiry is still awaiting clarification from agent Willie McKay.

However, the Stevens enquiry later issued two clarifications. It said of Souness: "We wish to make it clear that inconsistencies did not exist within the evidence given by Graeme Souness to Quest concerning his role in transfers covered by the Inquiry during his time as manager of Newcastle United FC and neither the Premier League nor do Quest have any concerns in this regard". Then, on 7 November 2007, Quest issued the following statement about McKay: "Further to the key findings from the final Quest report published on 15 June 2007 by the Premier League, Quest would like to emphasise that, in that report, it was clear that no evidence of irregular payments was found in the transfers in the inquiry period which involved the agent Willie McKay. Quest would also like to thank Mr McKay for his cooperation with the inquiry."

== Career statistics ==
=== Club ===
Appearances and goals by club, season and competition
Club	Season	League			FA Cup		League Cup		Europe		Total	
Club	Season	Division	Apps	Goals	Apps	Goals	Apps	Goals	Apps	Goals	Apps	Goals
AS Monaco	1995–96	French Division 1	0	0	0	0	0	0	0	0	0	0
ES Fréjus	1996–97	Championnat National	22	2	0	0	0	0	0	0	22	2
ES Fréjus	1997–98	Championnat National	27	4	0	0	0	0	0	0	27	4
ES Fréjus	1998–99	Championnat National	22	5	0	0	0	0	0	0	22	5
ES Fréjus	Total		71	11	0	0	0	0	0	0	71	11
AJ Auxerre	1998–99	French Division 1	0	0	0	0	0	0	0	0	0	0
AJ Auxerre	1999–2000	French Division 1	3	0	0	0	0	0	0	0	3	0
AJ Auxerre	2000–01	French Division 1	22	1	1	0	0	0	1	0	24	1
AJ Auxerre	2001–02	French Division 1	20	0	2	1	1	0	0	0	23	1
AJ Auxerre	2002–03	Ligue 1	34	2	0	0	0	0	12	0	46	2
AJ Auxerre	Total		79	3	3	1	1	0	13	0	96	4
Portsmouth	2003–04	Premier League	21	0	3	0	1	0	0	0	25	0
Portsmouth	2004–05	Premier League	20	0	0	0	1	0	0	0	21	0
Portsmouth	Total		41	0	3	0	2	0	0	0	46	0
Newcastle United	2004–05	Premier League	9	0	3	0	0	0	8	0	20	0
Newcastle United	2005–06	Premier League	22	0	0	0	2	0	4	0	28	0
Newcastle United	Total		31	0	3	0	2	0	12	0	48	0
Charlton Athletic	2006–07	Premier League	28	1	1	0	3	0	0	0	32	1
Charlton Athletic	2007–08	Championship	1	0	0	0	1	0	0	0	2	0
Charlton Athletic	Total		29	1	1	0	4	0	0	0	34	1
Rangers (loan)	2007–08	Scottish Premier League	4	0	0	0	1	0	1	0	6	0
Stoke City	2008–09	Premier League	21	0	0	0	1	0	0	0	22	0
Stoke City	2009–10	Premier League	0	0	0	0	1	0	0	0	1	0
Stoke City	Total		21	0	0	0	2	0	0	0	23	0
Leeds United	2010–11	Championship	8	0	0	0	0	0	0	0	8	0
Career total			284	15	10	1	12	0	26	0	332	16

=== International ===
National team	Year	Apps	Goals
Senegal	2001	2	0
Senegal	2002	9	0
Senegal	2003	7	0
Senegal	2004	4	0
Senegal	2005	6	0
Senegal	2006	6	0
Total		34	0
