= Nahum Galmor =

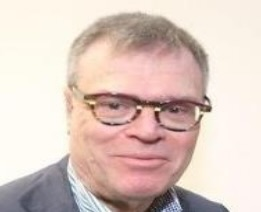
- Born: August 17, 1948 (age 78); Bucharest, Romania
- Occupation: Businessman
- Known for: Phosphate Industry

Nahum Galmor (born August 17, 1948) is an Italian-Israeli industrialist residing in Switzerland. He has been the owner and chairman of the board of the Dutch company Thermphos since 2003.

== Career ==
Nahum Galmor studied economics in the USA and holds a Master of Business Administration. He worked as a managing director for Transphos, an affiliate of Israel Chemicals, the leading chemical concern in Israel and as a director for Indian Ocean Fertilizer, a South African company. At the outset of his career he served as a Vice Consul at the Israel General Consulate in New York.

In 2002 Galmor took over the Kazakh company Kazphosphate LLC, the largest phosphate producer of the former Soviet Union.

In 2003 with a group of investors Galmor took over Thermphos, which was a former affiliate of the German chemicals company Hoechst AG.

Under the new ownership Thermphos has played a leading role in consolidating the international phosphorus and derivatives sector. Galmor, as the chairman of the board, strategically expanded Thermphos with several acquisitions. He brought phosphate supplier Kazphosphate closer together with phosphate manufacturer Thermphos. This proved to be economically very beneficial for both companies:

Kazphosphate increased sales from $26 million (2000) to $183 million (2006). Thermphos tripled the revenues from €237 (1999) to €714 million (2008) and made a profit (after taxes) of €124 million (1999: € 4 million).

In 2007 Galmor sold Kazphosphate LLC to Nurlan Bizakov for an estimated sum of $120 million.

== Controversy ==
=== Indictment in Israel ===
In October 2009 Galmor was indicted in Israel for "fraudulently obtaining goods or benefits". He is accused to have conspired with the controversial Russian-Israeli businessman Arcadi Gaydamak to deceive the shareholders of Thermphos.

The prosecutor in Tel Aviv alleges that Galmor acted as a straw man for Gaydamak during the negotiations and that he presented $50 million of Gaydamak's money as belonging to him. The prosecutor claims that Gaydamak had concealed his identity because he knew the shareholders of Thermphos would not sell the firm to someone with his reputation.

Galmor denies the allegations, saying he has never concealed the fact to the shareholders that Gaydamak initially had indeed been part of the group of investors. When it became clear to him that a financial backing of Gaydamak would form a complication, he sought and found an alternative financing structure.

Some media reports criticized the Israeli authorities for their investigation. According to the Dutch daily newspaper NRC Handelsblad the Israeli prosecutor does not have any proof that the money for the purchase of Thermphos was Gaydamak's.

The Israeli business publication The Marker described the investigation against Gaydamak as politically motivated and wrote that several important witnesses and former shareholders of Thermphos have not been questioned by the prosecutor.

=== Chemical Exports to Iran ===
The Dutch daily De Telegraaf reported that an Israeli intelligence service tried to prevent the sale of Thermphos to Galmor because of fears that Thermphos might be abused for trading chemical products with Iran.

The Dutch Minister of Justice replied to parliamentary questions regarding these allegations on January 27, 2010. He stated that a preliminary investigation produced absolutely no evidence for any criminal offences and that neither Thermphos nor its managers were involved in delivering certain chemicals to Iran. In February 2012, the prosecutor dropped his charges of money laundering to focus on lesser offences.
