= Thermphos International =

Thermphos International B.V.
- Type: Besloten Vennootschap
- Industry: Chemical
- Founded: Vlissingen, Netherlands
- Fate: Bankrupt
- Headquarters: Vlissingen, Netherlands
- Key people: Rob de Ruiter (Managing director)
- Products: Phosphorus Compounds
- Number of employees: about 450 (end 2012)
- Website: http://www.thermphos.com/

The Thermphos International B.V. was a venture of the chemical industry, which produced phosphorus and inorganic phosphorus compounds. In 2005, it earned about 550 Million Euros and employed about 1200 people. It was Europe's only producer of elemental phosphorus. The company was also involved in recycling phosphorus. It used to be a former affiliate of the German chemicals company Hoechst AG and was taken over in 2003 by a group of private investors, led by the Italian-Israeli businessman Nahum Galmor.

== Sites ==
The headquarters of the venture was in Vlissingen (in the Netherlands), with supporting production centres in Europe, Asia, and South America.

In North America, the company operates a sales center in Anniston, Alabama and Mattawan, Canada.

Worldwide, the company has 16 daughter corporations:

- Thermphos International BV, Netherlands
- Thermphos Deutschland GmbH, Germany
- Thermphos France S.A.R.L., France
- Thermphos UK Ltd., Great Britain
- Thermphos Food Additive Co. Ltd., China
- Sudamfos S.A., Argentina
- Omnisal GmbH, Germany
- Thermphos Trading GmbH, Switzerland
- Thermphos Dequest AG, Switzerland
- Thermphos Dequest UK Ltd., Great Britain
- Thermphos België BVBA, Belgium
- Thermphos Investments Singapore Pte. Ltd, Singapore
- Thermphos Japan Ltd., Japan
- Thermphos USA Corp., United States
- Sudamfos Comercio de Produtos Quimicos do Brasil Ltda., Brazil
- Industrial Park Vlissingen, Netherlands

== Products ==
Thermphos products center around phosphorus and phosphates. This ranges from elemental phosphorus to base chemicals of phosphate chemistry, such as phosphoric Acid and polyphosphoric acid, phosphorus trichloride, phosphorus oxychloride, phosphorus pentachloride, phosphorus pentoxide, phosphorus pentasulfide, aluminium phosphate, calcium phosphate, ammonium phosphate, potassium phosphate, and sodium phosphate, as well as other additives for plastics and ceramics as well as food industries. Phosphorus is one of the three main nutrients present in fertilizer.

== Environmental issues ==
In September 2010, the Public Health authorities of The Netherlands (VROM) issued an ultimatum on the Thermphos Industrial Park Vlissingen because of enduring severe environmental and safety problems related to emission of and exposure to cadmium and dioxins. If these problems were not solved quickly, VROM said, the factory must be closed.

== Bankruptcy ==
On November 21, 2012, the district court of Breda declared the company bankrupt.
