= Aggie Moffat =

St Johnstone tea lady

- Born: 20 April 1946; Ballingry, Fife, Scotland
- Died: 14 April 2017 (aged 70); Perth, Scotland

Agnes Moffat (20 April 1946 – 14 April 2017) was a Scottish woman became renowned for her near thirty-year service to Scottish football club St Johnstone as its tea lady, notably a feud she had with Rangers manager Graeme Souness.

== Early life ==
Moffat was born in Ballingry, Fife, on April 20, 1946.

== Career at St Johnstone ==
Moffat began working for St Johnstone, then based at Muirton Park, in 1980. Her duties included managing laundry, cleaning dressing rooms and preparing meals for players and staff. "[She] was like a gran to all the players at St Johnstone," wrote former Saints striker Kevin Twaddle in his autobiography. "She looked after us all and did everything at the club, from the strips to getting everything sorted behind the scenes."

=== Graham Souness incident ===
Moffat gained public attention in 1991 for a confrontation with Rangers manager Graeme Souness following a 1–1 draw at Muirton Park. During the incident, Souness allegedly threw a jug belonging to Moffat, prompting a direct exchange between the two in front of club executives. The altercation, referred to as "The Storm in a Teacup," became part of Scottish football folklore. In later interviews, including one published in The Scotsman in 2001, Moffat expressed strong opinions about the manager. Souness himself acknowledged that the encounter contributed to his decision to leave Scottish football.

In 2000, Moffat was approached to appear in the football drama A Shot at Glory starring Robert Duvall and Ally McCoist. She declined the opportunity, suggesting that Elizabeth Hurley could take the role instead.

== Personal life and death ==
Moffat was married to Bob.

Moffat retired in 2007. She died in Perth on 14 April 2017, aged 70. Her death was met with tributes from players, staff and fans.
