= Milan Mandarić =

Serbian-American businessman (1938–2025)

- Милан Мандарић
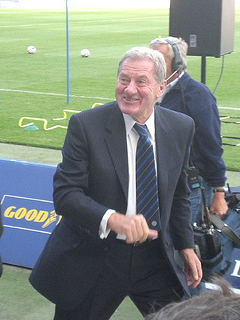
- Mandarić at the Walkers Stadium in 2007
- Born: 5 September 1938; Gospić, Yugoslavia
- Died: 4 October 2025 (aged 87); Belgrade, Serbia
- Citizenship: American
- Occupation: Vice president

Milan Mandarić (Serbian Cyrillic: Милан Мандарић; 5 September 1938 – 4 October 2025) was a Serbian-American businessman who owned a string of businesses and association football clubs, including Portsmouth, Leicester City and Sheffield Wednesday. He was most recently the vice-president of Serbian Superliga team Vojvodina.

== Early life ==
He was born near Gospić, Yugoslavia (today Croatia), and grew up in Novi Sad.

== Business activities ==
=== Yugoslavia and Serbia ===
Mandarić took control of his father's machine shop aged 21, and by the age of 26 had turned it into one of the largest businesses in the country.

=== United States ===
In 1969, worried by the Yugoslav government's view of his business, Mandarić left Yugoslavia and settled in the United States. He had to leave most of his fortune behind, and got a job for an American computer component manufacturer in California. When two of the senior managers left to start their own firm, Mandarić was invited to be their third partner. The firm was successful, but disagreements over manufacturing processes led to Mandarić leaving to form his own company, Lika Corporation, in 1971. In 1976, he became a naturalized citizen of the U.S. By 1976, Lika Corp. was the largest manufacturer of computer components in the U.S., and Mandarić was pioneering the boom that led to the creation of California's Silicon Valley.

On 23 December 2009, Mandarić was charged with two counts of tax evasion by the Crown Prosecution Service, however he was found not guilty on 8 February 2012.

== Football ==
=== United States ===
Around the same time he had begun using his money to invest in football, Mandarić's passion since childhood (as a young man he had played for Novi Sad). He set up firstly semi-professional teams F.C. Lika, San Jose Lobos, before starting the San Jose Earthquakes which played in the United States' North American Soccer League. In 1978, he purchased a NASL franchise called the Connecticut Bicentennials and moved them to Oakland, California, to play as the Stompers. After one year in the East Bay, the team was moved to Edmonton, Alberta, to become the Drillers.

=== Europe ===
Sceptical about the future of the sport in the U.S., Mandarić looked to European football, initially taking a stake in Belgian team Standard Liège before taking outright ownership of Belgian club R. Charleroi S.C., then French side OGC Nice. Under his ownership the latter club won the 1996–97 Coupe de France but they were also relegated from the French top division.

=== Portsmouth ===
In 1998, Mandarić sold Nice and took over English club Portsmouth in May 1999, to whom he had been introduced by ex-player Preki.

After struggling for a number of years in the second tier of English football (now the EFL Championship), Portsmouth won promotion as champions to the Premier League, arguably the richest football division in the world. This was due in large part to Mandarić's appointment of the experienced manager Harry Redknapp. Mandarić appointed Velimir Zajec as executive director, a move which caused tension between Redknapp and Mandarić. Shortly afterwards, Redknapp resigned from Portsmouth.

In January 2006, Mandarić sold a 50% stake in the club to French-Israeli businessman Alexandre Gaydamak. After the club's survival that season, Mandarić sold his remaining share of Portsmouth to Gaydamak, but stayed on as a figurehead in his role as non-executive chairman.

Mandarić resigned as chairman of Portsmouth on 21 September 2006. Since then, Portsmouth appeared to prosper, with successive top-ten Premier League finishes and an FA Cup win in 2008. The club, however, was relegated in 2010.

Portsmouth City Council conferred the Freedom of the City of Portsmouth on Mandarić in 2003.

=== Leicester City ===
On 24 February 2006, Mandarić made a bid for East Midlands club Leicester City, believed to be in the region of £25 million. He had wanted to remain outside of football for a longer period, however he "had to accelerate takeover plans" because of bids for the club by at least two other parties. On 18 November 2006, Leicester City accepted his approach to take over the club at an extraordinary general meeting.

Despite setting an initial takeover deadline of 15 December, negotiations stalled, reportedly after hidden debts in the club's accounts surfaced during the due diligence period. Both parties, however, dismissed reports that the takeover bid was in danger of collapse, stating that it had merely been delayed. Indeed, on 2 January the Leicester Mercury reported that the deal was in fact close to completion after Mandarić's revised terms were accepted by the club's board. On 15 January, the paper reported that an official announcement confirming the takeover "will probably be on Thursday".

On 25 January 2007, Mandarić put his bid for Leicester on temporary hold after news of his mother's illness back in Serbia. There were wild rumours that suggested he was on the verge of pulling out and, indeed, the delay guaranteed that manager Rob Kelly would not enjoy the benefit of a cash injection before the season's transfer window closed on 31 January. Mandarić, however, returned from Serbia to complete the deal the following week.

On 13 February 2007, Mandarić was officially unveiled as owner of Leicester City. However, that the club were still a public limited company (PLC) meant he did not acquire the title of chairman for a further 23 days. In April 2007, he sacked manager Kelly and replaced him with Nigel Worthington as caretaker manager for the last five games of the season. At the end of the season, Martin Allen was named the club's new permanent manager but Allen left after only three months in charge in August as a result of deteriorating relations with Mandarić. Gary Megson was then appointed in September, becoming the third manager since Mandarić took over the club. Megson left after only six weeks in charge to take control of Premier League team Bolton Wanderers. Ian Holloway was Mandarić's fourth permanent manager, appointed in November 2007. Leicester, however, was relegated to League One at the end of the season for the first time in the club's history; many observers attributed this to the large turnover in managers since Mandarić took control of the club.

Mandarić was arrested on 28 November 2007 over allegations of corruption in football, along with Harry Redknapp, Peter Storrie, Willie McKay and Amdy Faye. but was later released without charge.

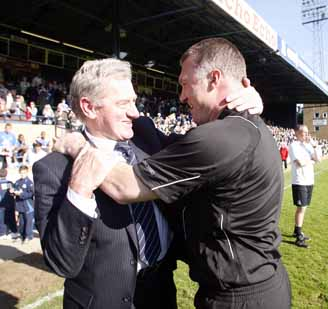
Nigel Pearson and Mandarić after winning the League One title with Leicester City.

After tumultuous times, however, things started to look up for Mandarić as Leicester were crowned champions of League One on 18 April 2009 under the stewardship of Nigel Pearson. The Foxes came close to achieving a second successive promotion the following season (something not achieved by any club at this level for a decade) as they finished fifth in the Championship but lost to Cardiff City in the playoff semi-finals.

During the close season, it was reported that Mandarić had agreed to sell Leicester City to a consortium of Thai businessmen, but these reports were swiftly denied by club officials. Just weeks later, however, he sold the club for a reported £40 million to Vichai Raksriaksorn and his son Aiyawatt. It later emerged that Mandarić was a shareholder in the consortium and he was re-appointed chairman.

=== Sheffield Wednesday ===
On 29 November 2010, Mandarić agreed to purchase Sheffield Wednesday. The purchase was completed after an extraordinary general meeting of Sheffield Wednesday shareholders on 14 December 2010, during which 99.7% of shareholders voted to sell the company to Mandarić's UK Football Investments for £1. Mandarić had agreed to settle the club's outstanding debts as part of the largely confidential deal. He negotiated settlements with a number of the club's creditors, including an agreement to pay the Co-operative Bank £7 million of the £23 million owed to them, and a deal to pay £1.5 million of the £2.4 million owed to five of the club's directors. Mandarić also stepped down as chairman of Leicester City, due to Football League rules preventing him from being the chairman of two different clubs. During his time as owner Wednesday secured promotion from League One to the Championship in 2012. In 2014 Mandarić agreed to sell the club to Azerbaijani businessman Hafiz Mammadov, however this fell through, and in January 2015 Mandarić struck a deal to sell the club to Thai businessman Dejphon Chansiri for £37.5 million, a sum which included money to clear the club's debts.

== Personal life ==
Mandarić died on 4 October 2025, at the age of 87.
