= Willie McKay =

Scottish football agent, based in Monaco (born 1996)

Willie McKay is a Scottish football agent, based in Monaco. He was the agent of many top-level footballers, mainly based in England and France, specifically the Premier League. His clients include James McFadden, Joey Barton, Henri Camara, Scott McDonald, Jean-Joël Perrier-Doumbé, Charles N'Zogbia, Tyrone Mears, Amdy Faye, Ross McCormack, and Pascal Chimbonda. He was Scott Brown's agent and his twin sons' agent, Jack and Paul McKay. His elder son Mark McKay is a registered football agent.

== Investigation by Quest ==
McKay was one of the agents investigated by the Quest team, led by Lord Stevens, which looked into allegations of "bungs" and fraud in transfers. The Daily Express claimed in December 2006 that the £8.5 million transfer of Jean-Alain Boumsong from Rangers F.C. to Newcastle United was one of the deals being examined by Quest. However Quest said of Graeme Souness, who was manager of Newcastle at the time of the Boumsong transfer, "We wish to make it clear that inconsistencies did not exist within the evidence given by Graeme Souness to Quest concerning his role in transfers covered by the Inquiry during his time as manager of Newcastle United FC and neither the Premier League nor do Quest have any concerns in this regard". In the final report of the Stevens inquiry he was criticised for his failure to co-operate with the inquiry. However, Quest later issued the following statement: "Further to the key findings from the final Quest report published on 15 June 2007 by the Premier League, Quest would like to emphasise that, in that report, it was clear that no evidence of irregular payments was found in the transfers in the inquiry period which involved the agent Willie McKay. Quest would also like to thank Mr McKay for his cooperation with the inquiry". On 1 February 2008 McKay won substantial libel damages against the Daily Express over false claims about his transfer dealings.

== November 2007 arrests ==
On 28 November 2007, it was reported by BBC News that McKay – together with Portsmouth manager Harry Redknapp and Managing Director Peter Storrie, former Portsmouth and then acting Leicester chairman Milan Mandaric, and former Portsmouth footballer Amdy Faye, on loan at Rangers – had been arrested by City of London Police in relation to the ongoing inquiries into allegations of corruption in football. McKay was among several individuals questioned during a City of London Police investigation into alleged football corruption. He was never charged, and police bail was dropped after two years.

== Doncaster Rovers experiment ==
In Doncaster Rovers' 2011–12 season they struggled for form, failing to win any of their first seven matches. Then manager, Sean O'Driscoll, was sacked, with Dean Saunders being brought in to replace him.

With the help of McKay, Doncaster Rovers brought in several "big–name" players in on loans and short-term contracts to try and rescue the club's Championship status, including El Hadji Diouf, Pascal Chimbonda, Herita Ilunga, Carl Ikeme, Frédéric Piquionne, and Habib Beye. Other players linked with the club included Robert Pires and the ex-Real Madrid midfielder Mahamadou Diarra. In the end, Doncaster were relegated to League One with three games still to play after a highly controversial match against Portsmouth. The club's relegation led to criticism from some supporters regarding McKay's recruitment strategy, though other factors were also cited as contributing to the team's performance. At the end of the 2011–12 season, chairman John Ryan deemed the McKay "experiment" over as it "didn't work" and "wouldn't work in the third tier" anyway.

== Emiliano Sala ==
Willie McKay and his son were involved in the events surrounding the transfer and death of Emiliano Sala.
