= Alexandre Gaydamak =

French and Israeli businessman

Alexandre "Sacha" Gaydamak
- אלכסנדר "סשה" גאידמק
- Born: May 1976 (age 49); France
- Occupation: Businessman
- Known for: Former owner of Portsmouth F.C.
- Parent: Arcadi Gaydamak (father)

Alexandre "Sacha" Gaydamak (Hebrew: אלכסנדר "סשה" גאידמק; born May 1976 in France) is a French and Israeli businessman. A member of the wealthy Gaydamak family, he is the only son of Arcadi Gaydamak.

In January 2006 he announced that he was following his father into association football club ownership by becoming co-owner of English Premier League club Portsmouth F.C. with Milan Mandarić.

His father was the owner of Israeli side Beitar Jerusalem. In July 2006 Alexandre Gaydamak became the sole owner of Portsmouth, although Mandarić remained at the club as non-executive chairman until later that year. Gaydamak owns a Luxembourg-based company, Belvia SARL and a British Virgin Islands company, Devondale Investments, which owned Portsmouth F.C.

On 21 July 2009, Gaydamak agreed to sell Portsmouth F.C. to Sulaiman Al Fahim in principle, and therefore stepped down from the board. He remained the owner of the club until the details of the sale had been finalised on 8 June 2009.

Gaydamak has been alleged to have asset stripped Portsmouth F.C. before this sale and yet still retains a claim, said to be £32,000,000, against the club as a creditor despite the huge debts at the club. Investigations into these allegations are ongoing.

On 22 October 2010, Gaydamak's business acumen was called into question after it was reported that he was demanding a payment of an alleged £2.5 million from his former club Portsmouth. It seems that he was unsure that his unpaid debt would be repaid. The case was made more embarrassing after Portsmouth F.C. had received confirmation several times from Gaydamak himself that the terms were agreed and that he was a secured creditor meaning that not only would be paid in full, but he would also be paid before many unsecured creditors who are set to only receive 20% of any debt.
